= 2011 Division 3 (Swedish football) =

Swedish League Division 3
- Season: 2011
- Champions: Assi IF; Tegs SK; Selånger FK; Karlbergs BK; Karlslunds IF HFK; Eskilstuna Södra FF; IF Hagapojkarna; IFK Uddevalla; Sävedalens IF; Oskarshamns AIK; Eskilsminne IF; Torns IF
- Promoted: 12 teams above and Robertsfors IK
- Relegated: 45 teams

Statistics of Swedish football Division 3 for the 2011 season.

== League standings ==
=== Norra Norrland 2011 ===
Pos	Team	Pld	W	D	L	GF	GA	GD	Pts	Promotion or relegation
1	Assi IF	22	16	3	3	62	21	+41	51	Promoted
2	Kiruna FF	22	14	6	2	51	16	+35	48	Promotion Playoffs
3	Alviks IK	22	14	4	4	42	22	+20	46	
4	Notvikens IK	22	11	2	9	44	36	+8	35	
5	Luleå SK	22	11	1	10	44	41	+3	34	
6	Övertorneå SK	22	10	3	9	33	32	+1	33	
7	Gällivare Malmbergets FF	22	7	6	9	35	45	−10	27	
8	Betsele IF	22	8	2	12	38	47	−9	26	
9	IFK Kalix	22	7	4	11	26	41	−15	25	Relegation Playoffs – Relegated
10	Malå IF	22	4	5	13	27	47	−20	17	Relegated
11	Bergnäsets AIK	22	5	2	15	30	62	−32	17	Relegated
12	Storfors AIK	22	3	6	13	20	42	−22	15	Relegated

=== Mellersta Norrland 2011 ===
Pos	Team	Pld	W	D	L	GF	GA	GD	Pts	Promotion or relegation
1	Tegs SK	22	14	5	3	69	25	+44	47	Promoted
2	Robertsfors IK	22	13	8	1	52	26	+26	47	Promotion Playoffs – Promoted
3	Friska Viljor FC	22	11	4	7	67	49	+18	37	
4	IFK Umeå	22	10	4	8	40	39	+1	34	
5	IFK Sundsvall	22	9	5	8	50	50	0	32	
6	Salsåker-Ullångers IF	22	9	4	9	42	44	−2	31	
7	Kubikenborgs IF	22	10	1	11	47	53	−6	31	
8	Alsens IF	22	7	8	7	44	34	+10	29	
9	Frösö IF	22	7	6	9	45	55	−10	27	Relegation Playoffs – Relegated
10	IFK Östersund	22	5	6	11	31	47	−16	21	Relegated
11	Stuguns BK	22	5	5	12	33	61	−28	20	Relegated
12	Sandviks IK	22	2	4	16	28	65	−37	10	Relegated

=== Södra Norrland 2011 ===
Pos	Team	Pld	W	D	L	GF	GA	GD	Pts	Promotion or relegation
1	Selånger FK	22	17	2	3	74	26	+48	53	Promoted
2	IK Huge	22	13	2	7	49	40	+9	41	Promotion Playoffs
3	Hille IF	22	12	4	6	46	31	+15	40	
4	Heby AIF	22	12	2	8	45	31	+14	38	
5	Rengsjö SK	22	9	3	10	40	37	+3	30	
6	Edsbyns IF FF	22	9	3	10	35	43	−8	30	
7	Sjötulls BK	22	9	2	11	45	53	−8	29	
8	Avesta AIK	22	8	4	10	41	46	−5	28	
9	Sund IF	22	8	4	10	41	51	−10	28	Relegation Playoffs – Relegated
10	Trönö IK	22	6	6	10	33	52	−19	24	Relegated
11	Söderhamns FF	22	6	2	14	32	47	−15	20	Relegated
12	Brynäs IF FK	22	5	2	15	28	52	−24	17	Relegated

=== Norra Svealand 2011 ===
Pos	Team	Pld	W	D	L	GF	GA	GD	Pts	Promotion or relegation
1	Karlbergs BK	22	17	3	2	66	22	+44	54	Promoted
2	Bele Barkarby FF	22	14	4	4	53	24	+29	46	Promotion Playoffs
3	Bollstanäs SK	22	14	4	4	39	21	+18	46	
4	IK Franke	22	10	7	5	46	29	+17	37	
5	Viggbyholms IK	22	10	6	6	35	30	+5	36	
6	Ängby IF	22	8	3	11	35	45	−10	27	
7	Råsunda IS	22	8	3	11	28	40	−12	27	
8	Uppsala-Näs IK	22	6	5	11	36	44	−8	23	
9	Kungsängens IF	22	7	1	14	35	53	−18	22	Relegation Playoffs – Relegated
10	Upsala IF	22	5	4	13	27	52	−25	19	Relegated
11	Vallentuna BK	22	5	3	14	41	61	−20	18	Relegated
12	Dalhem IF	22	4	5	13	29	49	−20	17	Relegated

=== Västra Svealand 2011 ===
Pos	Team	Pld	W	D	L	GF	GA	GD	Pts	Promotion or relegation
1	Karlslunds IF HFK	22	14	7	1	53	14	+39	49	Promoted
2	Örebro Syrianska IF	22	14	5	3	56	24	+32	47	Promotion Playoffs
3	Nordvärmland FF	22	12	7	3	48	20	+28	43	
4	Strömtorps IK	22	12	6	4	47	28	+19	42	
5	IFK Ölme	22	9	9	4	39	29	+10	36	
6	FBK Karlstad	22	10	2	10	42	40	+2	32	
7	Köping FF	22	7	3	12	36	41	−5	24	
8	Sköllersta IF	22	5	5	12	24	40	−16	20	
9	IFK Örebro	22	5	5	12	22	47	−25	20	Relegation Playoffs – Relegated
10	Arboga Södra IF	22	6	2	14	21	50	−29	20	Relegated
11	Dala-Järna IK	22	5	3	14	21	50	−29	18	Relegated
12	Ludvika FK	22	3	6	13	27	53	−26	15	Relegated

=== Södra Svealand 2011 ===
Pos	Team	Pld	W	D	L	GF	GA	GD	Pts	Promotion or relegation
1	Eskilstuna Södra FF	22	12	5	5	55	32	+23	41	Promoted
2	IFK Eskilstuna	22	12	5	5	53	32	+21	41	Promotion Playoffs
3	Älvsjö AIK FF	22	10	10	2	48	30	+18	40	
4	Brandbergens IF	22	10	3	9	43	36	+7	33	
5	Huddinge IF	22	9	4	9	38	36	+2	31	
6	Bagarmossen Kärrtorp BK	22	9	3	10	45	41	+4	30	
7	Assyriska FF Ungdom	22	8	6	8	37	41	−4	30	
8	Torstorps IF	22	8	5	9	43	38	+5	29	
9	Tyresö FF	22	8	4	10	32	35	−3	28	Relegation Playoffs
10	IK Tellus	22	8	4	10	33	37	−4	28	Relegated
11	Vagnhärads SK	22	7	5	10	28	50	−22	26	Relegated
12	Vendelsö IK	22	3	2	17	27	74	−47	11	Relegated

=== Nordöstra Götaland 2011 ===
Pos	Team	Pld	W	D	L	GF	GA	GD	Pts	Promotion or relegation
1	IF Hagapojkarna	22	13	4	5	42	25	+17	43	Promoted
2	Myresjö IF	22	12	4	6	43	34	+9	40	Promotion Playoffs
3	Söderköpings IK	22	11	4	7	39	28	+11	37	
4	IK Östria Lambohov	22	10	4	8	46	38	+8	34	
5	Gullringens GOIF	22	10	3	9	38	35	+3	33	
6	FK Linköping	22	9	5	8	46	47	−1	32	
7	Hovslätts IK	22	9	4	9	42	46	−4	31	
8	Råslätts SK	22	6	11	5	40	27	+13	29	
9	Ulricehamns IFK	22	7	7	8	35	34	+1	28	Relegation Playoffs
10	Borens IK	22	6	7	9	34	37	−3	25	Relegated
11	Nässjö FF	22	7	2	13	37	46	−9	23	Relegated
12	LSW IF	22	3	3	16	20	65	−45	12	Relegated

=== Nordvästra Götaland 2011 ===
Pos	Team	Pld	W	D	L	GF	GA	GD	Pts	Promotion or relegation
1	IFK Uddevalla	22	17	3	2	69	22	+47	54	Promoted
2	Fässbergs IF	22	15	1	6	52	38	+14	46	Promotion Playoffs
3	Lärje-Angereds IF	22	14	3	5	54	31	+23	45	
4	KF Velebit	22	12	3	7	51	30	+21	39	
5	Melleruds IF	22	11	2	9	52	40	+12	35	
6	IFK Åmål	22	9	4	9	40	32	+8	31	
7	Ahlafors IF	22	7	7	8	36	36	0	28	
8	Lilla Edets IF	22	7	4	11	33	50	−17	25	
9	IFK Trollhättan	22	7	3	12	31	49	−18	24	Relegation Playoffs
10	IF Warta	22	6	1	15	25	58	−33	19	Relegated
11	IF Väster	22	4	5	13	32	55	−23	17	Relegated
12	Skärhamns IK	22	3	4	15	16	50	−34	13	Relegated

=== Mellersta Götaland 2011 ===
Pos	Team	Pld	W	D	L	GF	GA	GD	Pts	Promotion or relegation
1	Sävedalens IF	22	14	4	4	46	29	+17	46	Promoted
2	Lerums IS	22	13	3	6	59	34	+25	42	Promotion Playoffs
3	IF Heimer	22	11	5	6	42	28	+14	38	
4	IFK Mariestad	22	11	5	6	46	33	+13	38	
5	Alingsås IF	22	11	2	9	43	38	+5	35	
6	Holmalunds IF	22	10	4	8	39	31	+8	34	
7	IFK Skövde FK	22	10	3	9	58	42	+16	33	
8	Partille IF	22	10	2	10	32	50	−18	32	
9	Falköpings FK	22	9	1	12	44	48	−4	28	Relegation Playoffs – Relegated
10	Annelunds IF	22	6	5	11	41	51	−10	23	Relegated
11	Sandareds IF	22	7	2	13	34	50	−16	23	Relegated
12	Bollebygds IF	22	1	2	19	25	75	−50	5	Relegated

=== Sydöstra Götaland 2011 ===
Pos	Team	Pld	W	D	L	GF	GA	GD	Pts	Promotion or relegation
1	Oskarshamns AIK	22	18	2	2	64	17	+47	56	Promoted
2	Lyckeby GoIF	22	13	5	4	49	22	+27	44	Promotion Playoffs
3	Moheda IF	22	12	6	4	41	28	+13	42	
4	Rydaholms GoIF	22	10	5	7	41	29	+12	35	
5	Nybro IF	22	10	5	7	35	27	+8	35	
6	Färjestadens GOIF	22	9	5	8	37	39	−2	32	
7	Sillhövda AIK	22	8	5	9	31	40	−9	29	
8	IFK Berga	22	7	7	8	40	37	+3	28	
9	Växjö BK	22	7	2	13	31	44	−13	23	Relegation Playoffs – Relegated
10	Saxemara IF	22	6	4	12	32	43	−11	22	Relegated
11	Ryssby IF	22	2	5	15	21	62	−41	11	Relegated
12	Alstermo IF	22	1	7	14	20	54	−34	10	Relegated

=== Sydvästra Götaland 2011 ===
Pos	Team	Pld	W	D	L	GF	GA	GD	Pts	Promotion or relegation
1	Eskilsminne IF	22	18	1	3	70	23	+47	55	Promoted
2	IFK Hässleholm	22	16	3	3	66	23	+43	51	Promotion Playoffs
3	Höganäs BK	22	13	2	7	66	32	+34	41	
4	Hässleholms IF	22	13	2	7	40	27	+13	41	
5	Älmhults IF	22	12	3	7	49	28	+21	39	
6	Vinbergs IF	22	9	3	10	48	39	+9	30	
7	Stafsinge IF	22	9	3	10	52	46	+6	30	
8	IFK Fjärås	22	9	3	10	44	43	+1	30	
9	Laholms FK	22	9	3	10	39	43	−4	30	Relegation Playoffs – Relegated
10	Markaryds IF	22	7	3	12	41	54	−13	24	Relegated
11	Åstorps FF	22	2	1	19	11	85	−74	7	Relegated
12	Påarps GIF	22	1	1	20	17	100	−83	4	Relegated

=== Södra Götaland 2011 ===
Pos	Team	Pld	W	D	L	GF	GA	GD	Pts	Promotion or relegation
1	Torns IF	22	15	4	3	71	24	+47	49	Promoted
2	BW 90 IF	22	13	3	6	63	29	+34	42	Promotion Playoffs
3	Höörs IS	22	11	6	5	53	28	+25	39	
4	Svedala IF	22	11	1	10	35	34	+1	34	
5	IFK Trelleborg	22	8	8	6	44	38	+6	32	
6	Nosaby IF	22	8	7	7	42	41	+1	31	
7	IFÖ Bromölla IF	22	8	6	8	42	38	+4	30	
8	Malmö City FC	22	9	3	10	34	38	−4	30	
9	Perstorps SK	22	7	6	9	35	41	−6	27	Relegation Playoffs – Relegated
10	FC Trelleborg	22	5	8	9	31	43	−12	23	Relegated
11	Veberöds AIF	22	5	7	10	33	40	−7	22	Relegated
12	Lilla Torg FF	22	2	1	19	16	105	−89	7	Relegated
