= 2010 Division 3 (Swedish football) =

Swedish League Division 3
- Season: 2010
- Champions: Morön BK; Junsele IF; Kvarnsvedens IK; BKV Norrtälje; Rynninge IK; Konyaspor KIF; Assyriska Föreningen; Skoftebyns IF; Tibro AIK FK; Sölvesborgs GoIF; Gislaveds IS; BK Olympic
- Promoted: 12 teams above and: Falu FK; Spårvägens FF; Kållered SK; Tvååkers IF
- Relegated: 46 teams

Statistics of Swedish football Division 3 for the 2010 season.

== League standings ==
=== Norra Norrland 2010 ===
Pos	Team	Pld	W	D	L	GF	GA	GD	Pts	Promotion or relegation
1	Morön BK	22	16	2	4	66	29	+37	50	Promoted
2	Alviks IK	22	15	4	3	63	17	+46	49	Promotion Playoffs
3	Kiruna FF	22	12	7	3	40	21	+19	43	
4	Assi IF	22	11	6	5	57	25	+32	39	
5	Luleå SK	22	10	5	7	71	49	+22	35	
6	Notvikens IK	22	9	5	8	51	45	+6	32	
7	Storfors AIK	22	9	4	9	32	30	+2	31	
8	Gällivare Malmbergets FF	22	8	4	10	45	45	0	28	
9	Sävast AIF	22	6	5	11	26	51	−25	23	Relegation Playoffs – Relegated
10	Ohtana/Aapua FF	22	5	7	10	37	54	−17	22	Relegated
11	Infjärdens SK	22	4	1	17	34	83	−49	13	Relegated
12	Norsjö IF	22	1	2	19	15	88	−73	5	Relegated

=== Mellersta Norrland 2010 ===
Pos	Team	Pld	W	D	L	GF	GA	GD	Pts	Promotion or relegation
1	Junsele IF	22	14	3	5	56	40	+16	45	Promoted
2	Kubikenborgs IF	22	12	2	8	50	38	+12	38	Promotion Playoffs
3	Frösö IF	22	12	2	8	54	44	+10	38	
4	Selånger FK	22	10	4	8	55	45	+10	34	
5	Friska Viljor FC	22	11	1	10	53	52	+1	34	
6	Stuguns BK	22	11	1	10	49	49	0	34	
7	Salsåker-Ullångers IF	22	8	7	7	39	42	−3	31	
8	IFK Östersund	22	10	0	12	34	34	0	30	
9	IFK Umeå	22	7	6	9	41	47	−6	27	Relegation Playoffs
10	Lucksta IF	22	7	5	10	39	42	−3	26	Relegated
11	Ope IF	22	7	3	12	37	52	−15	24	Relegated
12	IFK Timrå	22	4	4	14	31	53	−22	16	Relegated

=== Södra Norrland 2010 ===
Pos	Team	Pld	W	D	L	GF	GA	GD	Pts	Promotion or relegation
1	Kvarnsvedens IK	22	15	5	2	53	18	+35	50	Promoted
2	Falu FK	22	15	4	3	80	23	+57	49	Promotion Playoffs – Promoted
3	IK Huge	22	14	3	5	42	19	+23	45	
4	Hille IF	22	11	7	4	36	25	+11	40	
5	Söderhamns FF	22	9	4	9	42	43	−1	31	
6	Rengsjö SK	22	7	6	9	39	43	−4	27	
7	Dala-Järna IK	22	7	6	9	36	41	−5	27	
8	Trönö IK	22	9	0	13	29	57	−28	27	
9	Brynäs IF FK	22	8	2	12	49	54	−5	26	Relegation Playoffs
10	Strands IF	22	7	3	12	30	35	−5	24	Relegated
11	Korsnäs IF FK	22	4	5	13	25	43	−18	17	Relegated
12	Valbo FF	22	2	3	17	18	78	−60	9	Relegated

=== Norra Svealand 2010 ===
Pos	Team	Pld	W	D	L	GF	GA	GD	Pts	Promotion or relegation
1	BKV Norrtälje	22	13	6	3	53	23	+30	45	Promoted
2	Bollstanäs SK	22	11	6	5	39	26	+13	39	Promotion Playoffs
3	Dalhem IF	22	10	7	5	48	35	+13	37	
4	Karlbergs BK	22	11	4	7	30	28	+2	37	
5	Heby AIF	22	10	4	8	45	26	+19	34	
6	Råsunda IS	22	9	5	8	37	40	−3	32	
7	Kungsängens IF	22	8	5	9	45	38	+7	29	
8	Bagarmossens BK	22	7	8	7	42	44	−2	29	
9	Spånga IS FK	22	8	4	10	41	46	−5	28	Relegation Playoffs – Relegated
10	IFK Uppsala	22	6	5	11	37	47	−10	23	Relegated
11	Täby IS	22	3	7	12	26	45	−19	16	Relegated
12	FC Järfälla	22	5	1	16	33	78	−45	16	Relegated

=== Västra Svealand 2010 ===
Pos	Team	Pld	W	D	L	GF	GA	GD	Pts	Promotion or relegation
1	Rynninge IK	22	14	4	4	57	15	+42	46	Promoted
2	Örebro Syrianska IF	22	14	2	6	44	29	+15	44	Promotion Playoffs
3	IFK Örebro	22	12	4	6	35	38	−3	40	
4	IFK Eskilstuna	22	11	5	6	45	32	+13	38	
5	IK Franke	22	11	3	8	41	30	+11	36	
6	FBK Karlstad	22	11	2	9	40	43	−3	35	
7	Ludvika FK	22	7	4	11	32	38	−6	25	
8	IFK Ölme	22	6	7	9	32	38	−6	25	
9	IFK Sunne	22	7	4	11	25	36	−11	25	Relegation Playoffs – Relegated
10	SK Sifhälla	22	7	2	13	24	40	−16	23	Relegated
11	FK Bosna 92 Örebro	22	6	2	14	30	50	−20	20	Relegated
12	Adolfsbergs IK	22	4	5	13	25	41	−16	17	Relegated

=== Södra Svealand 2010 ===
Pos	Team	Pld	W	D	L	GF	GA	GD	Pts	Promotion or relegation
1	Konyaspor KIF	22	13	6	3	37	17	+20	45	Promoted
2	Spårvägens FF	22	12	7	3	50	23	+27	43	Promotion Playoffs – Promoted
3	Älvsjö AIK FF	22	12	5	5	60	36	+24	41	
4	Tyresö FF	22	10	8	4	48	35	+13	38	
5	Assyriska FF Ungdom	22	12	1	9	51	45	+6	37	
6	Huddinge IF	22	10	4	8	41	39	+2	34	
7	Vagnhärads SK	22	8	8	6	36	33	+3	32	
8	IK Tellus	22	7	4	11	44	45	−1	25	
9	Mälarhöjdens IK	22	6	5	11	27	45	−18	23	Relegation Playoffs – Relegated
10	Enhörna IF	22	5	5	12	36	47	−11	20	Relegated
11	Långholmen FC	22	3	8	11	29	51	−22	17	Relegated
12	Panellinios IF	22	1	5	16	16	59	−43	8	Relegated

=== Nordöstra Götaland 2010 ===
Pos	Team	Pld	W	D	L	GF	GA	GD	Pts	Promotion or relegation
1	Assyriska IF Norrköping	22	18	0	4	51	21	+30	54	Promoted
2	Oskarshamns AIK	22	15	2	5	63	26	+37	47	Promotion Playoffs
3	Söderköpings IK	22	13	5	4	45	21	+24	44	
4	Myresjö IF	22	13	4	5	40	29	+11	43	
5	IK Östria Lambohov	22	9	6	7	38	40	−2	33	
6	IF Hagapojkarna	22	8	6	8	29	31	−2	30	
7	Nässjö FF	22	8	5	9	37	45	−8	29	
8	Gullringens GOIF	22	8	4	10	43	37	+6	28	
9	LSW IF	22	7	5	10	37	47	−10	26	Relegation Playoffs
10	Kisa BK	22	5	3	14	30	52	−22	18	Relegated
11	Mjölby AI FF	22	3	4	15	20	43	−23	13	Relegated
12	Norrköpings IF Bosna	22	1	4	17	22	63	−41	7	Relegated

=== Nordvästra Götaland 2010 ===
Pos	Team	Pld	W	D	L	GF	GA	GD	Pts	Promotion or relegation
1	Skoftebyns IF	22	14	6	2	42	17	+25	48	Promoted
2	IF Warta	22	14	4	4	52	32	+20	46	Promotion Playoffs
3	IF Väster	22	13	2	7	65	39	+26	41	
4	Lilla Edets IF	22	11	5	6	32	21	+11	38	
5	Melleruds IF	22	10	5	7	42	41	+1	35	
6	IFK Uddevalla	22	9	3	10	40	38	+2	30	
7	IFK Trollhättan	22	8	6	8	37	39	−2	30	
8	Ahlafors IF	22	5	8	9	30	33	−3	23	
9	Kärra/Klareberg IF	22	7	2	13	39	58	−19	23	Relegation Playoffs – Relegated
10	Vänersborgs IF	22	7	1	14	36	48	−12	22	Relegated
11	IF Viken	22	5	7	10	36	48	−12	22	Relegated
12	Åsebro IF	22	4	1	17	30	67	−37	13	Relegated

=== Mellersta Götaland 2010 ===
Pos	Team	Pld	W	D	L	GF	GA	GD	Pts	Promotion or relegation
1	Tibro AIK FK	22	14	3	5	65	32	+33	45	Promoted
2	Kållered SK	22	14	1	7	45	20	+25	43	Promotion Playoffs – Promoted
3	IFK Mariestad	22	13	2	7	50	30	+20	41	
4	IF Heimer	22	11	3	8	38	35	+3	36	
5	Sävedalens IF	22	10	4	8	45	41	+4	34	
6	Lerums IS	22	10	3	9	36	40	−4	33	
7	Ulricehamns IFK	22	9	3	10	31	30	+1	30	
8	Bollebygds IF	22	9	3	10	31	40	−9	30	
9	Ulvåkers IF	22	7	3	12	36	44	−8	24	Relegation Playoffs – Relegated
10	IFK Falköping FF	22	7	3	12	20	32	−12	24	Relegated
11	Skene IF	22	6	2	14	18	44	−26	20	Relegated
12	Mariedals IK	22	5	4	13	28	55	−27	19	Relegated

=== Sydöstra Götaland 2010 ===
Pos	Team	Pld	W	D	L	GF	GA	GD	Pts	Promotion or relegation
1	Sölvesborgs GoIF	22	12	5	5	49	30	+19	41	Promoted
2	Älmhults IF	22	11	6	5	45	27	+18	39	Promotion Playoffs
3	Växjö BK	22	11	4	7	39	33	+6	37	
4	Lyckeby GoIF	22	10	6	6	34	28	+6	36	
5	Färjestadens GOIF	22	9	5	8	32	36	−4	32	
6	Rydaholms GoIF	22	10	1	11	39	37	+2	31	
7	Moheda IF	22	7	8	7	33	34	−1	29	
8	Saxemara IF	22	7	8	7	33	34	−1	29	
9	FK Älmeboda/Linneryd	22	6	9	7	29	29	0	27	Relegation Playoffs – Relegated
10	Emmaboda IS	22	6	5	11	27	37	−10	23	Relegated
11	Räppe GOIF	22	5	5	12	23	46	−23	20	Relegated
12	IFK Karlshamn	22	5	4	13	38	50	−12	19	Relegated

=== Sydvästra Götaland 2010 ===
Pos	Team	Pld	W	D	L	GF	GA	GD	Pts	Promotion or relegation
1	Gislaveds IS	22	14	2	6	56	27	+29	44	Promoted
2	Tvååkers IF	22	12	7	3	41	22	+19	43	Promotion Playoffs – Promoted
3	Eskilsminne IF	22	12	5	5	69	28	+41	41	
4	Laholms FK	22	12	5	5	57	28	+29	41	
5	IFK Fjärås	22	13	0	9	59	45	+14	39	
6	Höganäs BK	22	10	5	7	52	31	+21	35	
7	Markaryds IF	22	9	5	8	57	34	+23	32	
8	Påarps GIF	22	7	6	9	46	41	+5	27	
9	Trönninge BK	22	8	3	11	41	51	−10	27	Relegation Playoffs – Relegated
10	Snöstorp Nyhem FF	22	7	5	10	48	39	+9	26	Relegated
11	Lerkils IF	22	5	2	15	38	59	−21	17	Relegated
12	Asmundtorps IF	22	0	1	21	12	171	−159	1	Relegated

=== Södra Götaland 2010 ===
Pos	Team	Pld	W	D	L	GF	GA	GD	Pts	Promotion or relegation
1	BK Olympic	22	15	4	3	57	29	+28	49	Promoted
2	Höörs IS	22	14	3	5	58	21	+37	45	Promotion Playoffs
3	Nosaby IF	22	14	3	5	55	29	+26	45	
4	FC Trelleborg	22	12	5	5	40	30	+10	41	
5	IFK Trelleborg	22	8	6	8	34	35	−1	30	
6	IFÖ Bromölla IF	22	8	4	10	32	36	−4	28	
7	Svedala IF	22	9	1	12	36	48	−12	28	
8	Malmö City FC	22	7	4	11	46	46	0	25	
9	IFK Malmö FK	22	8	1	13	27	51	−24	25	Relegation Playoffs – Relegated
10	Eslövs BK	22	5	6	11	30	35	−5	21	Relegated
11	FBK Balkan	22	5	3	14	28	49	−21	18	Relegated
12	MF Pelister	22	4	6	12	30	64	−34	18	Relegated
