= 2008 Division 3 (Swedish football) =

Swedish League Division 3
- Season: 2008
- Champions: Alviks IK; IF Älgarna; Dalkurd FF; Gamla Upsala SK; Köping FF; Värmdö IF; Nässjö FF; Ytterby IS; IK Gauthiod; IFÖ Bromölla IF; IS Halmia; Lilla Torg FF
- Promoted: 12 teams above and Sollefteå GIF FF; Spånga IS FK
- Relegated: 36 teams

Statistics of Swedish football Division 3 for the 2008 season.

== League standings ==
=== Norra Norrland 2008 ===
Pos	Team	Pld	W	D	L	GF	GA	GD	Pts	Promotion or relegation
1	Alviks IK	22	13	3	6	51	30	+21	42	Promoted
2	Ohtana/Aapua FF	22	12	5	5	55	33	+22	41	Promotion Playoffs
3	Sävast AIF	22	11	3	8	37	28	+9	36	
4	Notvikens IK	22	10	4	8	50	36	+14	34	
5	Hemmingsmarks IF	22	10	4	8	51	42	+9	34	
6	Gällivare Malmbergets FF	22	9	5	8	32	29	+3	32	
7	Morön BK	22	8	7	7	39	30	+9	31	
8	Assi IF	22	7	7	8	36	33	+3	28	
9	Luleå FF	22	7	6	9	34	44	−10	27	
10	Sunnanå SK	22	6	5	11	48	52	−4	23	Relegated
11	Älvsby IF	22	6	4	12	31	64	−33	22	Relegated
12	Bureå IF	22	6	1	15	28	71	−43	19	Relegated

=== Mellersta Norrland 2008 ===
Pos	Team	Pld	W	D	L	GF	GA	GD	Pts	Promotion or relegation
1	IF Älgarna	22	16	3	3	53	20	+33	51	Promoted
2	Sollefteå GIF FF	22	15	4	3	39	12	+27	49	Promotion Playoffs – Promoted
3	Ytterhogdals IK	22	16	1	5	53	34	+19	49	
4	IFK Sundsvall	22	12	2	8	48	49	−1	38	
5	Kubikenborgs IF	22	11	1	10	37	34	+3	34	
6	Frösö IF	22	8	6	8	40	33	+7	30	
7	IFK Östersund	22	8	5	9	42	33	+9	29	
8	Sandåkerns SK	22	8	4	10	54	46	+8	28	
9	Junsele IF	22	5	5	12	28	51	−23	20	
10	Stuguns BK	22	5	4	13	27	33	−6	19	Relegated
11	Krokom Dvärsätts IF	22	5	2	15	21	57	−36	17	Relegated
12	Lycksele IF	22	3	3	16	18	58	−40	12	Relegated

=== Södra Norrland 2008 ===
Pos	Team	Pld	W	D	L	GF	GA	GD	Pts	Promotion or relegation
1	Dalkurd FF	20	19	0	1	74	14	+60	57	Promoted
2	Kvarnsvedens IK	20	12	1	7	49	25	+24	37	Promotion Playoffs
3	Rengsjö SK	20	11	3	6	36	33	+3	36	
4	IK Huge	20	10	5	5	36	23	+13	35	
5	Medskogsbrons BK	20	8	3	9	46	34	+12	27	
6	Dala-Järna IK	20	8	3	9	33	46	−13	27	
7	IF Tunabro	20	6	4	10	32	50	−18	22	
8	Valbo FF	20	6	4	10	33	56	−23	22	
9	Järbo IF	20	5	6	9	27	38	−11	21	
10	Delsbo IF	20	5	2	13	24	41	−17	17	Relegated
11	Bollnäs GIF FF	20	3	3	14	22	52	−30	12	Relegated

Gestrike/Hammarby IF Withdrew

=== Norra Svealand 2008 ===
Pos	Team	Pld	W	D	L	GF	GA	GD	Pts	Promotion or relegation
1	Gamla Upsala SK	22	15	5	2	52	21	+31	50	Promoted
2	Spånga IS FK	22	14	0	8	47	28	+19	42	Promotion Playoffs – Promoted
3	FC Järfälla	22	12	2	8	48	43	+5	38	
4	Täby IS	22	11	4	7	42	31	+11	37	
5	BKV Norrtälje	22	10	5	7	39	36	+3	35	
6	Strömsbergs IF	22	8	6	8	43	39	+4	30	
7	Gimo IF FK	22	9	3	10	38	41	−3	30	
8	Karlbergs BK	22	8	6	8	42	48	−6	30	
9	Assyriska Rinkeby IF	22	8	4	10	31	37	−6	28	
10	Bälinge IF	22	5	6	11	29	50	−21	21	Relegated
11	Värtans IK	22	4	5	13	30	46	−16	17	Relegated
12	Ängby IF	22	4	2	16	29	50	−21	14	Relegated

=== Västra Svealand 2008 ===
Pos	Team	Pld	W	D	L	GF	GA	GD	Pts	Promotion or relegation
1	Köping FF	22	16	1	5	61	27	+34	49	Promoted
2	Karlstad BK	22	13	4	5	57	30	+27	43	Promotion Playoffs
3	Arboga Södra IF	22	13	4	5	50	31	+19	43	
4	Örebro SK Ungdom	22	13	4	5	45	31	+14	43	
5	Örebro Syrianska BK	22	11	6	5	46	26	+20	39	
6	IFK Örebro	22	11	2	9	27	25	+2	35	
7	IFK Ölme	22	7	9	6	41	38	+3	30	
8	FBK Karlstad	22	8	6	8	47	50	−3	30	
9	Adolfsbergs IK	22	8	6	8	24	28	−4	30	
10	IFK Kumla	22	3	2	17	20	63	−43	11	Relegated
11	Ludvika FK	22	2	4	16	24	53	−29	10	Relegated
12	IF Eker Örebro	22	1	4	17	20	60	−40	7	Relegated

=== Södra Svealand 2008 ===
Pos	Team	Pld	W	D	L	GF	GA	GD	Pts	Promotion or relegation
1	Värmdö IF	22	15	4	3	54	18	+36	49	Promoted
2	Huddinge IF	22	14	2	6	50	34	+16	44	Promotion Playoffs
3	Spårvägens FF	22	13	3	6	47	24	+23	42	
4	FOC Farsta	22	13	1	8	47	31	+16	40	
5	Bagarmossens BK	22	10	3	9	45	42	+3	33	
6	Konyaspor KIF	22	9	5	8	35	32	+3	32	
7	Tyresö FF	22	9	4	9	44	36	+8	31	
8	Rotebro IS FF	22	9	3	10	49	49	0	30	
9	IK Tellus	22	8	5	9	37	38	−1	29	
10	IK Viljan	22	8	5	9	34	45	−11	29	Relegated
11	Vagnhärads SK	22	2	4	16	33	61	−28	10	Relegated
12	BK Saturnus	22	2	1	19	23	88	−65	7	Relegated

=== Nordöstra Götaland 2008 ===
Pos	Team	Pld	W	D	L	GF	GA	GD	Pts	Promotion or relegation
1	Nässjö FF	22	14	6	2	50	22	+28	48	Promoted
2	Assyriska IF Norrköping	22	14	3	5	55	29	+26	45	Promotion Playoffs
3	LSW IF	22	12	4	6	45	31	+14	40	
4	Vimmerby IF	22	11	4	7	44	31	+13	37	
5	IF Hagapojkarna	22	11	4	7	40	34	+6	37	
6	Söderköpings IK	22	10	4	8	41	28	+13	34	
7	Råslätts SK	22	9	5	8	49	58	−9	32	
8	Gullringens GOIF	22	9	4	9	41	42	−1	31	
9	IK Östria Lambohov	22	8	3	11	35	44	−9	27	
10	Mjölby AI FF	22	7	4	11	46	52	−6	25	Relegated
11	Katrineholms SK FK	22	4	1	17	33	66	−33	13	Relegated
12	BK Derby	22	1	2	19	19	61	−42	5	Relegated

=== Nordvästra Götaland 2008 ===
Pos	Team	Pld	W	D	L	GF	GA	GD	Pts	Promotion or relegation
1	Ytterby IS	22	15	3	4	54	28	+26	48	Promoted
2	Skoftebyns IF	22	14	3	5	57	28	+29	45	Promotion Playoffs
3	Sävedalens IF	22	12	6	4	45	31	+14	42	
4	IF Warta	22	13	2	7	57	38	+19	41	
5	Holmalunds IF	22	10	7	5	43	31	+12	37	
6	Lilla Edets IF	22	9	4	9	34	35	−1	31	
7	IK Kongahälla	22	7	5	10	33	46	−13	26	
8	Åsebro IF	22	6	7	9	38	43	−5	25	
9	IF Viken	22	7	3	12	35	41	−6	24	
10	Gerdskens BK	22	7	2	13	31	50	−19	23	Relegated
11	IFK Åmål	22	5	2	15	35	62	−27	17	Relegated
12	Stenungsunds IF	22	4	2	16	26	55	−29	14	Relegated

=== Mellersta Götaland 2008 ===
Pos	Team	Pld	W	D	L	GF	GA	GD	Pts	Promotion or relegation
1	IK Gauthiod	22	17	3	2	48	21	+27	54	Promoted
2	Tibro AIK FK	22	12	6	4	45	19	+26	42	Promotion Playoffs
3	Grimsås IF	22	11	5	6	37	29	+8	38	
4	Åsarp-Trädet FK	22	11	4	7	40	33	+7	37	
5	Byttorps IF	22	9	5	8	34	39	−5	32	
6	Ulvåkers IF	22	8	6	8	40	40	0	30	
7	Mariedals IK	22	8	5	9	40	29	+11	29	
8	IFK Mariestad	22	8	4	10	26	32	−6	28	
9	IF Heimer	22	7	5	10	35	35	0	26	
10	IFK Falköping FF	22	6	5	11	28	39	−11	23	Relegated
11	Skara FC	22	4	3	15	31	59	−28	15	Relegated
12	Sandareds IF	22	4	3	15	18	47	−29	15	Relegated

=== Sydöstra Götaland 2008 ===
Pos	Team	Pld	W	D	L	GF	GA	GD	Pts	Promotion or relegation
1	IFÖ Bromölla IF	22	14	4	4	48	22	+26	46	Promoted
2	Saxemara IF	22	13	6	3	51	26	+25	45	Promotion Playoffs
3	Älmhults IF	22	12	6	4	51	25	+26	42	
4	Nosaby IF	22	12	4	6	61	27	+34	40	
5	VMA IK	22	12	3	7	54	29	+25	39	
6	Rydaholms GoIF	22	11	6	5	57	35	+22	39	
7	Oskarshamns AIK	22	9	3	10	34	35	−1	30	
8	Gransholms IF	22	6	6	10	32	37	−5	24	
9	FK Älmeboda/Linneryd	22	5	8	9	39	52	−13	23	
10	Rödeby AIF	22	6	3	13	35	59	−24	21	Relegated
11	Växjö Norra IF	22	6	2	14	30	45	−15	20	Relegated
12	Kalmar AIK FK	22	0	1	21	15	115	−100	1	Relegated

=== Sydvästra Götaland 2008 ===
Pos	Team	Pld	W	D	L	GF	GA	GD	Pts	Promotion or relegation
1	IS Halmia	22	19	2	1	83	25	+58	59	Promoted
2	Skene IF	22	15	1	6	54	30	+24	46	Promotion Playoffs
3	IFK Fjärås	22	12	5	5	65	37	+28	41	
4	Åstorps FF	22	12	4	6	45	38	+7	40	
5	Tvååkers IF	22	11	3	8	40	34	+6	36	
6	Dalen/Krokslätt FF	22	9	4	9	43	43	0	31	
7	IF Väster	22	10	0	12	43	41	+2	30	
8	Lerkils IF	22	8	4	10	42	50	−8	28	
9	Slottsskogen/Godhem IF	22	8	2	12	41	49	−8	26	
10	Torekovs IK	22	8	0	14	37	60	−23	24	Relegated
11	IFK Örby	22	4	2	16	33	63	−30	14	Relegated
12	Hinneryds IF	22	2	1	19	31	87	−56	7	Relegated

=== Södra Götaland 2008 ===
Pos	Team	Pld	W	D	L	GF	GA	GD	Pts	Promotion or relegation
1	Lilla Torg FF	22	13	8	1	58	26	+32	47	Promoted
2	Tomelilla IF	22	13	5	4	37	17	+20	44	Promotion Playoffs
3	Eslövs BK	22	12	5	5	42	24	+18	41	
4	Stavsten/Ymor FK	22	11	6	5	50	34	+16	39	
5	Veberöds AIF	22	11	3	8	46	38	+8	36	
6	IFK Trelleborg	22	8	6	8	38	44	−6	30	
7	IF Lödde	22	8	4	10	37	38	−1	28	
8	Kirseberg IF	22	7	5	10	44	44	0	26	
9	Höganäs BK	22	7	3	12	44	57	−13	24	
10	Gantofta IF	22	5	5	12	30	48	−18	20	Relegated
11	Hässleholms IF	22	6	2	14	32	57	−25	20	Relegated
12	Sjöbo IF	22	2	6	14	35	66	−31	12	Relegated
