= 2006 Division 3 (Swedish football) =

Swedish League Division 3
- Season: 2006
- Champions: Luleå FF; IFK Holmsund; Heby AIF; IK Frej; Värmbols FC; KB Karlskoga FF; Smedby AIS; Melleruds IF; Fässbergs IF; FK Älmeboda/Linneryd; Högaborgs BK; GIF Nike
- Promoted: 12 teams above
- Relegated: 45 teams

Statistics of Swedish football Division 3 for the 2006 season.

== League standings ==
=== Norra Norrland 2006 ===
Pos	Team	Pld	W	D	L	GF	GA	GD	Pts	Promotion or relegation
1	Luleå FF	22	14	2	6	46	24	+22	44	Promoted
2	Gällivare/Malmberget FF	22	12	8	2	42	20	+22	44	Promotion Playoffs
3	Notvikens IK	22	13	4	5	46	28	+18	43	
4	Malå IF	22	13	2	7	52	39	+13	41	
5	Alviks IK	22	11	6	5	60	36	+24	39	
6	Hemmingsmarks IF	22	9	4	9	38	42	−4	31	
7	Sunnanå SK	22	8	6	8	40	38	+2	30	
8	Ohtanajärvi/Aapua FF	22	8	2	12	34	45	−11	26	
9	Morön BK	22	6	5	11	25	32	−7	23	Relegation Playoffs
10	Betsele IF	22	7	2	13	36	49	−13	23	Relegated
11	Luleå SK	22	6	1	15	29	52	−23	19	Relegated
12	Bureå IF	22	2	4	16	22	65	−43	10	Relegated

=== Mellersta Norrland 2006 ===
Pos	Team	Pld	W	D	L	GF	GA	GD	Pts	Promotion or relegation
1	IFK Holmsund	22	11	7	4	42	22	+20	40	Promoted
2	Stockviks FF	22	10	9	3	56	23	+33	39	Promotion Playoffs
3	IFK Östersund	22	10	7	5	39	25	+14	37	
4	Krokom/Dvärsätt IF	22	11	2	9	45	28	+17	35	
5	Junsele IF	22	10	5	7	42	35	+7	35	
6	Söderhamns FF	22	9	5	8	40	32	+8	32	
7	Ope IF	22	8	8	6	33	30	+3	32	
8	Svartviks IF	22	8	7	7	33	37	−4	31	
9	Sollefteå GIF	22	7	7	8	25	29	−4	28	Relegation Playoffs – Relegated
10	Sandåkerns SK	22	6	5	11	37	50	−13	23	Relegated
11	Bergs IK	22	5	1	16	22	64	−42	16	Relegated
12	Harmångers IF	22	3	5	14	27	66	−39	14	Relegated

=== Södra Norrland 2006 ===
Pos	Team	Pld	W	D	L	GF	GA	GD	Pts	Promotion or relegation
1	Heby AIF	22	15	4	3	49	27	+22	49	Promoted
2	Bollnäs GIF FF	22	15	3	4	66	23	+43	48	Promotion Playoffs
3	Valbo FF	22	9	7	6	48	43	+5	34	
4	Gimo IF FK	22	9	6	7	50	42	+8	33	
5	Gestrike-Hammarby IF	22	7	10	5	33	27	+6	31	
6	Kvarnsvedens IK	22	8	7	7	45	47	−2	31	
7	Korsnäs IF FK	22	9	2	11	45	45	0	29	
8	Dala-Järna IK	22	9	2	11	27	46	−19	29	
9	Järbo IF	22	7	5	10	36	44	−8	26	Relegation Playoffs – Relegated
10	Rengsjö SK	22	6	7	9	45	52	−7	25	Relegated
11	Forssa BK	22	5	7	10	33	52	−19	22	Relegated
12	Edsbyns IF FF	22	1	4	17	24	53	−29	7	Relegated

=== Norra Svealand 2006 ===
Pos	Team	Pld	W	D	L	GF	GA	GD	Pts	Promotion or relegation
1	IK Frej	22	15	6	1	80	25	+55	51	Promoted
2	Akropolis IF	22	14	6	2	48	22	+26	48	Promotion Playoffs
3	FC Järfälla	22	14	5	3	56	27	+29	47	
4	Gamla Upsala SK	22	11	4	7	54	34	+20	37	
5	Ängby IF	22	10	4	8	52	29	+23	34	
6	Råsunda IS	22	10	4	8	40	27	+13	34	
7	Spånga IS FK	22	10	3	9	52	37	+15	33	
8	IK Fyris	22	9	5	8	44	43	+1	32	
9	Enköpings IS	22	8	3	11	43	50	−7	27	Relegation Playoffs
10	IFK Lidingö FK	22	6	3	13	28	58	−30	21	Relegated
11	Bollstanäs SK	22	2	1	19	22	91	−69	7	Relegated
12	IFK Sollentuna	22	1	0	21	22	98	−76	3	Relegated

=== Östra Svealand 2006 ===
Pos	Team	Pld	W	D	L	GF	GA	GD	Pts	Promotion or relegation
1	Värmbols FC	22	11	7	4	38	29	+9	40	Promoted
2	Huddinge IF	22	11	3	8	57	44	+13	36	Promotion Playoffs
3	Konyaspor KIF	22	9	9	4	34	25	+9	36	
4	Värmdö IF	22	10	5	7	54	36	+18	35	
5	Segeltorps IF	22	10	4	8	45	37	+8	34	
6	Katrineholms SK FK	22	9	5	8	40	42	−2	32	
7	Vagnhärads SK	22	9	5	8	37	39	−2	32	
8	FoC Farsta	22	8	7	7	50	39	+11	31	
9	Tyresö FF	22	8	6	8	49	34	+15	30	Relegation Playoffs – Relegated
10	IK Viljan	22	8	2	12	38	42	−4	26	Relegated
11	Reymersholms IK	22	5	5	12	23	39	−16	20	Relegated
12	IFK Visby	22	4	2	16	30	85	−55	14	Relegated

=== Västra Svealand 2006 ===
Pos	Team	Pld	W	D	L	GF	GA	GD	Pts	Promotion or relegation
1	KB Karlskoga FF	22	15	2	5	54	30	+24	47	Promoted
2	Strömtorps IK	22	14	1	7	42	21	+21	43	Promotion Playoffs
3	Köping FF	22	13	2	7	50	30	+20	41	
4	Karlslunds IF HFK	22	12	4	6	55	27	+28	40	
5	IFK Kumla FK	22	11	6	5	54	30	+24	39	
6	Örebro SK Ungdom	22	11	6	5	50	39	+11	39	
7	IK Franke	22	8	4	10	35	55	−20	28	
8	Ludvika FK	22	6	7	9	31	41	−10	25	
9	Laxå IF	22	7	2	13	29	52	−23	23	Relegation Playoffs – Relegated
10	IFK Örebro	22	5	3	14	26	35	−9	18	Relegated
11	IFK Västerås FK	22	4	5	13	20	47	−27	17	Relegated
12	Hertzöga BK	22	4	2	16	27	66	−39	14	Relegated

=== Nordöstra Götaland 2006 ===
Pos	Team	Pld	W	D	L	GF	GA	GD	Pts	Promotion or relegation
1	Smedby AIS	22	14	8	0	58	17	+41	50	Promoted
2	BK Kenty	22	12	9	1	50	22	+28	45	Promotion Playoffs – Promoted
3	Assyriska IF Norrköping	22	11	6	5	44	27	+17	39	
4	Gullringens GoIF	22	12	3	7	49	38	+11	39	
5	Mjölby AI FF	22	8	8	6	40	31	+9	32	
6	Aneby SK	22	8	5	9	36	44	−8	29	
7	Västerviks FF	22	7	6	9	27	34	−7	27	
8	Hultsfreds FK	22	8	1	13	36	46	−10	25	
9	Nässjö FF	22	6	4	12	33	49	−16	22	Relegation Playoffs
10	BK Derby	22	5	5	12	33	54	−21	20	Relegated
11	BK Zeros	22	5	3	14	23	45	−22	18	Relegated
12	IF Hagapojkarna	22	3	8	11	17	39	−22	17	Relegated

=== Nordvästra Götaland 2006 ===
Pos	Team	Pld	W	D	L	GF	GA	GD	Pts	Promotion or relegation
1	Melleruds IF	22	17	2	3	67	29	+38	53	Promoted
2	Ahlafors IF	22	14	4	4	62	36	+26	46	Promotion Playoffs – Promoted
3	Sävedalens IF	22	14	4	4	67	43	+24	46	
4	Ytterby IS	22	13	2	7	45	32	+13	41	
5	Åsebro IF	22	10	5	7	54	35	+19	35	
6	IK Kongahälla	22	10	4	8	48	38	+10	34	
7	Slottsskogen/Godhem IF	22	11	1	10	48	48	0	34	
8	IF Väster	22	9	3	10	41	42	−1	30	
9	Kungshamns IF	22	7	3	12	47	67	−20	24	Relegation Playoffs
10	KF Velebit	22	7	2	13	33	45	−12	23	Relegated
11	Grebbestads IF	22	3	1	18	30	75	−45	10	Relegated
12	Vallens IF	22	1	1	20	15	67	−52	4	Relegated

=== Mellersta Götaland 2006 ===
Pos	Team	Pld	W	D	L	GF	GA	GD	Pts	Promotion or relegation
1	Fässbergs IF	22	17	2	3	49	23	+26	53	Promoted
2	IK Gauthiod	22	13	5	4	51	27	+24	44	Promotion Playoffs
3	Holmalunds IF	22	13	1	8	56	35	+21	40	
4	IFK Falköping FF	22	11	5	6	42	27	+15	38	
5	IFK Mariestad	22	10	4	8	46	38	+8	34	
6	Gerdskens BK	22	8	6	8	39	33	+6	30	
7	Mariedals IK	22	9	3	10	36	42	−6	30	
8	Kållereds SK	22	7	6	9	34	44	−10	27	
9	Annelunds IF	22	7	5	10	35	42	−7	26	Relegation Playoffs – Relegated
10	Svenljunga IK	22	6	2	14	28	50	−22	20	Relegated
11	IFK Örby	22	4	4	14	31	62	−31	16	Relegated
12	IFK Tidaholm	22	4	3	15	31	55	−24	15	Relegated

=== Sydöstra Götaland 2006 ===
Pos	Team	Pld	W	D	L	GF	GA	GD	Pts	Promotion or relegation
1	FK Älmeboda/Linneryd	22	15	2	5	54	31	+23	47	Promoted
2	Lindsdals IF	22	14	2	6	55	33	+22	44	Promotion Playoffs – Promoted
3	Nybro IF	22	13	2	7	40	30	+10	41	
4	Färjestadens GoIF	22	12	1	9	47	42	+5	37	
5	Växjö Norra IF	22	11	2	9	51	38	+13	35	
6	Saxemara IF	22	10	4	8	27	32	−5	34	
7	Kalmar AIK FK	22	10	3	9	40	37	+3	33	
8	VMA IK	22	9	4	9	43	28	+15	31	
9	Oskarshamns AIK	22	9	3	10	39	45	−6	30	Relegation Playoffs – Relegated
10	Ronneby BK	22	5	7	10	39	48	−9	22	Relegated
11	Högadals IS	22	3	3	16	16	55	−39	12	Relegated
12	Rödeby AIF	22	2	5	15	26	58	−32	11	Relegated

=== Sydvästra Götaland 2006 ===
Pos	Team	Pld	W	D	L	GF	GA	GD	Pts	Promotion or relegation
1	Högaborgs BK	22	19	3	0	78	18	+60	60	Promoted
2	Åstorps FF	22	12	6	4	49	27	+22	42	Promotion Playoffs
3	IF Leikin	22	12	4	6	42	24	+18	40	
4	Snöstorp Nyhem FF	22	9	3	10	27	39	−12	30	
5	IS Halmia	22	7	8	7	35	34	+1	29	
6	Markaryds IF	22	9	2	11	30	38	−8	29	
7	Sennans IF	22	7	7	8	35	36	−1	28	
8	Höganäs BK	22	7	6	9	25	32	−7	27	
9	BK Astrio	22	7	4	11	38	50	−12	25	Relegation Playoffs – Relegated
10	Ödåkra IF	22	7	4	11	31	43	−12	25	Relegated
11	Varbergs GIF FF	22	7	2	13	36	41	−5	23	Relegated
12	Anderstorps IF	22	3	3	16	16	60	−44	12	Relegated

=== Södra Götaland 2006 ===
Pos	Team	Pld	W	D	L	GF	GA	GD	Pts	Promotion or relegation
1	GIF Nike	22	16	1	5	49	24	+25	49	Promoted
2	Limhamns IF	22	15	3	4	60	24	+36	48	Promotion Playoffs
3	Stavsten/Ymor FK	22	11	3	8	42	39	+3	36	
4	Kulladals FF	22	10	4	8	46	45	+1	34	
5	Ystads IF FF	22	10	3	9	42	41	+1	33	
6	Tomelilla IF	22	9	5	8	38	33	+5	32	
7	FBK Balkan	22	9	3	10	38	51	−13	30	
8	Sjöbo IF	22	9	2	11	51	44	+7	29	
9	Åhus Horna BK	22	7	5	10	33	48	−15	26	Relegation Playoffs – Relegated
10	Branteviks IF	22	7	4	11	33	34	−1	25	Relegated
11	BK Näset/Höllviken	22	5	5	12	39	53	−14	20	Relegated
12	Tollarps IF	22	2	6	14	24	60	−36	12	Relegated
