= 2007 Division 3 (Swedish football) =

Swedish League Division 3
- Season: 2007
- Champions: Piteå IF; Mariehem SK; Söderhamns FF; Råsunda IS; Panellinios IF; Karlslunds IF HFK; Lindö FF; Utsiktens BK; Annelunds IF>; Nybro IF; Markaryds IF; Asmundtorps IF
- Promoted: 12 teams above and: Turebergs IF; IFK Klagshamn
- Relegated: 44 teams

Statistics of Swedish football Division 3 for the 2007 season.

== League standings ==
=== Norra Norrland 2007 ===
Pos	Team	Pld	W	D	L	GF	GA	GD	Pts	Promotion or relegation
1	Piteå IF	22	15	3	4	58	29	+29	48	Promoted
2	Sunnanå SK (Skellefteå)	22	12	6	4	49	21	+28	42	Promotion Playoffs
3	Gällivare Malmberget FF	22	12	4	6	54	24	+30	40	
4	Alviks IK (Luleå)	22	12	3	7	56	34	+22	39	
5	Sävast AIF	22	11	6	5	40	29	+11	39	
6	Hemmingsmarks IF	22	12	3	7	44	38	+6	39	
7	Notvikens IK	22	8	6	8	35	30	+5	30	
8	Morön BK	22	8	5	9	41	38	+3	29	
9	Ohtanajärvi/Aapua FF (Korpilombolo)	22	8	5	9	36	40	−4	29	Relegation Playoffs
10	Malå IF	22	8	2	12	33	46	−13	26	Relegated
11	Pol/Svanstein FF (Juoksengi)	22	2	2	18	16	63	−47	8	Relegated
12	Munksund Skuthamn SK (Piteå)	22	1	1	20	12	82	−70	4	Relegated

=== Mellersta Norrland 2007 ===
Pos	Team	Pld	W	D	L	GF	GA	GD	Pts	Promotion or relegation
1	Mariehem SK	22	13	6	3	51	23	+28	45	Promoted
2	Svartviks IF (Kvissleby)	22	11	5	6	47	37	+10	38	Promotion Playoffs
3	Frösö IF	22	10	4	8	52	31	+21	34	
4	IFK Östersund	22	9	7	6	42	31	+11	34	
5	Delsbo IF	22	10	3	9	50	33	+17	33	
6	Krokom/Dvärsätt IF	22	10	3	9	37	40	−3	33	
7	Junsele IF	22	10	2	10	38	57	−19	32	
8	Lycksele IF	22	9	2	11	35	39	−4	29	
9	Graninge FF	22	8	3	11	49	44	+5	27	Relegation Playoffs – Relegated
10	Selånger FK (Sundsvall)	22	7	4	11	28	55	−27	25	Relegated
11	Ope IF	22	7	3	12	34	49	−15	24	Relegated
12	Alnö IF	22	5	4	13	32	56	−24	19	Relegated

=== Södra Norrland 2007 ===
Pos	Team	Pld	W	D	L	GF	GA	GD	Pts	Promotion or relegation
1	Söderhamns FF	22	17	2	3	50	17	+33	53	Promoted
2	Valbo FF	22	15	1	6	48	30	+18	46	Promotion Playoffs
3	Dala-Järna IK	22	13	5	4	44	24	+20	44	
4	IK Huge (Gävle)	22	10	5	7	32	22	+10	35	
5	Ludvika FK	22	10	3	9	31	22	+9	33	
6	Gestrike-Hammarby IF	22	9	5	8	31	31	0	32	
7	Kvarnsvedens IK	22	9	3	10	28	32	−4	30	
8	Bollnäs GIF	22	8	5	9	32	31	+1	29	
9	Smedjebackens FK	22	7	5	10	39	49	−10	26	Relegation Playoffs – Relegated
10	Strands IF (Hudiksvall)	22	4	5	13	31	51	−20	17	Relegated
11	Avesta AIK	22	4	3	15	18	50	−32	15	Relegated
12	Korsnäs IF FK	22	4	2	16	16	41	−25	14	Relegated

=== Norra Svealand 2007 ===
Pos	Team	Pld	W	D	L	GF	GA	GD	Pts	Promotion or relegation
1	Råsunda IS (Solna)	22	14	7	1	54	26	+28	49	Promoted
2	Turebergs IF (Sollentuna)	22	13	3	6	51	28	+23	42	Promotion Playoffs – Promoted
3	Gamla Upsala SK	22	12	5	5	58	29	+29	41	
4	Spånga IS FK	22	10	7	5	41	27	+14	37	
5	Täby IS	22	11	3	8	50	39	+11	36	
6	FC Järfälla	22	9	6	7	38	36	+2	33	
7	Gimo IF FK	22	10	2	10	51	47	+4	32	
8	BKV Norrtälje	22	10	2	10	39	40	−1	32	
9	Ängby IF	22	10	2	10	47	54	−7	32	Relegation Playoffs
10	IFK Österåkers FK (Åkersberga)	22	5	3	14	38	50	−12	18	Relegated
11	IK Fyris (Uppsala)	22	4	3	15	18	57	−39	15	Relegated
12	Storvreta IK	22	2	1	19	26	78	−52	7	Relegated

=== Östra Svealand 2007 ===
Pos	Team	Pld	W	D	L	GF	GA	GD	Pts	Promotion or relegation
1	Panellinios IF (Nacka)	22	18	1	3	77	25	+52	55	Promoted
2	Huddinge IF	22	15	2	5	60	27	+33	47	Promotion Playoffs
3	IK Tellus (Hägersten)	22	12	4	6	49	37	+12	40	
4	Värmdö IF	22	11	1	10	47	42	+5	34	
5	Konyaspor KIF (Botkyrka)	22	10	3	9	42	32	+10	33	
6	FoC Farsta	22	9	4	9	40	35	+5	31	
7	Katrineholms SK FK	22	9	3	10	42	45	−3	30	
8	Vagnhärads SK	22	7	7	8	27	35	−8	28	
9	Kvicksunds SK	22	7	3	12	35	60	−25	24	Relegation Playoffs – Relegated
10	Boo FF (Saltsjö-Boo)	22	6	5	11	36	51	−15	23	Relegated
11	Segeltorps IF	22	4	5	13	30	61	−31	17	Relegated
12	Oxelösunds IK	22	3	4	15	38	73	−35	13	Relegated

=== Västra Svealand 2007 ===
Pos	Team	Pld	W	D	L	GF	GA	GD	Pts	Promotion or relegation
1	Karlslunds IF HFK (Örebro)	22	16	4	2	68	17	+51	52	Promoted
2	Örebro SK Ungdom	22	14	4	4	48	27	+21	46	Promotion Playoffs
3	Köping FF	22	15	0	7	64	31	+33	45	
4	FBK Karlstad	22	9	6	7	41	47	−6	33	
5	Adolfsbergs IK (Örebro)	22	9	4	9	34	30	+4	31	
6	Örebro Syrianska BK	22	10	1	11	33	32	+1	31	
7	IFK Kumla	22	9	2	11	41	51	−10	29	
8	IFK Ölme	22	7	6	9	33	41	−8	27	
9	Kungsör BK	22	8	3	11	32	48	−16	27	Relegation Playoffs – Relegated
10	Strömtorps IK	22	6	5	11	20	36	−16	23	Relegated
11	IK Franke (Västerås)	22	5	5	12	29	50	−21	20	Relegated
12	Västerås BK 30	22	3	2	17	22	55	−33	11	Relegated

=== Nordöstra Götaland 2007 ===
Pos	Team	Pld	W	D	L	GF	GA	GD	Pts	Promotion or relegation
1	Lindö FF (Norrköping)	22	13	6	3	54	23	+31	45	Promoted
2	Assyriska IF Norrköping	22	14	3	5	51	23	+28	45	Promotion Playoffs
3	Grimsås IF	22	13	6	3	50	25	+25	45	
4	Vimmerby IF	22	12	6	4	46	22	+24	42	
5	Mjölby AI FF	22	10	4	8	49	40	+9	34	
6	Gullringens GoIF	22	8	5	9	29	42	−13	29	
7	IK Östria Lambohov	22	8	4	10	40	39	+1	28	
8	Nässjö FF	22	7	7	8	44	45	−1	28	
9	Hovslätts IK	22	7	5	10	29	43	−14	26	Relegation Playoffs – Relegated
10	Ulricehamns IFK	22	4	5	13	31	49	−18	17	Relegated
11	Aneby SK	22	5	2	15	31	64	−33	17	Relegated
12	Hultsfreds FK	22	2	5	15	20	59	−39	11	Relegated

=== Nordvästra Götaland 2007 ===
Pos	Team	Pld	W	D	L	GF	GA	GD	Pts	Promotion or relegation
1	Utsiktens BK (Västra Frölunda)	22	17	3	2	47	18	+29	54	Promoted
2	Sävedalens IF	22	13	4	5	52	30	+22	43	Promotion Playoffs
3	Finlandia-Pallo IF (Göteborg)	22	13	3	6	42	33	+9	42	
4	Ytterby IS	22	12	4	6	64	34	+30	40	
5	Stenungsunds IF	22	10	3	9	39	34	+5	33	
6	IF Väster (Västra Frölunda)	22	10	1	11	38	45	−7	31	
7	Slottsskogen/Godhem IF (Göteborg)	22	9	2	11	39	41	−2	29	
8	IK Kongahälla (Kungälv)	22	9	2	11	26	30	−4	29	
9	Åsebro IF	22	6	5	11	39	44	−5	23	Relegation Playoffs
10	Kållereds SK	22	6	4	12	38	57	−19	22	Relegated
11	Romelanda UF	22	5	2	15	27	60	−33	17	Relegated
12	Kungshamns IF	22	3	5	14	36	61	−25	14	Relegated

=== Mellersta Götaland 2007 ===
Pos	Team	Pld	W	D	L	GF	GA	GD	Pts	Promotion or relegation
1	Annelunds IF	22	13	7	2	57	28	+29	46	Promoted
2	Holmalunds IF (Alingsås)	22	12	3	7	55	33	+22	39	Promotion Playoffs
3	IFK Mariestad	22	12	3	7	40	39	+1	39	
4	IFK Falköping FF	22	9	6	7	31	26	+5	33	
5	Mariedals IK (Borås)	22	9	5	8	46	48	−2	32	
6	IK Gauthiod (Grästorp)	22	8	6	8	44	36	+8	30	
7	Skara FC	22	8	5	9	43	41	+2	29	
8	Gerdskens BK (Alingsås)	22	6	9	7	31	38	−7	27	
9	Alingsås IF	22	6	9	7	29	36	−7	27	Relegation Playoffs – Relegated
10	IFK Trollhättan	22	6	6	10	38	49	−11	24	Relegated
11	Götene IF	22	4	8	10	27	42	−15	20	Relegated
12	Floda BoIF	22	3	5	14	36	61	−25	14	Relegated

=== Sydöstra Götaland 2007 ===
Pos	Team	Pld	W	D	L	GF	GA	GD	Pts	Promotion or relegation
1	Nybro IF	22	13	4	5	47	24	+23	43	Promoted
2	Älmhults IF	22	12	6	4	49	25	+24	42	Promotion Playoffs
3	Nosaby IF	22	12	5	5	36	20	+16	41	
4	IFÖ Bromölla IF	22	10	9	3	49	37	+12	39	
5	Rydaholms GoIF	22	10	6	6	46	34	+12	36	
6	VMA IK (Villanda Vånga)	22	8	8	6	41	36	+5	32	
7	Växjö Norra IF	22	7	6	9	41	40	+1	27	
8	Saxemara IF	22	8	3	11	38	50	−12	27	
9	Kalmar AIK FK	22	5	8	9	38	47	−9	23	Relegation Playoffs
10	Hovmantorp GoIF	22	6	3	13	23	36	−13	21	Relegated
11	Jämjö GoIF	22	5	6	11	24	43	−19	21	Relegated
12	Färjestadens GoIF	22	2	4	16	19	59	−40	10	Relegated

=== Sydvästra Götaland 2007 ===
Pos	Team	Pld	W	D	L	GF	GA	GD	Pts	Promotion or relegation
1	Markaryds IF	22	16	3	3	62	23	+39	51	Promoted
2	IFK Fjärås	22	13	4	5	54	33	+21	43	Promotion Playoffs
3	IS Halmia (Halmstad)	22	13	3	6	51	26	+25	42	
4	Åstorps FF	22	10	6	6	45	38	+7	36	
5	Hinneryds IF	22	10	3	9	47	44	+3	33	
6	Tvååkers IF	22	10	3	9	42	43	−1	33	
7	Höganäs BK	22	9	3	10	38	50	−12	30	
8	Gantofta IF	22	8	3	11	39	42	−3	27	
9	Snöstorp Nyhem FF	22	7	5	10	40	49	−9	26	Relegation Playoffs – Relegated
10	Påarps GIF	22	7	1	14	35	61	−26	22	Relegated
11	Sennans IF (Åled)	22	4	5	13	25	47	−22	17	Relegated
12	IF Leikin (Halmstad)	22	4	3	15	26	48	−22	15	Relegated

=== Södra Götaland 2007 ===
Pos	Team	Pld	W	D	L	GF	GA	GD	Pts	Promotion or relegation
1	Asmundtorps IF	22	12	4	6	52	27	+25	40	Promoted
2	IFK Klagshamn	22	12	4	6	44	22	+22	40	Promotion Playoffs – Promoted
3	Eslövs BK	22	12	4	6	52	36	+16	40	
4	Limhamns IF	22	11	5	6	54	38	+16	38	
5	Veberöds AIF	22	11	4	7	49	39	+10	37	
6	Tomelilla IF	22	11	4	7	42	39	+3	37	
7	Sjöbo IF	22	9	3	10	36	40	−4	30	
8	Stavsten/Ymor FK (Trelleborg)	22	7	7	8	45	41	+4	28	
9	Ystads IF FF	22	7	4	11	34	43	−9	25	Relegation Playoffs – Relegated
10	Kulladals FF	22	6	5	11	26	45	−19	23	Relegated
11	Höörs IS	22	5	2	15	36	70	−34	17	Relegated
12	FBK Balkan (Malmö)	22	4	4	14	39	69	−30	16	Relegated
