= Division 5 (Swedish women's football) =

Women's association football league in Sweden

Division 5 (Swedish: Division 5 i fotboll för damer) is the seventh level in the league system of Swedish women's football and comprises 43 sections with 5-12 football teams in each.

== Current sections - 2019 season ==
Alingsås - Västergötland

Alingsås KIK | DIK Frisco | Elmer-Fåglums FK/Nossebro IF | Göta BK | Hemsjö IF | Hudene GoIF | Lilla Edets IF | Långared BoIS | Skoftebyns DIF | Södra Härene IF | Trollhättans BoIS | Åsaka SK

Ångermanland

Bjärtrå IS | Långsele AIF lag 2 | MG-83 lag2 | Tresjö/Gideå | Ådalslidens SK

Blekinge

FFT | BK Glasbacken | Hasslö GoIF | Hörvikens IF | Listerby/BHIF | Nopelns IF | Ramdala FF | Sölvesborgs GIF

Bohuslän

Bullaren/Tanum | Lysekils FF | Sotenäs DFF/Hamburgsunds ID | Stenungsunds IF | IFK Strömstad | Tjörn DFF

Borås - Västergötland

Bergdalen UIK | Borgstena IF | Borås AIK | Brämhults IK | Hössna IF | FC Kabel Åttio | Länghems IF | Sandareds IF/Sjömarkens IF | Sexdrega/Aplareds IF | Södra Vings IF | Töllsjö IF | Örby FC

Dalarna norra

Dala-Järna IK U | Dalkurd FF | IFK Mora FK U | IFK Våmhus | IF Nornan | Mockfjärds BK | Vansbro AIK FK U | Vikarby IK | Älvdalens IF FK

Dalarna södra

Bjursås IK | IF Tunabro | Nyhammars IF | Ornäs BK | Skogsbo/Avesta IF | Stora Skedvi IK FF | Sundborns GOIF | Svärdsjö IF | Söderbärke GOIF | Östansbo IS U

Dalsland

Brålanda/Åsebro | Bäckefors IF | Eds FF | Frändefors IF Lag 2 | H.E.F. Valbo BK lag 2 | IF Viken lag 2 | Kroppefjälls IF lag 2 | Laxarby IF

Emmaboda - Småland

Bodabruk GoIF B (9-m) | Bäckebo GoIF | Emmaboda IS C | Hovmantorps GoIF | Ingelstads IK B | Madesjö IF C | Nöbbele BK (9-m) | Tingsryd United FC B | Åryds IK

Falköping - Västergötland

Ardala GoIF | Falköping United FC | Floby IF | IFK Hjo | Lundsbrunns IF | Skara KIK | Skarke KIK Varnhem | Valtorps IF | Vartofta SK | Vretens BK

Gästrikland

Not yet available

Göteborg

Balltorps FF | BK Häcken DF | BK Wobbler | Guldhedens IK | Hermansby IF | Hjuviks AIK/IK Zenith | Kållereds SK | Mossens FC | Näsets IK | Rannebergens IF | Sandarna BK | SK Argo | Tuve IF | Romelanda UF (withdrew) | Älvsborg FF (withdrew)

Halland mellersta

DFK Hasko | IF Böljan 3 | Kvibille/Getinge | Slöinge GOIF /Skrea | SRG Himledalen | Vessigebro/Ginsten | Vinbergs IF | Våxtorps BOIS | Ätrans FF

Halland norra

SRG Himledalen 2 | Lerkils IF 2 | Lilla Träslövs FF | Tofta GIF 2 | Tvååker/Galtabäck 2 | Ullareds IK 2 | Valinge IF 2 | Varbergs BoIS FC 2 | Åsa IF 2

Halland södra

Alets IK | DFK Hasko 2 | Knäred/ Skogaby | Kornhult/Hishult FF 2 | Simlångsdalens IF | Snöstorp Nyhem FF 2 | Trönninge IF 2 | VGLT | WRY | Våxtorp BoIS 2

Hultsfred - Småland

HIS/MAIS | Högsby IK | Kristinebergs FF B (9-m) | Krokstorps IF B | Långemåla IF | Oskarshamns UBK | Rödsle BK U | SVIF/Rumskulla | Tjust IF FF B (9-m)

Jönköping - Småland

Bankeryds SK B | Barnarps IF | Ekhagens IF | IF Hallby FK | Mariebo IK U | Råslätt SK | Tabergs SK | Torpa FF | IK Vista

Kalmar/Öland - Småland

IFK Borgholm B | Färjestadens GoIF B | Hossmo BK | Kalmar Södra IF B | Mörbylånga GoIF | Norra Tångs BK B | Runsten/Möckle IF B | Smedby BoIK B | Team Södermöre B | Trekantens IF

Lidköping - Västergötland

Arentorp/Helås | Edsvära/Norra Vånga FF | IFK Emtunga | Järpås IS | Kållandsö GoIF | Levene/Skogslunds IF | Rackeby KIK | Råda DBK | Saleby IF | Vinninga AIF | Örslösa/Söne

Ljungby - Småland

Angelstads IF | Delary/ Hamneda | Hinneryds IF | Hjortsberga IF | Lagans AIK | Ljungby IF C | Moheda IF B | Rydaholms GoIF | Råstorp/Timsfors IF

Mariestad - Västergötland

Björsäters IF | BK Trix | Fagersanna/ Mölltorp-Brevik | Gullspång/ Hova/ Weimer Lyrestad | Hörnebo FC | Igelstorps IK | Jula BK | Moholm/ Tidan | Tidavads IF | Tymer/Lerdala

Nässjö - Småland

Aneby SK B | Bodafors SK Dam B (9-m) | Forserums IF | Fredriksdal/Äng (9-m) | IF Eksjö Fotboll B (9-m) | IFK Hult (9-m) | Nässjö FF B | Sommens AIF (9-m) | Tabergs SK B | Torpa AIS Dam U (9-m)

Östergötland östra

Dagsbergs IF | Gusums IF Valdemarsvik | Hagahöjdens BK | Igelfors IF | Linghems SK B | Norrköping City DFF B | Ringarums IF | Skärblacka IF | Söderköpings IK | Åby IF

Östergötland västra

AC Studenterna | Borens IK B | LiU AIF FK | LSW IF B | Malmslätts AIK | Motala AIF FK | Rimforsa IF B | Skeninge IK | Tallboda IF | Västra Harg IF | Åtvidabergs FF

Skåne mellersta

BW 90 IF/Önneköps IF | FC Bjerred | Genarp/Dalby | GIF Nike | Lunds BoIS | Staffanstorps GIF | Torns IF | Veberöds AIF | Vollsjö AIF

Skåne nordöstra

Degeberga GoIF | DFF Kristianstadstjejerna | Edenryds IF | Gärds Köpinge IF | Hanaskog/Bjärlöv | Nävlinge IF/Vinslövs IF | Tollarps IF | Vanneberga IF

Skåne nordvästra

Bjärelaget/Hjärnarp | Hasslarps BK | Hovs GoIF | Häljarps IF | IF Lödde | IF Salamis | IK Bergandy | Kvidinge IF | Strövelstorps GIF | Teckomatorps SK

Skåne norra

Ekets GoIF | Farstorps GIF | Hästveda IF | Klippans FF | Röstånga IS | Tjörnarps BoIF | Treby IF | Tyringe IF | Vankiva IF | Vedby/Rönne

Skåne sydöstra

Blentarps BK | Brösarps IF | Gislövsdals IK | IK Pandora | Lunnarps BK | Sankt Olofs IF/ Kiviks AIF | SoGK Charlo/Rynge | Spjutstorps IF | Svenstorps IF | Sövestads IF

Skåne sydvästra

AIF Barrikaden | FC Rosengård | FC Trelleborg | Gislövs IF | Heleneholms SK | IFK Klagshamn | Skabersjö IF | Svedala IF | Åkarps IF

Södermanland norra

Dunkers IF | Ea United DFF 2 | FF Södertälje | IF Verdandi | Kvicksunds SK | Skogstorps GoIF | Stora Sundby GoIF | Torshargs BK | Triangelns IK 3 | Åkers IF 2

Södermanland södra

Flens IF-Södra 2 | Hargs BK 2 | Katrineholms AIK | IFK Nyköping 3 | Oxelösunds IK 2 | Stigtomta IF | Trosa IF / Vagnhärads SK | Valla IF | Vingåkers IF

Stockholm A

Danderyds SK | Edsvikens FK | Enebybergs IF | IFK Vaxholm | Järfälla FF | Rissne IF | Spånga IS FK | Sundbybergs IK | Turebergs IF

Stockholm B

BK Sol | BK Träsket | FK Bromma | Hanvikens SK | Ingarö IF | Järla IF FK | Mariebergs SK | Nacka Allstars DFF | Värmdö IF | Ängby IF

Stockholm C

Bagarmossen Kärrtorp BK | FC Bajen Dam | Grödinge SK | Långholmen FC | Rågsveds IF DFF | Skogås/Trångsunds FF | Tungelsta IF | Vendelsö FF | Västertorps BK | Örby IS

Uppland norra

Films SK/IFK D-Ö | Karlholms GoIF | Månkarbo IF | Upsala IF | Väddö IF | Österlövsta FF | Östhammar SK

Uppland södra

Bro IK | Bålsta FF | Funbo IF | Knarrbacken FC | Rådmansö SK | Rö IK | Vaksala FF | Vallentuna DFF

Uppland västra

Fjärdhundra SK | Hagby IK | Harbo IF | Heby AIF | SK Iron | IK Nordia | Tärnsjö IF | Åsunda IF

Värmland östra

IFK Munkfors | IFK Skoghall 2 | IFK Väse | Karlskoga SK | IFK Kristinehamn | Lesjöfors IF | Persbergs SK | Skattkärrs IF 2 | Slottsbrons IF | Östra Deje IK

Värmland västra

HÄJ | Högboda IF | IS Emtarna | Kila/Sifhälla 2 | Klässbols SK | Kronans DFK | Köla/Koppom | Lysviks IF | Rännbergs IK | Torsby IF 2 | Töcksfors IF

Värnamo - Småland

Anderstorps IF | Bors SK B (9-m) | Burseryds IF | Gislaveds IS B | Gnosjö Spirit FC B | Hillerstorp/Kulltorp | Hångers IF (9-m) | Smålandsstenars GOIF B (9-m) | Waggeryds IK B | Vrigstads IF

Västmanland

Arboga Södra IF U1 | Barkarö SK | Irsta IF | Norrby SK U1 | Romfartuna GIF | Rytterne IS U1 | Sala FF U1 | Skultuna IS | Syrianska IF Kerburan

Växjö - Småland

Holsby SK | Hovshaga AIF B | Hultsjö IF Atom | IFK Lammhult (9-m) | Lenhovda IF | Sandsbro Allmänna IK | Vederslöv/Dänningelanda IF | Växjö FF C | Åby/Tjureda Dam | Åseda IF B (9-m)
