= Oskar Sverrisson =

Swedish footballer

Óskar Sverrisson
Personal information
- Full name: Óskar Tor Sverrisson
- Date of birth: 26 November 1992 (age 33)
- Place of birth: Hörby, Sweden
- Height: 1.84 m (6 ft 0 in)
- Position: Left-back

Team information
- Current team: Trelleborgs FF
- Number: 3

Youth career
- Hörby FF
- Höörs IS

Senior career*
Years	Team	Apps	(Gls)
2010–2011	Höörs IS	38	(1)
2012–2015	Lunds BK	64	(4)
2015	Dalkurd FF	4	(0)
2016	Landskrona BoIS	25	(0)
2017–2018	Mjällby AIF	55	(15)
2019–2021	BK Häcken	29	(0)
2022–2024	Varberg	57	(0)
2025	Ariana FC	26	(3)
2026–	Trelleborgs FF	30	(4)

International career
2020–	Iceland	1	(0)
- * Club domestic league appearances and goals as of 16 November 2026

Óskar Tor Sverrisson (born 26 November 1992) is a footballer who plays for Trelleborgs FF. Born in Sweden, Sverrison represents the Iceland national football team.

== Club career ==
On 9 December 2021, Sverrisson signed a three-year deal with Varberg. He lef the club at the end of 2024.

In January 2025, Sverisson joined Ettan Fotboll side Ariana FC.

== International career ==
Sverisson was born in Sweden, and is of Icelandic descent through his father. Sverrisson received a call-up to the Icelandic national team in January 2020. He made his international debut for Iceland on 19 January 2020 in a friendly match against El Salvador, which finished as a 1–0 win.

== Career statistics ==
As of match played 15 November 2026

Appearances and goals by club, season and competition
Club	Season	League			National cup (Note: Includes Svenska Cupen, Norwegian Cup)		Continental		Other		Total	
Club	Season	Division	Apps	Goals	Apps	Goals	Apps	Goals	Goals	Apps	Goals	Apps
Lund	2012	Ettan	23	2	0	0	—		2 (Note: Appearance(s) in Superettan promotion/relegation play-offs)	0	25	2
Lund	2013	Ettan	20	0	2	0	—		—		22	0
Lund	2014	Ettan	21	2	0	0	—		—		21	2
Lund	Total		64	4	2	0	—		2	0	68	4
Kvik Halden	2015	Norwegian Second Division	0	0	2	0	—		—		2	0
Dalkurd FF	2015	Ettan	4	0	0	0	—		—		4	0
Landskrona BoIS	2016	Ettan	25	0	2	0	—		—		27	0
Mjällby AIF	2017	Ettan	26	6	0	0	—		2	0	28	6
Mjällby AIF	2018	Ettan	29	9	0	0	—		—		29	9
Mjällby AIF	Total		55	15	0	0	—		2	0	57	15
BK Häcken	2019	Allsvenskan	6	0	2	0	2 (Note: Appearance(s) in UEFA Europa League)	0	—		10	0
BK Häcken	2020	Allsvenskan	7	0	2	0	—		—		9	0
BK Häcken	2021	Allsvenskan	16	0	6	0	2 (Note: Appearance(s) in UEFA Europa Conference League)	0	—		24	0
BK Häcken	Total		29	0	10	0	4	0	—		43	0
Varberg	2022	Allsvenskan	12	0	2	0	—		0	0	14	0
Varberg	2023	Allsvenskan	22	0	1	0	—		—		23	0
Varberg	2024	Superettan	23	0	3	0	—		—		26	0
Varberg	Total		57	0	6	0	—		0	0	63	0
Ariana FC	2025	Ettan	26	3	0	0	—		0	0	26	3
Trelleborg	2026	Ettan	30	4	3	0	—		0	0	33	4
Career total			290	26	25	0	4	0	4	0	323	26
