= Scania Football Association =

Association football district association in Sweden

Skånes Fotbollförbund
- Sport: Football
- Jurisdiction: Scania
- Abbreviation: Skånes FF
- Founded: 23 March 1919
- Affiliation: Swedish Football Association
- Headquarters: Husie Kyrkoväg 88
- Location: Box 1046; 21210 Malmö; Skåne County; Sweden

Official website
- www.skaneboll.se

The Skånes Fotbollförbund (Scania Football Association) is one of the 24 district organisations of the Swedish Football Association. It administers lower tier football in the non-administrative province of Scania.

== Background ==
Skånes Fotbollförbund, commonly referred to as Skånes FF, is the governing body for football in the historical province of Scania, the corresponding area being Skåne County. The Association was founded on 23 March 1919 and currently has 376 member clubs. Skånes FF is based in Malmö.

== Affiliated Members ==
The following clubs are affiliated to the Skånes FF (2017):

- AC Kvarnby
- Afro FK
- AIF Barrikaden
- Allerums GIF
- Anderslövs BoIK
- Ariana FC
- Arlövs BI
- Askeröds IF
- Asmundtorps IF
- Athletic Club
- Backarnas FF
- Ballingslöv GoIF
- Bara GoIF
- Baskemölla IF
- Båstads GoIF
- Billeberga GIF
- Billesholms GIF
- Billesholms IK
- Bjärelaget DFF
- Bjärlövs IF
- Bjärnums GoIF
- Bjärreds IF
- Bjuvstorps FF
- BK Flagg
- BK Fram
- BK Höllviken
- BK Kick
- BK Landora
- BK Näset
- BK Olympic
- BK Skansen
- BK Vången
- Blentarps BK
- Borgeby FK
- Borrby IF
- Borstahusens BK
- Bosna FF
- Bosnien Hercegovinas SK
- Bosniska FK Behar
- Branteviks IF
- Broby IF
- Brösarps IF
- Brunnby FF
- Bunkeflo FF
- BW 90 IF
- Croatia Helsingborg KIF
- Dalby GIF
- Degeberga GoIF
- DFK Borgeby 09
- Djurröds IK
- Dösjöbro IF
- Edenryds IF
- Ekeby GIF
- Ekets GoIF
- Engelholms BK
- Eskilsminne DFF
- Eskilsminne IF
- Eslövs BK
- Esperöds SK
- Everöds IF
- Färingtofta IK
- Farstorps GoIF
- FBK Balkan
- FC Bellevue
- FC Canarias
- FC Drottninghög
- FC Dösjöbro
- FC Helsingkrona
- FC Hessleholm
- FC Kopparmöllan
- FC Krubban
- FC Malmö United
- FC Möjligheten
- FC Möllan
- FC New Life
- FC Näset
- FC Örkelljunga
- FC Österlen
- FC Plisat
- FC Rosengård
- FC Rosengård 1917
- FC Staffanstorp
- FC Trelleborg
- FC Törnrosen
- FC Västra Hamnen
- FF Vuk
- Finja IF
- Fjälkinge IF
- FK Besa
- FK Bosna
- Förslövs IF
- Fortuna FF
- Furulunds IK
- Futsal Club Ängelholm
- Gantofta IF
- Gärds Köpinge IF
- Gärsnäs AIS
- Genarps IF
- GIF Nike
- Gislövs IF
- Glemmingebro IF
- Glimåkra IF
- Glumslövs FF
- GOF IF
- Grevie GIK
- Gröstorps IF
- Gualövs GOIF
- Gunnarstorps IF
- Gylle AIF
- Gyllebo IF
- Håkanstorps BK
- Häljarps IF
- Hallands Nations FF
- Hammenhögs IF
- Hanaskogs IS
- Hardeberga BK
- Harlösa IF
- Harrie FF
- Härslövs IK
- Hasslarps BK
- Hässleholm Freeflow FC
- Hässleholms IF
- Hästveda IF
- Heleneholms SK
- Helsingborg City FC
- Helsingborg SC
- Helsingborg Östra IF
- Helsingborgs AIS
- Helsingborgs FF
- Helsingborgs IF
- Helsingborgs IF Akademi
- HF Olympia
- Hittarps IK
- Hjärnarps GIF
- Hjärsås/Värestorps IF
- Högaborgs BK
- Höganäs BK
- Höllvikens DFF
- Holma-Kroksbäck IF
- Holmeja IS
- Höörs IS
- Höörs United FF
- Hörby FF
- Hörja IF
- Hovs GoIF
- Huaröds IF
- Hurva IF
- Husie IF
- Hyllie IK
- Hyllinge GIF
- IF Ale
- IF Alexander den Store
- IF Limhamn Bunkeflo
- IF Lödde
- IF Salamis
- IFK Hässleholm
- IFK Höganäs
- IFK Klagshamn
- IFK Knislinge
- IFK Malmö FK
- IFK Osby
- IFK Rössjöholm
- IFK Simrishamn
- IFK Trelleborg
- IFK Ystad FK
- Ifö Bromölla IF
- IK Bergandy
- IK Kamp
- IK Pandora FF
- IK Wormo
- Ingelstorps IF
- Iranska FF
- Ivö BK
- Jägersborgs IF
- Janstorps AIF
- Järrestad FF
- Jonstorps IF FK
- Kågeröds BoIF
- Kävlinge GoIF
- Kiaby IF
- Kiviks AIF
- Klågerups GoIF
- Klagstorps IF
- Klippans Förenade FF
- Köpingebro IF
- Korpen Malmö IF
- Kristianstad FC
- Kristianstads DFF
- Kristianstads FF
- Kronan FC
- Kropps GoIF
- KSF Kosova
- KSF Makedonija
- KSF Prespa Birlik
- KSF Srbija Malmö
- Kullabygdens DFF
- Kulladals FF
- Kullavägens BK
- Kungshults IK
- Kurdiska IF Malmö
- Kvarnby IK
- Kvidinge IF
- Landskrona BoIS
- Liga 06 IF
- Lilla Beddinge BK
- Lilla Torg FF
- Limhamns FF
- Limhamns FF 1948
- Linderöds IF
- Linero IF
- Liria IF
- Listorps IF
- Ljungbyheds IF
- Löberöds IF
- Löderups IF
- Lönsboda GoIF
- Lomma FF
- Lövestads IF
- Lunds BK
- Lunds BOIS
- Lunds FF
- Lunds SK
- Lunnarps BK
- Maglasäte IF
- Makedoniska IF
- Mala IF
- Malmö Boys IF
- Malmö City FC
- Malmö FF
- Malmö Futsal Club
- Malmö FVC
- Malmö IKF
- Marieholms IS
- MF Pelister
- Minnesbergs IF
- MKSF Pelagonija
- Mörarps IF
- Munka Ljungby IF
- Näsby IF
- Näsets FF
- Näsums IF
- Nävlinge IF
- NK Croatia
- Norra Rörums GIF
- Nosaby IF
- Onslunda IF
- Orient FC
- Ovesholms IF
- Oxie SK
- Perstorp Bälinge IK
- Råå DIF
- Råå IF
- Ramlösa Södra IF
- Röke IF
- Romele FC
- Rörsjöstadens IF
- Rörums SK
- Rosengårds FF
- Röstånga IS
- Rydsgårds AIF
- Rynge IK
- Sambafotbollsskolan FF
- Sankt Olofs IF
- Seveds FK
- Sibbhults IF
- Sjöbo FF
- Sjöbo IF
- SK Hakoah
- Skabersjö DFF
- Skabersjö IF
- Skäldervikens IF
- Skånekurd FF
- Skånes Fagerhults IF
- Skanör Falsterbo IF
- Skegrie BK
- Skepparslövs IF
- Skillinge IF
- Skivarps GoIF
- Skurups AIF
- Skurups DFF
- Smedstorps IF
- Snogeröds IF
- Södra Rörums Bygdeförening
- Södra Sandby IF
- SoGK Charlo
- Spanska Akademin FF
- Sösdala IF
- Sövde IF
- Sövestads IF
- Spjutstorps IF
- Staffanstorp United FC
- Staffanstorp United FC Ungdom
- Stattena IF
- Stehags AIF
- Stockamöllans IF
- Stora Harrie IF
- Strömsborgs IF
- Strövelstorps GoIF
- Svalöv United FC
- Svalövs BK
- Svedala IF
- Svedbergs GoIF
- Svensköps IF
- Svenstorps IF
- Tågarps AIK
- Team Sandby IF
- Teckomatorps SK
- Teknologkårens IF LTH
- TFK Nova Eslöv
- Tjörnarps BoIF
- Tollarps IF
- Tomelilla IF
- Torekovs IK
- Torna Hällestads IF
- Torns IF
- Tosteberga/Nymölla IF
- Treby IF
- Trelleborg United FF
- Trelleborgs FF
- Trollenäs IF
- Turkisk Center FF
- Tygelsjö BK
- Tygelsjö Västra Klagstorps IF
- Tyringe IF
- Ungdoms Respekt FF
- Uppåkra IF
- Vallåkra IF
- Vankiva IF
- Vanneberga FF
- Vanneberga IF
- Vanstads IF
- Väsby FK
- Västra Ingelstad IS
- Västra Karups IF
- Veberöds AIF
- Vedby/Rönne IF
- Vegeholms IF
- Vejby IF
- Vellinge FF
- Vellinge IF
- Venestad IF
- Verums GoIF
- Viby IF
- Vikens IK
- Vinnö IF
- Vinslövs IF
- Vittsjö DFK
- Vittsjö GIK
- Vittskövle IF
- VMA IK
- Wästra Allmänna FF
- Wisseltofta IF
- Wollsjö AIF
- Yngsjö IF
- Ystads IF FF
- Åhus Horna BK
- Åhus IF
- Åhus Sports Club
- Åkarps IF
- Åstorps FF
- Åsums BK
- Ängelholms FF
- Ödåkra IF
- Öja FF
- Önneköps IF
- Önnestad BoIF
- Örtofta IS
- Össjö IS
- Östanå Bruks IF
- Österlen FF
- Österslövs IS
- Östra Ljungby IF
- Östra Sönnarslövs IF
- Östra-Torp Smygehuk FF

== League Competitions ==
Skånes FF run the following League Competitions:

=== Men's Football ===
Division 4 - three sections
Division 5 - six sections
Division 6 - eight sections
Division 7 - six sections

=== Women's Football ===
Division 3 - two sections
Division 4 - four sections
Division 5 - six sections
