= Mikael Roth =

Swedish footballer

Personal information
- Date of birth: 8 July 1976 (age 50)
- Position: Defender

Team information
- Current team: Höörs IS

Senior career*
Years	Team	Apps	(Gls)
- IS Halmia
1998–2002	Malmö FF	102	(0)
2003–2009	IFK Norrköping	173	(11)
2010–2011	FC Rosengård	39	(0)
2012	Höörs IS		
- * Club domestic league appearances and goals

Mikael Roth (born 8 July 1976) is a Swedish footballer who plays as a defender.

Coming from IS Halmia, Roth was Halmia's largest sale in over two decades, until Mjällby AIF bought Noel Törnqvist in late 2019.
