= Marcus Lindberg =

Swedish footballer

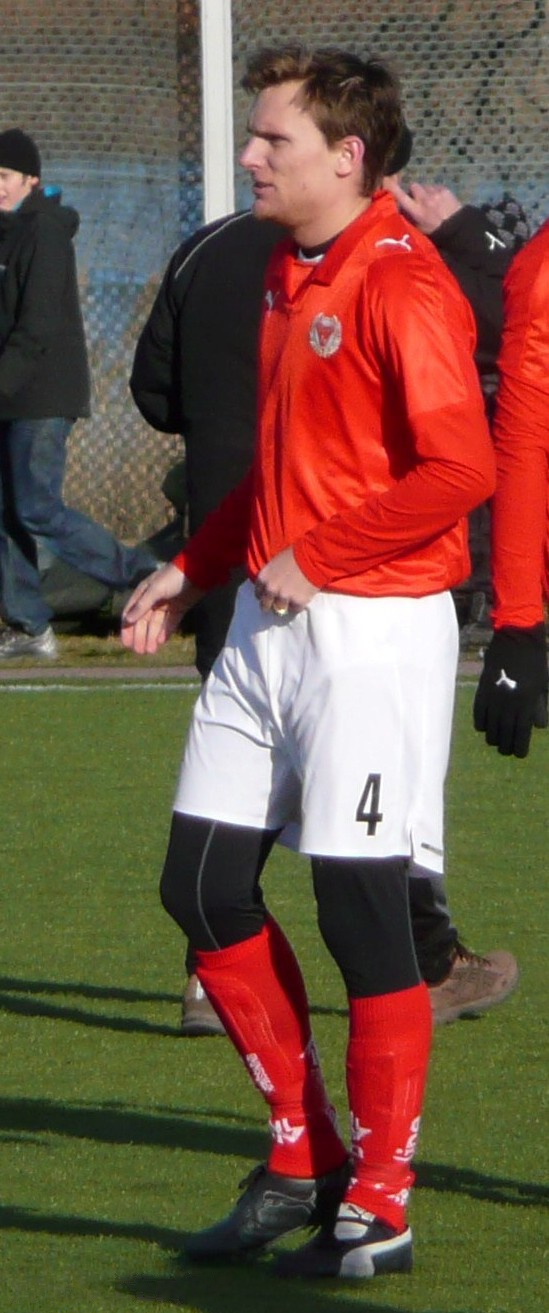

Personal information
- Full name: Jan Marcus Lindberg
- Date of birth: 31 August 1980 (age 46)
- Place of birth: Kågeröd, Svalöv, Sweden
- Height: 1.87 m (6 ft 2 in)
- Position: Centre back

Youth career
- –1994: Kågeröds BIF
- 1995–1998: Helsingborgs IF

Senior career*
Years	Team	Apps	(Gls)
1999–2004	Helsingborgs IF	32	(0)
2005–2007	Mjällby AIF	86	(4)
2008–2010	Kalmar FF	42	(2)
2011–2012	Ängelholms FF	44	(2)
2013–2014	Åstorps FF		

International career
2001–2009	Sweden	3	(0)

Managerial career
- 2013–2014: Åstorps FF (player-manager)
- * Club domestic league appearances and goals

Jan Marcus Lindberg (born 31 August 1980) is a Swedish former professional footballer. He won tree caps for the Sweden national team between 2001 and 2009.

== Coaching career ==
After retiring, it was announced in October 2012, that Lindberg would become playing manager of Swedish fourth division club Åstorps FF from 2013.
