= Sergei Prigoda =

Russian footballer

Personal information
- Full name: Sergei Grigoryevich Prigoda
- Date of birth: 4 November 1957
- Place of birth: Moscow, Soviet Union
- Date of death: 9 October 2017 (aged 59)
- Place of death: Växjö, Sweden
- Height: 1.82 m (6 ft 0 in)
- Position: Defender

Youth career
- Podshipnik Moscow

Senior career*
Years	Team	Apps	(Gls)
1975–1988	Torpedo Moscow	325	(4)
1989–1990	Östers IF	35	(3)
1991	Västerviks FF		
Total		360	(7)

International career
1977–1979	USSR	19	(0)

Managerial career
- 1997–1998: Mjällby AIF
- 2000–2002: IK Brage
- 2006–2012: Moheda IF
- 2013–2014: FC Växjö
- 2015–2017: KSF Prespa Birlik
- * Club domestic league appearances and goals

Sergei Grigoryevich Prigoda (Russian: Серге́й Григорьевич Пригода; 4 November 1957 – 9 October 2017) was a Soviet football player and Russian coach.

He coached Mjällby AIF and IK Brage.

He died on 9 October 2017.

== Honours ==
- Soviet Top League winner: 1976 (autumn).
- Soviet Top League bronze: 1977, 1988.
- Soviet Cup winner: 1986.
- Soviet Cup finalist: 1982, 1988, 1989.

== International career ==
Prigoda made his debut for USSR on 28 July 1977 in a friendly against East Germany. He played in UEFA Euro 1980 qualifiers (USSR did not qualify for the final tournament).
