= GIF Nike =

Swedish football club

- Full name: Gymnastik-och Idrottsföreningen Nike
- Founded: 1919
- Ground: Lomma IP; Lomma; Sweden
- Capacity: 6,500
- Chairman: Lars Sätmark
- Head coach: Peter Olsson
- Coach: David Brandberg; Thomas "Junior" Andersson
- League: Division 2 Västra Götaland
- 2014: Division 2 Västra Götaland, 12th
Home colours	Away colours

GIF Nike is a Swedish football club located in Lomma in Skåne.

== Background ==
The club was formed in May 1919 and its first chairman was named Tage de la Motte. The current chairman is Lars Sätmark.

Since their foundation GIF Nike has participated mainly in the middle and lower divisions of the Swedish football league system. During two seasons, 1965 and 1966, Nike played in Division 2 which at that time was the second tier of Swedish football. The club's attendance record was set for a derby match against IFK Malmö in June 1965 with 6,426 spectators at Lomma IP. Nike won the match 1–0.

In 2007 GIF Nike played in Division 2 after winning in Division 3 in 2006. GIF Nike is not just a football club as floorball is also prominent. In the summer of 2006 the badminton section was disbanded. GIF Nike's colours were established as red after the team in the 1970s voted for this. The inspiration is said to have come from Liverpool.

The club currently (2014) plays in Division 2 Västra Götaland which is the fourth tier of Swedish football. They play their home matches at the Lomma IP.

In 2009 and 2010 GIF Nike finished in tenth position in Division 2 Södra Götaland and faced the relegation playoffs. On each occasion they were successful beating FC Trelleborg in 2009 and Höörs IS in 2010.

GIF Nike are affiliated to the Skånes Fotbollförbund.

== Season to season ==
Season	Level	Division	Section	Position	Movements
1993	Tier 5	Division 4	Skåne Sydvästra	4th	
1994	Tier 5	Division 4	Skåne Sydvästra	4th	
1995	Tier 5	Division 4	Skåne Sydvästra	6th	
1996	Tier 5	Division 4	Skåne Sydvästra	2nd	Promoted
1997	Tier 4	Division 3	Södra Götaland	8th	
1998	Tier 4	Division 3	Södra Götaland	12th	Relegated
1999	Tier 5	Division 4	Skåne Västra	10th	Relegation Playoffs
2000	Tier 5	Division 4	Skåne Västra	5th	
2001	Tier 5	Division 4	Skåne Nordvästra	2nd	Promotion Playoffs – Promoted
2002	Tier 4	Division 3	Södra Götaland	3rd	
2003	Tier 4	Division 3	Södra Götaland	7th	
2004	Tier 4	Division 3	Södra Götaland	4th	
2005	Tier 4	Division 3	Södra Götaland	5th	
2006*	Tier 5	Division 3	Södra Götaland	1st	Promoted
2007	Tier 4	Division 2	Södra Götaland	10th	Relegation Playoffs
2008	Tier 4	Division 2	Södra Götaland	6th	
2009	Tier 4	Division 2	Södra Götaland	10th	Relegation Playoffs
2010	Tier 4	Division 2	Södra Götaland	10th	Relegation Playoffs
2011	Tier 4	Division 2	Södra Götaland	10th	Relegation Playoffs
2012	Tier 4	Division 2	Södra Götaland	7th	
2013	Tier 4	Division 2	Södra Götaland	9th	
2014	Tier 4	Division 2	Västra Götaland	12th	Relegation Playoffs - Relegated

* League restructuring in 2006 resulted in a new division being created at Tier 3 and subsequent divisions dropping a level.

== Attendances ==
In recent seasons GIF Nike have had the following average attendances:

Season	Average attendance	Division / Section	Level
2005	263	Div 3 Södra Götaland	Tier 4
2006	165	Div 3 Södra Götaland	Tier 5
2007	177	Div 2 Södra Götaland	Tier 4
2008	182	Div 2 Södra Götaland	Tier 4
2009	193	Div 2 Södra Götaland	Tier 4
2010	153	Div 2 Södra Götaland	Tier 4

* Attendances are provided in the Publikliga sections of the Svenska Fotbollförbundet website.
