= Hörby FF =

Swedish football club

- Full name: Hörby Fotbollsförening
- Founded: 1969
- Ground: Hörby IP; Hörby; Sweden
- Capacity: 1.500
- Manager: Admir Maletic
- League: Division 4 Östra Skåne
- 2019: Division 4 Östra Skåne, 12th (relegated)

Hörby FF is a Swedish football club located in Hörby.

== History ==
Hörby FF was founded in 1969 as a merger of IFK Hörby and Hörby BoIF. Hörby FF currently plays in Division 3 which is the fifth tier of Swedish football. They play their home matches at Hörby IP in Hörby.

The club is affiliated to Skånes Fotbollförbund.
