= IK Viljan =

Swedish sports club

- Full name: Idrottsklubben Viljan
- Sport: soccer bandy (earlier)
- Founded: 1914
- Based in: Strängnäs, Sweden
- Ballpark: Vasavallen

IK Viljan is a sports club in Strängnäs, Sweden, established in 1914. The club runs soccer, earlier even bandy. The men's bandy team played in the Swedish top division in 1942. and 1943.

The men's soccer team has played in the Swedish third division.
