= Storfors AIK =

Swedish football club

- Full name: Storfors Allmänna Idrottsklubben
- Founded: 1931
- Ground: Hedens IP Storfors; Piteå; Sweden
- League: Division 3 Norra Norrland
- 2009: Division 4 Norrbotten Södra, 1sr (Promoted)
Home colours	Away colours

Storfors AIK is a Swedish football club located in Piteå.

== Background ==
Since their foundation in 1931 Storfors AIK has participated mainly in the middle and lower divisions of the Swedish football league system. The club's best season was in 1966 when they won Division 3 Norra Norrland Övre which was then the third tier of Swedish football. However, Storfors lost the two legged promotion play-offs with Skellefteå AIK 1–3 on aggregate and missed out on promotion to Division 2.

The club currently plays in Division 3 Norra Norrland which is the fifth tier of Swedish football. They play their home matches at the Hedens IP Storfors in Piteå.

Storfors AIK are affiliated to the Norrbottens Fotbollförbund.

== Recent history ==
In recent seasons Storfors AIK have competed in the following divisions:

2010 – Division III, Norra Norrland
2009 – Division IV, Norrbotten Södra
2008 – Division IV, Norrbotten Södra
2007 – Division IV, Norrbotten Södra
2006 – Division IV, Norrbotten Södra
2005 – Division IV, Norrbotten Södra
2004 – Division IV, Norrbotten Södra
2003 – Division IV, Norrbotten Södra
2002 – Division IV, Norrbotten Södra
2001 – Division IV, Norrbotten Södra
2000 – Division IV, Norrbotten Södra
1999 – Division III, Norra Norrland
1998 – Division III, Norra Norrland
1997 – Division III, Norra Norrland
1996 – Division IV, Norrbotten Södra
1995 – Division IV, Norrbotten Södra
