= Stuguns BK =

Swedish football club

- Full name: Stuguns Bollklubb
- Founded: 1955
- Ground: Stuguns IP; Stugun; Sweden
- Capacity: 1,000
- Chairman: Stefan Wiklund
- Coach: Peter Boije; Marcus Boije
- League: Division 3 Mellersta Norrland
- 2009: Division 4 Jämtland/Härjedalen, 1st (Promoted)
Home colours	Away colours

Stuguns BK is a Swedish football club located in Stugun in Ragunda Municipality, Jämtland County.

== Background ==
Football has been played in Stugun since the mid-1930s but it was not until 1955 that a number of people involved in football in the village decided to form their own club.

Since their foundation Stuguns Bollklubb has participated mainly in the lower divisions of the Swedish football league system. The best period for the club was in the 1980s when they spent a number of seasons in Division 3 Mellersta Norrland which at that time was the third tier of Swedish football. The club currently plays in Division 3 Mellersta Norrland which is the fifth tier of Swedish football. They play their home matches at the Stuguns IP in Stugun. The ground was laid out in the 1960s and is owned by the municipality. Since 2008 the club has run the facility.

Stuguns BK are affiliated to the Jämtland-Härjedalens Fotbollförbund.

== Season to season ==
Season	Level	Division	Section	Position	Movements
1993	Tier 5	Division 4	Jämtland/Härjedalen	7th	
1994	Tier 5	Division 4	Jämtland/Härjedalen	6th	
1995	Tier 5	Division 4	Jämtland/Härjedalen	3rd	
1996	Tier 5	Division 4	Jämtland/Härjedalen	3rd	
1997	Tier 5	Division 4	Jämtland/Härjedalen	4th	
1998	Tier 5	Division 4	Jämtland/Härjedalen	4th	
1999	Tier 5	Division 4	Jämtland/Härjedalen	5th	
2000	Tier 5	Division 4	Jämtland/Härjedalen	4th	
2001	Tier 5	Division 4	Jämtland/Härjedalen	3rd	
2002	Tier 5	Division 4	Jämtland/Härjedalen	2nd	
2003	Tier 5	Division 4	Jämtland/Härjedalen	2nd	Promotion Playoffs
2004	Tier 5	Division 4	Jämtland/Härjedalen	4th	
2005	Tier 5	Division 4	Jämtland/Härjedalen	4th	
2006*	Tier 6	Division 4	Jämtland/Härjedalen	3rd	
2007	Tier 6	Division 4	Jämtland/Härjedalen	1st	Promoted
2008	Tier 5	Division 3	Mellersta Norrland	10th	Relegated
2009	Tier 6	Division 4	Jämtland/Härjedalen	1st	Promoted
2010	Tier 5	Division 3	Mellersta Norrland	6th	
2011	Tier 5	Division 3	Mellersta Norrland	11th	Relegated

* League restructuring in 2006 resulted in a new division being created at Tier 3 and subsequent divisions dropping a level.

== Attendances ==
In recent seasons Stuguns BK have had the following average attendances:

Season	Average attendance	Division / Section	Level
2007	Not available	Div 4 Jämtland/Härjedalen	Tier 6
2008	187	Div 3 Mellersta Norrland	Tier 5
2009	Not available	Div 4 Jämtland/Härjedalen	Tier 6
2010	155	Div 3 Mellersta Norrland	Tier 5

* Attendances are provided in the Publikliga sections of the Svenska Fotbollförbundet website.

Queens Park Rangers attracted more than 1,000 people to Stuguns IP for a friendly match as part of their pre-season training in the early 1980s.
