= FBK Balkan =

- Full name: FBK Balkan
- Founded: 22 November 1962
- Ground: Rosengårds Södra IP, Malmö
- Manager: Nebojša Boban
- League: Division 3 Södra Götaland
- 2025: Division 2 Södra Götaland, 14th
Home colours	Away colours

FBK Balkan is a Swedish football club located in the district Rosengård of Malmö. The club was founded on 22 November 1962. They currently play in Division 3 Södra Götaland. The club comes from a Malmö neighbourhood known for its very large immigrant community. Balkan is most famous for being the club where Zlatan Ibrahimović started playing football. Other notable former players for the team include Goran Slavkovski and Valentino Lai.

== History ==
FBK Balkan was founded on 22 November 1962 in Malmö by Yugoslav immigrants and is named after the Balkans. The club spent many seasons in Swedish Division 6 but later found their way as high as Division 2. The club is one of the oldest immigrants association in Europe. Players of many nationalities have played at the club, from former Yugoslavia (Serbia, Bosnia and Herzegovina, Slovenia, Croatia, Montenegro, North Macedonia, Kosovo), Romania, Albania, Bulgaria, Turkey and Italy.

The club is affiliated to the Skånes Fotbollförbund.

== Season to season ==
Season	Level	Division	Section	Position	Movements
1990	Tier 4	Division 3	Södra Götaland	1st	Promoted
1991	Tier 3	Division 2	Södra Götaland	7th	Vårserier (Spring Series)
	Tier 3	Division 2	Södra Götaland – Hösttvåan	7th	Höstserier (Autumn Series) – Relegated
1992	Tier 4	Division 3	Södra Götaland B	4th	Vårserier (Spring Series)
	Tier 4	Division 3	Södra Götaland	5th	Höstserier (Autumn Series)
1993	Tier 4	Division 3	Södra Götaland	9th	
1994	Tier 4	Division 3	Södra Götaland	10th	Relegated
1995	Tier 5	Division 4	Skåne Sydvästra	4th	
1996	Tier 5	Division 4	Skåne Sydvästra	4th	
1997	Tier 5	Division 4	Skåne Sydvästra	2nd	Promoted
1998	Tier 4	Division 3	Södra Götaland	6th	
1999	Tier 4	Division 3	Södra Götaland	11th	Relegated
2000	Tier 5	Division 4	Skåne Södra	3rd	Promotion Playoffs
2001	Tier 5	Division 4	Skåne Södra	1st	Promoted
2002	Tier 4	Division 3	Södra Götaland	6th	
2003	Tier 4	Division 3	Södra Götaland	9th	Relegation Playoffs – Relegated
2004	Tier 5	Division 4	Skåne Södra	5th	
2005	Tier 5	Division 4	Skåne Södra	3rd	Promotion Playoffs – Promoted
2006*	Tier 4	Division 3	Södra Götaland	7th	
2007	Tier 4	Division 3	Södra Götaland	12th	Relegated
2008	Tier 5	Division 4	Skåne Västra	1st	Promoted
2009	Tier 4	Division 3	Södra Götaland	7th	
2010	Tier 4	Division 3	Södra Götaland	11th	Relegated
2011	Tier 5	Division 4	Skåne Sydvästra	10th	Relegation Playoffs
2012	Tier 5	Division 4	Skåne Sydvästra	9th	Relegation Playoffs
2013	Tier 5	Division 4	Skåne Sydvästra	9th	Relegation Playoffs
2014	Tier 5	Division 4	Skåne Sydvästra	10th	Relegation Playoffs
2015	Tier 5	Division 4	Skåne Sydvästra	5th	
2016	Tier 5	Division 4	Skåne Sydvästra	6th	
2017	Tier 5	Division 4	Skåne Sydvästra	2nd	Promoted
2018	Tier 4	Division 3	Skåne Sydvästra	7th	
2019	Tier 4	Division 3	Skåne Sydvästra	4th	
2020	Tier 4	Division 3	Södra Götaland	1st	Promoted

* League restructuring in 2006 resulted in a new division being created at Tier 3 and subsequent divisions dropping a level.

== Attendances ==
In recent seasons, FBK Balkan have had the following average attendances:

Season	Average attendance	Division / Section	Level
2005	Not available	Div 4 Skåne Södra	Tier 6
2006	103	Div 3 Södra Götaland	Tier 5
2007	89	Div 3 Södra Götaland	Tier 5
2008	Not available	Div 4 Skåne Södra	Tier 6
2009	106	Div 3 Södra Götaland	Tier 5
2010	91	Div 3 Södra Götaland	Tier 5

* Attendances are provided in the Publikliga sections of the Svenska Fotbollförbundet website.
