= Svedala IF =

Swedish football club

- Full name: Svedala Idrottsförening
- Founded: 1908
- Ground: Svedalagårdens IP; Svedala; Sweden
- Chairman: Rickard Anderbeck
- League: Division 3 Södra Götaland
- 2010: Division 3 Södra Götaland, 7th
Home colours

Svedala IF is a Swedish football club located in Svedala in Skåne County.

== Background ==
Svedala Idrottsförening were formed in 1908 and are one of Scania's oldest sports clubs. Today, Svedala IF is only a football club, but this was not always the case particularly in the club's early years when they participated in wrestling, gymnastics, athletics and football. The club currently has more than 300 youth players from the junior school age up to 16 years. There are also men's and ladies teams which the youth system feeds into.

Since their foundation Svedala IF has participated mainly in the middle and lower divisions of the Swedish football league system. The club currently plays in Division 3 Södra Götaland which is the fifth tier of Swedish football. They play their home matches at the Svedalagårdens IP in Svedala.

Svedala IF are affiliated to Skånes Fotbollförbund.

== Recent history ==
In recent seasons Svedala IF have competed in the following divisions:

2011 – Division III, Södra Götaland
2010 – Division III, Södra Götaland
2009 – Division IV, Skåne Södra
2008 – Division IV, Skåne Södra
2007 – Division IV, Skåne Södra
2006 – Division IV, Skåne Södra
2005 – Division IV, Skåne Södra
2004 – Division III, Södra Götaland
2003 – Division IV, Skåne Södra
2002 – Division IV, Skåne Södra
2001 – Division IV, Skåne Södra
2000 – Division IV, Skåne Södra
1999 – Division IV, Skåne Södra

== Attendances ==
In recent seasons Svedala IF have had the following average attendances:

Season	Average attendance	Division / Section	Level
2009	Not available	Div 4 Skåne Södra	Tier 6
2010	104	Div 3 Södra Götaland	Tier 5

* Attendances are provided in the Publikliga sections of the Svenska Fotbollförbundet website.
