= Moheda IF =

Swedish football club

- Full name: Moheda Idrottsförening
- Founded: 1908
- Ground: Moheda IP; Moheda; Sweden
- Chairman: Hans Green
- Head coach: Sergej Prigoda
- Coach: Niklas Cronqvist
- League: Division 3 Sydöstra Götaland
- 2010: Division 3 Sydöstra Götaland, 8th
Home colours

Moheda IF is a Swedish football club located in Moheda in Alvesta Municipality, Kronoberg County.

== Background ==
Moheda Idrottsförening was founded in 1908 and is one of the oldest sports clubs in Småland. The club now concentrates exclusively on football, but in the past has covered athletics, orienteering, skiing, ice-hockey and table tennis within its activities. Lars-Åke Lagrell, the Swedish sports personality and president of the Swedish Football Association, has close links with Moheda IF.

Since their foundation Moheda IF has participated mainly in the middle and lower divisions of the Swedish football league system. The club currently plays in Division 3 Sydöstra Götaland which is the fifth tier of Swedish football. Moheda IF reached their pinnacle in 1979 and 1983 by playing in Division 3, which at that time was the third tier of Swedish football. They play their home matches at the Moheda IP in Moheda.

Moheda IF are affiliated to Smålands Fotbollförbund.

== Recent history ==
In recent seasons Moheda IF have competed in the following divisions:

2015 – Division 6, Tingsryd
2014 – Division III, Nordöstra Götaland
2013 – Division III, Sydöstra Götaland
2012 – Division III, Sydvästra Götaland
2011 – Division III, Sydöstra Götaland
2010 – Division III, Sydöstra Götaland
2009 – Division IV, Småland Elit Västra
2008 – Division IV, Småland Elit Västra
2007 – Division IV, Småland Västra Elit
2007 – Division IV, Småland Elit Norra
2006 – Division IV, Småland Norra Elit
2005 – Division IV, Småland Sydvästra
2004 – Division IV, Småland Sydvästra
2003 – Division IV, Småland Sydvästra
2002 – Division IV, Småland Sydvästra
2000 – Division IV, Småland Sydvästra
1999 – Division IV, Småland Sydvästra

== Attendances ==
In recent seasons Moheda IF have had the following average attendances:

Season	Average attendance	Division / Section	Level
2008	Not available	Div 4 Småland Elit Västra	Tier 6
2009	105	Div 4 Småland Elit Västra	Tier 6
2010	230	Div 3 Sydöstra Götaland	Tier 5

* Attendances are provided in the Publikliga sections of the Svenska Fotbollförbundet website.
