= Malmö City FC =

Swedish football club

- Full name: Malmö City Football Club
- Founded: 2009
- Ground: Kirseberg IP; Malmö; Sweden
- League: Division 4 Skåne västra
- 2014: Division 4 Skåne västra, 6th
Home colours	Away colours

Malmö City FC was a Swedish football club located in Malmö. The club went bankrupt in 2024.

== Background ==
Malmo City Football Club was formed for the 2009 season following the merger of the Kirseberg IF and Rörsjöstaden IF clubs. Kirseberg IF was founded in Kirseberg in Malmo in 1937 under the name BK Vargo.

Since their foundation Malmö City FC has participated in the middle divisions of the Swedish football league system. The club currently plays in Division 3 Södra Götaland which is the fifth tier of Swedish football. They play their home matches at the Kirseberg IP in Malmö. This was previously the home venue of Kirseberg IF.

Malmö City FC was affiliated to the Skånes Fotbollförbund. In 2009 the club was running 20 teams with approximately 600 members.

== Recent history ==
In recent seasons Malmö City FC have competed in the following divisions:

2014 – Division IV, Västra Skåne
2013 – Division IV, Västra Skåne
2012 – Division III, Södra Götaland
2011 – Division III, Södra Götaland
2010 – Division III, Södra Götaland
2009 – Division III, Södra Götaland

== Attendances ==
In recent seasons Malmö City FC have had the following average attendances:

Season	Average attendance	Division / Section	Level
2009	118	Div 3 Södra Götaland	Tier 5
2010	99	Div 3 Södra Götaland	Tier 5
2011	86	Div 3 Södra Götaland	Tier 5
2012	74	Div 3 Södra Götaland	Tier 5
2013	106	Div 4 Västra Skåne	Tier 6
2014	152	Div 4 Västra Skåne	Tier 6

* Attendances are provided in the Publikliga sections of the Svenska Fotbollförbundet website.
