= Malå IF =

Swedish football club

- Full name: Malå Idrottsförening
- Founded: 1936
- Ground: Tjamstavallen; Malå; Sweden
- Chairman: Marina Johansson
- Head coach: No current Coach
- League: Not active
- 2020: Division 5 Västerbotten Norra
Home colours

Malå IF is a Swedish football club located in Malå in Västerbotten County.

== Background ==
Since its foundation Malå IF has participated mainly in the middle and lower divisions of the Swedish football league system. The club is currently not in any league. The highest level the club has been in is Division 3 Norra Norrland which is the fifth tier of Swedish football. They play their home matches at the Tjamstavallen in Malå.

Malå IF are affiliated to Västerbottens Fotbollförbund.

== Recent history ==
In recent seasons Malå IF have competed in the following divisions:

2017- 2020 Division V Västerbotten Norra

2012- 2016 Division IV, Västerbotten Norra

2011- Division III, Norra Norrlan

2010 – Division IV, Västerbotten Norra
2009 – Division IV, Västerbotten Norra
2009 – Division IV, Västerbotten Elit
2008 – Division IV, Västerbotten Norra
2007 – Division III, Norra Norrland
2006 – Division III, Norra Norrland
2005 – Division IV, Västerbotten Norra
2004 – Division IV, Västerbotten Norra
2003 – Division IV, Västerbotten Norra
2002 – Division III, Norra Norrland
2001 – Division IV, Västerbotten Norra
2000 – Division IV, Västerbotten Norra
1999 – Division IV, Västerbotten Norra

== Famous Players ==
Malå IF have had the following talented players:

Player name	DoB	Position	Current club
Ken Burvall	1966	M	Retired
