= IF Haga =

Swedish football club

- Full name: Idrottsföreningen Hagapojkarna
- Founded: 1920 (as IF Hagapojkarna)
- Ground: Strömsbergsvallen; Ljungarum; Jönköping; Sweden
- Chairman: Christina Fritz
- Head coach: Johan Svedberg
- Coach: Anders Wikman
- League: Division 3 Mellersta Götaland,
- 2013: Division 3 Nordöstra Götaland, 2nd
Home colours	Away colours

Previous logo

IF Haga, also known as IF Hagapojkarna, is a Swedish football club located in Jönköping.

== Background ==
Idrottsföreningen Hagapojkarna were founded in 1920 but ceased to operate in the mid-1930s. The club was re-formed in 1944. Over the years it has pursued bandy and ice hockey but now football is the only remaining section. The club has around 1,000 members, most of whom live in Ljungarum. The previous name IF Hagapojkarna was amended to IF Haga at the 2009 Annual Meeting.

Since their foundation IF Haga has participated mainly in the middle and lower divisions of the Swedish football league system. They play their home matches at the Strömsbergsvallen in Jönköping.

IF Haga are affiliated to Smålands Fotbollförbund.

== Recent history ==
In recent seasons IF Haga have competed in the following divisions:

2013 – Division III, Nordöstra Götaland
2012 – Division II, Östra Götaland
2011 – Division III, Nordöstra Götaland
2010 – Division III, Nordöstra Götaland
2009 – Division III, Nordöstra Götaland
2008 – Division III, Nordöstra Götaland
2007 – Division IV, Småland Västra Elit
2007 – Division IV, Småland Elit Norra
2006 – Division III, Nordöstra Götaland
2005 – Division III, Nordöstra Götaland
2004 – Division III, Nordöstra Götaland
2003 – Division III, Mellersta Götaland
2002 – Division III, Sydvästra Götaland
2001 – Division III, Nordöstra Götaland
2000 – Division IV, Småland Nordvästra
1999 – Division III, Sydvästra Götaland
1998 – Division III, Sydvästra Götaland

== Attendance ==
In recent seasons IF Haga have had the following average attendances:

Season	Average attendance	Division / Section	Level
2005	100	Div 3 Nordöstra Götaland	Tier 4
2006	49	Div 3 Nordöstra Götaland	Tier 5
2007	Not available	Div 4 Småland Västra Elit	Tier 6
2008	47	Div 3 Nordöstra Götaland	Tier 5
2009	76	Div 3 Nordöstra Götaland	Tier 5
2010	65	Div 3 Nordöstra Götaland	Tier 5
2011	118	Div 3 Nordöstra Götaland	Tier 5
2012	140	Div 2 Östra Götaland	Tier 4
2013	71	Div 3 Nordöstra Götaland	Tier 5

* Attendance numbers are provided in the Publikliga sections of the Svenska Fotbollförbundet website.
