= IK Östria Lambohov =

Swedish football club

- Full name: Idrottsklubben Östria Lambohov
- Nicknames: Svartgula, Lambo, IKÖL
- Founded: 24 January 1937
- Ground: Lambohovsvallen; Linköping; Sweden
- Capacity: 1,000
- Chairman: (Sweden) Robin Hals
- Head coach: (Sweden) Greger Johansson
- League: Division 4 Östergötland Västra
- 2019: Division 5 Östergötland Västra, 1st
Home colours	Away colours	Third colours

IK Östria Lambohov was a Swedish football club located in Linköping in Östergötland County.

== Background ==
Idrottsklubben Östria Lambohov was founded on 24 January 1937 as Klints IK and in September of the same year changed their name to Bjärka Säby Östra IK.

Since their foundation IK Östria Lambohov participated mainly in the middle and lower divisions of the Swedish football league system. The club's last season was in Division 3 Nordöstra Götaland which is the fifth tier of Swedish football. They play their home matches at the Lambohovsvallen in Linköping.

IK Östria Lambohov were affiliated to Östergötlands Fotbollförbund. The club currently has around 1,500 members of which about 700 are active players. The club runs teams throughout the age groups from the youngest (Soccer for fun) through to the men's and ladies senior sides. The catchment area for the youth section is essentially Lambohov, Slaka and Skeda.

In 2013 the team merged with BK Kenty to form AFK Linköping. In 2018 the team was re-founded.

== Recent history ==
In recent seasons IK Östria Lambohov have competed in the following divisions:

== Season to season ==
Season	Level	Division	Section	Position	Movements
2007	Tier 5	Division 3	Nordöstra Götaland	7th	
2008	Tier 5	Division 3	Nordöstra Götaland	8th	Relegation Playoffs - Not Relegated
2009	Tier 5	Division 3	Nordöstra Götaland	3rd	
2010	Tier 5	Division 3	Nordöstra Götaland	5th	
2011	Tier 5	Division 3	Nordöstra Götaland	4th	
2012	Tier 5	Division 3	Nordöstra Götaland	3rd	
2018	Tier 8	Division 6	Östergötland Mellersta	1st	Promoted
2019	Tier 7	Division 5	Östergötland Västra	1st	Promoted
2020	Tier 6	Division 4	Östergötland Västra		

* League restructuring in 2006 resulted in a new division being created at Tier 3 and subsequent divisions dropping a level.

== Attendances ==
In recent seasons IK Östria Lambohov have had the following average attendances:

Season	Average attendance	Division / Section	Level
2006	Not available	Div 4 Östergötland Västra	Tier 6
2007	117	Div 3 Nordöstra Götaland	Tier 5
2008	121	Div 3 Nordöstra Götaland	Tier 5
2009	120	Div 3 Nordöstra Götaland	Tier 5
2010	169	Div 3 Nordöstra Götaland	Tier 5
2011	186	Div 3 Nordöstra Götaland	Tier 5
2012	203	Div 3 Nordöstra Götaland	Tier 5
2013		Did not compete	
2014		Did not compete	
2015		Did not compete	
2016		Did not compete	
2017		Did not compete	
2018	46	Div 6 Mellersta Östergötland	Tier 8

* Attendances are provided in the Publikliga sections of the Svenska Fotbollförbundet website.
