= IFK Örebro =

Swedish football club

- Full name: Idrottsföreningen Kamraterna Örebro
- Founded: 1900
- Ground: Brickebackens IP; Örebro; Sweden
- Chairman: Lars Göran Ericsson
- Coach: Hans Boberg; Robert Haglund
- League: Division 4 Örebro Län
- 2018: Division 4 Örebro Län, 4th
Home colours	Away colours

IFK Örebro is a Swedish football club located in Örebro.

== Background ==
Idrottsföreningen Kamraterna Örebro were founded in 1900 and are Närke's second oldest sports club. Many of Örebro's clubs have had their roots with IFK Örebro. The Örebro Sports Klub (ÖSK), Örebro Atletklubb and boxing club, Kelly, were all formed after severing their ties with IFK Örebro. In addition to football the club also has an active handball section.

Since their foundation IFK Örebro has participated mainly in the middle and lower divisions of the Swedish football league system. The club currently plays in Division 3 Västra Svealand which is the fifth tier of Swedish football. IFK Örebro have played three seasons in Division 2, in 1933/34, 1935/36 and 1936/37, which at that time was the second tier of Swedish football. They play their home matches at the Brickebackens IP in Örebro.

IFK Örebro are affiliated to Örebro Läns Fotbollförbund.

== Recent history ==
In recent seasons IFK Örebro have competed in the following divisions:

2018 Division IV, Örebro Län
2017 Division IV, Örebro Län
2016 Division IV, Örebro Län
2015 Division IV, Örebro Län
2014 Division IV, Örebro Län
2013 Division IV, Örebro Län
2012 Division IV, Örebro Län
2011 Division III, Västra Svealand
2010 Division III, Västra Svealand
2009 Division III, Västra Svealand
2008 Division III, Västra Svealand
2007 Division IV, Örebro Län
2006 Division III, Västra Svealand
2005 Division IV, Örebro Län
2004 Division IV, Örebro Län
2003 Division IV, Örebro Län
2002 Division IV, Örebro Län
2001 Division IV, Örebro Län
2000 Division V, Örebro Län
1999 Division V, Örebro Län

== Attendances ==
In recent seasons IFK Örebro have had the following average attendances:

Season	Average attendance	Division / Section	Level
2005	Not available	Div 4 Örebro Län	Tier 5
2006	52	Div 3 Västra Svealand	Tier 5
2007	Not available	Div 4 Örebro Län	Tier 6
2008	58	Div 3 Västra Svealand	Tier 5
2009	61	Div 3 Västra Svealand	Tier 5
2010	57	Div 3 Västra Svealand	Tier 5
2011	68	Div 4 Örebro Län	Tier 6
2012	54	Div 4 Örebro Län	Tier 6
2013	64	Div 4 Örebro Län	Tier 6
2014	53	Div 4 Örebro Län	Tier 6
2015	46	Div 4 Örebro Län	Tier 6
2016	60	Div 4 Örebro Län	Tier 6
2017	Not Available	Div 4 Örebro Län	Tier 6
2018	Not Available	Div 4 Örebro Län	Tier 6

* Attendances are provided in the Publikliga sections of the Svenska Fotbollförbundet website and European Football Statistics website.
