= Veberöds AIF =

Swedish football club

- Full name: Veberöds Allmänna Idrottsförening
- Founded: 1929
- Ground: Romelevallen; Veberöd; Sweden
- Chairman: Nils Åke Stålring
- Head coach: Agim Sopi
- League: Division 4 Skåne Västra
- 2013: Division 4 Skåne Södra, 2nd – Promotion Playoffs
Home colours

Veberöds AIF is a Swedish football club located in Veberöd in Lund Municipality, Skåne County.

== Background ==
Veberöds Allmänna Idrottsförening were founded in 1929 with the main focus of the sports club being football. A main highlight for the club was playing in Division 2 Södra Götaland for the first time in 1993 and defeating Trelleborgs FF and IFK Göteborg in the Svenska Cupen.

Since their foundation Veberöds AIF has participated mainly in the middle and lower divisions of the Swedish football league system. The club currently plays in Division 3 Södra Götaland which is the fifth tier of Swedish football. They play their home matches at the Romelevallen in Veberöd.

Veberöds AIF are affiliated to Skånes Fotbollförbund.

== Recent history ==
In recent seasons Veberöds AIF have competed in the following divisions:

2014 – Division IV, Skåne Västra
2013 – Division IV, Skåne Södra
2012 – Division IV, Skåne Östra
2011 – Division III, Södra Götaland
2010 – Division IV, Skåne Sydvästra
2009 – Division III, Södra Götaland
2008 – Division III, Södra Götaland
2007 – Division III, Södra Götaland
2006 – Division IV, Skåne Södra
2005 – Division IV, Skåne Östra
2004 – Division IV, Skåne Östra
2003 – Division V, Skåne Sydöstra
2002 – Division IV, Skåne Södra
2001 – Division V, Skåne Sydvästra B
2000 – Division V, Skåne Sydvästra B
1999 – Division IV, Skåne Södra
1998 – Division III, Södra Götaland
1997 – Division II, Södra Götaland
1996 – Division II, Södra Götaland
1995 – Division II, Södra Götaland
1994 – Division II, Södra Götaland
1993 – Division II, Södra Götaland

== Attendances ==
In recent seasons Veberöds AIF have had the following average attendances:

Season	Average attendance	Division / Section	Level
2006	Not available	Div 4 Skåne Södra	Tier 6
2007	239	Div 3 Södra Götaland	Tier 5
2008	169	Div 3 Södra Götaland	Tier 5
2009	154	Div 3 Södra Götaland	Tier 5
2010	80	Div 4 Skåne Sydvästra	Tier 6
2011	142	Div 3 Södra Götaland	Tier 5
2012	261	Div 4 Skåne Östra	Tier 6
2013	125	Div 4 Skåne Södra	Tier 6
2014		Div 4 Skåne Västra	Tier 6

* Attendances are provided in the Publikliga sections of the Svenska Fotbollförbundet website.
