= IF Väster =

Swedish football club

- Full name: Idrottsföreningen Väster
- Founded: 1973
- Ground: Önneredsplan; Västra Frölunda; Sweden
- Chairman: Alexandra Sellborn
- Head coach: Daniel Natanaelsson
- League: Division 4 Göteborg
- 2022: Division 4 Göteborg,
Home colours

IF Väster is a Swedish football club located in Västra Frölunda.

== Background ==
Idrottsföreningen Väster is a football club from western Gothenburg, with Önnered being the main catchment area. The club was formed in 1973 and has over 1000 active members. In addition to the men's and ladies teams the club runs an extensive youth section for boys and girls. In May 2010 IF Väster opened two new artificial turf pitches, one full size and the other 7-a-side. The most well known player who has represented IF Väster is Patrik Gustafson who played for Jonsereds IF and Örgryte IS before returning to his home club as a player and coach.

Since their foundation IF Väster has participated mainly in the middle and lower divisions of the Swedish football league system. The club currently plays in Division 5 Göteborg which is the seventh tier of Swedish football. They play their home matches at the Önneredsplan in Västra Frölunda.

IF Väster are affiliated to Göteborgs Fotbollförbund.

== Recent history ==
In recent seasons IF Väster have competed in the following divisions:

2011 – Division III, Nordvästra Götaland
2010 – Division III, Nordvästra Götaland
2009 – Division III, Sydvästra Götaland
2008 – Division III, Sydvästra Götaland
2007 – Division III, Nordvästra Götaland
2006 – Division III, Nordvästra Götaland
2005 – Division IV, Göteborg B
2004 – Division IV, Göteborg B
2003 – Division III, Nordvästra Götaland
2002 – Division III, Nordvästra Götaland
2001 – Division III, Nordvästra Götaland
2000 – Division III, Nordvästra Götaland
1999 – Division IV, Göteborg B
1998 – Division IV, Göteborg B
1997 – Division IV, Göteborg B
1996 – Division IV, Göteborg B
1995 – Division III, Sydvästra Götaland
1996 – Division IV, Göteborg B
1996 – Division IV, Göteborg A

== Attendances ==
In recent seasons IF Väster have had the following average attendances:

Season	Average attendance	Division / Section	Level
2001	78	Div 3 Nordvästra Götaland	Tier 4
2002	86	Div 3 Nordvästra Götaland	Tier 4
2003	108	Div 3 Nordvästra Götaland	Tier 4
2004	Not available	Div 4 Göteborg B	Tier 5
2005	Not available	Div 4 Göteborg B	Tier 5
2006	80	Div 3 Nordvästra Götaland	Tier 5
2007	75	Div 3 Nordvästra Götaland	Tier 5
2008	73	Div 3 Sydvästra Götaland	Tier 5
2009	95	Div 3 Sydvästra Götaland	Tier 5
2010	102	Div 3 Nordvästra Götaland	Tier 5

* Attendances are provided in the Publikliga sections of the Svenska Fotbollförbundet website.
