= Åstorps FF =

Swedish football club

- Full name: Åstorps Fotbollförening
- Founded: 1996
- Ground: Bjärshögs IP; Åstorp; Sweden
- Chairman: Andreas Johansson
- Head coach: Bobby Alm Nilsson
- League: Division 2 Västra Götaland
- 2024: Division 3 Sydvästra Götaland, 2rd (Promoted)
Home colours

Åstorps FF is a Swedish football club located in Åstorp in Skåne County.

== Background ==
Åstorps Fotbollförening were formed on 2 December 1996 following the merger of the Åstorps Idrottsförening and Nyvångs Gymnastik and Idrottsförening clubs. Both these clubs had long histories, Åstorps IF being founded in 1913 and Nyvångs GIF in 1922. The club colours of Åstorps FF are white-blue-blue.

Since their foundation Åstorps FF has participated mainly in the middle and lower divisions of the Swedish football league system. The club currently plays in Division 4 Nordvästra Skåne which is the sixth tier of Swedish football. They play their home matches at the Bjärshögs IP in Åstorp.

Åstorps FF are affiliated to Skånes Fotbollförbund.

== Recent history ==
In recent seasons Åstorps FF have competed in the following divisions:

2025 – Division II, Västra Götaland
2024 – Division III, Sydvästra Götaland
2023 – Division III, Sydvästra Götaland
2022 – Division III, Sydvästra Götaland
2021 – Division IV, Skåne Nordvästra
2020 – Division IV, Skåne Nordvästra
2019 – Division IV, Skåne Nordvästra
2018 – Division IV, Skåne Nordvästra
2017 – Division IV, Skåne Nordvästra
2016 – Division V, Skåne Nordvästra
2015 – Division V, Skåne Nordvästra
2014 – Division V, Skåne Nordvästra
2013 – Division IV, Skåne Nordvästra
2012 – Division IV, Skåne Västra
2011 – Division III, Sydvästra Götaland
2010 – Division IV, Skåne Nordvästra
2009 – Division III, Sydvästra Götaland
2008 – Division III, Sydvästra Götaland
2007 – Division III, Sydvästra Götaland
2006 – Division III, Sydvästra Götaland
2005 – Division IV, Skåne Västra
2004 – Division V, Skåne Nordvästra A
2003 – Division V, Skåne Nordvästra A
2002 – Division V, Skåne Nordvästra
2001 – Division V, Skåne Nordvästra
2000 – Division IV, Skåne Norra
1999 – Division V, Skåne Nordvästra

== Attendances ==
In recent seasons Åstorps FF have had the following average attendances:

Season	Average attendance	Division / section	Level
2005	Not available	Div	Tier
2006	164	Div 3 Sydvästra Götaland	Tier 5
2007	160	Div 3 Sydvästra Götaland	Tier 5
2008	110	Div 3 Sydvästra Götaland	Tier 5
2009	93	Div 3 Sydvästra Götaland	Tier 5
2010	92	Div 4 Skåne Nordvästra	Tier 6

* Attendances are provided in the Publikliga sections of the Svenska Fotbollförbundet website.
