= Saxemara IF =

Swedish football club

- Full name: Saxemara Idrottsförening
- Nickname: SIF
- Founded: 1949
- Ground: Hejan; Ronneby; Sweden
- Chairman: Peter Mattsson
- League: Division 3 Sydöstra Götaland
- 2020: Division 3 Sydöstra Götaland, 7th
Home colours

Saxemara IF is a Swedish football club located in Ronneby in Blekinge County.

== Background ==
Saxemara Idrottsförening was founded on 29 August 1949. The club's first chairman was Charles Månsson. The club initially conducted many activities including bandy, athletics, table tennis, orienteering and football. However SIF fairly quickly became a purely a football club.

Since their foundation Saxemara IF has participated mainly in the middle divisions of the Swedish football league system. The club currently plays in Division 3 Sydöstra Götaland which is the fifth tier of Swedish football. SIF played two seasons in Division 2 Södra Götaland, which was then the third tier of Swedish football, in 1993 and 1994. They play their home matches at Hejan in Ronneby.

Saxemara IF are affiliated to Blekinge Fotbollförbund.

== Recent history ==
In recent seasons Saxemara IF have competed in the following divisions:

2016 – Division III, Sydöstra Götaland
2015 – Division IV, Sydöstra Götaland
2011 – Division III, Sydöstra Götaland
2010 – Division III, Sydöstra Götaland
2009 – Division III, Sydöstra Götaland
2008 – Division III, Sydöstra Götaland
2007 – Division III, Sydöstra Götaland
2006 – Division III, Sydöstra Götaland
2005 – Division III, Sydöstra Götaland
2004 – Division III, Sydöstra Götaland
2003 – Division III, Sydöstra Götaland
2002 – Division IV, Blekinge
2001 – Division IV, Blekinge
2000 – Division III, Sydöstra Götaland
1999 – Division III, Sydöstra Götaland
1998 – Division III, Sydöstra Götaland
1997 – Division II, Södra Götaland
1996 – Division II, Södra Götaland
1995 – Division III, Sydöstra Götaland
1994 – Division III, Sydöstra Götaland
1993 – Division III, Sydöstra Götaland

== Attendances ==
In recent seasons Saxemara IF have had the following average attendances:

Season	Average attendance	Division / Section	Level
2005	167	Div 3 Sydöstra Götaland	Tier 4
2006	224	Div 3 Sydöstra Götaland	Tier 5
2007	105	Div 3 Sydöstra Götaland	Tier 5
2008	275	Div 3 Sydöstra Götaland	Tier 5
2009	290	Div 3 Sydöstra Götaland	Tier 5
2010	214	Div 3 Sydöstra Götaland	Tier 5

* Attendances are provided in the Publikliga sections of the Svenska Fotbollförbundet website.

Saxemara IF played a friendly match against the English club Wolverhampton Wanderers FC in 1993 at Brunnsvallen front of nearly 1,600 spectators. The match ended with a 3–1 victory for Wolverhampton.
