= IFK Mariestad =

Association football club in Sweden

- Founded: 1985; 40 years ago
- Ground: Lekevi IP; Mariestad, Sweden
- Chairman: Ulf Svensson
- Coach: Magnus Henriksson
- League: Division 3 Västra Svealand
| Home colours | Away colours |

IFK Mariestad is a Swedish football team based in Mariestad, currently playing in Division 3 Mellersta Götaland.

== Background ==
IFK Mariestad was formed on the 18 December 1985 when the men's football section broke away from Mariestad Bois to form an independent club. Their home ground is at the Lekevi IP.

From its beginnings in Division 6 IFK have progressed slowly and followed their business plan with key objectives and milestones. The club's goal has always been to become an established Division 3 team and in 1999 this target was achieved. However as a newcomer in Division 3 the standard of football was found to be higher than expected and they were relegated back to Division 4 at the end of the season.

The club won Division 4 Västergötland Norra again in 2001 being undefeated throughout the season. This time IFK spent two seasons in Division 3 Mellersta Götaland before relegation. In the subsequent seasons iFK have been playing fifth tier football in the Swedish football league system. In 2009 they were unfortunate to miss promotion by 2 points to Götene IF.

The club is affiliated to the Västergötlands Fotbollförbund. The other main club in the town is Mariestads BK.

== Season to season ==
| Season | Level | Division | Section | Position | Movements |
|---|---|---|---|---|---|
| 1993 | Tier 5 | Division 4 | Västergötland Norra | 8th | |
| 1994 | Tier 5 | Division 4 | Västergötland Norra | 10th | Relegation Playoffs |
| 1995 | Tier 5 | Division 4 | Västergötland Norra | 2nd | Promotion Playoffs |
| 1996 | Tier 5 | Division 4 | Västergötland Norra | 5th | |
| 1997 | Tier 5 | Division 4 | Västergötland Norra | 4th | |
| 1998 | Tier 5 | Division 4 | Västergötland Norra | 1st | Promoted |
| 1999 | Tier 4 | Division 3 | Mellersta Götaland | 12th | Relegated |
| 2000 | Tier 5 | Division 4 | Västergötland Norra | 2nd | Promotion Playoffs |
| 2001 | Tier 5 | Division 4 | Västergötland Norra | 1st | Promoted |
| 2002 | Tier 4 | Division 3 | Mellersta Götaland | 6th | |
| 2003 | Tier 4 | Division 3 | Mellersta Götaland | 9th | Relegated |
| 2004 | Tier 5 | Division 4 | Västergötland Norra | 4th | |
| 2005 | Tier 5 | Division 4 | Västergötland Norra | 2nd | Promoted |
| 2006* | Tier 5 | Division 3 | Mellersta Götaland | 5th | |
| 2007 | Tier 5 | Division 3 | Mellersta Götaland | 3rd | |
| 2008 | Tier 5 | Division 3 | Mellersta Götaland | 8th | |
| 2009 | Tier 5 | Division 3 | Mellersta Götaland | 2nd | |
| 2010 | Tier 5 | Division 3 | Mellersta Götaland | 3rd | |
| 2011 | Tier 5 | Division 3 | Mellersta Götaland | 4th | |
| 2012 | Tier 5 | Division 3 | Västra Svealand | 7th | |
| 2013 | Tier 5 | Division 3 | Mellersta Götaland | 12th Relegated | |

* League restructuring in 2006 resulted in a new division being created at Tier 3 and subsequent divisions dropping a level.

== Attendances ==
In recent seasons IFK Mariestad have had the following average attendances:

| Season | Average attendance | Division / Section | Level |
|---|---|---|---|
| 2005 | Not available | Div 4 Västergötland Norra | Tier 5 |
| 2006 | 260 | Div 3 Mellersta Götaland | Tier 5 |
| 2007 | 192 | Div 3 Mellersta Götaland | Tier 5 |
| 2008 | 166 | Div 3 Mellersta Götaland | Tier 5 |
| 2009 | 284 | Div 3 Mellersta Götaland | Tier 5 |
| 2010 | 186 | Div 3 Mellersta Götaland | Tier 5 |
| 2011 | 193 | Div 3 Mellersta Götaland | Tier 5 |
| 2012 | 137 | Div 3 Västra Svealand | Tier 5 |
| 2013 | 121 | Div 3 Mellersta Götaland | Tier 5 |

* Attendances are provided in the Publikliga sections of the Svenska Fotbollförbundet website.
