= Sävedalens IF =

Swedish football club

- Full name: Sävedalens Idrottsförening
- Nickname: SIF
- Founded: 1932; 94 years ago
- Ground: Vallhamra; Sävedalen; Sweden
- Chairman: Per Hylander
- Head coach: Pierre Krantz
- Coach: Daniel Fhager; Magnus Johansson
- League: Division 2 Norra Götaland
- 2019: Division 2 Norra Götaland, 5th
Home colours

Sävedalens IF is a Swedish football club located in Sävedalen in Partille Municipality, Västra Götaland County.

== Background ==
Since their foundation in 1932 Sävedalens IF has participated mainly in the middle and lower divisions of the Swedish football league system. The club currently plays in Division 2 Norra Götaland which is the fourth tier of Swedish football. They play their home matches at Vallhamra in Sävedalen.

Bertil "Bebben" Johansson started his career with Sävedalens IF. In 1954 he was bought by IFK Göteborg where he successfully spent the rest of his playing career that ended in 1968.

Sävedalens IF are affiliated to the Göteborgs Fotbollförbund.

== Season to season ==
Season	Level	Division	Section	Position	Movements
1997	Tier 5	Division 4	Göteborg A	5th	
1998	Tier 5	Division 4	Göteborg A	4th	
1999	Tier 5	Division 4	Göteborg A	2nd	
2000	Tier 5	Division 4	Göteborg A	6th	
2001	Tier 5	Division 4	Göteborg A	4th	
2002	Tier 5	Division 4	Göteborg A	4th	
2003	Tier 5	Division 4	Göteborg A	7th	
2004	Tier 5	Division 4	Göteborg A	3rd	
2005	Tier 5	Division 4	Göteborg A	1st	Promoted
2006*	Tier 5	Division 3	Nordvästra Götaland	3rd	
2007	Tier 5	Division 3	Nordvästra Götaland	2nd	Promotion Playoffs
2008	Tier 5	Division 3	Nordvästra Götaland	3rd	
2009	Tier 5	Division 3	Nordvästra Götaland	5th	
2010	Tier 5	Division 3	Mellersta Götaland	5th	
2011	Tier 5	Division 3	Mellersta Götaland	1st	Promoted
2012	Tier 4	Division 2	Västra Götaland	9th	
2013	Tier 4	Division 2	Norra Götaland	8th	
2014	Tier 4	Division 2	Västra Götaland	14th	Relegated
2015	Tier 5	Division 3	Mellersta Götaland	1st	Promoted
2016	Tier 4	Division 2	Västra Götaland	7th	
2017	Tier 4	Division 2	Västra Götaland	3rd	

* League restructuring in 2006 resulted in a new division being created at Tier 3 and subsequent divisions dropping a level.

== Attendances ==
In recent seasons Sävedalens IF have had the following average attendances:

Season	Average attendance	Division / Section	Level
2005	Not available	Div 4 Göteborg A	Tier 5
2006	173	Div 3 Nordvästra Götaland	Tier 5
2007	141	Div 3 Nordvästra Götaland	Tier 5
2008	132	Div 3 Nordvästra Götaland	Tier 5
2009	157	Div 3 Nordvästra Götaland	Tier 5
2010	97	Div 3 Mellersta Götaland	Tier 5

* Attendances are provided in the Publikliga sections of the Svenska Fotbollförbundet website.
