= Höörs IS =

Swedish football club

- Full name: Höörs Idrottssällskap
- Founded: 1928
- Ground: Färs & Frosta Arena; Höör; Sweden
- Capacity: ~1000
- Chairman: Anders Rahnboy
- Head coach: Kim Johansson
- League: Division 4 Skåne Östra
- 2025: Division 5 Skåne Sydvästra, 1st
Home colours	Away colours

Höörs IS is a Swedish sports club located in Höör in Skåne County, with activities in football and athletics. The club was founded in 1928.

== Background ==
Since their foundation Höörs IS has participated mainly in the middle and lower divisions of the Swedish football league system. The club currently plays in Division 4 Skåne Östra which is the sixth tier of Swedish football. Höörs IS is known for their connections with the Swedish top club Trelleborgs FF. The exchange of players between the clubs has to this day been very successful. They play their home matches at the Färs & Frosta Arena in Höör. Höörs IS are affiliated to Skånes Fotbollförbund.

In the first half of the 20th century, the club also played bandy, taking part in the Skåne district championship in this sport.

== Recent history ==
In recent seasons, the Höörs IS senior football club has competed in the following divisions:

- 1999 – Division 5 Skåne Mellersta
- 2000 – Division 5 Skåne Östra
- 2001 – Division 5 Skåne Mellersta
- 2002 – Division 5 Skåne Mellersta
- 2003 – Division 5 Skåne Nordöstra
- 2004 – Division 4 Skåne Östra
- 2005 – Division 4 Skåne Östra
- 2006 – Division 4 Skåne Norra
- 2007 – Division 3 Södra Götaland
- 2008 – Division 4 Skåne Norra
- 2009 – Division 4 Skåne Norra
- 2010 – Division 3 Södra Götaland
- 2011 – Division 3 Södra Götaland
- 2012 – Division 3 Södra Götaland
- 2013 – Division 3 Södra Götaland
- 2014 – Division 4 Skåne Västra
- 2015 – Division 5 Skåne Mellersta
- 2016 – Division 5 Skåne Mellersta
- 2017 – Division 6 Skåne Mellersta
- 2018 – Division 7 Skåne Norra
- 2019 – Division 6 Skåne Mellersta
- 2020 – Division 5 Skåne Västra
- 2021 – Division 5 Skåne Västra
- 2022 – Division 5 Skåne Västra
- 2023 – Division 4 Skåne Östra
- 2024 – Division 5 Skåne Västra
- 2025 – Division 5 Skåne Sydvästra
- 2026 – Division 4 Skåne Östra

== Attendances ==
In recent seasons Höörs IS have had the following average attendances:

Season	Average attendance	Division / Section	Level
2006	Not available	Div 4 Skåne norra	Tier 6
2007	103	Div 3 södra Götaland	Tier 5
2008	Not available	Div 4 Skåne norra	Tier 6
2009	Not available	Div 4 Skåne norra	Tier 6
2010	266	Div 3 södra Götaland	Tier 5

* Attendances are provided in the Publikliga sections of the Svenska Fotbollförbundet website.
