= FC Trelleborg =

Swedish football club

- Full name: Football Club Trelleborg
- Founded: 2006
- Ground: Ymorvallen; Trelleborg; Sweden
- Chairman: Erik Arrhenius
- Head coach: Tommy Johnsen Olivius
- Coach: Fredrik Hahne
- League: Division 3 Södra Götaland
- 2010: Division 3 Södra Götaland, 4th
Home colours	Away colours

Previous logo

FC Trelleborg is a Swedish football club located in Trelleborg in Skåne County.

== Background ==
Stavsten/Ymor Fotbollklubb was founded in 2006 and played in Division 3 Södra Götaland. At the end of the 2008 season it was decided to change the name of the club from Stavsten/Ymor FK to FC Trelleborg. This has been a most exciting initiative as the new name has strengthened the club's identity by providing a clearer connection with the city of Trelleborg.

Over the last couple of seasons youth development has continued to thrive which has been reflected by increased membership levels. However, training schedules have become increasingly hampered by the lack of a proper home venue and the club continues to conduct its operations across three locations, namely Ymorvallen, Vannhög and Söderslättshallen. Discussions are continuing to take place with the Recreation Committee of the Trelleborg Municipality to provide new investment to help resolve the issue.

Since their foundation FC Trelleborg has participated in the middle divisions of the Swedish football league system. The club currently plays in Division 3 Södra Götaland which is the fifth tier of Swedish football. They play their home matches at the Ymorvallen in Trelleborg.

FC Trelleborg are affiliated to Skånes Fotbollförbund. Local rivals IFK Trelleborg play in the same division.

In 2024, the U16 youth team of FC Trelleborg will participate in P16 Allsvenskan Södra, the first tier of youth football in Sweden. Their U17 youth team will also participate in a national league, P17 Div.1 - Region 1, the second tier of Swedish youth football.

== Season to season ==
Season	Level	Division	Section	Position	Movements
2006	Tier 5	Division 3	Södra Götaland	3rd	Stavsten/Ymor FK
2007	Tier 5	Division 3	Södra Götaland	8th	Stavsten/Ymor FK
2008	Tier 5	Division 3	Södra Götaland	4th	Stavsten/Ymor FK
2009	Tier 5	Division 3	Södra Götaland	2nd	Promotion Playoffs
2010	Tier 5	Division 3	Södra Götaland	4th	
2011	Tier 5	Division 3	Södra Götaland		

== Attendances ==
In recent seasons FC Trelleborg have had the following average attendances:

Season	Average attendance	Division / Section	Level
2006	91	Div 3 Södra Götaland	Tier 5
2007	73	Div 3 Södra Götaland	Tier 5
2008	101	Div 3 Södra Götaland	Tier 5
2009	125	Div 3 Södra Götaland	Tier 5
2010	122	Div 3 Södra Götaland	Tier 5

* Attendances are provided in the Publikliga sections of the Svenska Fotbollförbundet website.

== Current squad ==
Note: Flags indicate national team as defined under FIFA eligibility rules; some limited exceptions apply. Players may hold more than one non-FIFA nationality.

No.	Pos.	Nation	Player
1	GK	SWE	Marko Lukic
2	DF	SWE	Robin Persson
3	DF	SWE	Christian Ahlström
4	DF	SWE	André Hansson
5	DF	SWE	Andreas Olsson
6	MF	SWE	Sebastian Kristensson
7	MF	SWE	Patrik Halili
8	FW	SWE	Haris Berisha
9	FW	SWE	Sebastian Lindhal
10	MF	SWE	György Millinkhoffer
11	MF	SWE	Mathias Roos

No.	Pos.	Nation	Player
12	DF	SWE	Linus Bladh
13	FW	SWE	Oliwer Wilson
14	MF	SWE	Dennis Ohlsson
15	FW	SWE	Adam Weiszewski
16	DF	SWE	Tobias Hansson
17	DF	SWE	Robin Ohlsson
18	FW	SWE	Andreas Lewitz
19	MF	SWE	Jörgen Håkansson
20	FW	SWE	Johan Palmström
21	MF	SWE	Christoffer Nordgaard
23	GK	SWE	Sebastian Grönberg
