= List of football clubs in Sweden – B =

This is a list of football clubs in Sweden. For women's football clubs, see the list of women's football clubs in Sweden.

== League listings ==
- Allsvenskan
- Superettan
- Division 1
  - Division 1 Norra
  - Division 1 Södra
- Division 2
- Division 3
- Division 4
- Division 5
- Division 6
- Division 7
- Division 8

== Alphabetical listings ==
Contents: A B C D E F G H I J K L M N O P Q R S T U V W X Y Z Å Ä Ö

=== B ===
Club	Division (current)	Division (highest)	Cup (entries)	Settlement	District	Other information
BC Telge Cosmos	No record	No record	1	Södertälje	Södermanland	
BIK/IFK Härnösand	Division 2	Division 2	43	Härnösand	Ångermanland	In 1995, IFK Härnösand and Bondsjöhöjdens IK merged to form BIK/IFK Härnösand. The club subsequently merged with Moffe BK and, following a collaboration with Älandsbro in 2007, is now known as Härnösands FF.
BK Astrio	Division 4	Division 2	20	Halmstad	Halland	
BK Bifrost	Division 7	Division 4	2	Mölndal	Göteborg	
BK Derby	Division 4	Allsvenskan	13	Linköping	Östergötland	Merged with BK Wolfram in 2003 and played two seasons under the name BK Derby/Wolfram.
BK Flagg	Division 4	Division 4	2	Malmö	Skåne	
BK Forward	Division 1	Superettan	35	Örebro	Örebro Läns	
BK Fram	Division 6	Division 3	6	Landskrona	Skåne	
BK Hird	Division 6	Division 3	2	Norrköping	Östergötland	
BK Häcken	Allsvenskan	Allsvenskan	34	Gothenburg	Göteborg	
BK Jugo	No record	Division 4	2	Helsingborg	Skåne	
BK Kenty	Division 3	Division 2	17	Linköping	Östergötland	
BK Kick	Division 6	Division 4	2	Malmö	Skåne	
BK Landora	Division 6	Division 2	14	Landskrona	Skåne	
BK Olympic	Division 2	Division 2	21	Malmö	Skåne	
BK Orren	No record	No record	1	Sollefteå	Ångermanland	
BK Pajala	No record	Division 3	9	Pajala	Norrbotten	Possible link with Pajala IF.
BK Qviding	Division 1	Superettan	27	Gothenburg	Göteborg	Since 1988 known as Qviding FIF.
BK Saturnus	Division 5	Division 3	1	Tyresö	Stockholm	
BK Slätta Damm	No record	Division 3	6	Gothenburg	Göteborg	Also known as BK Slätta Damm/Hajduk.
BK Sport	Division 4	Division 3	6	Eskilstuna	Södermanland	
BK Star	No record	Division 3	1	Södertälje	Södermanland	
BK Start	No record	Division 4	8	Halmstad	Halland	
BK Union	Division 6	Division 4	3	Olofström	Blekinge	
BK Vargarna	Division 3	Division 2	29	Norrtälje	Uppland	Known as BKV Norrtälje since 1989.
BK Viljan	Division 6	Division 5	1	Falkenberg	Halland	Currently known as BK Viljan/IF Älvéna.
BK Wolfram	No record	Division 3	19	Linköping	Östergötland	Merged with BK Derby in 2003 and played two seasons under the name BK Derby/Wolfram.
BK Ymor	No record	Division 3	3	Trelleborg	Skåne	
BK Zeros	Division 5	Division 3	24	Motala	Östergötland	
BKV Norrtälje	Division 3	Division 2	29	Norrtälje	Uppland	Known as BK Vargarna before 1989.
BW 90 IF	Division 3	Division 3	2	Sjöbo	Skåne	Merger of Bjärsjölagårds IF and Vollsjö IF in 1990.
Backa IF	No record	Division 3	16	Gothenburg	Göteborg	
Bagarmossen/Bellevue IK	No record	Division 3	14	Bagarmossen	Stockholm	Also known as Bagarmossens BK. Merged with Kärrtorps BK to form Bagarmossen Kärrtorp BK in 2011.
Bagarmossens BK	No record	Division 3	14	Bagarmossen	Stockholm	Also known as Bagarmossen/Bellevue IK. Merged with Kärrtorps BK to form Bagarmossen Kärrtorp BK in 2011.
Bagarmossen Kärrtorp BK	Division 3	Division 3		Bagarmossen	Stockholm	Formed by merger of Bagarmossens BK and Kärrtorps BK in 2011.
Bankebergs SK	Division 6	Division 4	4	Linköping	Östergötland	Currently known as Vikingstads SK.
Bankeryds SK	Division 4	Division 3	21	Jönköping	Småland	
Bara GoIF	Division 5	Division 4	4	Svedala	Skåne	
Barrsätra SBK	No record	No record	1	Sandviken	Gestrikland	Last record Division 6 in 2000.
Bastuträsk SK	Division 5	Division 4	1	Bastuträsk	Västerbotten	
Bele Barkarby FF	Division 3	Division 3		Järfälla	Stockholm	
Bellevue IK	No record	Division 3	4	Stockholm	Stockholm	Merged with Bagarmossens BK to form Bagarmossen/Bellevue IK.
Bengtsfors IF	Division 5	Division 3	17	Bengtsfors	Dalsland	
Berga GoIF	No record	Division 4	1	Högsby	Småland	
Bergens IF	No record	Division 4	1	Gällivare	Norrbotten	
Bergkvara AIF	Division 4	Division 3	3	Bergkvara	Småland	
Bergnäsets AIK	Division 4	Division 3	13	Luleå	Norrbotten	
Bergs IK	Division 5	Division 3	12	Berg	Jämtland-Härjedalen	
Bergsbyns SK	Division 5	Division 4	1	Skellefteå	Västerbotten	
Bergsjö IF (Göteborg)	Division 4	Division 4	8	Gothenburg	Göteborg	
Bergsjö IF (Hälsingland)	Division 6	Division 4	3	Nordanstig	Hälsingland	
Bergsängs BK	Division 7	Division 3	1	Hagfors	Värmland	
Betsele IF	Division 3	Division 3	7	Lycksele	Västerbotten	
Bie GoIF	Division 6	Division 5	1	Katrineholm	Södermanland	
Billdals BK	Division 7	Division 4	4	Gothenburg	Göteborg	
Billesholms GIF	Division 6	Division 2	8	Bjuv	Skåne	
Billingsfors IK	Division 6	Allsvenskan	8	Billingsfors	Dalsland	
Billsta IF	No record	Division 4	4	Örnsköldsvik	Ångermanland	
Bjurslätts IF	No record	Division 2	5	Gothenburg	Göteborg	Last record Division 6 in 2010.
Bjuråkers GIF	Division 7	Division 4	6	Hudiksvall	Hälsingland	
Bjuvs IF						
Bjärnums GoIF						
Bjärreds IF						
Bjärsjölagårds IF	Division 3	Division 3	2	Sjöbo	Skåne	Merger of Bjärsjölagårds IF and Vollsjö IF in 1990 to form BW 90 IF.
Bjärtrå IS						
Björkenäs/Pukaviks IF						
Björkshults IF						
Björkviks IF						
Björna IF						
Blattnicksele IF						
Blomstermåla IK						
Blåningsmåla IF						
Bockara GIF						
Boda/Ore SK						
Bodabruks GoIF						
Bodens BK	Division 2	Division 1	44	Boden	Norrbotten	
Bogårdens IK						
Bohus IF						
Bolidens FfI						
Bollebygds IF						
Bollnäs GIF	Division 4	Division 2	24	Bollnäs	Hälsingland	
Bollsta IK						
Bollstanäs SK	Division 3	Division 2	10	Upplands Väsby	Stockholm	
Bondsjöhöjdens IK	No record	Division 4	2	Härnösand	Ångermanland	In 1995, IFK Härnösand and Bondsjöhöjdens IK merged to form BIK/IFK Härnösand. The club subsequently merged with Moffe BK and, following a collaboration with Älandsbro in 2007, is now known as Härnösands FF.
Boo FF						
Boo FF/Saltsjöbaden						
Boo IF						
Boo SK						
Borens IK	Division 4	Division 3	8	Motala	Östergötland	
Borensbergs IF						
Bors SK						
Borstahusens BK						
Borås AIK						
Borås GoIF						
Boston SBK						
Botsmarks SK						
Boxholms IF						
Brandbergens IF						
Braås GIF						
Bredaryds IK						
Brinkens IF						
Bro IK						
Broby GoIF						
Broby IF						
Broby/Bettna FC						
Bromstens IK						
Brunflo FK						
Brynäs IF	Division 4	Allsvenskan	17	Gävle	Gestrikland	
Bräcke SK						
Brämhults IK						
Brändons iF						
Brännbergs IF						
Brålanda iF						
Bråtens IK						
Brönstjärns BK						
Brösarps IF						
Bua IF						
Bullarens GoIF						
Bullermyrens IK						
Bunkeflo IF						
Bureå IF	Division 4	Division 3	9	Bureå	Västerbotten	
Burseryds IF						
Burträsk IK						
Byske IF						
Byttorps IF						
Bäckalunds IF						
Bäckefors IF						
Bäckhammars SK						
Bäckseda IF						
Bälinge BIK						
Bälinge IF						
Bålsta IF						
Båstads GIF						
Böda IK						
Bölebyn SK						

See also:

Club	Division (current)	Division (highest)	Cup (entries)	Settlement	District	Other information
IF Brommapojkarna	Superettan	Allsvenskan	37	Bromma	Stockholm	
IK Brage	Superettan	Allsvenskan	42	Borlänge	Dalarna	
