= List of football clubs in Sweden – I =

This is a list of football clubs in Sweden. For women's football clubs, see the list of women's football clubs in Sweden.

== League listings ==
- Allsvenskan
- Superettan
- Division 1
  - Division 1 Norra
  - Division 1 Södra
- Division 2
- Division 3
- Division 4
- Division 5
- Division 6
- Division 7
- Division 8

== Alphabetical listings ==
Contents: A B C D E F G H I J K L M N O P Q R S T U V W X Y Z Å Ä Ö

=== I ===
Club	Division (current)	Division (highest)	Cup (entries)	Settlement	District	Other information
IF Allians						
IF Brommapojkarna	Superettan	Allsvenskan	37	Bromma	Stockholm	
IF Eksjö						
IF Elfsborg						
IF Fram						
IF Hagapojkarna						
IF Heimer						
IF Leikin						
IF Limhamn Bunkeflo						
IF Lödde						
IF Rune						
IF Saab						
IF Sylvia						
IF Triangeln						
IF Trion						
IF Tunabro						
IF Tymer						
IF Väster						
IF Vesta						
IF Viken						
IF Vindhemspojkarna						
IF Vulcanus						
IF Warta						
IF Älgarna						
IFK Arvidsjaur						
IFK Arvika	No record	Division 2	13	Arvika	Värmland	Also known as Arvika BK.
IFK Berga						
IFK Bergvik						
IFK Björkö						
IFK Bofors						
IFK Eskilstuna	Division 3	Allsvenskan	35	Eskilstuna	Västerbotten	
IFK Falköping	Division 3	Division 2	27	Falköping	Västergötland	
IFK Fjärås	Division 3	Division 2	10	Kungsbacka	Halland	
IFK Gnarp						
IFK Grängesberg						
IFK Gävle						
IFK Göteborg	Allsvenskan	Allsvenskan	47	Gothenburg	Göteborg	
IFK Hallsberg						
IFK Hällingsjö						
IFK Härnösand	Division 2	Division 2	43	Härnösand	Ångermanland	In 1995 IFK Härnösand and Bondsjöhöjdens IK Härnösand merged to form BIK/IFK Härnösand. The club subsequently merged with Moffe BK and following a collaboration with Älandsbro in 2007 is now known as Härnösands FF.
IFK Hässleholm						
IFK Hedemora						
IFK Hjo						
IFK Kalix						
IFK Karlshamn						
IFK Kristinehamn						
IFK Kumla						
IFK Lammhult						
IFK Lane						
IFK Lidingö FK						
IFK Luleå						
IFK Malmö						
IFK Mariestad						
IFK Mora FK						
IFK Motala						
IFK Norrköping						
IFK Simrishamn						
IFK Skövde FK						
IFK Stockholm						
IFK Strömstad						
IFK Sundsvall						
IFK Timrå						
IFK Trelleborg						
IFK Trollhättan						
IFK Tumba FK						
IFK Täby FK						
IFK Uddevalla						
IFK Umeå						
IFK Uppsala						
IFK Valla						
IFK Våmhus						
IFK Värnamo						
IFK Västerås						
IFK Vaxholm						
IFK Viksjö						
IFK Visby						
IFK Ystad						
IFK Ålund						
IFK Åmål						
IFK Ölme						
IFK Örby						
IFK Örebro						
IFK Österåker FK						
IFK Östersund						
IFÖ Bromölla IF						
IK Arvika Fotboll	Division 4	Division 3	18	Arvika	Värmland	Previously known as Arvika FK.
IK Bele						
IK Brage	Superettan	Allsvenskan	42	Borlänge	Dalarna	
IK Franke						
IK Frej	Division 1	Division 1	13	Täby	Stockholm	
IK Fyris	Division 4	Division 3	6	Uppsala	Uppland	
IK Gauthiod						
IK Hinden						
IK Huge						
IK Kongahälla						
IK Oddevold						
IK Oden						
IK Sirius						
IK Sleipner						
IK Sture						
IK Sturehov						
IK Tellus						
IK Tord						
IK Vargarna						
IK Östria Lambohov						
IS Halmia						
Iggesunds IK						
Ilsbo SK						
Infjärdens SK						
Inlands IF						
Islingby IK						
