= List of football clubs in Sweden – G =

This is a list of football clubs in Sweden. For women's football clubs, see the list of women's football clubs in Sweden.

== League listings ==
- Allsvenskan
- Superettan
- Division 1
  - Division 1 Norra
  - Division 1 Södra
- Division 2
- Division 3
- Division 4
- Division 5
- Division 6
- Division 7
- Division 8

== Alphabetical listings ==
Contents: A B C D E F G H I J K L M N O P Q R S T U V W X Y Z Å Ä Ö

=== G ===
Club	Division (current)	Division (highest)	Cup (entries)	Settlement	District	Other information
GAIS	Allsvenskan	Allsvenskan	47	Gothenburg	Göteborg	
GIF Nike						
GIF Sundsvall	Superettan	Allsvenskan		Sundsvall		
GoIF Ginsten						
Gagnefs IF						
Galtabäcks BK						
Gamla Upsala SK	Division 2	Division 2	23	Uppsala	Uppland	
Gamleby IF						
Gammelstads IF						
Gantofta IF	Division 6	Division 2	2	Gantofta	Skåne	
Garda IK						
Gefle IF	Allsvenskan	Allsvenskan	40	Gävle	Gestrikland	Known as Gefle IF/Brynäs for 3 seasons.
Gerdskens BK	Division 5	Division 3	24	Alingsås	Västergötland	
Gestrike-Hammarby IF	Division 6	Division 3	15	Sandviken	Gestrikland	
Gideonsbergs IF	Division 5	Division 2	15	Västerås	Västmanland	
Gilleby IF						
Gimo IF						
Gislaveds IS						
Gnesta FF						
Gnösjö IF						
Godhem/HTIF						
Graninge FF	Division 4	Division 3		Helgum	Ångermanland	
Götene IF						
Grebbestads IF	Division 4	Division 3	14	Grebbestad	Bohuslän	
Grebo IK						
Grimetorns IK						
Grimsås IF	Division 4	Division 2	26	Grimsås	Västergötland	
Gröndals IK	Division 5	Division 1	20	Gröndal	Stockholm	
Guldhedens IK						
Gullringens GoIF	Division 3	Division 2	16	Gullringen	Småland	
Gullspångs IF						
Gunnarstorps IF						
Gunnilse IS	Division 2	Division 1	28	Angered	Göteborg	
Gustavsbergs IF						
Gånghesters SK						
Gårda BK						
Gällivare Malmbergets FF	Division 3	Division 3		Gällivare	Norrbotten	Formed by merger of Gällivare SK and Malmbergets AIF in 2005.
Gällstads AIS						
Gällstads FK						
Gävle GIK						
Götaholms BK						
Göteborgs FF						

See also:

Club	Division (current)	Division (highest)	Cup (entries)	Settlement	District	Other information
IFK Göteborg	Allsvenskan	Allsvenskan	47	Gothenburg	Göteborg	
Gimonäs CK	Defunct	Division 1	29	Umeå	Västerbotten	
Gällivare SK	No record	Division 2	26	Gällivare	Norrbotten	Merged with Malmbergets AIF to form Gällivare Malmbergets FF in 2005.
