= List of football clubs in Sweden =

This is a list of football clubs in Sweden. For men football clubs, see the list of men football clubs in Sweden.

== League listings ==
- Allsvenskan
- Superettan
- Division 1
  - Division 1 Norra
  - Division 1 Södra
- Division 2
- Division 3
- Division 4
- Division 5
- Division 6
- Division 7
- Division 8

== Alphabetical listings ==
Contents: A B C D E F G H I J K L M N O P Q R S T U V W X Y Z Å Ä Ö

=== A ===
Club	Division (current)	Division (highest)	Cup (entries)	Settlement	District	Other information
AIK	Allsvenskan	Allsvenskan	54	Solna	Stockholm	
AIK Atlas	Division 4	Division 3	10	Sturkö	Blekinge	
Adolfsbergs IK	Division 4	Division 3	9	Örebro	Örebro	
AFC Eskilstuna						
Agunnaryds IF	Division 5	Division 5	2	Ljungby	Småland	
Ahlafors IF	Division 3	Division 2	11	Nödinge-Nol, Ale	Göteborg	
Akropolis IF	Division 1	Division 1	13	Stockholm	Stockholm	
Alby FF	No record	Division 4	2	Ånge	Medelpad	The club remains active in ladies' football.
Aledals IK	Division 6	Division 5	1	Habo	Småland	
Alets IK	Division 4	Division 2	9	Halmstad	Halland	
Alfredshems IK	No record	Division 3	13	Örnsköldsvik	Ångermanland	Subsequently known as MoDo AIK, MoDo Fotboll, MoDo FF/Domsjö IF, and MoDo FF.
Alfta GOIF	Division 6	Division 3	2	Ovanåker	Hälsingland	Also known as Alfta GIF.
Alingsås IF	Division 3	Division 2	26	Alingsås	Västergötland	
Almhögs Vingar IF	No record	Division 3	1	Malmö	Skåne	Also known as Malmö SK/Almhögs Vingar.
Alnö IF	Division 5	Division 2	22	Alnö	Medelpad	
Alsens IF	Division 3	Division 3	3	Alsen	Jämtland-Härjedalen	
Alsjöholms IF	Division 6	Division 5	1	Nybro	Småland	
Alstermo IF	Division 4	Division 3		Alstermo	Småland	
Alterdalens IF	Division 4	Division 3	1	Altersbruk	Norrbotten	
Alunda IF	Division 5	Division 4	4	Östhammar	Uppland	
Alvesta GoIF	Division 4	Division 2	24	Alvesta	Småland	
Alviks IK	Division 3	Division 2	21	Alvik, Luleå	Norrbotten	
Anadolu IK	No record	No record	1	Stockholm	Stockholm	
Anderslövs BoIK	Division 5	Division 3	11	Trelleborg	Skåne	Also known as Anderslövs BIK.
Anderstorps IF	Division 4	Division 3	20	Gislaved	Småland	
Aneby SK	Division 3	Division 3	9	Aneby	Småland	
Ankarsrums IS	Division 6	Division 4	8	Västervik	Småland	
Annebergs IF	Division 5	Division 3	6	Kungsbacka	Halland	
Annelunds IF	Division 4	Division 2	2	Ljung	Västergötland	
Anundsjö IF	Division 2	Division 1	22	Bredbyn	Ångermanland	
Aplareds IF	No record	Division 4	7	Borås	Västergötland	Also known as Sexdrega/Aplareds IF.
Arameiska-Syrianska KIF	Division 2	Division 1	11	Botkyrka	Stockholm	Also known as Arameiska-Syrianska Botkyrka IF.
Arboga Stad SK	Division 7	Division 7	1	Arboga	Västmanland	Also known as Staden
Arboga Södra IF	Division 4	Division 2	27	Arboga	Västmanland	
Arbrå BK	Division 4	Division 3	16	Arbrå	Hälsingland	
Arentorps SK	Division 5	Division 3	8	Vara	Västergötland	Currently known as Arentorp/Helås FK.
Arlanda FF	Division 6	Division 3	17	Sigtuna	Uppland	Currently known as Arlanda FF/Märsta IK.
Arlövs BI	Division 5	Division 2	25	Burlöv	Skåne	Also known as Arlövs BoIF and Arlövs BIF.
Arnäs IF	Division 6	Division 3	8	Örnsköldsvik	Ångermanland	
Arvesgärde IF	No record	Division 4	2	Gothenburg	Göteborg	Merged with Finlandia/Pallo IF in 2009 to form Finlandia/Pallo AIF.
Arvidstorps IK	Division 6	Division 3	9	Falkenberg	Halland	
Arvika BK	No record	Division 2	13	Arvika	Värmland	Also known as IFK Arvika.
Arvika FK	Division 4	Division 3	18	Arvika	Värmland	Currently known as IK Arvika Fotboll.
Asarums IF FK	Division 4	Division 2	17	Asarum	Blekinge	
Askeröds IF	Division 4	Division 3	20	Hörby	Skåne	
Askims IK	Division 4	Division 2	16	Gothenburg	Göteborg	
Asmundtorps IF	Division 5	Division 2	2	Asmundtorp	Skåne	
Aspeboda SK	Division 5	Division 4	3	Falun	Dalarna	
Aspuddens IK	No record	No record	1	Stockholm	Stockholm	Possible link with IFK Aspudden.
Assi IF	Division 2	Division 2	14	Risögrund	Norrbotten	
Assyriska BK	Division 2	Division 2		Västra Frölunda	Göteborg	
Assyriska Föreningen	Superettan	Allsvenskan	24	Södertälje	Södermanland	Also known as Assyriska FF.
Assyriska Föreningen i Norrköping	Division 2	Division 2	3	Norrköping	Östergötland	Also known as Assyriska IF.
Atlas Copco IF	No record	Division 4	1	Nacka	Stockholm	
Avesta AIK	Division 3	Division 2	32	Avesta	Dalarna	
Axbergs IF	Withdrew	Division 4	2	Örebro	Örebro Läns	
Axvalls IF	Division 6	Division 4	2	Skara	Västergötland	

== See also ==
- List of diaspora football clubs in Sweden

Club	Division (current)	Division (highest)	Cup (entries)	Settlement	District	Other information
BK Astrio	Division 4	Division 2	20	Halmstad	Halland	
