= List of football clubs in Sweden – H =

This is a list of men's football clubs in Sweden. For women's football clubs, see the list of women's football clubs in Sweden.

== League listings ==
- Allsvenskan
- Superettan
- Division 1
  - Division 1 Norra
  - Division 1 Södra
- Division 2
- Division 3
- Division 4
- Division 5
- Division 6
- Division 7
- Division 8

== Alphabetical listings ==
Contents: A B C D E F G H I J K L M N O P Q R S T U V W X Y Z Å Ä Ö

=== H ===
Club	Division (current)	Division (highest)	Cup (entries)	Settlement	District	Other information
Habo IF						
Hagahöjdens BK						
Hagalunds IS						
Hagaströms SK						
Hallstahammars SK						
Halmstads BK	Allsvenskan	Allsvenskan	46	Halmstad	Halland	
Hammarby IF	Allsvenskan	Allsvenskan	46	Johanneshov	Stockholm	
Hamrånge GIF						
Hanaskogs IS						
Hangvar SK						
Hanvikens SK						
Haparanda FF	Division 3	Division 3	12	Haparanda	Norrbotten	
Haparanda SK-Taktik				Haparanda	Norrbotten	
Hargs BK						
Harmångers IF						
Hasslö GoIF						
Heby AIF						
Hedens IF	Division 3	Division 3	10	Boden	Norrbotten	
Hedesunda IF						
Hedesunda IK						
Heffners/Ortvikens IF						
Helenelunds IK						
Helsingborgs IF	Superettan	Allsvenskan	51	Helsingborg	Skåne	
Hemgårdarnas BK						
Hemmingsmarks IF	Division 4	Division 2	24	Hemmingsmark	Norrbotten	
Henåns IF						
Herrljunga SK						
Hertzöga BK						
Hille IF						
Hittarps IK						
Hjärnarps GIF						
Hjulsbro IK						
Hofors AIF						
Holmalunds IF						
Horreds IF						
Hova IF						
Hovås Billdal IF						
Hovmantorps GoIF						
Hovshaga AIF						
Hovslätts IK						
Huddinge IF						
Hudiksvalls ABK						
Hultsfreds FK						
Husby AIK						
Husie IF						
Huskvarna Södra IS						
Husqvarna FF						
Husums IF						
Huvudsta IS						
Hvetlanda GIF						
Hyssna IF						
Håbo FF						
Håfreströms IF						
Hägerstens SK						
Hägglunds IoFK						
Häljarps IF						
Hällefors AIF						
Hälleforsnäs IF						
Härad IF						
Härnösands FF	Division 2	Division 2	43	Härnösand	Ångermanland	In 1995, IFK Härnösand and Bondsjöhöjdens IK Härnösand merged to form BIK/IFK Härnösand. The club subsequently merged with Moffe BK and, following a collaboration with Älandsbro in 2007, is now known as Härnösands FF.
Härslövs IK						
Hässelby SK						
Hässleholms IF						
Högaborgs BK						
Högadals IS						
Höganäs BK						
Högbo AIK						
Högsäters GF						
Högvads BK						
Höllvikens GIF						
Höörs IS						
Hörvikens IF						

See also:

Club	Division (current)	Division (highest)	Cup (entries)	Settlement	District	Other information
BK Häcken	Allsvenskan	Allsvenskan	34	Gothenburg	Göteborg	
IF Haga						
IS Halmia						
IF Heimer						
IFK Holmsund						
IFK Härnösand	Division 2	Division 2	43	Härnösand	Ångermanland	In 1995, IFK Härnösand and Bondsjöhöjdens IK Härnösand merged to form BIK/IFK Härnösand. The club subsequently merged with Moffe BK and, following a collaboration with Älandsbro in 2007, is now known as Härnösands FF.
IFK Hässleholm						
Haningealliansens FF	No record	Division 2	20	Haninge	Stockholm	Merger between Haninge FF and Västerhaninge IF in 1999. Integration with Tyresö FF in 2007.
Helsingborgs Södra BIS	Merger	Division 2	24	Helsingborg	Skåne	Merged with Ramlösa BoIS in 2007 to form Ramlösa Södra FF.
