= List of football clubs in Sweden – F =

This is a list of football clubs in Sweden. For women's football clubs, see the list of women's football clubs in Sweden.

== League listings ==
- Allsvenskan
- Superettan
- Division 1
  - Division 1 Norra
  - Division 1 Södra
- Division 2
- Division 3
- Division 4
- Division 5
- Division 6
- Division 7
- Division 8

== Alphabetical listings ==
Contents: A B C D E F G H I J K L M N O P Q R S T U V W X Y Z Å Ä Ö

=== F ===
Club	Division (current)	Division (highest)	Cup (entries)	Settlement	District	Other information
FBK Balkan						
FBK Karlstad						
FC Café Opera Djursholm						
FC Drottninghög	Division 7					
FC Copa						
FC Gute						
FC Järfälla						
FC Krukan						
FC Plavi Team						
FC Rosengård						
FC Trelleborg						
FC Trollhättan						
FC Väsby United						
FF Södertälje						
FK Bosna 92 Örebro						
FK Linköping						
FoC Farsta						
Falkenbergs FF	Superettan	Division 3	32	Falkenberg	Halland	
Falköpings FK						
Falu FK						
Fanna BK						
Fardhem IF						
Finlandia/Pallo AIF	Division 5	Division 2	1	Gothenburg	Göteborg	Formed by merger of Finlandia IF and Pallo IF. Further merger in 2009 with Arvesgärde IF.
Filipstads FF						
Films SK						
Finnerödja IF						
Finspångs BK						
Fiskeby IF						
Fjärdhundra SK						
Fjärdsjömåla AIF						
Floda BoIF	Division 4	Division 2	17	Floda, Lerum	Göteborg	
Föllinge IK						
Forsbacka IK						
Forshaga IF						
Forssa BK	Division 4	Division 2	25	Borlänge	Dalarna	
Frändefors IF						
Frånö SK						
Fränsta IK						
Frinnaryds IF						
Friska Viljor FC	Division 3	Superettan	32	Örnsköldsvik	Ångermanland	
Fristads GoIF						
Frösö IF						
Frostvikens FF						
Frövi IK	Division 6	Division 3	9	Lindesberg	Örebro Läns	
Furulunds IK						
Fältjägarnas IF						
Färgelanda IF						
Färila IF						
Färjestadens GoIF	Division 3	Division 2	21	Färjestaden	Småland	
Fårösunds GoIK						
Fässbergs IF	Division 3	Division 2	24	Mölndal	Göteborg	

See also:

Club	Division (current)	Division (highest)	Cup (entries)	Settlement	District	Other information
BK Forward	Division 1	Superettan	35	Örebro	Örebro Läns	
IFK Falköping	Division 3	Division 2	27	Falköping	Västergötland	
IFK Fjärås	Division 3	Division 2	10	Kungsbacka	Halland	
IK Frej	Division 1	Division 1	13	Täby	Stockholm	
IK Fyris	Division 4	Division 3	6	Uppsala	Uppland	
Falu BS	No record	Division 2	21	Falun	Dalarna	Joined with Slätta SK and Korsnäs IF FK to form Falu FK in 2006. The club remains active in ladies football.
Furunäs/Bullmark IK	No record	Division 3	6	Bullmark	Västerbotten	Relegated from Division 4 in 2010.
