= List of football clubs in Sweden – E =

This is a list of football clubs in Sweden. For women's football clubs, see the list of women's football clubs in Sweden.

== League listings ==
- Allsvenskan
- Superettan
- Division 1
  - Division 1 Norra
  - Division 1 Södra
- Division 2
- Division 3
- Division 4
- Division 5
- Division 6
- Division 7
- Division 8

== Alphabetical listings ==
Contents: A B C D E F G H I J K L M N O P Q R S T U V W X Y Z Å Ä Ö

=== E ===
Club	Division (current)	Division (highest)	Cup (entries)	Settlement	District	Other information
Eds FF						
Edsbyns IF FF	Division 3	Division 2	17	Edsbyn	Hälsingland	
Edsvalla IF						
Ekerö IK						
Ekets GoIF						
Enångers IK						
Eneby BK	Division 4	Division 3	6	Norrköping	Östergötland	
Enebybergs IF						
Enhörna IF						
Enköpings IS	Division 4	Division 3	19	Enköping	Uppland	
Enköpings SK	Division 1	Allsvenskan	37	Enköping	Uppland	
Enskede IK	Division 2	Division 2	32	Gamla Enskede	Stockholm	
Ersnäs IF						
Eskelhems GoIF						
Eskilsminne IF						
Eskilstuna City FK	Division 1	Division 1	32	Eskilstuna	Södermanland	Until 2000 known as IK City.
Eskilstuna Södra FF	Division 2	Division 2	8	Eskilstuna	Södermanland	
Eslövs BK						
Essinge IK FK						
Essviks AIF						

See also:

Club	Division (current)	Division (highest)	Cup (entries)	Settlement	District	Other information
IF Elfsborg	Allsvenskan	Allsvenskan	52	Borås	Västergötland	
IFK Eskilstuna	Division 3	Allsvenskan	35	Eskilstuna	Västerbotten	
Ersboda SK	Defunct	Division 2	4	Umeå	Västerbotten	
