= List of football clubs in Sweden – D =

This is a list of football clubs in Sweden. For women's football clubs, see the list of women's football clubs in Sweden.

== League listings ==
- Allsvenskan
- Superettan
- Division 1
  - Division 1 Norra
  - Division 1 Södra
- Division 2
- Division 3
- Division 4
- Division 5
- Division 6
- Division 7
- Division 8

== Alphabetical listings ==
Contents: A B C D E F G H I J K L M N O P Q R S T U V W X Y Z Å Ä Ö

=== D ===
Club	Division (current)	Division (highest)	Cup (entries)	Settlement	District	Other information
Dagsbergs IF						
Dala-Järna IK	Division 4	Division 3	7	Järna, Vansbro	Dalarna	
Dalby GIF						
Dalen/Krokslätts FF						
Dalhem IF						
Dalkurd FF	Superettan	Superettan	4	Borlänge	Dalarna	
Dals-Långeds IK						
Dalsjöfors GoIF						
Dalstorps IF						
Danderyds SK						
Danmarks IF						
Dannike IK						
Degerfors IF	Superettan	Allsvenskan	50	Degerfors	Värmland	
Deje IK						
Delsbo IF						
Derby/Saab FF						
Derome BK						
Dingtuna GIF						
Djurgårdens IF	Allsvenskan	Allsvenskan	52	Östermalm	Stockholm	
Djurgårdsbrunns FC						
Djurmo/Segro IK						
Djurmo/Sifferbo IF						
Djurröds IK						
Djursholms Fotboll						
Djurö/Vindö IF						
Domsjö IF						
Donsö IS						
Drottningskärs IF						

See also:

Club	Division (current)	Division (highest)	Cup (entries)	Settlement	District	Other information
BK Derby	Division 4	Allsvenskan	13	Linköping	Östergötland	Merged with BK Wolfram in 2003 and played two seasons under the name BK Derby/Wolfram.
