= List of football clubs in Sweden – M =

This is a list of football clubs in Sweden, for women's football clubs, see the list of women's football clubs in Sweden.

== League listings ==
- Allsvenskan
- Superettan
- Division 1
  - Division 1 Norra
  - Division 1 Södra
- Division 2
- Division 3
- Division 4
- Division 5
- Division 6
- Division 7
- Division 8

== Alphabetical listings ==
Contents: A B C D E F G H I J K L M N O P Q R S T U V W X Y Z Å Ä Ö

=== M ===
Club	Division (current)	Division (highest)	Cup (entries)	Settlement	District	Other information
Malå IF	Division 4 Norra			Malå	Västerbottens Fotbollsförbund	
Malmköpings IF	Division 5			Malmköping	Södermanlands Fotbollsförbund	
Malmö Anadolu BI	Division 6 Sydväst			Malmö	Skånes Fotbollsförbund	
Malmö BI	Division 7 Sydväst			Malmö	Skånes Fotbollsförbund	
Malmö City FC	Division 4 Sydväst			Malmö	Skånes Fotbollsförbund	
Malmö FF	Allsvenskan			Malmö	Skånes Fotbollsförbund	
Malmslätts AIK	Division 3 NÖ Götaland			Linköping	Östergötlands Fotbollsförbund	
Malungs IF	Division 4			Malung	Dalarnas Fotbollsförbund	
Mariebergs IK	Division 5			Örebro	Örebro Läns Fotbollsförbund	
Mariedals IK	Division 5 Södra			Borås	Västergötlands Fotbollsförbund	
Mariehem SK	Division 4			Umeå	Västerbottens Fotbollsförbund	
Marieholms IS						
Mariestads BK						
Markaryds IF						
Markim/Orkesta IF						
Matfors IF						
Medle SK						
Melleruds IF						
Mjällby AIF						
Mjölby AI FF						
Mjölby Södra IF						
Mjölby Turabdin FC						
MoDo FF	No record	Division 3	13	Örnsköldsvik	Ångermanland	Also known as Alfredshems IK, MoDo AIK, MoDo Fotboll and MoDo FF/Domsjö IF.
Moheda IF						
Molidens IK						
Morön BK						
Morups IF						
Mossens BK						
Motala AIF FK						
Munkedals IF						
Munksund Skuthamn SK						
Myresjö IF						
Myssjö-Ovikens IF						
Målilla GoIF						
Månkarbo IF						
Mälarhöjdens IK						
Märsta IK	Division 3	Division 3	17	Sigtuna	Uppland	Also known as Arlanda FF/Märsta IK.
Mölnlycke IF						
Mönsterås GIF						
Mörsils IF						

See also:

Club	Division (current)	Division (highest)	Cup (entries)	Settlement	District	Other information
IFK Malmö
