= List of football clubs in Sweden – C =

This is a list of football clubs in Sweden. For women's football clubs, see the list of women's football clubs in Sweden.

== League listings ==
- Allsvenskan
- Superettan
- Division 1
  - Division 1 Norra
  - Division 1 Södra
- Division 2
- Division 3
- Division 4
- Division 5
- Division 6
- Division 7
- Division 8

== Alphabetical listings ==
Contents: A B C D E F G H I J K L M N O P Q R S T U V W X Y Z Å Ä Ö

=== C ===
Club	Division (current)	Division (highest)	Cup (entries)	Settlement	District	Other information
Carlstad United BK	Division 2	Division 1	10	Karlstad	Värmland	Carlstad United BK is not seen as a continuation of FBK Karlstad, as the latter has continued its operations further down the league system. It is also known as Carlstad United FC.
Citykamraternas BK	No record	Division 4	1	Skellefteå	Västerbotten	
Clemensnäs IF	Division 6	Division 3	8	Skellefteå	Västerbotten	
Croatia BK	Division 6	Division 4	2	Gothenburg	Göteborg	The club merged with Hajduk/Slätta Damm in 2007 to form Hajduk/Croatia BK and is currently known as Croatia Göteborg.

See also:

Club	Division (current)	Division (highest)	Cup (entries)	Settlement	District	Other information
FC Café Opera Djursholm						
