= List of football clubs in Sweden – S =

This is a list of football clubs in Sweden, for women's football clubs, see the list of women's football clubs in Sweden.

== League listings ==
- Allsvenskan
- Superettan
- Division 1
  - Division 1 Norra
  - Division 1 Södra
- Division 2
- Division 3
- Division 4
- Division 5
- Division 6
- Division 7
- Division 8

== Alphabetical listings ==
Contents: A B C D E F G H I J K L M N O P Q R S T U V W X Y Z Å Ä Ö

=== S ===
Club	Division (current)	Division (highest)	Cup (entries)	Settlement	District	Other information
SKIF Semberija						
Sala FF						
Salsåker-Ullångers IF						
Saltö BK						
Sandareds IF						
Sandarna BK						
Sandarne SIF						
Sandåkerns SK						
Sandhults SK						
Sandsbro AIK						
Sandvikens AIK FK						
Sandvikens IF						
Sandviks IK						
Saxemara IF						
Segeltorps IF						
Selånger FK						
Sennans IF						
Sexdrega/Aplareds IF	No record	Division 4	7	Borås	Västergötland	Also known as Aplareds IF. The club remains active in ladies football.
Sibbhults IF						
Sidensjö IK						
Sidsjö-Böle IF						
Sillhövda AIK						
Simonstorps IF						
Sjöbo IF						
Sjömarkens IF						
Sjötulls BK						
Skå IK						
Skanör/Falsterbo IF						
Skara FC						
Skärblacka IF						
Skärhamns IK						
Skellefteå AIK						
Skellefteå FF						
Skellefteå IF						
Skene IF						
Skeninge IK						
Skepplanda BTK						
Skiljebo SK						
Skillingaryds IS						
Skoftebyns IF						
Skogås-Trångsunds FF						
Skogså IF						
Skogsbo-Avesta IF						
Skogslunds IF						
Sköllersta IF						
Skövde AIK						
Skrea IF						
Skultorps IF						
Skultuna IS						
Skutskärs IF FK						
Skyllbergs IK						
Slätta SK						
Slottskogens IK						
Slottsskogen/Godhem IF						
Smedby AIS						
Smedjebackens FK						
Smålandsstenars GoIF						
Snöstorp Nyhem FF						
Solberga BK						
Sollefteå GIF						
Sollentuna United FF						
Sonstorps IK						
Sorsele IF						
Spånga IS FK						
Spårvägens FF						
Spölands IF						
Srbija FF						
Staffanstorps GIF						
Stafsinge IF						
Stattena IF						
Stavstens IF FK						
Stavstens IF						
Stenkullens GoIK						
Stensätra IF						
Stensjöns IF						
Stenungsunds IF						
Stigens IF						
Stockviks FF						
Stora Harrie IF						
Storfors AIK						
Storskogens SK						
Storvreta IK						
Strands IF						
Strömsbergs IF						
Strömsbro IF						
Strömsnäsbruks IF						
Strömtorps IK						
Stugsunds IK						
Stuguns BK						
Stureby SK						
Stuvsta IF						
Stångenäs AIS						
Sund IF						
Sundbybergs IK	Division 4	Division 2	No record	Sundbyberg	Stockholm	
Sunderby SK						
Sunnanå SK						
Sunnersta AIF						
Svalövs BK						
Svartviks IF						
Svedala IF						
Svegs IK						
Svenljunga IK						
Svängsta IF						
Svärtinge SK						
Syrianska FC						
Syrianska Föreningen						
Syrianska IF Kerburan						
Syrianska KF						
Säffle FF						
Säters IF FK						
Sävast AIF						
Sävedalens IF						
Sävsjö FF						
Söderhamns FF						
Söderköpings IK						
Södra Trögds IK						
Sölvesborgs GoIF						
Söråkers FF						
Sösdala IF						

See also:

Club	Division (current)	Division (highest)	Cup (entries)	Settlement	District	Other information
GIF Sundsvall						
IF Sylvia						
IFK Sundsvall						
IK Sirius						
IK Sleipner						
