= List of football clubs in Sweden – V =

This is a list of football clubs in Sweden, for women's football clubs, see the list of women's football clubs in Sweden.

== League listings ==
- Allsvenskan
- Superettan
- Division 1
  - Division 1 Norra
  - Division 1 Södra
- Division 2
- Division 3
- Division 4
- Division 5
- Division 6
- Division 7
- Division 8

== Alphabetical listings ==
Contents: A B C D E F G H I J K L M N O P Q R S T U V W X Y Z Å Ä Ö

=== V ===
Club	Division (current)	Division (highest)	Cup (entries)	Settlement	District	Other information
Vadstena GIF						
Vagnhärads SK						
Valbo FF						
Valby/Västra Klagstorps BK						
Valdemarsviks IF						
Vallens IF						
Vallentuna BK						
Valsta Syrianska IK						
Vansbro AIK FK						
Vara SK						
Varbergs BoIS FC						
Varbergs GIF FK						
Varbergs GoIS						
Vasalunds IF						
Vasasällskapet FK						
Veberöds AIF						
Vebomarks IF						
Veddinge BK						
Vemdalens/Vemhåns FK						
Vendelsö IK						
Vetlanda FF						
Vibergs IF						
Viggbyholms IK						
Vikingstads SK	Division 6	Division 4	4	Linköping	Östergötland	Formerly known as Bankebergs SK.
Viksjöfors IF						
Vimmerby IF						
Vinbergs IF						
Vindelns IF						
Vinslövs IF						
Visby AIK						
Visby IF Gute						
Viskafors IF						
Vittjärvs IK						
Vivalla-Lundby IF						
VMA IK						
VoIF Diana						
Vretstorps IF						
Vämbols FC						
Vänersborgs IF						
Vännäs AIK						
Värmbols FC						
Värmdö IF						
Värnamo Södra FF						
Väröbacka GIF						
Värtans IK						
Värtans SK						
Väsby IK FK						
Västerås BK 30						
Västerås IK						
Västerås SK						
Västerviks AIS						
Västerviks FF						
Västra Frölunda IF						
Västra Karups IF						
Växjö BK						
Växjö Norra IF						
Växjö United FC						

See also:

Club	Division (current)	Division (highest)	Cup (entries)	Settlement	District	Other information
FC Väsby United						
KF Velebit						
IFK Värnamo						
IFK Västerås						
