= List of football clubs in Sweden – L =

This is a list of football clubs in Sweden. For women's football clubs, see the list of women's football clubs in Sweden.

== League listings ==
- Allsvenskan
- Superettan
- Division 1
  - Division 1 Norra
  - Division 1 Södra
- Division 2
- Division 3
- Division 4
- Division 5
- Division 6
- Division 7
- Division 8

== Alphabetical listings ==
Contents: A B C D E F G H I J K L M N O P Q R S T U V W X Y Z Å Ä Ö

=== L ===
Club	Division (current)	Division (highest)	Cup (entries)	Settlement	District	Other information
LSW IF						
Lagans AIK						
Laholms FK						
Landskrona BoIS						
Landvetter IS						
Laxå IF						
Leksands IK FK						
Lerkils IF						
Lerums IS						
Lessebo GoIF						
Lidhults GoIF						
Lilla Edets IF						
Lilla Torg FF						
Lilla Träslövs FF						
Lillpite IF						
Limhamns FF						
Limhamns IF						
Limmareds IF						
Lindås BK						
Lindö FF						
Lindome GIF						
Lindsdals IF						
Linghems SK						
Linköpings FF						
Lira BK						Also known as Lira Luleå BK.
Listerby IK						
Listorps IF						
LiU AIF FK						
Ljunga IF						
Ljungby IF						
Ljungskile SK						
Ljusdals IF						
Ljusne AIK FF						
Ljustorps IF						
Lucksta IF						
Ludvika FK						
Luleå FC						
Luleå SK						
Lundby IF						
Lunden ÖBK						
Lundens AIS						
Lunds BK						
Lunds GIF						
Lyckeby GoIF						
Lycksele IF						
Lysekils FF						
Långholmen FC						
Lärje-Angereds IF						

See also:

Club	Division (current)	Division (highest)	Cup (entries)	Settlement	District	Other information
IF Leikin						
IFK Luleå						
