= List of football clubs in Sweden – R =

This is a list of football clubs in Sweden, for women's football clubs, see the list of women's football clubs in Sweden.

== League listings ==
- Allsvenskan
- Superettan
- Division 1
  - Division 1 Norra
  - Division 1 Södra
- Division 2
- Division 3
- Division 4
- Division 5
- Division 6
- Division 7
- Division 8

== Alphabetical listings ==
Contents: A B C D E F G H I J K L M N O P Q R S T U V W X Y Z Å Ä Ö

=== R ===
Club	Division (current)	Division (highest)	Cup (entries)	Settlement	District	Other information
Rabbalshede IK						
Ramlösa BoIS						
Ramlösa Södra FF						
Rannebergens IF						
Ransta IK						
Rapa-Nui FK						
Rengsjö SK						
Reymersholms IK						
Rimbo IF						
Ringarums IF						
Robertsfors IK						
Ronneby BK						
Roslagsbergs IF						
Roslagsbro IF						
Roslagskulla IF						
Rotebro IS FF						
Rottneros IK						
Runtuna IK/Löthen						
Rutviks SK						
Rydaholms GoIF						
Rynninge IF						
Rynninge IK						
Ryssby IF						
Råå IF						
Rågsveds IF						
Råslätts SK						
Råsunda IS						
Ränneslövs GIF						
Rö IK						
Röbäcks IF						
Rödeby AIF						
Rödsle BK						
Rönninge/Salem Fotboll						Formed by merger of the football sections of Rönninge SK and IFK Salem.
Rönnskärs IF						
Rörviks IF						
