= List of football clubs in Sweden – T =

This is a list of football clubs in Sweden, for women's football clubs, see the list of women's football clubs in Sweden.

== League listings ==
- Allsvenskan
- Superettan
- Division 1
  - Division 1 Norra
  - Division 1 Södra
- Division 2
- Division 3
- Division 4
- Division 5
- Division 6
- Division 7
- Division 8

== Alphabetical listings ==
Contents: A B C D E F G H I J K L M N O P Q R S T U V W X Y Z Å Ä Ö

=== T ===
Club	Division (current)	Division (highest)	Cup (entries)	Settlement	District	Other information
Tandsbyns FK						
Tavelsjö AIK						
Tegs SK						
Tenhults IF						
Tibro AIK FK						
Tidaholms GoIF						
Tillberga IK						
Tollarps IF						
Tomelilla IF						
Topkapi IK						
Torestorp/Älekulla FF						
Torns IF						
Torpa AIS						
Torpshammars IF						
Torsåker IF						
Torslanda IK						
Torstorps IF						
Tranås AIF						
Tranås BoIS						
Tranemo IF						
Tråvads IF						
Trelleborgs FF						
Trollhättans BoIS						
Trollhättans FK						
Trollhättans IF						
Trönninge BK						
Trönö IK						
Tullinge TP FK						
Turebergs IF						
Turkiska SK						
Tvings GoIF						
Tvååkers IF						
Tyresö FF						
Täby IS FK						
Täfteå IK						
Tölö IF						

See also:

Club	Division (current)	Division (highest)	Cup (entries)	Settlement	District	Other information
FC Trollhättan						
IFK Timrå						
IFK Trollhättan						
IK Tord						
