= List of football clubs in Sweden – K =

This is a list of football clubs in Sweden. For women's football clubs, see the list of women's football clubs in Sweden.

== League listings ==
- Allsvenskan
- Superettan
- Division 1
  - Division 1 Norra
  - Division 1 Södra
- Division 2
- Division 3
- Division 4
- Division 5
- Division 6
- Division 7
- Division 8

== Alphabetical listings ==
Contents: A B C D E F G H I J K L M N O P Q R S T U V W X Y Z Å Ä Ö

=== K ===
Club	Division (current)	Division (highest)	Cup (entries)	Settlement	District	Other information
KB 65 IF						
KB Karlskoga FF						
KF Velebit						
Kalmar AIK FK						
Kalmar FF						
Karlbergs BK						
Karle IF						
Karlskoga BK						
Karlskrona AIF						
Karlslunds IF HFK						
Karlstad BK						
Karlstads FF						
Katrineholms SK						
Kils AIK						
Kinna IF						
Kirsebergs IF						
Kiruna FF						
Kisa BK						
Klintehamns IK						
Klippans BIF						
Klippans FF						
Knippla IK						
Knivsta IK						
Kode IF						
Kolsva IF						
Konyaspor KIF						
Korskrogens IK						
Korsnäs IF FK						
Kortedala IF						
Kovlands IF						
Kristbergs IF						
Kristianstad FC						
Krokom/Dvärsätts IF						
Krylbo IF						
Kubikenborgs IF						
Kulladals FF						
Kungsängens IF						
Kungsbacka IF						
Kungsgårdens SK						
Kungshamns IF						
Kungsör BK						
Kungsörs SK						
Kusfors IK						
Kvarnby IK						
Kvarnsvedens IK						
Kvidinge IF						
Kågedalens AIF						
Kågeröds BoIF						
Kållered SK						
Kärra KIF						
Köping FF						
Köpmanholmens IF						

See also:

Club	Division (current)	Division (highest)	Cup (entries)	Settlement	District	Other information
IFK Kumla						
IK Kongahälla						
