= List of football clubs in Sweden – J =

This is a list of football clubs in Sweden. For women's football clubs, see the list of women's football clubs in Sweden.

== League listings ==
- Allsvenskan
- Superettan
- Division 1
  - Division 1 Norra
  - Division 1 Södra
- Division 2
- Division 3
- Division 4
- Division 5
- Division 6
- Division 7
- Division 8

== Alphabetical listings ==
Contents: A B C D E F G H I J K L M N O P Q R S T U V W X Y Z Å Ä Ö

=== J ===
Club	Division (current)	Division (highest)	Cup (entries)	Settlement	District	Other information
Johannishus SK						
Jonsereds IF	Division 2	Division 3	26	Jonsered	Göteborg	Formed by merger of Jonsereds GoIF and Bokedalens IF in 1923.
Jössefors IK						
Junsele IF						
Juventus IF	Division 3	Division 3		Västerås	Västmanland	
Jäders IF						
Jämjö GoIF						
Jämshögs IF						
Järbo IF						
Järla IF FK						
Järvsö BK						
Jönköpings Södra IF	Superettan	Allsvenskan	37	Jönköping	Göteborg	

See also:

Club	Division (current)	Division (highest)	Cup (entries)	Settlement	District	Other information
FC Järfälla						
