= List of football clubs in Sweden – U =

This is a list of football clubs in Sweden, for women's football clubs, see the list of women's football clubs in Sweden.

== League listings ==
- Allsvenskan
- Superettan
- Division 1
  - Division 1 Norra
  - Division 1 Södra
- Division 2
- Division 3
- Division 4
- Division 5
- Division 6
- Division 7
- Division 8

== Alphabetical listings ==
Contents: A B C D E F G H I J K L M N O P Q R S T U V W X Y Z Å Ä Ö

=== U ===
| Club | Division (current) | Division (highest) | Cup (entries) | Settlement | District | Other information |
|---|---|---|---|---|---|---|
| Ulatti IF | | | | | | |
| Ullareds IK | | | | | | |
| Ulricehamns IFK | | | | | | |
| Ulvåkers IF | | | | | | |
| Umedalens IF | | | | | | |
| Umeå FC | | | | | | |
| Unik FK | | | | | | |
| Upsala IF | | | | | | |
| Utsiktens BK | | | | | | |
