= List of football clubs in Sweden – Ö =

This is a list of football clubs in Sweden. For women's football clubs, see the list of women's football clubs in Sweden.

== League listings ==
- Allsvenskan
- Superettan
- Division 1
  - Division 1 Norra
  - Division 1 Södra
- Division 2
- Division 3
- Division 4
- Division 5
- Division 6
- Division 7
- Division 8

== Alphabetical listings ==
Contents: A B C D E F G H I J K L M N O P Q R S T U V W X Y Z Å Ä Ö

=== Ö ===
Club	Division (current)	Division (highest)	Cup (entries)	Settlement	District	Other information
Öckerö IF						
Ödsmåls IK						
Örebro SK Ungdom						
Örebro SK						
Örebro Syrianska IF						
Örgryte IS						
Örta IF						
Östansbo IS						
Östavalls IF						
Österfärnebo IF						
Östermalms IS						
Östers IF						
Östersunds FK						
Östertälje IK						
Östra Ljungby IF						
Östra Ryds IF						
Övertorneå SK						

See also:

Club	Division (current)	Division (highest)	Cup (entries)	Settlement	District	Other information
IFK Ölme						
IFK Österåker						
