= List of football clubs in Sweden – Ä =

This is a list of football clubs in Sweden. For women's football clubs, see the list of women's football clubs in Sweden.

== League listings ==
- Allsvenskan
- Superettan
- Division 1
  - Division 1 Norra
  - Division 1 Södra
- Division 2
- Division 3
- Division 4
- Division 5
- Division 6
- Division 7
- Division 8

== Alphabetical listings ==
Contents: A B C D E F G H I J K L M N O P Q R S T U V W X Y Z Å Ä Ö

=== Ä ===
Club	Division (current)	Division (highest)	Cup (entries)	Settlement	District	Other information
Älmhults IF						
Älta IF						
Älvsborgs FF						
Älvsby IF						
Älvsjö AIK FF						
Ängby IF						
Ånge IF						
Ängelholms FF						
Äppelbo AIK						

See also:

Club	Division (current)	Division (highest)	Cup (entries)	Settlement	District	Other information
IF Älgarna						
