= List of football clubs in Sweden – Y =

This is a list of football clubs in Sweden. For women's football clubs, see the list of women's football clubs in Sweden.

== League listings ==
- Allsvenskan
- Superettan
- Division 1
  - Division 1 Norra
  - Division 1 Södra
- Division 2
- Division 3
- Division 4
- Division 5
- Division 6
- Division 7
- Division 8

== Alphabetical listings ==
Contents: A B C D E F G H I J K L M N O P Q R S T U V W X Y Z Å Ä Ö

=== Y ===
Club	Division (current)	Division (highest)	Cup (entries)	Settlement	District	Other information
Yngsjö IF	Division 6	Division 2	8	Kristianstad	Skåne	
Ystads IF						
Ytterby IS						
Ytterhogdals IK						
Yxnerums IF						

Clubs who have not played in the Svenska Cupen and/or Division 3 or above include:

Club	Division (current)	Division (highest)	Cup (entries)	Settlement	District	Other information
Ysby BK	Division 6	Division 5		Laholm	Halland	
