= List of football clubs in Sweden – Å =

This is a list of football clubs in Sweden. For women's football clubs, see the list of women's football clubs in Sweden.

== League listings ==
Sources:

- Allsvenskan
- Superettan
- Division 1
  - Division 1 Norra
  - Division 1 Södra
- Division 2
- Division 3
- Division 4
- Division 5
- Division 6
- Division 7
- Division 8

== Alphabetical listings ==
Contents: A B C D E F G H I J K L M N O P Q R S T U V W X Y Z Å Ä Ö

=== Å ===
Club	Division (current)	Division (highest)	Cup (entries)	Settlement	District	Other information
Åby IF						
Åhus Horna BK						
Årsunda IF						
Ås IF						
Åsa IF						
Åsarp/Trädets IF						
Åsebro IF						
Åsele IK						
Åsens SK						
Åstorps FF						
Åstorps IF						
Åtvidabergs FF						
