= List of football clubs in Sweden – N =

This is a list of football clubs in Sweden, for women's football clubs, see the list of women's football clubs in Sweden.

== League listings ==
- Allsvenskan
- Superettan
- Division 1
  - Division 1 Norra
  - Division 1 Södra
- Division 2
- Division 3
- Division 4
- Division 5
- Division 6
- Division 7
- Division 8

== Alphabetical listings ==
Contents: A B C D E F G H I J K L M N O P Q R S T U V W X Y Z Å Ä Ö

=== N ===
Club	Division (current)	Division (highest)	Cup (entries)	Settlement	District	Other information
NK Croatia						
Nacka FF						
New Mill FF						
Njurunda IK						
Nora BK						
Nordvärmland FF						
Norrala IF						
Norrby IF						
Norrköpings IF Bosna						
Norrsundets IF						
Norsjö IF						
Nosaby IF						
Notvikens IK						
Nybro IF						
Nykvarns SK						
Nyköpings BIS						
Nynäshamns IF						
Nysätra/Flarken FK						
Näsets SK						
Nässjö FF						
Näsvikens IK						
Nödinge SK						

See also:

Club	Division (current)	Division (highest)	Cup (entries)	Settlement	District	Other information
BK Näset/Höllviken						
BKV Norrtälje						
GIF Nike						
IFK Norrköping						
