= Storskogens SK =

Swedish football club

- Full name: Storskogens Sportklubb
- Founded: 1956
- Ground: Sundbybergs IP; Sundbyberg; Sweden
- Chairman: Christer Ahl
- League: Division 4 Stockholm Norra
Home colours	Away colours

Storskogens SK is a Swedish football club located in Sundbyberg.

== Background ==
Storskogens SK currently plays in Division 4 Stockholm Norra which is the sixth tier of Swedish football. They play their home matches at the Sundbybergs IP in Sundbyberg.

The club is affiliated to Stockholms Fotbollförbund.

== Season to season ==
Season	Level	Division	Section	Position	Movements
2006*	Tier 6	Division 4	Stockholm Mellersta	11th	Relegated
2007	Tier 7	Division 5	Stockholm Mellersta	5th	
2008	Tier 7	Division 5	Stockholm Mellersta	2nd	Promoted
2009	Tier 6	Division 4	Stockholm Norra	5th	
2010	Tier 6	Division 4	Stockholm Norra	8th	
2011	Tier 6	Division 4	Stockholm Norra		

* League restructuring in 2006 resulted in a new division being created at Tier 3 and subsequent divisions dropping a level.
