= Mariebergs SK =

Swedish football club

- Full name: Mariebergs Sportklubb
- Nickname: Berget
- Founded: 1977
- Ground: Stadshagens IP; Stockholm; Sweden
- Chairman: Karl Brander
- Head coach: Jonathan Svensson
- League: Division 4 Stockholm Mellersta
Home colours

Mariebergs SK is a Swedish football club located in Stockholm.

== Background ==
Mariebergs SK currently plays in Division 4 Stockholm Mellersta which is the sixth tier of Swedish football. They play their home matches at the Stadshagens IP in Stockholm. The team is today managed by Jonathan Svensson and his assistant coaches Michael Jonsson and Nils Envald.

The club is affiliated to Stockholms Fotbollförbund.

== Season to season ==
Season	Level	Division	Section	Position	Movements
2006*	Tier 7	Division 5	Stockholm Mellersta	1st	Promoted
2007	Tier 6	Division 4	Stockholm Mellersta	4th	
2008	Tier 6	Division 4	Stockholm Mellersta	6th	
2009	Tier 6	Division 4	Stockholm Mellersta	2nd	
2010	Tier 6	Division 4	Stockholm Mellersta	5th	
2011	Tier 6	Division 4	Stockholm Mellersta	12th	Relegated
2012	Tier 7	Division 5	Stockholm Mellersta	12th	Relegated
2013	Tier 8	Division 6	Stockholm C	5th	
2014	Tier 8	Division 6	Stockholm C	1st	Promoted
2015	Tier 7	Division 5	Stockholm Mellersta	6th	
2016	Tier 7	Division 5	Stockholm Mellersta	8th	
2017	Tier 7	Division 5	Stockholm Mellersta	7th	
2018	Tier 7	Division 5	Stockholm Mellersta	5th	
2019	Tier 7	Division 5	Stockholm Mellersta	1st	Promoted
2020	Tier 6	Division 4	Stockholm Mellersta	7th	
2021	Tier 6	Division 4	Stockholm Mellersta	7th	

* League restructuring in 2006 resulted in a new division being created at Tier 3 and subsequent divisions dropping a level.
