= Hasslö GoIF =

Swedish football club

- Full name: Hasslö Gymnastik-och Idrottsförening
- Founded: 1934
- Ground: Skärgårdsvallen; Hasslö; Sweden
- Chairman: Håkan Karlsson
- League: Division 4 Blekinge
Home colours	Away colours

Hasslö GoIF is a Swedish football club located in Hasslö.

== Background ==
Hasslö GoIF currently plays in Division 5 Blekinge which is the seventh tier of Swedish football. They play their home matches at the Skärgårdsvallen in Hasslö.

The club is affiliated to Blekinge Fotbollförbund. Hasslö GoIF have competed in the Svenska Cupen on 14 occasions.

== Season to season ==
Season	Level	Division	Section	Position	Movements
2006*	Tier 6	Division 4	Blekinge	12th	Relegation Playoffs – Relegated
2007	Tier 7	Division 5	Blekinge	3rd	
2008	Tier 7	Division 5	Blekinge	3rd	
2009	Tier 7	Division 5	Blekinge	4th	Promoted
2010	Tier 6	Division 4	Blekinge	4th	
2011	Tier 6	Division 4	Blekinge	7th	

* League restructuring in 2006 resulted in a new division being created at Tier 3 and subsequent divisions dropping a level.
