= Limhamns FF =

Swedish football club

- Limhamns IP
- Full name: Limhamns Fotbollsförening
- Short name: LFF
- Founded: 2009
- Ground: Limhamns IP; Limhamn; Malmö; Sweden
- Chairman: Rickard Olofsson
- Head coach: Jimmy Hultin
- League: Division 5 Skåne Sydvästra
- 2010: Division 6 Skåne Sydvästra, 3rd (Promoted)
- Website: http://www.limhamnsff.se/
Home colours	Away colours

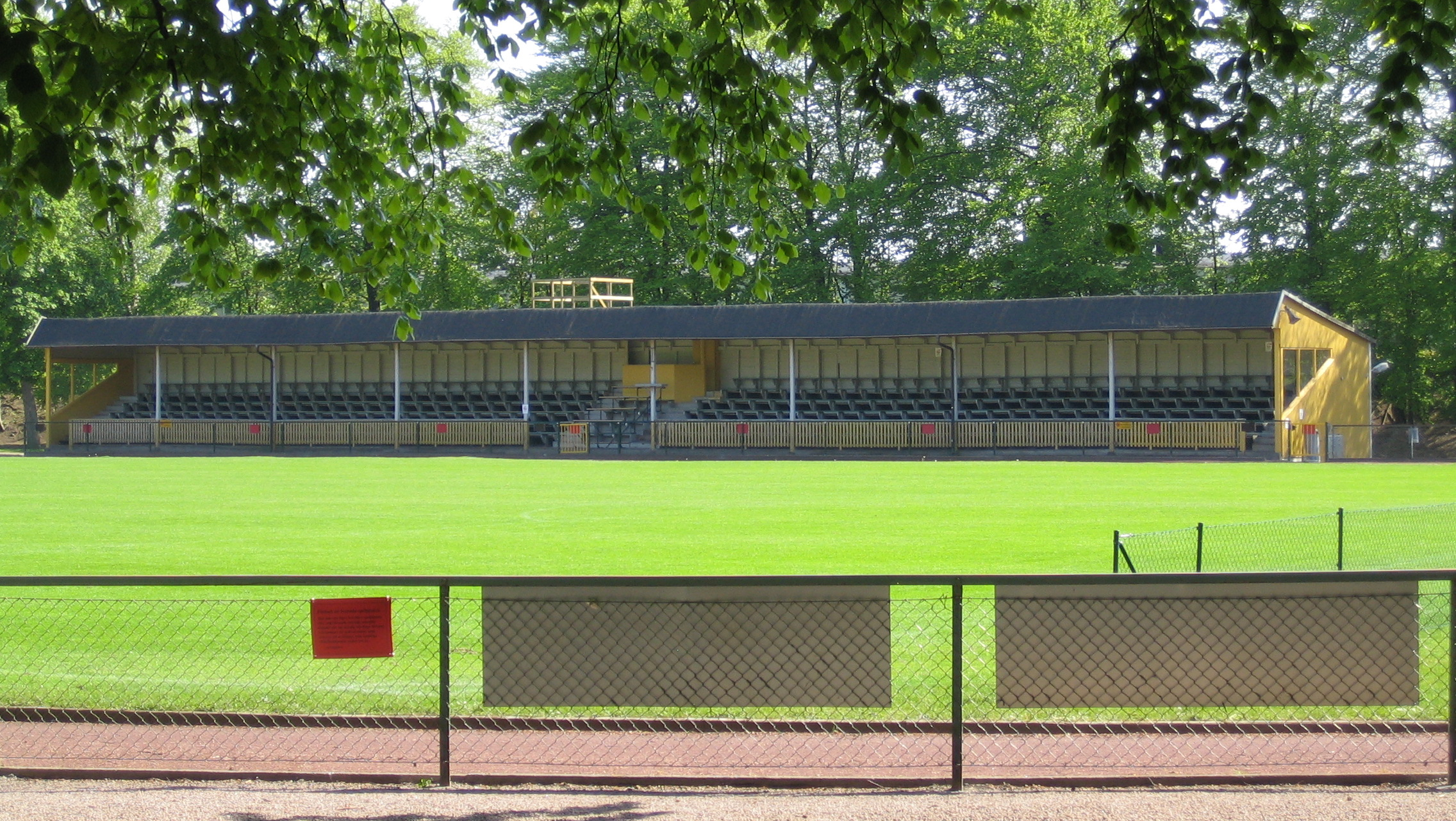
Limhamns IP

Limhamns FF is a Swedish football club located in Limhamn, Malmö.

== Background ==
Since their foundation in 2009 Limhamns FF has participated in the lower divisions of the Swedish football league system. The club currently plays in Division 4 Skåne Sydvästra which is the sixth tier of Swedish football. They play their home matches at the Limhamns IP in Limhamn, Malmö.

Limhamns FF are affiliated to the Skånes Fotbollförbund.

== Season to season ==
Season	Level	Division	Section	Position	Movements
2010	Tier 8	Division 6	Skåne Sydvästra	3rd	Promotion Playoffs – Promoted
2011	Tier 7	Division 5	Skåne Sydvästra	2nd	Promotion Playoffs – Promoted
2012	Tier 6	Division 4	Skåne Sydvästra	3rd	
2013	Tier 6	Division 4	Skåne Södra		

* League restructuring in 2006 resulted in a new division being created at Tier 3 and subsequent divisions dropping a level.
