= Roslagskulla IF =

Swedish football club

- Full name: Roslags-Kulla Idorttsförening
- Nickname: Dom Röde
- Short name: RKIF
- Founded: 1933
- Ground: Lötvallen; Roslagskulla; Sweden
- Chairman: Roger Persson och Hans Forsten
- Head coach: Sonny Nordengrim
- League: Division 5 Stockholm Norra
Home colours	Away colours

Roslagskulla IF is a Swedish football club located in the countryside outside of Åkersberga north of Stockholm.

== Background ==
Roslagskulla IF currently plays in Division 4 Stockholm Norra which is the sixth tier of Swedish football. They play their home matches at the Lötvallen in Roslagskulla outside of Åkersberga.

The club is affiliated to Stockholms Fotbollförbund.

== Season to season ==
Season	Level	Division	Section	Position	Movements
2006*	Tier 7	Division 5	Stockholm Norra	5th	
2005	Tier 7	Division 5	Stockholm Norra	2nd	Promoted
2008	Tier 6	Division 4	Stockholm Norra	12th	Relegated
2009	Tier 7	Division 5	Stockholm Norra	7th	
2010	Tier 7	Division 5	Stockholm Norra	1st	Promoted
2011	Tier 6	Division 4	Stockholm Norra		

* League restructuring in 2006 resulted in a new division being created at Tier 3 and subsequent divisions dropping a level.

== Former Players ==
Viggo Odén - on trial/loan 2022 (Position GK, alternative position LB)
