= Turkiska SK =

Swedish football club

- Full name: Turkiska Sportklubb
- Ground: Spånga IP; Spånga; Sweden
- League: Division 4 Stockholm Mellersta
Home colours	Away colours

Turkiska SK is a Swedish football club located in Spånga / Stockholm.

== Background ==
Turkiska SK currently plays in Division 6 Stockholm which is the sixth tier of Swedish football. They play their home matches at the Spånga IP in Spånga.

The club is affiliated to Stockholms Fotbollförbund.

== Season to season ==
Season	Level	Division	Section	Position	Movements
2006*	Tier 8	Division 6	Stockholm B	8th	
2007	Tier 8	Division 6	Stockholm B	1st	Promoted
2008	Tier 7	Division 5	Stockholm Norra	5th	
2009	Tier 7	Division 5	Stockholm Norra	3rd	
2010	Tier 7	Division 5	Stockholm Norra	2nd	Promoted
2011	Tier 6	Division 4	Stockholm Mellersta		

* League restructuring in 2006 resulted in a new division being created at Tier 3 and subsequent divisions dropping a level.
