= Hedesunda IF =

Swedish football club located in Hedesnunda

- Full name: Hedesunda Idrottsförening
- Founded: 1904
- Ground: Hedesunda IP; Hedesunda; Sweden
- Head coach: Stefan Modin
- League: Division 4 Gestrikland
Home colours	Away colours

Hedesunda IF is a Swedish football club located in Hedesunda.

== Background ==
Hedesunda IF currently plays in Division 4 Gestrikland which is the sixth tier of Swedish football. They play their home matches at the Hedesunda IP in Hedesunda.

The club is affiliated to Gestriklands Fotbollförbund. Hedesunda IF have competed in the Svenska Cupen on 10 occasions and have played 13 matches in the competition.

== Season to season ==
In their most successful period Hedesunda IF competed in the following division:

Season	Level	Division	Section	Position	Movements
1942–43	Tier 3	Division 3	Östsvenska Norra	9th	Relegated

In recent seasons Hedesunda IF have competed in the following divisions:

Season	Level	Division	Section	Position	Movements
1999	Tier 6	Division 5	Gästrikland	6th	
2000	Tier 6	Division 5	Gästrikland	9th	
2001	Tier 6	Division 5	Gästrikland	9th	
2002	Tier 6	Division 5	Gästrikland	4th	
2003	Tier 6	Division 5	Gästrikland	7th	
2004	Tier 6	Division 5	Gästrikland	5th	
2005	Tier 6	Division 5	Gästrikland	6th	
2006*	Tier 7	Division 5	Gästrikland	11th	
2007	Tier 7	Division 5	Gästrikland	5th	
2008	Tier 7	Division 5	Gästrikland	1st	Promoted
2009	Tier 6	Division 4	Gästrikland	9th	
2010	Tier 6	Division 4	Gästrikland	6th	
2011	Tier 6	Division 4	Gästrikland	9th	

* League restructuring in 2006 resulted in a new division being created at Tier 3 and subsequent divisions dropping a level.
