= IFK Viksjö =

Swedish football club

- Full name: Idrottsföreningen Kamraterna Viksjö
- Founded: 1983
- Ground: Viksjövallen; Järfälla; Sweden
- League: Division 4 Stockholm Norra
Home colours

IFK Viksjö is a Swedish football club located in Järfälla outside Stockholm in Sweden.

== Background ==
IFK Viksjö currently plays in Division 3 Stockholm Norra which is the sixth tier of Swedish football. They play their home matches at the Viksjövallen in Järfälla.

The club is affiliated to Stockholms Fotbollförbund. IFK Viksjö played in the 2006 Svenska Cupen but lost 0–1 at home to Hammarby TFF in the first round.

== Season to season ==
Season	Level	Division	Section	Position	Movements
1993	Tier 5	Division 4	Stockholm Norra	5th	
1994	Tier 5	Division 4	Stockholm Norra	4th	
1995	Tier 5	Division 4	Stockholm Norra	7th	
1996	Tier 5	Division 4	Stockholm Norra	2nd	Promotion Playoffs – Promoted
1997	Tier 4	Division 3	Norra Svealand	11th	Relegated
1998	Tier 5	Division 4	Stockholm Norra	7th	
1999	Tier 5	Division 4	Stockholm Norra	2nd	
2000	Tier 5	Division 4	Stockholm Norra	4th	
2001	Tier 5	Division 4	Stockholm Norra	11th	Relegated
2002	Tier 6	Division 5	Stockholm Norra	4th	
2003	Tier 6	Division 5	Stockholm Norra	3rd	
2004	Tier 6	Division 5	Stockholm Norra	3rd	Promoted
2005	Tier 5	Division 4	Stockholm Norra	8th	
2006*	Tier 6	Division 4	Stockholm Norra	8th	
2007	Tier 6	Division 4	Stockholm Norra	9th	
2008	Tier 6	Division 4	Stockholm Norra	4th	
2009	Tier 6	Division 4	Stockholm Norra	8th	
2010	Tier 6	Division 4	Stockholm Norra	6th	
2011	Tier 6	Division 4	Stockholm Norra	6th	
2012	Tier 6	Division 4	Stockholm Norra	6th	
2013	Tier 6	Division 4	Stockholm Norra	1st	

* League restructuring in 2006 resulted in a new division being created at Tier 3 and subsequent divisions dropping a level.
