= Örebro SK (disambiguation) =

Örebro SK is the football section of the Swedish sport club of the same name.

Örebro SK may also refer to:

- Örebro SK Bandy, bandy section
- Örebro SK Handboll, handball section
- Örebro SK Ungdom, youth section

== See also ==
- Örebro
- Örebro Läns Fotbollförbund
