= STFF =

STFF may refer to:

- Subtrochenteric femoral fracture (STFF), see Hip fracture#Diagnosis
- Star Trek V: The Final Frontier (ST:FF), a science-fiction film
- Stockholms Fotbollförbund (STFF), the soccer association of Stockholm, Sweden
