= Bagarmossen Kärrtorp BK =

Swedish football club

- Full name: Bagarmossen Kärrtorp Bollklubb
- Nickname: BKBK
- Founded: 2011
- Ground: Kärrtorps IP; Bagarmossen, Stockholm; Sweden
- Chairman: Jane Lundgren Ericsson
- Coach: Adrian Whale & Mats Oskarsson
- League: Division 4 Stockholm Södra
- 2024: Division 4 Stockholm Södra, 8th
Home colours	Away colours

Bagarmossen Kärrtorp BK is a Swedish football club located in Bagarmossen in the Skarpnäck borough of Stockholm.

== Background ==
In 2011 it was announced that Bagarmossen BK and Kärrtorps BK have formed a new club named Bagarmossen Kärrtorp Bollklubb. Kärrtorps BK's youth section have joined the new club, while Kärrtorps BK's men's teams have formed a new club called Kärrtorps IK.

Since their foundation in 1999 Bagarmossen BK participated mainly in the middle and lower divisions of the Swedish football league system. The new club currently plays in Division 3 Södra Svealand which is the fifth tier of Swedish football. They play their home matches at the Kärrtorps IP in Bagarmossen, Stockholm.

Bagarmossen Kärrtorp BK are affiliated to Stockholms Fotbollförbund.

== Recent history ==
In recent seasons Bagarmossen BK have competed in the following divisions:

2011 – Division 3 Norra Svealand
2010 – Division 3 Norra Svealand
2009 – Division 3 Södra Svealand
2008 – Division 3 Södra Svealand
2007 – Division 4 Stockholm Södra
2006 – Division 4 Stockholm Södra
2005 – Division 4 Stockholm Södra
2004 – Division 4 Stockholm Södra
2003 – Division 3 Östra Svealand
2002 – Division 4 Stockholm Södra
2001 – Division 4 Stockholm Södra
2000 – Division 4 Stockholm Mellersta
1999 – Division 4 Stockholm Mellersta

== Attendances ==
In recent seasons Bagarmossen BK have had the following average attendances:

Season	Average attendance	Division / Section	Level
2007	Not available	Div 4 Stockholm Södra	Tier 6
2008	76	Div 3 Södra Svealand	Tier 5
2009	92	Div 3 Södra Svealand	Tier 5
2010	74	Div 3 Norra Svealand	Tier 5
2011	97	Div 3 Norra Svealand	Tier 5

* Attendances are provided in the Publikliga sections of the Svenska Fotbollförbundet website.
