= Spöland Vännäs IF =

Swedish football club

- Full name: Spöland Vännäs Idrottsförening
- Ground: Vännäs IP; Vännäs; Sweden
- League: Division 3 Mellersta Norrland
- 2012: Division 3 Mellersta Norrland, 3rd

Spöland Vännäs IF is a Swedish football club located in Vännäs.

== Background ==
Spöland Vännäs IF currently plays in Division 3 Mellersta Norrland which is the fifth tier of Swedish football. They play their home matches at Vännäs IP in Vännäs.

The club is affiliated to Västerbottens Fotbollförbund.
