= Konyaspor KIF =

Swedish football club

- Full name: Konyaspor Kultur och Idrottsförening
- Founded: 1989
- Ground: Alby IP; Norsborg; Sweden
- Chairman: Hasan Uludag
- Coach: Edmond Lutaj, David Durmaz
- League: Division 4 Stockholm södra
- 2025: 4th
Home colours	Away colours

Konyaspor KIF is a Swedish football club located in Alby, Stockholm County.

== Background ==
Konyaspor Kultur och IF were founded in 1989 and have Turkish cultural roots, being based among the Turks in Sweden. The club's name and colours comes from the Turkish team Konyaspor.

Since their foundation Konyaspor KIF has participated mainly in the middle and lower divisions of the Swedish football league system. The club currently plays in Division 2 Norra Svealand which is the fourth tier of Swedish football. They play their home matches at the Alby IP in Norsborg.

Konyaspor KIF are affiliated to the Stockholms Fotbollförbund.

== Season to season ==
Season	Level	Division	Section	Position	Movements
1999	Tier 6	Division 5	Stockholm Södra	6th	
2000	Tier 6	Division 5	Stockholm Södra	11th	
2001	Tier 6	Division 5	Stockholm Södra	9th	
2002	Tier 6	Division 5	Stockholm Södra	2nd	Promoted
2003	Tier 5	Division 4	Stockholm Södra	3rd	
2004	Tier 5	Division 4	Stockholm Södra	4th	
2005	Tier 5	Division 4	Stockholm Södra	3rd	Promoted
2006*	Tier 5	Division 3	Östra Svealand	3rd	
2007	Tier 5	Division 3	Östra Svealand	5th	
2008	Tier 5	Division 3	Södra Svealand	6th	
2009	Tier 5	Division 3	Södra Svealand	6th	
2010	Tier 5	Division 3	Östra Svealand	1st	Promoted
2011	Tier 4	Division 2	Södra Svealand	7th	
2012	Tier 4	Division 2	Södra Svealand	10th	Relegation Playoffs
2013	Tier 4	Division 2	Norra Svealand	2nd	
2014	Tier 4	Division 2	Norra Svealand		
