= Gestriklands Fotbollförbund =

- Abbreviation: Gestriklands FF
- Formation: 28 March 1915
- Purpose: District Football Association
- Location(s): Södra Kansligatan 11 80252 Gävle Norrland Sweden
- Chairman: Ola Johansson
- Website: http://gestrikland.svenskfotboll.se/

The Gestriklands Fotbollförbund (Gestrikland Football Association) is one of the 24 district organisations of the Swedish Football Association. It administers lower tier football in Gästrikland in Norrland.

== Background ==
Gestriklands Fotbollförbund, commonly referred to as Gestriklands FF, is the governing body for football in the historical province of Gestrikland. The Association was founded on 28 March 1915 and currently has 46 member clubs. Based in Gävle, the Association's Chairman is Ola Johansson.

== Affiliated Members ==
The following clubs are affiliated to the Gestriklands FF:

- Brynäs IF FK
- FF Nordost-Fotboll
- Forsbacka IK
- Furuviks FF
- Gävle GIK FK
- Gävle Latino FK
- Gefle IF FF
- Gestrike-Hammarby IF
- Hagaströms SK
- Hästbo SK
- Hedesunda IF
- Hille IF
- Hofors AIF
- Högbo AIK
- IFK Gävle
- IK Huge
- IK Sätra
- IK Sport
- Jädraås Allmänna IK
- Järbo IF
- Korpföreningen Heros
- Korsnäs BK
- Kungsgårdens SK
- Lingbo IF
- Norrham Hamrångebygdens IF
- Norrsundets IF
- Ockelbo IF
- Sandvikens AIK FK
- Sandvikens IF
- Sätra DFK
- Sjötulls BK
- Skutskärs IF FK
- Södra BK
- Stensätra IF
- Storviks IF
- Strömsbro IF
- Torsåkers IF
- Valbo FF
- Åbyggeby FK
- Åbyggeby FK / Ockelbo
- Åmots IF
- Årsunda IF
- Åshammars IK
- Örta IF
- Österfärnebo IF
- Överhärde IK

== League Competitions ==
Gestriklands FF run the following League Competitions:

=== Men's Football ===
Division 4 - one section
Division 5 - one section
Division 6 - two sections
Division 7 - three sections

=== Women's Football ===
Division 3 - one section
Division 4 - one section
