= Sunnersta AIF =

Swedish football club

- Full name: Sunnersta Allmänna Idrottsförening
- Ground: Sunnersta IP; Uppsala; Sweden
- League: Division 2

Sunnersta AIF is a Swedish football club located in Uppsala.

== Background ==
Sunnersta AIF currently plays in Division 2 Norra Svealand which is the fourth tier of Swedish football. They play their home matches at Sunnersta IP in Uppsala.

The club is affiliated to Upplands Fotbollförbund.
