= Långholmen FC =

Swedish football club

Långholmen Football Club
- Full name: Långholmen Football Club
- Nickname: The Stripes
- Short name: LFC
- Founded: 2002
- Ground: Essinge IP; Stockholm; Sweden
- Chairman: Peter Vinthagen Simpson
- League: Division 4 Mellersta
- 2018: Division 4 Stockholm Mellersta
- Website: www.langholmenfc.com/
Home colours	Away colours

Långholmen FC is a Swedish football club based in Långholmen, Stockholm.

== Background ==
Långholmen Football Club was formed in 2002 by a dozen or so English-speaking exiles looking for exercise and a chance to show their ability on a Saturday afternoon.

The club is now an important part of the sporting and social life of the expatriate community in Stockholm with well over a hundred members. Since 2002 their teams have won five championships, eleven promotions and the Stockholm Korpen champions trophy. Their first team has climbed steadily up the Stockholm leagues.

In 2010 they made it to the national league system and played in Division Three. However, 2011 saw them in Division Four again.

In total, LFC have eight teams: six men's and two women's; regular structured training; casual kickabouts.

They won an international tournament in Berlin and have hosted matches in Stockholm to their international friends, for instance they have played the Royal Household Staff team from London, England and in 2010 the Tartan Army team before the Scotland-Sweden match plus the Royal Epsom team from the UK.

In 2011, Långholmen reached the final of the Stockholm Cup but ended up runners up after a defeat by Sollentuna FC in the final (7–4). Nevertheless, this achievement meant they were then placed in the rounds of the Swedish Cup and, after defeating more opponents in earlier rounds, they were then drawn against IFK Göteborg, Sweden's most successful club ever (who have won 18 national championship titles, five national cup titles, and two UEFA Cups) in the next Svenska Cupen. This match was played on 20 August 2012 at Grimsta IP and without a doubt the biggest day ever in the club's history and one that created mass media hype both in Sweden and abroad with major newspapers (Guardian, La Stampa, DN to name but a few), TV, radio stations and websites spreading the news – the David v Goliath romance of football. The match ended with a 9–0 defeat but the celebrations at the end by the home team and fans seemed like LFC had actually won. The team, club and fans (687) were extremely proud of this historic match.

Although English is generally the main language used by Långholmen players and the majority of members have tended to be from the British Isles, the club includes an international mix of players, having had 68 different nationalities play for them.

Långholmen FC are affiliated to the Stockholms Fotbollförbund. In a decision with some parallels to the landmark Bosman ruling, the Swedish Football Association granted Långholmen FC a temporary dispensation for the 2010 season from regulations requiring a quota of Sweden-bred players in match day squads. The club appealed because they had only five players who qualified as homegrown players.

== Season to season ==
Season	Level	Division	Section	Position	Movements
2003	Tier 9	Division 8	Stockholm I	3rd	Promoted
2004	Tier 8	Division 7	Stockholm G	5th	
2005	Tier 8	Division 7	Stockholm H	1st	Promoted
2006*	Tier 8	Division 6	Stockholm D	3rd	Promoted
2007	Tier 7	Division 5	Stockholm Södra	2nd	Promoted
2008	Tier 6	Division 4	Stockholm Norra	8th	
2009	Tier 6	Division 4	Stockholm Mellersta	1st	Promoted
2010	Tier 5	Division 3	Östra Svealand	11th	Relegated
2011	Tier 6	Division 4	Stockholm Mellersta	5th	
2012	Tier 6	Division 4	Stockholm Mellersta	11th	Relegated
2013	Tier 7	Division 5	Stockholm Mellersta	9th	
2014	Tier 7	Division 5	Stockholm Mellersta	1st	Promoted
2015	Tier 6	Division 4	Stockholm Mellersta	11th	Relegated
2016	Tier 7	Division 5	Stockholm Mellersta	1st	Promoted
2017	Tier 6	Division 4	Stockholm Mellersta	9th	
2018	Tier 6	Division 4	Stockholm Mellersta	6th	
2019	Tier 6	Division 4	Stockholm Mellersta	8th	
2020	Tier 6	Division 4	Stockholm Mellersta	8th	

* League restructuring in 2006 resulted in a new division being created at Tier 3 and subsequent divisions dropping a level. |}

== Honours ==
Division 4

- Champions 2009

Division 5

- Champions 2014 & 2016
- Runners-up 2007

Division 7

- Champions 2005

Stockholm Cup

- Runners-up 2011

== Attendances ==
In recent seasons Långholmen FC have had the following average attendances:

Season	Average attendance	Division / Section	Level
2009	106	Div 4 Stockholm Mellersta	Tier 6
2010	78	Div 3 Östra Svealand	Tier 5
2012	687	Svenska Cupen	Tier 6

* Attendances are provided in the Publikliga sections of the Svenska Fotbollförbundet website.
