= Vendelsö IK =

Swedish football club

- Full name: Vendelsö Idrottsklubb
- Founded: 1941
- Ground: Torvalla IP; Haninge; Sweden
- Chairman: Göran Tibäck
- Head coach: Ferhat Boz
- Coach: Thomas Pettersson; Johan Sjöqvist
- League: Division 3 Södra Svealand
- 2010: Division 4 Stockholm Södra, 1st (Promoted)
Home colours

Vendelsö IK is a Swedish football club located in Haninge in Stockholm County.

== Background ==
Vendelsö Idrottsklubb were formed on 16 March 1941. The club currently has around 2,500 members and runs football, floorball, and table tennis from the seniors to the "junior" level. The club also had an ice hockey section which merged with Haninge HF and Västerhaninge IF in May 2013 to become Haninge Anchors HC.

Since their foundation, Vendelsö IK's football team has participated mainly in the middle and lower divisions of the Swedish football league system. The club currently plays in Division 3 Södra Svealand which is the fifth tier of Swedish football. They play their home matches at the Torvalla IP in Haninge.

Vendelsö IK are affiliated to Stockholms Fotbollförbund.

== Recent history ==
In recent seasons Vendelsö IK have competed in the following divisions:

2011 – Division III, Södra Svealand
2010 – Division IV, Stockholm Södra
2009 – Division IV, Stockholm Södra
2008 – Division V, Stockholm Södra
2007 – Division IV, Stockholm Södra
2006 – Division IV, Stockholm Södra
2005 – Division V, Stockholm Södra
2004 – Division V, Stockholm Södra
2003 – Division IV, Stockholm Södra
2002 – Division IV, Stockholm Södra
2001 – Division IV, Stockholm Södra
2000 – Division V, Stockholm Södra
1999 – Division V, Stockholm Södra

== Attendances ==
In recent seasons Vendelsö IK have had the following average attendances:

Season	Average attendance	Division / Section	Level
2009	Not available	Div 4 Stockholm Södra	Tier 6
2010		Div 4 Stockholm Södra	Tier 6
2011	138	Div 3 Södra Svealand	Tier 5

* Attendances are provided in the Publikliga sections of the Svenska Fotbollförbundet website.
