= Hille IF =

Swedish football club

- Full name: Hille Idrottsförening
- Founded: 1922
- Ground: Strömvallen; Gävle; Sweden
- League: Swedish Division 4 Södra Norrland
Home colours	Away colours

Hille IF is a Swedish football club located in Gävle in Gävleborg County.

== Background ==
Hille Idrottsförening were founded in 1922. The football section has around 500 active members, including a small league for 5–6 year olds, football school, boys and girls' teams, juniors, and two men's teams in Division III and V, and women's teams in Division IV.

Since their foundation Hille IF has participated mainly in the middle and lower divisions of the Swedish football league system. The club mainlys plays in Division 3 and Division 4 Södra Norrland which are the fifth and sixth tiers of Swedish football. They play their home matches at Hille IP in Gävle.

Hille IF are affiliated to Gestriklands Fotbollförbund.
