= Blekinge Fotbollförbund =

Association football district association

- Abbreviation: Blekinge FF
- Formation: 25 March 1917
- Purpose: District Football Association
- Location(s): Rådhusgatan 28 37436 Karlshamn Blekinge Sweden
- Chairman: Per-Ola Johansson
- Website: http://blekinge.svenskfotboll.se/

The Blekinge Fotbollförbund (Blekinge Football Association) is one of the 24 district organisations of the Swedish Football Association. It administers lower tier football in Blekinge County.

== Background ==
Blekinge Fotbollförbund, commonly referred to as Blekinge FF, is the governing body for football in the County of Blekinge. The Association was founded on 25 March 1917 and currently has 63 member clubs. Based in Karlshamn, the Association's Chairman is Per-Ola Johansson.

== Affiliated Members ==
The following clubs are affiliated to the Blekinge FF:

- AIK Atlas
- Ankaret FK
- Asarums FF
- Asarums IF FK
- Backaryd SK
- Belganet-Hallabro IF
- Björkenäs-Pukaviks IF
- BK Eken
- BK Glasbacken
- BK Union
- Blåningsmåla IF
- Drottningskärs IF
- Eringsboda SK
- FC Fridhem
- FC Giffarna
- Fjärdsjömåla AIF
- FK Sölvesborg United
- Fridlevstad GoIF
- Gammalstorps GoIF
- Gränums IF
- Halasjö AIF
- Hällaryds IF
- Hanö IF
- Hasselstad BK
- Hasslö GoIF
- Hemsjö AIK
- Hoby GIF
- Högadals IS
- Hörvikens IF
- IF Lörbytjejerna
- IF Trion
- IFK Karlshamn
- Jämjö GoIF
- Jämshögs IF
- Johannishus SK
- Kallinge SK
- Karlskrona AIF
- Karlskrona FC
- Karlskrona FF
- Karlskrona FK
- Kristianopels GoIF
- Listerby IK
- Lörby IF
- Lyckeby GoIF
- Märserums IF
- Mjällby AIF
- Mörrums GoIS FK
- Nättraby GoIF
- Olofströms IF
- Ramdala IF
- Ringamåla IK
- Rödeby AIF
- Rödeby FC
- Ronneby BK
- Saxemara IF
- Sifarna FF
- Sillhövda AIK
- Sölve BK
- Sölvesborgs GoIF
- Svängsta IF
- Torhamns GoIF
- Tvings GoIF
- Vilshults IF

== League Competitions ==
Blekinge FF run the following League Competitions:

=== Men's Football ===
Division 4 - one section
Division 5 - one section
Division 6 - two sections

=== Women's Football ===
Division 4 - one section
Division 5 - one section
