= Västmanlands Fotbollförbund =

- Abbreviation: Västmanlands FF or VFF
- Formation: 1 August 1938
- Purpose: District Football Association
- Location(s): Ånghammargatan 4 72133 Västerås Västmanland County Sweden
- Chairman: Birger Jonsson
- Website: vff.se

The Västmanlands Fotbollförbund (Västmanland Football Association) is one of the 24 district organisations of the Swedish Football Association. It administers lower tier and youth football in the eastern half of the historical province of Västmanland, namely Västmanland County.

== Background ==
The Association was founded on 1 August 1938 and currently has 72 member clubs serving 12,000 players and officials. Based in Västerås, the Association's Chairman is Birger Jonsson.

The main goal of VFF is to promote, manage and develop football in Västmanland. The district has produced several notable football players such as Stefan Pettersson, Pontus Kåmark, Gary Sundgren, Peter Markstedt, Fredrik Stenman, Jonny Rödlund, Åsa Jakobsson, Susanne Hedberg and Malin Flink.

== Affiliated members ==
The following clubs are affiliated to the Västmanlands FF:

- Afghanska IF
- Arboga Södra IF
- Aros SK
- Assyriska FC
- Babylon FK
- Bäckby IF
- Barkarö SK
- BK 30 DuFF
- Bosnisk SK
- Dingtuna GIF
- Fagersta Södra IK
- FC Europe Juniors
- FC Sporting Västerås
- Forsby FF
- Gideonsbergs IF
- Götlunda IF
- Grällsta IF
- Hallstahammars SK FK
- Heds IF
- Himmeta IF
- IFK Arboga FK
- IFK Ekberga
- IFK Västerås FK
- IK Franke
- IK Oden
- Irakiska IF
- Irsta IF
- Juventus IF
- Kazakiska Kultur & IF
- KFUM Malmabergs IK Västerås
- Kolsva IF
- Köping FF
- Kungsör BK
- Kurdiska FF
- Kurdiska Sport Klubben
- Los Condores KFF
- Medåkers IF
- Möklinta IF
- Munktorps BK
- Norberg-Högfors FK
- Norrby IK
- Norrby SK
- Orresta IF
- Ramnäs IF
- Ransta IK
- Riddarhytte SK
- Romfartuna GIF
- Rytterne IS
- Sala FF
- Sätra IF
- Skiljebo SK
- Skinnskattebergs SK
- Skultuna IS
- Sörstafors-Kolbäck FK
- Surahammars FK
- Syrianska IF Kerburan
- Tillberga IK Fotboll
- Tortuna SK
- Tuna-Ekeby BK
- Valskogs IK
- Värhulta AIS
- Västanfors IF FK
- Västerås BK 30
- Västerås FK
- Västerås IK
- Västerås SK FK
- Västerås SK Ungdomsfotbollsklubb
- Västerfärnebo AIK
- Virsbo IF
- Wahlsta SK
- Wefors FF
- Önsta BK

== League Competitions ==
Västmanlands FF run the following League Competitions:

=== Men's Football ===
Division 4 - one section
Division 5 - one section
Division 6 - one section
Division 7 - one section
Division 8 - one section

=== Women's Football ===
Division 3 - one section
Division 4 - one section
Division 5 - one section
