= Södermanlands Fotbollförbund =

- Abbreviation: Södermanlands FF
- Formation: 25 March 1917
- Purpose: District Football Association
- Location(s): Rademachergatan 34 63220 Eskilstuna Södermanland County Sweden
- Chairman: Lars Wessman
- Website: http://sodermanland.svenskfotboll.se/

The Södermanlands Fotbollförbund (Södermanland Football Association) is one of the 24 district organisations of the Swedish Football Association. It administers lower tier football in the historical province of Södermanland.

== Background ==
Södermanlands Fotbollförbund, commonly referred to as Södermanlands FF, is the governing body for football in Södermanland County and some municipalities in the southern peripherical part of Stockholm County. The Association was founded on 25 March 1917 and currently has 139 member clubs. Based in Eskilstuna, the Association's Chairman is Lars Wessman.

== Affiliated Members ==
The following clubs are affiliated to the Södermanlands FF:

- AC Primavera
- Al Salam SK
- Al Salam-Eskilstuna SK
- Allkurd KIF
- Aspö IF
- Assyriska FF
- Baggetorps IF
- Barva IF
- Beachhallen BSC
- Betnahrin Kulturcentrum IK
- Bie GOIF
- Bissarna Talang FF
- Björkviks IF
- Björnlunda IF
- BK Sport
- BK Tun
- Borac IK
- Broby-Bettna FC
- Brunnsängs IK
- Buskhyttans SK
- DFK Värmbol
- Dunkers IF
- Ekängens BK
- Enhörna IF
- Enhörna TFF
- Ericsbergs GOIF
- Eskilstuna Babylon IF
- Eskilstuna City FK
- Eskilstuna Södra FF
- Eskilstuna Södra TFF
- Eskilstuna United DFF
- FC Kringlan
- FC Succé
- FF Södertälje
- Flens IF-Södra
- Floda IF
- Fogdö IF
- Gåsinge-Dillnäs IF
- Gillberga-Lista IF
- Gnesta FC 79
- Gnesta FF
- Gnesta TFF
- Gropptorps IF
- Hällbybrunns FF
- Hällbybrunns IF
- Hälleforsnäs IF
- Härad IF
- Hargs BK
- Hargs FC
- Högsjö BK
- Hölö-Mörkö IF
- Homenetmen IF Södertälje
- IF Verdandi
- IFK Eskilstuna
- IFK Mariefred
- IFK Nyköping
- IFK Strängnäs
- IK Standard
- IK Tun
- IK Viljan Strängnäs
- Internationella FC Katrineholm
- Irakona International SC
- Jäders IF
- Järna SK
- Järna SK TFF
- Jönåkers IF
- Julita GoIF
- Kaldeiska Ishtar FF
- Katrineholms AIK
- Katrineholms AIK TFF
- Katrineholms SK FK
- Kvicksunds SK
- Länna GoIF
- Löthens GoIF-Fotboll
- Malma FC
- Malmköpings IF
- Marsjö-Byle GOIF
- Mellösa IF
- Mölnbo IF
- Näsby BK
- Näshulta GOIF
- Nävekvarns GOIF
- New Mill Indians SK
- Nyköpings BIS
- Nykvarns SK
- Nynäs IK
- Ostra IF
- Oxelösunds IK
- Oxelösunds IK Ungdom
- Pershagens SK
- Råby/Rönö IF
- Real Stars FF
- Runtuna IK
- Sjösa IF
- Skogstorps GOIF
- Sköldinge IF
- Slagsta United DFF
- Söder FF
- Södertälje Syriska Förening
- Sparreholms SK
- Stallarholmens SK
- Stenkvista GOIF
- Stigtomta IF
- Stjärnhovs IK
- Stora Sundby GoIF
- Strångsjö AIK
- Syrianska BoIS
- Syrianska Eskilstuna IF
- Syrianska FC
- Team Rosa SK
- Telge FF
- Telge United FF
- Tisnarbro IF
- Torshälla-Nyby IS
- Torshargs BK
- Triangelns FF
- Triangelns IK
- Trosa IF
- Tystberga GIF
- Vadsbro IF
- Vagnhärads SK
- Valla IF
- Värmbols FC
- Värmbols FC TFF
- Västerljungs IF
- Velociped-O IF Diana
- Viljans FF
- Vingåkers IF
- Vingåkers IF TFF
- Vrena IF
- Åkers IF
- Ålberga GIF
- Ärla IF
- Östermalms IS
- Östertelge BOIS
- Österåkers IS

== League Competitions ==
Södermanlands FF run the following League Competitions:

=== Men's Football ===
Division 4 - one section
Division 5 - two sections
Division 6 - four sections
Division 7 - three sections

=== Women's Football ===
Division 3 - one section
Division 4 - one section
Division 5 - two sections
