= Örebro Läns Fotbollförbund =

- Abbreviation: Örebro Läns FF
- Formation: 1938
- Purpose: District Football Association
- Headquarters: Idrottens hus
- Location(s): Karlsgatan 28-30 70015 Örebro Örebro County Sweden
- Chairman: Raul Björk
- Website: http://www.olff.se/

The Örebro Läns Fotbollförbund (Örebro County Football Association) is one of the 24 district organisations of the Swedish Football Association. It administers lower tier football in Örebro County.

== Background ==
Örebro Läns Fotbollförbund, commonly referred to as Örebro Läns FF, was founded in 1938 and is the governing body for football in the county of Örebro. The Association currently has 92 member clubs. Based in Örebro, the Association's Chairman is Raul Björk.

== Affiliated Members ==
The following clubs are affiliated to the Örebro Läns FF:

- Adolfsbergs IK
- Axbergs IF
- BK Forward
- BK Forward/Eyra
- Bobby BK
- Brickebackens IF
- Dalkarlsbergs IF
- Ekeby IF
- Ervalla FF
- Ervalla SK
- FC Assyriska
- FC Höftskott
- FC Irakiska
- Fellingsbro GOIF
- Finnerödja IF
- Fjugesta IF
- FK Bosna 92 Örebro
- FK Örebro
- Frövi IK
- Garphyttans IF
- Glanshammar Fotbolls Förening
- Glanshammars IF
- Grönbo IF
- Grythyttans IF
- Guldsmedsh.-Stråssa BK
- Hagaberg Futsal Club
- Hällefors AIF
- Hallsbergs BK
- Hampetorp-Odensbackens IF
- Hidingsta IK
- Hjortkvarns IF
- Hovsta IF
- IF Eker Örebro
- IFK Askersund
- IFK Hallsberg FK
- IFK Kumla
- IFK Lindesberg
- IFK Örebro
- IK Sturehov
- Integrations IF
- Järnboås IF
- Karlslunds FF
- Karlslunds IF HFK
- KIF Örebro DFF
- KIF Örebro DUFF
- Kilsmo IK
- Kopparberg BK
- Kumla BK
- Latorps IF
- Laxå IF
- Lekebergs IF
- Lilla Örebro BK
- Lillån FK
- Lillkyrka IF
- Lindesbergs FK
- Mariebergs IK
- Mosjö SK
- Mullhyttans IF
- Närkesberg/Mariedamm FF
- Nerikes Kils SK
- Nora IK
- Nora-Pershyttan BK
- Nyckelby IF
- Pålsboda GOIF
- Pars FC Örebro
- Real Örebro FF
- Riksidrottsgymnasiet Örebro Futsal Club
- Röfors IF
- Rynninge IK
- Sannaheds IF
- Simon SK
- Sköllersta IF
- Skyllbergs IK
- Sportakademin Cantolao FK
- SS Kumla
- Ställdalens AIK
- Stene IF
- Stora Mellösa-Åsbyvikens IF
- Svartå IF
- Vivalla Star IF
- Vretstorps IF
- Wedevågs IF
- Yxhults IK
- Zinkgruvans IF
- Åmmebergs IF
- Öfvre Adolfsberg FC
- Örebro SK FK
- Örebro SK Söder
- Örebro SK Ungdomsklubb
- Örebro Syrianska IF
- ÖSK Elitfotboll AB
- Östansjö IF
- Östra Almby FK

== League Competitions ==
Örebro Läns FF run the following League Competitions:

=== Men's Football ===
Division 4 - one section
Division 5 - two sections
Division 6 - two sections
Division 7 - three sections
Division 8 - four sections

=== Women's Football ===
Division 3 - one section
Division 4 - one section
