= Värmlands Fotbollförbund =

- Abbreviation: Värmlands FF or VFF
- Formation: 2 April 1918
- Purpose: District Football Association
- Headquarters: Idrottens Hus
- Location(s): Industrigatan 1 65102 Karlstad Värmland County Sweden
- Chairman: Annelie Larsson
- Website: http://www.varmlandsff.se/

The Värmlands Fotbollförbund (Värmland Football Association) is one of the 24 district organisations of the Swedish Football Association. It administers lower tier football in the historical province of Värmland.

== Background ==
Värmlands Fotbollförbund, commonly referred to as Värmlands FF, is the governing body for football in the historical province of Värmland, which corresponds with Värmland County (plus Karlskoga and Degerfors in Örebro County). The Association was founded on 2 April 1918 and currently has 138 member clubs. Based in Karlstad, the Association's Chairman is Annelie Larsson.

== Affiliated members ==
The following clubs are affiliated to the Värmlands FF:

- Alkvetterns IK
- Arvika Fotboll Supporter Klubb
- Bäckalunds IF
- Bäckhammars SK
- Bergsängs BK
- Bjälveruds IK
- Björneborgs IF
- Blomskogs IF
- Borgviks IF
- Bortans IK
- Bråtens IK
- Bro AIK
- Brunskogs SK
- Carlstad FC
- Degerfors IF
- Degerfors IF Ungdom
- Deje IK
- Eda IF
- Edsvalla IF
- Ekshärads BK
- Eskilsäters IF
- Fagerås BK
- FBK Karlstad
- FC Kristinehamn
- Fensbols IF
- Filipstads FF
- Finnskoga FF
- Fiskeviks IF
- FK QBIK
- Forshaga IF
- Geijersfors AIF
- Gettjärns IF
- Gillberga FF
- Granbergsdals IF
- Gräsmark GoIF
- Grums IK FK
- Gunnarskog IK
- Häljebodas IF
- Hertzöga BK
- Hillringsbergs IF
- Högboda IF
- Holmedals AIS
- IF Brunskog United
- IF Kil
- IF Nyedshov-Lindfors
- IF Örnen
- IFK Ås
- IFK Edebäck-Uddeholm
- IFK Heden
- IFK Kristinehamn
- IFK Kronoparken
- IFK Munkfors
- IFK Ölme
- IFK Skoghall
- IFK Sunne Fotboll
- IFK Väse
- IFK Velen
- IK Arvika Fotboll
- IK Vikings FK
- Immetorp BK
- Innerstadens BK
- IS Emtarna
- Jössefors IK
- Karlanda IF
- Karlskoga SK
- KB Karlskoga FF
- KFUM i Karlstad
- Kila IF
- Kils AIK FK
- Kils BK
- Klässbols SK
- Köla AIK
- Koppoms IK
- Kronans DFK
- Kronans FK
- Kronoparkens FF
- Kronoparkens Skol-IF
- Långseruds IF
- Lesjöfors IF
- Lindfors IF
- Lusaskens FC
- Lysviks IF
- Mallbackens IF
- Mangskog SK
- Nolgårds IK
- Nor IK
- Nordmarks IF
- Nordvärmland FF
- Norra Ny FF
- Norrstrands IF
- Norrstrands Veteraner FF
- Nykroppa AIK
- Olsäters SK
- Orrholmens IF
- Persbergs SK
- QBIK
- Råda IK
- Rännbergs IK
- Råtorps IK
- Rävåsens IK
- Rinns AIK
- Rottneros IK
- Säffle FF
- Segmons IF
- Silleruds IF
- SK Klaran
- SK Sifhälla
- Skattkärrs IF
- Skoghalls FF
- Slottsbrons IF
- Sommarro IF
- Sörby IK
- Storfors FF
- Strömtorps IK
- Sunnemo IF
- Svanskogs IF
- Töcksfors IF
- Torsby IF
- Uddeholms IF
- Ulvsby IF
- Värmlandsbro SK
- Värmskogs SK
- Varnans Vingar IF
- Västanviks AIF
- Villastadens IF
- Vitsands IF
- Woody's FC
- Åmotfors IF
- Årjängs IF
- Åtorps IF
- Älgå SK
- Ämterviks FF
- Ängebäck BK
- Östra Deje IK

== League Competitions ==
Värmlands FF run the following League Competitions:

=== Men's Football ===
Division 4 - one section
Division 5 - two sections
Division 6 - four sections
Division 7 - six sections

=== Women's Football ===
Division 3 - one section
Division 4 - one section
Division 5 - two sections
