= Upplands Fotbollförbund =

Association football district association in Sweden

- Abbreviation: Upplands FF
- Formation: 1 April 1917; 109 years ago
- Headquarters: Idrottens hus
- Location(s): Sportfältsvägen 3 Uppsala Uppsala County Sweden
- Chairman: Johan Richt
- Website: uppland.svenskfotboll.se

The Upplands Fotbollförbund (Uppland Football Association) is one of the 24 district organisations of the Swedish Football Association. It administers lower tier football in the historical province of Uppland.

== Background ==
Upplands Fotbollförbund, commonly referred to as Upplands FF, was founded on 1 April 1917 is the governing body for football in Uppsala County and some municipalities in the northern peripherical part of Stockholm County. The Association currently has 156 member clubs and is based in Uppsala.

== Affiliated Members ==
The following clubs are affiliated to the Upplands FF:

- Almo BK
- Almunge IK
- Alsike IF
- Alunda IF
- Alunda UIF
- Ararat Armenisk IK
- Arlanda FF
- Bälinge IF
- Bålsta FF
- BK Simul
- BKV Norrtälje
- Blidö IF
- Börje SK
- Bro IK
- Brottby SK
- Dalkurd FF
- Danmarks Dam FF
- Danmarks IF
- Edsbro IF
- Enköpings IS
- Enköpings SK FK
- Enköpings SK UK
- Estuna IF
- Fanna BK
- FC Arlanda
- FC BoCity Uppsala
- FF Citykamraterna 05
- Films SK
- Fjärdhundra SK
- Flogsta FC
- Fortitudo FC
- Frösunda SK
- Funbo IF
- Funbo TFF
- Fyris FF
- Gamla Upsala SK
- Gamlis FF
- Gårdskär GoIF
- Gimo IF FK
- Gimo IF Ungdomsklubb
- GoIF Kåre
- Gojo FF
- Gottsunda AIF
- Gräsö IF
- Grisslehamns SK
- Håbo FF
- Håbro IF
- Hagby IK
- Hagunda IF
- Hallsta IK
- Harbo IF
- Harg-Östhammar FF
- Harg-Östhammar FK
- Hargs IK
- Härnevi BK
- Häverödals SK
- Heby AIF
- Heby AIF FF
- Holma FF
- IF Ferro
- IF Stjärnan
- IF Trikadien
- IF Vesta
- IF Vindhemspojkarna Herrfotboll
- IF VP Uppsala
- IFK Dannemora/Österby
- IFK Uppsala
- IFK Uppsala UFF
- IK Apollon
- IK Fyris
- IK Gränby
- IK Hinden
- IK Nordia
- IK Rex
- IK Sirius FK
- Järlåsa IF
- Jumkils IF
- Karlholm UFF
- Karlholms GoIF
- Knarrbacken FC
- Knivsta IK
- Knivsta SK
- Knutby IF
- Kurdiska FC Uppsala
- Kurdiska FF Uppsala
- Lagga- Långhundra BK
- Lagunda AIK
- Lindholmens FC
- Livets Ord IF
- Lohärads IF
- Lokomotiv 06 FF
- Månkarbo IF
- Markim-Orkesta IF
- Marma Mehede IF
- Märsta IK
- Morgongåva SK
- Nordicuzbek FC
- Norrskedika FK
- Norrskedika IF
- Nyby FK
- Procyon BK
- Rådmansö SK
- Rånäs IF
- Rasbo IK
- Riala GoIF
- Rimbo IF
- Rö IK
- Rosersbergs IK
- Roslagsbro IF
- Runhällens BOIS
- Sigtuna IF
- Sirius Fotboll AB
- SK Elvan
- SK Iron
- SK Wigör
- Skånela AIF
- Skepptuna IK
- Skuttunge SK
- Skyttorps IF
- Söderbykarls IF
- Söderfors GoIF
- Södra Trögds IK
- Södra Uppsala SK
- Storvreta IK
- Strömsbergs IF
- Sunnersta AIF
- Tärnsjö IF
- Tierps DFF
- Tierps IF
- Tifen FF
- Tobo/Örbyhus FF
- Torpedo Kamrat BK
- Ullfors IK
- Unik FK
- Upplands-Ekeby IF
- Uppsala City FC
- Uppsala FC
- Uppsala Inter FC
- Uppsala United FC
- Uppsala-Kurd FK
- Upsala IF
- Upsala IF FF
- Väddö IF
- Vaksala FF
- Vaksala SK
- Valsta Syrianska IK
- Vangen FBC
- Vassunda IF
- Vätö IK
- Vattholma IF
- Viksta IK
- Vittinge IK
- Åsunda IF
- Älvkarleby IK
- Ärentuna SK
- Österlövsta FF
- Östervåla IF
- Östhammars SK

== League Competitions ==
Upplands FF run the following League Competitions:

=== Men's Football ===
Division 4 - one section
Division 5 - two sections
Division 6 - four sections
Division 7 - four sections
Division 8 - four sections

=== Women's Football ===
Division 3 - one section
Division 4 - two sections
Division 5 - three sections
