= Västerbottens Fotbollförbund =

Association football district association in Sweden

- Abbreviation: Västerbottens FF
- Formation: 16 March 1924
- Purpose: District Football Association
- Headquarters: Idrottens Hus, 1tr
- Location(s): Mullbergsvägen 11 B 93137 Skellefteå Västerbotten County Sweden
- Chairman: Magnus Stenberg
- Website: vasterbotten.svenskfotboll.se

The Västerbottens Fotbollförbund (Västerbotten Football Association) is one of the 24 district organisations of the Swedish Football Association. It administers lower tier football in Västerbotten County.

== Background ==
Västerbottens Fotbollförbund, commonly referred to as Västerbottens FF, is the governing body for football in the historical province of Västerbotten, which largely corresponds with present day Västerbotten County. The Association was founded on 16 March 1924 and currently has 135 member clubs. Based in Skellefteå, the Association's Chairman is Magnus Stenberg.

== Affiliated Members ==
The following clubs are affiliated to the Västerbottens FF:

- Adak SK
- Bastuträsk SK
- Bergsbyns SK
- Betsele FF
- Betsele IF
- Bjurholms IF
- BK Nila
- BK Solbacken
- Blattnicksele IF
- Blåviksjöns IF
- Bolidens FFI
- Bureå IF
- Burträsk FF
- Burträsk IK
- Burträsk Ungdomsfotboll BK
- Bygdeå GOIF
- Bygdsiljums SK
- Byske IF
- Clemensnäs IF
- Dorotea BK
- Dorotea IF
- Drängsmark/Ostvik IF
- Ersboda FF
- Ersboda SK
- Ersmarks IK
- Falmarks Fritids O IK
- FC Mary's Home
- Flarkens IK
- Flurkmarks IK
- Fromhedens IF
- Furunäs/Bullmarks IK
- Gimonäs Umeå IF
- Gräsmyrs IK
- Gunnarns IK
- Hås FF
- Hissjö SK
- Hissjö/ Tavelsjö/ Flurkmark AIK
- Hjoggböle IF
- Hjoggsjö IF
- Höglands AIK
- Höjdens BK
- Hörnefors IF
- Hörnsjö IF
- IFK Åkullsjön
- IFK Ålund
- IFK Anderstorp-Skellefteå
- IFK Bjurfors
- IFK Holmsund
- IFK Kristineberg
- IFK Rundvik
- IFK Umeå
- IK Klintarna
- Innervik SK
- Jörns IF
- Kågedalens AIF
- Klutmarks IF
- Kusfors IK
- Lilljansberget IF
- Ljusvattnets IF
- Lövånger-Uttersjöbäcken AIK
- Lycksele FF
- Lycksele IF
- Malå IF
- Malgoviks GOIF
- Mariehem SK
- Medle SK
- Minerva IF
- Mjödvattnets IF
- Mjövallens BK
- Morön BK
- Morön City BK
- Myckle IK
- Nordmalings BK
- Norrlångträsk IK
- Norsjö IF
- Norum-Djäkneboda SK
- Nysätra IF
- Obbola IK
- Ormsjö IF
- Ostvik/Drängsmark IK
- Ragvaldsträsk IF
- Renbergsvattnets IF
- Risliden/Lossmens SK
- Röbäcks IF
- Robertsfors BK
- Robertsfors IK
- Rödåbygdens IK
- Rönnskär Railcare IF
- Rusksele FF
- Sandåkerns SK
- Sandsele SK
- Sandviks IK
- Sävar IK
- Sjöbottens FF
- SK Örnvingen
- SK Storm
- Skellefteå Fotbollsförening
- Slipstensjöns IF
- Södra Ungdom FF
- Sörböle FF
- Sörfors IF
- Sörmjöle IK
- Sorsele IF
- Spöland Vännäs IF
- Stämningsgården IK
- Stöcke IF
- Storumans IK
- Sunnanå SK
- Svanaby IF
- Täfteå IK
- Tärnafjällens IF
- Tavelsjö Allmänna IK
- Tegs SK
- Tegs United FF
- Tvärålunds IF
- Umeå FC
- Umeå IK
- Umeå Södra FF
- Umedalens IF
- Umekamraternas FF
- Umgransele Byaförening
- Vallens IS
- Vännäs AIK
- Vännäs AIK DFF
- Varuträsk IF
- Vebomarks IF
- Vilhelmina IK
- Vindelns IF
- Åbyns IF
- Åmlidens IF
- Åmsele SK
- Åsele IK

== League Competitions ==
Västerbottens FF run the following League Competitions:

=== Men's Football ===
Division 4 - two sections
Division 5 - three sections
Division 6 - four sections

=== Women's Football ===
Division 3 - one section
Division 4 - three sections
