= Ångermanlands Fotbollförbund =

Association football district association in Sweden

- Abbreviation: Ångermanlands FF
- Formation: 1 July 1933
- Purpose: District Football Association
- Headquarters: Fabriksgatan 12
- Location(s): 891 35 Örnsköldsvik; Västernorrland County; Sweden
- Chairman: Lars Olof Wengelin
- Website: http://angermanland.svenskfotboll.se/

The Ångermanlands Fotbollförbund (Ångermanland Football Association) is one of the 24 district organisations of the Swedish Football Association. It administers lower tier football in the historic province of Ångermanland.

It was established on 1 July 1933, when Västernorrland County Football Association was disbanded, and split into the Ångermanland Football Association and the Medelpad Ångermanland Football Association.

== Background ==
Ångermanlands Fotbollförbund, commonly referred to as Ångermanlands FF, is the governing body for football in the historic province of Ångermanland, which roughly corresponds with the county of Västernorrland. The Association currently has 55 member clubs. Based in Örnsköldsvik, the Association's Chairman is Lars Olof Wengelin.

== Affiliated Members ==
The following clubs are affiliated to the Ångermanlands FF:

- Anundsjö IF
- Arnäs IF
- Bik Sportklubb
- Billsta IF
- Bjärtrå IS
- Björna IF
- BK Örnen Örnsköldsvik
- Bollsta IK
- Djuptjärns IK
- Docksta BTK
- Domsjö IF
- Edsele AIK
- Forsmo IF
- Frånö SK
- Friska Viljor Akademi FC
- Friska Viljor FC
- Gideå IK
- Gottne IF
- Graninge FF
- Hägglunds IoFK
- Härnösands AIK
- Härnösands FC United
- Härnösands SK
- Holmstrand-Helgums SK
- Husums IF FK
- IFK Nyland
- Junsele IF
- Köpmanholmen-Bjästa IF
- Kramfors-Alliansen
- Kubbe-Norrflärke IF
- Långsele AIF
- Mellansel IF
- Modo FF
- Moelvens FC
- Moffe BK
- Molidens IK
- Myckelgensjö IF
- Nätra GIF
- Norabygdens IK
- Nordingrå SK
- Ramsele IK
- Ramviks IF
- Remsle UIF FF
- Resele IF
- Salsåker-Ullångers IF
- Sidensjö IK
- Själevads IK
- Skorpeds SK
- Sollefteå GIF FF
- Stigsjö IK
- Svedje IF
- Trehörningsjö IF
- Ådalslidens SK
- Älandsbro AIK
- Älgarna-Härnösands FF

== League Competitions ==
Ångermanlands FF run the following League Competitions:

=== Men's Football ===
Division 4 - one section
Division 5 - one section
Division 6 - two sections

=== Women's Football ===
Division 3 - one section
