= Stockholms Fotbollförbund =

District organisations of the Swedish Football Association

- Abbreviation: Stockholms FF
- Formation: 29 March 1917
- Purpose: District Football Association
- Location(s): Västra vägen 5A 17126 Solna Stockholm Sweden
- Chairman: Lars Ekholmer
- Website: www.stff.se

The Stockholms Fotbollförbund (lit. 'Stockholm Football Association'; StFF) is one of the 24 district organisations of the Swedish Football Association. It administers lower tier football in Stockholm County.

== Background ==
Stockholms Fotbollförbund is the governing body for football in Stockholm County (except some peripheral municipalities). The association was founded on 29 March 1917 when 49 teams registered with the organisation. In the last decade the number of senior clubs has been well over 500 clubs. There are currently 450 member clubs. Based in Solna, Stockholm, the Association's chairman is Sune Jerry Reinhold.

There are now about 60,000 active players participating in Stockholm football, this is about 24 percent of the total number of sports activities in the district. In 2005, for example, there were around 30,363 registered players (24,028 men and 6,335 women participants). To this can be added 30,000 young adolescents who take part in the S:t Eriks Cupen. The organisation has expressed goals of promoting youth fitness and social development.

== Swedish Football Association grant scandal ==
In 2024, a financial scandal emerged involving the Swedish Football Association and the StFF, where millions of Swedish kronor were allegedly obtained through fraudulent invoices and misappropriated grants intended for youth football development. An internal audit revealed suspicious financial activities dating back to 2021, involving fabricated invoices and fictitious projects. The Swedish Sports Confederation and the City of Stockholm launched investigations into the misuse of public funds, and at least one individual formerly affiliated with the Stockholm Football Association was reported to the police. The incident has led to calls for increased financial oversight and transparency within Swedish football organizations.

== Affiliated members ==
As of 14 September 2023

=== Botkyrka Municipality ===
Affiliated members of StFF based in Botkyrka Municipality.

- Arameisk-Syrianska IF
- Assyriska Botkyrka FF
- Assyriska KF Botkyrka
- Botkyrka Academy FC
- Botkyrka Kuluspor FF
- Botkyrkakurd FF
- Colo-Colo International FK
- FC Druzja
- Fittja IF
- Grödinge SK
- Hallunda IF
- IFK Tumba FK
- Konyaspor Kultur och IF
- Los Copihues IF
- Marockanska FC
- Midyat Edessa SK
- Nackdala AIS
- Norsborg FC
- Norsborgs FF
- Norsborgs IF
- Stockholm Södra FF
- Tullinge BK
- Tullinge FF
- Tullinge Triangel Pojkar FK

=== Danderyd Municipality ===
Affiliated members of StFF based in Danderyd Municipality.

- Danderyds SK FF
- Danderyds United FC
- Enebybergs IF
- FC Djursholm
- IFK Stocksund
- Stocksunds IF

=== Ekerö Municipality ===
Affiliated members of StFF based in Ekerö Municipality.

- Ekerö IK
- Munsö IF
- Skå IK & Bygdegård

=== Haninge Municipality ===
Affiliated members of StFF based in Haninge Municipality.

- Dalarö SK
- FC Brandbergen
- Haninge IF
- IFK Haninge
- Lion Academy FC
- Söderort United FF
- Tungelsta IF
- Vega FC
- Vendelsö IK
- Västerhaninge IF

=== Huddinge Municipality ===
Affiliated members of StFF based in Huddinge Municipality.

- BK Fyren Ungdomsfotboll
- BK Gömmaren
- Dardania Stockholm FF
- FC Balingsnäs
- FC Croatia Stockholm
- Fullersta FK
- Huddinge IF
- Segeltorps IF
- Skogås-Trångsunds FF
- Stockholm Athletic FF
- Stuvsta FF
- Stuvsta IF
- Sörskogens IF
- Viña del Mar IF
- Vistaberg IF
- Vårby Gårds IF

=== Järfälla Municipality ===
Affiliated members of StFF based in Järfälla Municipality.

- Afghanska FF
- Athletic FC Järfälla
- Bele Barkarby FF
- Edessa Syrianska KIF
- FC Jakobsberg
- FC Järfälla
- IF Wasa
- IFK Viksjö
- IK Säbysjön
- Järfälla FF
- Kallhälls FF

=== Lidingö Municipality ===
Affiliated members of StFF based in Lidingö Municipality.

- IFK Lidingö BK
- IFK Lidingö FC
- IFK Lidingö FK
- Lidingö Gazoliners FC
- Lidingö SK
- Ljungbackens IF

=== Nacka Municipality ===
Affiliated members of StFF based in Nacka Municipality.

- Boo FF
- Boo FK
- Boo SK
- Espanyol Academy IF
- FC Boo
- Fisksätra IF
- Fisksätra United IF
- Henriksdalsberget FF
- Jarlabergs IF
- Järla IF FK
- Kvarnholmen FK
- Los Ché IF
- Nacka Allstars DFF
- Nacka FC
- Nacka United FF
- Saltsjöbadens IF
- Saltsjö-Boo IF
- Sickla IF
- Älta IF

=== Nynäshamn Municipality ===
Affiliated members of StFF based in Nynäshamn Municipality.

- FC Första
- FC Första FK
- Nynäshamns IF FK
- Sorunda IF
- Ösmo GIF FK

=== Salem Municipality ===
Affiliated members of StFF based in Salem Municipality.

- FC Rönninge
- Rönninge Salem Fotboll

=== Sollentuna Municipality ===
Affiliated members of StFF based in Sollentuna Municipality.

- Alianza IF
- Edsviken FoSF
- FC Milano Stockholm
- FC Rotebro
- IFK Sollentuna
- Maj FC
- Rotebro IS FF
- Sollentuna FK
- Sollentuna Utveckling FK
- Stockholm Cranes IF
- Turebergs IF

=== Solna Municipality ===
Affiliated members of StFF based in Sollentuna Municipality.

- AIK FF
- AIK Framtid FK
- Apollon Solna FK
- AS Solna FF
- FC Järvastaden
- FC Plavi Team Stockholm
- Hagalunds IS
- Huvudsta Dragonz IF
- IFK Bergshamra
- Newroz FC AB
- Råsunda FC
- Råsunda IS
- Solna FC
- Stockholm Universitets FF
- Vasalunds IF

=== Stockholm Municipality ===
Affiliated members of StFF based in Stockholm Municipality.

- A C Camelen
- AC Azzurri
- AC Farsta
- AIF Kista
- AIK Fotboll AB
- AK Stockholmsatleterna
- Albion FC
- Alborz IF
- All Stars FF
- All Stripes SC
- Alvik FC
- Argentinska Stockholm IF
- Artemis IF
- Aspuddens FF
- Assyriska FF Babylon
- Athletic FC Malmen
- Athletic Blåsut FC
- Bagarmossen Kärrtorp BK
- Bagis Ultras BK
- Banjul FC
- Bellevue United FC
- Bemannia FC Stockholm
- BK Borsten
- BK Buffalo
- BK Fyren
- BK Gamla Karlbergare
- BK Hammarby
- BK Hufvudstad
- BK Träsket
- BK Yardies
- Bondegatans Bajare FF
- Bromma TFF
- Brommapojkarna DFF
- Bromstens IK
- Camdja IKF
- Cassi FF
- Djurgårdens Elitfotboll AB
- Djurgårdens IF FF
- Djurgårdens Talangfotbollsförening
- Enskede FF
- Enskede IK
- Enskede United FC
- Eritreanska Sportförening
- Essinge IK
- FC Atletico Stockholm
- FC Bakoteh
- FC Baloch
- FC Björnligan
- FC Krukan
- FC Sampierdarenese
- FC Stockholm Internazionale
- FC Stockholm Internazionale AB
- FC Söder
- FC Thebe
- FC Tolkarna
- FK Bosna 08
- FK Bromma
- FK Ekipa
- FK Semper Fidelis
- Flemingsberg IF
- Flemingsnerg United FC
- FoC Farsta FF
- Fryshuset IF
- Futsal Club Bosna
- Gamla Skanstull BK
- Gimonäs FC
- Grimsta FC
- Gröndal IK
- Göta Traneberg IK
- Hammarby Fotboll AB
- Hammarby IF FF
- Handelskamraternas IS
- Husby FF
- Hägersten FC Stockholm
- Hässelby SK FF
- Högalids IF
- Högdalens AIS
- Iberoamericana IF
- IF Atletico Camelen
- IF Brommapojkarna
- IF Lokomotiv Blackeberg
- IF Olympia
- IF Stockholms Fotbollsakademi
- IF Söderkamraterna
- IFK Aspudden-Tellus
- IFK Stockholm FK
- IK Makkabi
- IK Sture
- Järva IF
- Karlbergs BK
- KIF Söderort
- KIF Söderort FF
- Kilimanjaro FF
- Kista SC KFUM
- Kofkella Kultur o IF
- Konglig Samhällsbyggnadssektion FC
- Korpen Stockholms Motionsidrottsförening
- Kransens United FF
- Kronobergs BK
- kulturelitens FF
- Kungsholmens Folkfotbollsförening
- Kälvesta IoF
- Lado Sur FC
- Latino America KIF
- Lindhagen FF
- Långbro FF
- Långholmen FC
- Mariebergs SK
- Mespotamien FC
- Mälarhöjden-Hägersten FF
- Mälarhöjdens IK Fotboll
- Newroz FC
- Nockebyhovs IF
- Norrtull SK
- Olympia Stockholm FF
- Oranje FK
- Orient Sport Förening
- Oroma Stockholm IK
- Polonia Falcons FF
- Preben BoIS
- Qaran IKF
- Reymersholm FF
- Reymersholm IK
- Rinkeby United FC
- Rågsveds IF
- Sangre Chilena FK
- Sauce IKF
- Skarpnäck FF
- Sköndals IK FK
- Sol Union FF
- Solberga BK
- Som United Fotbollsförening
- Spånga IS FF
- Spånga IS FK
- Spårvägens FF
- Srbija FF
- Stadshagens IF
- Stockholm Craft BC
- Stockholm Framefotboll IF
- Stockholm Caels IF
- Stockholm StreetSoccer FF
- Stockholm United FF
- Stockholms-Postens IK
- Stureby FF
- Stureby SK
- SuS IF
- Svensk-Palestinska FF
- Sätra SK
- Söder Futsalklubb
- Söder United FC
- Söderorts IF
- Södra Juniors FC
- Tallkrogens IF
- Tantolundens Beachsoccer Club
- Tekniska Högskolan FC
- Toofan Skärholmen FF
- Top FC
- Tudor Arms FC
- Uruguayanska FF
- Vasalund Stadshagens IF
- Vasalund Stockholm IF
- Vasastans BK
- West City FC
- Westermalms IF FK
- Wollmars FF
- Vällingby AIK
- Värtans IK
- Yenaris FF
- Åkermyntan IF
- Åkeshovs Idrott och FK
- Årsta FF
- Älvsjö AIK DFF
- Älvsjö AIK FF
- Ängby IF
- Örby IS
- Örnarna IF
- Örnsbronx FF
- Östberga City FC

=== Sundbyberg Municipality ===
Affiliated members of StFF based in Sundbyberg Municipality.

- AC Sundbyberg
- Framsteg United FF
- Olympique Rissne FC
- Rissne IF
- Stockholm Folks FK
- Storskogens SK
- Sundbyberg FC
- Sundbybergs IK
- Ursvik IK

=== Tyresö Municipality ===
Affiliated members of StFF based in Tyresö Municipality.

- Bollmora Internacional IKF
- FC Tyresö United
- Hanvikens SK
- Tyresö FF
- Tyresö Strand FC

=== Täby Municipality ===
Affiliated members of StFF based in Täby Municipality.

- Dynamo Täby FC
- Erikslunds KF
- FC Arninge
- Hammarby TFF Herrfotboll
- IK Frej Talangfotbollsförening
- IK Frej Täby FF
- Täby FK
- Täby United FC
- Uniting Täby IF
- Viggbyholms IK FF

=== Upplands Väsby Municipality ===
Affiliated members of StFF based in Upplands Väsby Municipality.

- Bollstanäs SK
- Bredden FC
- FC Väsby Akademiska
- Föreningen Svenska Österbotten
- Parsian IF
- Runby IF
- RödaMarkerna IF
- Wäsby FC
- Väsby FF
- Väsby Futsal IK
- Väsby IK HK

=== Upplands-Bro Municipality ===
Affiliated members of StFF based in Upplands-Bro Municipality.

- Bro IK
- Kungsängens IF
- Somaliska KoIF
- Upplands-Bro United FK

=== Vallentuna Municipality ===
Affiliated members of StFF based in Vallentuna Municipality.

- Bällsta FF
- Vallentuna BK
- Vallentuna BK DF
- Vallentuna Futsal Club

=== Vaxholm Municipality ===
Affiliated members of StFF based in Vaxholm Municipality.

- IFK Vaxholm
- Waxholm FF
- Vaxö AIF

=== Värmdö Municipality ===
Affiliated members of StFF based in Värmdö Municipality.

- BK Bleket
- Djurö-Vindö IF
- Gustavsbergs IF FK
- Ingarö City FK
- Ingarö IF
- Mörtnäs IF
- Värmdö IF

=== Österåker Municipality ===
Affiliated members of StFF based in Österåker Municipality.

- Ljusterö IS
- Roslags-Kulla IF
- Rydbo IF
- Viginti Quattuor FC
- Åkersberga FC
- Österåker United BK
- Österåker United FK

== League competitions ==
StFF run the following league competitions:

=== Men's Football ===
Division 4 – three sections
Division 5 – three sections
Division 6 – six sections
Division 7 – twelve sections

=== Women's Football ===
Division 3 – two sections
Division 4 – two sections
Division 5 – three sections
