= Swedish football district associations =

Local governing bodies of association football in Sweden

The Swedish football district associations are the local governing bodies of association football in Sweden. District FAs exist to govern all aspects of local football within their defined areas, providing grassroots support to the Swedish Football Association by promoting and administering football, futsal, and beach soccer in their respective districts.

Most of the 24 District FAs align roughly with the boundaries of the historic Provinces of Sweden. However, Stockholm FA and Gothenburg FA cover the two major cities and their immediate conurbations. The District FAs administer youth football and the lower-tier leagues from Division 4 (men) and Division 3 (women), respectively, and further below.

== Organisations ==
The 24 district organisations are as follows:

- Blekinge Fotbollförbund
- Bohusläns Fotbollförbund
- Dalarnas Fotbollförbund
- Dalslands Fotbollförbund
- Gestriklands Fotbollförbund
- Gotlands Fotbollförbund
- Göteborgs Fotbollförbund
- Hallands Fotbollförbund
- Hälsinglands Fotbollförbund
- Jämtland-Härjedalens Fotbollförbund
- Medelpads Fotbollförbund
- Norrbottens Fotbollförbund
- Skånes Fotbollförbund
- Smålands Fotbollförbund
- Södermanlands Fotbollförbund
- Stockholms Fotbollförbund
- Upplands Fotbollförbund
- Värmlands Fotbollförbund
- Västerbottens Fotbollförbund
- Västergötlands Fotbollförbund
- Västmanlands Fotbollförbund
- Ångermanlands Fotbollförbund
- Örebro Läns Fotbollförbund
- Östergötlands Fotbollförbund
