= List of women's football clubs in Sweden =

This is a list of women's football clubs in Sweden. For men's football clubs, see the list of football clubs in Sweden.

== By league ==
- Damallsvenskan
- Elitettan

== Alphabetically ==
=== A ===
- AIK
- Alviks IK

=== B ===
- Bälinge IF
- Bollstanäs SK

=== D ===
- Dalsjöfors GoIF
- Djurgårdens IF

=== E ===
- Eskilstuna United DFF
- Essinge IK

=== F ===
- Falköpings Kvinnliga IK
- Falu BS
- FOC Farsta

=== G ===
- Gideonsbergs IF

=== H ===
- Hammarby IF
- Holmalunds IF
- Husie IF

=== J ===
- Jitex BK

=== K ===
- IFK Kalmar
- Kopparbergs/Göteborg FC
- Kristianstads DFF

=== L ===
- Linköpings FC

=== M ===
- Mallbackens IF

=== N ===
- IF Norvalla

=== O ===
- KIF Örebro
- Ornäs BK
- Östers IF
- Östervåla IF

=== Q ===
- QBIK

=== R ===
- FC Rosengård

=== S ===
- Sils IF
- Själevads IK
- Staffanstorps GIF
- Stattena IF
- Sundsvalls DFF
- Sunnanå SK

=== T ===
- Tyresö FF

=== U ===
- Umeå IK
- Umeå Södra FF

=== V ===
- Vasalund/Essinge IF
