= Division 7 (Swedish football) =

Swedish Division 7
- Country: Sweden
- Other club from: Finland
- Divisions: 47 (9–12 teams in each)
- Level on pyramid: 9
- Promotion to: Division 6
- Relegation to: Division 8

Division 7 is the ninth level in the league system of Swedish football and comprises 47 sections with 9 to 12 football teams in each.

== The competition ==
There are 47 groups of 10 to 12 teams each representing a local geographical area. During the course of a season (starting in April and ending in October) each club plays the others twice, once at their home ground and once at that of their opponents, for a total of 18 to 22 games depending on the number of teams. The top team in each Division 7 group is promoted to Division 6 and the second placed teams may also be promoted or participate in the promotion/relegation play-offs. If there are divisions covering tier 10 the bottom two teams in the Division 7 group are relegated to Division 8.

== Administration ==
The District Football Associations are responsible for the administration of Division 7. The Swedish Football Association is responsible for the administration of Division 3 and the higher tiers of the Swedish football league system.
