= Swedish football league system =

Football league systems in Europe

The Swedish football league system is a series of interconnected leagues for club football in Sweden which is controlled by the Swedish Football Association and consists of 288 teams in 22 leagues divided into five levels. Below those five levels, additional regional levels numbered six to ten exist but these lower leagues are controlled by the regional associations and not by the nationwide association. There is, however, promotion and relegation to and from all levels. As of 2013, there were a total of 2510 teams in the Swedish league system of which 299 of them were reserve teams.

== Current system in men's football ==
The table below shows how the current system works. For each division, its Swedish name and number of clubs is given. It is not certain that each division is a feeder of teams to the division that lie directly above it and relegates teams to the divisions that lie directly below it, even though this usually is the case.

Level	Total Clubs (2369+-)	League(s)/Division(s)											
1	16	Allsvenskan; 16 clubs 2+1 relegations											
2	16	Superettan; 16 clubs 2+1 promotions 2+2 relegations											
3	32	Ettan Norra; 16 clubs 1+1 promotions 3+1 relegations						Ettan Södra; 16 clubs 1+1 promotions 3+1 relegations					
4	84	Division 2 Norrland; 14 clubs 1+1 promotion 2+1 relegations		Division 2 Norra Svealand; 14 clubs 1+1 promotion 2+1 relegations		Division 2 Södra Svealand; 14 clubs 1+1 promotion 2+1 relegations		Division 2 Norra Götaland; 14 clubs 1+1 promotion 2+1 relegations		Division 2 Västra Götaland; 14 clubs 1+1 promotion 2+1 relegations		Division 2 Södra Götaland; 14 clubs 1+1 promotion 2+1 relegations	
5	144	Division 3 Norra Norrland; 12 clubs 1+1 promotions 3+1 relegations	Division 3 Mellersta Norrland; 12 clubs 1+1 promotions 3+1 relegations	Division 3 Södra Norrland; 12 clubs 1+1 promotions 3+1 relegations	Division 3 Norra Svealand; 12 clubs 1+1 promotions 3+1 relegations	Division 3 Östra Svealand; 12 clubs 1+1 promotions 3+1 relegations	Division 3 Mellersta Svealand; 12 clubs 1+1 promotions 3+1 relegations	Division 3 Nordöstra Götaland; 12 clubs 1+1 promotions 3+1 relegations	Division 3 Nordvästra Götaland; 12 clubs 1+1 promotions 3+1 relegations	Division 3 Mellersta Götaland; 12 clubs 1+1 promotions 3+1 relegations	Division 3 Sydöstra Götaland; 12 clubs 1+1 promotions 3+1 relegations	Division 3 Sydvästra Götaland; 12 clubs 1+1 promotions 3+1 relegations	Division 3 Södra Götaland; 12 clubs 1+1 promotions 3+1 relegations
6	402	Division 4 Dalarnas FF Division 4 – 12 clubs Gestriklands FF Division 4 – 12 clubs Hälsinglands FF Division 4 – 12 clubs Jämtland-Härjedalens FF Division 4 – 11 clubs Medelpads FF Division 4 – 12 clubs Norrbottens FF Division 4 – 20 clubs (in 2 sections); Stockholms FF Division 4 – 36 clubs (in 3 sections); Södermanlands FF Division 4 – 12 clubs Upplands FF Division 4 – 12 clubs Värmlands FF Division 4 – 12 clubs Västerbottens FF Division 4 – 21 clubs (in 2 sections); Västmanlands FF Division 4 – 12 clubs Ångermanlands FF Division 4 – 12 clubs Örebro Läns FF Division 4 – 12 clubs						Division 4 Blekinge FF Division 4 – 13 clubs Bohusläns FF / Dalslands FF Division 4 – 12 clubs Gotlands FF Division 4 – 10 clubs Göteborgs FF Division 4 – 24 clubs (in 2 sections); Hallands FF Division 4 – 12 clubs Skånes FF Division 4 – 36 clubs (in 3 sections); Smålands FF Division 4 – 48 clubs (in 4 sections); Västergötlands FF Division 4 – 24 clubs (in 2 sections); Östergötlands FF Division 4 – 24 clubs (in 2 sections)					
7	543	Division 5 Dalarnas FF Division 5 – 10 clubs Gestriklands FF Division 5 – 12 clubs Hälsinglands FF Division 5 – 12 clubs Jämtland-Härjedalens FF Division 5 – 11 clubs Medelpads FF Division 5 – 16 clubs Norrbottens FF Division 5 – 28 clubs (in 3 sections); Stockholms FF Division 5 – 36 clubs (in 3 sections); Södermanlands FF Division 5 – 20 clubs (in 2 sections); Upplands FF Division 5 – 24 clubs (in 2 sections); Värmlands FF Division 5 – 24 clubs (in 2 sections); Västerbottens FF Division 5 – 23 clubs (in 2 sections); Västmanlands FF Division 5 – 11 clubs Ångermanlands FF Division 5 – 10 clubs Örebro Läns FF Division 5 – 20 clubs (in 2 sections)						Division 5 Blekinge FF Division 5 – 12 clubs Bohusläns FF Division 5 – 12 clubs Dalslands FF Division 5 – 9 clubs Gotlands FF Division 5 – 12 clubs Göteborgs FF Division 5 – 24 clubs (in 2 sections); Hallands FF Division 5 – 12 clubs Skånes FF Division 5 – 72 clubs (in 6 sections); Smålands FF Division 5 – 48 clubs (in 4 sections); Västergötlands FF Division 5 – 48 clubs (in 4 sections); Östergötlands FF Division 5 – 37 clubs (in 3 sections)					
8	726	Division 6 Dalarnas FF Division 6 – 19 clubs (in 2 sections); Gestriklands FF Division 6 – 11 clubs Hälsinglands FF Division 6 – 19 clubs (in 2 sections); Jämtland-Härjedalens FF Division 6 – 9 clubs Stockholms FF Division 6 – 51 clubs (in 6 sections); Södermanlands FF Division 6 – 39 clubs (in 4 sections); Upplands FF Division 6 – 38 clubs (in 4 sections); Värmlands FF Division 6 – 39 clubs (in 4 sections); Västerbottens FF Division 6 – 27 clubs (in 4 sections); Västmanlands FF Division 6 – 10 clubs Ångermanlands FF Division 6 – 10 clubs Örebro Läns FF Division 6 – 27 clubs (in 3 sections)						Division 6 Blekinge FF Division 6 – 17 clubs (in 2 sections); Bohusläns FF Division 6 – 19 clubs (in 2 sections); Dalslands FF Division 6 – 8 clubs Gotlands FF Division 6 – 10 clubs Göteborgs FF Division 6 – 46 clubs (in 4 sections); Hallands FF Division 6 – 24 clubs (in 2 sections); Skånes FF Division 6 – 92 clubs (in 8 sections); Smålands FF Division 6 – 71 clubs (in 6 sections); Västergötlands FF Division 6 – 101 clubs (in 9 sections); Östergötlands FF Division 6 – 39 clubs (in 4 sections)					
9	534	Division 7 Dalarnas FF Division 7 – 31 clubs (in 4 sections); Gestriklands FF Division 7 – 12 clubs Hälsinglands FF Division 7 – 6 clubs Stockholms FF Division 7 – 106 clubs (in 12 sections); Södermanlands FF Division 7 – 26 clubs (in 3 sections); Upplands FF Division 7 – 37 clubs (in 4 sections); Värmlands FF Division 7 – 47 clubs (in 5 sections); Västmanlands FF Division 7 – 12 clubs (in 2 sections); Örebro Läns FF Division 7 – 18 clubs (in 3 sections)						Division 7 Bohusläns FF Division 7 – 13 clubs (in 2 sections) Dalslands FF Division 7 – 6 clubs Göteborgs FF Division 7 – 36 clubs (in 4 sections) Hallands FF Division 7 – 29 clubs (in 3 sections) Skånes FF Division 7 – 57 clubs (in 6 sections); Smålands FF Division 7 – 98 clubs (in 10 sections)					
10	22	Division 8 Upplands FF Division 8 – 22 clubs (in 2 sections)											

== Current system in women's football ==
In 2013 the two second tier divisions were combined in the new Elitettan.

Level	League(s)/Division(s)
1	Damallsvenskan; 14 clubs
2	Elitettan; 14 clubs
3–8	Swedish Women's Football Division 1-6 several divisions
