= Division 6 (Swedish football) =

Swedish Division 6
- Country: Sweden
- Other club from: Finland
- Divisions: 78 (5–12 teams in each)
- Level on pyramid: 8
- Promotion to: Division 5
- Relegation to: Division 7

Division 6 (Amateur league) is the eighth (by sponsorship) level in the league system of Swedish football and comprises 78 sections with 5 to 12 football teams in each.

== The competition ==
There are 100 groups of 15 to 17 teams each representing a local geographical area. During the course of a season (starting in April and ending in October) each club plays the others twice, once at their home ground and once at that of their opponents, for a total of 18 to 22 games depending on the number of teams. The top team in each Division 6 group is promoted to Division 5. The bottom two teams in each Division 6 group are normally relegated to Division 7.

== Administration ==
The District Football Associations are responsible for the administration of Division 6. The Swedish Football Association is responsible for the administration of Division 3 and the higher tiers of the Swedish football league system.
