= Division 5 (Swedish football) =

Swedish Division 5
- Country: Sweden
- Divisions: 47
- Level on pyramid: 7
- Promotion to: Division 4
- Relegation to: Division 6

Division 5 is the seventh level in the league system of Swedish football and comprises 47 sections with 9 to 16 football teams in each.

== The competition ==
There are 47 groups of 9 to 16 teams each representing a local geographical area. During the course of a season (starting in April and ending in October) each club plays the others twice, once at their home ground and once at that of their opponents, for a total of 18 to 22 games depending on the number of teams. The top team in each Division 5 group is promoted to Division 4 and the second placed teams may also be promoted or participate in the promotion/relegation play-offs. The bottom two teams in each Division 5 group are normally relegated to Division 6.

== Administration ==
The District Football Associations are responsible for the administration of Division 5. The Swedish Football Association is responsible for the administration of Division 3 and the higher tiers of the Swedish football league system.
