= Division 4 (Swedish football) =

Sixth level in the league system of Swedish football

Swedish Division 4
- Country: Sweden
- Divisions: 39 (8–12 teams in each)
- Level on pyramid: 6
- Promotion to: Division 3
- Relegation to: Division 5

Division 4 is the sixth level in the league system of Swedish football and comprises 39 sections with 8 to 12 football teams in each.

== The competition ==
There are 39 groups of 8 to 12 teams each representing a local geographical area. During the course of a season (starting in April and ending in October), each club plays the others twice, once at their home stadium and once at that of their opponents, for a total of 18 to 22 games depending on the number of teams. The top team in each Division 4 group is promoted to Division 3 and the three lowest placed teams from each Division 3 league are relegated in their place. The second placed teams in each Division 4 group plays promotion/relegation play-offs against the fourth lowest teams in Division 3. The bottom two teams in each Division 4 group are relegated to Division 5.

== Administration ==
The District Football Associations are responsible for the administration of Division 4. The Swedish Football Association is responsible for the administration of Division 3 and the higher tiers of the Swedish football league system.
