= 1997–98 Svenska Cupen =

Tournament details
- Country: Sweden
- Teams: 542

Final positions
- Champions: Helsingborgs IF
- Runners-up: Örgryte IS

Tournament statistics
- Matches played: 542

The 1997–98 Svenska Cupen was the 43rd season of the main Swedish football Cup. The final of the competition took place on 14 May 1998 and was held in Gothenburg. Örgryte IS and Helsingborgs IF drew 1–1 before an attendance of 2,559 spectators. The replay was held in Helsingborg a week later with the score also 1–1 with Helsingborgs IF winning 3–0 on penalties. Public interest was much greater for this match with an attendance of 13,092.

== Preliminary round 1 ==
| Tie no | Home team | Score | Away team | Attendance |
|---|---|---|---|---|
| 1 | Valby/Västra Klagstorps BK (WC) | 2–3 | Ramlösa BoIS (D3) | |
| 2 | Båstad GIF (D4) | 1–3 | Markaryds IF (D3) | |
| 3 | Bjärnums GoIF (D4) | 1–3 | AIK Atlas (D4) | |
| 4 | Johannishus SK (WC) | 1–8 | Kristianstads FF (D2) | |
| 5 | Listorps IF (D4) | 2–1 | IS Halmia (D2) | |
| 6 | Tollarps IF (D4) | 1–0 | BK Landora (D3) | |
| 7 | Tvings GoIF (WC) | 0–2 | Ystads IF (D3) | |
| 8 | Askeröds IF (D4) | 5–2 | Växjö BK (D3) | |
| 9 | BK Fram (D4) | 3–1 | Sennans IF (D4) | |
| 10 | Staffanstorps GIF (D4) | 1–3 | Kirsebergs IF (D3) | |
| 11 | Fjärdsjömåla AIF (WC) | 0–9 | IFK Simrishamn (D3) | |
| 12 | FBK Balkan (D4) | 3–0 | Sösdala IF (D3) | |
| 13 | Skanör/Falsterbo IF (D4) | 3–1 | Strömsnäsbruks IF (D3) | |
| 14 | Snöstorp Nyhem FF (D4) | 2–1 | Veberöds AIF (D2) | |
| 15 | Ängelholms FF (D4) | 12–0 | Arlövs BI (D3) | |
| 16 | Stavstens IF (D4) | 2–1 | Älmhults IF (D2) | |
| 17 | Hörvikens IF (D4) | 1–2 | Helsingborgs Södra BIS (D3) | |
| 18 | NK Croatia (D4) | 0–1 | Sjöbo IF (D4) | |
| 19 | Bunkeflo IF (D4) | 3–4 (gg) | IF Leikin (D2) | |
| 20 | Perstorps SK (D4) | 0–2 | Husie IF (D3) | |
| 21 | Veddinge BK (WC) | 0–1 | Kinna IF (D3) | |
| 22 | Mölnlycke IF (D4) | 0–4 | Skrea IF (D4) | |
| 23 | Arvidstorps IK (D4) | 2–4 | Landskrona BoIS (D2) | |
| 24 | Stafsinge IF (WC) | 0–2 | Värnamo Södra FF (D3) | |
| 25 | Knippla IK (D4) | 0–1 | IFK Fjärås (D3) | |
| 26 | Bergsjö IF (D4) | 0–2 | Holmalunds IF (D2) | |
| 27 | Brämhults IK (D4) | 7–1 | Floda BoIF (D4) | |
| 28 | Väröbacka GIF (WC) | 1–4 | Ytterby IS (D3) | |
| 29 | Älvsborgs FF (WC) | 0–1 | IFK Trollhättan (D3) | |
| 30 | Gerdskens BK (D4) | 3–2 | IF Warta (D4) | |
| 31 | Varbergs GoIS (D4) | 2–3 | IFK Hällingsjö (D3) | |
| 32 | Sävedalens IF (D4) | 2–3 (gg) | Vinbergs IF (D2) | |
| 33 | Skoftebyns IF (D4) | 1–3 | GAIS (D2) | |
| 34 | Rabbalshede IK (WC) | 1–6 | Melleruds IF (D3) | |
| 35 | Landvetter IS (D4) | 0–3 | Mariedals IK (D3) | |
| 36 | Ahlafors IF (WC) | 1–4 | Inlands IF (D3) | |
| 37 | Byttorps IF (D4) | 1–2 (gg) | Qviding FIF (D2) | |
| 38 | Gilleby IF (WC) | 2–3 | Trollhättans BoIS (D3) | |
| 39 | Arvesgärde IF (WC) | 2–1 | Skärhamns IK (D3) | |
| 40 | Trollhättans IF (D4) | 4–0 | Götaholms BK (D4) | |
| 41 | Frändefors IF (WC) | 1–2 | Arentorps SK (D4) | |
| 42 | Skepplanda BTK (D4) | 1–0 | IFK Uddevalla (D2) | |
| 43 | Ödsmåls IK (D4) | 0–3 | Göteborgs FF (D4) | |
| 44 | Håfreströms IF (WC) | 2–3 (gg) | Lysekils FF (D3) | |
| 45 | Gällstads AIS (D4) | 5–1 | Kortedala IF (D4) | |
| 46 | Herrljunga SK (D4) | 1–9 | Lundby IF (D2) | |
| 47 | Högsäters GF (WC) | 4–0 | Grebbestads IF (D3) | |
| 48 | Åsebro IF (D4) | 2–0 | Skogslunds IF (D4) | |

| Tie no | Home team | Score | Away team | Attendance |
|---|---|---|---|---|
| 49 | Dalsjöfors GoIF (WC) | 1–4 | Varbergs GIF (D3) | |
| 50 | Sjömarkens IF (D4) | 1–4 | BK Slätta Damm (D3) | |
| 51 | IF Tymer (D4) | 0–3 | Kållereds SK (D3) | |
| 52 | IFK Hjo (WC) | 0–4 | Nässjö FF (D3) | |
| 53 | Falköpings FK (D4) | 2–0 | Gånghesters SK (D4) | |
| 54 | Ankarsrums IS (WC) | 1–2 | Linköpings FF (D3) | |
| 55 | Rödsle BK (D4) | 1–0 (gg) | Skeninge IK (D4) | |
| 56 | Lindås BK (D4) | 1–3 | Hultsfreds FK (D3) | |
| 57 | Hvetlanda GIF (D4) | 0–1 | Åhus Horna BK (D3) | |
| 58 | Bredaryds IK (D4) | 3–0 | Ulricehamns IFK (D3) | |
| 59 | Hovslätts IK (D4) | 0–9 | Tidaholms GIF (D2) | |
| 60 | Torpa AIS (D4) | 0–2 | BK Zeros (D3) | |
| 61 | Fiskeby IF (WC) | 2–1 (gg) | Västerviks FF (D4) | |
| 62 | Gnösjö IF (D4) | 1–3 | Skövde AIK (D2) | |
| 63 | Sävsjö FF (D4) | 5–3 | Skillingaryds IS (D4) | |
| 64 | Boxholms IF (WC) | 1–2 | Tranås AIF (D3) | |
| 65 | LSW IF (D4) | 2–1 | Husqvarna FF (D2) | |
| 66 | Lessebo GoIF (D4) | 0–1 | Listerby IK (D4) | |
| 67 | Rörviks IF (D4) | 0–2 | Lunds BK (D2) | |
| 68 | Lagans AIK (D4) | 0–1 | Högaborgs BK (D2) | |
| 69 | IF Eksjö (D4) | 1–4 | Kalmar FF (D2) | |
| 70 | Limmareds IF (D4) | 1–5 | Växjö Norra IF (D2) | |
| 71 | Bankeryds SK (D4) | 4–1 | Hjulsbro IK (D2) | |
| 72 | Skultorps IF (D4) | 0–2 | BK Forward (D2) | |
| 73 | Gullspångs IF (D4) | 0–7 | Rynninge IK (D3) | |
| 74 | Skara FC (D4) | 0–4 | Karlslunds IF (D3) | |
| 75 | Bråtens IK (D4) | 0–4 | Vivalla-Lundby IF (D3) | |
| 76 | Finnerödja IF(D4) | 3–1 | IFK Mariestad (D4) | |
| 77 | Sköllersta IF (D4) | 1–3 | Hemgårdarnas BK (D4) | |
| 78 | Simonstorps IF (D4) | 0–5 | Nyköpings BIS (D2) | |
| 79 | Ringarums IF (D4) | 1–4 | Värmbols FC (D4) | |
| 80 | Dagsbergs IF (D4) | 1–0 | Malmköpings IF (D4) | |
| 81 | Katrineholms SK (D4) | 0–2 | BK Kenty (D4) | |
| 82 | Härad IF (D4) | 2–3 (gg) | IFK Västerås (D2) | |
| 83 | Kolsva IF (D4) | 0–3 | Karlstad BK (D2) | |
| 84 | Laxå IF (D4) | 0–4 | IF Sylvia (D2) | |
| 85 | Ransta IK (D4) | 1–3 | IFK Hallsberg (D4) | |
| 86 | Skyllbergs IK (WC) | 0–4 | IFK Kristinehamn (D4) | |
| 87 | Filipstads FF (D4) | 3–1 | Kungsörs SK (D4) | |
| 88 | Hallstahammars SK (D4) | 0–7 | IFK Eskilstuna (D2) | |
| 89 | BK Hird (D4) | 0–5 | Hargs BK (D2) | |
| 90 | Vretstorps IF (WC) | 1–5 | IFK Ölme (D3) | |
| 91 | Frövi IK (WC) | 1–9 | Skiljebo SK (D3) | |
| 92 | IF Rune (WC) | 1–3 | Gnesta FF (D3) | |
| 93 | Västerås BK 30 (WC) | 0–8 | Örebro SK Ungdom (D4) | |
| 94 | VoIF Diana (WC) | 4–0 | Enskede IK (D4) | |
| 95 | New Mill FF (WC) | 4–2 | Värtans SK (D3) | |
| 96 | Runtuna IK/Löthen (WC) | 1–2 | Huddinge IF (D3) | |

== Preliminary round 2 ==
| Tie no | Home team | Score | Away team | Attendance |
|---|---|---|---|---|
| 1 | Ramlösa BoIS (D3) | 7–0 | Markaryds IF (D3) | |
| 2 | Dalby GIF (D4) | 1–2 | GIF Nike (D3) | |
| 3 | AIK Atlas (D4) | 1–4 | Alvesta GoIF (D3) | |
| 4 | Kulladals FF (D3) | 1–6 | Kristianstads FF (D2) | |
| 5 | Listorps IF (D4) | 6–1 | Tollarps IF (D4) | |
| 6 | Limhamns IF (D4) | 3–4 | Påarps GIF (D4) | |
| 7 | Svalövs BK (D4) | 2–3 | Malmö BI (D4) | |
| 8 | BK Fram (D4) | 1–5 | Ystads IF (D3) | |
| 9 | Askeröds IF (D4) | 0–5 | IFK Simrishamn (D3) | |
| 10 | Vinslövs IF (D4) | 0–1 | Kirsebergs IF (D3) | |
| 11 | Östra Ljungby IF (D4) | 1–2 | Oxie IF (D4) | |
| 12 | Stora Harrie IF (D4) | 0–1 | BK Olympic (D2) | |
| 13 | IFK Klagshamn (D4) | 1–2 | FBK Balkan (D4) | |
| 14 | Härslövs IK (D4) | 0–5 | IFK Trelleborg (D2) | |
| 15 | Skanör/Falsterbo IF (D4) | 2–3 | Snöstorp Nyhem FF (D4) | |
| 16 | Ängelholms FF (D4) | 3–2 (gg) | Stavstens IF (D4) | |
| 17 | Sjöbo IF (D4) | 2–1 | Helsingborg Södra BIS (D3) | |
| 18 | Husie IF (D3) | 0–1 | IF Leikin (D2) | |
| 19 | Alets IK (D4) | 0–4 | Anderstorps IF (D3) | |
| 20 | Skrea IF (D4) | 1–0 (gg) | Kinna IF (D3) | |
| 21 | Smålandsstenars GoIF (D4) | 0–1 | Landskrona BoIS (D2) | |
| 22 | Grimetorns IK (D4) | 1–3 | Värnamo Södra FF (D3) | |
| 23 | IFK Fjärås (D3) | 2–3 | Holmalunds IF (D2) | |
| 24 | IFK Lammhult (D4) | 3–2 (gg) | Sibbhults IF (D4) | |
| 25 | Brämhults IK (D4) | 2–3 | Ytterby IS (D3) | |
| 26 | Gerdskens BK (D4) | 2–1 | IFK Trollhättan (D3) | |
| 27 | IFK Hällingsjö (D3) | 1–3 | Vibergs IF (D2) | |
| 28 | Fristads GoIF (D4) | 0–1 | IFK Värnamo (D2) | |
| 29 | Färgelanda IF (D4) | 3–1 | Tråvads IF (D4) | |
| 30 | IFK Valla (D4) | 2–1 | Trollhättans FK (D2) | |
| 31 | IFK Falköping (D4) | 1–0 | Torslanda IK (D3) | |
| 32 | IF Väster (D4) | 0–3 | Kungshamns IF (D4) | |
| 33 | IFK Lane (D4) | 3–1 | Borås GoIF (D4) | |
| 34 | Melleruds IF (D3) | 0–2 | GAIS (D2) | 300 |
| 35 | Sandarna BK (D4) | 1–1 (pen 1–2) | Mariedals IK (D3) | |
| 36 | Henåns IF (D4) | 0–2 | Inlands IF (D3) | |
| 37 | Trollhättans BoIS (D3) | 2–3 | Qviding FIF (D2) | |
| 38 | Arvesgärde IF (WC) | 11–1 | Trollhättans IF (D4) | |
| 39 | Slottskogens IK (D4) | 2–3 | Alingsås IF (D4) | |
| 40 | Horreds IF (D4) | 0–1 | Sandhults SK (D4) | |
| 41 | Stenstorps IF (D4) | 2–0 | Aneby SK (D3) | |
| 42 | Arentorps SK (D4) | 8–1 | Skepplanda BTK (D4) | |
| 43 | Göteborgs FF (D4) | 7–0 | Godhem/HTIF (D4) | |
| 44 | Nödinge SK (D4) | 1–4 | Lysekils FF (D3) | |
| 45 | Gällstads AIS (D4) | 4–1 | Ulvåkers IF (D3) | |
| 46 | IFK Örby (D4) | 0–1 | Lundby IF (D2) | |
| 47 | Högsäters GF (WC) | 0–2 | Åsebro IF (D4) | |
| 48 | Mossens BK (D4) | 0–1 | Varbergs GIF (D3) | |
| 49 | Åsarp/Trädets IF (D4) | 2–1 | BK Slätta Damm (D3) | |
| 50 | Burseryds IF (D4) | 1–3 | Nässjö FF (D3) | |
| 51 | Sandareds IF (D4) | 0–6 | Kållereds SK (D3) | |
| 52 | Jönköpings Södra IF (D4) | 1–2 (gg) | Falköpings FK (D4) | |
| 53 | Vimmerby IF (D4) | 0–4 | Linköpings FF (D3) | |
| 54 | Rödsle BK (D4) | 2–3 (gg) | Smedby AIS (D4) | |
| 55 | Vetlanda FF (D4) | 2–3 | Kalmar AIK (D2) | |
| 56 | IFK Motala (D4) | 0–5 | IF Hagapojkarna (D4) | |
| 57 | Hovmantorps GoIF (D4) | 2–2 (pen 4–5) | Hultfreds FK (D3) | |
| 58 | Bors SK (D4) | 1–2 | Åhus Horna BK (D3) | |
| 59 | Lidhults GIF (D4) | 2–1 (gg) | Bredaryds IK (D4) | |
| 60 | Tenhults IF (D3) | 3–2 (gg) | Tidaholms GIF (D2) | |
| 61 | Fiskeby IF (WC) | 0–3 | BK Zeros (D3) | |
| 62 | Sävsjö FF (D4) | 0–3 | Skövde AIK (D2) | |
| 63 | Malmslätts AIK (D4) | 3–1 | Tranås AIF (D3) | |
| 64 | LSW IF (D4) | 6–0 | IFK Skövde (D3) | |
| 65 | Listerby IK (D4) | 3–3 (pen 1–3) | Färjestadens GoIF (D3) | |
| 66 | Broby IF (D4) | 1–5 | Lunds BK (D2) | |
| 67 | Klippans BIF (D3) | 0–2 | Högaborgs BK (D2) | |
| 68 | IFK Karlshamn (D3) | 1–0 | Kalmar FF (D2) | |
| 69 | Stensjöns IF (D4) | 1–0 | Bankeryds SK (D4) | |
| 70 | Hanaskogs IS (D3) | 3–0 | Växjö Norra IF (D2) | |
| 71 | Forshaga IF (D4) | 2–1 | BK Forward (D2) | |
| 72 | Säffle FF (D4) | 2–1 | Rynninge IK (D3) | |
| 73 | Karlslunds IF (D3) | 2–3 | IF Heimer (D2) | |
| 74 | Kils AIK (D4) | 2–1 | Bengtsfors IF (D4) | |
| 75 | Vivalla-Lundby IF (D3) | 3–2 | Äppelbo AIK (D3) | |
| 76 | Strömtorps IK (D4) | 2–1 (gg) | Finnerödja IF (D4) | |
| 77 | Hemgårdarnas BK (D4) | 2–3 (gg) | Arboga Södra IF (D3) | |
| 78 | Vämbols FC (D4) | 2–4 | Nyköpings BIS (D2) | |
| 79 | Vänersborgs IF (D3) | 2–3 | IK Kongahälla (D2) | |
| 80 | Dagsbergs IF (D4) | 4–3 | Syrianska Föreningen (D3) | |
| 81 | BK Kenty (D4) | 2–1 (gg) | Finspångs BK (D3) | |
| 82 | Bollstanäs SK (D4) | 0–4 | IFK Västerås (D2) | |
| 83 | Mjölby AI (D3) | 0–4 | IF Sylvia (D2) | |
| 84 | IK Arvika (D4) | 0–3 | Karlstad BK (D2) | |
| 85 | IFK Kristinehamn (D4) | 4–5 | IFK Hallsberg (D4) | |
| 86 | Filipstads FF (D4) | 3–0 | Islingby IK (D3) | |
| 87 | Södra Trögds IK (D4) | 1–4 | IFK Eskilstuna (D2) | |
| 88 | IK Franke (D3) | 1–4 | Hargs BK (D2) | |
| 89 | Fjärdhundra SK (D4) | 1–4 | Skiljebo SK (D3) | |
| 90 | Gnesta FF (D3) | 3–2 (gg) | IFK Kumla (D2) | |
| 91 | Örebro SK Ungdom (D4) | 2–0 | Enköpings IS (D4) | |
| 92 | Hova IF (D4) | 1–2 | IFK Ölme (D3) | |
| 93 | Turebergs IF (D4) | 0–3 | Sunnersta AIF (D4) | |
| 94 | Bro IK (D4) | 0–4 | FC Plavi Team (D2) | |
| 95 | FC Krukan (D4) | 4–3 | Upsala IF (D4) | |
| 96 | Rågsveds IF (D4) | 2–3 (gg) | Bromstens IK (D4) | |
| 97 | Arlanda FF (D4) | 0–1 | FoC Farsta (D3) | |
| 98 | Topkapi IK (D4) | 2–3 (gg) | IK Tellus (D4) | |
| 99 | IFK Viksjö (D3) | 1–5 | Älvsjö AIK (D2) | |
| 100 | Markim/Orkesta IF (D4) | 1–6 | BKV Norrtälje (D3) | |
| 101 | Täby IS (D4) | 0–4 | Tyresö FF (D2) | |

| Tie no | Home team | Score | Away team | Attendance |
|---|---|---|---|---|
| 102 | Håbo FF (D3) | 4–0 | IFK Österåker (D2) | |
| 103 | Valsta Syrianska IK (D4) | 2–5 | Vallentuna BK (D2) | |
| 104 | Ängby IF (D4) | 1–4 | IFK Stockholm (D3) | |
| 105 | Fanna BK (WC) | 1–2 | Hägerstens SK (D4) | |
| 106 | Råsunda IS (D3) | 3–0 | Gamla Upsala SK (D3) | |
| 107 | VoIF Diana (WC) | 0–1 | Enebybergs IF (D2) | |
| 108 | Fårösunds GoIK (D4) | w.o. | Helenelunds IK (D4) | |
| 109 | Films SK (D4) | 0–3 | Väsby IK (D2) | |
| 110 | Hedesunda IF (WC) | 2–1 | Strömsbergs IF (D4) | |
| 111 | Knivsta IK (D4) | 1–3 | Forsbacka IK (D4) | |
| 112 | Hangvar SK (WC) | 2–3 (gg) | Klintehamns IK (D4) | |
| 113 | IK Oden (D4) | 2–1 | Tullinge TP (D4) | |
| 114 | Gustavsbergs IF (D4) | 0–4 | IK Sirius (D2) | |
| 115 | Hagaströms SK (WC) | 2–4 | IK Hinden (D4) | |
| 116 | Rö IK (D4) | 1–0 | Stuvsta IF (D4) | |
| 117 | New Mill FF (WC) | 2–3 | Stureby SK (D4) | |
| 118 | Hässelby SK (D4) | 3–2 | Gideonsbergs IF (D3) | |
| 119 | Älta IF (D4) | 5–0 | IK Frej (D4) | |
| 120 | Arameiska-Syrianska KIF (D4) | 0–1 | Huddinge IF (D3) | |
| 121 | Roslagsbergs IF (D4) | 2–1 | Garda IK (D3) | |
| 122 | FF Södertälje (D4) | 4–3 | Solberga BK (D4) | |
| 123 | Jäders IF (D4) | 0–6 | FC Café Opera (D2) | |
| 124 | Kungsängens IF (WC) | 2–3 | Sundbybergs IK (D4) | |
| 125 | Hanvikens SK (D4) | 0–1 | Visby IF Gute (D2) | |
| 126 | IK Bele (D4) | 5–2 | Heby AIF (D3) | |
| 127 | Boo SK (WC) | 2–7 | Östermalms IS (D4) | |
| 128 | Bagarmossen/Bellevue IF (D4) | 0–0 (pen 5–6) | Spånga IS (D3) | |
| 129 | Akropolis IF (D4) | 1–3 | IF Vesta (D3) | |
| 130 | Reymersholms IK (WC) | 5–1 | Visby AIK (D4) | |
| 131 | Nynäshamns IF (D4) | 2–1 | Gröndals IK (D4) | |
| 132 | Östertälje IK (D4) | 1–4 | Lindö FF (D3) | |
| 133 | Jössefors IK (D4) | 0–5 | IK Sturehov (D3) | |
| 134 | Edsvalla IF (WC) | 2–4 | Nora BK (D4) | |
| 135 | Bullermyrens IK (D4) | 2–4 | Västerås IK (D4) | |
| 136 | Tillberga IK (D4) | 2–1 (gg) | IF Vulcanus (D4) | |
| 137 | IFK Våmhus (D4) | 2–0 | Forssa BK (D3) | |
| 138 | Leksands IF (D4) | 1–0 | Sala FF (D3) | |
| 139 | IF Vindhemspojkarna (D4) | 0–3 | Avesta AIK (D4) | |
| 140 | Skultuna IS (D4) | 0–1 | Essinge IK (D4) | |
| 141 | Rottneros IK (D4) | 1–0 (gg) | Malungs IF (D4) | |
| 142 | Norrsundets IF (D4) | 1–5 | Kvarnsvedens IK (D4) | |
| 143 | Smedjebackens FK (D4) | 0–7 | KB Karlskoga (D3) | |
| 144 | Månkarbo IF (WC) | 3–1 | Gävle GIK (D4) | |
| 145 | Djurmo/Segro IK (D4) | 2–1 | Brynäs IF (D4) | |
| 146 | IFK Hedemora (WC) | 3–1 | Köping FF (D3) | |
| 147 | Hamrånge GIF (D4) | 4–0 | Korsnäs IF (D3) | |
| 148 | Krylbo IF (WC) | 0–7 | Sandvikens AIK (D4) | |
| 149 | Årsunda IF (D4) | 2–1 | Gimo IF (D2) | |
| 150 | Säters IF (D3) | 3–2 (gg) | IFK Gävle (D2) | |
| 151 | Arbrå BK (D4) | 3–1 | Torsåker IF (D4) | |
| 152 | Österfärnebo IF (WC) | 1–2 | Falu BS (D4) | |
| 153 | Söderhamns FF (D3) | 2–3 (gg | Sandvikens IF (D2) | |
| 154 | Stugsunds IK (D4) | 1–11 | Gestrike-Hammarby IF (D3) | |
| 155 | Edsbyns IF (D4) | 3–1 | Slätta SK (D3) | |
| 156 | Kubikensborgs IF (D4) | 5–1 | Sandarne SIF (D4) | |
| 157 | IFK Bergvik (D4) | 1–2 | Alnö IF (D3) | |
| 158 | Enångers IK (D4) | 2–0 | Fränsta IK (D3) | |
| 159 | Sund IF (D4) | 1–2 | IF Älgarna (D3) | |
| 160 | Bjuråkers GIF (D4) | 1–2 (gg) | Stockviks FF (D4) | |
| 161 | Åsens SK (WC) | 1–3 | Bollnäs GIF (D3) | |
| 162 | Njurunda IK (D4) | 1–0 | Iggesunds IK (D4) | |
| 163 | Kovlands IF (D4) | 0–1 (gg) | Harmångers IF (D4) | |
| 164 | Korskrogens IK (WC) | 0–5 | Svartviks IF (D4) | |
| 165 | Järvsö BK (WC) | 2–4 | Essviks AIF (D4) | |
| 166 | IFK Gnarp (WC) | 1–4 | IFK Timrå (D4) | |
| 167 | Heffners/Ortvikens IF (D4) | 1–1 (pen 5–4) | Delsbo IF (D2) | |
| 168 | Torpshammars IF (WC) | 1–3 | Krokom-Dvärslätts IF (D3) | |
| 169 | Svegs IK (WC) | 0–5 | IFK Mora (D3) | |
| 170 | Vemdalens/Vemhåns FK (D4) | 2–3 | Ljusdals IF (D4) | |
| 171 | Föllinge IK (WC) | 2–3 | Bjärtrå IS (D4) | |
| 172 | KB 65 IF (D4) | 2–1 | Selånger FK (D3) | |
| 173 | IFK Ålund (D4) | 4–2 | Röbäcks IF (D4) | |
| 174 | Domsjö IF (D4) | 2–1 | Vännäs AIK (D4) | |
| 175 | Molidens IK (WC) | 2–3 (gg) | Sandviks IK (D4) | |
| 176 | Sidensjö IK (D4) | 1–7 | IFK Umeå (D4) | |
| 177 | Mariehems SK (D4) | 3–4 | Hägglunds IoFK (D4) | |
| 178 | Nysätra/Flarken FK (D4) | 1–2 | Arnäs IF (D4) | |
| 179 | Frostvikens FF (D4) | 4–1 | Åsele IK (D4) | |
| 180 | Vebomarks IF (WC) | 0–2 | Notvikens IK (D4) | |
| 181 | Spölands IF (WC) | 1–3 | Vindelns IF (D4) | |
| 182 | Norsjö IF (D4) | 0–2 | Alviks IK (D4) | |
| 183 | Luleå FC (D4) | 4–0 | Rönnskärs IF (D4) | |
| 184 | Friska Viljor FC (D4) | 2–6 | Umedalens IF (D2) | |
| 185 | Lycksele IF (WC) | 0–4 | Täfteå IK (D3) | |
| 186 | Tavelsjö AIK (D4) | 3–1 | Piteå IF (D2) | |
| 187 | Gammelstads IF (D4) | 2–3 (gg) | Sunnanå SK (D3) | |
| 188 | Björna IF (D4) | 0–7 | Obbola IK (D2) | |
| 189 | Malå IF (D4) | 1–1 (pen 4–5) | Storfors AIK (D3) | |
| 190 | Sunderby SK (D4) | 2–5 | Robertsfors IK (D3) | |
| 191 | Bergnäsets AIK (D4) | 1–0 | Morön BK (D2) | |
| 192 | Burträsk IK (D4) | 3–4 (gg) | Rutviks SK (D3) | |
| 193 | Medle SK (D4) | 2–0 | Luleå SK (D3) | |
| 194 | Anundsjö IF (D3) | 1–3 | Gimonäs CK (D2) | |
| 195 | Sorsele IF (D4) | 1–3 | Hedens IF (D3) | |
| 196 | Hemmingsmarks IF (D4) | 0–3 | Skellefteå AIK (D2) | |
| 197 | Kågedalens AIF (D4) | 0–1 (gg) | IFK Kalix (D3) | |
| 198 | Blattnicksele IF (D3) | 0–3 | Bodens BK (D2) | |
| 199 | Kusfors IK (D4) | 2–8 | IFK Arvidsjaur (D3) | |
| 200 | Brännbergs IF (D4) | 0–3 | Assi IF (D3) | |
| 201 | Ulatti IF (D4) | 0–1 | Kiruna FF (D2) | |
| 202 | Parkalompolo IK (D4) | 0–3 | Malmbergets AIF (D3) | |

== First round ==
| Tie no | Home team | Score | Away team | Attendance |
|---|---|---|---|---|
| 1 | Listorps IF (D4) | 0–2 | Kristianstads FF (D2) | |
| 2 | Ystads IF FF (D3) | 2–1 | IFK Malmö FK (D1) | 322 |
| 3 | Malmö BI (D4) | 3–1 | Ramlösa BoIS (D3) | |
| 4 | Påarps GIF (D4) | 1–2 | IFK Trelleborg (D2) | |
| 5 | BK Olympic (D2) | 0–3 | IFK Hässleholm (D1) | 180 |
| 6 | FBK Balkan (D4) | 4–1 | IFK Simrishamn (D3) | |
| 7 | Sjöbo IF (D4) | 2–2 (pen 2–4) | IF Leikin (D2) | |
| 8 | Snötorps/Nyhems FF (D4) | 5–0 | GIF Nike (D3) | |
| 9 | Alvesta GIF (D3) | 0–1 | Mjällby AIF (D1) | 400 |
| 10 | IFK Karlshamn (D3) | 1–1 (pen 3–2) | Lunds BK (D2) | |
| 11 | Hanaskogs IS (D3) | 2–5 | Landskrona BoIS (D2) | |
| 12 | Lidhults GIF (D4) | 3–5 | Kirsebergs IF (D3) | |
| 13 | Ängelholms FF (D4) | 2–0 | Skrea IF (D4) | |
| 14 | IFK Lammhult (D4) | 0–5 | Högaborgs BK (D2) | |
| 15 | Åhus HBK (D3) | 1–2 (gg) | IFK Värnamo (D2) | |
| 16 | Värnamo Södra FF (D3) | 0–4 | Vinbergs IF (D2) | |
| 17 | Sandhults SK (D4) | 1–3 | Tenhults IF (D3) | |
| 18 | Färjestadens GoIF (D3) | 2–0 | Myresjö IF (D1) | 150 |
| 19 | Linköpings FF (D3) | 2–3 (gg) | Trelleborgs FF (A) | 1,020 |
| 20 | IF Hagapojkarna (D4) | 0–3 | Åtvidabergs FF (D1) | |
| 21 | Hultsfreds FK (D3) | 4–1 | Kalmar AIK (D2) | |
| 22 | Anderstorps IF (D3) | 1–5 | Falkenbergs FF (D1) | |
| 23 | Arvesgärde IF (WC) | 0–11 | Holmalunds IF (D2) | |
| 24 | Smedby AIS (D4) | 5–1 | Stensjöns IF (D4) | |
| 25 | Malmslätts AIK (D4) | 2–1 | Nässjö FF (D3) | |
| 26 | Varbergs GIF FF (D3) | 1–4 | GAIS (D2) | 515 |
| 27 | Gerdskens BK (D4) | 0–5 | Norrby IF (D1) | 442 |
| 28 | Göteborgs FF (D4) | 1–3 | Mariedals IK (D3) | |
| 29 | Kungshamns IF (D4) | 1–7 | Lundby IF (D2) | |
| 30 | IFK Valla (D4) | 2–8 | Qviding FIF (D2) | |
| 31 | Lysekils FF (D3) | 1–0 | BK Häcken (D1) | 375 |
| 32 | Färgelanda IF (D4) | 2–5 | Örgryte IS (A) | 700 |
| 33 | Kållereds SK (D3) | 1–2 (gg) | IF Heimer (D2) | |
| 34 | IFK Lane (D4) | 3–2 | Ytterby IS (D3) | |
| 35 | Åsarp/Trädets IF (D4) | 2–11 | Västra Frölunda IF (D1) | |
| 36 | Arentorps SK (D4) | 1–2 (gg) | Inlands IF (D3) | |
| 37 | Stenstorps IF (D4) | 0–2 | IK Oddevold (D1) | 187 |
| 38 | Gällstads AIS (D4) | 3–5 | IK Kongahälla (D2) | |
| 39 | Säffle FF (D4) | 0–2 | Stenungsunds IF (D1) | |
| 40 | Forshaga IF (D4) | 0–6 | Skövde AIK (D2) | |
| 41 | IFK Hallsberg (D4) | 1–2 (gg) | IFK Falköping (D4) | |
| 42 | Falköpings FK (D4) | 3–1 | Strömtorps IK (D4) | |
| 43 | BK Zeros (D3) | 2–3 | Karlstad BK (D2) | |
| 44 | Kils AIK (D4) | 1–5 | Örebro SK Ungdom (D4) | |
| 45 | KB Karlskoga (D3) | 0–3 | Gunnilse IS (D1) | 310 |
| 46 | Västerås IK (D4) | 3–2 | Panos Ljungskile SK (A) | 415 |
| 47 | Filipstads FF (D4) | 1–0 | Vivalla-Lundby IF (D3) | |
| 48 | Arboga Södra IF (D3) | 0–2 | Hertzöga BK (D1) | 424 |
| 49 | LSW IF (D4) | 2–1 (gg) | IFK Ölme (D3) | |
| 50 | IK Sturehov (D4) | 2–2 (pen 0–3) | Rottneros IK (D4) | |
| 51 | Nora BK (D4) | 0–8 | Motala AIF FK (D1) | 208 |
| 52 | BK Kenty (D4) | 1–5 | Nyköpings BIS (D2) | |
| 53 | Östermalms IS (D4) | 1–0 | Lindö FF (D3) | |
| 54 | IF Sylvia (D2) | 1–0 | IF Brommapojkarna (D1) | 170 |
| 55 | IK Tellus (D4) | 2–4 | BKV Norrtälje (D3) | |
| 56 | Dagsbergs IF (D4) | 3–8 | IFK Eskilstuna (D2) | |
| 57 | Gnesta FF (D3) | 2–1 | Älvsjö AIK FF (D2) | |
| 58 | IF Vesta (D3) | 1–3 | Degerfors IF (A) | 1,239 |

| Tie no | Home team | Score | Away team | Attendance |
|---|---|---|---|---|
| 59 | Bromstens IK (D4) | 0–2 | FC Plavi Team (D2) | |
| 60 | Falu BS FK (D4) | 4–1 | Skiljebo SK (D3) | |
| 61 | Sunnersta AIF (D4) | 1–3 | IFK Stockholm (D3) | |
| 62 | IFK Hedemora (WC) | 1–11 | IFK Västerås FK (D2) | |
| 63 | IK Hinden (D4) | 0–1 | Gestrike/Hammarby IF (D3) | |
| 64 | Roslagsbro IF (D4) | 2–1 (gg) | Råsunda IS (D3) | |
| 65 | Klintehamns IK (D4) | 0–5 | Essinge IK FK (D4) | |
| 66 | FF Södertälje (D4) | 0–5 | IF Elfsborg (A) | 907 |
| 67 | Stureby SK (D4) | 0–4 | Visby IF Gute FK (D2) | |
| 68 | Nynäshamns IF (D4) | 2–3 | Enköpings SK FK (D1) | 103 |
| 69 | Sundbybergs IK (D4) | 1–14 | Vallentuna BK (D2) | |
| 70 | Rö IK (D4) | 1–4 | FC Café Opera Djursholm (D2) | |
| 71 | Fårösunds GoIK (D4) | 3–4 (gg) | Älta IF (D4) | |
| 72 | Håbo FF (D3) | 4–0 | Enebybergs IF (D2) | |
| 73 | Reymersholms IK (WC) | 4–2 | Tillberga IK (D4) | |
| 74 | Hedesunda IK (WC) | 2–3 | IK Bele (D4) | |
| 75 | Huddinge IF (D3) | 0–5 | Hammarby IF (D1) | 850 |
| 76 | Hägerstens SK (D4) | 0–2 | Hargs BK (D2) | |
| 77 | Hässelby SK (D4) | 1–2 | Spånga IS FK (D3) | |
| 78 | Avesta AIK (D4) | 2–6 | FoC Farsta (D3) | |
| 79 | FC Krukan (D4) | 1–2 | IK Sirius FK (D2) | |
| 80 | IK Oden (D4) | 0–5 | Assyriska Föreningen (D1) | 91 |
| 81 | Forsbacka IK (D4) | 1–3 | Leksands IK FK (D4) | |
| 82 | Månkarbo IF (WC) | 1–2 (gg) | Tyresö FF (D2) | |
| 83 | Säters IF (D3) | 2–1 | Vasalunds IF (D1) | 410 |
| 84 | Sandvikens AIK FK (D4) | 0–6 | Väsby IK FK (D2) | |
| 85 | Kvarnsvedens IK (D4) | 0–7 | Spårvägens FF (D1) | 123 |
| 86 | Årsunda IF (D4) | 1–4 | Nacka FF (D1) | 150 |
| 87 | IFK Våmhus (D4) | 2–2 (pen 2–1) | Arbrå BK (D4) | |
| 88 | Hamrånge GIF (D4) | 0–4 | IK Brage (D1) | |
| 89 | Edsbyns IF (D4) | 1–3 | Gefle IF (D1) | 616 |
| 90 | IFK Mora FK (D3) | 1–0 | Sandvikens IF (D2) | |
| 91 | IFK Timrå (D4) | 0–1 | Enångers IK (D4) | |
| 92 | Bollnäs GIF FF (D3) | 0–4 | GIF Sundsvall (D1) | 501 |
| 93 | Svartviks IF (D4) | 0–13 | IFK Norrköping (A) | 1,211 |
| 94 | Ljusdals IF (D4) | 2–2 (pen 5–4) | Bjärtrå IS (D4) | |
| 95 | Harmångers IF (D4) | 3–1 | Alnö IF (D3) | |
| 96 | Njurunda IK (D4) | 0–2 | Domsjö IF (D4) | |
| 97 | Hägglunds IoFK (D4) | 3–4 | Kubikenborgs IF (D4) | |
| 98 | IF Älgarna (D3) | 1–2 | Obbola IK (D2) | |
| 99 | Arnäs IF (D4) | 2–8 | Djurgårdens IF (D1) | 600 |
| 100 | Heffners-Ortvikens IF (D4) | 0–6 | Täfteå IK (D3) | |
| 101 | KB 65 IF (D4) | 0–5 | Krokom/Dvärsätts IF (D3) | |
| 102 | Stockviks FF (D4) | 0–1 | Umedalens IF (D2) | |
| 103 | Frostvikens FF (D4) | 0–10 | Umeå FC (D1) | |
| 104 | Tavelsjö AIK (D4) | 1–5 | Skellefteå AIK (D2) | |
| 105 | Essviks AIF (D4) | 0–1 (gg) | Gimonäs CK (D2) | |
| 106 | IFK Umeå (D4) | 3–4 | Sunnanå SK (D3) | |
| 107 | IFK Ålund (D4) | 0–3 | Kiruna FF (D2) | |
| 108 | Alviks IK (D4) | 3–0 | Rutviks SK (D3) | |
| 109 | Robertsfors IK (D3) | 0–1 | IFK Luleå (D1) | 223 |
| 110 | Vindelns IF (D4) | 0–1 | Assi IF (D3) | |
| 111 | Bergnäsets AIK (D4) | 1–3 | IFK Kalix (D3) | |
| 112 | Sandviks IK (D4) | 3–2 (gg) | Luleå FC (D4) | |
| 113 | IFK Arvidsjaur (D3) | 0–1 | Bodens BK (D2) | |
| 114 | Malmbergets AIF (D3) | 3–2 | Lira Luleå BK (D1) | 430 |
| 115 | Notvikens IK (D4) | 1–0 | Medle SK (D4) | |
| 116 | Storfors AIK (D3) | 0–7 | Västerås SK FK (A) | 500 |

== Second round ==
| Tie no | Home team | Score | Away team | Attendance |
|---|---|---|---|---|
| 1 | Ystads IF (D3) | 5–0 | Kristianstads FF (D2) | |
| 2 | Malmö BI (D4) | 1–3 | IFK Trelleborg (D2) | |
| 3 | FBK Balkan (D4) | 0–3 | IFK Hässleholm (D1) | 150 |
| 4 | Snöstorp/Nyhems FF (D4) | 2–3 | IF Leikin (D2) | |
| 5 | IFK Karlshamn (D3) | 1–2 | Mjällby AIF (D1) | 1,550 |
| 6 | Oxie IF (D4) | 0–3 | Malmö FF (A) | 1,528 |
| 7 | Kirsebergs IF (D3) | 1–1 (pen 4–5) | Landskrona BoIS (D2) | |
| 8 | Ängelholms FF (D4) | 0–4 | Halmstads BK (A) | 1,489 |
| 9 | Högaborgs BK (D2) | 4–1 | IFK Värnamo (D2) | |
| 10 | Tenhults IF (D3) | 1–2 | Vinbergs IF (D2) | |
| 11 | Färjestadens GoIF (D3) | 1–3 | Trelleborgs FF (A) | 296 |
| 12 | Alingsås IF (D4) | 0–8 | Helsingborgs IF (A) | 1,122 |
| 13 | Hultsfreds FK (D3) | 2–4 | Åtvidabergs FF (D1) | 332 |
| 14 | Holmalunds IF (D2) | 1–2 | Falkenbergs FF (D1) | 180 |
| 15 | Smedby AIS (D4) | 0–4 | Malmslätts AIK (D4) | |
| 16 | GAIS (D2) | 2–0 | Norrby IF (D1) | 642 |
| 17 | Mariedals IK (D3) | 2–4 | Lundby IF (D2) | 250 |
| 18 | Lysekils FF (D3) | 2–1 (gg) | Qviding FIF (D2) | |
| 19 | IF Heimer (D2) | 1–2 (gg) | Örgryte IS (A) | 669 |
| 20 | IFK Lane (D4) | 0–14 | Västra Frölunda IF (D1) | 135 |
| 21 | Åsebro IF (D4) | 1–11 | IFK Göteborg (A) | 3,014 |
| 22 | Inlands IF (D3) | 1–2 | IK Oddevold (D1) | 220 |
| 23 | IK Kongahälla (D2) | 1–2 (gg) | Stenungsunds IF (D1) | 100 |
| 24 | IFK Falköping (D4) | 0–1 | Skövde AIK (D2) | |
| 25 | Falköpings FK (D4) | 1–2 | Karlstad BK (D2) | 105 |
| 26 | Örebro SK Ungdom (D1) | 1–3 | Gunnilse IS (D1) | 226 |
| 27 | Västerås IK (D4) | 0–1 | Filipstads FF (D4) | |
| 28 | LSW IF (D4) | 3–2 | Hertzöga BK (D1) | 130 |
| 29 | Rottneros IK (D4) | 1–2 | Motala AIF FK (D1) | 201 |
| 30 | Östermalms IS (D4) | 2–3 | Nyköpings BIS (D2) | |
| 31 | BKV Norrtälje (D3) | 1–5 | IF Sylvia (D2) | |
| 32 | Gnesta FF (D3) | 1–2 | IFK Eskilstuna (D2) | |

| Tie no | Home team | Score | Away team | Attendance |
|---|---|---|---|---|
| 33 | FC Plavi Team (D2) | 3–1 | Degerfors IF (A) | 199 |
| 34 | Djurmo/Segro SK (D4) | 1–7 | Örebro SK FK (A) | 1,092 |
| 35 | Falu BS FK (D4) | 0–3 | IFK Stockholm (D3) | |
| 36 | Gestrike/Hammarby IF (D3) | 1–0 | IFK Västerås FK (D2) | |
| 37 | Essinge IK FK (D4) | 4–3 (gg) | Roslagsbro IF (D4) | |
| 38 | Visby IF Gute FK (D2) | 0–2 | IF Elfsborg (A) | 1,854 |
| 39 | Vallentuna BK (D2) | 3–2 | Enköpings SK FK (D1) | 45 |
| 40 | Älta IF (D4) | 1–2 | FC Café Opera (D2) | |
| 41 | Reymersholms IK (WC) | 4–2 | Håbo FF (D3) | |
| 42 | IK Bele (D4) | 2–7 | Hammarby IF (D1) | |
| 43 | Spånga IS FK (D3) | 1–3 | Hargs BK (D2) | |
| 44 | FoC Farsta (D3) | 0–1 | Östers IF (A) | 1,200 |
| 45 | Leksands IK FK (D4) | 1–3 | Assyriska Föreningen (D1) | 103 |
| 46 | IK Sirius FK (D2) | 1–0 (gg) | Spårvägens FF (D1) | 32 |
| 47 | Säters IF (D3) | 0–2 | Väsby IK FK (D2) | |
| 48 | Tyresö FF (D2) | 2–3 (gg) | Nacka FF (D1) | |
| 49 | IFK Våmhus (D4) | 0–4 | IK Brage (D1) | 450 |
| 50 | IFK Mora FK (D3) | 1–3 | Gefle IF (D1) | 229 |
| 51 | Enångers IK (D4) | 1–8 | GIF Sundsvall (D1) | 300 |
| 52 | Ljusdals IF (D4) | 0–11 | IFK Norrköping (A) | 2,000 |
| 53 | Domsjö IF (D4) | 0–0 (pen 4–3) | Harmångers IF (D4) | |
| 54 | Kubikenborgs IF (D4) | 1–5 | Obbola IK (D2) | |
| 55 | Täfteå IK (D3) | 0–2 | Djurgårdens IF (D1) | 490 |
| 56 | Krokom/Dvärsätts IF (D3) | 2–0 | Umedalens IF (D2) | |
| 57 | Skellefteå AIK (D2) | 3–7 | Umeå FC (D1) | 257 |
| 58 | Sunnanå SK (D3) | 1–8 | Gimonäs CK (D2) | |
| 59 | Alviks IK (D4) | 0–2 | Kiruna FF (D2) | |
| 60 | Assi IF (D3) | 0–1 | IFK Luleå (D1) | |
| 61 | Sandviks IK (D4) | 2–3 | IFK Kalix (D3) | |
| 62 | Malmbergets AIF (D3) | 2–1 (gg) | Bodens BK (D2) | |
| 63 | Hedens IF (D3) | 0–13 | AIK (A) | 1,221 |
| 64 | Notvikens IK (D4) | 0–3 | Västerås SK FK (A) | 350 |

== Third round ==
| Tie no | Home team | Score | Away team | Attendance |
|---|---|---|---|---|
| 1 | Ystads IF (D3) | 1–6 | Mjällby AIF (D1) | 198 |
| 2 | Falkenbergs FF (D1) | 0–3 | Halmstads BK (A) | 1,217 |
| 3 | Landskrona BoIS (D2) | 2–3 (gg) | IFK Hässleholm (D1) | 535 |
| 4 | Högaborgs BK (D2) | 1–1 (pen 4–3) | Malmö FF (A) | 1,310 |
| 5 | IF Leikin (D2) | 1–7 | Trelleborgs FF (A) | 102 |
| 6 | IFK Trelleborg (D2) | 0–3 | Helsingborgs IF (A) | 368 |
| 7 | Lundby IF (D2) | 2–1 | Vinbergs IF (D2) | |
| 8 | Lysekils FF (D2) | 0–2 | Västra Frölunda (D1) | 250 |
| 9 | Karlstad BK (D2) | 1–5 | Örgryte IS (A) | 406 |
| 10 | Skövde AIK (D2) | 0–3 | IFK Göteborg (A) | 4,104 |
| 11 | GAIS (D2) | 1–1 (pen 5–4) | IK Oddevold (D1) | 607 |
| 12 | Filipstads FF (D4) | 0–4 | Stenungsunds IF (D1) | 220 |
| 13 | IF Sylvia (D2) | 4–0 | Gunnilse IS (D1) | 160 |
| 14 | Malmslätts AIK (D4) | 4–2 | Assyriska Föreningen (D1) | 200 |
| 15 | LSW IF (D4) | 5–2 | Hargs BK (D2) | |
| 16 | Nyköpings BIS (D2) | 0–1 | Hammarby IF (D1) | 519 |

| Tie no | Home team | Score | Away team | Attendance |
|---|---|---|---|---|
| 17 | IFK Eskilstuna (D2) | 0–2 | IF Elfsborg (A) | 888 |
| 18 | FC Plavi Team (D2) | 2–0 | Motala AIF FK (D1) | 100 |
| 19 | FC Café Opera Djursholm (D2) | 0–3 | Nacka FF (D1) | 100 |
| 20 | Reymersholms IK (WC) | 0–2 | Vallentuna BK (D2) | |
| 21 | IFK Stockholm (D3) | 1–0 (gg) | IK Sirius FK (D2) | |
| 22 | Essinge IK FK (D4) | 0–3 | Väsby IK FK (D2) | |
| 23 | Gefle IF (D1) | 1–3 | IFK Norrköping (A) | 1,098 |
| 24 | Åtvidabergs FF (D1) | 1–2 | Östers IF (A) | 525 |
| 25 | Gestrike/Hammarby IF (D3) | 2–5 | Djurgårdens IF (D1) | 520 |
| 26 | IK Brage (D1) | 1–2 | Örebro SK FK (A) | 484 |
| 27 | Krokom/Dvärsätts IF (D3) | 1–4 | GIF Sundsvall (D1) | 150 |
| 28 | Domsjö IF (D4) | 1–6 | Umeå FC (D1) | 201 |
| 29 | IFK Kalix (D3) | 1–2 | Gimonäs CK (D2) | 243 |
| 30 | Obbola IK (D2) | 2–4 | AIK (A) | 2,300 |
| 31 | Malmbergets AIF (D3) | 1–3 | IFK Luleå (D1) | 120 |
| 32 | Kiruna FF (D2) | 1–7 | Västerås SK FK (A) | 300 |

== Fourth round ==
| Tie no | Home team | Score | Away team | Attendance |
|---|---|---|---|---|
| 1 | Vallentuna BK (D2) | 1–6 | Västerås SK (A) | 168 |
| 2 | IFK Luleå (D1) | 1–0 (gg) | IF Elfsborg (A) | 350 |
| 3 | Lundby IF (D2) | 3–4 | Västra Frölunda IF (D1) | 340 |
| 4 | Nacka FF (D1) | 0–2 | IFK Norrköping (A) | |
| 5 | GIF Sundsvall (D1) | 1–4 | Örgryte IS (A) | 140 |
| 6 | Väsby IK (D2) | 1–6 | Djurgårdens IF (D1) | 430 |
| 7 | IF Sylvia (D2) | 1–2 (gg) | Östers IF (A) | 200 |
| 8 | LSW IF (D4) | 1–2 | Stenungsunds IF (D1) | 250 |

| Tie no | Home team | Score | Away team | Attendance |
|---|---|---|---|---|
| 9 | Högaborgs BK (D2) | 0–2 | Halmstads BK (A) | 800 |
| 10 | Mjällby AIF (D1) | 1–2 | Helsingborgs IF (A) | 718 |
| 11 | Malmslätts AIK (D4) | 1–2 | Örebro SK (A) | 500 |
| 12 | IFK Hässleholm (D1) | 1–2 (gg) | Trelleborgs FF (A) | 212 |
| 13 | IFK Stockholm (D3) | 0–9 | Hammarby IF (D1) | 600 |
| 14 | GAIS (D2) | 1–3 | IFK Göteborg (A) | 3,769 |
| 15 | FC Plavi Team (D2) | 0–9 | AIK (A) | 472 |
| 16 | Gimonäs CK (D2) | 0–8 | Umeå FC (D1) | 462 |

== Fifth round ==
The 8 matches in this round were played between 28 March and 4 April 1998.

| Tie no | Home team | Score | Away team | Attendance |
|---|---|---|---|---|
| 1 | Halmstads BK (A) | 0–1 | IFK Norrköping (A) | 962 |
| 2 | Hammarby IF (D1) | 3–1 | Östers IF (A) | 2,722 |
| 3 | Helsingborgs IF (A) | 4–3 (gg) | Västra Frölunda IF (D1) | 2,121 |
| 4 | Trelleborgs FF (A) | 0–1 | Stenungsunds IF (D1) | 474 |
| 5 | Örebro SK (A) | 1–3 | IFK Göteborg (A) | 2,433 |
| 6 | Örgryte IS (A) | 2–1 | AIK (A) | 427 |
| 7 | Umeå FC (D1) | 1–2 (gg) | IFK Luleå (D1) | 320 |
| 8 | Västerås SK (A) | 0–1 | Djurgårdens IF (D1) | 921 |

== Quarter-finals ==
The 4 matches in this round were played between 8 April and 20 April 1998.

| Tie no | Home team | Score | Away team | Attendance |
|---|---|---|---|---|
| 1 | Hammarby IF (D1) | 5–0 | IFK Norrköping (A) | 4,589 |
| 2 | Helsingborgs IF (A) | 2–1 | Stenungsunds IF (D1) | 3,824 |
| 3 | Djurgårdens IF (D1) | 6–0 | IFK Luleå (D1) | 1,512 |
| 4 | IFK Göteborg (A) | 1–2 | Örgryte IS (A) | 4,074 |

== Semi-finals ==
The semi-finals were played on 7 May 1998.

| Tie no | Home team | Score | Away team | Attendance |
|---|---|---|---|---|
| 1 | Djurgårdens IF (D1) | 0–2 | Helsingborgs IF (A) | 2,871 |
| 2 | Örgryte IS (A) | 2–1 | Hammarby IF (D1) | 1,583 |

== Final ==
The final was played on 14 May 1998 in Gothenburg and the replay on 21 May 1998 in Helsingborg.

| Tie no | Team 1 | Score | Team 2 | Attendance |
|---|---|---|---|---|
| 1 | Örgryte IS (A) | 1–1 | Helsingborgs IF (A) | 2,559 |
| replay | Helsingborgs IF (A) | 1–1 (p. 3–0) | Örgryte IS (A) | 13,092 |
