= FFK =

FFK may refer to:

- Curaçao Football Federation (Papiamento: Federashon Futbòl Kòrsou)
- Faye Fang Kaew, a Thai pop trio
- Falköpings FK, a Swedish football club
- Finnmark, a county of Norway
- Football Federation of Kazakhstan
- Football Federation of Kosovo
- Fredrikstad FK, a Norwegian football club
