= Mikael Nilsson (footballer, born 1967) =

Swedish footballer

Personal information
- Full name: Per Mikael Christian Nilsson
- Date of birth: 16 June 1967 (age 59)
- Position: Centre-back

Senior career*
| Years | Team | Apps | (Gls) |
| 1985–1990 | Tyresö FF | 111 | (13) |
| 1991–1995 | Djurgården | 98 | (1) |
| Total | | 209 | (14) |
- * Club domestic league appearances and goals

Per Mikael Christian Nilsson (born 16 June 1967) is a Swedish former professional footballer who played as a centre-back for Tyresö FF and Djurgårdens IF. He made 52 Allsvenskan appearances for Djurgården.
