= Skellefteå FF =

Swedish football club

- Full name: Skellefteå Förenade Fotbollsföreningar
- Founded: 1921; 105 years ago (as Skellefteå AIK Fotboll)
- Ground: Norrvalla IP; Skellefteå; Sweden
- Capacity: 1,500
- Chairman: Christer Lindgren
- Manager: Ali Hussein
- League: Division 2 Norrland
- 2019: Division 2 Norrland, 4th
- Website: skellefteaff.se
Home colours	Away colours

Skellefteå FF is a football club based in Skellefteå, Västerbotten, Sweden. The club was founded in 1921, and was then called Skellefteå AIK Fotboll, a name it kept until 2006. In the 2015 season, the club plays in the Division 2 Norrland league.

== Background ==
The name Skellefteå AIK Football was changed to Skellefteå Förenade Fotbollsföreningar in January 2006. The background is a project that was initiated in 2005 to establish a football team as high up the Swedish football league system as possible. The Sunnanå SK, Morön BK and Skellefteå AIK clubs are included in the project.

Skelleftea FF's A-team has brought together the best players from the various member clubs. In 2009 the club played in the Division 1 Norra for the first time but unfortunately finished bottom of the table and were relegated back to Division 2 Norrland.

The club is affiliated to the Västerbottens Fotbollförbund.

== Season to season ==
Season	Level	Division	Section	Position	Movements
1993	Tier 3	Division 2	Norrland	2nd	Promotion Playoffs
1994	Tier 3	Division 2	Norrland	3rd	
1995	Tier 3	Division 2	Norrland	6th	
1996	Tier 3	Division 2	Norrland	7th	
1997	Tier 3	Division 2	Norrland	2nd	Promotion Playoffs
1998	Tier 3	Division 2	Norrland	4th	
1999	Tier 3	Division 2	Norrland	5th	
2000	Tier 3	Division 2	Norrland	6th	
2001	Tier 3	Division 2	Norrland	4th	
2002	Tier 3	Division 2	Norrland	9th	
2003	Tier 3	Division 2	Norrland	9th	
2004	Tier 3	Division 2	Norrland	11th	Relegated
2005	Tier 4	Division 3	Norra Norrland	1st	Promoted
2006*	Tier 4	Division 2	Norrland	4th	
2007	Tier 4	Division 2	Norrland	4th	
2008	Tier 4	Division 2	Norrland	1st	Promoted
2009	Tier 3	Division 1	Norra	14th	Relegated
2010	Tier 4	Division 2	Norrland	2nd	
2011	Tier 4	Division 2	Norrland	5th	
2012	Tier 4	Division 2	Norrland	6th	
2013	Tier 4	Division 2	Norrland	1st	Promoted
2014	Tier 3	Division 1	Norra	14th	Relegated
2015	Tier 4	Division 2	Norrland	6th	
2016	Tier 4	Division 2	Norrland	8th	
2017	Tier 4	Division 2	Norrland	1st	Promoted
2018	Tier 3	Division 1	Norra	14th	Relegated

* League restructuring in 2006 resulted in a new division being created at Tier 3 and subsequent divisions dropping a level.
