= Östergötlands Fotbollförbund =

- Abbreviation: Östergötlands FF
- Purpose: District Football Association
- Headquarters: Idrottens Hus
- Location(s): Vidingsjö Linköping Östergötland County Sweden
- Chairman: Gillis Persson
- Website: ostergotland.svenskfotboll.se

The Östergötlands Fotbollförbund (Östergötland Football Association) is one of the 24 district organisations of the Swedish Football Association. It administers lower tier football in Östergötland County.

== Background ==
Östergötlands Fotbollförbund, commonly referred to as Östergötlands FF, is the governing body for football in the county of Östergötland. The Association currently has 156 member clubs. Based in Linköping, the Association's Chairman is Gillis Persson.

== Affiliated Members ==
The following clubs are affiliated to the Östergötlands FF:

- AC Studenterna
- Assyriska Föreningen i Norrköping
- Azech Syrianska Föreningen
- Babel FF
- Bjälbo IF
- Bjärka-Säby GoIF
- Björsäters SK
- BK Derby
- BK Derby Ungdom
- BK Hird
- BK Kenty
- BK Linköping
- BK Ljungsbro
- BK Tinnis
- BK Vingen
- BK Zeros
- Boets IK
- Borens IK
- Borensbergs IF FK
- Borggårds IK
- Borghamns IF
- Boxholms IF
- Bråvalla IK
- Brokinds IF
- Chile Unido IF
- Club de Futsal Xeneizes
- Dagsbergs IF
- Degerön-Godegårds IF
- Ekängens IF
- Eneby BK
- Fågelsta AIF
- Falerums IF
- FC Linköping United
- FC Norrköping
- FC Syrianska Linköping
- FC Vasastan
- FF Jaguar
- Finspångs AIK
- Finspångs FK
- FK Linköping
- Fornåsa IF
- Gammalkils IF
- Grebo IK
- Grytgöls IK
- Gusums IF
- Hagahöjdens BK
- Hageby IF
- Hägerstads IF
- Hannäs IF
- Hästholmens IF
- Hävla SK
- Hemgårdarnas BK
- Hjulsbro IK
- Horn-Hycklinge IF
- IBall FC
- IF Kneippen
- IF Sylvia
- IF Trym
- IFK Motala FK
- IFK Norrköping DFK
- IFK Norrköping FK
- IFK Wreta Kloster
- Igelfors IF
- IK Klockaretorpet
- IK Österviking
- IK Östria Lambohov
- IK Sjöge
- IK Sleipner
- IK Waria
- IKF Bosna i Hercegovina Linköping
- Karle IF
- Kättinge IF
- KFUM Trix
- Kimstad GoIF
- Kisa BK
- Kisa United BK
- Klockrike AIF
- Kristbergs IF
- Krokeks IF
- Kuddby IF
- Kurdiska FF Linköping
- Kvarsebo IK
- Lambohovs FF
- LBK Gottfridsberg
- Ledbergs IF
- Lindö FC
- Lindö FF
- Linghems SK
- Linköping Kenty DFF
- Linköping Universitets Akademiska IF FK
- Linköpings FC
- Linköpings FF Ungdom
- Ljusfallshammar SK
- Loddby IF
- Lotorps IF
- LSW IF
- Malexanders IF
- Malmens FF
- Malmslätts AIK
- Mantorps FF
- Medevi IF
- Mjölby AI FF
- Mjölby AI UF
- Mjölby SK
- Mjölby Södra IF
- Motala AIF FK
- Normlösa IF
- Norrköping City DFF
- Norrköping Futsal Klubb
- Norrköpings FF
- Norsholms IF
- Reijmyre IF
- Rimforsa IF
- Ringarums IF
- Rök-Svanshals IK
- S:t Kuryakos IF
- Saltängens BK
- Simonstorps IF
- Skärblacka IF
- Skarphagens IK
- Skeninge IK
- Slätmons BK
- Smedby AIS
- Söderköpings IK
- Södra IF Linköping
- Sonstorps IK
- Stegeborgs IF
- Stjärnorps SK
- Strålsnäs FF
- Sturefors IF
- Svärtinge SK
- Syrianska KF i Norrköping
- Tallboda IF
- Tannefors IF
- Tjällmo IF
- Torstorps IF
- Väderstads IK
- Vadstena GIF
- Valdemarsviks IF
- Vallerstads IF
- Vånga IF
- Västerlösa GoIF
- Västra Caféet BK
- Västra Harg IF
- Västra Husby IF
- Vidingsjö MoIF
- Vikingstads SK
- Åbackarna BK
- Åby IF
- Åtvidabergs FF
- Åtvidabergs Södra IK
- Ödeshögs IK
- Örtomta GoIS
- Österstads IF
- Östra Ryds IF

== League Competitions ==
Östergötlands FF run the following League Competitions:

=== Men's Football ===
Division 4 - two sections
Division 5 - three sections
Division 6 - four sections

=== Women's Football ===
Division 3 - one section
Division 4 - two section
Division 5 - two sections
