= Tyresö FF (men) =

Swedish football club

- Full name: Tyresö Fotbollsförening
- Founded: 1971
- Ground: Tyresövallen; Tyresö; Sweden
- Chairman: Hans Lindberg
- Head coach: Jan-Ove Rivelsrud
- League: Division 2 Södra Svealand
- 2019: Division 2 Södra Svealand, 10th
Home colours	Away colours

Tyresö FF is a Swedish men's association football team in Tyresö, a municipality in Stockholm County. They are associated with the Tyresö FF women's team, which plays in the top tier of the Damallsvenskan. The men's team currently play in the Swedish Division 3.

== Background ==
Tyresö Fotbollsförening was founded in 1971. Since their foundation Tyresö FF men's team has participated mainly in the middle divisions of the Swedish football league system, their high points being second tier football in 1985 in Division 2 Norra and in 1990 in Division 1 Norra. On each occasion their stay in the second tier was short-lived and they were relegated at the end of the season. The club currently plays in Division 3 Östra Svealand which is the fifth tier of Swedish football. They play their home matches at the Tyresövallen in Tyresö.

Tyresö FF are affiliated to the Stockholms Fotbollförbund.

== Futsal ==
A great achievement for Tyresö FF was winning the 2003/2004 Swedish Futsal Championship.

== Current squad ==
As of 7 January 2015.

Note: Flags indicate national team as defined under FIFA eligibility rules; some limited exceptions apply. Players may hold more than one non-FIFA nationality.

No.	Pos.	Nation	Player
—	GK	SWE	Oskar Mellanmyr
—	GK	SWE	Abdoulaye Joof
—	DF	SWE	Christoffer Bocelli
—	DF	SWE	David Kovalsky
—	DF	SWE	Jesper Eleby
—	DF	SWE	Jesper Falk
—	DF	SWE	Jimmy Lekberg
—	DF	SWE	Lucas Brikell
—	DF	SWE	Mattias Andersson
—	DF	SWE	Niclas Kembel
—	DF	SWE	Robert Fredriksson
—	DF	PER	Sebastian Hernandez Valencia
—	DF	SWE	Sebastian Junior Håkansson
—	DF	SWE	Viktor Nilsson

No.	Pos.	Nation	Player
—	MF	SWE	Alleu Badou Jallow
—	MF	SWE	Andreas Söderstedt
—	MF	SWE	Jonathan Avernäs
—	MF	SWE	Jonathan Salvo Silva
—	MF	SWE	Mikael Hammarstedt
—	MF	SWE	Niclas Thomasson
—	MF	SWE	Philip Ringbom
—	FW	SWE	Burhan Khalif
—	FW	SWE	Henrik Lindström
—	FW	SWE	Jonathan Silveira
—	FW	SWE	Osei Worae
—	FW	SWE	Piotr Piotrowicz
—	FW	SWE	Pontus Lithen

== Season to season ==
Season	Level	Division	Section	Position	Movements
1993	Tier 4	Division 3	Östra Svealand	2nd	Promotion Playoffs – Promoted
1994	Tier 3	Division 2	Östra Svealand	4th	
1995	Tier 3	Division 2	Östra Svealand	2nd	Promotion Playoffs
1996	Tier 3	Division 2	Östra Svealand	4th	
1997	Tier 3	Division 2	Västra Svealand	4th	
1998	Tier 3	Division 2	Västra Svealand	2nd	Promotion Playoffs
1999	Tier 3	Division 2	Östra Svealand	5th	
2000	Tier 3	Division 2	Östra Svealand	4th	
2001	Tier 3	Division 2	Östra Svealand	10th	Relegation Playoffs – Relegated
2002	Tier 4	Division 3	Östra Svealand	1st	Promoted
2003	Tier 3	Division 2	Östra Svealand	10th	Relegation Playoffs
2004	Tier 3	Division 2	Östra Svealand	12th	Relegated
2005	Tier 4	Division 3	Östra Svealand	5th	
2006*	Tier 5	Division 3	Östra Svealand	9th	Relegation Playoffs
2007	Tier 4	Division 2	Östra Svealand	12th	Relegated
2008	Tier 5	Division 3	Södra Svealand	7th	
2009	Tier 5	Division 3	Södra Svealand	4th	
2010	Tier 5	Division 3	Östra Svealand	4th	
2011	Tier 5	Division 3	Östra Svealand	9th	Relegation Playoffs
2012	Tier 5	Division 3	Södra Svealand	5th	

* League restructuring in 2006 resulted in a new division being created at Tier 3 and subsequent divisions dropping a level.

== Attendances ==
In recent seasons Tyresö FF have had the following average attendances:

Season	Average attendance	Division / Section	Level
2007	137	Div 2 Östra Svealand	Tier 4
2008	72	Div 3 Södra Svealand	Tier 5
2009	74	Div 3 Östra Svealand	Tier 5
2010	104	Div 3 Östra Svealand	Tier 5
2011	129	Div 3 Östra Svealand	Tier 5
2012	94	Div 3 Södra Svealand	Tier 5

* Attendances are provided in the Publikliga sections of the Svenska Fotbollförbundet website.
