= Enånger =

- Location within Sweden Gävleborg Location within Sweden
- Coordinates: 61°32′50″N 17°00′10″E
- Country: Sweden
- Province: Hälsingland
- County: Gävleborg County
- Municipality: Hudiksvall Municipality

Area
  - Total: 1.6 km^{2} (0.62 sq mi)

Population (31 December 2018)
  - Total: 629
  - Density: 394/km^{2} (1,020/sq mi)
- Time zone: UTC+1 (CET)
  - Summer (DST): UTC+2 (CEST)

Enånger is a locality situated in Hudiksvall Municipality, Gävleborg County, Sweden with 629 inhabitants in 2018.

Enånger Court District, or Enångers tingslag, was a district of Hälsingland in Sweden. The provinces in Norrland were never divided into hundreds and instead the court district (tingslag) served as the basic division of rural areas.

== Sports ==
The following sports clubs are situated in Enånger:

- Enångers IK
