= Västergötlands Fotbollförbund =

Association football district association in Sweden

- Abbreviation: Västergötlands FF
- Formation: 17 March 1918
- Purpose: District Football Association
- Headquarters: Torggatan 8
- Location(s): Box 383 54128 Skövde Västra Götaland County Sweden
- Chairman: Magnus Gunnarsson
- Website: www.vastgotafotboll.org

The Västergötlands Fotbollförbund (Västergötland Football Association) is one of the 24 district organisations of the Swedish Football Association. It administers lower tier football in the historical province of Västergötland.

== Background ==
Västergötlands Fotbollförbund, commonly referred to as Västergötlands FF, is the governing body for football in the historical province of Västergötland, which partly corresponds with the area now covered by Västra Götaland County. The Association was founded on 17 March 1918 and currently has 279 member clubs. Based in Skövde, the Association's Chairman is Magnus Gunnarsson.

== Affiliated Members ==
The following clubs are affiliated to the Västergötlands FF:

- Alingsås FK
- Alingsås IF
- Alingsås Internationella FF
- Alingsås Kvinnliga IK
- Alvhems IK
- Ambjörnarps IF
- Annelunds IF
- Aplareds IF
- Ardala GoIF
- Arentorp Helås FK
- Arentorps SK
- Axvalls IF
- Bergdalens IK
- Björketorps IF
- Björsäters IF
- BK Spark
- BK Trix
- Bollebygds IF
- Borås AIK
- Borås GIF
- Borås Kings Idrottsförening
- Borgstena IF
- Borgunda IK
- Bosna FC
- Brämhults IK
- Bredareds IF
- Byttorps FC
- Byttorps IF
- Dalsjöfors GoIF
- Dalstorps IF
- Dannike IK
- Dardania IF
- DIF Holmalund
- DIK Friscopojkarna
- Edsvära/N.Vånga FF
- Ekedalens SK
- Elmer-Fåglum FK
- Essunga IS
- Fagersanna IF
- Fåglums IF
- Falköping United FC
- Falköpings DIK
- Falköpings FK
- Falköpings Kvinnliga IK
- FC Corner
- FC Gauthiod
- FC Kabel Åttio
- FC Lockryd
- FC Södra Ryd
- FC Trollhättan
- FK Yugo
- Floby IF
- Folkabo IK
- Forsviks IF
- Främmestads IK
- Fristads GoIF
- Fritsla IF
- Fröjereds IF
- Futsal Club Tranan
- Gällstads AIS
- Gällstads FK
- Gällstads IF
- Gånghester SK
- Gerdskens BK
- Göta BK
- Götene IF
- Grimsås IF
- Grolanda IF
- Grönahögs IK
- Gullspångs IF
- Håcksviks IF
- Hajoms IF
- Håkantorps IS
- Hällekis IF
- Hällstads IF
- Halvorstorps IS
- Hangelösa IF
- Härlunda IF
- Hassle-Torsö GoIF
- Håvens IF
- Hedareds BK
- Hemsjö IF
- Herrljunga SK FK
- Hestrafors IF
- Hillareds IF
- Hjärtums IS
- Högvads BK
- Holmalunds IF Alingsås
- Hols IF
- Holsljunga IF
- Hörnebo FC
- Hörnebo SK
- Horreds IF
- Hössna IF
- Hova IF
- Hudene GoIF
- Hyssna IF
- IF Elfsborg
- IF Heimer
- IF Knallen
- IF Olsfors
- IF Tymer
- IF Weimer Lyrestad
- IFK Emtunga
- IFK Falköping FF
- IFK Hjo
- IFK Mariestad
- IFK Örby
- IFK Öxnevalla
- IFK Skövde FK
- IFK Tidaholm
- IFK Trollhättan
- IFK Värsås
- Igelstorps IK
- IK Elmer
- IK Friscopojkarna
- IK Gauthiod
- Inlands IF
- Järpås IS
- Jula BK
- Jung/Kvänum IF
- Kållandsö GoIF
- Källby IF
- Kindaholms FF
- Kinna IF
- Kinnahults IF
- Kinnarp-Slutarps IF
- Kinne-Vedums FK
- Kinne-Vedums IF
- Korsberga IF
- Kronängs IF
- Långareds BoIS
- Länghems IF
- Larvs FK
- Lerdala IF
- Levene/Skogslunds IF
- Lidköpings IF
- Lidköpings FK
- Lidköping United
- Lilla Edets IF
- Limmareds IF
- Ljungsarps IF
- Lödöse Nygård IK
- Lundsbrunns IF
- Magra IS
- Målsryds IF
- Månstads IF
- Marbäcks IF
- Mariedals IK
- Mariestads BK
- Mariestads BoIS DFF
- Mariestads BoIS FF
- Mellby IK
- Mjöbäcks GOIF
- Moholms SK
- Mölltorp/Breviks AIF
- Mullsjö IF
- Nittorps IK
- Norra Fågelås IF
- Norra Härene BK
- Norrby Futsal Club
- Norrby IF
- Norrmalms IK
- Nossebro IF
- Ods FF
- Pars IF
- Rackeby IK
- Rackeby KIK
- Råda BK
- Råda DBK
- Rångedala IK
- Redvägs FK
- Roasjö IF
- Rydals GIF
- Rydboholms SK
- Ryrs Allmänna IF
- Saleby IF
- Sandareds IF
- Sandhems IF
- Sandhults SK
- Sätila SK
- Sävens BK
- Serbisk-Svensk KIF
- Sexdrega IF
- Sils DIF
- Sils IF
- Sjömarkens IF
- Sjötofta IF
- Sjuntorps IF
- SK Mjörn
- Skara FC
- Skara IF
- Skara Kvinnliga Idrottsklubb
- Skarke KIK Varnhem
- Skene IF
- Skene IF 09
- Skepplanda BTK
- Skoftebyns DIF
- Skoftebyns IF
- Skogslunds IF
- Skövde AIK
- Skövde Kvinnliga IK
- Skultorps IF
- Södra Härene IF
- Södra Vings IF
- Sollebrunns AIK
- Somali FF
- Söne SK
- Sparsörs AIK
- Stenstorps IF
- Stora Levene IK
- Stora Mellby SK
- Svenljunga IK
- Svenska Suryoyo Föreningen
- Team Ted Futsal Club
- Tibro AIK FK
- Tidaholms GoIF
- Tidans IF
- Tidavads IF
- Tigris IF
- Timmele GoIF
- Töllsjö IF
- Tomtens IF
- Töreboda IK
- Torestorp/Älekulla FF
- Torestorps IF
- Torsö Bygdegårds och IF
- Trädets IF
- Tranemo IF
- Transcom FC Borås
- Trässbergs BK
- Tråvads IF
- Trollhättans BoIS
- Trollhättans FF
- Trollhättans FK
- Trollhättans IF
- Trolmens SK
- Tuns IK
- Tvärred/Vegby FC
- Tvärreds IF
- Ubbhults IF
- Uddebo GoIF
- Ulricehamns IFK
- Ulvåkers FC
- Ulvåkers IF
- Undenäs IF
- Upphärads IS
- Valtorps IF
- Våmbs IF
- Vänersborgs FK
- Vänersborgs IF
- Vänga BK
- Vara SK
- Vårgårda IK
- Värings GoIF
- Varnhems IF
- Vartofta SK
- Västerlanda GOIF
- Vedums AIS
- Vegby SK
- Vilske-Kleva BK
- Vinninga AIF
- Viskafors IF
- Vretens BK
- Wargöns IK
- Wästerhov IK
- Åsaka SK
- Åsarps IF
- Åsarp-Trädet FK
- Åsunden FK
- Älekulla IF
- Älgarås SK
- Äspereds IF
- Örby FC
- Örslösa IF
- Östadkulle SK
- Östra Frölunda IF
- Öxabäcks IF

== League Competitions ==
Västergötlands FF run the following League Competitions:

=== Men's Football ===
Division 4 - three sections
Division 5 - six sections
Division 6 - six sections

=== Women's Football ===
Division 3 - two sections
Division 4 - three sections
Division 5 - five sections
