= Skepplanda BTK =

Swedish football club

- Full name: Skepplanda Bordtennisklubb
- Founded: 5 February 1948
- Ground: Forsvallen; Skepplanda; Sweden
- League: Division 5 Västergötland Västra

Skepplanda BTK is a Swedish sports club located in Skepplanda.

The club nowadays mainly practices football, but earlier also competed in handball, gymnastics and table tennis.

The men's handball team played Division 2 in 1982. The women's soccer team played Division 1 between 2014 and 2014.

== Background ==
Skepplanda BTK currently plays in Division 5 Västergötland Västra which is the seventh tier of Swedish football. They play their home matches at the Forsvallen in Skepplanda.

The club is affiliated to Västergötlands Fotbollförbund.
