= Sidensjö IK =

Swedish sports club

- Full name: Sidensjö idrottsklubb
- Sport: soccer, track and field athletics, gymnastics, orienteering, skiing
- Founded: 1921
- Based in: Sidensjö, Sweden
- Ballpark: Sidensjö IP

Sidensjö IK is a sports club in Sidensjö, Sweden. The club was established in 1921 and runs soccer, track and field athletics, gymnastics, orienteering and skiing.

The women’s soccer team played five seasons in the Swedish top division between 1978 and 1986.
