= Holmalunds IF =

Swedish football club

- Full name: Holmalunds Idrottsförening Alingsås
- Founded: 1933
- Ground: Brogårdsvallen; Alingsås; Sweden
- Capacity: 3,000
- Chairman: Per Ohlsson
- Head coach: Teddy Lučić
- Coach: Magnus Berg; Peter Östlind; Roger "Milla" Jonsson
- League: Division 3 Mellersta Götaland
- 2010: Division 2 Västra Götaland, 12th (Relegated)
Home colours	Away colours

Holmalunds IF is a Swedish football club located in Alingsås.

== Background ==
Since their foundation in 1933 Holmalunds IF has participated mainly in the middle and lower divisions of the Swedish football league system. The club currently plays in Division 3 Mellersta Götaland which is the fourth tier of Swedish football. They play their home matches at the Brogårdsvallen in Alingsås.

The team's colors are red and white and the team is sometimes called "Holmen". Holmalunds IF are affiliated to the Västergötlands Fotbollförbund.

== Season to season ==
Season	Level	Division	Section	Position	Movements
1993	Tier 3	Division 2	Västra Götaland	8th	
1994	Tier 3	Division 2	Västra Götaland	8th	
1995	Tier 3	Division 2	Västra Götaland	3rd	
1996	Tier 3	Division 2	Västra Götaland	4th	
1997	Tier 3	Division 2	Västra Götaland	10th	Relegation Playoffs
1998	Tier 3	Division 2	Västra Götaland	4th	
1999	Tier 3	Division 2	Västra Götaland	11th	Relegated
2000	Tier 4	Division 3	Mellersta Götaland	2nd	Promotion Playoffs
2001	Tier 4	Division 3	Mellersta Götaland	12th	Relegated
2002	Tier 5	Division 4	Västergötland Västra	2nd	Promotion Playoffs
2003	Tier 5	Division 4	Västergötland Södra	3rd	
2004	Tier 5	Division 4	Västergötland Västra	1st	Promoted
2005	Tier 4	Division 3	Mellersta Götaland	4th	Playoffs
2006*	Tier 5	Division 3	Mellersta Götaland	3rd	
2007	Tier 5	Division 3	Mellersta Götaland	2nd	Promotion Playoffs
2008	Tier 5	Division 3	Nordvästra Götaland	5th	
2009	Tier 5	Division 3	Nordvästra Götaland	1st	Promoted
2010	Tier 4	Division 2	Västra Götaland	12th	Relegated
2011	Tier 5	Division 3	Mellersta Götaland	6th	

* League restructuring in 2006 resulted in a new division being created at Tier 3 and subsequent divisions dropping a level.

== Current Squad for the 2011 Season ==
Note: Flags indicate national team as defined under FIFA eligibility rules; some limited exceptions apply. Players may hold more than one non-FIFA nationality.

No.	Pos.	Nation	Player
1	GK	SWE	Daniel Andersson
4	DF	SWE	Robert Kovacevic
5	MF	SWE	Christoffer Ängberg
6	MF	SWE	Andreas Johansson
7	DF	SWE	Marcus Heed
8	MF	SWE	Anthon Gustavsson (captain)
9	FW	SWE	Anton Stenseke
10	MF	SWE	Jacob Borg
11	MF	SWE	Andreas Benjaminsson
12	DF	SWE	Daniel Svensson

No.	Pos.	Nation	Player
13	FW	SWE	Johan Nilsson
14	DF	SWE	Albin Ekman
15	DF	SWE	Oscar Sjögren
16	MF	SWE	Oliver Östlind
18	DF	SWE	Sebastian Bülow-Andersson
19	MF	SWE	André Nilsson
20	MF	SWE	Alexander Johansson
22	GK	SWE	Niclas Prytz
24	GK	SWE	Carl-Johan Skoglöv
