= FC Krukan =

Swedish football club

- Full name: Fotboll Club Krukan
- Founded: 1991
- Ground: Zinkensdamms IP; Stockholm; Sweden
- League: Division 4 Stockholm Mellersta
Home colours	Away colours

FC Krukan is a Swedish football club located in Stockholm.

== Background ==
FC Krukan currently plays in Division 4 Stockholm Mellersta which is the sixth tier of Swedish football. They play their home matches at the Zinkensdamms IP in Stockholm.

The club is affiliated to Stockholms Fotbollförbund.

== Season to season ==
Season	Level	Division	Section	Position	Movements
2006*	Tier 7	Division 5	Stockholm Mellersta	2nd	Promoted
2007	Tier 6	Division 4	Stockholm Mellersta	9th	
2008	Tier 6	Division 4	Stockholm Mellersta	8th	
2009	Tier 6	Division 4	Stockholm Mellersta	9th	
2010	Tier 6	Division 4	Stockholm Mellersta	7th	
2011	Tier 6	Division 4	Stockholm Mellersta		

* League restructuring in 2006 resulted in a new division being created at Tier 3 and subsequent divisions dropping a level.
