= Lindö FF =

Swedish football club

- Full name: Lindö Fotbollförening
- Founded: 2022
- Ground: City Gross arena Norrköping; Sweden
- Chairman: Tomas Silén
- League: Division 4 Östergötland Östra
Home colours	Away colours

Lindö FF is a Swedish football club located in Norrköping.

== Background ==
Lindö FF currently plays in Division 4 Östergötland Östra which is the sixth tier of Swedish football. They play their home matches at the City Gross arena in Norrköping.

The club is affiliated to Östergötlands Fotbollförbund. Lindö FF played in the 2008 Svenska Cupen but lost 0–4 at home to Syrianska FC in the first round.

== Season to season ==
Season	Level	Division	Section	Position	Movements
1993	Tier 5	Division 4	Östergötland Östra	8th	
1994	Tier 5	Division 4	Östergötland Östra	6th	
1995	Tier 5	Division 4	Östergötland Östra	8th	
1996	Tier 5	Division 4	Östergötland Östra	1st	Promoted
1997	Tier 4	Division 3	Nordöstra Götaland	12th	Relegated
1998	Tier 5	Division 4	Östergötland Östra	4th	
1999	Tier 5	Division 4	Östergötland Östra	1st	Promoted
2000	Tier 4	Division 3	Nordöstra Götaland	10th	Relegated
2001	Tier 5	Division 4	Östergötland Östra	11th	
2002	Tier 5	Division 4	Östergötland Östra	2nd	Promotion Playoffs
2003	Tier 5	Division 4	Östergötland Östra	5th	
2004	Tier 5	Division 4	Östergötland Östra	7th	
2005	Tier 5	Division 4	Östergötland Östra	5th	
2006*	Tier 6	Division 4	Östergötland Östra	1st	Promoted
2007	Tier 5	Division 3	Nordöstra Götaland	1st	Promoted
2008	Tier 4	Division 2	Östra Götaland	11th	Relegated
2009	Tier 5	Division 3	Nordöstra Götaland	10th	Relegated
2010	Tier 6	Division 4	Östergötland Östra	2nd	Promotion Playoffs
2011	Tier 6	Division 4	Östergötland Östra	1st	Promoted

* League restructuring in 2006 resulted in a new division being created at Tier 3 and subsequent divisions dropping a level.
