= Skoftebyns IF =

Swedish football club

- Full name: Skoftebyns Idrottsförening
- Founded: 1950
- Ground: Nysätra IP; Trollhättan; Sweden
- Chairman: Åke Tidbeck
- League: Division 3 Mellersta Götaland
- 2018: Division 2 Norra Götaland, 12th (Relegation Playoffs - Relegated)
Home colours	Away colours

Skoftebyns IF is a Swedish football club located in Trollhättan in Västra Götaland County.

== Background ==
Since their foundation Skoftebyns IF has participated in the middle and lower divisions of the Swedish football league system. The club currently plays in Division 2 Norra Götaland which is the fourth tier of Swedish football. They play their home matches at the Nysätra IP in Trollhättan.

Skoftebyns IF are affiliated to the Västergötlands Fotbollförbund.

== Season to season ==
Season	Level	Division	Section	Position	Movements
1999	Tier 5	Division 4	Västergötland Västra	5th	
2000	Tier 5	Division 4	Västergötland Västra	6th	
2001	Tier 5	Division 4	Västergötland Västra	11th	Relegated
2002	Tier 6	Division 5	Västergötland Nordvästra	4th	
2003	Tier 6	Division 5	Västergötland Västra	5th	
2004	Tier 6	Division 5	Västergötland Nordvästra	4th	
2005	Tier 6	Division 5	Västergötland Västra	4th	
2006*	Tier 7	Division 5	Västergötland Västra	1st	Promoted
2007	Tier 6	Division 4	Västergötland Västra	2nd	Promotion Playoffs – Promoted
2008	Tier 5	Division 3	Nordvästra Götaland	2nd	Promotion Playoffs
2009	Tier 5	Division 3	Nordvästra Götaland	4th	
2010	Tier 5	Division 3	Nordvästra Götaland	1st	Promoted
2011	Tier 4	Division 2	Norra Götaland	11th	Relegated
2012	Tier 5	Division 3	Nordvästra Götaland	2nd	Promotion Playoffs
2013	Tier 5	Division 3	Nordvästra Götaland	3rd	
2014	Tier 5	Division 3	Nordvästra Götaland	3rd	
2015	Tier 5	Division 3	Nordvästra Götaland	1st	Promoted

* League restructuring in 2006 resulted in a new division being created at Tier 3 and subsequent divisions dropping a level.

== Attendances ==
In recent seasons Skoftebyns IF have had the following average attendances:

Season	Average attendance	Division / Section	Level
2007	Not available	Div 4 Västergötland Västra	Tier 6
2008	284	Div 3 Nordvästra Götaland	Tier 5
2009	282	Div 3 Nordvästra Götaland	Tier 5
2010	369	Div 3 Nordvästra Götaland	Tier 5
2011	295	Div 2 Norra Götaland	Tier 4
2012	284	Div 3 Nordvästra Götaland	Tier 5
2013	372	Div 3 Nordvästra Götaland	Tier 5
2014	246	Div 3 Nordvästra Götaland	Tier 5
2015	202	Div 3 Nordvästra Götaland	Tier 5

* Attendances are provided in the Publikliga sections of the Svenska Fotbollförbundet website.

The former goalkeeper Mats Johansson began his career in Skoftebyn and later went to top league team IF Elfsborg and BK Häcken where he still reside as a goalkeepercoach.
