= IF Heimer =

Swedish football club

- Full name: Idrottsföreningen Heimer
- Founded: 1906
- Ground: Framnäs IP; Lidköping; Sweden
- League: Defunct
Home colours	Away colours

IF Heimer was a Swedish football club located in Lidköping in Lidköping Municipality, Västra Götaland County.

== Background ==
IF Heimer was a sports club from Lidköping that was founded by several young men in the town on 18 March 1906.

Since their foundation IF Heimer has participated mainly in the middle divisions of the Swedish football league system. Their best period was in the 1920s including the years 1925 to 1928 when they played in Division 2 Västsvenska which was then the second tier of Swedish football. In 1941 they played a Division 2 promotion qualification match with Skogen before 4,027 spectators but their all time attendance record was the 4,178 people who attended a friendly match against IFK Norrkoping in 1948.

The lowest point for the club was in 1952 when they finished bottom of Division 5 but they subsequently played many years in Division 3 followed by spells in Division 2 over the last two decades. The club currently plays in Division 3 Mellersta Götaland which is the fifth tier of Swedish football. They have played their home matches at the Framnäs IP in Lidköping since 1915. In 2012 Heimer merged with Lidköpings IF to form Lidköpings FK.

IF Heimer was affiliated to the Västergötlands Fotbollförbund.

== Season to season ==
Season	Level	Division	Section	Position	Movements
1993	Tier 4	Division 3	Mellersta Götaland	1st	Promoted
1994	Tier 3	Division 2	Västra Götaland	6th	
1995	Tier 3	Division 2	Västra Götaland	5th	
1996	Tier 3	Division 2	Västra Götaland	10th	Relegation Playoffs
1997	Tier 3	Division 2	Västra Götaland	9th	
1998	Tier 3	Division 2	Västra Götaland	9th	
1999	Tier 3	Division 2	Västra Götaland	5th	
2000	Tier 3	Division 2	Västra Götaland	8th	
2001	Tier 3	Division 2	Västra Götaland	10th	Relegation Playoffs
2002	Tier 3	Division 2	Västra Götaland	11th	Relegated
2003	Tier 4	Division 3	Mellersta Götaland	3rd	
2004	Tier 4	Division 3	Nordöstra Götaland	1st	Promoted
2005	Tier 3	Division 2	Västra Götaland	8th	
2006*	Tier 4	Division 2	Mellersta Götaland	7th	
2007	Tier 4	Division 2	Mellersta Götaland	12th	Relegated
2008	Tier 5	Division 3	Mellersta Götaland	9th	
2009	Tier 5	Division 3	Mellersta Götaland	3rd	
2010	Tier 5	Division 3	Mellersta Götaland	4th	

* League restructuring in 2006 resulted in a new division being created at Tier 3 and subsequent divisions dropping a level.

== Attendances ==
In recent seasons IF Heimer have had the following average attendances:

Season	Average attendance	Division / Section	Level
2005	485	Div 2 Västra Götaland	Tier 3
2006	301	Div 2 Mellersta Götaland	Tier 4
2007	469	Div 2 Mellersta Götaland	Tier 4
2008	300	Div 3 Mellersta Götaland	Tier 5
2009	281	Div 3 Mellersta Götaland	Tier 5
2010	285	Div 3 Mellersta Götaland	Tier 5

* Attendances are provided in the Publikliga sections of the Svenska Fotbollförbundet website.
