= Bjuråkers GIF =

Swedish sports club

- Full name: Bjuråkers gymnastik- och idrottsförening
- Sport: soccer skiing ice hockey (earlier)
- Founded: 26 November 1952
- Based in: Bjuråker, Sweden
- Arena: Vesslamon

Bjuråkers GIF is a sports club in Bjuråker, Sweden, established on 26 November 1952.

The women's soccer team played in the Swedish top division in 1978.
