= Enångers IK =

Swedish football club

- Full name: Enångers Idrottsklubb
- Ground: Brovallen; Enånger; Sweden
- Chairman: Johan Björkman
- League: Division 5 Hälsingland
Home colours	Away colours

Enångers IK is a Swedish football club located in Enånger. 5 Enångers IK currently plays in Division 5 Hälsingland which is the sixth tier of Swedish football. They play their home matches at the Brovallen in Enånger.

The club is affiliated to Hälsinglands Fotbollförbund.

== Season to season ==
In the late 1960s Enångers IK competed in the following divisions:

Season	Level	Division	Section	Position	Movements
1966	Tier 4	Division 4	Hälsingland	5th	
1967	Tier 4	Division 4	Hälsingland	8th	
1968	Tier 4	Division 4	Hälsingland	10th	
1969	Tier 4	Division 4	Hälsingland	11th	Relegated

* League restructuring in 2006 resulted in a new division being created at Tier 3 and subsequent divisions dropping a level.

In recent seasons Enångers IK have competed in the following divisions:

Season	Level	Division	Section	Position	Movements
1993	Tier 5	Division 4	Hälsingland	2nd	
1994	Tier 5	Division 4	Hälsingland	3rd	
1995	Tier 5	Division 4	Hälsingland	5th	
1996	Tier 5	Division 4	Hälsingland	9th	
1997	Tier 5	Division 4	Hälsingland	2nd	
1998	Tier 5	Division 4	Hälsingland	1st	Promoted
1999	Tier 4	Division 3	Södra Norrland	9th	Relegated
2000	Tier 5	Division 4	Hälsingland	9th	
2001	Tier 5	Division 4	Hälsingland	9th	
2002	Tier 5	Division 4	Hälsingland	10th	
2003	Tier 5	Division 4	Hälsingland	9th	
2004	Tier 5	Division 4	Hälsingland	5th	
2005	Tier 5	Division 4	Hälsingland	7th	
2006*	Tier 6	Division 4	Hälsingland	10th	Relegated
2007	Tier 7	Division 5	Hälsingland	11th	Relegated
2008	Tier 8	Division 6	Hälsingland Södra	2nd	
2009	Tier 8	Division 6	Hälsingland Norra	2nd	Promoted
2010	Tier 7	Division 5	Hälsingland	4th	Promoted
2011	Tier 6	Division 4	Hälsingland		

* League restructuring in 2006 resulted in a new division being created at Tier 3 and subsequent divisions dropping a level.
