= Tillberga IK =

Swedish sports club

- Full name: Tillberga idrottsklubb
- Sport: bandy, floorball, handball, soccer
- Founded: 8 February 1930
- Based in: Tillberga, Sweden
- Arena: ABB Arena

Tillberga IK is a sports club in Tillberga in Västerås Municipality, Sweden. Tillberga IK was founded on 8 February 1930 and had a number of sections within one club until 1998. At the annual meeting that year, it was decided to split the club up, so that each section would be its own club legally, but all as members of the "Tillberga IK Alliansen" as an umbrella organisation.

The men's bandy team has played in the Swedish top division during the 21st century.

== Sections ==
- Tillberga IK Bandy, bandy
- Tillberga IK Fotboll, association football
- Tillberga IK Handboll, handball
- Tillberga IK Innebandy, floorball
