= Delsbo IF =

Swedish football club

- Full name: Delsbo Idrottsförening
- Founded: 1912
- Ground: Delsbo IP; Delsbo; Sweden
- League: Division 4 Hälsingland
Home colours	Away colours

Delsbo IF is a Swedish football club located in Delsbo.

== Background ==
Delsbo IF currently plays in Division 4 Hälsingland which is the sixth tier of Swedish football. They play their home matches at the Delsbo IP in Delsbo.

The club is affiliated to Hälsinglands Fotbollförbund.

== Season to season ==
Season	Level	Division	Section	Position	Movements
1988	Tier 4	Division 3	Södra Norrland	1st	Promoted
1989	Tier 3	Division 2	Norra	14th	Relegated
1990	Tier 4	Division 3	Södra Norrland	3rd	
1991	Tier 4	Division 3	Södra Norrland	5th	
1992	Tier 4	Division 3	Mellersta Norrland B	1st	Vårserier (Spring Series) – Promoted
1992	Tier 3	Division 2	Hösttvåan Norrland	3rd	Höstserier (Autumn Series)
1993	Tier 3	Division 2	Norrland	11th	Relegated
1994	Tier 4	Division 3	Mellersta Norrland	1st	Promoted
1995	Tier 3	Division 2	Östra Svealand	12th	Relegated
1996	Tier 4	Division 3	Mellersta Norrland	1st	Promoted
1997	Tier 3	Division 2	Östra Svealand	12th	Relegated
1998	Tier 4	Division 3	Mellersta Norrland	11th	Relegated
1999	Tier 5	Division 4	Hälsingland	7th	
2000	Tier 5	Division 4	Hälsingland	4th	
2001	Tier 5	Division 4	Hälsingland	1st	Promoted
2002	Tier 4	Division 3	Södra Norrland	12th	Relegated
2003	Tier 5	Division 4	Hälsingland	12th	Relegated
2004	Tier 6	Division 5	Hälsingland	2nd	Promoted
2005	Tier 5	Division 4	Hälsingland	4th	
2006*	Tier 6	Division 4	Hälsingland	1st	Promoted
2007	Tier 5	Division 3	Mellersta Norrland	5th	
2008	Tier 5	Division 3	Södra Norrland	10th	Relegated
2009	Tier 6	Division 4	Hälsingland	3rd	
2010	Tier 6	Division 4	Hälsingland	3rd	
2011	Tier 6	Division 4	Hälsingland		

* League restructuring in 2006 resulted in a new division being created at Tier 3 and subsequent divisions dropping a level.
