= Örebro SK Ungdom =

Swedish football club

- Full name: Örebro Sportklubb Ungdom
- Founded: 1988
- Ground: Behrn Arena; Örebro; Sweden
- Capacity: 14,500
- Chairman: Per Wickberg
- Head coach: Håkan Juhlin
- Coach: Magnus Samuelsson
- League: Division 2 Norra Götaland
- 2010: Division 2 Södra Svealand, 7th
Home colours	Away colours

Örebro SK Ungdom is a Swedish sport club located in Örebro. It is the youth-section of multi-sportclub Örebro SK.

== Background ==
Örebro Sportklubb Ungdom was formed in 1988 and provides sporting activities for the junior age groups. Örebro SK Ungdom is a separate legal entity to Örebro SK but works in close cooperation with the senior club.

Since their foundation Örebro SK Ungdom has participated mainly in the lower divisions of the Swedish football league system. The club lastly played in 2013 in Division 4, which is the sixth tier of Swedish football. They played their home matches at the Behrn Arena in Örebro.

== Season to season (football) ==
Season	Level	Division	Section	Position	Movements
1997	Tier 5	Division 4	Örebro Län	4th	
1998	Tier 5	Division 4	Örebro Län	5th	
1999	Tier 5	Division 4	Örebro Län	3rd	
2000	Tier 5	Division 4	Örebro Län	1st	Promoted
2001	Tier 4	Division 3	Västra Svealand	3rd	
2002	Tier 4	Division 3	Västra Svealand	6th	
2003	Tier 4	Division 3	Västra Svealand	4th	
2004	Tier 4	Division 3	Västra Svealand	1st	Promoted
2005	Tier 3	Division 2	Norra Svealand	11th	Relegated
2006*	Tier 5	Division 3	Västra Svealand	6th	
2007	Tier 5	Division 3	Västra Svealand	2nd	Promotion Playoffs
2008	Tier 5	Division 3	Västra Svealand	4th	
2009	Tier 5	Division 3	Västra Svealand	1st	Promoted
2010	Tier 4	Division 2	Södra Svealand	7th	
2011	Tier 4	Division 2	Norra Götaland	12th	Relegated

* League restructuring in 2006 resulted in a new division being created at Tier 3 and subsequent divisions dropping a level.
