= Kinna IF =

Swedish football club

- Full name: Kinna Idrottsförening
- Founded: 1934
- Ground: Viskavallen; Kinna; Sweden
- Capacity: 7,000
- Chairman: Åke Fäldt
- Head coach: Warren Green
- Coach: Per Harrysson
- League: Division 3 Västra Götaland
- 2013: Division 3 Västra Götaland, 9th
Home colours

Kinna IF is a Swedish football club located in Kinna in Mark Municipality, Västra Götaland County.

== Background ==
Since their foundation in 1934 Kinna IF has participated mainly in the middle and lower divisions of the Swedish football league system. The club currently plays in Division 3 Västra Götaland which is the fourth tier of Swedish football. They play their home matches at the Viskavallen in Kinna.

The club is affiliated to the Västergötlands Fotbollförbund.

== Season to season ==
Season	Level	Division	Section	Position	Movements
1993	Tier 5	Division 4	Västergötland Södra	4th	
1994	Tier 5	Division 4	Västergötland Södra	1st	Promoted
1995	Tier 4	Division 3	Sydvästra Götaland	3rd	
1996	Tier 4	Division 3	Sydvästra Götaland	4th	
1997	Tier 4	Division 3	Sydvästra Götaland	3rd	
1998	Tier 4	Division 3	Sydvästra Götaland	6th	
1999	Tier 4	Division 3	Sydvästra Götaland	8th	
2000	Tier 4	Division 3	Sydvästra Götaland	10th	Relegated
2001	Tier 5	Division 4	Västergötland Södra	1st	Promoted
2002	Tier 4	Division 3	Sydvästra Götaland	6th	
2003	Tier 4	Division 3	Sydvästra Götaland	1st	Promoted
2004	Tier 3	Division 2	Västra Götaland	9th	
2005	Tier 3	Division 2	Mellersta Götaland	7th	
2006*	Tier 4	Division 2	Västra Götaland	4th	
2007	Tier 4	Division 2	Västra Götaland	4th	
2008	Tier 4	Division 2	Västra Götaland	7th	
2009	Tier 4	Division 2	Mellersta Götaland	8th	
2010	Tier 4	Division 2	Västra Götaland	9th	
2011	Tier 4	Division 2	Västra Götaland	11th	Relegated

* League restructuring in 2006 resulted in a new division being created at Tier 3 and subsequent divisions dropping a level.

== Attendances ==
In recent seasons Kinna IF have had the following average attendances:

Season	Average attendance	Division / Section	Level
2005	456	Div 2 Mellersta Götaland	Tier 3
2006	349	Div 2 Västra Götaland	Tier 4
2007	367	Div 2 Västra Götaland	Tier 4
2008	209	Div 2 Västra Götaland	Tier 4
2009	277	Div 2 Mellersta Götaland	Tier 4
2010	209	Div 2 Västra Götaland	Tier 4

* Attendances are provided in the Publikliga sections of the Svenska Fotbollförbundet website.
