= IFK Lane =

Swedish football club

- Full name: Idrottsföreningen Kamraterna Lane
- Founded: 1935
- Ground: Lanevallen; Lane-Ryr; Uddevalla; Sweden
- Chairman: Magnus Carlsson
- League: Division 4 Bohuslän/Dalsland
Home colours	Away colours

IFK Lane is a Swedish football club located in Lane-Ryr, Uddevalla.

== Background ==
IFK Lane currently plays in Division 4 Bohuslän/Dalsland which is the sixth tier of Swedish football. They play their home matches at the Lanevallen in Lane-Ryr, Uddevalla.

The club is affiliated to Bohusläns Fotbollförbund. IFK Lane have competed in the Svenska Cupen on 3 occasions and have played 5 matches in the competition.

== Season to season ==
Season	Level	Division	Section	Position	Movements
2006*	Tier 6	Division 4	Bohuslän/Dalsland	9th	
2007	Tier 6	Division 4	Bohuslän/Dalsland	11th	Relegated
2008	Tier 7	Division 5	Bohuslän	5th	
2009	Tier 7	Division 5	Bohuslän	4th	
2010	Tier 7	Division 5	Bohuslän	2nd	Promoted
2011	Tier 6	Division 4	Bohuslän/Dalsland	8th	

* League restructuring in 2006 resulted in a new division being created at Tier 3 and subsequent divisions dropping a level.
