= 1999 Division 2 (Swedish football) =

Swedish football league season

Statistics of Swedish football Division 2 for the 1999 season.

== League standings ==
=== Division 2 Norrland ===
Pos	Team	Pld	W	D	L	GF	GA	GD	Pts	Qualification or relegation
1	Östersunds FK	22	14	3	5	54	9	+45	45	Promotion Playoffs
2	Selånger FK	22	12	5	5	47	21	+26	41	
3	Kiruna	22	13	1	8	52	30	+22	40	
4	Piteå IF	22	10	7	5	50	31	+19	37	
5	Skellefteå AIK	22	11	3	8	27	30	−3	36	
6	Friska Viljor	22	10	3	9	40	28	+12	33	
7	IFK Holmsund	22	8	6	8	41	39	+2	30	
8	Boden	22	8	5	9	35	42	−7	29	
9	Stockvik (R)	22	7	4	11	33	35	−2	25	Relegation to Division 3
10	Assi (R)	22	5	9	8	27	31	−4	24	Relegation to Division 3
11	Morön (R)	22	6	4	12	22	46	−24	22	Relegation to Division 3
12	Gällivare (R)	22	1	4	17	13	86	−73	7	Relegation to Division 3

Rules for classification: 1) points; 2) goal difference; 3) number of goals scored.
(R) Relegated

=== Division 2 Östra Svealand ===
Pos	Team	Pld	W	D	L	GF	GA	GD	Pts	Qualification or relegation
1	Väsby IK	22	14	8	0	50	19	+31	50	Promotion Playoffs
2	Vasalunds IF	22	14	4	4	48	23	+25	46	
3	Visby IF Gute	22	11	7	4	38	23	+15	40	
4	Vallentuna	22	10	6	6	50	32	+18	36	
5	Tyresö FF	22	10	6	6	36	29	+7	36	
6	Sandvikens IF	22	9	4	9	28	37	−9	31	
7	Älta	22	8	6	8	35	41	−6	30	
8	Järfälla	22	7	2	13	32	42	−10	23	
9	Edsbyn (R)	22	4	7	11	33	38	−5	19	Relegation to Division 3
10	Söderhamn (R)	22	4	7	11	20	33	−13	19	Relegation to Division 3
11	Hudiksvall (R)	22	3	8	11	23	47	−24	17	Relegation to Division 3
12	IFK Gävle (R)	22	3	5	14	21	50	−29	14	Relegation to Division 3

Rules for classification: 1) points; 2) goal difference; 3) number of goals scored.
(R) Relegated

=== Division 2 Västra Svealand ===
Pos	Team	Pld	W	D	L	GF	GA	GD	Pts	Qualification or relegation
1	Café Opera United	22	15	6	1	54	10	+44	51	Promotion Playoffs
2	BK Forward	22	13	5	4	38	15	+23	44	
3	Rynninge	22	10	7	5	27	21	+6	37	
4	Värtan	22	10	3	9	27	35	−8	33	
5	Spånga	22	7	10	5	30	38	−8	31	
6	IFK Västerås	22	7	9	6	19	20	−1	30	
7	City	22	7	8	7	32	31	+1	29	
8	KB Karlskoga	22	8	5	9	26	29	−3	29	
9	Ludvika FK (R)	22	6	5	11	24	32	−8	23	Relegation to Division 3
10	IFK Eskilstuna (R)	22	6	2	14	18	38	−20	20	Relegation to Division 3
11	FBK Karlstad (R)	22	4	5	13	24	40	−16	17	Relegation to Division 3
12	Håbo (R)	22	3	7	12	26	36	−10	16	Relegation to Division 3

Rules for classification: 1) points; 2) goal difference; 3) number of goals scored.
(R) Relegated

=== Division 2 Östra Götaland ===
Pos	Team	Pld	W	D	L	GF	GA	GD	Pts	Qualification or relegation
1	Ljungby	22	10	7	5	51	38	+13	37	Promotion Playoffs
2	Linköping	22	11	4	7	31	25	+6	37	
3	Nybro IF	22	8	10	4	35	36	−1	34	
4	Grimsås	22	9	6	7	45	39	+6	33	
5	Hjulsbro	22	9	5	8	42	37	+5	32	
6	IK Sleipner	22	9	5	8	31	27	+4	32	
7	Myresjö IF	22	9	5	8	32	29	+3	32	
8	Tord	22	9	5	8	35	34	+1	32	
9	Kalmar AIK (R)	22	7	7	8	39	39	0	28	Relegation to Division 3
10	Växjö Norra IF (R)	22	7	7	8	36	42	−6	28	Relegation to Division 3
11	Gullringen (R)	22	7	3	12	32	39	−7	24	Relegation to Division 3
12	Olofström (R)	22	2	6	14	16	40	−24	12	Relegation to Division 3

Rules for classification: 1) points; 2) goal difference; 3) number of goals scored.
(R) Relegated

=== Division 2 Västra Götaland ===
Pos	Team	Pld	W	D	L	GF	GA	GD	Pts	Qualification or relegation
1	Norrby IF	22	12	7	3	46	20	+26	43	Promotion Playoffs
2	Torslanda IK	22	12	5	5	48	30	+18	41	
3	Trollhättans FK	22	10	5	7	38	31	+7	35	
4	Skene	22	9	4	9	33	34	−1	31	
5	IF Heimer	22	7	9	6	28	30	−2	30	
6	Lundby	22	7	8	7	30	28	+2	29	
7	Skövde AIK	22	6	10	6	21	23	−2	28	
8	Qviding FIF	22	7	6	9	40	49	−9	27	
9	Skärhamn (R)	22	7	6	9	30	40	−10	27	Relegation to Division 3
10	IK Oddevold (R)	22	6	8	8	42	45	−3	26	Relegation to Division 3
11	Holmalunds IF (R)	22	7	3	12	36	36	0	24	Relegation to Division 3
12	Ulvåkers IF (R)	22	3	7	12	26	50	−24	16	Relegation to Division 3

Rules for classification: 1) points; 2) goal difference; 3) number of goals scored.
(R) Relegated

=== Division 2 Södra Götaland ===
Pos	Team	Pld	W	D	L	GF	GA	GD	Pts	Qualification or relegation
1	Lunds BK	22	14	4	4	39	15	+24	46	Promotion Playoffs
2	Högaborg	22	13	4	5	38	22	+16	43	
3	IFK Trelleborg	22	11	5	6	47	36	+11	38	
4	IFK Hässleholm	22	10	5	7	33	31	+2	35	
5	IF Leikin	22	9	7	6	38	26	+12	34	
6	Åhus Horna	22	8	8	6	41	29	+12	32	
7	IFK Malmö	22	9	5	8	32	25	+7	32	
8	Ystad	22	8	7	7	42	36	+6	31	
9	Ifö/Bromölla (R)	22	6	5	11	28	43	−15	23	Relegation to Division 3
10	IS Halmia (R)	22	5	3	14	31	51	−20	18	Relegation to Division 3
11	Höllvikens GIF (R)	22	5	3	14	24	45	−21	18	Relegation to Division 3
12	Laholm (R)	22	4	4	14	21	55	−34	16	Relegation to Division 3

Rules for classification: 1) points; 2) goal difference; 3) number of goals scored.
(R) Relegated
