= Ulvåkers IF =

Swedish football club

- Full name: Ulvåkers Idrottsförening
- Founded: 1946
- Ground: Åbrovallen; Skövde; Sweden
- Chairman: Jan Olof Berggren
- Head coach: Joakim Carlén
- Coach: Jonathan Guggenheim
- League: Division 3 Mellersta Götaland
- 2009: Division 3 Mellersta Götaland, 7th
Home colours	Away colours

Ulvåkers IF is a Swedish football club located in Skövde in Skövde Municipality, Västra Götaland County.

== Background ==
Ulvåkers Idrottsförening is a sports club located in Skövde that was formed in 1946. Their main local rivals in the town are Skövde AIK and IFK Skövde. Ulvåker is located about 1.5 miles (2.4 km) north of Skövde and the club has around 500 members covering men's, ladies and junior football.

Since their foundation Ulvåkers IF has participated mainly in the middle and lower divisions of the Swedish football league system. The club in 2010 have competed in Division 3 Mellersta Götaland which is the fifth tier of Swedish football but have been relegated following the Relegation/Promotion Playoffs. Their place in Division 3 has been taken by IFK Skövde FK who won the playoff group. They play their home matches at the Åbrovallen in Skövde. A huge project for the club was the official opening of Ulvåker IF's new indoor hall on 25 November 2000. This complex is the first football hall in the Municipality of Skövde.

Ulvåkers IF are affiliated to the Västergötlands Fotbollförbund.

== Season to season ==
Season	Level	Division	Section	Position	Movements
1993	Tier 3	Division 2	Västra Götaland	3rd	
1994	Tier 3	Division 2	Västra Götaland	5th	
1995	Tier 3	Division 2	Västra Götaland	8th	
1996	Tier 3	Division 2	Västra Götaland	12th	Relegated
1997	Tier 4	Division 3	Mellersta Götaland	2nd	Promotion Playoffs
1998	Tier 4	Division 3	Mellersta Götaland	1st	Promoted
1999	Tier 3	Division 2	Västra Götaland	12th	Relegated
2000	Tier 4	Division 3	Mellersta Götaland	6th	
2001	Tier 4	Division 3	Mellersta Götaland	7th	
2002	Tier 4	Division 3	Mellersta Götaland	8th	
2003	Tier 4	Division 3	Mellersta Götaland	10th	Relegated
2004	Tier 5	Division 4	Västergötland Norra	3rd	
2005	Tier 5	Division 4	Västergötland Norra	7th	
2006*	Tier 6	Division 4	Västergötland Norra	6th	
2007	Tier 6	Division 4	Västergötland Norra	2nd	Promotion Playoffs – Promoted
2008	Tier 5	Division 3	Mellersta Götaland	6th	
2009	Tier 5	Division 3	Mellersta Götaland	7th	
2010	Tier 5	Division 3	Mellersta Götaland	9th	Relegation Playoffs – Relegated

* League restructuring in 2006 resulted in a new division being created at Tier 3 and subsequent divisions dropping a level.

== Attendances ==
In recent seasons Ulvåkers IF have had the following average attendances:

Season	Average attendance	Division / Section	Level
2007	Not available	Div 4 Västergötland Norra	Tier 6
2008	158	Div 3 Mellersta Götaland	Tier 5
2009	173	Div 3 Mellersta Götaland	Tier 5
2010	166	Div 3 Mellersta Götaland	Tier 5

* Attendances are provided in the Publikliga sections of the Svenska Fotbollförbundet website.
