= 1997 Division 2 (Swedish football) =

Swedish football league season

Statistics of Swedish football Division 2 for the 1997 season.

== League standings ==
=== Division 2 Norrland ===
Pos	Team	Pld	W	D	L	GF	GA	GD	Pts	Promotion or relegation
1	Piteå IF (P)	22	13	4	5	38	16	+22	43	Promotion to Division 1
2	Skellefteå AIK	22	11	6	5	38	23	+15	39	Promotion Playoffs
3	Obbola/Holmsund	22	10	7	5	34	26	+8	37	
4	Morön	22	9	6	7	36	27	+9	33	
5	Hudiksvall	22	9	5	8	38	42	−4	32	
6	Kiruna	22	8	5	9	32	34	−2	29	
7	Östersunds FK	22	7	7	8	29	20	+9	28	
8	Gimonäs	22	7	7	8	20	23	−3	28	
9	Gällivare	22	8	4	10	28	42	−14	28	
10	Boden	22	7	5	10	25	36	−11	26	Division 3 Relegation Playoffs
11	IFK Sundsvall (R)	22	6	4	12	26	41	−15	22	Relegation to Division 3
12	Umedalen (R)	22	3	8	11	21	35	−14	17	Relegation to Division 3

Rules for classification: 1) points; 2) goal difference; 3) number of goals scored.
(P) Promoted; (R) Relegated

=== Division 2 Östra Svealand ===
Pos	Team	Pld	W	D	L	GF	GA	GD	Pts	Promotion or relegation
1	IK Sirius (P)	22	14	8	0	39	13	+26	50	Promotion to Division 1
2	Sandvikens IF	22	14	6	2	55	30	+25	48	Promotion Playoffs
3	Visby IF Gute	22	11	9	2	50	24	+26	42	
4	Café Opera United	22	10	6	6	38	24	+14	36	
5	IFK Gävle	22	10	5	7	35	24	+11	35	
6	Älvsjö	22	10	3	9	45	41	+4	33	
7	Vallentuna	22	8	8	6	36	35	+1	32	
8	Plavi Team/Stockholm	22	7	4	11	34	36	−2	25	
9	Enebyberg	22	6	6	10	26	32	−6	24	
10	IFK Österåker	22	5	7	10	30	35	−5	22	Division 3 Relegation Playoffs
11	Gimo (R)	22	3	3	16	27	61	−34	12	Relegation to Division 3
12	Delsbo (R)	22	1	1	20	18	78	−60	4	Relegation to Division 3

Rules for classification: 1) points; 2) goal difference; 3) number of goals scored.
(P) Promoted; (R) Relegated

=== Division 2 Västra Svealand ===
Pos	Team	Pld	W	D	L	GF	GA	GD	Pts	Promotion or relegation
1	Ludvika FK (P)	22	14	4	4	44	25	+19	46	Promotion to Division 1
2	IF Sylvia	22	11	6	5	53	33	+20	39	Promotion Playoffs
3	IFK Eskilstuna	22	11	5	6	50	37	+13	38	
4	Tyresö FF	22	11	4	7	42	25	+17	37	
5	Karlstad BK	22	9	6	7	39	38	+1	33	
6	Väsby IK	22	9	5	8	42	27	+15	32	
7	City	22	7	6	9	43	47	−4	27	
8	IFK Västerås	22	7	6	9	39	59	−20	27	
9	BK Forward	22	6	8	8	30	33	−3	26	
10	Nyköpings BIS	22	6	8	8	25	34	−9	26	Division 3 Relegation Playoffs
11	Harg (R)	22	8	0	14	27	51	−24	24	Relegation to Division 3
12	IFK Kumla (R)	22	2	4	16	17	52	−35	10	Relegation to Division 3

Rules for classification: 1) points; 2) goal difference; 3) number of goals scored.
(P) Promoted; (R) Relegated

=== Division 2 Östra Götaland ===
Pos	Team	Pld	W	D	L	GF	GA	GD	Pts	Promotion or relegation
1	Kalmar FF (P)	22	17	5	0	56	11	+45	56	Promotion to Division 1
2	Nybro IF	22	12	5	5	42	23	+19	41	Promotion Playoffs
3	Husqvarna FF	22	10	6	6	28	24	+4	36	
4	Växjö Norra IF	22	8	10	4	32	22	+10	34	
5	Gullringen	22	10	2	10	32	36	−4	32	
6	Tord	22	6	8	8	25	21	+4	26	
7	Kalmar AIK	22	6	8	8	19	23	−4	26	
8	Hjulsbro	22	5	9	8	24	30	−6	24	
9	Grimsås	22	5	9	8	20	27	−7	24	
10	IFK Värnamo	22	6	6	10	24	33	−9	24	Division 3 Relegation Playoffs
11	Älmhult (R)	22	5	6	11	21	35	−14	21	Relegation to Division 3
12	IK Sleipner (R)	22	4	2	16	22	60	−38	14	Relegation to Division 3

Rules for classification: 1) points; 2) goal difference; 3) number of goals scored.
(P) Promoted; (R) Relegated

=== Division 2 Västra Götaland ===
Pos	Team	Pld	W	D	L	GF	GA	GD	Pts	Promotion or relegation
1	Lundby (P)	22	14	3	5	44	33	+11	45	Promotion to Division 1
2	Trollhättans FK	22	12	6	4	43	21	+22	42	Promotion Playoffs
3	GAIS	22	11	8	3	27	20	+7	41	
4	Skövde AIK	22	12	3	7	33	21	+12	39	
5	Qviding FIF	22	9	6	7	39	32	+7	33	
6	Åsa	22	10	3	9	32	31	+1	33	
7	Kongahälla	22	7	6	9	29	30	−1	27	
8	Jonsered	22	7	5	10	27	30	−3	26	
9	IF Heimer	22	6	7	9	30	26	+4	25	
10	Holmalunds IF	22	7	4	11	35	42	−7	25	Division 3 Relegation Playoffs
11	IFK Uddevalla (R)	22	5	2	15	26	55	−29	17	Relegation to Division 3
12	Tidaholms GIF (R)	22	4	3	15	14	39	−25	15	Relegation to Division 3

Rules for classification: 1) points; 2) goal difference; 3) number of goals scored.
(P) Promoted; (R) Relegated

=== Division 2 Södra Götaland ===
Pos	Team	Pld	W	D	L	GF	GA	GD	Pts	Promotion or relegation
1	Landskrona BoIS (P)	22	11	7	4	52	20	+32	40	Promotion to Division 1
2	IS Halmia	22	11	6	5	27	22	+5	39	Promotion Playoffs
3	Laholm	22	11	5	6	38	33	+5	38	
4	IFK Trelleborg	22	11	4	7	43	29	+14	37	
5	Kristianstads FF	22	10	6	6	38	25	+13	36	
6	Lunds BK	22	8	7	7	30	31	−1	31	
7	Högaborg	22	7	9	6	33	24	+9	30	
8	Vinbergs IF	22	7	8	7	34	43	−9	29	
9	Olympic	22	7	6	9	31	36	−5	27	
10	Veberöds AIF	22	5	8	9	30	39	−9	23	Division 3 Relegation Playoffs
11	IF Leikin (R)	22	5	2	15	28	59	−31	17	Relegation to Division 3
12	Saxemara (R)	20	3	4	13	26	59	−33	13	Relegation to Division 3

Rules for classification: 1) points; 2) goal difference; 3) number of goals scored.
(P) Promoted; (R) Relegated
