= Boxholms IF =

Swedish football club

- Full name: Boxholms Idrottsförening
- Founded: 06071905
- Ground: Svartåvallen; Boxholm; Sweden
- Chairman: Johan Andersson
- League: Division 3 Nordöstra Götaland
Home colours

Boxholms IF is a Swedish football club located in Boxholm.

== Background ==
Boxholms IF currently plays in Division 4 Östergötland Västra which is the sixth tier of Swedish football. They play their home matches at the Svartåvallen in Boxholm.

Boxholms IF are affiliated to Östergötlands Fotbollförbund.

== Season to season ==
In their most successful period Boxholms IF competed in the following divisions:

Season	Level	Division	Section	Position	Movements
1928–29	Tier 3	Division 3	Södra Mellansvenska	5th	
1929–30	Tier 3	Division 3	Södra Mellansvenska	4th	
1930–31	Tier 3	Division 3	Södra Mellansvenska	4th	
1931–32	Tier 3	Division 3	Södra Mellansvenska	4th	
1932–33	Tier 3	Division 3	Södra Mellansvenska	6th	
1933–34	Tier 3	Division 3	Södra Mellansvenska	5th	
1934–35	Tier 3	Division 3	Södra Mellansvenska	9th	Relegated
1935–36	Tier 4	Division 4			Promoted
1936–37	Tier 3	Division 3	Södra Mellansvenska	2nd	
1937–38	Tier 3	Division 3	Södra Mellansvenska	6th	
1938–39	Tier 3	Division 3	Mellansvenska	9th	Relegated
1939–40	Tier 4	Division 4			Promoted
1940–41	Tier 3	Division 3	Mellansvenska Norra	6th	
1941–42	Tier 3	Division 3	Mellansvenska Norra	8th	
1942–43	Tier 3	Division 3	Mellansvenska Norra	10th	Relegated

In recent seasons Boxholms IF have competed in the following divisions:

Season	Level	Division	Section	Position	Movements
2006*	Tier 7	Division 5	Östergötland Västra	2nd	Promoted
2007	Tier 6	Division 4	Östergötland Västra	10th	
2008	Tier 6	Division 4	Östergötland Västra	5th	
2009	Tier 6	Division 4	Östergötland Västra	3rd	
2010	Tier 6	Division 4	Östergötland Västra	8th	
2011	Tier 6	Division 4	Östergötland Västra	4th	
2012	Tier 6	Division 4	Östergötland Västra	2nd	Promoted
