= Mariedals IK =

Swedish football club

- Full name: Mariedals Idrottsklubb
- Founded: 1938
- Ground: Borås Arena or Kransmossens IP; Borås; Sweden
- Chairman: Anders Nilsson; Per-Arne Sandin (Football Section)
- League: Division 3 Mellersta Götaland
- 2009: Division 3 Mellersta Götaland, 6th
Home colours

Mariedals IK is a Swedish football club located in Borås in Borås Municipality, Västra Götaland County.

== Background ==
Mariedals IK began operating in Borås on 30 March 1931 under the name IK Söderhov. The name Mariedal appeared for the first time a year later, when a couple of school boys, Kurt Johansson and Rickard Ödéhn, started the boys' football section. At the same time IK Viking was active and later changed their name to Borås AIK. On 13 April 1938 the two clubs merged to form Mariedals IK. The club now specialises in football and table-tennis but its activities in the past have also included bandy and floorball.

Since their foundation Mariedals IK has participated mainly in the middle and lower divisions of the Swedish football league system. The club currently plays in Division 3 Mellersta Götaland which is the fifth tier of Swedish football but have finished in a relegation position. They play their home matches at the Borås Arena or Kransmossens IP in Borås.

Mariedals IK are affiliated to the Västergötlands Fotbollförbund.

== Season to season ==
Season	Level	Division	Section	Position	Movements
1993	Tier 4	Division 3	Sydvästra Götaland	11th	Relegated
1994	Tier 5	Division 4	Västergötland Södra	3rd	
1995	Tier 5	Division 4	Västergötland Södra	5th	
1996	Tier 5	Division 4	Västergötland Södra	2nd	Promotion Playoffs – Promoted
1997	Tier 4	Division 3	Sydvästra Götaland	11th	Relegated
1998	Tier 5	Division 4	Västergötland Södra	2nd	Promotion Playoffs
1999	Tier 5	Division 4	Västergötland Södra	1st	Promoted
2000	Tier 4	Division 3	Mellersta Götaland	3rd	
2001	Tier 4	Division 3	Mellersta Götaland	6th	
2002	Tier 4	Division 3	Mellersta Götaland	4th	
2003	Tier 4	Division 3	Mellersta Götaland	4th	
2004	Tier 4	Division 3	Mellersta Götaland	12th	Relegated
2005	Tier 5	Division 4	Västergötland Södra	1st	Promoted
2006*	Tier 5	Division 3	Mellersta Götaland	7th	
2007	Tier 5	Division 3	Mellersta Götaland	5th	
2008	Tier 5	Division 3	Mellersta Götaland	7th	
2009	Tier 5	Division 3	Mellersta Götaland	6th	
2010	Tier 5	Division 3	Mellersta Götaland	12th	Relegated
2011	Tier 6	Division 4	Västergötland Södra		

* League restructuring in 2006 resulted in a new division being created at Tier 3 and subsequent divisions dropping a level.

== Attendances ==
In recent seasons Mariedals IK have had the following average attendances:

Season	Average attendance	Division / Section	Level
2005	Not available	Div 4 Västergötland Södra	Tier 5
2006	137	Div 3 Mellersta Götaland	Tier 5
2007	126	Div 3 Mellersta Götaland	Tier 5
2008	134	Div 3 Mellersta Götaland	Tier 5
2009	121	Div 3 Mellersta Götaland	Tier 5
2010	130	Div 3 Mellersta Götaland	Tier 5

* Attendances are provided in the Publikliga sections of the Svenska Fotbollförbundet website.
