= Malmslätts AIK =

Swedish football club

- Full name: Malmslätts Allmänna Idrottsklubb
- Ground: Hellgrenshagen, Malmslätt
- Chairman: Tommy Brage
- League: Division 4 Östergötland Västra
Home colours

Malmslätts AIK is a Swedish football club located in Malmslätt, Linköping Municipality.

== Background ==
Malmslätts AIK currently plays in Division 4 Östergötland Västra which is the sixth tier of Swedish football. They play their home matches at the Hellgrenshagen in Linköping.

Malmslätts AIK are affiliated to Östergötlands Fotbollförbund. Malmslätts AIK played in the 2006 Svenska Cupen but lost 6–0 away to Jönköpings Södra IF in the first round.

== Season to season ==
Season	Level	Division	Section	Position	Movements
1993	Tier 4	Division 3	Nordöstra Götaland	10th	Relegated
1994	Tier 5	Division 4	Östergötland Västra	2nd	Promotion Playoffs
1995	Tier 5	Division 4	Östergötland Västra	3rd	
1996	Tier 5	Division 4	Östergötland Västra	5th	
1997	Tier 5	Division 4	Östergötland Västra	5th	
1998	Tier 5	Division 4	Östergötland Västra	1st	Promoted
1999	Tier 4	Division 3	Nordöstra Götaland	1st	Promoted
2000	Tier 3	Division 2	Östra Götaland	12th	Relegated
2001	Tier 4	Division 3	Nordöstra Götaland	7th	
2002	Tier 4	Division 3	Nordöstra Götaland	9th	Relegation Playoffs
2003	Tier 4	Division 3	Nordöstra Götaland	11th	Relegated
2004	Tier 5	Division 4	Östergötland Västra	3rd	
2005	Tier 5	Division 4	Östergötland Västra	5th	
2006*	Tier 6	Division 4	Östergötland Västra	2nd	Promotion Playoffs
2007	Tier 6	Division 4	Östergötland Västra	7th	
2008	Tier 6	Division 4	Östergötland Västra	4th	
2009	Tier 6	Division 4	Östergötland Västra	4th	
2010	Tier 6	Division 4	Östergötland Västra	2nd	Promotion Playoffs
2011	Tier 6	Division 4	Östergötland Västra		

* League restructuring in 2006 resulted in a new division being created at Tier 3 and subsequent divisions dropping a level.
