= Umedalens IF =

Swedish football club

- Full name: Umedalens Idrottsförening
- Founded: 12 January 1935
- Ground: Umedalens IP; Umeå; Sweden
- Capacity: 3,500
- Manager: Harvey Upton
- Coach: Torbjörn Nordström
- League: Division 2 Norrland
- 2010: Division 2 Norrland, 7th
Home colours	Away colours

Umedalens IF a sports club in Umeå, Sweden formed on 12 January 1935 by the merger of Grubbs NS and Backens SK. Gunnar Lindahl was elected president. On 21 January 1935, the decision was taken to be a member of the Swedish Sports Confederation, the Swedish Ski Association, the Swedish Gymnastics Federation and the Swedish Football Association.

The football team of Umedalens IF currently plays in Division 2 Norrland. The club is affiliated to the Västerbottens Fotbollförbund.

== Season to season ==
Season	Level	Division	Section	Position	Movements
1993	Tier 5	Division 4	Västerbotten Södra	3rd	
1994	Tier 5	Division 4	Västerbotten Södra	1st	Promoted
1995	Tier 4	Division 3	Norra Norrland	7th	
1996	Tier 4	Division 3	Norra Norrland	1st	Promoted
1997	Tier 3	Division 2	Norrland	12th	Relegated
1998	Tier 4	Division 3	Mellersta Norrland	3rd	
1999	Tier 4	Division 3	Mellersta Norrland	2nd	
2000	Tier 4	Division 3	Mellersta Norrland	1st	Promoted
2001	Tier 3	Division 2	Norrland	12th	Relegated
2002	Tier 4	Division 3	Mellersta Norrland	9th	
2003	Tier 4	Division 3	Mellersta Norrland	10th	Relegated
2004	Tier 5	Division 4	Västerbotten Södra	1st	Promoted
2005	Tier 4	Division 3	Mellersta Norrland	3rd	Promoted
2006*	Tier 4	Division 2	Norrland	6th	
2007	Tier 4	Division 2	Norrland	8th	
2008	Tier 4	Division 2	Norrland	7th	
2009	Tier 4	Division 2	Norrland	4th	
2010	Tier 4	Division 2	Norrland	7th	
2011	Tier 4	Division 2	Norrland	6th	

* League restructuring in 2006 resulted in a new division being created at Tier 3 and subsequent divisions dropping a level.

== Attendances ==
In recent seasons Umedalens IF have had the following average attendances:

Season	Average attendance	Division / Section	Level
2007	160	Div 3 Mellersta Norrland	Tier 4
2008	133	Div 2 Norrland	Tier 4
2009	144	Div 2 Norrland	Tier 4
2010	139	Div 2 Norrland	Tier 4
2011	229	Div 2 Norrland	Tier 4
2012	188	Div 2 Norrland	Tier 4

* Attendances are provided in the Publikliga sections of the Svenska Fotbollförbundet website.

== Players 2013 ==
Note: Flags indicate national team as defined under FIFA eligibility rules; some limited exceptions apply. Players may hold more than one non-FIFA nationality.

No.	Pos.	Nation	Player
1	GK	SWE	Jim Grenholm
31	GK	SWE	Mattias Bergström
2	DF	SWE	David Viksten
3	DF	SWE	Lars Wikberg
4	DF	SWE	Rikard Lundberg
5	DF	SWE	Andreas Olofsson
6	DF	SWE	Nils Bylund
8	DF	SWE	Oskar Edholm
16	DF	SWE	Jesper Berglund
19	DF	SWE	Simon Westin
22	DF	SWE	Magnus Johansson
7	MF	SWE	Martin Andersson
10	MF	SWE	Henrik Folkesson
12	MF	SWE	Johan Järnberg

No.	Pos.	Nation	Player
15	MF	SWE	Kristoffer Stenman
17	MF	SWE	Emil Lindgren
18	MF	SWE	Anders Norberg
23	MF	SWE	Markus Folkesson
24	MF	SWE	Joakim Eriksson
25	MF	SWE	Ludvig Jakobsson
26	MF	SWE	Kristoffer Bjuhr
27	MF	SWE	Johan Nylund
9	FW	SWE	David Häggling
11	FW	SWE	Gustaf Persson
13	FW	SWE	Jesper Lott
14	FW	SWE	Adam Nylander
20	FW	SWE	Andreas Forsgren
21	FW	SOM	Mohammed Abdulkadir
