= Hjulsbro IK =

Swedish football club

- Full name: Hjulsbro Idrottsklubb
- Short name: hik
- Founded: 1930
- Ground: Pema Arena; Linköping; Sweden
- Chairman: Catharina Krantz
- League: Division 4 Östergötland Västra
Home colours	Away colours

Hjulsbro IK is a Swedish football club located in Linköping.

== Background ==
Hjulsbro IK currently plays in Division 4 Östergötland Västra which is the sixth tier of Swedish football. They play their home matches at the UCS Arena in Linköping.

Hjulsbro IK are affiliated to Östergötlands Fotbollförbund.

== Season to season ==
Season	Level	Division	Section	Position	Movements
1993	Tier 5	Division 4	Östergötland Östra	1st	Promoted
1994	Tier 4	Division 3	Nordöstra Götaland	11th	Relegated
1995	Tier 5	Division 4	Östergötland Västra	2nd	Promotion Playoffs – Promoted
1996	Tier 4	Division 3	Nordöstra Götaland	1st	Promoted
1997	Tier 3	Division 2	Östra Götaland	8th	
1998	Tier 3	Division 2	Östra Götaland	10th	Relegation Playoffs
1999	Tier 3	Division 2	Östra Götaland	5th	
2000	Tier 3	Division 2	Östra Götaland	11th	Relegated
2001	Tier 4	Division 3	Nordöstra Götaland	1st	Promoted
2002	Tier 3	Division 2	Östra Götaland	12th	Relegated
2003	Tier 4	Division 3	Nordöstra Götaland	4th	
2004	Tier 4	Division 3	Nordöstra Götaland	4th	
2005	Tier 4	Division 3	Nordöstra Götaland	12th	Relegated
2006*	Tier 6	Division 4	Östergötland Västra	12th	Relegated
2007	Tier 7	Division 5	Östergötland Mellersta	1st	Promoted
2008	Tier 6	Division 4	Östergötland Västra	6th	
2009	Tier 6	Division 4	Östergötland Västra	9th	
2010	Tier 6	Division 4	Östergötland Västra	5th	
2011	Tier 6	Division 4	Östergötland Västra		

* League restructuring in 2006 resulted in a new division being created at Tier 3 and subsequent divisions dropping a level.
