= Askeröds IF =

Swedish sports club

- Full name: Askeröds idrottsförening
- Sport: soccer
- Founded: 1944
- Based in: Askeröd, Sweden
- Arena: Askeröds IP

Askeröds IF is a sports club in Askeröd, Sweden, established in 1944.

The women's soccer team played in the Swedish top division in 1978.
