= Nässjö FF =

Swedish football club

- Full name: Nässjö Fotbollförening
- Founded: 1985
- Ground: Skogsvallen; Nässjö; Sweden
- Capacity: 2,000
- Chairman: (Sweden) Hanna Almström
- Manager: (Sweden) Ninos Töre
- League: Division 3 Nordöstra Götaland
Home colours

Nässjö FF is a Swedish football club located in Nässjö in Jönköping County.

== Background ==
Nässjö Fotbollförening was founded on 1 January 1985 and is today one of Nässjö Municipality's largest sports clubs with about 900 members. The club is particularly active in terms of youth development with approximately 600 active boys and girls. This means that Nässjö FF are one of Småland's largest youth clubs.

Since their foundation Nässjö FF has participated mainly in the middle divisions of the Swedish football league system. The club currently plays in Division 2 Nordöstra Götaland which is the fourth tier of Swedish football. They play their home matches at the Skogsvallen in Nässjö.

Nässjö FF are affiliated to Smålands Fotbollförbund.

== Recent history ==
In recent seasons Nässjö FF have competed in the following divisions:

2011 – Division III, Nordöstra Götaland
2010 – Division III, Nordöstra Götaland
2009 – Division II, Mellersta Götaland
2008 – Division III, Nordöstra Götaland
2007 – Division III, Nordöstra Götaland
2006 – Division III, Nordöstra Götaland
2005 – Division III, Nordöstra Götaland
2004 – Division IV, Småland Västra Elit
2003 – Division IV, Småland Östra Elit
2002 – Division III, Nordöstra Götaland
2001 – Division III, Sydöstra Götaland
2000 – Division III, Nordöstra Götaland
1999 – Division III, Nordöstra Götaland
1998 – Division III, Nordöstra Götaland
1997 – Division III, Nordöstra Götaland
1996 – Division III, Mellersta Götaland
1995 – Division II, Östra Götaland
1994 – Division III, Sydvästra Götaland
1993 – Division II, Östra Götaland

== Attendances ==
In recent seasons Nässjö FF have had the following average attendances:

Season	Average attendance	Division / Section	Level
2005	128	Div 3 Nordöstra Götaland	Tier 4
2006	140	Div 3 Nordöstra Götaland	Tier 5
2007	121	Div 3 Nordöstra Götaland	Tier 5
2008	270	Div 3 Nordöstra Götaland	Tier 5
2009	288	Div 2 Mellersta Götaland	Tier 4
2010	228	Div 3 Nordöstra Götaland	Tier 5

* Attendances are provided in the Publikliga sections of the Svenska Fotbollförbundet website.
