= Morön BK =

Swedish football club

- Full name: Morön Bollklubb
- Founded: 1935
- Ground: Skogsvallen IP; Skellefteå; Sweden
- Chairman: Mathias Gabrielsson
- Coach: Jörgen Grenholm; Simon Eriksson
- League: Division 2 Norrland
- 2019: Division 3 Norra Norrland 1st (Promoted)
Home colours

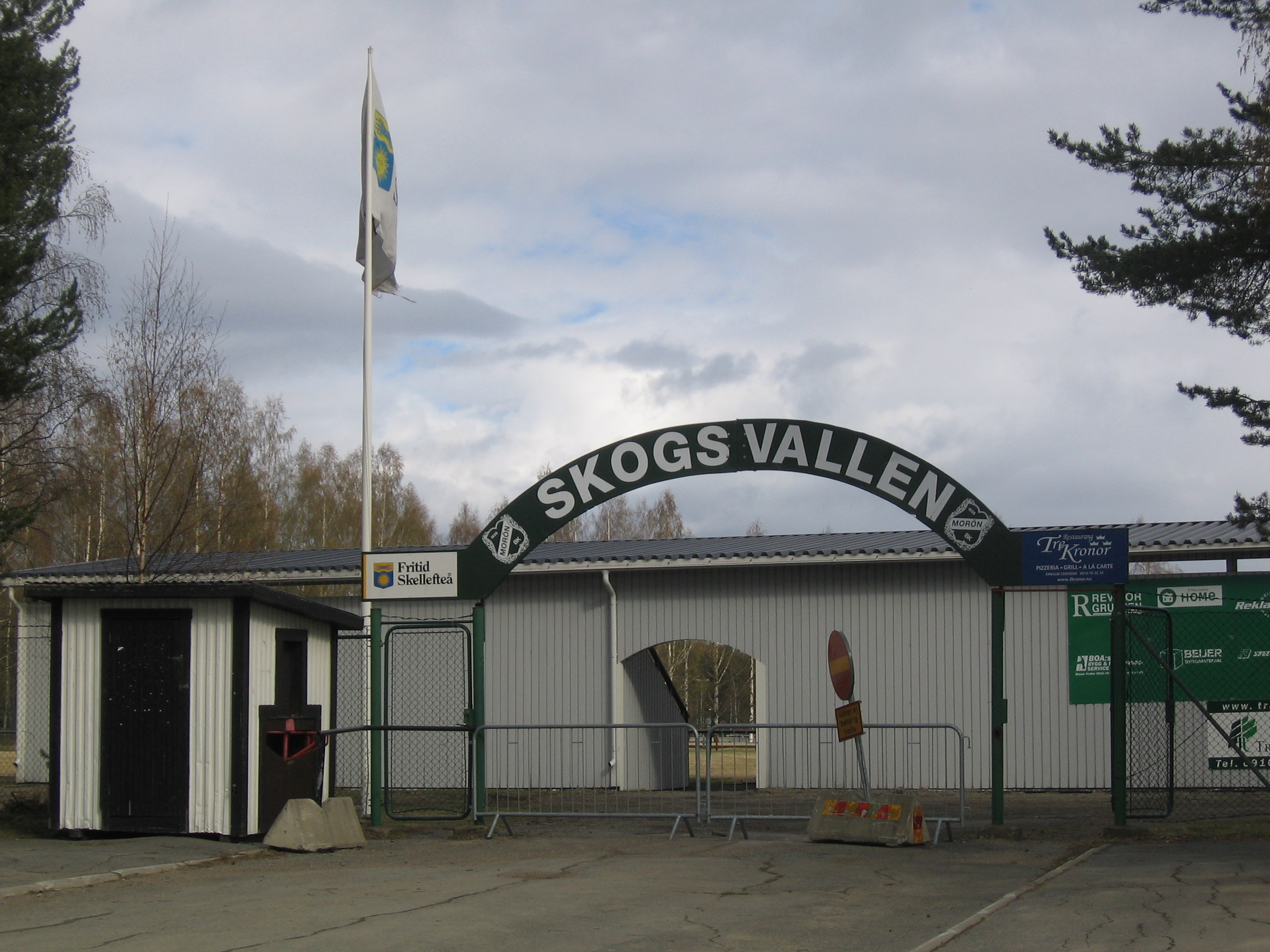
Skogsvallen

Morön BK is a Swedish football club located in Skellefteå in Västerbotten County.

== Background ==
Morön Bollklubb was formed at a meeting held in 1935, the driving force being Elof Burman who became the club chairman. After a lot of hard work by club members who prepared the Skogsvallen stadium, the club purchased the venue in 1942 for 4000 kr. Skogsvallen was completed in 1945 and the inaugural match was against Sunnanå SK with the home side winning 2–1.

Since their foundation Morön BK has participated mainly in the middle divisions of the Swedish football league system. The club currently (2015) plays in Division 3 Northern Norrland which is the fifth tier of Swedish football. The club play their home matches at the Skogsvallen IP in Skellefteå.

Morön BK are affiliated to the Västerbottens Fotbollförbund.

== Season to season ==
Season	Level	Division	Section	Position	Movements
1993	Tier 3	Division 2	Norrland	5th	
1994	Tier 3	Division 2	Norrland	8th	
1995	Tier 3	Division 2	Norrland	10th	Relegation Playoffs – Relegated
1996	Tier 4	Division 3	Norra Norrland	2nd	Promotion Playoffs – Promoted
1997	Tier 3	Division 2	Norrland	4th	
1998	Tier 3	Division 2	Norrland	10th	Relegation Playoffs
1999	Tier 3	Division 2	Norrland	11th	Relegated
2000	Tier 4	Division 3	Norra Norrland	6th	
2001	Tier 4	Division 3	Norra Norrland	4th	
2002	Tier 4	Division 3	Norra Norrland	2nd	Promotion Playoffs
2003	Tier 4	Division 3	Norra Norrland	9th	Relegation Playoffs
2004	Tier 4	Division 3	Norra Norrland	8th	
2005	Tier 4	Division 3	Norra Norrland	6th	
2006*	Tier 5	Division 3	Norra Norrland	9th	Relegation Playoffs
2007	Tier 5	Division 3	Norra Norrland	8th	
2008	Tier 5	Division 3	Norra Norrland	7th	
2009	Tier 5	Division 3	Norra Norrland	2nd	Promotion Playoffs
2010	Tier 5	Division 3	Norra Norrland	1st	Promoted
2011	Tier 4	Division 2	Norrland	9th	
2012	Tier 4	Division 2	Norrland	7th	
2013	Tier 4	Division 2	Norrland	10th	
2014	Tier 4	Division 2	Norrland	4th	Relegated
2015	Tier 5	Division 3	Norra Norrland	1st	Promoted
2016	Tier 4	Division 2	Norrland	6th	
2017	Tier 4	Division 2	Norrland	9th	
2018	Tier 6	Division 4	Norra Herrar		

* League restructuring in 2006 resulted in a new division being created at Tier 3 and subsequent divisions dropping a level.
