= Falköpings FK =

Swedish football club

- Full name: Falköpings Fotbollsklubb
- Nickname: FFK
- Founded: 1989
- Ground: Odenplan; Falköping; Sweden
- Chairman: Andreas Brorsson
- Head coach: Florent Rushiti & Mikael Billman
- League: Division 4 Västergötland Östra
Home colours	Away colours

Falköpings FK is a Swedish football club located in Falköping in Västra Götaland County.

== Background ==
Falköpings Fotbollsklubb was founded in 1989 when the local clubs BK Rapid, Falköpings AIK, and Falköpings BK chose to merge into a single club under the name F/F/R (FAIK/FBK/Rapid). It wasn't until a year later, in 1990, that the name Falköpings FK was adopted. Since its inception, the club has had a decent youth development program that has produced players such as Jonas Lindberg and Stefan Takac (who played in Allsvenskan for Västra Frölunda IF). The club has always operated teams for boys and men, but has also, at times, had girls' and women's teams. Currently (2025), the club does not have a dedicated girls' or women's section, but both girls and boys participate in the youngest youth teams.

The senior teams play at the municipal sports arena, Odenplan, which is shared with the women's football club Falköpings KIK and local rival IFK Falköping. The club's headquarters and office, FFK-huset, is just a stone's throw away from Odenplan. In recent years, the club has renovated the clubhouse and, among other improvements, built a gym for club use. FFK runs its youth activities at its own facility, Falevi, located in the industrial area of the same name in western Falköping, where there is a full-size eleven-a-side pitch and a seven-a-side pitch. In recent years, the club has renovated the facility, including upgrading the changing rooms.

Since its formation, the club's senior team has played in either Division 4 or Division 5. In 2010, the team won Division 4 and was promoted to Division 3 for the first time in its history. However, they only lasted one season, as they were relegated in the relegation playoffs after losing to local rival IFK Falköping in front of over 800 spectators. IFK Falköping went on to win the group and were promoted to Division 3. In the 2015 and 2016 seasons, the team finished in third place and qualified for the Division 3 playoffs but was unsuccessful in both attempts. In the 2018 season, the team finished in tenth place and had to play in the relegation playoffs to stay in Division 4. In the playoff group, which included Bergdalens IK and Trollhättans Syrianska FK, they won all their matches and retained their place in the league for the following season. In 2020, the team finished in eleventh place, which led to direct relegation to Division 5. In the 2023 season, the team made a comeback in Division 4 after winning Division 5 the previous year. During the season, they faced IFK Falköping for the first time since the 2011 playoffs. The home match attracted over 800 spectators, while the away match drew 600 spectators. The team's return to Division 4, however, did not go as hoped, as they ended up in a relegation playoff spot and were not able to stay up. The return to Division 4 was only delayed by one season, as they won Division 5 once again, and in the 2025 season, the team is back in Division 4.

Since 2021, the club has organized an annual ghost walk on Mösseberg every autumn, which has been a great success, attracting around 3,000 visitors each year.

== Recent history ==
In recent seasons Falköpings FK have competed in the following divisions:

2022 – Division IV, Västergötland Norra
2021 – Division V, Västergötland Mellersta
2020 – Division IV, Västergötland Norra
2019 – Division IV, Västergötland Norra
2018 – Division IV, Västergötland Norra
2017 – Division IV, Västergötland Norra
2016 – Division IV, Västergötland Norra
2015 – Division IV, Västergötland Norra
2014 – Division IV, Västergötland Norra
2013 – Division IV, Västergötland Norra
2012 – Division IV, Västergötland Norra
2011 – Division III, Mellersta Götaland
2010 – Division IV, Västergötland Norra
2009 – Division IV, Västergötland Norra
2008 – Division IV, Västergötland Norra
2007 – Division IV, Västergötland Norra
2006 – Division IV, Västergötland Norra
2005 – Division V, Västergötland Östra
2004 – Division IV, Västergötland Norra
2003 – Division IV, Västergötland Norra
2002 – Division IV, Västergötland Norra
2001 – Division V, Västergötland Östra
2000 – Division V, Södra Skaraborg
1999 – Division V, Södra Skaraborg

== Attendances ==
In recent seasons Falköpings FK have had the following average attendances:

Season	Average attendance	Division / Section	Level
2009	Not available	Div 4 Västergötland Norra	Tier 6
2010	138	Div 4 Västergötland Norra	Tier 6
2011	300	Div 3 Mellersta Götaland	Tier 5
2012	123	Div 4 Västergötland Norra	Tier 6
2013	143	Div 4 Västergötland Norra	Tier 6
2014	93	Div 4 Västergötland Norra	Tier 6
2015	145	Div 4 Västergötland Norra	Tier 6
2016	103	Div 4 Västergötland Norra	Tier 6
2017	100	Div 4 Västergötland Norra	Tier 6
2018	103	Div 4 Västergötland Norra	Tier 6

* Attendances are provided in the Publikliga sections of the Svenska Fotbollförbundet website.
