= IFK Falköping =

Swedish football club

IFK Falköping FF
- Full name: Idrottsföreningen Kamraterna Falköping Fotbollförening
- Founded: 1921
- Ground: Odenplan; Falköping; Sweden
- Chairman: Anders Harald Lundin
- Head coach: Peter Uvesten
- Coach: Tomas Westerberg
- League: Division 3 Mellersta Götaland
- 2017: Division 3 Mellersta Götaland 4th
Home colours	Away colours

IFK Falköping FF is a Swedish football club located in Falköping in Falköping Municipality, Västra Götaland County.

== Background ==
IFK Falköping is a sports club from Falköping that was founded in 1921 under the name Falköpings BK. The name was changed to IFK Falköping in 1925. The club runs sections covering table tennis, football and ice-hockey and previously provided for bandy. The club originally comprised a main board representing the various sections but at the AGM in 1988 was transformed into an alliance of clubs.

Since their foundation IFK Falköping FF has participated mainly in the middle and lower divisions of the Swedish football league system. In their early years the club played in the Skaraborgsserien and Västgötaserien. A notable Division 3 match was in 1957 when IFK Falköping lost to Tidaholms GIF in front of 2,291 spectators. In 1974 the club played at their highest level for one season in Division 2 Södra which at that time was the second tier of Swedish football. The club currently plays in Division 3 Mellersta Götaland which is the fifth tier of Swedish football but have finished in a relegation position. They play their home matches at the Odenplan in Falköping.

IFK Falköping FF are affiliated to the Västergötlands Fotbollförbund.

== Season to season ==
Season	Level	Division	Section	Position	Movements
1993	Tier 4	Division 3	Mellersta Götaland	3rd	
1994	Tier 4	Division 3	Mellersta Götaland	3rd	
1995	Tier 4	Division 3	Mellersta Götaland	3rd	
1996	Tier 4	Division 3	Mellersta Götaland	10th	Relegated
1997	Tier 5	Division 4	Västergötland Norra	1st	Promoted
1998	Tier 4	Division 3	Mellersta Götaland	4th	
1999	Tier 4	Division 3	Mellersta Götaland	8th	
2000	Tier 4	Division 3	Mellersta Götaland	7th	
2001	Tier 4	Division 3	Mellersta Götaland	11th	Relegated
2002	Tier 5	Division 4	Västergötland Norra	3rd	
2003	Tier 5	Division 4	Västergötland Norra	2nd	Promotion Playoffs – Promoted
2004	Tier 4	Division 3	Nordöstra Götaland	6th	
2005	Tier 4	Division 3	Mellersta Götaland	8th	
2006*	Tier 5	Division 3	Mellersta Götaland	4th	
2007	Tier 5	Division 3	Mellersta Götaland	4th	
2008	Tier 5	Division 3	Mellersta Götaland	10th	Relegated
2009	Tier 6	Division 4	Västergötland Norra	1st	Promoted
2010	Tier 5	Division 3	Mellersta Götaland	10th	Relegated

* League restructuring in 2006 resulted in a new division being created at Tier 3 and subsequent divisions dropping a level.

== Attendances ==
In recent seasons IFK Falköping FF have had the following average attendances:

Season	Average attendance	Division / Section	Level
2005	235	Div 3 Mellersta Götaland	Tier 4
2006	128	Div 3 Mellersta Götaland	Tier 5
2007	145	Div 3 Mellersta Götaland	Tier 5
2008	169	Div 3 Mellersta Götaland	Tier 5
2009	Not available	Div 4 Västergötland Norra	Tier 6
2010	155	Div 3 Mellersta Götaland	Tier 5

* Attendances are provided in the Publikliga sections of the Svenska Fotbollförbundet website.
