= Pelle Olsson =

Swedish football manager

Per Olsson
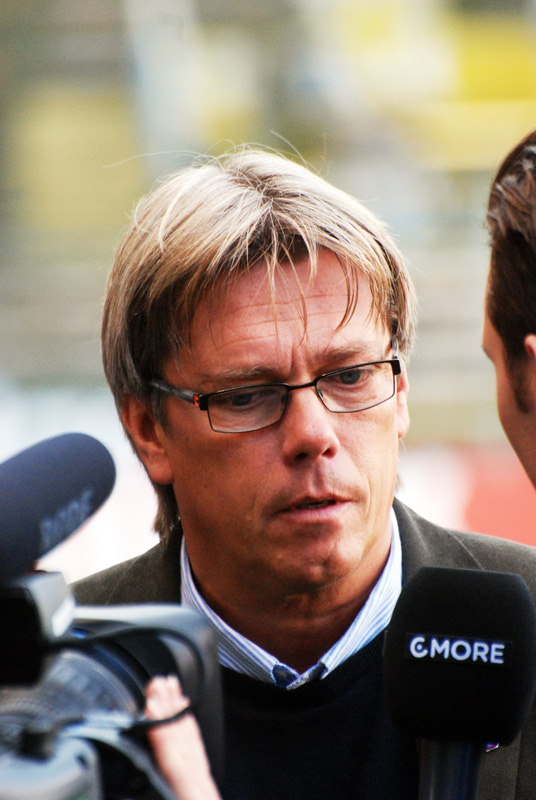

Personal information
- Date of birth: 1 August 1963 (age 63)
- Place of birth: Skutskär, Sweden
- Position: Forward

Team information
- Current team: Djurgårdens IF (scouting)

Youth career
- Skutskärs IF

Senior career*
Years	Team	Apps	(Gls)
1981–1984	Gefle IF		
1984–1985	Malmö FF	17	(7)
1986–1987	Halmstads BK	39	(10)
1988–1992	Gefle IF		

International career
1981	Sweden U19	5	(1)
1983–1986	Sweden U21	18	(3)

Managerial career
- 1993–1995: Gefle IF (assistant coach)
- 1996: Gefle IF (youth coach)
- 1996–2002: Gefle IF
- 2003–2004: Örebro SK (assistant coach)
- 2005–2013: Gefle IF
- 2014–2016: Djurgårdens IF
- 2017: AFC Eskilstuna
- 2017–2020: Sandvikens IF
- 2020–2024: Halmstads BK (head of scouting).
- 2024–: Djurgårdens IF Scouting
- * Club domestic league appearances and goals

Per "Pelle" Olsson (born 1 August 1963) is a Swedish football manager and a former player who works with scouting for Djurgårdens IF. He started out playing for his hometown club Skutskärs IF. During his injury-filled playing career he also represented Gefle IF, Malmö FF, Halmstads BK and the Sweden national under-21 football team. In his managerial career he is influenced by the managers who he previously played for like Roy Hodgson, Stuart Baxter and Benny Lennartsson. Before the start of the 2012 Allsvenskan season he was named the best manager in the league by newspaper Aftonbladet due to his ability to build a low-budget team that is greater than its individual parts.
