= Uppland Runic Inscription 1113 =

Coordinates: 60°01′26″N 17°32′22″E

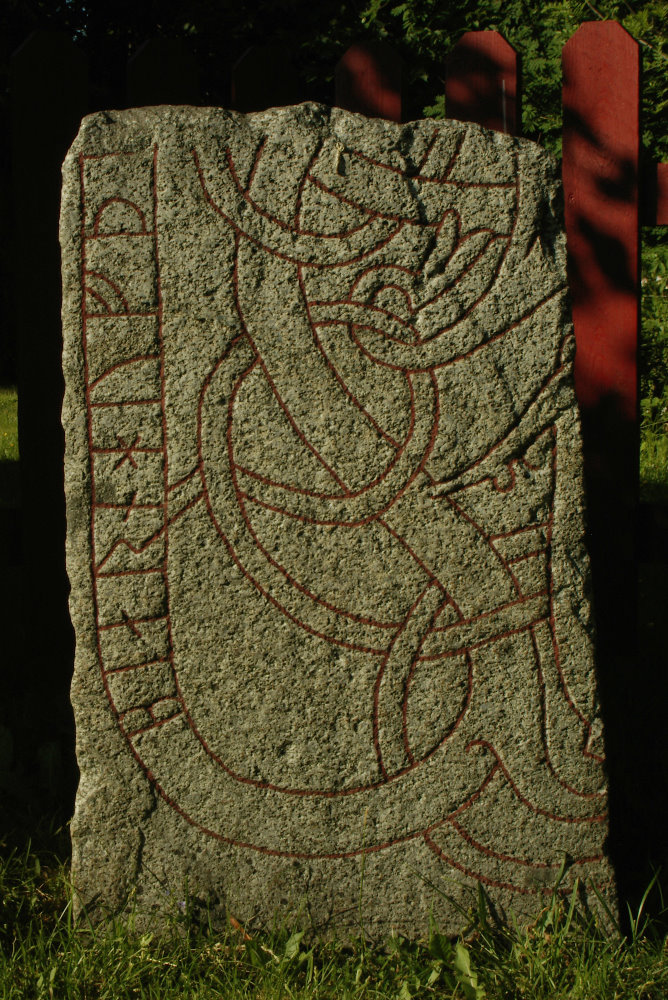
Runic inscription U 1113 is located at Häggeby, Uppland, Sweden.

Runic inscription U 1113 is the Rundata catalog number for a fragmentary Viking Age runestone that is located at Häggeby, which is about 1 kilometer west of Björklinge, Uppland, Sweden. The inscription is classified, based on the remaining evidence, as being carved in runestone style Pr4, also known as Urnes style. This runestone style is characterized by slim and stylized animals that are interwoven into tight patterns. The animal heads are typically seen in profile with slender almond-shaped eyes and upwardly curled appendages on the noses and the necks.

The fragmentary runic text on this stone, which is 1 meter in height, has only one word, biarnhufþi ..., which has been translated as the name Bjarnhǫfði. There is another Uppland inscription, U 1045, which is one of the Björklinge runestones, that is located about 1 kilometer to the east at the church in Björklinge which has the same name on its inscription. The inscription on U 1045 states, "Bjarnhǫfði had the stone cut in memory of Bjarnhǫfði, his father ..." It is not known if the name Bjarnhǫfði on inscription U 1113 is associated with the father or son on U 1045, or refers to a third person with this name.

== See also ==
- List of runestones
