= Bror Hjorth =

Swedish artist

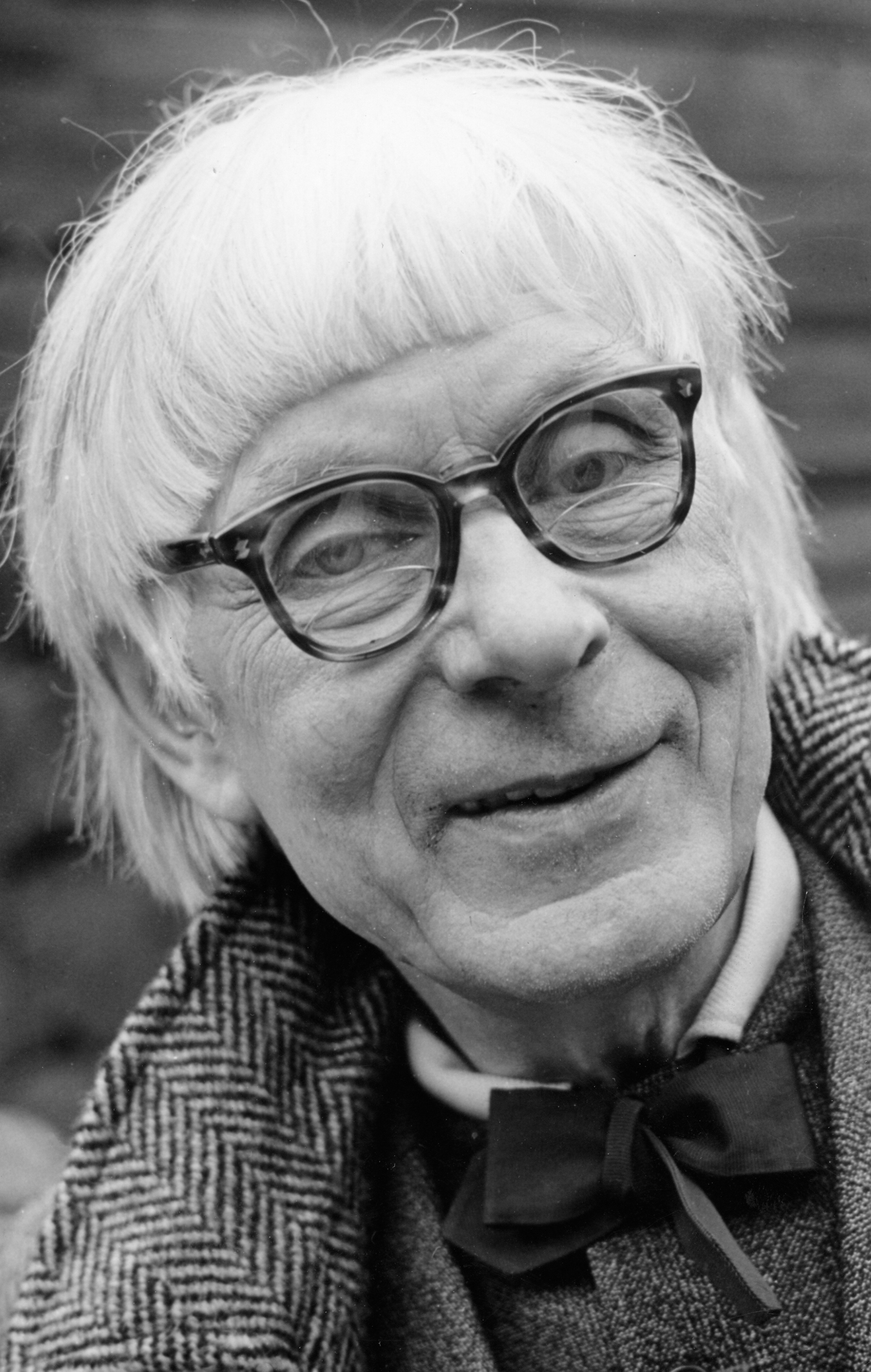
Bror Hjorth ca 1955.

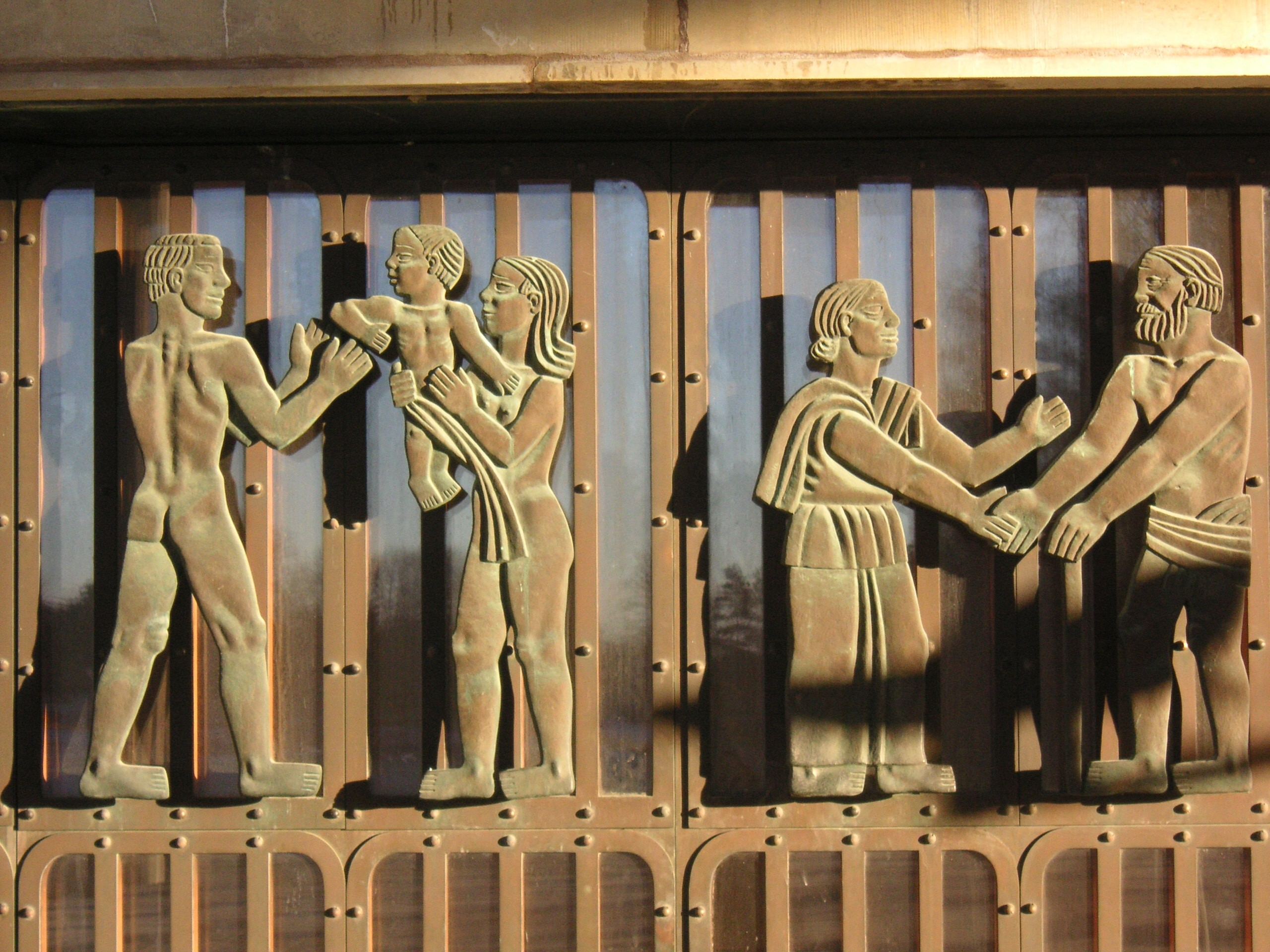
Hjorth's work at the Skogskyrkogården Cemetery, Stockholm

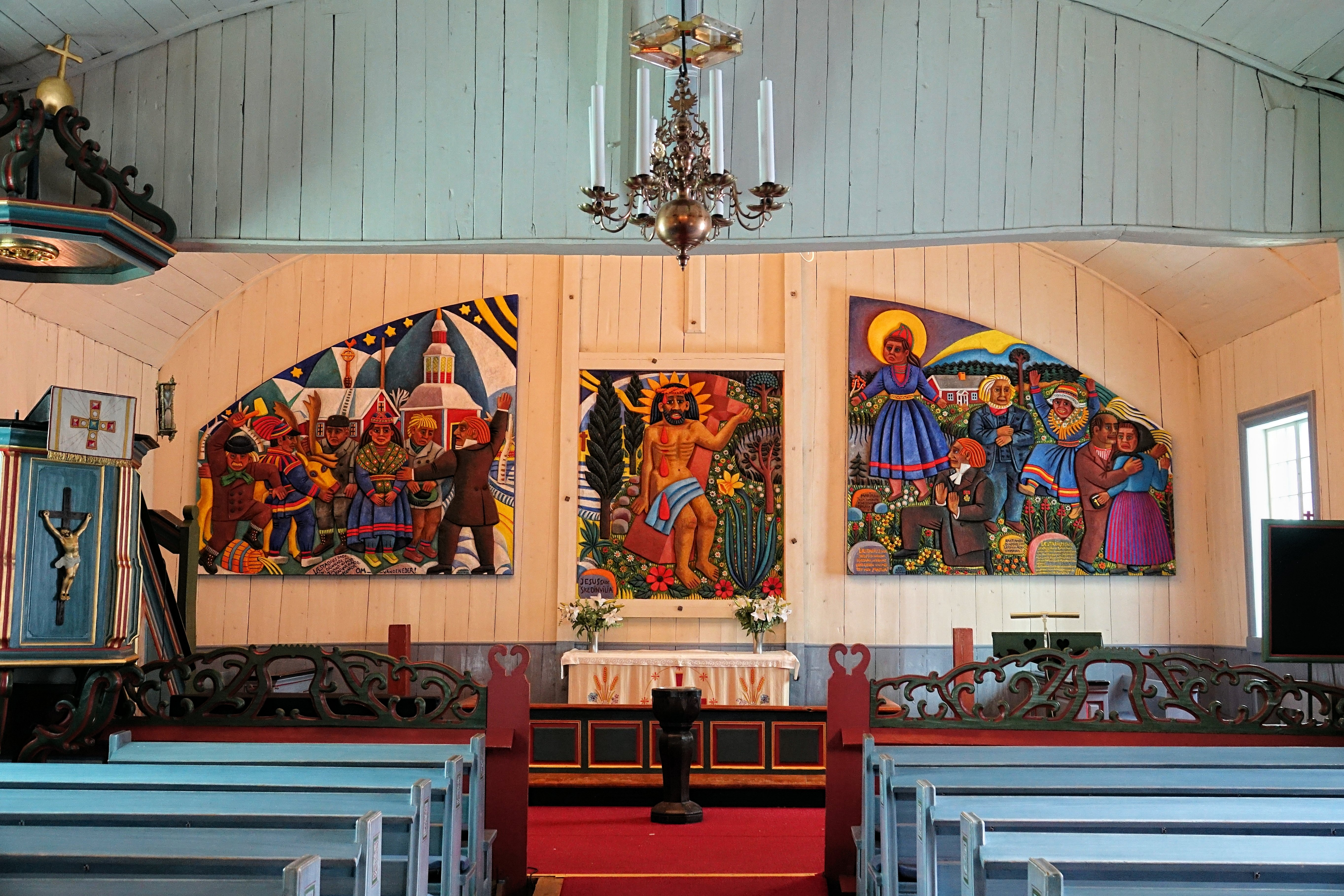
Altarpiece at Jukkasjärvi Church

Bror Hjorth (1894 in Marma, Sweden – May 21, 1968 in Uppsala, Sweden) was a Swedish artist. Hjorth was one of Sweden's best-known sculptors and painters, and was professor of art at the Royal University College of Fine Arts in Stockholm from 1949 to 1959. On completion of his studies, he lived in Uppsala, where he built his studio home in Kåbo, now the Bror Hjorths Hus museum. He was awarded the Sergel Prize in 1955.

== Training ==
In 1915, Hjorth spent a month studying under Caleb Althin and a month studying under G. Hallström. He took a break from his studies from 1915 to 1919 due to illness, before enrolling at the Royal Danish Academy of Fine Arts in Copenhagen for a year and a half, followed by four years studying sculpture in Paris under Antoine Bourdelle.

== Style, background and works ==
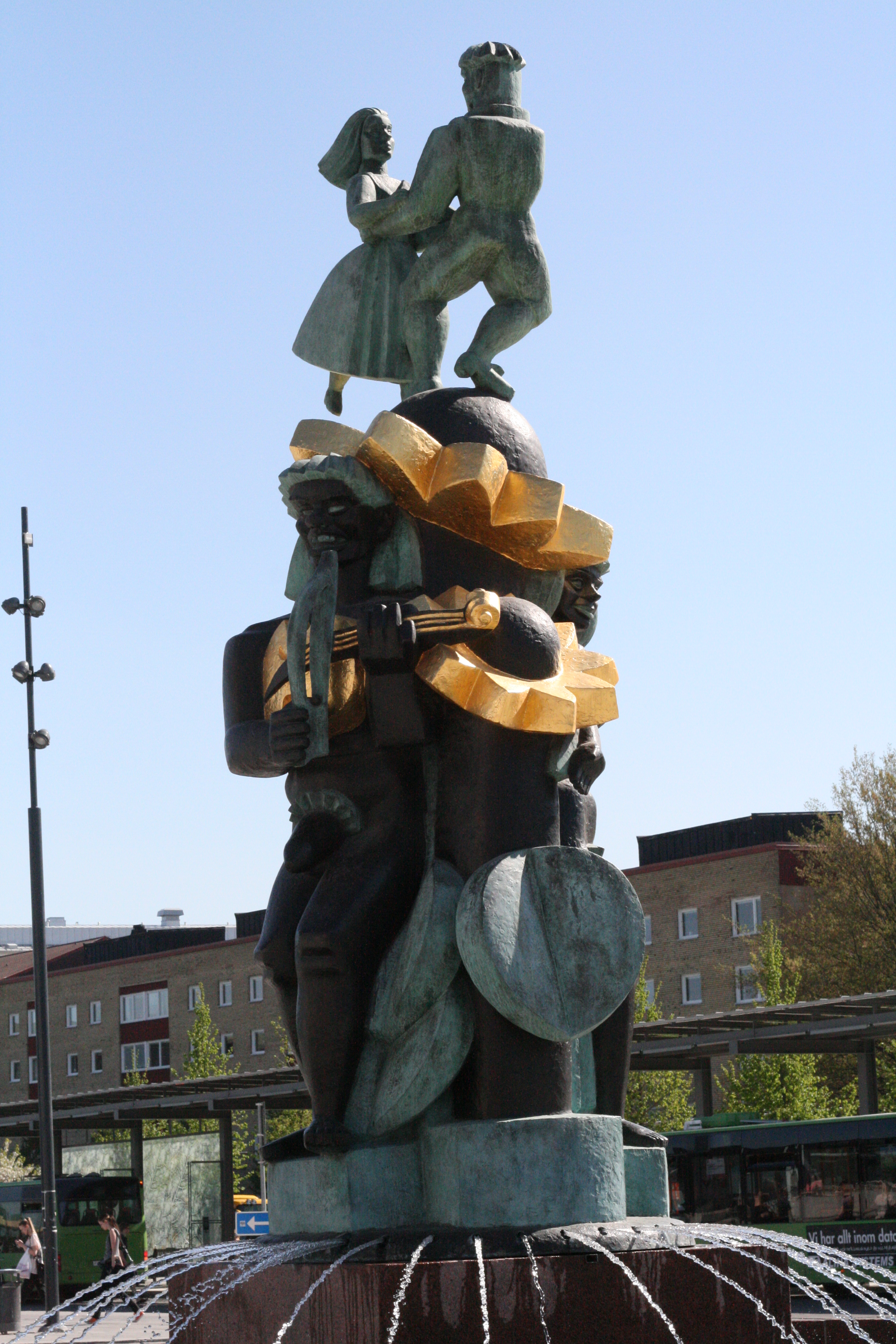
Näckens polska statues and fountain in front of Uppsala Central railway station

Hjorth is known for his figures, which are often roughly carved in wood and decorated using only a few bright colours. He also painted a number of landscapes and studio interiors. He grew up among farmers and woodlanders in Dalboda, where he came into contact with local styles of music which came to have a great influence on his work. He showed promising artistic tendencies from an early age - his schoolbooks were decorated with sketches, but this did not prevent him from completing his studies - and his artistic skills continued to flourish in later life. His Kärlek (Love) sculptures, which he completed in the 1930s, were highly controversial and widely misunderstood..

Highlights of his extensive work include:

- Kubistisk flicka (Cubist Girl), sculpture, 1921
- Visdomens Brunn (The Fount of Wisdom), sculpture, 1933
- Begravningen (The Burial), painting, 1925

One indication of Hjorth's significance as an artist is that the Swedish Post Office has on three occasions (including the 100th anniversary of his birth in 1995) issued postage stamps featuring his work.

== Public works ==
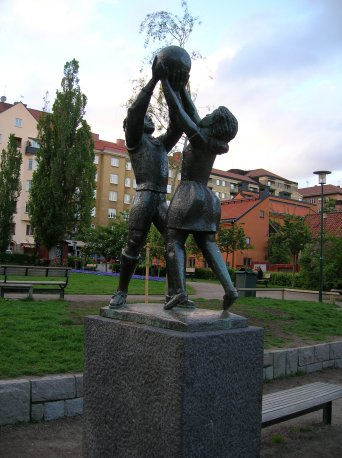
The sculpture Lek (Play), 1935, on Nytorget in Stockholm

- Altarpieces at Salabackekyrkan, Uppsala and Jukkasjärvi Church
- Reliefs at Skogskyrkogården in Stockholm and in Borås
- Work at the Workers' Educational Association in Stockholm
- Works at the theatre and municipal buildings in Norrköping
- Näckens polska, sculpture and fountain outside Uppsala Central railway station.
- Statue of Anders Ljungqvist (Gås-Anders) next to the church in Björklinge

== Galleries where works can be seen ==
- Swedish National Museum, Stockholm
- The Moderna museet museum of modern art, Stockholm
- Gothenburg Museum of Art, Gothenburg
- Malmö Art Museum, Malmö
- Waldemarsudde, Stockholm
- Norwegian National Gallery, Oslo
- National Gallery of Denmark, Copenhagen
