= Årsta, Uppsala =

District in Uppsala, Sweden

Coordinates: 59°52′0.1″N 17°41′10″E

- District of Uppsala
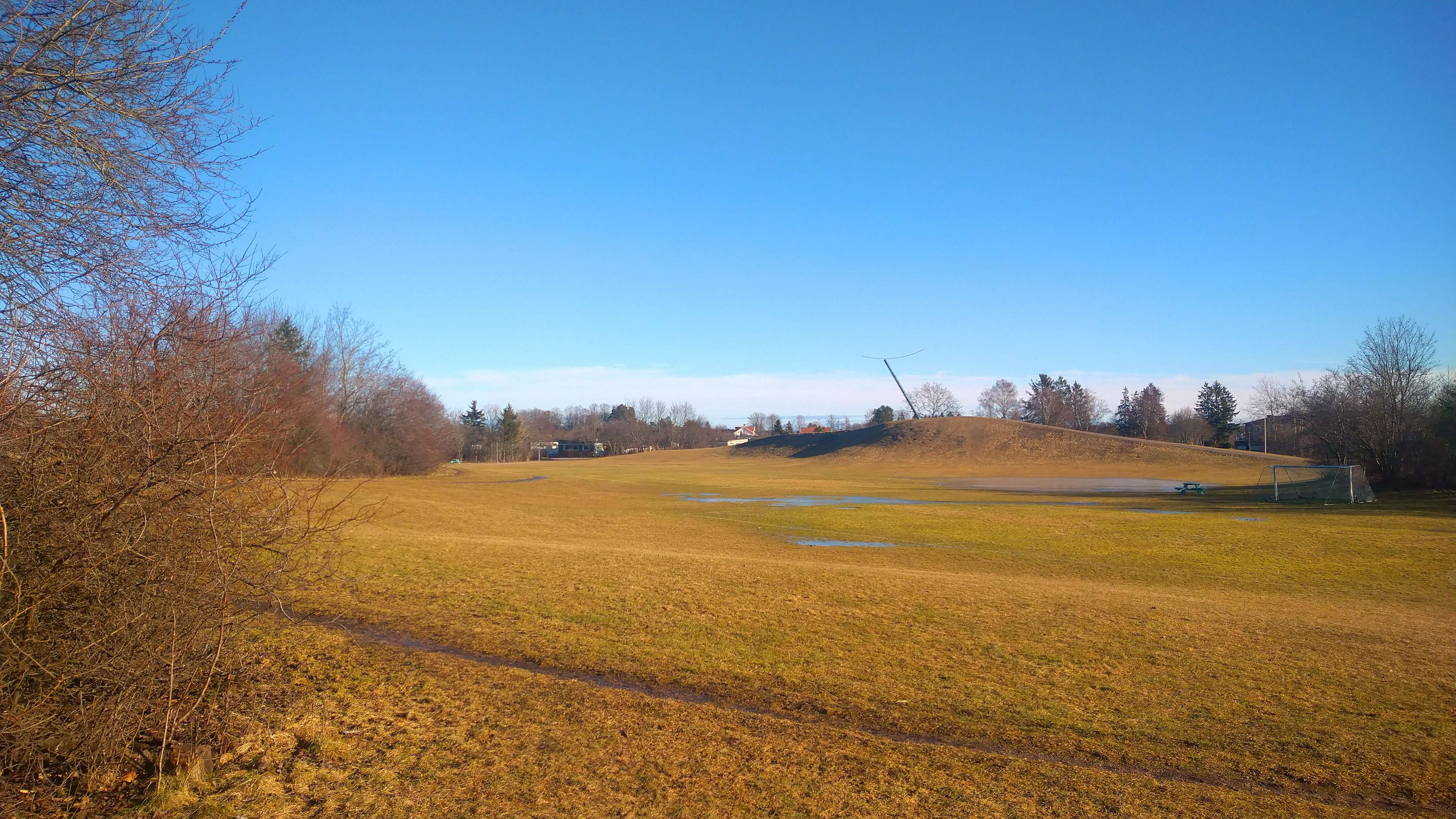
- A field, with a hill and a sculpture in Årstaparken
- Interactive map of Årsta, Uppsala
- Country: Sweden
- County: Uppsala County
- Municipality: Uppsala Municipality

Area
  - Total: 2.07 km^{2} (0.80 sq mi)

Population (2021)
  - Total: 6,028
  - Density: 2,910/km^{2} (7,540/sq mi)
- Time zone: UTC+1 (CET)
  - Summer (DST): UTC+2 (CEST)

Årsta is a district in Uppsala, Sweden, located in the east of the city, between Gränbystaden and Fyrislund, with Årstaparken as the approximate center. The area contains both apartment blocks, row homes and single family homes. The central square, Årsta Centrum, contains among other things a supermarket, and a health centre. The facilitys has been upgraded in recent years, but at the same time shops and community services have been reduced. The is currently slated to be redeveloped, with newly built housing and commercial spaces, as part of wider development of the nearby area known as Östra Sala Backe.

Before 1970, the district was near-urban countryside with sparser settlements, horticulture and cornfields. Today, the area consists of several styles of development, including 6 story apartment blocks along Fyrislundsgatan, with the eastern half mainly consisting of two story condominium associations and the western half single family homes. Along Fyrislundsgatan, which forms the border to Sala Backe, there used to run a powerline which since has been removed, creating a large, empty grassy strip. The area, now known as Östra Sala Backe, is being developed as a high density mixed-use area.

Årsta was planned according to a model that was common in the 1970s, with the aim of completely separating car traffic from the built-up area. As there are no through streets, all transport by motor vehicle must take place on the periphery of the area. The district is built so that it frames a larger, centrally located park area (Årstaparken). There is a network of pedestrian and cycle paths that connect homes with the area's center and schools without crossing car streets. Two pedestrian and bicycle tunnels under Fyrislundsgatan have connected them in the direction of the city centre and Gränby. With housing starting to be built along the former power line since 2015, one tunnel has been rebuilt from scratch and the other will disappear.

Årsta is named after the village "Aristu", mentioned as early as 1344. The prefix "Ari" is here a man's name, and the suffix "-sta" is Old Swedish, with the meaning stadher, "place or area". Immediately north of Årsta is the medieval Vaksala Church with its tall spire, clearly visible from many places in the district. Near Årsta Centrum there's also a local church, Årstakyrkan.

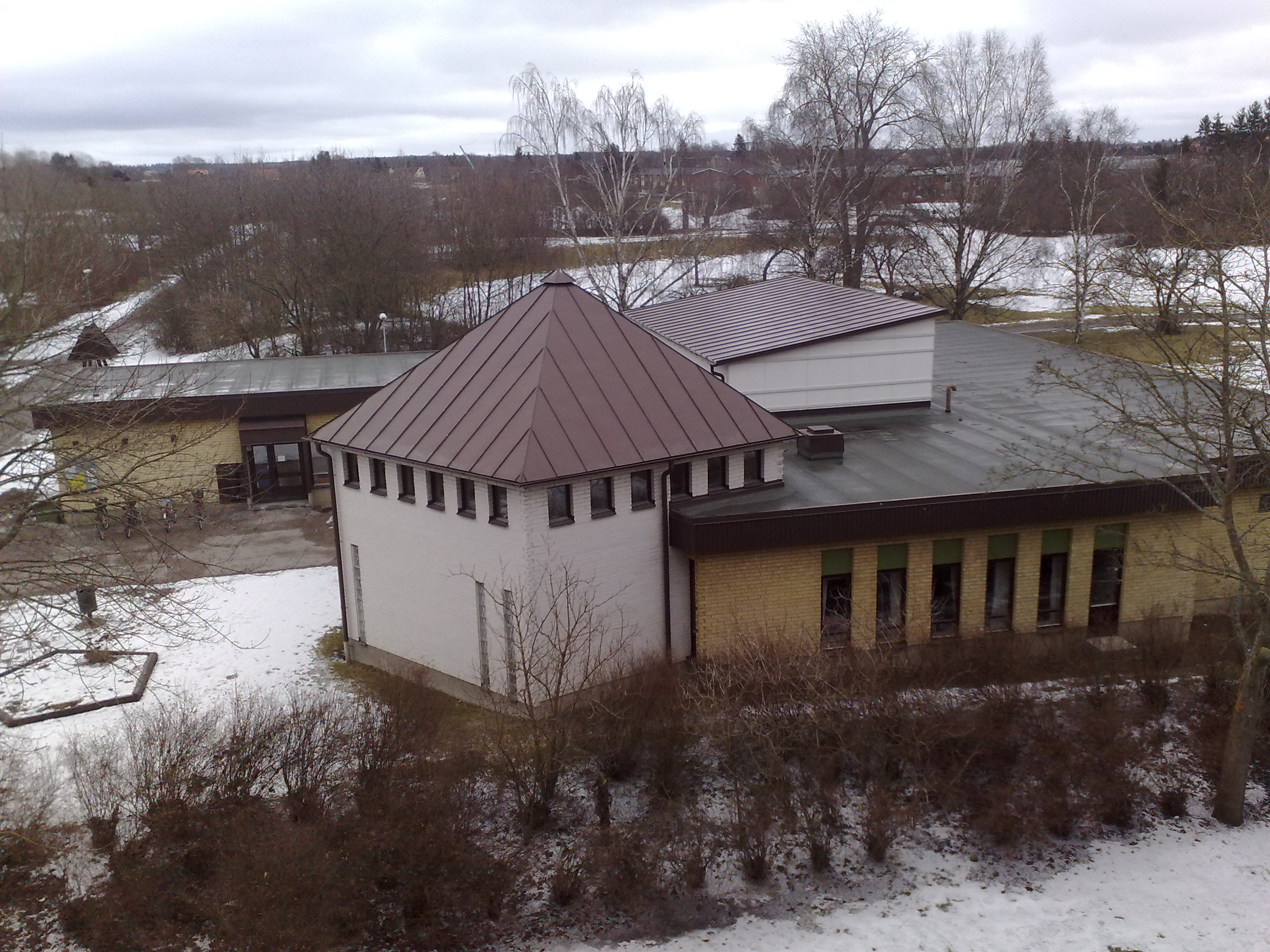
Årstakyrkan

== Transportation ==
=== Road ===
As there are only a few through roads, transportation within Årsta generally consists of walking and cycling, as there is an abundance of foot and cycle paths. For outside connections by car, the E4 highway passes to the east of the district, while Fyrislundsgatan and Fålhagsleden provide the main connections to the rest of Uppsala.

=== Public Transport ===
Årsta is served by five city bus lines, operated by UL. Bus lines 7 and 1 have stops in the west, around Årsta Centrum. Line 4 has its terminus in the northeast, which is the only stop located inside of the district, while all the other ones are on the roads surrounding it. Lines 6 and 30 stop in the south, on Fålhagsleden. Line 30 is a "mjuk", or soft line, which is adapted to elderly and disabled people.

In Årsta, the Lennakatten museum railway has a station.
