= Årsta Church, Uppsala =

Church in Årsta, Sweden

Coordinates: 59°51′57.6″N 17°41′8.1″E

Årsta Church
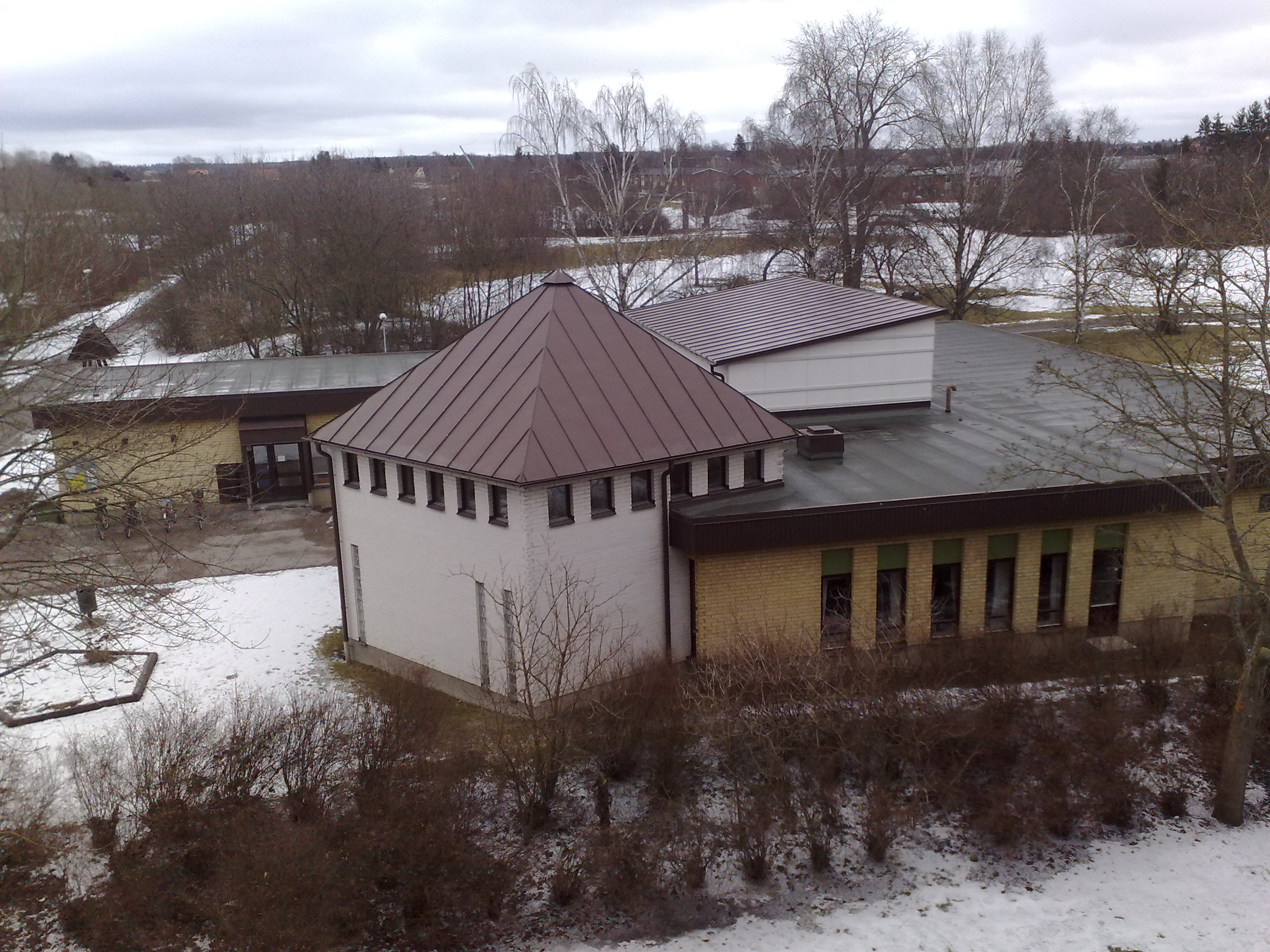

Religion
- Affiliation: Church of Sweden
- Province: Vaksala parish, Archdiocese of Uppsala
- Region: Uppsala County
- Status: Active

Location
- Location: Årsta, Uppsala, Sweden
- State: Sweden
- Interactive map of Årsta Church

Architecture
- Architect: Samuel Fränne
- Type: Church
- Completed: 1974

Website
- www.svenskakyrkan.se/uppsala/arstakyrkan

Årsta Church (Swedish: Årstakyrkan) is a church in Årsta, Uppsala, Sweden that was built in 1974, and was designed by Samuel Fränne. The church was originally owned by the Uppsala Missionary Congregation, but is now a district church in Vaksala parish. It has an ecumenical cooperation with the Swedish Salvation Army.

The church also runs a pre-school for children who are 0–5 years old.

== Gallery ==
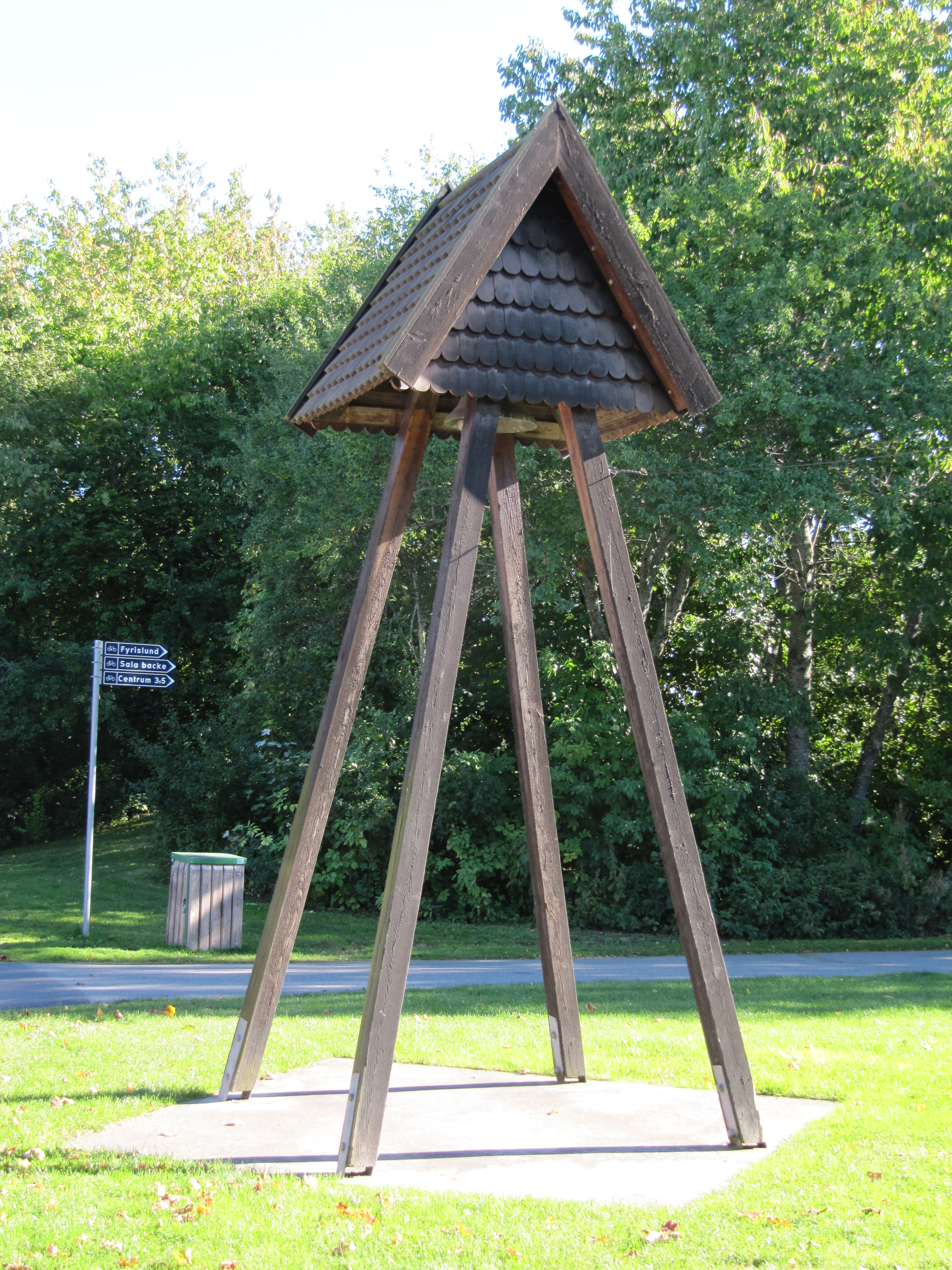
Clock tower

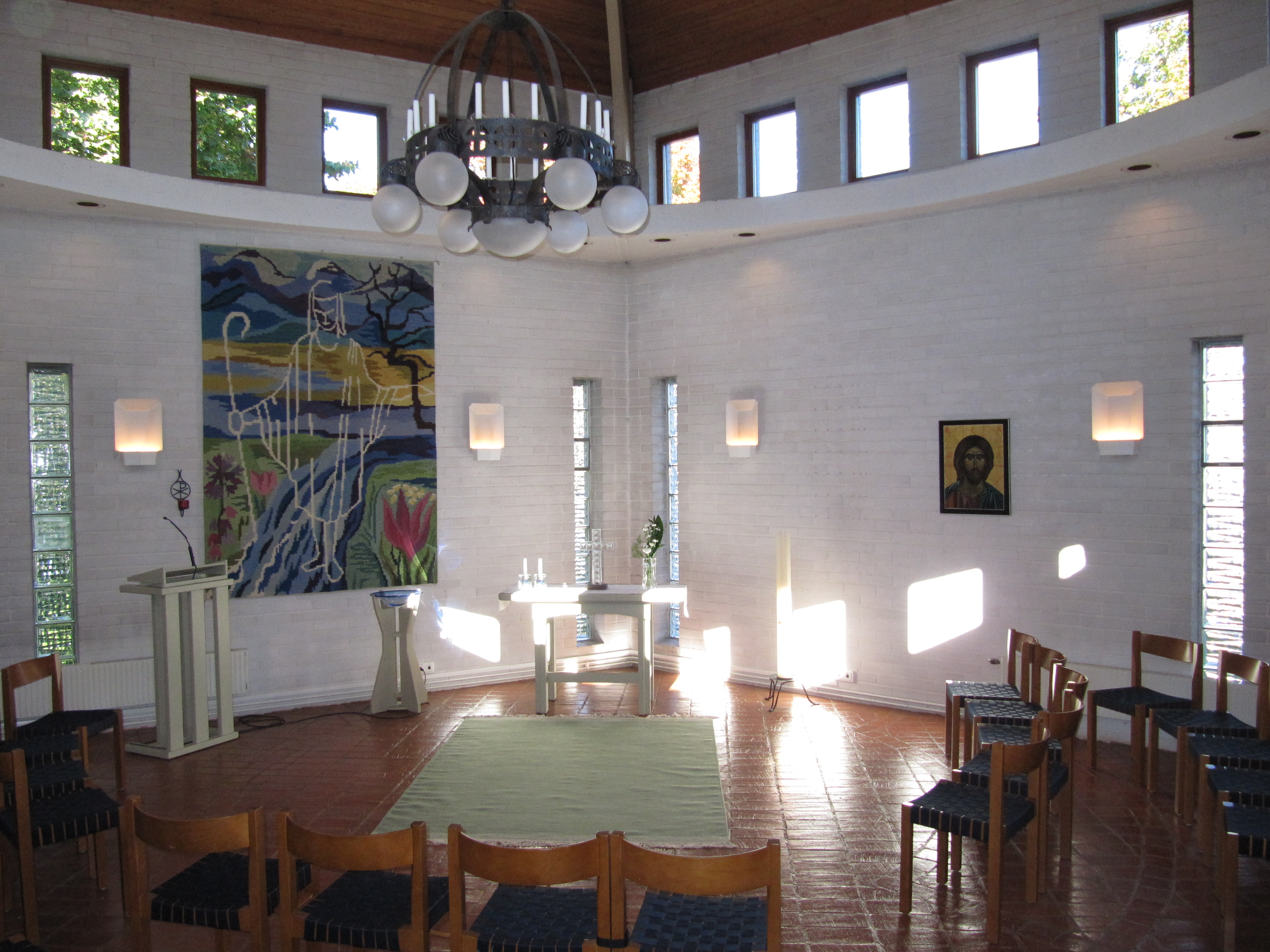
Interior
