= Årsta =

Årsta may refer to:

- Årsta district, Stockholm, Sweden, part of Enskede-Årsta-Vantör borough
- Årsta Castle, a castle in the municipality of Haninge, Stockholm County
- Årsta, a district in Uppsala, Sweden
