= Älvkarleby Municipality =

Älvkarleby Municipality Älvkarleby kommun
- Municipality
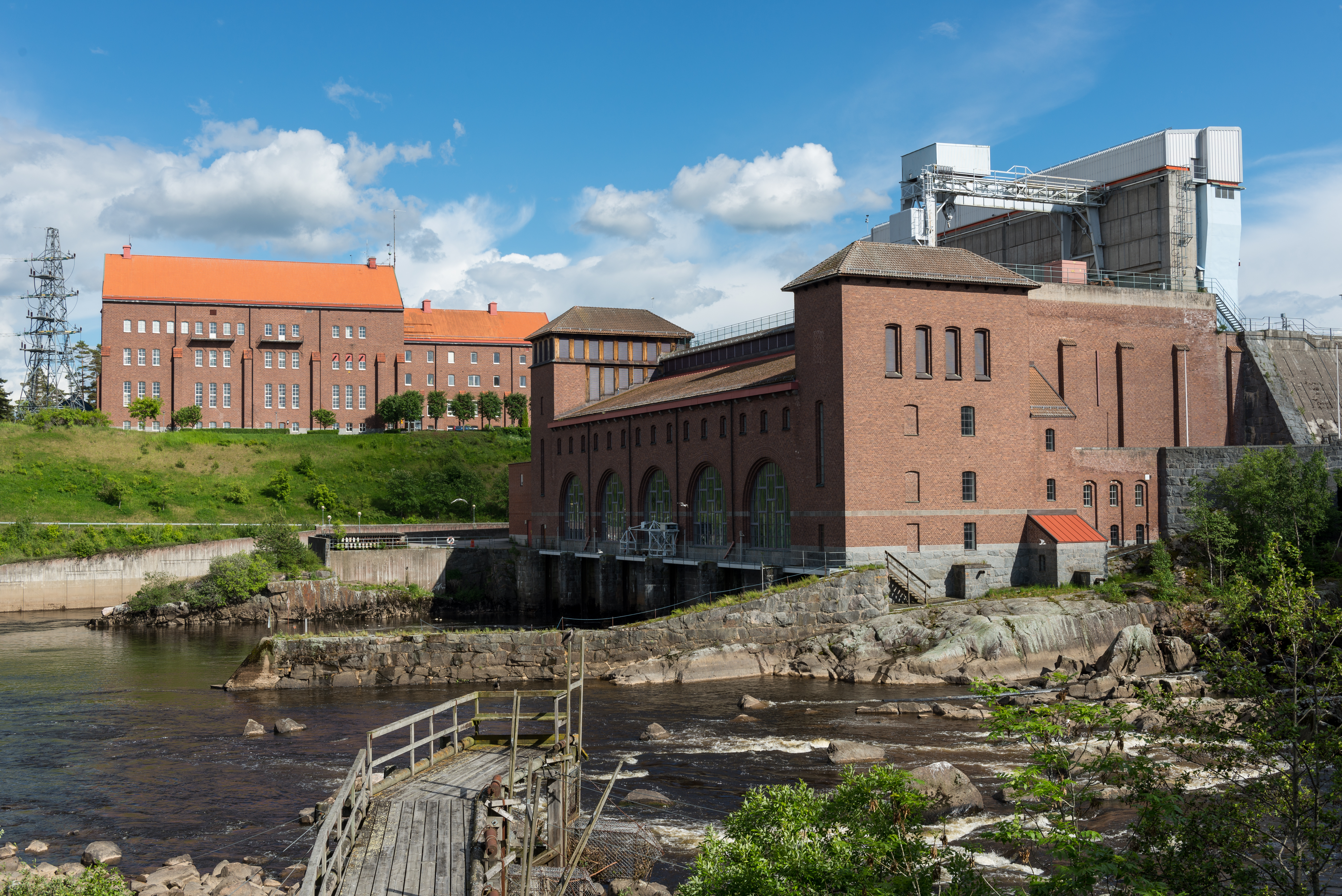

- Coat of arms

- Coordinates: 60°38′N 17°25′E
- Country: Sweden
- County: Uppsala County
- Seat: Skutskär

Area
  - Total: 614.13 km^{2} (237.12 sq mi)
  - Land: 214.98 km^{2} (83.00 sq mi)
  - Water: 399.15 km^{2} (154.11 sq mi)
- Area as of 1 January 2014.

Population (30 June 2025)
  - Total: 9,617
  - Density: 44.73/km^{2} (115.9/sq mi)
- Time zone: UTC+1 (CET)
  - Summer (DST): UTC+2 (CEST)
- ISO 3166 code: SE
- Province: Uppland
- Municipal code: 0319
- Website: www.alvkarleby.se

Älvkarleby Municipality (Swedish: Älvkarleby kommun) is a municipality in Uppsala County in east central Sweden. Its seat is located in the town of Skutskär.

The municipality is one of few in the country which has not been amalgamated since it was created out of a parish when the first local government acts of Sweden were implemented in 1863.

== Localities ==
- Gårdskär
- Marma
- Skutskär (seat)
- Älvkarleby

== History ==
Not until late in the Bronze Age (10th century BC) did parts of what is now Älvkarleby begin to rise out of the Baltic Sea. Remains of settlements from that period has been found in the area. In the Early Iron Age (6th-12th century) the population began to grow and people supported themselves on farming, hunting, fishing and livestock. The first mention of Älvkarleby is found in documents from the early Middle Ages (13th century).

Älvkarleby was the hometown of the author Stig Dagerman.

== Demographics ==
This is a demographic table based on Älvkarleby Municipality's electoral districts in the 2022 Swedish general election sourced from SVT's election platform, in turn taken from SCB official statistics.

In total there were 9,614 residents, including 7,312 Swedish citizens of voting age resident in the municipality. 46.4% voted for the left coalition and 52.2% for the right coalition, a stark reversal from previous elections dominated by the Social Democrats. Indicators are in percentage points except population totals and income.

Location	Residents	Citizen adults	Left vote	Right vote	Employed	Swedish parents	Foreign heritage	Income SEK	Degree
Location			%	%					
Boda	1,729	1,352	46.6	52.0	86	88	12	27,149	29
Gårdskär	553	473	53.2	46.1	80	90	10	23,746	32
Jungfruholmen	2,028	1,501	43.7	54.3	79	79	21	24,983	30
Skutskärs C	2,522	1,804	50.7	47.5	69	69	31	20,236	24
Älvkarleö-Marma	1,058	837	41.7	57.3	81	85	15	23,863	27
Östanån	1,724	1,345	45.0	54.3	83	89	11	26,989	32
Source: SVT

== Elections ==
These are the election results since the 1972 municipal reform. The results of the Sweden Democrats were not published by the SCB between 1988 and 1998 due to the party's small size nationally so has been denoted as "0.0". Älvkarleby has traditionally seen outright majorities for the Social Democrats, although in 2010 and 2014 the party fell just short of 50% of ballots cast in the municipality.

=== Riksdag ===
Year	Turnout	Votes	V	S	MP	C	L	KD	M	SD	ND
1973	92.7	6,525	5.2	71.7	0.0	14.1	4.6	0.5	3.8	0.0	0.0
1976	94.0	6,727	4.0	71.6	0.0	13.1	5.8	0.6	4.8	0.0	0.0
1979	92.9	6,666	4.8	71.1	0.0	10.5	6.5	0.6	6.4	0.0	0.0
1982	93.4	6,650	4.6	72.8	0.9	8.6	3.3	0.7	8.9	0.0	0.0
1985	92.1	6,507	4.8	72.5	1.0	5.8	8.1	0.0	7.8	0.0	0.0
1988	88.4	6,096	6.3	68.4	3.2	5.9	8.4	1.1	6.3	0.0	0.0
1991	88.1	6,043	5.1	63.6	1.8	4.1	6.8	3.0	8.5	0.0	6.5
1994	88.7	6,108	6.2	71.6	3.0	2.8	4.8	1.2	8.8	0.0	0.9
1998	81.7	5,460	16.8	56.8	3.3	2.2	3.3	5.6	10.4	0.0	0.0
2002	79.5	5,317	10.0	61.2	3.4	3.1	8.1	4.8	6.7	2.3	0.0
2006	82.5	5,558	7.6	54.7	3.5	4.6	5.0	3.7	14.6	3.8	0.0
2010	84.8	5,874	6.8	49.0	5.2	3.2	5.0	2.5	19.3	7.9	0.0
2014	86.7	6,036	6.2	47.1	3.8	3.1	2.8	2.2	12.8	19.9	0.0

Blocs

This lists the relative strength of the socialist and centre-right blocs since 1973, but parties not elected to the Riksdag are inserted as "other", including the Sweden Democrats results from 1988 to 2006, but also the Christian Democrats pre-1991 and the Greens in 1982, 1985 and 1991. The sources are identical to the table above. The coalition or government mandate marked in bold formed the government after the election. New Democracy got elected in 1991 but are still listed as "other" due to the short lifespan of the party.

Year	Turnout	Votes	Left	Right	SD	Other	Elected
1973	92.7	6,525	**76.9**	22.5	0.0	0.6	99.4
1976	94.0	6,727	75.6	**23.7**	0.0	0.7	99.3
1979	92.9	6,666	75.9	**23.4**	0.0	0.7	99.3
1982	93.4	6,650	**77.4**	20.8	0.0	2.0	98.0
1985	92.1	6,507	**77.3**	21.7	0.0	1.0	99.0
1988	88.4	6,096	**77.9**	20.6	0.0	1.5	98.5
1991	88.1	6,043	68.7	**22.4**	0.0	8.9	97.6
1994	88.7	6,108	**80.8**	17.6	0.0	1.6	98.4
1998	81.7	5,460	**76.9**	21.5	0.0	1.6	98.4
2002	79.5	5,317	**74.6**	22.7	0.0	2.7	97.3
2006	82.5	5,558	65.8	**27.9**	0.0	6.3	93.7
2010	84.8	5,874	61.0	**30.0**	7.9	1.1	98.9
2014	86.7	6,036	**57.1**	20.8	19.9	2.2	97.8

== See also ==
- Gamlakarleby / Karleby
- Nykarleby
