= Gårdskär =

- Location within Uppsala Location within Sweden
- Coordinates: 60°37′N 17°35′E
- Country: Sweden
- Province: Uppland
- County: Uppsala County
- Municipality: Älvkarleby Municipality

Area
  - Total: 0.71 km^{2} (0.27 sq mi)

Population (31 December 2020)
  - Total: 352
  - Density: 500/km^{2} (1,300/sq mi)
- Time zone: UTC+1 (CET)
  - Summer (DST): UTC+2 (CEST)

Gårdskär (Swedish pronunciation: [ˈɡoːʈʂɧæːr]) is a locality situated in Älvkarleby Municipality, Uppsala County, Sweden with 352 inhabitants in 2010.
