= Älgen Stolta =

Swedish domesticated moose

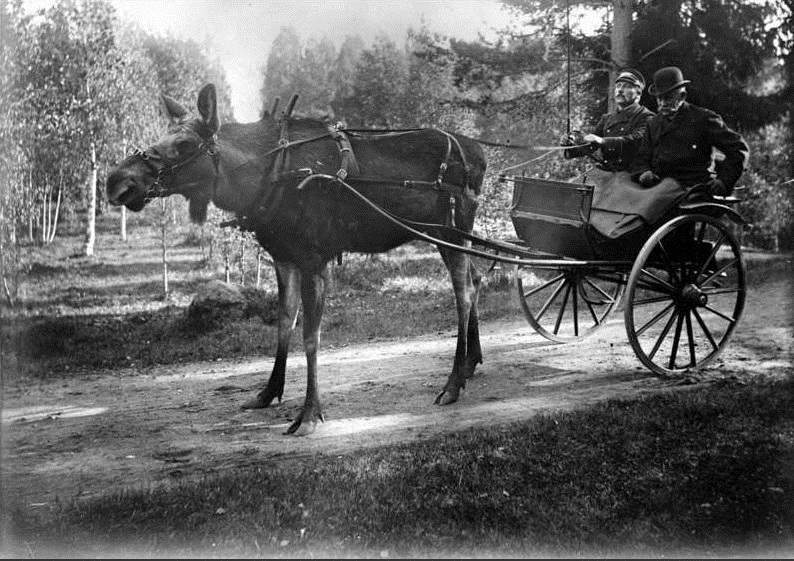
Stolta pulls men in a horse-cart, c. 1908, with Anders Jansson at reins with Johan Blad

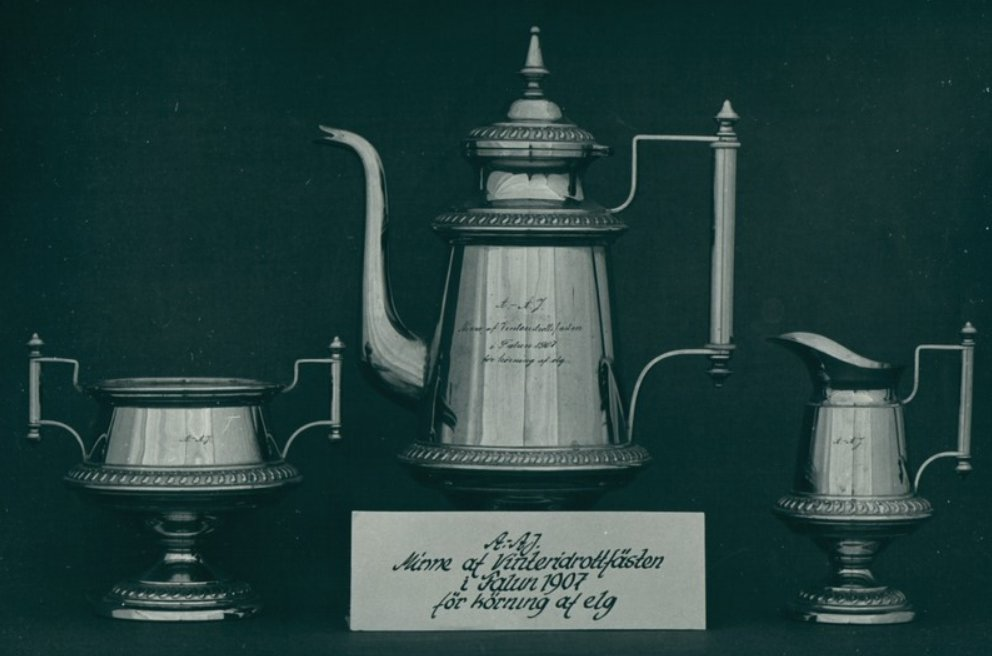
Stolta's commemorative coffee service award 1907

Älgen Stolta was a moose that became known for participating in a trot racing event in Falun, Sweden, in 1907. In Swedish, Älgen means "the moose" and Stolta means "proud".

== History ==
In the early 1900s, a moose cow (adult female) died, leaving her year-old calf behind. Different sources claim the cow was killed by a passing train, others that it drowned, but they agree it happened near the Dalälven river close to Älvkarleby in Uppland. Its live female calf was taken to Johan Blad, the foreman at Älvkarleö's railway park. Blad knew a lineman called Anders Gustav Jansson who lived in Älvkarleby and had a reputation for animal husbandry, so he asked for his help with the moose which they named Stolta. Stolta was raised like a tame horse; doing forestry work, pulling carts and sleds with material, and also used to pull a sled carrying tourists between the railway station and the tourist hotel near the waterfall in Älvkarleby.

In 1907, at a winter sports festival in Falun, Stolta won a trot race against trained trotting horses over an ice-covered lake. Jansson was afterwards presented with a coffee service: a coffee pot and accompanying sugar bowl and coffee creamer. The coffee pot had an inscription that read Minne av Vinteridrottsfästen i Falun 1907 för körning av elg ("Memento of Winter Sports Festival in Falun in 1907 for driving with a moose"). The park where Älgen Stolta was kept closed in 1909 as the area was marked as part of the reservoir for a hydroelectric power station. Stolta was moved to the open-air museum of Skansen on the island of Djurgården in Stockholm where it was thought she could be better cared for, and her name was changed to "Lotta." After the 1907 race, a rule prohibiting the use of moose as draft animals was added. She died in Stockholm in 1925.
