= Björklinge runestones =

Viking Age memorial runestones in Björklinge, Uppsala County, Sweden

Coordinates: 60.0269°N 17.5524°E

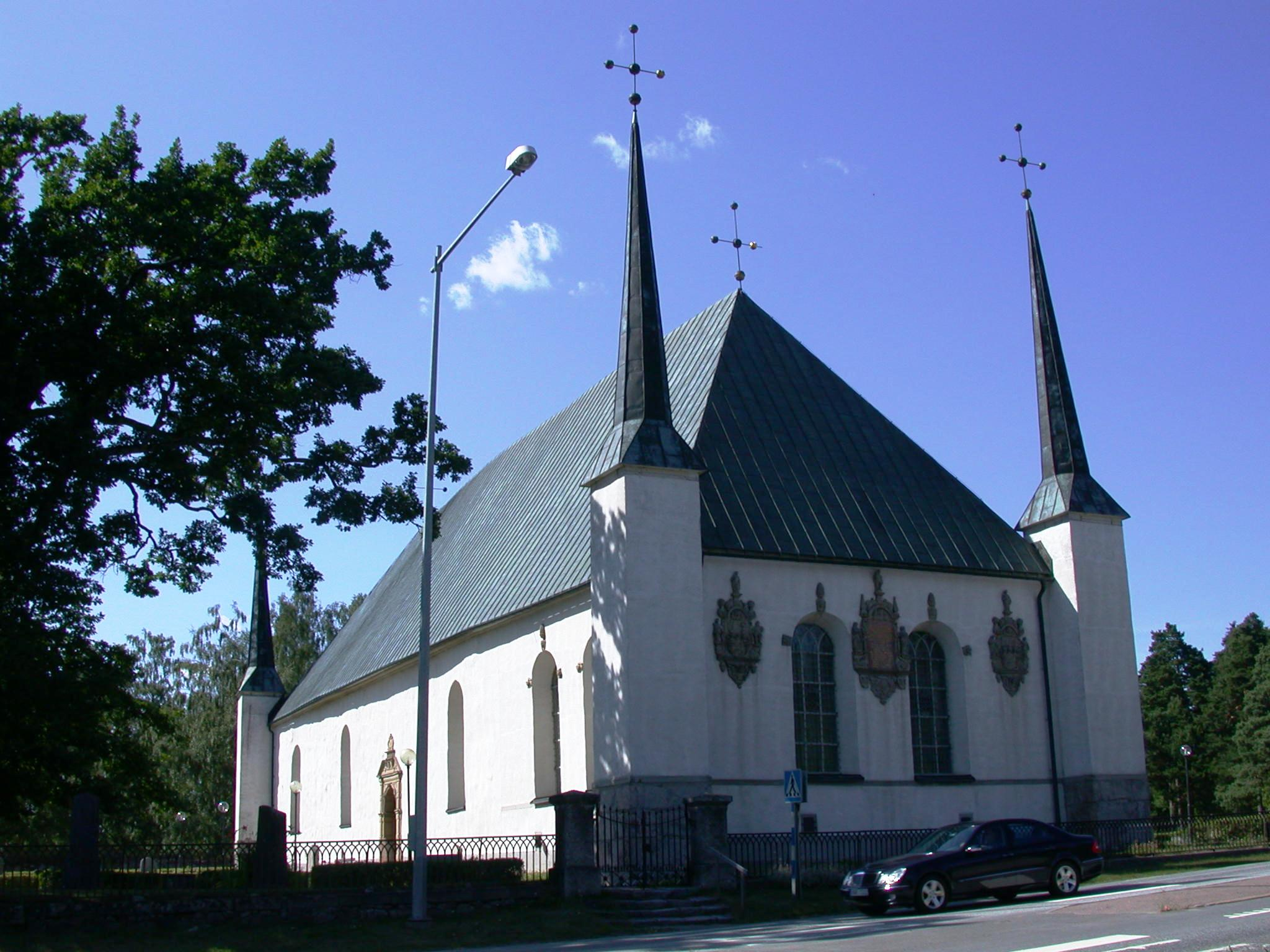
The church at Björklinge, Uppland, Sweden.

The Björklinge runestones are five Viking Age memorial runestones designated in the Rundata catalog as U 1045, U 1046, U 1047, U 1048, and U 1050 that are located at the church in Björklinge, Uppsala County, Sweden, which is in the historic province of Uppland. In addition, there is a small fragment of a runestone with a partial runic text i * lit * rita * meaning "had erected" that has been given the catalog number U 1049.

== U 1045 ==
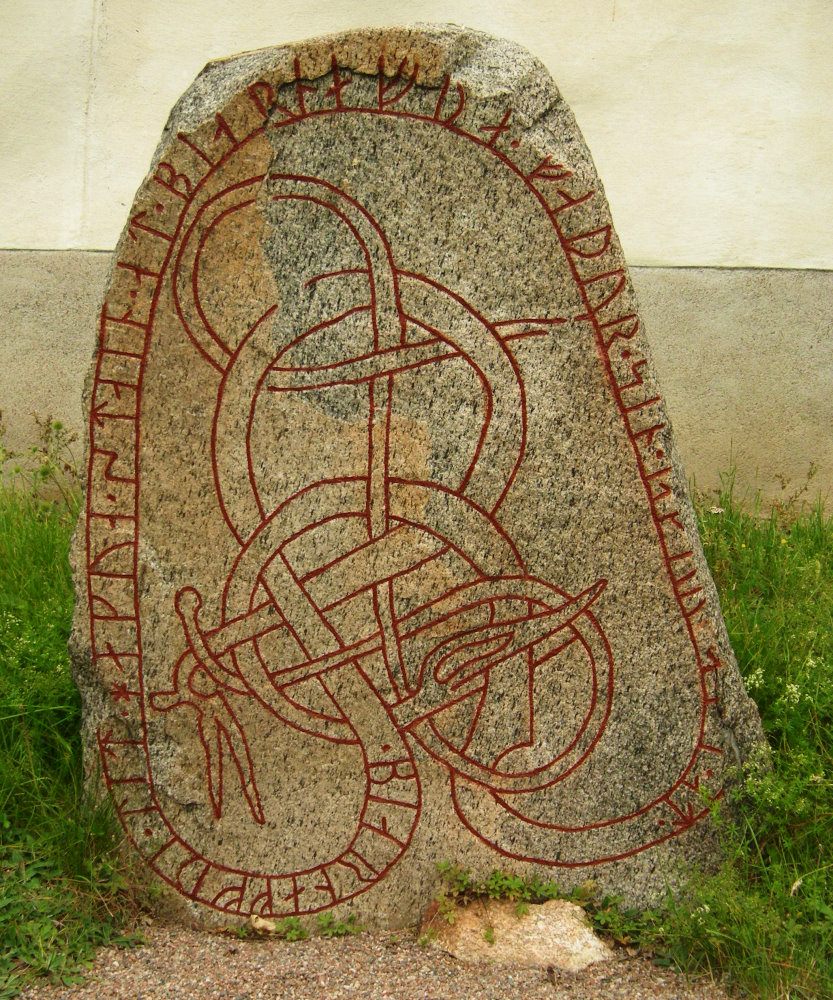
Runestone U 1045.

Runic inscription U 1045 is the Rundata catalog number for this inscription on a granite stone that is 1.3 meters in height. The stone was moved to its current location outside the church south side in 1920. The inscription consists of runic text in the younger futhark on a serpent. It is classified as being carved in runestone style Pr4 or Pr5, both of which are also known as Urnes style. This runestone style is characterized by slim and stylized animals that are interwoven into tight patterns. The animal heads are typically seen in profile with slender almond-shaped eyes and upwardly curled appendages on the noses and the necks.

The runic text states that the stone was raised by Bjarnhôfði in memory of his father, who had the same name. A fragment of another runestone, inscription U 1113, with a partial inscription consisting of just this name was found about 1 kilometer to the west near Häggeby.

' biarnaffþi ' lit ' hakua ' stain ' at ' biarnafþa ' faþur ' sin -ak-- ' s...- ' at '
{} Biarnhofði {} let {} haggva {} stæin {} at {} Biarnhofða, {} faður {} sinn ... {} ... {} <at>. {}
Bjarnhôfði had the stone cut in memory of Bjarnhôfði, his father ... ...

== U 1046 ==
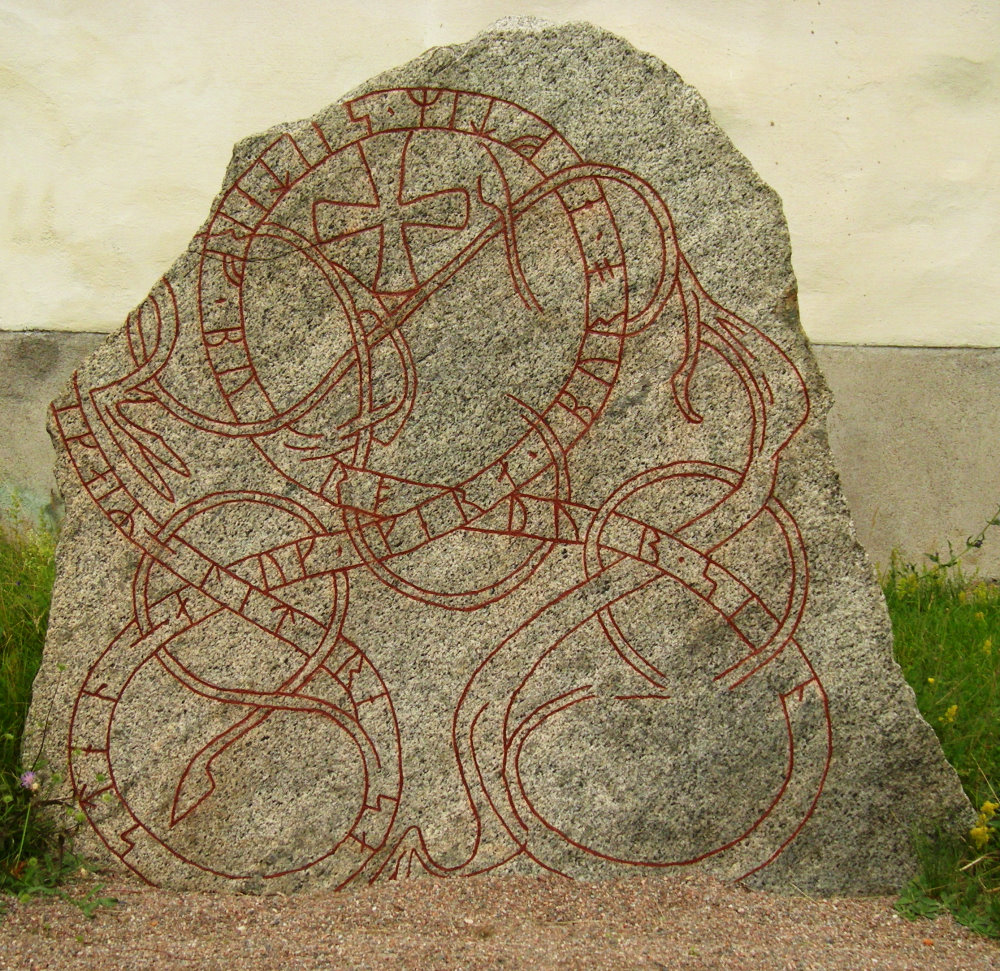
Runestone U 1046.

Runic inscription U 1046 is the Rundata listing for an inscription on a granite stone that is 1.65 meters in height and was moved to its current location south of the church in 1920. It consists of runic text carved on an intertwined serpent with a Christian cross in the upper center of the design. The inscription is classified as being carved in runestone style Pr4, or Urnes style. Based upon stylistic analysis, this inscription has been attributed to the runemaster Öpir, who was active during the late 11th century and early 12th century in Uppland.

The runic text states that a bridge and the stone were raised as a memorial by a man to his brother named either Sædjarfr or Sigdjarfr. The reference to bridge-building is fairly common in runestones during this time period. Some are Christian references related to passing the bridge into the afterlife. At this time, the Catholic Church sponsored the building of roads and bridges through a practice similar to the use of indulgences in return for the church's intercession for the soul of the departed. There are many examples of these bridge stones dated from the eleventh century, including runic inscriptions Sö 101 in Ramsund, U 489 in Morby, and U 617 in Bro.

...ikaiʀ lit resa sten auk ' kera ' buro ' eftiʀ ' siiterf * buroþur * sin
...gæiʀʀ let ræisa stæin ok {} gæra {} bro {} æftiʀ {} Sædiarf/Sigdiarf, {} broður {} sinn.
...-geirr had the stone raised and the bridge made in memory of Sædjarfr/Sigdjarfr, his brother.

== U 1047 ==
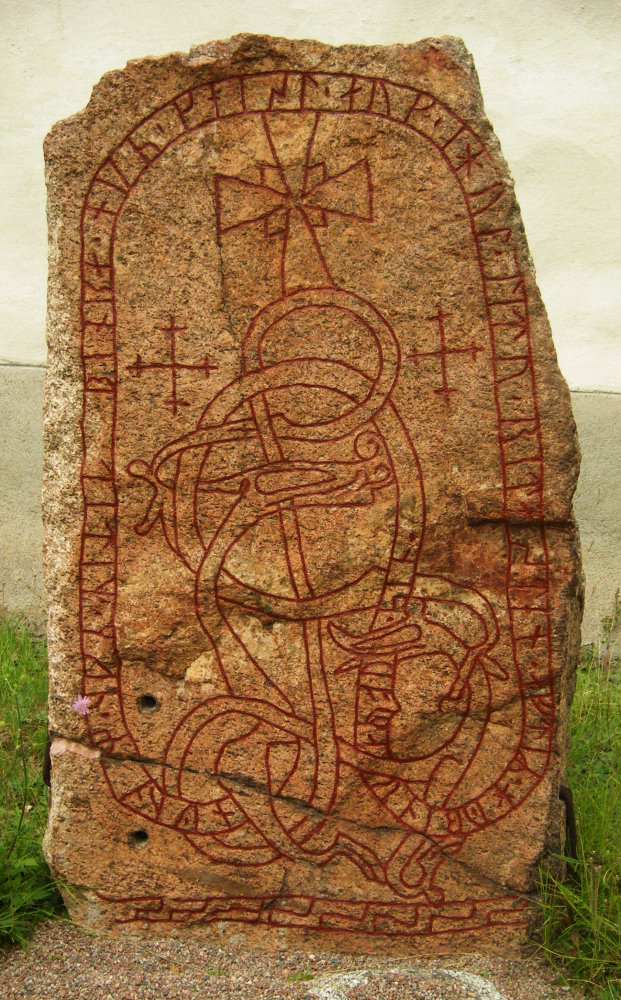
Runestone U 1047.

Runic inscription U 1047 is the Rundata listing for an inscription on a granite stone that is 1.55 meters in height. The stone was discovered during the removal of a churchyard wall in 1865. The inscription consists of runic text on an intertwined serpent that circles three Christian crosses. It is classified as being carved in runestone style Pr4, which is also known as Urnes style. Based upon stylistic comparison to inscription U 1111 in Eke, the inscription has been attributed to a runemaster named Ingulv. Ingulv signed inscriptions U 929 at the Uppsala Cathedral, U 1041 in Golvasta, U 1052 in Axlunda, and U 1075 in Bälinge. Another possibility that has been suggested is that it was carved by the runemaster Likbjörn. There are three inscriptions known to have been signed by Likbjörn, the now-lost U 1074 in Bälinge, U 1095 in Rörby, and U Fv1976;104, which was discovered in 1975 at the Uppsala Cathedral.

The runic text states that the stone was raised as a memorial by four brothers Eygeirr, Ketilbjôrn, Gísl, and Ígull in memory of their father Eybjôrn. One son, Ketilbjôrn, shares the common name element bjôrn ("bear") with his father. A common practice at that time in Scandinavia was the repeating one of the name elements from one parent in the names of children to show a family connection.

ayka-ʀ ' auk ' kitilbiarn ' auk ' keisl ' auk ' ihul ' litu ' rita sten ' eftiʀ hybiarn faþ ' sin '
Øygæ[i]ʀʀ {} ok {} Kætilbiorn {} ok {} Gisl(?) {} ok {} Igull {} letu {} retta stæin {} æftiʀ Øybiorn, faður {} sinn. {}
Eygeirr and Ketilbjôrn and Gísl(?) and Ígull had the stone erected in memory of Eybjôrn, their father.

== U 1048 ==
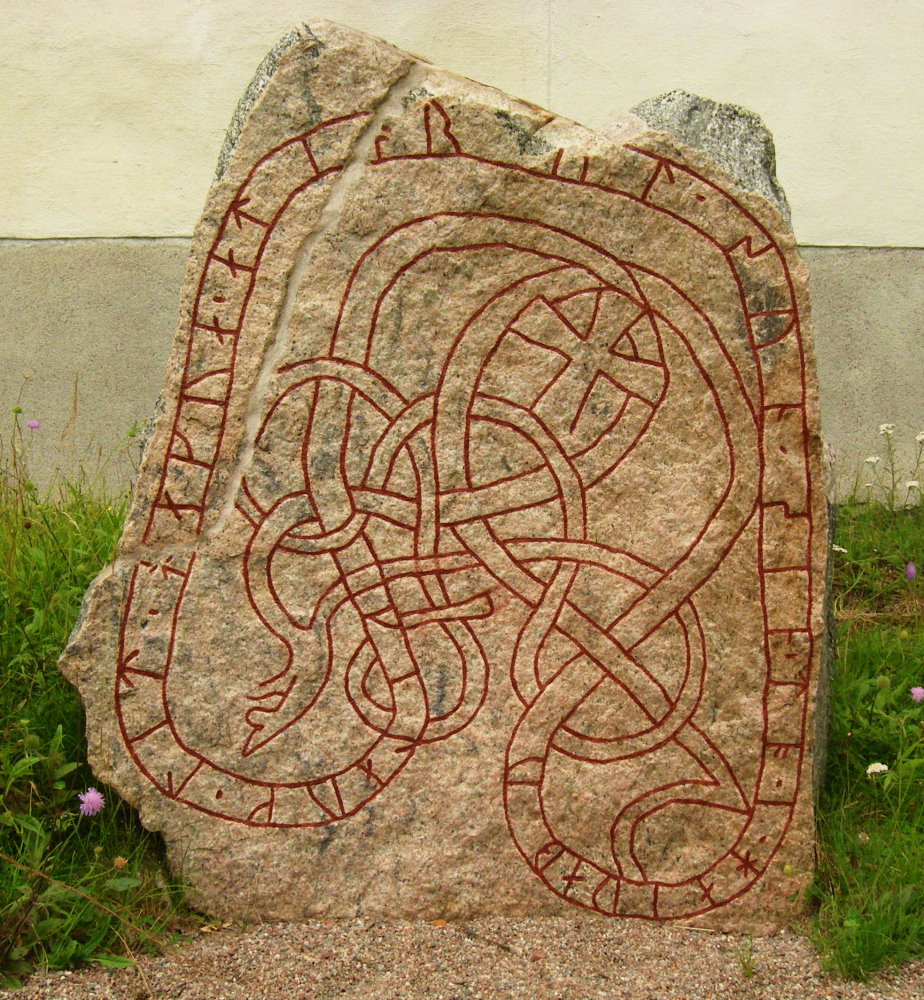
Runestone U 1048.

Runic inscription U 1048 is the Rundata catalog number of this inscription, which is on a granite runestone that is 1.3 meters in height. The inscription consists of runic text carved on an intertwined serpent and a Christian cross. The inscription is classified as being carved in runestone style Pr4, or Urnes style. Although unsigned, the inscription is considered to have been carved by the same runemaster that made inscriptions U 1050 at the same church and U 1060 in Tibble.

The runic text states that the stone was raised by a mother named Gillaug in memory of her son Jôrundr who died in Hedeby. It has been suggested that, due to the assumed date of the inscription in the late eleventh or early twelfth century, that the actual city referred to may have been that of Schleswig. After being attacked several times, the people of Hedeby relocated to the other side of the Schlei at Schleswig around 1050.

kilauk ' lit ' hakua ' at ' i(o)rut * sun sin ' (t)o ' i haiþaby
Gillaug {} let {} haggva {} at {} Iorund, {} sun sinn, {} do {} i Hæiðaby.
Gillaug had (the stone) cut in memory of Jôrundr, her son. (He) died in Hedeby.

== U 1050 ==
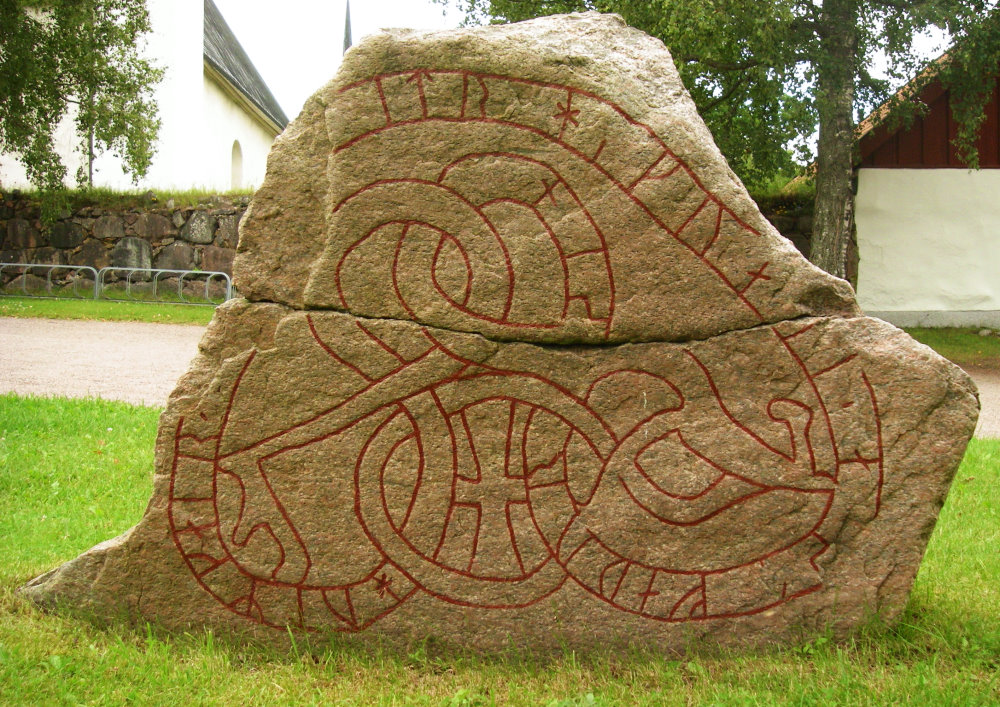
Runestone U 1050.

Runic inscription U 1050 is the Rundata listing for an inscription on a granite stone that is 1 meter in height. The inscription consists of runic text carved on an intertwined serpent. The inscription is classified as being carved in runestone style Pr 4, which is also known as Urnes style. Although unsigned, the inscription is considered to have been carved by the same runemaster that made inscriptions U 1048 at this same church and U 1060 in Tibble.

The inscription states that it was raised by some sons, one of which was named Holmgeirr, as a memorial for their father Eistr.

hulmkair ' ... ...itu h--ua a[t] ' a(i)s[t] faþur sin
Holmgæiʀʀ {} ... [l]etu h[agg]va at {} Æist, faður sinn.
Holmgeirr ... had ... cut in memory of Eistr, their father.

== See also ==
- List of runestones
