= Sala Backe =

District in Uppsala, Sweden

Coordinates: 59°52′12.3″N 17°40′9.4″E

Sala Backe, Uppsala
- District of Uppsala
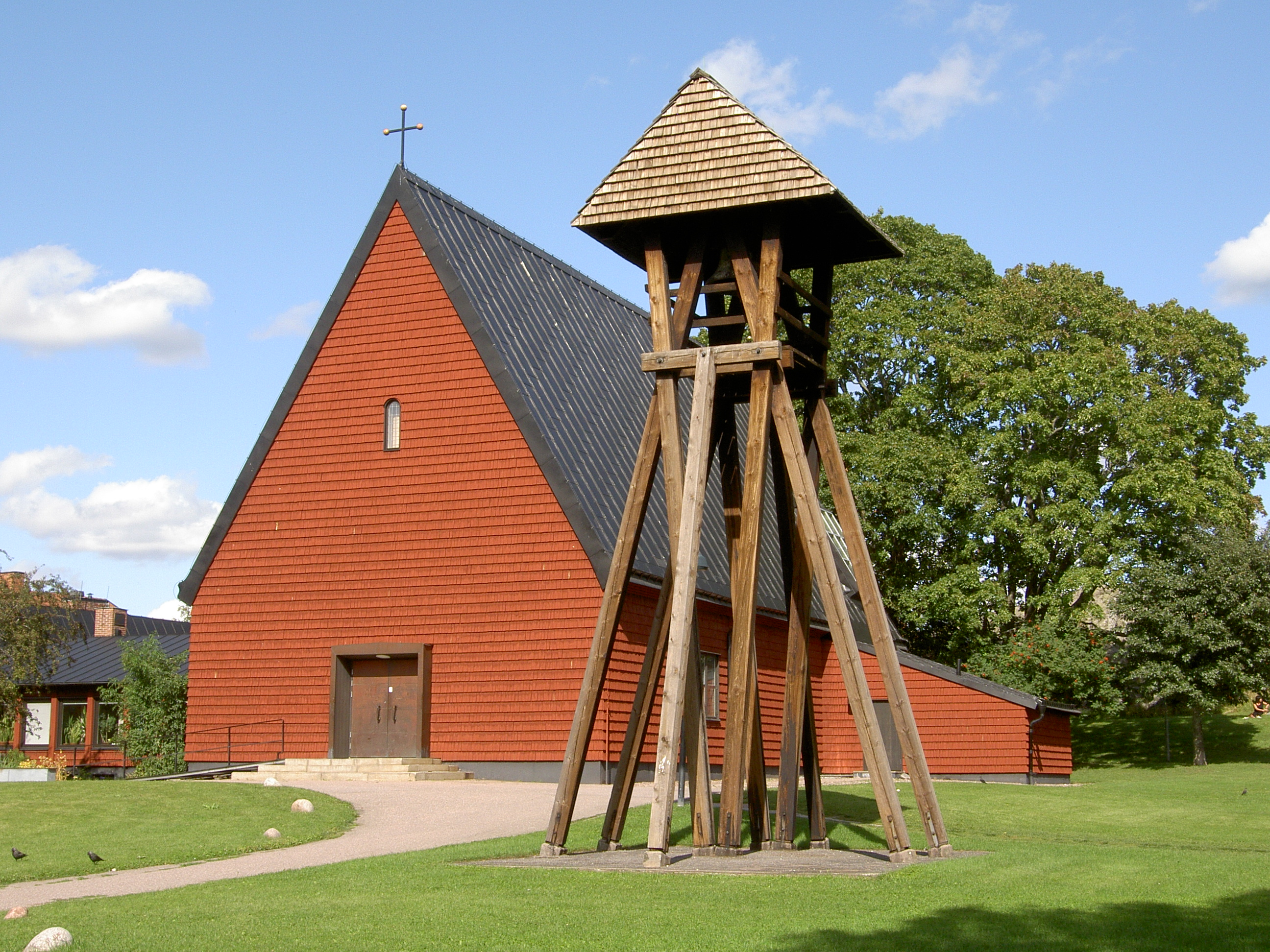
- Salabackekyrkan
- Interactive map of Sala Backe, Uppsala
- Country: Sweden
- County: Uppsala County
- Municipality: Uppsala Municipality

Area
  - Total: 1.38 km^{2} (0.53 sq mi)

Population (2021)
  - Total: 11,759
  - Density: 8,520/km^{2} (22,100/sq mi)
- Time zone: UTC+1 (CET)
  - Summer (DST): UTC+2 (CEST)

Sala backe is a district in Uppsala, Sweden. In 2021 it had a population of 11,759. The area, which was developed after World War II, mainly consists of three to five story apartment blocks with some single family houses to the south, in an area known as Johannesbäck.
