= Salabacke Church =

Church in Uppsala, Sweden

Coordinates: 59°52′7.9″N 17°40′5.45″E

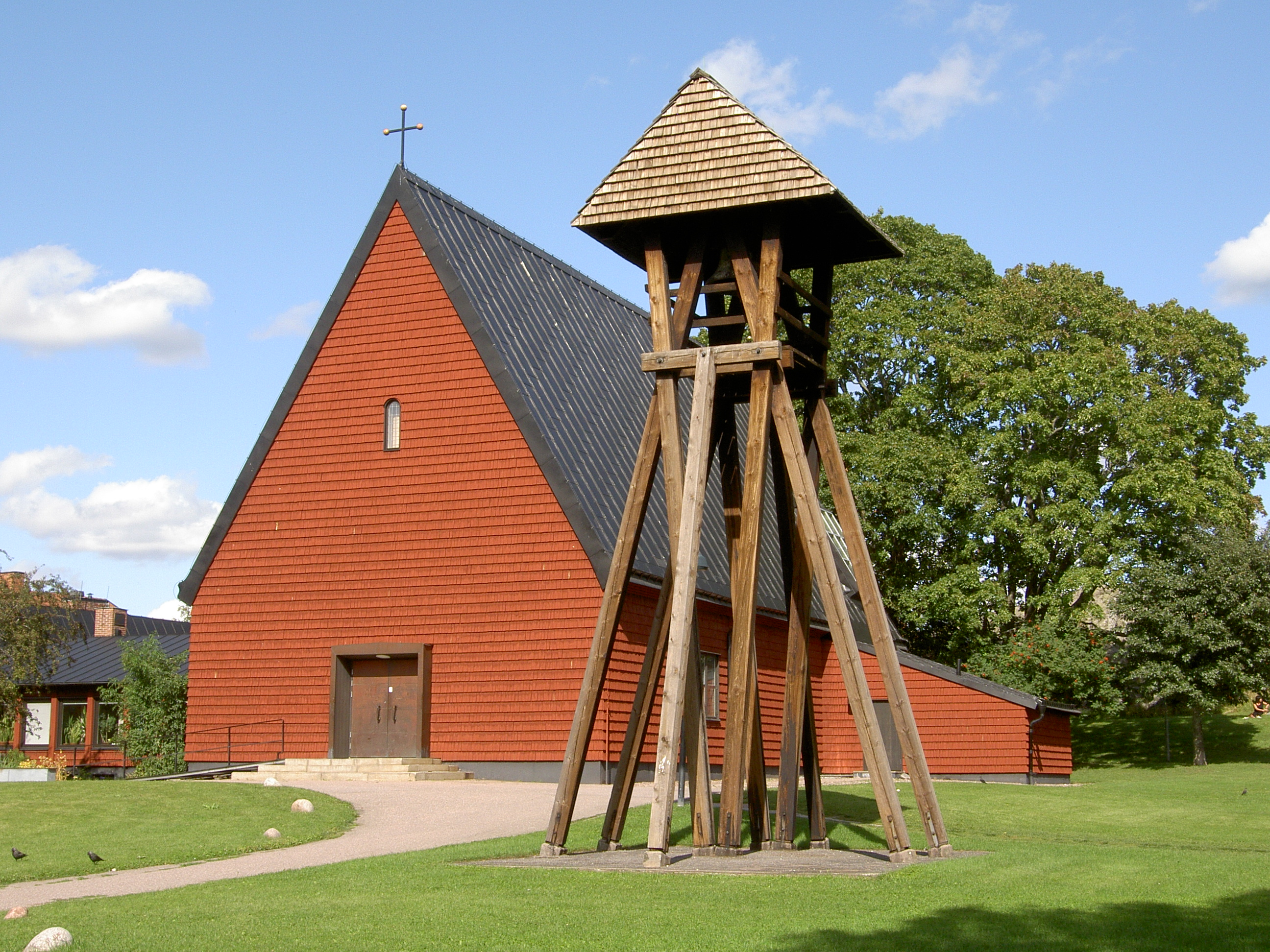
- Salabacke Church with clock tower

Religion
- Affiliation: Church of Sweden
- Province: Vaksala parish, Archdiocese of Uppsala
- Region: Uppsala County
- Status: Active

Location
- Location: Sala backe, Uppsala, Sweden
- State: Sweden
- Interactive map of Salabacke Church

Architecture
- Architects: Sten Hummel-Gumaelius and Jean Michon Bordes
- Type: Church
- Style: Wooden
- General contractor: Anders Diös
- Completed: 1958

Website
- svenskakyrkan.se/uppsala/salabackekyrkan

Salabacke Church (Swedish: Salabackekyrkan) is a church in the city district of Sala backe in Uppsala, Sweden that was opened in 1958. The church was designed by Sten Hummel-Gumaelius and is made of wood. It suffered an arson attack in 1993 but was later rebuilt with a nearly identical design.

== History ==
When the population in the newly established Sala backe area in Uppsala grew in the early 1950s, the need for a small church became apparent. A design was proposed by architect Sten Hummel-Gumaelius – cooperating with Jean Michon Bordes, which was subsequently approved. The construction of the church was headed by the firm Anders Diös, and it was opened on 14 December 1958.

The church was formerly part of the Uppsala Cathedral parish, but was transferred to the Vaksala parish when the parish divisions were amended in 1963.

An arson attack destroyed the main church building in July 1993, but the parish buildings survived the fire. It was rebuilt with mostly the same design after the fire, though minor changes were made. A skylight was slightly expanded along with the sacristy near the southern wall of the chancel.

== Architecture ==
The building contains low rows of parish buildings combined with the nave which is characterized by its height and space, with a steep pitched roof and clean wooden surfaces. The floor-to-ceiling rafters of laminated timber contribute to the nave's individuality. The nave has been likened to a ship with the keel upwards.

== Inventory ==
The altarpiece that was installed on 27 October 1963 depicts Jesus' entry into Jerusalem and was painted by Bror Hjorth. It was the only valuable item that could be saved from the 1993 fire, due to the firefighters concentrating their efforts on the chancel wall.

Three pieces of textile art were donated to the church for its 25-year anniversary. They were made by Bärbel Neumann and decorate the church walls.

The organ, built by Grönlunds Orgelbyggeri, was installed in 1997. The organ architect Kerstin Fernert based the colors on Bror Hjorth's altarpiece.

== Gallery ==
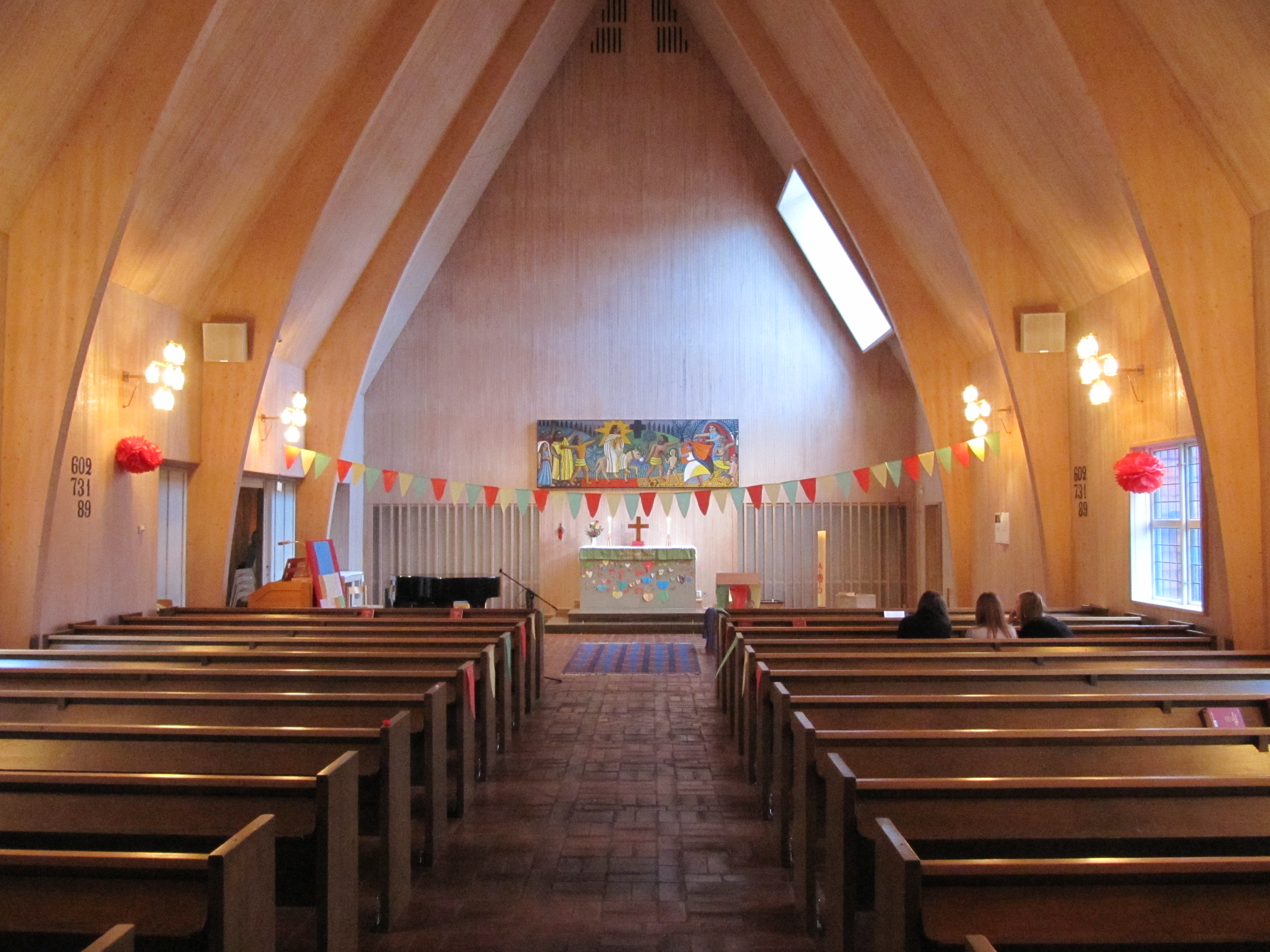
Interior view towards altarpiece

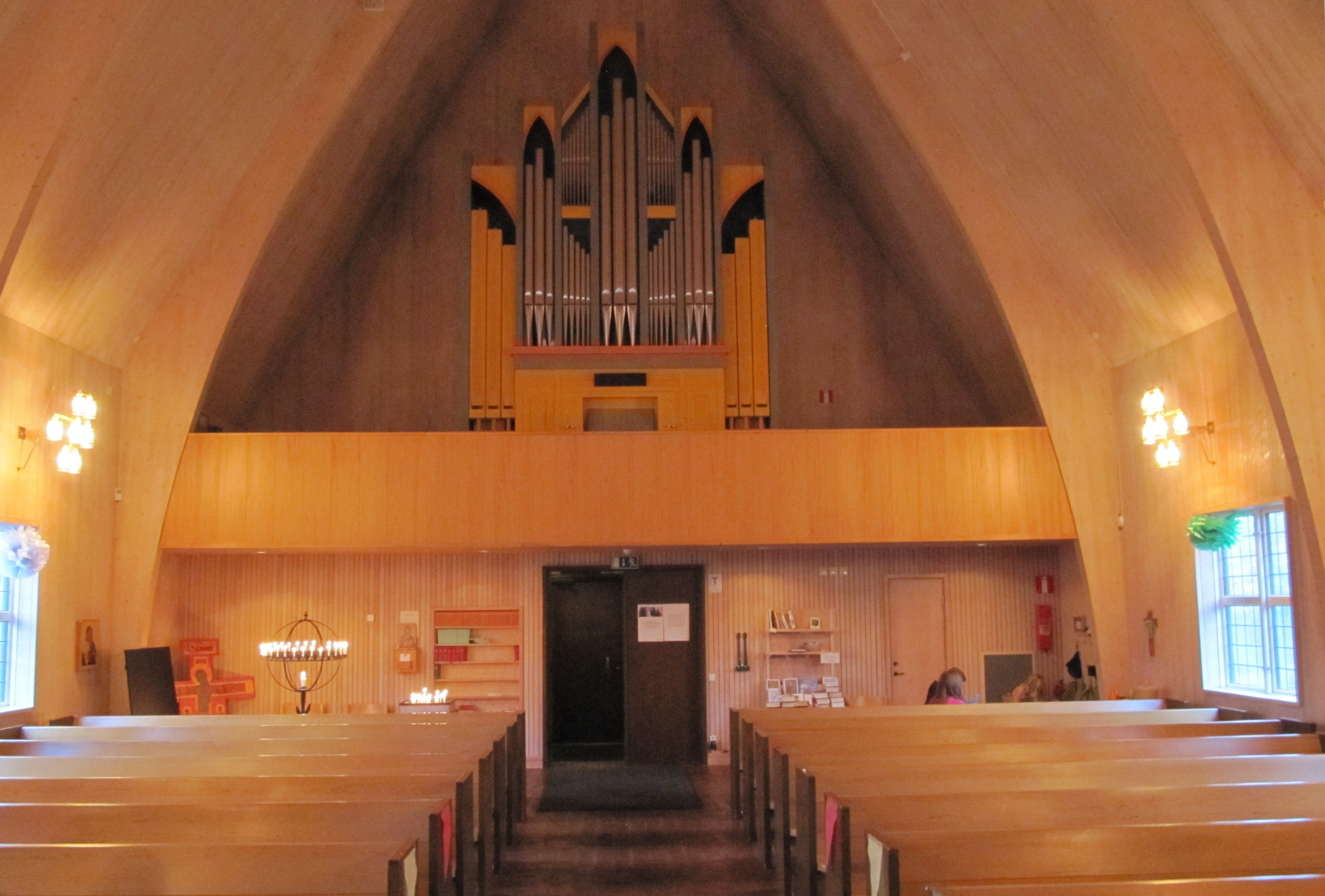
Interior view towards organ
