= Älvkarleby =

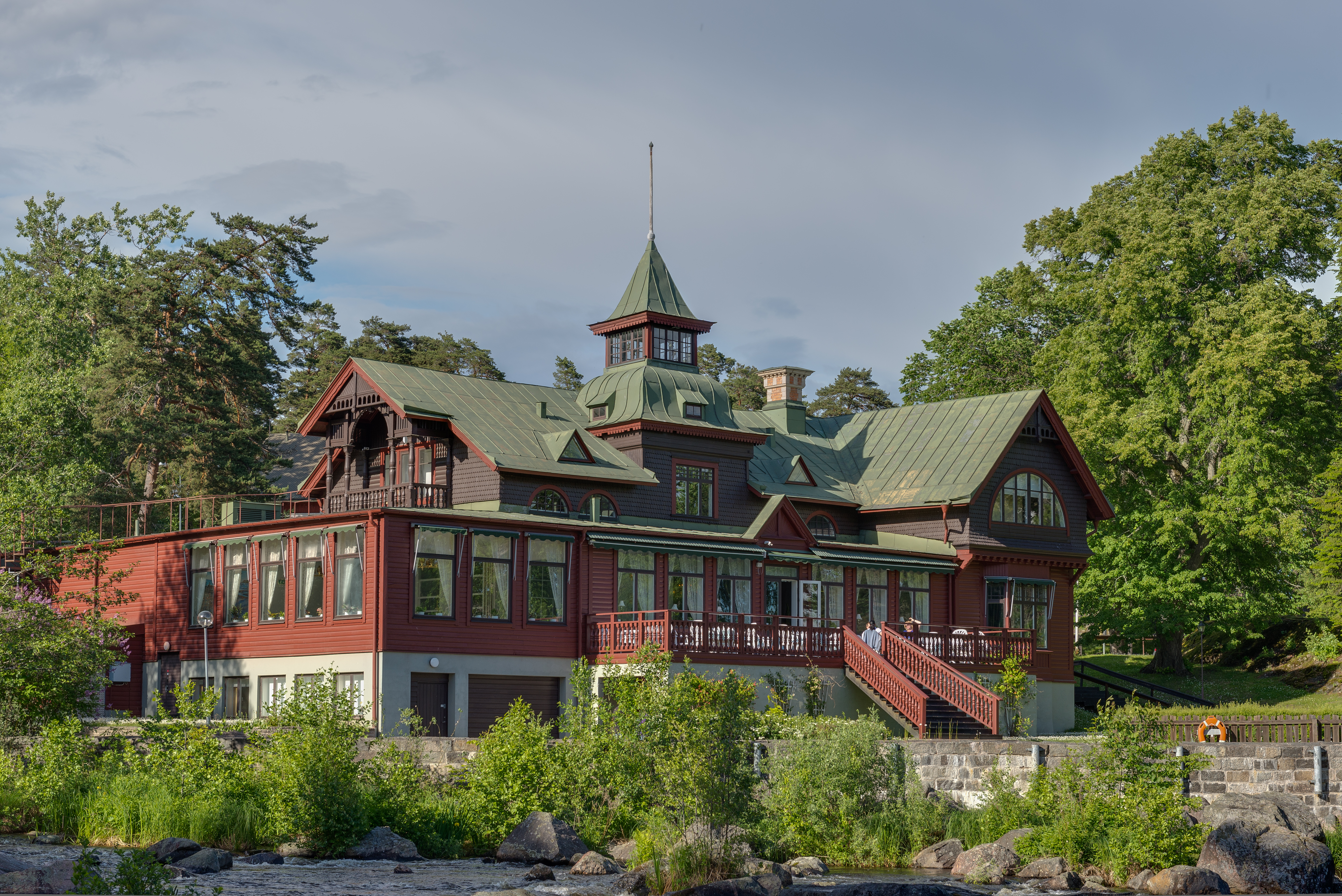
- Älvkarleby Hotel in June 2013

- Location within Uppsala Location within Sweden
- Coordinates: 60°34′N 17°27′E
- Country: Sweden
- Province: Uppland
- County: Uppsala County
- Municipality: Älvkarleby Municipality

Area
  - Total: 2.70 km^{2} (1.04 sq mi)

Population (31 December 2020)
  - Total: 1,490
  - Density: 552/km^{2} (1,430/sq mi)
- Time zone: UTC+1 (CET)
  - Summer (DST): UTC+2 (CEST)
- Climate: Dfb

Älvkarleby (Swedish pronunciation: [ɛlvˈkɑ̂ːɭɛˌbyː]) is a locality situated in Älvkarleby Municipality, Uppsala County, Sweden with 1,647 inhabitants in 2010. It is not the seat of the municipality, a function held by Skutskär 7 km to the north.

== People from Älvkarleby ==
One of Sweden's most famous authors, Stig Dagerman was born in Älvkarleby on 5 October 1923 and spent his youth there. At the centenary of his birth in 2023, a park in Älvkarleby was named after Stig Dagerman and a statue was placed there.

Finnish ice hockey player Jesse Puljujärvi, currently playing for the Genève-Servette HC, was also born in Älvkarleby.

== See also ==
- Älgen Stolta
