= Bror Hjorths Hus =

Coordinates: 59°50′58″N 17°37′13″E

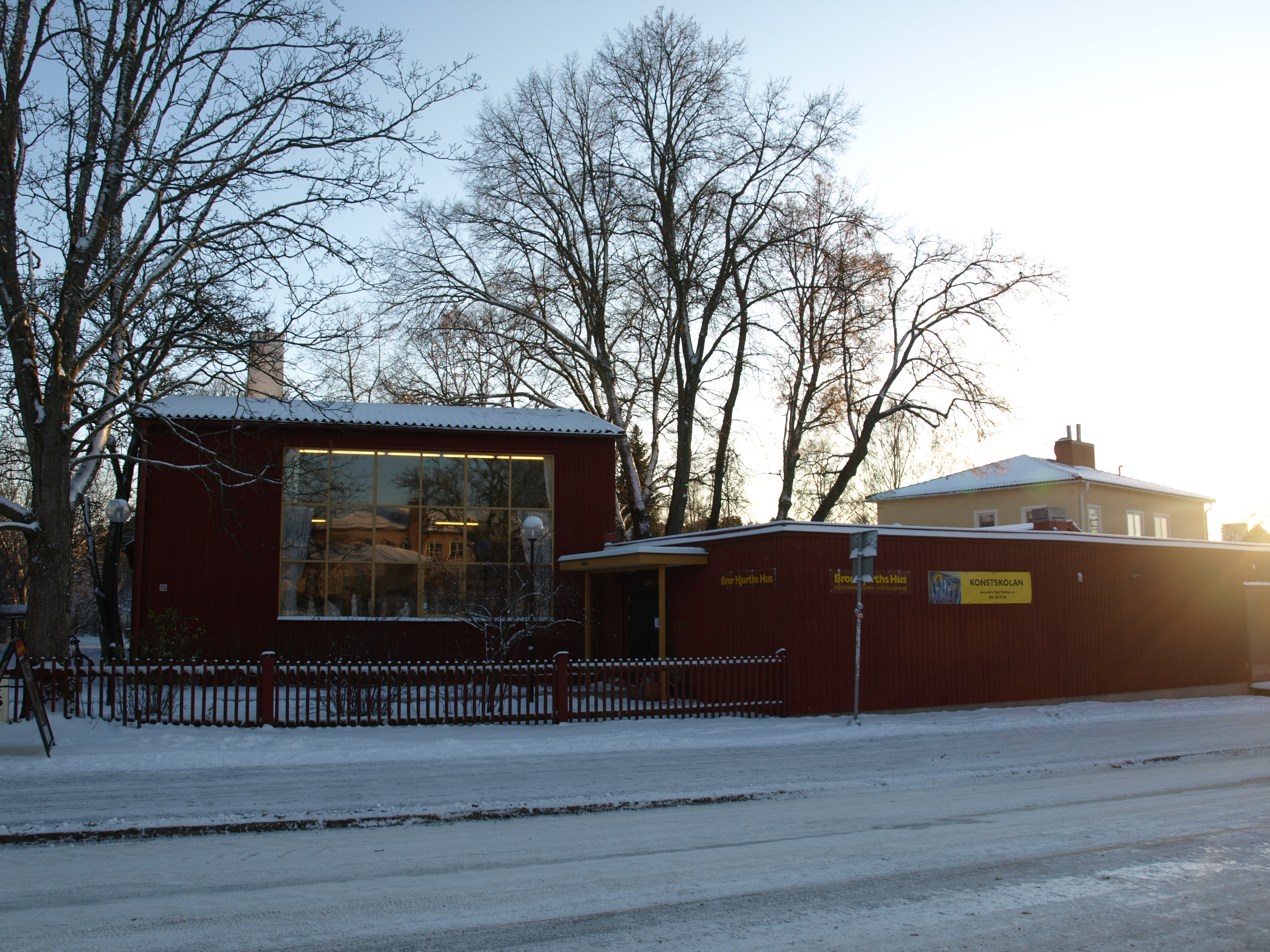
Bror Hjorths hus, seen from the outside.

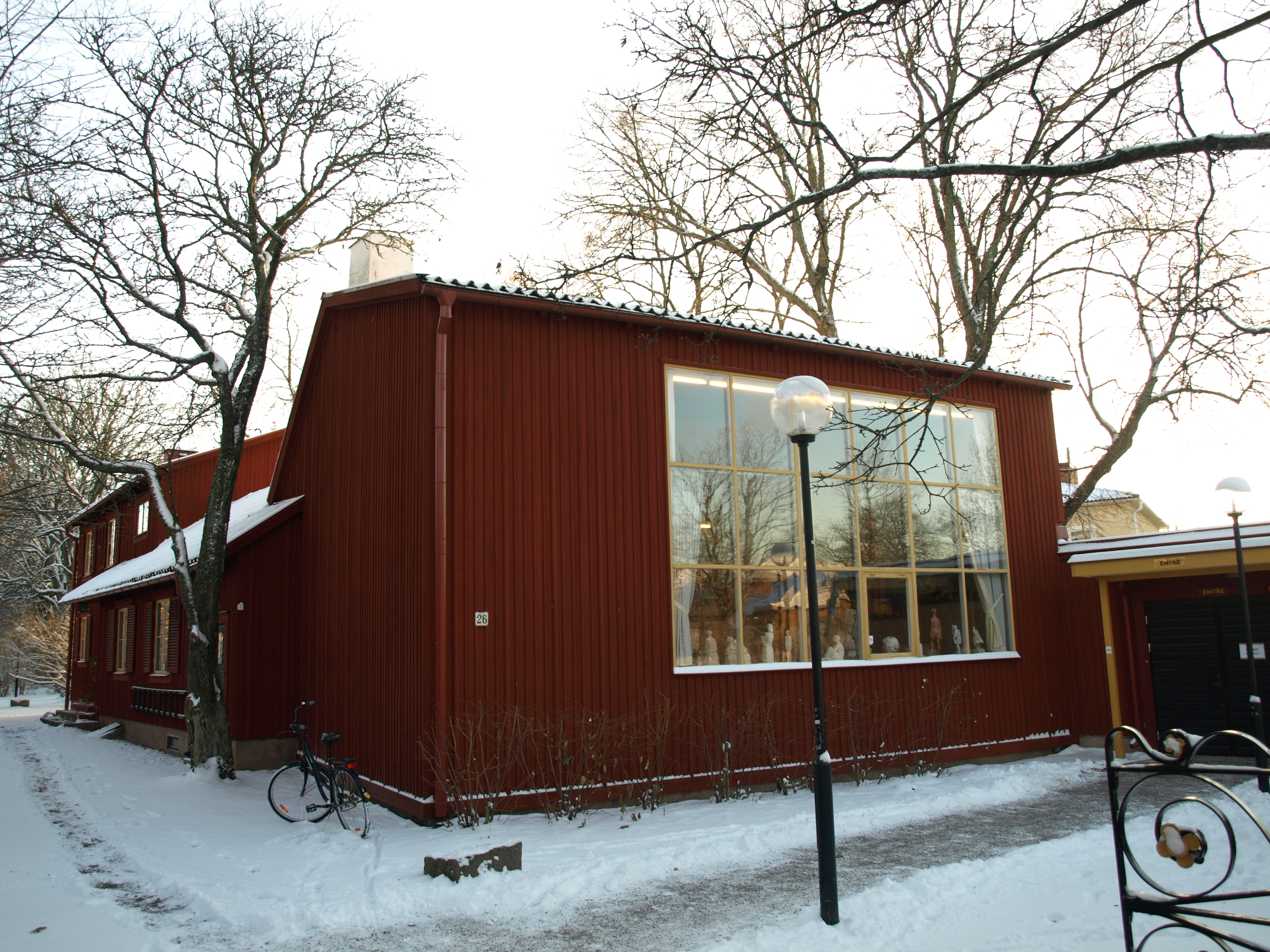
Bror Hjorths hus, November 2008.

Bror Hjorths Hus is a museum located in Uppsala, Sweden. The museum is housed in the former studio of sculptor and painter Bror Hjorth (1894–1968).

Hjorth's villa was designed by architect Sten Hummel-Gumaelius (1906-1986). The building was built in 1943 and was for 25 years both the home and studio of Bror Hjorth.

The museum has a large collection of Hjorth's work. The former residence and studio are filled with paintings, sculptures, reliefs and drawings as well as preliminary works and sketches for the artist's many public assignments. The museum opened in 1978. In the mid-1990s, the museum was expanded with an exhibition hall designed by architect Bengt Löfberg.

== See also ==
- List of single-artist museums
