= Skutskärs IF Fotboll =

Swedish football club

Skutskärs IF FK
- Full name: Skutskärs Idrottsförening Fotbollklubb
- Ground: Skutskärs IP; Skutskär; Sweden
- Chairman: Kent Hockman
- League: Division 4 Gestrikland
Home colours

Skutskärs IF FK is a Swedish football club located in Skutskär.

== Background ==
Skutskärs IF FK currently plays in Division 4 Gestrikland which is the sixth tier of Swedish football. They play their home matches at the Skutskärs IP in Skutskär.

The club is affiliated to Gestriklands Fotbollförbund. Skutskärs IF have competed in the Svenska Cupen on 13 occasions and have played 19 matches in the competition.

== Season to season ==
In their most successful period Skutskärs IF competed in the following divisions:

Season	Level	Division	Section	Position	Movements
1924–25	Tier 2	Division 2	Uppsvenska	5th	
1925–26	Tier 2	Division 2	Uppsvenska	4th	
1926–27	Tier 2	Division 2	Uppsvenska	7th	
1927–28	Tier 2	Division 2	Uppsvenska	9th	Relegated
1928–29	Tier 3	Division 3	Uppsvenska	7th	
1929–30	Tier 3	Division 3	Uppsvenska	2nd	
1930–31	Tier 3	Division 3	Uppsvenska	2nd	
1931–32	Tier 3	Division 3	Uppsvenska	6th	
1932–33	Tier 3	Division 3	Uppsvenska	8th	
1933–34	Tier 3	Division 3	Uppsvenska	3rd	
1934–35	Tier 3	Division 3	Uppsvenska Östra	6th	
1935–36	Tier 3	Division 3	Uppsvenska Västra	5th	
1936–37	Tier 3	Division 3	Uppsvenska Östra	1st	Promotion Playoffs – Promoted
1937–38	Tier 2	Division 2	Norra	10th	Relegated
1938–39	Tier 3	Division 3	Uppsvenska Västra	7th	
1939–40	Tier 3	Division 3	Uppsvenska Västra	4th	
1940–41	Tier 3	Division 3	Östsvenska Norra	4th	
1941–42	Tier 3	Division 3	Östsvenska Norra	3rd	
1942–43	Tier 3	Division 3	Östsvenska Norra	4th	
1943–44	Tier 3	Division 3	Östsvenska Norra	4th	
1944–45	Tier 3	Division 3	Östsvenska Norra	4th	
1945–46	Tier 3	Division 3	Östsvenska Norra	2nd	
1946–47	Tier 3	Division 3	Uppsvenska Östra	3rd	Relegated

In recent seasons Skutskärs IF FK have competed in the following divisions:

Season	Level	Division	Section	Position	Movements
2005	Tier 5	Division 4	Gästrikland	4th	
2006*	Tier 6	Division 4	Gästrikland	2nd	Promotion Playoffs
2007	Tier 6	Division 4	Gästrikland	4th	
2008	Tier 6	Division 4	Gästrikland	3rd	
2009	Tier 6	Division 4	Gästrikland	2nd	
2010	Tier 6	Division 4	Gästrikland	2nd	Promotion Playoffs
2011	Tier 6	Division 4	Gästrikland	4th	

* League restructuring in 2006 resulted in a new division being created at Tier 3 and subsequent divisions dropping a level.
