= Björklinge =

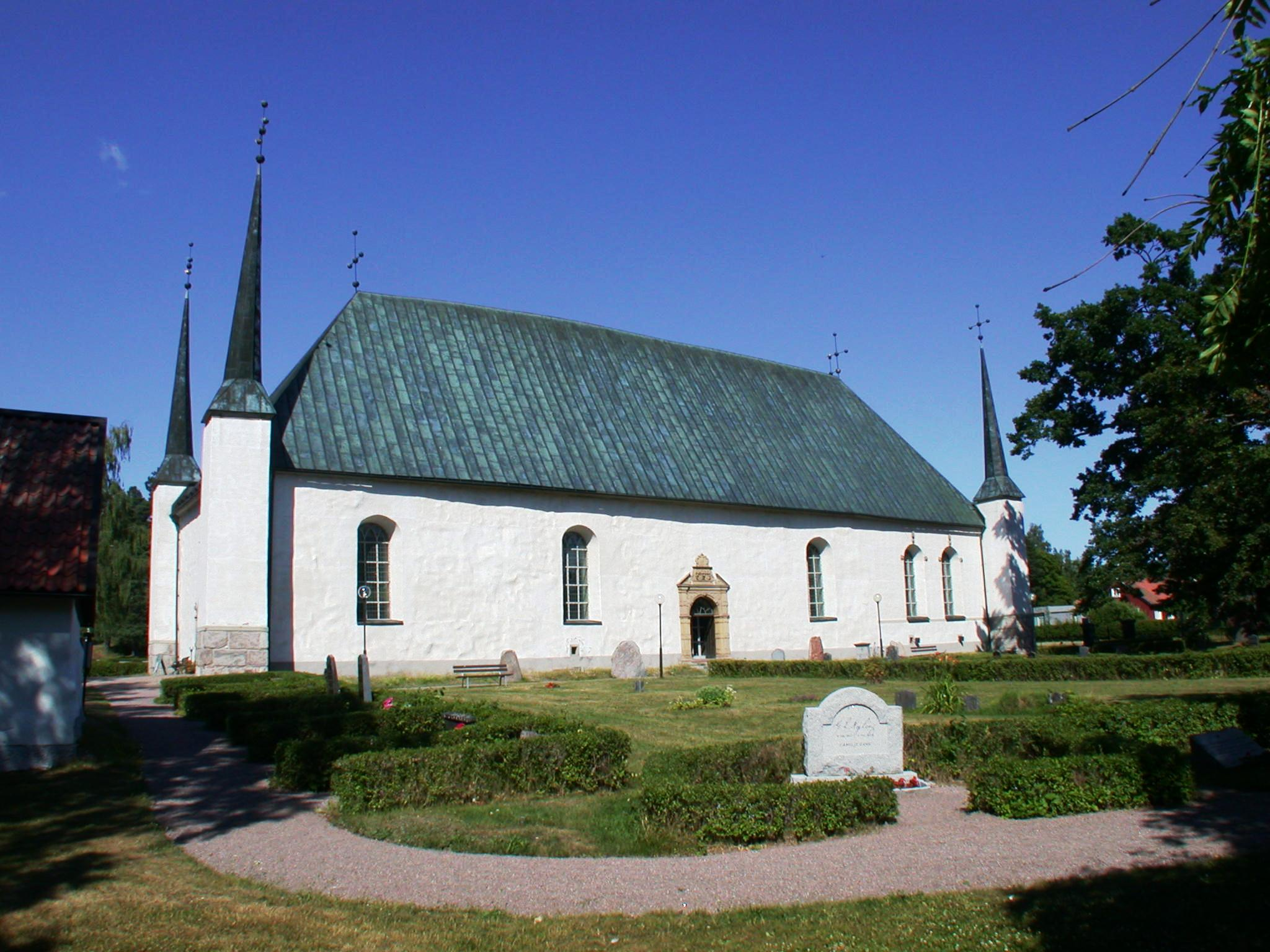
- Björklinge church

- Location within Uppsala Location within Sweden
- Coordinates: 60°02′N 17°33′E
- Country: Sweden
- Province: Uppland
- County: Uppsala County
- Municipality: Uppsala Municipality

Area
  - Total: 2.70 km^{2} (1.04 sq mi)

Population (31 December 2020)
  - Total: 3,336
  - Density: 1,240/km^{2} (3,200/sq mi)
- Time zone: UTC+1 (CET)
  - Summer (DST): UTC+2 (CEST)

Björklinge is a locality situated in Uppsala Municipality, Uppsala County, Sweden with 3,269 inhabitants in 2010. The name, written as Birklinge, was used for the parish as early as 1314, and Norsemen graves have been found in the area.

Björklinge is situated on a glacial ridge next to lake Långsjön. European route E4 passed through the village until the new motorway east of Björklinge was opened for traffic on October 17, 2007.

Björklinge church, which was first built in the early 14th century and re-built in the 17th century, is in the centre of the village.

The spelman Anders Ljungqvist, called "Gås-Anders" (Anders of the geese), lived in Björklinge most of his life. There is a statue of him, created by the artist Bror Hjorth, standing next to the church. Bror Hjorth had a summer cottage by Långsjön.

== See also ==
- Björklinge runestones
