= Marma, Sweden =

Marma
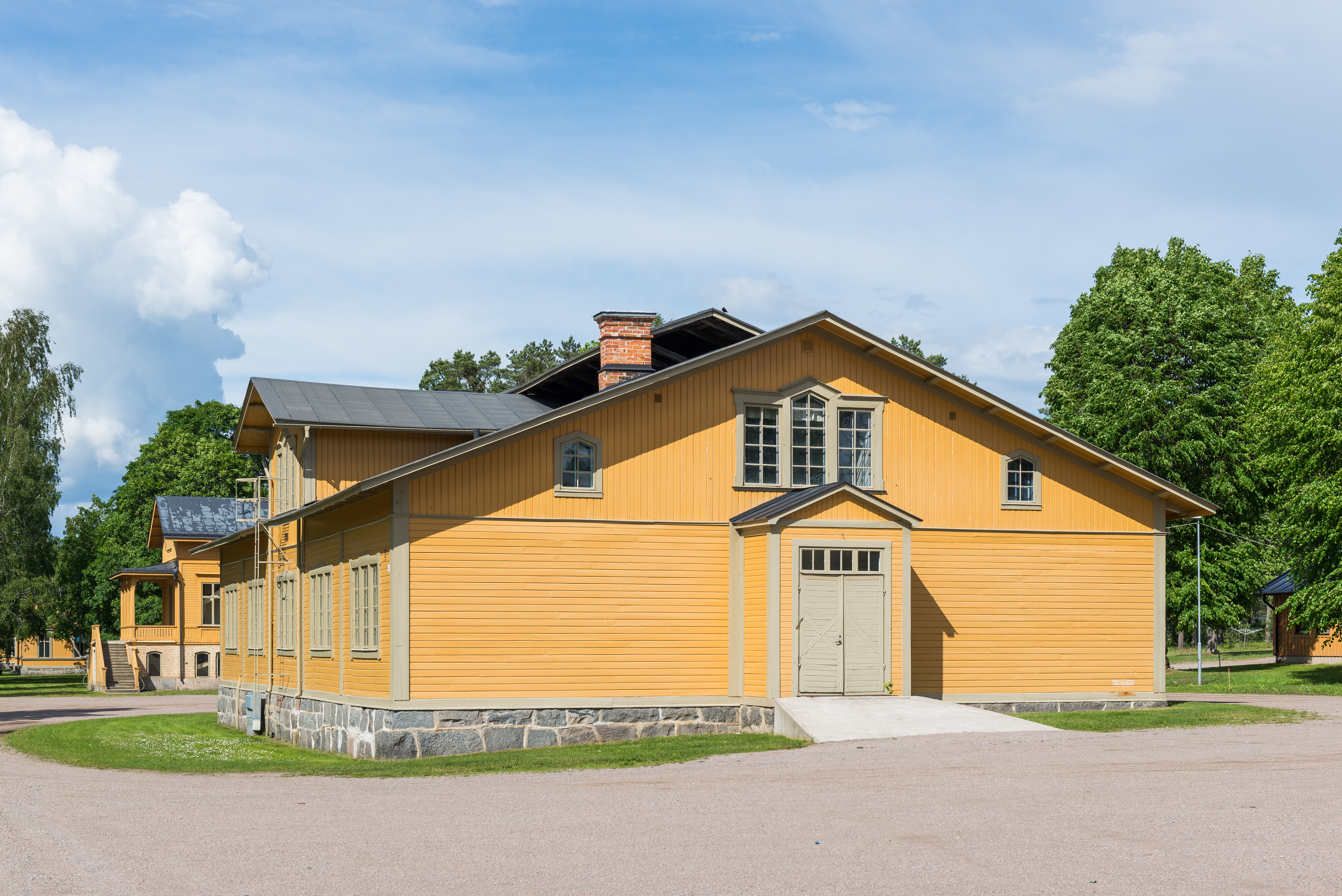
- Marma

- Location within Uppsala Location within Sweden
- Coordinates: 60°29′20″N 17°25′26″E
- Country: Sweden
- Province: Uppland
- County: Uppsala County
- Municipality: Älvkarleby Municipality

Area
  - Total: 0.68 km^{2} (0.26 sq mi)

Population (31 December 2010)
  - Total: 298
  - Density: 436/km^{2} (1,130/sq mi)
- Time zone: UTC+1 (CET)
  - Summer (DST): UTC+2 (CEST)

Marma is a locality situated in Älvkarleby Municipality, Uppsala County, Sweden with 298 inhabitants in 2010.
