= Skutskär =

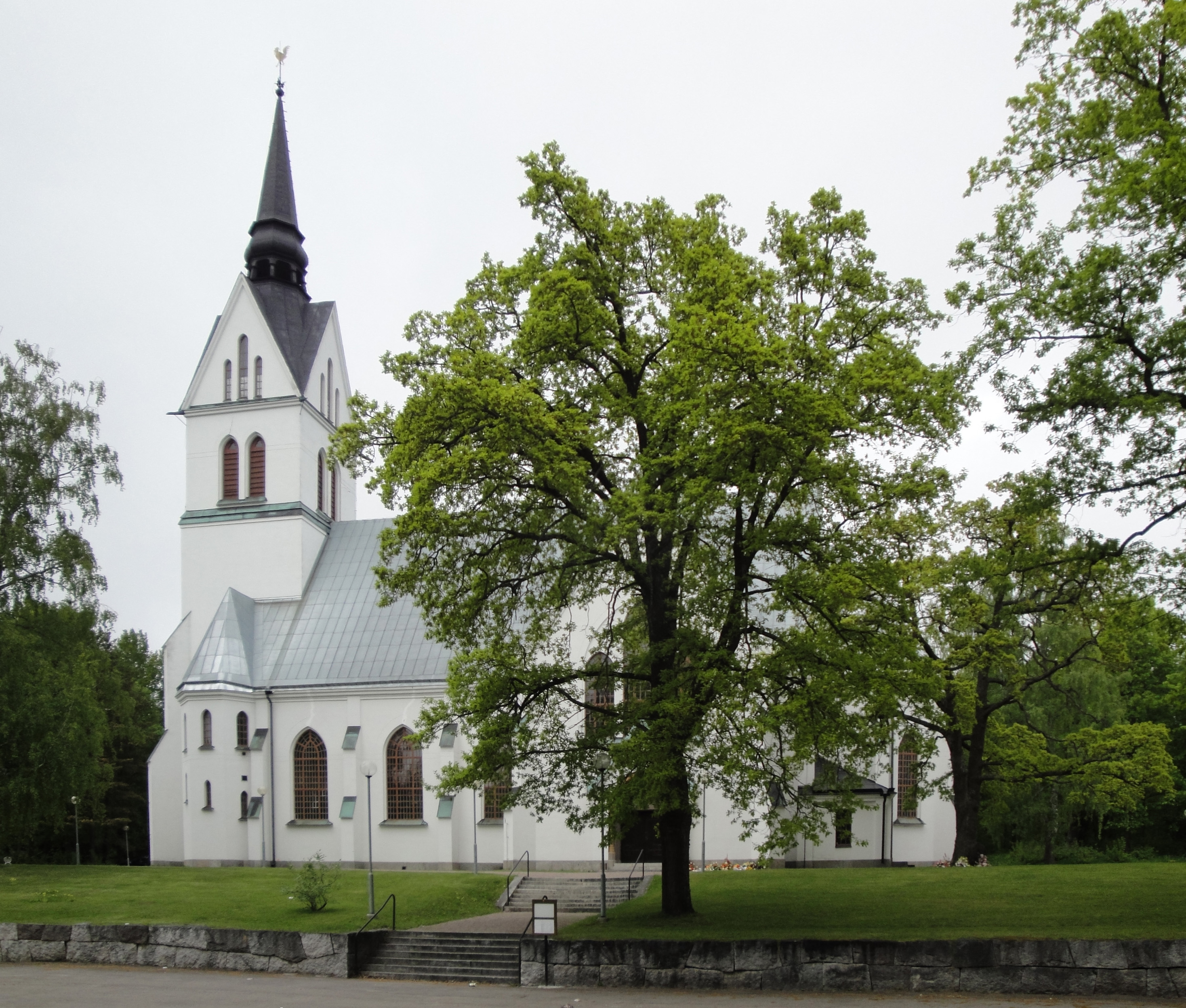
- Skutskär Church

- Location within Sweden Gävleborg Location within Uppsala Location within Sweden
- Coordinates: 60°38′N 17°25′E
- Country: Sweden
- Province: Uppland
- County: Uppsala County and Gävleborg County
- Municipality: Älvkarleby Municipality and Gävle Municipality

Area
  - Total: 7.35 km^{2} (2.84 sq mi)
- Elevation: 5 m (16 ft)

Population (31 December 2020)
  - Total: 6,499
  - Density: 884/km^{2} (2,290/sq mi)
- Time zone: UTC+1 (CET)
  - Summer (DST): UTC+2 (CEST)
- Postal code: 814 xx
- Area code: 026
- Website: www.skutskar.com

Skutskär (Swedish pronunciation: [ˈskɨᵝːtɧæːr]) is a bimunicipal locality and the seat of Älvkarleby Municipality in Uppsala County, Sweden with 6,075 inhabitants in 2010. According to the census of 2000 6,003 people lived in Skutskär, most of them in Älvkarleby Municipality, but a minor part in Gävle Municipality in Gävleborg County.

== History ==
Originally Skutskär was the area south and south-east from the industries located there. The first record of Skutskär (Ship Reef) is done 1741 and describes an anchoring point for the industries of Harnäs. The industries in question are iron smelting furnaces in Harnäs (shut down in the 1910s) and later the saw mill and wood pulp mill Skutskärsverken owned by Stora Enso which is still one of the largest in the world. This mill and its subcontractors remains by far the largest employer in Skutskär and the surrounding area. Skutskär back then had a large percentage of laborers and their families, which led to the building of all the facilities needed in a small town, including schools, shops, a fire brigade, ambulance and police. Even a public bath (shut down and demolished in the 1970s) and other facilities that must have been a luxury for the working class was built, often with support from the pulp mill.

The other half of what is now Skutskär is still called Upplandsbodarna or just Bodarna, especially by the older generations. It is located further south, along the Boda river, which is a small branch of the Dalälven river, before they both flow into the sea. The population consisted mainly of farmers and fishermen. This village was present a long time before the industries of Skutskär and associated to the Älvkarleby population. Skutskär and Bodarna was not physically the same town until the 1930s, when the new housing district of Kyrkbyn was built. By then the combination of the two urban areas was known simply as Skutskär.

Skutskär now remains a stable community population-wise due to the wood pulp mill, the saw mill (that is now run by other ventures after Stora shut down its saw mill operations in Skutskär), and the vicinity to Gävle but the municipality is struggling with its financial situation due to political decisions in the 1980s and 90s, mainly integration problems and failed building projects.

== Subdivision ==
Municipality	Population in Skutskär	Other urban areas	Other	Total	% of municipality population
Älvkarleby	5,681	2,300	951	8,932	63.30
Gävle	322	83,431	6,989	90,742	0.35
Total	6,003	85,731	7,940	99,674	6.02

== Sports ==
The following sports clubs are located in Skutskär:

- Skutskärs IF, bandy club, as of 2018 the Swedish champions among women
- Skutskärs IF FK, association football club
- Skutskärs OK - orienteering, orienteering club
