= 2018 Division 2 (Swedish football) =

Division 2
- Season: 2018

The 2018 Division 2, part of the 2018 Swedish football season is the 13th season of Sweden's fourth-tier football league in its current format.

== Teams ==
84 teams contest the league divided into six sections - Norra Götaland, Norra Svealand, Norrland, Södra Svealand, Södra Svealand and Södra Svealand. The Division comprises 60 teams returning from the 2017 season, six relegated from Division 1 and 18 promoted from Division 3. The champion of each section will qualify directly for promotion to Division 1, the runner-up from each section enters a six-team, two-group playoff, with the winner of each group earning promotion to Division 1. The bottom two teams in each section are relegated to Division 3 with the 12th place team in each section entering a relegation playoff.

=== Stadia and locations ===
==== Norra Götaland ====
Team	Location	Stadium	Stadium capacity
FBK Karlstad	Karlstad	Örsholmen IP	500
IK Gauthiod	Grästorp	Lunnevi IP	1,500
Hisingsbacka	Gothenburg	Backavallens Motionscentrum	3,000
Karlstad BK	Karlstad	Tingvalla IP	10,000
Nordvärmland FF	Ambjörby	Nyvallen	2,000
Skoftebyns IF	Trollhättan	Nysätra IP	1,000
Stenungsunds IF	Stenungsund	Nösnäsvallen	3,000
Torslanda IK	Torslanda	Torslandavallen	1,500
FC Trollhättan	Trollhättan	Edsborgs IP	5,100
IFK Uddevalla	Uddevalla	Kamratgården	2,500
Vänersborgs FK	Vänersborg	Vänersvallen Nord	1,500
Vänersborgs IF	Vänersborg	Vänersborgs Idrottsförening	1,500
Vårgårda	Vårgårda	Tånga Hed	1,000
Örebro Syrianska IF	Örebro	Trängens IP	4,700

==== Norra Svealand ====
Team	Location	Stadium	Stadium capacity
Bollnäs GIF FF	Bollnäs	Sävstaås IP	3,000
Gamla Upsala SK	Uppsala	Lötens IP	1,000
FC Gute	Visby	Gutavallen	5,000
Karlbergs BK	Stockholm	Stadshagens IP	2,000
IFK Lidingö FK	Lidingö	Lidingövallen	1,000
IFK Mora FK	Mora	Prästholmens IP	1,000
BKV Norrtälje	Norrtälje	Norrtälje Sportcentrum	1,000
Skiljebo SK	Västerås	Hamre IP	1,500
IFK Stocksund	Stocksund	Danderyd Arena	1,000
Strömsbergs IF	Tierp	Strömbergs IP	1,000
Sundbybergs IK	Sundbyberg	Sundbybergs IP	1,000
Täby FK	Täby	Tibblevallen	1,000
Valbo FF	Valbo	Åbyvallen	1,000
Vasalunds IF	Stockholm	Skytteholms IP	4,000

==== Norrland ====
Team	Location	Stadium	Stadium capacity
Bodens BK	Boden	Boden Arena	5,300
Friska Viljor FC	Örnsköldsvik	Skyttis IP	3,000
Gottne IF	Mellansel	Haraldsängen Fotbollsplan 1	1,000
Gällivare Malmbergets FF	Gällivare	Malmbergets IP	1,000
Hudiksvalls FF	Hudiksvall	Glysisvallen	3,000
Härnösands FF	Härnösand	Högslättens IP	5,000
IFK Luleå	Luleå	Skogsvallen	5,000
IFK Timrå	Timrå	Timrå IP	1,000
IFK Umeå	Umeå	Vildmannavallen IP	1,000
IFK Östersund	Östersund	Jämtkraft Arena	8,466
Kramfors-Alliansen	Kramfors	Kramfors IP	1,500
Piteå IF	Piteå	LF Arena	3,950
Täfteå IK	Täfteå	Täfteborg	1,000
Ytterhogdals IK	Ytterhogdal	Svedjevallen	1,000

==== Södra Svealand ====
Team	Location	Stadium	Stadium capacity
AFK Linköping	Linköping	Arena Linköping	7,500
IFK Aspudden-Tellus	Stockholm	Aspuddens IP	1,500
Enskede IK	Gamla Enskede	Enskede IP	1,000
Eskilstuna City FK	Eskilstuna	Tunavallen	7,800
IFK Haninge	Haninge	Torvalla IP	1,000
Huddinge IF	Huddinge	Källbrinks IP	2,500
Motala AIF	Motala	Motala Idrottspark	8,500
Newroz FC	Skärholmen	Sätra Idrottsplats	1,000
Nora BK	Nora	Norvalla	1,000
IK Sleipner	Norrköping	Östgötaporten	17,234
IF Sylvia	Norrköping	Östgötaporten	17,234
Södertälje FK	Södertälje	Södertälje Fotbollsarena	6,400
Värmbols FC	Katrineholm	Backavallen	4,000
Värmdö IF	Värmdö	Värmdövallen	2,000

==== Västra Götaland ====
Team	Location	Stadium	Stadium capacity
Assyriska BK	Västra Frölunda	Ruddalens IP	5,600
IS Halmia	Halmstad	Örjans vall	16,000
Hittarps IK	Helsingborg	Laröds IP	1,000
Högaborgs BK	Helsingborg	Harlyckans IP	2,000
IFK Malmö	Malmö	Malmö Stadion	14,000
Kvarnby IK	Malmö	Bäckagårds IP	1,000
Lindome GIF	Lindome	Lindevi IP	1,500
BK Olympic	Malmö	Lindängens IP	2,000
KSF Prespa Birlik	Malmö	Heleneholms IP	3,500
FC Rosengård 1917	Malmö	Rosengårds Södra IP	5,000
Sävedalens IF	Sävedalen	Vallhamra IP	2,500
Ullareds IK	Ullared	Hedevi IP	1,000
Vinbergs IF	Vinberg	Vinåvallen	1,000

==== Östra Götaland ====
Team	Location	Stadium	Stadium capacity
Asarums IF	Asarum	Asarums IP	2,500
Assyriska IK	Jönköping	Rosenlunds IP	1,500
IFK Berga	Kalmar	Bergaviks IP	1,000
IFÖ Bromölla IF	Bromölla	Strandängens IP A-plan	1,000
Dalstorps IF	Dalstorp	Dalshov	2,000
IFK Hässleholm	Hässleholm	Österås IP	5,500
Lindsdals IF	Kalmar	Fjölebro IP	1,000
Nosaby IF	Kristianstad	Nya Vallbjörka	1,000
Nässjö FF	Nässjö	Skogsvallen	2,000
Räppe GoIF	Växjö	Räppevallen	1,000
Råslätts SK	Jönköping	Råslätts IP	3,000
Sölvesborgs GoIF	Sölvesborg	Svarta Led	2,500
Österlen FF	Skillinge	Skillinge	1,000
