= 2010 Division 2 (Swedish football) =

Swedish League Division 2
- Season: 2010
- Champions: IFK Luleå; IK Frej; Akropolis IF; Motala AIF; IK Oddevold; Varbergs BoIS
- Promoted: 6 teams above and Karlstad BK
- Relegated: 12 teams

Statistics of Swedish football Division 2 for the 2010 season.

== League standings ==
=== Norrland 2010 ===
Pos	Team	Pld	W	D	L	GF	GA	GD	Pts	Promotion or relegation
1	IFK Luleå	22	13	6	3	48	25	+23	45	Promotion to Division 1
2	Skellefteå FF	22	13	5	4	44	23	+21	44	
3	Piteå IF	22	11	4	7	29	26	+3	37	
4	Sollefteå GIF	22	9	9	4	38	27	+11	36	
5	Anundsjö IF	22	8	6	8	32	32	0	30	
6	IF Älgarna	22	7	8	7	29	25	+4	29	
7	Umedalens IF	22	8	5	9	31	33	−2	29	
8	Ersboda SK	22	7	7	8	33	29	+4	28	
9	IFK Härnösand	22	7	5	10	28	43	−15	26	
10	Mariehem SK	22	5	8	9	29	41	−12	23	Relegation playoffs to Division 3
11	Robertsfors IK	22	5	7	10	27	39	−12	22	Relegation to Division 3
12	Tegs SK	22	3	2	17	22	47	−25	11	Relegation to Division 3

=== Norra Svealand 2010 ===
Pos	Team	Pld	W	D	L	GF	GA	GD	Pts	Promotion or relegation
1	IK Frej	22	14	5	3	39	16	+23	47	Promotion to Division 1
2	Sollentuna United FF	22	12	4	6	47	35	+12	40	
3	Strömsbergs IF	22	11	5	6	38	28	+10	38	
4	Rotebro IS	22	9	5	8	41	40	+1	32	
5	Sandvikens IF	22	9	5	8	30	34	−4	32	
6	Gamla Upsala SK	22	9	4	9	38	31	+7	31	
7	Skiljebo SK	22	9	3	10	26	26	0	30	
8	Hudiksvalls ABK	22	8	4	10	27	30	−3	28	
9	Enköpings SK	22	8	4	10	20	24	−4	28	
10	Västerås IK	22	7	6	9	30	25	+5	27	Relegation playoffs to Division 3
11	Köping FF	22	6	8	8	35	42	−7	26	Relegation to Division 3
12	IFK Sundsvall	22	3	2	17	20	60	−40	11	Relegation to Division 3

=== Södra Svealand 2010 ===
Pos	Team	Pld	W	D	L	GF	GA	GD	Pts	Promotion or relegation
1	Akropolis IF	22	14	4	4	47	34	+13	46	Promotion to Division 1
2	Enskede IK	22	10	9	3	46	32	+14	39	
3	Nyköpings BIS	22	9	7	6	27	22	+5	34	
4	FoC Farsta	22	9	5	8	37	38	−1	32	
5	Värmdö IF	22	8	7	7	40	43	−3	31	
6	Värmbols FC	22	9	3	10	37	31	+6	30	
7	Örebro SK Ungdom	22	8	5	9	36	39	−3	29	
8	Smedby AIS	22	8	5	9	33	38	−5	29	
9	Eskilstuna City	22	8	4	10	37	38	−1	28	
10	FC Gute	22	8	4	10	25	34	−9	28	Relegation playoffs to Division 3
11	Karlslunds IF	22	8	3	11	42	33	+9	27	Relegation to Division 3
12	Vallentuna BK	22	3	4	15	18	43	−25	13	Relegation to Division 3

=== Östra Götaland 2010 ===
Pos	Team	Pld	W	D	L	GF	GA	GD	Pts	Promotion or relegation
1	Motala AIF	22	15	4	3	52	24	+28	49	Promotion to Division 1
2	BK Kenty	22	12	4	6	35	26	+9	40	
3	Karlskrona AIF	22	11	4	7	33	27	+6	37	
4	IK Tord	22	10	6	6	45	33	+12	36	
5	Lindsdals IF	22	10	5	7	46	37	+9	35	
6	Vimmerby IF	22	9	6	7	48	38	+10	33	
7	VMA IK	22	9	2	11	49	53	−4	29	
8	Tenhults IF	22	7	4	11	35	46	−11	25	
9	Ljungby IF	22	7	2	13	28	43	−15	23	
10	IFK Hässleholm	22	6	5	11	27	42	−15	23	Relegation playoffs to Division 3
11	FK Linköping	22	5	7	10	27	37	−10	22	Relegation to Division 3
12	Nybro IF	22	5	3	14	29	48	−19	18	Relegation to Division 3

=== Västra Götaland 2010 ===
Pos	Team	Pld	W	D	L	GF	GA	GD	Pts	Promotion or relegation
1	IK Oddevold	22	17	1	4	64	20	+44	52	Promotion to Division 1
2	Karlstad BK	22	16	3	3	56	30	+26	51	Promotion to Division 1
3	Gunnilse IS	22	16	2	4	66	28	+38	50	
4	Utsiktens BK	22	11	1	10	39	32	+7	34	
5	KB Karlskoga	22	9	6	7	35	37	−2	33	
6	Jonsereds IF	22	8	4	10	51	56	−5	28	
7	Götene IF	22	7	4	11	40	53	−13	25	
8	IK Gauthiod	22	7	4	11	37	51	−14	25	
9	Kinna IF	22	7	3	12	34	45	−11	24	
10	Annelunds IF	22	7	3	12	38	50	−12	24	Relegation playoffs to Division 3
11	Skärhamns IK	22	4	3	15	21	49	−28	15	Relegation to Division 3
12	Holmalunds IF	22	3	6	13	31	61	−30	15	Relegation to Division 3

=== Södra Götaland 2010 ===
Pos	Team	Pld	W	D	L	GF	GA	GD	Pts	Promotion or relegation
1	Varbergs BoIS	22	16	3	3	58	24	+34	51	Promotion to Division 1
2	IS Halmia	22	13	5	4	43	29	+14	44	
3	Lindome GIF	22	11	5	6	34	21	+13	38	
4	Kvarnby IK	22	11	4	7	36	29	+7	37	
5	IFK Klagshamn	22	10	2	10	44	38	+6	32	
6	Höllvikens GIF	22	9	5	8	41	38	+3	32	
7	Högaborgs BK	22	8	4	10	34	34	0	28	
8	Ramlösa Södra FF	22	8	3	11	33	36	−3	27	
9	Assyriska BK	22	8	3	11	28	34	−6	27	
10	GIF Nike	22	7	4	11	25	38	−13	25	Relegation playoffs to Division 3
11	Lilla Torg FF	22	5	7	10	25	45	−20	22	Relegation to Division 3
12	Fässbergs IF	22	3	1	18	21	56	−35	10	Relegation to Division 3

== Player of the year awards ==
Ever since 2003 the online bookmaker Unibet have given out awards at the end of the season to the best players in Division 2. The recipients are decided by a jury of sportsjournalists, coaches and football experts. The names highlighted in green won the overall national award.

Norrland
Position	Player	Club
GK	(Sweden) Kristoffer Block	Sollefteå GIF
DF	(Sweden) Tomas Taavo	IFK Luleå
MF	(North Macedonia) Goran Zdravkov	Skellefteå FF
FW	(Bosnia and Herzegovina) Dragan Kapčević	Sollefteå GIF

Norra Svealand
Position	Player	Club
GK	(Sweden) Modou Jawo	IK Frej
DF	(Sweden) Robert Medvegy	Skiljebo SK
MF	(Sweden) Mikael Erstadius	IK Frej
FW	(Sierra Leone) Teteh Bangura	Köping FF

Södra Svealand
Position	Player	Club
GK	(The Gambia) Bala Musa Bajaha	Nyköpings BIS
DF	(Sweden) Mohammad Ali	Akropolis IF
MF	(Sweden) Adnan Cirak	Eskilstuna City
FW	(Sweden) Niklas Norman	Värmbols FC

Östra Götaland
Position	Player	Club
GK	(Sweden) Rickard Göthberg	Motala AIF
DF	(Sierra Leone) Ibrahim Koroma	Motala AIF
MF	(Kosovo) Burim Rexhepi	IFK Hässleholm
FW	(Sweden) Andreas Grahm	VMA IK

Västra Götaland
Position	Player	Club
GK	(Sweden) Peter Zwetsloot	IK Oddevold
DF	(Sweden) Emil Mårtensson	Karlstad BK
MF	(Sweden) Viktor Olsson	Karlstad BK
FW	(Sierra Leone) Ibrahim Tahini	IK Oddevold

Södra Götaland
Position	Player	Club
GK	(Sweden) Jonas Käck	IS Halmia
DF	(Sweden) Fredrik Björk	Varbergs BoIS
MF	(Sweden) Daniel Ander	Högaborgs BK
FW	(Sweden) David Antonsson	Varbergs BoIS
