= 2012 in Swedish football =

Football in Sweden
- Season: 2012

Men's football
- Allsvenskan: IF Elfsborg
- Superettan: Östers IF
- Division 1: Östersunds FK (Norra); Örgryte IS (Sodra)
- Svenska Supercupen: Helsingborgs IF

The 2012 season in Swedish football, started in January 2012 and ended in December 2012.

== Honours ==
=== Official titles ===
| Title | Team | Reason |
|---|---|---|
| Swedish Champions 2012 | IF Elfsborg | Winners of Allsvenskan |
| Swedish Super Cup Champions 2012 | Helsingborgs IF | Winners of Svenska Supercupen |

=== Competitions ===
| Level | Competition | Team |
|---|---|---|
| 1st level | Allsvenskan 2012 | IF Elfsborg |
| 2nd level | Superettan 2012 | Östers IF |
| 3rd level | Division 1 Norra 2012 | Östersunds FK |
| 3rd level | Division 1 Södra 2012 | Örgryte IS |
| Super Cup | Supercupen 2012 | Helsingborgs IF |

== Promotions, relegations and qualifications ==
=== Promotions ===
| Promoted from | Promoted to | Team | Reason |
|---|---|---|---|
| Superettan 2012 | Allsvenskan 2013 | Östers IF | Winners |
| Superettan 2012 | Allsvenskan 2013 | IF Brommapojkarna | Runners-up |
| Superettan 2012 | Allsvenskan 2013 | Halmstads BK | Play-off winners |
| Division 1 Norra 2012 | Superettan 2013 | Östersunds FK | Winners |
| Division 1 Södra 2012 | Superettan 2013 | Örgryte IS | Winners |
| Division 2 2012 | Division 1 Norra 2013 | Selånger FK | Winners of group |
| Division 2 2012 | Division 1 Norra 2013 | Valsta Syrianska IK | Winners of group |
| Division 2 2012 | Division 1 Norra 2013 | Nyköpings BIS | Winners of group |
| Division 2 2012 | Division 1 Södra 2013 | Husqvarna FF | Winners of group |
| Division 2 2012 | Division 1 Södra 2013 | Torslanda IK | Winners of group |
| Division 2 2012 | Division 1 Södra 2013 | IS Halmia | Winners of group |

=== Relegations ===
| Relegated from | Relegated to | Team | Reason |
|---|---|---|---|
| Allsvenskan 2012 | Superettan 2013 | GIF Sundsvall | Play-off losers |
| Allsvenskan 2012 | Superettan 2013 | Örebro SK | 15th team |
| Allsvenskan 2012 | Superettan 2013 | GAIS | 16th team |
| Superettan 2012 | Division 1 Södra 2013 | Trelleborgs FF | 15th team |
| Superettan 2012 | Division 1 Norra 2013 | Umeå FC | 16th team |
| Division 1 Norra 2012 | Division 2 2013 | Syrianska IF Kerburan | 12th team |
| Division 1 Norra 2012 | Division 2 2013 | Akropolis IF | 13th team |
| Division 1 Norra 2012 | Division 2 2013 | Enköpings SK | 14th team |
| Division 1 Södra 2012 | Division 2 2013 | IK Sleipner | 12th team |
| Division 1 Södra 2012 | Division 2 2013 | Norrby IF | 13th team |
| Division 1 Södra 2012 | Division 2 2013 | IK Gauthiod | 14th team |

=== International qualifications ===
| Qualified for | Enters | Team | Reason |
|---|---|---|---|
| UEFA Champions League 2013–14 | 2nd qual. round | IF Elfsborg | Winners of 2012 Allsvenskan |
| UEFA Europa League 2013–14 | 2nd qual. round | BK Häcken | Runners-up of 2012 Allsvenskan |
| UEFA Europa League 2013–14 | 2nd qual. round | IFK Göteborg | Winners of 2012–13 Svenska Cupen |
| UEFA Europa League 2013–14 | 1st qual. round | Malmö FF | 3rd team in 2012 Allsvenskan |

== Domestic results ==
=== 2012 Allsvenskan ===
Locations of the 2012 Allsvenskan teams

| Pos | Team | Pld | W | D | L | GF | GA | GD | Pts | Qualification or relegation |
|---|---|---|---|---|---|---|---|---|---|---|
| 1 | IF Elfsborg (C) | 30 | 18 | 5 | 7 | 48 | 29 | +19 | 59 | Qualification to Champions League second qualifying round |
| 2 | BK Häcken | 30 | 17 | 6 | 7 | 67 | 36 | +31 | 57 | Qualification to Europa League second qualifying round |
| 3 | Malmö FF | 30 | 16 | 8 | 6 | 49 | 33 | +16 | 56 | Qualification to Europa League first qualifying round |
| 4 | AIK | 30 | 15 | 10 | 5 | 41 | 27 | +14 | 55 | |
| 5 | IFK Norrköping | 30 | 15 | 7 | 8 | 50 | 43 | +7 | 52 | |
| 6 | Helsingborgs IF | 30 | 13 | 11 | 6 | 52 | 33 | +19 | 50 | |
| 7 | IFK Göteborg | 30 | 9 | 12 | 9 | 36 | 41 | −5 | 39 | Qualification to Europa League second qualifying round (Note: IFK Göteborg qualified for the 2013–14 UEFA Europa League second qualifying round by winning the 2012–13 Svenska Cupen.) |
| 8 | Åtvidabergs FF | 30 | 9 | 10 | 11 | 48 | 48 | 0 | 37 | |
| 9 | Djurgårdens IF | 30 | 8 | 13 | 9 | 37 | 40 | −3 | 37 | |
| 10 | Kalmar FF | 30 | 10 | 7 | 13 | 36 | 45 | −9 | 37 | |
| 11 | Gefle IF | 30 | 9 | 9 | 12 | 26 | 37 | −11 | 36 | Qualification to Europa League first qualifying round (Note: Sweden was among the best three associations in the UEFA Fair Play ranking and thus received an additional spot in the first qualifying round of the Europa League, Gefle IF received the qualifying spot for their ranking in Allsvenskans Fair Play ranking.) |
| 12 | Mjällby AIF | 30 | 8 | 10 | 12 | 33 | 39 | −6 | 34 | |
| 13 | Syrianska FC | 30 | 9 | 7 | 14 | 35 | 45 | −10 | 34 | |
| 14 | GIF Sundsvall (R) | 30 | 6 | 11 | 13 | 35 | 46 | −11 | 29 | Qualification to Relegation play-offs |
| 15 | Örebro SK (R) | 30 | 5 | 9 | 16 | 32 | 46 | −14 | 24 | Relegation to Superettan |
| 16 | GAIS (R) | 30 | 1 | 9 | 20 | 24 | 61 | −37 | 12 | Relegation to Superettan |

Source: svenskfotboll.se (in Swedish)
Rules for classification: 1) points; 2) goal difference; 3) number of goals scored.
(C) Champions; (R) Relegated

=== 2012 Allsvenskan qualification play-offs ===
10 November 2012
14:30

| Halmstads BK | 3–0 | GIF Sundsvall |
|---|---|---|
| Magyar 59'; Steindórsson 62'; Antonsson 72' | Report |

Örjans Vall, Halmstad
Attendance: 5,839
Referee: Jonas Eriksson (Stockholm)

17 November 2012
14:30

| GIF Sundsvall | 4–3 | Halmstads BK |
|---|---|---|
| Helg 29', 81'; Holster 42'; 76' (o.g.) | Report | Steindórsson 33' (pen.); Baldvinsson 68'; Boman 78' |

Norrporten Arena, Sundsvall
Attendance: 1,832
Referee: Martin Hansson (Holmsjö)

Halmstads BK won 6–4 on aggregate.

=== 2012 Superettan ===
Location of the 2012 Superettan teams

| Pos | Team | Pld | W | D | L | GF | GA | GD | Pts | Promotion, qualification or relegation |
|---|---|---|---|---|---|---|---|---|---|---|
| 1 | Östers IF (C, P) | 30 | 20 | 6 | 4 | 57 | 28 | +29 | 66 | Promotion to Allsvenskan |
| 2 | IF Brommapojkarna (P) | 30 | 20 | 1 | 9 | 61 | 40 | +21 | 61 | Promotion to Allsvenskan |
| 3 | Halmstads BK (O, P) | 30 | 16 | 8 | 6 | 61 | 33 | +28 | 56 | Qualification to Promotion playoffs |
| 4 | Hammarby IF | 30 | 13 | 10 | 7 | 40 | 33 | +7 | 49 | |
| 5 | Ljungskile SK | 30 | 11 | 9 | 10 | 36 | 36 | 0 | 42 | |
| 6 | Landskrona BoIS | 30 | 12 | 5 | 13 | 35 | 43 | −8 | 41 | |
| 7 | Jönköpings Södra IF | 30 | 10 | 10 | 10 | 52 | 47 | +5 | 40 | |
| 8 | Assyriska FF | 30 | 11 | 6 | 13 | 44 | 49 | −5 | 39 | |
| 9 | Ängelholms FF | 30 | 10 | 9 | 11 | 40 | 46 | −6 | 39 | |
| 10 | IK Brage | 30 | 10 | 9 | 11 | 35 | 45 | −10 | 39 | |
| 11 | Varbergs BoIS | 30 | 8 | 13 | 9 | 49 | 52 | −3 | 37 | |
| 12 | Degerfors IF | 30 | 9 | 8 | 13 | 46 | 53 | −7 | 35 | |
| 13 | Falkenbergs FF (O) | 30 | 8 | 10 | 12 | 45 | 47 | −2 | 34 | Qualification to Relegation playoffs |
| 14 | IFK Värnamo (O) | 30 | 8 | 6 | 16 | 47 | 54 | −7 | 30 | Qualification to Relegation playoffs |
| 15 | Trelleborgs FF (R) | 30 | 8 | 5 | 17 | 40 | 55 | −15 | 29 | Relegation to Division 1 |
| 16 | Umeå FC (R) | 30 | 6 | 5 | 19 | 34 | 61 | −27 | 23 | Relegation to Division 1 |

Source: svenskfotboll.se (in Swedish)
Rules for classification: 1) points; 2) goal difference; 3) number of goals scored.
(C) Champions; (O) Play-off winners; (P) Promoted; (R) Relegated

=== 2012 Superettan qualification play-offs ===
7 November 2012
19:00

| BK Forward | 0 – 0 | Falkenbergs FF |
|---|---|---|
| | Report |

Behrn Arena, Örebro
Attendance: 2,661
Referee: Dragan Banjac (Haninge)
11 November 2012
14:00

| Falkenbergs FF | 2 – 1 | BK Forward |
|---|---|---|
| Krizanović 9'; Svahn 69' | Report | 14' (o.g.) |

Falkenbergs IP, Falkenberg
Referee: Kristoffer Karlsson (Helsingborg)

Falkenbergs FF won 2–1 on aggregate.

7 November 2012
19:00

| Lunds BK | 0 – 2 | IFK Värnamo |
|---|---|---|
| | Report | Ferizi 45'; Abdulrahman 84' |

Klostergårdens IP, Lund
Attendance: 1,888
Referee: Magnus Ahlsén (Linköping)
11 November 2012
15:00

| IFK Värnamo | 2 – 2 | Lunds BK |
|---|---|---|
| Abdulrahman 15'; Zlojutro 40' | Report | Jönsson 77'; Björkén 85' |

Finnvedsvallen, Värnamo
Attendance: 1,778
Referee: Mohammed Al-Hakim (Köping)

IFK Värnamo won 4–2 on aggregate.

=== 2012 Division 1 Norra ===
| Pos | Team | Pld | W | D | L | GF | GA | GD | Pts | Promotion or relegation |
|---|---|---|---|---|---|---|---|---|---|---|
| 1 | Östersunds FK (C, P) | 26 | 15 | 8 | 3 | 50 | 21 | +29 | 53 | Promotion to Superettan |
| 2 | BK Forward | 26 | 16 | 5 | 5 | 50 | 25 | +25 | 53 | Qualification to Promotion playoffs |
| 3 | IK Sirius | 26 | 16 | 4 | 6 | 51 | 20 | +31 | 52 | |
| 4 | Vasalunds IF | 26 | 14 | 6 | 6 | 43 | 24 | +19 | 48 | |
| 5 | IK Frej | 26 | 14 | 6 | 6 | 48 | 34 | +14 | 48 | |
| 6 | Eskilstuna City | 26 | 12 | 4 | 10 | 38 | 44 | −6 | 40 | |
| 7 | Västerås SK | 26 | 10 | 6 | 10 | 46 | 43 | +3 | 36 | |
| 8 | Dalkurd FF | 26 | 9 | 7 | 10 | 56 | 50 | +6 | 34 | |
| 9 | Sandvikens IF | 26 | 9 | 7 | 10 | 43 | 45 | −2 | 34 | |
| 10 | IFK Luleå | 26 | 9 | 4 | 13 | 41 | 50 | −9 | 31 | |
| 11 | FC Väsby United | 26 | 9 | 3 | 14 | 36 | 43 | −7 | 30 | |
| 12 | Syrianska IF Kerburan (R) | 26 | 7 | 3 | 16 | 34 | 70 | −36 | 24 | Relegation to Division 2 |
| 13 | Akropolis IF (R) | 26 | 5 | 5 | 16 | 27 | 46 | −19 | 20 | Relegation to Division 2 |
| 14 | Enköpings SK (R) | 26 | 2 | 2 | 22 | 19 | 67 | −48 | 8 | Relegation to Division 2 |

Source: svenskfotboll.se
Rules for classification: 1) points; 2) goal difference; 3) number of goals scored.
(C) Champions; (P) Promoted; (R) Relegated

=== 2012 Division 1 Södra ===
| Pos | Team | Pld | W | D | L | GF | GA | GD | Pts | Promotion or relegation |
|---|---|---|---|---|---|---|---|---|---|---|
| 1 | Örgryte IS (C, P) | 26 | 18 | 7 | 1 | 65 | 17 | +48 | 61 | Promotion to Superettan |
| 2 | Lunds BK | 26 | 17 | 5 | 4 | 49 | 21 | +28 | 56 | Qualification to Promotion playoffs |
| 3 | IK Oddevold | 26 | 16 | 4 | 6 | 49 | 30 | +19 | 52 | |
| 4 | Kristianstads FF | 26 | 11 | 6 | 9 | 36 | 33 | +3 | 39 | |
| 5 | FC Trollhättan | 26 | 9 | 9 | 8 | 47 | 43 | +4 | 36 | |
| 6 | Skövde AIK | 26 | 9 | 8 | 9 | 41 | 42 | −1 | 35 | |
| 7 | IF Sylvia | 26 | 9 | 4 | 13 | 40 | 55 | −15 | 31 | |
| 8 | Karlstad BK | 26 | 7 | 9 | 10 | 37 | 46 | −9 | 30 | |
| 9 | Qviding FIF | 26 | 8 | 6 | 12 | 31 | 40 | −9 | 30 | |
| 10 | Utsiktens BK | 26 | 8 | 5 | 13 | 32 | 39 | −7 | 29 | |
| 11 | IF Limhamn Bunkeflo | 26 | 7 | 7 | 12 | 37 | 45 | −8 | 28 | |
| 12 | IK Sleipner (R) | 26 | 7 | 7 | 12 | 37 | 53 | −16 | 28 | Relegation to Division 2 |
| 13 | Norrby IF (R) | 26 | 6 | 7 | 13 | 34 | 53 | −19 | 25 | Relegation to Division 2 |
| 14 | IK Gauthiod (R) | 26 | 7 | 2 | 17 | 35 | 53 | −18 | 23 | Relegation to Division 2 |

Source: svenskfotboll.se
Rules for classification: 1) points; 2) goal difference; 3) number of goals scored.
(C) Champions; (P) Promoted; (R) Relegated

=== 2012 Supercupen ===
Final

24 March 2012
14:00 (UTC+1)

| Helsingborgs IF | 2–0 | AIK |
|---|---|---|
| Bouaouzan 58', 70' | Report |

Olympia, Helsingborg
Attendance: 5,590
Referee: Markus Strömbergsson (Gävle)

== National team fixtures and results ==
18 January 2012
19:00 UTC+3
Friendly
№ 944

| Sweden | 2–0 | Bahrain |
|---|---|---|
| Hysén 58' (pen.); Hiljemark 81' | Report |

Thani bin Jassim Stadium, Doha, Doha, Qatar
Attendance: 100
Referee: Banjar Al Dosari (Qatar)
23 January 2012
16:00 UTC+3
Friendly
№ 945

| Qatar U23 | 0–5 | Sweden |
|---|---|---|
| | Report | Durmaz 50'; Claesson 60'; Hysén 69', 90+2'; Thern 84' |

Jassim Bin Hamad Stadium, Doha
Attendance: 200
Referee: Ali Sabah Adday (Iraq)
29 February 2012
20:30 UTC+3
Friendly
№ 946

| Croatia | 1–3 | Sweden |
|---|---|---|
| Olsson 44' (o.g.) | Report | Ibrahimović 13' (pen.); Larsson 47', 69' |

Stadion Maksimir, Zagreb
Attendance: 7,000
Referee: Mitja Žganec (Slovenia)
30 May 2012
20:15 UTC+2
Friendly
№ 947

| Sweden | 3–2 | Iceland |
|---|---|---|
| Ibrahimović 2'; Toivonen 14'; Wilhelmsson 77' | Report | Sigþórsson 26'; Jónasson 90+4' |

Gamla Ullevi, Gothenburg
Attendance: 14,379
Referee: Peter Rasmussen (Denmark)
5 June 2012
19:00 UTC+2
Friendly
№ 948

| Sweden | 2–1 | Serbia |
|---|---|---|
| Toivonen 23'; Ibrahimović 52' (pen.) | Report | Subotić 27' |

Råsunda Stadium, Solna
Attendance: 20,691
Referee: Felix Brych (Germany)
11 June 2012
21:45 UTC+3
Euro 2012 Group D
№ 949

| Ukraine | 2–1 | Sweden |
|---|---|---|
| Shevchenko 55', 62' | Report | Ibrahimović 52' |

Olympic Stadium, Kiev
Attendance: 64,290
Referee: Cüneyt Çakır (Turkey)
15 June 2012
19:00 UTC+3
Euro 2012 Group D
№ 950

| Sweden | 2–3 | England |
|---|---|---|
| Johnson 49' (o.g.); Mellberg 59' | Report | Carroll 23'; Walcott 64'; Welbeck 78' |

Olympic Stadium, Kiev
Attendance: 64,640
Referee: Damir Skomina (Slovenia)
19 June 2012
21:45 UTC+3
Euro 2012 Group D
№ 951

| Sweden | 2–0 | France |
|---|---|---|
| Ibrahimović 54'; Larsson 90+1' | Report |

Olympic Stadium, Kiev
Attendance: 63,010
Referee: Pedro Proença (Portugal)
15 August 2012
20:00 UTC+2
Friendly
№ 952

| Sweden | 0–3 | Brazil |
|---|---|---|
| | Report | Damião 32'; Pato 84', 86' (pen.) |

Råsunda Stadium, Solna
Attendance: 32,781
Referee: Viktor Kassai (Hungary)
6 September 2012
19:00 UTC+2
Friendly
№ 953

| Sweden | 1–0 | China |
|---|---|---|
| Elmander 47' | Report |

Olympia, Helsingborg
Attendance: 9,073
Referee: Mattias Gestranius (Finland)
11 September 2012
20:30 UTC+2
2014 World Cup qualification
№ 954

| Sweden | 2–0 | Kazakhstan |
|---|---|---|
| Elm 37'; Berg 90+4' | Report |

Swedbank Stadion, Malmö
Attendance: 20,414
Referee: Serhiy Boiko (Ukraine)
12 October 2012
17:00 UTC+1
2014 World Cup qualification
№ 955

| Faroe Islands | 1–2 | Sweden |
|---|---|---|
| Baldvinsson 57' | Report | Kačaniklić 65'; Ibrahimović 75' |

Tórsvøllur, Tórshavn
Attendance: 5,079
Referee: Anastasios Sidiropoulos (Greece)
16 October 2012
20:45 UTC+2
2014 World Cup qualification
№ 956

| Germany | 4–4 | Sweden |
|---|---|---|
| Klose 8', 15'; Mertesacker 39'; Özil 56' | Report | Ibrahimović 62'; Lustig 64'; Elmander 76'; Elm 90+3' |

Olympiastadion, Berlin
Attendance: 72,369
Referee: Pedro Proença (Portugal)
14 November 2012
20:30 UTC+1
Friendly
№ 957

| Sweden | 4–2 | England |
|---|---|---|
| Ibrahimović 20', 77', 84', 90+1' | Report | Welbeck 35'; Caulker 38' |

Friends Arena, Solna
Attendance: 49,967
Referee: Svein Oddvar Moen (Norway)

== Swedish clubs' performance in Europe ==
These are the results of the Swedish teams in European competitions during the 2012–13 season. (Swedish team score displayed first)

| Team | Contest | Round | Opponent | 1st leg score* | 2nd leg score** | Aggregate score |
|---|---|---|---|---|---|---|
| Helsingborgs IF | UEFA Champions League | Second qualifying round | (Wales) The New Saints | 0–0 | 3–0 | W 3–0 |
| Helsingborgs IF | UEFA Champions League | Third qualifying round | (Poland) Śląsk Wrocław | 3–0 | 3–1 | W 6–1 |
| Helsingborgs IF | UEFA Champions League | Play-off round | (Scotland) Celtic | 0–2 | 0–2 | L 0–4 |
| Helsingborgs IF | UEFA Europa League | Group stage | (Netherlands) Twente | 2–2 | 3–1 | None |
| Helsingborgs IF | UEFA Europa League | Group stage | (Germany) Hannover 96 | 1–2 | 2–3 | None |
| Helsingborgs IF | UEFA Europa League | Group stage | (Spain) Levante | 1–3 | 0–1 | None |
| AIK | UEFA Europa League | Second qualifying round | (Iceland) FH | 1–1 | 1–0 | W 2–1 |
| AIK | UEFA Europa League | Third qualifying round | (Poland) Lech Poznań | 3–0 | 0–1 | W 3–1 |
| AIK | UEFA Europa League | Play-off round | (Russia) CSKA Moscow | 0–1 | 2–0 | W 2–1 |
| AIK | UEFA Europa League | Group stage | (Netherlands) PSV Eindhoven | 1–0 | 1–1 | None |
| AIK | UEFA Europa League | Group stage | (Italy) Napoli | 1–2 | 0–4 | None |
| AIK | UEFA Europa League | Group stage | (Ukraine) Dnipro Dnipropetrovsk | 2–3 | 0–4 | None |
| IF Elfsborg | UEFA Europa League | First qualifying round | (Malta) Floriana | 8–0 | 4–0 | W 12–0 |
| IF Elfsborg | UEFA Europa League | Second qualifying round | (Moldova) Dacia Chişinău | 0–1 | 2–0 | W 2–1 |
| IF Elfsborg | UEFA Europa League | Third qualifying round | (Denmark) Horsens | 1–1 | 2–3 | L 3–4 |
| Kalmar FF | UEFA Europa League | First qualifying round | (Northern Ireland) Cliftonville | 0–1 | 4–0 | W 4–1 |
| Kalmar FF | UEFA Europa League | Second qualifying round | (Croatia) Osijek | 3–1 | 3–0 | W 6–1 |
| Kalmar FF | UEFA Europa League | Third qualifying round | (Switzerland) Young Boys | 1–0 | 0–3 | L 1–3 |

* For group games in Europa League, score in home game is displayed
** For group games in Europa League, score in away game is displayed
