= 2011 Division 2 (Swedish football) =

Swedish League Division 2
- Season: 2011
- Champions: Östersunds FK; Enköpings SK FK; Eskilstuna City FK; IK Gauthiod; Utsiktens BK; IFK Klagshamn
- Promoted: Östersunds FK; Enköpings SK FK; Eskilstuna City FK; IK Gauthiod; Utsiktens BK; Sandvikens IF
- Relegated: 12 teams

Statistics of Swedish football Division 2 for the 2011 season.

== League standings ==
=== Norrland 2011 ===
Pos	Team	Pld	W	D	L	GF	GA	GD	Pts	Promotion or relegation
1	Östersunds FK	22	16	4	2	51	12	+39	52	Promotion to Division 1
2	Hudiksvalls ABK	22	14	1	7	57	25	+32	43	
3	Mariehem SK	22	14	1	7	45	29	+16	43	
4	Anundsjö IF	22	12	2	8	41	36	+5	38	
5	Skellefteå FF	22	11	3	8	41	30	+11	36	
6	Umedalens IF	22	10	2	10	42	37	+5	32	
7	Piteå IF	22	9	5	8	41	38	+3	32	
8	Härnösands FF	22	8	6	8	38	33	+5	30	
9	Morön BK	22	8	4	10	41	44	−3	28	
10	Sollefteå GIF FF	22	6	5	11	26	31	−5	23	Relegation playoffs to Division 3
11	IF Älgarna	22	3	6	13	26	49	−23	15	Relegation to Division 3
12	Junsele IF	22	1	1	20	19	104	−85	4	Relegation to Division 3

=== Norra Svealand 2011 ===
Pos	Team	Pld	W	D	L	GF	GA	GD	Pts	Promotion or relegation
1	Enköpings SK FK	22	15	3	4	47	18	+29	48	Promotion to Division 1
2	Sandvikens IF	22	14	4	4	36	21	+15	46	Promotion to Division 1
3	Gamla Upsala SK	22	11	6	5	35	23	+12	39	
4	Skiljebo SK	22	10	4	8	41	32	+9	34	
5	Sollentuna United FF	22	10	4	8	35	32	+3	34	
6	Västerås IK	22	8	7	7	34	33	+1	31	
7	Strömsbergs IF	22	7	9	6	31	26	+5	30	
8	Rotebro IS FF	22	8	6	8	36	32	+4	30	
9	Spårvägens FF	22	7	3	12	28	32	−4	24	
10	Falu FK	22	7	2	13	28	45	−17	23	Relegation playoffs to Division 3
11	BKV Norrtälje	22	6	3	13	33	53	−20	21	Relegation to Division 3
12	Kvarnsvedens IK	22	2	3	17	23	60	−37	9	Relegation to Division 3

=== Södra Svealand 2011 ===
Pos	Team	Pld	W	D	L	GF	GA	GD	Pts	Promotion or relegation
1	Eskilstuna City FK	22	14	5	3	53	14	+39	47	Promotion to Division 1
2	FOC Farsta	22	14	3	5	53	34	+19	45	
3	Enskede IK	22	10	7	5	39	28	+11	37	
4	Värmbols FC	22	9	7	6	38	36	+2	34	
5	Nyköpings BIS	22	9	6	7	29	25	+4	33	
6	Arameisk-Syrianska IF	22	7	9	6	27	24	+3	30	
7	Konyaspor KIF	22	8	6	8	30	28	+2	30	
8	Assyriska IF Norrköping	22	7	7	8	31	39	−8	28	
9	Värmdö IF	22	7	3	12	26	39	−13	24	
10	FC Gute	22	5	7	10	22	37	−15	22	Relegation playoffs to Division 3
11	Smedby AIS	22	4	6	12	26	47	−21	18	Relegation to Division 3
12	BK Kenty	22	4	2	16	23	46	−23	14	Relegation to Division 3

=== Norra Götaland 2011 ===
Pos	Team	Pld	W	D	L	GF	GA	GD	Pts	Promotion or relegation
1	IK Gauthiod	22	13	5	4	30	23	+7	44	Promotion to Division 1
2	Assyriska BK	22	12	3	7	40	22	+18	39	
3	Rynninge IK	22	11	5	6	50	33	+17	38	
4	Tibro AIK FK	22	11	3	8	42	42	0	36	
5	Carlstad United BK	22	10	3	9	34	35	−1	33	
6	Gunnilse IS	22	9	4	9	36	32	+4	31	
7	Ytterby IS	22	8	6	8	40	35	+5	30	
8	Götene IF	22	9	3	10	48	51	−3	30	
9	Jonsereds IF	22	8	4	10	32	40	−8	28	
10	KB Karlskoga FF	22	8	3	11	38	38	0	27	Relegation playoffs to Division 3
11	Skoftebyns IF	22	6	5	11	28	41	−13	23	Relegation to Division 3
12	Örebro SK Ungdom	22	3	4	15	26	52	−26	13	Relegation to Division 3

=== Västra Götaland 2011 ===
Pos	Team	Pld	W	D	L	GF	GA	GD	Pts	Promotion or relegation
1	Utsiktens BK	22	15	4	3	49	23	+26	49	Promotion to Division 1
2	Vimmerby IF	22	10	7	5	47	32	+15	37	
3	Torslanda IK	22	10	5	7	24	22	+2	35	
4	Lindome GIF	22	9	7	6	44	35	+9	34	
5	IS Halmia	22	8	8	6	43	32	+11	32	
6	IK Tord	22	9	3	10	26	29	−3	30	
7	Tvååkers IF	22	8	5	9	34	35	−1	29	
8	Tenhults IF	22	9	1	12	30	40	−10	28	
9	Västra Frölunda IF	22	6	8	8	33	38	−5	26	
10	Kållered SK	22	6	6	10	23	43	−20	24	Relegation playoffs to Division 3
11	Kinna IF	22	5	6	11	23	35	−12	21	Relegation to Division 3
12	Gislaveds IS	22	5	4	13	27	39	−12	19	Relegation to Division 3

=== Södra Götaland 2011 ===
Pos	Team	Pld	W	D	L	GF	GA	GD	Pts	Promotion or relegation
1	IFK Klagshamn	22	14	7	1	37	13	+24	49	Promotion to Division 1
2	Ramlösa Södra FF	22	11	6	5	55	45	+10	39	
3	Ljungby IF	22	11	5	6	44	30	+14	38	
4	BK Olympic	22	11	4	7	32	23	+9	37	
5	Karlskrona AIF	22	8	5	9	34	30	+4	29	
6	Kvarnby IK	22	7	6	9	31	33	−2	27	
7	Lindsdals IF	22	7	6	9	38	41	−3	27	
8	Högaborgs BK	22	7	5	10	32	41	−9	26	
9	Sölvesborgs GoIF	22	4	11	7	35	42	−7	23	
10	GIF Nike	22	3	13	6	28	31	−3	22	Relegation playoffs to Division 3
11	VMA IK	22	5	5	12	33	53	−20	20	Relegation to Division 3
12	Höllvikens GIF	22	4	7	11	28	45	−17	19	Relegation to Division 3

== Player of the year awards ==
Ever since 2003 the online bookmaker Unibet have given out awards at the end of the season to the best players in Division 2. The recipients are decided by a jury of sportsjournalists, coaches and football experts. The names highlighted in green won the overall national award.

Norrland
Position	Player	Club
GK	(Georgia (country)) Besarion Kodalaev	Östersunds FK
DF	(England) Steve Burton	Östersunds FK
MF	(Estonia) Siksten Kasimir	Hudiksvalls FF
FW	(Sweden) Joel Stillmark	Hudiksvalls FF

Norra Svealand
Position	Player	Club
GK	(Sweden) Tim Markström	Sandvikens IF
DF	(Sweden) David Svanberg	Sandvikens IF
MF	(Sweden) Tom Nodén	Enköpings SK
FW	(Sweden) Joel Rajalakso	Enköpings SK

Södra Svealand
Position	Player	Club
GK	(Sweden) Nicklas Bergh	Eskilstuna City
DF	(Sweden) Eldin Kozica	Arameisk-Syrianska IF
MF	(Sweden) Gustav Walkin	Enskede IK
FW	(Sweden) Özgür Yasar	Konyaspor KIF

Norra Götaland
Position	Player	Club
GK	(Sweden) Tobias Wennergren	IK Gauthiod
DF	(Sweden) Pontus Jakobsson	Örebro SK Ungdom
MF	(Sweden) Bastian Rojas Diaz	Carlstad United BK
FW	(Sweden) Alexander Hjalmarsson	KB Karlskoga

Västra Götaland
Position	Player	Club
GK	(Sweden) David Stenman	Torslanda IK
DF	(Sweden) Petter Björlund	Utsiktens BK
MF	(Sweden) John Andersson	Utsiktens BK
FW	(Sweden) Sonny Karlsson	Utsiktens BK

Södra Götaland
Position	Player	Club
GK	(Denmark) Robin Olsen	IFK Klagshamn
DF	(Sweden) Arsim Arifi	IFK Klagshamn
MF	(Sweden) Armin Pasagic	IFK Klagshamn
FW	(Sweden) Samir Blekic	Sölvesborgs GoIF
