= Arash Bayat =

Iranian-Swedish footballer

Personal information
- Full name: Arash Bayat
- Date of birth: 19 July 1983 (age 43)
- Place of birth: Tehran, Iran
- Height: 1.74 m (5 ft 9 in)
- Position: Central midfielder

Youth career
- –1993: IK Östria Lambohov
- 1994–2000: Västra Frölunda IF

Senior career*
Years	Team	Apps	(Gls)
2000–2005	Västra Frölunda IF	95	(17)
2006–2008	GIF Sundsvall	63	(13)
2008	→ IFK Mariehamn (loan)	10	(2)
2009	Qviding FIF	29	(4)
2010	Ljungskile SK	22	(4)
2011–2012	Assyriska BK	39	(6)
2013–2015	Qviding FIF	53	(12)
2016–2017	Västra Frölunda IF	17	(2)
Total		328	(60)

International career
1999–2000	Sweden U17	3	(0)
2001	Sweden U19	5	(0)
- * Club domestic league appearances and goals as of 24 May 2019

Arash Bayat (Persian: آرش بیات; born 19 July 1983) is a former Iranian-Swedish footballer, Arash was voted the best middle eastern player of Sweden in 4 different time: 2001, 2002, 2003, 2005.

== Career ==
Bayat has made an impressive career in Swedish second tier football with Västra Frölunda IF and GIF Sundsvall. GIF took the step up to the Swedish top flight, Allsvenskan at the end of the 2007 season. On 17 August 2008 it was announced that Bayat would join IFK Mariehamn for the remainder of the 2008 season on a loan. In December 2010 resigned his contract with Superettan club Ljungskile SK and joined as player to Assyriska BK.

=== Attributes ===
He usually plays as a midfielder but can also play as a striker if required.

== International career ==
Bayat played from 1999 to 2001, 37 games and scored sixteen goals for the Swedish U-16 and U-18 national football team.

== Language ==
Persian is his official but he learned Swedish after he moved to Sweden.

== Private life ==
He holds Swedish and Iranian citizenships.

== Early life ==
He was born in Tehran but moved to Sweden with his family at an early age.

== Career statistics ==
As of 24 May 2019

Club	Division	Season	League		Cup		Other		Total	
Club	Division	Season	Apps	Goals	Apps	Goals	Apps	Goals	Apps	Goals
Västra Frölunda	Allsvenskan	2000	1	0	0	0	–		1	0
Västra Frölunda	Superettan	2001	4	0	0	0	–		4	0
Västra Frölunda	Superettan	2002	9	1	0	0	–		9	1
Västra Frölunda	Superettan	2003	28	10	0	0	–		28	10
Västra Frölunda	Superettan	2004	28	4	0	0	–		28	4
Västra Frölunda	Superettan	2005	25	2	0	0	–		25	2
Västra Frölunda	Totals		95	17	0	0	–		95	17
Sundsvall	Superettan	2006	29	9	0	0	–		29	9
Sundsvall	Superettan	2007	28	4	0	0	–		28	4
Sundsvall	Allsvenskan	2008	6	0	0	0	–		6	0
Sundsvall	Totals		63	13	0	0	–		63	13
Mariehamn	Veikkausliiga	2008	10	2	0	0	–		10	2
Qviding	Superettan	2009	29	4	1	0	1	0	31	4
Ljungskile	Superettan	2010	22	4	2	0	–		24	4
Assyriska	Division 2	2011	21	4	0	0	–		21	4
Assyriska	Division 2	2012	18	2	0	0	–		18	2
Assyriska	Totals		39	6	0	0	–		39	6
Qviding	Division 1	2013	22	7	0	0	–		22	7
Qviding	Division 1	2014	13	2	0	0	–		13	2
Qviding	Division 1	2015	18	3	0	0	–		18	3
Qviding	Totals		53	12	0	0	–		53	12
Västra Frölunda	Division 3	2016	16	2	0	0	–		16	2
Västra Frölunda	Division 3	2017	1	0	0	0	–		1	0
Västra Frölunda	Totals		17	2	0	0	–		17	2
Career Total			328	60	3	0	1	0	332	60
