= 2012 Division 1 (Swedish football) =

Division 1
- Season: 2012
- Champions: Östersunds FK; Örgryte IS
- Promoted: Östersunds FK; Örgryte IS
- Relegated: Syrianska IF Kerburan; Akropolis IF; Enköpings SK; IK Sleipner; Norrby IF; IK Gauthiod
- Top goalscorer: Johan Patriksson (24)

The 2012 Division 1, part of the 2012 Swedish football season, was the 7th season of Sweden's third-tier football league in its current format. The 2012 fixtures were released on 12 December 2011. The season began on 15 April 2012 and ended on 28 October 2012.

== Teams ==
A total of 28 teams contested the league divided into two division, Norra and Södra. 20 returning from the 2011 season, two relegated from Superettan and six promoted from Division 2. The champion of each division qualified directly for promotion to Superettan, the two runners-up has to play a play-off against the thirteenth and fourteenth team from Superettan to decide who plays in Superettan 2013. The bottom three teams in each division qualified directly for relegation to Division 2.

=== Stadia and locations ===
Location of the 2012 Division 1 teams. Division 1 Norra are red dots while Division 1 Södra are green dots.

==== Norra ====
Team	Location	Stadium	Stadium capacity^{1}
Akropolis IF	Stockholm	Akalla BP	2,000
Dalkurd FF	Borlänge	Domnarvsvallen	6,500
Enköpings SK	Enköping	Enavallen	4,500
Eskilstuna City	Eskilstuna	Tunavallen	7,800
BK Forward	Örebro	Trängens IP	4,700
IK Frej	Täby	Vikingavallen	1,250
IFK Luleå	Luleå	Skogsvallen	7,000
Sandvikens IF	Sandviken	Jernvallen	7,000
IK Sirius	Uppsala	Studenternas IP	7,600
Syrianska IF Kerburan	Västerås	Swedbank Park	7,000
Vasalunds IF	Stockholm	Skytteholms IP	3,000
Väsby United	Upplands Väsby	Vilundavallen	4,000
Västerås SK	Västerås	Swedbank Park	7,000
Östersunds FK	Östersund	Jämtkraft Arena	5,000

==== Södra ====
Team	Location	Stadium	Stadium capacity^{1}
IK Gauthiod	Grästorp	Lunnevi IP	1,500
Karlstads BK	Karlstad	Tingvalla IP	10,000
Kristianstads FF	Kristianstad	Kristianstads IP	6,000
IF Limhamn Bunkeflo	Malmö	Limhamns IP	2,800
IF Limhamn Bunkeflo	Malmö	Malmö Stadion (11 June – 25 August)	27,500
Lunds BK	Lund	Klostergårdens IP	8,560
Norrby IF	Borås	Borås Arena	17,000
IK Oddevold	Uddevalla	Rimnersvallen	10,600
Qviding FIF	Gothenburg	Valhalla IP	4,000
Skövde AIK	Skövde	Södermalms IP	4,646
IK Sleipner	Norrköping	Idrottsparken	17,200
IF Sylvia	Norrköping	Idrottsparken	17,200
FC Trollhättan	Trollhättan	Edsborgs IP	5,100
Utsikten	Gothenburg	Ruddalens IP	5,000
Örgryte	Gothenburg	Gamla Ullevi	18,900

- ^{1} Correct as of end of 2011 season

== League tables ==
=== Norra ===
Pos	Team	Pld	W	D	L	GF	GA	GD	Pts	Promotion or relegation
1	Östersunds FK (C, P)	26	15	8	3	50	21	+29	53	Promotion to Superettan
2	BK Forward	26	16	5	5	50	25	+25	53	Qualification to Promotion playoffs
3	IK Sirius	26	16	4	6	51	20	+31	52	
4	Vasalunds IF	26	14	6	6	43	24	+19	48	
5	IK Frej	26	14	6	6	48	34	+14	48	
6	Eskilstuna City	26	12	4	10	38	44	−6	40	
7	Västerås SK	26	10	6	10	46	43	+3	36	
8	Dalkurd FF	26	9	7	10	56	50	+6	34	
9	Sandvikens IF	26	9	7	10	43	45	−2	34	
10	IFK Luleå	26	9	4	13	41	50	−9	31	
11	FC Väsby United	26	9	3	14	36	43	−7	30	
12	Syrianska IF Kerburan (R)	26	7	3	16	34	70	−36	24	Relegation to Division 2
13	Akropolis IF (R)	26	5	5	16	27	46	−19	20	Relegation to Division 2
14	Enköpings SK (R)	26	2	2	22	19	67	−48	8	Relegation to Division 2

Source: svenskfotboll.se
Rules for classification: 1) points; 2) goal difference; 3) number of goals scored.
(C) Champions; (P) Promoted; (R) Relegated

=== Södra ===
Pos	Team	Pld	W	D	L	GF	GA	GD	Pts	Promotion or relegation
1	Örgryte IS (C, P)	26	18	7	1	65	17	+48	61	Promotion to Superettan
2	Lunds BK	26	17	5	4	49	21	+28	56	Qualification to Promotion playoffs
3	IK Oddevold	26	16	4	6	49	30	+19	52	
4	Kristianstads FF	26	11	6	9	36	33	+3	39	
5	FC Trollhättan	26	9	9	8	47	43	+4	36	
6	Skövde AIK	26	9	8	9	41	42	−1	35	
7	IF Sylvia	26	9	4	13	40	55	−15	31	
8	Karlstad BK	26	7	9	10	37	46	−9	30	
9	Qviding FIF	26	8	6	12	31	40	−9	30	
10	Utsiktens BK	26	8	5	13	32	39	−7	29	
11	IF Limhamn Bunkeflo	26	7	7	12	37	45	−8	28	
12	IK Sleipner (R)	26	7	7	12	37	53	−16	28	Relegation to Division 2
13	Norrby IF (R)	26	6	7	13	34	53	−19	25	Relegation to Division 2
14	IK Gauthiod (R)	26	7	2	17	35	53	−18	23	Relegation to Division 2

Source: svenskfotboll.se
Rules for classification: 1) points; 2) goal difference; 3) number of goals scored.
(C) Champions; (P) Promoted; (R) Relegated

== Positions by round ==
=== Norra ===
Note: Some matches were played out of phase with the corresponding round, positions were corrected in hindsight.

Team ╲ Round	1	2	3	4	5	6	7	8	9	10	11	12	13	14	15	16	17	18	19	20	21	22	23	24	25	26
Östersunds FK	10	10	8	10	7	6	6	4	3	4	5	4	3	4	4	2	2	2	2	2	2	2	2	2	2	1
BK Forward	3	6	3	4	3	7	7	7	7	5	4	3	2	2	1	4	4	4	4	4	4	4	3	3	3	2
IK Sirius	7	4	6	3	2	3	2	2	4	2	2	2	4	3	3	1	1	1	1	1	1	1	1	1	1	3
Vasalunds IF	8	9	9	6	4	2	1	1	1	1	1	1	1	1	2	3	3	3	3	3	3	3	4	4	4	4
IK Frej	6	2	2	1	1	1	4	6	6	6	7	6	5	5	5	7	6	6	6	5	5	5	5	5	5	5
Eskilstuna City	5	5	7	9	10	10	9	9	9	10	10	10	10	8	8	6	7	7	7	8	8	8	7	6	6	6
Västerås SK	9	11	11	7	6	5	5	3	2	3	3	5	6	6	7	8	8	8	8	7	7	7	8	7	7	7
Dalkurd FF	1	3	5	8	9	8	8	8	8	9	8	8	9	10	11	9	9	9	9	9	9	9	9	9	8	8
Sandvikens IF	11	7	4	5	8	9	10	10	10	8	6	7	7	7	6	5	5	5	5	6	6	6	6	8	9	9
IFK Luleå	14	14	14	12	13	14	14	12	13	12	11	11	12	11	9	10	11	11	11	10	10	10	10	10	11	10
FC Väsby United	2	1	1	2	5	4	3	5	5	7	9	9	8	9	10	11	10	10	10	11	11	11	11	11	10	11
Syrianska IF Kerburan	4	8	10	11	12	12	12	13	12	14	13	12	11	12	12	13	12	12	12	12	12	12	12	12	12	12
Akropolis IF	13	12	12	13	11	11	11	11	11	11	12	13	13	13	13	12	13	13	13	13	13	13	13	13	13	13
Enköpings SK	12	13	13	14	14	13	13	14	14	13	14	14	14	14	14	14	14	14	14	14	14	14	14	14	14	14

Source: svenskfotboll.se (in Swedish)

=== Södra ===
Team ╲ Round	1	2	3	4	5	6	7	8	9	10	11	12	13	14	15	16	17	18	19	20	21	22	23	24	25	26
Örgryte IS	9	3	3	3	3	3	3	2	2	2	2	1	1	1	1	1	1	1	1	1	1	1	1	1	1	1
Lunds BK	3	1	1	1	1	1	1	1	1	1	1	2	2	2	2	2	2	2	2	2	2	2	3	3	2	2
IK Oddevold	1	6	5	7	8	5	5	4	3	3	3	3	3	3	3	3	3	3	3	3	3	3	2	2	3	3
Kristianstads FF	2	2	2	2	2	2	2	3	4	4	5	6	6	6	6	7	7	5	5	5	5	5	4	4	4	4
FC Trollhättan	6	4	7	5	7	8	8	8	7	6	8	8	9	7	7	6	6	6	6	6	6	6	6	6	5	5
Skövde AIK	8	12	8	6	5	4	4	5	5	5	4	4	4	4	4	4	4	4	4	4	4	4	5	5	6	6
IF Sylvia	10	7	4	4	6	7	6	7	9	9	6	5	5	5	5	5	5	7	7	7	7	7	7	9	10	7
Karlstad BK	7	11	13	13	14	14	13	13	12	13	13	13	12	12	12	8	8	9	9	9	9	9	9	8	9	8
Qviding FIF	14	9	11	8	4	6	7	6	6	8	9	10	11	11	9	9	9	8	8	8	8	8	8	7	7	9
Utsiktens BK	11	13	9	11	9	10	11	10	8	7	7	7	7	8	8	11	11	11	11	11	11	11	10	10	8	10
IF Limhamn Bunkeflo	4	8	10	12	13	13	14	14	14	12	12	12	13	13	13	13	13	10	10	10	10	10	11	11	11	11
IK Sleipner	12	14	14	14	10	11	12	12	13	14	14	14	14	14	14	14	14	14	14	14	14	14	13	13	12	12
Norrby IF	5	5	6	10	12	12	9	9	11	11	11	11	10	9	11	10	10	13	13	13	13	13	12	12	13	13
IK Gauthiod	13	10	12	9	11	9	10	11	10	10	10	9	8	10	10	12	12	12	12	12	12	12	14	14	14	14

Promotion to Superettan
Promotion play-offs
Relegation to Division 2

Source: svenskfotboll.se (in Swedish)

== Results ==
=== Norra ===
Home \ Away	AIF	DFF	ESK	ECFK	BKF	IKF	IFKL	SIF	IKS	SK	VIF	VU	VSK	ÖFK
Akropolis IF		2–4	0–1	0–0	1–1	1–2	0–3	3–0	0–3	2–0	0–0	1–2	4–3	0–2
Dalkurd FF	4–5		5–0	2–3	1–2	1–2	3–1	3–3	0–1	3–2	1–3	4–0	1–1	2–2
Enköpings SK	1–0	0–0		0–1	0–7	2–4	0–1	0–4	0–1	1–2	0–3	1–5	1–2	2–4
Eskilstuna City	2–0	3–1	1–0		2–1	4–2	2–1	2–2	1–0	1–3	1–3	1–1	1–3	0–1
BK Forward	0–0	2–1	2–1	3–1		3–0	2–1	3–2	1–0	5–0	2–0	0–0	3–0	0–4
IK Frej	1–3	4–0	2–0	1–1	1–0		3–2	2–0	2–2	3–0		2–0	2–2	1–0
IFK Luleå	3–2	2–2	1–1	7–1	0–1	1–4		0–0	2–1	3–2	1–0	2–1	1–0	1–3
Sandvikens IF	2–1	1–4	2–1	3–0	0–2	1–1	5–2		0–1	4–1	1–1	2–0	3–6	0–0
IK Sirius	2–0	4–1	2–0	2–1	3–1	0–0	4–1	3–1		7–0	0–1	2–1	3–1	0–1
Syrianska IF Kerburan	2–1	2–2	6–4	2–3	2–2	1–5	3–2	1–3	3–2		1–3	0–1	0–1	0–0
Vasalunds IF	1–0	1–4	5–1	2–1	0–1	4–0	3–0	2–1	0–0	0–1		3–2	3–1	2–2
FC Väsby United	2–0	1–3	2–0	0–2	2–1	1–2	3–1	1–1	1–6	6–0	1–2		1–4	1–0
Västerås SK	1–1	2–3	2–0	1–3	2–2	2–1	3–1	1–2	0–1	2–0	1–1	2–1		1–1
Östersunds FK	4–0	1–1	3–2	3–0	1–3	3–1	1–1	4–0	1–1	4–0	1–0	1–0	3–2	

Source: svenskfotboll.se (in Swedish)
Legend: Blue = home team win; Yellow = draw; Red = away team win.

=== Södra ===
Home \ Away	IKG	KBK	KFF	LB07	LBK	NIF	IKO	QFIF	SAIK	IKS	IFS	FCT	UBK	ÖIS
IK Gauthiod		1–2	4–1	1–2	2–1	3–3	0–1	2–1	1–2	4–1	2–3	2–1	2–0	0–1
Karlstad BK	2–2		1–3	2–0	0–0	3–2	0–1	2–2	1–1	0–0	1–2	2–2	2–1	1–4
Kristianstads FF	2–0	1–0		0–0	4–1	3–0	2–1	2–0	3–1	1–1	2–2	1–2	0–1	0–3
IF Limhamn Bunkeflo	2–3	3–0	1–2		0–3	1–1	2–3	1–1	4–1	4–3	3–1	0–2	2–1	1–3
Lunds BK	5–1	3–0	0–0	3–0		2–1	0–0	2–0	2–1	5–1	1–0	4–1	1–1	2–2
Norrby IF	3–2	4–2	1–1	1–1	2–3		1–2	2–1	0–3	1–1	2–1	0–3	1–1	0–3
IK Oddevold	2–0	3–2	0–1	2–1	1–0	3–0		2–1	1–1	1–2	5–2	4–2	2–1	2–2
Qviding FIF	1–0	3–4	4–0	1–1	0–2	0–1	2–0		0–0	2–1	3–1	0–0	1–1	1–4
Skövde AIK	2–1	2–2	2–1	2–2	0–3	4–0	0–2	2–1		2–2	3–6	3–0	3–1	0–1
IK Sleipner	2–1	3–1	2–1	2–0	0–1	1–4	2–4	6–0	1–2		0–0	0–1	1–0	0–4
IF Sylvia	2–0	0–3	0–2	4–3	1–2	2–0	0–3	1–3	1–0	2–2		1–4	2–1	2–2
FC Trollhättan	3–1	2–2	4–2	1–1	1–2	2–2	2–2	2–0	2–2	5–2	0–3		0–1	2–2
Utsiktens BK	2–0	1–2	1–1	1–2	0–1	2–1	3–2	1–2	2–0	1–1	4–1	3–2		0–2
Örgryte IS	6–0	0–0	1–0	1–0	2–0	3–1	1–0	0–1	2–2	6–0	4–0	1–1	5–1	

Source: svenskfotboll.se (in Swedish)
Legend: Blue = home team win; Yellow = draw; Red = away team win.

== Season statistics ==
=== Norra top scorers ===
Rank	Player	Club	Goals
1	(Sweden) Emir Smajic	Östersunds FK; Västerås SK	17
2	(Sweden) Björn Berglund	Sandvikens IF	16
3	(Sweden) Stellan Carlsson	BK Forward	15
3	(Sweden) Ante Björkebaum	IK Sirius	15
5	(Nigeria) Chidi Omeje	Dalkurd FF	14
6	(Sweden) Karlos Touma	Vasalunds IF	13
7	(Sweden) Anton Andersson	IFK Luleå	12
8	(Sweden) Kristoffer Näfver	BK Forward	11
9	(Sweden) Robert Walker	BK Forward	10
10	(Sweden) Per Mettävainio	IFK Luleå	9
10	(Sweden) Matias Ledezma	IK Frej	9
10	(Ghana) David Accam	Östersunds FK	9

=== Södra top scorers ===
Rank	Player	Club	Goals
1	(Sweden) Johan Patriksson	IK Oddevold	24
2	(Sweden) Emil Karlsson	Örgryte IS	15
3	(Denmark) Allan Borgvardt	IF Sylvia	14
4	(Sweden) Oskar Wallén	Örgryte IS	13
5	(Sweden) Gazmend Bahtiri	Karlstad BK	12
6	(Sweden) Josef Daoud	FC Trollhättan	11
7	(Sweden) Mihael Jevtic	Utsiktens BK	10
7	(Sweden) Linus Johansson	Skövde AIK	10
9	(Nigeria) Nsima Peter	Kristianstads FF	9
9	(Sweden) Erik Svensson	Utsiktens BK	9
9	(Sweden) Richard Henriksson	IF Limhamn Bunkeflo	9
9	(Sweden) Admir Osmancevic	Lunds BK	9

== Young Player Teams of the Year ==
At the end of each Division 1 season an all-star game is played called "Morgondagens Stjärnor" (English: "The Stars Of Tomorrow"). The two teams playing against each other consist of the best young players from each of the two leagues.

Norra Team
Position	Player	Club
GK	(Sweden) Tobias Wennergrund	Sandvikens IF
GK	(Sweden) Richard Andersson	Sandvikens IF
DF	(Sweden) Oskar Vejlo	Sandvikens IF
DF	(Sweden) Simon Strand	FC Väsby United
DF	(Sweden) Edward Owuso	Akropolis IF
DF	(Sweden) Jesper Manns	Eskilstuna City FK
DF	(Sweden) Jakob Björk	IK Sirius
MF / FW	(Sweden) Kevin Kabran	Vasalunds IF
MF / FW	(Sweden) Mahmoud Eid	Vasalunds IF
MF / FW	(Sweden) Andreas Östling	Västerås SK
MF / FW	(Sweden) Simon Johansson	Västerås SK
MF / FW	(Ghana) Thomas Boakye	Östersunds FK
MF / FW	(Sweden) Linus Sjöberg	Östersunds FK
MF / FW	(Sweden) David Yarar	FC Väsby United
MF / FW	(Sweden) Christian Kouakou	Akropolis IF
MF / FW	(Sweden) Filip Rogić	Eskilstuna City FK
Coach	(Poland) Bartosz Grzelak	IK Frej
Coach	(Sweden) Axel Kjäll	BK Forward

Södra Team
Position	Player	Club
GK	(Sweden) Martin Herlin	Skövde AIK
DF	(Sweden) Elon Keymer	Skövde AIK
DF	(Sweden) Andreas Uusitalo	Skövde AIK
DF	(Sweden) Pontus Johansson	FC Trollhättan
DF	(Sweden) Erik Berthagen	Utsiktens BK
MF / FW	(Sweden) Alfons Keymer	Skövde AIK
MF / FW	(Sweden) Bilos Yonakhir	Skövde AIK
MF / FW	(Sweden) Fisnik Mexhiqi	Skövde AIK
MF / FW	(Sweden) Agon Beqiri	FC Trollhättan
MF / FW	(Sweden) Jacob Lindström	Örgryte IS
MF / FW	(Sweden) Filip Holländer	Örgryte IS
MF / FW	(Sweden) Saman Ghoddos	IF Limhamn Bunkeflo
MF / FW	(Sweden) Pelle Ödlund	IK Gauthiod
MF / FW	(Sweden) Nicola Ladan	Qviding FIF
Coach	(Sweden) Rickard Söderberg	Skövde AIK
Coach	(Sweden) Jesper Ljung	FC Trollhättan

== See also ==
Competitions

- 2012 Allsvenskan
- 2012 Superettan
- 2012 Supercupen

Transfers

- List of Swedish football transfers winter 2011–2012
- List of Swedish football transfers summer 2012
