= 1941–42 Division 2 (Swedish football) =

Swedish League Division 2
- Season: 1941–42
- Champions: IK Brage; IFK Eskilstuna; Lundby IF; Halmstads BK
- Promoted: IFK Eskilstuna; Halmstads BK
- Relegated: Ljusne AIK; IFK Lidingö; IK City; Mjölby AIF; Karlstads BIK; Skara IF; Kalmar AIK; IFK Kristianstad

Statistics of Swedish football Division 2 for the 1941–42 season.

== League standings ==
=== Division 2 Norra 1941–42 ===
Teams from a large part of northern Sweden, approximately above the province of Medelpad, were not allowed to play in the national league system until the 1953–54 season, and a championship was instead played to decide the best team in Norrland.

Pos	Team	Pld	W	D	L	GF	GA	GD	Pts	Qualification or relegation
1	IK Brage	18	10	4	4	49	22	+27	24	Playoffs for promotion to Allsvenskan
2	Hammarby IF	18	9	6	3	55	35	+20	24	
3	Sandvikens AIK	18	10	2	6	39	25	+14	22	
4	Hofors AIF	18	7	4	7	31	37	−6	18	
5	Djurgårdens IF	18	6	4	8	27	26	+1	16	
6	Ludvika FfI	18	7	2	9	39	44	−5	16	
7	Sundbybergs IK	18	4	7	7	30	38	−8	15	
8	Gefle IF	18	4	7	7	33	43	−10	15	
9	Ljusne AIK	18	6	3	9	42	57	−15	15	Relegated to Division 3
10	IFK Lidingö	18	7	1	10	32	50	−18	15	Relegated to Division 3

=== Division 2 Östra 1941–42 ===
Pos	Team	Pld	W	D	L	GF	GA	GD	Pts	Qualification or relegation
1	IFK Eskilstuna	18	12	4	2	46	22	+24	28	Playoffs for promotion to Allsvenskan
2	Surahammars IF	18	10	3	5	31	23	+8	23	
3	IK Sleipner	18	9	4	5	38	24	+14	22	
4	Örebro SK	18	9	3	6	35	30	+5	21	
5	Hallstahammars SK	18	8	3	7	28	28	0	19	
6	Finspångs AIK	18	7	4	7	37	43	−6	18	
7	IFK Västerås	18	4	7	7	28	29	−1	15	
8	Åtvidabergs FF	18	5	5	8	30	33	−3	15	
9	IK City	18	5	5	8	23	29	−6	15	Relegated to Division 3
10	Mjölby AI	18	2	0	16	17	52	−35	4	Relegated to Division 3

=== Division 2 Västra 1941–42 ===
Pos	Team	Pld	W	D	L	GF	GA	GD	Pts	Qualification or relegation
1	Lundby IF	18	13	3	2	60	20	+40	29	Playoffs for promotion to Allsvenskan
2	Tidaholms GIF	18	12	2	4	50	35	+15	26	
3	Örgryte IS	18	7	7	4	36	28	+8	21	
4	Karlskoga IF	18	7	5	6	33	24	+9	19	
5	Billingsfors IK	18	9	1	8	40	36	+4	19	
6	Skogens IF	18	7	3	8	40	50	−10	17	
7	Waggeryds IK	18	5	6	7	43	52	−9	16	
8	Deje IK	18	5	3	10	30	45	−15	13	
9	Karlstads BIK	18	4	3	11	33	50	−17	11	Relegated to Division 3
10	Skara IF	18	3	3	12	22	47	−25	9	Relegated to Division 3

=== Division 2 Södra 1941–42 ===
Pos	Team	Pld	W	D	L	GF	GA	GD	Pts	Qualification or relegation
1	Halmstads BK	18	13	1	4	55	20	+35	27	Playoffs for promotion to Allsvenskan
2	IS Halmia	18	12	1	5	46	23	+23	25	
3	Höganäs BK	18	9	2	7	38	33	+5	20	
4	Nybro IF	18	9	1	8	39	37	+2	19	
5	BK Landora	18	7	2	9	42	42	0	16	
6	Olofströms IF	18	7	2	9	32	41	−9	16	
7	IFK Trelleborg	18	7	2	9	31	44	−13	16	
8	IFK Malmö	18	6	3	9	32	50	−18	15	
9	Kalmar AIK	18	6	2	10	38	51	−13	14	Relegated to Division 3
10	IFK Kristianstad	18	5	2	11	31	43	−12	12	Relegated to Division 3
