= 2012 Division 2 (Swedish football) =

Swedish League Division 2
- Season: 2012
- Champions: Selånger FK; Valsta Syrianska IK; Nyköpings BIS; Husqvarna FF; Torslanda IK; IS Halmia
- Promoted: 6 teams above
- Relegated: 12 teams

Statistics of Swedish football Division 2 for the 2012 season.

== League standings ==
=== Norrland 2012 ===
Pos	Team	Pld	W	D	L	GF	GA	GD	Pts	Promotion or relegation
1	Selånger FK	22	16	2	4	65	32	+33	50	Promotion to Division 1
2	Anundsjö IF	22	14	4	4	40	16	+24	46	
3	Härnösands FF	22	13	4	5	54	32	+22	43	
4	Mariehem SK	22	13	3	6	40	32	+8	42	
5	Bodens BK	22	11	5	6	47	22	+25	38	
6	Skellefteå FF	22	10	4	8	42	36	+6	34	
7	Morön BK	22	9	2	11	36	45	−9	29	
8	Assi IF	22	8	4	10	35	41	−6	28	
9	Piteå IF	22	6	6	10	28	36	−8	24	
10	Tegs SK	22	6	3	13	30	41	−11	21	Relegation playoffs to Division 3
11	Sollefteå GIF	22	3	5	14	33	65	−32	14	Relegation to Division 3
12	Umedalens IF	22	2	0	20	25	77	−52	6	Relegation to Division 3

=== Norra Svealand 2012 ===
Pos	Team	Pld	W	D	L	GF	GA	GD	Pts	Promotion or relegation
1	Valsta Syrianska IK	22	13	6	3	43	27	+16	45	Promotion to Division 1
2	Sollentuna United FF	22	10	6	6	49	36	+13	36	
3	Västerås IK	22	8	7	7	47	37	+10	31	
4	Karlbergs BK	22	8	6	8	36	35	+1	30	
5	Hudiksvalls FF	22	9	2	11	37	41	−4	29	
6	Spårvägens FF	22	8	5	9	32	38	−6	29	
7	Strömsbergs IF	22	7	7	8	40	37	+3	28	
8	Skiljebo SK	22	8	4	10	39	38	+1	28	
9	Gamla Upsala SK	22	8	4	10	35	35	0	28	
10	Rotebro IS	22	8	4	10	37	50	−13	28	Relegation playoffs to Division 3
11	Falu FK	22	8	3	11	41	50	−9	27	Relegation to Division 3
12	Nacka FF	22	7	6	9	28	40	−12	27	Relegation to Division 3

=== Södra Svealand 2012 ===
Pos	Team	Pld	W	D	L	GF	GA	GD	Pts	Promotion or relegation
1	Nyköpings BIS	22	17	1	4	58	22	+36	52	Promotion to Division 1
2	Carlstad United BK	21	13	3	5	46	28	+18	42	
3	Rynninge IK	22	11	5	6	43	31	+12	38	
4	Enskede IK	22	11	5	6	43	33	+10	38	
5	Värmbols FC	22	11	2	9	45	39	+6	35	
6	Värmdö IF	22	10	3	9	46	36	+10	33	
7	Arameiska/Syrianska	22	9	6	7	42	34	+8	33	
8	Karlslunds IF	22	8	6	8	31	34	−3	30	
9	FC Gute	22	5	6	11	29	45	−16	21	
10	Konyaspor KIF	22	5	6	11	24	46	−22	21	Relegation playoffs to Division 3
11	KB Karlskoga	22	5	4	13	27	51	−24	19	Relegation to Division 3
12	Eskilstuna Södra FF	22	2	3	17	23	58	−35	9	Relegation to Division 3

=== Östra Götaland 2012 ===
Pos	Team	Pld	W	D	L	GF	GA	GD	Pts	Promotion or relegation
1	Husqvarna FF	22	15	6	1	56	21	+35	51	Promotion to Division 1
2	Oskarshamns AIK	22	15	5	2	49	19	+30	50	
3	Lindsdals IF	22	13	6	3	52	27	+25	45	
4	Motala AIF	21	11	4	6	48	29	+19	37	
5	Karlskrona AIF	22	10	3	9	39	37	+2	33	
6	Tenhults IF	22	9	3	10	35	39	−4	30	
7	Ljungby IF	22	9	3	10	32	37	−5	30	
8	Vimmerby IF	22	8	4	10	29	33	−4	28	
9	Assyriska IF Norrköping	22	6	4	12	33	44	−11	22	
10	IK Tord	22	6	1	15	21	49	−28	19	Relegation playoffs to Division 3
11	IF Hagapojkarna	22	2	7	13	26	54	−28	13	Relegation to Division 3
12	Myresjö IF	22	3	4	15	25	56	−31	13	Relegation to Division 3

=== Västra Götaland 2012 ===
Pos	Team	Pld	W	D	L	GF	GA	GD	Pts	Promotion or relegation
1	Torslanda IK	22	13	7	2	41	17	+24	46	Promotion to Division 1
2	Assyriska BK	22	14	2	6	50	24	+26	44	
3	Lindome GIF	22	13	2	7	44	33	+11	41	
4	Fässbergs IF	22	10	2	10	48	43	+5	32	
5	IFK Uddevalla	22	9	3	10	42	47	−5	30	
6	Jonsereds IF	22	7	7	8	48	48	0	28	
7	Tibro AIK FK	22	8	4	10	39	45	−6	28	
8	Ytterby IS	22	7	5	10	31	36	−5	26	
9	Sävedalens IF	22	7	5	10	26	33	−7	26	
10	Götene IF	22	7	5	10	37	53	−16	26	Relegation playoffs to Division 3
11	Västra Frölunda IF	22	5	6	11	25	35	−10	21	Relegation to Division 3
12	Gunnilse IS	22	3	10	9	36	53	−17	19	Relegation to Division 3

=== Södra Götaland 2012 ===
Pos	Team	Pld	W	D	L	GF	GA	GD	Pts	Promotion or relegation
1	IS Halmia	22	16	3	3	67	20	+47	51	Promotion to Division 1
2	Tvååkers IF	22	16	3	3	59	20	+39	51	
3	Högaborgs BK	22	13	5	4	43	33	+10	44	
4	Torns IF	22	12	3	7	56	32	+24	39	
5	FC Rosengård	22	10	5	7	52	39	+13	35	
6	Eskilsminne IF	22	9	6	7	46	38	+8	33	
7	GIF Nike	22	8	4	10	34	38	−4	28	
8	Kvarnby IK	22	7	3	12	53	46	+7	24	
9	Ramlösa Södra FF	22	7	3	12	40	46	−6	24	
10	Sölvesborgs GoIF	22	7	2	13	33	48	−15	23	Relegation playoffs to Division 3
11	BK Olympic	22	5	6	11	37	43	−6	21	Relegation to Division 3
12	IFK Klagshamn	22	0	1	21	10	127	−117	1	Relegation to Division 3

== Player of the year awards ==
Ever since 2003 the online bookmaker Unibet have given out awards at the end of the season to the best players in Division 2. The recipients are decided by a jury of sportsjournalists, coaches and football experts. The names highlighted in green won the overall national award.

Norrland
Position	Player	Club
GK	(North Macedonia) Dejan Dimoski	Anundsjö IF
DF	(Sweden) Modou Saine	Anundsjö IF
MF	(Liberia) Sam Johnson	Härnösands FF
FW	(Sweden) Ahmad Khreis	Selånger FK

Norra Svealand
Position	Player	Club
GK	(Sweden) Gabriel Bulut	Valsta Syrianska IK
DF	(Sweden) Marcus De Bruin	Sollentuna United FF
MF	(Sweden) Pontus Silfver	Hudiksvalls FF
FW	(Sweden) Sencer Soguk	Valsta Syrianska IK

Södra Svealand
Position	Player	Club
GK	(Bosnia and Herzegovina) Mirhad Abdijanovic	Carlstad United BK
DF	(Sweden) Pontus Nordenberg	Nyköpings BIS
MF	(United States) Paul Torres	Nyköpings BIS
FW	(Sweden) Vedran Benca	Värmbols FC

Östra Götaland
Position	Player	Club
GK	(Sweden) Peter Jansson	Oskarshamns AIK
DF	(Sweden) Kristian Petersson	Karlskrona AIF
MF	(Sweden) Johan Karlefjärd	Husqvarna FF
FW	(Sweden) Peiman Eliassi	Oskarshamns AIK

Västra Götaland
Position	Player	Club
GK	(Sweden) David Stenman	Torslanda IK
DF	(Sweden) Fredrik Brändén	IFK Uddevalla
MF	(Sweden) Magnus Lagerin	Tibro AIK FK
FW	(Sweden) Robin Örtendahl	Torslanda IK

Södra Götaland
Position	Player	Club
GK	(Sweden) Jonas Käck	IS Halmia
DF	(Sweden) Marcus Rietz	Ramlösa Södra FF
MF	(Sweden) Labinot Syla	Tvååkers IF
FW	(Sweden) Calle Genberg	IS Halmia
