= Anton Andersson (footballer) =

Swedish footballer

Personal information
- Date of birth: September 15, 1987 (age 39)
- Place of birth: Luleå, Sweden
- Height: 1.86 m (6 ft 1 in)
- Position: Midfielder

Youth career
- Luleå SK

Senior career*
Years	Team	Apps	(Gls)
2005	Luleå SK	8	(1)
2006–2007	IFK Luleå	29	(16)
2008–2009	GIF Sundsvall	26	(1)
2010–2011	Bodens BK	51	(6)
2012–2018	IFK Luleå	157	(34)
2019	Harads IF	10	(1)
- * Club domestic league appearances and goals

Anton Andersson (born 15 September 1987) is a Swedish retired footballer.

== Career ==
He joined the Superettan team in December 2007, coming over from Division 2 outfit IFK Luleå. The offensive midfielder left after two years GIF Sundsvall and signed for Bodens BK.
