= Arkelstorp =

Locality in Sweden

- Location within Skåne Location within Sweden
- Coordinates: 56°10′N 14°17′E
- Country: Sweden
- Province: Skåne
- County: Skåne County
- Municipality: Kristianstad Municipality

Area
  - Total: 1.08 km^{2} (0.42 sq mi)

Population (31 December 2010)
  - Total: 768
  - Density: 714/km^{2} (1,850/sq mi)
- Time zone: UTC+1 (CET)
  - Summer (DST): UTC+2 (CEST)

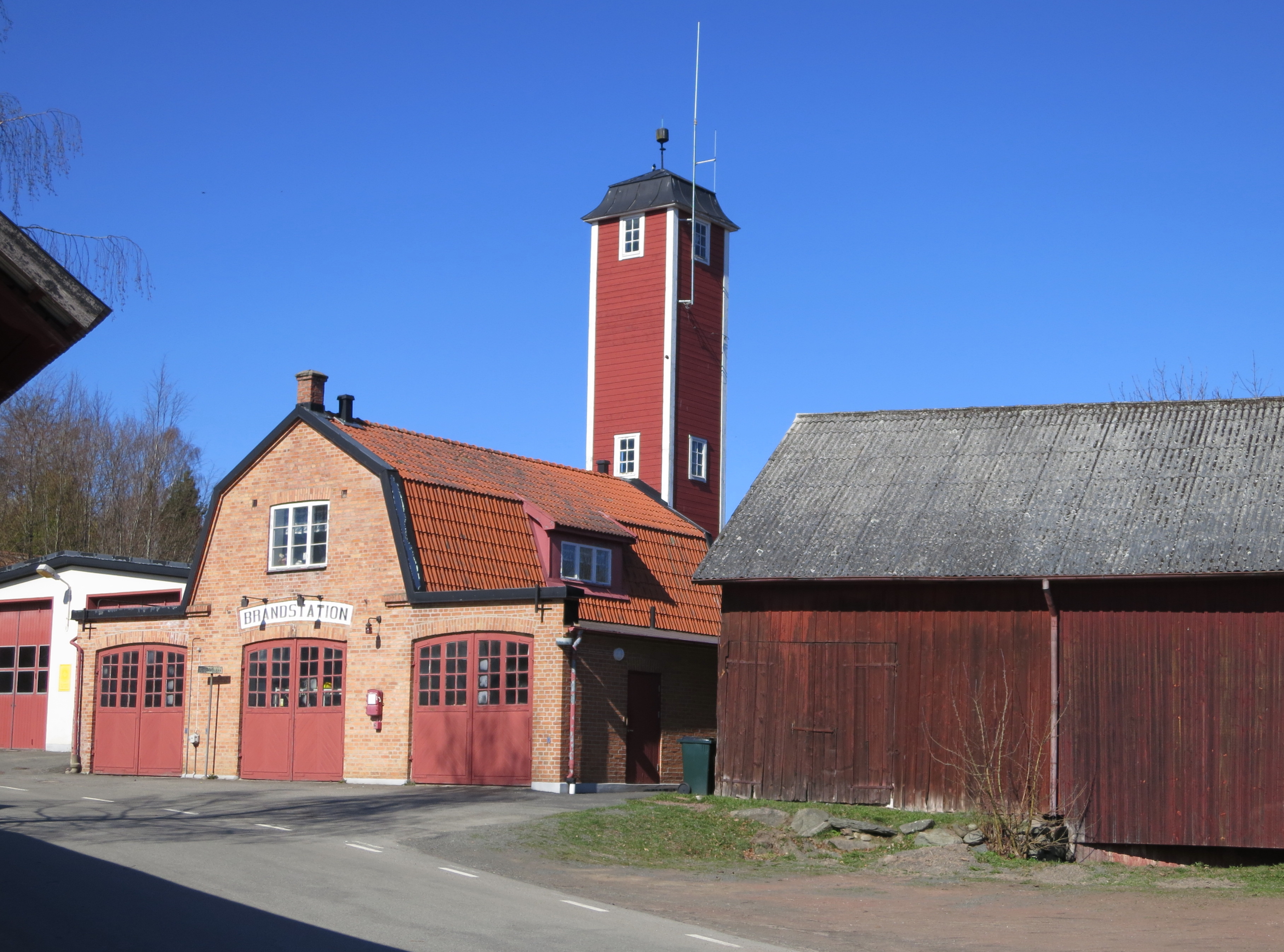
Arkelstorp fire station

Arkelstorp is a locality situated in Kristianstad Municipality, Skåne County, Sweden. At the end of 2010 it had 768 inhabitants. The name was written in the 1570s Archilstorp and is taken from the village on whose land the settlement grew after the opening of the railway station in 1885. The suffix is torp, 'new building'. The prefix contains the male name Arnketil.

== Sports ==
The following sports clubs are located in Arkelstorp:

- VMA IK

== Furniture ==
The following furniture pieces are included in the IKEA Arkelstorp Series:

- Desk (not available in all regions)
- Console Table (known in some regions as Window Table)
- Coffee Table
- Sideboard
