= Grästorp Municipality =

Grästorp Municipality Grästorps kommun
- Municipality
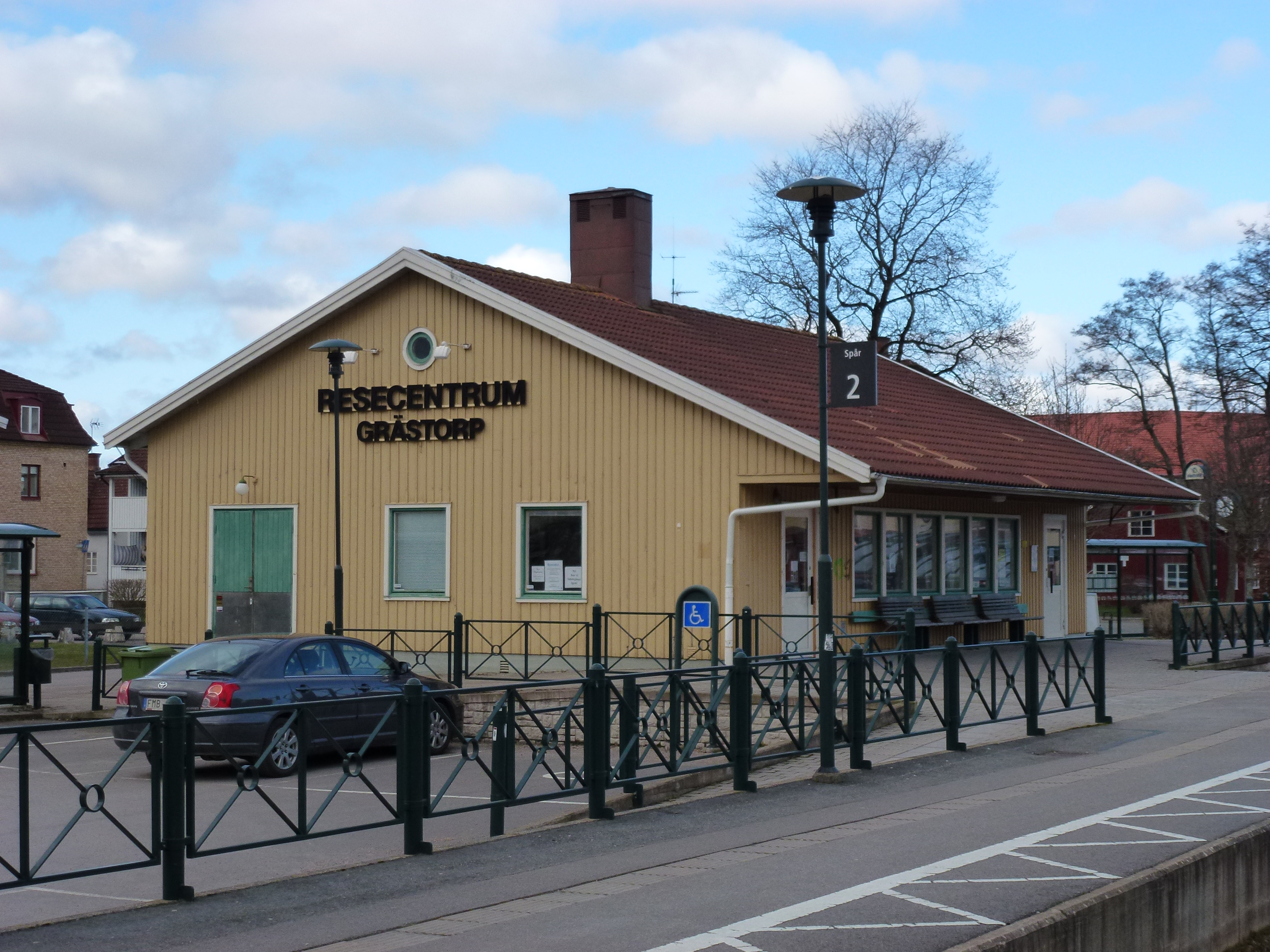
- Grästorp Railway Station

- Coat of arms

- Coordinates: 58°20′N 12°40′E
- Country: Sweden
- County: Västra Götaland County
- Seat: Grästorp

Area
  - Total: 280.66 km^{2} (108.36 sq mi)
  - Land: 264.68 km^{2} (102.19 sq mi)
  - Water: 15.98 km^{2} (6.17 sq mi)
- Area as of 1 January 2014.

Population (30 June 2025)
  - Total: 5,591
  - Density: 21.12/km^{2} (54.71/sq mi)
- Time zone: UTC+1 (CET)
  - Summer (DST): UTC+2 (CEST)
- ISO 3166 code: SE
- Province: Västergötland
- Municipal code: 1444
- Website: www.grastorp.se
- Density is calculated using land area only.

Grästorp Municipality (Swedish: Grästorps kommun) is a municipality in Västra Götaland County in western Sweden. Its seat is located in the town of Grästorp.

Grästorp Municipality is located right in the middle of Västra Götaland County, by the shores of Lake Vänern.

== History ==
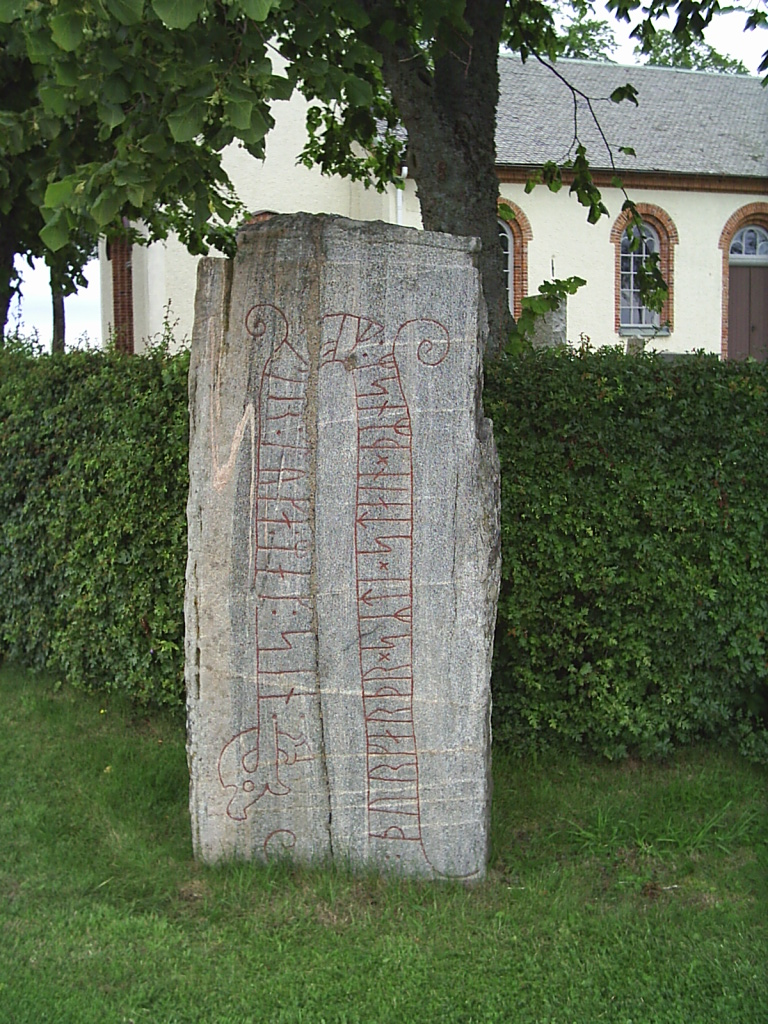
Runestone by Sal church

In the year 1900 the village Grästorp was detached from Tengene and made a market town (köping). The local government reform of 1952 amalgamated it with twelve surrounding municipalities (among them Tengene). The 1971 reform made the term köping obsolete, thus forming Grästorps kommun without amendment of territory.

The area has been inhabited at least since the Viking Age as it contains several runestones. The runestone at the church at Sal has an inscription that reads "Torgård satte denna sten efter Toke, sin frände", meaning "Torgård raised this stone for Toke, his kinsman".

== Localities ==
The seat Grästorp (pop. 3,000) is the only built-up locality with more than 200 inhabitants in this predominantly rural area.

== Demographics ==
This is a demographic table based on Grästorp Municipality's electoral districts in the 2022 Swedish general election sourced from SVT's election platform, in turn taken from SCB official statistics.

In total there were 5,727 residents, including 4,530 Swedish citizens of voting age. 39.2% voted for the left coalition and 59.5% for the right coalition. Indicators are in percentage points except population totals and income.

Location	Residents	Citizen adults	Left vote	Right vote	Employed	Swedish parents	Foreign heritage	Income SEK	Degree
Location			%	%					
Grästorp N	1,808	1,441	40.7	57.7	80	88	12	23,650	26
Grästorp rural	2,107	1,683	36.4	62.1	82	90	10	25,313	31
Grästorp S	1,812	1,406	42.4	57.0	89	93	7	25,858	38
Source: SVT
