= Bosko Orovic =

Swedish association football player

Personal information
- Full name: Christian Bosko Luka Orovic
- Date of birth: 13 July 1972 (age 54)
- Place of birth: Södertälje, Sweden
- Position: Forward

Team information
- Current team: Utsiktens BK (manager)

Youth career
- Lundby IF

Senior career*
Years	Team	Apps	(Gls)
–1992	Lundby IF		
1993–1994	BK Häcken	22	(5)
1995–1996	Västra Frölunda IF		

Managerial career
- 2012–2015: Qviding FIF
- 2016: Syrianska FC
- 2016: Gunnilse IS
- 2016–2017: Utsiktens BK
- 2017–2019: GAIS
- 2020–: Utsiktens BK
- * Club domestic league appearances and goals

Christian Bosko Luka Orovic (born 13 July 1972) is a Swedish football manager who is the current head coach of Swedish Superettan club Utsiktens BK. He is also a former professional footballer who played as a forward.

== Playing career ==
Orovic played as a forward in Allsvenskan with both BK Häcken and Västra Frölunda IF. While a youth player at Lundby IF, he was considered one of the most promising footballing youth prospects in the world. He retired from professional football in 1996, having sustained four serious knee injuries.

== Coaching career ==
Following his playing career, Orovic has managed clubs such as Qviding FIF, Syrianska FC, Gunnilse IS, Utsiktens BK, and GAIS. He is currently the manager of Utsiktens BK.
