= Syrianska IF Kerburan =

Association football club

Syrianska
- Full name: Syrianska Idrottsföreningen Kerburan
- Founded: 1977; 48 years ago
- Ground: Solid Park Arena, Västerås; Sweden
- Chairman: Zeki Can
- Coach: Peter Lenell
- League: Division 2 Norra Svealand
- 2012: Division 1 Norra, 12th (relegated)
Home colours	Away colours

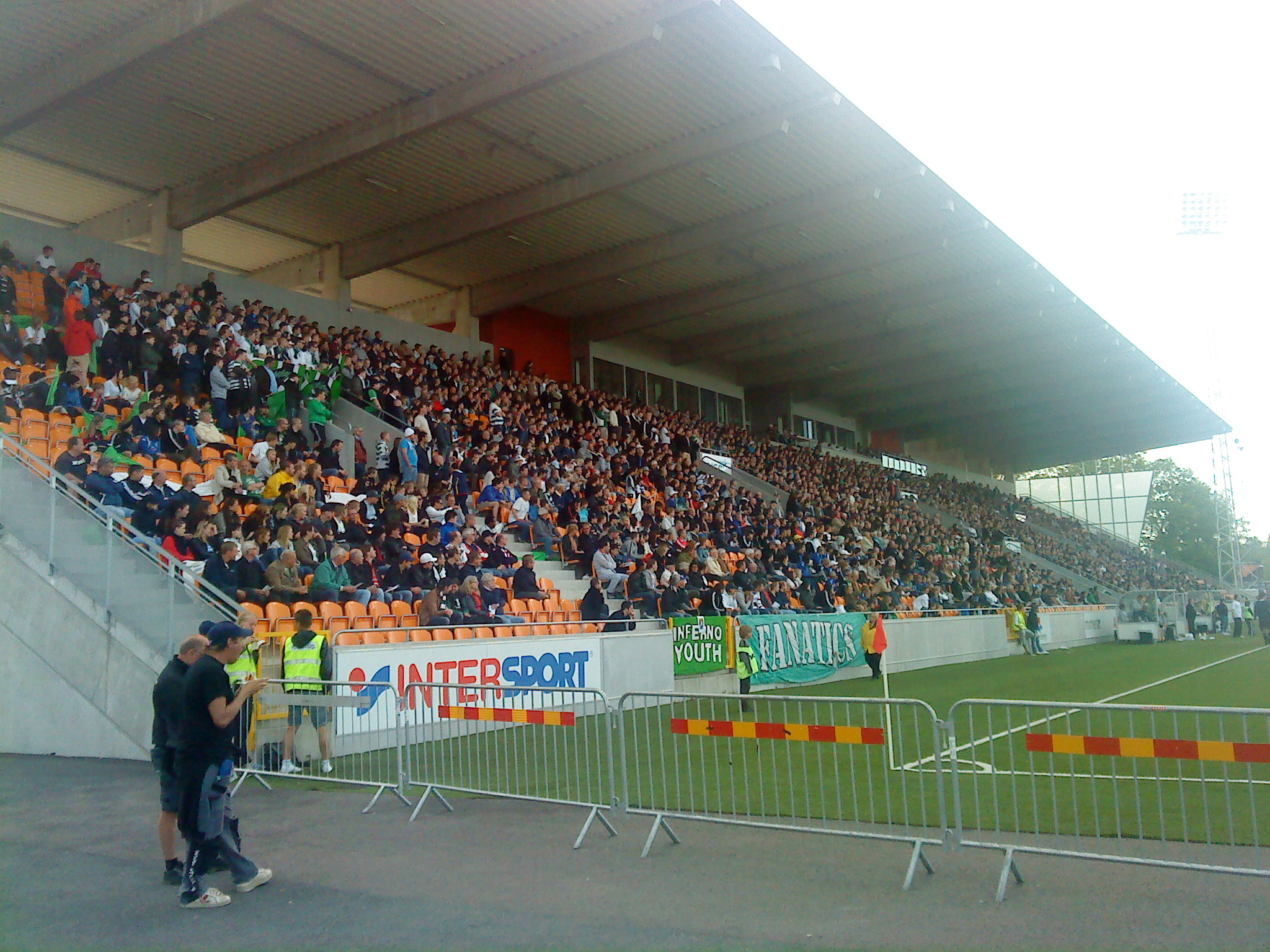
Swedbank Park

Syrianska IF Kerburan is a Swedish based football club in the city of Västerås. The club, formed in 1977 by Syriac-Aramean immigrants, has advanced through the league system and is currently playing in the fourth highest Swedish league, Division 2.

== History ==
Syrianska IF Kerburan was established in 1977. The first name on the club was Kerburan IF, because of the large Assyrian immigrants from the village of Kerburan, Turkey. The name was later changed to Syrianska IF Kerburan in 1993.

The club is affiliated to the Västmanlands Fotbollförbund.

== Current squad ==
As of 2 May 2015. Note: Flags indicate national team as defined under FIFA eligibility rules; some limited exceptions apply. Players may hold more than one non-FIFA nationality.

No.	Pos.	Nation	Player
1	GK	SWE	Housnein Agodomou
2	DF	SWE	Marcel Kaya
3	DF	PER	Gabriel Medina
4	DF	SWE	Jonas Kouao
5	DF	SWE	Rigest Hysko
6	DF	SWE	Dennis Persson
7	FW	SWE	Jonathan Bahar
9	MF	SWE	Allan Kosik
11	FW	SWE	Temesgen Berhane
14	MF	SWE	Alexander Persson-Njie
17	DF	SWE	David Hasler

No.	Pos.	Nation	Player
18	MF	SWE	Mattias Floren
19	MF	SWE	Lucas Özgun
21	DF	SWE	Markus Hanna
22	MF	SWE	Nathan Hands
23	MF	SWE	Kevin Sharro
28	MF	SWE	Taher Mahallatian
30	GK	SWE	Sebastian Karacan
77	MF	SWE	Robin Blomme
88	MF	SWE	Mikael Zaytoun
97	MF	SWE	Rodi Mahmoud
99	GK	PER	Michael Quintero

== Season to season ==
Season	Level	Division	Section	Position	Movements
2006*	Tier 4	Division 2	Norra Svealand	4th	
2007	Tier 4	Division 2	Norra Svealand	2nd	
2008	Tier 4	Division 2	Norra Svealand	1st	Promoted
2009	Tier 3	Division 1	Norra	10th	
2010	Tier 3	Division 1	Norra	3rd	
2011	Tier 3	Division 1	Norra	9th	
2012	Tier 3	Division 1	Norra	12th	Relegated
2013	Tier 4	Division 2	Norra Svealand		

* League restructuring in 2006 resulted in a new division being created at Tier 3 and subsequent divisions dropping a level.

== Attendances ==
In recent seasons Syrianska IF Kerburan have had the following average attendances:

Season	Average attendance	Division / Section	Level
2005	544	Div 2 Östra Svealand	Tier 3
2006	380	Div 2 Norra Svealand	Tier 4
2007	416	Div 2 Norra Svealand	Tier 4
2008	904	Div 2 Norra Svealand	Tier 4
2009	978	Div 1 Norra	Tier 3
2010	1,297	Div 1 Norra	Tier 3
2011	690	Div 1 Norra	Tier 3

* Attendances are provided in the Publikliga sections of the Svenska Fotbollförbundet website. |}

== See also ==
- List of Assyrian football teams in Sweden
