= Trängens IP =

Association football ground in Örebro

- Interactive map of Trängens IP
- Location: Karlsgatan 62, 703 41 Örebro, Sweden
- Coordinates: 59°16′44″N 15°11′13″E

Construction
- Opened: 1963

Tenant
- Bollklubben Forward

Trängens IP is a football stadium in Örebro, Sweden and the home stadium for the football team BK Forward. Trängens IP has a total capacity of 4,700 spectators. When BK played a qualification match to the second-highest division in Sweden, the match took place on Behrn Arena in front of 2,643 spectators.

The venue hosted the motorcycle speedway team known as Vikingarna, the track was around the outside of the football pitch. Vikingarna moved to a new venue in 1976.
