= BK Forward =

Swedish football club

- Full name: Bollklubben Forward
- Founded: 1934
- Ground: Trängens IP, Örebro
- Chairman: Mats Eriksson
- Manager: Peder Hessel
- League: Div 2 Norra Götaland
- 2023: Div 2 Norra Götaland, 8th of 14
Home colours

Bollklubben Forward, commonly known as BK Forward, is a football team from Örebro, Sweden. They play in Div 2 Norra Götaland. The club plays in a small multipurpose stadium called Trängens IP. The base of the club is in the western end of downtown, whereas the city's historically main club Örebro SK play in the eastern end. The club is affiliated to the Örebro Läns Fotbollförbund.

The club is well known for its youth system, having created players like Jimmy Durmaz, Jiloan Hamad and Jacob Rinne.

The club has also had some success playing bandy, playing in the top Swedish series in 1973/74.

== Season to season ==
Season	Level	Division	Section	Position	Movements
1996	Tier 2	Division 1	Norra	13th	Relegated
1997	Tier 3	Division 2	Västra Svealand	9th	
1998	Tier 3	Division 2	Västra Svealand	3rd	
1999	Tier 3	Division 2	Västra Svealand	2nd	
2000	Tier 3	Division 2	Västra Svealand	1st	
2001	Tier 3	Division 2	Västra Svealand	2nd	
2002	Tier 3	Division 2	Västra Svealand	1st	Promoted
2003	Tier 2	Superettan		15th	Relegated
2004	Tier 3	Division 2	Västra Svealand	3rd	
2005	Tier 3	Division 2	Norra Svealand	3rd	Promoted
2006*	Tier 3	Division 1	Norra	9th	
2007	Tier 3	Division 1	Norra	5th	
2008	Tier 3	Division 1	Norra	7th	
2009	Tier 3	Division 1	Norra	9th	
2010	Tier 3	Division 1	Norra	11th	
2011	Tier 3	Division 1	Norra	5th	
2012	Tier 3	Division 1	Norra	2nd	Promotion Playoffs
2013	Tier 3	Division 1	Norra	4th	
2014	Tier 3	Division 1	Norra	6th	
2015	Tier 3	Division 1	Norra	4th	
2016	Tier 3	Division 1	Norra	12th	Relegated
2017	Tier 4	Division 2	Norra Svealand	1st	Promoted
2018	Tier 3	Division 1	Norra	8th	
2019	Tier 3	Division 1	Norra	16th	Relegated
2020	Tier 4	Division 2	Södra Svealand	3rd	
2021	Tier 4	Division 2	Norra Götaland	2nd	Promotion Playoffs
2022	Tier 3	Division 1	Norra	15th	Relegated
2023	Tier 4	Division 2	Norra Götaland	8th	
2024	Tier 4	Division 2	Norra Götaland	10th	

* League restructuring in 2006 resulted in a new division being created at Tier 3 and subsequent divisions dropping a level.

== Attendances ==
In recent seasons BK Forward have had the following average attendances:

Season	Average attendance	Division / Section	Level
2005	275	Div 2 Norra Svealand	Tier 3
2006	286	Div 1 Norra	Tier 3
2007	351	Div 1 Norra	Tier 3
2008	332	Div 1 Norra	Tier 3
2009	340	Div 1 Norra	Tier 3
2010	268	Div 1 Norra	Tier 3
2011	329	Div 1 Norra	Tier 3
2012	530	Div 1 Norra	Tier 3
2013	313	Div 1 Norra	Tier 3
2014	158	Div 1 Norra	Tier 3
2015	202	Div 1 Norra	Tier 3
2016	194	Div 1 Norra	Tier 3
2017	231	Div 2 Norra Svealand	Tier 4
2018	254	Div 1 Norra	Tier 3
2019	226	Ettan Norra	Tier 3
2020	0	Div 2 Södra Svealand	Tier 4
2021	?	Div 2 Norra Götaland	Tier 4

* Attendances are provided in the Publikliga sections of the Svenska Fotbollförbundet website.

== Achievements ==
=== League ===
- Division 1 Norra:
  - Runners-up (1): 2012
