= Lunnevi IP =

Football stadium in Grästorp, Sweden

Coordinates: 58°19′47″N 12°40′58″E

Lunnevi IP is a football stadium in Grästorp, Sweden and the home stadium for the football team IK Gauthiod. Lunnevi IP has a total capacity of 1,500 spectators.
