= VMA IK =

Swedish football club

- Full name: Vånga Mjönäs Arkelstorp Idrottsklubb
- Founded: 2002
- Ground: Arkelstorps IP, Arkelstorp and Ädlavallen, Vånga; Sweden
- Capacity: 1,000
- Chairman: Nils Ekvall
- Head coach: Fredrik Johansson
- Coach: Ola Lundin
- League: Division 2 Södra Götaland
- 2010: Division 2 Östra Götaland, 7th
Home colours

VMA IK is a Swedish football club located in Arkelstorp in Kristianstad Municipality, Skåne County.

== Background ==
VMA IK is derived from the three villages Vånga, Mjönäs and Arkelstorp in Kristianstad Municipality. The club currently has around 400 members and specialises in both football and table tennis.

Football is played in all three villages. Senior football is concentrated in Vånga during the spring season and Arkelstorp in the autumn season. Some of the youth teams play in Mjönes.

Key dates in the development of football in the community are as follows:

- 1932: Arkelstorps IF, Mjönäs IF and Vånga IK are formed as separate clubs.
- 1949: Mjönäs IF change their name to Mjönäs IK.
- 1991: Cooperation on the youth side is started under the name of Spänger 91.
- 1992: Vånga IK and Mjönäs IK merge to form Vånga/Mjönäs IK.
- 2000: Vånga/Mjönäs IK and Arkelstorps IF share their B team.
- 2001: Vånga/Mjönäs IK and Arkelstorps IF share their A team successfully.
- 2002: VMA IK is formed and all operations are conducted now in joint association.
- 2003: In two seasons VMA have advanced from Division 5 and play in 2003 in Division 3.
- 2004: VMA win their Division 3 section and are promoted to Division 2 for the first time.
- 2005: Relegated from Division 2.
- 2009: Win their Division 3 section and are promoted to Division 2 again.

Since their foundation in 2002 VMA IK has participated mainly in the middle divisions of the Swedish football league system. The club currently plays in Division 2 Östra Götaland which is the fourth tier of Swedish football. They play their home matches at the Arkelstorps IP in Arkelstorp and Ädlavallen in Vånga.

VMA IK are affiliated to the Skånes Fotbollförbund.

== Season to season ==
| Season | Level | Division | Section | Position | Movements |
|---|---|---|---|---|---|
| 2002 | Tier 5 | Division 4 | Skåne Norra | 1st | Promoted |
| 2003 | Tier 4 | Division 3 | Sydvästra Götaland | 4th | |
| 2004 | Tier 4 | Division 3 | Sydvästra Götaland | 1st | Promoted |
| 2005 | Tier 3 | Division 2 | Södra Götaland | 12th | Relegated |
| 2006* | Tier 5 | Division 3 | Sydöstra Götaland | 8th | |
| 2007 | Tier 5 | Division 3 | Sydöstra Götaland | 6th | |
| 2008 | Tier 5 | Division 3 | Sydöstra Götaland | 5th | |
| 2009 | Tier 5 | Division 3 | Sydöstra Götaland | 1st | Promoted |
| 2010 | Tier 4 | Division 2 | Östra Götaland | 7th | |
| 2011 | Tier 4 | Division 2 | Södra Götaland | 11th | Relegated |

* League restructuring in 2006 resulted in a new division being created at Tier 3 and subsequent divisions dropping a level.

== Attendances ==
In recent seasons VMA IK have had the following average attendances:

| Season | Average attendance | Division / Section | Level |
|---|---|---|---|
| 2005 | 338 | Div 2 Södra Götaland | Tier 3 |
| 2006 | 150 | Div 3 Sydöstra Götaland | Tier 5 |
| 2007 | 198 | Div 3 Sydöstra Götalandd | Tier 5 |
| 2008 | 231 | Div 3 Sydöstra Götaland | Tier 5 |
| 2009 | 178 | Div 3 Sydöstra Götaland | Tier 5 |
| 2010 | 161 | Div 2 Östra Götaland | Tier 4 |

* Attendances are provided in the Publikliga sections of the Svenska Fotbollförbundet website.
