= Grästorp =

Grästorp, Sweden
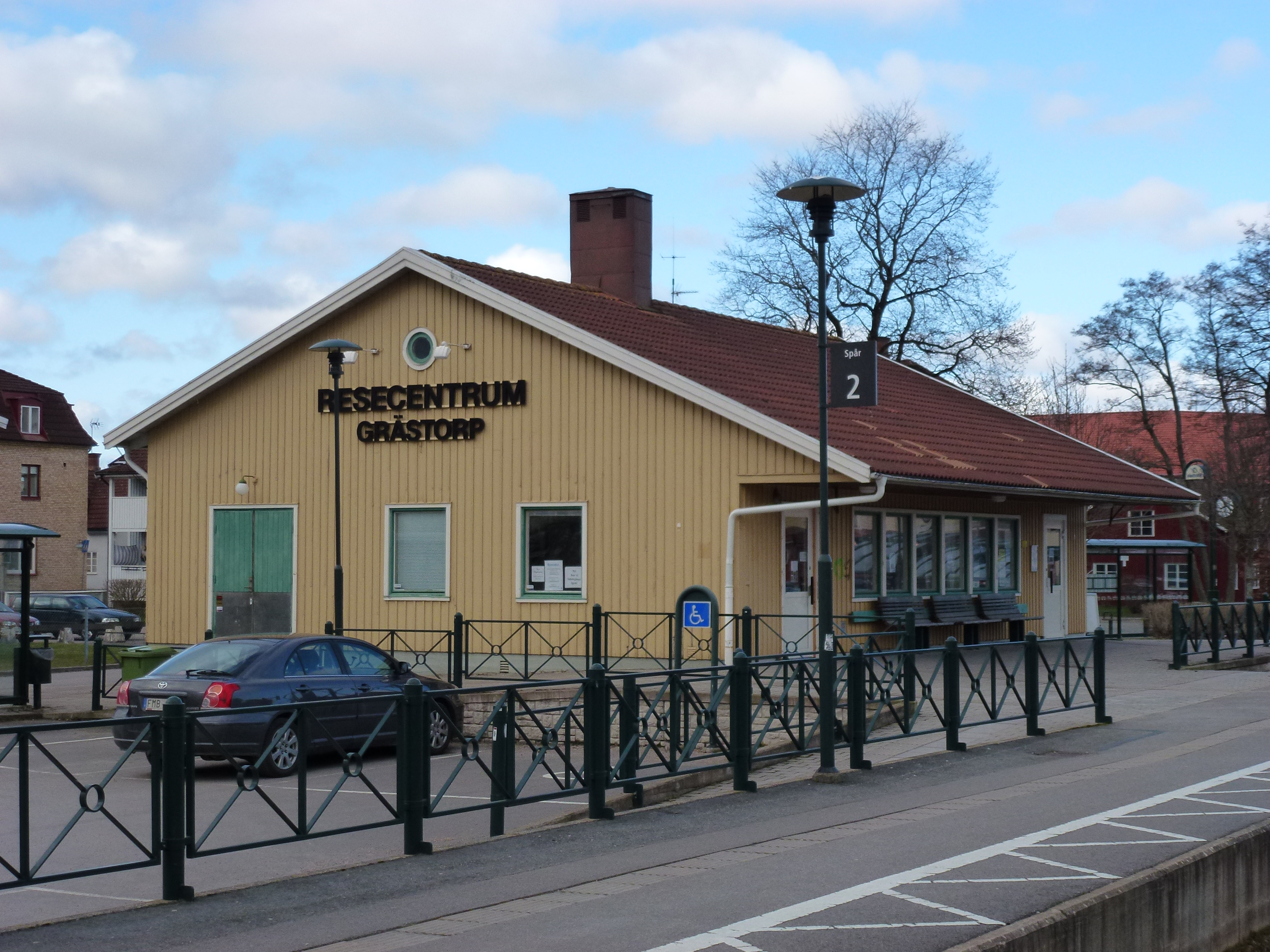
- Grästorp Train Station

- Location within Västra Götaland Location within Sweden
- Coordinates: 58°19′55″N 12°40′52″E
- Country: Sweden
- Province: Västergötland
- County: Västra Götaland County
- Municipality: Grästorp Municipality

Area
  - Total: 2.25 km^{2} (0.87 sq mi)

Population (31 December 2010)
  - Total: 2,969
  - Density: 1,321/km^{2} (3,420/sq mi)
- Time zone: UTC+1 (CET)
  - Summer (DST): UTC+2 (CEST)

Grästorp is a locality and the seat of Grästorp Municipality in Västra Götaland County, Sweden. It had 2,969 inhabitants in 2010. It is the only locality in Grästorp Municipality.

== Sports ==
The following sports clubs are located in Grästorp:

- IK Gauthiod
- Grästorps IK
