= IFK Luleå =

Association football club in Sweden

- Full name: Idrottsföreningen; Kamraterna Luleå
- Founded: 20 September 1900; 124 years ago
- Ground: Skogsvallen; Luleå; Sweden
- Capacity: 5,000
- Coach: Ben Hanley
- League: Division 1
- 2022: D2 Norrland, 3rd of 14
- Website: www.ifklulea.se
Home colours	Away colours

IFK Luleå is a Swedish professional football club formed in 1900, located in Luleå. The club merged with Luleå FF and played under the name Luleå FF/IFK from 1986 to 1989.

== History ==
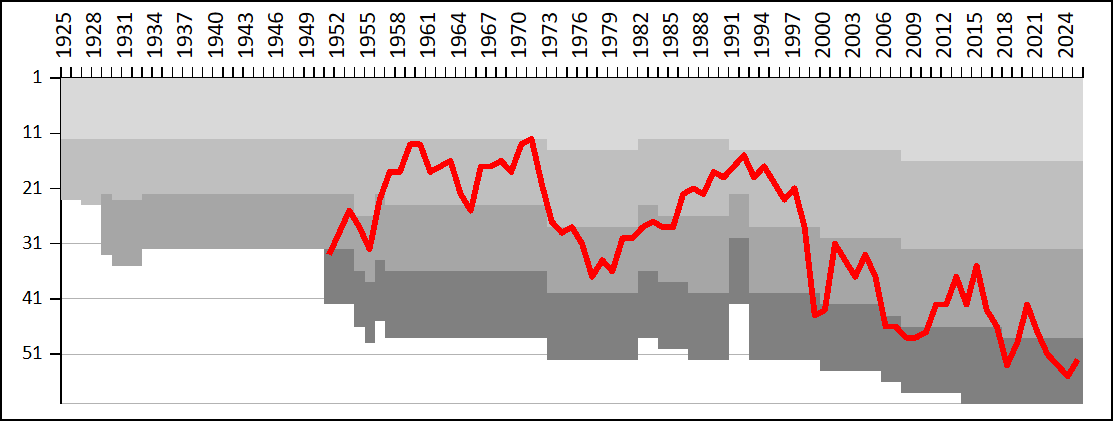
A chart showing the progress of IFK Luleå through the swedish football league system. The different shades of gray represent league divisions.

IFK Luleå was originally founded in the year 1900, but went dormant after some years. In 1920, the sports club IK Gyltzau won the Norrbotten district championship in bandy and this club was then renamed as a revived IFK Luleå, which continued to play bandy for many years. In 1932 and 1934 the bandy district championship was won again, now under the IFK name.

IFK Luleå played one season in the Allsvenskan in 1971, the top-tier of Swedish football, but after a promising start their stay was short-lived as they were relegated at the end of the season. In the late 1980s and most of the 1990s the club enjoyed their heyday by playing in Division 1 Norra, which at that time was the second tier of Swedish football. Over the last decade IFK Luleå have been competing in the Division 2 Norrland which is now the fourth tier of the Swedish football league system. For 4 consecutive seasons between 2006 and 2009 they have experienced the frustration of finishing in second position and consequently missing out on promotion.

In 2010 under new coach Fredrik Waara did they finally finish in first place and receive promotion to Division 1 Norra where they finished in tenth place during the next two seasons.

The club is affiliated to the Norrbottens Fotbollförbund.

== Season to season ==
Season	Level	Division	Section	Position	Movements
1993	Tier 2	Division 1	Norra	5th	
1994	Tier 2	Division 1	Norra	3rd	
1995	Tier 2	Division 1	Norra	6th	
1996	Tier 2	Division 1	Norra	9th	
1997	Tier 2	Division 1	Norra	7th	
1998	Tier 2	Division 1	Norra	14th	Relegated
1999	Tier 4	Division 3	Norra Norrland	4th	
2000	Tier 4	Division 3	Norra Norrland	1st	Promotion play-offs
2001	Tier 3	Division 2	Norrland	1st	Promotion play-offs
2002	Tier 3	Division 2	Norrland	4th	
2003	Tier 3	Division 2	Norrland	7th	
2004	Tier 3	Division 2	Norrland	3rd	
2005	Tier 3	Division 2	Norrland	7th	
2006*	Tier 4	Division 2	Norrland	2nd	
2007	Tier 4	Division 2	Norrland	2nd	
2008	Tier 4	Division 2	Norrland	2nd	
2009	Tier 4	Division 2	Norrland	2nd	
2010	Tier 4	Division 2	Norrland	1st	Promoted
2011	Tier 3	Division 1	Norra	10th	
2012	Tier 3	Division 1	Norra	10th	
2013	Tier 3	Division 1	Norra	5th	
2014	Tier 3	Division 1	Norra	10th	
2015	Tier 3	Division 1	Norra	3rd	
2016	Tier 3	Division 1	Norra	11th	Relegation play-offs
2017	Tier 3	Division 1	Norra	14th	Relegated
2018	Tier 4	Division 2	Norrland	5th	
2019	Tier 4	Division 2	Norrland	1st	Promoted
2020	Tier 3	Division 1	Norra		

* League restructuring in 2006 resulted in a new division being created at tier 3 and subsequent divisions dropping a level.

== Current squad ==
Note: Flags indicate national team as defined under FIFA eligibility rules; some limited exceptions apply. Players may hold more than one non-FIFA nationality.

No.	Pos.	Nation	Player
—	FW	(South Sudan) SSD	David Majak

== Attendances ==
In recent seasons IFK Luleå have had the following average attendances:

Season	Average attendance	Division/section	Level
2005	362	Div 2 Norrland	Tier 3
2006	336	Div 2 Norrland	Tier 4
2007	487	Div 2 Norrland	Tier 4
2008	280	Div 2 Norrland	Tier 4
2009	699	Div 2 Norrland	Tier 4
2010	485	Div 2 Norrland	Tier 4
2011	866	Div 1 Norra	Tier 3
2012	441	Div 1 Norra	Tier 3
2013	560	Div 1 Norra	Tier 3
2014	432	Div 1 Norra	Tier 3
2015	774	Div 1 Norra	Tier 3
2016	616	Div 1 Norra	Tier 3
2017	427	Div 1 Norra	Tier 3
2018	?	Div 2 Norrland	Tier 4
2019	?	Div 2 Norrland	Tier 4
2020		Div 1 Norra	Tier 3

* Attendances are provided in the Publikliga sections of the Svenska Fotbollförbundet website.

== Achievements ==
=== League ===
- Division 1 Norra
  - Runners-up (2): 1991, 1992
