= Karlstad BK =

- Full name: Karlstad Bollklubb
- Nickname: KBK
- Founded: 1923
- Dissolved: 2019
- Ground: Våxnäs IP, Karlstad; Tingvalla IP, Karlstad
- Capacity: 10,000 – Tingvalla IP
Home colours	Away colours

Karlstad BK was a Swedish football club located in Karlstad, Värmland County. The club was affiliated to the Värmlands Fotbollförbund. They played their home matches at the Våxnäs IP and Tingvalla IP in Karlstad.

== History ==
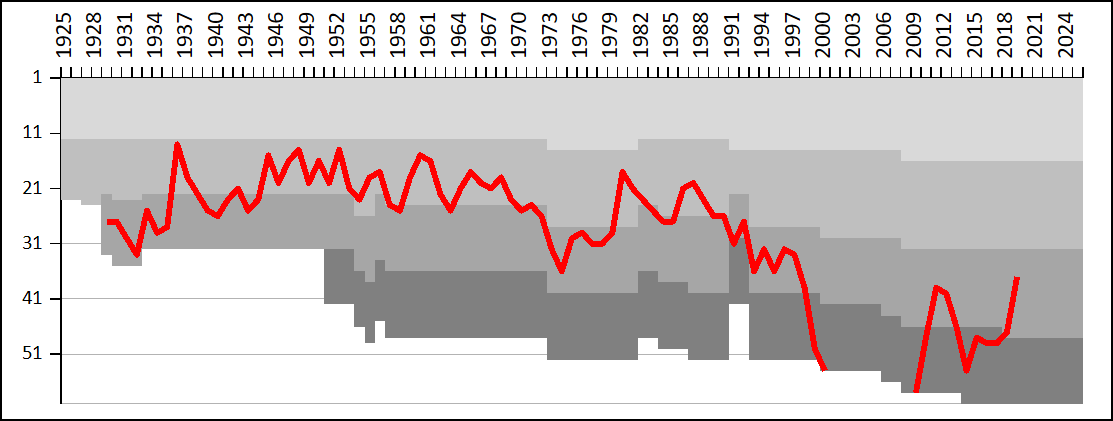
A chart showing the progress of Karlstad BK through the swedish football league system. The different shades of gray represent league divisions.

Since their foundation on 19 October 1923, Karlstad BK has participated mainly in the second and third tiers of the Swedish football league system. In 1934, the club merged with Karlstads IK to form Karlstads BIK, which lasted until 1963.

From 2000 to 2007, Karlstad BK was playing in Division 4 Värmland which was the fifth tier and then the sixth tier from 2006. Promotions in 2007 and again in 2009 have enabled the club to restore some pride, especially as they pipped local rivals FBK Karlstad to the play-off spot. From 2011 to 2013, and then in 2019, the club played in Division 1 Södra, the third tier of Swedish football.

They merged with Carlstad United after the 2019 season to form IF Karlstad Fotboll.

== Season to season ==
Season	Level	Division	Section	Position	Movements
1925–26		Alliansserien	Värmland		
1926–27		Alliansserien	Värmland		
1927–28		Alliansserien	Värmland		
1928–29	Tier 3	Division 3	Nordvästra	5th	
1929–30	Tier 3	Division 3	Nordvästra	4th	
1930–31	Tier 3	Division 3	Nordvästra	7th	
1931–32	Tier 3	Division 3	Nordvästra	10th	
1932–33	Tier 3	Division 3	Nordvästra	3rd	
1933–34	Tier 3	Division 3	Nordvästra	7th	
1934–35	Tier 3	Division 3	Nordvästra	6th	
1935–36	Tier 3	Division 3	Nordvästra	1st	Promoted
1936–37	Tier 2	Division 2	Västra	7th	
1937–38	Tier 2	Division 2	Västra	10th	Relegated
1938–39	Tier 3	Division 3	Nordvästra	3rd	
1939–40	Tier 3	Division 3	Nordvästra	4th	
1940–41	Tier 3	Division 3	Nordvästra Norra	1st	Promoted
1941–42	Tier 2	Division 2	Västra	9th	Relegated
1942–43	Tier 3	Division 3	Nordvästra Norra	3rd	
1943–44	Tier 3	Division 3	Nordvästra Norra	1st	Promoted
1944–45	Tier 2	Division 2	Västra	3rd	
1945–46	Tier 2	Division 2	Västra	8th	
1946–47	Tier 2	Division 2	Västra	4th	
1947–48	Tier 2	Division 2	Nordöstra	2nd	
1948–49	Tier 2	Division 2	Sydvästra	8th	
1949–50	Tier 2	Division 2	Nordöstra	4th	
1950–51	Tier 2	Division 2	Nordöstra	8th	
1951–52	Tier 2	Division 2	Nordöstra	2nd	
1952–53	Tier 2	Division 2	Nordöstra	9th	Relegated
1953–54	Tier 3	Division 3	Västra Svealand	1st	Promoted
1954–55	Tier 2	Division 2	Svealand	7th	
1955–56	Tier 2	Division 2	Svealand	6th	
1956–57	Tier 2	Division 2	Svealand	12th	Relegated
1957–58	Tier 3	Division 3	Västra Svealand	1st	Promoted
1959	Tier 2	Division 2	Svealand	7th	
1960	Tier 2	Division 2	Svealand	3rd	
1961	Tier 2	Division 2	Svealand	4th	
1962	Tier 2	Division 2	Svealand	10th	Relegated
1963	Tier 3	Division 3	Östra Svealand	1st	Promoted
1964	Tier 2	Division 2	Svealand	9th	
1965	Tier 2	Division 2	Svealand	6th	
1966	Tier 2	Division 2	Svealand	8th	
1967	Tier 2	Division 2	Svealand	9th	
1968	Tier 2	Division 2	Norra Götaland	7th	
1969	Tier 2	Division 2	Norra Götaland	11th	Relegated
1970	Tier 3	Division 3	Västra Svealand	1st	Promoted
1971	Tier 2	Division 2	Norra Götaland	12th	Relegated
1972	Tier 3	Division 3	Västra Svealand	2nd	
1973	Tier 3	Division 3	Nordvästra Götaland	4th	
1974	Tier 3	Division 3	Västra Svealand	8th	
1975	Tier 3	Division 3	Västra Svealand	2nd	
1976	Tier 3	Division 3	Västra Svealand	1st	Promotion Playoff
1977	Tier 3	Division 3	Västra Svealand	3rd	
1978	Tier 3	Division 3	Västra Svealand	3rd	
1979	Tier 3	Division 3	Västra Svealand	1st	Promotion Playoff – Promoted
1980	Tier 2	Division 2	Norra	4th	
1981	Tier 2	Division 2	Norra	7th	
1982	Tier 2	Division 2	Norra	11th	Relegation Playoff – Relegated
1983	Tier 3	Division 3	Västra Svealand	2nd	
1984	Tier 3	Division 3	Västra Svealand	1st	Promotion Playoff
1985	Tier 3	Division 3	Västra Svealand	1st	Promotion Playoff – Promoted
1986	Tier 2	Division 2	Södra	9th	
1987	Tier 2	Division 1	Norra	8th	
1988	Tier 2	Division 1	Norra	11th	
1989	Tier 2	Division 1	Norra	14th	Relegated
1990	Tier 3	Division 2	Västra	14th	Relegated
1991	Tier 4	Division 3	Västra Svealand	1st	Promoted
1992	Tier 3	Division 2	Mellersta Svealand	7th	Spring Competition
	Tier 3	Division 2	Västra Svealand	5th	Autumn Competition
1993	Tier 3	Division 2	Västra Svealand	8th	
1994	Tier 3	Division 2	Västra Svealand	4th	
1995	Tier 3	Division 2	Västra Svealand	8th	
1996	Tier 3	Division 2	Västra Svealand	4th	
1997	Tier 3	Division 2	Västra Svealand	5th	
1998	Tier 3	Division 2	Västra Svealand	11th	Relegated
1999	Tier 4	Division 3	Västra Svealand	10th	Relegated
2000	Tier 5	Division 4	Värmland	3rd	
2001	Tier 5	Division 4	Värmland	8th	
2002	Tier 5	Division 4	Värmland	9th	
2003	Tier 5	Division 4	Värmland	5th	
2004	Tier 5	Division 4	Värmland	5th	
2005	Tier 5	Division 4	Värmland	8th	
2006*	Tier 6	Division 4	Värmland	6th	
2007	Tier 6	Division 4	Värmland	1st	Promoted
2008	Tier 5	Division 3	Västra Svealand	2nd	Promotion Playoff
2009	Tier 5	Division 3	Västra Svealand	2nd	Promotion Playoff – Promoted
2010	Tier 4	Division 2	Västra Götaland	2nd	Promoted
2011	Tier 3	Division 1	Norra	7th	
2012	Tier 3	Division 1	Södra	8th	
2013	Tier 3	Division 1	Södra	14th	Relegated
2014	Tier 4	Division 2	Norra Götaland	8th	
2015	Tier 4	Division 2	Norra Götaland	2nd	
2016	Tier 4	Division 2	Norra Götaland	5th	
2017	Tier 4	Division 2	Norra Götaland	3rd	
2018	Tier 4	Division 2	Norra Götaland	1st	Promoted
2019	Tier 3	Division 1	Norra	5th	

* League restructuring in 2006 resulted in a new division being created at Tier 3 and subsequent divisions dropping a level.

== Attendances ==
In recent seasons Karlstad BK have had the following average attendances:

Season	Average attendance	Division / Section	Level
2008	155	Div 3 Västra Svealand	Tier 5
2009	220	Div 3 Västra Svealand	Tier 5
2010	298	Div 2 Västra Götaland	Tier 4
2011	408	Div 1 Norra	Tier 3
2012	316	Div 1 Södra	Tier 3
2013	247	Div 1 Södra	Tier 3
2014	285	Div 2 Norra Götaland	Tier 3
2015	?	Div 2 Norra Götaland	Tier 3
2016	224	Div 2 Norra Götaland	Tier 3
2017	280	Div 2 Norra Götaland	Tier 3
2018	?	Div 2 Norra Götaland	Tier 3

* Attendances are provided in the Publikliga sections of the Svenska Fotbollförbundet website.
