= IK Gauthiod =

Swedish football club

- Full name: Idrottsklubben Gauthiod
- Founded: 1924
- Ground: Lunnevi IP; Grästorp; Sweden
- Capacity: 1,500
- Chairman: Lars Emanuelsson
- Head coach: Sverker Andersson
- League: Division 2 Norra Götaland
- 2019: Division 2 Norra Götaland, 4th
Home colours

IK Gauthiod is a Swedish football club located in Grästorp in Västra Götaland County.

== Background ==
Since their foundation on 30 July 1924 IK Gauthiod has participated mainly in the lower divisions of the Swedish football league system. The club currently (2016) plays in Division 2 which is the fourth tier of Swedish football. They play their home matches at the Lunnevi 1 in Grästorp.

The club is affiliated to the Västergötlands Fotbollförbund.

== Season to season ==
Season	Level	Division	Section	Position	Movements
1999	Tier 6	Division 5	Västra Skaraborg	1st	Promoted
2000	Tier 5	Division 4	Västergötland Västra	9th	
2001	Tier 5	Division 4	Västergötland Västra	2nd	Promotion Playoffs
2002	Tier 5	Division 4	Västergötland Västra	10th	Relegation Playoffs
2003	Tier 5	Division 4	Västergötland Västra	3rd	
2004	Tier 5	Division 4	Västergötland Västra	3rd	
2005	Tier 5	Division 4	Västergötland Västra	1st	Promoted
2006*	Tier 5	Division 3	Mellersta Götaland	2nd	Promotion Playoffs
2007	Tier 5	Division 3	Mellersta Götaland	6th	
2008	Tier 5	Division 3	Mellersta Götaland	1st	Promoted
2009	Tier 4	Division 2	Östra Götaland	7th	
2010	Tier 4	Division 2	Västra Götaland	8th	
2011	Tier 4	Division 2	Norra Götaland	1st	Promoted
2012	Tier 3	Division 1	Södra	14th	Relegated
2013	Tier 4	Division 2	Norra Götaland		

* League restructuring in 2006 resulted in a new division being created at Tier 3 and subsequent divisions dropping a level.
