= Assyriska BK =

Swedish football club

- Full name: Assyriska Bollklubb
- Nickname(s): ABK
- Founded: 1985; 40 years ago
- Ground: Ruddalens IP; Västra Frölunda, Gothenburg
- Capacity: 5,000
- Chairman: Engin Aslan
- Manager: Ahrun Çiçek
- League: Division 2 Västra Götaland
- 2019: Division 2 Västra Götaland, 8th
Home colours	Away colours

Assyriska BK is a Swedish football club based in Västra Frölunda, Gothenburg. The club was formed in 1985 by Assyrian immigrants and is currently playing in Division 2 Västra Götaland which is the fourth tier of Swedish football. They play their home matches at Ruddalens IP in Västra Frölunda. Assyriska BK are affiliated to the Göteborgs Fotbollförbund.

== History ==
The Assyrians who had settled in Gothenburg formed in 1976 the football club Göteborgs Assyriska Idrottsförening (GAIF) that was attached to the Assyriska Mesopotamiska Association in Gothenburg.

After a couple years of football experience they formed in 1985 Assyriska BK (ABK) as a sports division of the Assyriska Mesopotamiska Association in Gothenburg. ABK was reformed into an independent association and formed with the objective of promoting their sporting interests in the Assyrian Association in Gothenburg. The club has its base within the Assyriska Association of Västra Frölunda with over 1,000 members. Since their foundation Assyriska BK has participated mainly in the middle and lower divisions of the Swedish football league system. Over the years the club has expanded and has today several youth teams.

In 2016 Assyriska BK was promoted for the first time in the club history to Division 1 which is the third tier of Swedish football.

In 1985 Yousif Sifo played on the team and has held all scoring records.

== Supporters ==
Assyriska BK's official fan club was formed in 2008 under the name Ultras Suryoye Göteborg, also known as USG.

== Current squad ==
As of 19 February 2020

Note: Flags indicate national team as defined under FIFA eligibility rules; some limited exceptions apply. Players may hold more than one non-FIFA nationality.

No.	Pos.	Nation	Player
1	GK	SWE	David Asmar
2	DF	SWE	Mustafa Ayoub
3	DF	SWE	Peter Björlund
4	DF	SWE	Mattias Ucar
5	DF	SWE	Mark Fezarit
6	MF	SWE	Sargon Cicek
7	MF	SWE	Daniel Albano Neves
8	MF	SWE	Ramsin Khoshaba
9	FW	KEN	Christopher Mbamba
10	FW	SWE	Gabriel Garis
11	FW	SWE	Arvin Shojaee

No.	Pos.	Nation	Player
12	DF	SWE	Meriton Qoraj
13	MF	SWE	Markus Kaplan
14	MF	NGA	Sheriffdeen Sulaimoh
15	DF	SWE	Lucas Isacksson
17	FW	SWE	Socras Lutonda
19	GK	SWE	Tobias Sörensen
20	DF	SWE	Hakan Köse
21	DF	SWE	Daniel Savari
22	DF	SWE	Emil Eliasson
23	MF	SWE	Rasmus Andernil Bozic
24	DF	SWE	Jake Weisbrod
99	FW	SWE	Kamal Mustafa

== Current staff ==
- Head coach: ' Ahrun Çiçek
- Assistant coach: George Kalyun
- Assistant coach: Daniel Stanisic
- Goalkeeper coach: Juan Ramon
- Physical Coach: Sohell Kassal

== Season to season ==
Season	Level	Division	Section	Position	Movements
1999	Tier 7	Division 6	Göteborg C	1st	Promoted
2000	Tier 6	Division 5	Göteborg B	9th	
2001	Tier 6	Division 5	Göteborg B	8th	
2002	Tier 6	Division 5	Göteborg B	9th	
2003	Tier 6	Division 5	Göteborg B	1st	Promoted
2004	Tier 5	Division 4	Göteborg B	5th	
2005	Tier 5	Division 4	Göteborg B	6th	
2006*	Tier 6	Division 4	Göteborg B	5th	
2007	Tier 6	Division 4	Göteborg B	4th	
2008	Tier 6	Division 4	Göteborg B	1st	Promoted
2009	Tier 5	Division 3	Sydvästra Götaland	1st	Promoted
2010	Tier 4	Division 2	Södra Götaland	9th	
2011	Tier 4	Division 2	Norra Götaland	2nd	
2012	Tier 4	Division 2	Västra Götaland	2nd	
2013	Tier 4	Division 2	Västra Götaland	4th	
2014	Tier 4	Division 2	Västra Götaland	4th	
2015	Tier 4	Division 2	Västra Götaland	7th	
2016	Tier 4	Division 2	Västra Götaland	1st	Promoted

* League restructuring in 2006 resulted in a new division being created at Tier 3 and subsequent divisions dropping a level.

== See also ==
- List of Assyrian football teams in Sweden
