= Eskilstuna City FK =

Swedish football club

- Full name: Eskilstuna City Fotbollklubb
- Founded: 1907
- Ground: Årby IP; Eskilstuna; Sweden
- Capacity: 250
- Chairman: Per Liljeroos
- Head coach: Aziz Halimi
- League: Division 4 Sörmland
- 2025: Division 5 Sörmland, 1st
- Website: http://www.city-fotboll.com/
Home colours	Away colours

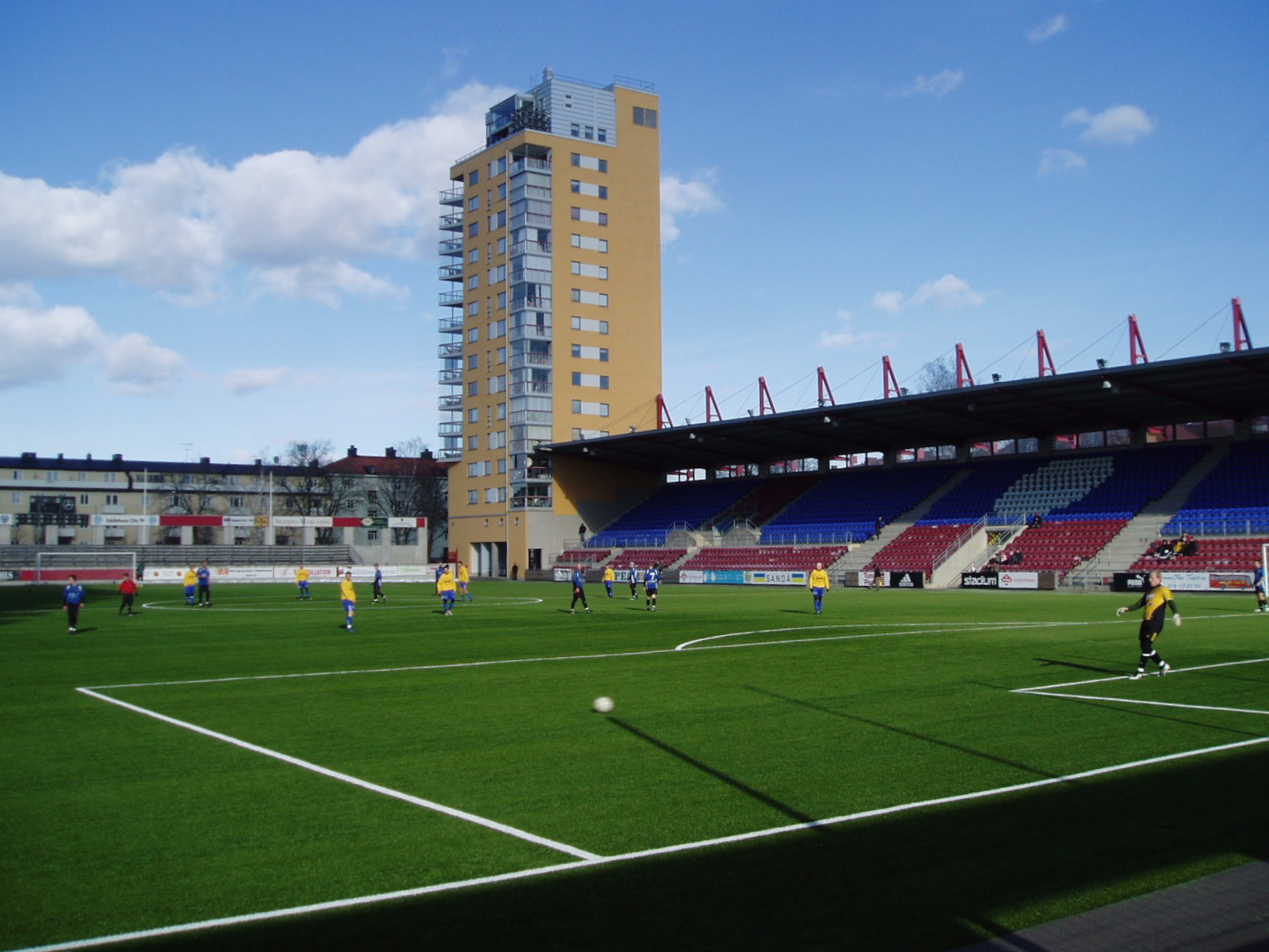
Tunavallen

Eskilstuna City FK is a Swedish football club located in Eskilstuna. The club is playing in Division 4.

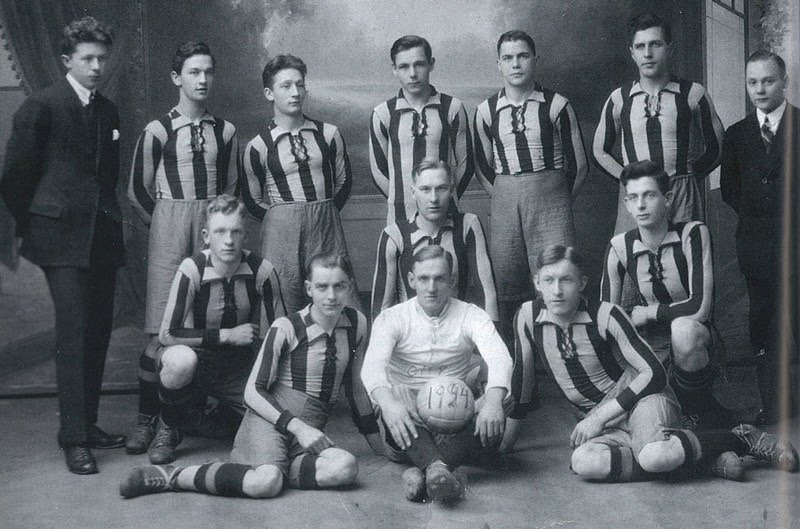
IK City from Eskilstuna, who got promoted to the top league in 1925 in Sweden, in the original match kit: light and dark blue striped shirts and light blue shorts.

== Background ==
The club, formed on 1 November 1907 as IK City, is playing in Division 2 Södra Svealand, the fourth highest Swedish league. IK City played one season in the highest league of Sweden, Allsvenskan, in 1925–26, finishing last. The club changed to its present name before the 2000 season. They play their home matches at the Tunavallen in Eskilstuna. City FK is currently the biggest football club in Eskilstuna. As well, the club played in Division 2 for 23 consecutive seasons (1988 until their promotion in 2011).

Since 2006, Eskilstuna Södra FF have had a cooperation agreement with Eskilstuna City FK, which has enabled young City players to be loaned in the middle of season to the lower division club.

In November 2007, the City FK reached an agreement, called Eskilstuna Elitfotboll, with local rivals IFK Eskilstuna. The agreement stipulates that the City shall constitute the city's top team with a view to progressing to the Allsvenskan while IFK will play a development role. The agreement covered three-years, and it was to be renegotiated every two years.

In terms of the respective clubs' playing history, the contractual implications may seem a little surprising given IFK's stronger record. However, City now play in a higher division than IFK and are more solid financially. City promoted to Division 1 in 2011, after remaining in the Division 2 for 23 consecutive seasons, by winning their section.

Eskilstuna City FK are affiliated to the Södermanlands Fotbollförbund.

== Season to season ==
IK City played in the following divisions:

Season	Level	Division	Section	Position	Movements
1993	Tier 3	Division 2	Västra Svealand	6th	
1994	Tier 3	Division 2	Västra Svealand	5th	
1995	Tier 3	Division 2	Västra Svealand	6th	
1996	Tier 3	Division 2	Västra Svealand	3rd	
1997	Tier 3	Division 2	Västra Svealand	3rd	
1998	Tier 3	Division 2	Västra Svealand	6th	
1999	Tier 3	Division 2	Västra Svealand	7th	

In recent seasons Eskilstuna City FK have competed in the following divisions:

Season	Level	Division	Section	Position	Movements
2000	Tier 3	Division 2	Västra Svealand	6th	
2001	Tier 3	Division 2	Västra Svealand	7th	
2002	Tier 3	Division 2	Västra Svealand	6th	
2003	Tier 3	Division 2	Västra Svealand	5th	
2004	Tier 3	Division 2	Västra Svealand	10th	Relegation Playoffs
2005	Tier 3	Division 2	Norra Svealand	10th	
2006*	Tier 4	Division 2	Östra Svealand	5th	
2007	Tier 4	Division 2	Östra Svealand	2nd	
2008	Tier 4	Division 2	Södra Svealand	2nd	
2009	Tier 4	Division 2	Södra Svealand	7th	
2010	Tier 4	Division 2	Södra Svealand	9th	
2011	Tier 4	Division 2	Södra Svealand	1st	Promoted
2012	Tier 3	Division 1	Norra	6th	
2013	Tier 3	Division 1	Norra	14th	Relegated
2014	Tier 4	Division 2	Södra Svealand	5th	
2015	Tier 4	Division 2	Södra Svealand	4th	
2016	Tier 4	Division 2	Södra Svealand	4th	
2017	Tier 4	Division 2	Södra Svealand	8th	
2018	Tier 4	Division 2	Södra Svealand	14th	Relegated
2019	Tier 5	Division 3	Södra Götaland	3rd	
2020	Tier 5	Division 3	Södra Götaland		

* League restructuring in 2006 resulted in a new division being created at Tier 3 and subsequent divisions dropping a level.

== Attendances ==
In recent seasons Eskilstuna City FK have had the following average attendances:

Season	Average attendance	Division / Section	Level
2003	424	Div 2 Västra Svealand	Tier 3
2004	506	Div 2 Västra Svealand	Tier 3
2005	359	Div 2 Norra Svealand	Tier 3
2006	372	Div 2 Östra Svealand	Tier 4
2007	841	Div 2 Östra Svealand	Tier 4
2008	824	Div 2 Södra Svealand	Tier 4
2009	454	Div 2 Södra Svealand	Tier 4
2010	333	Div 2 Södra Svealand	Tier 4
2011	677	Div 2 Södra Svealand	Tier 4
2012	812	Div 1 Norra	Tier 3
2013	Not Available	Div 1 Norra	Tier 3
2014	290	Div 2 Södra Svealand	Tier 4
2015	266	Div 2 Södra Svealand	Tier 4
2016	Not Available	Div 2 Södra Svealand	Tier 4
2017	Not Available	Div 2 Norra Svealand	Tier 4
2018	Not Available	Div 2 Södra Svealand	Tier 4
2019	?	Div 3 Södra Svealand	Tier 5
2020		Div 3 Södra Svealand	Tier 5

* Attendances are provided in the Publikliga sections of the Svenska Fotbollförbundet website.

== Achievements ==
- Allsvenskan:
  - Best placement (12th): 1925–26
