= 2025 Division 2 (Swedish football) =

Division 2
- Season: 2025
- Promoted: FBK Karlstad (Norra Götaland); FC Järfälla (Norra Svealand); Kristianstad FC (Södra Götaland); Laholms FK (Västra Götaland); Piteå IF (Norrland); Åtvidabergs FF (Södra Svealand)

The 2025 Division 2 for men, part of the 2025 Swedish football season is the 120th season of Sweden's fourth-tier football league in its current format.

== Teams ==
84 teams contest the league divided into six sections - Norra Götaland, Norra Svealand, Norrland (which itself are divided into two sections, Norra and Södra), Södra Götaland, Södra Svealand and Västra Götaland. The Division comprises 60 teams returning from the 2024 season, six relegated from Ettan and 18 promoted from Division 3. The champions of each section will qualify directly for promotion to Ettan, the runner-up from each section enters a six-team, two-group playoff, with the winner of each group earning promotion to Ettan. The bottom two teams in each section are relegated to Division 3 with the 12th place team in each section entering a relegation playoff.

== League tables ==
=== Norra Götaland ===
| Pos | Team | Pld | W | D | L | GF | GA | GD | Pts | Promotion, qualification or relegation |
|---|---|---|---|---|---|---|---|---|---|---|
| 1 | FBK Karlstad (C, P) | 26 | 16 | 4 | 6 | 62 | 29 | +33 | 52 | Promotion to Ettan |
| 2 | Motala AIF | 26 | 15 | 6 | 5 | 58 | 35 | +23 | 51 | Qualification to Promotion play-offs |
| 3 | Herrestads AIF | 26 | 12 | 8 | 6 | 51 | 27 | +24 | 44 | |
| 4 | Lidköpings FK | 26 | 12 | 8 | 6 | 38 | 25 | +13 | 44 | |
| 5 | Ahlafors IF | 26 | 10 | 10 | 6 | 41 | 37 | +4 | 40 | |
| 6 | IK Kongahälla | 26 | 10 | 7 | 9 | 57 | 42 | +15 | 37 | |
| 7 | Skara FC | 26 | 10 | 4 | 12 | 40 | 48 | −8 | 34 | |
| 8 | Grebbestads IF | 26 | 9 | 5 | 12 | 40 | 47 | −7 | 32 | |
| 9 | Vänersborgs IF | 26 | 7 | 10 | 9 | 44 | 50 | −6 | 31 | |
| 10 | Vänersborgs FK | 26 | 8 | 7 | 11 | 26 | 37 | −11 | 31 | |
| 11 | IK Tord | 26 | 7 | 9 | 10 | 32 | 39 | −7 | 30 | |
| 12 | IFK Kumla | 26 | 8 | 6 | 12 | 34 | 52 | −18 | 30 | Qualification to Relegation play-offs |
| 13 | IF Haga (R) | 26 | 6 | 5 | 15 | 26 | 54 | −28 | 23 | Relegation to Division 3 |
| 14 | Tidaholms GoIF (R) | 26 | 4 | 7 | 15 | 27 | 54 | −27 | 19 | Relegation to Division 3 |

Source: Svenskfotboll.se
Rules for classification: 1) Points; 2) Goal difference; 3) Number of goals scored
(C) Champions; (P) Promoted; (R) Relegated

=== Norra Svealand ===
| Pos | Team | Pld | W | D | L | GF | GA | GD | Pts | Promotion, qualification or relegation |
|---|---|---|---|---|---|---|---|---|---|---|
| 1 | FC Järfälla (C, P) | 26 | 19 | 4 | 3 | 60 | 19 | +41 | 61 | Promotion to Ettan |
| 2 | Falu BS | 26 | 16 | 7 | 3 | 53 | 24 | +29 | 55 | Qualification to Promotion play-offs |
| 3 | Bollstanäs SK | 26 | 14 | 5 | 7 | 57 | 36 | +21 | 47 | |
| 4 | Sunnersta AIF | 26 | 13 | 6 | 7 | 56 | 40 | +16 | 45 | |
| 5 | Viggbyholms IK | 26 | 13 | 6 | 7 | 53 | 43 | +10 | 45 | |
| 6 | Nacka FC | 26 | 13 | 3 | 10 | 65 | 45 | +20 | 42 | |
| 7 | IK Franke | 26 | 10 | 8 | 8 | 49 | 46 | +3 | 38 | |
| 8 | Täby FK | 26 | 10 | 4 | 12 | 55 | 47 | +8 | 34 | |
| 9 | Kungsängens IF | 26 | 9 | 6 | 11 | 37 | 36 | +1 | 33 | |
| 10 | Skiljebo SK | 26 | 8 | 7 | 11 | 43 | 52 | −9 | 31 | |
| 11 | Korsnäs IF | 26 | 8 | 7 | 11 | 40 | 57 | −17 | 31 | |
| 12 | FC Gute | 26 | 6 | 4 | 16 | 39 | 55 | −16 | 22 | Qualification to Relegation play-offs |
| 13 | Ytterhogdals IK (R) | 26 | 4 | 2 | 20 | 28 | 90 | −62 | 14 | Relegation to Division 3 |
| 14 | Österåker United FK (R) | 26 | 2 | 5 | 19 | 28 | 73 | −45 | 11 | Relegation to Division 3 |

Source: svenskfotboll.se
Rules for classification: 1) Points; 2) Goal difference; 3) Number of goals scored
(C) Champions; (P) Promoted; (R) Relegated

=== Norrland ===
==== Spring series ====
===== Norra =====
| Pos | Team | Pld | W | D | L | GF | GA | GD | Pts | Promotion, qualification or relegation |
|---|---|---|---|---|---|---|---|---|---|---|
| 1 | Piteå IF | 12 | 9 | 2 | 1 | 32 | 12 | +20 | 29 | Qualification to Promotion group |
| 2 | Skellefteå FF | 12 | 7 | 2 | 3 | 24 | 16 | +8 | 23 | Qualification to Promotion group |
| 3 | IFK Luleå | 12 | 6 | 4 | 2 | 21 | 11 | +10 | 22 | Qualification to Promotion group |
| 4 | Bergnäsets AIK | 12 | 3 | 4 | 5 | 12 | 20 | −8 | 13 | Qualification to Relegation group |
| 5 | Bodens BK | 12 | 3 | 3 | 6 | 10 | 20 | −10 | 12 | Qualification to Relegation group |
| 6 | Kiruna FF | 12 | 1 | 5 | 6 | 13 | 23 | −10 | 8 | Qualification to Relegation group |
| 7 | Boden City | 12 | 1 | 4 | 7 | 12 | 22 | −10 | 7 | Qualification to Relegation group |

Source: Svenskfotboll.se
Rules for classification: 1) Points; 2) Goal difference; 3) Number of goals scored

===== Södra =====
| Pos | Team | Pld | W | D | L | GF | GA | GD | Pts | Promotion, qualification or relegation |
|---|---|---|---|---|---|---|---|---|---|---|
| 1 | IFK Östersund | 12 | 9 | 1 | 2 | 39 | 18 | +21 | 28 | Qualification to Promotion group |
| 2 | Umeå FC Akademi | 12 | 8 | 0 | 4 | 32 | 19 | +13 | 24 | Qualification to Promotion group |
| 3 | Kubikenborgs IF | 12 | 7 | 0 | 5 | 20 | 22 | −2 | 21 | Qualification to Promotion group |
| 4 | Gottne IF | 12 | 5 | 1 | 6 | 18 | 21 | −3 | 16 | Qualification to Promotion group |
| 5 | Friska Viljor | 12 | 5 | 0 | 7 | 24 | 25 | −1 | 15 | Qualification to Relegation group |
| 6 | Lucksta IF | 12 | 3 | 1 | 8 | 19 | 30 | −11 | 10 | Qualification to Relegation group |
| 7 | Täfteå IK | 12 | 2 | 3 | 7 | 11 | 28 | −17 | 9 | Qualification to Relegation group |

Source: Svenskfotboll.se
Rules for classification: 1) Points; 2) Goal difference; 3) Number of goals scored

==== Autumn series ====
===== Promotion group =====
| Pos | Team | Pld | W | D | L | GF | GA | GD | Pts | Promotion, qualification or relegation |
|---|---|---|---|---|---|---|---|---|---|---|
| 1 | Piteå IF | 3 | 3 | 0 | 0 | 10 | 1 | +9 | 15 | Promotion to Ettan |
| 2 | Skellefteå FF | 3 | 3 | 0 | 0 | 14 | 1 | +13 | 13 | Qualification to Promotion play-offs |
| 3 | IFK Östersund | 2 | 2 | 0 | 0 | 4 | 2 | +2 | 12 | |
| 4 | Kubikenborgs IF | 2 | 1 | 0 | 1 | 2 | 5 | −3 | 5 | |
| 5 | Umeå FC Akademi | 3 | 0 | 0 | 3 | 1 | 9 | −8 | 4 | |
| 6 | IFK Luleå | 2 | 0 | 0 | 2 | 2 | 7 | −5 | 2 | |
| 7 | Gottne IF | 3 | 0 | 0 | 3 | 0 | 8 | −8 | 0 | |

Updated to match(es) played on 9 August 2025. Source: Svenskfotboll.se
Rules for classification: 1) Points; 2) Goal difference; 3) Number of goals scored

===== Relegation group =====
| Pos | Team | Pld | W | D | L | GF | GA | GD | Pts | Promotion, qualification or relegation |
|---|---|---|---|---|---|---|---|---|---|---|
| 1 | Bergnäsets AIK | 2 | 1 | 0 | 1 | 5 | 4 | +1 | 9 | |
| 2 | Lucksta IF | 2 | 2 | 0 | 0 | 4 | 2 | +2 | 8 | |
| 3 | Bodens BK | 2 | 1 | 0 | 1 | 4 | 3 | +1 | 7 | |
| 4 | Täfteå IK | 2 | 2 | 0 | 0 | 6 | 1 | +5 | 6 | |
| 5 | Friska Viljor | 1 | 0 | 0 | 1 | 1 | 3 | −2 | 4 | Qualification to Relegation play-offs |
| 6 | Kiruna FF | 2 | 0 | 0 | 2 | 1 | 6 | −5 | 2 | Relegation to Division 3 |
| 7 | Boden City | 1 | 0 | 0 | 1 | 2 | 4 | −2 | 0 | Relegation to Division 3 |

Updated to match(es) played on 9 August 2025. Source: Svenskfotboll.se
Rules for classification: 1) Points; 2) Goal difference; 3) Number of goals scored

=== Södra Götaland ===
| Pos | Team | Pld | W | D | L | GF | GA | GD | Pts | Promotion, qualification or relegation |
|---|---|---|---|---|---|---|---|---|---|---|
| 1 | Kristianstad FC (C, P) | 26 | 18 | 4 | 4 | 47 | 22 | +25 | 58 | Promotion to Ettan |
| 2 | FK Karlskrona | 26 | 16 | 5 | 5 | 59 | 28 | +31 | 53 | Qualification to Promotion play-offs |
| 3 | IFK Trelleborg | 26 | 13 | 7 | 6 | 58 | 41 | +17 | 46 | |
| 4 | Sölvesborgs GoIF | 26 | 13 | 6 | 7 | 54 | 41 | +13 | 45 | |
| 5 | Växjö Norra IF | 26 | 11 | 5 | 10 | 46 | 32 | +14 | 38 | |
| 6 | Räppe GOIF | 26 | 9 | 10 | 7 | 29 | 32 | −3 | 37 | |
| 7 | Torns IF | 26 | 10 | 4 | 12 | 30 | 46 | −16 | 34 | |
| 8 | Linero IF | 26 | 10 | 3 | 13 | 39 | 45 | −6 | 33 | |
| 9 | Nosaby IF | 26 | 9 | 6 | 11 | 41 | 48 | −7 | 33 | |
| 10 | IFK Karlshamn | 26 | 10 | 2 | 14 | 31 | 43 | −12 | 32 | |
| 11 | Österlen FF | 26 | 9 | 3 | 14 | 41 | 43 | −2 | 30 | |
| 12 | Högaborgs BK | 26 | 8 | 4 | 14 | 43 | 53 | −10 | 28 | Qualification to Relegation play-offs |
| 13 | IFK Hässleholm (R) | 26 | 6 | 4 | 16 | 36 | 58 | −22 | 22 | Relegation to Division 3 |
| 14 | FBK Balkan (R) | 26 | 4 | 9 | 13 | 34 | 56 | −22 | 21 | Relegation to Division 3 |

Source: Svenskfotboll.se
Rules for classification: 1) Points; 2) Goal difference; 3) Number of goals scored
(C) Champions; (P) Promoted; (R) Relegated

=== Södra Svealand ===
| Pos | Team | Pld | W | D | L | GF | GA | GD | Pts | Promotion, qualification or relegation |
|---|---|---|---|---|---|---|---|---|---|---|
| 1 | Åtvidabergs FF (C, P) | 26 | 21 | 3 | 2 | 70 | 18 | +52 | 66 | Promotion to Ettan |
| 2 | Rågsveds IF | 26 | 16 | 3 | 7 | 63 | 29 | +34 | 51 | Qualification to Promotion play-offs |
| 3 | IF Sylvia | 26 | 15 | 2 | 9 | 51 | 34 | +17 | 47 | |
| 4 | IK Sleipner | 26 | 12 | 6 | 8 | 42 | 36 | +6 | 42 | |
| 5 | FoC Farsta | 26 | 13 | 2 | 11 | 53 | 38 | +15 | 41 | |
| 6 | Enskede IK | 26 | 11 | 5 | 10 | 42 | 41 | +1 | 38 | |
| 7 | Smedby AIS | 26 | 8 | 9 | 9 | 48 | 48 | 0 | 33 | |
| 8 | Nyköpings BIS | 26 | 9 | 6 | 11 | 39 | 40 | −1 | 33 | |
| 9 | BK Forward | 26 | 9 | 5 | 12 | 47 | 49 | −2 | 32 | |
| 10 | Syrianska FC | 26 | 8 | 7 | 11 | 34 | 50 | −16 | 31 | |
| 11 | IF Eker | 26 | 9 | 4 | 13 | 44 | 65 | −21 | 31 | |
| 12 | Huddinge IF | 26 | 9 | 3 | 14 | 48 | 64 | −16 | 30 | Qualification to Relegation play-offs |
| 13 | Arameisk-Syrianska (R) | 26 | 6 | 5 | 15 | 32 | 63 | −31 | 23 | Relegation to Division 3 |
| 14 | Syrianska Eskilstuna (R) | 26 | 2 | 8 | 16 | 30 | 68 | −38 | 14 | Relegation to Division 3 |

Source: Svenskfotboll.se
Rules for classification: 1) Points; 2) Goal difference; 3) Number of goals scored
(C) Champions; (P) Promoted; (R) Relegated

=== Västra Götaland ===
| Pos | Team | Pld | W | D | L | GF | GA | GD | Pts | Promotion, qualification or relegation |
|---|---|---|---|---|---|---|---|---|---|---|
| 1 | Laholms FK (C, P) | 26 | 19 | 3 | 4 | 69 | 33 | +36 | 60 | Promotion to Ettan |
| 2 | Tvååkers IF | 26 | 17 | 6 | 3 | 70 | 24 | +46 | 57 | Qualification to Promotion play-offs |
| 3 | Åstorps FF | 26 | 13 | 6 | 7 | 43 | 32 | +11 | 45 | |
| 4 | Onsala BK | 26 | 13 | 5 | 8 | 64 | 41 | +23 | 44 | |
| 5 | Västra Frölunda | 26 | 13 | 3 | 10 | 50 | 50 | 0 | 42 | |
| 6 | Lindome GIF | 26 | 13 | 2 | 11 | 63 | 54 | +9 | 41 | |
| 7 | Qviding FIF | 26 | 11 | 5 | 10 | 57 | 48 | +9 | 38 | |
| 8 | Jonsereds IF | 26 | 10 | 8 | 8 | 48 | 48 | 0 | 38 | |
| 9 | BK Astrio | 26 | 10 | 6 | 10 | 55 | 44 | +11 | 36 | |
| 10 | Landvetter IS | 26 | 10 | 3 | 13 | 47 | 55 | −8 | 33 | |
| 11 | Hestrafors IF | 26 | 6 | 8 | 12 | 40 | 48 | −8 | 26 | |
| 12 | IF Böljan | 26 | 6 | 5 | 15 | 33 | 59 | −26 | 23 | Qualification to Relegation play-offs |
| 13 | Varbergs GIF (R) | 26 | 7 | 1 | 18 | 29 | 58 | −29 | 22 | Relegation to Division 3 |
| 14 | Bergdalens IK (R) | 26 | 2 | 3 | 21 | 25 | 99 | −74 | 9 | Relegation to Division 3 |

Source: Svenskfotboll.se
Rules for classification: 1) Points; 2) Goal difference; 3) Number of goals scored
(C) Champions; (P) Promoted; (R) Relegated

== Promotion play-offs ==
=== Group 1 ===
| Pos | Team | Pld | W | D | L | GF | GA | GD | Pts | Qualification |
|---|---|---|---|---|---|---|---|---|---|---|
| 1 | Falu BS (Q) | 2 | 1 | 1 | 0 | 4 | 1 | +3 | 4 | Qualification to Promotion play-offs |
| 2 | Rågsveds IF | 2 | 1 | 0 | 1 | 4 | 3 | +1 | 3 | |
| 3 | IFK Östersund | 2 | 0 | 1 | 1 | 1 | 5 | −4 | 1 | |

Rules for classification: 1) Points; 2) Points in regular season; 3) Head-to-head points in regular season; 4) Head-to-head goal difference in regular season; 5) Head-to-head goals scored in regular season; 6) Goal difference.
(Q) Qualified for the phase indicated

=== Group 2 ===
| Pos | Team | Pld | W | D | L | GF | GA | GD | Pts | Qualification |
|---|---|---|---|---|---|---|---|---|---|---|
| 1 | Tvååkers IF (O, P) | 2 | 2 | 0 | 0 | 6 | 3 | +3 | 6 | Qualification to Promotion play-offs |
| 2 | FK Karlskrona | 2 | 1 | 0 | 1 | 6 | 3 | +3 | 3 | |
| 3 | Motala AIF | 2 | 0 | 0 | 2 | 1 | 7 | −6 | 0 | |

Rules for classification: 1) Points; 2) Points in regular season; 3) Head-to-head points in regular season; 4) Head-to-head goal difference in regular season; 5) Head-to-head goals scored in regular season; 6) Goal difference.
(O) Play-off winners; (P) Promoted
