= 2024 Division 2 (Swedish football) =

Division 2
- Season: 2024
- Champions: Arlanda; Haninge; Hässleholm; IFK Skövde
- Promoted: Arlanda; Haninge; Hässleholm; IFK Skövde; Enköping
- Relegated: Dalkurd; Frösö; Gauthiod; Hittarp; Ljungsbro; Mjölby; Säffle; Öckerö

The 2024 Division 2 for men, part of the 2024 Swedish football season is the 19th season of Sweden's fourth-tier football league in its current format.

== Teams ==
84 teams contest the league divided into six sections - Norra Götaland, Norra Svealand, Norrland, Södra Götaland, Södra Svealand and Västra Götaland. The Division comprises 60 teams returning from the 2023 season, six relegated from Division 1 and 18 promoted from Division 3. The champions of each section will qualify directly for promotion to Division 1, the runner-up from each section enters a six-team, two-group playoff, with the winner of each group earning promotion to Division 1. The bottom two teams in each section are relegated to Division 3 with the 12th place team in each section entering a relegation playoff.

== League tables ==
=== Norra Götaland ===
Pos	Team	Pld	W	D	L	GF	GA	GD	Pts	Promotion, qualification or relegation
1	Skövde (C)	26	19	4	3	61	25	+36	61	Promotion to Division 1
2	Kongahälla	26	14	5	7	52	37	+15	47	Qualification to Promotion play-offs
3	Herrestad	26	13	6	7	46	30	+16	45	
4	Ahlafors	26	10	9	7	47	41	+6	39	
5	Lidköping	26	10	9	7	38	34	+4	39	
6	Grebbestad	26	11	5	10	59	38	+21	38	
7	Kumla	26	10	8	8	49	46	+3	38	
8	Motala	26	10	7	9	47	51	−4	37	
9	Vänersborgs FK	26	10	3	13	38	48	−10	33	
10	Forward	26	6	10	10	38	39	−1	28	
11	Vänersborgs IF	26	7	6	13	30	47	−17	27	
12	Stenungsund	26	5	9	12	28	44	−16	24	Qualification to Relegation Play-offs
13	Gauthiod	26	6	6	14	36	62	−26	24	Relegation to Division 3
14	Säffle	26	5	5	16	29	56	−27	20	Relegation to Division 3

Source: Soccerway
Rules for classification: 1) Points; 2) Goal difference; 3) Number of goals scored
(C) Champions

=== Norra Svealand ===
Pos	Team	Pld	W	D	L	GF	GA	GD	Pts	Promotion, qualification or relegation
1	Arlanda (C, P)	26	20	4	2	74	26	+48	64	Promotion to Division 1
2	Enköping (Q)	26	16	5	5	66	34	+32	53	Qualification to Promotion play-offs
3	Viggbyholm	26	12	7	7	43	26	+17	43	
4	Gute	26	12	5	9	51	35	+16	41	
5	Järfälla	26	12	2	12	39	39	0	38	
6	Franke	26	10	6	10	46	43	+3	36	
7	Falu	26	9	8	9	32	36	−4	35	
8	Farsta	26	9	8	9	41	46	−5	35	
9	Kungsängen	26	10	3	13	31	43	−12	33	
10	Österåker	26	9	4	13	32	47	−15	31	
11	Skiljebo	26	7	7	12	36	47	−11	28	
12	Sandvikens AIK (Q)	26	6	8	12	33	44	−11	26	Qualification to Relegation Play-offs
13	Hudiksvall (R)	26	6	8	12	27	49	−22	26	Relegation to Division 3
14	Dalkurd (R)	26	4	5	17	32	68	−36	17	Relegation to Division 3

Source: Soccerway
Rules for classification: 1) Points; 2) Goal difference; 3) Number of goals scored
(C) Champions; (P) Promoted; (Q) Qualified for the phase indicated; (R) Relegated

=== Norrland ===
Pos	Team	Pld	W	D	L	GF	GA	GD	Pts	Promotion, qualification or relegation
1	Team TG (P)	26	21	3	2	86	19	+67	66	Promotion to Division 1
2	Boden (Q)	26	21	3	2	75	24	+51	66	Qualification to Promotion play-offs
3	Bergnäset	26	16	2	8	53	46	+7	50	
4	Skellefteå	26	14	5	7	54	32	+22	47	
5	IFK Östersund	26	13	5	8	50	35	+15	44	
6	Ytterhogdal	26	13	5	8	44	36	+8	44	
7	Luleå	26	11	7	8	40	41	−1	40	
8	Gottne	26	10	6	10	44	37	+7	36	
9	Umeå FC Akademi	26	8	3	15	40	62	−22	27	
10	Kiruna	26	7	5	14	23	49	−26	26	
11	Lucksta	26	7	4	15	43	62	−19	25	
12	Täfteå (Q)	26	7	3	16	38	56	−18	24	Qualification to Relegation Play-offs
13	Frösö (R)	26	4	2	20	33	78	−45	14	Relegation to Division 3
14	Älgarna-Härnösand (R)	26	2	3	21	34	80	−46	9	Relegation to Division 3

Source: Soccerway
Rules for classification: 1) Points; 2) Goal difference; 3) Number of goals scored
(P) Promoted; (Q) Qualified for the phase indicated; (R) Relegated

=== Södra Götaland ===
Pos	Team	Pld	W	D	L	GF	GA	GD	Pts	Promotion, qualification or relegation
1	Hässleholms IF (C, P)	26	18	7	1	51	16	+35	61	Promotion to Division 1
2	Kristianstad (Q)	26	16	6	4	58	28	+30	54	Qualification to Promotion play-offs
3	Österlen	26	14	3	9	50	45	+5	45	
4	Karlskrona	26	12	6	8	52	40	+12	42	
5	Karlshamn	26	12	4	10	44	48	−4	40	
6	IFK Trelleborg	26	10	7	9	55	44	+11	37	
7	Högaborg	26	12	1	13	40	40	0	37	
8	Räppe	26	9	8	9	33	35	−2	35	
9	Balkan	26	10	2	14	35	38	−3	32	
10	IFK Hässleholm	26	8	5	13	29	40	−11	29	
11	Nosaby	26	7	5	14	28	43	−15	26	
12	Simrishamn (Q)	26	7	5	14	33	56	−23	26	Qualification to Relegation Play-offs
13	Lödde (R)	26	6	6	14	32	49	−17	24	Relegation to Division 3
14	Berga (R)	26	7	3	16	34	52	−18	24	Relegation to Division 3

Source: Soccerway
Rules for classification: 1) Points; 2) Goal difference; 3) Number of goals scored
(C) Champions; (P) Promoted; (Q) Qualified for the phase indicated; (R) Relegated

=== Södra Svealand ===
Pos	Team	Pld	W	D	L	GF	GA	GD	Pts	Promotion, qualification or relegation
1	Haninge (C)	26	21	3	2	86	33	+53	66	Promotion to Division 1
2	Sylvia	26	15	6	5	51	28	+23	51	Qualification to Promotion play-offs
3	Arameisk-Syrianska	26	14	4	8	52	39	+13	46	
4	Nyköping	26	13	6	7	52	42	+10	45	
5	Åtvidaberg	26	12	4	10	47	41	+6	40	
6	Syrianska	26	11	7	8	42	41	+1	40	
7	Huddinge	26	10	4	12	39	33	+6	34	
8	Sleipner	26	9	7	10	40	48	−8	34	
9	Enskede	26	10	3	13	38	41	−3	33	
10	Nacka Iliria	26	9	5	12	41	45	−4	32	
11	Smedby	26	8	5	13	38	43	−5	29	
12	IFK Eskilstuna	26	6	7	13	44	61	−17	25	Qualification to Relegation Play-offs
13	Ljungsbro	26	5	7	14	35	59	−24	22	Relegation to Division 3
14	Mjölby	26	4	2	20	33	84	−51	14	Relegation to Division 3

Source: Soccerway
Rules for classification: 1) Points; 2) Goal difference; 3) Number of goals scored
(C) Champions

=== Västra Götaland ===
Pos	Team	Pld	W	D	L	GF	GA	GD	Pts	Promotion, qualification or relegation
1	Husqvarna (P)	26	16	7	3	44	27	+17	55	Promotion to Division 1
2	Astrio (Q)	26	17	3	6	63	30	+33	54	Qualification to Promotion play-offs
3	Qviding	26	16	4	6	68	43	+25	52	
4	Varbergs GIF	26	15	5	6	49	30	+19	50	
5	Landvetter	26	13	6	7	56	44	+12	45	
6	Västra Frölunda	26	9	9	8	58	50	+8	36	
7	Tord	26	10	6	10	45	39	+6	36	
8	Laholm	26	9	4	13	46	52	−6	31	
9	Lindome	26	8	5	13	49	50	−1	29	
10	Bergdalen	26	8	4	14	53	70	−17	28	
11	Jonsered	26	8	4	14	36	54	−18	28	
12	Sävedalen (Q)	26	6	9	11	33	57	−24	27	Qualification to Relegation Play-offs
13	Öckerö (R)	26	5	6	15	36	57	−21	21	Relegation to Division 3
14	Hittarp (R)	26	3	6	17	21	54	−33	15	Relegation to Division 3

Source: Soccerway
Rules for classification: 1) Points; 2) Goal difference; 3) Number of goals scored
(P) Promoted; (Q) Qualified for the phase indicated; (R) Relegated

== Promotion play-offs ==
Group 1

1. Enköping – 6 pts.
2. Sylvia – 3 pts.
3. Boden – 0 pts.

Group 2

1. Astrio – 4 pts.
2. Kristianstad – 3 pts.
3. Kongahälla – 1 pts.

Source: Soccerway

Enköping and Astrio advance to the play-offs between the 13th-place finishers in the two groups of the 2024 Ettan.
