= Football in Stockholm =

Location of Greater Stockholm teams of the national league system.
Red: Allsvenskan; Yellow: Superettan; Orange: Division 1 Norra; Blue: Division 2 Norra Svealand; Green: Division 2 Södra Svealand; Purple: Division 3 Östra Svealand; Pink: Division 3 Södra Svealand.

Football in Stockholm organises about 60,000 players and is governed by Stockholm Football Association since 1917. Stockholm has several of Sweden's leading football clubs, and the city is home to 39 teams in the national league system and more than 100 amateur leagues regulated by the Stockholm Football Association. At the moment there are three Stockholm teams in the first-tier Allsvenskan, four in the second-tier Superettan, four in the third-tier Division 1.

Stockholm's most successful team is AIK, with twelve national championship golds and eight cup golds. Djurgårdens IF has twelve national championship golds and five cup golds. Hammarby IF has one national championship gold, which was won in 2001. AIK played their first national championship final in 1898 Svenska Mästerskapet.

Strawberry Arena in Solna, is the national stadium of Sweden men's national football team and the largest stadium in Sweden. It is also home ground to AIK. 3Arena is the home ground for both Hammarby IF and Djurgårdens IF since 2013. The old ground of AIK was called Råsunda Stadium and was active up until 2012. Djurgårdens IF played at the Stockholm Olympic Stadium until 2013 and Hammarby IF had their home games at Söderstadion until 2013.

== History ==
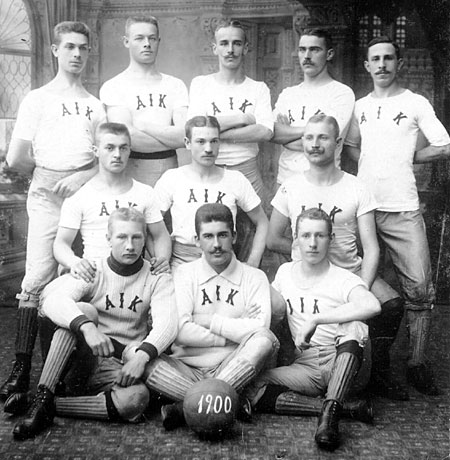
AIK squad of 1900.

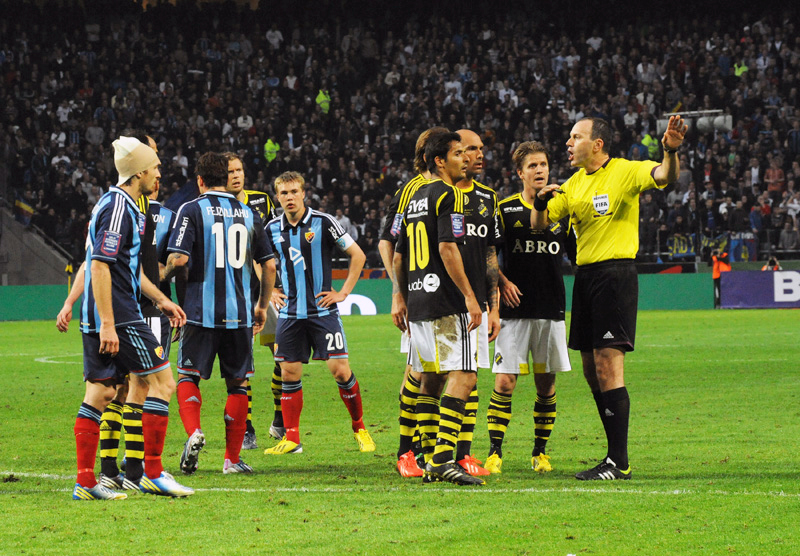
AIK–Djurgårdens IF in 2013.

AIK started a football department in 1896 and played in the 1898 Svenska Mästerskapet final, which they lost to Örgryte IS of Gothenburg. In 1899, AIK played Djurgårdens IF, in their first match, which ended 2–1 to AIK on Ladugårdsgärdet. Their rivalry later became Tvillingderbyt (The Twin derby).

Football in Stockholm was early organised into leagues and in the 1902 season AIK, AIK II, Djurgårdens IF, IF Sleipner, IF Swithiod, Norrmalms SK, and Östermalms SK played in the Svenska Bollspelsförbundets första serie that Djurgården won.

In the 1924–25 season, AIK and Hammarby IF participated in the first Allsvenskan. Later also Westermalms IF (debut in 1926–27), Djurgårdens IF (debut in 1927–28), Reymersholms IK (debut in 1941–42) and IF Brommapojkarna (debut in 2007) have participated in Allsvenskan.

In 2001, three Stockholm teams ended top-three in Swedish top-tier Allsvenskan, Hammarby IF won, Djurgårdens IF Fotboll finished second and AIK finished third.

== Teams ==
The table below lists all Stockholm clubs in the top five tiers of the Swedish football league system: from the top division (Allsvenskan), down to the Division 3. League status is correct for the 2024 season in Swedish football.

The list only includes clubs that are affiliated to the Stockholm Football Association.

Team	Founded	Stadium	Capacity
Allsvenskan (1)
AIK	1891 (Note: Football department in 1896.)	Strawberry Arena	54,000
Djurgårdens IF	1891 (Note: Football department in 1899.)	3Arena	30,001
Hammarby IF	1897 (Note: Football department in 1915.)	3Arena	30,001
IF Brommapojkarna	1942	Grimsta IP	4,729
Superettan (2)
Ettan (3)
FC Stockholm Internazionale	2010	Kristinebergs IP	2,145
Hammarby Talang FF		Hammarby IP	3,100
IFK Stocksund	2005	Jurek Arena Danderyd	1,000
Karlbergs BK	1912	Stadshagens IP	
Sollentuna FK	2013	Sollentunavallen	4,500
Täby FK	2012	Tibblevallen	1,000
Vasalund IF	1934	Skytteholms IP	5,200
Division 2 (4)
Arameisk-Syrianska IF	1980	Brunna IP	
Enskede IK	1914	Enskede IP	1,000
Huddinge IF	1912	Källbrinks IP	2,500
Nacka FC	2015	Saltsjöbadens IP	
Viggbyholms IK FF	1930	Hägernäs IP	
FC Järfälla	1993	Järfällavallen	
Kungsängens IF	1929	Kungsängens IP	
IFK Haninge	2004	Torvalla IP	
FOC Farsta	1977	Farsta IP	
Österåker United FK	1928	Österåkers Friidrottsarena	
Division 3 (5)
Bollstanäs SK	1922	Bollstanäs IP	
Boo FF	1981	Boovallen	
FC Brandbergen		Brandbergens IP	
Fittja IF	1994	Fittja BP	
Hanvikens SK	1944	Trollbäckens IP	
IFK Aspudden-Tellus	1968	Aspuddens IP	
IFK Lidingö FK	1932	Lidingövallen	
IK Frej	1968	Vikingavallen	1,250
Reymersholms IK	1899	Zinkensdamms IP	6,500
Rågsveds IF	1958	Hagsätra IP	
Segeltorps IF	1925	Segeltorps IP	
Spånga IS FK	1929	Spånga IP	
Vendelsö IK	1941	Haningevallen	
Åkersberga FC	2015	Röllingby	
Älta IF	1941	Älta IP	

== Most successful teams ==
Team	Swedish champions	Svenska Cupen	Supercupen	Domestic total
AIK	12	8	1	19
Djurgårdens IF	12	5	0	15
Hammarby IF	1	1	0	2

== See also ==
- Football in Sweden
