= Mohamed Amin (footballer) =

Sudanese footballer

Personal information
- Full name: Mohamed Sharaf El-Din Amin
- Date of birth: 6 November 1999 (age 27)
- Place of birth: Juba, Sudan
- Position: Left-back

Team information
- Current team: Ahlafors
- Number: 26

Senior career*
Years	Team	Apps	(Gls)
2018–2019	Norrby	10	(0)
2019–2020	Vårgårda	24	(1)
2021	Motala	11	(0)
2022	Ullareds	11	(0)
2022	Bergdalens	5	(0)
2023	Ytterhogdals	11	(0)
2023–	Ahlafors	4	(0)

International career^{‡}
2021–	Sudan	2	(0)
- * Club domestic league appearances and goals as of 30 November 2023 ‡ National team caps and goals as of 11:44, 9 January 2022 (UTC)

Mohamed Sharaf El-Din Amin (Arabic: محمد أمين; born 6 November 1999) is a Sudanese footballer who currently plays as a left-back for Ahlafors.

== Career statistics ==
=== Club ===
As of 9 January 2022.

Club	Season	League			Cup		Other		Total	
Club	Season	Division	Apps	Goals	Apps	Goals	Apps	Goals	Apps	Goals
Norrby	2018	Superettan	0	0	0	0	0	0	0	0
Norrby	2019	Superettan	0	0	0	0	0	0	0	0
Norrby	Total		0	0	0	0	0	0	0	0
Vårgårda	2019	Division 2 - Norra Götaland	18	0	2 (Note: Appearances in the Svenska Cupen)	0	0	0	20	0
Vårgårda	2020	Division 2 - Norra Götaland	6	1	0	0	0	0	6	1
Vårgårda	Total		24	1	2	0	0	0	26	1
Motala	2021	Division 2 - Södra Svealand	11	0	0	0	0	0	11	0
Career total			35	1	2	0	0	0	37	1

=== International ===
As of match played 9 January 2022.

National team	Year	Apps	Goals
Sudan	2021	2	0
Total		2	0
