= Bivesh Gurung =

English footballer (born 2001)

Personal information
- Date of birth: 1 July 2001 (age 25)
- Place of birth: Maidstone, England
- Height: 1.82 m (6 ft 0 in)
- Position: Defensive midfielder

Team information
- Current team: Ramsgate

Youth career
- 2015–2017: Maidstone United
- 2017–2019: Crystal Palace

Senior career*
Years	Team	Apps	(Gls)
2019–2020	Trysil	11	(4)
2020	Ytterhogdal	12	(2)
2021	Margate	7	(0)
2021–2025	Maidstone United	84	(2)
2023	→ Tonbridge Angels (loan)	1	(0)
2025	Folkestone Invicta	0	(0)
2025–2026	Dover Athletic	28	(0)
2026–	Ramsgate	0	(0)
- * Club domestic league appearances and goals as of 16:35, 24 July 2026 (UTC)

Bivesh Gurung (born 1 July 2001) is an English footballer who plays as a defensive midfielder for Isthmian League Premier Division club Ramsgate.

== Early life ==
Gurung was born in Maidstone, Kent to Nepalese parents, Bhupal and Sanu, from the Khotang District.

== Career ==
Having first played football at his school, Gurung joined the academy of Maidstone United at the age of fourteen in 2015. After eighteen months with the club's academy, he moved to Premier League side Crystal Palace, after five months of trialling. After two years in the academy of Crystal Palace, he moved to Norway in 2019, joining Trysil, where he went on to score four times in thirteen Norwegian Fourth Division appearances.

He remained in Scandinavia for the following season, joining Swedish side Ytterhogdal. He scored twice in twelve league appearances for the side, including the only goal in a 1–0 win against Boden, but left the club at the end of 2020. On his return to England, he went on trial with Premier League side Chelsea, and was named on the bench for a friendly match against Brentford B, going on to feature briefly as a substitute.

Having not been offered a contract by Chelsea, Gurung dropped down to the Isthmian League, joining Margate at the beginning of the 2021–22 season. After only seven league appearances, he was scouted and signed by former side Maidstone United, now in the National League South, but featured sparingly in his first season with the club as they achieved promotion to the National League. Despite starting the following season with more game time, including scoring his first goal for the club, he was sent on a one-month loan to National League South side Tonbridge Angels in January 2023, reuniting with former manager Jay Saunders, whom he had worked with at both Margate and Maidstone United.

On his return to Maidstone United, he established himself in the first team squad, before extending his contract in May 2023, despite the club's relegation back to the National League South. The following season, having helped Maidstone United to a 2–0 win against Chesham United in the FA Cup first round proper, he was named as a starter in the club's second round match against League Two side Barrow. With the score at 1–1, Gurung received the ball on the edge of the area from Sam Bone, before driving a shot past Barrow goalkeeper Paul Farman into the top left-hand corner of the goal. The match-winning strike was later voted 'goal of the round', with Gurung crediting his mother for the goal, revealing that she had encouraged him to shoot more.

On 12 September 2025, Gurung joined Isthmian League Premier Division club Folkestone Invicta. The following month, he joined National League South club Dover Athletic.

In July 2026, Gurung joined Isthmian League Premier Division club Ramsgate.

== Style of play ==
Gurung describes himself as "a defensive midfielder, a bit like a deep-lying playmaker", a position in which he has flourished. During his second spell with Maidstone United, he was also utilised as a central defender.

== Career statistics ==
As of end of 2025–26 season

Appearances and goals by club, season and competition
Club	Season	League			Cup		Other		Total	
Club	Season	Division	Apps	Goals	Apps	Goals	Apps	Goals	Apps	Goals
Trysil	2019	4. divisjon	11	4	0	0	2 (Note: Appearances in 3. divisjon playoffs)	0	13	4
Ytterhogdal	2020	Division 2	12	2	1 (Note: Appearances in the Svenska Cupen)	1	0	0	13	3
Margate	2021–22	Isthmian League	7	0	3 (Note: Appearances in FA Cup qualification)	0	1 (Note: Appearances in FA Trophy qualification)	0	11	0
Maidstone United	2021–22	National League South	5	0	0	0	0	0	5	0
Maidstone United	2022–23	National League	16	1	0	0	3 (Note: One appearance in the Kent Senior Cup, two appearances in the FA Trophy)	0	19	1
Maidstone United	2023–24	National League South	32	0	2 (Note: Appearances in the FA Cup)	1	2 (Note: One appearance in FA Trophy, one appearance in National League South play-offs)	0	36	1
Maidstone United	2024–25	National League South	31	1	3	0	4 (Note: One appearance in FA Trophy, three appearances in National League South play-offs)	0	38	1
Maidstone United	Total		84	2	5	1	9	0	98	3
Tonbridge Angels (loan)	2022–23	National League South	1	0	0	0	0	0	1	0
Folkestone Invicta	2025–26	Isthmian League Premier Division	0	0	3	0	2 (Note: One appearance and one goal in Kent Senior Cup, one appearance in FA Trophy)	1	5	1
Dover Athletic	2025–26	National League South	28	0	—		0	0	28	0
Career total			143	8	12	2	14	1	169	11
