= Mahoto =

Mahoto is both a given name and a surname. Notable people with the name include:

- Mahoto Watanabe (born 1992), Japanese YouTuber
- Ethany Mahoto (born 2001), Motswana footballer
- Gauthier Mahoto (born 1992), French footballer
