= Andréas Grahm =

Swedish footballer

Personal information
- Full name: Andréas Grahm
- Date of birth: 1 September 1987 (age 39)
- Place of birth: Sweden
- Height: 1.83 m (6 ft 0 in)
- Position: Forward

Team information
- Current team: Nosaby IF

Youth career
- Nosaby IF
- Kristianstads FF

Senior career*
Years	Team	Apps	(Gls)
2006	Rinkaby GoIF		(16)
2007	Fjälkinge IF	20	(23)
2008–2010	VMA IK	60	(58)
2011–2013	Trelleborgs FF	37	(4)
2013	Ängelholms FF	15	(1)
2014–2018	Kristianstad FC	108	(48)
2018–	Nosaby IF	0	(0)
- * Club domestic league appearances and goals as of 4 August 2018

Andréas Grahm (born 1 September 1987) is a Swedish footballer who plays for Nosaby IF as a forward.
