= Nosaby level crossing accident =

2004 railway incident in Sweden

Details
- Date: 10 September 2004; 09:07
- Location: Länsväg 118/Blekinge kustbana, Level crossing at Nosaby Church in Kristianstad
- Coordinates: 56°03′05″N 14°11′41″E
- Country: Sweden
- Incident type: Collision with truck
- Cause: Truck stopped at level crossing

Statistics
- Trains: 1
- Deaths: 2
- Injured: 47

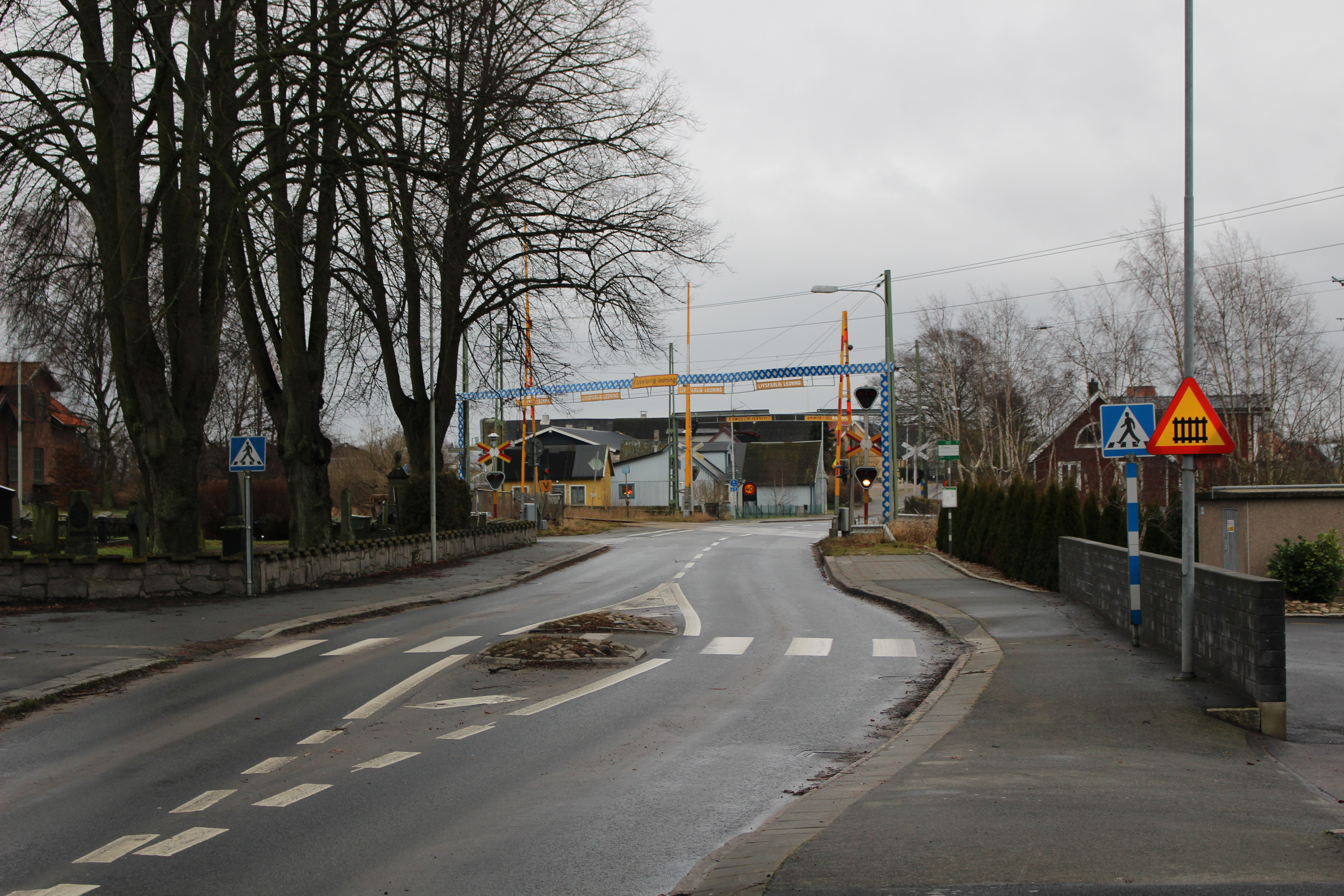
The level crossing in Nosaby

The Nosaby level crossing accident (Swedish: Järnvägsolyckan i Nosaby or Tågolyckan i Nosaby) occurred on 10 September 2004 at 9.07 a.m. in Nosaby, Kristianstad Municipality, Sweden.

== Accident ==
Train 357 bound for Malmö left Karlskrona at 7.33 a.m. According to witnesses, a truck was going to pass the level crossing near Nosaby Church exactly when the barriers went down at 9.00 a.m. The train crashed into the truck trailer and the pellets which were loaded in the trailer flew out. The truck was thrown forward and crashed into another truck that was waiting for the barriers to go up.

The first railcar derailed completely and rotated 180°. The second and third also derailed, destroying the rail and the embankment.

The two drivers who were at the front of the train (one on duty, one off) died and 47 passengers were injured.

== Legal process ==
The truck driver claimed that he was dazzled by the sun, and that he didn't see the barriers that went down. Rather than quickly leaving the level crossing by driving through the barrier, he left the truck and tried to lift the barrier while the truck was left on the rail. On 19 December 2005, he was sentenced to prison for 1 year and 2 months for reckless driving ("vårdslöshet i trafik"), causing death ("vållande till annans död") and causing bodily harm ("vållande till kroppsskada") by Kristianstads Tingsrätt.

== References and sources ==
- The Swedish Accident Investigation Board's report
- Trafikverket's report
