= Ejupi =

Ejupi is a surname. Notable people with this surname include:

- Albert Ejupi (born 1992), Swedish football player
- Elizabeta Ejupi (born 1994), Albanian football player
- Leonora Ejupi (born 2000), Kosovar football player
- Muzafer Ejupi (born 1988), Macedonian football player
