= Ethany Mahoto =

Namibian footballer

Personal information
- Full name: Ethany Mahoto
- Date of birth: 20 January 2001 (age 25)
- Place of birth: Lüderitz, Namibia
- Position: Attacking midfielder

Team information
- Current team: IF Sylvia
- Number: 17

Youth career
- –2016: IFK Luleå

Senior career*
Years	Team	Apps	(Gls)
2017–2019	IFK Luleå	15	(0)
2017	→ Bergnäsets AIK (Loan)	16	(4)
2019	Lindsdals IF	6	(0)
2019	Kiruna FF	6	(0)
2020–2021	Piteå IF	13	(0)
2021	Notvikens IK	19	(2)
2022	Gottne IF	12	(0)
2023–	IF Sylvia	0	(0)

International career^{‡}
2022–	Botswana	1	(0)
- * Club domestic league appearances and goals as of 17 July 2023 ‡ National team caps and goals as of 13:44, 9 December 2022 (UTC)

Ethany Mahoto (born 20 January 2001) is a Motswana footballer who plays for Swedish Ettan club IF Sylvia and the Botswana national team.

== Club career ==
Mahoto began playing football while a child in Botswana. Throughout his career in Sweden, he has played mostly in the lower divisions after beginning in the academy of IFK Luleå.

In 2019 he was offered a scholarship to play college soccer in the United States for the Vikings of North Park University.

Mahoto joined Gottne IF in January 2022 after appearing for Piteå IF and Notvikens IK the previous season. Later that year he revealed in an interview that he had opportunities to play at a higher level and became homesick every time, but was now ready to move forward. In November 2022 Mahoto left Gottne IF to seek out other opportunities.

== International career ==
Mahoto was born in Francistown, Botswana to Namibian parents from the Zambezi Region before immigrating to Sweden with his mother. He was called up to the Namibian national team in February 2020 in preparation for the 2020 African Nations Championship. At the time he stated that Namibia is his homeland and he had no connection to Botswana other than being born there. The player decided to leave the training camp with no desire to return after seeing a lack of structure or plan forward for the team. He also noted that the two managers of the team at the time were at odds with each other and behaved unprofessionally.

Despite his previous comments, Mahoto accepted a call-up from Botswana national team coach Mogomotsi Mpote in November 2022 for a friendly against Angola. At the time, Mahoto stated that both Namibia and Botswana were his countries and he "loves both countries the same." However, he did not close the door on representing Namibia in the future, stating, "I will play for the team that wants me the most...and I will give everything to the country that gives me the chance."

Mahoto went on to receive his first senior cap for Botswana in the match against Angola, coming on as a late second-half substitute in the 0–1 defeat on 17 November 2022.

=== International statistics ===
As of match played 17 November 2022

Botswana
Year	Apps	Goals
2022	1	0
Total	1	0
