= Hampus Holmgren =

Finnish footballer (born 1995)

Personal information
- Date of birth: 14 November 1995 (age 30)
- Place of birth: Vaasa, Finland
- Height: 1.75 m (5 ft 9 in)
- Position: Right back

Team information
- Current team: Landvetter IS

Youth career
- Vasa IFK

Senior career*
Years	Team	Apps	(Gls)
2011–2013	Vasa IFK	26	(0)
2013–2017	Åtvidaberg	60	(1)
2018	Levanger	22	(0)
2019	VPS	16	(0)
2019	VPS II	2	(0)
2021–	Landvetter IS		

International career
2011	Finland U17	3	(0)
2013	Finland U19	1	(0)
	Finland U21	4	(0)
- * Club domestic league appearances and goals as of 28 January 2025

Hampus Holmgren (born 14 November 1995) is a Finnish football player who plays as a right back for Landvetter IS.
