= Alexander Leksell =

Swedish footballer

Personal information
- Full name: Eric Fredrik Alexander Leksell
- Date of birth: 14 February 1997 (age 29)
- Place of birth: Sweden
- Height: 1.79 m (5 ft 10 in)
- Position: Defender

Team information
- Current team: Landvetter IS

Youth career
- Tuve IF
- 2009–2012: IK Zenith
- 2013–2016: IFK Göteborg

Senior career*
Years	Team	Apps	(Gls)
2016	IFK Göteborg	1	(0)
2017–2018	GAIS	14	(1)
2019–2022	Trollhättan	101	(1)
2023–2026	Ekenäs IF	57	(1)
2026–	Landvetter IS	0	(0)

International career
2012–2014	Sweden U17	12	(1)
2014–2016	Sweden U19	12	(1)
- * Club domestic league appearances and goals as of 13 March 2026

Eric Fredrik Alexander Leksell (born 14 February 1997) is a Swedish footballer who plays for Swedish Division 2 club Landvetter IS as a defender.

== Career ==
In August 2017, when playing for GAIS, Leksell suffered an ACL injury and was out for twelve months.

== Career statistics ==
As of 23 October 2024.

Appearances and goals by club, season and competition
Club	Season	League			Cup (Note: Includes Svenska Cupen and Suomen Cup)		League cup (Note: Includes Ykköscup and Finnish League Cup)		Europe		Total	
Club	Season	Division	Apps	Goals	Apps	Goals	Apps	Goals	Apps	Goals	Apps	Goals
IFK Göteborg	2016	Allsvenskan	1	0	0	0	–		1 (Note: Appearance(s) in UEFA Europa League)	0	2	0
GAIS	2017	Superettan	11	1	2	1	–		–		13	2
GAIS	2018	Superettan	3	0	0	0	–		–		3	0
GAIS	Total		14	1	2	1	0	0	0	0	16	2
Trollhättan	2019	Swedish Division 1	26	0	1	0	–		–		27	0
Trollhättan	2020	Ettan	19	0	–		–		–		19	0
Trollhättan	2021	Ettan	28	0	1	0	–		–		29	0
Trollhättan	2022	Ettan	29	1	–		–		–		29	1
Trollhättan	Total		102	1	2	0	0	0	0	0	104	1
Ekenäs IF	2023	Ykkönen	26	1	4	0	4	0	–		34	1
Ekenäs IF	2024	Veikkausliiga	15	0	5	2	5	0	–		25	2
Ekenäs IF	Total		41	1	9	2	9	0	0	0	59	3
Career total			158	3	13	3	9	0	1	0	181	6

== Honours ==
Ekenäs IF

- Ykkönen: 2023
