= Grahm =

Grahm is a surname. Notable people with the surname include:

- Andréas Grahm (born 1987), Swedish footballer
- Erika Grahm (born 1991), Swedish ice hockey player

== See also ==
- Grahm Junior College, a defunct junior college in Boston, Massachusetts, United States
- Graham (disambiguation)
