= Dean Solomons =

South African soccer player

Personal information
- Full name: Dean Ryan Solomons
- Date of birth: 22 February 1999 (age 27)
- Place of birth: Cape Town, South Africa
- Position: Defender

Team information
- Current team: Piteå IF
- Number: 4

Youth career
- –2017: Ajax Cape Town
- 2017–2018: Ajax

Senior career*
Years	Team	Apps	(Gls)
2018–2020	Jong Ajax	11	(0)
2021	Varbergs BoIS	1	(0)
2023–	Piteå IF	47	(3)

International career^{‡}
2017	South Africa U20	1	(0)
- * Club domestic league appearances and goals as of 1 January 2025 ‡ National team caps and goals as of 4 September 2017

Dean Ryan Solomons (born 22 February 1999) is a South African professional soccer player who plays as a defender for Swedish Piteå IF.

== Club career ==
A product of Ikamva, the youth academy of Ajax Cape Town, Solomons transferred to the parent club in Amsterdam in 2017. He made his debut for the main squad of Ajax on 7 July 2018 in a friendly against FC Nordsjælland, as a 83rd-minute substitute for Luis Manuel Orejuela.

He made his Eerste Divisie debut for Jong Ajax on 10 September 2018 in a game against Jong AZ, as a starter.

On 30 March 2021, it was announced that Solomons had signed with Swedish Allsvenskan side Varbergs BoIS on a 3-year contract. In December 2021, he was released by the Swedish side.

On 29 December 2022, Solomons signed a contract with Swedish Ettan-Norra side Piteå IF on contract until 31 December 2024.
