= 2020 Division 2 (Swedish football) =

Division 2
- Season: 2020

The 2020 Division 2, part of the 2020 Swedish football season is the 15th season of Sweden's fourth-tier football league in its current format.

== Teams ==
84 teams contest the league divided into six sections - Norra Götaland, Norra Svealand, Norrland, Södra Svealand, Västra Götaland and Östra Götaland. The Division comprises 60 teams returning from the 2019 season, six relegated from Division 1 and 18 promoted from Division 3. The champion of each section will qualify directly for promotion to Division 1, the runner-up from each section enters a six-team, two-group playoff, with the winner of each group earning promotion to Division 1. The bottom two teams in each section are relegated to Division 3 with the 12th place team in each section entering a relegation playoff.

== League tables ==
=== Norra Götaland ===
Pos	Team	Pld	W	D	L	GF	GA	GD	Pts	Promotion, qualification or relegation
1	Vänersborgs IF (C, P)	13	10	3	0	30	13	+17	33	Promotion to Division 1
2	Oddevold	13	10	1	2	31	11	+20	31	Qualification to Promotion play-offs
3	Stenungsund	13	7	3	3	24	16	+8	24	
4	Grebbestad	13	6	3	4	24	20	+4	21	
5	Ahlafors	13	6	3	4	33	32	+1	21	
6	Lidköpings	13	5	4	4	25	20	+5	19	
7	Gauthiod	13	4	6	3	16	12	+4	18	
8	Vänersborgs FK	13	5	3	5	37	35	+2	18	
9	Nordvärmland	13	4	5	4	20	20	0	17	
10	Sävedalen	13	5	2	6	28	30	−2	17	
11	Karlstad II	13	3	3	7	25	32	−7	12	
12	Tidaholm	13	2	2	9	18	29	−11	8	Qualification to Relegation Play-offs
13	Vårgårda (R)	13	2	2	9	14	27	−13	8	Relegation to Division 3
14	Åmål (R)	13	1	2	10	13	41	−28	5	Relegation to Division 3

Updated to match(es) played on 17 October 2020. Source: Soccerway
Rules for classification: 1) Points; 2) Goal difference; 3) Number of goals scored
(C) Champions; (P) Promoted; (R) Relegated

=== Norra Svealand ===
Pos	Team	Pld	W	D	L	GF	GA	GD	Pts	Promotion, qualification or relegation
1	Hudiksvall (C, P)	13	10	2	1	33	15	+18	32	Promotion to Division 1
2	Skiljebo	13	9	0	4	30	18	+12	27	Qualification to Promotion play-offs
3	Enköping	13	8	1	4	27	15	+12	25	
4	Lidingö	13	8	0	5	35	27	+8	24	
5	Karlberg	13	6	5	2	22	7	+15	23	
6	Gamla Upsala	13	7	2	4	28	22	+6	23	
7	Enskede	13	7	1	5	29	27	+2	22	
8	Stockholm Internazionale	13	5	4	4	22	17	+5	19	
9	Stocksund	13	5	3	5	19	18	+1	18	
10	Österåker	13	5	1	7	21	28	−7	16	
11	Kvarnsveden	13	3	2	8	15	19	−4	11	
12	Kungsängen	13	3	1	9	23	31	−8	10	Qualification to Relegation Play-offs
13	Fanna (R)	13	2	1	10	17	35	−18	7	Relegation to Division 3
14	Fagersta Södra (R)	13	1	1	11	10	52	−42	4	Relegation to Division 3

Updated to match(es) played on 18 October 2020. Source: Soccerway
Rules for classification: 1) Points; 2) Goal difference; 3) Number of goals scored
(C) Champions; (P) Promoted; (R) Relegated

=== Norrland ===
Pos	Team	Pld	W	D	L	GF	GA	GD	Pts	Promotion, qualification or relegation
1	Piteå (C, P)	13	10	2	1	32	9	+23	32	Promotion to Division 1
2	Boden	13	8	3	2	24	10	+14	27	Qualification to Promotion play-offs
3	IFK Östersund	13	7	2	4	32	19	+13	23	
4	Friska Viljor	13	7	2	4	27	17	+10	23	
5	Ytterhogdal	13	7	2	4	24	16	+8	23	
6	Umeå FC	13	7	2	4	28	23	+5	23	
7	Gottne	13	7	1	5	22	18	+4	22	
8	Stöde	13	7	1	5	26	23	+3	22	
9	Skellefteå	13	6	1	6	14	18	−4	19	
10	Notviken	13	5	3	5	18	28	−10	18	
11	Täfteå	13	3	3	7	20	29	−9	12	
12	Sandvik	13	2	2	9	9	24	−15	8	Qualification to Relegation Play-offs
13	IFK Umeå (R)	13	1	2	10	15	29	−14	5	Relegation to Division 3
14	Morön (R)	13	1	0	12	9	37	−28	3	Relegation to Division 3

Updated to match(es) played on 17 October 2020. Source: Soccerway
Rules for classification: 1) Points; 2) Goal difference; 3) Number of goals scored
(C) Champions; (P) Promoted; (R) Relegated

=== Södra Svealand ===
Pos	Team	Pld	W	D	L	GF	GA	GD	Pts	Promotion, qualification or relegation
1	Assyriska (C, P)	13	10	1	2	37	11	+26	31	Promotion to Division 1
2	Åtvidaberg (P)	13	10	1	2	33	18	+15	31	Qualification to Promotion play-offs
3	Forward	13	9	3	1	32	14	+18	30	
4	Tyresö	13	9	1	3	31	15	+16	28	
5	Värmbols	13	5	4	4	24	21	+3	19	
6	Kumla	13	5	3	5	31	26	+5	18	
7	Arameisk-Syrianska	13	5	2	6	19	28	−9	17	
8	Trosa Vagnhärad	13	4	4	5	20	25	−5	16	
9	Eskilstuna	13	4	2	7	17	28	−11	14	
10	Gute	13	3	4	6	17	25	−8	13	
11	Huddinge	13	3	3	7	20	26	−6	12	
12	Rynninge	13	3	2	8	15	28	−13	11	Qualification to Relegation Play-offs
13	Assyriska IF (R)	13	3	0	10	14	30	−16	9	Relegation to Division 3
14	Newroz (R)	13	2	2	9	19	34	−15	8	Relegation to Division 3

Updated to match(es) played on 17 October 2020. Source: Soccerway
Rules for classification: 1) Points; 2) Goal difference; 3) Number of goals scored
(C) Champions; (P) Promoted; (R) Relegated

=== Västra Götaland ===
Pos	Team	Pld	W	D	L	GF	GA	GD	Pts	Promotion, qualification or relegation
1	IFK Malmö (C, P)	13	9	2	2	25	7	+18	29	Promotion to Division 1
2	Västra Frölunda	13	8	3	2	31	14	+17	27	Qualification to Promotion play-offs
3	Ängelholm	13	8	2	3	20	9	+11	26	
4	Varberg	13	6	3	4	28	23	+5	21	
5	Vinberg	13	5	3	5	22	25	−3	18	
6	Rosengård 1917	13	4	5	4	23	21	+2	17	
7	Olympic	13	5	2	6	21	20	+1	17	
8	Onsala	13	5	2	6	27	29	−2	17	
9	Assyriska	13	5	1	7	20	33	−13	16	
10	Ullared	13	5	0	8	16	25	−9	15	
11	Eslöv	13	4	3	6	20	30	−10	15	
12	Prespa Birlik	13	5	0	8	22	34	−12	15	Qualification to Relegation Play-offs
13	Halmia (R)	13	2	6	5	18	21	−3	12	Relegation to Division 3
14	Limhamn Bunkeflo (R)	13	3	2	8	16	18	−2	11	Relegation to Division 3

Updated to match(es) played on 18 October 2020. Source: Soccerway
Rules for classification: 1) Points; 2) Goal difference; 3) Number of goals scored
(C) Champions; (P) Promoted; (R) Relegated

=== Östra Götaland ===
Pos	Team	Pld	W	D	L	GF	GA	GD	Pts	Promotion, qualification or relegation
1	Österlen (C, P)	13	10	1	2	30	9	+21	31	Promotion to Division 1
2	Dalstorp	13	7	4	2	21	13	+8	25	Qualification to Promotion play-offs
3	Syrianska	13	7	3	3	14	12	+2	24	
4	Nosaby	13	7	1	5	28	20	+8	22	
5	Hässleholm	13	7	1	5	25	21	+4	22	
6	Asarum	13	6	1	6	24	25	−1	19	
7	Räppe	13	5	3	5	20	19	+1	18	
8	Husqvarna	13	5	2	6	20	20	0	17	
9	Karlshamn	13	5	2	6	17	23	−6	17	
10	Tord	13	4	4	5	22	21	+1	16	
11	Kristianstad	13	4	3	6	16	25	−9	15	
12	Hässleholm	13	4	1	8	22	26	−4	13	Qualification to Relegation Play-offs
13	Älmeboda/Linneryd (R)	13	3	2	8	19	34	−15	11	Relegation to Division 3
14	Bromölla (R)	13	3	0	10	13	23	−10	9	Relegation to Division 3

Updated to match(es) played on 18 October 2020. Source: Soccerway
Rules for classification: 1) Points; 2) Goal difference; 3) Number of goals scored
(C) Champions; (P) Promoted; (R) Relegated
