= Football in Sweden =

- Country: Sweden
- Governing body: SvFF
- National team: Sweden
- First played: 1870; 156 years ago

National competitions
- FIFA World Cup; UEFA European Championship; UEFA Nations League

Club competitions
- List: League: Allsvenskan Damallsvenskan Superettan Division 1 Division 2 Division 3 Division 4 Division 5 Division 6 Division 7 Division 8 * Cups: Svenska Cupen Svenska Cupen (women)

International competitions
- FIFA Club World Cup; UEFA Champions League; UEFA Women's Champions League; UEFA Europa League; UEFA Conference League; UEFA Super Cup

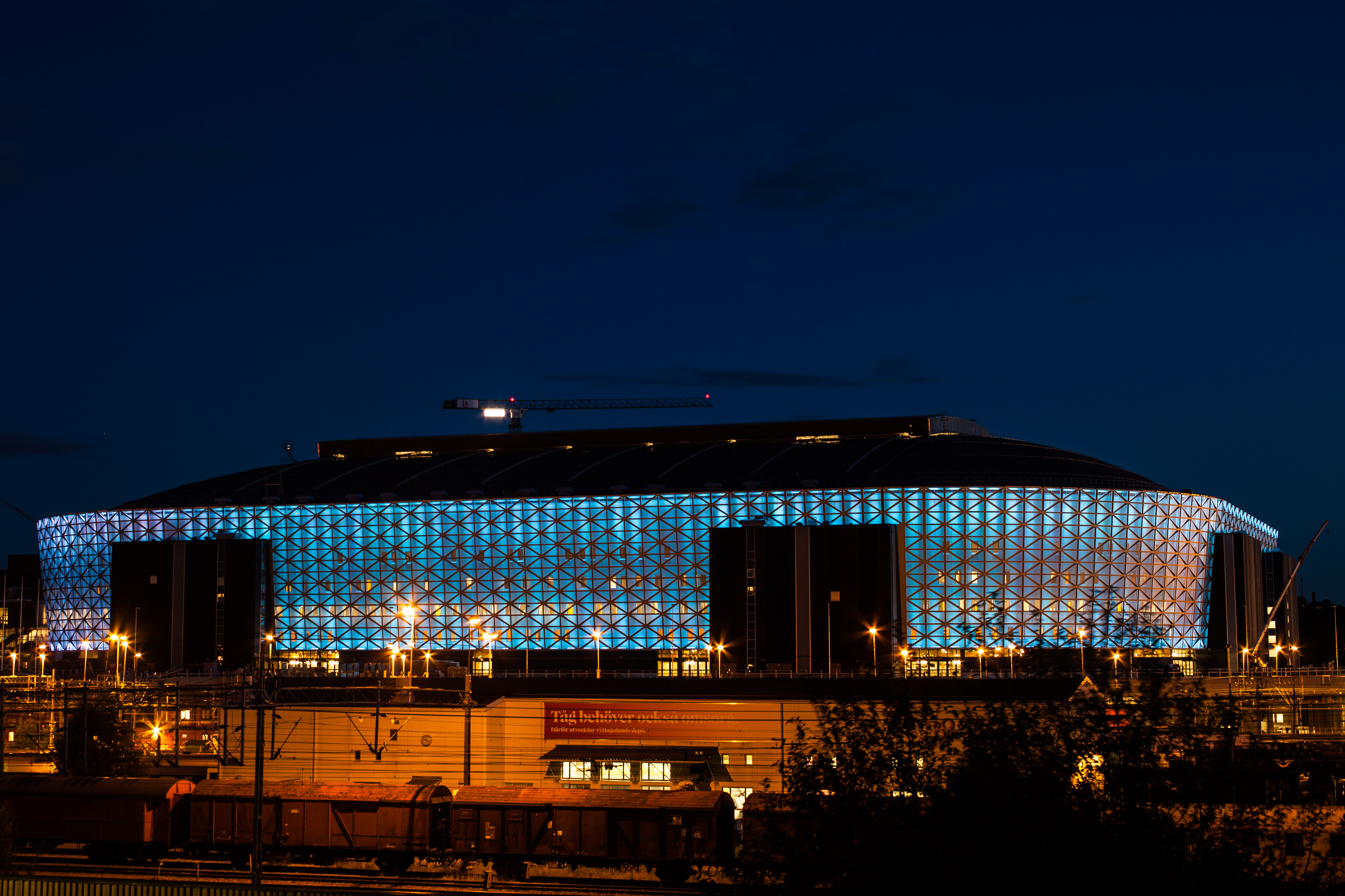
Strawberry Arena in Solna

Association football (Swedish: fotboll) is the most popular sport in Sweden, with over 240,000 licensed players (approximately 56,000 women and 184,000 men) with another 240,000 youth players. There are around 3,200 active clubs fielding over 8,500 teams, which are playing on the 7,900 pitches available in the country. Approximately 60% of the Swedish people are interested in football.

Football was first played in Sweden in the 1870s, the first championship was decided in 1896 and the Swedish Football Association was founded in 1904. Despite being a relatively small country population-wise, both the men's and women's national teams and the club teams have gained rather large success from time to time.

== History ==
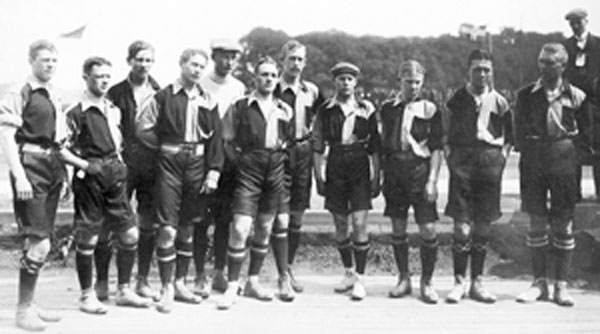
The first Swedish national team in 1908.

Football, along with other organised sports, came to Sweden in the 1870s and was mainly exercised by gymnastics clubs which exercised most of the sports of the time. England and Scotland were the main sources of inspiration and it is thus not strange that football gained popularity fast, with the first agreement of rules made in 1885 by the clubs active in Gothenburg, Stockholm and Visby. The first international club match was played in 1890 and the first match with modern rules was played two years later in 1892.

The first association to administer a Swedish national football tournament was Svenska Idrottsförbundet, founded 1895 in Gothenburg, the dominating football town in Sweden, at the time. The association arranged Svenska Mästerskapet in 1896 which Örgryte IS won. The tournament was played until 1925 when the first national league, Allsvenskan, was started. In the late 1890s, the IFK associations began playing football, and by 1901, the first Kamratmästerskap (IFK championship) in football was arranged.

Football has grown since and there is currently around 3,300 clubs with 32,700 teams and with one million members, whereof about half a million are active players, altogether.

== League system ==
The current national league system administered by the football association is organised as 1-1-2-6-12, where Allsvenskan is the highest Swedish level and Superettan the second highest, followed by two third level (Division 1), six fourth level (Division 2) and twelve fifth level leagues (Division 3). Below Division 3 are several lower leagues, in some areas going all the way down to the ninth level, (Division 7), or in the case of Upplands FF, the tenth level (Division 8), overseen by regional football associations.

== Cup system ==
The national cup Svenska Cupen is played by all 32 teams from Allsvenskan and Superettan and 64 teams from the lower divisions. Which 64 teams from the lower divisions that get to play is decided by the number of licensed players in the football districts.

== International titles ==
The Sweden men's national football team played its first international football match in 1908 against Norway. The team has been fairly successful with one 2nd place in the 1958 World Cup, two third places (1950 and 1994) and a victory in the 1948 Summer Olympics. The Sweden women's national football team was once leading in the development of women's football and won the unofficial European Championships in 1984, a success the team has not managed to repeat, however, it won a silver in the 2003 World Cup.

Swedish clubs have appeared in European club competition finals 10 times. In men's football, IFK Göteborg won the UEFA Cup twice, 1982 and 1987, and Malmö FF lost the European Cup final in 1979. In the women's game, Umeå IK won the UEFA Women's Cup twice, in 2003 and 2004, and lost in the final in 2001, 2007 and 2008; Djurgårdens IF Dam (then known as Djurgården/Älvsjö) lost in the final in 2005; and Tyresö FF lost in the final of the renamed UEFA Women's Champions League in 2014.

== Seasons ==
Swedish football began to have regular seasons from 1924 on, when Allsvenskan started. Before that, tournaments were played irregularly. Svenska Mästerskapet for example, the decider of the Swedish Champions in the early years, was played spring-autumn, while Svenska Serien, the national league, was played autumn-spring. Some years, it was played spring-autumn-spring due to various reasons, and other years it was not played at all due to economical trouble. In 1959, Swedish football changed from autumn-spring to spring-autumn seasons. Allsvenskan has not been suspended any season since its start.

The last five seasons:

- 2014
- 2015
- 2016
- 2017
- 2018

== Swedish champions ==
The current Swedish Champions title is held by the winners of Allsvenskan. The title has existed since 1896, although no club was given the title between 1926 and 1930. The 117 championships have been won by 19 different football clubs so far, with the top four title holders being Malmö FF (20 titles), IFK Göteborg (18 titles), IFK Norrköping (13 titles) and Örgryte IS (12). Clubs from the three largest cities in Sweden, Stockholm, Gothenburg and Malmö have held the title the majority of the seasons, 78 in total, but there is also an example of a very small municipality being able to field a club capable of winning the title, as Åtvidabergs FF from Åtvidaberg held the title twice, in 1972 and 1973.

The last five holders of the title:

- 2014 – Malmö FF
- 2015 – IFK Norrköping
- 2016 – Malmö FF
- 2017 – Malmö FF
- 2018 – AIK
- 2019 – Djurgårdens IF
- 2020 – Malmö FF

== Competition records ==
=== European Cup ===
The following teams have advanced to elimination rounds in the European Cup.

- Runner-up: Malmö FF (1978–79)
- Semi-finals: IFK Göteborg (1985–86)
- Quarter-finals: Djurgården (1955–56), IFK Malmö (1960–61), Åtvidabergs FF (1974–75), IFK Göteborg (1984–85, 1988–89)

=== UEFA Champions League ===
The following teams have advanced to elimination rounds in the UEFA Champions League.

- Quarter-finals: IFK Göteborg (1994–95)
- Group Stage: IFK Göteborg (1992–93, 1996–97, 1997–98), AIK (1999–2000), Helsingborgs IF (2000–01), Malmö FF (2014–15, 2015–16, 2021-2021)

=== UEFA Cup ===
The following teams have advanced to elimination rounds in the UEFA Cup.

- Champions: IFK Göteborg (1981–82, 1986–87)
- Round of 32: Helsingborgs IF (2007–08)

=== UEFA Europa League ===
The following teams have advanced to elimination rounds in the UEFA Europa League.

- Round of 32: Östersund (2017–18), Malmö FF (2018–19, 2019–20)

UEFA Cup Winners' Cup

The following teams have advanced to elimination rounds in the UEFA Cup Winner’s Cup

- Quarter-finals: Malmö FF (1974-1975, 1986-1987), IFK Göteborg (1979-1980), AIK (1996-1997), Åtvidabergs FF (1971-1972),

=== UEFA Women's Champions League ===
The following teams have advanced to elimination rounds in the UEFA Women's Champions League or its predecessor, the UEFA Women's Cup.

Club names are current, not necessarily those used when a club competed in a given season.

- Champions: Umeå IK (2003, 2004)
- Runner-up:
  - Umeå IK (2002, 2007, 2008)
  - Djurgårdens IF Dam (2005)
  - Tyresö FF (2014)
- Semi-finals:
  - FC Rosengård (2004)
  - Umeå IK (2010)
- Quarter-finals:
  - Umeå IK (2005, 2009)
  - Djurgårdens IF Dam (2006)
  - Linköpings FC (2011, 2015)
  - Kopparbergs/Göteborg FC (2012, 2013)
  - FC Rosengård (2012, 2013, 2015, 2016)
- Round of 16:
  - Linköpings FC (2010)
  - FC Rosengård (2014)
  - KIF Örebro DFF (2016)

== Largest football stadiums in Sweden ==
Football stadiums with a capacity of at least 20,000 are included.

Overall Rank	Image	Stadium	Capacity	Club	Division	Rank in Respective Divisions	Ref
1		Strawberry Arena	50,653	Sweden men's national football team	National stadium	N/A	
1		Strawberry Arena	50,653	AIK	Allsvenskan	1	
2		Tele2 Arena	30,000	Djurgårdens IF	Allsvenskan	2	
2		Tele2 Arena	30,000	Hammarby	Allsvenskan	2	
3		Stadion	21,000	Malmö FF	Allsvenskan	3	

== Attendances ==
The average attendance per top-flight football league season and the club with the highest average attendance:

Season	League average	Best club	Best club average
2025	30,024	AIK	30,024
2024	28,589	AIK	28,589
2023	25,740	AIK	25,740
2022	26,372	Hammarby IF	26,372
2021	—	—	—
2020	—	—	—
2019	24,232	Hammarby IF	24,232
2018	23,680	Hammarby IF	23,680
2017	22,137	Hammarby IF	22,137
2016	22,885	Hammarby IF	22,885
2015	25,507	Hammarby IF	25,507
2014	16,446	AIK	16,446
2013	18,900	AIK	18,900
2012	14,799	Malmö FF	14,799
2011	13,865	AIK	13,865
2010	15,194	Malmö FF	15,194
2009	17,436	AIK	17,436
2008	15,535	AIK	15,535
2007	20,465	AIK	20,465
2006	21,434	AIK	21,434
2005	15,962	Malmö FF	15,962
2004	20,061	Malmö FF	20,061
2003	18,700	Malmö FF	18,700
2002	16,551	AIK	16,551
2001	15,496	AIK	15,496
2000	14,402	AIK	14,402
1999	13,549	AIK	13,549
1998	11,112	AIK	11,112
1997	9,159	Helsingborgs IF	9,159
1996	9,671	Helsingborgs IF	9,671
1995	10,940	Helsingborgs IF	10,940
1994	8,337	Helsingborgs IF	8,337
1993	10,081	Helsingborgs IF	10,081
1992	6,197	IFK Göteborg	6,197
1991	6,933	AIK	6,933
1990	5,811	IFK Göteborg	5,811
1989	5,898	Örebro SK	5,898
1988	7,857	IFK Göteborg	7,857
1987	6,911	IFK Göteborg	6,911
1986	7,822	IFK Göteborg	7,822
1985	9,481	IFK Göteborg	9,481
1984	10,283	IFK Göteborg	10,283
1983	9,912	Hammarby IF	9,912
1982	8,905	Hammarby IF	8,905
1981	12,627	IFK Göteborg	12,627
1980	12,273	IFK Göteborg	12,273
1979	15,622	IFK Göteborg	15,622
1978	16,456	IFK Göteborg	16,456
1977	23,796	IFK Göteborg	23,796
1976	11,186	Malmö FF	11,186
1975	11,474	Malmö FF	11,474
1974	10,422	AIK	10,422
1973	10,372	GAIS	10,372
1972	12,036	AIK	12,036
1971	16,383	Malmö FF	16,383
1970	13,036	Malmö FF	13,036
1969	18,997	IFK Göteborg	18,997
1968	15,492	Östers IF	15,492
1967	13,419	Malmö FF	13,419
1966	13,369	IFK Göteborg	13,369
1965	15,817	AIK	15,817
1964	18,529	Örgryte IS	18,529
1963	17,624	AIK	17,624
1962	18,924	IFK Göteborg	18,924
1961	19,959	IFK Göteborg	19,959
1960	19,097	Örgryte IS	19,097
1959	25,490	Örgryte IS	25,490
1957-58	16,298	IFK Göteborg	16,298
1956-57	15,559	IFK Göteborg	15,559
1955-56	17,402	AIK	17,402
1954-55	19,010	Djurgårdens IF	19,010
1953-54	20,746	AIK	20,746
1952-53	14,860	Djurgårdens IF	14,860
1951-52	17,584	IFK Göteborg	17,584
1950-51	18,902	Djurgårdens IF	18,902
1949-50	21,755	AIK	21,755
1948-49	19,636	AIK	19,636
1947-48	19,184	AIK	19,184
1946-47	19,949	AIK	19,949
1945-46	15,376	AIK	15,376
1944-45	11,322	IFK Göteborg	11,322
1943-44	14,234	AIK	14,234
1942-43	10,058	AIK	10,058
1941-42	9,692	IFK Göteborg	9,692
1940-41	8,708	AIK	8,708
1939-40	8,291	AIK	8,291
1938-39	12,609	AIK	12,609
1937-38	17,196	AIK	17,196
1936-37	14,948	AIK	14,948
1935-36	15,198	AIK	15,198
1934-35	15,329	AIK	15,329
1933-34	14,553	AIK	14,553
1932-33	15,942	AIK	15,942
1931-32	17,728	AIK	17,728
1930-31	15,856	AIK	15,856
1929-30	15,997	AIK	15,997
1928-29	9,513	IFK Göteborg	9,513
1927-28	8,218	Örgryte IS	8,218
1926-27	8,211	IFK Göteborg	8,211
1925-26	6,889	Örgryte IS	6,889
1924-25	6,299	Örgryte IS	6,299

== See also ==
- Football in Stockholm
- List of football stadiums in Sweden
