= Nosaby =

Village in Kristianstad Municipality, Sweden

Coordinates: 56°3′0″N 14°11′0″E

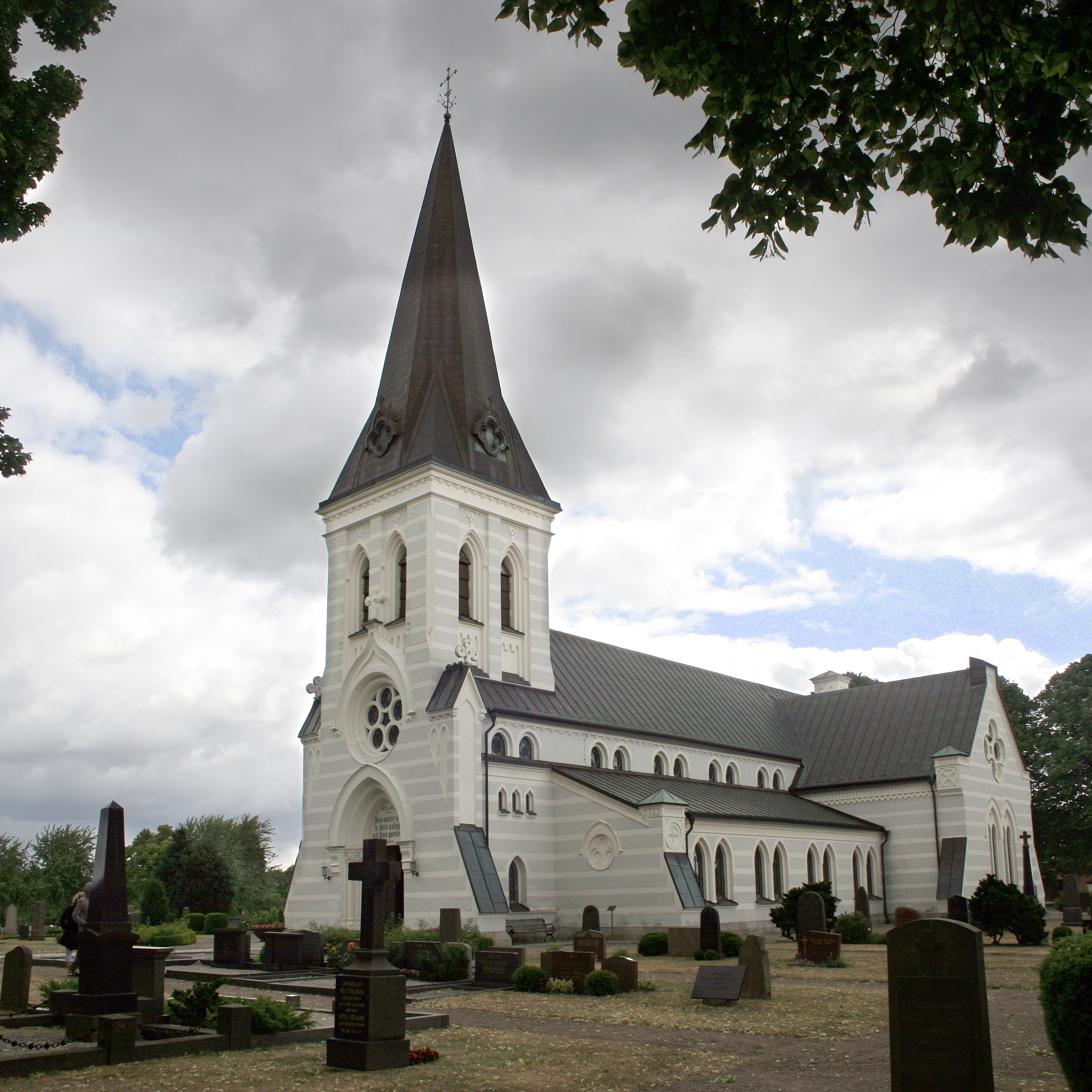
Nosaby Church (June 2008)

Nosaby is a village located in Kristianstad Municipality, Sweden. The clubs Nosaby IF and Nosaby GK are located here. The village is famous for a rail accident on 10 September 2004.
