= Jakob Lindström =

Swedish footballer

Personal information
- Full name: Carl Jakob Gustaf Lindström
- Date of birth: 14 June 1993 (age 33)
- Height: 1.75 m (5 ft 9 in)
- Position: Midfielder

Team information
- Current team: Ahlafors
- Number: 20

Youth career
- Ahlafors
- Örgryte

Senior career*
Years	Team	Apps	(Gls)
2011–2016	Örgryte	143	(13)
2017	Häcken	4	(0)
2018–2019	Örgryte	49	(3)
2020–2023	Fredrikstad	55	(3)
2023–	Ahlafors	26	(1)
- * Club domestic league appearances and goals as of 30 November 2023

Carl Jakob Gustaf Lindström (born 14 June 1993) is a Swedish football midfielder who plays for Ahlafors.

== Career ==
Progressing through the Ahlafors IF youth department, he joined Örgryte IS' youth setup at the age of 14. After breaking through in the first team, he transferred to fellow Gothenburg team BK Häcken ahead of the 2017 Allsvenskan season. He played 4 Allsvenskan games. He returned to Örgryte on a two-year contract, and after two seasons he went on to Norwegian third-tier club Fredrikstad FK.
