= Nosaby IF =

Swedish football club

- Full name: Nosaby Idrottsförening
- Founded: 1956
- Ground: Nya Vallbjörka; Kristianstad; Sweden
- Capacity: 1,000
- Chairman: Sven-Erik Olsson
- Coach: Matte Andersson
- League: Division 2 Östra Götaland
- 2020: Division 2 Östra Götaland, 4th
Home colours	Away colours

Nosaby IF is a Swedish football club located in Nosaby in Kristianstad, Skåne County.

== Background ==
Nosaby Idrottsförening was formed in 1956. Their first home ground was Vallbjörka, which was located between Balsbyvägen and the Nosaby canal and had previously been used by Araslövs IK, a club that existed between 1933 and 1954. Upon Nosaby IF's foundation, they immediately planned on building a new ground. Nosaby made their debut in the Swedish league system in 1959 and moved to Nya Vallbjörka a year later. Until 1997, they had always played in the two lowest divisions organised by Skånes Fotbollförbund. From 1996 to 1999, starting at the bottom of the league system, Nosaby achieved three promotions in four seasons and qualified for Division 4, the highest of the divisions organised at district level. In 2006, they were promoted to Division 3 and thus qualified to play in the leagues organised by the Swedish Football Association for the first time. They were promoted to Division 2 in 2013 but were relegated again after two seasons. They were promoted back to Division 2 in 2017. In 2020 Nosaby defeated Kristianstad FC by 3–1 in the first ever league derby between the two clubs; the result also ensured that Nosaby would finish higher than their rivals in the league, making them the best team in the city for the first time. They went on to finish 4th in the division, securing their best league season in history.

The club has more than 500 members of which over 300 are young people who participate in the club's 15 youth teams. They play their home matches at the Nya Vallbjörka in Kristianstad. Nosaby IF are affiliated to Skånes Fotbollförbund.

== Season to season ==
Season	Level	Division	Section	Position	Movements
1999	Tier 6	Division 5	Skåne Nordöstra	1st	Promoted
2000	Tier 5	Division 4	Skåne Norra	5th	
2001	Tier 5	Division 4	Skåne Östra	3rd	Promotion playoffs
2002	Tier 5	Division 4	Skåne Norra	9th	Relegation playoffs
2003	Tier 5	Division 4	Skåne Norra	3rd	Promotion playoffs
2004	Tier 5	Division 4	Skåne Östra	5th	
2005	Tier 5	Division 4	Skåne Östra	8th	
2006*	Tier 6	Division 4	Skåne Norra	2nd	Promoted
2007	Tier 5	Division 3	Sydöstra Götaland	3rd	
2008	Tier 5	Division 3	Sydöstra Götaland	4th	
2009	Tier 5	Division 3	Södra Götaland	3rd	
2010	Tier 5	Division 3	Södra Götaland	3rd	
2011	Tier 5	Division 3	Södra Götaland	6th	
2012	Tier 5	Division 3	Sydöstra Götaland	7th	
2013	Tier 5	Division 3	Södra Götaland	2nd	Promotion playoffs – promoted
2014	Tier 4	Division 2	Östra Götaland	12th	Relegation playoffs
2015	Tier 4	Division 2	Södra Götaland	14th	Relegated
2016	Tier 5	Division 3	Södra Götaland	6th	
2017	Tier 5	Division 3	Södra Götaland	1st	Promoted
2018	Tier 4	Division 2	Östra Götaland	5th	
2019	Tier 4	Division 2	Östra Götaland	8th	
2020	Tier 4	Division 2	Östra Götaland	4th	
2021	Tier 4	Division 2	Södra Götaland	12th	
2022	Tier 4	Division 2	Södra Götaland	5th	
2023	Tier 4	Division 2	Södra Götaland	11th	
2024	Tier 4	Division 2	Södra Götaland	11th	
2025	Tier 4	Division 2	Södra Götaland	9th	
2026	Tier 4	Division 2	Södra Götaland	4th	

* League restructuring in 2006 resulted in a new division being created at Tier 3 and subsequent divisions dropping a level.

== Coaches ==
- Tommy Lindgren (1997–2000)
- Janne Pettersson (2001)
- Alf Axelsson (2002, sacked in July)
- Tommy Lindgren (2002)
- Stefan "Messer" Andersson (2003–2004)
- Anders Svahn (2005–2008)
- Marek Skurczynski (2009–2010)
- Hampus Frank (2011–2012)
- Fredrik Johansson (2013–2015)
- Peter Persson (2016–2018)
- Christian Folin (2019)
- Stefan Liljegren (2020)
- Besnik Llazani (2021, resigned in September)
- Matte Andersson (2021–present)

== Attendances ==
In recent seasons Nosaby IF have had the following average attendances:

Season	Average attendance	Division / Section	Level
2006	Not available	Div 4 Skåne Norra	Tier 6
2007	225	Div 3 Sydöstra Götaland	Tier 5
2008	229	Div 3 Sydöstra Götaland	Tier 5
2009	151	Div 3 Södra Götaland	Tier 5
2010	134	Div 3 Södra Götaland	Tier 5

* Attendances are provided in the Publikliga sections of the Svenska Fotbollförbundet website.
