= Hampus Näsström =

Swedish footballer

Personal information
- Full name: Gunnar Hampus Näsström
- Date of birth: 18 December 1994 (age 31)
- Height: 1.90 m (6 ft 3 in)
- Position: Centre-back

Team information
- Current team: Klaksvíkar Ítróttarfelag
- Number: 25

Youth career
- Smedby AIS

Senior career*
Years	Team	Apps	(Gls)
2013–2014	Smedby AIS	19	(1)
2015	Lindö FF	20	(2)
2016–2017	IK Sleipner	41	(3)
2018–2021	IF Sylvia	107	(4)
2022–2024	IFK Värnamo	76	(3)
2025–2026	Landskrona BoIS	25	(1)
2026–	Klaksvíkar Ítróttarfelag	9	(0)
- * Club domestic league appearances and goals as of 1 November 2026

Hampus Näsström (born 18 December 1994) is a Swedish footballer who plays as a centre-back for Faroe Islands Premier League club Klaksvíkar Ítróttarfelag.

== Career ==
Näsström started his youth career in Smedby AIS and played senior football for them until 2014. Then followed three seasons in Lindö FF and IK Sleipner. He got 18 games in the Division 1 with Sleipner, and eventually three seasons in Division 1 with IF Sylvia. Eventually, a transfer to a larger club was discussed.

Ahead of the 2022 season Näsström trained with IFK Norrköping, but eventually transferred to Allsvenskan newcomers IFK Värnamo. His path to the highest tier in Sweden has been described as grinding and "gnawing", but also "romantic", showcasing that it is possible to make the leap even well into one's twenties.

He made his Allsvenskan debut in April 2022 against IFK Göteborg. His first Allsvenskan goal came in July 2023 against Degerfors. Following the end of his two-year contract, he extended it further. After that contract expired at the end of 2024, Näsström went without a club for a few months before signing with Landskrona BoIS as a replacement for the long-term injured Andreas Murbeck.

== Personal life ==
Näsström is nicknamed "Näsa".
