= Smedby AIS =

Swedish football club

- Full name: Smedby Allmänna Idrottssällskap
- Nickname: SAIS
- Founded: 1929
- Ground: PreZero Arena, Norrköping, Sweden
- Capacity: 2,500
- Chairman: Håkan Liljeblad
- Head coach: Mats Olsson
- League: 2019 Nordöstra Götaland
- 2019: Division 3 Nordöstra Götaland, 2nd (Promotion Playoffs – Not Promoted)
Home colours	Away colours

Smedby AIS is a Swedish football club located in Norrköping.

== Background ==
Smedby AIS (or SAIS for short) is a football club from southeast Norrköping based in the district of Smedby. The club was founded on 3 October 1929 and played in the third tier of Swedish football for the first time in 1961 and again in 1967–70, 1978, 1980–81 and 2003.

Since their foundation Smedby AIS has participated mainly in the lower divisions of the Swedish football league system. The club currently plays in Division 2 Södra Svealand which is the fourth tier of Swedish football. They play their home matches at the PreZero Arena in Norrköping.

Smedby AIS are affiliated to the Östergötlands Fotbollförbund. With an active youth section the club has over 1,500 members and has produced players like Hasan Cetinkaya, Niclas Fredriksson, Linus Hellman, Christos Christoforidis and Hampus Näsström.

== Season to season ==
Season	Level	Division	Section	Position	Movements
1993	Tier 4	Division 3	Nordöstra Götaland	10th	Relegated
1994	Tier 5	Division 4	Östergötland Östra	1st	Promoted
1995	Tier 4	Division 3	Nordöstra Götaland	4th	
1996	Tier 4	Division 3	Nordöstra Götaland	10th	Relegated
1997	Tier 5	Division 4	Östergötland Östra	3rd	
1998	Tier 5	Division 4	Östergötland Östra	7th	
1999	Tier 5	Division 4	Östergötland Östra	2nd	
2000	Tier 5	Division 4	Östergötland Östra	2nd	Promotion Playoffs – Promoted
2001	Tier 4	Division 3	Nordöstra Götaland	9th	Relegation Playoffs
2002	Tier 4	Division 3	Nordöstra Götaland	1st	Promoted
2003	Tier 3	Division 2	Östra Svealand	12th	Relegated
2004	Tier 4	Division 3	Västra Svealand	9th	Relegation Playoffs – Relegated
2005	Tier 5	Division 4	Östergötland Östra	1st	Promoted
2006*	Tier 5	Division 3	Nordöstra Götaland	1st	Promoted
2007	Tier 4	Division 2	Mellersta Götaland	5th	
2008	Tier 4	Division 2	Östra Götaland	4th	
2009	Tier 4	Division 2	Östra Götaland	2nd	
2010	Tier 4	Division 2	Södra Svealand	8th	
2011	Tier 4	Division 2	Södra Svealand	11th	Relegated
2012	Tier 5	Division 3	Nordöstra Götaland	1st	Promoted
2013	Tier 4	Division 2	Södra Svealand	7th	
2014	Tier 4	Division 2	Södra Svealand	12th	Relegation Playoffs – Relegated
2015	Tier 5	Division 3	Nordöstra Götaland	1st	Promoted
2016	Tier 4	Division 2	Södra Svealand	13th	Relegated
2017	Tier 5	Division 3	Nordöstra Götaland	7th	
2018	Tier 5	Division 3	Nordöstra Götaland	2nd	Promotion Playoffs – Not Promoted
2019	Tier 5	Division 3	Nordöstra Götaland	2nd	Promotion Playoffs – Not Promoted
2020	Tier 5	Division 3	Nordöstra Götaland	2nd	Promotion Playoffs – Promoted
2021	Tier 4	Division 2	Södra Svealand	8th	
2022	Tier 4	Division 2	Södra Svealand	6th	
2023	Tier 4	Division 2	Södra Svealand	10th	
2024	Tier 4	Division 2	Södra Svealand	11th	
2025	Tier 4	Division 2	Södra Svealand		

* League restructuring in 2006 resulted in a new division being created at Tier 3 and subsequent divisions dropping a level.

== Current squad ==
As of 8 May 2024

Note: Flags indicate national team as defined under FIFA eligibility rules; some limited exceptions apply. Players may hold more than one non-FIFA nationality.

No.	Pos.	Nation	Player
1	GK	SWE	Jesper Royé
2	DF	SWE	Fred Andersson
3	DF	SWE	Theo Nordlund
4	DF	SWE	Isac Johansson
5	DF	SWE	Jakob Olsson
6	FW	SWE	Jacob Lundell
7	FW	SWE	Joakim Gunnar
8	MF	SWE	Maximilian Malm
10	FW	SWE	Amer Ibrahimovic
12	MF	SWE	Daniel Rann

No.	Pos.	Nation	Player
13	MF	SWE	Adam Rasmusson
14	DF	SWE	Kevin Fridh
15	DF	SWE	Felix Linde
16	GK	SWE	Vilgot Ederth
17	MF	SWE	Christian Saliba
18	DF	SWE	Carl Kronander
19	FW	SWE	Joel Unger
20	DF	AUS	Henry Cliff
21	DF	SWE	Simon Cakar
22	MF	SWE	Felix Larsson
23	MF	SWE	Anton Andersson
25	MF	SWE	Josef Gawreyia
30	MF	SWE	Nikola Tkalčić

== Attendances ==
In recent seasons Smedby AIS have had the following average attendances:

Season	Average attendance	Division / Section	Level
2005	Not available	Div 4 Östergötland Östra	Tier 5
2006	106	Div 3 Nordöstra Götaland	Tier 5
2007	121	Div 2 Mellersta Götaland	Tier 4
2008	124	Div 2 Östra Götaland	Tier 4
2009	99	Div 2 Östra Götaland	Tier 4
2010	114	Div 2 Södra Svealand	Tier 4
2011	173	Div 2 Södra Svealand	Tier 4
2012	124	Div 3 Nordöstra Götaland	Tier 5
2013	138	Div 2 Södra Svealand	Tier 4
2014	126	Div 2 Södra Svealand	Tier 4
2015	119	Div 3 Nordöstra Götaland	Tier 5
2016	161	Div 2 Södra Svealand	Tier 4
2017	158	Div 3 Nordöstra Götaland	Tier 5
2018	136	Div 3 Nordöstra Götaland	Tier 5
2019	?	Div 3 Nordöstra Götaland	Tier 5
2020		Div 3 Nordöstra Götaland	Tier 5

* Attendances are provided in the Publikliga sections of the Svenska Fotbollförbundet website.
