= Liam Jordan =

South African soccer player (born 1998)

Personal information
- Full name: Liam Jonathan Jordan
- Date of birth: 30 July 1998 (age 28)
- Place of birth: Durban, South Africa
- Height: 1.72 m (5 ft 8 in)
- Positions: Forward; winger

Team information
- Current team: Piteå
- Number: 28

Youth career
- 2013–2014: Auckland City
- 2014–2015: Bidvest Wits

Senior career*
Years	Team	Apps	(Gls)
2015–2017	Bidvest Wits	0	(0)
2016–2017	→ Sporting B (loan)	0	(0)
2017–2018	Sporting B	0	(0)
2018	→ HB Køge (loan)	11	(1)
2018–2021	HB Køge	77	(13)
2021–2023	Helsingør	57	(12)
2023–2025	Brommapojkarna	8	(0)
2026–	Piteå	21	(3)

International career^{‡}
2015	South Africa U17		
2017	South Africa U20		
2017–	South Africa	4	(0)
- * Club domestic league appearances and goals as of 16 November 2026 ‡ National team caps and goals as of 09:30, 26 May 2020 (UTC)

Liam Jonathan Jordan (born 30 July 1998) is a South African professional soccer player who plays for the Ettan Fotboll club Piteå and the South Africa national team.

== Club career ==
Jordan made his professional debut on 17 March 2015 against University of Pretoria in the 2015–16 Nedbank Cup.

In January 2018, he joined HB Køge on loan from Sporting B. The move was made permanent in the summer of 2018. On transfer deadline day, 1 February 2021, Jordan moved to fellow league club FC Helsingør on a deal for the rest of the season.

On 7 March 2023, Jordan joined newly promoted Swedish Allsvenskan side IF Brommapojkarna. On 12 July 2025, IF Brommapojkarna announced that the contract with Jordan had been terminated due to injuries.

== International career ==
After representing his country at under-17 and under-20 level, Jordan made his senior international debut for South Africa on 2 July 2017 against Tanzania in the 2017 COSAFA Cup.

== Personal life ==
He is the son of Keryn Jordan, a former South African soccer player. Jordan was born during his father's time at Durban-based Manning Rangers and emigrated to New Zealand in 2004.
