= Nosaby Church =

- Nosaby kyrka
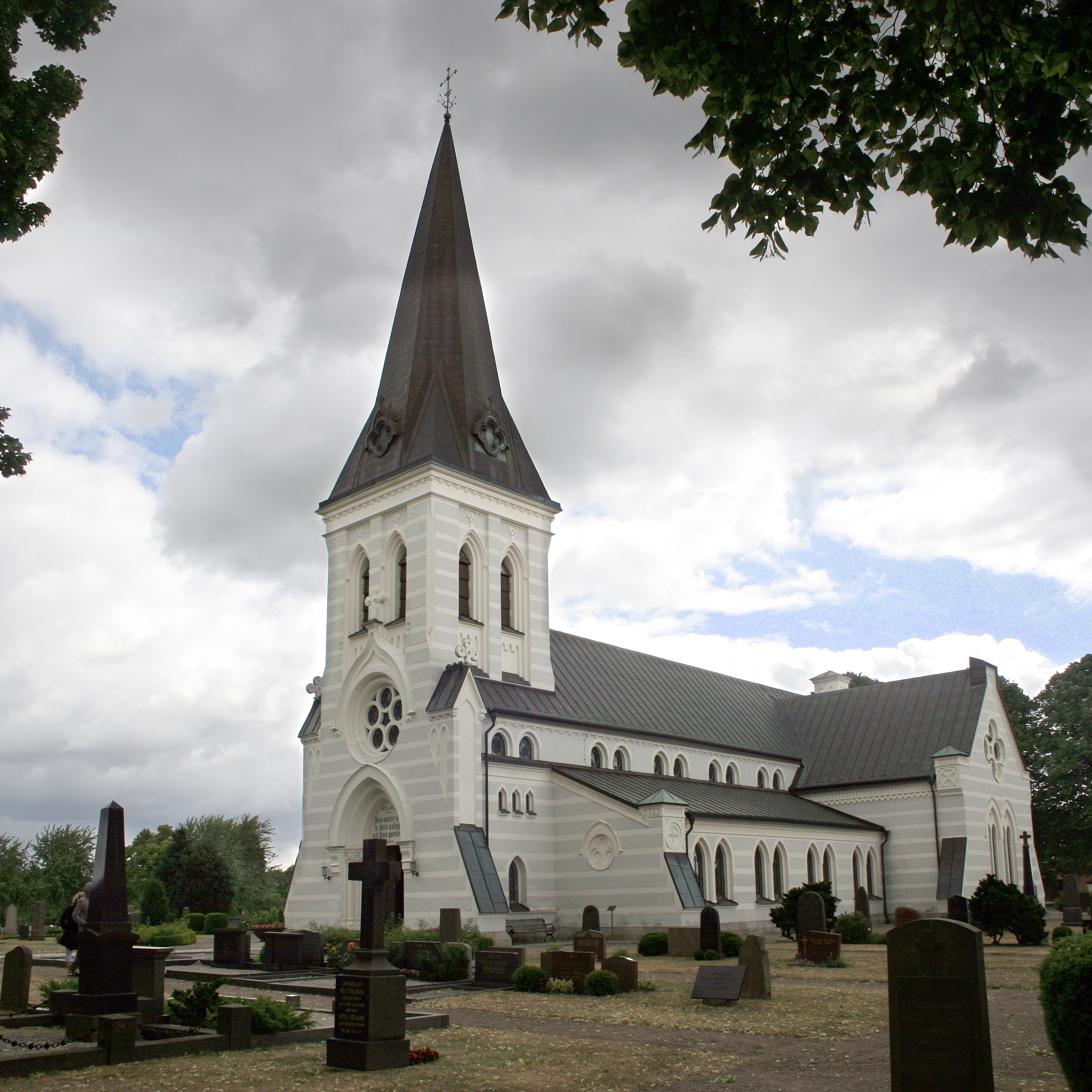
- Nosaby Church

- 56°3′0″N 14°11′0″E
- Country: Sweden
- Denomination: Church of Sweden

Nosaby Church (Swedish: Nosaby kyrka) is located in the village Nosaby in Kristianstad Municipality, Sweden.

== History ==
Before the present church was built, there was a stone church from the 12th century. The former church was too small and they wanted to build a new church. They discussed about a new church since the mid of the 12th century and first in 1871 they started build a new brick church in Gothic Revival style according to drawings by Helgo Zettervall (1831–1907) and it opened at Pentecost of 1875.
