= IK Franke =

Association football club in Sweden

- Full name: Idrottsklubben Franke
- Founded: 1943; 82 years ago
- Ground: Råby IP; Västerås; Sweden
- Chairman: Mats Arne Bertil Rudolfsson
- Head coach: Alexander Rubin
- League: Division 2 Norra Svealand
- 2024: Division 2 Norra Svealand, 6th of 14
Home colours	Away colours

IK Franke is a Swedish sports club located in Västerås in Västmanland.

== Background ==
Idrottsklubben Franke was formed in 1943 and its main activity has been football despite the initial success came in bandy when the club won the national juniors championship in 1958. At youth level the football club has fostered future national team players such as Gary Sundgren and Pontus Kåmark. In 2010 the first team has been coached by Peter Markstedt, the former Hammarby IF player.

Since their foundation IK Franke has participated mainly in the middle and lower divisions of the Swedish football league system. The men's team currently plays in Division 3 Västra Svealand which is the fifth tier of Swedish football. The women's team plays at a similar level. The teams play their home matches at the Råby IP in Västerås.

IK Franke are affiliated to the Västmanlands Fotbollförbund.

== Season to season ==
Season	Level	Division	Section	Position	Movements
1993	Tier 4	Division 3	Västra Svealand	6th	
1994	Tier 4	Division 3	Östra Svealand	9th	Relegation Playoffs – Relegated
1995	Tier 5	Division 4	Västmanland	6th	
1996	Tier 5	Division 4	Västmanland	1st	Promoted
1997	Tier 4	Division 3	Norra Svealand	9th	Relegation Playoffs – Relegated
1998	Tier 5	Division 4	Västmanland	1st	Promoted
1999	Tier 4	Division 3	Västra Svealand	8th	
2000	Tier 4	Division 3	Västra Svealand	7th	
2001	Tier 4	Division 3	Västra Svealand	8th	
2002	Tier 4	Division 3	Västra Svealand	10th	Relegated
2003	Tier 5	Division 4	Västmanland	8th	
2004	Tier 5	Division 4	Västmanland	4th	
2005	Tier 5	Division 4	Västmanland	1st	Promoted
2006*	Tier 5	Division 3	Västra Svealand	7th	
2007	Tier 5	Division 3	Västra Svealand	11th	Relegated
2008	Tier 6	Division 4	Västmanland	2nd	
2009	Tier 6	Division 4	Västmanland	1st	Promoted
2010	Tier 5	Division 3	Västra Svealand	5th	
2011	Tier 5	Division 3	Norra Svealand	4th	
2012	Tier 5	Division 3	Södra Svealand	3rd	
2013	Tier 5	Division 3	Södra Svealand	8th	
2014	Tier 5	Division 3	Västra Svealand	8th	
2015	Tier 5	Division 3	Västra Svealand	2nd	Promotion Playoffs – Promoted
2016	Tier 4	Division 2	Norra Svealand	13th	Relegated
2017	Tier 5	Division 3	Västra Svealand	4th	
2018	Tier 5	Division 3	Norra Svealand	4th	
2019	Tier 5	Division 3	Norra Svealand	5th	
2020	Tier 5	Division 3	Norra Svealand		

* League restructuring in 2006 resulted in a new division being created at Tier 3 and subsequent divisions dropping a level.

== Attendances ==
In recent seasons IK Franke have had the following average attendances:

Season	Average attendance	Division / Section	Level
2005	Not available	Div 4 Västmanland	Tier 5
2006	110	Div 3 Västra Svealand	Tier 5
2007	115	Div 3 Västra Svealand	Tier 5
2008	Not available	Div 4 Västmanland	Tier 6
2009	Not available	Div 4 Västmanland	Tier 6
2010	120	Div 3 Västra Svealand	Tier 5
2011	87	Div 3 Norra Svealand	Tier 5
2012	99	Div 3 Södra Svealand	Tier 5
2013	94	Div 3 Södra Svealand	Tier 5
2014	94	Div 3 Västra Svealand	Tier 5
2015	?	Div 3 Västra Svealand	Tier 5
2016	208	Div 2 Norra Svealand	Tier 4
2017	119	Div 3 Västra Svealand	Tier 5
2018	108	Div 3 Norra Svealand	Tier 5
2019	?	Div 3 Norra Svealand	Tier 5
2020		Div 3 Norra Svealand	Tier 5

* Attendances are provided in the Publikliga sections of the Svenska Fotbollförbundet website.
