= Albert Ejupi =

Swedish footballer

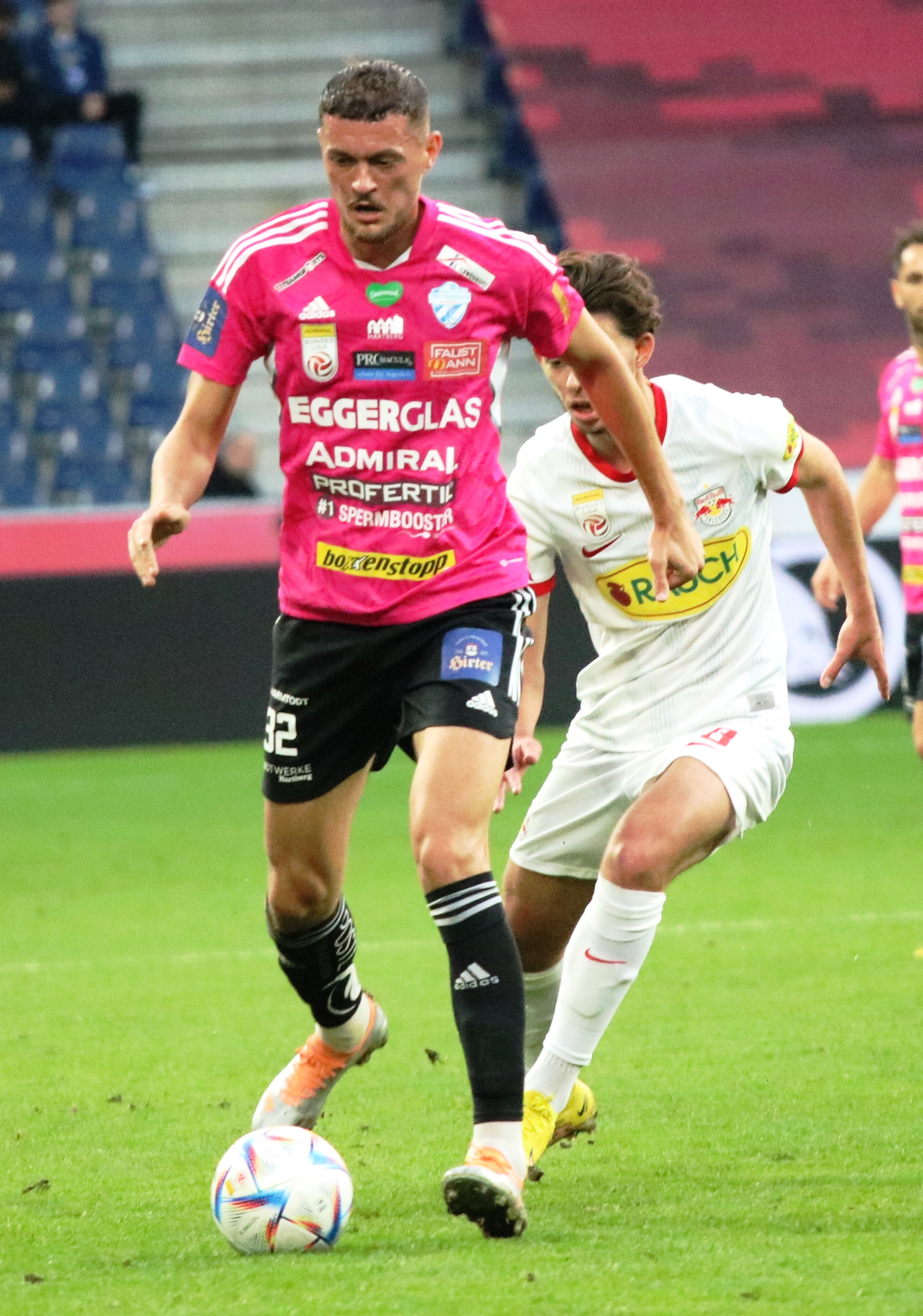
- Ejupi with TSV Hartberg in 2022

Personal information
- Date of birth: 28 August 1992 (age 34)
- Place of birth: Stockholm, Sweden
- Height: 1.91 m (6 ft 3 in)
- Position: Midfielder

Team information
- Current team: Kristianstad FC
- Number: 18

Youth career
- –2010: Kristianstad

Senior career*
Years	Team	Apps	(Gls)
2010–2011	Kristianstad	10	(0)
2012–2013	Sölvesborg	40	(2)
2014–2015	Kristianstad	48	(4)
2016	Mjällby	19	(0)
2017	Kristianstad	20	(4)
2018–2022	Varberg	59	(8)
2022	Helsingborg	10	(0)
2022–2023	TSV Hartberg	10	(0)
2023	Hapoel Hadera	10	(0)
2023–2024	Horsens	16	(0)
2024	Næstved	0	(0)
2024	KÍ Klaksvík	12	(0)
2025–2026	Oddevold	13	(1)
2026–	Kristianstad	20	(0)
- * Club domestic league appearances and goals as of 16 November 2026

Albert Ejupi (born 28 August 1992) is a Swedish footballer who plays as a midfielder for Kristianstad FC.

== Career ==
=== Varbergs BoIS ===
Prior to the 2018 season, Ejupi joined the club on a free transfer. Following Varbergs BoIS' promotion to the Allsvenskan prior to the 2020 season, Ejupi made his top-flight debut on 15 June 2020, playing the entirety of a 3–0 away victory over Helsingborg.

=== Helsingborgs IF ===
Ejupi joined Helsingborgs IF in the Allsvenskan in March 2022.

=== TSV Hartberg ===
On 10 June 2022, Ejupi signed a two-year contract with TSV Hartberg in Austria.

=== Næstved ===
On 13 March 2024, Ejupi joined Danish 1st Division side Næstved Boldklub on a short-term deal until the end of the season.

=== KÍ Klaksvík ===
On 2 June 2024, Ejupi joined Faroe Islands Premier League club KÍ Klaksvík.

== Personal life ==
Born in Sweden, Ejupi is of Kosovan descent.
