= Landvetter IS =

Swedish football club

- Full name: Landvetter Idrottssällskap
- Nickname: LIS
- Founded: 1931
- Ground: Landvetter IP; Landvetter; Sweden
- League: Division 2 Västra Götaland
Home colours

Landvetter IS is a Swedish football club located in Landvetter, in Västra Götaland County.

== Background ==
Landvetter IS currently (2026) plays in Division 2 Västra Götaland which is the fifth tier of Swedish football. Since 2012, they play their home matches at the Landvetter IP in Landvetter. Previously, they played at Landevi IP.

The club is affiliated to Göteborgs Fotbollförbund. As of 2011, Landvetter IS had competed in the Svenska Cupen on 13 occasions and had played 26 matches in the competition. They played IFK Göteborg in the 2017–18 Svenska Cupen and lost 0–5 at home in the second round in front of 4,220 attendants, a club record.

== Season to season ==
Season	Level	Division	Section	Position	Movements
2006*	Tier 6	Division 4	Göteborg A	5th	
2007	Tier 6	Division 4	Göteborg A	5th	
2008	Tier 6	Division 4	Göteborg A	2nd	
2009	Tier 6	Division 4	Göteborg A	2nd	
2010	Tier 6	Division 4	Göteborg A	9th	
2011	Tier 6	Division 4	Göteborg A	10th	
2012	Tier 6	Division 4	Göteborg B	5th	
2013	Tier 6	Division 4	Göteborg B	4th	
2014	Tier 6	Division 4	Göteborg B	10th	
2015	Tier 6	Division 4	Göteborg B	2nd	Promoted to Division 3
2016	Tier 5	Division 3	Nordvästra Götaland	3rd	
2017	Tier 5	Division 3	Nordvästra Götaland	5th	
2018	Tier 5	Division 3	Nordvästra Götaland	5th	
2019	Tier 5	Division 3	Nordvästra Götaland	2nd	
2020	Tier 5	Division 3	Mellersta Götaland	9th	
2021	Tier 5	Division 3	Mellersta Götaland	2nd	Promoted to Division 2
2022	Tier 4	Division 2	Västra Götaland	10th	
2023	Tier 4	Division 2	Västra Götaland	10th	
2024	Tier 4	Division 2	Västra Götaland	5th	
2025	Tier 4	Division 2	Västra Götaland	10th	

* League restructuring in 2006 resulted in a new division being created at Tier 3 and subsequent divisions dropping a level.
