= Kristianstad FC =

Swedish football club

- Full name: 1614 Kristianstad Football Club
- Short name: KFC
- Founded: 2015; 11 years ago
- Ground: Kristianstad Fotbollsarena, Kristianstad
- Capacity: ~2,500
- Chairman: Andreas Andersson
- Head coach: Adam Larsson
- League: Ettan Södra
- 2026: Ettan Södra, 12th of 16
- Website: www.svenskalag.se/kristianstadfc
Home colours	Away colours

Kristianstad FC is a Swedish football club located in Kristianstad. The club was formed in 2015 through a merger between Kristianstads FF and Kristianstad BoIS. The club is currently playing in Ettan, the third tier of Swedish football.

== History ==
IFK Kristianstad

The football section of IFK Kristianstad was founded in 1899 and played several seasons in the 2nd highest football division of Sweden.

Kristianstads IS

Kristianstads Idrottssällskap (Kristianstad Sports Association) was founded in 1929 and refounded in 1995.

Vilans BoIF

Vilans Boll- och Idrottsförening (Vilans Football and Sports Association) was a football club from Vilan, a city district of Kristianstad. The club was founded on 27 June 1932 and was the successor to the predecessor club Vilans IF, which was founded in 1924 and dissolved in 1931.

Kristianstads BI

Kristiandstads Boll- och idrottssällskap (Kristiandstads Football and Sports Association) was founded in 1933. In the year 1970 they finished second Place in the Division III, above Vilans BoIF and IFK Kristianstad and were therefore the best football club in Kristianstad in that year.

Kristianstads FF

Kristianstads FF was founded in 1990, when the football section of IFK Kristianstad merged with Vilans BoIF. The club then began life in Division 3 Sydöstra Götaland, which was the fourth tier of Swedish football. In the first few seasons Kristianstads FF finished in mid-table positions but then won promotion at the end of the 1993 season after finishing top of the Division 3 Sydöstra Götaland.

The club established themselves in Division 2 Södra Götaland over the next four seasons before winning the division in 1998. There followed one season in Division 1 Södra in 1999 where the club finished in ninth position and were most unfortunate to be relegated at the end of the campaign as a result of league re-structuring. The club's confidence dipped in Division 2 Södra Götaland and a further relegation followed at the end of the 2001 season.

However the club were promoted from Division 3 Sydöstra Götaland in 2002 after finishing in second place. Over the rest of the decade the club has played in Division 1 Södra and Division 2 Södra Götaland where they currently reside.

Kristianstads FF Women

The women team of Kristianstads FF played in 1992 and 1994 in the Division 1 Södra, the second highest level of Swedish women's football. On 5 November 1998, the team merged with the women team of Wä IF to form Kristianstad/Wä DFF, that was renamed in 2006 to Kristianstads DFF. Kristianstads DFF plays in the Damallsvenskan, the highest division of Women's football in Sweden.

Kristianstad BoIS

Kristianstads Boll- och Idrottssällskap (Kristianstad Football and Sports Association) was founded on 20 January 2008 through a fusion of Kristianstads BI and Kristianstads IS. They retained the club name of Kristianstads BI, but changed their shorter name to Kristianstad BoIS to differentiate the funsioned club to the older club.

Kristianstad FC

Kristianstad FC was founded on 10 December 2015 through a merger of Kristianstad BoIS and Kristianstads FF.

The club is affiliated to the Skånes Fotbollförbund.

== Players ==
=== First-team squad ===
As of 5 September 2026

Note: Flags indicate national team as defined under FIFA eligibility rules; some limited exceptions apply. Players may hold more than one non-FIFA nationality.

No.	Pos.	Nation	Player
2	DF	SWE	William Klevendal
3	DF	SWE	Linus Svensson (captain)
5	DF	SWE	Viktor Agardius
6	DF	SWE	Kasper Alsén
7	DF	SWE	Samuel Wikström
8	MF	SWE	André Kamp
9	FW	SWE	Omar Dampha
10	MF	SWE	Tim Ströbeck
11	FW	SWE	Paolo Lilja
14	MF	SWE	Albin Henningsson
15	DF	SWE	Alexander Hughes
16	DF	SWE	Viggo Asterman Fridman

No.	Pos.	Nation	Player
17	FW	SWE	Elias Karimi
18	MF	SWE	Albert Ejupi
19	MF	SWE	Svante Svedin
20	FW	POL	Paweł Chrupałła
21	DF	SWE	Vilmer Lindberg
22	MF	SWE	Oscar Fisch
24	MF	SWE	Kimmen Nennesson (on loan from Mjällby)
25	MF	SWE	Oskar Kronvall
30	GK	SWE	Max Softberg
40	GK	SWE	Vilmer Leffler
50	GK	SWE	Otto Larsson Wågert

=== Youth players with first-team experience ===
As of 5 September 2026 (Note: Current youth players who at least have sat on the bench in a competitive match)

Note: Flags indicate national team as defined under FIFA eligibility rules; some limited exceptions apply. Players may hold more than one non-FIFA nationality.

No.	Pos.	Nation	Player
—	GK	SWE	Ebbe Nygren
—	DF	SWE	Halis Dzamdzic
—	DF	SWE	Isak Eng
—	DF	SWE	Hjalmar Larsson Wågert
—	DF	SWE	Filip Lindbladh
—	DF	SWE	Vilde Ramstedt
—	DF	SWE	William Rubin
—	DF	SWE	Anton Svensson

No.	Pos.	Nation	Player
—	MF	SWE	Yacqub Abdulle
—	MF	SWE	Sixten Asterman Fridman
—	MF	SWE	Arvid Björkholm
—	MF	SWE	Emil Månsson
—	MF	SWE	Jesper Torp
—	FW	SWE	Lucas Bladh
—	FW	SWE	Sixten Öien

== Season to season ==
Season	Level	Division	Section	Position	Movements
Kristianstads FF
1990	Tier 4	Division 3	Sydöstra Götaland	6th	
1991	Tier 4	Division 3	Södra Götaland	7th	
1992	Tier 4	Division 3	Sydöstra Götaland	2nd	
1993	Tier 4	Division 3	Sydöstra Götaland	1st	Promoted
1994	Tier 3	Division 2	Södra Götaland	7th	
1995	Tier 3	Division 2	Södra Götaland	5th	
1996	Tier 3	Division 2	Södra Götaland	7th	
1997	Tier 3	Division 2	Södra Götaland	5th	
1998	Tier 3	Division 2	Södra Götaland	1st	Promoted
1999	Tier 2	Division 1	Södra	9th	Relegated
2000	Tier 3	Division 2	Södra Götaland	9th	
2001	Tier 3	Division 2	Södra Götaland	11th	Relegated
2002	Tier 4	Division 3	Sydöstra Götaland	2nd	Promoted
2003	Tier 3	Division 2	Södra Götaland	5th	
2004	Tier 3	Division 2	Södra Götaland	7th	
2005	Tier 3	Division 2	Södra Götaland	2nd	Promoted
2006*	Tier 3	Division 1	Södra	6th	
2007	Tier 3	Division 1	Södra	13th	Relegated
2008	Tier 4	Division 2	Södra Götaland	1st	Promoted
2009	Tier 3	Division 1	Södra	4th	
2010	Tier 3	Division 1	Södra	10th	
2011	Tier 3	Division 1	Södra	6th	
2012	Tier 3	Division 1	Södra	4th	
2013	Tier 3	Division 1	Södra	11th	
2014	Tier 3	Division 1	Södra	10th	
2015	Tier 3	Division 1	Södra	5th	
Kristianstad FC
2016	Tier 3	Division 1	Södra	5th	
2017	Tier 3	Division 1	Södra	4th	
2018	Tier 3	Division 1	Södra	12th	
2019	Tier 3	Division 1	Södra	15th	Relegated
2020	Tier 4	Division 2	Östra Götaland	11th	
2021	Tier 4	Division 2	Södra Götaland	10th	
2022	Tier 4	Division 2	Södra Götaland	8th	
2023	Tier 4	Division 2	Södra Götaland	7th	
2024	Tier 4	Division 2	Södra Götaland	2nd	
2025	Tier 4	Division 2	Södra Götaland	1st	Promoted

* League restructuring in 2006 resulted in a new division being created at Tier 3 and subsequent divisions dropping a level.

== Managers ==
- (Sweden) Joakim Persson (Nov 4, 2015 – Sep 22, 2017)
- (Iceland) Atli Eðvaldsson (Sep 22, 2017 – Jan 15, 2018)
- (Turkey) Serdar Dayat (Jan 15, 2018 – May 22, 2018)
- (Sweden) Besnik Llazani (May 22, 2018 – May 2, 2019)
- (Sweden) Joacim Velander (May 2, 2019 – October 17, 2019)
- (Sweden) Pierre Ferreira (October 17, 2019 – November 27, 2019)
- (Denmark) Jack Majgaard Jensen (November 27, 2019 – December 13, 2019)
- (Sweden) Anders Swahn (January 9, 2020 – November 18, 2020)
- (Serbia) Mladen Blagojevic (November 18, 2020 – November 10, 2024)
- (Sweden) Mattias Asper (December 8, 2024 – December 31, 2025)
- (Sweden) Adam Larsson (January 1, 2026 – )
