= Ahlafors IF =

Swedish football club

- Full name: Ahlafors Idrottsförening
- Nickname: AIF
- Founded: 1913
- Ground: Svenska Stenhus Arena 1 Nödinge-Nol; Ale Municipality; Sweden
- Chairman: Claes Berglund
- Head coach: Lars-Gunnar Hermansson
- Coach: Michel Berndtson Gonzalez; Ola Holmgren
- League: Division 2 Norra Götaland
- 2019: Division 3 Mellersta Götaland, 1st (Promoted)
Home colours

Ahlafors IF is a Swedish football club located in Nödinge-Nol in Ale Municipality, Västra Götaland County.

== Background ==
Ahlafors Idrottsförening were founded in 1913 and currently have around 800 members. Ahlafors IF manage Furulundsparken, a cosy folk park with a nostalgic feel, where the club arranges many dances and parties. In 2007 the club constructed a brand new miniature golf course, assisted by the former Swedish national golf player, Lars Albinsson.

Since their foundation Ahlafors IF has participated mainly in the middle and lower divisions of the Swedish football league system. The club currently (2017) plays in Division 3 Nordvästra Götaland which is the fifth tier of Swedish football. They play their home matches at the Svenska Stenhus Arena 1 (Sjövallen) in Alafors, Nödinge-Nol.

Ahlafors IF are affiliated to Göteborgs Fotbollförbund.

== Recent history ==
In recent seasons Ahlafors IF have competed in the following divisions:

2022 – Division II, Nordvästra Götaland
2021 – Division II, Nordvästra Götaland
2020 – Division III, Nordvästra Götaland
2019 – Division III, Nordvästra Götaland
2018 – Division III, Nordvästra Götaland
2017 – Division III, Nordvästra Götaland
2016 – Division III, Nordvästra Götaland
2015 – Division III, Nordvästra Götaland
2014 – Division III, Nordvästra Götaland
2013 – Division III, Nordvästra Götaland
2012 – Division III, Nordvästra Götaland
2011 – Division III, Nordvästra Götaland
2010 – Division III, Nordvästra Götaland
2009 – Division II, Västra Götaland
2008 – Division II, Västra Götaland
2007 – Division II, Västra Götaland
2006 – Division III, Nordvästra Götaland
2005 – Division IV, Göteborg A
2004 – Division V, Göteborg A
2003 – Division V, Göteborg A
2002 – Division VI, Göteborg A
2001 – Division V, Göteborg A
2000 – Division VI, Göteborg A
1999 – Division V, Göteborg A

== Current squad ==
As of 30 November 2023

Note: Flags indicate national team as defined under FIFA eligibility rules; some limited exceptions apply. Players may hold more than one non-FIFA nationality.

No.	Pos.	Nation	Player
1	GK	SWE	Victor Strandh
3	DF	SWE	André Josefsson
4	MF	SWE	Jesper Nilsson
5	DF	SWE	Harald Oresjö
7	FW	SWE	Jesper Zetterlund
8	MF	SWE	Daniel Tidstrand
9	FW	SWE	Oscar Samuelsson
10	MF	SWE	Pascal Olsson
11	FW	SWE	Elliot Söderberg Waltersson
13	DF	SWE	Noel Söder
14	FW	SWE	Victor Andersson
15	MF	SWE	Kristian Kocevski

No.	Pos.	Nation	Player
16	MF	SWE	Nils Strandahl
17	MF	SWE	Nuha Jatta
19	FW	SWE	Anton Millesson Nilsson
20	MF	SWE	Jakob Lindström
21	FW	SWE	Mohamed Said Adan
22	DF	SWE	Samuel Edlund
23	MF	SWE	Rasmus Hegab
26	DF	SDN	Mohamed Amin
28	MF	SWE	Hugo Söder
29	MF	SWE	Robin Clason
30	GK	SWE	Marcus Alexandersson
31	GK	SWE	Andreas Skanberg

== Attendances ==
In recent seasons Ahlafors IF have had the following average attendances:

Season	Average attendance	Division / Section	Level
2005	Not available	Div 4 Göteborg A	Tier 6
2006	132	Div 3 Nordvästra Götaland	Tier 5
2007	205	Div 2 Västra Götaland	Tier 4
2008	177	Div 2 Västra Götaland	Tier 4
2009	180	Div 2 Västra Götaland	Tier 4
2010	106	Div 3 Nordvästra Götaland	Tier 5

* Attendances are provided in the Publikliga sections of the Svenska Fotbollförbundet website.
