= Bergnäsets AIK =

Swedish football club

- Full name: Bergnäsets Allmänna Idrottsklubb
- Nickname: BAIK
- Founded: 1933; 92 years ago
- Ground: Bergsvallen; Luleå; Sweden
- Chairman: Patrik Landgren
- Head coach: Kenneth Pääjärvi
- Coach: Kenneth Pääjärvi
- League: Division 3
- 2019: Division 3 Norra Norrland, 8th
| Home colours | Away colours |

Bergnäsets AIK is a Swedish football club located in Luleå in Norrbotten County. Their home colours are green and black, and when they play away, they wear red.

== Background ==
Since their foundation Bergnäsets AIK has participated mainly in the middle and lower divisions of the Swedish football league system. The club currently plays in Division 3 Norra Norrland which is the fifth tier of Swedish football. They play their home matches at the Bergsvallen in Luleå.

Bergnäsets AIK are affiliated to the Norrbottens Fotbollförbund.

== Season to season ==
| Season | Level | Division | Section | Position | Movements |
|---|---|---|---|---|---|
| 1993 | Tier 5 | Division 4 | Norrbotten Södra | 4th | |
| 1994 | Tier 5 | Division 4 | Norrbotten Södra | 3rd | |
| 1995 | Tier 5 | Division 4 | Norrbotten Södra | 1st | Promoted |
| 1996 | Tier 4 | Division 3 | Norra Norrland | 12th | Relegated |
| 1997 | Tier 5 | Division 4 | Norrbotten Södra | 4th | |
| 1998 | Tier 5 | Division 4 | Norrbotten Södra | 3rd | |
| 1999 | Tier 5 | Division 4 | Norrbotten Södra | 2nd | |
| 2000 | Tier 5 | Division 4 | Norrbotten Norra | 4th | |
| 2001 | Tier 5 | Division 4 | Norrbotten Södra | 12th | Relegated |
| 2002 | Tier 6 | Division 5 | Norrbotten Mellersta | 3rd | |
| 2003 | Tier 6 | Division 5 | Norrbotten Mellersta | 2nd | Promoted |
| 2004 | Tier 5 | Division 4 | Norrbotten Södra | 8th | Relegation Playoffs |
| 2005 | Tier 5 | Division 4 | Norrbotten Södra | 6th | |
| 2006* | Tier 6 | Division 4 | Norrbotten Södra | 6th | |
| 2007 | Tier 6 | Division 4 | Norrbotten Södra | 2nd | Promotion Playoffs |
| 2008 | Tier 6 | Division 4 | Norrbotten Södra | 1st | Promotion Playoffs – Promoted |
| 2009 | Tier 5 | Division 3 | Norra Norrland | 12th | Relegated |
| 2010 | Tier 6 | Division 4 | Norrbotten Södra | 1st | Promoted |
| 2011 | Tier 5 | Division 3 | Norra Norrland | 11th | Relegated |
| 2012 | Tier 6 | Division 4 | Norrbotten Södra | 1st | Promoted |
| 2013 | Tier 5 | Division 3 | Norra Norrland | 7th | |
| 2014 | Tier 5 | Division 3 | Norra Norrland | 1st | Promoted |
| 2015 | Tier 4 | Division 2 | Norrland | 13th | Relegated |
| 2016 | Tier 5 | Division 3 | Norra Norrland | 2nd | Promotion Playoffs - Not Promoted |
| 2017 | Tier 5 | Division 3 | Norra Norrland | 3rd | |
| 2018 | Tier 5 | Division 3 | Norra Norrland | 8th | |
| 2019 | Tier 5 | Division 3 | Norra Norrland | 8th | |
| 2020 | Tier 5 | Division 3 | Norra Norrland | | |

* League restructuring in 2006 resulted in a new division being created at Tier 3 and subsequent divisions dropping a level.

== Attendances ==
In recent seasons Bergnäsets AIK have had the following average attendances:

| Season | Average attendance | Division / Section | Level |
|---|---|---|---|
| 2008 | Not available | Div 4 Norrbotten Södra | Tier 6 |
| 2009 | 118 | Div 3 Norra Norrland | Tier 5 |
| 2010 | 44 | Div 4 Norrbotten Södra | Tier 6 |
| 2011 | 133 | Div 3 Norra Norrland | Tier 5 |
| 2012 | 39 | Div 4 Norrbotten Norra | Tier 6 |
| 2013 | 69 | Div 3 Norra Norrland | Tier 5 |
| 2014 | 112 | Div 3 Norra Norrland | Tier 5 |
| 2015 | 157 | Div 2 Norrland | Tier 4 |
| 2016 | 113 | Div 3 Norra Norrland | Tier 5 |
| 2017 | 73 | Div 3 Norra Norrland | Tier 5 |
| 2018 | 118 | Div 3 Norra Norrland | Tier 5 |
| 2019 | ? | Div 3 Norra Norrland | Tier 5 |
| 2020 | | Div 3 Norra Norrland | Tier 5 |

* Attendances are provided in the Publikliga sections of the Svenska Fotbollförbundet website.
