= Piteå IF (men) =

Swedish football club

- Full name: Piteå Idrottsförening
- Founded: 24 May 1918
- Ground: LF Arena; Piteå; Sweden
- Capacity: 6,000
- Chairman: Anders Hallberg
- Coach: Tomas Eriksson, Viktor Jonsson
- League: Ettan Norra
- 2024: Ettan Norra, 14th of 16 (relegated)
Home colours	Away colours

Piteå IF is a Swedish football club located in Piteå.

== Background ==
The club was formed 24 May 1918 but did not take up football until 1920 when they merged with their local rivaling club IFK Piteå, which then was dissolved. Piteå IF is currently playing in the third-highest Swedish division, Division 1, for men and the ladies' team are playing in the highest league, Damallsvenskan, which is their highest-ever position in the Swedish ladies' league system. The men's team's best season up until this day is their season in Sweden's second-highest division 1998. The club's men's reserve team play in the sixth highest Swedish league, Division 4.

The club has one of the largest youth academies in football in the county of Norrbotten and is one of two arranging clubs of the large international youth football cup Piteå Summer Games.

The Piteå IF FF Akademi is the official academy of Piteå IF and consists most of U19 players and younger.

The club plays their home matches at LF Arena.

== Season to season ==
Season	Level	Division	Section	Position	Movements
1993	Tier 3	Division 2	Norrland	9th	
1994	Tier 3	Division 2	Norrland	7th	
1995	Tier 3	Division 2	Norrland	8th	
1996	Tier 3	Division 2	Norrland	2nd	Promotion play-offs
1997	Tier 3	Division 2	Norrland	1st	Promoted
1998	Tier 2	Division 1	Norra	12th	Relegated
1999	Tier 3	Division 2	Norrland	4th	
2000	Tier 3	Division 2	Norrland	11th	Relegated
2001	Tier 4	Division 3	Norra Norrland	1st	Promoted
2002	Tier 3	Division 2	Norrland	7th	
2003	Tier 3	Division 2	Norrland	5th	
2004	Tier 3	Division 2	Norrland	10th	Relegation play-offs
2005	Tier 3	Division 2	Norrland	10th	
2006*	Tier 4	Division 2	Norrland	12th	Relegated
2007	Tier 5	Division 3	Norra Norrland	1st	Promoted
2008	Tier 4	Division 2	Norrland	3rd	
2009	Tier 4	Division 2	Norrland	5th	
2010	Tier 4	Division 2	Norrland	3rd	
2011	Tier 4	Division 2	Norrland	7th	
2012	Tier 4	Division 2	Norrland	9th	
2013	Tier 4	Division 2	Norrland	6th	
2014	Tier 4	Division 2	Norrland	1st	Promoted
2015	Tier 3	Division 1	Norra	9th	
2016	Tier 3	Division 1	Norra	13th	Relegated
2017	Tier 4	Division 2	Norrland	4th	
2018	Tier 4	Division 2	Norrland	6th	
2019	Tier 4	Division 2	Norrland	5th	
2020	Tier 4	Division 2	Norrland	1st	Promoted
2021	Tier 3	Division 1	Norra	8th	
2022	Tier 3	Division 1	Norra	11th	
2023	Tier 3	Division 1	Norra	7th	
2024	Tier 3	Division 1	Norra	14th	Relegated

* League restructuring in 2006 resulted in a new division being created at tier 3 and subsequent divisions dropping a level.

== Attendances ==
In recent seasons Piteå IF have had the following average attendances:

Season	Average attendance	Division/section	Level
2005	382	Div 2 Norrland	Tier 3
2006	245	Div 2 Norrland	Tier 4
2007	279	Div 3 Norra Norrland	Tier 5
2008	296	Div 2 Norrland	Tier 4
2009	512	Div 2 Norrland	Tier 4
2010	505	Div 2 Norrland	Tier 4
2011	301	Div 2 Norrland	Tier 4

* Attendances are provided in the Publikliga sections of the Svenska Fotbollförbundet website.

== Current squad ==
As of 20 September 2026

Note: Flags indicate national team as defined under FIFA eligibility rules; some limited exceptions apply. Players may hold more than one non-FIFA nationality.

No.	Pos.	Nation	Player
1	GK	SWE	Tomas Adell
2	DF	SWE	Henrik Millbert
3	DF	SWE	Joshua Mambu (on loan from GIF Sundsvall)
4	DF	NED	Ties Oostra
5	DF	SWE	Bekir Kavur
6	DF	SWE	Siavash Jamehdar
7	MF	SWE	Augustin Muyenga
8	MF	SWE	Charlie Berglund
10	FW	SWE	Fredrik Johansson
11	FW	SWE	José Segura Bonilla
12	FW	UGA	Carl Mujaguzi
14	FW	SWE	Jonathan Lundbäck
16	MF	IRL	Billy Brooks

No.	Pos.	Nation	Player
18	FW	SWE	Daniel Joseph John Mot
19	DF	SWE	Isac Wikström
20	MF	SWE	Alex Lindgren
21	DF	SWE	Hugo Bergström
23	FW	SWE	Linus Lindgren
24	DF	SWE	Adam Ingemarson
25	FW	BOE	Quincy Hoeve
26	FW	BOE	Gio-Renys Felicia
28	FW	RSA	Liam Jordan
29	FW	SWE	Hannes Näslund
31	GK	SWE	Filip Eriksson
99	GK	SWE	Mustapha Manneh
-	FW	SWE	Marcus Fahlgren Hällström
