= Österåker United FK =

Swedish football club

- Full name: Österåker United Fotbollsklubb
- Nickname: "United"
- Founded: 2023
- Ground: Österåkers Friidrottsarena, Åkersberga
- Capacity: 600
- Chairman: Anders Hammarbäck
- Head coach: Mauricio Rojas
- Coach: Philippe Lindström
- League: Division 2 Norra Svealand
- 2024: Division 2 Norra Svealand, 10th of 14
Home colours	Away colours

Österåker United FK is a Swedish football club located in Åkersberga.

== Background ==
Österåker United FK (as of 2026) currently plays in Division 3 Norra Svealand which is the fourth tier of Swedish football. They play their home matches at Österåkers Friidrotssarena in Åkersberga.

The original club (IFK Österåker FK) was founded after two local clubs (Runö IF and Åkersberga IF) merged in 1928. But in 2022, in anticipation of the 2023 season, the club merged and rebranded together with another local team, Åkersberga BK (founded in 1973). IFK Österåker FK was renamed Österåker United FK while Åkersberga BK was renamed Österåker United BK and became a "B-team".

The club is affiliated with Stockholms Fotbollförbund.

== Season to season ==
Season	Level	Division	Section	Position	Movements
2001	Tier 5	Division 4	Stockholm Norra	5th	
2002	Tier 5	Division 4	Stockholm Norra	4th	
2003	Tier 5	Division 4	Stockholm Norra	1st	Promoted
2004	Tier 4	Division 3	Norra Svealand	7th	
2005	Tier 4	Division 3	Norra Svealand	3rd	
2006*	Tier 4	Division 2	Norra Svealand	11th	Relegated
2007	Tier 5	Division 3	Norra Svealand	10th	Relegated
2008	Tier 6	Division 4	Stockholm Norra	2nd	
2009	Tier 6	Division 4	Stockholm Norra	6th	
2010	Tier 6	Division 4	Stockholm Norra	4th	
2011	Tier 6	Division 4	Stockholm Norra	1st	Promoted
2011	Tier 6	Division 4	Stockholm Norra	1st	Promoted
2012	Tier 5	Division 3	Norra Svealand	4th	
2013	Tier 5	Division 3	Östra Svealand	7th	
2014	Tier 5	Division 3	Östra Svealand	9th	
2015	Tier 5	Division 3	Östra Svealand	11th	Relegated
2016	Tier 6	Division 4	Stockholm Norra	1st	Promoted
2017	Tier 5	Division 3	Östra Svealand	11th	Relegated
2018	Tier 6	Division 4	Stockholm Norra	1st	Promoted
2019	Tier 5	Division 3	Norra Svealand	2nd	Promoted
2020	Tier 4	Division 2	Norra Svealand	10th	
2021	Tier 4	Division 2	Norra Svealand	5th	
2022	Tier 4	Division 2	Norra Svealand	2nd	
2023	Tier 4	Division 2	Norra Svealand	8th	

* League restructuring in 2006 resulted in a new division being created at Tier 3 and subsequent divisions dropping a level.
