= Ytterhogdals IK =

Swedish football club

- Full name: Ytterhogdals Idrottsklubb
- Founded: 1921; 105 years ago
- Ground: Svedjevallen, Ytterhogdal
- Chairman: Leif Nilsson
- Head coach: Riccardo Spoto
- League: Division 2 Norra Svealand
- 2020: Division 2 Norra Svealand, 5th
- Website: https://www.svenskalag.se/Yik
Home colours	Away colours

Ytterhogdals IK is a Swedish football club located in Ytterhogdal. They currently compete in Division 2 Norra Svealand, the fourth tier of Swedish football.

== Background ==
Ytterhogdals IK currently plays in Division 2 Norra Svealand which is the fourth tier of Swedish football. They play their home matches at the Svedjevallen in Ytterhogdal.

The club is affiliated to Jämtland-Härjedalens Fotbollförbund.

In October 2017, former Garforth Town boss Adrian Costello was appointed as manager of the club before the 2018 season start.

== Coaching staff ==
As of April 2021

Position	Name
Team First Squad Manager	Antonino Aspa
Team First Squad Assistant Manager	Dory Yates
Goalkeeper coach	Magnus Johansson
Physio	Abdulrahim Said
Kit man	Robin Edenström
Chief scout	Duncan Mckie

== Season to season ==
Season	Level	Division	Section	Position	Movements
1995	Tier 5	Division 4	Jämtland/Härjedalen	9th	
1996	Tier 5	Division 4	Jämtland/Härjedalen	9th	
1997	Tier 5	Division 4	Jämtland/Härjedalen	1st	Promoted
1998	Tier 4	Division 3	Södra Norrland	3rd	
1999	Tier 4	Division 3	Södra Norrland	10th	Relegated
2000	Tier 5	Division 4	Jämtland/Härjedalen	1st	Promoted
2001	Tier 4	Division 3	Mellersta Norrland	7th	
2002	Tier 4	Division 3	Södra Norrland	4th	
2003	Tier 4	Division 3	Södra Norrland	7th	
2004	Tier 4	Division 3	Södra Norrland	9th	Relegation Playoffs – Relegated
2005	Tier 6	Division 5	Jämtland/Härjedalen	2nd	Promoted
2006*	Tier 6	Division 4	Jämtland/Härjedalen	4th	
2007	Tier 6	Division 4	Jämtland/Härjedalen	2nd	Promotion Playoffs – Promoted
2008	Tier 5	Division 3	Mellersta Norrland	3rd	
2009	Tier 5	Division 3	Södra Norrland	12th	Relegated
2010	Tier 6	Division 4	Jämtland/Härjedalen	4th	
2011	Tier 6	Division 4	Jämtland/Härjedalen	1st	Promoted
2012	Tier 5	Division 3	Södra Norrland	12th	Relegated
2013	Tier 6	Division 4	Jämtland/Härjedalen	2nd	
2014	Tier 6	Division 4	Jämtland/Härjedalen	1st	Promoted
2015	Tier 5	Division 3	Södra Norrland	4th	
2016	Tier 5	Division 3	Södra Norrland	2nd	
2017	Tier 5	Division 3	Södra Norrland	1st	Promoted
2018	Tier 4	Division 2	Norrland	3rd	
2019	Tier 4	Division 2	Norrland	2nd	
2020	Tier 4	Division 2	Norrland	3rd	
2021	Tier 4	Division 2	Norrland	5th	
2022	Tier 4	Division 2	Norrland	10th	

* League restructuring in 2006 resulted in a new division being created at Tier 3 and subsequent divisions dropping a level.
