= Kungsängens IF =

Swedish football club

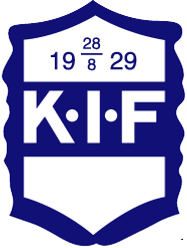
- Full name: Kungsängens Idrottsförening
- Nicknames: KIF, KIFen
- Founded: 1929
- Ground: Kungsängens IP; Kungsängen; Sweden
- Chairman: Pierre Ahlby
- Head coach: Micke Blomqvist
- League: Division 2 Norra Svealand
- 2026: Division 2 Norra Svealand, 10th
- Website: https://www.svenskalag.se/kungsangensif-fotboll-herr
| Home colours | Away colours |

Kungsängens IF is a Swedish football club located in Kungsängen in Upplands-Bro Municipality, Stockholm County.

== Background ==
Kungsängens Idrottsförening were formed on 28 August 1929.

Since their foundation Kungsängens IF has participated mainly in the middle and lower divisions of the Swedish football league system. The club currently plays in Division 2 Norra Svealand which is the fifth tier of Swedish football. They play their home matches at the Kungsängens IP in Kungsängen.

Kungsängens IF are affiliated with Stockholms Fotbollförbund.

== Recent history ==
In recent seasons Kungsängens IF have competed in the following divisions:

2011 – Division 3 Norra Svealand
2010 – Division 3 Norra Svealand
2009 – Division 4 Stockholm Norra
2008 – Division 4 Stockholm Norra
2007 – Division 5 Stockholm Norra
2006 – Division 5 Stockholm Norra

2005 – Division 5 Stockholm Norra
2004 – Division 5 Stockholm Norra
2003 – Division 6 Stockholm B
2002 – Division 5 Stockholm Norra
2001 – Division 5 Stockholm Norra
2000 – Division 4 Stockholm Norra
1999 – Division 4 Stockholm Norra

== Attendances ==
In recent seasons Kungsängens IF have had the following average attendances:

| Season | Average attendance | Division / Section | Level |
|---|---|---|---|
| 2009 | Not available | Div 4 Stockholm Norra | Tier 6 |
| 2010 | 72 | Div 3 Norra Svealand | Tier 5 |

* Attendances are provided in the Publikliga sections of the Svenska Fotbollförbundet website.
