= Division 4 (Swedish women's football) =

Women's association football league in Sweden

Division 4 (Swedish: Division 4 i fotboll för damer) is the sixth level in the league system of Swedish women's football and comprises 41 sections with 6-12 football teams in each.

== Current sections - 2019 season ==
Ångermanland

Arnäs IF 2 | Bollsta IK | Domsjö IF | Frånö SK | Husums IF | FC Härnösand | KB 65/Nätra/Sidensjö 2 | MG 83 | Modo FF | Remsle UIF 2 | Älandsbro AIK

Blekinge

Asarums FF | Kallinge SK | IFK Karlshamn | Karlskrona FK | Kristianopels GoIF | Ramdala IF | Svängsta IF | Union/ JIF/ OIF

Bohuslän/Dalsland

Dals Långeds IK | Eds FF | FC Herrsta | FC Stenungsunds IF | Frändefors IF | Gilleby-Stala Orust FC | Henåns IF | Munkedals IF | Åsebro IF/Brålanda

Dalarna

Avesta AIK | Falu BS FK A | Fors IK | Islingby IK | Korsnäs IF FK U | Malungs IF | Slätta SK | Smedjebackens FK | Säters IF FK | Vansbro AIK FK

Gestrikland

Hedesunda IF | Hofors AIF | Järbo IF | Kungsgårdens SK | Sandvikens AIK | Sandvikens IF 2 | Skutskärs IF FK | Stensätra IF | Strömsbro IF | Valbo FF | Årsunda IF | Österfärnebo IF

Göteborg A

Ahlafors IF | Askims IK | BK Häcken | Fräntorp / Qviding FIF | Göteborgs FF | Hisingsbacka FC | Kungälvs FF | Kärra KIF | Lindholmens BK | Ytterby FC | Älvängens IK

Göteborg B

Billdals BK | Floda BoIF | Hällesåkers DIF | IF Angered United | IF Väster | IK Virgo | Jitex FC | Stenkullens GoIK | Team Utbynäs DFF | Öjersjö IF

Gotland

Dalhem IF B | Dalhem IF C | Fardhem IF | IFK Visby | IFK Visby B | IK Graip | P 18 IK B | P18 IK C | Stenkyrka IF

Halland norra

IFK Fjärås 2 | Frillesås FF | Kungsbacka IF 2 | Lerkils IF | Löftadalens IF | Onsala BK | Tofta GoIF | Tölö IF 3 | Varbergs BoIS FC | Veddige BK

Halland södra

BK Astrio 2 | IF Böljan 2 | Hyltebruks IF | Kornhult/Hishult FF | Laholms FK 2 | Oskarströms IS | Snöstorp/Nyhem FF | Torup/Rydö FF | Trönninge IF | Ullareds IK

Hälsingland norra

Bergsjö IF | Bjuråkers GIF | Delsbo IF | Högs SK | IFK Gnarp | Korskrogens IK | Njutångers IF

Hälsingland södra

Edsbyns IF FF 2 | IFK Bergvik | Järvsö BK | Kilafors IF 2 | Moheds SK 2 | Trönö IK 2/NIF

Jämtland/Härjedalen

BK Björnen | Brunflo FK 2 | IFK Östersund | IFK Östersund 2 | Myssjö/Ovikens IF 2 | Ope IF 2 | Orrvikens IK

Medelpad

IFK Timrå 2 | Kovlands IF | Matfors IF | Njurunda IK | Stöde IF | Sundsvalls DFF 3 | Söråkers FF 2 | Torpshammar2/Erikslund

Norrbotten norra

Assi IF 2 | Kiruna FF | Luleå SK/ Lira BK 2 | Luleå DFC 2 | Malmbergets AIF Damer | FC Norra | Sunderby SK | Överkalix IF

Norrbotten södra

IFK Arvidsjaur | PIF/ MSSK 2 | FC Norrsken/ SSK 2 | Storfors AIK 2 | Trångfors IF 2 | Älvdalen United

Örebro

IF Eker Örebro | Frövi IK 2 | Garphyttans IF | Hallsbergs BK | HOIF | Hovsta IF | Mullhyttans IF | Nora Pershyttan BK 2 | Rynninge IK 2 | Sköllersta IF | IK Sturehov 2 | IK Sturehov 3

Östergötland östra

Eneby BK B | Krokeks IF | Kuddby IF | Lindö FF B | Lotorps IF B | Norrköping City | Smedby AIS C | Sturefors IF | Tannefors IF | Vånga IF

Östergötland västra

Borensbergs IF FK | Boxholms IF | Kisa BK B | LSW IF | Mjölby AI FF B | Mjölby Södra IF B | Rimforsa IF | BK Tinnis B | IFK Wreta Kloster | BK Zeros

Skåne nordöstra

Fjälkinge IF | IFK Knislinge | Lönsboda GoIF | Näsby IF | Näsums IF | Osby DFF | Röke IF | Stehags AIF | Sösdala IF | Önnestad BoIF

Skåne nordvästra

Billesholms IK | DFK Wormo | Eskilsminne IF | Glumslövs FF | Hittarps IK | Kullabygdens DFF | Kullavägens BK | Råå DIF | Västra Karups IF | Ängelholms FF

Skåne sydöstra

DFK Sjöbotjejerna | Hammenhögs Blå IF | Harlösa IF | Löberöds IF | Lövestads IF/Vanstad | Onslunda IF | Skillinge IF | Skurups AIF | Team Sandby IF | Tomelilla IF

Skåne sydvästra

DFK Borgeby 09 | FC Krubban | Harrie-Kävlinge FF | Hyllie IK | Klågerups GIF | Kvarnby IK | Lunds SK | TFK Nova Eslöv | Uppåkra IF | Vellinge IF

Småland nordöstra

Gullringens GoIF | Hjorted/Totebo | Hultsfreds FK/SK Lojal B | Krokstorps IF | Mönsterås GoIF | Rosenfors IK | Rödsle BK B | Tjust IF | Vimmerby IF B | Västerviks FF

Småland nordvästra

Aneby SK | Bankeryds SK | Egnahems BK B | IF Eksjö Fotboll | Habo IF B | IF Haga | Hovslätts IK B | Mariebo IK B | Norrahammars IK | Tranås FF

Småland södra

Alvesta GoIF B | Emmaboda IS B | Ingelstads IK | Konga SK | Liatorps IF | Ljungby IF B | Moheda IF | Rottne IF | Växjö FF B | Älmhults IF B

Småland sydöstra

Bodabruks GoIF | IFK Borgholm | Färjestadens GoIF | Högsrums FF | IFK Kalmar C | Madesjö IF B | Norra Tångs BK | Smedby BoIK | Team Södermöre | Vissefjärda GoIF

Småland västra

Bodafors SK | Bors SK | Forsheda IF | Gnosjö Spirit FC | Landsbro IF B | Nässjö FF | Skillingaryd IS | Smålandsstenars GoIF | Waggeryds IK | Vetlanda FF

Södermanland

DFK Värmbol 2 | Hargs BK | IK Tun 2 | IK Viljan Strängnäs | Julita/Gropptorp | New Mill Indians SK | BK Sport | Stenkvista GoIF | Team Rosa SK | Torshälla/Nyby IS

Stockholm A

Bollstanäs DFF | Essinge IK | FC Järfälla | Kallhälls FF | Reymersholms IK | Skå DFF | Sollentuna Fotboll IF | Stocksunds IF | Vasalunds DFF

Stockholm B

Boo TFF | Enskede FF | IFK Aspudden | Nackdala AIS | Norsborgs FF | Nynäshamns IF FK | Sätra SK | Södersnäckornas BK | Vendelsö IK | Ösmo GIF FK

Uppland östra

Alunda IF | BKV Norrtälje | Frösunda SK | Häverödals SK | Knivsta IK | Märsta IK | Norrskedika IF | Sunnersta AIF | Uppsala IF | Vaksala SK

Uppland västra

Bälinge IF | Enköpings IS | Enköpings SK UK | IK Fyris | Gamlis FF | Morgongåva SK | Skuttunge SK | Söderfors GoIF | Tierps DFF | Vattholma IF

Värmland

IK Arvika Fotboll | Bråtens IK | Deje IK | Gunnarskog/Bortan | IF Kil U | Mallbacken 2 | Råda IK | Torsby IF | Villastadens IF 2 | Åtorps IF

Västerbotten norra

Bureå IF | Byske IF BODÅ | Fromhedens IF | IK Klintarna | Ljusvattnets IF/IFK Bjurfors | Mjövallens BK | Myckle IK | Rönnskär Railcare IF

Västerbotten södra

FC Mary's Home | Gimonäs UIF | Hörnefors IF | Hörnsjö IF | IFK Umeå | FC Mary's Home | Röbäcks IF | Sandåkerns SK | Sörfors IF

Västerbotten västra

Betsele IF | Storumans IK | Tvärålunds IF Vindeln/Tvärålund | Vilhelmina IK | Vännäs AIK | Åsele IK

Västergötland norra

Jung/Kvänum | Kinnarp/Slutarps IF | Kinne Vedum/Källby | Norra Fågelås IF | Skara FC | Skultorps IF | Töreboda IK | Ulvåkers FC | Våmbs IF | IFK Värsås

Västergötland södra

Borås GIF | DIF Holmalund | IFK Öxnevalla | IF Olsfors | Kindaholms FF | Rävlanda AIS | Timmele GoIF | Åsunden FK | Äspereds IF

Västergötland västra

Alvhems IK | FC Gauthiod | Lidköpings DIF | Mellby IK | Rackeby IK | Råda BK | Vara SK | Wargöns IK | Vårgårda IK | Vänersborgs IF

Västmanland

Forsby FF U1 | IK Franke U1 | Gideonsberg IF U2 | Kolsva IF | Surahammars FK | Tillberga IK | Wefors FF | Västerås BK 30 U2 | Västerås IK U1
