= 2006 in Swedish football =

The 2006 season in Swedish football, starting January 2006 and ending December 2006:

== Events ==
- 18 January 2006: The Sweden national team plays a friendly in Riyadh, Saudi Arabia against the hosts, causing upset home in Sweden when it is revealed that no women are allowed at the stadium.
- 2 September 2006: The punishment for the clubs involved in the tumult at Söderstadion during the 53 minute abandoned match Hammarby IF–Djurgårdens IF played 28 September—when home fans stormed the pitch and shot fireworks from the stands—is decided by the Swedish Football Association; Hammarby IF loses the match 0–3 (the score when the match was abandoned), loses an extra three points, and are fined 200,000 SEK, Djurgårdens IF are fined 15,000 SEK.
- 5 November 2006: IF Elfsborg beat Djurgårdens IF 1–0 in the last matchday of 2006 Allsvenskan and become champions for the first time since 1961.
- 9 December 2006: The Swedish Football Association decides to increase the number of teams in Allsvenskan from 14 to 16—effective from the 2008 season—meaning that the 2007 season will see only one team being relegated from Allsvenskan while three teams will be automatically promoted from Superettan.

== Honours ==
=== Official titles ===
Title	Team	Reason
Swedish Champions 2006	IF Elfsborg	Winners of Allsvenskan
Swedish Cup Champions 2006	Helsingborgs IF	Winners of Svenska Cupen

=== Competitions ===
Level	Competition	Team
1st level	Allsvenskan 2006	IF Elfsborg
2nd level	Superettan 2006	Trelleborgs FF
3rd level	Division 1 Norra 2006	Enköpings SK
3rd level	Division 1 Södra 2006	IF Sylvia
Cup	Svenska Cupen 2006	Helsingborgs IF

== Promotions, relegations and qualifications ==
=== Promotions ===
Promoted from	Promoted to	Team	Reason
Superettan 2006	Allsvenskan 2007	Trelleborgs FF	Winners
Superettan 2006	Allsvenskan 2007	Örebro SK	2nd team
Superettan 2006	Allsvenskan 2007	IF Brommapojkarna	Winners of qualification play-off
Division 1 Norra 2006	Superettan 2007	Enköpings SK	Winners
Division 1 Norra 2006	Superettan 2007	IK Sirius	Winners of qualification play-off
Division 1 Södra 2006	Superettan 2007	IF Sylvia	Winners
Division 1 Södra 2006	Superettan 2007	Bunkeflo IF	Winners of qualification play-off
Division 2 2006	Division 1 Norra 2007	IFK Timrå	Winners of Norrland
Division 2 2006	Division 1 Norra 2007	Skiljebo SK	Winners of Norra Svealand
Division 2 2006	Division 1 Norra 2007	Gröndals IK	Winners of Östra Svealand
Division 2 2006	Division 1 Södra 2007	Skövde AIK	Winners of Mellersta Götaland
Division 2 2006	Division 1 Södra 2007	Torslanda IK	Winners of Västra Götaland
Division 2 2006	Division 1 Södra 2007	IFK Malmö	Winners of Södra Götaland

=== League transfers ===
Transferred from	Transferred to	Team	Reason
Division 1 Norra 2006	Division 1 Södra 2007	Visby IF Gute	Geographical composition

=== Relegations ===
Relegated from	Relegated to	Team	Reason
Allsvenskan 2006	Superettan 2007	BK Häcken	Losers of qualification play-off
Allsvenskan 2006	Superettan 2007	Östers IF	13th team
Allsvenskan 2006	Superettan 2007	Örgryte IS	14th team
Superettan 2006	Division 1 Norra 2007	Assyriska Föreningen	Losers of qualification play-off
Superettan 2006	Division 1 Norra 2007	FC Väsby United	Losers of qualification play-off
Superettan 2006	Division 1 Södra 2007	Qviding FIF	15th team
Superettan 2006	Division 1 Norra 2007	Umeå FC	16th team
Division 1 Norra 2006	Division 2 2007	Robertsfors IK	12th team
Division 1 Norra 2006	Division 2 2007	Anundsjö IF	13th team
Division 1 Norra 2006	Division 2 2007	Kiruna FF	14th team
Division 1 Södra 2006	Division 2 2007	Myresjö IF	12th team
Division 1 Södra 2006	Division 2 2007	IFK Hässleholm	13th team
Division 1 Södra 2006	Division 2 2007	Lindome GIF	14th team

=== International qualifications ===
Qualified for	Enters	Team	Reason
UEFA Champions League 2007–08	1st qualifying round	IF Elfsborg	Winners of Allsvenskan
UEFA Cup 2007–08	1st qualifying round	AIK	2nd team in Allsvenskan
UEFA Cup 2007–08	1st qualifying round	Helsingborgs IF	Winners of Svenska Cupen
UEFA Cup 2007–08	1st qualifying round	BK Häcken	UEFA Fair Play winners
UEFA Intertoto Cup 2007	1st round	Hammarby IF	3rd team in Allsvenskan
Royal League 2006–07	Group stage	IF Elfsborg	Winners of Allsvenskan
Royal League 2006–07	Group stage	AIK	2nd team in Allsvenskan
Royal League 2006–07	Group stage	Hammarby IF	3rd team in Allsvenskan
Royal League 2006–07	Group stage	Helsingborgs IF	4th team in Allsvenskan

== Domestic results ==
=== Allsvenskan ===
Pos	Team	Pld	W	D	L	GF	GA	GD	Pts	Qualification or relegation
1	IF Elfsborg (C)	26	13	11	2	41	19	+22	50	Qualification to Champions League first qualifying round
2	AIK	26	13	10	3	46	23	+23	49	Qualification to UEFA Cup first qualifying round
3	Hammarby IF (Note: Hammarby were docked three points for a tumult in their home game against Djurgården on August 28, 2006.)	26	13	7	6	40	31	+9	43	Qualification to Intertoto Cup first round
4	Helsingborgs IF	26	11	9	6	44	34	+10	42	Qualification to UEFA Cup first qualifying round (Note: Helsingborg qualified for the UEFA Cup as Svenska Cupen champions 2006.)
5	Kalmar FF	26	12	5	9	39	30	+9	41	
6	Djurgårdens IF	26	11	7	8	31	25	+6	40	
7	Malmö FF	26	10	8	8	43	39	+4	38	
8	IFK Göteborg	26	9	9	8	39	36	+3	36	
9	Gefle IF	26	8	7	11	28	39	−11	31	
10	GAIS	26	5	12	9	25	33	−8	27	
11	Halmstads BK	26	5	12	9	22	30	−8	27	
12	BK Häcken (R)	26	4	10	12	29	41	−12	22	Qualification to Relegation play-offs Qualification to UEFA Cup first qualifying round (Note: Sweden was among the best three associations in the UEFA Fair Play ranking and thus received an additional spot in the first qualifying round of the Europa League, Häcken received the qualifying spot for their ranking in Allsvenskans Fair Play ranking.)
13	Östers IF (R)	26	4	7	15	19	46	−27	19	Relegation to Superettan
14	Örgryte IS (R)	26	3	8	15	24	44	−20	17	Relegation to Superettan

Source: svenskfotboll.se (in Swedish)
Rules for classification: 1) points; 2) goal difference; 3) number of goals scored.
(C) Champions; (R) Relegated

=== 2006 Allsvenskan qualification play-off ===
November 9, 2006

IF Brommapojkarna	2–0	BK Häcken

Söderstadion, Stockholm
November 12, 2006

BK Häcken	1–2	IF Brommapojkarna

Rambergsvallen, Gothenburg

=== Superettan ===
Pos	Team	Pld	W	D	L	GF	GA	GD	Pts	Promotion, qualification or relegation
1	Trelleborgs FF (C, P)	30	19	9	2	48	13	+35	66	Promotion to Allsvenskan
2	Örebro SK (P)	30	17	7	6	56	28	+28	58	Promotion to Allsvenskan
3	IF Brommapojkarna (O, P)	30	18	3	9	53	43	+10	57	Qualification to Promotion playoffs
4	IFK Norrköping	30	15	9	6	55	30	+25	54	
5	Landskrona BoIS	30	15	5	10	53	39	+14	50	
6	Ljungskile SK	30	13	7	10	34	33	+1	46	
7	Mjällby AIF	30	11	10	9	51	49	+2	43	
8	GIF Sundsvall	30	11	7	12	42	33	+9	40	
9	Falkenbergs FF	30	10	10	10	43	40	+3	40	
10	Jönköpings Södra IF	30	9	10	11	37	59	−22	37	
11	Degerfors IF	30	9	8	13	39	41	−2	35	
12	Åtvidabergs FF	30	9	8	13	40	47	−7	35	
13	Assyriska FF (R)	30	9	7	14	30	40	−10	34	Qualification to Relegation playoffs
14	FC Väsby United (R)	30	8	8	14	34	47	−13	32	Qualification to Relegation playoffs
15	Qviding FIF (R)	30	4	6	20	31	63	−32	18	Relegation to Division 1
16	Umeå FC (R)	30	4	4	22	30	71	−41	16	Relegation to Division 1

Source: svenskfotboll.se (in Swedish)
Rules for classification: 1) points; 2) goal difference; 3) number of goals scored.
(C) Champions; (O) Play-off winners; (P) Promoted; (R) Relegated

=== 2006 Superettan qualification play-off ===
October 25, 2006

Bunkeflo IF	0–0	Assyriska Föreningen

Malmö IP, Malmö
October 29, 2006

Assyriska Föreningen	1–1	Bunkeflo IF

Södertälje Fotbollsarena, Södertälje

October 25, 2006

IK Sirius	1–1	FC Väsby United

Studenternas IP, Uppsala
October 28, 2006

FC Väsby United	0–1	IK Sirius

Vilundavallen, Upplands Väsby

=== 2006 Division 1 Norra ===
Pos	Team	Pld	W	D	L	GF	GA	GD	Pts	Promotion or relegation
1	Enköpings SK (C, P)	26	17	4	5	53	36	+17	55	Promotion to Superettan
2	IK Sirius (O, P)	26	17	3	6	62	24	+38	54	Qualification to Promotion playoffs
3	Västerås SK	26	14	7	5	58	26	+32	49	
4	Vasalund/Essinge IF	26	13	7	6	49	30	+19	46	
5	Visby IF Gute	26	12	7	7	53	45	+8	43	
6	Syrianska FC	26	12	6	8	41	32	+9	42	
7	Valsta Syrianska IK	26	10	8	8	39	34	+5	38	
8	Boden	26	7	12	7	35	32	+3	33	
9	BK Forward	26	8	9	9	33	35	−2	33	
10	Falu FK	26	6	9	11	31	38	−7	27	
11	Östersunds FK	26	7	6	13	39	47	−8	27	
12	Robertsfors (R)	26	5	12	9	35	50	−15	27	Relegation to Division 2
13	Anundsjö (R)	26	2	5	19	27	77	−50	11	Relegation to Division 2
14	Kiruna (R)	26	1	7	18	18	67	−49	10	Relegation to Division 2

Source: svenskfotboll.se (in Swedish)
Rules for classification: 1) points; 2) goal difference; 3) number of goals scored.
(C) Champions; (O) Play-off winners; (P) Promoted; (R) Relegated

=== 2006 Division 1 Södra ===
Pos	Team	Pld	W	D	L	GF	GA	GD	Pts	Promotion or relegation
1	IF Sylvia (C, P)	26	16	6	4	56	27	+29	54	Promotion to Superettan
2	Bunkeflo (O, P)	26	13	8	5	43	26	+17	47	Qualification to Promotion playoffs
3	Norrby IF	26	14	4	8	49	41	+8	46	
4	Västra Frölunda	26	13	6	7	41	30	+11	45	
5	Husqvarna FF	26	13	5	8	33	23	+10	44	
6	Kristianstads FF	26	9	9	8	42	37	+5	36	
7	FC Trollhättan	26	9	9	8	33	30	+3	36	
8	Ängelholms FF	26	10	6	10	38	37	+1	36	
9	Skärhamn	26	10	4	12	42	40	+2	34	
10	IFK Värnamo	26	8	6	12	34	34	0	30	
11	Carlstad United BK	26	8	5	13	28	41	−13	29	
12	Myresjö IF (R)	26	7	8	11	27	42	−15	29	Relegation to Division 2
13	IFK Hässleholm (R)	26	6	3	17	26	56	−30	21	Relegation to Division 2
14	Lindome (R)	26	5	3	18	29	57	−28	18	Relegation to Division 2

Source: svenskfotboll.se (in Swedish)
Rules for classification: 1) points; 2) goal difference; 3) number of goals scored.
(C) Champions; (O) Play-off winners; (P) Promoted; (R) Relegated

=== 2006 Svenska Cupen ===
Quarter-finals

August 3, 2006

Landskrona BoIS	2–3	Gefle IF

Landskrona IP, Landskrona

August 3, 2006

Östers IF	2–0	FC Väsby United

Värendsvallen, Växjö

August 19, 2006

Helsingborgs IF	3–3 4–4 (aet) 9–7 (apen)	IF Elfsborg

Olympia, Helsingborg

August 31, 2006

Kalmar FF	2–2 4–2 (aet)	IFK Norrköping

Fredriksskans, Kalmar

Semi-finals

October 19, 2006

Helsingborgs IF	3–0	Östers IF

Olympia, Helsingborg

October 19, 2006

Kalmar FF	1–1 1–1 (aet) 4–5 (apen)	Gefle IF

Fredriksskans, Kalmar

Final

November 11, 2005

Gefle IF	0–2	Helsingborgs IF

Råsunda, Solna
