= 2005 Division 2 (Swedish football) =

Swedish football league season

The following are the statistics of the Swedish football Division 2 for the 2005 season.

== League standings 2005 ==
=== Division 2 Norrland ===
Pos	Team	Pld	W	D	L	GF	GA	GD	Pts	Promotion or relegation
1	Umeå FC (P)	22	12	7	3	41	17	+24	43	Promotion Playoffs
2	Östersunds FK (P)	22	10	9	3	44	26	+18	39	Promotion to Division 1
3	Robertsfors (P)	22	11	6	5	42	33	+9	39	Promotion to Division 1
4	Kiruna (P)	22	9	8	5	45	28	+17	35	Promotion to Division 1
5	Anundsjö	22	10	5	7	38	27	+11	35	Promotion Playoffs
6	Sandvikens IF	22	9	7	6	42	34	+8	34	
7	IFK Luleå	22	8	8	6	33	31	+2	32	
8	Friska Viljor	22	10	1	11	43	38	+5	31	
9	IFK Timrå	22	8	6	8	49	36	+13	30	
10	Piteå IF	22	4	5	13	21	47	−26	17	
11	Gimonäs	22	4	2	16	18	59	−41	14	Relegation to Division 3
12	Hemmingsmark	22	3	4	15	26	66	−40	13	Relegation to Division 3

Rules for classification: 1) points; 2) goal difference; 3) number of goals scored.
(P) Promoted

=== Division 2 Norra Svealand ===
Pos	Team	Pld	W	D	L	GF	GA	GD	Pts	Promotion or relegation
1	Enköpings SK (P)	22	16	3	3	45	22	+23	51	Promotion Playoffs
2	IK Sirius (P)	22	14	3	5	63	24	+39	45	Promotion to Division 1
3	BK Forward (P)	22	13	6	3	42	22	+20	45	Promotion to Division 1
4	Valsta Syrianska IK (P)	22	13	5	4	45	20	+25	44	Promotion to Division 1
5	Falu BS	22	11	2	9	39	37	+2	35	Promotion Playoffs
6	Västerås IK	22	9	2	11	34	34	0	29	
7	Skiljebo SK	22	7	4	11	34	39	−5	25	
8	IK Brage	22	7	3	12	33	44	−11	24	
9	Slätta	22	6	4	12	32	50	−18	22	
10	Eskilstuna City	22	6	2	14	17	47	−30	20	
11	Örebro Ungdom	22	5	4	13	31	50	−19	19	Relegation to Division 3
12	Gamla Upsala	22	4	4	14	22	48	−26	16	Relegation to Division 3

Rules for classification: 1) points; 2) goal difference; 3) number of goals scored.
(P) Promoted

=== Division 2 Östra Svealand ===
Pos	Team	Pld	W	D	L	GF	GA	GD	Pts	Promotion or relegation
1	Syrianska FC (P)	22	12	5	5	39	21	+18	41	Promotion Playoffs
2	Vasalund/Essinge IF (P)	22	12	5	5	36	18	+18	41	Promotion to Division 1
3	IF Sylvia (P)	22	12	4	6	35	24	+11	40	Promotion to Division 1
4	Visby IF Gute (P)	22	11	7	4	36	26	+10	40	Promotion to Division 1
5	IK Sleipner	22	11	5	6	43	28	+15	38	Promotion Playoffs
6	Enskede	22	10	5	7	32	29	+3	35	
7	Nyköpings BIS	22	9	2	11	29	31	−2	29	
8	Hammarby Talang	22	8	4	10	37	42	−5	28	
9	Topkapi	22	7	4	11	27	32	−5	25	
10	Spårvägen	22	6	5	11	24	37	−13	23	
11	Bollstanäs	22	5	4	13	32	50	−18	19	Relegation to Division 3
12	IK Frej	22	2	4	16	18	50	−32	10	Relegation to Division 3

Rules for classification: 1) points; 2) goal difference; 3) number of goals scored.
(P) Promoted

=== Division 2 Mellersta Götaland ===
Pos	Team	Pld	W	D	L	GF	GA	GD	Pts	Promotion or relegation
1	Jönköpings Södra IF (P)	22	15	5	2	62	24	+38	50	Promotion Playoffs
2	Norrby IF (P)	22	10	7	5	41	31	+10	37	Promotion to Division 1
3	Lindome (P)	22	11	3	8	32	33	−1	36	Promotion to Division 1
4	Husqvarna FF (P)	22	10	4	8	50	40	+10	34	Promotion to Division 1
5	Myresjö IF	22	9	4	9	28	33	−5	31	Promotion Playoffs
6	Sandared	22	7	8	7	24	25	−1	29	
7	Kinna	22	8	5	9	25	29	−4	29	
8	Grimsås	22	8	3	11	31	28	+3	27	
9	Tenhult	22	6	9	7	31	38	−7	27	
10	Skene	22	6	6	10	29	36	−7	24	
11	Nybro IF	22	5	6	11	25	39	−14	21	Relegation to Division 3
12	Oskarshamns AIK	22	5	4	13	25	47	−22	19	Relegation to Division 3

Rules for classification: 1) points; 2) goal difference; 3) number of goals scored.
(P) Promoted

=== Division 2 Västra Götaland ===
Pos	Team	Pld	W	D	L	GF	GA	GD	Pts	Promotion or relegation
1	Qviding FIF (P)	22	17	2	3	48	17	+31	53	Promotion Playoffs
2	FC Trollhättan (P)	22	14	3	5	44	29	+15	45	Promotion to Division 1
3	Skärhamn (P)	22	12	4	6	40	30	+10	40	Promotion to Division 1
4	Carlstad United BK (P)	22	9	7	6	34	29	+5	34	Promotion to Division 1
5	Torslanda IK	22	9	6	7	38	34	+4	33	Promotion Playoffs
6	IK Oddevold	22	9	6	7	31	31	0	33	
7	IFK Ölme	22	9	4	9	42	31	+11	31	
8	IF Heimer	22	6	6	10	23	32	−9	24	
9	Gunnilse	22	6	5	11	24	31	−7	23	
10	Floda	22	6	5	11	30	39	−9	23	
11	Mellerud	22	5	6	11	25	41	−16	21	Relegation to Division 3
12	Karlslunds IF	22	1	4	17	17	52	−35	7	Relegation to Division 3

Rules for classification: 1) points; 2) goal difference; 3) number of goals scored.
(P) Promoted

=== Division 2 Södra Götaland ===
Pos	Team	Pld	W	D	L	GF	GA	GD	Pts	Promotion or relegation
1	Bunkeflo (P)	22	14	5	3	58	27	+31	47	Promotion Playoffs
2	Kristianstads FF (P)	22	13	4	5	47	28	+19	43	Promotion to Division 1
3	IFK Hässleholm (P)	22	12	7	3	39	23	+16	43	Promotion to Division 1
4	IFK Värnamo (P)	22	12	5	5	51	29	+22	41	Promotion to Division 1
5	Ängelholms FF	22	11	5	6	53	37	+16	38	Promotion Playoffs
6	Höllvikens GIF	22	8	5	9	30	28	+2	29	
7	Helsingborgs Södra BIS	22	8	4	10	34	42	−8	28	
8	Laholm	22	7	6	9	32	34	−2	27	
9	Lunds BK	22	6	5	11	26	34	−8	23	
10	IFK Malmö	22	6	3	13	26	49	−23	21	
11	Högaborg	22	5	5	12	21	34	−13	20	Relegation to Division 3
12	VMA	22	2	2	18	7	59	−52	8	Relegation to Division 3

Rules for classification: 1) points; 2) goal difference; 3) number of goals scored.
(P) Promoted
