= Njogu Demba-Nyrén =

Gambian footballer (born 1979)

Personal information
- Date of birth: 26 June 1979 (age 47)
- Place of birth: Bakau, The Gambia
- Height: 1.87 m (6 ft 2 in)
- Position: Forward

Team information
- Current team: Eskilstuna City (member of staff)

Youth career
- Slätta SK
- 1988–1999: Falu BS

Senior career*
Years	Team	Apps	(Gls)
1998–1999	Falu BS	31	(23)
2000–2001	Häcken	29	(6)
2001–2002	PAS Giannina	15	(8)
2002–2003	Aris	22	(12)
2003	Levski Sofia	10	(2)
2003–2005	Panathinaikos	9	(0)
2005	→ Kerkyra (loan)	7	(1)
2005–2007	Esbjerg fB	61	(21)
2007–2008	Brann	16	(3)
2009–2011	OB	53	(12)
2011	Notts County	12	(1)
2011–2012	Esbjerg fB	23	(2)
2013	IK Brage	10	(0)
2013	Dalkurd FF	7	(3)
2014	Falu FK	19	(7)
2015	Dalhem IF	9	(5)
2016–2018	Bullermyrens IK	45	(5)
2018	Falu BS	6	(2)
2022	Kvicksunds SK	3	(0)
Total		387	(113)

International career
2006–2011	Gambia	15	(3)

Managerial career
- 2016–2018: Bullermyrens IK (player-coach)
- 2021–: Eskilstuna City (staff member)
- * Club domestic league appearances and goals

Njogu Demba-Nyrén (born 26 June 1979) is a Gambian professional football coach and former player who is a staff member at Swedish Division 3 club Eskilstuna City. He has represented the Gambia at full international level. During his career, he has played in Sweden, Greece, Bulgaria, Denmark, Norway, and England.

== Club career ==
Demba-Nyrén arrived in Sweden as a nine-year-old and grew up playing for Falun-based clubs Slätta SK and Falu BS. He ventured into the Allsvenskan with BK Häcken in the early 2000s, spending two seasons before turning professional with Greek club PAS Giannina. His career took a significant turn when his coach moved to Aris, bringing Demba-Nyrén along, where he impressively scored 12 goals in 22 matches. Subsequent seasons were marred by injuries and a dip in form. After an unsuccessful stint in Bulgaria with Levski Sofia, he joined Greek powerhouse Panathinaikos, yet failed to make a significant impact. During his tenure at Panathinaikos, Demba-Nyrén experienced success by clinching the domestic double with the club. Additionally, he had a four-month loan spell at Kerkyra.

Demba-Nyrén was brought to Denmark by Esbjerg fB in 2005, quickly establishing himself as a standout player for the team. During his two-and-a-half seasons with Esbjerg, he scored 21 goals in 61 league appearances, earning a reputation as one of the club's finest players in its history. His impressive performance led to a transfer to Norwegian club Brann in the winter of 2007–08, for a reported fee of around DKK 9 million, with potential additional payments based on performance. He signed a four-year deal. In January 2009, he moved to OB from Brann as part of an exchange deal, with David Nielsen moving in the opposite direction. However, by February 2011, Demba-Nyrén was released from his contract with OB.

On 4 March 2011, Demba-Nyrén signed for Notts County on a contract until the end of the season. He scored his first and only goal of the 2010–11 season in a 3–1 defeat against Dagenham & Redbridge. On 16 May 2011 the club announced Demba-Nyrén would not be having his contract renewed.

In August 2013, Njogu made the decision to join Ettan club Dalkurd FF following his departure from Superettan club IK Brage.

During 2014, Njogu played for Falu FK. On 4 June 2015, he signed a trial contract with Dalhem IF, a Division 3 club based in Gotland. He showcased his talent by scoring five goals for the club in 2015, which included a memorable hat-trick on 22 August 2015, leading to a 4–2 victory against Älta IF.

== Coaching career ==
In January 2016, Demba-Nyrén embarked on his coaching career, starting with Division 4 club Bullermyrens IK in Borlänge, assuming a dual role as a player-coach for the team. He was dismissed in 2018. He then shortly returned to playing, by joining childhood club Falu BS in September 2018.

In April 2021, he joined the staff of Eskilstuna City.

== Honours ==
Panathinaikos

- Super League Greece: 2003–04
- Greek football Cup: 2003–04
