= Julia Roddar =

Swedish footballer (born 1992)

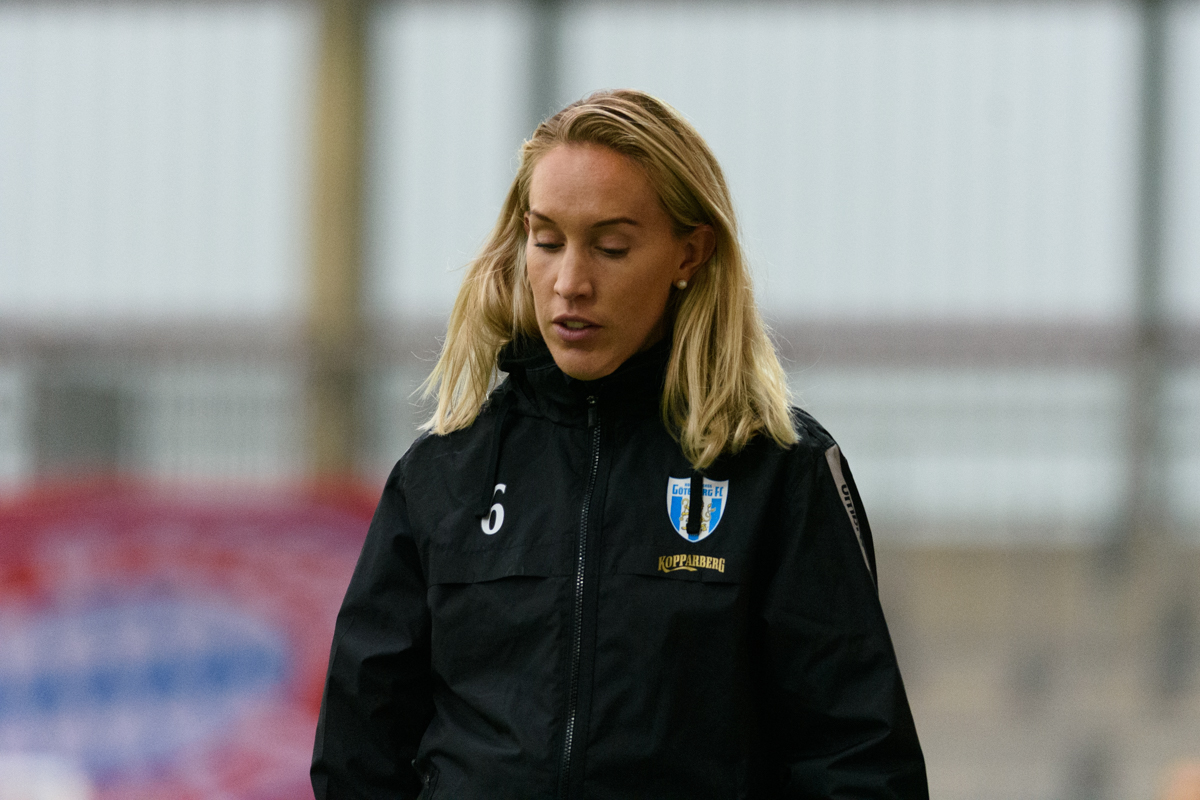
- Roddar in 2019

Personal information
- Full name: Julia Elisabeth Roddar
- Date of birth: 16 February 1992 (age 34)
- Place of birth: Falun, Sweden
- Height: 1.67 m (5 ft 6 in)
- Position: Central midfielder

Team information
- Current team: Lazio
- Number: 5

Youth career
- Slätta SK
- Falu Elit DFF
- Korsnäs IF

College career
Years	Team	Apps	(Gls)
2011	Wisconsin Badgers		
2012–2014	Florida Gulf Coast Eagles		

Senior career*
Years	Team	Apps	(Gls)
2009	Korsnäs IF	1	(1)
2010–2012	Kvarnsvedens IK	22	(2)
2013	Korsnäs IF	6	(0)
2014–2017	Kvarnsvedens IK	54	(2)
2018–2020	Göteborg FC	60	(7)
2021–2022	Washington Spirit	34	(1)
2023–2024	Hammarby IF	24	(1)
2024–2026	London City Lionesses	33	(0)
2026–	Lazio	0	(0)

International career^{‡}
2011	Sweden U19	3	(0)
2017–	Sweden	13	(0)
Medal record
Women's soccer
Representing Sweden
Olympic Games
Silver medal – second place	2020 Tokyo	Team
FIFA Women's World Cup
Bronze medal – third place	2019 France	Team
- * Club domestic league appearances and goals as of 29 June 2026 ‡ National team caps and goals as of 23 April 2025

Julia Elisabeth Roddar (Swedish: [ˈjʉːlɪa ɛlɪsaˈbeːt ˈrɔdːar]; born 16 February 1992) is a Swedish professional footballer who plays as a central midfielder for Lazio. She has won 13 caps for the Sweden national team, being part of the squad in the 2019 FIFA Women's World Cup and the 2020 Summer Olympics.

== Playing career ==
=== Early career and studies abroad ===
Roddar was born in Falun, Sweden, and started to play youth football with local club Slätta SK. She later represented Falu Elit DFF and Korsnäs IF at youth level.

In 2009, she moved to the United States to attend Shattuck St. Marys high school. In 2011, Roddar started her college career with Wisconsin Badgers, before moving to the Florida Gulf Coast Eagles a year later, graduating in 2014. When visiting Sweden between 2010 and 2012, she mostly played football with Kvarnsvedens IF in the second tier Elitettan, as well as with her former club Korsnäs IF in the third tier Division 1 in 2013.

Returning to Sweden, she won promotion with Kvarnsveden by claiming the Elitettan title in 2015. In 2016, aged 24, Roddar made her debut in Damallsvenskan, making 22 appearances throughout the season, helping her side finish 9th in the table. In 2017, she scored twice in 19 appearances, but was unable to save her side from relegation.

=== Göteborg FC ===
On 13 November 2017, Roddar joined Göteborg FC in Damallsvenskan, effective in January 2018. She helped her side finish 2nd in the Damallsvenskan table in her debut season, making 22 appearances.

In 2019, Roddar made 19 league appearances, scoring three goals, as Göteborg finished 2nd in Damallsvenskan for a second consecutive season. On 1 May 2019, Göteborg won the 2018–19 Svenska Cupen. Roddar appeared in the final, that ended in a 2–1 win at home against Kristianstads DFF. In the 2019–20 UEFA Women's Champions League, the side was knocked out in the round of 32 on away goals (2–2 on aggregate) to Bayern Munich, with Roddar playing the first leg. On 27 September 2019, Roddar signed a new two-year contract with the club.

In 2020, Göteborg won their first ever Damallsvenskan title, with Roddar scoring three goals in 21 appearances. In the 2020–21 UEFA Women's Champions League, Roddar played in both legs as Göteborg lost in the round of 32 to Manchester City by 1–5 on aggregate.

=== Washington Spirit ===
On 26 January 2021, Roddar signed a two-year contract with the Washington Spirit in the NWSL. In her debut season, the club won the NWSL Championship for the first time in its history, with Roddar making 17 appearances.

In 2022, Roddar made 17 appearances, but Washington Spirit only finished 11th in the regular season table. She was offered a new contract by Washington Spirit at the end of the year, but decided to turn it down.

=== Hammarby IF ===
On 2 December 2022, Roddar signed a three-year contract with Hammarby IF in Damallsvenskan, effective in January 2023. On 6 June 2023, Hammarby won the 2022–23 Svenska Cupen. Roddar appeared in the final, that ended in a 3–0 win at home against BK Häcken. The club also won the 2023 Damallsvenskan, claiming its second Swedish championship after 38 years, with Roddar making 24 league appearances. At the end of the season, she was nominated for the prize of Damallsvenskan Midfielder of the Year, that eventually was awarded to Yuka Momiki from Linköping FC.

=== London City Lionesses ===
On 4 August 2024, Roddar signed a two-year contract with the London City Lionesses in the Women's Championship.

=== Lazio ===
On 18 July 2026, Roddar was announced at Lazio.

== Honours ==
=== Club ===
Göteborg FC

- Svenska Cupen: 2018–19
- Damallsvenskan: 2020

Hammarby IF

- Svenska Cupen: 2022–23
- Damallsvenskan: 2023

Kvarnsvedens IF

- Elitettan: 2015

Washington Spirit

- NWSL Championship: 2021

=== International ===
Sweden

- Summer Olympic Games silver medal: 2020
- FIFA Women's World Cup third place: 2019
