= 2006 Division 1 (Swedish football) =

Division 1
- Season: 2006
- Champions: Enköpings SK (north); IF Sylvia (south)
- Promoted: Enköpings SK; IK Sirius; IF Sylvia; Bunkeflo IF
- Relegated: Robertsfors IK; Anundsjö IF; Kiruna FF; Myresjö IF; IFK Hässleholm; Lindome GIF

The 2006 Division 1 was contested by 28 teams divided into two groups geographically. Enköpings SK and IF Sylvia won their respective groups and were promoted to Superettan, along with second place-teams IK Sirius and Bunkeflo IF who each one their respective promotion playoffs against teams from Superettan.

== League tables ==
=== North ===
Pos	Team	Pld	W	D	L	GF	GA	GD	Pts	Promotion or relegation
1	Enköpings SK (C, P)	26	17	4	5	53	36	+17	55	Promotion to Superettan
2	IK Sirius (O, P)	26	17	3	6	62	24	+38	54	Qualification to Promotion playoffs
3	Västerås SK	26	14	7	5	58	26	+32	49	
4	Vasalund/Essinge IF	26	13	7	6	49	30	+19	46	
5	Visby IF Gute	26	12	7	7	53	45	+8	43	
6	Syrianska FC	26	12	6	8	41	32	+9	42	
7	Valsta Syrianska IK	26	10	8	8	39	34	+5	38	
8	Boden	26	7	12	7	35	32	+3	33	
9	BK Forward	26	8	9	9	33	35	−2	33	
10	Falu FK	26	6	9	11	31	38	−7	27	
11	Östersunds FK	26	7	6	13	39	47	−8	27	
12	Robertsfors (R)	26	5	12	9	35	50	−15	27	Relegation to Division 2
13	Anundsjö (R)	26	2	5	19	27	77	−50	11	Relegation to Division 2
14	Kiruna (R)	26	1	7	18	18	67	−49	10	Relegation to Division 2

Source: svenskfotboll.se (in Swedish)
Rules for classification: 1) points; 2) goal difference; 3) number of goals scored.
(C) Champions; (O) Play-off winners; (P) Promoted; (R) Relegated

=== South ===
Pos	Team	Pld	W	D	L	GF	GA	GD	Pts	Promotion or relegation
1	IF Sylvia (C, P)	26	16	6	4	56	27	+29	54	Promotion to Superettan
2	Bunkeflo (O, P)	26	13	8	5	43	26	+17	47	Qualification to Promotion playoffs
3	Norrby IF	26	14	4	8	49	41	+8	46	
4	Västra Frölunda	26	13	6	7	41	30	+11	45	
5	Husqvarna FF	26	13	5	8	33	23	+10	44	
6	Kristianstads FF	26	9	9	8	42	37	+5	36	
7	FC Trollhättan	26	9	9	8	33	30	+3	36	
8	Ängelholms FF	26	10	6	10	38	37	+1	36	
9	Skärhamn	26	10	4	12	42	40	+2	34	
10	IFK Värnamo	26	8	6	12	34	34	0	30	
11	Carlstad United BK	26	8	5	13	28	41	−13	29	
12	Myresjö IF (R)	26	7	8	11	27	42	−15	29	Relegation to Division 2
13	IFK Hässleholm (R)	26	6	3	17	26	56	−30	21	Relegation to Division 2
14	Lindome (R)	26	5	3	18	29	57	−28	18	Relegation to Division 2

Source: svenskfotboll.se (in Swedish)
Rules for classification: 1) points; 2) goal difference; 3) number of goals scored.
(C) Champions; (O) Play-off winners; (P) Promoted; (R) Relegated

== Young Player Teams of the Year ==
At the end of each Division 1 season an all-star game is played called "Morgondagens Stjärnor" (English: "The Stars Of Tomorrow"). The two teams playing against each other consist of the best young players from each of the two leagues. However, in 2006, which was the first year of the new Division 1, the game was instead called "FramtidsFajten" (English: "The Future Fight") and the concept was slightly different compared to the following years with the biggest young talents of Division 1 playing against the biggest young talents from the 2006 Division 2 season.

Division 1 Team
Position	Player	Club
GK	(Sweden) Jesper Hagman	Lindome GIF
GK	(Kosovo) Krenar Ejupi	IFK Hässleholm
DF	(Sweden) Fredric Jonson	Vasalunds IF
DF	(Sweden) Emil Alriksson	Östersunds FK
DF	(Sweden) Joel Burström	Robertsfors IK
DF	(Sweden) Martin Maletic	IFK Värnamo
DF	(Sweden) Linus Smedjegården	IK Sirius
DF	(Sweden) Markus Gustafson	BK Forward
MF / FW	(Sweden) Temesgen Berhane	Västerås SK
MF / FW	(Sweden) Johan Bertilsson	Carlstad United BK
MF / FW	(Sweden) Alexander Faltsetas	Västra Frölunda IF
MF / FW	(Sweden) Jakob Johansson	FC Trollhättan
MF / FW	(Sweden) Jonas Lantto	Kiruna FF
MF / FW	(Sweden) Mattias Mete	Syrianska FC
MF / FW	(Sweden) Emil Salomonsson	Ängelholms FF
MF / FW	(Sweden) Maic Sema	IF Sylvia
MF / FW	(Sweden) Richard Henriksson	Bunkeflo IF
MF / FW	(Sweden) Calle Mattsson	Bodens BK
MF / FW	(Sweden) Kalle Rydhög	Kristianstads FF
Coach	(Sweden) Pascal Simpson	

Division 2 Team
Position	Player	Club
GK	(Sweden) Fredrik Enberg	Piteå IF
GK	(Sweden) Martin Sundström	Sandvikens IF
GK	(Sweden) Lennart Sandahl	IFK Sundsvall
DF	(The Gambia) Kebba Ceesay	IK Brage
DF	(Sweden) Niklas Backman	Skiljebo SK
DF	(Sweden) Philip Haglund	Gröndals IK
DF	(Sweden) Erik Moberg	Motala AIF
DF	(Sweden) Niklas Wikén	Slätta SK
DF	(Sweden) Almir Selimovic	Påarps GIF
DF	(Sweden) Fadi Malke	Hammarby TFF
DF	(Sweden) Per Andersson	Laholms FK
DF	(Sweden) Marcus Hansson	Brynäs IF
DF	(Sweden) Martin Rudolfsson	Lunds BK
DF	(Sweden) Marcus Danielsson	IFK Eskilstuna
MF / FW	(Sweden) Petter Gustafsson	Skellefteå FF
MF / FW	(Sweden) David Löfquist	Sölvesborgs GoIF
MF / FW	(Sweden) Martin Ingelsson	Malmö Anadolu
MF / FW	(Sweden) Johan Blomberg	Lunds BK
MF / FW	(Sweden) Chamon Georges	Arameiska/Syrianska
MF / FW	(Sweden) Peter Öberg	Infjärdens SK
MF / FW	(Sweden) Daniel Jovanović	IFK Malmö
MF / FW	(Sweden) Zoran Jovanović	IFK Malmö
MF / FW	(Sweden) Robin Ingvarsson	Rynninge IK
MF / FW	(Sweden) Adem Özay	Malmö Anadolu
MF / FW	(Sweden) Daniel Bäckström	Umedalens IF
MF / FW	(Sweden) Andreas Forsby	IFK Österåker
MF / FW	(Sweden) Carlos Gaete Moggia	Haningealliansens FF
MF / FW	(Sweden) Daniel Gustavsson	Kungsörs BK
Coach	(Sweden) Jesper Blomqvist	
