= Bilal Redjdal =

Professional football player

Personal information
- Full name: Bilal Redjdal
- Date of birth: 3 December 2002 (age 23)
- Place of birth: France
- Height: 1.80 m (5 ft 11 in)
- Position: Midfielder

Team information
- Current team: CS Fola Esch
- Number: 29

Senior career*
Years	Team	Apps	(Gls)
2022-23	FC Gute	17	(10)
2023-	CS Fola Esch	4	(0)
- * Club domestic league appearances and goals as of 1 June 2024

Bilal Redjdal (born 3 December 2002) is a French professional footballer who plays as a Midfielder for Luxembourg National Division club CS Fola Esch. Born in France and raised in England.

== Early life ==
Redjdal played grassroots football for a couple of years with Cassiobury Rangers, a club based in Watford, Hertfordshire. Afterwards, he sought to join an academy program: following trials at Chelsea, Tottenham, Watford, Barnet and Fulham. He joined the youth system of Fulham F.C and was eventually released by the club. Following his release from Fulham, he had a trial with Serie A club Genoa in September 2020, along with reported interest from Djurgårdens IF and Club Brugge, as well as French club AS Monaco. He then had a trial with Ligue 1 club Angers SCO from 29 April to 9 May 2021, with fellow French clubs Nantes and Lille also interested in signing him.

== Club career ==
On 13 February 2023, Redjdal joined Swedish club FC Gute on a one-year contract, with a club option for another season. Redjdal stated he had ambition to push onto the Allsvenskan league with a positive start to his time at the club.However upon completion of the 2023 season, Redjdal's contract would be terminated by mutual consent, ending his time with the club.

In December 2023, Redjdal joined Luxembourg National Division club Fola Esch.

== Personal life ==
Redjdal was born to an Algerian-born father and a Moroccan-born mother.
