= Götene IF =

Swedish football club

- Full name: Götene Idrottsförening
- Nickname: GIF
- Founded: 24 June 1924; 102 years ago
- Ground: Västerby IP; Götene; Sweden
- Chairman: Per-Johan Svensson
- Head coach: Patrik Andersson
Home colours	Away colours

Götene IF is a Swedish football club located in Götene, Västra Götaland County.

== Background ==
Since their foundation on 24 July 1924, Götene IF has participated mainly in the lower divisions of the Swedish football league system. Following two successive promotions in 2008 and 2009, the club played four seasons in Division 2 which is the fourth tier of Swedish football. This is also the highest level the club has reached in the Swedish league system.

== Notable players ==
Both Stefan Rodevåg and Jesper Arvidsson started their careers in Götene IF. Stefan Rodevåg went on to become the top goalscorer of the 2006 Superettan and subsequently moving on to Örebro SK for a couple of seasons in Allsvenskan. Jesper Arvidsson was at 15 years signed by IF Elfsborg and went on to have a long career in the Swedish top tiers, representing clubs such as Djurgårdens IF and IK Sirius.

Arne Selmosson represented the club from 1969 to 1971. At the time he acted both manager and player.

=== Most appearances ===
Competitive matches only

Most appearances
Nr	Player	Matches
1	Kent Claesson	341
2	Leif Lindqvist	322
3	Inge Ottosson	267
4	Lars Lindqvist	264
5	Jörgen Seth	262
6	Harald Carlson	252

=== Moast goals scored ===
Competitive matches only

Top scorers through history
Nr	Player	Goals	Matches	Average
1	Fredrik Johansson	136	216	0.63
2	Bo Östensson	126	240	0.53
3	Bertil Edvinsson	111	143	0.78
4	Bo Persson	106	202	0.52
5	Ulrik Claesson	84	226	0.37
6	Sture Östensson	62	204	0.30

== Season to season ==
Season	Level	Division	Section	Position	Movements
1993	Tier 4	Division 3	Mellersta Götaland	9th	
1994	Tier 4	Division 3	Mellersta Götaland	6th	
1995	Tier 4	Division 3	Mellersta Götaland	4th	
1996	Tier 4	Division 3	Mellersta Götaland	8th	
1997	Tier 4	Division 3	Mellersta Götaland	6th	
1998	Tier 4	Division 3	Mellersta Götaland	11th	Relegated
1999	Tier 5	Division 4	Västergötland Norra	1st	Promoted
2000	Tier 4	Division 3	Mellersta Götaland	5th	
2001	Tier 4	Division 3	Mellersta Götaland	5th	
2002	Tier 4	Division 3	Mellersta Götaland	11th	Relegated
2003	Tier 5	Division 4	Västergötland Norra	1st	Promoted
2004	Tier 4	Division 3	Nordöstra Götaland	10th	Relegated
2005	Tier 5	Division 4	Västergötland Norra	3rd	
2006*	Tier 6	Division 4	Västergötland Norra	2nd	Promotion Playoffs – Promoted
2007	Tier 5	Division 3	Mellersta Götaland	11th	Relegated
2008	Tier 6	Division 4	Västergötland Norra	1st	Promoted
2009	Tier 5	Division 3	Mellersta Götaland	1st	Promoted
2010	Tier 4	Division 2	Västra Götaland	7th	
2011	Tier 4	Division 2	Norra Götaland	8th	
2012	Tier 4	Division 2	Västra Götaland	10th	Relegation Playoffs
2013	Tier 4	Division 2	Norra Götaland	12th	Relegated
2014	Tier 5	Division 3	Mellersta Götaland	7th	
2015	Tier 5	Division 3	Mellersta Götaland	5th	
2016	Tier 5	Division 3	Mellersta Götaland	2nd	Promotion Playoffs
2017	Tier 5	Division 3	Mellersta Götaland	6th	
2017	Tier 5	Division 3	Mellersta Götaland	11th	Relegated
2019	Tier 6	Division 4	Västergötland Norra	7th	
2020	Tier 6	Division 4	Västergötland Norra	2nd	Promotion Playoffs
2021	Tier 6	Division 4	Västergötland Norra	5th	
2022	Tier 6	Division 4	Västergötland Norra	1st	Promoted
2023	Tier 5	Division 3	Nordvästra Götaland	7th	
2024	Tier 5	Division 3	Nordvästra Götaland	8th	
2025	Tier 5	Division 3	Nordvästra Götaland	10th	Relegated
2026	Tier 6	Division 4	Västergötland Östra	2nd	Promotion Playoffs

* League restructuring in 2006 resulted in a new division being created at Tier 3 and subsequent divisions dropping a level.
