= Dalarnas Fotbollförbund =

District organization of the Swedish Football Association

- Abbreviation: Dalarnas FF
- Formation: 17 April 1921
- Purpose: District Football Association
- Headquarters: Dalaidrottens Hus
- Location(s): Skyfallsvägen 1 791 77 Falun Dalarna County Sweden
- Chairman: Monika Vester
- Website: https://dalafotboll.nu/

The Dalarnas Fotbollförbund (Dalarna Football Association) is one of the 24 district organisations of the Swedish Football Association. It administers lower tier football in the historical province of Dalarna.

== Background ==
Dalarnas Fotbollförbund, commonly referred to as Dalarnas FF, was founded on 17 April 1921 and is the governing body for football in the historical province of Dalarna, which corresponds with modern day Dalarna County. The Association currently has 91 member clubs. Based in Falun, the Association's Chairman is Lars Norman.

== Affiliated Members ==
The following clubs are affiliated to the Dalarnas FF:

- AIKF i Borlänge
- Amsbergs SK
- Äppelbo AIK
- Aspeboda SK
- Avesta AIK
- Avesta DFK
- Bjursås IK
- Boda Ore SK
- Borlänge FK
- Brittsens FK
- Bullermyrens IK
- Dala-Floda IF
- Dala-Järna IK
- Djurmo Sifferbo IF
- Envikens IF
- Falu BS
- Falu FK
- Färnäs SK
- Fors IK
- Forssa BK
- Gagnefs IF
- Grycksbo IF BK
- Gustafs GoIF
- Hälsinggårdens AIK
- Horndals IF
- Hulåns IF
- Husby Allmänna IK
- Idre SK
- IF Garparna FK
- IF Noretpojkarna
- IF Nornan
- IF Tunabro
- IF Vikapojkarna
- IF Vulcanus
- IFK Grängesberg FK
- IFK Hedemora FK
- IFK Ludvika
- IFK Mora FK
- IFK Rättvik FK
- IFK Våmhus
- IK Brage
- IK Segro
- Insjöns BK
- Islingby IK
- Korsnäs IF FK
- Krylbo IF
- Kvarnsvedens IK
- Långshyttans AIK FK
- Leksands IF FK
- Ludvika FK
- Malungs IF
- Mockfjärds BK
- Näs IF
- Nås IF
- Nusnäs IF
- Nyhammars IF
- Ornäs BK
- Orsa IF FK
- Sågmyra IF
- Sälens IF
- Samuelsdals IF
- Särna SK
- Säters IF FK
- Selja-Långlets IK
- Siljansnäs IF
- Skogsbo-Avesta IF
- Slätta SK
- Smedjebackens FK
- Söderbärke GOIF
- Sollerö IF
- Stora Skedvi IK FF
- Stora Tuna IK
- Sundborns GOIF
- Sunnansjö IK
- Svärdsjö IF
- Swedish Somali FC
- Tällbergs IF
- Tofta GF
- Torsångs IF
- Ulfshyttans IF
- Vansbro AIK FK
- Venjans AIK
- Vika IF
- Vikarby IK
- Vikmanshyttans IF
- Åsens SK
- Älvdalens IF FK
- Älven Futsal Club
- Öna SK
- Östansbo IS

== League Competitions ==
Dalarnas FF run the following League Competitions:

=== Men's Football ===
Division 4 - one section
Division 5 - one sections
Division 6 - two sections
Division 7 - three sections

=== Women's Football ===
Division 3 - one section
Division 4 - two section
