= Jesper Arvidsson =

Swedish footballer

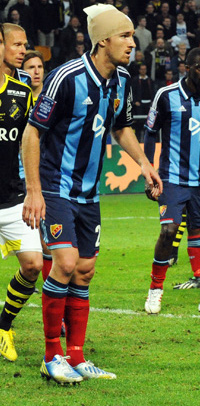

Personal information
- Full name: John Jesper Arvidsson
- Date of birth: 1 January 1985 (age 41)
- Place of birth: Götene, Sweden
- Height: 1.81 m (5 ft 11 in)
- Position: Left back

Youth career
- Götene IF
- 2000–2004: IF Elfsborg

Senior career*
Years	Team	Apps	(Gls)
2005–2011	IF Elfsborg	8	(0)
2007–2010	→ Åtvidabergs FF (loan)	110	(12)
2011–2012	Åtvidabergs FF	56	(6)
2013–2015	Djurgårdens IF	61	(5)
2016	Vålerenga	6	(0)
2016–2019	IK Sirius	58	(11)
2020–2021	IF Brommapojkarna	21	(4)

International career
2006	Sweden U21	2	(0)
- * Club domestic league appearances and goals as of 16:50, 8 August 2020 (UTC)

John Jesper Arvidsson (born 1 January 1985) is a former Swedish footballer.

== Career ==
Arvidsson started out his career at his hometown club Götene IF before he was signed by IF Elfsborg as a 15-year-old youth player in 2000. Five years later he was promoted to the first team but was unable to make a big impact. Instead he was sent out on several loan spells to second tier club Åtvidabergs FF where he became an important part of their effort to reestablish themselves in Allsvenskan. At the start of 2011 he left Elfsborg and signed a permanent contract with Åtvidaberg.

After the 2012 season Arvidsson wanted to sign with a Stockholm based club since he was living there and commuting to Åtvidaberg. He had talks with Superettan club Hammarby IF but ended up signing with Allsvenskan club Djurgården, saying that it was an easy choice for him since he wanted to remain in the top division of Swedish football.

== International career ==
Arvidsson represented the Sweden national under-21 football team twice in 2006.
