= Gotlands Fotbollförbund =

- Abbreviation: Gotlands FF
- Formation: 27 February 1921
- Purpose: District Football Association
- Location(s): Söderväg 5 a 621 58 Visby Gotland Sweden
- Chairman: Hans Rosengren
- Website: http://gotland.svenskfotboll.se/

The Gotlands Fotbollförbund (Gotland Football Association) is one of the 24 district organisations of the Swedish Football Association. It administers lower tier football on the island of Gotland.

== Background ==
Gotlands Fotbollförbund, commonly referred to as Gotlands FF, is the governing body for football in the county of Gotland. The Association was founded on 27 February 1921 and currently has 32 member clubs. Based in Visby, the Association's Chairman is Hans Rosengren.

Gotland is a member of the International Island Games Association and the Gotland football team has taken part in Football at the Island Games.

== Affiliated Members ==
The following clubs are affiliated to the Gotlands FF:

- Barlingbo IF
- Dalhem IF
- Eskelhems GoIF
- Fardhem IF
- Fårösunds GOIK
- FC Copa
- FC Gute
- Garda IK
- Gothems GoIF
- Gotlands Bro SK
- Hangvar SK
- Hemse BK
- IF Hansa-Hoburg
- IFK Visby
- IK Graip
- Kappelshamns IK
- Klintehamns IK
- Lärbro IF
- Levide IF
- När IF
- P18 DFF
- P18 IK
- Roma IF
- Rone GoIK
- Stenkyrka IF
- Vänge IK
- Väskinde AIS
- Visby AIK
- Visby AIK TFF
- VSB FF
- Wall IF
- Wisby Innerstad FK

== League Competitions ==
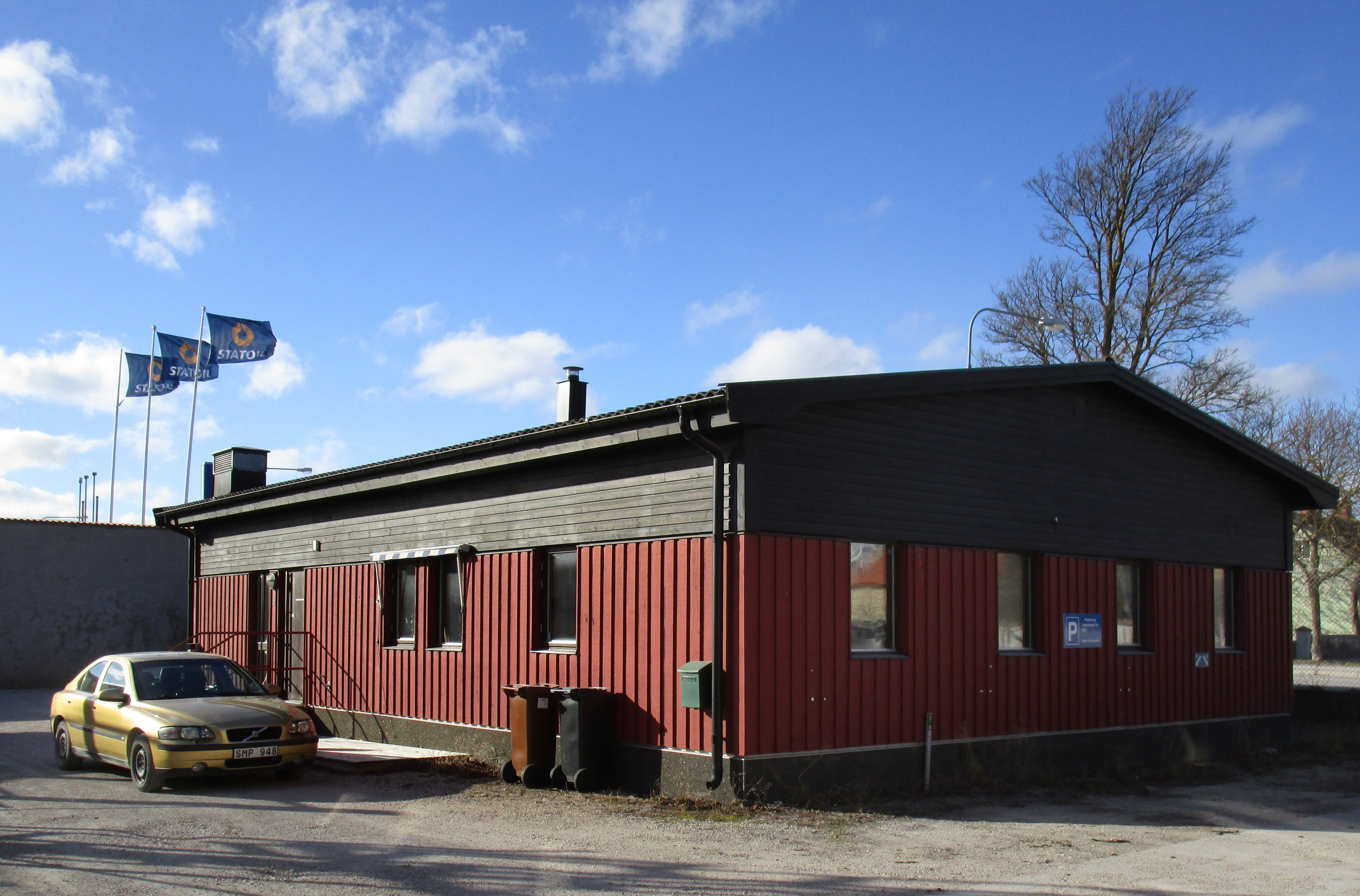
The office at Söderväg 5 A

Gotlands FF run the following League Competitions:

=== Men's Football ===
Division 4 - one section
Division 5 - one section
Division 6 - one section

=== Women's Football ===
Division 4 - one section
