= 2006 Allsvenskan =

82nd season of Allsvenskan

Allsvenskan
- Season: 2006
- Champions: IF Elfsborg
- Relegated: BK Häcken; Örgryte IS; Östers IF
- Champions League: IF Elfsborg
- UEFA Cup: AIK; Helsingborgs IF; BK Häcken
- Intertoto Cup: Hammarby IF
- Matches: 182
- Goals: 470 (2.58 per match)
- Top goalscorer: Ari da Silva Ferreira, Kalmar FF (15)
- Average attendance: 9,423

Allsvenskan 2006, part of the 2006 Swedish football season, was the 82nd Allsvenskan season played. The first match was played 1 April 2006 and the last match was played 5 November 2006. IF Elfsborg won the league ahead of runners-up AIK, while BK Häcken, Östers IF and Örgryte IS were relegated.

== Participating clubs ==
Locations of the 2006 Allsvenskan teams

Club	Last season	First season in league	First season of current spell
AIK	1st (Superettan)	1924–25	2006
Djurgårdens IF	1st	1927–28	2001
IF Elfsborg	7th	1926–27	1997
GAIS	3rd (Superettan)	1924–25	2006
Gefle IF	11th	1933–34	2005
IFK Göteborg	2nd	1924–25	1977
Halmstads BK	10th	1933–34	1993
Hammarby IF	4th	1924–25	1998
Helsingborgs IF	6th	1924–25	1993
BK Häcken	8th	1983	2005
Kalmar FF	3rd	1949–50	2004
Malmö FF	5th	1931–32	2001
Örgryte IS	9th	1924–25	1995
Östers IF	2nd (Superettan)	1968	2006

== League table ==
Pos	Team	Pld	W	D	L	GF	GA	GD	Pts	Qualification or relegation
1	IF Elfsborg (C)	26	13	11	2	41	19	+22	50	Qualification to Champions League first qualifying round
2	AIK	26	13	10	3	46	23	+23	49	Qualification to UEFA Cup first qualifying round
3	Hammarby IF (Note: Hammarby were docked three points for a tumult in their home game against Djurgården on August 28, 2006.)	26	13	7	6	40	31	+9	43	Qualification to Intertoto Cup first round
4	Helsingborgs IF	26	11	9	6	44	34	+10	42	Qualification to UEFA Cup first qualifying round (Note: Helsingborg qualified for the UEFA Cup as Svenska Cupen champions 2006.)
5	Kalmar FF	26	12	5	9	39	30	+9	41	
6	Djurgårdens IF	26	11	7	8	31	25	+6	40	
7	Malmö FF	26	10	8	8	43	39	+4	38	
8	IFK Göteborg	26	9	9	8	39	36	+3	36	
9	Gefle IF	26	8	7	11	28	39	−11	31	
10	GAIS	26	5	12	9	25	33	−8	27	
11	Halmstads BK	26	5	12	9	22	30	−8	27	
12	BK Häcken (R)	26	4	10	12	29	41	−12	22	Qualification to Relegation play-offs Qualification to UEFA Cup first qualifying round (Note: Sweden was among the best three associations in the UEFA Fair Play ranking and thus received an additional spot in the first qualifying round of the Europa League, Häcken received the qualifying spot for their ranking in Allsvenskans Fair Play ranking.)
13	Östers IF (R)	26	4	7	15	19	46	−27	19	Relegation to Superettan
14	Örgryte IS (R)	26	3	8	15	24	44	−20	17	Relegation to Superettan

Source: svenskfotboll.se (in Swedish)
Rules for classification: 1) points; 2) goal difference; 3) number of goals scored.
(C) Champions; (R) Relegated

== Results ==
Home \ Away	AIK	DIF	IFE	GAI	GIF	IFKG	HBK	HAM	HEL	BKH	KFF	MFF	ÖIS	ÖIF
AIK		3–1	2–2	2–0	2–1	4–0	3–0	0–2	2–2	1–0	1–0	3–0	2–1	5–1
Djurgårdens IF	0–1		1–1	0–2	1–0	1–0	2–1	0–0	2–1	2–1	0–1	2–3	2–2	2–0
IF Elfsborg	1–1	1–0		1–0	0–1	1–1	3–0	3–0	0–0	2–2	1–0	4–2	2–0	0–0
GAIS	0–0	1–1	0–3		1–0	1–2	1–1	2–2	0–2	2–2	2–2	0–0	2–0	1–1
Gefle IF	1–1	2–0	1–1	2–2		1–0	0–2	0–1	1–0	0–4	2–2	4–3	2–0	1–0
IFK Göteborg	1–1	3–2	1–1	0–0	3–1		0–0	1–2	2–2	3–0	0–3	1–0	2–1	0–0
Halmstads BK	2–2	0–0	0–1	0–0	3–0	1–4		0–0	1–1	2–2	0–1	2–2	1–0	1–0
Hammarby IF	2–0	0–3	1–0	5–2	1–0	3–3	0–0		4–2	3–0	1–2	2–2	0–1	2–0
Helsingborgs IF	1–1	1–1	1–1	1–0	2–0	3–2	1–1	3–1		1–3	2–1	3–1	2–1	4–0
BK Häcken	0–1	0–2	1–4	0–2	4–1	1–4	0–0	0–0	3–0		0–2	1–3	2–2	0–1
Kalmar FF	1–3	0–1	0–1	1–2	2–1	1–2	2–1	4–1	2–4	0–0		0–0	3–2	3–0
Malmö FF	3–1	0–1	1–1	2–0	2–2	2–1	1–0	1–2	3–1	1–1	2–2		4–2	2–0
Örgryte IS	0–0	1–1	0–2	1–0	1–1	3–2	1–2	1–3	1–1	1–1	1–3	1–2		0–2
Östers IF	0–4	0–3	3–4	2–2	1–2	1–1	3–1	1–2	0–3	1–1	0–1	2–1	0–0	

Source: Swedish Football Association (in Swedish)
Legend: Blue = home team win; Yellow = draw; Red = away team win.

== Relegation play-offs ==
9 November 2006
19:00

Brommapojkarna	2–0	Häcken
Bergtoft 25'; Guterstam 31'

Söderstadion, Stockholm
Attendance: 1,489
Referee: Daniel Stålhammar (Landskrona)

12 November 2006
15:00

Häcken	1–2	Brommapojkarna
Forsell 8'		Guterstam 4'; Runnemo 43'

Rambergsvallen, Gothenburg
Attendance: 2,118
Referee: Martin Ingvarsson (Hässleholm)

Brommapojkarna won 4–1 on aggregate.

== Season statistics ==
=== Top scorers ===
Rank	Player	Club	Goals
1	(Brazil) Ari da Silva Ferreira	Kalmar FF	15
2	(Brazil) Paulinho Guará	Hammarby IF	12
3	(Brazil) Wilton Figueiredo	AIK	11
3	(Rwanda) Olivier Karekezi	Helsingborgs IF	11
3	(Finland) Jonatan Johansson	Malmö FF	11
6	(England) James Keene	GAIS	10
7	(Jamaica) Luton Shelton	Helsingborgs IF	9
8	(Sweden) Markus Jonsson	AIK	8
8	(Brazil) Júnior	Malmö FF	8
8	(Sweden) Henrik Larsson	Helsingborgs IF	8
8	(Democratic Republic of the Congo) René Makondele	Gefle IF	8

=== Scoring ===
- Highest Scoring Match (7 goals) - Östers IF 3-4 IF Elfsborg, Hammarby IF 5-2 GAIS and Gefle IF 4-3 Malmö FF

=== Overall ===
- Most Wins - IF Elfsborg, AIK and Hammarby IF (13)
- Fewest Wins - Örgryte IS (3)
- Most Losses - Östers IF and Örgryte IS (15)
- Fewest Losses - IF Elfsborg (2)
- Most Goals Scored - AIK (46)
- Fewest Goals Scored - Östers IF (19)
- Most Goals Conceded - Örgryte IS (46)
- Fewest Goals Conceded - IF Elfsborg (19)

=== Home ===
- Most Wins - AIK (9)
- Fewest Wins - GAIS, BK Häcken, Östers IF and Örgryte IS (2)
- Most Losses - BK Häcken (8)
- Fewest Losses - IF Elfsborg, AIK and Helsingborgs IF (1)
- Most Goals Scored - AIK (30)
- Fewest Goals Scored - BK Häcken and Örgryte IS (12)
- Most Goals Conceded - Östers IF (25)
- Fewest Goals Conceded - IF Elfsborg (7)

=== Away ===
- Most Wins - Kalmar FF (7)
- Fewest Wins - Örgryte IS (1)
- Most Losses - Örgryte IS (9)
- Fewest Losses - IF Elfsborg (1)
- Most Goals Scored - IF Elfsborg and IFK Göteborg (22)
- Fewest Goals Scored - Östers IF (5)
- Most Goals Conceded - Malmö FF (25)
- Fewest Goals Conceded - IF Elfsborg, AIK, Kalmar FF and Djurgårdens IF (12)

=== Attendances ===
	Club	Home average	Away average	Home high
1	AIK	21,434	10,634	34,174
2	Malmö FF	13,665	9,973	23,571
3	Djurgårdens IF	13,358	11,017	31,890
4	Helsingborgs IF	12,415	9,767	17,100
5	IF Elfsborg	12,176	9,366	16,572
6	Hammarby IF	11,793	11,266	15,092
7	IFK Göteborg	10,258	11,655	20,172
8	GAIS	7,072	9,657	26,793
9	Halmstads BK	6,002	7,512	10,134
10	Östers IF	5,364	8,185	8,696
11	Kalmar FF	5,197	7,388	6,641
12	Gefle IF	5,029	7,299	7,151
13	Örgryte IS	4,995	9,813	13,221
14	BK Häcken	3,152	8,378	10,956
—	Total	9,423	—	34,174
