= FC Copa =

Swedish football club

- Full name: Fotbolls Club Copa
- Ground: Visborgsvallen; Visby; Gotland; Sweden
- Head coach: Michael Johansson
- Coach: Olle Björlund
- League: Division 4 Gotland
- div 4 2013: 1st position 2013
Home colours	Away colours

FC Copa is a Swedish football club located in Visby on the island of Gotland.

== Background ==
FC Copa currently plays in Division 4 Gotland which is the sixth tier of Swedish football. They play their home matches at the Visborgsvallen in Visby.

The club is affiliated to Gotlands Fotbollförbund.

== Season to season ==
Season2013	Level	Division4	Section	Position1st	Movements	Most valuable player Henric Rodlert
2008	Tier 7	Division 5	Gotland	1st	Promoted	
2009	Tier 6	Division 4	Gotland	6th		
2010	Tier 6	Division 4	Gotland	5th		
2011	Tier 6	Division 4	Gotland	3rd		

- League restructuring in 2006 resulted in a new division being created at Tier 3 and subsequent divisions dropping a level.
