= Stefan Rodevåg =

Swedish footballer

Personal information
- Full name: Erik Stefan Rodevåg
- Date of birth: 11 June 1980 (age 46)
- Place of birth: Götene, Sweden
- Height: 1.83 m (6 ft 0 in)
- Position: Forward

Youth career
- Götene IF

Senior career*
Years	Team	Apps	(Gls)
1996–2000	Götene IF		
2001–2002	IK Tord		
2003–2004	Kalmar FF	24	(1)
2004	→ Falkenbergs FF (loan)	5	(3)
2005–2006	Falkenbergs FF	58	(30)
2007–2008	Örebro SK	40	(6)
2009–2017	Falkenbergs FF	230	(68)
- * Club domestic league appearances and goals

Stefan Rodevåg (born 11 June 1980) is a Swedish retired footballer.

== Career ==
Rodevåg started out his career at his hometown club Götene IF, where he was moved up from the youth ranks to the first team at age sixteen. At age 21 he wanted to leave the town he had grown up in, so he trialed with GAIS and Ljungskile SK. In the end he made the move to nearby Jönköping, where he signed with third-tier club IK Tord.

In 2003, he moved up another level to second-tier Superettan when he signed with Kalmar FF. He, however, found it hard to compete for playing time with the club's Brazilian forwards and moved on loan to Falkenbergs FF in 2004, a move that was made permanent the following season.

The years that followed would prove to be the most successful in his career, and, after he became the top goalscorer of the 2006 Superettan, he got another shot at playing in the Swedish top-tier Allsvenskan, this time with Örebro SK. There he had a good first season, but injuries during his second year and a change of managers caused the club not to extend his contract. In 2009 Rodevåg returned to Falkenberg.

Rodevåg retired after the 2017 season.

== Career statistics ==
As of 11 April 2013

Club performance			League		Cup		Continental		Total	
Season	Club	League	Apps	Goals	Apps	Goals	Apps	Goals	Apps	Goals
Sweden			League		Svenska Cupen		Europe		Total	
2003	Kalmar FF	Superettan	19	1	—		—		19	1
2004	Kalmar FF	Allsvenskan	7	0	—		—		7	0
2004	Falkenbergs FF	Superettan	5	3	—		—		5	3
2005	Falkenbergs FF	Superettan	29	13	—		—		29	13
2006	Falkenbergs FF	Superettan	29	17	—		—		29	17
2007	Örebro SK	Allsvenskan	26	4	—		—		26	4
2008	Örebro SK	Allsvenskan	14	2	—		—		14	2
2009	Falkenbergs FF	Superettan	30	14	—		—		30	14
2010	Falkenbergs FF	Superettan	30	6	1	2	—		31	8
2011	Falkenbergs FF	Superettan	28	13	4	2	—		32	15
2012	Falkenbergs FF	Superettan	29	10	—		—		29	10
2013	Falkenbergs FF	Superettan	18	8	4	2	—		22	10
Career total			264	91	9	6	—		273	97
