= Visby AIK =

Swedish football club

- Full name: Visby Allmänna Idrottsklubb
- Founded: 1929
- Ground: Gutavallen (arena); Visby; Gotland; Sweden
- Chairman: Niclas Larsson
- Head coach: Roland Ahlvin
- Coach: Hnas Westberg
- League: Division 4 Gotland
Home colours	Away colours

Visby AIK is a Swedish football club located in Visby on the island of Gotland.

== Background ==
Visby AIK currently plays in Division 4 Gotland, sometimes called "Gotlandsfyran", which is the sixth tier of Swedish football. They play their home matches at the Gutavallen arena in Visby.

The club is affiliated to Gotlands Fotbollförbund. Visby AIK have competed in the Svenska Cupen on 25 occasions and have played 37 matches in the competition.

The club were close to earning promotion to the fifth tier, Division 3, and led the Gotland section for a good part of the 2011 season but fell short of the section title by a single goal despite winning their last game of the season 1–0.

== Season to season ==
Season	Level	Division	Section	Position	Movements
1999	Tier 5	Division 4	Gotland	4th	Vårserier (Spring Series)
	Tier 5	Division 4	Gotland	2nd	Höstserier (Autumn Series)
2000	Tier 5	Division 4	Gotland	4th	Vårserier (Spring Series)
	Tier 5	Division 4	Gotland	1st	Höstserier (Autumn Series)
2001	Tier 5	Division 4	Gotland	3rd	Vårserier (Spring Series)
	Tier 5	Division 4	Gotland	2nd	Slutspel A (Playoff A)
2002	Tier 5	Division 4	Gotland	1st	Promoted
2003	Tier 4	Division 3	Norra Svealand	12th	Relegated
2004	Tier 5	Division 4	Gotland	1st	Promotion Playoffs – Promoted
2005	Tier 4	Division 3	Norra Svealand	12th	Relegated
2006*	Tier 6	Division 4	Gotland	4th	
2007	Tier 6	Division 4	Gotland	3rd	
2008	Tier 6	Division 4	Gotland	8th	Relegation Playoffs
2009	Tier 6	Division 4	Gotland	4th	
2010	Tier 6	Division 4	Gotland	3rd	
2011	Tier 6	Division 4	Gotland	2nd	Missed section title by one goal
2012	Tier 6	Division 4	Gotland		

*League restructuring in 2006 resulted in a new division being created at Tier 3 and subsequent divisions dropping a level.
