= Eskelhems GoIF =

Swedish football club

- Full name: Eskelhems Gymnastik-och Idrottsförening
- Chairman: Lena Vallervind
- League: Division 4 Gotland
Home colours	Away colours

Eskelhems GoIF is a Swedish football club located in Eskelhem on the island of Gotland.

== Background ==
Eskelhems GoIF currently plays in Division 4 Gotland which is the sixth tier of Swedish football. They play their home matches at the Dalhem IP in Visby.

The club is affiliated to Gotlands Fotbollförbund. Eskelhem GoIF have competed in the Svenska Cupen on 2 occasions and have played 2 matches in the competition.

== Season to season ==
Season	Level	Division	Section	Position	Movements
2006*	Tier 7	Division 5	Gotland	6th	
2007	Tier 7	Division 5	Gotland	4th	
2008	Tier 7	Division 5	Gotland	5th	
2009	Tier 7	Division 5	Gotland	8th	
2010	Tier 7	Division 5	Gotland	2nd	Promoted
2011	Tier 6	Division 4	Gotland	7th	

* League restructuring in 2006 resulted in a new division being created at Tier 3 and subsequent divisions dropping a level.
