= Fårösunds GoIK =

Swedish football club

Fårösunds GOIK
- Full name: Fårösunds Gymnastik-och Idrottsklubb
- Ground: Fårösund IP; Fårösund; Gotland; Sweden
- League: Division 5 Gotland
Home colours	Away colours

Fårösunds GOIK is a Swedish football club located in Fårösund on the island of Gotland.

== Background ==
Fårösunds GOIK currently plays in Division 5 Gotland which is the seventh tier of Swedish football. They play their home matches at the Fårösund IP in Fårösund.

The club is affiliated with Gotlands Fotbollförbund. Fårösunds GOIK has competed in the Svenska Cupen on 19 occasions and has played 34 matches in the competition.

== Season to season ==
Season	Level	Division	Section	Position	Movements
1993	Tier 5	Division 4	Uppland/Gotland	6th	
1994	Tier 5	Division 4	Uppland/Gotland	5th	
1995	Tier 5	Division 4	Uppland/Gotland	5th	
1996	Tier 5	Division 4	Uppland/Gotland	2nd	Promotion Playoffs
1997	Tier 5	Division 4	Uppland/Gotland	2nd	Promotion Playoffs -Promoted
1998	Tier 4	Division 3	Norra Svealand	10th	Relegated
1999	Tier 5	Division 4	Gotland Vår	3rd	Vårserier (Spring Series)
	Tier 5	Division 4	Gotland Höst	1st	Höstserier (Autumn Series)
2000	Tier 5	Division 4	Gotland Vår	1st	Vårserier (Spring Series)
	Tier 5	Division 4	Uppland/Gotland Höst	4th	Höstserier (Autumn Series) – Promotion Playoffs
2001	Tier 5	Division 4	Gotland Vår	1st	Vårserier (Spring Series)
	Tier 5	Division 4	Gotland	1st	Slutspel A (Playoff A) – Promoted
2002	Tier 4	Division 3	Norra Svealand	11th	Relegated
2003	Tier 5	Division 4	Gotland	1st	Promotion Playoffs
2004	Tier 5	Division 4	Gotland	2nd	
2005	Tier 5	Division 4	Gotland	4th	
2006*	Tier 6	Division 4	Gotland	3rd	
2007	Tier 6	Division 4	Gotland	6th	
2008	Tier 6	Division 4	Gotland	2nd	
2009	Tier 6	Division 4	Gotland	3rd	
2010	Tier 6	Division 4	Gotland	5th	
2011	Tier 6	Division 4	Gotland	8th	Relegation Playoffs
2012	Tier 6	Division 4	Gotland	6th	
2013	Tier 6	Division 4	Gotland	7th	
2014	Tier 6	Division 4	Gotland	11th	

* League restructuring in 2006 resulted in a new division being created at Tier 3 and subsequent divisions dropping a level.
