= Lönsboda =

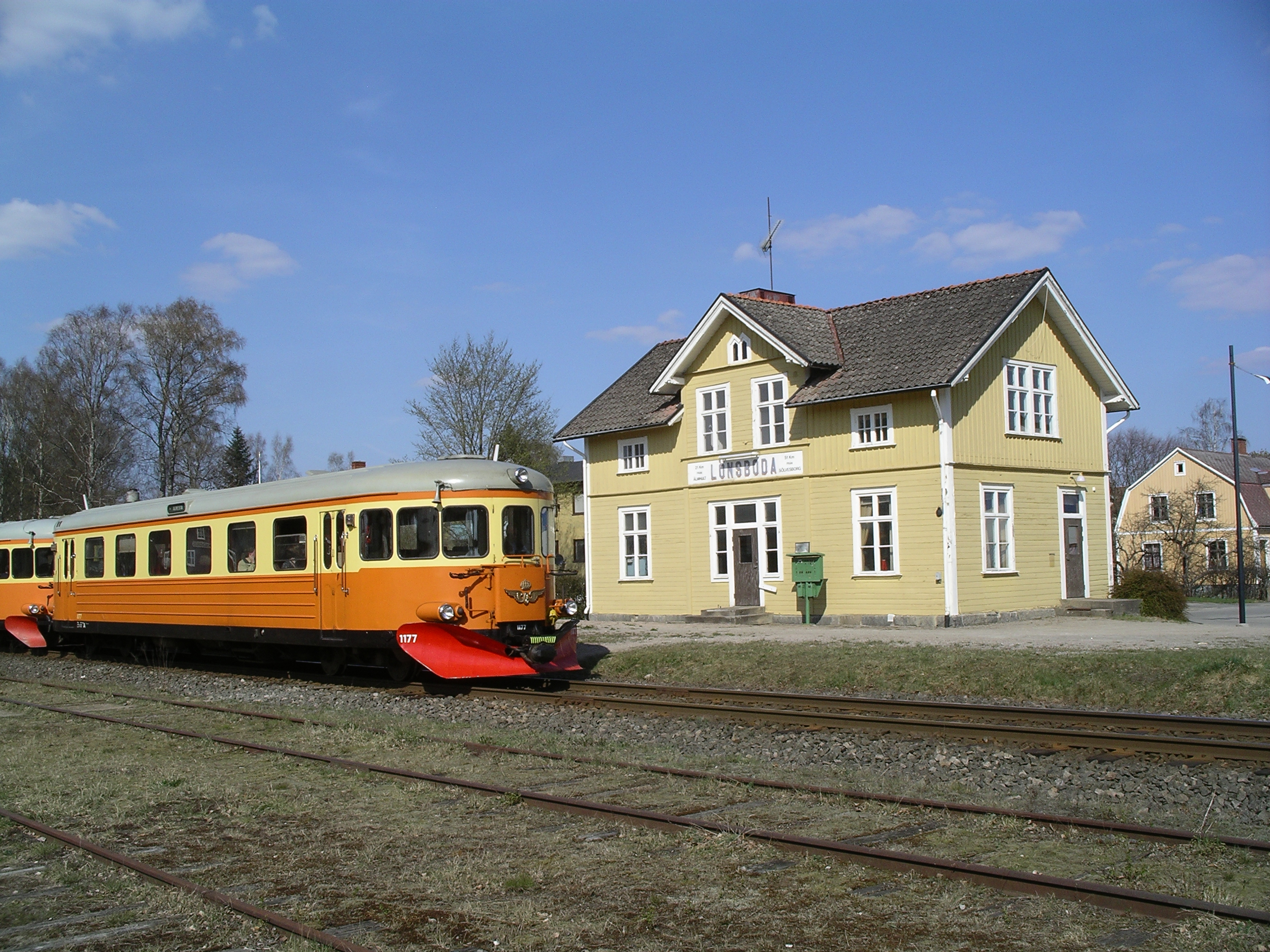
- Lönsboda railway station

- Location within Scania Location within Sweden Location within European Union
- Coordinates: 56°24′N 14°19′E
- Country: Sweden
- Province: Scania
- County: Scania County
- Municipality: Osby Municipality

Area
  - Total: 2.28 km^{2} (0.88 sq mi)

Population (31 December 2010)
  - Total: 1,903
  - Density: 834/km^{2} (2,160/sq mi)
- Time zone: UTC+1 (CET)
  - Summer (DST): UTC+2 (CEST)
- Postal codes: 280 70; 283 93

Lönsboda is the second largest locality in Osby Municipality, Scania County, Sweden with 1,903 inhabitants in 2010.

Lönsboda is situated in north-eastern Scania, about 20 km east of the municipal seat Osby and near the region border to Blekinge and Kronoberg.

The community grew up around a railway station which was opened in 1901. The town is home to sports club Lönsboda GoIF.

== United States Marine Corps War Memorial ==
Lönsboda has a connection to the United States and its military history. Sculptors obtained a block of black diabase for the pedestal of the Marine Corps War Memorial from quarries in Lönsboda.
