= Gutavallen =

Outdoor sports stadium in Visby, Sweden

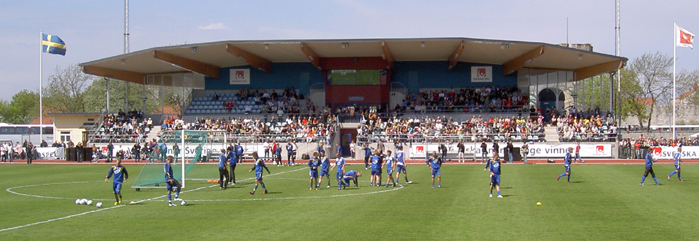
- The Sweden men's national football team's training camp for the 2006 FIFA World Cup was held at Gutavallen.
- Interactive map of Gutavallen
- Location: Visby, Sweden
- Coordinates: 57°38′7″N 18°17′51″E
- Capacity: 5,000
- Type: Sports Ground
- Surface: Grass pitch, synthetic track
- Field shape: Rectangular
- Public transit: Visby Airport

Construction
- Opened: 30 May 1927

Tenants
- FC Gute, Visby AIK

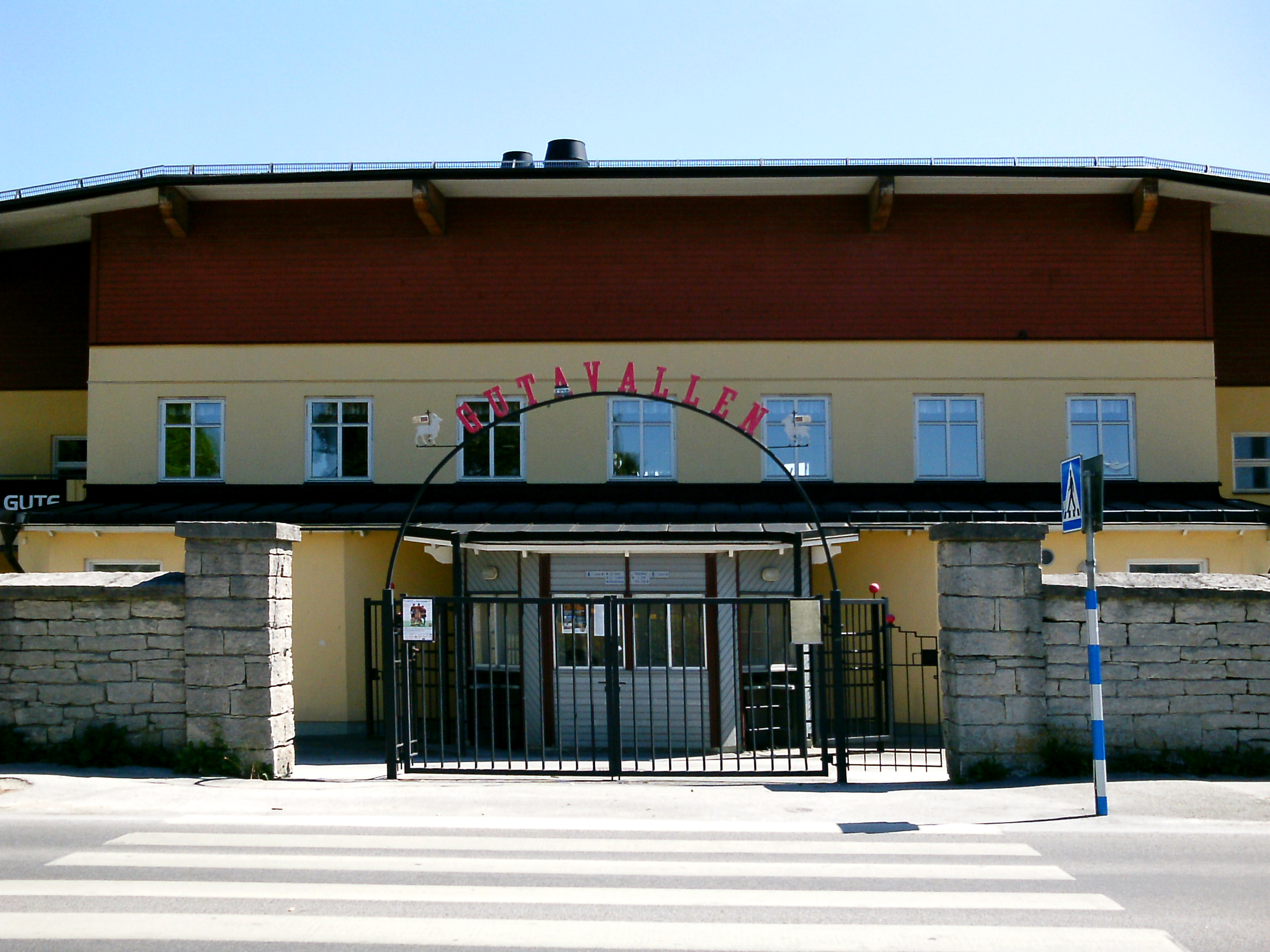
Entrance to Gutavallen

Gutavallen is an outdoor sport stadium located in Visby, Sweden. It was opened on 27 May 1927 and is used for football as well as athletics, but occasionally the arena is also used for concerts. Gutavallen is the home arena of FC Gute and Visby AIK.

The stadium has two stands—one on each long side—with the main stand seating 550 spectators. The original main stand was burned down in 1998, but was quickly rebuilt the following year. Gutavallen has a total spectator capacity of 5,000 – this is also the record which was set on 1 April 1995, when the football club then named Visby IF Gute took on the Allsvenskan team IFK Göteborg in a game at the 1994–95 Svenska Cupen which the away team Göteborg won 4–0.

At the time that Gutavallen originally was built, it did not have an all-weather running track, which was first added in 1975. Between March and August 2013, the running track was being replaced due to the track's floor having worn out.

Gutavallen has been the venue for the Sweden men's national football team's training camps a couple of times; in 2006 prior to the FIFA World Cup that year, as well as in 2012 prior to the UEFA Euro 2012 tournament. The Sweden women's national football team's training camp also took place here in August 2019, in preparation for the UEFA Women's Euro 2021 qualifying competition. It was one of the main venues for the 2017 edition of the Island Games, alongside ICA Maxi Arena.
