= Kungsgården =

- Location within Sweden Gävleborg Location within Sweden
- Coordinates: 60°36′N 16°37′E
- Country: Sweden
- Province: Gästrikland
- County: Gävleborg County
- Municipality: Sandviken Municipality

Area
  - Total: 2.16 km^{2} (0.83 sq mi)

Population (31 December 2010)
  - Total: 1,033
  - Density: 479/km^{2} (1,240/sq mi)
- Time zone: UTC+1 (CET)
  - Summer (DST): UTC+2 (CEST)

Kungsgården is a locality situated in Sandviken Municipality, Gävleborg County, Sweden with 1,033 inhabitants in 2010.

== Sports ==
The following sports clubs are located in Kungsgården:

- Kungsgårdens SK
