= 2006 Superettan =

Superettan
- Season: 2006
- Champions: Trelleborgs FF
- Promoted: Trelleborgs FF; Örebro; Brommapojkarna
- Relegated: Assyriska FF; Väsby United; Qviding; Umeå FC
- Matches played: 240

The 2006 Superettan was part of the 2006 Swedish football season, and the seventh season of Superettan, Sweden's second-tier football division in its current format. A total of 16 teams contested the league.

== Overview ==
It was contested by 16 teams, and Trelleborgs FF won the competition.

== League table ==
Pos	Team	Pld	W	D	L	GF	GA	GD	Pts	Promotion, qualification or relegation
1	Trelleborgs FF (C, P)	30	19	9	2	48	13	+35	66	Promotion to Allsvenskan
2	Örebro SK (P)	30	17	7	6	56	28	+28	58	Promotion to Allsvenskan
3	IF Brommapojkarna (O, P)	30	18	3	9	53	43	+10	57	Qualification to Promotion playoffs
4	IFK Norrköping	30	15	9	6	55	30	+25	54	
5	Landskrona BoIS	30	15	5	10	53	39	+14	50	
6	Ljungskile SK	30	13	7	10	34	33	+1	46	
7	Mjällby AIF	30	11	10	9	51	49	+2	43	
8	GIF Sundsvall	30	11	7	12	42	33	+9	40	
9	Falkenbergs FF	30	10	10	10	43	40	+3	40	
10	Jönköpings Södra IF	30	9	10	11	37	59	−22	37	
11	Degerfors IF	30	9	8	13	39	41	−2	35	
12	Åtvidabergs FF	30	9	8	13	40	47	−7	35	
13	Assyriska FF (R)	30	9	7	14	30	40	−10	34	Qualification to Relegation playoffs
14	FC Väsby United (R)	30	8	8	14	34	47	−13	32	Qualification to Relegation playoffs
15	Qviding FIF (R)	30	4	6	20	31	63	−32	18	Relegation to Division 1
16	Umeå FC (R)	30	4	4	22	30	71	−41	16	Relegation to Division 1

Source: svenskfotboll.se (in Swedish)
Rules for classification: 1) points; 2) goal difference; 3) number of goals scored.
(C) Champions; (O) Play-off winners; (P) Promoted; (R) Relegated

== Relegation play-offs ==
Team 1	Agg.	Team 2	1st leg	2nd leg
Sirius	2–1	Väsby United	1–1	1–0
Bunkeflo IF	1–1 (a)	Assyriska	0–0	1–1

Sirius and Bunkeflo promoted to Superettan

Väsby United and Assyriska relegated to Division 1

== Season statistics ==
=== Top scorers ===
Rank	Player	Club	Goals
1	(Sweden) Olof Guterstam	IF Brommapojkarna	17
1	(Sweden) Stefan Rodevåg	Falkenbergs FF	17
3	(Sweden) Patrik Elmander	Jönköpings Södra IF	16
4	(Sweden) Marcus Ekenberg	Mjällby AIF	15
5	(Sweden) Jörgen Wålemark	Ljungskile SK	13
6	(Iceland) Stefán Þórðarson	IFK Norrköping	12
6	(Ghana) Michael Mensah	Trelleborgs FF	12
8	(Sweden) Sebastian Henriksson	Örebro SK	11
9	(Sweden) Matthias Eklund	Landskrona BoIS	10
9	(Sweden) Andreas Hermansson	GIF Sundsvall	10
9	(Sweden) David Elm	Falkenbergs FF	10
9	(Brazil) Daniel Mendes	Degerfors IF	10
9	(Iceland) Garðar Gunnlaugsson	IFK Norrköping	10
9	(Sweden) Martin Smedberg	Ljungskile SK	10

=== Top goalkeepers ===
(Minimum of 10 games played)

Rank	Goalkeeper	Club	GP	GA	SV%	ShO
1	(Sweden) Fredrik Persson	Trelleborgs FF	29	13	89	17
2	(Sweden) Nicklas Svensson	Ljungskile SK	25	22	79	11
2	(Sweden) Magnus Jonsson	IFK Norrköping	27	27	79	9
2	(Sweden) Tommy Naurin	Falkenbergs FF	30	40	79	6
5	(Sweden) Peter Westman	Örebro SK	30	28	78	9
6	(Sweden) Erland Hellström	Assyriska	18	21	77	4
7	(Sweden) Kristoffer Björklund	IF Brommapojkarna	30	43	74	9
7	(Sweden) Henrik Gustavsson	Åtvidabergs FF	30	47	74	4
7	(Sweden) Fredrik Sundfors	GIF Sundsvall	28	29	74	11
7	(Sweden) Sebastian Karlsson	Degerfors IF	30	41	74	5
