= Falu BS Fotboll =

Swedish football club

Falu FK
- Full name: Falu Fotbollsklubb
- Founded: 2006
- Ground: Kopparvallen; Falun; Sweden
- Capacity: 8,000
- Chairman: Mats Andersson
- Head coach: Tomas Johansson
- Coach: Henrik Adolfsson
- League: Division 2 Norra Svealand
- 2010: Division 3 Södra Norrland, 2nd
Home colours	Away colours

Falu FK is a Swedish football club located in Falun in Dalarna County.

== Background ==
Falu FK was founded on 27 February 2006 following a joint initiative of the football sections of Falu BS, Slätta SK und Korsnäs IF FK clubs. The men's teams of the top two clubs merged in September of that year while Korsnäs IF FK retained its independence. Falu BS and Slätta SK now only operate in football youth development. The newly formed club took the place of Falu BS in the third-tier Division 1 Norra.

Since their foundation Falu FK has participated in the middle divisions of the Swedish football league system. The club currently plays in Division 2 Norra Svealand which is the fourth tier of Swedish football. They play their home matches at the Kopparvallen in Falun.

Falu FK are affiliated to Dalarnas Fotbollförbund.

== Current squad ==
Note: Flags indicate national team as defined under FIFA eligibility rules; some limited exceptions apply. Players may hold more than one non-FIFA nationality.

No.	Pos.	Nation	Player
1	GK	SWE	Mikael Wiklund
25	GK	SWE	Sander Dahlberg
2	DF	KOS	Semir Skrijelj
3	DF	SWE	Joakim Morén
5	DF	SWE	Soner Koyuncu
6	DF	SWE	Daniel Killgren
13	DF	SWE	Joseph Yakoub
21	DF	SWE	Amir Azrafshan
8	MF	SWE	Adib Azrafshan
12	MF	SWE	Rinor Shehu
15	MF	BRA	Alex Reis

No.	Pos.	Nation	Player
16	MF	SWE	Behez Ibrahim
17	MF	SWE	Joel Granberg
24	MF	SWE	Salim Soud
31	MF	SWE	William Grenholm
7	FW	TUN	Mohammed Meftah
9	FW	SWE	Carl Villwock
10	FW	KOS	Samir Skrijelj
11	FW	SWE	Mille Hamasaid
92	FW	SWE	Kalle Kayal
99	FW	GAM	Njogu Demba

=== Staff ===
- Head coach: (Sweden) Tomas Johansson
- Assistant coach: (Sweden) Peter Lundin
- Team-Manager: (Sweden) Patrik Andersson
- Fitness coach: (Sweden) Henrik Adolfsson
