= Olof Guterstam =

Swedish footballer

Personal information
- Full name: Olof Viktor Detlof Guterstam
- Date of birth: January 4, 1983 (age 43)
- Place of birth: Stockholm, Sweden
- Height: 1.88 m (6 ft 2 in)
- Position: Striker

Youth career
- Enskede IK
- Älvsjö AIK FF

Senior career*
| Years | Team | Apps | (Gls) |
| 2002–2010 | Brommapojkarna | 209 | (54) |
| 2008 | → FC Brussels (loan) | 14 | (4) |
| 2008 | → Hammarby (loan) | 16 | (2) |
| 2011 | IK Frej | 23 | (6) |
| 2012 | Älvsjö AIK FF | 19 | (17) |
| 2013–2016 | FK Gunners United | | |
| 2017– | Stureby SK | | |
| Total | | 281 | (85) |

International career
| 2007 | Sweden | 2 | (0) |
- * Club domestic league appearances and goals

Olof Viktor Detlof Guterstam (born 4 January 1983) is a Swedish former professional footballer who played as a striker. He spent most of his career at IF Brommapojkarna, but also represented FC Brussels, Hammarby IF, IK Frej, and Älvsjö AIK FF during a career that spanned between 2002 and 2012. He won two caps for the Sweden men's national football team in 2007.

== Club career ==
=== Early career ===
Guterstam arrived at Brommapojkarna in 2002, having previously played for Enskede IK and Älvsjö AIK as a midfielder and as a winger. At Brommapojkarna he was retrained to be a striker, at the initiative of the then manager of the team, Benny Persson.

=== Brommapojkarna ===
Guterstam was the joint top scorer of the 2006 Superettan season with 17 goals, alongside Falkenbergs FF's Stefan Rodevåg. He was also instrumental in taking Brommapojkarna to Allsvenskan, the highest division in Swedish football, scoring two goals in the qualifiers against BK Häcken in November 2006. He played 25 games with Brommapojkarna in Allsvenskan and scored 4 goals. Brommapojkarna finished last in Allsvenskan and the club was relegated to Superettan.

==== Loan to FC Brussels ====
Instead of following the club to Superettan, Guterstam signed a half-year loan contract with a Belgian club, FC Brussels. Guterstam scored 4 goals in 14 games for the Belgian club.

==== Loan to Hammarby IF ====
In May 2008, Guterstam returned to Brommapojkarna. Shortly after his return he signed a half-year loan contract, with an option of a permanent transfer, with Swedish club Hammarby IF. After a poor start with the club, he improved and eventually managed to score two goals. Despite his improvement, Hammarby did not choose to buy him after the contract expired.

=== Later career and retirement ===
On 25 December 2010, Guterstam left IF Brommapojkarna after 8 years at the club and signed a two-year contract with IK Frej, who had just been promoted to Division 1 Norra. He finished up his competitive footballing career by playing a season for his boyhood club Älvsjö AIK in Division 3.

In 2014, Guterstam was inducted into Brommapojkarna's Hall of Fame.

== International career ==
Guterstam was called up to the Sweden national team for the first time for their South American tour in January 2007. He made his international debut in a 2–1 loss against Ecuador. He won his second and last international cap four days later, when Sweden lost 2–0 to Venezuela.

== Personal life ==
In the beginning of his professional football career, Guterstam also attended medical school at Karolinska Institutet in order to become a physician. Following his retirement from professional football, he took up his medical studies again after a 4-year hiatus. Guterstam currently serves as a physician.

== Career statistics ==
As of 7 June 2013

=== Club ===
| Club | Club performance | | League | | Cup | | Continental | | Total | |
| Club | Season | League | Apps | Goals | Apps | Goals | Apps | Goals | Apps | Goals |
| Club | Sweden | | League | | Svenska Cupen | | Europe | | Total | |
|---|---|---|---|---|---|---|---|---|---|---|
| IF Brommapojkarna | 2002 | Superettan | 14 | 0 | | | — | | 14 | 0 |
| IF Brommapojkarna | 2003 | Superettan | 27 | 5 | | | — | | 27 | 5 |
| IF Brommapojkarna | 2004 | Superettan | 27 | 8 | | | — | | 27 | 8 |
| IF Brommapojkarna | 2005 | Superettan | 28 | 12 | | | — | | 28 | 12 |
| IF Brommapojkarna | 2006 | Superettan | 30 | 17 | | | — | | 30 | 17 |
| IF Brommapojkarna | 2007 | Allsvenskan | 25 | 4 | | | — | | 25 | 4 |
| IF Brommapojkarna | Total | | 151 | 46 | | | — | | 151 | 46 |
| FC Brussels (loan) | 2007–08 | Belgian Pro League | 14 | 4 | — | | — | | 14 | 4 |
| Hammarby IF (loan) | 2008 | Allsvenskan | 16 | 2 | | | — | | 16 | 2 |
| IF Brommapojkarna | 2009 | Allsvenskan | 30 | 5 | | | — | | 30 | 5 |
| IF Brommapojkarna | 2010 | Allsvenskan | 28 | 3 | 1 | 0 | — | | 29 | 3 |
| IF Brommapojkarna | Total | | 58 | 8 | 1 | 0 | — | | 59 | 8 |
| IK Frej | 2011 | Division 1 Norra | 23 | 6 | | | — | | 23 | 6 |
| Älvsjö AIK FF | 2012 | Division 3 Södra Svealand | 19 | 19 | | | — | | 19 | 19 |
| Career total | | | 281 | 85 | 1 | 0 | — | | 282 | 85 |

=== International ===
Appearances and goals by national team and year
| National team | Year | Apps | Goals |
|---|---|---|---|
| Sweden | 2007 | 2 | 0 |
| Total | | 2 | 0 |

== Honours ==
Individual

- Superettan top scorer: 2006 (shared with Stefan Rodevåg)
- IF Brommapojkarna Hall of Fame: 2014
