= Skogsbo-Avesta IF =

Swedish football club

- Full name: Skogsbo-Avesta Idrottsförening
- Founded: 1989
- Ground: Klockarvallen; Avesta; Sweden
- League: Division 5 Dalarna Södra
Home colours

Skogsbo-Avesta IF is a Swedish football club located in Avesta.

== Background ==
Skogsbo-Avesta IF currently plays in Division 5 Dalarna Södra which is the seventh tier of Swedish football. They play their home matches at the Klockarvallen in Avesta.

The club is affiliated to Dalarnas Fotbollförbund. Skogsbo-Avesta IF played in the 2011 Svenska Cupen but lost 0–4 at home to Sandvikens IF in the preliminary round.

== Season to season ==
Season	Level	Division	Section	Position	Movements
2006*	Tier 8	Division 6	Dalarna Södra	1st	Promoted
2007	Tier 7	Division 5	Dalarna Södra	8th	
2008	Tier 7	Division 5	Dalarna Södra	6th	
2009	Tier 7	Division 5	Dalarna Södra	9th	
2010	Tier 8	Division 6	Dalarna Södra	1st	Promoted
2011	Tier 7	Division 5	Dalarna Södra		

* League restructuring in 2006 resulted in a new division being created at Tier 3 and subsequent divisions dropping a level.
