= Fardhem IF =

Swedish football club

- Full name: Fardhem Idrottsförening
- Ground: Fardhem IP (arena); Hemse; Gotland; Sweden
- Chairman: Karl Olofsson
- League: Division 3
Home colours

Fardhem IF is a Swedish football club located in Fardhem on the island of Gotland.

== Background ==
Fardhem IF currently plays in Division 3, the fifth tier of Swedish football, after winning the 2011 Division 4 Gotland division and thus earning promotion to the fifth tier league. They play their home matches at the Fardhem IP in Hemse.

The club is affiliated to Gotlands Fotbollförbund. Fardhem/Garda IK have competed in the Svenska Cupen on 8 occasions.

== Season to season ==
Season	Level	Division	Section	Position	Movements
2006*	Tier 7	Division 5	Gotland	2nd	
2007	Tier 7	Division 5	Gotland	1st	Promoted
2008	Tier 6	Division 4	Gotland	4th	
2009	Tier 6	Division 4	Gotland	8th	
2010	Tier 6	Division 4	Gotland	1st	Promotion Playoffs
2011	Tier 6	Division 4	Gotland	1st	Promoted
2012	Tier 5	Division 3	TBD		

*League restructuring in 2006 resulted in a new division being created at Tier 3 and subsequent divisions dropping a level.
