= Kungsgårdens SK =

Swedish football club

- Full name: Kungsgårdens Sportklubb
- Ground: Sportvallen; Kungsgården; Sweden
- Chairman: Pär Törnhult
- League: Division 4 Gestrikland
Home colours	Away colours

Kungsgårdens SK is a Swedish football club located in Kungsgården.

== Background ==
Kungsgårdens SK currently plays in Division 4 Gestrikland which is the sixth tier of Swedish football. They play their home matches at the Sportvallen in Kungsgården.

The club is affiliated to Gestriklands Fotbollförbund. Kungsgårdens SK have competed in the Svenska Cupen on 2 occasions and have played 3 matches in the competition.

== Season to season ==
Season	Level	Division	Section	Position	Movements
2006*	Tier 7	Division 5	Gästrikland	6th	
2007	Tier 7	Division 5	Gästrikland	1st	Promoted
2008	Tier 6	Division 4	Gästrikland	5th	
2009	Tier 6	Division 4	Gästrikland	4th	
2010	Tier 6	Division 4	Gästrikland	8th	
2011	Tier 6	Division 4	Gästrikland	2nd	

* League restructuring in 2006 resulted in a new division being created at Tier 3 and subsequent divisions dropping a level.
