= Lönsboda GoIF =

Swedish sports club

- Full name: Lönsboda Gymnastik- och idrottsförening
- Sport: soccer
- Founded: 24 September 1930
- Based in: Lönsboda, Sweden
- Ballpark: Snapphanevallen

Lönsboda GoIF is a sports club in Lönsboda, Sweden, established on 24 September 1930 as a merger out of Lönsboda IF, Lönsboda GF, Lönsboda CK and Lönsboda Pingpongklubb. The women's soccer team played five seasons in the Swedish top division between 1978 and 1982.
