= IFK Visby =

Swedish football club

- Full name: Idrottsföreningen Kamraterna Visby
- Ground: Västerhejde IP; Visby; Gotland; Sweden
- Chairman: Lasse Orava
- League: Division 4 Gotland
Home colours

IFK Visby is a Swedish football club located in Visby on the island of Gotland.

== Background ==
IFK Visby currently plays in Division 4 Gotland which is the sixth tier of Swedish football. They play their home matches at the Västerhejde IP in Visby.

The club is affiliated to Gotlands Fotbollförbund. IFK Visby have competed in the Svenska Cupen on 2 occasions and have played 2 matches in the competition.

== Season to season ==
Season	Level	Division	Section	Position	Movements
1999	Tier 5	Division 4	Gotland	6th	Vårserier (Spring Series)
	Tier 5	Division 4	Gotland	5th	Höstserier (Autumn Series)
2000	Tier 5	Division 4	Gotland	2nd	Vårserier (Spring Series)
	Tier 5	Division 4	Uppland/Gotland Höst	10th	Höstserier (Autumn Series)
2001	Tier 5	Division 4	Gotland	4th	Vårserier (Spring Series)
	Tier 5	Division 4	Gotland	4th	Slutspel A (Playoff A)
2002	Tier 5	Division 4	Gotland	3rd	Promotion Playoffs
2003	Tier 5	Division 4	Gotland	6th	
2004	Tier 5	Division 4	Gotland	4th	
2005	Tier 5	Division 4	Gotland	1st	
2006*	Tier 5	Division 3	Östra Svealand	12th	Relegated
2007	Tier 6	Division 4	Gotland	2nd	
2008	Tier 6	Division 4	Gotland	3rd	
2009	Tier 6	Division 4	Gotland	7th	
2010	Tier 6	Division 4	Gotland	2nd	
2011	Tier 6	Division 4	Gotland	4th	

* League restructuring in 2006 resulted in a new division being created at Tier 3 and subsequent divisions dropping a level.
