= Robertsfors IK =

Swedish football club

- Full name: Robertsfors Idrottsklubb
- Nickname: RIK
- Founded: 1907; 119 years ago
- Ground: Stantorsvallen; Robertsfors; Sweden
- Capacity: 2,200
- Chairman: Eskil Holmström
- Manager: Rainer Eskelinen
- League: Division 2 Norrland
- 2012: Division 3 Norra Norrland, 2nd (promoted)
Home colours	Away colours

Robertsfors IK is a Swedish football club based in Robertsfors. The club, formed 1907, is currently playing in the fourth highest Swedish league, Division 2.

== Background ==
Robertsfors IK was formed in 1907 and bore the name Robertsfors Gymnastik och Idrottsförening for a short time. In its early history the club specialised in gymnastics, athletics and football in the summer and skiing and ski jumping in the winter. In 1925 the club obtained the lease for Stantorsvallen where they still play.

The club currently plays in Division 3 Mellersta Norrland, the fifth tier of Swedish football. In 2005 they gained promotion to Division 1 Norra but their stay at the higher level was short-lived and they were relegated back to Division 2 Norrland at the end of the 2006 season. A match many will remember from that season was when they won 7–2 against Enköpings SK FK, the league leaders. Robertsfors IK were very unfortunate to be relegated from Division 1 Norra because of inferior goal difference.

The club is affiliated to the Västerbottens Fotbollförbund.

== Season to season ==
Season	Level	Division	Section	Position	Movements
1993	Tier 5	Division 4	Västerbotten Södra	7th	
1994	Tier 5	Division 4	Västerbotten Södra	5th	
1995	Tier 5	Division 4	Västerbotten Södra	1st	Promotion Playoffs
1996	Tier 5	Division 4	Västerbotten Södra	1st	Promoted
1997	Tier 4	Division 3	Norra Norrland	4th	
1998	Tier 4	Division 3	Norra Norrland	3rd	
1999	Tier 4	Division 3	Norra Norrland	1st	Promoted
2000	Tier 3	Division 2	Norrland	10th	Relegation Playoffs
2001	Tier 3	Division 2	Norrland	3rd	
2002	Tier 3	Division 2	Norrland	5th	
2003	Tier 3	Division 2	Norrland	3rd	
2004	Tier 3	Division 2	Norrland	5th	
2005	Tier 3	Division 2	Norrland	3rd	Promoted
2006*	Tier 3	Division 1	Norra	12th	Relegated
2007	Tier 4	Division 2	Norrland	7th	
2008	Tier 4	Division 2	Norrland	5th	
2009	Tier 4	Division 2	Norrland	6th	
2010	Tier 4	Division 2	Norrland	11th	Relegated
2011	Tier 5	Division 3	Mellersta Norrland	2nd	
2012	Tier 5	Division 3	Norra Norrland	2nd	Promoted
2013	Tier 4	Division 2	Norrland		

* League restructuring in 2006 resulted in a new division being created at Tier 3 and subsequent divisions dropping a level.

== Attendances ==
In recent seasons Robertsfors IK have had the following average attendances:

Season	Average attendance	Division / Section	Level
2005	351	Div 2 Norrland	Tier 3
2006	380	Div 1 Norra	Tier 3
2007	256	Div 2 Norrland	Tier 4
2008	214	Div 2 Norrland	Tier 4
2009	215	Div 2 Norrland	Tier 4
2010	177	Div 2 Norrland	Tier 4

* Attendances are provided in the Publikliga sections of the Svenska Fotbollförbundet website.

== Staff and board members ==
- (Sweden) Hans Erik Andersson – Secretary
- (Sweden) Per-Erik Berglund – Treasurer
