= Fredrik Persson =

Swedish footballer

Personal information
- Full name: Per Johan Fredrik Fritz Persson
- Date of birth: 20 February 1983 (age 43)
- Place of birth: Sweden
- Height: 1.86 m (6 ft 1 in)
- Position: Goalkeeper

Youth career
- Staffanstorps GIF

Senior career*
Years	Team	Apps	(Gls)
2000–2017	Trelleborgs FF	220	(0)
2004	→ Malmö FF (loan)	0	(0)
2005	→ Kongsvinger IL (loan)	26	(0)
- * Club domestic league appearances and goals

Fredrik Persson (born 20 February 1983) is a Swedish former footballer who played as a goalkeeper.
