= Erland Hellström =

Swedish footballer (born 1980)

Personal information
- Date of birth: 16 December 1980 (age 45)
- Place of birth: Kaiserslautern, West Germany
- Position: Goalkeeper

Senior career*
Years	Team	Apps	(Gls)
1997–1999	Väsby IK	12	(0)
2000–2002	Hammarby IF	7	(0)
2003–2006	Assyriska	102	(0)
2007–2009	Hammarby IF	6	(0)
2009	→ Väsby United (loan)	2	(0)
Total		129	(0)

International career^{‡}
1996	Sweden U17	2	(0)
- * Club domestic league appearances and goals as of 14:40, 8 May 2016 (UTC) ‡ National team caps and goals as of 14:40, 8 May 2016 (UTC)

Erland Folke Henry Hellström (born 16 December 1980) is a Swedish former footballer who played as a goalkeeper. He played for Hammarby before leaving via a mutual consent agreement. Due to injuries he retired from the game in 2011.

== Club career ==
Hellström began his career with Väsby United, but he played just 12 times between 1997 and 1999 before departing to join Hammarby but again first-team league appearances were limited as he appeared in 7 matches. 2003 saw him move to Assyriska, a move that proved to be a success as he featured in 102 games from 2003 and 2006. In 2007, Hellström left Assyriska and rejoined Hammarby but left the latter two years later after only appearing in six matches. During his last year with Hammarby, he joined again with Väsby United on loan but made just two appearances. He officially retired in 2011.

== International career ==
Hellström represented the Sweden U17 team twice in 1996.

== Coaching career ==
Hellström became a goalkeeping coach for Frej. Since retirement, he has also been a coach at two of his former clubs, Hammarby and AFC United.

== Personal life ==
Hellström is the son of Ronnie Hellström, one of Sweden's most successful goalkeepers in history.
