= Dalhem IF =

Swedish football club

- Full name: Dalhem Idrottsförening
- Founded: 1905
- Ground: Dalhem IP; Dalhem; Sweden
- Head coach: Mikael Waktel
- Coach: Niklas Ahlström; Janne Nilsson
- League: Division 3 Norra Svealand
- 2010: Division 3 Norra Svealand, 3rd
Home colours	Away colours

Dalhem IF is a Swedish football club located in Dalhem on the island of Gotland.

== Background ==
Dalhem Idrottsförening is a sports club in Dalhem on Gotland, about 20 km (12 mi) from Visby. The club was founded on 11 March 1905 and has been engaged mainly in football, with men's football starting in 1934 and women's football in 1973.

Since football operations commenced, Dalhem IF has participated mainly in the lower divisions of the Swedish football league system. The club currently plays in Division 3 Norra Svealand which is the fifth tier of Swedish football. They play their home matches at the Dalhem IP in Dalhem.

Dalhem IF are affiliated to Gotlands Fotbollförbund. In 2011 the women's played in Division 2 Östra Svealand.

== Recent history ==
In recent seasons Dalhem IF have competed in the following divisions:

2020 – Division V, Gotland

2019 – Division VI, Gotland*

2017 – Division III, Norra Svealand

2011 – Division III, Norra Svealand
2010 – Division III, Norra Svealand
2009 – Division IV, Gotland
2008 – Division IV, Gotland
2007 – Division IV, Gotland
2006 – Division IV, Gotland
2005 – Division IV, Gotland
2004 – Division IV, Gotland
2003 – Division IV, Gotland
2002 – Division IV, Gotland
2001 – Division IV, Gotland Slutspel B
2001 – Division IV, Gotland Vår
2000 – Division IV, Gotland Höst
2000 – Division IV, Gotland Vår

*Dalhem IF had a crisis where the head coach and several players all quit, and they were unable to find replacements, forcing them to withdraw from the 2018 season. As a result, in the 2019 season, they were forced to begin at the bottom of the table in division 6.

== Attendances ==
In recent seasons Dalhem IF have had the following average attendances:

Season	Average attendance	Division / Section	Level
2008	Not available	Div 4 Gotland	Tier 6
2009	207	Div 4 Gotland	Tier 6
2010	192	Div 3 Norra Svealand	Tier 5

* Attendances are provided in the Publikliga sections of the Svenska Fotbollförbundet website.
