= FC Gute =

Swedish football club

- Full name: Football Club Gute
- Founded: 1904 as Visby IF Gute FK
- Ground: Gutavallen
- Capacity: 4,550 (550 seats)
- Coach: Christophe Lallet
- League: Division 2 Södra Svealand
- 2023: Division 2 Norra Svealand, 5th
Home colours	Away colours

FC Gute, previously named Visby IF Gute, is a Swedish football club located in Visby on the island of Gotland. They currently play in the fourth-tier league Division 2 Norra Svealand.

== Background ==
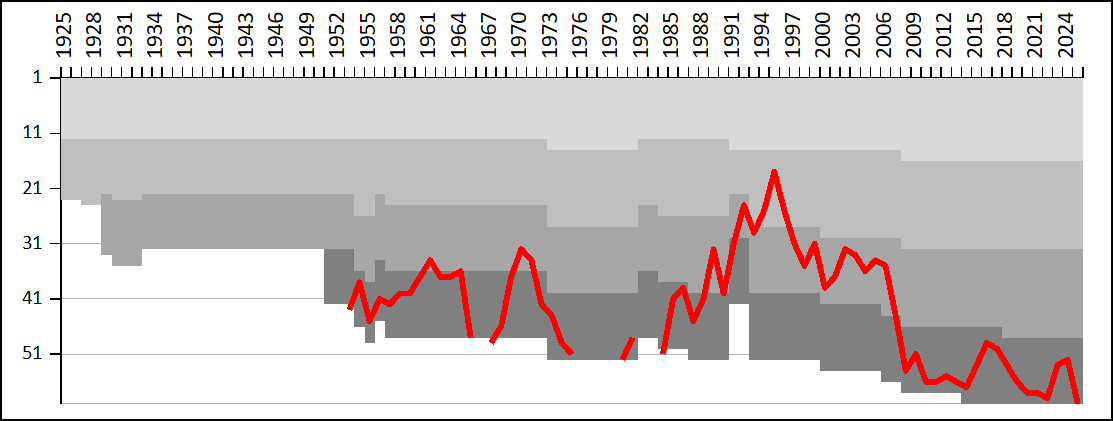
A chart showing the progress of FC Gute through the Swedish football league system. The different shades of gray represent league divisions.

The club was formed in 1904 as Visby IF Gute, and in November 2007 changed name to the present name FC Gute. The club plays in the Division 2 Norra Svealand which is the fourth tier of the Swedish football league system. They play their home matches at the Gutavallen arena in Visby, but occasionally they play at an artificial pitch in Rävhagen, Visby called "Rävhagens konstgräs" if Gutavallen is unavailable.

FC Gute are affiliated to the Gotlands Fotbollförbund.

== Season to season ==
Visby IF Gute FK played in the following divisions:

Season	Level	Division	Section	Position	Movements
1993	Tier 3	Division 2	Östra Svealand	1st	Promoted
1994	Tier 2	Division 1	Norra	11th	Relegation Playoffs
1995	Tier 2	Division 1	Norra	4th	
1996	Tier 2	Division 1	Norra	11th	Relegation Playoffs – Relegated
1997	Tier 3	Division 2	Östra Svealand	3rd	
1998	Tier 3	Division 2	Östra Svealand	7th	
1999	Tier 3	Division 2	Östra Svealand	3rd	
2000	Tier 3	Division 2	Östra Svealand	9th	
2001	Tier 3	Division 2	Östra Svealand	7th	
2002	Tier 3	Division 2	Östra Svealand	2nd	
2003	Tier 3	Division 2	Östra Svealand	3rd	
2004	Tier 3	Division 2	Östra Svealand	6th	
2005	Tier 3	Division 2	Östra Svealand	4th	Promoted
2006*	Tier 3	Division 1	Norra	5th	
2007	Tier 3	Division 1	Södra	14th	Relegated

* League restructuring in 2006 resulted in a new division being created at Tier 3 and subsequent divisions dropping a level.

FC Gute have competed in the following divisions:

Season	Level	Division	Section	Position	Movements
2008	Tier 4	Division 2	Södra Svealand	8th	
2009	Tier 4	Division 2	Södra Svealand	5th	
2010	Tier 4	Division 2	Södra Svealand	10th	Relegation Playoffs
2011	Tier 4	Division 2	Södra Svealand	10th	Relegation Playoffs
2012	Tier 4	Division 2	Södra Svealand	9th	
2013	Tier 4	Division 2	Södra Svealand	10th	
2014	Tier 4	Division 2	Södra Svealand	11th	
2015	Tier 4	Division 2	Södra Svealand	7th	
2016	Tier 4	Division 2	Norra Svealand	3rd	
2017	Tier 4	Division 2	Norra Svealand	4th	
2018	Tier 4	Division 2	Norra Svealand	5th	
2019	Tier 4	Division 2	Norra Svealand	8th	
2020	Tier 4	Division 2	Södra Svealand	10th	

== Attendances ==
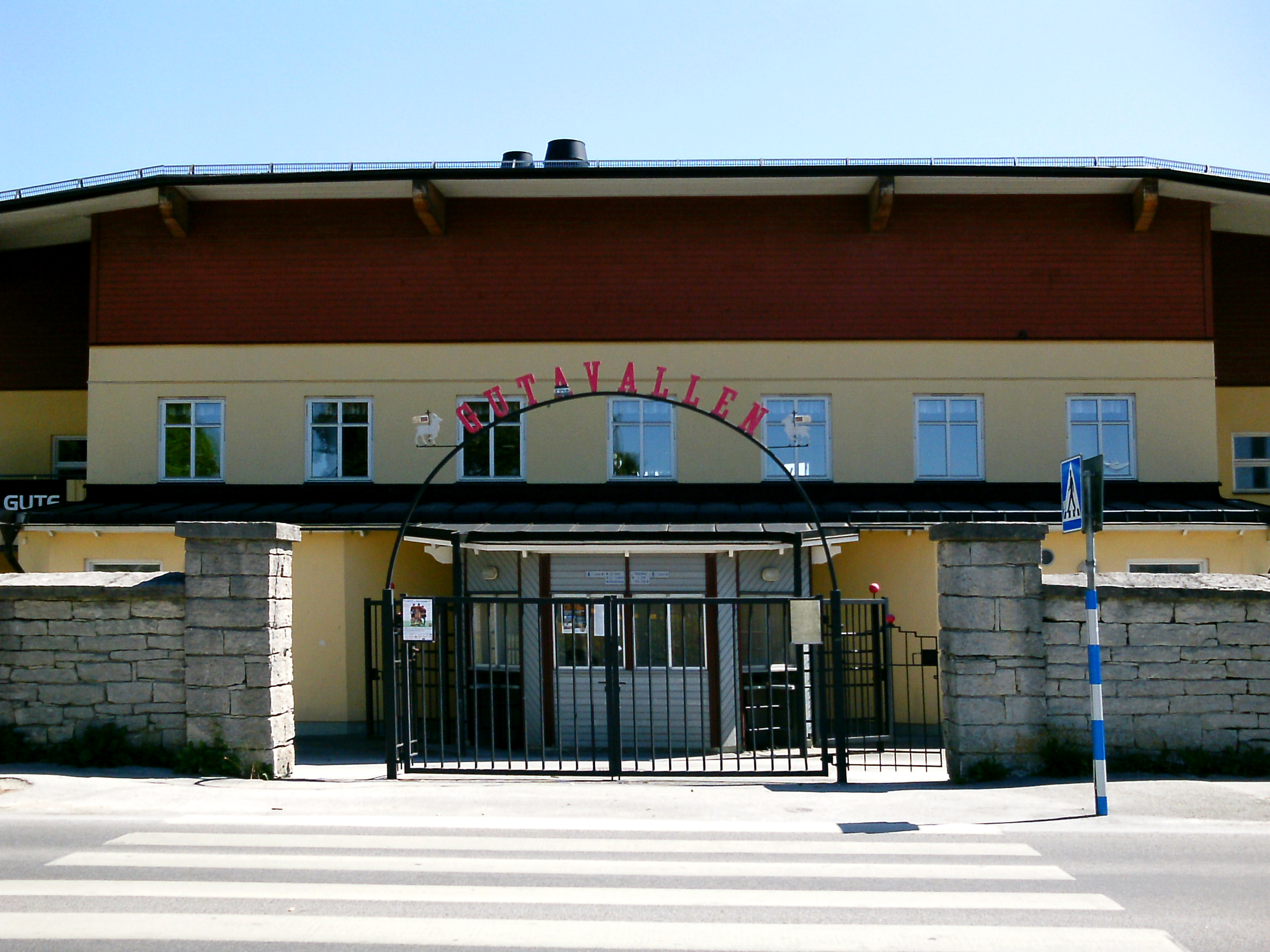
Entrance to Gutavallen, Visby

In recent seasons FC Gute have had the following average attendances:

Season	Average attendance	Division / Section	Level
2008	295	Div 2 Södra Svealand	Tier 4
2009	374	Div 2 Södra Svealand	Tier 4
2010	336	Div 2 Södra Svealand	Tier 4
2011	411	Div 2 Södra Svealand	Tier 4
2012	284	Div 2 Södra Svealand	Tier 4
2013	240	Div 2 Södra Svealand	Tier 4
2014	154	Div 2 Södra Svealand	Tier 4
2015	311	Div 2 Södra Svealand	Tier 4
2016	492	Div 2 Norra Svealand	Tier 4
2017	435	Div 2 Norra Svealand	Tier 4
2018	341	Div 2 Norra Svealand	Tier 4
2019	256	Div 2 Norra Svealand	Tier 4
2020	?	Div 2 Norra Svealand	Tier 4

* Attendances are provided in the Publikliga sections of the Svenska Fotbollförbundet website.
