= Götene =

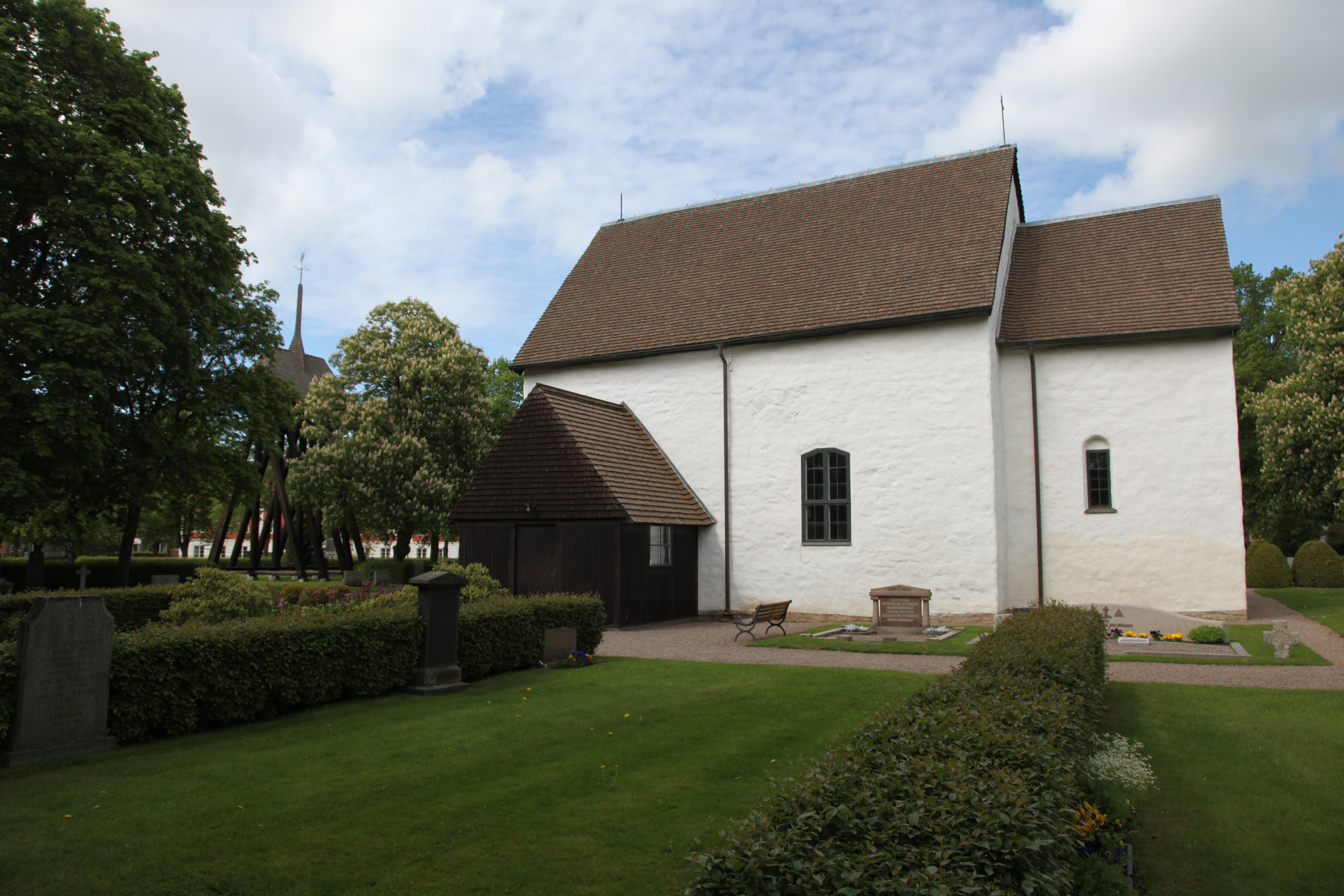
- Götene Church (24 May 2009)

- Location within Västra Götaland Location within Sweden
- Coordinates: 58°32′N 13°29′E
- Country: Sweden
- Province: Västergötland
- County: Västra Götaland County
- Municipality: Götene Municipality

Area
  - Total: 4.59 km^{2} (1.77 sq mi)

Population (31 December 2010)
  - Total: 4,933
  - Density: 1,074/km^{2} (2,780/sq mi)
- Time zone: UTC+1 (CET)
  - Summer (DST): UTC+2 (CEST)

Götene is a locality and the seat of Götene Municipality, Västra Götaland County, Sweden. It had 4,933 inhabitants in 2010.

== Sports ==
The following sports clubs are located in Götene:

- Götene IF
