= Korsnäs IF FK =

Swedish football club

- Full name: Korsnäs Idrottsförening Fotbollklubb
- Nickname: KIF
- Founded: 1904
- Ground: Lindvallen; Falun; Sweden
- Chairman: Anders Liljekvist
- League: Division 3 Södra Norrland
Home colours

Korsnäs IF FK is a Swedish football club located in Falun.

Despite the name, the club is not located in Korsnäs but in the neighboring suburb of Hosjö.

Korsnäs IF FK also has their own chant called Kif i mitt hjärta.

== Background ==
Korsnäs IF FK currently plays in Division 3 Södra Norrland which is the fifth tier of Swedish football. They play their home matches at Lindvallen in Falun.

The club is affiliated to Dalarnas Fotbollförbund. Korsnäs IF have competed in the Svenska Cupen on 23 occasions and have played 59 matches in the competition.

== Season to season ==
Season	Level	Division	Section	Position	Movements
1993	Tier 5	Division 4	Dalarna	1st	Promoted
1994	Tier 4	Division 3	Södra Norrland	4th	
1995	Tier 4	Division 3	Södra Norrland	3rd	
1996	Tier 4	Division 3	Södra Norrland	3rd	
1997	Tier 4	Division 3	Södra Norrland	2nd	Promotion Playoffs
1998	Tier 4	Division 3	Södra Norrland	8th	
1999	Tier 4	Division 3	Södra Norrland	5th	
2000	Tier 4	Division 3	Södra Norrland	7th	
2001	Tier 4	Division 3	Södra Norrland	11th	Relegated
2002	Tier 5	Division 4	Dalarna	2nd	Promotion Playoffs
2003	Tier 5	Division 4	Dalarna	1st	Promoted
2004	Tier 4	Division 3	Södra Norrland	7th	
2005	Tier 4	Division 3	Södra Norrland	9th	
2006*	Tier 5	Division 3	Södra Norrland	7th	
2007	Tier 5	Division 3	Södra Norrland	12th	Relegated
2008	Tier 6	Division 4	Dalarna	2nd	Promoted
2009	Tier 5	Division 3	Södra Norrland	4th	
2010	Tier 5	Division 3	Södra Norrland	11th	Relegated
2011	Tier 6	Division 4	Dalarna	2nd	
2012	Tier 6	Division 4	Dalarna	1st	Promoted
2013	Tier 5	Division 3	Södra Norrland	6th	
2014	Tier 5	Division 3	Södra Norrland	3rd	
2015	Tier 5	Division 3	Södra Norrland	5th	
2016	Tier 5	Division 3	Södra Norrland	10th	Relegated
2017	Tier 6	Division 4	Dalarna	4th	
2018	Tier 6	Division 4	Dalarna	3rd	
2019	Tier 6	Division 4	Dalarna	1st	Promoted
2020	Tier 5	Division 3	Södra Norrland	6th	

* League restructuring in 2006 resulted in a new division being created at Tier 3 and subsequent divisions dropping a level.
