= Slätta SK =

Swedish football club

- Full name: Slätta Sportklubb
- Founded: 1976
- Ground: Dalavallen; Falun; Sweden
- Chairman: Erik Berggren
- League: Division 4 Dalarna
Home colours

Slätta SK is a Swedish football club located in Falun.

== Background ==
Slätta SK currently plays in Division 4 Dalarna which is the sixth tier of Swedish football. They play their home matches at the Dalavallen in Falun.

The club is affiliated to Dalarnas Fotbollförbund.

== Season to season ==
Season	Level	Division	Section	Position	Movements
1976	Tier 4	Division 4	Dalarna	13th	Relegated
1977	Tier 5	Division 5	Dalarna Mellersta	2nd	
1978	Tier 5	Division 5	Dalarna Södra	1st	Promoted
1979	Tier 4	Division 4	Dalarna	4th	
1980	Tier 4	Division 4	Dalarna	7th	
1981	Tier 4	Division 4	Dalarna	3rd	
1982	Tier 4	Division 4	Dalarna	5th	
1983	Tier 4	Division 4	Dalarna	7th	
1984	Tier 4	Division 4	Dalarna	2nd	
1985	Tier 4	Division 4	Dalarna	9th	
1986	Tier 4	Division 4	Dalarna	10th	
1987*	Tier 5	Division 4	Dalarna	11th	Relegated
1988	Tier 6	Division 5	Dalarna Mellersta	7nd	Relegated
1989	Tier 7	Division 6	Dalarna Östra	1st	Promoted
1990	Tier 6	Division 5	Dalarna Södra	1st	Promoted
1991	Tier 5	Division 4	Dalarna	9th	
1992	Tier 5	Division 4	Dalarna	3rd	
1993	Tier 5	Division 4	Dalarna	2nd	
1994	Tier 5	Division 4	Dalarna	1st	Promoted
1995	Tier 4	Division 3	Sydöstra Norrland	6th	
1996	Tier 4	Division 3	Södra Norrland	5th	
1997	Tier 4	Division 3	Södra Norrland	8th	
1998	Tier 4	Division 3	Södra Norrland	6th	
1999	Tier 4	Division 3	Södra Norrland	1st	Promoted
2000	Tier 3	Division 2	Östra Svealand	5th	
2001	Tier 3	Division 2	Östra Svealand	9th	
2002	Tier 3	Division 2	Östra Svealand	9th	
2003	Tier 3	Division 2	Västra Svealand	11th	Relegated
2004	Tier 4	Division 3	Södra Norrland	1st	Promoted
2005	Tier 3	Division 2	Norra Svealand	9th	
2006*	Tier 4	Division 2	Norra Svealand	8th	Withdrew
2007					
2008					
2009	Tier 8	Division 6	Dalarna Mellersta	3rd	
2010	Tier 8	Division 6	Dalarna Mellersta	2nd	Promoted
2011	Tier 7	Division 5	Dalarna Norra	1st	Promoted
2012	Tier 6	Division 4	Dalarna	11th	Relegated
2013	Tier 7	Division 5	Dalarna	6th	
2014	Tier 7	Division 5	Dalarna	2nd	Promotion Playoffs -Promoted
2015	Tier 6	Division 4	Dalarna	5th	
2016	Tier 6	Division 4	Dalarna	2nd	Promotion Playoffs- Promoted
2017	Tier 5	Division 3	Södra Norrland	7th	
2018	Tier 5	Division 3	Södra Norrland	2nd	Promotion Playoffs - Not promoted
2019	Tier 5	Division 3	Södra Norrland	10th	Relegated
2020	Tier 6	Division 4	Dalarna		

* League restructuring in 1987 resulted in a new division being created at Tier 2 and subsequent divisions dropping a level.

* League restructuring in 2006 resulted in a new division being created at Tier 3 and subsequent divisions dropping a level.

== Attendances ==
In recent seasons Slätta SK have had the following average attendances:

Season	Average Attendance	Division / Section	Level
2017	92	Div 3 Södra Norrland	Tier 5
2018	80	Div 3 Södra Norrland	Tier 5

* Attendances are provided in the Publikliga sections of the Svenska Fotbollförbundet website.
