= 2003 in Swedish football =

The 2003 season in Swedish football started in January 2003 and ended in December 2003.

== Honours ==
=== Official titles ===
Title	Team	Reason
Swedish Champions 2003	Djurgårdens IF	Winners of Allsvenskan
Swedish Cup Champions 2003	IF Elfsborg	Winners of Svenska Cupen

=== Competitions ===
Level	Competition	Team
1st level	Allsvenskan 2003	Djurgårdens IF
2nd level	Superettan 2003	Kalmar FF
Cup	Svenska Cupen 2003	IF Elfsborg

== Promotions, relegations and qualifications ==
=== Promotions ===
Promoted from	Promoted to	Team	Reason
Superettan 2003	Allsvenskan 2004	Kalmar FF	Winners
Superettan 2003	Allsvenskan 2004	Trelleborgs FF	2nd team
Division 2 2003	Superettan 2004	Friska Viljor FC	Winners of promotion play-off
Division 2 2003	Superettan 2004	GAIS	Winners of promotion play-off
Division 2 2003	Superettan 2004	IK Brage	Winners of promotion play-off

=== Relegations ===
Relegated from	Relegated to	Team	Reason
Allsvenskan 2003	Superettan 2004	Östers IF	13th team
Allsvenskan 2003	Superettan 2004	Enköpings SK	14th team
Superettan 2003	Division 2 2004	IFK Malmö	14th team
Superettan 2003	Division 2 2004	BK Forward	15th team
Superettan 2003	Division 2 2004	IF Sylvia	16th team

=== International qualifications ===
Qualified for	Enters	Team	Reason
UEFA Champions League 2004–05	2nd qualifying round	Djurgårdens IF	Winners of Allsvenskan
UEFA Cup 2004–05	2nd qualifying round	Hammarby IF	2nd team in Allsvenskan
UEFA Cup 2004–05	2nd qualifying round	IF Elfsborg	Winners of Svenska Cupen
UEFA Cup 2004–05	1st qualifying round	Östers IF	UEFA Fair Play winners
UEFA Intertoto Cup 2004	1st round	Malmö FF	3rd team in Allsvenskan

== Domestic results ==
=== Allsvenskan ===
Pos	Team	Pld	W	D	L	GF	GA	GD	Pts	Qualification or relegation
1	Djurgårdens IF (C)	26	19	1	6	62	26	+36	58	Qualification to Champions League second qualifying round
2	Hammarby IF	26	15	6	5	50	30	+20	51	Qualification to UEFA Cup second qualifying round
3	Malmö FF	26	14	6	6	50	23	+27	48	Qualification to Intertoto Cup first round
4	Örgryte IS	26	14	3	9	42	40	+2	45	
5	AIK	26	11	6	9	39	34	+5	39	
6	Helsingborgs IF	26	11	5	10	35	36	−1	38	
7	IFK Göteborg	26	10	7	9	37	28	+9	37	
8	Örebro SK	26	10	7	9	29	33	−4	37	
9	Halmstads BK	26	11	3	12	41	37	+4	36	
10	IF Elfsborg	26	9	7	10	29	34	−5	34	Qualification to UEFA Cup second qualifying round (Note: Elfsborg qualified for the UEFA Cup as Svenska Cupen champions 2003.)
11	Landskrona BoIS	26	8	8	10	26	39	−13	32	
12	GIF Sundsvall (O)	26	3	10	13	25	43	−18	19	Qualification to Relegation play-offs
13	Östers IF (Note: Sweden was among the best three associations in the UEFA Fair Play ranking and thus received an additional spot in the first qualifying round of the Europa League, Öster received the qualifying spot for their ranking in Allsvenskans Fair Play ranking.) (R)	26	3	8	15	31	56	−25	17	UEFA Cup qualifying and relegation to Superettan
14	Enköpings SK (R)	26	3	5	18	22	59	−37	14	Relegation to Superettan

Source: svenskfotboll.se (in Swedish)
Rules for classification: 1) points; 2) goal difference; 3) number of goals scored.
(C) Champions; (O) Play-off winners; (R) Relegated

=== 2003 Allsvenskan qualification play-off ===
October 30, 2003

BK Häcken	1–2	GIF Sundsvall

?, Gothenburg
November 2, 2003

GIF Sundsvall	(ag) 0–1	BK Häcken

?, Sundsvall

=== Superettan ===
Pos	Team	Pld	W	D	L	GF	GA	GD	Pts	Promotion, qualification or relegation
1	Kalmar FF (C, P)	30	21	4	5	51	28	+23	67	Promotion to Allsvenskan
2	Trelleborgs FF (P)	30	18	6	6	63	33	+30	60	Promotion to Allsvenskan
3	BK Häcken	30	18	3	9	56	40	+16	57	Qualification to Promotion playoffs
4	Åtvidabergs FF	30	13	9	8	47	37	+10	48	
5	Västra Frölunda	30	14	6	10	47	40	+7	48	
6	IF Brommapojkarna	30	13	6	11	41	41	0	45	
7	Café Opera United	30	11	8	11	53	48	+5	41	
8	Gefle IF	30	11	7	12	46	51	−5	40	
9	IFK Norrköping	30	10	9	11	47	49	−2	39	
10	Assyriska FF	30	12	3	15	47	53	−6	39	
11	Boden	30	10	9	11	43	50	−7	39	
12	Västerås SK	30	10	7	13	44	48	−4	37	
13	Falkenbergs FF	30	10	4	16	37	44	−7	34	
14	IFK Malmö (R)	30	10	3	17	42	58	−16	33	Relegation to Division 2
15	BK Forward (R)	30	7	5	18	45	63	−18	26	Relegation to Division 2
16	IF Sylvia (R)	30	4	7	19	34	60	−26	19	Relegation to Division 2

Source: svenskfotboll.se (in Swedish)
Rules for classification: 1) points; 2) goal difference; 3) number of goals scored.
(C) Champions; (P) Promoted; (R) Relegated

=== 2003 Svenska Cupen ===
Quarter-finals

August 7, 2003

Assyriska Föreningen	4–1	IFK Göteborg

Bårsta IP, Södertälje

August 7, 2003

Väsby IK	1–4	IF Elfsborg

Vilundavallen, Upplands Väsby

August 28, 2003

Halmstads BK	2–1	Trelleborgs FF

Örjans Vall, Halmstad

October 2, 2003

Djurgårdens IF	2–1	AIK

Stockholms Stadion, Stockholm

Semi-finals

September 25, 2003

Halmstads BK	0–4	IF Elfsborg

Örjans Vall, Halmstad

October 16, 2003

Djurgårdens IF	0–4	Assyriska Föreningen

Stockholms Stadion, Stockholm

Final

November 1, 2003

IF Elfsborg	2–0	Assyriska Föreningen

Råsunda, Solna
