= 2000 in Swedish football =

The 2000 season in Swedish football, starting January 2000 and ending December 2000:

== Honours ==
=== Official titles ===
Title	Team	Reason
Swedish Champions 2000	Halmstads BK	Winners of Allsvenskan
Swedish Cup Champions 1999–2000	Örgryte IS	Winners of Svenska Cupen

=== Competitions ===
Level	Competition	Team
1st level	Allsvenskan 2000	Halmstads BK
2nd level	Superettan 2000	Djurgårdens IF
Cup	Svenska Cupen 1999–2000	Örgryte IS

== Promotions, relegations and qualifications ==
=== Promotions ===
Promoted from	Promoted to	Team	Reason
Superettan 2000	Allsvenskan 2001	Djurgårdens IF	Winners
Superettan 2000	Allsvenskan 2001	Malmö FF	2nd team
Division 2 2000	Superettan 2001	Gefle IF	Winners of promotion play-off
Division 2 2000	Superettan 2001	Motala AIF	Winners of promotion play-off
Division 2 2000	Superettan 2001	IFK Malmö	Winners of promotion play-off

=== Relegations ===
Relegated from	Relegated to	Team	Reason
Allsvenskan 2000	Superettan 2001	GAIS	13th team
Allsvenskan 2000	Superettan 2001	Västra Frölunda IF	14th team
Superettan 2000	Division 2 2001	Åtvidabergs FF	14th team
Superettan 2000	Division 2 2001	Panos Ljungskile SK	15th team
Superettan 2000	Division 2 2001	Gunnilse IS	16th team

=== International qualifications ===
Qualified for	Enters	Team	Reason
UEFA Champions League 2001–02	2nd qualifying round	Halmstads BK	Winners of Allsvenskan
UEFA Cup 2001–02	Qualifying round	Helsingborgs IF	2nd team in Allsvenskan
UEFA Cup 2000–01	Qualifying round	Örgryte IS	Winners of Svenska Cupen
UEFA Intertoto Cup 2001	1st round	AIK	3rd team in Allsvenskan

== Domestic results ==
=== Allsvenskan ===
Pos	Team	Pld	W	D	L	GF	GA	GD	Pts	Qualification or relegation
1	Halmstads BK (C)	26	16	4	6	47	24	+23	52	Qualification to Champions League second qualifying round
2	Helsingborgs IF	26	14	4	8	51	30	+21	46	Qualification to UEFA Cup qualifying round
3	AIK	26	13	6	7	38	30	+8	45	Qualification to Intertoto Cup first round
4	IFK Göteborg	26	12	8	6	46	33	+13	44	
5	IF Elfsborg	26	13	4	9	43	37	+6	43	Qualification to UEFA Cup qualifying round (Note: Elfsborg qualified for the UEFA Cup as Svenska Cupen champions 2000–01.)
6	Trelleborgs FF	26	10	8	8	30	28	+2	38	
7	Örgryte IS	26	11	4	11	32	32	0	37	
8	Hammarby IF	26	10	6	10	34	38	−4	36	
9	IFK Norrköping	26	8	11	7	40	31	+9	35	
10	Örebro SK	26	9	6	11	44	40	+4	33	
11	GIF Sundsvall	26	7	8	11	34	42	−8	29	
12	BK Häcken (O)	26	4	13	9	40	52	−12	25	Qualification to Relegation play-offs
13	GAIS (R)	26	4	8	14	26	43	−17	20	Relegation to Superettan
14	Västra Frölunda (R)	26	3	6	17	17	62	−45	15	Relegation to Superettan

Rules for classification: 1) points; 2) goal difference; 3) number of goals scored.
(C) Champions; (O) Play-off winners; (R) Relegated

=== 2000 Allsvenskan qualification play-off ===
November 8, 2000

Mjällby AIF	3–2	BK Häcken

?, Hällevik
November 12, 2000

BK Häcken	3–2 3–2 (aet) 6–4 (apen)	Mjällby AIF

?, Gothenburg

=== Superettan ===
Pos	Team	Pld	W	D	L	GF	GA	GD	Pts	Promotion, qualification or relegation
1	Djurgårdens IF (C, P)	30	20	3	7	68	32	+36	63	Promotion to Allsvenskan
2	Malmö FF (P)	30	18	6	6	47	33	+14	60	Promotion to Allsvenskan
3	Mjällby AIF	30	15	8	7	56	31	+25	53	Qualification to Promotion playoffs
4	Landskrona BoIS	30	16	4	10	59	37	+22	52	
5	Västerås SK	30	14	9	7	50	39	+11	51	
6	Café Opera United	30	13	7	10	53	44	+9	46	
7	Enköpings SK	30	11	7	12	23	31	−8	40	
8	IK Brage	30	10	9	11	36	41	−5	39	
9	IF Sylvia	30	10	7	13	47	54	−7	37	
10	Kalmar FF	30	9	8	13	40	42	−2	35	
11	Assyriska FF	30	9	8	13	36	40	−4	35	
12	Östers IF	30	9	6	15	39	51	−12	33	
13	Umeå FC	30	9	6	15	30	48	−18	33	
14	Åtvidabergs FF (R)	30	7	11	12	37	46	−9	32	Relegation to Division 2
15	Panos Ljungskile (R)	30	6	9	15	31	55	−24	27	Relegation to Division 2
16	Gunnilse (R)	30	6	8	16	26	54	−28	26	Relegation to Division 2

Rules for classification: 1) points; 2) goal difference; 3) number of goals scored.
(C) Champions; (P) Promoted; (R) Relegated

=== 1999–2000 Svenska Cupen ===
Final

May 25, 2000

Örgryte IS	2–0	AIK

Råsunda, Solna
