= 2009 in Swedish football =

The 2009 season in Swedish football, starting January 2009 and ending December 2009:

== Honours ==
=== Official titles ===
Title	Team	Reason
Swedish Champions 2009	AIK	Winners of Allsvenskan
Swedish Cup Champions 2009	AIK	Winners of Svenska Cupen
Swedish Super Cup Champions 2009	Kalmar FF	Winners of Supercupen

=== Competitions ===
Level	Competition	Team
1st level	Allsvenskan 2009	AIK
2nd level	Superettan 2009	Mjällby AIF
3rd level	Division 1 Norra 2009	Degerfors IF
3rd level	Division 1 Södra 2009	Östers IF
Cup	Svenska Cupen 2009	AIK
Super Cup	Supercupen 2009	Kalmar FF

== Promotions, relegations and qualifications ==
=== Promotions ===
Promoted from	Promoted to	Team	Reason
Superettan 2009	Allsvenskan 2010	Mjällby AIF	Winners
Superettan 2009	Allsvenskan 2010	Åtvidabergs FF	2nd team
Division 1 Norra 2009	Superettan 2010	Degerfors IF	Winners
Division 1 Norra 2009	Superettan 2010	IK Brage	Winners of qualification play-off
Division 1 Södra 2009	Superettan 2010	Östers IF	Winners
Division 2 2009	Division 1 2010	Bodens BK	Winners of group
Division 2 2009	Division 1 2010	Dalkurd FF	Winners of group
Division 2 2009	Division 1 2010	Hammarby Talang FF	Winners of group
Division 2 2009	Division 1 2010	Lunds BK	Winners of group
Division 2 2009	Division 1 2010	Norrby IF	Winners of group
Division 2 2009	Division 1 2010	Ytterby IS	Winners of group

=== Relegations ===
Relegated from	Relegated to	Team	Reason
Allsvenskan 2009	Superettan 2010	Örgryte IS	15th team
Allsvenskan 2009	Superettan 2010	Hammarby IF	16th team
Superettan 2009	Division 1 2010	Qviding FIF	Losers of qualification play-off
Superettan 2009	Division 1 2010	IK Sirius	15th team
Superettan 2009	Division 1 2010	Vasalunds IF	16th team
Division 1 Norra 2009	Division 2 2010	Karlsunds IF	12th team
Division 1 Norra 2009	Division 2 2010	Enköpings SK	13th team
Division 1 Norra 2009	Division 2 2010	Skellefteå FF	14th team
Division 1 Södra 2009	Division 2 2010	Motala AIF	12th team
Division 1 Södra 2009	Division 2 2010	IK Oddevold	13th team
Division 1 Södra 2009	Division 2 2010	Lindome GIF	14th team

=== International qualifications ===
Qualified for	Enters	Team	Reason
UEFA Champions League 2010–11	2nd qual. round	AIK	Winners of Allsvenskan
UEFA Europa League 2010–11	3rd qual. round	IFK Göteborg	Finalists of Svenska Cupen
UEFA Europa League 2010–11	2nd qual. round	IF Elfsborg	3rd team in Allsvenskan
UEFA Europa League 2010–11	1st qual. round	Kalmar FF	4th team in Allsvenskan
UEFA Europa League 2010–11	1st qual. round	Gefle IF	UEFA Fair Play winners

== Domestic results ==
=== 2009 Allsvenskan ===
Locations of the 2009 Allsvenskan teams

Pos	Team	Pld	W	D	L	GF	GA	GD	Pts	Qualification or relegation
1	AIK (C)	30	18	7	5	36	20	+16	61	Qualification to Champions League second qualifying round
2	IFK Göteborg	30	17	6	7	53	24	+29	57	Qualification to Europa League third qualifying round (Note: IFK Göteborg qualified for the Third qualifying round of the Europa League as Svenska Cupen champions 2009.)
3	IF Elfsborg	30	15	10	5	43	34	+9	55	Qualification to Europa League second qualifying round (Note: Elfsborg qualified for the Second qualifying round of the Europa League as they received IFK Göteborg's initial qualifying spot.)
4	Kalmar FF	30	14	8	8	53	39	+14	50	Qualification to Europa League first qualifying round (Note: Kalmar FF qualified for the Europa League as they received Elfsborgs initial qualifying spot.)
5	BK Häcken	30	13	9	8	43	30	+13	48	
6	Örebro SK	30	12	9	9	33	32	+1	45	
7	Malmö FF	30	11	10	9	40	25	+15	43	
8	Helsingborgs IF	30	13	4	13	39	39	0	43	
9	Trelleborgs FF	30	11	8	11	41	34	+7	41	
10	Gefle IF	30	10	9	11	28	38	−10	39	Qualification to Europa League first qualifying round (Note: Sweden was among the best three associations in the UEFA Fair Play ranking and thus received an additional spot in the first qualifying round of the Europa League, Gefle received the qualifying spot for their ranking in Allsvenskans Fair Play ranking.)
11	GAIS	30	8	11	11	41	38	+3	35	
12	IF Brommapojkarna	30	9	7	14	32	46	−14	34	
13	Halmstads BK	30	8	8	14	29	43	−14	32	
14	Djurgårdens IF (O)	30	8	5	17	24	49	−25	29	Qualification to Relegation play-offs
15	Örgryte IS (R)	30	6	7	17	27	49	−22	25	Relegation to Superettan
16	Hammarby IF (R)	30	6	4	20	22	44	−22	22	Relegation to Superettan

Source: svenskfotboll.se (in Swedish)
Rules for classification: 1) points; 2) goal difference; 3) number of goals scored.
(C) Champions; (O) Play-off winners; (R) Relegated

=== 2009 Allsvenskan qualification play-off ===
November 4, 2009
19:15 CET (UTC+01)

Assyriska Föreningen	2–0	Djurgårdens IF
Östlund 38'; Marklund 47'

Södertälje Fotbollsarena, Södertälje
Attendance: 7,131
Referee: Daniel Stålhammar
November 9, 2009
16:45 CET (UTC+01)

Djurgårdens IF	3–0 (a.e.t.)	Assyriska Föreningen
Tauer 52'; Youssef 60'; Jonson 116'

Stockholms Stadion, Stockholm
Attendance: 10,458
Referee: Martin Ingvarsson

=== 2009 Superettan ===
Location of the Superettan 2009 teams

Pos	Team	Pld	W	D	L	GF	GA	GD	Pts	Promotion, qualification or relegation
1	Mjällby AIF (C, P)	30	19	8	3	60	19	+41	65	Promotion to Allsvenskan
2	Åtvidabergs FF (P)	30	17	6	7	53	36	+17	57	Promotion to Allsvenskan
3	Assyriska FF	30	15	6	9	46	38	+8	51	Qualification to Promotion playoffs
4	Syrianska FC	30	15	5	10	50	38	+12	50	
5	GIF Sundsvall	30	13	8	9	54	48	+6	47	
6	Falkenbergs FF	30	14	3	13	44	41	+3	45	
7	Ängelholms FF	30	13	5	12	43	45	−2	44	
8	Landskrona BoIS	30	12	4	14	51	46	+5	40	
9	Ljungskile SK	30	11	7	12	48	43	+5	40	
10	Jönköpings Södra IF	30	10	6	14	46	54	−8	36	
11	IFK Norrköping	30	8	11	11	45	44	+1	35	
12	FC Väsby United	30	8	9	13	28	41	−13	33	
13	FC Trollhättan (O)	30	8	8	14	30	46	−16	32	Qualification to Relegation playoffs
14	Qviding FIF (R)	30	7	10	13	31	45	−14	31	Qualification to Relegation playoffs
15	IK Sirius (R)	30	8	7	15	37	53	−16	31	Relegation to Division 1
16	Vasalunds IF (R)	30	8	5	17	35	64	−29	29	Relegation to Division 1

Source: svenskfotboll.se (in Swedish)
Rules for classification: 1) points; 2) goal difference; 3) number of goals scored.
(C) Champions; (O) Play-off winners; (P) Promoted; (R) Relegated

=== 2009 Superettan qualification play-off ===
October 31, 2009

Skövde AIK	1–2	FC Trollhättan

Södermalms IP, Skövde
November 4, 2009

FC Trollhättan	5–3	Skövde AIK

Edsborgs IP, Trollhättan

November 1, 2009

IK Brage	2–1	Qviding FIF

Domnarvsvallen, Borlänge
November 5, 2009

Qviding FIF	0–1	IK Brage

Valhalla IP, Gothenburg

=== 2009 Division 1 Norra ===

Pos	Team	Pld	W	D	L	GF	GA	GD	Pts	Promotion or relegation
1	Degerfors IF (C, P)	26	19	3	4	58	25	+33	60	Promotion to Superettan
2	IK Brage (O, P)	26	16	4	6	47	31	+16	52	Qualification to Promotion playoffs
3	Valsta Syrianska IK	26	14	6	6	54	36	+18	48	
4	Umeå FC	26	14	6	6	51	38	+13	48	
5	Västerås SK	26	11	4	11	49	37	+12	37	
6	Gröndal	26	9	8	9	37	43	−6	35	
7	Carlstad United BK	26	9	6	11	30	31	−1	33	
8	Arameiska-Syrianska KIF	26	9	5	12	30	38	−8	32	
9	BK Forward	26	8	7	11	41	45	−4	31	
10	Syrianska IF Kerburan	26	9	4	13	42	48	−6	31	
11	Östersunds FK	26	7	9	10	37	39	−2	30	
12	Karlslunds IF (R)	26	8	5	13	34	42	−8	29	Relegation to Division 2
13	Enköpings SK (R)	26	6	7	13	35	55	−20	25	Relegation to Division 2
14	Skellefteå FF (R)	26	3	6	17	27	64	−37	15	Relegation to Division 2

Source: svenskfotboll.se (in Swedish)
Rules for classification: 1) points; 2) goal difference; 3) number of goals scored.
(C) Champions; (O) Play-off winners; (P) Promoted; (R) Relegated

=== 2009 Division 1 Södra ===
Pos	Team	Pld	W	D	L	GF	GA	GD	Pts	Promotion or relegation
1	Östers IF (C, P)	26	14	4	8	47	35	+12	46	Promotion to Superettan
2	Skövde AIK	26	14	4	8	44	37	+7	46	Qualification to Promotion playoffs
3	IK Sleipner	26	14	3	9	44	29	+15	45	
4	Kristianstads FF	26	13	6	7	52	41	+11	45	
5	IF Limhamn Bunkeflo	26	11	7	8	41	33	+8	40	
6	Husqvarna FF	26	10	10	6	41	34	+7	40	
7	IFK Värnamo	26	10	8	8	39	36	+3	38	
8	FC Rosengård	26	9	8	9	39	36	+3	35	
9	IF Sylvia	26	9	7	10	38	48	−10	34	
10	Västra Frölunda	26	9	6	11	39	37	+2	33	
11	Torslanda IK	26	8	5	13	32	37	−5	29	
12	Motala AIF (R)	26	9	2	15	28	47	−19	29	Relegation to Division 2
13	IK Oddevold (R)	26	7	4	15	32	44	−12	25	Relegation to Division 2
14	Lindome (R)	26	4	8	14	25	47	−22	20	Relegation to Division 2

Source: svenskfotboll.se (in Swedish)
Rules for classification: 1) points; 2) goal difference; 3) number of goals scored.
(C) Champions; (P) Promoted; (R) Relegated

=== 2009 Svenska Cupen ===
Quarter-finals

June 28, 2009

Syrianska FC	1–3 (a.e.t.)	Helsingborgs IF

Södertälje Fotbollsarena, Södertälje

July 8, 2009

Mjällby AIF	1–2	AIK

Strandvallen, Hällevik

July 8, 2009

BK Häcken	1–0	Örebro SK

Rambergsvallen, Gothenburg

July 9, 2009

IFK Göteborg	3–1	Gefle IF

Gamla Ullevi, Gothenburg

Semi-finals

September 6, 2009

AIK	3–2 (a.e.t.)	BK Häcken

Råsunda, Solna

September 16, 2009

Helsingborgs IF	1–3	IFK Göteborg

Olympia, Helsingborg

Final

November 7, 2009
16:00 CET (UTC+01)

AIK	2–0	IFK Göteborg
Obolo 72'; Flávio 90'	Report

Råsunda, Solna
Attendance: 24,365
Referee: Jonas Eriksson

=== 2009 Supercupen ===
Final

March 21, 2009
16:00 CET (UTC+01)

Kalmar FF	1 – 0	IFK Göteborg
Daniel Mendes 89'	(Report)

Fredriksskans, Kalmar
Attendance: 2,305
Referee: Stefan Johanneson

== National team results ==
January 24, 2009
Friendly
No. 907

United States	3 – 2	Sweden
Kljestan 17', 39' (pen.), 74'		73' Nannskog; 89' Dahlberg

The Home Depot Center, Carson
Attendance: 9,918
Referee: Silvio Petrescu (Canada)

January 28, 2009
Friendly
No. 908

Mexico	0 – 1	Sweden
		57' Farnerud

Oakland–Alameda County Coliseum, Oakland
Attendance: 46,550
Referee: Paul Ward (United States)

February 11, 2009
Friendly
No. 909

Austria	0 – 2	Sweden
		55' R. Elm; 63' Källström

UPC-Arena, Graz
Attendance: 11,800
Referee: Viktor Kassai (Hungary)

March 28, 2009
2010 World Cup qualification
No. 910

Portugal	0 – 0	Sweden

Estádio do Dragão, Porto
Attendance: 40,230
Referee: Frank De Bleeckere (Belgium)

April 1, 2009
Friendly
No. 911

Serbia	2 – 0	Sweden
Žigić 1'; Janković 82'

Stadion FK Partizan, Belgrade
Attendance: 17,830
Referee: Antonio Rubinos Perez (Spain)

June 6, 2009
2010 World Cup qualification
No. 912

Sweden	0 – 1	Denmark
		22' Kahlenberg

Råsunda Stadium, Solna
Attendance: 33,619
Referee: Michael Riley (England)

June 10, 2009
2010 World Cup qualification
No. 913

Sweden	4 – 0	Malta
Källström 22'; Majstorović 52'; Ibrahimović 56'; Berg 58'

Ullevi, Gothenburg
Attendance: 25,271
Referee: Calum Murray (Scotland)

August 12, 2009
Friendly
No. 914

Sweden	1 – 0	Finland
Elmander 42'

Råsunda Stadium, Solna
Attendance: 15,212
Referee: Freddy Fautrel (France)

September 5, 2009
2010 World Cup qualification
No. 915

Hungary	1 – 2	Sweden
Huszti 79' (pen.)		8' Mellberg; 90+4' Ibrahimović

Puskás Ferenc Stadium, Budapest
Attendance: 42,000
Referee: Nicola Rizzoli (Italy)

September 9, 2009
2010 World Cup qualification
No. 916

Malta	0 – 1	Sweden
		82' (o.g.) Azzopardi

Ta' Qali National Stadium, Ta' Qali
Attendance: 5,000
Referee: Adrian McCourt (Northern Ireland)

October 10, 2009
2010 World Cup qualification
No. 917

Denmark	1 – 0	Sweden
J. Poulsen 79'

Parken Stadium, Copenhagen
Attendance: 37,751
Referee: Manuel Mejuto González (Spain)

October 14, 2009
2010 World Cup qualification
No. 918

Sweden	4 – 1	Albania
Mellberg 6', 42'; Berg 40'; Svensson 86'		57' Salihi

Råsunda Stadium, Solna
Attendance: 25,342
Referee: Nikolaj Ivanov (Russia)

November 18, 2009
Friendly
No. 919

Italy	1 – 0	Sweden
Chiellini 26'

Stadio Dino Manuzzi, Cesena
Attendance: 22,827
Referee: Damir Skomina (Slovenia)
