= 2003 Superettan =

Superettan
- Season: 2003
- Champions: Kalmar FF
- Promoted: Kalmar FF; Trelleborgs FF
- Relegated: IFK Malmö; Forward; Sylvia
- Matches played: 240

The 2003 Superettan was part of the 2003 Swedish football season, and the fourth season of Superettan, Sweden's second-tier football division in its current format. A total of 16 teams contested the league.

== Overview ==
It was contested by 16 teams, and Kalmar FF won the championship.

== League table ==
Pos	Team	Pld	W	D	L	GF	GA	GD	Pts	Promotion, qualification or relegation
1	Kalmar FF (C, P)	30	21	4	5	51	28	+23	67	Promotion to Allsvenskan
2	Trelleborgs FF (P)	30	18	6	6	63	33	+30	60	Promotion to Allsvenskan
3	BK Häcken	30	18	3	9	56	40	+16	57	Qualification to Promotion playoffs
4	Åtvidabergs FF	30	13	9	8	47	37	+10	48	
5	Västra Frölunda	30	14	6	10	47	40	+7	48	
6	IF Brommapojkarna	30	13	6	11	41	41	0	45	
7	Café Opera United	30	11	8	11	53	48	+5	41	
8	Gefle IF	30	11	7	12	46	51	−5	40	
9	IFK Norrköping	30	10	9	11	47	49	−2	39	
10	Assyriska FF	30	12	3	15	47	53	−6	39	
11	Boden	30	10	9	11	43	50	−7	39	
12	Västerås SK	30	10	7	13	44	48	−4	37	
13	Falkenbergs FF	30	10	4	16	37	44	−7	34	
14	IFK Malmö (R)	30	10	3	17	42	58	−16	33	Relegation to Division 2
15	BK Forward (R)	30	7	5	18	45	63	−18	26	Relegation to Division 2
16	IF Sylvia (R)	30	4	7	19	34	60	−26	19	Relegation to Division 2

Source: svenskfotboll.se (in Swedish)
Rules for classification: 1) points; 2) goal difference; 3) number of goals scored.
(C) Champions; (P) Promoted; (R) Relegated

== Season statistics ==
=== Top scorers ===
Rank	Player	Club	Goals
1	(Sweden) Göran Marklund	Café Opera/Djursholm	23
2	(Sweden) Mats Lilienberg	Trelleborgs FF	18
3	(Liberia) Dioh Williams	BK Häcken	16
4	(Sweden) Mats Haglund	Åtvidabergs FF	15
5	(Sweden) Niclas Fredriksson	IFK Norrköping	14
5	(Sweden) Daniel Westlin	Gefle IF	14
5	(Brazil) Daniel Mendes	Kalmar FF	14
8	(Sweden) Stefan Bärlin	Västerås SK	13
8	(Sweden) Magnus Eriksson	IFK Malmö	13
10	(Sweden) Christos Christoforidis	Assyriska	12
10	(Sweden) Henrik Andersson	BK Forward	12
