= 2003 Division 2 (Swedish football) =

Swedish football league

The following are the statistics of the Swedish football Division 2 for the 2003 season.

== League standings ==
=== Division 2 Norrland ===
Pos	Team	Pld	W	D	L	GF	GA	GD	Pts	Qualification or relegation
1	Friska Viljor	22	17	2	3	56	23	+33	53	Promotion Playoffs
2	Östersunds FK	22	15	4	3	49	19	+30	49	
3	Robertsfors	22	12	5	5	30	26	+4	41	
4	Umeå FC	22	8	9	5	43	22	+21	33	
5	Piteå IF	22	7	10	5	36	28	+8	31	
6	IK Sirius	22	9	4	9	48	43	+5	31	
7	IFK Luleå	22	8	4	10	34	35	−1	28	
8	IFK Timrå	22	7	6	9	24	26	−2	27	
9	Skellefteå AIK	22	6	9	7	27	36	−9	27	
10	Kiruna	22	5	4	13	30	55	−25	19	Division 3 Relegation Playoffs
11	IFK Östersund (R)	22	3	5	14	21	44	−23	14	Relegation to Division 3
12	Sunnanå SK (R)	22	3	2	17	23	64	−41	11	Relegation to Division 3

Rules for classification: 1) points; 2) goal difference; 3) number of goals scored.
(R) Relegated

=== Division 2 Östra Svealand ===
Pos	Team	Pld	W	D	L	GF	GA	GD	Pts	Qualification or relegation
1	Väsby IK	22	13	4	5	41	24	+17	43	Promotion Playoffs
2	Valsta Syrianska IK	22	12	5	5	41	24	+17	41	
3	Visby IF Gute	22	11	4	7	40	30	+10	37	
4	Spårvägen	22	11	4	7	38	33	+5	37	
5	Topkapi	22	9	7	6	36	31	+5	34	
6	IK Sleipner	22	11	1	10	46	44	+2	34	
7	Vasalund/Essinge IF	22	8	7	7	42	30	+12	31	
8	Vallentuna	22	8	7	7	42	30	+12	31	
9	Syrianska FC	22	8	6	8	38	36	+2	30	
10	Tyresö FF	22	7	2	13	28	44	−16	23	Division 3 Relegation Playoffs
11	Linköping (R)	22	5	4	13	25	48	−23	19	Relegation to Division 3
12	Smedby (R)	22	1	5	16	16	54	−38	8	Relegation to Division 3

Rules for classification: 1) points; 2) goal difference; 3) number of goals scored.
(R) Relegated

=== Division 2 Västra Svealand ===
Pos	Team	Pld	W	D	L	GF	GA	GD	Pts	Qualification or relegation
1	IK Brage	22	18	3	1	61	21	+40	57	Promotion Playoffs
2	Degerfors IF	22	15	4	3	59	28	+31	49	
3	Rynninge	22	12	3	7	41	34	+7	39	
4	IFK Ölme	22	11	3	8	40	27	+13	36	
5	Eskilstuna City	22	9	3	10	49	46	+3	30	
6	Karlslunds IF	22	9	2	11	38	43	−5	29	
7	Ludvika FK	22	7	5	10	34	41	−7	26	
8	Falu BS	22	5	9	8	33	47	−14	24	
9	Skiljebo SK	22	6	5	11	40	49	−9	23	
10	Strömtorps IK	22	6	5	11	34	47	−13	23	Division 3 Relegation Playoffs
11	Slätta (R)	22	5	5	12	26	43	−17	20	Relegation to Division 3
12	Forssa (R)	22	5	1	16	25	54	−29	16	Relegation to Division 3

Rules for classification: 1) points; 2) goal difference; 3) number of goals scored.
(R) Relegated

=== Division 2 Östra Götaland ===
Pos	Team	Pld	W	D	L	GF	GA	GD	Pts	Qualification or relegation
1	Jönköpings Södra IF	22	15	4	3	65	27	+38	49	Promotion Playoffs
2	Husqvarna FF	22	14	5	3	63	34	+29	47	
3	Tidaholms GIF	22	12	3	7	63	46	+17	39	
4	Myresjö IF	22	10	7	5	36	32	+4	37	
5	Växjö BK	22	10	6	6	27	33	−6	36	
6	IFK Värnamo	22	10	5	7	38	31	+7	35	
7	Tord	22	9	4	9	51	64	−13	31	
8	Grimsås	22	8	2	12	30	39	−9	26	
9	Sandared	22	5	5	12	32	58	−26	20	
10	Skene	22	4	6	12	30	46	−16	18	Division 3 Relegation Playoffs
11	Växjö Norra IF (R)	22	3	6	13	27	56	−29	15	Relegation to Division 3
12	Motala AIF (R)	22	3	5	14	30	46	−16	14	Relegation to Division 3

Rules for classification: 1) points; 2) goal difference; 3) number of goals scored.
(R) Relegated

=== Division 2 Västra Götaland ===
Pos	Team	Pld	W	D	L	GF	GA	GD	Pts	Qualification or relegation
1	GAIS	22	16	3	3	49	20	+29	51	Promotion Playoffs
2	Ljungskile SK	22	16	3	3	40	19	+21	51	
3	Gunnilse	22	11	7	4	39	28	+11	40	
4	Torslanda IK	22	12	4	6	40	30	+10	40	
5	FC Trollhättan	22	8	6	8	39	35	+4	30	
6	Floda	22	8	5	9	43	35	+8	29	
7	Qviding FIF	22	8	5	9	25	30	−5	29	
8	Skärhamn	22	6	6	10	27	41	−14	24	
9	Jonsered	22	6	4	12	32	40	−8	22	
10	Ytterby	22	5	7	10	21	34	−13	22	Division 3 Relegation Playoffs
11	Lunden (R)	22	4	5	13	28	45	−17	17	Relegation to Division 3
12	Mellerud (R)	22	2	5	15	19	55	−36	11	Relegation to Division 3

Rules for classification: 1) points; 2) goal difference; 3) number of goals scored.
(R) Relegated

=== Division 2 Södra Götaland ===
Pos	Team	Pld	W	D	L	GF	GA	GD	Pts	Qualification or relegation
1	Mjällby AIF	22	12	7	3	51	21	+30	43	Promotion Playoffs
2	Ängelholms FF	22	12	7	3	39	17	+22	43	
3	Höllvikens GIF	22	11	3	8	33	32	+1	36	
4	Laholm	22	10	5	7	35	29	+6	35	
5	Kristianstads FF	22	10	2	10	40	39	+1	32	
6	Högaborg	22	6	10	6	32	38	−6	28	
7	Bunkeflo	22	8	4	10	31	37	−6	28	
8	IFK Hässleholm	22	8	4	10	36	45	−9	28	
9	Lunds BK	22	6	9	7	22	18	+4	27	
10	Karlskrona	22	6	5	11	30	40	−10	23	Division 3 Relegation Playoffs
11	Ystad (R)	22	6	4	12	29	45	−16	22	Relegation to Division 3
12	Ljungby (R)	22	2	10	10	27	44	−17	16	Relegation to Division 3

Rules for classification: 1) points; 2) goal difference; 3) number of goals scored.
(R) Relegated
