= 2009 Superettan =

Superettan
- Season: 2009
- Champions: Mjällby AIF
- Promoted: Mjällby AIF; Åtvidabergs FF
- Relegated: IK Sirius; Vasalunds IF
- Matches: 240
- Goals: 701 (2.92 per match)
- Top goalscorer: Mattias Adelstam, Ängelholm (19); Marcus Ekenberg, Mjällby (19)
- Average attendance: 1,880

The 2009 Superettan was part of the 2009 Swedish football season, and the tenth season of Superettan, Sweden's second-tier football division in its current format. A total of 16 teams contested the league.. The season began on 11 April 2009 and ended on 24 October 2009.

The top 2 teams qualified directly for promotion to Allsvenskan, the third played a play-off against the fourteenth from Allsvenskan to decide who qualified to play in Allsvenskan 2010. The bottom 2 teams qualified directly for relegation to Division 1, the thirteenth and the fourteenth played a play-off against the numbers two from Division 1 Södra and Division 1 Norra to decide who qualified to play in Superettan 2010.

== Participating teams ==
Location of the Superettan 2009 teams

Team	Location	Manager	Venue	Capacity	Last season
Assyriska	Södertälje	(Sweden) Robert Johansson	Södertälje Fotbollsarena	6,700	4th
Falkenberg	Falkenberg	(Sweden) Thomas Askebrand	Falkenbergs IP	4,000	7th
Jönköpings Södra	Jönköping	(Sweden) Olle Nordin (Sweden) Andreas Jankevics	Stadsparksvallen	5,200	14th
Landskrona	Landskrona	(Sweden) Anders Linderoth	Landskrona IP	12,000	11th
Ljungskile	Ljungskile	(Sweden) Bo Wålemark	Starke Arvid Arena	6,000	14th (Allsvenskan 2008)
Mjällby	Mjällby	(Sweden) Peter Swärdh	Strandvallen	7,500	8th
Norrköping	Norrköping	(Sweden) Göran Bergort	Idrottsparken	19,000	16th (Allsvenskan 2008)
Qviding	Gothenburg	(Sweden) Lars Borgström	Valhalla IP	4,000	10th
Sirius	Uppsala	(Sweden) Jens T. Andersson	Studenternas IP	7,600	12th
GIF Sundsvall	Sundsvall	(Sweden) Sören Åkeby	Norrporten Arena	7,700	15th (Allsvenskan 2008)
Syrianska	Södertälje	(Sweden) Özcan Melkemichel	Södertälje Fotbollsarena	6,700	1st (D1 Norra)
Trollhättan	Trollhättan	(Sweden) Lars-Olof Mattsson	Edsborgs IP	5,100	1st (D1 Södra)
Vasalund	Solna	(Sweden) Peter Lenell	Skytteholms IP	4,000	2nd (D1 Norra)
Väsby	Upplands Väsby	(Sweden) Thomas Lagerlöf	Vilundavallen	4,000	9th
Åtvidaberg	Åtvidaberg	(Sweden) Daniel Wiklund	Kopparvallen	7,200	6th
Ängelholm	Ängelholm	(Sweden) Roar Hansen	Ängelholms IP	5,000	5th

== League table ==
Pos	Team	Pld	W	D	L	GF	GA	GD	Pts	Promotion, qualification or relegation
1	Mjällby AIF (C, P)	30	19	8	3	60	19	+41	65	Promotion to Allsvenskan
2	Åtvidabergs FF (P)	30	17	6	7	53	36	+17	57	Promotion to Allsvenskan
3	Assyriska FF	30	15	6	9	46	38	+8	51	Qualification to Promotion playoffs
4	Syrianska FC	30	15	5	10	50	38	+12	50	
5	GIF Sundsvall	30	13	8	9	54	48	+6	47	
6	Falkenbergs FF	30	14	3	13	44	41	+3	45	
7	Ängelholms FF	30	13	5	12	43	45	−2	44	
8	Landskrona BoIS	30	12	4	14	51	46	+5	40	
9	Ljungskile SK	30	11	7	12	48	43	+5	40	
10	Jönköpings Södra IF	30	10	6	14	46	54	−8	36	
11	IFK Norrköping	30	8	11	11	45	44	+1	35	
12	FC Väsby United	30	8	9	13	28	41	−13	33	
13	FC Trollhättan (O)	30	8	8	14	30	46	−16	32	Qualification to Relegation playoffs
14	Qviding FIF (R)	30	7	10	13	31	45	−14	31	Qualification to Relegation playoffs
15	IK Sirius (R)	30	8	7	15	37	53	−16	31	Relegation to Division 1
16	Vasalunds IF (R)	30	8	5	17	35	64	−29	29	Relegation to Division 1

Source: svenskfotboll.se (in Swedish)
Rules for classification: 1) points; 2) goal difference; 3) number of goals scored.
(C) Champions; (O) Play-off winners; (P) Promoted; (R) Relegated

== Results ==
Home \ Away	AFF	FFF	JSIF	LAN	LSK	MAIF	IFKN	QFIF	IKS	GIFS	SFC	FCT	VIF	VU	ÅFF	ÄFF
Assyriska FF		0–2	0–1	4–1	2–1	1–2	3–0	1–1	2–1	4–2	0–1	0–0	2–1	4–0	2–1	2–1
Falkenbergs FF	0–2		1–0	2–1	1–0	1–3	1–1	2–0	3–1	2–3	0–1	7–0	5–0	0–2	0–1	0–4
Jönköpings Södra IF	3–3	4–1		0–2	3–5	0–3	1–2	1–0	1–5	4–6	1–4	2–0	3–1	0–2	2–2	6–1
Landskrona BoIS	1–3	1–3	2–4		0–3	0–1	2–3	2–2	3–0	5–2	2–0	3–1	5–0	2–0	0–1	0–1
Ljungskile SK	1–1	3–0	0–1	2–1		0–4	2–2	2–0	2–0	2–2	0–2	0–1	1–1	4–1	2–1	3–0
Mjällby AIF	4–0	2–1	0–0	0–0	2–1		1–0	0–1	4–0	4–2	1–1	2–0	6–0	1–1	6–1	2–2
IFK Norrköping	5–1	5–1	1–0	2–4	1–1	0–1		1–1	3–0	2–2	1–2	0–0	3–4	0–0	2–2	3–0
Qviding FIF	0–3	2–3	3–2	2–1	2–3	0–2	3–0		0–0	1–1	1–0	1–3	1–1	0–0	2–0	3–1
IK Sirius	5–0	0–0	0–0	0–3	2–2	1–4	1–1	2–3		1–0	3–1	3–0	2–0	2–1	1–1	0–2
GIF Sundsvall	2–0	2–1	4–1	0–1	0–3	1–1	3–1	1–1	2–0		3–2	0–0	2–0	1–2	1–2	4–1
Syrianska FC	0–1	0–0	0–1	1–2	4–2	1–2	2–1	3–1	1–0	1–2		2–1	1–1	4–0	2–2	3–1
FC Trollhättan	0–2	0–1	1–0	1–1	1–1	0–1	0–0	0–0	5–2	1–1	3–2		3–1	1–0	0–1	1–2
Vasalunds IF	0–0	0–1	1–2	1–3	1–0	2–1	4–2	2–0	3–4	1–1	1–2	3–1		2–0	0–1	2–1
FC Väsby United	0–2	1–2	0–0	2–0	2–1	0–0	0–0	1–1	0–0	1–2	2–2	2–0	5–2		0–2	3–2
Åtvidabergs FF	1–0	0–3	2–2	4–2	2–0	2–0	0–2	4–0	4–1	3–1	1–2	3–2	5–0	2–0		1–1
Ängelholms FF	1–1	2–0	2–1	1–1	3–1	0–0	2–1	1–0	2–0	0–1	3–1	3–4	1–0	2–0	0–1	

Source: svenskfotboll.se (in Swedish)
Legend: Blue = home team win; Yellow = draw; Red = away team win.

== Relegation play-offs ==
Trollhättan and Qviding, who were the 13th and 14th teams in Superettan 2009 faced with Brage and Skövde, who were runners-up of Division 1.

Team 1	Agg.	Team 2	1st leg	2nd leg
Skövde	4–7	Trollhättan	1–2	3–5
Brage	3–1	Qviding	2–1	1–0

Trollhättan won the play-out by 7-4 aggregate and remained in Superettan for 2010 season. Skövde, Division 1 Södra runner-up, didn't promote.

Brage, Division 1 Norra runner-up, won the play-out by 3-1 aggregate and promoted to Superettan for 2010 season. Qviding relegated to Division 1 Norra.

== Season statistics ==
=== Top scorers ===
Rank	Player	Club	Goals
1	(Sweden) Marcus Ekenberg	Mjällby	19
1	(Sweden) Mattias Adelstam	Ängelholm	19
3	(Sweden) Fredrik Olsson	Landskrona BoIS	14
3	(Sweden) Stefan Rodevåg	Falkenberg	14
3	(Sweden) Pär Cederqvist	Landskrona BoIS	14
6	(Sweden) Johan Patriksson	Ljungskile SK	13
6	(Ghana) Michael Mensah	Syrianska	13
6	(Sweden) Erton Fejzullahu	Mjällby	13
9	(Sweden) Niklas Löfgren	Ljungskile	12
9	(Nigeria) Kennedy Igboananike	Vasalund	12
11	2 players		10
13	3 players		9
16	6 players		8
22	7 players		7
29	9 players		6
38	16 players		5

=== Top goalkeepers ===
(Minimum of 10 games played)

Rank	Goalkeeper	Club	GP	GA	SV%	ShO
1	(Sweden) Mattias Asper	Mjällby	30	19	87	15
2	(Sweden) Niklas Westberg	Väsby United	23	30	77	8
2	(Sweden) Tommi Vaiho	Vasalund	19	30	77	3
4	(Bosnia and Herzegovina) Stojan Lukic	Falkenberg	29	36	76	11
4	(Sweden) Petter Augustsson	Ängelholm	11	16	76	5
4	(Albania) Nuredin Bakiu	IFK Norrköping	18	23	76	7
7	(Sweden) Peter Karlsson	Landskrona BoIS	27	39	75	8
8	(Sweden) Henrik Gustavsson	Åtvidaberg	30	36	74	12
8	(Sweden) Tobias Wennergren	FC Trollhättan	28	44	74	7
8	(Sweden) Oscar Berglund	Assyriska	24	30	74	7
8	(Sweden) Christian Frealdsson	Syrianska	21	23	74	6
8	(Sweden) Mikael Axelsson	Jönköpings Södra	23	38	74	7

== Attendances ==
Team	Stadium	Capacity	Total	Average	Games	% of Capacity
Assyriska	Södertälje Fotbollsarena	6,700	42,014	2,801	15	42%
Falkenberg	Falkenbergs IP	4,000	20,494	1,366	15	34%
Jönköpings Södra	Stadsparksvallen	5,200	37,063	2,471	15	48%
Landskrona	Landskrona IP	12,000	34,601	2,307	15	19%
Ljungskile	Starke Arvid Arena	6,000	14,529	969	15	16%
Mjällby	Strandvallen	7,500	36,668	2,445	15	33%
Norrköping	Idrottsparken	19,000	64,593	4,306	15	23%
Qviding	Valhalla IP	4,000	6,926	462	15	12%
Sirius	Studenternas IP	7,600	22,476	1,498	15	20%
GIF Sundsvall	Norrporten Arena	7,700	47,327	3,155	15	41%
Syrianska	Södertälje Fotbollsarena	6,700	34,288	2,286	15	34%
Trollhättan	Edsborgs IP	5,100	23,742	1,583	15	31%
Vasalund	Skytteholms IP	4,000	10,809	721	15	18%
Väsby	Vilundavallen	4,000	6,088	406	15	10%
Åtvidaberg	Kopparvallen	7,200	34,538	2,303	15	32%
Ängelholm	Ängelholms IP	5,000	15,142	1,009	15	20%

Total	Games	Average
451,298	240	1,880

Source: svenskfotboll.se (in Swedish)
