= Isak Bråholm =

Swedish footballer

Personal information
- Full name: Isak Carl Axel Yong Kun Bråholm
- Date of birth: 24 September 2000 (age 26)
- Position: Midfielder

Team information
- Current team: Enköpings SK FK
- Number: 40

Youth career
- Unik FK
- –2018: IK Sirius

Senior career*
Years	Team	Apps	(Gls)
2019–2021	IK Sirius	9	(0)
2020	→ IFK Luleå (loan)	21	(2)
2021	→ Sandviken (loan)	27	(1)
2022	Sandviken	28	(1)
2023	Oskarshamns AIK	29	(1)
2024	Assyriska FF	10	(0)
2024	Täby FK	15	(1)
2025-	Enköpings SK FK	51	(9)
- * Club domestic league appearances and goals as of 16 November 2026

Isak Carl Axel Yong Kun Bråholm (born 24 September 2000) is a Swedish football midfielder who plays for Enköpings SK FK.

== Club career ==
On 23 February 2022, Bråholm returned to Sandviken on a permanent basis after playing for the club in 2021 on loan. A year later, in February 2023, Bråholm joined fellow league club Oskarshamns AIK.
