= 2001 Superettan =

Superettan
- Season: 2001
- Champions: Kalmar FF
- Promoted: Kalmar FF; Landskrona BoIS
- Relegated: GAIS; Umeå FC; Motala
- Matches played: 240

The 2001 Superettan was part of the 2001 Swedish football season, and the second season of Superettan, Sweden's second-tier football division in its current format. A total of 16 teams contested the league.

== Overview ==
It was contested by 16 teams, and Kalmar FF won the championship.

== League table ==
Pos	Team	Pld	W	D	L	GF	GA	GD	Pts	Promotion, qualification or relegation
1	Kalmar FF (C, P)	30	21	6	3	68	19	+49	69	Promotion to Allsvenskan
2	Landskrona BoIS (P)	30	20	5	5	60	26	+34	65	Promotion to Allsvenskan
3	Mjällby AIF	30	17	7	6	57	33	+24	58	Qualification to Promotion playoffs
4	Gefle IF	30	17	6	7	51	32	+19	57	
5	Café Opera United	30	12	10	8	55	52	+3	46	
6	Västerås SK	30	12	5	13	46	51	−5	41	
7	IF Sylvia	30	11	6	13	56	53	+3	39	
8	Enköpings SK	30	10	9	11	40	41	−1	39	
9	Västra Frölunda	30	9	10	11	42	42	0	37	
10	IK Brage	30	11	4	15	46	56	−10	37	
11	IFK Malmö	30	8	12	10	39	49	−10	36	
12	Östers IF	30	10	5	15	41	55	−14	35	
13	Assyriska FF	30	8	9	13	32	35	−3	33	
14	GAIS (R)	30	8	9	13	31	47	−16	33	Relegation to Division 2
15	Umeå FC (R)	30	6	3	21	36	63	−27	21	Relegation to Division 2
16	Motala AIF (R)	30	3	8	19	30	76	−46	17	Relegation to Division 2

Source: svenskfotboll.se (in Swedish)
Rules for classification: 1) points; 2) goal difference; 3) number of goals scored.
(C) Champions; (P) Promoted; (R) Relegated

== Season statistics ==
=== Top scorers ===
Rank	Player	Club	Goals
1	(Sweden) Daniel Nannskog	Landskrona BoIS	21
2	(Sweden) Niclas Fredriksson	IF Sylvia	20
3	(Sweden) Pelle Andersson	IF Sylvia	18
4	(Sweden) Markus Ringberg	Mjällby AIF	17
5	(Sweden) Fredrik Gärdeman	Kalmar FF	14
6	(Sweden) Lasse Nilsson	IK Brage	13
6	(Sweden) Dorde Uzelac	Västra Frölunda IF	13
8	(Sweden) Ludwig Ernstsson	Östers IF	12
9	(Sweden) Lasse Johansson	Kalmar FF	11
9	(Sweden) Göran Marklund	Café Opera/Djursholm	11
9	(Sweden) Mathias Woxlin	Gefle IF	11
