= Andreas Lindberg =

Andreas Lindberg may refer to:

- Andreas Lindberg (footballer) (born 1980), Swedish footballer
- Andreas Lindberg (football manager) (born c. 1978), Swedish football manager
