= Peter Antoine =

German football manager (1944–2023)

Personal information
- Date of birth: 25 September 1944
- Place of birth: Essen, Germany
- Date of death: 12 October 2023 (aged 79)
- Place of death: Sweden

Managerial career
- Years: Team
- 1991–1993: Mjällby AIF
- 1993: Jonsereds IF
- 1994–1996: Mjällby AIF
- 1998: Kalmar AIK
- 1999–2001: Assyriska FF
- 2002: FK Karlskrona

Peter Antoine (25 September 1944 – 12 October 2023) was a German football manager and player who spent most of his career in Sweden.

== Career ==
Antoine was born in Essen, Germany. He played for 1860 Munich, Bayer Leverkusen and Bayern Munich. He moved to Sweden early in his adult life, remaining there until his death, and managed several Swedish clubs. He later worked as a commentator at TV4.

== Personal life and death ==
Antoine was a German citizen. He lived in Hällevik. In 2015 he fell and broke his leg. After suffering bone rot, he had to have his right leg amputated. He died from pneumonia on 12 October 2023, at the age of 79.
