= 2023 Svenska Cupen final =

Swedish domestic football cup final

2023 Svenska Cupen Final
- Event: 2022–23 Svenska Cupen
BK Häcken	Mjällby AIF
4	1
- Date: 18 May 2023
- Venue: Strandvallen, Hällevik

The 2023 Svenska Cupen Final was played on 18 May 2023 between Mjällby AIF and BK Häcken at Strandvallen, Hällevik, the home pitch for Mjällby AIF. The final was the culmination of the 2022–23 Svenska Cupen, the 66th season of the Svenska Cupen. Häcken defeated Mjällby 4–1.

BK Häcken appeared in its 5th Svenska Cupen final, having won the title twice before in 2015-16 and 2018-19. Mjällby AIF made its first ever appearance in the Svenska Cupen final. The winner of the final will themselves a place in the second qualifying round of the 2023–24 UEFA Europa Conference League.

== Teams ==
Team	Previous finals appearances (bold indicates winners)
BK Häcken	4 (1989–90, **2015–16**, **2018–19**, 2020–21 )
Mjällby AIF	0

== Venue ==
Since 2014–15, Svenska Cupen finals have been held in the home ground of the higher-seeded team of the tournament in an effort to bolster attendance and fan support. Strandvallen, home pitch of Mjällby AIF, will host its first Svenska Cupen final.

== Background ==
Häcken will compete in its fourth-ever final, having won its previous titles in 2015–16, beating Malmö FF in a penalty shootout, and in 2018-19, taking down AFC Eskilstuna. MJällby will its first-ever appearance in a Svenska Cupen final in its 83-year history.

== Route to the final ==
Note: In all results below, the score of the finalist is given first (H: home; A: away).

BK Häcken		Round	Mjällby AIF	
Opponent	Result		Opponent	Result
Bye		First round	Bye	
Älmhults IF (5)	1–2 (A)	Second round	Hässleholms IF (4)	0–2 (A)
Jönköpings Södra IF (2)	5–0 (H)	Group Stage	Dalkurd FF (3)	1–0 (H)
FC Trollhättan (4)	6–1 (A)	Group Stage	Oskarshamns AIK (4)	1–2 (A)
Halmstads BK (1)	2–1 (H)	Group Stage	IK Sirius (1)	3–2 (H)
IFK Norrköping (1)	3–0 (H)	Quarterfinals	Kalmar FF (1)	2–1 (H) (a.e.t.)
Djurgårdens IF (1)	3–0 (H)	Semifinals	Hammarby (1)	1–0 (A)
