= Amar Diagne =

Danish footballer (born 2006)

Personal information
- Full name: Mohamed Amar Diddo Diagne
- Date of birth: 2 January 2006 (age 20)
- Place of birth: Søborg, Denmark
- Position: Left winger

Team information
- Current team: Assyriska FF

Youth career
- GVI
- Copenhagen
- 2024–: AaB

Senior career*
Years	Team	Apps	(Gls)
2024–2026	AaB	6	(0)
2026–	Assyriska FF	5	(1)
- * Club domestic league appearances and goals as of 16 November 2026

Mohamed Amar Diddo Diagne (born 2 January 2006) is a Danish professional footballer who plays as a left winger for Swedish club Assyriska FF.

== Club career ==
=== Youth years ===
Diagne started his football career in GVI, before later moving to F.C. Copenhagen's academy. Diagne was described as a big talent in his younger years, and he also played a reserve team match for Copenhagen at the age of 15 in October 2021. However, he did not manage to establish himself in the club's U-19 squad, which is why he left Copenhagen.

=== AaB ===
In the fall of 2023 Diagne trained with AaB and in January 2024 the club's sporting director Ole Jan Kappmeier confirmed that they had signed him. Already in the spring, Diagne was twice part of AaB's match squad in the Danish 1st Division and on April 17, 2024, after just four matches in the club's U-19 squad, the club confirmed that they had extended with Diagne until June 2028. On June 2, 2024, Diagne made his official debut for AaB when he replaced Younes Bakiz in the 80th minute and managed to make an assist for Melker Widell's 4–1 score.

In July 2024, 18-year-old Diagne was permanently promoted to the first team squad. On August 18, 2024, Diagne made his debut in the Danish Superliga in a match against Brøndby IF.

=== Assyriska FF ===
On 15 September 2026, he signed a contract with Swedish side Assyriska FF.
