= 2003 Allsvenskan =

79th season of Allsvenskan

Allsvenskan
- Season: 2003
- Champions: Djurgårdens IF
- Relegated: Östers IF; Enköpings SK
- Champions League: Djurgårdens IF
- UEFA Cup: Hammarby IF
- Matches: 182
- Goals: 518 (2.85 per match)
- Top goalscorer: Niklas Skoog, Malmö FF (22)
- Average attendance: 10,208

Allsvenskan 2003, part of the 2003 Swedish football season, was the 79th Allsvenskan season played. The first match was played 5 April 2003 and the last match was played 26 October 2003. Djurgårdens IF won the league ahead of runners-up Hammarby IF, while Östers IF and Enköpings SK were relegated.

== Participating clubs ==
Location of the 2003 Allsvenskan teams

Club	Last season	First season in league	First season of current spell
AIK	5th	1924–25	1981
Djurgårdens IF	1st	1927–28	2001
Enköpings SK	2nd (Superettan)	2003	2003
IF Elfsborg	10th	1926–27	1997
IFK Göteborg	12th	1924–25	1977
Halmstads BK	6th	1933–34	1993
Hammarby IF	9th	1924–25	1998
Helsingborgs IF	4th	1924–25	1993
Landskrona BoIS	11th	1924–25	2002
Malmö FF	2nd	1931–32	2001
GIF Sundsvall	8th	1965	2000
Örebro SK	7th	1946–47	1989
Örgryte IS	3rd	1924–25	1995
Östers IF	1st (Superettan)	1968	2003

== League table ==
Pos	Team	Pld	W	D	L	GF	GA	GD	Pts	Qualification or relegation
1	Djurgårdens IF (C)	26	19	1	6	62	26	+36	58	Qualification to Champions League second qualifying round
2	Hammarby IF	26	15	6	5	50	30	+20	51	Qualification to UEFA Cup second qualifying round
3	Malmö FF	26	14	6	6	50	23	+27	48	Qualification to Intertoto Cup first round
4	Örgryte IS	26	14	3	9	42	40	+2	45	
5	AIK	26	11	6	9	39	34	+5	39	
6	Helsingborgs IF	26	11	5	10	35	36	−1	38	
7	IFK Göteborg	26	10	7	9	37	28	+9	37	
8	Örebro SK	26	10	7	9	29	33	−4	37	
9	Halmstads BK	26	11	3	12	41	37	+4	36	
10	IF Elfsborg	26	9	7	10	29	34	−5	34	Qualification to UEFA Cup second qualifying round (Note: Elfsborg qualified for the UEFA Cup as Svenska Cupen champions 2003.)
11	Landskrona BoIS	26	8	8	10	26	39	−13	32	
12	GIF Sundsvall (O)	26	3	10	13	25	43	−18	19	Qualification to Relegation play-offs
13	Östers IF (Note: Sweden was among the best three associations in the UEFA Fair Play ranking and thus received an additional spot in the first qualifying round of the Europa League, Öster received the qualifying spot for their ranking in Allsvenskans Fair Play ranking.) (R)	26	3	8	15	31	56	−25	17	UEFA Cup qualifying and relegation to Superettan
14	Enköpings SK (R)	26	3	5	18	22	59	−37	14	Relegation to Superettan

Source: svenskfotboll.se (in Swedish)
Rules for classification: 1) points; 2) goal difference; 3) number of goals scored.
(C) Champions; (O) Play-off winners; (R) Relegated

== Results ==
Home \ Away	AIK	DIF	ESK	IFE	IFKG	HBK	HAM	HEL	LBoIS	MFF	GIFS	ÖSK	ÖIS	ÖIF
AIK		3–3	3–0	4–0	0–2	4–2	1–3	0–2	3–0	2–0	2–1	0–0	3–0	1–1
Djurgårdens IF	2–1		3–2	5–0	3–1	2–0	3–0	1–0	3–0	0–2	2–0	3–0	0–3	5–2
Enköpings SK	0–2	0–4		1–1	0–1	0–4	1–2	0–2	1–1	0–1	3–1	2–0	1–3	0–2
IF Elfsborg	2–0	0–2	1–1		2–1	2–1	0–2	0–0	3–0	1–2	2–2	1–0	3–1	4–0
IFK Göteborg	0–2	1–0	3–0	0–1		0–0	0–1	1–2	1–1	3–0	1–1	4–0	5–2	1–0
Halmstads BK	1–1	2–3	3–2	1–1	1–0		3–1	2–4	3–0	0–4	2–0	2–3	2–1	3–0
Hammarby IF	1–1	2–3	7–0	3–0	1–1	1–0		2–0	0–1	2–1	5–0	1–1	3–0	2–2
Helsingborgs IF	5–1	2–1	0–4	1–0	0–2	0–1	0–2		2–2	0–0	2–1	0–0	1–2	0–3
Landskrona BoIS	1–2	1–2	3–1	2–1	2–1	1–0	0–1	0–3		1–0	3–2	0–0	1–1	2–0
Malmö FF	3–0	2–1	4–0	0–0	1–3	2–1	6–0	5–0	2–2		2–2	2–0	1–1	3–2
GIF Sundsvall	2–1	1–4	0–0	1–1	2–2	2–1	0–0	0–1	3–1	1–1		0–1	0–1	1–1
Örebro SK	0–0	1–0	4–2	2–1	2–2	0–2	2–3	2–1	0–0	1–0	2–1		1–2	5–1
Örgryte IS	3–1	0–3	3–0	1–0	4–1	3–1	0–1	1–4	1–1	0–4	1–0	2–0		4–2
Östers IF	0–1	0–4	1–1	1–2	0–0	0–3	4–4	3–3	3–0	0–2	1–1	1–2	1–2	

Source: Swedish Football Association (in Swedish)
Legend: Blue = home team win; Yellow = draw; Red = away team win.

== Relegation play-offs ==
30 October 2003
19:00

BK Häcken	1–2	GIF Sundsvall
Uusimäki 64'		Svenning 19' (pen.); Lundqvist 47'

Rambergsvallen, Gothenburg
Attendance: 2,317
Referee: Martin Hansson (Holmsjö)

2 November 2003
14:00

GIF Sundsvall	0–1	BK Häcken
		Skiljo 46'

Idrottsparken, Sundsvall
Attendance: 4,307
Referee: Peter Fröjdfeldt (Eskilstuna)

2–2 on aggregate. GIF Sundsvall won on away goals.

== Season statistics ==
=== Top scorers ===
Rank	Player	Club	Goals
1	(Sweden) Niklas Skoog	Malmö FF	22
2	(Brazil) Paulinho Guará	Örgryte IS	14
2	(Sweden) Kim Källström	Djurgårdens IF	14
4	(Sweden) Gustaf Andersson	Helsingborgs IF	12
4	(Sweden) Kennedy Bakircioglü	Hammarby IF	12
4	(Sweden) Andreas Johansson	Djurgårdens IF	12
7	(Brazil) Afonso Alves	Örgryte IS	10
7	(Sweden) Mikael Andersson	Hammarby IF	10
7	(Netherlands) Geert den Ouden	Djurgårdens IF	10
7	(Poland) Igor Sypniewski	Halmstads BK	10

=== Attendances ===
	Club	Home average	Away average	Home high
1	Malmö FF	18,716	10,367	27,477
2	AIK	17,302	12,489	35,197
3	Djurgårdens IF	16,083	16,852	34,267
4	Hammarby IF	14,025	12,604	35,611
5	IFK Göteborg	11,586	13,241	40,382
6	Helsingborgs IF	10,235	9,567	15,460
7	Örgryte IS	8,654	10,337	37,026
8	IF Elfsborg	7,733	8,292	11,205
9	Örebro SK	7,508	8,054	11,739
10	Halmstads BK	7,506	8,158	14,435
11	Östers IF	7,025	9,259	13,215
12	Landskrona BoIS	6,436	8,716	11,375
13	GIF Sundsvall	5,675	7,418	7,675
14	Enköpings SK	4,451	7,582	9,102
—	Total	10,210	—	40,382
