= Geert den Ouden =

Dutch footballer

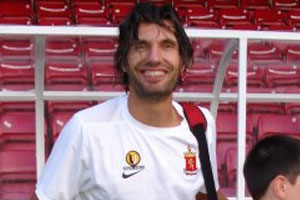

Personal information
- Full name: Gijsbertus Cornelis den Ouden
- Date of birth: 24 July 1976 (age 50)
- Place of birth: Delft, Netherlands
- Height: 6 ft 4 in (1.93 m)
- Position: Striker

Youth career
- NOC
- Smitshoek

Senior career*
Years	Team	Apps	(Gls)
1998–2001	Excelsior	94	(33)
2001–2003	RBC	62	(29)
2003–2004	Djurgården	23	(13)
2004–2006	ADO Den Haag	60	(17)
2006–2007	Willem II	17	(1)
2007–2008	Excelsior	34	(12)
2008–2009	De Graafschap	22	(2)
2009	Valletta	8	(1)
2010	Dayton Dutch Lions	10	(8)
Total		330	(116)
- * Club domestic league appearances and goals as of 28 July 2010

Gijsbertus Cornelis "Geert" den Ouden (born 24 July 1976) is a Dutch former professional footballer who played as a striker. While at Djurgårdens IF, he became the first-ever Dutchman to play in Allsvenskan and helped the team win the 2003 Allsvenskan and 2004 Svenska Cupen titles.

== Career ==
=== Early career ===
Den Ouden has extensive experience playing in his native Netherlands, having made over 150 appearances for clubs such as SBV Excelsior and RBC Roosendaal since turning professional in 1998.

=== Djurgårdens IF ===
Den Ouden was signed by Swedish club Djurgården in 2003, and played two seasons with the club, winning the Allsvenskan in 2003 and the Svenska Cupen in 2004. He was the first-ever Dutchman to play in Allsvenskan.

=== Return to the Netherlands ===
He subsequently played for ADO Den Haag, Willem II, a second stint with Excelsior Rotterdam, and De Graafschap.

=== Valletta ===
Den Ouden made his debut for Valletta in the first qualifying round of the Europa League against Icelandic side Keflavik, scoring a goal in the 72nd minute, to round the match to a 3–0 win for the Maltese side. His Maltese Premier League debut arrived in the first league match of the season, scoring the opener in a 3–1 win over Birkirkara.

However, after half a year contract he left Valletta due to a disagreement with the coach. They agreed that his contract would be terminated. This was finalised on 15 November 2009.

=== Dayton Dutch Lions ===
In December 2009 den Ouden was approached by fellow Dutch professional Erik Tammer, who asked him to join the fledgling Dayton Dutch Lions team, which made its debut in the USL Premier Development League in 2010. Den Ouden agreed; he played his first game for the team on 15 May 2010, a 3-0 victory over the Cleveland Internationals in which he scored his team's third goal.

== Honors ==
Djurgårdens IF

- Allsvenskan: 2003
- Svenska Cupen: 2004
