= Niclas Fredriksson =

Swedish footballer (born 1973)

Niclas Fredriksson (born 24 August 1973) is a Swedish former footballer who played as a midfielder. He spent two seasons with IFK Norrköping but did not receive an extension on his contract. He later played for IF Sylvia, another Norrköping-based club. He works with youth players nowadays.
