= 2004 Superettan =

Superettan
- Season: 2004
- Champions: Häcken
- Promoted: Häcken; Gefle; Assyriska FF
- Relegated: Enköping; Brage; Friska Viljor
- Matches played: 240

The 2004 Superettan was part of the 2004 Swedish football season, and the fifth season of Superettan, Sweden's second-tier football division in its current format. A total of 16 teams contested the league.

== Overview ==
It was contested by 16 teams, and BK Häcken won the championship.

== League table ==
Pos	Team	Pld	W	D	L	GF	GA	GD	Pts	Promotion, qualification or relegation
1	BK Häcken (C, P)	30	19	8	3	60	31	+29	65	Promotion to Allsvenskan
2	Gefle IF (P)	30	17	7	6	50	28	+22	58	Promotion to Allsvenskan
3	Assyriska FF (P)	30	17	3	10	48	39	+9	54	Qualification to Promotion playoffs (Note: Assyriska FF lost the promotion play-offs against Örgryte but were promoted nonetheless since Örebro were relegated due to their Allsvenskan licence being revoked for financial reasons.)
4	IFK Norrköping	30	14	8	8	58	37	+21	50	
5	Östers IF	30	14	8	8	51	36	+15	50	
6	GAIS	30	13	10	7	45	40	+5	49	
7	Åtvidabergs FF	30	14	6	10	55	47	+8	48	
8	Västerås SK	30	12	8	10	47	47	0	44	
9	Café Opera United	30	10	10	10	45	39	+6	40	
10	IF Brommapojkarna	30	9	9	12	43	42	+1	36	
11	Västra Frölunda	30	10	6	14	40	48	−8	36	
12	Falkenbergs FF	30	8	5	17	30	52	−22	29	
13	Boden	30	5	13	12	32	40	−8	28	
14	Enköpings SK (R)	30	5	11	14	31	44	−13	26	Relegation to Division 2
15	IK Brage (R)	30	5	10	15	41	62	−21	25	Relegation to Division 2
16	Friska Viljor (R)	30	6	2	22	30	74	−44	20	Relegation to Division 2

Source: svenskfotboll.se (in Swedish)
Rules for classification: 1) points; 2) goal difference; 3) number of goals scored.
(C) Champions; (P) Promoted; (R) Relegated

== Season statistics ==
=== Top scorers ===
Rank	Player	Club	Goals
1	(Sweden) Stefan Bärlin	Västerås SK	23
2	(Liberia) Dioh Williams	BK Häcken	16
3	(Sweden) Pontus Karlsson	Åtvidabergs FF	14
3	(Sierra Leone) Kabba Samura	Assyriska	14
3	(Sweden) Andreas Alm	IFK Norrköping	14
6	(Sweden) Joakim Hagernäs	Café Opera/Djursholm	13
6	(Sweden) Andreas Haddad	Assyriska	13
6	(Sweden) Daniel Johansson	Friska Viljor FC	13
9	(Sweden) Daniel Westlin	Gefle IF	12
9	(Sweden) Pär Cederqvist	Östers IF	12
9	(Sweden) Kristian Bergström	Åtvidabergs FF	12

=== Top goalkeepers ===
(Minimum of 10 games played)

Rank	Goalkeeper	Club	GP	GA	SV%	ShO
1	(Sweden) Mattias Hugosson	Gefle IF	25	17	85	14
1	(Sweden) Daniel Örlund	Café Opera/Djursholm	25	25	85	7
3	(Sweden) Claes Green	Östers IF	15	18	78	5
4	(Sweden) David Wikström	Västerås SK	26	41	77	6
5	(Sweden) Lee Baxter	Bodens BK	17	21	76	4
5	(Sweden) Tommy Karlsson	Falkenbergs FF	30	52	76	7
5	(Sweden) Christoffer Källqvist	BK Häcken	29	30	76	10
5	(Sweden) Peter Kennfors	Östers IF	14	15	76	5
5	(Sweden) Henrik Gustavsson	Åtvidabergs FF	28	43	77	4
10	(Sweden) Andreas Lindberg	IFK Norrköping	30	37	75	11
