= Friska Viljor FC =

Swedish football club

- Full name: Friska Viljor Fotboll Club
- Nicknames: Gulsvart (Yellow-Black); Viljorna (The Wills)
- Founded: 1994
- Ground: Skyttis IP; Örnsköldsvik; Sweden
- Chairman: Per-Olof Östman
- Head coach: Pero Kapcevic
- League: Ettan Norra
- 2024: Ettan Norra, 16th of 16 (relegated)
Home colours

Friska Viljor FC is a Swedish football club located in Örnsköldsvik in Örnsköldsvik Municipality, Västernorrland County.

== Background ==
The club was formed in February 1994 from the football section of the multi-sport club IF Friska Viljor, a club whose greatest achievement had been to reach the semifinal of the 1948 Svenska Cupen. From 1995 to 1998, the new club progressed through the league system from Division 6 to Division 2.

In 2003, the club won Division 2 Norrland and then participated in the promotion play-offs: they won 4–3 away to Väsby IK FK and then lost 2–3 at home, and were promoted to the Superettan on away goals. Second-tier football in the Superettan in 2004 proved a disappointment as Friska Viljor finished in last place and were relegated. In subsequent years Friska Viljor FC participated in the middle divisions of the Swedish football league system, winning the Division 3 promotion play-off to return to Division 2 Norrland (Swedish football's fourth tier) in 2015.

The club currently plays in Division 1 Norra (the third tier of Swedish football). They play their home matches at Skyttis IP in Örnsköldsvik. Since 2004, the club has used an artificial turf surface.

Friska Viljor FC are affiliated to the Ångermanlands Fotbollförbund.

== Season to season ==
Season	Level	Division	Section	Position	Movements
1994	Tier 7	Division 6	Ångermanland	3rd	
1995	Tier 7	Division 6	Ångermanland	1st	Promoted
1996	Tier 6	Division 5	Ångermanland	1st	Promoted
1997	Tier 5	Division 4	Ångermanland	1st	Promoted
1998	Tier 4	Division 3	Mellersta Norrland	1st	Promoted
1999	Tier 3	Division 2	Norrland	6th	
2000	Tier 3	Division 2	Norrland	4th	
2001	Tier 3	Division 2	Norrland	7th	
2002	Tier 3	Division 2	Norrland	8th	
2003	Tier 3	Division 2	Norrland	1st	Promotion play-offs – Promoted
2004	Tier 2	Superettan		16th	Relegated
2005	Tier 3	Division 2	Norrland	8th	
2006*	Tier 4	Division 2	Norrland	7th	
2007	Tier 4	Division 2	Norrland	3rd	
2008	Tier 4	Division 2	Norrland	6th	
2009	Tier 4	Division 2	Norrland	11th	Relegated
2010	Tier 5	Division 3	Mellersta Norrland	5th	
2011	Tier 5	Division 3	Mellersta Norrland	3rd	
2012	Tier 5	Division 3	Mellersta Norrland	2nd	Promotion play-off
2013	Tier 5	Division 3	Mellersta Norrland	10th	Relegation play-off
2014	Tier 5	Division 3	Mellersta Norrland	2nd	Promotion play-off
2015	Tier 5	Division 3	Mellersta Norrland	2nd	Promoted
2016	Tier 4	Division 2	Norrland	13th	Relegated
2017	Tier 5	Division 3	Mellersta Norrland	2nd	Promotion play-off - Promoted
2018	Tier 4	Division 2	Norrland	7th	
2019	Tier 4	Division 2	Norrland	3rd	
2020	Tier 4	Division 2	Norrland	4th	

* League restructuring in 2006 resulted in a new division being created at Tier 3 and subsequent divisions dropping a level.

== Attendances ==
In recent seasons Friska Viljor FC have had the following average attendances:

Season	Average attendance	Division/section	Level
2005	397	Div 2 Norrland	Tier 3
2006	188	Div 2 Norrland	Tier 4
2007	285	Div 2 Norrland	Tier 4
2008	276	Div 2 Norrland	Tier 4
2009	355	Div 2 Norrland	Tier 4
2010	131	Div 3 Mellersta Norrland	Tier 5
2011	147	Div 3 Mellersta Norrland	Tier 5
2012	163	Div 3 Mellersta Norrland	Tier 5
2013	134	Div 3 Mellersta Norrland	Tier 5
2014	166	Div 3 Mellersta Norrland	Tier 5
2015	166	Div 3 Mellersta Norrland	Tier 5
2016	284	Div 2 Norra Norrland	Tier 4
2017	294	Div 3 Mellersta Norrland	Tier 5
2018	?	Div 2 Norra Norrland	Tier 4
2019	?	Div 2 Norra Norrland	Tier 4
2020		Div 2 Norra Norrland	Tier 4

* Attendances are provided in the Publikliga sections of the Svenska Fotbollförbundet website.

In their opening home game in the Superettan in 2004 Friska Viljor FC had an attendance of 1,221 against Östers IF. Other well attended home games were the 1,012 spectators for the match with IFK Norrköping and 1,186 spectators for the match with IF Brommapojkarna.

The attendance record for Friska Viljor FC was 2,107 spectators for the match against IFK Göteborg on 1 May 2003.

== Current squad ==
As of 7 February 2025

Note: Flags indicate national team as defined under FIFA eligibility rules; some limited exceptions apply. Players may hold more than one non-FIFA nationality.

No.	Pos.	Nation	Player
1	GK	SWE	Hugo Backman
2	DF	SWE	Calle Nordin
4	MF	SWE	Ludvig Kallin
8	MF	SWE	Fredrik Borgström
9	FW	SWE	Hugo Svensson
10	FW	SWE	Adam Näsmark
12	DF	SWE	Jonathan Powell
14	MF	SWE	Filip Siljander
15	MF	SWE	Isak Sedin

No.	Pos.	Nation	Player
17	MF	SWE	Abeyal Okubagebriael
19	MF	SWE	Araya Zerai
20	MF	SWE	Mahdi Afzali
22	DF	SWE	Simon Hägglund
23	MF	FIN	Jimi Kovalainen
25	FW	SWE	Albin Svensson
30	GK	SWE	Isac Ulander
80	MF	SWE	Charles Sampson

== Achievements ==
- Norrländska Mästerskapet:
  - Winners (1): 1943 (as IF Friska Viljor)
