= Pär Cederqvist =

Swedish footballer (born 1980)

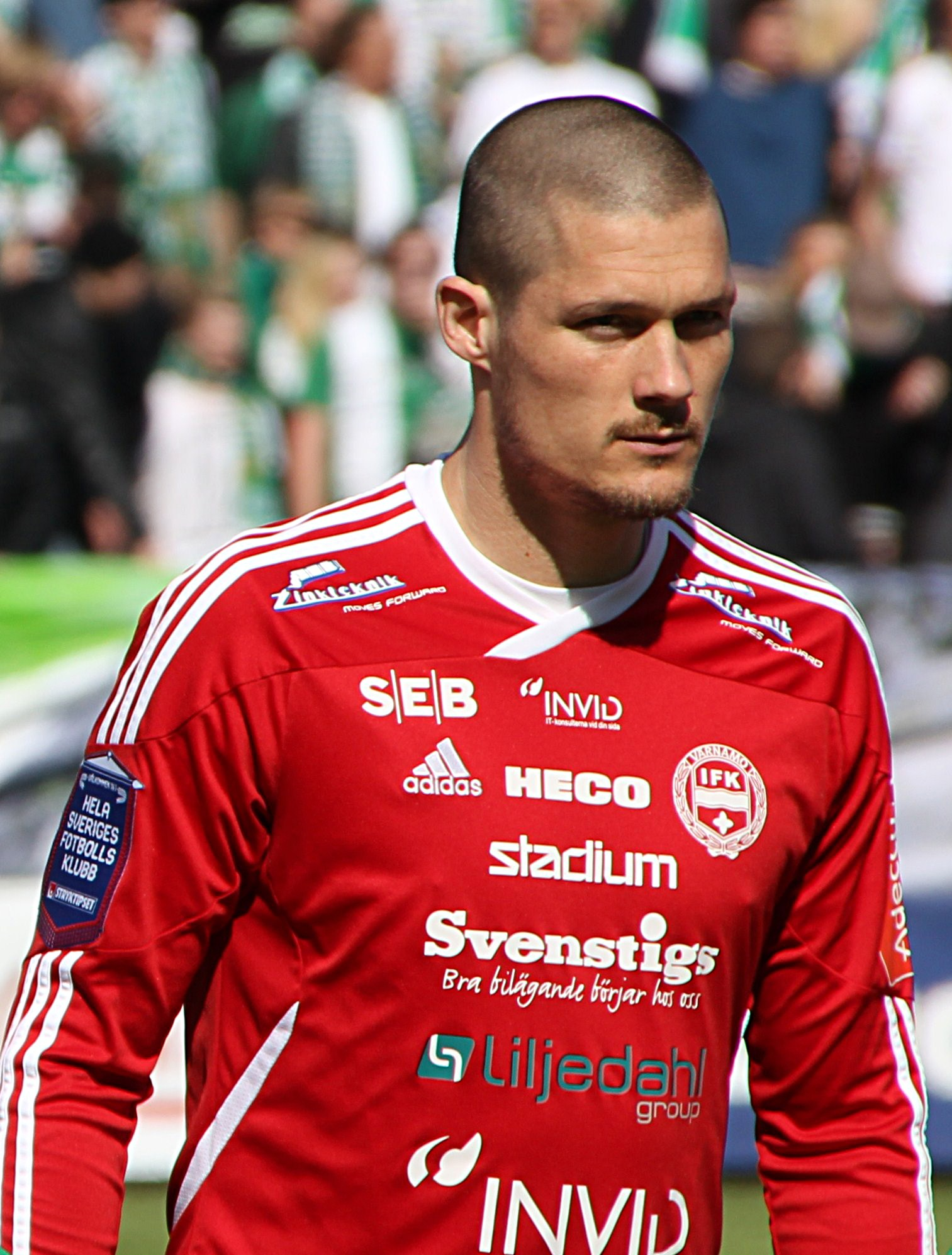
- Cederqvist in 2013

Personal information
- Date of birth: 10 March 1980 (age 46)
- Place of birth: Värnamo, Sweden
- Position: Forward

Youth career
- IFK Värnamo

Senior career*
Years	Team	Apps	(Gls)
2003–2004	Djurgårdens IF	8	(0)
2003	→ Åtvidabergs FF (loan)	13	(6)
2004–2006	Östers IF	40	(12)
2006	Raufoss IL	11	(10)
2006–2007	Walsall F.C.	10	(0)
2007–2009	Landskrona BoIS	75	(30)
2010–2012	Jönköpings Södra IF	68	(26)
2013–2018	IFK Värnamo	170	(57)
Total		395	(135)
- * Club domestic league appearances and goals

Pär Cederqvist (born 10 March 1980), sometimes spelled Pär Cederquist, is a Swedish former professional footballer.

== Career ==
Cederqvist represented Djurgårdens IF, Östers IF, Walsall, Raufoss IL, Landskrona BoIS and Jönköpings Södra IF. He is the all-time top goalscorer of Superettan, as of 2018.

== Honours ==
Djurgårdens IF

- Allsvenskan: 2003
- Svenska Cupen: 2004
