= Andreas Lindberg (footballer) =

Swedish footballer

Personal information
- Full name: Andreas Lindberg
- Date of birth: 14 December 1980 (age 45)
- Place of birth: Sweden
- Height: 1.92 m (6 ft 4 in)
- Position: Goalkeeper

Youth career
- IFK Viksjö

Senior career*
Years	Team	Apps	(Gls)
2003–2005	IFK Norrköping	77	(0)
2006–2008	GIF Sundsvall	22	(0)
2009–2012	Ranheim	58	(0)
2012–2015	IFK Norrköping	6	(0)
2015	Ranheim	4	(0)
- * Club domestic league appearances and goals as of 14 May 2015

Andreas Lindberg (born 14 December 1980) is a Swedish retired footballer who played as a goalkeeper.
