= Vilundavallen =

Football stadium in Upplands Väsby, Sweden

Coordinates: 59.51726°N 17.92165°E

- Interactive map of Vilundavallen
- Location: Upplands Väsby, Sweden
- Capacity: 3,600

Construction
- Expanded: 2005

Vilundavallen is a football stadium in Upplands Väsby. Vilundavallen has a total capacity of 3,600 spectators.
