= Enköpings SK FK =

Swedish football club

- Full name: Enköpings Sportklubb Fotbollsklubb
- Founded: 1914
- Ground: Enavallen; Enköping; Sweden
- Capacity: 4,000
- Chairman: Patrik Bjerketun
- Head coach: Henrik Norrstrom
- Coach: Åke Swärdh
- League: Division 1 Norra
- 2025: 11th of 16
Home colours	Away colours

Enköpings SK FK is the football club of the Swedish sports club Enköpings SK, located in Enköping. The club will be entering the 2025 season in the Ettan Norra after promotion from Division 2 via the promotion playoff in 2024.

Enköpings SK FK are affiliated to the Upplands Fotbollförbund. They play their home matches at the Enavallen in Enköping.

== History ==
Since their foundation on 2 March 1914 Enköpings SK has participated mainly in the middle and upper divisions of the Swedish football league system. Their best period was during the early to mid 2000s with 6 seasons in the Superettan and one in the Allsvenskan in 2003. Following consecutive demotions in 2008 and 2009 along with many subsequent promotions and relegations, the team beat FBK Karlstad over a dramatic two legged promotion/relegation 6-5 to gain promotion. The club currently plays in Ettan Norra which is the third tier of Swedish football.

== Season-to-season ==
Season	Level	League	Pos
1993	Tier 3	Division 2 Östra Svealand	7th
1994	Tier 3	Division 2 Östra Svealand	5th
1995	Tier 3	Division 2 Västra Svealand	3rd
1996	Tier 3	Division 2 Västra Svealand	2nd (P)
1997	Tier 2	Division 1 Norra	12th (R)
1998	Tier 3	Division 2 Västra Svealand	1st (P)
1999	Tier 2	Division 1 Norra	4th
2000	Tier 2	Superettan	7th
2001	Tier 2	Superettan	8th
2002	Tier 2	Superettan	2nd (P)
2003	Tier 1	Allsvenskan	14th (R)
2004	Tier 2	Superettan	14th (R)
2005	Tier 3	Division 2 Norra Svealand	1st (P)
2006 (Note: League restructuring in 2006 resulted in a new division being created at Tier 3 and subsequent divisions dropping a level.)	Tier 3	Division 1 Norra	1st (P)
2007	Tier 2	Superettan	12th
2008	Tier 2	Superettan	15th (R)
2009	Tier 3	Division 1 Norra	13th (R)
2010	Tier 4	Division 2 Norra Svealand	9th
2011	Tier 4	Division 2 Norra Svealand	1st (P)
2012	Tier 3	Division 1 Norra	14th (R)
2013	Tier 4	Division 2 Norra Svealand	12th (R)
2014	Tier 5	Division 3 Östra Svealand	11th (R)
2015	Tier 6	Division 4 Uppland	3rd (P)
2016	Tier 5	Division 3 Östra Svealand	2nd
2017	Tier 5	Division 3 Östra Svealand	2nd
2018	Tier 5	Division 3 Norra Svealand	1st (P)
2019	Tier 4	Division 2 Norra Svealand	11th
2020	Tier 4	Division 2 Norra Svealand	3rd
2021	Tier 4	Division 2 Norra Svealand	14th (R)
2022	Tier 5	Division 3 Norra Svealand	3rd
2023	Tier 5	Division 3 Norra Svealand	1st (P)
2024	Tier 4	Division 2 Norra Svealand	2nd (P)
2025	Tier 3	Ettan Norra	11th

== Honours ==
=== League ===
- Superettan
  - Runners-up (1): 2002
- Division 1 Norra
  - Winners (1): 2006
- Division 2 Norra Svealand
  - Winners (1): 2011
  - Runners-up (1): 2024
- Division 3 Norra Svealand
  - Winners (2): 2018, 2023

== Current Squad ==
As of 3 September, 2026 Note: Flags indicate national team as defined under FIFA eligibility rules; some limited exceptions apply. Players may hold more than one non-FIFA nationality.

No.	Pos.	Nation	Player
1	GK	SWE	Theodor Kvist
2	DF	SWE	William Björk
3	DF	SWE	Melker Hådell
4	DF	SWE	Mattias Özgün
5	DF	SWE	Axel Lundgren
6	DF	SWE	Mohammed Belouchi
7	MF	SWE	Musab Abdi Mohamud (on loan from Västerås SK)
8	MF	KEN	Andres Omondi
9	FW	SWE	Felix Johansson
10	MF	SWE	Hadi Noori
12	FW	NGR	Lucky Nwafor
13	GK	SWE	Gustaf Persson
14	MF	SWE	Alexander Persson-Njie
15	DF	SWE	Filiph Ededal

No.	Pos.	Nation	Player
16	FW	SWE	Joel Zucco
17	DF	SWE	Axel Sveijer
18	FW	SWE	Hannes Förlin
19	FW	KEN	Paul Osama
20	MF	SEN	El Hadji Fallou Faye (on loan from Brommapojkarna)
21	DF	SWE	Viktor Nilsson Gärd
22	MF	SWE	Nathaniel Seidouvy
23	MF	SWE	Hugo Norrlin
25	FW	SWE	Munaser Mohamud (on loan from Sirius)
26	GK	SWE	Nils Öhrn Sinnerstad
32	GK	SWE	Victor Astor
40	MF	SWE	Isak Bråholm
50	FW	SWE	Adrian Hultberg

== Records ==
- Attendance record: 9,102 against Djurgårdens IF (11 May 2003)
- Biggest home win: Allsvenskan: 3–1 v GIF Sundsvall v Örebro SK 2–0 (2003)
- Biggest away win: Allsvenskan: 0–4 v Helsingborgs IF (2 June 2003)
- Biggest home defeat: Allsvenskan: 0–4 v Djurgårdens IF, 0–4 v Halmstads BK (2003)
- Biggest away defeat: Allsvenskan: 0–7 v Hammarby IF (round 23, 2003)
- All-time top scorer: Kjell Mattsson with 247 goals

== Attendances ==
In recent seasons Enköpings SK have had the following average attendances:

Season	Average attendance	Division / Section	Level
2003	4,451	Allsvenskan	Tier 1
2004	1.265	Superettan	Tier 2
2005	768	Div 2 Norra Svealand	Tier 3
2006	885	Div 1 Norra	Tier 3
2007	1,304	Superettan	Tier 2
2008	859	Superettan	Tier 2
2009	552	Div 1 Norra	Tier 3
2010	322	Div 2 Norra Svealand	Tier 4
2011	707	Div 2 Norra Svealand	Tier 4
2012	509	Div 1 Norra	Tier 3
2013	218	Div 2 Norra Svealand	Tier 4
2014	110	Div 3 Östra Svealand	Tier 5
2015	?	Div 4	Tier 6
2016	210	Div 3 Östra Svealand	Tier 5
2017	?	Div 3 Östra Svealand	Tier 5
2018	202	Div 3 Norra Svealand	Tier 5
2019	236	Div 2 Norra Svealand	Tier 4
2020	42	Div 2 Norra Svealand	Tier 4
2021	196	Div 2 Norra Svealand	Tier 4
2022	128	Div 3 Norra Svealand	Tier 5
2023	310	Div 3 Norra Svealand	Tier 5
2024	327	Div 2 Norra Svealand	Tier 4
2025		Ettan Norra	Tier 3

* Attendances are provided in the Publikliga sections of the Svenska Fotbollförbundet website.
