= Mjällby AIF =

Swedish football club

Mjällby
- Full name: Mjällby Allmänna; Idrottsförening
- Founded: 1 April 1939; 87 years ago
- Ground: Strandvallen
- Capacity: 6,750
- Chairman: Jan Sjöblom
- Head coach: Andreas Brännström
- League: Allsvenskan
- 2025: Allsvenskan, 1st of 16 (champions)
- Website: maif.se
Home colours	Away colours

Mjällby Allmänna Idrottsförening, also known simply as Mjällby AIF, Mjällby ([ˈmjɛ̌lːbʏ] M'YELL-bih) or (especially locally) Maif or MAIF, (Note: In the media, "Mjällby AIF" is normally abbreviated "Maif", in accordance with Swedish writing standards that state that acronyms that are pronounced as a word, as opposed to letter by letter, should be spelled with the first letter in upper case and the remaining in lower case, thus "Maif". However, some fans of the club, as well as the club itself, prefer to use only uppercase, "MAIF", even though they also pronounce it as a word: [maj:f].) is a Swedish professional football club based in Hällevik, Mjällby parish, in Sölvesborg Municipality which currently plays in Sweden's highest football league, Allsvenskan. The club is affiliated to Blekinge Fotbollförbund and plays its home games at Strandvallen. The club colours, reflected in their crest and kit, are yellow and black. Formed on 1 April 1939, the club has played thirteen seasons in Allsvenskan. The club's first season in the top league was in 1980. Mjällby AIF is the most successful football team from the province of Blekinge.

Former Sweden men's national football team players Christian Wilhelmsson and Mattias Asper began their careers at the club. Both players also ended their playing careers in Mjällby.

On 18 May 2023, Mjällby AIF played the Swedish Cup final at Strandvallen, losing 1–4 to BK Häcken. On 20 October 2025, Mjällby AIF secured its first Swedish Championship title with three games remaining in the 2025 Allsvenskan. On 15 May 2026, Mjällby played another cup final, resulting in a 2–1 win against Hammarby IF, leading to their first ever Swedish cup victory. Mjällby played in the 2026–27 UEFA Conference League, marking their first ever appearance in European football.

== History ==
Mjällby Allmänna Idrottsförening was founded in 1939 in the small coastal community of Hällevik, in Sölvesborg Municipality, Blekinge County. The club was formed by a group of local football enthusiasts who wanted to create a permanent footballing presence in the area. In its early decades, Mjällby competed in the lower regional divisions of the Swedish football league system, establishing a modest but loyal local following. Throughout the 1940s and 1950s, the team played mainly at the amateur level, gradually building its infrastructure and reputation within Blekinge.

By the mid 1970s, Mjällby began to climb the divisions, becoming one of the more competitive clubs in southern Sweden outside of the major cities. A key moment came in the late 1970s when the club earned promotion to the second tier for the first time, marking the beginning of its rise toward national recognition. This period also saw the development of Strandvallen, the club’s home ground, into a more structured stadium capable of hosting larger crowds.

Mjällby reached the top flight, Allsvenskan, for the first time in 1980. Their debut season in the highest division was viewed as a major achievement for a club from such a small community. Although they were relegated after just one season, they returned several times throughout the 1980s and 1990s, often earning a reputation as a well-organized, resilient side. The club became known as one of Sweden’s classic “yo-yo clubs,” moving between Allsvenskan and the second tier, Superettan, but managing to maintain a stable identity and loyal support.

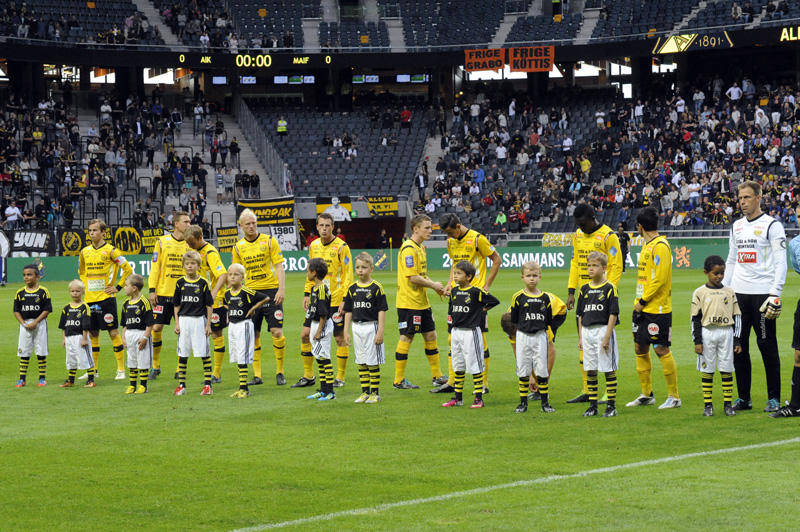
Mjällby AIF players lining up before a 2013 Allsvenskan game.

In the early 2000s, Mjällby established itself more consistently in the top two tiers of Swedish football. Promotion to Allsvenskan in 2009 marked the start of a more stable era, with the team achieving respectable mid-table finishes and building a solid foundation. Despite limited financial resources compared to the country’s larger clubs, Mjällby developed a reputation for strong youth development and scouting in the Blekinge region.

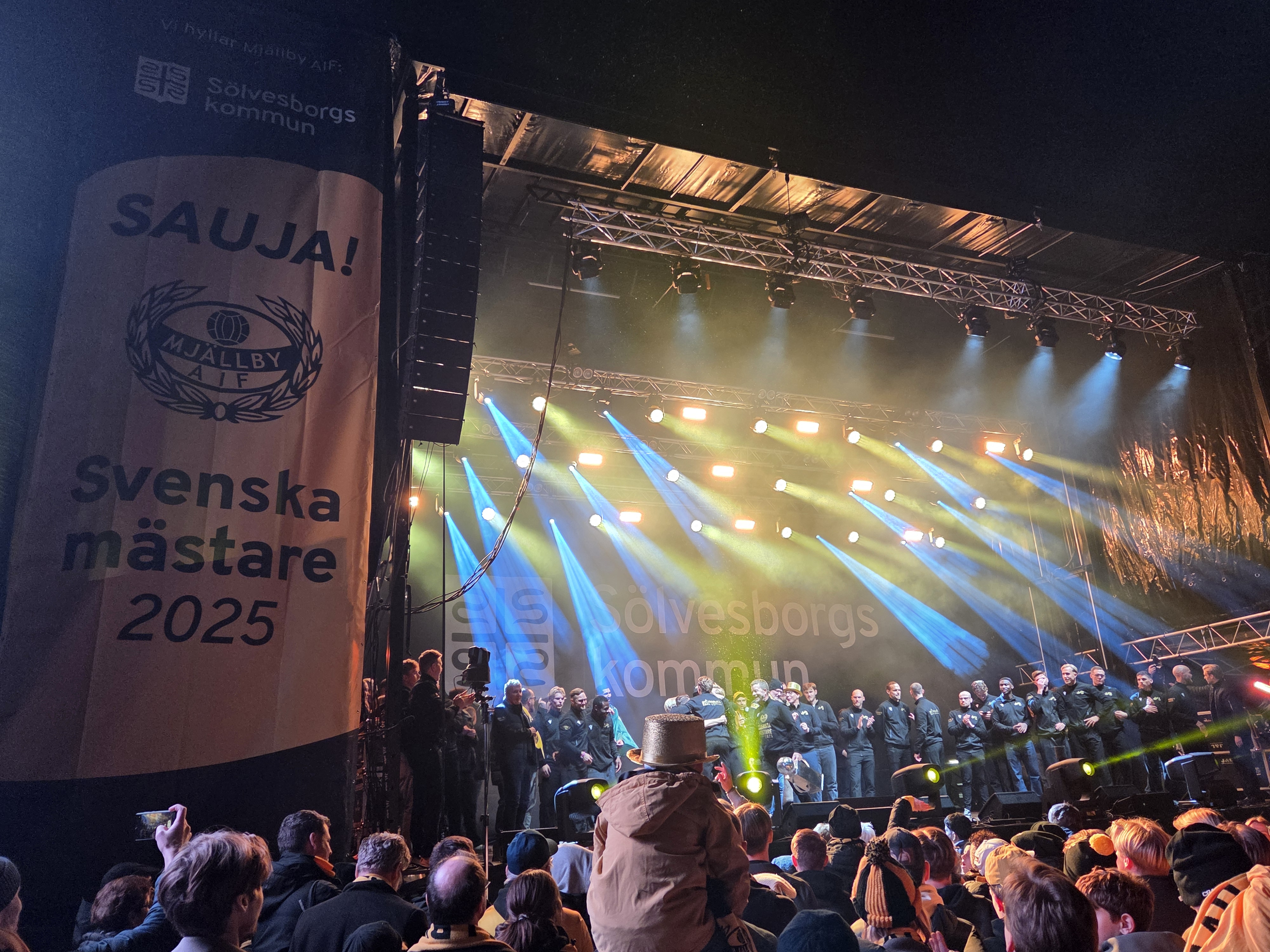
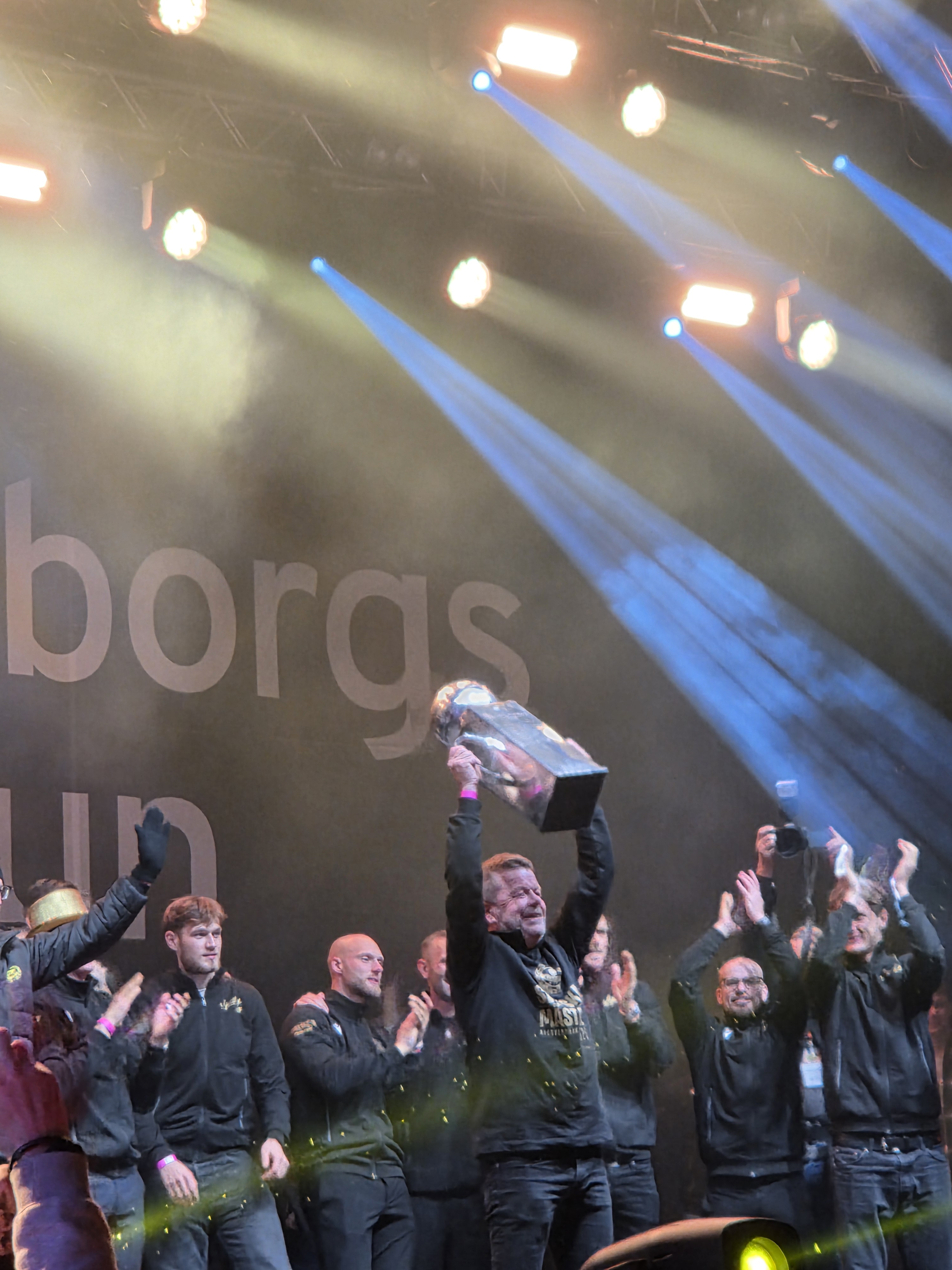
Mjällby AIF celebrating Swedish championship in 2025

The 2025 season became the defining chapter in the club's history. Under coach Anders Torstensson, Mjällby won their first Allsvenskan title on 20 October 2025, securing the championship with three matches to play. The potential triumph and its subsequent success drew worldwide attention and was considered one of the most remarkable underdog stories in modern football, as its team was made up of mostly locally-born players in the nearby village of Hällevik—with a population of 800 inhabitants. For also the first time in their history, Mjällby qualified for European football, entering the 2026–27 UEFA Champions League second qualifying round. Afterwards, they ended the 2025 season with a record-breaking total of 75 points.

== Recent seasons ==
Season	Division	Tier	Pos	Pl	W	D	L	+	–	P	Cup	Note
2016	Division 1 Södra	III	8	26	7	10	9	35	39	31	–	
2017	Division 1 Södra	III	2	26	16	5	5	60	29	53	–	Lost the Promotion playoffs to Örgryte
2018	Division 1 Södra	III	↑ 1	30	21	6	3	73	29	69	–	Promoted to Superettan
2019	Superettan	II	↑ 1	30	17	6	7	44	31	57	Semifinals	Promoted to Allsvenskan
2020	Allsvenskan	I	5	30	13	8	9	48	44	47	Group stage	
2021	Allsvenskan	I	9	30	9	11	10	34	27	38	Group stage	
2022	Allsvenskan	I	9	30	11	10	9	33	33	43	Runners-up	
2023	Allsvenskan	I	10	30	12	5	13	32	34	41	Quarterfinals	
2024	Allsvenskan	I	5	30	14	8	8	44	35	50	Quarterfinals	
2025	Allsvenskan	I	1	30	23	6	1	57	18	75	Winners	Qualified for Champions League, second qualifying round

== Rivalries ==
Mjällby's rivals can be divided into three categories. The first category includes the closest competitors geographically in Blekinge and northeastern Skåne. Historically, the most local rivals have been Sölvesborgs GoIF and Ifö Bromölla IF. Over a longer time and recently games against FK Karlskrona and Kristianstad FC have been described as derbies. Both of the clubs are rivals to Mjällby on a regional level. Games against FK Karlskrona are of importance as they involve the two best clubs in the province of Blekinge. And also a general rivalry, that also excludes sports between western and eastern part of the province. Where Mjällby represents the western part and Karlskrona the eastern part of Blekinge.

The third category, rivals in the south of Sweden who usually play in the Allsvenskan and Superettan (first and second tier). Especially games against Malmö FF are considered by many Mjällby fans and players to be the most prestigious. From the Malmö fans' perspective, the matches are not as important as they usually believe they have bigger competitors in Allsvenskan. In this category but with less prestige, in descending order these clubs can be included, Kalmar FF, Östers IF, Helsingborgs IF and Landskrona BoIS. In the latter category, it contains clubs that plays in the same league level as Mjällby more frequently than the clubs in the first and second categories.

== Stadium ==
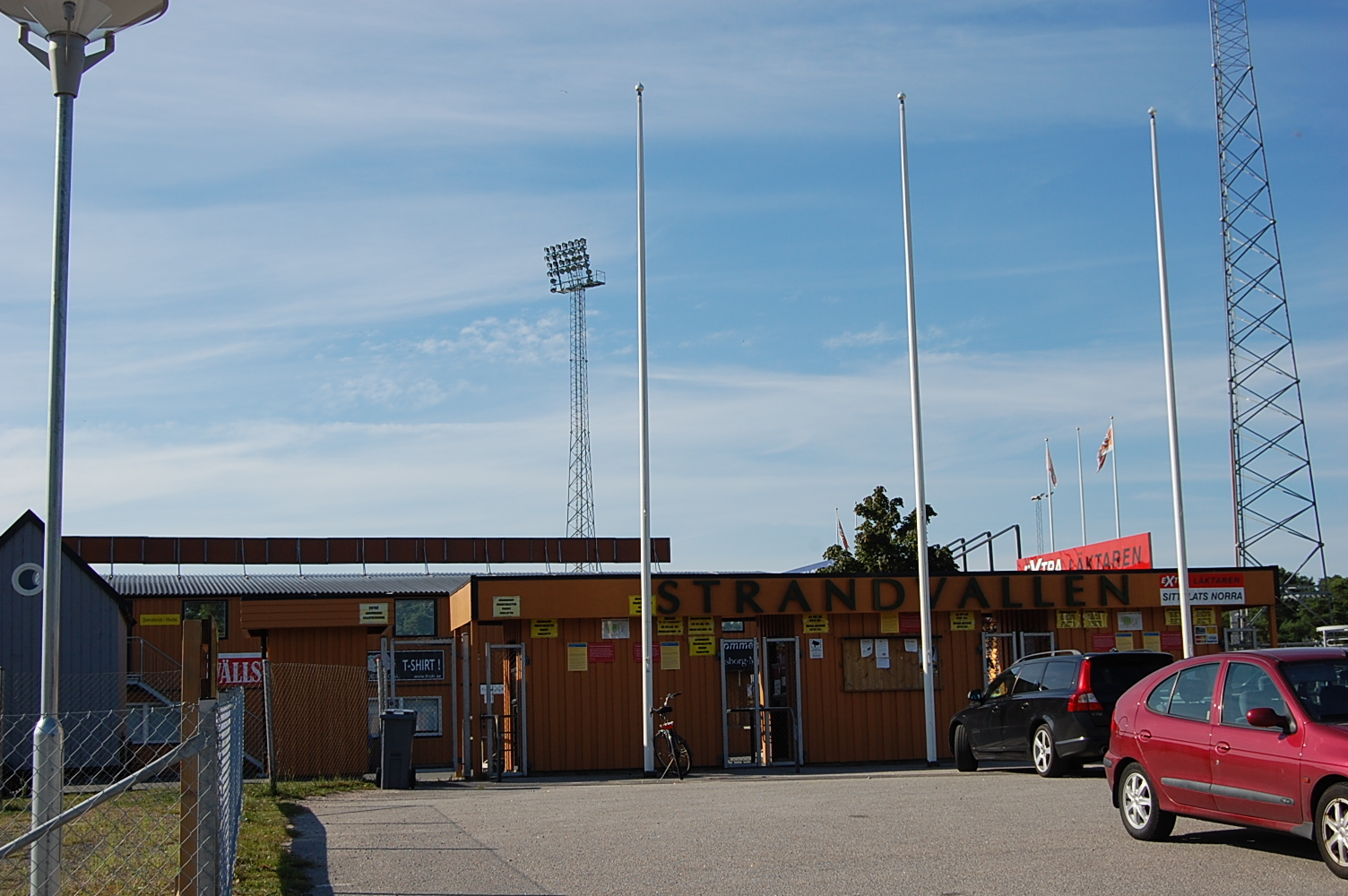
Main entrance to Strandvallen.

Strandvallen, a multi-use stadium in Hällevik, serves the home stadium of Mjällby AIF. The stadium holds 7,000 people and was built in 1953.

== Players ==
=== First-team squad ===
As of 6 September 2026

Note: Flags indicate national team as defined under FIFA eligibility rules; some limited exceptions apply. Players may hold more than one non-FIFA nationality.

No.	Pos.	Nation	Player
1	GK	NOR	Sebastian Hansen
2	DF	SWE	Ludvig Svanberg
3	DF	FRO	Martin Agnarsson
4	DF	SWE	Axel Norén
5	DF	PAK	Abdullah Iqbal
6	MF	DEN	Mads Enggård
7	MF	SWE	Viktor Gustafson
8	MF	SWE	Teo Helge
9	FW	TUN	Ali Youssef (on loan from Apollon Limassol)
10	MF	DEN	Jeppe Kjær
11	FW	FIN	Timo Stavitski
13	GK	SWE	Robin Wallinder
14	MF	SWE	Villiam Granath
18	FW	SWE	Jacob Bergström

No.	Pos.	Nation	Player
19	FW	GAM	Paul Colley
20	MF	SWE	Måns Isaksson
21	FW	DEN	Villum Dalsgaard
22	MF	SWE	Jesper Gustavsson (captain)
23	FW	FRO	Áki Samuelsen
24	DF	SWE	Tom Pettersson
25	MF	DEN	Max Nielsen
26	DF	USA	Ian Hoffmann (on loan from Lech Poznań)
27	MF	SWE	Ludvig Tidstrand
29	MF	SWE	Olle Lindberg
31	DF	SWE	Dani Hodžić
33	DF	FIN	Tony Miettinen
35	GK	SWE	Alexander Lundin
39	MF	SWE	Romeo Leandersson

=== Out on loan ===
Note: Flags indicate national team as defined under FIFA eligibility rules; some limited exceptions apply. Players may hold more than one non-FIFA nationality.

No.	Pos.	Nation	Player
30	GK	SWE	Hugo Fagerberg (at IFK Norrköping until 30 November 2026)
—	GK	SWE	Amar Dževlan (at Nordic United until 30 November 2026)
—	DF	SWE	Liam Svensson (at Skövde until 30 November 2026)
—	DF	CMR	Christian Tchouante (at Železničar Pančevo until 30 June 2027)
—	MF	SWE	Manasse Kusu (at Örebro until 30 November 2026)

No.	Pos.	Nation	Player
—	MF	SWE	Filip Åkesson Linderoth (at Sölvesborg until 30 November 2026)
—	MF	SWE	Kimmen Nennesson (at Kristianstad until 30 November 2026)
19	FW	GAM	Abdoulie Manneh (at Cercle Brugge until 30 June 2027)
21	FW	NGR	Ibrahim Adewale (at Norrby until 30 November 2026)
—	FW	SWE	Isac Johnsson (at Sölvesborg until 30 November 2026)

== Managers ==
Name	Tenure	Refs
(Sweden) Johnny Ringerg	(1954–56)	
(Sweden) Sven-Olle Malmberg	(1956–58)	
(Sweden) John Nilsson	(1959)	
(Sweden) Gösta Färm	(1960–61)	
(Sweden) Elon Nilsson	(1962)	
(Sweden) Folke Jönsson	(1963)	
(Sweden) Arne Lindskog	(1964)	
(Sweden) Bror Sjöholm	(1965–66)	
(Sweden) Kjell Larsson	(1967)	
(Sweden) Gösta Färm	(1968)	
(Austria) Adolf Vogel	(1969–70)	
(Sweden) Arne Svensson	(1971–74)	
(Sweden) Jan-Ove Jansson	(1975–78)	
(Sweden) Bosse Nilsson	(1979–80)	
(Sweden) Håkan Håkansson	(1981)	
(Sweden) Göran Bogren	(1982–84)	
(Sweden) Anders Linderoth	(1985–89)	
(Sweden) Ingvar Johansson	(1990)	
(Germany) Peter Antoine	(1 January 1991 – 30 June 1993)	
(Sweden) Jan Mattsson	(1993)	
(Germany) Peter Antoine	(1994–96)	
(Russia) Sergei Prigoda	(1997–98)	
(Sweden) Hans Larsson	(1999–2002)	
(Sweden) Sören Cratz	(2003–05)	
(Sweden) Thomas Andersson-Borstam	(2005 – 31 December 2008)	
(Sweden) Peter Swärdh	(1 January 2009 – 31 December 2012)	
(Sweden) Anders Torstensson	(1 January 2013 – 16 October 2013)	
(Sweden) Lars Jacobsson	(16 October 2013 – 2014)	
(Sweden) Anders Linderoth	(21 July 2014 – 18 May 2015)	
(Sweden) Hasse Larsson	(19 May 2015 – 31 December 2015)	
(Sweden) Patrik Rosengren	(1 January 2016 – 31 August 2016)	
(Sweden) Mattias Asper	(31 August 2016 – 5 September 2016)	
(Sweden) Jonas Andersson	(5 September 2016 – 18 June 2018)	
(Serbia) Miloš Milojević	(19 June 2018 – 1 December 2019)	
(Sweden) Marcus Lantz	(1 January 2020 – 31 December 2020)	
(Sweden) Christian Järdler	(1 January 2021 – 3 August 2021)	
(Sweden) Anders Torstensson	(4 August 2021 – 31 December 2021)	
(Sweden) Andreas Brännström	(1 January 2022 – 31 December 2022)	
(Sweden) Anders Torstensson	(1 January 2023 – 30 November 2025)	
(Norway) Karl Marius Aksum	(1 December 2025 – 8 September 2026)	
(Sweden) Andreas Brännström	(8 September 2026 – present)	

== European record ==
Season	Competition	Round	Opponent	Home	Away	Agg.
2026–27	UEFA Champions League	2QR	(Gibraltar) Lincoln Red Imps	3−0	0−0	3−0
2026–27	UEFA Champions League	3QR	(Slovakia) Slovan Bratislava	1–2	0–2	1–4
2026–27	UEFA Europa League	PO	(Austria) Red Bull Salzburg	0−1	0−3	0−4
2026–27	UEFA Conference League	League Phase	(Andorra) Inter Club d'Escaldes	2−0	—N/a	TBD
2026–27	UEFA Conference League	League Phase	(Georgia (country)) Iberia 1999	—N/a	1−1	TBD
2026–27	UEFA Conference League	League Phase	(Bosnia and Herzegovina) Borac Banja Luka		—N/a	TBD
2026–27	UEFA Conference League	League Phase	(Kazakhstan) Kairat	—N/a		TBD
2026–27	UEFA Conference League	League Phase	(Cyprus) Pafos		—N/a	TBD
2026–27	UEFA Conference League	League Phase	(Italy) Atalanta	—N/a		TBD

== Honours ==
- Swedish Champions (Note: The title of "Swedish Champions" has been awarded to the winner of four different competitions over the years. Between 1896 and 1925 the title was awarded to the winner of Svenska Mästerskapet, a stand-alone cup tournament. No club were given the title between 1926 and 1930 even though the first-tier league Allsvenskan was played. In 1931 the title was reinstated and awarded to the winner of Allsvenskan. Between 1982 and 1990 a play-off in cup format was held at the end of the league season to decide the champions. After the play-off format in 1991 and 1992 the title was decided by the winner of Mästerskapsserien, an additional league after the end of Allsvenskan. Since the 1993 season the title has once again been awarded to the winner of Allsvenskan.)
  - Winners (1): 2025

=== League ===
- Allsvenskan:
  - Champions (1): 2025
- Superettan:
  - Winners (2): 2009, 2019
- Division 1 Södra:
  - Winners (1): 2018
  - Runners-up (1): 1988

=== Cup ===
- Svenska Cupen
  - Winners (1): 2025–26
  - Runners-up (1): 2022–23
