= Assyriska FF =

Swedish football club

- Full name: Assyriska Fotbollsföreningen
- Nickname: AFF
- Founded: 1974; 52 years ago
- Ground: Södertälje Fotbollsarena, Södertälje, Sweden
- Capacity: 8,500
- Chairman: Moussa Esa
- Manager: Abbod Kocadag
- League: Ettan Fotboll
- 2026: Ettan Norra, 11th of 16
Home colours	Away colours

Assyriska Fotbollsföreningen, also known simply as Assyriska FF, is a Swedish football club based in Södertälje, Stockholm County. The club, formed in 1974 by Assyrian immigrants, has advanced through the league system and is currently playing in the third highest Swedish league, Division 1. They played in the highest Swedish football league Allsvenskan in 2005 where their games were broadcast in over 80 countries. The club has also played a final in Svenska Cupen, which was lost against IF Elfsborg in 2003.

Assyriska is often viewed as a substitute national team by the Assyrian people.

The club has a fan base from all over the world and has also their own pop song which is called "My Assyrian team – the team of my dream". A documentary film about Assyriska called "Assyriska: A National Team Without A Nation" was also made in 2006 by Nuri Kino and Erik Sandberg. The success of the documentary film made it possible to win the Golden Palm Award at the Beverly Hills Film Festival.

== History ==
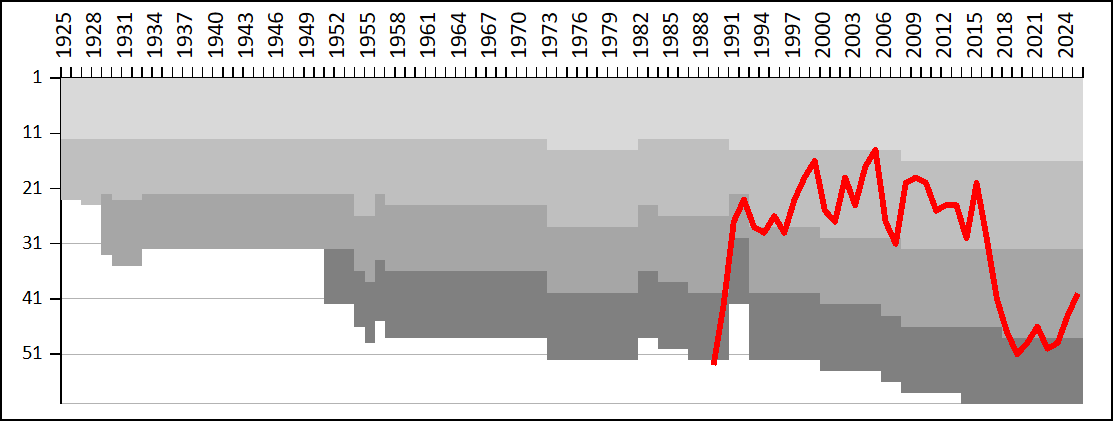
A chart showing the progress of Assyriska through the swedish football league system. The different shades of gray represent league divisions.

Assyriska Föreningen in Södertälje was founded in 1971 by ethnic Assyrian refugees from Turkey who belonged to the Syriac Orthodox Church. Three years later, a football team was started and played its first season in the lowest league in 1975. They advanced through the divisions and reached the second highest league, Division 1 (today replaced by Superettan), in 1992, as the first immigrant team ever. The team was however relegated in 1993, and the next few years, the club played every second year in Division 1 before managing to stay there for more than one season in 1997.

In 2003 Assyriska made it to the final in Svenska Cupen, where they lost with 0–2 against IF Elfsborg. On the way to the final, they won against IFK Göteborg with 4–1 and Djurgårdens IF with 0–4.

They lost a promotion play-off against Örebro SK in 1999, but five years later, in 2004, Assyriska was promoted to Allsvenskan, the highest league, for the first time as Örebro SK was relegated due to economical problems. Assyriska's debut in Allsvenskan went well in the beginning and they had a couple of notable wins against big clubs as IFK Göteborg with 0–3 and against IF Elfsborg with 1–3. However Assyriska were relegated after only one season in the Allsvenskan, where they finished last. Since then Assyriska had fallen into Division 1 North, but enjoyed a strong season in 2007 to finish champions and were promoted back into the Superettan.

At the close of the 2009 season Assyriska, having held off the challenge of rivals Syrianska FC to finish third in the Superettan table, faced Djurgårdens IF in a play-off for a place in the Allsvenskan in 2010. Assyriska won the first match at home 2–0 but were overcome 3–0 after extra time in the repeat. In season 2010, Assyriska finished 4th in the Superettan. But 2010 was a season in which football became irrelevant for Assyriska after the murder of player Eddie Moussa.

Since then, the team has made a series of mid-table finishes and remains in the Superettan for the 2013 season.

== Stadium ==
Assyriska Föreningen's primary stadium since 2006 is Södertälje Fotbollsarena. Until 2006, the team played at the old stadium Bårsta IP.

== Supporters ==
Assyriska Föreningen's official fan club is called Zelge Fans. They were first started 1993 by a group of Assyriska supporters in Södertälje. They were known as Neshre, which means eagle (or eagles) in Syriac. Three months after they launched, the club changed its name to Zelge Fans, Zelge meaning "sun rays" in Syriac. The sun rays are a symbol of the Assyrian flag, which is where the idea to name the fan club Zelge Fans came from. Most of the members are Assyrians, but the Zelge fan club also has many Swedish members.

Assyriska's fans are also growing in numbers as a result of the internet. During its early years, Assyriska did not have the mass means of communication to be able to spread their team information consistently to other mass Assyrian areas (Chicago, New Jersey, California, Toronto, Sydney, etc.). With the tech age, Assyriska has been able to spread its fan base outside of Södertälje and become known in over 80 countries. Acting as their national team, Assyriska represents the entire population of Assyrians throughout the world.

Assyriska has become a true symbol for Assyrians traveling to Sweden. Many make it their goal to watch an Assyriska match at least once when they travel to Sweden.

== Players ==
=== First-team squad ===
As of 4 September, 2026

Note: Flags indicate national team as defined under FIFA eligibility rules; some limited exceptions apply. Players may hold more than one non-FIFA nationality.

No.	Pos.	Nation	Player
1	GK	SWE	Ilmar Eskander
2	DF	SWE	Elias Ländin
3	DF	SWE	Liam Tahwildaran
4	DF	SWE	Sebastian Wändin
5	DF	SWE	Axel Karlsson
6	MF	GUI	Amadou Kalabane
7	MF	SWE	Felix Aaltonen
8	DF	SWE	Alfredo Nordeman
9	FW	SWE	Leo Jonsson
10	MF	SWE	Kevin Jarrett-Marston
11	MF	SWE	Júnior Gonçalves Karlstedt
12	MF	SWE	Samuel Edgren
13	FW	SWE	Alexander Jacob
14	FW	SWE	Viktor Widerberg

No.	Pos.	Nation	Player
15	DF	UKR	Volodymyr Khomenko
16	FW	SWE	Linus Hillemar
17	FW	NGR	Samuel Nnamani
18	MF	CHI	Martín Larraín
19	MF	SWE	Nemanja Jovanovic
20	MF	SWE	Ahmad Raouf
21	GK	SWE	Liam Rönnelöw
22	DF	IRQ	Martin Haddad
23	MF	SWE	Victor Åsberg
24	DF	SWE	Alessandro Jacob
25	MF	SWE	Daniil Ishchyk
30	FW	SWE	Serhii Ishchyk
31	GK	NGR	Kingdom Osayi
-	FW	DEN	Amar Diagne

=== Retired numbers ===
18 – Eddie Moussa, forward (2001–2010)

=== Notable players ===
- (Sweden) Mikael Ishak
- Kennedy Bakircioglu
- Nahir Besara
- David Durmaz
- Kachir Eskander
- Marcus Linday
- Raby Youssef
- Daniel Nannskog
- Ceyhun Eris
- Metin Tasci
- Stefan Batan

== Staff ==
=== Sports ===
- Head Coach: Abbod Kocadag
- Assistant Coach: Eufrat Barmousa

== Achievements ==
=== League ===
- Division 1 Norra:
  - Winners (1): 2007
  - Runners-up (1): 1999

=== Cups ===
- Svenska Cupen:
  - Runners-up (1): 2003

== Notable coaches ==
- (Germany) Peter Antoine (1999)
- (Sweden) Bo Petersson (2002)
- (Sweden) Conny Karlsson (2003–2004, 2009)
- (Portugal) José Morais (2005)
- (Sweden) Rikard Norling (2010–2011)
- (Sweden) Kachir Eskander (1997-2011)

== Season to season ==
Season	Level	Division	Section	Position	Movements
1993	Tier 2	Division 1	Norra	14th	Relegated
1994	Tier 3	Division 2	Västra Svealand	1st	Promoted
1995	Tier 2	Division 1	Norra	12th	Relegated
1996	Tier 3	Division 2	Västra Svealand	1st	Promoted
1997	Tier 2	Division 1	Norra	9th	
1998	Tier 2	Division 1	Norra	5th	
1999	Tier 2	Division 1	Norra	2nd	
2000	Tier 2	Superettan		11th	
2001	Tier 2	Superettan		13th	
2002	Tier 2	Superettan		5th	
2003	Tier 2	Superettan		10th	
2004	Tier 2	Superettan		3rd	Promoted
2005	Tier 1	Allsvenskan		14th	Relegated
2006*	Tier 2	Superettan		13th	Relegated
2007	Tier 3	Division 1	Norra	1st	Promoted
2008	Tier 2	Superettan		4th	
2009	Tier 2	Superettan		3rd	Promotion Playoffs
2010	Tier 2	Superettan		4th	
2011	Tier 2	Superettan		9th	
2012	Tier 2	Superettan		8th	
2013	Tier 2	Superettan		8th	
2014	Tier 2	Superettan		14th	Relegation Playoffs
2015	Tier 2	Superettan		4th	
2016	Tier 2	Superettan		14th	Relegated
2017	Tier 3	Division 1	Norra	9th	
2018	Tier 3	Division 1	Norra	15th	Relegated
2019	Tier 4	Division 2	Södra Svealand	3rd	
2020	Tier 4	Division 2	Södra Svealand	1st	Promoted
2021	Tier 3	Ettan	Norra	14th	Relegated
2022	Tier 4	Division 2	Södra Svealand	2nd	Promotion Playoffs
2023	Tier 4	Division 2	Södra Svealand	1st	Promoted
2024	Tier 3	Ettan	Norra	12th	
2025	Tier 3	Ettan	Norra	6th	

* League restructuring in 2006 resulted in a new division being created at Tier 3 and subsequent divisions dropping a level.

== See also ==
- Syrianska FC
- List of Assyrian-Syriac football teams in Sweden
