= IF Sylvia =

Association football club in Sweden

- Full name: Idrottsföreningen Sylvia
- Founded: 1922; 104 years ago
- Dissolved: 2026; 0 years ago
- Ground: Platinumcars Arena, Norrköping
- Capacity: 17,000
- Chairman: Pelle Holm
- Coach: Henric Pekkala
- League: Division 2 Södra Svealand
- 2024: Division 2 Södra Svealand, 2nd of 14
- Website: svenskalag.se/ifsylvia
| Home colours | Away colours |

IF Sylvia was a Swedish football club based in Norrköping. The club formed on 19 May 1922, and played as high as the second highest division in Swedish football, Superettan, in 2000–2003 and 2007. The club was affiliated to the Östergötlands Fotbollförbund.

In the early years, the club was also playing bandy and other sports.

In March 2013, IF Sylvia and IFK Norrköping started a cooperation where Sylvia would act as a nursery for youth players from IFK Norrköping. Sylvia would also be able to loan players from IFK Norrköping at short notice.

At an annual meeting in October 2025, it was decided that the club should seek a merger with Lindö FF, which in practice meant that Sylvia would be dissolved as its own club. In February 2026, the Swedish Football Association decided to transfer Sylvia's place in Division 2 to Lindö FF.

== Achievements ==
- Division 1 Södra:
  - Winners (1): 2006
  - Runners-up (1): 2011
- Division 2 Södra Svealand:
  - Winners (1): 2018
- Division 2 Västra Svealand:
  - Runners-up (2): 1994, 1997
- Division 3 Östra Svealand:
  - Winners (1): 1993

== Season to season ==
| Season | Level | Division | Section | Position | Movements |
|---|---|---|---|---|---|
| 1993 | Tier 4 | Division 3 | Östra Svealand | 1st | Promoted |
| 1994 | Tier 3 | Division 2 | Västra Svealand | 2nd' | Promotion Playoffs |
| 1995 | Tier 3 | Division 2 | Västra Svealand | 4th | |
| 1996 | Tier 3 | Division 2 | Västra Svealand | 5th | |
| 1997 | Tier 3 | Division 2 | Västra Svealand | 2nd | Promotion Playoffs – Promoted |
| 1998 | Tier 2 | Division 1 | Södra | 3rd | |
| 1999 | Tier 2 | Division 1 | Norra | 3rd | |
| 2000 | Tier 2 | Superettan | | 9th | |
| 2001 | Tier 2 | Superettan | | 7th | |
| 2002 | Tier 2 | Superettan | | 13th | |
| 2003 | Tier 2 | Superettan | | 16th | Relegated |
| 2004 | Tier 3 | Division 2 | Västra Svealand | 4th | |
| 2005 | Tier 3 | Division 2 | Östra Svealand | 3rd | Promoted |
| 2006* | Tier 3 | Division 1 | Södra | 1st | Promoted |
| 2007 | Tier 2 | Superettan | | 16th | Relegated |
| 2008 | Tier 3 | Division 1 | Norra | 9th | |
| 2009 | Tier 3 | Division 1 | Södra | 9th | |
| 2010 | Tier 3 | Division 1 | Södra | 3rd | |
| 2011 | Tier 3 | Division 1 | Södra | 2nd | Promotion Playoffs |
| 2012 | Tier 3 | Division 1 | Södra | 7th | |
| 2013 | Tier 3 | Division 1 | Södra | 7th | |
| 2014 | Tier 3 | Division 1 | Norra | 12th | Relegated |
| 2015 | Tier 4 | Division 2 | Södra Svealand | 6th | |
| 2016 | Tier 4 | Division 2 | Södra Svealand | 10th | |
| 2017 | Tier 4 | Division 2 | Södra Svealand | 6th | |
| 2018 | Tier 4 | Division 2 | Södra Svealand | 1st | Promoted |
| 2019 | Tier 3 | Division 1 | Norra | 9th | |
| 2020 | Tier 3 | Ettan | Norra | 5th | |
| 2021 | Tier 3 | Ettan | Norra | 10th | |
| 2022 | Tier 3 | Ettan | Norra | 10th | |
| 2023 | Tier 3 | Ettan | Norra | 16th | Relegated |
| 2024 | Tier 4 | Division 2 | Södra Svealand | 2nd | |

* League restructuring in 2006 resulted in a new division being created at Tier 3 and subsequent divisions dropping a level.

== Attendances ==
In recent seasons IF Sylvia have had the following average attendances:

| Season | Average attendance | Division / Section | Level |
|---|---|---|---|
| 2005 | 300 | Div 2 Östra Svealand | Tier 3 |
| 2006 | 233 | Div 1 Södra | Tier 3 |
| 2007 | 1,357 | Superettan | Tier 2 |
| 2008 | 221 | Div 1 Norra | Tier 3 |
| 2009 | 241 | Div 1 Södra | Tier 3 |
| 2010 | 305 | Div 1 Södra | Tier 3 |
| 2011 | 430 | Div 1 Södra | Tier 3 |
| 2012 | 254 | Div 1 Södra | Tier 3 |
| 2013 | 218 | Div 1 Södra | Tier 3 |
| 2014 | 154 | Div 1 Södra | Tier 3 |
| 2015 | 163 | Div 2 Södra Svealand | Tier 4 |
| 2016 | 186 | Div 2 Södra Svealand | Tier 4 |
| 2017 | 66 | Div 2 Södra Svealand | Tier 4 |
| 2018 | ? | Div 2 Södra Svealand | Tier 4 |

* Attendances are provided in the Publikliga sections of the Svenska Fotbollförbundet website.

== Records ==
- Highest attendance, Idrottsparken: 11,114 vs. IFK Norrköping, 3 May 2007 (Final score, 1–2, in Superettan)

== Current squad ==
As of 1 September 2023

Note: Flags indicate national team as defined under FIFA eligibility rules; some limited exceptions apply. Players may hold more than one non-FIFA nationality.

| No. | Pos. | Nation | Player |
|---|---|---|---|
| 2 | DF | SWE | Sebastian Detterman |
| 3 | DF | SWE | Philip Bonde |
| 4 | DF | SWE | Edvin Tellgren (on loan from IFK Norrköping) |
| 5 | MF | SWE | Abdul Aziz |
| 6 | DF | SWE | Ali Kachmar |
| 7 | DF | SWE | Amer Jusic (on loan from Åtvidabergs FF) |
| 8 | DF | SWE | Hugo Lewander |
| 9 | FW | BIH | Eldin Ibrahimbegović |
| 10 | MF | SWE | Amer Ibrahimovic |
| 11 | MF | SWE | Jakob Lindahl |
| 12 | FW | SWE | Daniel Hanna |
| 13 | MF | SWE | Isak Ellbring |

| No. | Pos. | Nation | Player |
|---|---|---|---|
| 14 | DF | SWE | Anton Ståhl |
| 16 | MF | SWE | Pontus Tillmar |
| 17 | MF | SWE | Besfort Kalludra |
| 18 | MF | SWE | David Ström |
| 19 | FW | SWE | Leo Jansson |
| 20 | FW | SWE | Aleksandar Azizovic |
| 22 | DF | SWE | Jonathan Jonsson |
| 23 | FW | SWE | John Bliderus Onoseke-Longadi |
| 24 | MF | SWE | Elvis Lindkvist |
| 28 | MF | SWE | Fritiof Hellichius |
| 30 | GK | SWE | David Andersson (on loan from IFK Norrköping) |

== Management ==
=== Technical staff ===
As of 4 January 2018

| Name | Role |
|---|---|
| (Sweden) Rickard Johansson | Head coach |
| (Sweden) Daniel Jernberg | Assistant coach |
| (Sweden) Kim Vaattovaara | Assistant coach |
| (Sweden) Håkan Andersson | Physiotherapist |
