= 1988 Division 2 (Swedish football) =

Swedish football league season

Statistics of Swedish football Division 2 for the 1988 season.

== League standings ==
=== Norra ===
Pos	Team	Pld	W	D	L	GF	GA	GD	Pts	Promotion or relegation
1	Kiruna FF	26	17	6	3	83	26	+57	40	Promoted
2	Enköpings SK	26	17	5	4	60	21	+39	39	
3	IFK Östersund	26	14	5	7	47	34	+13	33	
4	Films SK	26	14	4	8	49	36	+13	32	
5	Hudiksvalls ABK	26	11	8	7	35	25	+10	30	
6	Råsunda IS, Solna	26	11	7	8	53	37	+16	29	
7	Sandvikens IF	26	12	4	10	48	37	+11	28	
8	Tegs SK/Umeå FC	26	10	6	10	42	35	+7	26	
9	Gimonäs CK	26	10	6	10	40	39	+1	26	
10	Älvsby IF	26	11	3	12	30	54	−24	25	
11	Örnsköldsviks FF	26	7	5	14	28	42	−14	19	
12	Matfors IF	26	7	4	15	41	52	−11	18	Relegated
13	IFK Sundsvall	26	7	2	17	27	56	−29	16	Relegated
14	IFK Kalix	26	1	1	24	19	108	−89	3	Relegated

=== Mellersta ===
Pos	Team	Pld	W	D	L	GF	GA	GD	Pts	Promotion or relegation
1	Motala AIF	26	22	0	4	69	25	+44	44	Promoted
2	Stockholms Spårvägars GoIF	26	19	4	3	56	25	+31	42	
3	Älvsjö AIK	26	15	3	8	55	37	+18	33	
4	Linköpings FF	26	12	6	8	49	42	+7	30	
5	Södertälje FF	26	13	3	10	38	28	+10	29	
6	Nyköpings BIS	26	11	6	9	36	23	+13	28	
7	Tyresö FF	26	12	4	10	42	31	+11	28	
8	Spånga IS	26	12	4	10	38	33	+5	28	
9	Falu BS, Falun	26	8	6	12	31	51	−20	22	
10	IFK Västerås	26	7	6	13	37	45	−8	20	
11	Forssa BK, Borlänge	26	5	9	12	27	45	−18	19	
12	Katrineholms SK	26	6	4	16	33	56	−23	16	Relegated
13	IF Verdandi, Eskilstuna	26	5	3	18	21	60	−39	13	Relegated
14	Ludvika FK	26	3	6	17	21	52	−31	12	Relegated

=== Västra ===
Pos	Team	Pld	W	D	L	GF	GA	GD	Pts	Promotion or relegation
1	Jonsereds IF	26	15	6	5	46	23	+23	36	Promoted
2	IFK Strömstad	26	14	8	4	45	25	+20	36	
3	Degerfors IF	26	14	6	6	49	35	+14	34	
4	Gunnilse IS, Angered	26	12	9	5	39	20	+19	33	
5	Skövde AIK	26	13	4	9	49	39	+10	30	
6	Norrstrands IF, Karlstad	26	10	7	9	36	33	+3	27	
7	Åsa IF	26	10	6	10	56	39	+17	26	
8	Tidaholms GIF	26	10	6	10	35	43	−8	26	
9	Holmalunds IF, Alingsås	26	9	6	11	40	51	−11	24	
10	Karlslunds IF, Örebro	26	9	5	12	35	41	−6	23	
11	Norrby IF, Borås	26	7	6	13	27	40	−13	20	
12	Varbergs BoIS	26	6	7	13	41	54	−13	19	Relegated
13	Trollhättans FK	26	6	6	14	28	44	−16	18	Relegated
14	Melleruds IF	26	5	2	19	41	80	−39	12	Relegated

=== Södra ===
Pos	Team	Pld	W	D	L	GF	GA	GD	Pts	Promotion or relegation
1	Kalmar FF	26	15	9	2	54	23	+31	39	Promoted
2	Lunds BK	26	16	5	5	54	26	+28	37	
3	Kirsebergs IF, Malmö	26	14	7	5	47	29	+18	35	
4	Helsingborgs IF	26	13	8	5	72	36	+36	34	
5	IFK Värnamo	26	11	9	6	30	23	+7	31	
6	Waggeryds IK, Vaggeryd	26	10	8	8	43	37	+6	28	
7	BK Olympic, Malmö	26	10	8	8	43	41	+2	28	
8	Ramlösa BoIS	26	7	12	7	34	34	0	26	
9	Jönköping Södra IF	26	9	7	10	30	50	−20	25	
10	IK Tord, Jönköping	26	8	8	10	36	40	−4	24	
11	IFK Osby	26	6	7	13	31	43	−12	19	
12	IF Trion, Spjutsbygd	26	3	10	13	23	48	−25	16	Relegated
13	IS Halmia, Halmstad	26	4	7	15	30	56	−26	15	Relegated
14	Oskarshamns AIK	26	0	7	19	23	66	−43	7	Relegated
