= 1991 Division 2 (Swedish football) =

Swedish football league season

Statistics of Swedish football Division 2 for the 1991 season.

== Vårserier (Springseries) ==
=== Norra Norrland ===
Pos	Team	Pld	W	D	L	GF	GA	GD	Pts	Qualification
1	Umeå FC	14	12	0	2	44	10	+34	36	To Höstettan
2	Skellefteå AIK	14	10	1	3	40	12	+28	31	To Kvalettan
3	Alnö IF	14	7	4	3	23	15	+8	25	To Hösttvåan
4	Morön BK	14	6	2	6	23	27	−4	20	To Hösttvåan
5	FC Jönköping	14	5	2	7	14	29	−15	17	To Hösttvåan
6	IF Älgarna, Härnösand	14	4	1	9	16	28	−12	13	To Hösttvåan
7	Notvikens IK, Luleå	14	3	2	9	15	26	−11	11	To Hösttvåan
8	Sunnanå SK	14	2	2	10	11	39	−28	8	To Hösttvåan

=== Södra Norrland ===
Pos	Team	Pld	W	D	L	GF	GA	GD	Pts	Qualification
1	Sandvikens IF	14	8	3	3	23	14	+9	27	To Höstettan
2	Hudiksvalls ABK	14	6	4	4	24	19	+5	22	To Kvalettan
3	Ope IF	14	6	4	4	15	12	+3	22	To Hösttvåan
4	IFK Östersund	14	6	3	5	32	24	+8	21	To Hösttvåan
5	Ludvika FK	14	4	6	4	13	13	0	18	To Hösttvåan
6	Forssa BK, Borlänge	14	5	2	7	14	26	−12	17	To Hösttvåan
7	Sandvikens AIK FK	14	3	5	6	18	21	−3	14	To Hösttvåan
8	Kvarnsvedens IK	14	1	7	6	18	29	−11	10	To Hösttvåan

=== Östra Svealand ===
Pos	Team	Pld	W	D	L	GF	GA	GD	Pts	Qualification
1	Spånga IS	14	9	3	2	31	15	+16	30	To Höstettan
2	Södertälje FF	14	9	2	3	34	10	+24	29	To Kvalettan
3	Gimo IF	14	7	4	3	43	23	+20	25	To Hösttvåan
4	IFK Österåker FK, åkersberga	14	6	3	5	29	26	+3	21	To Hösttvåan
5	Älvsjö AIK	14	6	2	6	33	26	+7	20	To Hösttvåan
6	Tyresö FF	14	6	1	7	19	18	+1	19	To Hösttvåan
7	Assyriska Föreningen, Södertälje	14	3	4	7	30	45	−15	13	To Hösttvåan
8	FK Sumarice, Stockholm	14	0	1	13	6	62	−56	1	To Hösttvåan

=== Mellersta Svealand ===
Pos	Team	Pld	W	D	L	GF	GA	GD	Pts	Qualification
1	IK Sleipner, Norrköping	14	10	2	2	38	14	+24	32	To Höstettan
2	KB Karlskoga	14	9	3	2	26	12	+14	30	To Kvalettan
3	Västerås IK	14	6	3	5	19	23	−4	21	To Hösttvåan
4	Karlslunds IF, Örebro	14	5	5	4	19	16	+3	20	To Hösttvåan
5	IFK Västerås FK	14	5	2	7	21	28	−7	17	To Hösttvåan
6	IK City, Eskilstuna	14	4	4	6	16	20	−4	16	To Hösttvåan
7	Hertzöga BK, Karlstad	14	2	5	7	21	30	−9	11	To Hösttvåan
8	Nyköpings BIS	14	1	4	9	12	29	−17	7	To Hösttvåan

=== Östra Götaland ===
Pos	Team	Pld	W	D	L	GF	GA	GD	Pts	Qualification
1	Karlskrona AIF	14	11	2	1	49	12	+37	35	To Höstettan
2	Norrby IF, Borås	14	7	3	4	21	13	+8	24	To Kvalettan
3	Nybro IF	14	8	0	6	23	19	+4	24	To Hösttvåan
4	Gullringens GoIF	14	7	2	5	27	25	+2	23	To Hösttvåan
5	IFK Värnamo	14	7	1	6	17	17	0	22	To Hösttvåan
6	Grimsås IF	14	4	2	8	12	27	−15	14	To Hösttvåan
7	Waggeryds IK, Vaggeryd	14	3	3	8	19	33	−14	12	To Hösttvåan
8	Åtvidabergs FF	14	2	1	11	15	37	−22	7	To Hösttvåan

=== Mellersta Götaland ===
Pos	Team	Pld	W	D	L	GF	GA	GD	Pts	Qualification
1	Skövde AIK	14	10	3	1	37	18	+19	33	To Höstettan
2	IFK Uddevalla	14	8	5	1	38	16	+22	29	To Kvalettan
3	Tidaholms GIF	14	8	1	5	29	17	+12	25	To Hösttvåan
4	Lerums IS	14	6	2	6	19	23	−4	20	To Hösttvåan
5	Holmalunds IF, Alingsås	14	6	1	7	25	24	+1	19	To Hösttvåan
6	Ulvåkers IF	14	3	4	7	17	25	−8	13	To Hösttvåan
7	IFK Strömstad	14	4	1	9	17	37	−20	13	To Hösttvåan
8	IF Warta, Göteborg	14	2	1	11	15	37	−22	7	To Hösttvåan

=== Västra Götaland ===
Pos	Team	Pld	W	D	L	GF	GA	GD	Pts	Qualification
1	Falkenbergs FF	14	8	3	3	27	16	+11	27	To Höstettan
2	Åsa IF	14	7	6	1	21	14	+7	27	To Kvalettan
3	Kungsbacka BI	14	6	3	5	24	18	+6	21	To Hösttvåan
4	IF Norvalla, Väröbacka	14	6	3	5	19	17	+2	21	To Hösttvåan
5	BK Astrio, Halmstad	14	6	1	7	21	21	0	19	To Hösttvåan
6	Varbergs BoIS	14	5	4	5	21	23	−2	19	To Hösttvåan
7	IF Leikin, Halmstad	14	4	2	8	26	35	−9	14	To Hösttvåan
8	Askims IK	14	1	4	9	15	30	−15	7	To Hösttvåan

=== Södra Götaland ===
Pos	Team	Pld	W	D	L	GF	GA	GD	Pts	Qualification
1	Mjällby AIF	14	11	3	0	35	7	+28	36	To Höstettan
2	IFK Hässleholm	14	10	1	3	34	15	+19	31	To Kvalettan
3	Åhus Horna BK	14	7	3	4	18	12	+6	24	To Hösttvåan
4	Lunds BK	14	6	4	4	25	14	+11	22	To Hösttvåan
5	Yngsjö IF	14	5	2	7	17	24	−7	17	To Hösttvåan
6	Tomelilla IF	14	3	3	8	10	18	−8	12	To Hösttvåan
7	FBK Balkan, Malmö	14	3	3	8	11	23	−12	12	To Hösttvåan
8	BK Olympic, Malmö	14	1	1	12	4	41	−37	4	To Hösttvåan

== Höstserier (Autumnseries) ==
=== Kvalettan Norra ===
Pos	Team	Pld	W	D	L	GF	GA	GD	Pts
1	Gefle IF	10	6	2	2	21	12	+9	20
2	Hudiksvalls ABK	10	6	2	2	16	14	+2	20
3	IF Brommapojkarna	10	6	1	3	23	12	+11	19
4	KB Karlskoga	10	5	0	5	16	19	−3	15
5	Södertälje FF	10	3	0	7	16	20	−4	9
6	Skellefteå AIK	10	1	1	8	14	29	−15	4

=== Kvalettan Södra ===
Pos	Team	Pld	W	D	L	GF	GA	GD	Pts
1	IFK Hässleholm	10	8	1	1	44	12	+32	25
2	IFK Uddevalla	10	8	0	2	31	21	+10	24
3	Mjölby AI	10	4	1	5	22	33	−11	13
4	Åsa IF	10	3	1	6	26	29	−3	10
5	Norrby IF	10	3	0	7	12	28	−16	9
6	Kalmar AIK	10	2	1	7	17	29	−12	7

=== Hösttvåan Norrland ===
Pos	Team	Pld	W	D	L	GF	GA	GD	Pts	Qualification or relegation
1	IFK Östersund	14	10	3	1	37	15	+22	33	Playoff
2	Ope IF	14	9	1	4	32	16	+16	28	
3	Alnö IF	14	7	3	4	28	19	+9	24	
4	Morön BK	14	7	3	4	33	25	+8	24	
5	IF Älgarna, Härnösand	14	6	1	7	19	20	−1	19	
6	Notvikens IK, Luleå	14	5	2	7	17	29	−12	17	
7	Sunnanå SK	14	3	1	10	17	32	−15	10	Relegated
8	Sandvikens AIK FK	14	0	4	10	16	43	−27	4	Relegated

=== Östra Svealand ===
Pos	Team	Pld	W	D	L	GF	GA	GD	Pts	Qualification or relegation
1	Gimo IF	14	8	4	2	41	13	+28	28	Playoff
2	Älvsjö AIK	14	7	2	5	29	25	+4	23	
3	IFK Österåker FK, åkersberga	14	6	4	4	38	19	+19	22	
4	Nyköpings BIS	14	6	4	4	26	21	+5	22	
5	Assyriska Föreningen, Södertälje	14	5	6	3	33	26	+7	21	
6	Tyresö FF	14	5	5	4	33	21	+12	20	
7	Åtvidabergs FF	14	6	1	7	32	21	+11	19	Relegated
8	FK Sumarice, Stockholm	14	0	0	14	5	91	−86	0	Relegated

=== Västra Svealand ===
Pos	Team	Pld	W	D	L	GF	GA	GD	Pts	Qualification or relegation
1	Hertzöga BK, Karlstad	14	9	3	2	24	16	+8	30	Playoff
2	Karlslunds IF, Örebro	14	7	3	4	26	18	+8	24	
3	IK City, Eskilstuna	14	7	1	6	25	20	+5	22	
4	Forssa BK, Borlänge	14	6	2	6	28	21	+7	20	
5	IFK Västerås FK	14	6	2	6	26	23	+3	20	
6	Ludvika FK	14	5	5	4	17	15	+2	20	
7	Västerås IK	14	5	1	8	15	23	−8	16	Relegated
8	Kvarnsvedens IK	14	2	1	11	14	39	−25	7	Relegated

=== Mellersta Götaland ===
Pos	Team	Pld	W	D	L	GF	GA	GD	Pts	Qualification or relegation
1	Tidaholms GIF	14	9	5	0	36	16	+20	32	Playoff
2	IFK Värnamo	14	8	5	1	27	7	+20	29	
3	Nybro IF	14	7	4	3	30	16	+14	25	
4	FC Jönköping	14	6	3	5	18	24	−6	21	
5	Gullringens GoIF	14	5	3	6	27	23	+4	18	
6	Ulvåkers IF	14	2	7	5	19	22	−3	13	
7	Grimsås IF	14	2	7	5	17	29	−12	13	Relegated
8	Waggeryds IK, Vaggeryd	14	0	0	14	6	43	−37	0	Relegated

=== Västra Götaland ===
Pos	Team	Pld	W	D	L	GF	GA	GD	Pts	Qualification or relegation
1	Kungsbacka BI	14	10	1	3	27	12	+15	31	Playoff
2	Holmalunds IF, Alingsås	14	7	4	3	33	20	+13	25	
3	Varbergs BoIS	14	7	3	4	26	20	+6	24	
4	IFK Strömstad	14	6	3	5	23	25	−2	21	
5	Askims IK	14	5	3	6	25	20	+5	18	
6	IF Norvalla, Väröbacka	14	3	6	5	18	25	−7	15	
7	Lerums IS	14	4	1	9	15	32	−17	13	Relegated
8	IF Warta, Göteborg	14	3	1	10	13	26	−13	10	Relegated

=== Södra Götaland ===
Pos	Team	Pld	W	D	L	GF	GA	GD	Pts	Qualification or relegation
1	F Leikin, Halmstad	14	9	2	3	37	15	+22	29	Playoff
2	Tomelilla IF	14	9	1	4	25	14	+11	28	
3	Lunds BK	14	8	3	3	23	15	+8	27	
4	BK Astrio, Halmstad	14	6	4	4	38	23	+15	22	
5	Åhus Horna BK	14	7	1	6	23	19	+4	22	
6	Yngsjö IF	14	5	3	6	21	28	−7	18	
7	FBK Balkan, Malmö	14	1	4	9	22	38	−16	7	Relegated
8	BK Olympic, Malmö	14	1	2	11	16	53	−37	5	Relegated
