= 1990 Division 2 (Swedish football) =

Swedish football league season

Statistics of the Swedish football Division 2 for the 1990 season.

== League standings ==
=== Division 2 Norra ===
Pos	Team	Pld	W	D	L	GF	GA	GD	Pts	Promotion or relegation
1	IFK Sundsvall (P)	26	19	5	2	68	18	+50	62	Promotion to Division 1
2	IK Sirius	26	19	5	2	71	22	+49	62	Promotion Playoffs
3	IFK Östersund	26	14	7	5	53	32	+21	49	
4	Umeå FC	26	12	6	8	50	32	+18	42	
5	Sandvikens IF	26	13	1	12	44	38	+6	40	
6	Morön	26	11	4	11	39	38	+1	37	
7	Hudiksvall	26	9	7	10	36	34	+2	34	
8	Forssa	26	6	11	9	27	49	−22	29	
9	Kvarnsveden	26	7	8	11	32	55	−23	29	
10	Ope IF	26	6	9	11	23	27	−4	27	
11	Skellefteå AIK	26	5	11	10	27	35	−8	26	
12	Örnsköldsvik (R)	26	7	2	17	29	62	−33	23	Relegation to Division 3
13	Gimonäs (R)	26	5	7	14	28	56	−28	22	Relegation to Division 3
14	IFK Mora (R)	26	4	7	15	23	62	−39	19	Relegation to Division 3

Rules for classification: 1) points; 2) goal difference; 3) number of goals scored.
(P) Promoted; (R) Relegated

=== Division 2 Östra ===
Pos	Team	Pld	W	D	L	GF	GA	GD	Pts	Promotion or relegation
1	Mjölby (P)	26	12	10	4	47	28	+19	46	Promotion to Division 1
2	Enköpings SK	26	13	6	7	47	26	+21	45	Promotion Playoffs
3	Nyköpings BIS	26	12	6	8	38	30	+8	42	
4	IFK Västerås	26	11	8	7	45	32	+13	41	
5	Karlslunds IF	26	12	5	9	33	30	+3	41	
6	Spånga	26	10	7	9	32	39	−7	37	
7	City	26	10	6	10	35	42	−7	36	
8	IK Sleipner	26	10	4	12	51	47	+4	34	
9	Södertälje FF	26	9	7	10	27	25	+2	34	
10	Åtvidabergs FF	26	9	6	11	54	42	+12	33	
11	Älvsjö	26	9	6	11	32	42	−10	33	
12	Linköping (R)	26	8	4	14	36	59	−23	28	Relegation to Division 3
13	Film (R)	26	8	3	15	19	43	−24	27	Relegation to Division 3
14	Visby IF Gute (R)	26	6	8	12	27	38	−11	26	Relegation to Division 3

Rules for classification: 1) points; 2) goal difference; 3) number of goals scored.
(P) Promoted; (R) Relegated

=== Division 2 Västra ===
Pos	Team	Pld	W	D	L	GF	GA	GD	Pts	Promotion or relegation
1	Degerfors IF (P)	26	17	7	2	56	17	+39	58	Promotion to Division 1
2	Skövde AIK	26	17	6	3	65	29	+36	57	Promotion Playoffs
3	Tidaholms GIF	26	14	7	5	47	30	+17	49	
4	Åsa	26	9	9	8	33	34	−1	36	
5	KB Karlskoga	26	9	7	10	26	31	−5	34	
6	Norrby IF	26	10	3	13	35	41	−6	33	
7	IFK Uddevalla	26	7	11	8	39	49	−10	32	
8	Holmalunds IF	26	9	4	13	49	49	0	31	
9	Warta	26	7	10	9	34	41	−7	31	
10	IFK Strömstad	26	8	7	11	28	39	−11	31	
11	Grimsås	26	8	6	12	39	55	−16	30	
12	Säffle (R)	26	8	5	13	35	45	−10	29	Relegation to Division 3
13	Norrstrand (R)	26	7	5	14	25	36	−11	26	Relegation to Division 3
14	Karlstad BK (R)	26	6	5	15	27	52	−25	23	Relegation to Division 3

Rules for classification: 1) points; 2) goal difference; 3) number of goals scored.
(P) Promoted; (R) Relegated

=== Division 2 Södra ===
Pos	Team	Pld	W	D	L	GF	GA	GD	Pts	Promotion or relegation
1	Myresjö IF (P)	26	16	6	4	55	28	+27	54	Promotion to Division 1
2	Varbergs BoIS	26	15	6	5	36	28	+8	51	Promotion Playoffs
3	IFK Hässleholm	26	15	5	6	58	32	+26	50	
4	Falkenbergs FF	26	14	5	7	50	27	+23	47	
5	IFK Värnamo	26	13	5	8	43	28	+15	44	
6	IF Leikin	26	10	5	11	50	47	+3	35	
7	Nybro IF	26	8	7	11	25	24	+1	31	
8	Olympic	26	6	12	8	29	35	−6	30	
9	Lunds BK	26	7	8	11	26	28	−2	29	
10	Tomelilla	26	6	11	9	22	30	−8	29	
11	Waggeryd	26	9	2	15	27	63	−36	29	
12	Kirseberg (R)	26	7	7	12	25	30	−5	28	Relegation to Division 3
13	Ifö/Bromölla (R)	26	7	6	13	20	39	−19	27	Relegation to Division 3
14	Croatia (R)	26	4	5	17	25	63	−38	17	Relegation to Division 3

Rules for classification: 1) points; 2) goal difference; 3) number of goals scored.
(P) Promoted; (R) Relegated
