= 1992 Division 2 (Swedish football) =

Swedish football league season

Statistics of Swedish football Division 2 for the 1992 season.

== Vårserier (Springseries) ==
=== Norra Norrland ===
Pos	Team	Pld	W	D	L	GF	GA	GD	Pts	Qualification
1	Umeå FC	14	8	5	1	23	7	+16	29	To Höstettan
2	Skellefteå AIK	14	7	3	4	18	14	+4	24	To Kvalettan
3	Alnö IF	14	6	5	3	23	17	+6	23	To Hösttvåan
4	Notvikens IK, Luleå	14	7	2	5	19	14	+5	23	To Hösttvåan
5	Morön BK	14	5	4	5	16	14	+2	19	To Hösttvåan
6	Täfteå IK	14	4	5	5	12	16	−4	17	To Hösttvåan
7	Gimonäs CK	14	3	3	8	17	22	−5	12	To Hösttvåan
8	IF Älgarna, Härnösand	14	1	3	10	10	34	−24	6	To Hösttrean

=== Södra Norrland ===
Pos	Team	Pld	W	D	L	GF	GA	GD	Pts	Qualification
1	Gimo IF	14	8	4	2	29	14	+15	28	To Höstettan
2	IFK Östersund	14	7	5	2	20	12	+8	26	To Kvalettan
3	Sandvikens IF	14	4	7	3	22	19	+3	19	To Hösttvåan
4	Ope IF	14	4	6	4	23	19	+4	18	To Hösttvåan
5	Ludvika FK	14	3	6	5	12	16	−4	15	To Hösttvåan
6	Hudiksvalls ABK	14	4	3	7	17	33	−16	15	To Hösttvåan
7	Forssa BK, Borlänge	14	4	2	8	18	19	−1	14	To Hösttvåan
8	Avesta AIK	14	3	5	6	22	31	−9	14	To Hösttrean

=== Östra Svealand ===
Pos	Team	Pld	W	D	L	GF	GA	GD	Pts	Qualification
1	IF Brommapojkarna, Bromma	14	10	1	3	35	11	+24	31	To Höstettan
2	Assyriska Föreningen, Södertälje	14	8	4	2	28	13	+15	28	To Kvalettan
3	Älvsjö AIK	14	5	2	7	25	28	−3	17	To Hösttvåan
4	Visby IF Gute	14	4	4	6	18	24	−6	16	To Hösttvåan
5	Södertälje FF	14	3	6	5	18	18	0	15	To Hösttvåan
6	Tyresö FF	14	3	6	5	17	20	−3	15	To Hösttvåan
7	IFK Österåker FK, åkersberga	14	3	6	5	18	28	−10	15	To Hösttvåan
8	Nyköpings BIS	14	3	5	6	16	33	−17	14	To Hösttrean

=== Mellersta Svealand ===
Pos	Team	Pld	W	D	L	GF	GA	GD	Pts	Qualification
1	Hertzöga BK, Karlstad	14	9	1	4	39	18	+21	28	To Höstettan
2	Västerås SK FK	14	8	3	3	23	14	+9	27	To Kvalettan
3	IFK Västerås FK	14	8	2	4	27	16	+11	26	To Hösttvåan
4	KB Karlskoga	14	6	3	5	25	20	+5	21	To Hösttvåan
5	Karlslunds IF, Örebro	14	5	4	5	23	22	+1	19	To Hösttvåan
6	Syrianska Föreningen, Södertälje	14	5	1	8	15	38	−23	16	To Hösttvåan
7	Karlstads BK	14	4	0	10	18	35	−17	12	To Hösttvåan
8	IK City, Eskilstuna	14	1	6	7	21	28	−7	9	To Hösttrean

=== Östra Götaland ===
Pos	Team	Pld	W	D	L	GF	GA	GD	Pts	Qualification
1	IK Sleipner, Norrköping	14	10	2	2	30	20	+10	32	To Höstettan
2	Nybro IF	14	7	4	3	23	13	+10	25	To Kvalettan
3	Kalmar AIK	14	7	4	3	24	15	+9	25	To Hösttvåan
4	Nässjö FF	14	4	7	3	16	15	+1	19	To Hösttvåan
5	Växjö BK	14	4	4	6	18	23	−5	16	To Hösttvåan
6	IFK Värnamo	14	3	6	5	25	27	−2	15	To Hösttvåan
7	Gullringens GoIF	14	3	4	7	18	26	−8	13	To Hösttvåan
8	Mjölby AI	14	1	3	10	6	21	−15	6	To Hösttrean

=== Mellersta Götaland ===
Pos	Team	Pld	W	D	L	GF	GA	GD	Pts	Qualification
1	Örgryte IS, Göteborg	14	12	1	1	31	8	+23	37	To Höstettan
2	IFK Uddevalla	14	7	4	3	21	15	+6	25	To Kvalettan
3	Mölnlycke IF	14	5	3	6	20	18	+2	18	To Hösttvåan
4	Bjurslätts IF, Hisingen	14	4	5	5	19	24	−5	17	To Hösttvåan
5	Askims IK	14	3	5	6	16	21	−5	14	To Hösttvåan
6	IFK Strömstad	14	3	5	6	9	15	−6	14	To Hösttvåan
7	Holmalunds IF, Alingsås	14	3	5	6	16	23	−7	14	To Hösttvåan
8	Ulvåkers IF	14	2	6	6	10	18	−8	12	To Hösttrean

=== Västra Götaland ===
Pos	Team	Pld	W	D	L	GF	GA	GD	Pts	Qualification
1	Jonsereds IF	14	8	3	3	21	11	+10	27	To Höstettan
2	Norrby IF, Borås	14	7	3	4	19	11	+8	24	To Kvalettan
3	Husqvarna FF	14	6	5	3	28	16	+12	23	To Hösttvåan
4	FC Jönköping	14	5	3	6	12	19	−7	18	To Hösttvåan
5	Varbergs BoIS	14	5	2	7	18	21	−3	17	To Hösttvåan
6	Åsa IF	14	5	2	7	16	22	−6	17	To Hösttvåan
7	IF Norvalla, Väröbacka	14	4	3	7	11	20	−9	15	To Hösttvåan
8	Kungsbacka BI	14	2	7	5	10	15	−5	13	To Hösttrean

=== Södra Götaland ===
Pos	Team	Pld	W	D	L	GF	GA	GD	Pts	Qualification
1	Markaryds IF	14	9	3	2	23	11	+12	30	To Höstettan
2	Lunds BK	14	7	2	5	24	18	+6	23	To Kvalettan
3	IFK Trelleborg	14	5	6	3	27	17	+10	21	To Hösttvåan
4	Falkenbergs FF	14	6	2	6	17	26	−9	20	To Hösttvåan
5	Tomelilla IF	14	6	1	7	19	21	−2	19	To Hösttvåan
6	Åhus Horna BK	14	5	3	6	22	23	−1	18	To Hösttvåan
7	BK Astrio, Halmstad	14	3	4	7	18	22	−4	13	To Hösttvåan
8	Yngsjö IF	14	3	3	8	11	23	−12	12	To Hösttrean

== Höstserier (Autumnseries) ==
=== Kvalettan Norra ===
Pos	Team	Pld	W	D	L	GF	GA	GD	Pts
1	Assyriska Föreningen	10	8	0	2	22	7	+15	24
2	Enköpings SK	10	6	0	4	9	11	−2	18
3	Västerås SK	10	5	2	3	16	8	+8	17
4	Väsby IK	10	5	2	3	16	12	+4	17
5	IFK Östersund	10	2	1	7	6	16	−10	7
6	Skellefteå AIK	10	1	1	8	1	16	−15	4

=== Kvalettan Södra ===
Pos	Team	Pld	W	D	L	GF	GA	GD	Pts
1	Lunds BK	10	6	3	1	15	5	+10	21
2	IFK Uddevalla	10	5	2	3	22	15	+7	17
3	IF Leikin	10	5	1	4	20	20	0	16
4	Motala AIF	10	3	2	5	13	15	−2	11
5	Norrby IF	10	3	1	6	15	22	−7	10
6	Nybro IF	10	3	1	6	10	18	−8	10

=== Hösttvåan Norrland ===
Pos	Team	Pld	W	D	L	GF	GA	GD	Pts	Qualification or relegation
1	Ope IF	14	9	1	4	28	19	+9	28	Playoff
2	Alnö IF	14	8	1	5	34	24	+10	25	
3	Delsbo IF	14	5	6	3	20	17	+3	21	
4	Morön BK	14	5	4	5	18	16	+2	19	
5	Notvikens IK, Luleå	14	4	5	5	15	17	−2	17	
6	Piteå IF	14	5	2	7	15	22	−7	17	
7	Täfteå IK	14	4	4	6	15	19	−4	16	Relegated
8	Gimonäs CK	14	3	3	8	15	26	−11	12	Relegated

=== Östra Svealand ===
Pos	Team	Pld	W	D	L	GF	GA	GD	Pts	Qualification or relegation
1	Skiljebo SK, Västerås	14	8	4	2	34	18	+16	28	Playoff
2	Visby IF Gute	14	7	3	4	27	23	+4	24	
3	Älvsjö AIK	14	6	6	2	32	17	+15	24	
4	Södertälje FF	14	6	4	4	26	19	+7	22	
5	IFK Västerås FK	14	4	4	6	22	24	−2	16	
6	Syrianska Föreningen, Södertälje	14	4	3	7	18	31	−13	15	
7	IFK Österåker FK, åkersberga	14	2	5	7	15	27	−12	11	Relegated
8	Tyresö FF	14	1	7	6	8	22	−14	10	Relegated

=== Västra Svealand ===
Pos	Team	Pld	W	D	L	GF	GA	GD	Pts	Qualification or relegation
1	Karlslunds IF, Örebro	14	8	4	2	28	10	+18	28	Playoff
2	Ludvika FK	14	8	2	4	18	12	+6	26	
3	Norrstrands IF, Karlstad	14	5	6	3	14	14	0	21	
4	KB Karlskoga	14	5	4	5	25	24	+1	19	
5	Karlstads BK	14	4	5	5	17	18	−1	17	
6	Hudiksvalls ABK	14	4	3	7	17	22	−5	15	
7	Forssa BK, Borlänge	14	4	2	8	14	20	−6	14	Relegated
8	Sandvikens IF	14	4	2	8	17	30	−13	14	Relegated

=== Östra Götaland ===
Pos	Team	Pld	W	D	L	GF	GA	GD	Pts	Qualification or relegation
1	IFK Värnamo	14	10	0	4	23	12	+11	30	Playoff
2	Gullringens GoIF	14	9	0	5	34	24	+10	27	
3	Kalmar AIK	14	6	4	4	23	19	+4	22	
4	Växjö BK	14	6	4	4	22	19	+3	22	
5	Nässjö FF	14	5	3	6	28	25	+3	18	
6	Grimsås IF	14	4	3	7	26	35	−9	15	
7	Ljungby IF	14	3	4	7	25	37	−12	13	Relegated
8	Asarums IF FK	14	3	2	9	15	25	−10	11	Relegated

=== Västra Götaland ===
Pos	Team	Pld	W	D	L	GF	GA	GD	Pts	Qualification or relegation
1	Melleruds IF	14	8	4	2	30	16	+14	28	Playoff
2	Bjurslätts IF, Hisingen	14	7	3	4	23	16	+7	24	
3	Holmalunds IF, Alingsås	14	6	2	6	22	16	+6	20	
4	Husqvarna FF	14	5	4	5	25	26	−1	19	
5	IFK Strömstad	14	3	9	2	23	18	+5	18	
6	Askims IK	14	4	4	6	16	19	−3	16	
7	FC Jönköping	14	4	3	7	16	31	−15	15	Relegated
8	Mölnlycke IF	14	3	3	8	13	24	−11	12	Relegated

=== Södra Götaland ===
Pos	Team	Pld	W	D	L	GF	GA	GD	Pts	Qualification or relegation
1	IFK Trelleborg	14	7	4	3	18	12	+6	25	Playoff
2	åhus Horna BK	14	6	3	5	26	17	+9	21	
3	BK Astrio, Halmstad	14	6	2	6	14	14	0	20	
3	Tomelilla IF	14	6	2	6	14	14	0	20	
5	Varbergs BoIS	14	5	4	5	28	26	+2	19	
6	Falkenbergs FF	14	5	4	5	16	19	−3	19	
7	Åsa IF	14	3	7	4	15	18	−3	16	Relegated
8	IF Norvalla, Väröbacka	14	4	2	8	17	28	−11	14	Relegated
