= 1987 Division 2 (Swedish football) =

Swedish football league season

Statistics of Swedish football Division 2 for the 1987 season.

== League standings ==
=== Norra ===
Pos	Team	Pld	W	D	L	GF	GA	GD	Pts	Promotion or relegation
1	IFK Holmsund	26	17	6	3	70	28	+42	40	Promoted
2	Tegs SK, Umeå	26	13	11	2	46	25	+21	37	
3	Falu BS, Falun	26	14	6	6	40	20	+20	34	
4	Forssa BK, Borlänge	26	12	7	7	37	30	+7	31	
5	Kiruna FF	26	11	7	8	46	30	+16	29	
6	Hudiksvalls ABK	26	10	8	8	35	30	+5	28	
7	Sandåkerns SK, Umeå	26	11	5	10	33	38	−5	27	
8	Gimonäs CK	26	8	9	9	43	39	+4	25	
9	IFK Sundsvall	26	8	7	11	35	46	−11	23	
10	IF Friska Viljor, Örnsköldsvik	26	7	8	11	30	35	−5	22	
11	IFK Kalix	26	8	5	13	35	50	−15	21	
12	Kvarnsvedens IK	26	6	7	13	32	55	−23	19	Relegated
13	Ope IF	26	5	7	14	33	50	−17	17	Relegated
14	Kubikenborgs IF, Sundsvall	26	3	5	18	24	63	−39	11	Relegated

=== Mellersta ===
Pos	Team	Pld	W	D	L	GF	GA	GD	Pts	Promotion or relegation
1	Väsby IK, Upplands-Väsby	26	15	7	4	56	27	+29	37	Promoted
2	Stockholms Spårvägars GoIF	26	13	9	4	40	26	+14	35	
3	Spånga IS	26	13	7	6	46	28	+18	33	
4	Tyresö FF	26	14	4	8	63	42	+21	32	
5	Älvsjö AIK	26	11	9	6	54	30	+24	31	
6	Enköpings SK	26	11	9	6	44	28	+16	31	
7	Sandvikens IF	26	12	5	9	44	38	+6	29	
8	IF Verdandi, Eskilstuna	26	12	3	11	49	52	−3	27	
9	Films SK	26	9	8	9	43	44	−1	26	
10	Ludvika FK	26	6	8	12	36	52	−16	20	
11	Karlslunds IF, Örebro	26	6	7	13	26	44	−18	19	
12	Gimo IF	26	5	6	15	36	53	−17	16	Relegated
13	Rynninge IK, Örebro	26	6	4	16	31	62	−31	16	Relegated
14	Sundbybergs IK	26	4	4	18	24	66	−42	12	Relegated

=== Västra ===
Pos	Team	Pld	W	D	L	GF	GA	GD	Pts	Promotion or relegation
1	Falkenbergs FF	26	14	8	4	46	26	+20	36	Promoted
2	IFK Strömstad	26	13	6	7	42	34	+8	32	
3	Holmalunds IF, Alingsås	26	12	8	6	41	36	+5	32	
4	Helsingborgs IF	26	13	5	8	45	23	+22	31	
5	Jonsereds IF	26	11	8	7	43	28	+15	30	
6	Norrby IF, Borås	26	11	6	9	42	39	+3	28	
7	IS Halmia, Halmstad	26	8	10	8	41	33	+8	26	
8	Trollhättans FK	26	9	8	9	25	31	−6	26	
9	Varbergs BoIS	26	9	7	10	34	39	−5	25	
10	Åsa IF	26	9	6	11	42	39	+3	24	
11	Gunnilse IS, Angered	26	10	4	12	40	43	−3	24	
12	Hittarps IK	26	5	9	12	39	53	−14	19	Relegated
13	Grimsås IF	26	5	7	14	27	49	−22	17	Relegated
14	IF Warta, Göteborg	26	4	6	16	23	55	−32	14	Relegated

=== Östra ===
Pos	Team	Pld	W	D	L	GF	GA	GD	Pts	Promotion or relegation
1	Markaryds IF	26	16	8	2	48	20	+28	40	Promoted
2	Nyköpings BIS	26	14	7	5	40	20	+20	35	
3	Motala AIF	26	13	6	7	50	29	+21	32	
4	Lunds BK	26	12	7	7	58	41	+17	31	
5	IK Tord, Jönköping	26	10	7	9	41	43	−2	27	
6	IF Trion, Rödeby	26	9	8	9	32	39	−7	26	
7	Oskarshamns AIK	26	9	8	9	35	54	−19	26	
8	BK Olympic, Malmö	26	10	5	11	44	46	−2	25	
9	Jönköping Södra IF	26	7	10	9	34	29	+5	24	
10	Kirsebergs IF	26	9	6	11	45	42	+3	24	
11	Linköpings FF	26	9	5	12	45	52	−7	23	
12	IFK Malmö	26	6	7	13	30	47	−17	19	Relegated
13	Gullringens GoIF	26	7	3	16	34	37	−3	17	Relegated
14	Mönsterås GIF	26	6	3	17	27	64	−37	15	Relegated
