= 1989 Division 2 (Swedish football) =

Swedish football league season

Statistics of Swedish football Division 2 for the 1989 season.

== League standings ==
=== Norra ===
Pos	Team	Pld	W	D	L	GF	GA	GD	Pts	Promotion or relegation
1	Spårvågens GoIF, Stockholm	26	22	2	2	90	13	+77	46	Promoted
2	IFK Östersund	26	17	1	8	58	29	+29	35	
3	Skellefteå AIK	26	14	5	7	59	42	+17	33	
4	Älvsjö AIK	26	13	4	9	52	46	+6	30	
5	Umeå FC	26	11	6	9	44	35	+9	28	
6	Gimonäs CK	26	12	2	12	40	40	0	26	
7	Hudiksvalls ABK	26	6	11	9	31	36	−5	23	
8	Spånga IS	26	10	3	13	32	47	−15	23	
9	Örnsköldsviks FF	26	8	7	11	33	49	−16	23	
10	Ope IF	26	9	4	13	24	33	−9	22	
11	IFK Mora	26	8	6	12	26	48	−22	22	
12	Älvsby IF	26	10	1	15	35	43	−8	21	Relegated
13	Bodens BK	26	7	3	16	25	50	−25	17	Relegated
14	Delsbo IF	26	6	3	17	24	62	−38	15	Relegated

=== Östra ===
Pos	Team	Pld	W	D	L	GF	GA	GD	Pts	Promotion or relegation
1	Tyresö FF	26	13	10	3	52	26	+26	36	Promoted
2	IK Sleipner, Norrköping	26	14	6	6	69	34	+35	34	
3	Sandvikens IF	26	13	8	5	49	26	+23	34	
4	Nyköpings BIS	26	14	6	6	48	30	+18	34	
5	Södertälje FF	26	12	8	6	41	35	+6	32	
6	Visby IF Gute	26	10	7	9	46	40	+6	27	
7	Enköpings SK	26	7	10	9	38	34	+4	24	
8	IFK Västerås	26	8	8	10	43	41	+2	24	
9	Linköpings FF	26	9	6	11	38	38	0	24	
10	Forssa BK, Borlänge	26	9	6	11	32	37	−5	24	
11	Films SK	26	8	7	11	30	43	−13	23	
12	Huddinge IF	26	6	7	13	32	51	−19	19	Relegated
13	Råsunda IS, Solna	24	5	6	13	38	62	−24	16	Relegated
14	Falu BS, Falun	26	2	9	15	15	74	−59	13	Relegated

=== Västra ===
Pos	Team	Pld	W	D	L	GF	GA	GD	Pts	Promotion or relegation
1	Gunnilse IS, Angered	26	15	7	4	57	22	+35	37	Promoted
2	Tidaholms GIF	26	12	10	4	51	34	+17	34	
3	Holmalunds IF, Alingsås	26	12	7	7	52	31	+21	31	
4	IFK Strömstad	26	12	6	8	43	29	+14	30	
5	Degerfors IF	26	9	12	5	35	33	+2	30	
6	Karlslunds IF, Örebro	26	12	5	9	35	32	+3	29	
7	Norrby IF, Borås	26	6	14	6	38	37	+1	26	
8	Skövde AIK	26	10	6	10	44	46	−2	26	
9	Norrstrands IF, Karlstad	26	8	8	10	27	43	−16	24	
10	Säffle FF	26	8	7	11	32	47	−15	23	
11	IF Warta, Göteborg	26	7	8	11	25	31	−6	22	
12	Jönköping Södra IF	26	7	8	11	30	39	−9	22	Relegated
13	IK Tord, Jönköping	26	5	8	13	36	48	−12	18	Relegated
14	Huskvarna FF	26	3	6	17	28	59	−31	12	Relegated

=== Södra ===
Pos	Team	Pld	W	D	L	GF	GA	GD	Pts	Promotion or relegation
1	Helsingborgs IF	26	22	0	4	87	31	+56	44	Promoted
2	Lunds BK	26	15	6	5	66	33	+33	36	
3	Åsa IF	26	11	10	5	40	32	+8	32	
4	IFK Värnamo	26	11	9	6	34	25	+9	31	
5	Kirsebergs IF, Malmö	26	11	5	10	42	48	−6	27	
6	Myresjö IF	26	10	6	10	54	38	+16	26	
7	IFK Hässleholm	26	9	6	11	46	46	0	24	
8	BK Olympic, Malmö	26	10	4	12	43	44	−1	24	
9	NK Croatia, Malmö	26	8	5	13	36	45	−9	21	
10	IF Leikin, Halmstad	26	8	5	13	45	64	−19	21	
11	Waggeryds IK, Vaggeryd	26	8	5	13	37	60	−23	21	
12	Ramlösa BoIS	26	6	9	11	29	52	−23	21	Relegated
13	IFK Osby	26	7	5	14	26	58	−32	19	Relegated
14	Färjestadens GIF	26	5	7	14	34	43	−9	17	Relegated
