= 1946–47 Division 3 (Swedish football) =

Swedish League Division 3
- Season: 1946–47
- Champions: Ljusne AIK; Brynäs IF; Falu BS; Sundbybergs IK; IF Vesta; IF Verdandi; IFK Munkfors; IFK Åmål; BK Kenty; Huskvarna Södra IS; Hvetlanda GIF; Ronneby BK; Norrbygärde IF; Jonsereds IF; Falkenbergs FF; Råå IF
- Promoted: 0 teams
- Relegated: 136 teams

Statistics of Swedish football Division 3 for the 1946–47 season. At the end of this season major re-structuring of the Swedish third tier took place with the number of divisions reduced from 16 sections to 4 sections. There were no promotions to Division 2 and most of the third tier teams were relegated to Division 4 for the 1947-48 season.

== League standings ==
=== Uppsvenska Sydöstra 1946–47 ===
The league table is not currently available but it is known that Ljusne AIK won the division and Strands IF qualified for the relegation playoffs.

=== Uppsvenska Östra 1946–47 ===
| Pos | Team | Pld | W | D | L | GF | GA | GD | Pts | Relegation |
|---|---|---|---|---|---|---|---|---|---|---|
| 1 | Brynäs IF, Gävle | 18 | 12 | 4 | 2 | 64 | 28 | +36 | 28 | |
| 2 | Hofors AIF | 18 | 12 | 2 | 4 | 58 | 20 | +38 | 26 | Relegation Playoffs - Relegated |
| 3 | Skutskärs IF | 18 | 10 | 4 | 4 | 48 | 28 | +20 | 24 | Relegated |
| 4 | Valbo AIF | 18 | 6 | 6 | 6 | 42 | 38 | +4 | 18 | Relegated |
| 5 | Gefle IF, Gävle | 18 | 7 | 3 | 8 | 41 | 44 | −3 | 17 | Relegated |
| 6 | Forsbacka IK | 18 | 8 | 1 | 9 | 33 | 42 | −9 | 17 | Relegated |
| 7 | Högbo AIK | 18 | 6 | 4 | 8 | 26 | 32 | −6 | 16 | Relegated |
| 8 | IFK Gävle | 18 | 4 | 4 | 10 | 21 | 37 | −16 | 12 | Relegated |
| 9 | Örbyhus IF | 18 | 5 | 2 | 11 | 28 | 52 | −24 | 12 | Relegated |
| 10 | IK Huge, Gävle | 18 | 3 | 4 | 11 | 22 | 62 | −40 | 10 | Relegated |

=== Uppsvenska Västra 1946–47 ===
| Pos | Team | Pld | W | D | L | GF | GA | GD | Pts | Relegation |
|---|---|---|---|---|---|---|---|---|---|---|
| 1 | Falu BS, Falun | 18 | 13 | 2 | 3 | 53 | 28 | +25 | 28 | |
| 2 | IK Heros, Smedjebacken | 18 | 10 | 5 | 3 | 56 | 25 | +31 | 25 | Relegation Playoffs - Relegated |
| 3 | IFK Mora | 18 | 10 | 4 | 4 | 49 | 26 | +23 | 24 | Relegated |
| 4 | Malungs IF | 18 | 10 | 3 | 5 | 38 | 29 | +9 | 23 | Relegated |
| 5 | Leksands IF | 18 | 11 | 0 | 7 | 59 | 41 | +18 | 22 | Relegated |
| 6 | Forssa BK | 18 | 9 | 1 | 8 | 39 | 36 | +3 | 19 | Relegated |
| 7 | Sollerö IF | 18 | 4 | 4 | 10 | 35 | 48 | −13 | 12 | Relegated |
| 8 | Långshyttans AIK | 18 | 5 | 2 | 11 | 31 | 56 | −25 | 12 | Relegated |
| 9 | Islingby IK | 18 | 4 | 2 | 12 | 31 | 43 | −12 | 10 | Relegated |
| 10 | IFK Hedemora | 18 | 1 | 3 | 14 | 17 | 76 | −59 | 5 | Relegated |

=== Östsvenska 1946–47 ===
| Pos | Team | Pld | W | D | L | GF | GA | GD | Pts | Relegation |
|---|---|---|---|---|---|---|---|---|---|---|
| 1 | Sundbybergs IK | 18 | 12 | 2 | 4 | 64 | 32 | +32 | 26 | |
| 2 | Hagalunds IS, Solna | 18 | 11 | 4 | 3 | 55 | 37 | +18 | 26 | Relegation Playoffs - Relegated |
| 3 | Mälarhöjdens IK | 18 | 9 | 4 | 5 | 40 | 31 | +9 | 22 | Relegated |
| 4 | Spånga IS | 18 | 10 | 2 | 6 | 38 | 31 | +7 | 22 | Relegated |
| 5 | Värtans IK, Stockholm | 18 | 9 | 2 | 7 | 45 | 29 | +16 | 20 | Relegated |
| 6 | Årsta SK, Stockholm | 18 | 7 | 5 | 6 | 31 | 28 | +3 | 19 | Relegated |
| 7 | Nynäshamns IF | 18 | 6 | 2 | 10 | 40 | 48 | −8 | 14 | Relegated |
| 8 | IK Sture, Stockholm | 18 | 4 | 5 | 9 | 48 | 57 | −9 | 13 | Relegated |
| 9 | IK Ome, Stockholm | 18 | 5 | 3 | 10 | 29 | 44 | −15 | 13 | Relegated |
| 10 | Karlbergs BK, Stockholm | 18 | 0 | 5 | 13 | 23 | 76 | −53 | 5 | Relegated |

=== Centralserien Norra 1946–47 ===
| Pos | Team | Pld | W | D | L | GF | GA | GD | Pts | Qualification or relegation |
|---|---|---|---|---|---|---|---|---|---|---|
| 1 | IF Vesta, Uppsala | 16 | 10 | 3 | 3 | 45 | 15 | +30 | 23 | |
| 2 | Hallstahammars SK | 16 | 10 | 3 | 3 | 35 | 15 | +20 | 23 | Relegation Playoffs |
| 3 | Västerås SK | 16 | 9 | 4 | 3 | 46 | 26 | +20 | 22 | Relegated |
| 4 | IK Sirius, Uppsala | 16 | 10 | 2 | 4 | 39 | 26 | +13 | 22 | Relegated |
| 5 | Kolsva IF | 16 | 7 | 4 | 5 | 22 | 27 | −5 | 18 | Relegated |
| 6 | Fagersta AIK | 16 | 5 | 1 | 10 | 22 | 33 | −11 | 11 | Relegated |
| 7 | Väsby IK, Upplands-Väsby | 16 | 5 | 0 | 11 | 30 | 48 | −18 | 10 | Relegated |
| 8 | Heby AIF | 16 | 4 | 2 | 10 | 27 | 45 | −18 | 10 | Relegated |
| 9 | Kolbäcks AIF | 16 | 2 | 1 | 13 | 19 | 50 | −31 | 5 | Relegated |

NB: Riddarhytte SK withdrew.

=== Centralserien Södra 1946–47 ===
| Pos | Team | Pld | W | D | L | GF | GA | GD | Pts | Qualification or relegation |
|---|---|---|---|---|---|---|---|---|---|---|
| 1 | IF Verdandi, Eskilstuna | 18 | 14 | 4 | 0 | 68 | 16 | +52 | 32 | |
| 2 | IK City, Eskilstuna | 18 | 14 | 2 | 2 | 82 | 27 | +55 | 30 | Relegation Playoffs |
| 3 | Södertälje SK | 18 | 10 | 4 | 4 | 48 | 34 | +14 | 24 | Relegated |
| 4 | Frövi IK | 18 | 6 | 7 | 5 | 51 | 42 | +9 | 19 | Relegated |
| 5 | IFK Hallsberg | 18 | 7 | 3 | 8 | 47 | 48 | −1 | 17 | Relegated |
| 6 | Östermalms IS, Eskilstuna | 18 | 6 | 4 | 8 | 31 | 34 | −3 | 16 | Relegated |
| 7 | IFK Arboga | 18 | 5 | 5 | 8 | 26 | 42 | −16 | 15 | Relegated |
| 8 | IFK Nora | 18 | 5 | 4 | 9 | 32 | 62 | −30 | 14 | Relegated |
| 9 | Wedevågs IF | 18 | 4 | 0 | 14 | 21 | 67 | −46 | 8 | Relegated |
| 10 | Örebro IK | 18 | 1 | 3 | 14 | 27 | 61 | −34 | 5 | Relegated |

=== Nordvästra Norra 1946–47 ===
| Pos | Team | Pld | W | D | L | GF | GA | GD | Pts | Qualification or relegation |
|---|---|---|---|---|---|---|---|---|---|---|
| 1 | IFK Munkfors | 18 | 15 | 0 | 3 | 58 | 26 | +32 | 30 | |
| 2 | IK Viking, Hagfors | 18 | 12 | 2 | 4 | 63 | 33 | +30 | 26 | Relegation Playoffs |
| 3 | IFK Bofors | 18 | 10 | 3 | 5 | 42 | 21 | +21 | 23 | Relegated |
| 4 | SK Sifhälla, Säffle | 18 | 10 | 2 | 6 | 37 | 31 | +6 | 22 | Relegated |
| 5 | IFK Kristinehamn | 18 | 9 | 3 | 6 | 38 | 29 | +9 | 21 | Relegated |
| 6 | Arvika BK | 18 | 7 | 1 | 10 | 41 | 36 | +5 | 15 | Relegated |
| 7 | Grums IK | 18 | 5 | 4 | 9 | 29 | 40 | −11 | 14 | Relegated |
| 8 | IFK Sunne | 18 | 5 | 3 | 10 | 38 | 76 | −38 | 13 | Relegated |
| 9 | Hällefors AIF | 18 | 4 | 3 | 11 | 25 | 42 | −17 | 11 | Relegated |
| 10 | Skoghalls IF | 18 | 2 | 1 | 15 | 20 | 57 | −37 | 5 | Relegated |

=== Nordvästra Södra 1946–47 ===
| Pos | Team | Pld | W | D | L | GF | GA | GD | Pts | Relegation |
|---|---|---|---|---|---|---|---|---|---|---|
| 1 | IFK Åmål | 18 | 12 | 4 | 2 | 61 | 28 | +33 | 28 | |
| 2 | Mustadfors IF | 18 | 11 | 3 | 4 | 54 | 24 | +30 | 25 | Relegation Playoffs - Relegated |
| 3 | Uddevalla IS | 18 | 10 | 2 | 6 | 43 | 24 | +19 | 22 | Relegated |
| 4 | Kungshamns IF | 18 | 8 | 5 | 5 | 29 | 29 | 0 | 21 | Relegated |
| 5 | Lysekils FF | 18 | 9 | 0 | 9 | 39 | 27 | +12 | 18 | Relegated |
| 6 | Fengersfors IK | 18 | 6 | 3 | 9 | 33 | 35 | −2 | 15 | Relegated |
| 7 | IK Kongahälla, Kungälv | 18 | 6 | 3 | 9 | 20 | 40 | −20 | 15 | Relegated |
| 8 | Munkedals IF | 18 | 5 | 4 | 9 | 32 | 45 | −13 | 14 | Relegated |
| 9 | Hunnebostrands GIF | 18 | 5 | 3 | 10 | 27 | 49 | −22 | 13 | Relegated |
| 10 | Stigens IF | 18 | 3 | 3 | 12 | 18 | 55 | −37 | 9 | Relegated |

=== Mellansvenska Norra 1946–47 ===
| Pos | Team | Pld | W | D | L | GF | GA | GD | Pts | Qualification or relegation |
|---|---|---|---|---|---|---|---|---|---|---|
| 1 | BK Kenty, Linköping | 18 | 13 | 3 | 2 | 38 | 16 | +22 | 29 | |
| 2 | Mjölby AIF | 18 | 12 | 3 | 3 | 44 | 24 | +20 | 27 | Relegation Playoffs |
| 3 | Finspångs AIK | 18 | 9 | 5 | 4 | 50 | 28 | +22 | 23 | Relegated |
| 4 | Skärblacka IF | 18 | 10 | 1 | 7 | 51 | 30 | +21 | 21 | Relegated |
| 5 | Katrineholms AIK | 18 | 7 | 7 | 4 | 28 | 25 | +3 | 21 | Relegated |
| 6 | Karle IF | 18 | 7 | 3 | 8 | 40 | 35 | +5 | 17 | Relegated |
| 7 | Motala AIF | 18 | 7 | 2 | 9 | 37 | 39 | −2 | 16 | Relegated |
| 8 | Taborsbergs SK | 18 | 4 | 3 | 11 | 31 | 53 | −22 | 11 | Relegated |
| 9 | Ljungsbro IF | 18 | 2 | 4 | 12 | 19 | 59 | −40 | 8 | Relegated |
| 10 | Loddby IF | 18 | 1 | 5 | 12 | 21 | 50 | −29 | 7 | Relegated |

=== Mellansvenska Södra 1946–47 ===
| Pos | Team | Pld | W | D | L | GF | GA | GD | Pts | Relegation |
|---|---|---|---|---|---|---|---|---|---|---|
| 1 | Huskvarna Södra IS | 18 | 16 | 2 | 0 | 75 | 19 | +56 | 34 | |
| 2 | IF Hallby, Jönköping | 18 | 10 | 4 | 4 | 57 | 34 | +23 | 24 | Relegation Playoffs - Relegated |
| 3 | Gnosjö IF | 18 | 7 | 6 | 5 | 55 | 45 | +10 | 20 | Relegated |
| 4 | Anderstorps IF | 18 | 7 | 4 | 7 | 29 | 38 | −9 | 18 | Relegated |
| 5 | Växjö BK | 18 | 7 | 3 | 8 | 45 | 43 | +2 | 17 | Relegated |
| 6 | IK Tord, Jönköping | 18 | 6 | 4 | 8 | 34 | 39 | −5 | 16 | Relegated |
| 7 | Waggeryds IK | 18 | 7 | 2 | 9 | 39 | 45 | −6 | 16 | Relegated |
| 8 | Nässjö IF | 18 | 7 | 2 | 9 | 44 | 52 | −8 | 16 | Relegated |
| 9 | Skillingaryds IS | 18 | 5 | 3 | 10 | 31 | 60 | −29 | 13 | Relegated |
| 10 | Alvesta GIF | 18 | 3 | 0 | 15 | 31 | 65 | −34 | 6 | Relegated |

=== Sydöstra Norra 1946–47 ===
| Pos | Team | Pld | W | D | L | GF | GA | GD | Pts | Relegation |
|---|---|---|---|---|---|---|---|---|---|---|
| 1 | Hvetlanda GIF, Vetlanda | 18 | 11 | 4 | 3 | 67 | 35 | +32 | 26 | |
| 2 | Västerviks AIS | 18 | 11 | 3 | 4 | 44 | 29 | +15 | 25 | Relegation Playoffs - Relegated |
| 3 | Oskarshamns AIK | 18 | 11 | 2 | 5 | 65 | 37 | +28 | 24 | Relegated |
| 4 | Norrhults BK | 18 | 11 | 1 | 6 | 51 | 44 | +7 | 23 | Relegated |
| 5 | IFK Oskarshamn | 18 | 8 | 5 | 5 | 67 | 36 | +31 | 21 | Relegated |
| 6 | Klavreströms IF | 18 | 7 | 3 | 8 | 37 | 42 | −5 | 17 | Relegated |
| 7 | Hultsfreds AIK | 18 | 7 | 2 | 9 | 40 | 47 | −7 | 16 | Relegated |
| 8 | Virserums SGF | 18 | 7 | 2 | 9 | 37 | 52 | −15 | 16 | Relegated |
| 9 | Blomstermåla IK | 18 | 4 | 1 | 13 | 34 | 46 | −12 | 9 | Relegated |
| 10 | Överums IK | 18 | 1 | 1 | 16 | 14 | 88 | −74 | 3 | Relegated |

=== Sydöstra Södra 1946–47 ===
| Pos | Team | Pld | W | D | L | GF | GA | GD | Pts | Qualification or relegation |
|---|---|---|---|---|---|---|---|---|---|---|
| 1 | Ronneby BK | 18 | 12 | 2 | 4 | 38 | 18 | +20 | 26 | |
| 2 | Bromölla IF | 18 | 11 | 3 | 4 | 61 | 24 | +37 | 25 | Relegation Playoffs |
| 3 | IFK Karlshamn | 18 | 12 | 1 | 5 | 59 | 26 | +33 | 25 | Relegated |
| 4 | Högadals IS | 18 | 10 | 2 | 6 | 53 | 33 | +20 | 22 | Relegated |
| 5 | Sölvesborgs GIF | 18 | 10 | 2 | 6 | 52 | 35 | +17 | 22 | Relegated |
| 6 | Östers IF, Växjö | 18 | 8 | 4 | 6 | 38 | 44 | −6 | 20 | Relegated |
| 7 | Karlskrona BK | 18 | 7 | 4 | 7 | 37 | 54 | −17 | 18 | Relegated |
| 8 | IFK Karlskrona | 18 | 4 | 3 | 11 | 34 | 46 | −12 | 11 | Relegated |
| 9 | Lessebo GIF | 18 | 3 | 2 | 13 | 34 | 63 | −29 | 8 | Relegated |
| 10 | Karlshamns FF | 18 | 0 | 3 | 15 | 20 | 83 | −63 | 3 | Relegated |

=== Västsvenska Norra 1946–47 ===
| Pos | Team | Pld | W | D | L | GF | GA | GD | Pts | Qualification or relegation |
|---|---|---|---|---|---|---|---|---|---|---|
| 1 | Norrbygärde IF | 18 | 12 | 1 | 5 | 52 | 18 | +34 | 25 | |
| 2 | Trollhättans IF | 18 | 9 | 6 | 3 | 27 | 18 | +9 | 24 | Relegation Playoffs |
| 3 | Skara IF | 18 | 11 | 1 | 6 | 46 | 33 | +13 | 23 | Relegated |
| 4 | IFK Tidaholm | 18 | 8 | 6 | 4 | 41 | 26 | +15 | 22 | Relegated |
| 5 | Skene IF | 18 | 9 | 4 | 5 | 51 | 37 | +14 | 22 | Relegated |
| 6 | Fritsla IF | 18 | 8 | 3 | 7 | 36 | 35 | +1 | 19 | Relegated |
| 7 | Vänersborgs IF | 18 | 6 | 3 | 9 | 24 | 40 | −16 | 15 | Relegated |
| 8 | IF Heimer, Lidköping | 18 | 6 | 1 | 11 | 28 | 39 | −11 | 13 | Relegated |
| 9 | Alingsås IF | 18 | 5 | 1 | 12 | 29 | 46 | −17 | 11 | Relegated |
| 10 | Mariestads BK | 18 | 1 | 4 | 13 | 25 | 64 | −39 | 6 | Relegated |

=== Västsvenska Södra 1946–47 ===
| Pos | Team | Pld | W | D | L | GF | GA | GD | Pts | Relegation |
|---|---|---|---|---|---|---|---|---|---|---|
| 1 | Jonsereds IF | 18 | 14 | 3 | 1 | 71 | 17 | +54 | 31 | |
| 2 | Sandarna BK, Göteborg | 18 | 13 | 4 | 1 | 55 | 20 | +35 | 30 | Relegation Playoffs - Relegated |
| 3 | Lindholmens BK, Göteborg | 18 | 10 | 2 | 6 | 41 | 25 | +16 | 22 | Relegated |
| 4 | Hisingstads IS, Hisingen | 18 | 8 | 3 | 7 | 33 | 36 | −3 | 19 | Relegated |
| 5 | Partille IF | 18 | 8 | 2 | 8 | 31 | 34 | −3 | 18 | Relegated |
| 6 | Krokslätts FF, Mölndal | 18 | 7 | 2 | 9 | 43 | 55 | −12 | 16 | Relegated |
| 7 | Majornas IK, Göteborg | 18 | 5 | 4 | 9 | 37 | 55 | −18 | 14 | Relegated |
| 8 | Västra Frölunda IF | 18 | 4 | 3 | 11 | 18 | 31 | −13 | 11 | Relegated |
| 9 | Gårda BK, Göteborg | 18 | 5 | 0 | 13 | 32 | 66 | −34 | 10 | Relegated |
| 10 | Mölnlycke IF | 18 | 4 | 1 | 13 | 36 | 58 | −22 | 9 | Relegated |

=== Sydsvenska Norra 1946–47 ===
| Pos | Team | Pld | W | D | L | GF | GA | GD | Pts | Relegation |
|---|---|---|---|---|---|---|---|---|---|---|
| 1 | Falkenbergs FF | 18 | 13 | 1 | 4 | 52 | 15 | +37 | 27 | |
| 2 | Varbergs BoIS | 18 | 11 | 4 | 3 | 43 | 14 | +29 | 26 | Relegation Playoffs - Relegated |
| 3 | Varbergs GIF | 18 | 11 | 3 | 4 | 45 | 21 | +24 | 25 | Relegated |
| 4 | Laholms BK | 18 | 11 | 0 | 7 | 47 | 40 | +7 | 22 | Relegated |
| 5 | Träslövsläges IF | 18 | 7 | 4 | 7 | 39 | 36 | +3 | 18 | Relegated |
| 6 | IFK Kungsbacka | 18 | 5 | 8 | 5 | 31 | 37 | −6 | 18 | Relegated |
| 7 | Oskarströms IS | 18 | 5 | 6 | 7 | 36 | 40 | −4 | 16 | Relegated |
| 8 | Hyltebruks IF | 18 | 4 | 4 | 10 | 27 | 56 | −29 | 12 | Relegated |
| 9 | IF Leikin, Halmstad | 18 | 2 | 4 | 12 | 22 | 56 | −34 | 8 | Relegated |
| 10 | Nyhems BK, Halmstad | 18 | 3 | 2 | 13 | 16 | 53 | −37 | 8 | Relegated |

=== Sydsvenska Södra 1946–47 ===
| Pos | Team | Pld | W | D | L | GF | GA | GD | Pts | Qualification or relegation |
|---|---|---|---|---|---|---|---|---|---|---|
| 1 | Råå IF | 18 | 13 | 5 | 0 | 50 | 10 | +40 | 31 | |
| 2 | Lunds BK | 18 | 11 | 4 | 3 | 59 | 30 | +29 | 26 | Relegation Playoffs |
| 3 | Limhamns IF | 18 | 10 | 2 | 6 | 46 | 30 | +16 | 22 | Relegated |
| 4 | Kävlinge GIF | 18 | 8 | 4 | 6 | 49 | 31 | +18 | 20 | Relegated |
| 5 | IFK Trelleborg | 18 | 7 | 3 | 8 | 32 | 34 | −2 | 17 | Relegated |
| 6 | Eskilsminne IF | 18 | 8 | 0 | 10 | 33 | 42 | −9 | 16 | Relegated |
| 7 | Klippans BIF | 18 | 6 | 3 | 9 | 43 | 54 | −11 | 15 | Relegated |
| 8 | Trelleborgs FF | 18 | 4 | 6 | 8 | 32 | 48 | −16 | 14 | Relegated |
| 9 | BK Drott, Hälsingborg | 18 | 4 | 4 | 10 | 20 | 49 | −29 | 12 | Relegated |
| 10 | Hälsingborgs AIS | 18 | 1 | 5 | 12 | 21 | 57 | −36 | 7 | Relegated |
