= 1943–44 Division 3 (Swedish football) =

Swedish League Division 3
- Season: 1943–44
- Champions: Iggesunds IK; Avesta AIK; Hofors AIF; Sundbybergs IK; IF Vesta; Surahammars IF; IK City; Karlstads BIK; IFK Åmål; Lysekils FF; Taborsbergs SK; Husqvarna IF; Blomstermåla IK; Lessebo GIF; IFK Tidaholm; Jonsereds IF; Alets IK; BK Drott
- Promoted: 8 teams
- Relegated: 30 teams

Statistics of Swedish football Division 3 for the 1943–44 season.

== League standings ==
=== Uppsvenska Sydöstra 1943–44 ===
Pos	Team	Pld	W	D	L	GF	GA	GD	Pts	Qualification or relegation
1	Iggesunds IK	18	14	2	2	48	19	+29	30	Promotion Playoffs
2	Söderhamns IF	18	13	1	4	49	22	+27	27	
3	Strömsbruks IF	18	7	5	6	37	37	0	19	
4	IFK Bergvik	18	6	6	6	31	32	−1	18	
5	Ljusdals IF	18	7	4	7	32	38	−6	18	
6	Alfta GIF	18	8	1	9	61	46	+15	17	
7	Strands IF, Hudiksvall	18	6	2	10	34	41	−7	14	
8	Hudiksvalls IF	18	6	2	10	35	44	−9	14	
9	Skärgårdens IF, Sandarne	18	5	2	11	35	48	−13	12	Relegated
10	Arbrå BK	18	5	1	12	29	64	−35	11	Relegated

=== Uppsvenska Sydvästra 1943–44 ===
Pos	Team	Pld	W	D	L	GF	GA	GD	Pts	Promotion or relegation
1	Avesta AIK	18	13	3	2	68	28	+40	29	Promotion Playoffs – Promoted
2	Forssa BK	18	12	2	4	58	24	+34	26	
3	IFK Grängesberg	18	11	4	3	48	25	+23	26	
4	Långshyttans AIK	18	10	4	4	44	19	+25	24	
5	Malungs IF	18	7	3	8	40	41	−1	17	
6	Falu BS, Falun	18	6	3	9	38	44	−6	15	
7	IFK Mora	18	7	0	11	30	41	−11	14	
8	Islingby IK	18	5	2	11	31	48	−17	12	
9	IK Heros, Smedjebacken	18	5	2	11	36	58	−22	12	Relegated
10	Leksands IF	18	2	1	15	23	88	−65	5	Relegated

=== Östsvenska Norra 1943–44 ===
Pos	Team	Pld	W	D	L	GF	GA	GD	Pts	Qualification or relegation
1	Hofors AIF	18	12	3	3	59	23	+36	27	Promotion Playoffs
2	Brynäs IF, Gävle	18	11	2	5	66	27	+39	24	
3	Högbo AIK	18	10	4	4	34	25	+9	24	
4	Skutskärs IF	18	10	1	7	37	44	−7	21	
5	Örbyhus IF	18	8	3	7	41	34	+7	19	
6	IFK Gävle	18	8	2	8	32	33	−1	18	
7	IK Huge, Gävle	18	6	4	8	40	54	−14	16	
8	Södra BK, Gävle	18	5	3	10	32	57	−25	13	
9	Söderfors GIF	18	5	1	12	31	55	−24	11	Relegated
10	Forsbacka IK	18	3	1	14	22	42	−20	7	Relegated

=== Östsvenska Södra 1943–44 ===
Pos	Team	Pld	W	D	L	GF	GA	GD	Pts	Promotion or relegation
1	Sundbybergs IK	18	14	0	4	71	24	+47	28	Promotion Playoffs – Promoted
2	Årsta SK, Stockholm	18	10	3	5	53	36	+17	23	
3	Nynäshamns IF	18	9	3	6	45	34	+11	21	
4	Eriksdals IF, Stockholm	18	9	2	7	49	52	−3	20	
5	Vasalunds IF, Solna	18	7	4	7	37	39	−2	18	
6	Enskede IK	18	8	0	10	31	52	−21	16	
7	IFK Lidingö	18	6	3	9	31	39	−8	15	
8	IF Triangeln, Stockholm	18	7	0	11	51	55	−4	14	
9	IK Tellus, Stockholm	18	7	0	11	27	56	−29	14	Relegated
10	Värtans IK, Stockholm	18	5	1	12	36	44	−8	11	Relegated

=== Centralserien Norra, Uppland 1943–44 ===
Pos	Team	Pld	W	D	L	GF	GA	GD	Pts	Qualification or relegation
1	IF Vesta, Uppsala	14	10	2	2	55	22	+33	22	Promotion Playoffs
2	Enköpings SK	14	7	5	2	31	18	+13	19	
3	Heby AIF	14	6	6	2	37	28	+9	18	
4	Lunda SK, Märsta	14	7	3	4	35	29	+6	17	
5	IF Olympia, Stockholm	14	4	4	6	30	25	+5	12	
6	Morgongåva SK	14	3	3	8	16	28	−12	9	
7	Norrtälje IF	14	3	2	9	25	64	−39	8	Relegated
8	IK Sirius, Uppsala	14	3	1	10	19	34	−15	7	Relegated

=== Centralserien Norra, Västmanland 1943–44 ===
Pos	Team	Pld	W	D	L	GF	GA	GD	Pts	Promotion or relegation
1	Surahammars IF	18	16	0	2	84	11	+73	32	Promotion Playoffs – Promoted
2	Västerås IK	18	11	1	6	48	35	+13	23	
3	IF Rune, Kungsör	18	10	2	6	49	38	+11	22	
4	IFK Arboga	18	8	5	5	36	38	−2	21	
5	Fagersta AIK	18	7	4	7	38	38	0	18	
6	Kolsva IF	18	6	4	8	42	42	0	16	
7	Köpings IS	18	5	4	9	31	50	−19	14	
8	Riddarhytte SK	18	6	1	11	43	74	−31	13	
9	Skultuna IS	18	4	3	11	30	45	−15	11	Relegated
10	IF Norden, Sala	18	5	0	13	30	60	−30	10	Relegated

=== Centralserien Södra 1943–44 ===
Pos	Team	Pld	W	D	L	GF	GA	GD	Pts	Qualification or relegation
1	IK City, Eskilstuna	18	12	2	4	71	37	+34	26	Promotion Playoffs
2	BK Forward, Örebro	18	10	4	4	44	27	+17	24	
3	Östermalms IS, Eskilstuna	18	10	1	7	41	30	+11	21	
4	Örebro IK	18	9	2	7	33	33	0	20	
5	Frövi IK	18	8	3	7	39	32	+7	19	
6	Tunafors SK, Eskilstuna	18	9	1	8	28	39	−11	19	
7	IFK Nora	18	8	2	8	46	38	+8	18	
8	IFK Kumla	18	6	2	10	35	45	−10	14	
9	IFK Hallsberg	18	6	1	11	38	48	−10	13	Relegated
10	Östansjö IF	18	2	2	14	21	67	−46	6	Relegated

=== Nordvästra Norra 1943–44 ===
Pos	Team	Pld	W	D	L	GF	GA	GD	Pts	Promotion or relegation
1	Karlstads BIK	18	14	1	3	52	22	+30	29	Promotion Playoffs – Promoted
2	Deje IK	18	12	3	3	65	24	+41	27	
3	IFK Bofors	18	10	2	6	49	28	+21	22	
4	Arvika BK	18	10	2	6	51	37	+14	22	
5	IK Viking, Hagfors	18	9	2	7	52	39	+13	20	
6	Skoghalls IF	18	8	3	7	40	33	+7	19	
7	Hällefors AIF	18	6	3	9	40	55	−15	15	
8	IF Örnen, Kristinehamn	18	5	1	12	26	54	−28	11	
9	Munkeruds AIS	18	3	2	13	36	75	−39	8	
10	IFK Sunne	18	3	1	14	26	70	−44	7	Relegated

=== Nordvästra Södra, Dalsland 1943–44 ===
Pos	Team	Pld	W	D	L	GF	GA	GD	Pts	Qualification or relegation
1	IFK Åmål	14	13	0	1	60	7	+53	26	Promotion Playoffs
2	SK Sifhälla, Säffle	14	7	3	4	37	26	+11	17	
3	IF Viken, Åmål	14	7	2	5	38	21	+17	16	
4	Stigens IF	14	8	0	6	31	35	−4	16	
5	Mustadfors IF	14	6	0	8	30	31	−1	12	
6	Fengersfors IK	14	4	2	8	21	37	−16	10	
7	Färgelanda IF	14	4	1	9	19	42	−23	9	
8	Långeds IF	14	3	0	11	22	59	−37	6	Relegated

=== Nordvästra Södra, Bohus 1943–44 ===
Pos	Team	Pld	W	D	L	GF	GA	GD	Pts	Qualification or relegation
1	Lysekils FF	14	11	0	3	44	23	+21	22	Promotion Playoffs
2	Fjällbacka IK	14	9	0	5	33	16	+17	18	
3	Hunnebostrands GIF	14	7	2	5	31	36	−5	16	
4	IK Kongahälla, Kungälv	14	7	1	6	34	21	+13	15	
5	Uddevalla IS	14	6	1	7	22	24	−2	13	
6	IFK Kungälv	14	5	2	7	27	32	−5	12	
7	IFK Strömstad	14	4	0	10	22	39	−17	8	Relegated
8	IK Svane	14	4	0	10	17	39	−22	8	Relegated

=== Mellansvenska Norra 1943–44 ===
Pos	Team	Pld	W	D	L	GF	GA	GD	Pts	Promotion or relegation
1	Taborsbergs SK	18	10	7	1	49	25	+24	27	Promotion Playoffs
2	Karle IF	18	8	4	6	35	37	−2	20	
3	Skärblacka IF	18	8	4	6	37	41	−4	20	
4	BK Zeros, Motala	18	8	4	6	36	46	−10	20	
5	Motala AIF	18	7	5	6	28	28	0	19	
6	Katrineholms SK	18	6	6	6	35	25	+10	18	
7	Katrineholms AIK	18	6	5	7	43	40	+3	17	
8	BK Derby, Linköping	18	6	4	8	41	32	+9	16	
9	BK Kenty, Linköping	18	5	6	7	40	39	+1	16	Relegated
10	Loddby IF	18	3	1	14	20	51	−31	7	Relegated

=== Mellansvenska Södra 1943–44 ===
Pos	Team	Pld	W	D	L	GF	GA	GD	Pts	Promotion or relegation
1	Husqvarna IF	18	13	2	3	65	31	+34	28	Promotion Playoffs – Promoted
2	Huskvarna Södra IS	18	11	3	4	52	25	+27	25	
3	IFK Värnamo	18	8	7	3	38	23	+15	23	
4	Gislaveds IS	18	8	4	6	31	41	−10	20	
5	Gnosjö IF	18	8	2	8	39	49	−10	18	
6	Ljungby IF	18	6	3	9	30	38	−8	15	
7	IK Tord, Jönköping	18	5	4	9	27	36	−9	14	
8	Nässjö IF	18	5	4	9	36	46	−10	14	
9	Tranås AIF	18	5	3	10	39	43	−4	13	
10	Waggeryds IK	18	3	4	11	26	51	−25	10	Relegated

=== Sydöstra Norra 1943–44 ===
Pos	Team	Pld	W	D	L	GF	GA	GD	Pts	Promotion or relegation
1	Blomstermåla IK	16	12	1	3	43	22	+21	25	Promotion Playoffs – Promoted
2	IFK Oskarshamn	16	9	3	4	75	30	+45	21	
3	Oskarshamns AIK	16	9	3	4	45	32	+13	21	
4	Västerviks AIS	16	7	4	5	34	39	−5	18	
5	Kalmar AIK	16	8	0	8	68	50	+18	16	
6	Målilla GIF	16	7	2	7	36	45	−9	16	
7	Hvetlanda GIF, Vetlanda	16	6	2	8	36	39	−3	14	
8	IF Hebe, Silverdalen	16	5	1	10	37	49	−12	11	
9	Klavreströms IF	16	1	0	15	14	82	−68	2	Relegated

=== Sydöstra Södra 1943–44 ===
Pos	Team	Pld	W	D	L	GF	GA	GD	Pts	Qualification or relegation
1	Lessebo GIF	18	13	3	2	60	25	+35	29	Promotion Playoffs
2	Högadals IS	18	13	2	3	54	25	+29	28	
3	Sölvesborgs GIF	18	7	5	6	40	35	+5	19	
4	Kallinge SK	18	7	4	7	43	43	0	18	
5	IFK Karlshamn	18	7	4	7	34	36	−2	18	
6	Pantarholmens SK	18	6	5	7	23	24	−1	17	
7	Hovmantorps GIF	18	6	5	7	36	38	−2	17	
8	Karlskrona BK	18	5	5	8	33	39	−6	15	
9	Ronneby BK	18	3	6	9	30	45	−15	12	Relegated
10	Mjällby AIF	18	3	1	14	22	66	−44	7	Relegated

=== Västsvenska Norra 1943–44 ===
Pos	Team	Pld	W	D	L	GF	GA	GD	Pts	Promotion or relegation
1	IFK Tidaholm	18	12	1	5	54	23	+31	25	Promotion Playoffs – Promoted
2	Trollhättans IF	18	10	5	3	42	15	+27	25	
3	Skene IF	18	10	4	4	44	28	+16	24	
4	Alingsås IF	18	9	3	6	40	31	+9	21	
5	Kinna IF	18	9	2	7	28	24	+4	20	
6	Norrbygärde IF	18	8	3	7	40	26	+14	19	
7	Skara IF	18	8	3	7	51	47	+4	19	
8	Skövde AIK	18	7	1	10	33	53	−20	15	
9	IF Heimer, Lidköping	18	5	2	11	25	37	−12	12	
10	Vänersborgs IF	18	0	0	18	10	83	−73	0	Relegated

=== Västsvenska Södra 1943–44 ===
Pos	Team	Pld	W	D	L	GF	GA	GD	Pts	Qualification or relegation
1	Jonsereds IF	18	15	2	1	72	17	+55	32	Promotion Playoffs
2	Göteborgs FF	18	11	3	4	30	21	+9	25	
3	Lindholmens BK, Göteborg	18	9	4	5	47	35	+12	22	
4	Majornas IK, Göteborg	18	9	3	6	47	28	+19	21	
5	IK Virgo, Göteborg	18	8	3	7	51	36	+15	19	
6	Lerums IS	18	7	4	7	42	46	−4	18	
7	Hisingstads IS, Hisingen	18	8	1	9	43	36	+7	17	
8	Partille IF	18	4	2	12	22	46	−24	10	
9	IF Warta, Göteborg	18	3	3	12	17	65	−48	9	Relegated
10	Vidkärrs IF	18	2	3	13	19	60	−41	7	Relegated

=== Sydsvenska Norra 1943–44 ===
Pos	Team	Pld	W	D	L	GF	GA	GD	Pts	Promotion or relegation
1	Alets IK	18	12	4	2	63	25	+38	28	Promotion Playoffs – Promoted
2	Falkenbergs FF	18	10	2	6	48	25	+23	22	
3	Varbergs GIF	18	9	4	5	55	35	+20	22	
4	Varbergs BoIS	18	8	6	4	45	29	+16	22	
5	Nyhems BK, Halmstad	18	10	2	6	53	41	+12	22	
6	IS Örnia, Halmstad	18	6	4	8	39	38	+1	16	
7	IF Leikin, Halmstad	18	6	4	8	34	35	−1	16	
8	IFK Kungsbacka	18	7	0	11	28	52	−24	14	
9	Morups IF	18	3	4	11	28	65	−37	10	
10	Oskarströms IS	18	2	4	12	26	74	−48	8	Relegated

=== Sydsvenska Södra 1943–44 ===
Pos	Team	Pld	W	D	L	GF	GA	GD	Pts	Qualification or relegation
1	BK Drott, Hälsingborg	18	14	3	1	54	22	+32	31	Promotion Playoffs
2	Eskilsminne IF, Hälsingborg	18	14	1	3	64	24	+40	29	
3	Klippans BoIF	18	8	3	7	41	30	+11	19	
4	Malmö BI	18	6	5	7	41	31	+10	17	
5	IFK Kristianstad	18	7	3	8	34	36	−2	17	
6	IFK Höganäs	18	7	2	9	37	49	−12	16	
7	Kävlinge GIF	18	6	3	9	31	32	−1	15	
8	IFK Trelleborg	18	4	4	10	23	40	−17	12	
9	Sofielunds IF, Malmö	18	5	2	11	41	70	−29	12	Relegated
10	Bjuvs IF	18	5	2	11	27	57	−30	12	Relegated
