= 1995 Division 2 (Swedish football) =

Swedish football league season

Statistics of Swedish football Division 2 for the 1995 season.

== League standings ==
=== Division 2 Norrland ===
Pos	Team	Pld	W	D	L	GF	GA	GD	Pts	Promotion or relegation
1	Gimonäs (P)	22	15	3	4	48	20	+28	48	Promotion to Division 1
2	IFK Sundsvall	22	12	4	6	42	23	+19	40	Promotion Playoffs
3	Ope IF	22	10	7	5	42	28	+14	37	
4	Gällivare	22	11	4	7	38	30	+8	37	
5	Boden	22	11	3	8	38	33	+5	36	
6	Skellefteå AIK	22	9	7	6	43	36	+7	34	
7	Obbola IK	22	7	9	6	31	29	+2	30	
8	Piteå IF	22	8	4	10	23	36	−13	28	
9	Kiruna	22	7	4	11	29	43	−14	25	
10	Morön	22	4	6	12	30	43	−13	18	Division 3 Relegation Playoffs
11	IFK Umeå (R)	22	4	5	13	31	49	−18	17	Relegation to Division 3
12	Matfors (R)	22	4	4	14	27	52	−25	16	Relegation to Division 3

Rules for classification: 1) points; 2) goal difference; 3) number of goals scored.
(P) Promoted; (R) Relegated

=== Division 2 Östra Svealand ===
Pos	Team	Pld	W	D	L	GF	GA	GD	Pts	Promotion or relegation
1	Spårvägen (P)	22	17	2	3	64	21	+43	53	Promotion to Division 1
2	Tyresö FF	22	13	5	4	31	15	+16	44	Promotion Playoffs
3	Nacka FF	22	10	8	4	41	26	+15	38	
4	Plavi Team/Stockholm	22	11	4	7	35	23	+12	37	
5	Spånga (R)	22	10	4	8	38	35	+3	34	
6	Västerhaninge IF	22	9	6	7	35	37	−2	33	
7	Gimo	22	9	3	10	32	38	−6	30	
8	Hudiksvall	22	7	6	9	24	40	−16	27	
9	Norrtälje	22	6	5	11	38	48	−10	23	
10	Älvsjö	22	5	5	12	26	37	−11	20	Division 3 Relegation Playoffs
11	Helenelunds IK (R)	22	4	5	13	22	41	−19	17	Relegation to Division 3
12	Delsbo (R)	22	3	3	16	29	54	−25	12	Relegation to Division 3

Rules for classification: 1) points; 2) goal difference; 3) number of goals scored.
(P) Promoted; (R) Relegated

=== Division 2 Västra Svealand ===
Pos	Team	Pld	W	D	L	GF	GA	GD	Pts	Promotion or relegation
1	Hertzöga (P)	22	16	2	4	52	20	+32	50	Promotion to Division 1
2	IFK Västerås	22	13	3	6	51	34	+17	42	Promotion Playoffs
3	Enköpings SK	22	13	3	6	51	38	+13	42	
4	IF Sylvia	22	11	3	8	43	29	+14	36	
5	Karlslunds IF	22	11	2	9	43	41	+2	35	
6	City	22	9	5	8	36	33	+3	32	
7	IFK Eskilstuna	22	9	4	9	47	37	+10	31	
8	Karlstad BK	22	8	3	11	36	44	−8	27	
9	Nyköpings BIS	22	7	5	10	34	44	−10	26	
10	Ludvika FK	22	5	7	10	27	32	−5	22	Division 3 Relegation Playoffs
11	Arboga Södra (R)	22	5	2	15	17	52	−35	17	Relegation to Division 3
12	Syrianska Föreningen (R)	22	3	5	14	16	51	−35	14	Relegation to Division 3

Rules for classification: 1) points; 2) goal difference; 3) number of goals scored.
(P) Promoted; (R) Relegated

=== Division 2 Östra Götaland ===
Pos	Team	Pld	W	D	L	GF	GA	GD	Pts	Promotion or relegation
1	Åtvidabergs FF (P)	22	12	5	5	44	20	+24	41	Promotion to Division 1
2	Motala AIF	22	12	5	5	45	23	+22	41	Promotion Playoffs
3	Linköping	22	11	7	4	47	37	+10	40	
4	Växjö Norra IF	22	11	6	5	33	25	+8	39	
5	Husqvarna FF	22	11	5	6	42	27	+15	38	
6	Kalmar AIK	22	10	5	7	42	41	+1	35	
7	IK Sleipner	22	8	6	8	45	45	0	30	
8	Grimsås	22	6	6	10	19	38	−19	24	
9	Älmhult	22	4	8	10	33	39	−6	20	
10	Nässjö	22	5	5	12	36	54	−18	20	Division 3 Relegation Playoffs
11	Mjölby (R)	22	4	5	13	30	48	−18	17	Relegation to Division 3
12	IFK Värnamo (R)	22	1	11	10	20	39	−19	14	Relegation to Division 3

Rules for classification: 1) points; 2) goal difference; 3) number of goals scored.
(P) Promoted; (R) Relegated

=== Division 2 Västra Götaland ===
Pos	Team	Pld	W	D	L	GF	GA	GD	Pts	Promotion or relegation
1	Lundby (P)	22	15	3	4	54	32	+22	48	Promotion to Division 1
2	Qviding FIF	22	15	2	5	67	35	+32	47	Promotion Playoffs
3	Holmalunds IF	22	10	6	6	50	37	+13	36	
4	Jonsered	22	9	6	7	45	34	+11	33	
5	IF Heimer	22	9	5	8	40	54	−14	32	
6	IFK Uddevalla	22	9	3	10	40	47	−7	30	
7	Tidaholms GIF	22	8	4	10	46	42	+4	28	
8	Ulvåkers IF	22	7	7	8	31	27	+4	28	
9	Åsa	22	7	4	11	35	41	−6	25	
10	Kungsbacka BI	22	7	3	12	44	57	−13	24	Division 3 Relegation Playoffs
11	Mellerud (R)	22	6	5	11	39	57	−18	23	Relegation to Division 3
12	Alingsås (R)	22	3	6	13	33	61	−28	15	Relegation to Division 3

Rules for classification: 1) points; 2) goal difference; 3) number of goals scored.
(P) Promoted; (R) Relegated

=== Division 2 Södra Götaland ===
Pos	Team	Pld	W	D	L	GF	GA	GD	Pts	Promotion or relegation
1	Mjällby AIF (P)	22	18	2	2	53	21	+32	56	Promotion to Division 1
2	IFK Trelleborg	22	14	3	5	45	22	+23	45	Promotion Playoffs
3	IFK Malmö	22	13	4	5	44	26	+18	43	
4	Lunds BK	22	11	4	7	36	28	+8	37	
5	Kristianstads FF	22	11	2	9	49	31	+18	35	
6	IFK Karlshamn	22	9	3	10	38	42	−4	30	
7	Karlskrona	22	9	3	10	32	44	−12	30	
8	IS Halmia	22	9	2	11	40	44	−4	29	
9	Veberöds AIF	22	7	3	12	38	58	−20	24	
10	Ifö/Bromölla	22	5	4	13	29	44	−15	19	Division 3 Relegation Playoffs
11	Kulladal (R)	22	4	4	14	32	49	−17	16	Relegation to Division 3
12	Markaryd (R)	22	2	6	14	22	49	−27	12	Relegation to Division 3

Rules for classification: 1) points; 2) goal difference; 3) number of goals scored.
(P) Promoted; (R) Relegated
