= 1993 Division 2 (Swedish football) =

Swedish football league season

The following are the statistics of the Swedish football Division 2 for the 1993 season.

== League standings ==
=== Division 2 Norrland ===
Pos	Team	Pld	W	D	L	GF	GA	GD	Pts	Promotion or relegation
1	Kiruna (P)	22	17	5	0	62	14	+48	56	Promotion to Division 1
2	Skellefteå AIK	22	14	4	4	45	20	+25	46	Promotion Playoffs
3	Matfors	22	11	6	5	30	16	+14	39	
4	Lira BK	22	10	6	6	30	27	+3	36	
5	Morön	22	11	1	10	42	41	+1	34	
6	Alnön	22	9	3	10	46	43	+3	30	
7	IFK Östersund	22	7	6	9	30	24	+6	27	
8	Gällivare	22	7	6	9	32	35	−3	27	
9	Piteå IF	22	7	5	10	34	44	−10	26	
10	MoDo	22	5	4	13	26	48	−22	19	Division 3 Relegation Playoffs
11	Delsbo (R)	22	4	6	12	28	54	−26	18	Relegation to Division 3
12	Hudiksvall (R)	22	2	4	16	22	61	−39	10	Relegation to Division 3

Rules for classification: 1) points; 2) goal difference; 3) number of goals scored.
(P) Promoted; (R) Relegated

=== Division 2 Östra Svealand ===
Pos	Team	Pld	W	D	L	GF	GA	GD	Pts	Promotion or relegation
1	Visby IF Gute (P)	22	14	2	6	55	31	+24	44	Promotion to Division 1
2	Väsby IK	22	12	4	6	52	24	+28	40	Promotion Playoffs
3	Nacka FF	22	11	7	4	27	24	+3	40	
4	Syrianska Föreningen	22	7	10	5	30	25	+5	31	
5	Gimo	22	9	4	9	40	47	−7	31	
6	Norrtälje	22	8	6	8	36	35	+1	30	
7	Enköpings SK	22	7	9	6	31	33	−2	30	
8	IFK Stockholm	22	8	5	9	25	24	+1	29	
9	Älvsjö	22	7	7	8	28	34	−6	28	
10	Bollnäs	22	6	6	10	32	41	−9	24	Division 3 Relegation Playoffs
11	Film (R)	22	5	6	11	25	45	−20	21	Relegation to Division 3
12	Södertälje FF (R)	22	3	4	15	26	54	−28	13	Relegation to Division 3

Rules for classification: 1) points; 2) goal difference; 3) number of goals scored.
(P) Promoted; (R) Relegated

=== Division 2 Västra Svealand ===
Pos	Team	Pld	W	D	L	GF	GA	GD	Pts	Promotion or relegation
1	Västerås SK (P)	22	16	4	2	46	17	+29	52	Promotion to Division 1
2	IFK Västerås	22	15	3	4	49	31	+18	48	Promotion Playoffs
3	Hertzöga	22	10	4	8	47	29	+18	34	
4	Ludvika FK	22	9	6	7	36	28	+8	33	
5	Karlslunds IF	22	8	6	8	26	27	−1	30	
6	City	22	8	5	9	27	34	−7	29	
7	IFK Eskilstuna	22	8	5	9	43	49	−6	29	
8	Karlstad BK	22	7	6	9	27	42	−15	27	
9	Skiljebo SK	22	7	6	9	30	40	−10	27	
10	Norrstrand	22	6	3	13	28	38	−10	21	Division 3 Relegation Playoffs
11	Arboga Södra (R)	22	5	6	11	31	44	−13	21	Relegation to Division 3
12	KB Karlskoga (R)	22	3	6	13	28	59	−31	15	Relegation to Division 3

Rules for classification: 1) points; 2) goal difference; 3) number of goals scored.
(P) Promoted; (R) Relegated

=== Division 2 Östra Götaland ===
Pos	Team	Pld	W	D	L	GF	GA	GD	Pts	Promotion or relegation
1	IK Sleipner (P)	22	16	3	3	66	28	+38	51	Promotion to Division 1
2	Nybro IF	22	11	6	5	47	40	+7	39	Promotion Playoffs
3	Motala AIF	22	11	5	6	38	31	+7	38	
4	Husqvarna FF	22	11	3	8	35	30	+5	36	
5	Grimsås	22	10	2	10	42	42	0	32	
6	Växjö BK	22	8	6	8	42	37	+5	30	
7	Ramunder	22	7	6	9	38	42	−4	27	
8	Kalmar AIK	22	8	3	11	28	41	−13	27	
9	IFK Värnamo	22	8	1	13	27	40	−13	25	
10	Gullringen	22	6	5	11	24	31	−7	23	Division 3 Relegation Playoffs
11	Mjölby (R)	22	5	7	10	29	37	−8	22	Relegation to Division 3
12	Nässjö (R)	22	6	3	13	30	47	−17	21	Relegation to Division 3

Rules for classification: 1) points; 2) goal difference; 3) number of goals scored.
(P) Promoted; (R) Relegated

=== Division 2 Västra Götaland ===
Pos	Team	Pld	W	D	L	GF	GA	GD	Pts	Promotion or relegation
1	Ljungskile SK (P)	22	16	4	2	57	20	+37	52	Promotion to Division 1
2	Stenungsund	22	15	3	4	58	20	+38	48	Promotion Playoffs
3	Ulvåkers IF	22	11	7	4	44	19	+25	40	
4	Norrby IF	22	11	2	9	50	34	+16	35	
5	Tidaholms GIF	22	8	7	7	41	40	+1	31	
6	Mellerud	22	8	5	9	35	39	−4	29	
7	Kungsbacka BI	22	8	5	9	25	32	−7	29	
8	Holmalunds IF	22	7	6	9	42	43	−1	27	
9	Bjurslätt	22	6	8	8	23	33	−10	26	
10	Varbergs BoIS	22	7	4	11	29	43	−14	25	Division 3 Relegation Playoffs
11	IFK Strömstad (R)	22	3	7	12	26	50	−24	16	Relegation to Division 3
12	Askim (R)	22	3	0	19	18	66	−48	9	Relegation to Division 3

Rules for classification: 1) points; 2) goal difference; 3) number of goals scored.
(P) Promoted; (R) Relegated

=== Division 2 Södra Götaland ===
Pos	Team	Pld	W	D	L	GF	GA	GD	Pts	Promotion or relegation
1	Karlskrona (P)	22	13	6	3	45	21	+24	45	Promotion to Division 1
2	Falkenbergs FF	22	14	2	6	48	29	+19	44	Promotion Playoffs
3	Markaryd	22	11	4	7	40	27	+13	37	
4	IFK Karlshamn	22	11	4	7	34	27	+7	37	
5	Veberöds AIF	22	10	5	7	36	35	+1	35	
6	IFK Trelleborg	22	8	7	7	29	24	+5	31	
7	IF Leikin	22	8	7	7	43	44	−1	31	
8	Vinbergs IF	22	9	3	10	32	36	−4	30	
9	Åhus Horna	22	5	8	9	32	36	−4	23	
10	Arlöv	22	7	2	13	29	38	−9	23	Division 3 Relegation Playoffs
11	Astrio (R)	22	7	2	13	29	39	−10	23	Relegation to Division 3
12	Tomelilla (R)	22	3	2	17	18	59	−41	11	Relegation to Division 3

Rules for classification: 1) points; 2) goal difference; 3) number of goals scored.
(P) Promoted; (R) Relegated
