= 1996 Division 2 (Swedish football) =

Swedish football league season

Statistics of Swedish football Division 2 for the 1996 season.

== League standings ==
=== Division 2 Norrland ===
Pos	Team	Pld	W	D	L	GF	GA	GD	Pts	Promotion or relegation
1	Lira BK (P)	22	15	4	3	43	18	+25	49	Promotion to Division 1
2	Piteå IF	22	13	3	6	34	19	+15	42	Promotion Playoffs
3	Ope IF	22	11	3	8	35	19	+16	36	
4	Gällivare	22	10	4	8	32	25	+7	34	
5	Boden	22	10	4	8	28	32	−4	34	
6	IFK Sundsvall	22	9	6	7	33	32	+1	33	
7	Skellefteå AIK	22	9	5	8	36	29	+7	32	
8	Kiruna	22	6	8	8	42	42	0	26	
9	Obbola IK	22	7	4	11	32	42	−10	25	
10	Assi	22	5	8	9	22	30	−8	23	Division 3 Relegation Playoffs
11	IFK Östersund (R)	22	5	7	10	20	33	−13	22	Relegation to Division 3
12	Alnön (R)	22	2	4	16	14	50	−36	10	Relegation to Division 3

Rules for classification: 1) points; 2) goal difference; 3) number of goals scored.
(P) Promoted; (R) Relegated

=== Division 2 Östra Svealand ===
Pos	Team	Pld	W	D	L	GF	GA	GD	Pts	Promotion or relegation
1	Nacka FF (P)	22	14	6	2	27	16	+11	48	Promotion to Division 1
2	Sandvikens IF	22	15	2	5	52	28	+24	47	Promotion Playoffs
3	Vallentuna	22	12	5	5	55	37	+18	41	
4	Tyresö FF	22	12	4	6	27	22	+5	40	
5	Väsby IK	22	10	5	7	43	29	+14	35	
6	Plavi Team/Stockholm	22	8	6	8	31	30	+1	30	
7	Hudiksvall	22	8	4	10	41	45	−4	28	
8	IFK Österåker	22	7	4	11	32	40	−8	25	
9	Gimo	22	6	6	10	22	43	−21	24	
10	Västerhaninge IF	22	5	4	13	30	44	−14	19	Division 3 Relegation Playoffs
11	Norrtälje (R)	22	4	5	13	32	52	−20	17	Relegation to Division 3
12	Huddinge IF (R)	22	4	3	15	25	51	−26	15	Relegation to Division 3

Rules for classification: 1) points; 2) goal difference; 3) number of goals scored.
(P) Promoted; (R) Relegated

=== Division 2 Västra Svealand ===
Pos	Team	Pld	W	D	L	GF	GA	GD	Pts	Promotion or relegation
1	Assyriska Föreningen (P)	22	12	7	3	41	19	+22	43	Promotion to Division 1
2	Enköpings SK	22	11	6	5	27	21	+6	39	Promotion Playoffs
3	IFK Eskilstuna	22	10	8	4	41	23	+18	38	
4	Karlstad BK	22	10	4	8	41	40	+1	34	
5	IF Sylvia	22	9	4	9	31	31	0	31	
6	Älvsjö	22	9	2	11	30	46	−16	29	
7	Ludvika FK	22	7	7	8	28	25	+3	28	
8	IFK Västerås	22	7	7	8	29	30	−1	28	
9	City	22	7	7	8	30	33	−3	28	
10	Nyköpings BIS	22	8	4	10	31	46	−15	28	Division 3 Relegation Playoffs
11	Rynninge (R)	22	6	7	9	35	32	+3	25	Relegation to Division 3
12	Karlslunds IF (R)	22	3	3	16	17	45	−28	12	Relegation to Division 3

Rules for classification: 1) points; 2) goal difference; 3) number of goals scored.
(P) Promoted; (R) Relegated

=== Division 2 Östra Götaland ===
Pos	Team	Pld	W	D	L	GF	GA	GD	Pts	Promotion or relegation
1	Myresjö IF (P)	22	13	3	6	39	23	+16	42	Promotion to Division 1
2	Kalmar AIK	22	8	11	3	29	20	+9	35	Promotion Playoffs
3	Grimsås	22	9	7	6	27	20	+7	34	
4	IK Sleipner	22	9	6	7	28	32	−4	33	
5	Växjö Norra IF	22	9	5	8	28	26	+2	32	
6	Husqvarna FF	22	8	5	9	31	30	+1	29	
7	Älmhult	22	7	7	8	28	29	−1	28	
8	Tord	22	7	7	8	23	24	−1	28	
9	Gullringen	22	8	4	10	25	35	−10	28	
10	Linköping	22	6	8	8	30	32	−2	26	Division 3 Relegation Playoffs
11	Ljungby (R)	22	5	10	7	28	32	−4	25	Relegation to Division 3
12	Färjestaden (R)	22	3	7	12	22	35	−13	16	Relegation to Division 3

Rules for classification: 1) points; 2) goal difference; 3) number of goals scored.
(P) Promoted; (R) Relegated

=== Division 2 Västra Götaland ===
Pos	Team	Pld	W	D	L	GF	GA	GD	Pts	Promotion or relegation
1	Norrby IF (P)	22	15	3	4	61	32	+29	48	Promotion to Division 1
2	Qviding FIF	22	13	7	2	44	24	+20	46	Promotion Playoffs
3	Skövde AIK	22	10	5	7	52	36	+16	35	
4	Holmalunds IF	22	10	5	7	56	43	+13	35	
5	Kongahälla	22	9	8	5	42	36	+6	35	
6	Åsa	22	7	8	7	42	41	+1	29	
7	Tidaholms GIF	22	8	3	11	36	53	−17	27	
8	IFK Uddevalla	22	6	8	8	39	41	−2	26	
9	Jonsered	22	6	8	8	34	40	−6	26	
10	IF Heimer	22	6	2	14	29	41	−12	20	Division 3 Relegation Playoffs
11	Kungsbacka BI (R)	22	5	3	14	23	48	−25	18	Relegation to Division 3
12	Ulvåkers IF (R)	22	3	8	11	24	47	−23	17	Relegation to Division 3

Rules for classification: 1) points; 2) goal difference; 3) number of goals scored.
(P) Promoted; (R) Relegated

=== Division 2 Södra Götaland ===
Pos	Team	Pld	W	D	L	GF	GA	GD	Pts	Promotion or relegation
1	IFK Malmö (P)	22	16	4	2	55	16	+39	52	Promotion to Division 1
2	Högaborg	22	16	3	3	59	22	+37	51	Promotion Playoffs
3	Lunds BK	22	12	3	7	40	24	+16	39	
4	Landskrona BoIS	22	11	5	6	38	23	+15	38	
5	Saxemara	22	9	6	7	38	34	+4	33	
6	IFK Trelleborg	22	8	7	7	33	26	+7	31	
7	Kristianstads FF	22	7	8	7	39	38	+1	29	
8	IF Leikin	22	9	2	11	40	55	−15	29	
9	IS Halmia	22	7	6	9	34	34	0	27	
10	Veberöds AIF	22	7	3	12	27	47	−20	24	Division 3 Relegation Playoffs
11	IFK Karlshamn (R)	22	3	4	15	17	61	−44	13	Relegation to Division 3
12	Karlskrona (R)	22	1	1	20	19	69	−50	4	Relegation to Division 3

Rules for classification: 1) points; 2) goal difference; 3) number of goals scored.
(P) Promoted; (R) Relegated
