= Hillängens IP =

Sports ground in Ludvika, Sweden

Coordinates: 60°9′0″N 15°12′32″E

ABB Arena
- Interactive map of ABB Arena
- Former names: Hillängens IP
- Location: Ludvika, Sweden

Tenant
- Ludvika FK

ABB Arena, formerly known as Hillängens IP, is a football stadium in Ludvika, Sweden and the home stadium for the football team Ludvika FK.
