= Alnö IF =

Swedish football club

- Full name: Alnö Idrottsförening
- Founded: 1924
- Ground: Släda IP; Alnö; Sweden
- Head coach: Pontus Melander
- Coach: Joakim Axelsson
- League: Division 4 Medelpad
- 2010: Division 4 Medelpad, 3rd
| Home colours | Away colours |

Alnö IF is a Swedish football club located in Alnö, just outside Sundsvall in Medelpad.

== Background ==
Alnö Idrottsförening was formed on 24 April 1924 at the Hammarstedts Cafe in Vii. The sports club has been active in skiing, wrestling, boxing, soccer and cross country running. The club currently has approximately 500 members.

Since their foundation Alnö IF has participated mainly in the middle divisions of the Swedish football league system including 24 seasons in the third tier. The club currently plays in Division 4 Medelpad which is the sixth tier of Swedish football. They play their home matches at the Släda IP in Alnö. They also use the Västhagen venue.

Alnö IF are affiliated to the Medelpads Fotbollförbund.

The ladies team has participated for 7 seasons in the Damallsvenskan, the highest ladies league between 1978 and 1984. In 1984 they qualified for the Svenska Cupen final but lost 2–5 against Jitex BK. The men's team played against S.L. Benfica in 1992 in front of 4,300 spectators.

== Season to season ==
| Season | Level | Division | Section | Position | Movements |
|---|---|---|---|---|---|
| 1988 | Tier 4 | Division 3 | Mellersta Norrland | 2nd | |
| 1989 | Tier 4 | Division 3 | Mellersta Norrland | 2nd | |
| 1990 | Tier 4 | Division 3 | Mellersta Norrland | 1st | Promoted |
| 1991 | Tier 3 | Division 2 | Norra Norrland Vårserie | 3rd | |
| | Tier 3 | Division 2 | Hösttvåan Norrland | 3rd | |
| 1992 | Tier 3 | Division 2 | Norra Norrland Vårserie | 3rd | |
| | Tier 3 | Division 2 | Hösttvåan Norrland | 2nd | Promoted |
| 1993 | Tier 3 | Division 2 | Norrland | 6th | |
| 1994 | Tier 3 | Division 2 | Norrland | 12th | Relegated |
| 1995 | Tier 4 | Division 3 | Mellersta Norrland | 2nd | Promotion Playoffs – Promoted |
| 1996 | Tier 3 | Division 2 | Norrland | 12th | Relegated |
| 1997 | Tier 4 | Division 3 | Mellersta Norrland | 12th | Relegated |
| 1998 | Tier 5 | Division 4 | Medelpad | 2nd | Promotion Playoffs |
| 1999 | Tier 5 | Division 4 | Medelpad | 5th | |
| 2000 | Tier 5 | Division 4 | Medelpad | 5th | |
| 2001 | Tier 5 | Division 4 | Medelpad | 2nd | Promotion Playoffs |
| 2002 | Tier 5 | Division 4 | Medelpad | 1st | Promoted |
| 2003 | Tier 4 | Division 3 | Mellersta Norrland | 9th | Relegation Playoffs |
| 2004 | Tier 4 | Division 3 | Mellersta Norrland | 12th | Relegated |
| 2005 | Tier 5 | Division 4 | Medelpad | 5th | |
| 2006* | Tier 6 | Division 4 | Medelpad | 1st | Promoted |
| 2007 | Tier 5 | Division 3 | Mellersta Norrland | 12th | Relegated |
| 2008 | Tier 6 | Division 4 | Medelpad | 7th | |
| 2009 | Tier 6 | Division 4 | Medelpad | 5th | |
| 2010 | Tier 6 | Division 4 | Medelpad | 3rd | |

* League restructuring in 2006 resulted in a new division being created at Tier 3 and subsequent divisions dropping a level.

== Attendances ==
In recent seasons Alnö IF have had the following average attendances:

| Season | Average attendance | Division / Section | Level |
|---|---|---|---|
| 2006 | Not available | Div 4 Medelpad | Tier 6 |
| 2007 | 117 | Div 3 Mellersta Norrland | Tier 5 |
| 2008 | Not available | Div 4 Medelpad | Tier 6 |
| 2009 | 56 | Div 4 Medelpad | Tier 6 |
| 2010 | 58 | Div 4 Medelpad | Tier 6 |

* Attendances are provided in the Publikliga sections of the Svenska Fotbollförbundet website.
