= Grimsås =

- Location within Västra Götaland Location within Sweden
- Coordinates: 57°29′N 13°32′E
- Country: Sweden
- Province: Västergötland
- County: Västra Götaland County
- Municipality: Tranemo Municipality

Area
  - Total: 0.88 km^{2} (0.34 sq mi)

Population (31 December 2010)
  - Total: 721
  - Density: 818/km^{2} (2,120/sq mi)
- Time zone: UTC+1 (CET)
  - Summer (DST): UTC+2 (CEST)
- Climate: Dfb

Grimsås is a locality situated in Tranemo Municipality, Västra Götaland County, Sweden with 721 inhabitants in 2010.

== Sports ==
The following sports clubs are located in Grimsås:

- Grimsås IF
