= Åsa IF =

Swedish football club

- Full name: Åsa Idrottsförening
- Founded: 1919
- Ground: Åsa IP; Åsa; Sweden
- Head coach: Peter Karlsson; Henrik Dehlryd
- League: Division 4 Halland
Home colours	Away colours

Åsa IF is a Swedish football club located in Åsa.

== Background ==
The club was formed following a meeting at the Åsa lantmannaförening (Asa Farmers' Association) on 21 March 1919. The club was named Ölmevalla Gymnastik- och Idrottsförening but this was changed in 1932 to Åsa Idrottsförening.

Åsa IF currently has around 900 members, mainly comprising children and young people living in Åsa which located on the west coast, 20 kilometers south of Kungsbacka. AIF's activities are intended for all who are interested in the sports of table tennis, football and bandy. The club arranges events such as Åsacupen, Åsakalset and Bingo.

Åsa IF currently plays in Division 4 Halland Elit which is the sixth tier of Swedish football. They play their home matches at the Åsa IP in Åsa.

The club is affiliated to Hallands Fotbollförbund.

== Season to season ==
Season	Level	Division	Section	Position	Movements
1981	Tier 4	Division 4	Halland	3rd	
1982	Tier 4	Division 4	Halland	2nd	
1983	Tier 4	Division 4	Halland	1st	Promoted
1984	Tier 3	Division 3	Sydvästra Götaland	2nd	
1985	Tier 3	Division 3	Sydvästra Götaland	5th	
1986	Tier 3	Division 3	Mellersta Götaland	3rd	
1987	Tier 3	Division 2	Västra	10th	
1988	Tier 3	Division 2	Västra	7th	
1989	Tier 3	Division 2	Södra	3rd	
1990	Tier 3	Division 2	Västra	4th	
1991	Tier 3	Division 2	Västra Götaland	2nd	Vårserier (Spring Series)
1991	Tier 3	Division 2	Kvalettan Södra	4th	Höstserier (Autumn Series)
1992	Tier 3	Division 2	Västra Götaland	6th	Vårserier (Spring Series)
1992	Tier 3	Division 2	Hösttvåan – Södra Götaland	7th	Höstserier (Autumn Series) – Relegated
1993	Tier 4	Division 3	Sydvästra Götaland	3rd	
1994	Tier 4	Division 3	Sydvästra Götaland	1st	Promoted
1995	Tier 3	Division 2	Västra Götaland	9th	
1996	Tier 3	Division 2	Västra Götaland	6th	
1997	Tier 3	Division 2	Västra Götaland	6th	
1998	Tier 3	Division 2	Västra Götaland	12th	Relegated
1999	Tier 4	Division 3	Nordvästra Götaland	10th	Relegated
2000	Tier 5	Division 4	Halland	3rd	
2001	Tier 5	Division 4	Halland	6th	
2002	Tier 5	Division 4	Halland	6th	
2003	Tier 5	Division 4	Halland	3rd	
2004	Tier 5	Division 4	Halland	9th	
2005	Tier 5	Division 4	Halland	3rd	
2006*	Tier 6	Division 4	Halland	10th	Relegation Playoffs – Relegated
2007	Tier 7	Division 5	Halland Norra	5th	Promoted
2008	Tier 6b	Division 4	Halland	9th	
2009	Tier 6b	Division 4	Halland	5th	
2010	Tier 6b	Division 4	Halland	2nd	Promoted
2011	Tier 6a	Division 4	Halland Elit	11th	
2012	Tier 7	Division 4	Halland	12th	
2013	Tier 8a	Division 5	Halland	8th	
2014	Tier 8a	Division 5	Halland	7th	
2015	Tier 8a	Division 5	Halland	2nd	
2016	Tier 7	Division 5	Halland	1st	
2017	Tier 6	Division 4	Halland	2nd	
2018	Tier 6	Division 4	Halland	2nd	
2019	Tier 5	Division 3	Sydvästra götaland	9th	
2020	Tier 6	Division 4	Halland	5th	

* League restructuring in 2006 resulted in a new division being created at Tier 3 and subsequent divisions dropping a level.
