= IK Heros =

Sports club in Smedjebacken, Sweden

- Full name: Idrottsklubben Heros
- Sport: bandy, track and field athletics football (earlier)
- Founded: 1915
- Based in: Smedjebacken, Sweden
- Stadium: Herosvallen

IK Heros is a sports club in Smedjebacken, Sweden, established in 1915. The club has bandy and track and field athletics sections, earlier also association football. The men's bandy team has played 11 seasons in the Swedish top division. between 1940 and 1965–1966.

The men's football team has played five seasons in the Swedish third division.
