= IFK Karlshamn =

Swedish football club

- Full name: Idrottsföreningen Kamraterna Karlshamn
- Founded: 1906
- Ground: Vägga IP; Karlshamn; Sweden
- League: Division 2 Östra Götaland
Home colours	Away colours

IFK Karlshamn is a Swedish football club located in Karlshamn.

== Background ==
Idrottsföreningen Kamraterna Karlshamn were formed on 22 July 1906. In addition to football other sports in the early years included athletics, swimming, rowing, shooting, tennis and gymnastics. In the 1920s boxing, wrestling, handball, orienteering and bandy were added.

Football is now the main activity, the first match being played against a foreign team on 12 August 1907. IFK Karlshamn currently plays in Division 4 Blekinge which is the sixth tier of Swedish football. They play their home matches at the Vägga IP in Karlshamn.

The club is affiliated to Blekinge Fotbollförbund. IFK Karlshamn have competed in the Svenska Cupen on 20 occasions.

== Season to season ==
Season	Level	Division	Section	Position	Movements
1993	Tier 3	Division 2	Södra Götaland	4th	
1994	Tier 3	Division 2	Södra Götaland	4th	
1995	Tier 3	Division 2	Södra Götaland	6th	
1996	Tier 3	Division 2	Södra Götaland	11th	Relegated
1997	Tier 4	Division 3	Sydöstra Götaland	3rd	
1998	Tier 4	Division 3	Sydöstra Götaland	4th	
1999	Tier 4	Division 3	Sydöstra Götaland	7th	
2000	Tier 4	Division 3	Sydöstra Götaland	2nd	Promotion Playoffs
2001	Tier 4	Division 3	Sydöstra Götaland	10th	Relegated
2002	Tier 5	Division 4	Blekinge	5th	
2003	Tier 5	Division 4	Blekinge	8th	
2004	Tier 5	Division 4	Blekinge	13th	Relegated
2005	Tier 6	Division 5	Blekinge	5th	
2006*	Tier 7	Division 5	Blekinge	1st	Promoted
2007	Tier 6	Division 4	Blekinge	2nd	Promotion Playoffs
2008	Tier 6	Division 4	Blekinge	3rd	
2009	Tier 6	Division 4	Blekinge	1st	Promoted
2010	Tier 5	Division 3	Sydöstra Götaland	12th	Relegated
2011	Tier 6	Division 4	Blekinge	3rd	
2012	Tier 6	Division 4	Blekinge	2nd	Promotion Playoffs - Not Promoted
2013	Tier 6	Division 4	Blekinge	3rd	
2014	Tier 6	Division 4	Blekinge	1st	Promoted
2015	Tier 5	Division 3	Sydöstra Götaland	10th	Relegated
2016	Tier 6	Division 4	Blekinge	2nd	Promotion Playoffs - Promoted
2017	Tier 5	Division 3	Sydöstra Götaland	6th	
2018	Tier 5	Division 3	Sydöstra Götaland		

* League restructuring in 2006 resulted in a new division being created at Tier 3 and subsequent divisions dropping a level.
