= IFK Strömstad =

Swedish football club

- Full name: Idrottsföreningen Kamraterna Strömstad
- Founded: 1907
- Ground: Strömsvallen; Strömstad; Sweden
- Chairman: Kjell Johansson
- League: Division 5 Bohuslän/Dalsland västra
Home colours

IFK Strömstad is a Swedish football club located in Strömstad.

== Background ==
IFK Strömstad currently (2026) plays in Division 5 Bohuslän/Dalsland västra which is the seventh tier of Swedish football. The club's best seasons were in 1987 and 1988 when they finished second in Division 2 Västra. They play their home matches at the Strömsvallen in Strömstad.

The club is affiliated to Bohusläns Fotbollförbund. IFK Strömstad have competed in the Svenska Cupen on 17 occasions and have played 26 matches in the competition.

== Season to season ==
Season	Level	Division	Section	Position	Movements
1985	Tier 4	Division 4	Bohuslän/Dalsland	1st	Promoted
1986	Tier 3	Division 3	Nordvästra Götaland	4th	
1987*	Tier 3	Division 2	Västra	2nd	
1988	Tier 3	Division 2	Västra	2nd	
1989	Tier 3	Division 2	Västra	4th	
1990	Tier 3	Division 2	Västra	10th	
1991	Tier 3	Division 2	Mellersta Götaland	7th	Vårserier (Spring Series)
	Tier 3	Division 2	Västra Götaland	4th	Höstserier (Autumn Series)
1992	Tier 3	Division 2	Mellersta Götaland	6th	Vårserier (Spring Series)
	Tier 3	Division 2	Västra Götaland	5th	Höstserier (Autumn Series)
1993	Tier 3	Division 2	Västra Götaland	11th	Relegated
1994	Tier 4	Division 3	Nordvästra Götaland	10th	Relegated
1995	Tier 5	Division 4	Bohuslän/Dalsland	2nd	Promotion Playoffs
1996	Tier 5	Division 4	Bohuslän/Dalsland	10th	Relegated
1997	Tier 6	Division 5	Bohuslän		
1998	Tier 6	Division 5	Bohuslän		Promoted
1999	Tier 5	Division 4	Bohuslän/Dalsland	8th	
2000	Tier 5	Division 4	Bohuslän/Dalsland	7th	
2001	Tier 5	Division 4	Bohuslän/Dalsland	12th	Relegated
2002	Tier 6	Division 5	Bohuslän	1st	Promoted
2003	Tier 5	Division 4	Bohuslän/Dalsland	11th	Relegated
2004	Tier 6	Division 5	Bohuslän	3rd	
2005	Tier 6	Division 5	Bohuslän	3rd	
2006**	Tier 7	Division 5	Bohuslän	2nd	Promoted
2007	Tier 6	Division 4	Bohuslän/Dalsland	3rd	
2008	Tier 6	Division 4	Bohuslän/Dalsland	7th	
2009	Tier 6	Division 4	Bohuslän/Dalsland	8th	
2010	Tier 6	Division 4	Bohuslän/Dalsland	3rd	
2011	Tier 6	Division 4	Bohuslän/Dalsland	11th	Relegated
2012	Tier 7	Division 5	Bohuslän	8th	
2013	Tier 7	Division 5	Bohuslän	9th	
2014	Tier 7	Division 5	Bohuslän	6th	
2015	Tier 7	Division 5	Bohuslän	7th	
2016	Tier 7	Division 5	Bohuslän	11th	Relegated
2017	Tier 8	Division 6	Norra Bohuslän	1st	Promoted
2018	Tier 7	Division 5	Bohuslän	2nd	
2019	Tier 7	Division 5	Bohuslän	2nd	Promoted
2020	Tier 6	Division 4	Bohuslän/Dalsland	9th	
2021	Tier 6	Division 4	Bohuslän/Dalsland	11th	Relegated
2022	Tier 7	Division 5	Bohuslän	1st	Promoted
2023	Tier 6	Division 4	Bohuslän/Dalsland	11th	Relegated
2024	Tier 7	Division 5	Bohuslän	4th	
2025	Tier 7	Division 5	Bohuslän/Dalsland norra	4th	
2026	Tier 7	Division 5	Bohuslän/Dalsland västra		

* League restructuring in 1987 resulted in a new division being created at Tier 2 and subsequent divisions dropping a level. ** League restructuring in 2006 resulted in a new division being created at Tier 3 and subsequent divisions dropping a level.
