= Forssa BK =

Swedish football club

- Forssa Bollklubb
- Full name: Forssa Bollklubb
- Nickname: Forssa BK
- Short name: Forssa
- Founded: 1934
- Ground: Maservallen; Borlänge; Sweden
- Chairman: Anders Wiklund
- Head coach: Elvan Cicen
- League: Division 4 Dalarna
Home colours	Away colours

Forssa BK is a Swedish football club located in Borlänge, Sweden.

== Background ==
Forssa Bollklubb were founded on 16 April 1934 at Hushagens school. The club played their first match on 17 May 1934, winning 4–0 against IK Fylking. In 1978 the club played the biggest match in their history against Hammarby IF in the Scandia Cup. Forssa BK lost 1–5 before a crowd of 1,240.

Forssa BK currently plays in Division 4 Dalarna which is the sixth tier of Swedish football. They play their home matches at the Maservallen in Borlänge.

The club is affiliated to Dalarnas Fotbollförbund. Forssa BK have competed in the Svenska Cupen on 25 occasions and have played 63 matches in the competition.

== Season to season ==
Season	Level	Division	Section	Position	Movements
1985	Tier 3	Division 3	Södra Norrland	3rd	
1986	Tier 3	Division 3	Södra Norrland	2nd	
1987*	Tier 3	Division 2	Norra	4th	
1988	Tier 3	Division 2	Norra	11th	
1989	Tier 3	Division 2	Östra	10th	
1990	Tier 3	Division 2	Norra	8th	
1991	Tier 3	Division 2	Södra Norrland	6th	Vårserier (Spring Series)
	Tier 3	Division 2	Västra Svealand	4th	Höstserier (Autumn Series)
1992	Tier 3	Division 2	Södra Norrland	7th	Vårserier (Spring Series)
	Tier 3	Division 2	Västra Svealand	7th	Höstserier (Autumn Series) – Relegated
1993	Tier 4	Division 3	Södra Norrland	5th	
1994	Tier 4	Division 3	Södra Norrland	8th	
1995	Tier 4	Division 3	Södra Norrland	4th	
1996	Tier 4	Division 3	Södra Norrland	4th	
1997	Tier 4	Division 3	Södra Norrland	3rd	
1998	Tier 4	Division 3	Södra Norrland	9th	
1999	Tier 4	Division 3	Södra Norrland	7th	
2000	Tier 4	Division 3	Södra Norrland	8th	
2001	Tier 4	Division 3	Södra Norrland	1st	Promoted
2002	Tier 3	Division 2	Östra Svealand	10th	Relegation Playoffs
2003	Tier 3	Division 2	Västra Svealand	12th	Relegated
2004	Tier 4	Division 3	Södra Norrland	5th	
2005	Tier 4	Division 3	Södra Norrland	4th	
2006**	Tier 5	Division 3	Södra Norrland	11th	Relegated
2007	Tier 6	Division 4	Dalarna	5th	
2008	Tier 6	Division 4	Dalarna	6th	
2009	Tier 6	Division 4	Dalarna	8th	
2010	Tier 6	Division 4	Dalarna	7th	
2011	Tier 6	Division 4	Dalarna	1st	Promoted

* League restructuring in 1987 resulted in a new division being created at Tier 2 and subsequent divisions dropping a level. ** League restructuring in 2006 resulted in a new division being created at Tier 3 and subsequent divisions dropping a level.
