= KB Karlskoga FF =

Swedish football club

- Full name: KB Karlskoga Fotbollförening
- Founded: 1963
- Ground: Nobelstadion; Karlskoga; Sweden
- Capacity: 10,000
- Head coach: Mark Selmer
- League: Division 2 Norra Götaland
- 2010: Division 2 Västra Götaland, 5th
Home colours	Away colours

KB Karlskoga FF is a Swedish football club located in Karlskoga. The club was founded in 1963 following the merger of IFK Bofors and Karlskoga IF. KB means Karlskoga/Bofors.

== Background ==
Since their foundation in 1963 KB Karlskoga FF has participated mainly in the middle and lower divisions of the Swedish football league system. Sven-Göran Eriksson and Tord Grip both played for the club in the early 1970s, the latter as player-coach. The club currently plays in Division 2 Västra Götaland which is the fourth tier of Swedish football. They play their home matches at the Nobelstadion in Karlskoga.

The club is affiliated to the Värmlands Fotbollförbund.

== Season to season ==
Season	Level	Division	Section	Position	Movements
1993	Tier 3	Division 2	Västra Svealand	12th	Relegated
1994	Tier 4	Division 3	Västra Svealand	8th	
1995	Tier 4	Division 3	Västra Svealand	8th	
1996	Tier 4	Division 3	Västra Svealand	7th	
1997	Tier 4	Division 3	Västra Svealand	8th	
1998	Tier 4	Division 3	Västra Svealand	2nd	Promotion Playoffs – Promoted
1999	Tier 3	Division 2	Västra Svealand	8th	
2000	Tier 3	Division 2	Västra Svealand	8th	
2001	Tier 3	Division 2	Västra Svealand	11th	Relegated
2002	Tier 4	Division 3	Västra Svealand	8th	
2003	Tier 4	Division 3	Västra Svealand	11th	Relegated
2004	Tier 5	Division 4	Värmland	2nd	Promotion Playoffs
2005	Tier 5	Division 4	Värmland	1st	Promoted
2006*	Tier 5	Division 3	Västra Svealand	1st	Promoted
2007	Tier 4	Division 2	Östra Svealand	9th	
2008	Tier 4	Division 2	Östra Svealand	7th	
2009	Tier 4	Division 2	Östra Götaland	6th	
2010	Tier 4	Division 2	Västra Götaland	5th	
2011	Tier 4	Division 2	Norra Götaland	10th	Relegation Playoffs

* League restructuring in 2006 resulted in a new division being created at Tier 3 and subsequent divisions dropping a level.
