= Grimsås IF =

Swedish football club

- Full name: Grimsås Idrottsförening
- Founded: 1932
- Ground: Grimsborg; Grimsås; Sweden
- Chairman: Thomas Björkstål
- League: Division 4 Västergötland Södra
Home colours

Grimsås IF is a Swedish football club located in Grimsås.

== Background ==
Grimsås IF currently plays in Division 4 Västergötland Södra which is the sixth tier of Swedish football. They play their home matches at the Grimsborg in Grimsås.

The club is affiliated with Västergötlands Fotbollförbund.

A producer known from Eurovision, Stefan Örn, played for the club in his younger years.

== Season to season ==
Season	Level	Division	Section	Position	Movements
1993	Tier 3	Division 2	Östra Götaland	5th	
1994	Tier 3	Division 2	Östra Götaland	8th	
1995	Tier 3	Division 2	Östra Götaland	8th	
1996	Tier 3	Division 2	Östra Götaland	3rd	
1997	Tier 3	Division 2	Östra Götaland	9th	
1998	Tier 3	Division 2	Östra Götaland	6th	
1999	Tier 3	Division 2	Östra Götaland	4th	
2000	Tier 3	Division 2	Östra Götaland	8th	
2001	Tier 3	Division 2	Östra Götaland	4th	
2002	Tier 3	Division 2	Östra Götaland	8th	
2003	Tier 3	Division 2	Östra Götaland	8th	
2004	Tier 3	Division 2	Östra Götaland	7th	
2005	Tier 3	Division 2	Östra Götaland	8th	
2006*	Tier 4	Division 2	Mellersta Götaland	10th	Relegation Playoffs – Relegated
2007	Tier 5	Division 3	Nordöstra Götaland	3rd	
2008	Tier 5	Division 3	Mellersta Götaland	3rd	
2009	Tier 5	Division 3	Mellersta Götaland	10th	Relegated
2010	Tier 6	Division 4	Västergötland Södra	9th	
2011	Tier 6	Division 4	Västergötland Södra		

* League restructuring in 2006 resulted in a new division being created at Tier 3 and subsequent divisions dropping a level.
