= Mjölby AI FF =

Swedish football club

- Full name: Mjölby Allmänna Idrottsförening Fotbollförening
- Founded: 26 May 1912
- Ground: Vifolkavallen; Mjölby; Sweden
- Chairman: Tommy Isacsson
- League: Division 4 Östergötland Västra
Home colours

Mjölby AI FF is a Swedish football club located in Mjölby.

== Background ==
Mjölby AI FF currently plays in Division 4 Östergötland Västra which is the sixth tier of Swedish football. They play their home matches at the Vifolkavallen in Mjölby.

The club are affiliated to Östergötlands Fotbollförbund. Mjölby AI FF played in the 2009 Svenska Cupen but lost 2–4 at home to Vetlanda FF in the preliminary round.

== Season to season ==
In their most successful period Mjölby AIF competed in the following divisions:

Season	Level	Division	Section	Position	Movements
1928–29	Tier 3	Division 3	Södra Mellansvenska	3rd	
1929–30	Tier 3	Division 3	Södra Mellansvenska	2nd	
1930–31	Tier 3	Division 3	Södra Mellansvenska	1st	Promotion Playoffs – Promoted
1931–32	Tier 2	Division 2	Södra	7th	
1932–33	Tier 2	Division 2	Östra	5th	
1933–34	Tier 2	Division 2	Östra	6th	
1934–35	Tier 2	Division 2	Östra	2nd	
1935–36	Tier 2	Division 2	Östra	7th	
1936–37	Tier 2	Division 2	Östra	8th	
1937–38	Tier 2	Division 2	Östra	6th	
1938–39	Tier 2	Division 2	Östra	5th	
1939–40	Tier 2	Division 2	Östra	4th	
1940–41	Tier 2	Division 2	Östra	8th	
1941–42	Tier 2	Division 2	Östra	10th	Relegated
1942–43	Tier 3	Division 3	Mellansvenska Norra	9th	Relegated
1943–44	Tier 4	Division 4			Promoted
1944–45	Tier 3	Division 3	Mellansvenska Norra	4th	
1945–46	Tier 3	Division 3	Mellansvenska Norra	5th	
1946–47	Tier 3	Division 3	Mellansvenska Norra	2nd	Playoffs – Relegated (restructuring)

In recent seasons Mjölby AI FF have competed in the following divisions:

Season	Level	Division	Section	Position	Movements
1993	Tier 3	Division 2	Östra Götaland	11th	Relegated
1994	Tier 4	Division 3	Nordöstra Götaland	1st	Promoted
1995	Tier 3	Division 2	Östra Götaland	11th	Relegated
1996	Tier 4	Division 3	Nordöstra Götaland	4th	
1997	Tier 4	Division 3	Nordöstra Götaland	11th	Relegated
1998	Tier 5	Division 4	Östergötland Västra	6th	
1999	Tier 5	Division 4	Östergötland Västra	1st	Promoted
2000	Tier 4	Division 3	Nordöstra Götaland	4th	
2001	Tier 4	Division 3	Nordöstra Götaland	2nd	Promotion Playoffs
2002	Tier 4	Division 3	Nordöstra Götaland	5th	
2003	Tier 4	Division 3	Nordöstra Götaland	3rd	
2004	Tier 4	Division 3	Nordöstra Götaland	7th	
2005	Tier 4	Division 3	Nordöstra Götaland	8th	
2006*	Tier 5	Division 3	Nordöstra Götaland	5th	
2007	Tier 5	Division 3	Nordöstra Götaland	5th	
2008	Tier 5	Division 3	Nordöstra Götaland	10th	Relegated
2009	Tier 6	Division 4	Östergötland Västra	1st	Promoted
2010	Tier 5	Division 3	Nordöstra Götaland	11th	Relegated
2011	Tier 6	Division 4	Östergötland Västra		

* League restructuring in 2006 resulted in a new division being created at Tier 3 and subsequent divisions dropping a level.
