= IK Tord =

Swedish football club

- Full name: Idrottsklubben Tord
- Founded: 14 October 1919; 106 years ago
- Ground: Rosenlunds IP; Jönköping; Sweden
- Capacity: 5,200
- Head coach: Niclas Tagesson
- Coach: Marcus Vaapil
- League: Division 2 Nordvästra Götaland
- 2021: Division 2 Västra Götaland, 15th (Relegated)
Home colours	Away colours

IK Tord is a Swedish football club located in Rosenlund in Jönköping. The club was formed on 10 September 1919 and has specialised in football and baseball.

== Background ==
Since their foundation IK Tord has participated mainly in the middle divisions of the Swedish football league system. They play their home matches at Rosenlunds IP.

IK Tord have a thriving section running many youth teams of various age groups, from toddlers to juniors. They also ran ladies teams before this section broke away in 1990 to form IFK Jönköping.

IK Tord are affiliated to the Smålands Fotbollförbund.

== Season to season ==
Season	Level	Division	Section	Position	Movements
1993	Tier 4	Division 3	Sydvästra Götaland	2nd	Promotion Playoffs
1994	Tier 4	Division 3	Sydvästra Götaland	4th	
1995	Tier 4	Division 3	Mellersta Götaland	1st	Promoted
1996	Tier 3	Division 2	Östra Götaland	8th	
1997	Tier 3	Division 2	Östra Götaland	6th	
1998	Tier 3	Division 2	Östra Götaland	9th	
1999	Tier 3	Division 2	Östra Götaland	8th	
2000	Tier 3	Division 2	Östra Götaland	3rd	
2001	Tier 3	Division 2	Östra Götaland	3rd	
2002	Tier 3	Division 2	Östra Götaland	4th	
2003	Tier 3	Division 2	Östra Götaland	7th	
2004	Tier 3	Division 2	Östra Götaland	10th	Relegation Playoffs – Relegated
2005	Tier 4	Division 3	Nordöstra Götaland	2nd	Promoted
2006*	Tier 4	Division 2	Mellersta Götaland	6th	
2007	Tier 4	Division 2	Mellersta Götaland	9th	
2008	Tier 4	Division 2	Östra Götaland	12th	Relegated
2009	Tier 5	Division 3	Nordöstra Götaland	2nd	Promotion Playoffs – Promoted
2010	Tier 4	Division 2	Östra Götaland	4th	
2011	Tier 4	Division 2	Västra Götaland	6th	
2012	Tier 4	Division 2	Östra Götaland	10th	Relegation Playoffs – Relegated
2013	Tier 5	Division 3	Nordöstra Götaland	5th	
2014	Tier 5	Division 3	Mellersta Götaland	4th	
2015	Tier 5	Division 3	Sydvästra Götaland	7th	
2016	Tier 5	Division 3	Nordöstra Götaland	5th	
2017	Tier 5	Division 3	Nordöstra Götaland	8th	
2018	Tier 5	Division 3	Nordöstra Götaland	3rd	
2019	Tier 5	Division 3	Nordöstra Götaland	1st	Promoted
2020	Tier 4	Division 2	Östra Götaland	10th	
2021	Tier 4	Division 2	Västra Götaland	15th	Relegated

* League restructuring in 2006 resulted in a new division being created at Tier 3 and subsequent divisions dropping a level.

== Attendances ==
In recent seasons IK Tord have had the following average attendances:

Season	Average attendance	Division / Section	Level
2005	140	Div 3 Nordöstra Götaland	Tier 3
2006	199	Div 2 Mellersta Götaland	Tier 4
2007	166	Div 2 Mellersta Götaland	Tier 4
2008	120	Div 2 Östra Götaland	Tier 4
2009	156	Div 3 Nordöstra Götaland	Tier 5
2010	178	Div 2 Östra Götaland	Tier 4
2011	180	Div 2 Västra Götaland	Tier 4
2012	207	Div 2 Östra Götaland	Tier 4
2013	117	Div 3 Nordöstra Götaland	Tier 5
2014	113	Div 3 Mellersta Götaland	Tier 5
2015	110	Div 3 Sydvästra Götaland	Tier 5
2016	150	Div 3 Nordöstra Götaland	Tier 5
2017	90	Div 3 Nordöstra Götaland	Tier 5
2018	141	Div 3 Nordöstra Götaland	Tier 5
2019	?	Div 3 Nordöstra Götaland	Tier 5
2020	?	Div 2 Östra Götaland	Tier 4

* Attendances are provided in the Publikliga sections of the Svenska Fotbollförbundet website.
