= Ope IF =

Swedish football club

- Full name: Ope Idrottsförening
- Founded: 1922
- Ground: Torvallens IP and Jämtkraft Arena; Östersund; Sweden
- Chairman: Christer Engnér
- Head coach: Leif Widegren
- League: Division 4 Jämtland Härjedalen
- 2009: Division 4 Jämtland/Härjedalen, 2nd (Promoted)
Home colours

Ope IF is a Swedish football club located in Ope near Östersund in Jämtland.

== Background ==
Ope Idrottsförening is a sports club near Östersund that was founded on 30 January 1922. Football is the main activity today but in the past the club has also specialised in Nordic skiing, bandy and gymnastics. The bandy department was made its own club in 1974, called Östersunds BS.

Since their foundation Ope IF has participated mainly in the upper and middle divisions of the Swedish football league system. The club's heyday was in the 1970s and the first half of the 1980s when they played in Division 2, which at that time was the second tier of Swedish football. In 1993 the club played one season in Division 1, which also represented second-tier football at that time.

In 1996/1997 the Ope IF, IFK Östersund, Ostersund / Torvalla FF clubs decided to work together on a joint venture to establish an elite new football club named Östersunds FK. Ope IF gave their place in the league Div 2 Norrland to Östersunds FK. Ostersund / Torvalla FF withdrew from the league in Division 4 and transferred their place to Ope IF. On occasions Ope IF has since played up to Division 3 in the same section as IFK Östersund.

In 2010 the Ope IF played in Division 3 Mellersta Norrland which is the fifth tier of Swedish football. They finished in a relegation position and therefore in 2011 will participate in Division 4. They play their home matches at the Torvallens IP to the south of Östersund, near the village of Ope. Matches have also been played at the Jämtkraft Arena in Östersund.

Ope IF are affiliated to the Jämtland-Härjedalens FF.

== Season to season ==
Season	Level	Division	Section	Position	Movements
1993	Tier 2	Division 1	Norra	12th	Relegated
1994	Tier 3	Division 2	Norrland	4th	
1995	Tier 3	Division 2	Norrland	3rd	
1996	Tier 3	Division 2	Norrland	3rd	
1997	Tier 5	Division 4	Jämtland/Härjedalen	6th	Ope IF/ÖTFF
1998	Tier 5	Division 4	Jämtland/Härjedalen	1st	Promoted
1999	Tier 4	Division 3	Mellersta Norrland	10th	Relegated
2000	Tier 5	Division 4	Jämtland/Härjedalen	2nd	Promotion Playoffs
2001	Tier 5	Division 4	Jämtland/Härjedalen	2nd	Promotion Playoffs
2002	Tier 5	Division 4	Jämtland/Härjedalen	7th	
2003	Tier 5	Division 4	Jämtland/Härjedalen	1st	Promoted
2004	Tier 4	Division 3	Mellersta Norrland	8th	
2005	Tier 4	Division 3	Mellersta Norrland	7th	
2006*	Tier 5	Division 3	Mellersta Norrland	7th	
2007	Tier 5	Division 3	Mellersta Norrland	11th	Relegated
2008	Tier 6	Division 4	Jämtland/Härjedalen	4th	
2009	Tier 6	Division 4	Jämtland/Härjedalen	2nd	Promoted
2010	Tier 5	Division 3	Mellersta Norrland	11th	Relegated

* League restructuring in 2006 resulted in a new division being created at Tier 3 and subsequent divisions dropping a level.

== Attendances ==
In recent seasons Ope IF have had the following average attendances:

Season	Average attendance	Division / Section	Level
2005	134	Div 3 Mellersta Norrland	Tier 4
2006	150	Div 3 Mellersta Norrland	Tier 5
2007	130	Div 3 Mellersta Norrland	Tier 5
2008	Not available	Div 4 Jämtland/Härjedalen	Tier 6
2009	Not available	Div 4 Jämtland/Härjedalen	Tier 6
2010	199	Div 3 Mellersta Norrland	Tier 5

* Attendances are provided in the Publikliga sections of the Svenska Fotbollförbundet website.

In 1972 Ope played Manchester City in a friendly at Hofvallen in front of 5,500 spectators. In 2010 there were 679 spectators at the derby match with IFK Östersund.
