= Spånga IS =

Swedish football club

Spånga IS FK
- Full name: Spånga Idrottssällskap Fotbollklubb
- Founded: 1929
- Ground: Spånga IP; Spånga; Sweden
- Chairman: Björn Begner
- League: Division 3 Norra Svealand
- 2021: Division 3 Södra Svealand, 8th
- Website: www.spangafotboll.se
Home colours	Away colours

Spånga IS FK is a Swedish football club located in Spånga. Spånga play in the 5th tier of Swedish Football.

== Background ==
Spånga IS FK currently plays in Division 3 Stockholm Mellersta which is the fifth tier of Swedish football. They play their home matches at the Spånga IP in Spånga.

The club is affiliated to Stockholms Fotbollförbund.

The club also used to run a bandy department, but this has now merged with the bandy department of Djurgårdens IF.

== Season to season ==
Season	Level	Division	Section	Position	Movements
1993	Tier 2	Division 1	Norra	10th	
1994	Tier 2	Division 1	Norra	12th	Relegated
1995	Tier 3	Division 2	Östra Svealand	5th	Relegated – financial irregularities
1996	Tier 4	Division 3	Norra Svealand	3rd	
1997	Tier 4	Division 3	Norra Svealand	2nd	Promotion Playoffs – Promoted
1998	Tier 3	Division 2	Västra Svealand	5th	
1999	Tier 3	Division 2	Västra Svealand	5th	
2000	Tier 3	Division 2	Västra Svealand	11th	Relegated
2001	Tier 4	Division 3	Norra Svealand	6th	
2002	Tier 4	Division 3	Norra Svealand	9th	
2003	Tier 4	Division 3	Östra Svealand	7th	
2004	Tier 4	Division 3	Östra Svealand	3rd	
2005	Tier 4	Division 3	Norra Svealand	5th	
2006*	Tier 5	Division 3	Norra Svealand	7th	
2007	Tier 5	Division 3	Norra Svealand	4th	
2008	Tier 5	Division 3	Norra Svealand	2nd	Promotion Playoffs – Promoted
2009	Tier 4	Division 2	Södra Svealand	11th	Relegated
2010	Tier 5	Division 3	Norra Svealand	9th	Relegation Playoffs – Relegated
2011	Tier 6	Division 4	Stockholm Mellersta	6th	
2012	Tier 6	Division 4	Stockholm Mellersta	8th	
2013	Tier 6	Division 4	Stockholm Norra	5th	
2014	Tier 6	Division 4	Stockholm Norra	3rd	
2015	Tier 6	Division 4	Stockholm Norra	2nd	Promotion Playoffs - Not Promoted
2016	Tier 6	Division 4	Stockholm Norra	2nd	Promotion Playoffs - Not Promoted
2017	Tier 6	Division 4	Stockholm Norra	4th	
2018	Tier 6	Division 4	Stockholm Norra	7th	
2019	Tier 6	Division 4	Stockholm Norra	2nd	Promotion Playoffs -Promoted
2020	Tier 5	Division 3	Norra Svealand	9th	
2021	Tier 5	Division 3	Södra Svealand	8th	

* League restructuring in 2006 resulted in a new division being created at Tier 3 and subsequent divisions dropping a level.

== Attendances ==
In recent seasons Spånga IS FK have had the following average attendances:

Season	Average attendance	Division / Section	Level
2005	102	Div 3 Norra Svealand	Tier 4
2006	74	Div 3 Norra Svealand	Tier 5
2007	73	Div 3 Norra Svealand	Tier 5
2008	101	Div 3 Norra Svealand	Tier 5
2009	134	Div 2 Södra Svealand	Tier 4
2010	78	Div 3 Norra Svealand	Tier 5
2011	Not Available	Div 4 Stockholm Mellersta	Tier 6
2012	Not Available	Div 4 Stockholm Mellersta	Tier 6
2013	65	Div 4 Stockholm Norra	Tier 6
2014	62	Div 4 Stockholm Norra	Tier 6
2015	54	Div 4 Stockholm Norra	Tier 6
2016	46	Div 4 Stockholm Norra	Tier 6
2017	91	Div 4 Stockholm Norra	Tier 6
2018	53	Div 4 Stockholm Norra	Tier 6
2019		Div 4 Stockholm Norra	Tier 6

* Attendances are provided in the Publikliga sections of the Svenska Fotbollförbundet website.

== Notable Managers ==
- (Sweden) Tommy Söderberg
- (Sweden) Kenneth Ohlsson
