= Hudiksvalls FF =

Association football club

- Full name: Hudiksvalls Förenade Fotboll
- Short name: HuFF
- Founded: 1931 as Hudiksvalls ABK
- Ground: Glysisvallen; Hudiksvall; Sweden
- Capacity: 3,000
- League: Division 2 Norra Svealand
- 2019: Division 2 Norrland, 5th
Home colours	Away colours

Hudiksvalls FF is a Swedish football club located in Hudiksvall. The club was known as Hudiksvalls ABK, but changed their name, badge and colors in 2011.

== Background ==
Since their foundation in 1931 Hudiksvalls FF has participated mainly in the middle divisions of the Swedish football league system. The club plays in Division 2 Norrland which is the fourth tier of Swedish football. They play their home matches at the arena Glysisvallen in Hudiksvall.

Hudiksvalls FF are affiliated to the Hälsinglands Fotbollförbund.

== Season to season ==
Season	Level	Division	Section	Position	Movements
1993	Tier 3	Division 2	Norrland	12th	Relegated
1994	Tier 4	Division 3	Södra Norrland	1st	Promoted
1995	Tier 3	Division 2	Östra Svealand	8th	
1996	Tier 3	Division 2	Östra Svealand	7th	
1997	Tier 3	Division 2	Norrland	5th	
1998	Tier 3	Division 2	Norrland	6th	
1999	Tier 3	Division 2	Östra Svealand	11th	Relegated
2000	Tier 4	Division 3	Södra Norrland	5th	
2001	Tier 4	Division 3	Södra Norrland	2nd	Promotion Playoffs
2002	Tier 4	Division 3	Södra Norrland	3rd	
2003	Tier 4	Division 3	Södra Norrland	6th	
2004	Tier 4	Division 3	Södra Norrland	2nd	Promotion Playoffs
2005	Tier 4	Division 3	Södra Norrland	1st	Promoted
2006*	Tier 4	Division 2	Norrland	5th	
2007	Tier 4	Division 2	Norra Svealand	6th	
2008	Tier 4	Division 2	Norra Svealand	12th	Relegated
2009	Tier 5	Division 3	Södra Norrland	1st	Promoted
2010	Tier 4	Division 2	Norra Svealand	8th	
2011	Tier 4	Division 2	Norrland	2nd	
2012	Tier 4	Division 2	Norra Svealand	5th	
2013	Tier 4	Division 2	Norrland	4th	
2014	Tier 4	Division 2	Norrland	2nd	
2015	Tier 4	Division 2	Norrland	2nd	
2016	Tier 4	Division 2	Norrland	2nd	Promotion Playoffs
2017	Tier 4	Division 2	Norrland	Unattached	

* League restructuring in 2006 resulted in a new division being created at Tier 3 and subsequent divisions dropping a level.
