= Gimonäs CK =

Swedish cycling and football club

- Full name: Gimonäs Cykelklubb
- Founded: 1934
- Ground: Gimoborg IP, Umeå
- Capacity: N/A
| Home colours | Away colours |

Gimonäs CK is a Swedish cycling and football club located in Gimonäs in Umeå. The club, formed in 1934, currently has no men's football section as it was disbanded after the 2005 season.
