= Ludvika FK =

Swedish football club

- Full name: Ludvika Fotbollklubb
- Nickname: LFK
- Founded: 1975
- Ground: Hillängens IP; Ludvika; Sweden
- Chairman: Peter Björk
- Coach: Magnus Edberg; Mattias Johansson
- League: Division 4 Dalarna
- 2014: Division 3 Västra Svealand 12th (Relegated)
- Website: http://www.ludvikafotboll.se/
Home colours	Away colours

Ludvika FK is a Swedish football club located in Ludvika in Dalarna County.

== Background ==
Since their foundation Ludvika FK has participated mainly in the upper and middle divisions of the Swedish football league system. The club plays in Division 3 Västra Svealand which is the fifth tier of Swedish football. They play their home matches at the Hillängens IP in Ludvika.

Ludvika FK are affiliated to Dalarnas Fotbollförbund.

Ludvika FK played in the Allsvenskan in season 1944/45, but were called Ludvika FfI at that time.

Stars of today is Albin Lindblom #19 and Benjamin Scheir #1

== Recent history ==
In recent seasons Ludvika FK have competed in the following divisions:

2014 – Division III, Västra Svealand
2013 – Division IV, Dalarna
2012 – Division IV, Dalarna
2011 – Division III, Västra Svealand
2010 – Division III, Västra Svealand
2009 – Division IV, Dalarna
2008 – Division III, Västra Svealand
2007 – Division III, Södra Norrland
2006 – Division III, Västra Svealand
2005 – Division III, Västra Svealand
2004 – Division II, Västra Svealand
2003 – Division II, Västra Svealand
2002 – Division II, Västra Svealand
2001 – Division III, Västra Svealand
2000 – Division III, Västra Svealand
1999 – Division II, Västra Svealand
1998 – Division I, Norra
1997 – Division II, Västra Svealand
1996 – Division II, Västra Svealand
1995 – Division II, Västra Svealand
1994 – Division II, Västra Svealand
1993 – Division II, Västra Svealand

== Attendances ==
Ludvika FK have had the following average attendances:

Season	Average attendance	Division / Section	Level
2001	346	Div 3 Västra Svealand	Tier 4
2002	302	Div 2 Västra Svealand	Tier 3
2003	407	Div 2 Västra Svealand	Tier 3
2004	210	Div 2 Västra Svealand	Tier 3
2005	134	Div 3 Västra Svealand	Tier 4
2006	171	Div 3 Västra Svealand	Tier 5
2007	256	Div 3 Södra Norrland	Tier 5
2008	133	Div 3 Västra Svealand	Tier 5
2009	250	Div 4 Dalarna	Tier 6
2010	203	Div 3 Västra Svealand	Tier 5
2011	153	Div 3 Västra Svealand	Tier 5
2012	96	Div 4 Dalarna	Tier 6
2013	158	Div 4 Dalarna	Tier 6
2014	95	Div 3 Västra Svealand	Tier 5

* Attendances are provided in the Publikliga sections of the Svenska Fotbollförbundet website and European Football Statistics website.
