= Karlslunds IF =

Swedish sports club

- Full name: Karlslunds idrottsförening
- Sport: Bandy, baseball, Bowling gymnastics, swimming, skiing, football, softball, American football
- Founded: 20 April 1920
- Based in: Örebro, Sweden
- Arena: Karlslunds IP

Karlslunds IF is a Swedish sports club with several departments, located in Örebro.

Karlslunds IF runs one of the biggest programme for athletics in Örebro, Sweden, with some 4000 members and more than 200 coaches coaching eight different sports. Currently women's football (known as KIF Örebro DFF) and skiing have the most successful teams.

== History ==
The club was founded on April 27, 1920 by a group of young athletes living in the Karlslund area in western Örebro. With an original focus on athletics, skiing and football, the club quickly branched into other sports, becoming one of Örebro's most successful sports clubs of the 20th and 21st century.

== Sports ==
- Bandy: Karlslunds IF Bandy
- Baseball and softball: KIF Eagles Baseball & Softball
- Bowling: Karlslunds IF Bowling
- Men's football: Karlslunds IF FK
- Women's football: KIF Örebro DFF
- Gymnastics: Örebro Gymnastikförening - KIF
- Skiing: Karlslunds IF Skiing
- Swimming: Örebro Simallians
- American football: Karlsunds IF American football
