= 1991 Division 1 (Swedish football) =

Swedish League Division 1
- Season: 1991
- Champions: Kiruna FF; Hammarby IF; Västra Frölunda IF; Trelleborgs FF
- Premiers: Östers IF
- Promoted: Trelleborgs FF; Västra Frölunda IF
- Relegated: Västerås SK; Jonsereds IF; Örgryte IS; Markaryds IF; IF Brommapojkarna; Mjölby AI; Kalmar AIK

Statistics of Swedish football Division 1 in season 1991.

== Spring ==
=== Norra ===
Pos	Team	Pld	W	D	L	GF	GA	GD	Pts
1	Kiruna FF	14	8	2	4	22	19	+3	26
2	IFK Luleå	14	8	1	5	25	17	+8	25
3	Västerås SK	14	7	4	3	19	17	+2	25
4	IK Brage	14	5	4	5	15	15	0	19
5	Enköpings SK	14	3	7	4	23	22	+1	16
6	IFK Sundsvall	14	4	3	7	14	21	−7	15
7	IK Sirius	14	3	5	6	2	22	−20	14
8	Gefle IF	14	3	4	7	15	18	−3	13

=== Östra ===
Pos	Team	Pld	W	D	L	GF	GA	GD	Pts
1	Hammarby IF	14	9	3	2	30	15	+15	30
2	Vasalunds IF	14	9	2	3	28	16	+12	29
3	BK Forward	14	7	2	5	20	18	+2	23
4	Degerfors IF	14	5	5	4	21	16	+5	20
5	Väsby IK	14	6	0	8	17	22	−5	18
6	Spårvägens GoIF	14	5	2	7	22	19	+3	17
7	IFK Eskilstuna	14	3	3	8	15	29	−14	12
8	IF Brommapojkarna	14	2	3	9	9	27	−18	9

=== Västra ===
Pos	Team	Pld	W	D	L	GF	GA	GD	Pts
1	Västra Frölunda IF	14	10	1	3	35	15	+20	31
2	Örgryte IS	14	10	1	3	35	16	+19	31
3	BK Häcken	14	9	2	3	37	18	+19	29
4	IK Oddevold	14	6	4	4	24	16	+8	22
5	Jonsereds IF	14	6	3	5	30	25	+5	21
6	Gunnilse IS	14	3	4	7	18	22	−4	13
7	Motala AIF	14	1	4	9	12	43	−31	7
8	Mjölby AI	14	0	3	11	12	48	−36	3

=== Södra ===
Pos	Team	Pld	W	D	L	GF	GA	GD	Pts
1	Trelleborgs FF	14	10	1	3	29	12	+17	31
2	Helsingborgs IF	14	7	4	3	25	16	+9	25
3	Kalmar FF	14	6	3	5	22	19	+3	21
4	Markaryds IF	14	6	3	5	12	14	−2	21
5	IF Elfsborg	14	5	5	4	21	18	+3	20
6	Myresjö IF	14	4	5	5	16	20	−4	17
7	Landskrona BoIS	14	2	4	8	11	19	−8	10
8	Kalmar AIK	14	3	1	10	9	27	−18	10

== Autumn ==
=== Kvalsvenskan ===
Pos	Team	Pld	W	D	L	GF	GA	GD	Pts
1	Östers IF	14	8	6	0	36	17	+19	30
2	Trelleborgs FF	14	8	5	1	24	16	+8	29
3	GAIS	14	8	2	4	25	16	+9	26
4	Västra Frölunda IF	14	5	3	6	27	24	+3	18
5	Hammarby IF	14	4	4	6	21	21	0	16
6	Halmstads BK	14	3	4	7	28	30	−2	13
7	GIF Sundsvall	14	3	4	7	24	33	−9	13
8	Kiruna FF	14	3	0	11	12	40	−28	9

=== Norra ===
Pos	Team	Pld	W	D	L	GF	GA	GD	Pts
1	Vasalunds IF	14	9	4	1	34	18	+16	31
2	Spårvägens GoIF	14	7	5	2	35	14	+21	26
3	IFK Luleå	14	7	3	4	21	15	+6	24
4	IFK Sundsvall	14	5	2	7	27	24	+3	17
5	Väsby IK	14	5	2	7	22	22	0	17
6	Spånga IS	14	5	2	7	13	25	−12	17
7	Umeå FC	14	3	6	5	22	31	−9	15
8	Sandvikens IF	14	2	2	10	15	40	−25	8

=== Östra ===
Pos	Team	Pld	W	D	L	GF	GA	GD	Pts
1	IK Brage	14	8	3	3	29	16	+13	27
2	BK Forward	14	7	4	3	21	17	+4	25
3	IFK Eskilstuna	14	5	6	3	25	21	+4	21
4	Enköpings SK	14	5	5	4	22	24	−2	20
5	IK Sirius	14	2	9	3	17	15	+2	15
6	Motala AIF	14	4	3	7	25	27	−2	15
7	IK Sleipner	14	4	3	7	17	19	−2	15
8	Västerås SK	14	3	3	8	14	31	−17	12

=== Västra ===
Pos	Team	Pld	W	D	L	GF	GA	GD	Pts
1	BK Häcken	14	7	3	4	28	18	+10	24
2	IF Elfsborg	14	7	3	4	22	19	+3	24
3	IK Oddevold	14	6	3	5	21	17	+4	21
4	Skövde AIK	14	6	3	5	19	20	−1	21
5	Degerfors IF	14	6	2	6	18	22	−4	20
6	Gunnilse IS	14	4	4	6	18	20	−2	16
7	Jonsereds IF	14	4	4	6	22	29	−7	16
8	Örgryte IS	14	4	2	8	15	18	−3	14

=== Södra ===
Pos	Team	Pld	W	D	L	GF	GA	GD	Pts
1	Helsingborgs IF	14	10	3	1	37	10	+27	33
2	Kalmar FF	14	9	4	1	29	12	+17	31
3	Myresjö IF	14	6	4	4	23	23	0	22
4	Karlskrona AIF	14	6	3	5	23	18	+5	21
5	Mjällby AIF	14	5	4	5	21	19	+2	19
6	Landskrona BoIS	14	3	4	7	17	29	−12	13
7	Markaryds IF	14	2	3	9	12	34	−22	9
8	Falkenbergs FF	14	2	1	11	12	29	−17	7
