= 1992 Division 1 (Swedish football) =

Swedish League Division 1
- Season: 1992
- Champions: IFK Sundsvall; IK Brage; BK Häcken; Halmstads BK
- Premiers: Halmstads BK
- Promoted: Halmstads BK; IK Brage; BK Häcken; Degerfors IF; Örgryte IS; Helsingborgs IF
- Relegated: Kiruna FF; IFK Eskilstuna; Tidaholms GIF; Karlskrona AIF; Enköpings SK; Väsby IK; IF Leikin; Motala AIF
- Cup Winners' Cup: Degerfors IF

Statistics of Swedish football Division 1 in season 1992.

== Spring ==
=== Norra ===
Pos	Team	Pld	W	D	L	GF	GA	GD	Pts
1	IFK Sundsvall	14	8	3	3	17	8	+9	27
2	IFK Luleå	14	8	3	3	20	14	+6	27
3	Hammarby IF	14	7	4	3	26	18	+8	25
4	Mälarvik/Spårvägens FF	14	6	4	4	29	15	+14	22
5	GIF Sundsvall	14	7	0	7	25	17	+8	21
6	Spånga IS	14	4	4	6	13	21	−8	16
7	Kiruna FF	14	5	1	8	16	26	−10	16
8	Väsby IK	14	1	1	12	5	30	−25	4

=== Östra ===
Pos	Team	Pld	W	D	L	GF	GA	GD	Pts	Qualification
1	IK Brage	14	10	1	3	22	13	+9	31	
2	Vasalunds IF	14	8	3	3	28	17	+11	27	
3	Gefle IF	14	7	3	4	16	13	+3	24	
4	Degerfors IF	14	6	3	5	20	17	+3	21	Qualification for Cup Winners' Cup qualifying round
5	IFK Eskilstuna	14	6	2	6	17	13	+4	20	
6	IK Sirius	14	4	2	8	19	27	−8	14	
7	BK Forward	14	3	3	8	15	20	−5	12	
8	Enköpings SK	14	3	1	10	12	29	−17	10	

=== Västra ===
Pos	Team	Pld	W	D	L	GF	GA	GD	Pts
1	BK Häcken	14	9	5	0	32	10	+22	32
2	Gunnilse IS	14	8	3	3	34	19	+15	27
3	IF Elfsborg	14	7	3	4	31	25	+6	24
4	IK Oddevold	14	6	3	5	25	32	−7	21
5	Tidaholms GIF	14	4	5	5	16	21	−5	17
6	Myresjö IF	14	4	4	6	19	21	−2	16
7	Skövde AIK	14	2	3	9	13	23	−10	9
8	Motala AIF	14	1	4	9	19	38	−19	7

=== Södra ===
Pos	Team	Pld	W	D	L	GF	GA	GD	Pts
1	Halmstads BK	14	10	3	1	34	9	+25	33
2	Helsingborgs IF	14	10	1	3	38	12	+26	31
3	Landskrona BoIS	14	8	0	6	25	20	+5	24
4	Karlskrona AIF	14	6	3	5	24	23	+1	21
5	Kalmar FF	14	6	3	5	23	24	−1	21
6	IFK Hässleholm	14	4	2	8	23	37	−14	14
7	Mjällby AIF	14	3	3	8	16	29	−13	12
8	IF Leikin	14	1	1	12	12	41	−29	4

== Autumn ==
=== Kvalsvenskan ===
Pos	Team	Pld	W	D	L	GF	GA	GD	Pts
1	Halmstads BK	14	9	1	4	31	20	+11	28
2	Örebro SK	14	8	2	4	28	16	+12	26
3	IK Brage	14	7	5	2	21	11	+10	26
4	BK Häcken	14	7	2	5	29	24	+5	23
5	Djurgårdens IF	14	5	7	2	30	16	+14	22
6	GAIS	14	5	2	7	18	21	−3	17
7	Västra Frölunda IF	14	1	4	9	19	31	−12	7
8	IFK Sundsvall	14	2	1	11	12	49	−37	7

=== Norra ===
Pos	Team	Pld	W	D	L	GF	GA	GD	Pts
1	IFK Luleå	14	10	1	3	33	11	+22	31
2	Vasalunds IF	14	8	1	5	23	25	−2	25
3	IK Sirius	14	7	3	4	31	23	+8	24
4	Umeå FC	14	7	0	7	28	29	−1	21
5	Gefle IF	14	4	4	6	16	19	−3	16
6	GIF Sundsvall	14	4	4	6	28	27	+1	16
7	Gimo IF	14	4	3	7	25	40	−15	15
8	Kiruna FF	14	3	2	9	28	38	−10	11

=== Östra ===
Pos	Team	Pld	W	D	L	GF	GA	GD	Pts
1	Degerfors IF	14	9	4	1	23	11	+12	31
2	Hammarby IF	14	8	2	4	35	14	+21	26
3	IF Brommapojkarna	14	5	6	3	17	13	+4	21
4	Mälarvik/Spårvägens FF	14	6	3	5	16	19	−3	21
5	Spånga IS	14	5	3	6	14	20	−6	18
6	BK Forward	14	4	5	5	16	19	−3	17
7	IFK Eskilstuna	14	3	5	6	18	21	−3	14
8	Hertzöga BK	14	2	0	12	12	34	−22	6

=== Västra ===
Pos	Team	Pld	W	D	L	GF	GA	GD	Pts
1	Örgryte IS	14	8	4	2	33	15	+18	28
2	IK Oddevold	14	8	3	3	27	21	+6	27
3	IF Elfsborg	14	7	3	4	35	20	+15	24
4	Gunnilse IS	14	7	3	4	25	18	+7	24
5	Jonsereds IF	14	6	3	5	25	22	+3	21
6	Skövde AIK	14	4	3	7	21	28	−7	15
7	Tidaholms GIF	14	2	4	8	15	30	−15	10
8	IK Sleipner	14	2	1	11	14	41	−27	7

=== Södra ===
Pos	Team	Pld	W	D	L	GF	GA	GD	Pts
1	Helsingborgs IF	14	11	2	1	54	18	+36	35
2	Landskrona BoIS	14	9	3	2	50	20	+30	30
3	Kalmar FF	14	7	5	2	28	15	+13	26
4	Mjällby AIF	14	5	5	4	26	18	+8	20
5	Myresjö IF	14	6	0	8	24	34	−10	18
6	IFK Hässleholm	14	4	4	6	21	36	−15	16
7	Markaryds IF	14	2	1	11	13	52	−39	7
8	Karlskrona AIF	14	1	2	11	15	38	−23	5
