= 1991 in Swedish football =

The 1991 season in Swedish football, starting January 1991 and ending December 1991:

== Events ==
The 1991 and 1992 seasons of the Swedish national leagues were played using a very unusual and complicated system involving separate leagues for spring and autumn, where teams playing at different levels during the spring could be playing in the same league during the autumn. It was even possible for a team playing in the third level (Division 2) at the start of the season to gain promotion to the first level (Allsvenskan) for the start of the next season. The footnotes linked at top of each league table and play-off round gives a full explanation of the promotion and relegation rules for the league or play-off in question.

== Honours ==
=== Official titles ===
Title	Team	Reason
Swedish Champions 1991	IFK Göteborg	Winners of Mästerskapsserien
Swedish Cup Champions 1990–91	IFK Norrköping	Winners of Svenska Cupen
Swedish Cup Champions 1991	IFK Göteborg	Winners of Svenska Cupen

=== Competitions ===
Level	Competition	Team
1st level (spring)	Allsvenskan 1991	IFK Göteborg
1st level (autumn)	Mästerskapsserien 1991	IFK Göteborg
1st 1/2 level (autumn)	Kvalsvenskan 1991	Östers IF
2nd level (spring)	Division 1 Norra 1991	Kiruna FF
2nd level (spring)	Division 1 Östra 1991	Hammarby IF
2nd level (spring)	Division 1 Västra 1991	Västra Frölunda IF
2nd level (spring)	Division 1 Södra 1991	Trelleborgs FF
2nd 1/3 level (autumn)	Höstettan Norra 1991	Vasalunds IF
2nd 1/3 level (autumn)	Höstettan Östra 1991	IK Brage
2nd 1/3 level (autumn)	Höstettan Västra 1991	BK Häcken
2nd 1/3 level (autumn)	Höstettan Södra 1991	Helsingborgs IF
2nd 2/3 level (autumn)	Kvalettan Norra 1991	Gefle IF
2nd 2/3 level (autumn)	Kvalettan Södra 1991	IFK Hässleholm
Cup	Svenska Cupen 1990–91	IFK Norrköping
Cup	Svenska Cupen 1991	IFK Göteborg

== Promotions, relegations and qualifications ==
=== Promotions ===
Promoted from	Promoted to	Team	Reason
Kvalsvenskan (Division 1 Södra) 1991	Allsvenskan 1992	Trelleborgs FF	2nd team
Kvalsvenskan (Division 1 Västra) 1991	Allsvenskan 1992	Västra Frölunda IF	Winners of qualification play-off
Höstettan Norra (Division 2) 1991	Division 1 Norra 1992	Spånga IS	6th team
Höstettan Västra (Division 2) 1991	Division 1 Västra 1992	Skövde AIK	4th team
Hösttvåan (Division 2) 1991	Division 1 Västra 1992	Tidaholms GIF	Winners of promotion play-off
Höstettan Södra (Division 2) 1991	Division 1 Södra 1992	Karlskrona AIF	4th team
Höstettan Södra (Division 2) 1991	Division 1 Södra 1992	Mjällby AIF	5th team
Kvalettan Södra (Division 2) 1991	Division 1 Södra 1992	IFK Hässleholm	Winners
Hösttvåan (Division 2) 1991	Division 1 Södra 1992	IF Leikin	Winners of promotion play-off

=== League transfers ===
Transferred from	Transferred to	Team	Reason
Division 1 Östra 1991	Division 1 Norra 1992	Hammarby IF	Geographical composition
Division 1 Östra 1991	Division 1 Norra 1992	Spårvägens GoIF	Geographical composition
Division 1 Östra 1991	Division 1 Norra 1992	Väsby IK	Geographical composition
Division 1 Norra 1991	Division 1 Östra 1992	IK Brage	Geographical composition
Division 1 Norra 1991	Division 1 Östra 1992	Enköpings SK	Geographical composition
Division 1 Norra 1991	Division 1 Östra 1992	Gefle IF	Geographical composition
Division 1 Norra 1991	Division 1 Östra 1992	IK Sirius	Geographical composition
Division 1 Södra 1991	Division 1 Västra 1992	IF Elfsborg	Geographical composition
Division 1 Södra 1991	Division 1 Västra 1992	Myresjö IF	Geographical composition

=== Relegations ===
Relegated from	Relegated to	Team	Reason
Kvalsvenskan (Allsvenskan) 1991	Division 1 Södra 1992	Halmstads BK	6th team
Kvalsvenskan (Allsvenskan) 1991	Division 1 Norra 1992	GIF Sundsvall	7th team
Höstettan Östra (Division 1 Norra) 1991	Division 2 1992	Västerås SK	8th team
Höstettan Västra (Division 1 Västra) 1991	Division 2 1992	Jonsereds IF	7th team
Höstettan Västra (Division 1 Västra) 1991	Division 2 1992	Örgryte IS	8th team
Höstettan Södra (Division 1 Södra) 1991	Division 2 1992	Markaryds IF	7th team
Kvalettan Norra (Division 1 Östra) 1991	Division 2 1992	IF Brommapojkarna	3rd team
Kvalettan Södra (Division 1 Västra) 1991	Division 2 1992	Mjölby AI	3rd team
Kvalettan Södra (Division 1 Södra) 1991	Division 2 1992	Kalmar AIK	6th team

=== International qualifications ===
Qualified for	Enters	Team	Reason
UEFA Champions League 1992–93	1st round	IFK Göteborg	Winners of Mästerskapsserien
UEFA Cup 1992–93	1st round	IFK Norrköping	2nd team in Mästerskapsserien
UEFA Cup 1992–93	1st round	Örebro SK	3rd team in Mästerskapsserien
UEFA Cup Winners' Cup 1991–92	1st round	IFK Norrköping	Winners of Svenska Cupen 1990–91
UEFA Cup Winners' Cup 1992–93	1st round	AIK	Runners-up of Svenska Cupen 1991
International Football Cup 1992	Group stage	Halmstads BK	Unknown
International Football Cup 1992	Group stage	Hammarby IF	Unknown
International Football Cup 1992	Group stage	Helsingborgs IF	Unknown
International Football Cup 1992	Group stage	BK Häcken	Unknown
International Football Cup 1992	Group stage	Kiruna FF	Unknown

== Domestic results ==
=== Spring 1991 ===
==== Allsvenskan 1991 ====

	Team	Pld	W	D	L	GF		GA	GD	Pts
1	IFK Göteborg	18	9	6	3	29	–	14	+15	33
2	Örebro SK	18	9	6	3	25	–	17	+8	33
3	Malmö FF	18	7	8	3	20	–	14	+6	29
4	AIK	18	7	6	5	21	–	15	+6	27
5	Djurgårdens IF	18	6	7	5	27	–	25	+2	25
6	IFK Norrköping	18	5	6	7	24	–	24	0	21
7	Halmstads BK	18	5	6	7	22	–	22	0	21
8	GAIS	18	5	5	8	22	–	29	-7	20
9	Östers IF	18	3	9	6	23	–	26	-3	18
10	GIF Sundsvall	18	1	7	10	15	–	42	-27	10

==== Division 1 Norra 1991 ====

	Team	Pld	W	D	L	GF		GA	GD	Pts
1	Kiruna FF	14	8	2	4	22	–	19	+3	26
2	IFK Luleå	14	8	1	5	25	–	17	+8	25
3	Västerås SK	14	7	4	3	19	–	17	+2	25
4	IK Brage	14	5	4	5	15	–	15	0	19
5	Enköpings SK	14	3	7	4	23	–	22	+1	16
6	IFK Sundsvall	14	4	3	7	14	–	21	-7	15
7	IK Sirius	14	3	5	6	18	–	22	-4	14
8	Gefle IF	14	3	4	7	15	–	18	-3	13

==== Division 1 Östra 1991 ====
	Team	Pld	W	D	L	GF		GA	GD	Pts
1	Hammarby IF	14	9	3	2	30	–	15	+15	30
2	Vasalunds IF	14	9	2	3	28	–	16	+12	29
3	BK Forward	14	7	2	5	20	–	18	+2	23
4	Degerfors IF	14	5	5	4	21	–	16	+5	20
5	Väsby IK	14	6	0	8	17	–	22	-5	18
6	Spårvägens GoIF	14	5	2	7	22	–	19	+3	17
7	IFK Eskilstuna	14	3	3	8	15	–	29	-14	12
8	IF Brommapojkarna	14	2	3	9	9	–	27	-18	9

==== Division 1 Västra 1991 ====
	Team	Pld	W	D	L	GF		GA	GD	Pts
1	Västra Frölunda IF	14	10	1	3	35	–	15	+20	31
2	Örgryte IS	14	10	1	3	35	–	16	+19	31
3	BK Häcken	14	9	2	3	37	–	18	+19	29
4	IK Oddevold	14	6	4	4	24	–	16	+8	22
5	Jonsereds IF	14	6	3	5	30	–	25	+5	21
6	Gunnilse IS	14	3	4	7	18	–	22	-4	13
7	Motala AIF	14	1	4	9	12	–	43	-31	7
8	Mjölby AI	14	0	3	11	12	–	48	-36	3

==== Division 1 Södra 1991 ====
	Team	Pld	W	D	L	GF		GA	GD	Pts
1	Trelleborgs FF	14	10	1	3	29	–	12	+17	31
2	Helsingborgs IF	14	7	4	3	25	–	16	+9	25
3	Kalmar FF	14	6	3	5	22	–	19	+3	21
4	Markaryds IF	14	6	3	5	12	–	14	-2	21
5	IF Elfsborg	14	5	5	4	21	–	18	+3	20
6	Myresjö IF	14	4	5	5	16	–	20	-4	17
7	Landskrona BoIS	14	2	4	8	11	–	19	-8	10
8	Kalmar AIK	14	3	1	10	9	–	27	-18	10

=== Autumn 1991 ===
==== Mästerskapsserien 1991 ====

	Team	Pld	W	D	L	GF		GA	GD	Pts
1	IFK Göteborg	10	6	1	3	14	–	10	+4	36
2	IFK Norrköping	10	6	2	2	18	–	10	+8	31
3	Örebro SK	10	3	2	5	7	–	13	-6	28
4	Malmö FF	10	3	3	4	9	–	11	-2	27
5	Djurgårdens IF	10	3	4	3	16	–	15	+1	26
6	AIK	10	3	0	7	10	–	15	-5	23

==== Kvalsvenskan 1991 ====
	Team	Pld	W	D	L	GF		GA	GD	Pts
1	Östers IF	14	8	6	0	36	–	17	+19	30
2	Trelleborgs FF	14	8	5	1	24	–	16	+8	29
3	GAIS	14	8	2	4	25	–	16	+9	26
4	Västra Frölunda IF	14	5	3	6	27	–	24	+3	18
5	Hammarby IF	14	4	4	6	21	–	21	0	16
6	Halmstads BK	14	3	4	7	28	–	30	-2	13
7	GIF Sundsvall	14	3	4	7	24	–	33	-9	13
8	Kiruna FF	14	3	0	11	12	–	40	-28	9

==== Allsvenskan qualification play-off 1991 ====
1st round

October 12, 1991

IK Brage	2–1	Vasalunds IF

?, Borlänge
October 20, 1991

Vasalunds IF	0–2	IK Brage

?, Solna

October 12, 1991

BK Häcken	2–2	Helsingborgs IF

?, Gothenburg
October 20, 1991

Helsingborgs IF	(ag) 1–1	BK Häcken

?, Helsingborg

2nd round

October 23, 1991

IK Brage	0–3	Helsingborgs IF

?, Borlänge
October 26, 1991

Helsingborgs IF	0–1	IK Brage

?, Helsingborg

3rd round

November 3, 1991

Helsingborgs IF	4–2	Västra Frölunda IF

?, Helsingborg
November 9, 1991

Västra Frölunda IF	(ag) 3–1	Helsingborgs IF

?, Gothenburg

==== Höstettan Norra 1991 ====

	Team	Pld	W	D	L	GF		GA	GD	Pts
1	Vasalunds IF	14	9	4	1	34	–	18	+16	31
2	Spårvägens GoIF	14	7	5	2	35	–	14	+21	26
3	IFK Luleå	14	7	3	4	21	–	15	+6	24
4	IFK Sundsvall	14	5	2	7	27	–	24	+3	17
5	Väsby IK	14	5	2	7	22	–	22	0	17
6	Spånga IS	14	5	2	7	13	–	25	-12	17
7	Umeå FC	14	3	6	5	22	–	31	-9	15
8	Sandvikens IF	14	2	2	10	15	–	40	-25	8

==== Höstettan Östra 1991 ====
	Team	Pld	W	D	L	GF		GA	GD	Pts
1	IK Brage	14	8	3	3	29	–	16	+13	27
2	BK Forward	14	7	4	3	21	–	17	+4	25
3	IFK Eskilstuna	14	5	6	3	25	–	21	+4	21
4	Enköpings SK	14	5	5	4	22	–	24	-2	20
5	IK Sirius	14	2	9	3	17	–	15	+2	15
6	Motala AIF	14	4	3	7	25	–	27	-2	15
7	IK Sleipner	14	4	3	7	17	–	19	-2	15
8	Västerås SK	14	3	3	8	14	–	31	-17	12

==== Höstettan Västra 1991 ====
	Team	Pld	W	D	L	GF		GA	GD	Pts
1	BK Häcken	14	7	3	4	28	–	18	+10	24
2	IF Elfsborg	14	7	3	4	22	–	19	+3	24
3	IK Oddevold	14	6	3	5	21	–	17	+4	21
4	Skövde AIK	14	6	3	5	19	–	20	-1	21
5	Degerfors IF	14	6	2	6	18	–	22	-4	20
6	Gunnilse IS	14	4	4	6	18	–	20	-2	16
7	Jonsereds IF	14	4	4	6	22	–	29	-7	16
8	Örgryte IS	14	4	2	8	15	–	18	-3	14

==== Höstettan Södra 1991 ====
	Team	Pld	W	D	L	GF		GA	GD	Pts
1	Helsingborgs IF	14	10	3	1	37	–	10	+27	33
2	Kalmar FF	14	9	4	1	29	–	12	+17	31
3	Myresjö IF	14	6	4	4	23	–	23	0	22
4	Karlskrona AIF	14	6	3	5	23	–	18	+5	21
5	Mjällby AIF	14	5	4	5	21	–	19	+2	19
6	Landskrona BoIS	14	3	4	7	17	–	29	-12	13
7	Markaryds IF	14	2	3	9	12	–	34	-22	9
8	Falkenbergs FF	14	2	1	11	12	–	29	-17	7

==== Division 1 promotion play-off 1991 ====
1st round

October 12, 1991

Kungsbacka BI	5–1	Hudiksvalls ABK

?, ?
October 19, 1991

Hudiksvalls ABK	1–2	Kungsbacka BI

?, ?

October 12, 1991

Hertzöga BK	3–0	IFK Uddevalla

?, ?
October 19, 1991

IFK Uddevalla	1–4	Hertzöga BK

?, ?

October 13, 1991

Gimo IF	1–0	Tidaholms GIF

?, ?
October 20, 1991

Tidaholms GIF	5–1	Gimo IF

?, ?

October 13, 1991

IF Leikin	2–0	IFK Östersund

?, ?
October 19, 1991

IFK Östersund	1–3	IF Leikin

?, ?

2nd round

October 26, 1991

Tidaholms GIF	3–1	Hertzöga BK

?, ?
November 2, 1991

Hertzöga BK	2–2	Tidaholms GIF

?, ?

October 27, 1991

IF Leikin	1–0	Kungsbacka BI

?, ?
November 2, 1991

Kungsbacka BI	0–2	IF Leikin

?, ?

==== Kvalettan Norra 1991 ====

	Team	Pld	W	D	L	GF		GA	GD	Pts
1	Gefle IF	10	6	2	2	21	–	12	+9	20
2	Hudiksvalls ABK	10	6	2	2	16	–	14	+2	20
3	IF Brommapojkarna	10	6	1	3	23	–	12	+9	19
4	KB Karlskoga	10	5	0	5	16	–	19	-3	15
5	Södertälje FF	10	3	0	7	16	–	20	-4	9
6	Skellefteå AIK	10	1	1	8	14	–	29	-15	3

==== Kvalettan Södra 1991 ====
	Team	Pld	W	D	L	GF		GA	GD	Pts
1	IFK Hässleholm	10	8	1	1	44	–	12	+32	25
2	IFK Uddevalla	10	8	0	2	31	–	21	+10	24
3	Mjölby AI	10	4	1	5	22	–	33	-11	13
4	Åsa IF	10	3	1	6	26	–	29	-3	10
5	Norrby IF	10	3	0	7	12	–	28	-16	9
6	Kalmar AIK	10	2	1	7	17	–	29	-12	7

=== Svenska Cupen 1990–91 ===
Final

June 26, 1991

IFK Norrköping	4–1	Östers IF

Råsunda, Solna

=== Svenska Cupen 1991 ===
Final

November 2, 1991

IFK Göteborg	2–2 3–2 (agg)	AIK

Råsunda, Solna
