= 1992 in Swedish football =

The 1992 season in Swedish football, starting January 1992 and ending December 1992:

== Events ==
The 1991 and 1992 seasons of the Swedish national leagues were played using a very unusual and complicated system involving separate leagues for spring and autumn, where teams playing at different levels during the spring could be playing in the same league during the autumn. It was even possible for a team playing in the third level (Division 2) at the start of the season to gain promotion to the first level (Allsvenskan) for the start of the next season. The footnotes linked at top of each league table and play-off round gives a full explanation of the promotion and relegation rules for the league or play-off in question.

== Honours ==
=== Official titles ===
Title	Team	Reason
Swedish Champions 1992	AIK	Winners of Mästerskapsserien

=== Competitions ===
Level	Competition	Team
1st level (spring)	Allsvenskan 1992	IFK Norrköping
1st level (autumn)	Mästerskapsserien 1992	AIK
1st 1/2 level (autumn)	Kvalsvenskan 1992	Halmstads BK
2nd level (spring)	Division 1 Norra 1992	IFK Sundsvall
2nd level (spring)	Division 1 Östra 1992	IK Brage
2nd level (spring)	Division 1 Västra 1992	BK Häcken
2nd level (spring)	Division 1 Södra 1992	Halmstads BK
2nd 1/3 level (autumn)	Höstettan Norra 1992	IFK Luleå
2nd 1/3 level (autumn)	Höstettan Östra 1992	Degerfors IF
2nd 1/3 level (autumn)	Höstettan Västra 1992	Örgryte IS
2nd 1/3 level (autumn)	Höstettan Södra 1992	Helsingborgs IF
2nd 2/3 level (autumn)	Kvalettan Norra 1992	Assyriska Föreningen
2nd 2/3 level (autumn)	Kvalettan Södra 1992	Lunds BK

== Promotions, relegations and qualifications ==
=== Promotions ===
Promoted from	Promoted to	Team	Reason
Kvalsvenskan (Division 1 Södra) 1992	Allsvenskan 1993	Halmstads BK	Winners
Kvalsvenskan (Division 1 Östra) 1992	Allsvenskan 1993	IK Brage	3rd team
Kvalsvenskan (Division 1 Västra) 1992	Allsvenskan 1993	BK Häcken	4th team
Höstettan Östra (Division 1 Östra) 1992	Allsvenskan 1993	Degerfors IF	Winners of qualification play-off
Höstettan Västra (Division 2) 1992	Allsvenskan 1993	Örgryte IS	Winners of qualification play-off
Höstettan Södra (Division 1 Södra) 1992	Allsvenskan 1993	Helsingborgs IF	Winners of qualification play-off
Höstettan Norra (Division 2) 1992	Division 1 Norra 1993	Umeå FC	4th team
Höstettan Östra (Division 2) 1992	Division 1 Norra 1993	IF Brommapojkarna	3rd team
Kvalettan Norra (Division 2) 1992	Division 1 Norra 1993	Assyriska Föreningen	Winners
Hösttvåan (Division 2) 1992	Division 1 Norra 1993	Ope IF	Winners of promotion play-off
Höstettan Västra (Division 2) 1992	Division 1 Södra 1993	Jonsereds IF	5th team
Kvalettan Södra (Division 2) 1992	Division 1 Södra 1993	Lunds BK	Winners
Kvalettan Södra (Division 2) 1992	Division 1 Södra 1993	IFK Uddevalla	Winners of promotion play-off

=== League transfers ===
Transferred from	Transferred to	Team	Reason
Division 1 Östra 1992	Division 1 Norra 1993	Gefle IF	Geographical composition
Division 1 Östra 1992	Division 1 Norra 1993	IK Sirius	Geographical composition
Division 1 Östra 1992	Division 1 Norra 1993	Vasalunds IF	Geographical composition
Division 1 Östra 1992	Division 1 Södra 1993	BK Forward	Geographical composition
Division 1 Västra 1992	Division 1 Södra 1993	IF Elfsborg	Geographical composition
Division 1 Västra 1992	Division 1 Södra 1993	Gunnilse IS	Geographical composition
Division 1 Västra 1992	Division 1 Södra 1993	Myresjö IF	Geographical composition
Division 1 Västra 1992	Division 1 Södra 1993	IK Oddevold	Geographical composition
Division 1 Västra 1992	Division 1 Södra 1993	Skövde AIK	Geographical composition

=== Relegations ===
Relegated from	Relegated to	Team	Reason
Kvalsvenskan (Allsvenskan) 1992	Division 1 Norra 1993	Djurgårdens IF	Losers of qualification play-off
Kvalsvenskan (Allsvenskan) 1992	Division 1 Södra 1993	GAIS	Losers of qualification play-off
Höstettan Norra (Division 1 Norra) 1992	Division 2 1993	Kiruna FF	8th team
Höstettan Östra (Division 1 Östra) 1992	Division 2 1993	IFK Eskilstuna	7th team
Höstettan Västra (Division 1 Västra) 1992	Division 2 1993	Tidaholms GIF	7th team
Höstettan Södra (Division 1 Södra) 1992	Division 2 1993	Karlskrona AIF	8th team
Kvalettan Norra (Division 1 Östra) 1992	Division 2 1993	Enköpings SK	Losers of promotion play-off
Kvalettan Norra (Division 1 Norra) 1992	Division 2 1993	Väsby IK	4th team
Kvalettan Södra (Division 1 Södra) 1992	Division 2 1993	IF Leikin	3rd team
Kvalettan Södra (Division 1 Västra) 1992	Division 2 1993	Motala AIF	4th team

=== International qualifications ===
Qualified for	Enters	Team	Reason
UEFA Champions League 1993–94	1st round	AIK	Winners of Mästerskapsserien
UEFA Cup 1993–94	1st round	IFK Norrköping	2nd team in Mästerskapsserien
UEFA Cup 1993–94	1st round	Östers IF	3rd team in Mästerskapsserien
International Football Cup 1993	Group stage	Halmstads BK	Unknown
International Football Cup 1993	Group stage	BK Häcken	Unknown
International Football Cup 1993	Group stage	Malmö FF	Unknown
International Football Cup 1993	Group stage	IFK Norrköping	Unknown
International Football Cup 1993	Group stage	Trelleborgs FF	Unknown

== Domestic results ==
=== Spring 1992 ===
==== Allsvenskan 1992 ====
	Team	Pld	W	D	L	GF		GA	GD	Pts
1	IFK Norrköping	18	11	3	4	38	–	19	+19	36
2	Östers IF	18	8	5	5	36	–	29	+7	29
3	Trelleborgs FF	18	7	7	4	20	–	20	0	28
4	AIK	18	7	6	5	24	–	18	+6	27
5	Malmö FF	18	7	5	6	22	–	16	+6	26
6	IFK Göteborg	18	7	2	9	25	–	24	+1	23
7	Djurgårdens IF	18	6	5	7	26	–	32	-6	23
8	Örebro SK	18	4	8	6	17	–	23	-6	20
9	Västra Frölunda IF	18	4	5	9	18	–	27	-9	17
10	GAIS	18	4	4	10	14	–	32	-18	16

==== Division 1 Norra 1992 ====
	Team	Pld	W	D	L	GF		GA	GD	Pts
1	IFK Sundsvall	14	8	3	3	17	–	8	+9	27
2	IFK Luleå	14	8	3	3	20	–	14	+6	27
3	Hammarby IF	14	7	4	3	26	–	18	+8	25
4	Mälarvik/Spårvägens FF	14	6	4	4	29	–	15	+14	22
5	GIF Sundsvall	14	7	0	7	25	–	17	+8	21
6	Spånga IS	14	4	4	6	13	–	21	-8	16
7	Kiruna FF	14	5	1	8	16	–	26	-10	16
8	Väsby IK	14	1	1	12	5	–	30	-25	4

==== Division 1 Östra 1992 ====
	Team	Pld	W	D	L	GF		GA	GD	Pts
1	IK Brage	14	10	1	3	22	–	13	+9	31
2	Vasalunds IF	14	8	3	3	28	–	17	+11	7
3	Gefle IF	14	7	3	4	16	–	13	+3	24
4	Degerfors IF	14	6	3	5	20	–	17	+3	21
5	IFK Eskilstuna	14	6	2	6	17	–	13	+4	20
6	IK Sirius	14	4	2	8	19	–	27	-8	14
7	BK Forward	14	3	3	8	15	–	20	-5	12
8	Enköpings SK	14	3	1	10	12	–	29	-17	10

==== Division 1 Västra 1992 ====
	Team	Pld	W	D	L	GF		GA	GD	Pts
1	BK Häcken	14	9	5	0	32	–	10	+22	32
2	Gunnilse IS	14	8	3	3	34	–	19	+15	27
3	IF Elfsborg	14	7	3	4	31	–	25	+6	24
4	IK Oddevold	14	6	3	5	25	–	32	-7	21
5	Tidaholms GIF	14	4	5	5	16	–	21	-5	17
6	Myresjö IF	14	4	4	6	19	–	21	-2	16
7	Skövde AIK	14	2	3	9	13	–	23	-10	9
8	Motala AIF	14	1	4	9	19	–	38	-19	7

==== Division 1 Södra 1992 ====
	Team	Pld	W	D	L	GF		GA	GD	Pts
1	Halmstads BK	14	10	3	1	34	–	9	+25	33
2	Helsingborgs IF	14	10	1	3	38	–	12	+26	31
3	Landskrona BoIS	14	8	0	6	25	–	20	+5	24
4	Karlskrona AIF	14	6	3	5	24	–	23	+1	21
5	Kalmar FF	14	6	3	5	23	–	24	-1	21
6	IFK Hässleholm	14	4	2	8	23	–	37	-14	14
7	Mjällby AIF	14	3	3	8	16	–	29	-13	12
8	IF Leikin	14	1	1	12	12	–	41	-29	4

=== Autumn 1992 ===
==== Mästerskapsserien 1992 ====
	Team	Pld	W	D	L	GF		GA	GD	Pts
1	AIK	10	6	2	2	23	–	11	+12	34
2	IFK Norrköping	10	4	2	4	14	–	18	-4	32
3	Östers IF	10	4	3	3	18	–	17	+1	30
4	Trelleborgs FF	10	4	0	6	23	–	29	-6	26
5	IFK Göteborg	10	4	1	5	17	–	17	0	25
6	Malmö FF	10	3	2	5	11	–	14	-3	24

==== Kvalsvenskan 1992 ====
	Team	Pld	W	D	L	GF		GA	GD	Pts
1	Halmstads BK	14	9	1	4	31	–	20	+11	28
2	Örebro SK	14	8	2	4	28	–	16	+12	26
3	IK Brage	14	7	5	2	21	–	11	+10	26
4	BK Häcken	14	7	2	5	29	–	24	+5	23
5	Djurgårdens IF	14	5	7	2	30	–	16	+14	22
6	GAIS	14	5	2	7	18	–	21	-3	17
7	Västra Frölunda IF	14	1	4	9	19	–	31	-12	7
8	IFK Sundsvall	14	2	1	11	12	–	49	-37	7

==== Allsvenskan qualification play-off 1992 ====
1st round

	Team	Pld	W	D	L	GF		GA	GD	Pts
1	Helsingborgs IF	3	1	2	0	7	–	6	+1	5
2	IFK Luleå	3	1	1	1	5	–	5	0	4
3	Örgryte IS	3	0	3	0	1	–	1	0	3
4	Degerfors IF	3	0	2	1	3	–	4	-1	2

2nd round

November 1, 1992

Djurgårdens IF	3–1	Degerfors IF

Stockholms stadion, Stockholm
November 7, 1992

Degerfors IF	(ag) 2–0	Djurgårdens IF

Stora Valla, Degerfors

October 31, 1992

GAIS	1–2	Örgryte IS

?, Gothenburg
November 7, 1992

Örgryte IS	2–0	GAIS

?, Gothenburg

October 31, 1992

IFK Luleå	2–1	Västra Frölunda IF

?, Luleå
November 7, 1992

Västra Frölunda IF	4–2	IFK Luleå

?, Gothenburg

October 31, 1992

Helsingborgs IF	3–0	IFK Sundsvall

?, Helsingborg
November 7, 1992

IFK Sundsvall	1–6	Helsingborgs IF

?, Sundsvall

==== Höstettan Norra 1992 ====
	Team	Pld	W	D	L	GF		GA	GD	Pts
1	IFK Luleå	14	10	1	3	33	–	11	+22	31
2	Vasalunds IF	14	8	1	5	23	–	25	-2	25
3	IK Sirius	14	7	3	4	31	–	23	+8	24
4	Umeå FC	14	7	0	7	28	–	29	-1	21
5	Gefle IF	14	4	4	6	16	–	19	-3	16
6	GIF Sundsvall	14	4	4	6	28	–	27	+1	16
7	Gimo IF	14	4	3	7	25	–	40	-15	15
8	Kiruna FF	14	3	2	9	28	–	38	-10	11

==== Höstettan Östra 1992 ====
	Team	Pld	W	D	L	GF		GA	GD	Pts
1	Degerfors IF	14	9	4	1	23	–	11	+12	31
2	Hammarby IF	14	8	2	4	35	–	14	+21	26
3	IF Brommapojkarna	14	5	6	3	17	–	13	+4	21
4	Mälarvik/Spårvägens FF	14	6	3	5	16	–	19	-3	21
5	Spånga IS	14	5	3	6	14	–	20	-6	18
6	BK Forward	14	4	5	5	16	–	19	-3	17
7	IFK Eskilstuna	14	3	5	6	18	–	21	-3	14
8	Hertzöga BK	14	2	0	12	12	–	34	-22	6

==== Höstettan Västra 1992 ====
	Team	Pld	W	D	L	GF		GA	GD	Pts
1	Örgryte IS	14	8	4	2	33	–	15	+18	28
2	IK Oddevold	14	8	3	3	27	–	21	+6	27
3	IF Elfsborg	14	7	3	4	35	–	20	+15	24
4	Gunnilse IS	14	7	3	4	25	–	18	+7	24
5	Jonsereds IF	14	6	3	5	25	–	22	+3	21
6	Skövde AIK	14	4	3	7	21	–	28	-7	15
7	Tidaholms GIF	14	2	4	8	15	–	30	-15	10
8	IK Sleipner	14	2	1	11	14	–	41	-27	7

==== Höstettan Södra 1992 ====
	Team	Pld	W	D	L	GF		GA	GD	Pts
1	Helsingborgs IF	14	11	2	1	54	–	18	+36	35
2	Landskrona BoIS	14	9	3	2	50	–	20	+30	30
3	Kalmar FF	14	7	5	2	28	–	15	+13	26
4	Mjällby AIF	14	5	5	4	26	–	18	+8	20
5	Myresjö IF	14	6	0	8	24	–	34	-10	18
6	IFK Hässleholm	14	4	4	6	21	–	36	-15	16
7	Markaryds IF	14	2	1	11	13	–	52	-39	7
8	Karlskrona AIF	14	1	2	11	15	–	38	-23	5

==== Division 1 promotion play-off 1992 ====
1st round

October 10, 1992

Karlslunds IF	0–2	Melleruds IF

?, ?
October 17, 1992

Melleruds IF	3–1	Karlslunds IF

?, ?

October 11, 1992

IFK Trelleborg	0–1	Skiljebo SK

?, ?
October 18, 1992

Skiljebo SK	2–2	IFK Trelleborg

?, ?

October 10, 1992

IFK Värnamo	1–0	Ope IF

?, ?
October 18, 1992

Ope IF	2–0	IFK Värnamo

?, ?

October 10, 1992

IFK Uddevalla	2–0	Enköpings SK

?, ?
October 18, 1992

Enköpings SK	3–2	IFK Uddevalla

?, ?

2nd round

October 24, 1992

Melleruds IF	1–2	IFK Uddevalla

?, ?
October 31, 1992

IFK Uddevalla	3–1	Melleruds IF

?, ?

October 24, 1992

Ope IF	1–0	Skiljebo SK

?, ?
October 31, 1992

Skiljebo SK	1–1	Ope IF

?, ?

==== Kvalettan Norra 1992 ====
	Team	Pld	W	D	L	GF		GA	GD	Pts
1	Assyriska Föreningen	10	8	0	2	22	–	7	+15	24
2	Enköpings SK	10	6	0	4	9	–	11	-2	18
3	Västerås SK	10	5	2	3	16	–	8	+8	17
4	Väsby IK	10	5	2	3	16	–	12	+4	17
5	IFK Östersund	10	2	1	7	6	–	16	-10	7
6	Skellefteå AIK	10	1	1	8	1	–	16	-15	4

==== Kvalettan Södra 1992 ====
	Team	Pld	W	D	L	GF		GA	GD	Pts
1	Lunds BK	10	6	3	1	15	–	5	+10	21
2	IFK Uddevalla	10	5	2	3	22	–	15	+7	17
3	IF Leikin	10	5	1	4	20	–	20	0	16
4	Motala AIF	10	3	2	5	13	–	15	-2	11
5	Norrby IF	10	3	1	6	15	–	22	-7	10
6	Nybro IF	10	3	1	6	10	–	18	-8	10
