= 1988 in Swedish football =

The 1988 season in Swedish football, starting January 1988 and ending December 1988.

== Honours ==
=== Official titles ===
Title	Team	Reason
Swedish Champions 1988	Malmö FF	Winners of Allsvenskan play-off
Swedish Cup Champions 1987–88	IFK Norrköping	Winners of Svenska Cupen

=== Competitions ===
Level	Competition	Team
1st level	Allsvenskan 1988	Malmö FF
1st level	Allsvenskan play-off 1988	Malmö FF
2nd level	Division 1 Norra 1988	Örebro SK
2nd level	Division 1 Södra 1988	Halmstads BK
Cup	Svenska Cupen 1987–88	IFK Norrköping

== Promotions, relegations and qualifications ==
=== Promotions ===
Promoted from	Promoted to	Team	Reason
Division 1 Norra 1988	Allsvenskan 1989	Örebro SK	Winners
Division 1 Södra 1988	Allsvenskan 1989	Halmstads BK	Winners
Division 2 1988	Division 1 Norra 1989	Kiruna FF	Winners of Norra
Division 2 1988	Division 1 Norra 1989	Motala AIF	Winners of Mellersta
Division 2 1988	Division 1 Södra 1989	Jonsereds IF	Winners of Västra
Division 2 1988	Division 1 Södra 1989	Kalmar FF	Winners of Södra

=== Relegations ===
Relegated from	Relegated to	Team	Reason
Allsvenskan 1988	Division 1 Södra 1989	Östers IF	11th team
Allsvenskan 1988	Division 1 Norra 1989	Hammarby IF	12th team
Division 1 Norra 1988	Division 2 1989	Skellefteå AIK	13th team
Division 1 Norra 1988	Division 2 1989	IFK Mora	14th team
Division 1 Södra 1988	Division 2 1989	Myresjö IF	13th team
Division 1 Södra 1988	Division 2 1989	IFK Hässleholm	14th team

=== International qualifications ===
Qualified for	Enters	Team	Reason
European Cup 1989–90	1st round	Malmö FF	Winners of Allsvenskan play-off
UEFA Cup 1989–90	1st round	IFK Göteborg	2nd team in Allsvenskan
UEFA Cup 1989–90	1st round	Örgryte IS	4th team in Allsvenskan
UEFA Cup Winners' Cup 1988–89	1st round	IFK Norrköping	Winners of Svenska Cupen
International Football Cup 1989	Group stage	Malmö FF	Winners of Allsvenskan
International Football Cup 1989	Group stage	IFK Göteborg	2nd team in Allsvenskan
International Football Cup 1989	Group stage	Djurgårdens IF	3rd team in Allsvenskan
International Football Cup 1989	Group stage	Örgryte IS	4th team in Allsvenskan
International Football Cup 1989	Group stage	Örebro SK	Unknown

== Domestic results ==
=== Allsvenskan 1988 ===
	Team	Pld	W	D	L	GF		GA	GD	Pts
1	Malmö FF	22	15	2	5	45	–	26	+19	32
2	IFK Göteborg	22	13	5	4	37	–	18	+19	31
3	Djurgårdens IF	22	9	9	4	38	–	22	+16	27
4	Örgryte IS	22	9	5	8	27	–	23	+4	23
5	GIF Sundsvall	22	8	7	7	26	–	26	0	23
6	IFK Norrköping	22	9	3	10	39	–	29	+10	21
7	IK Brage	22	7	7	8	23	–	30	-7	21
8	GAIS	22	8	4	10	25	–	31	-6	20
9	Västra Frölunda IF	22	6	6	10	24	–	34	-10	18
10	AIK	22	6	6	10	19	–	30	-11	18
11	Östers IF	22	4	9	9	20	–	33	-13	17
12	Hammarby IF	22	5	3	14	19	–	40	-21	13

=== Allsvenskan play-off 1988 ===
Semi-finals

October 30, 1988

Örgryte IS	0–1	Malmö FF

?, ?
November 12, 1988

Malmö FF	2–1	Örgryte IS

?, ?

October 30, 1988

Djurgårdens IF	2–0	IFK Göteborg

?, ?
November 12, 1988

IFK Göteborg	1–0	Djurgårdens IF

?, ?

Final

November 16, 1988

Djurgårdens IF	0–0	Malmö FF

Stockholms Stadion, Stockholm
November 19, 1988

Malmö FF	7–3	Djurgårdens IF

Malmö Stadion, Malmö

=== Division 1 Norra 1988 ===
	Team	Pld	W	D	L	GF		GA	GD	Pts
1	Örebro SK	26	15	9	2	37	–	9	+28	39
2	IFK Eskilstuna	26	13	8	5	57	–	28	+29	34
3	Vasalunds IF	26	13	8	5	47	–	28	+19	34
4	Gefle IF	26	11	11	4	44	–	25	+19	33
5	Åtvidabergs FF	26	9	11	6	35	–	29	+6	29
6	IF Brommapojkarna	26	10	8	8	29	–	31	-2	28
7	Västerås SK	26	11	5	10	46	–	36	+10	27
8	IFK Holmsund	26	9	9	8	27	–	32	-5	27
9	BK Forward	26	5	13	8	28	–	30	-2	23
10	Luleå FF/IFK	26	6	10	10	19	–	27	-8	22
11	Karlstads BK	26	6	8	12	33	–	44	-11	20
12	Väsby IK	26	4	11	11	24	–	39	-15	19
13	Skellefteå AIK	26	4	8	14	25	–	57	-32	16
14	IFK Mora	26	2	9	15	17	–	53	-36	13

=== Division 1 Södra 1988 ===
	Team	Pld	W	D	L	GF		GA	GD	Pts
1	Halmstads BK	26	16	6	4	50	–	20	+30	38
2	Mjällby AIF	26	16	6	4	39	–	21	+18	38
3	Kalmar AIK	26	15	5	6	50	–	39	+11	35
4	IK Oddevold	26	9	10	7	47	–	27	+20	28
5	BK Häcken	26	12	4	10	49	–	37	+12	28
6	Landskrona BoIS	26	9	10	7	31	–	27	+4	28
7	Karlskrona AIF	26	10	7	9	34	–	38	-4	27
8	Markaryds IF	26	10	5	11	34	–	38	-4	25
9	Trelleborgs FF	26	9	6	11	45	–	46	-1	24
10	IF Elfsborg	26	7	9	10	34	–	35	-1	23
11	Ifö/Bromölla IF	26	6	8	12	28	–	41	-13	20
12	Falkenbergs FF	26	7	6	13	36	–	56	-20	20
13	Myresjö IF	26	7	5	14	31	–	48	-17	19
14	IFK Hässleholm	26	3	5	18	28	–	63	-35	11

=== Svenska Cupen 1987–88 ===
Final

June 29, 1988

IFK Norrköping	3–1	Örebro SK

Råsunda, Solna

== National team results ==
January 12, 1988
Maspalomas semi-finals
№ 639

Sweden	4–1	East Germany
Truedsson 12'; Thern 54', 76'; Rehn 58'		Thom 41'

Estadio Municipal San Fernando de Maspalomas, Maspalomas
Attendance: 4,500
Referee: Sosa Saavedra (Spain)

January 15, 1988
Maspalomas final
№ 640

Sweden	1–0	Finland
Thern 31'

Estadio Municipal San Fernando de Maspalomas, Maspalomas
Attendance: 4,129
Referee: Jiménez Moreno (Spain)

March 31, 1988
West Berlin Tourn.
semi-finals
№ 641

West Germany	1–1 (aet) 2–4 (pso)	Sweden
Allofs 42'		Truedsson 74'
Penalties
Thon (penalty scored); Eckstein (penalty scored); Matthäus (penalty missed); Völler (penalty missed)	2–4	Prytz (penalty scored); Larsson (penalty scored); Strömberg (penalty scored); Thern (penalty scored)

Olympiastadion, West Berlin
Attendance: 23,709
Referee: Hartmann (Hungary)

April 2, 1988
West Berlin Tourn.
final
№ 642

Sweden	2–0	Soviet Union
Eskilsson 52'; Holmqvist 88'

Olympiastadion, West Berlin
Attendance: 26,000
Referee: van Langenhove (Belgium)

April 27, 1988
Friendly
№ 643

Sweden	4–1	Wales
Holmqvist 16', 55'; Strömberg 24'; Eskilsson 67'		Hodges 26'

Råsunda, Solna
Attendance: 11,656
Referee: Losert (Austria)

June 1, 1988
Friendly
№ 644

Spain	1–3	Sweden
Butragueño 14'		Nilsson 22'; Hysén 43'; Magnusson 48'

Estadio El Helmántico, Villares de la Reina
Attendance: 25,000
Referee: Worrall (England)

August 31, 1988
Friendly
№ 645

Sweden	1–2	Denmark
Pettersson 81'		Elstrup 29', 63'

Råsunda, Solna
Attendance: 20,528
Referee: Palsi (Finland)

October 12, 1988
Friendly
№ 646

Sweden	0–0	Portugal

Ullevi, Gothenburg
Attendance: 10,092
Referee: Nervik (Norway)

October 19, 1988
1990 World Cup qualification
№ 647

England	0–0	Sweden

Wembley, London
Attendance: 65,628
Referee: Biguet (France)

November 5, 1988
1990 World Cup qualification
№ 648

Albania	1–2	Sweden
Shehu 33'		Holmqvist 67'; Ekström 72'

Stadiumin Kombėtar Qemal Stafa, Tirana
Attendance: 20,000
Referee: Namoglu (Turkey)
