= 1990 Division 1 (Swedish football) =

Swedish League Division 1
- Season: 1990
- Champions: GIF Sundsvall; BK Häcken
- Promoted: GIF Sundsvall
- Relegated: IFK Holmsund; Tyresö FF; Mjällby AIF; Karlskrona AIF

Statistics of Swedish football Division 1 in season 1990.

== Overview ==
It was contested by 28 teams, and GIF Sundsvall and BK Häcken won the championship.

== League standings ==
=== Norra ===
Pos	Team	Pld	W	D	L	GF	GA	GD	Pts
1	GIF Sundsvall	26	19	4	3	69	27	+42	61
2	Vasalunds IF	26	15	4	7	45	21	+24	49
3	IF Brommapojkarna	26	15	4	7	46	29	+17	49
4	Spårvägens GoIF	26	13	6	7	55	37	+18	45
5	Västerås SK	26	12	5	9	46	31	+15	41
6	Kiruna FF	26	11	5	10	50	39	+11	38
7	IFK Luleå	26	10	8	8	37	28	+9	38
8	Gefle IF	26	12	2	12	35	38	−3	38
9	BK Forward	26	8	11	7	33	29	+4	35
10	Motala AIF	26	9	7	10	41	44	−3	34
11	Väsby IK	26	9	5	12	33	44	−11	32
12	IFK Eskilstuna	26	7	7	12	34	45	−11	28
13	IFK Holmsund	26	2	6	18	16	68	−52	12
14	Tyresö FF	26	1	4	21	18	78	−60	7

=== Södra ===
Pos	Team	Pld	W	D	L	GF	GA	GD	Pts
1	BK Häcken	26	14	9	3	53	23	+30	51
2	Helsingborgs IF	26	14	8	4	37	19	+18	50
3	Västra Frölunda IF	26	15	4	7	38	27	+11	49
4	Trelleborgs FF	26	13	3	10	41	33	+8	42
5	Jonsereds IF	26	10	8	8	38	30	+8	38
6	Kalmar AIK	26	10	6	10	35	41	−6	36
7	IK Oddevold	26	9	6	11	33	34	−1	33
8	Kalmar FF	26	9	5	12	32	34	−2	32
9	Markaryds IF	26	8	7	11	30	43	−13	31
10	IF Elfsborg	26	7	9	10	30	35	−5	30
11	Gunnilse IS	26	7	8	11	31	34	−3	29
12	Landskrona BoIS	26	7	8	11	30	39	−9	29
13	Mjällby AIF	26	7	7	12	27	37	−10	28
14	Karlskrona AIF	26	5	6	15	22	48	−26	21
