= 1988 Division 1 (Swedish football) =

Swedish League Division 1
- Season: 1988
- Champions: Örebro SK; Halmstads BK
- Promoted: Örebro SK; Halmstads BK
- Relegated: Skellefteå AIK; IFK Mora; Myresjö IF; IFK Hässleholm

Statistics of Swedish football Division 1 in season 1988.

== Overview ==
It was contested by 28 teams, and Örebro SK and Halmstads BK won the championship.

== League standings ==
=== Norra ===
Pos	Team	Pld	W	D	L	GF	GA	GD	Pts
1	Örebro SK	26	15	9	2	37	9	+28	39
2	IFK Eskilstuna	26	13	8	5	57	28	+29	34
3	Vasalunds IF	26	13	8	5	47	28	+19	34
4	Gefle IF	26	11	11	4	44	25	+19	33
5	Åtvidabergs FF	26	9	11	6	35	29	+6	29
6	IF Brommapojkarna	26	10	8	8	29	31	−2	28
7	Västerås SK	26	11	5	10	46	36	+10	27
8	IFK Holmsund	26	9	9	8	27	32	−5	27
9	BK Forward	26	5	13	8	28	30	−2	23
10	Luleå FF/IFK	26	6	10	10	19	27	−8	22
11	Karlstads BK	26	6	8	12	33	44	−11	20
12	Väsby IK	26	4	11	11	24	39	−15	19
13	Skellefteå AIK	26	4	8	14	25	57	−32	16
14	IFK Mora	26	2	9	15	17	53	−36	13

=== Södra ===
Pos	Team	Pld	W	D	L	GF	GA	GD	Pts
1	Halmstads BK	26	16	6	4	50	20	+30	38
2	Mjällby AIF	26	16	6	4	39	21	+18	38
3	Kalmar AIK	26	15	5	6	50	39	+11	35
4	IK Oddevold	26	9	10	7	47	27	+20	28
5	BK Häcken	26	12	4	10	49	37	+12	28
6	Landskrona BoIS	26	9	10	7	31	27	+4	28
7	Karlskrona AIF	26	10	7	9	34	38	−4	27
8	Markaryds IF	26	10	5	11	34	38	−4	25
9	Trelleborgs FF	26	9	6	11	45	46	−1	24
10	IF Elfsborg	26	7	9	10	34	35	−1	23
11	Ifö/Bromölla IF	26	6	8	12	28	41	−13	20
12	Falkenbergs FF	26	7	6	13	36	56	−20	20
13	Myresjö IF	26	7	5	14	31	48	−17	19
14	IFK Hässleholm	26	3	5	18	28	63	−35	11
