= 1990 in Swedish football =

The 1990 season in Swedish football, starting January 1990 and ending December 1990:

== Honours ==
=== Official titles ===
Title	Team	Reason
Swedish Champions 1990	IFK Göteborg	Winners of Allsvenskan play-off
Swedish Cup Champions 1989–90	Djurgårdens IF	Winners of Svenska Cupen

=== Competitions ===
Level	Competition	Team
1st level	Allsvenskan 1990	IFK Göteborg
1st level	Allsvenskan play-off 1990	IFK Göteborg
2nd level	Division 1 Norra 1990	GIF Sundsvall
2nd level	Division 1 Södra 1990	BK Häcken
Cup	Svenska Cupen 1989–90	Djurgårdens IF

== Promotions, relegations and qualifications ==
=== Promotions ===
Promoted from	Promoted to	Team	Reason
Division 1 Norra 1990	Allsvenskan 1991	GIF Sundsvall	Winners of promotion play-off
Division 2 1990	Division 1 Norra 1991	IFK Sundsvall	Winners of Norra
Division 2 1990	Division 1 Norra 1991	Enköpings SK	Winners of promotion play-off
Division 2 1990	Division 1 Norra 1991	IK Sirius	Winners of promotion play-off
Division 2 1990	Division 1 Östra 1991	Degerfors IF	Winners of Västra
Division 2 1990	Division 1 Västra 1991	Mjölby AI	Winners of Östra
Division 2 1990	Division 1 Södra 1991	Myresjö IF	Winners of Södra

=== League transfers ===
Transferred from	Transferred to	Team	Reason
Division 1 Norra 1990	Division 1 Östra 1991	IF Brommapojkarna	Geographic composition
Division 1 Norra 1990	Division 1 Östra 1991	IFK Eskilstuna	Geographic composition
Division 1 Norra 1990	Division 1 Östra 1991	BK Forward	Geographic composition
Division 1 Norra 1990	Division 1 Östra 1991	Spårvägens GoIF	Geographic composition
Division 1 Norra 1990	Division 1 Östra 1991	Vasalunds IF	Geographic composition
Division 1 Norra 1990	Division 1 Östra 1991	Väsby IK	Geographic composition
Division 1 Norra 1990	Division 1 Västra 1991	Motala AIF	Geographic composition
Division 1 Södra 1990	Division 1 Västra 1991	Gunnilse IS	Geographic composition
Division 1 Södra 1990	Division 1 Västra 1991	BK Häcken	Geographic composition
Division 1 Södra 1990	Division 1 Västra 1991	Jonsereds IF	Geographic composition
Division 1 Södra 1990	Division 1 Västra 1991	IK Oddevold	Geographic composition
Division 1 Södra 1990	Division 1 Västra 1991	Västra Frölunda IF	Geographic composition

=== Relegations ===
Relegated from	Relegated to	Team	Reason
Allsvenskan 1990	Division 1 Norra 1991	IK Brage	10th team
Allsvenskan 1990	Division 1 Västra 1991	Örgryte IS	11th team
Allsvenskan 1990	Division 1 Östra 1991	Hammarby IF	12th team
Division 1 Norra 1990	—	IFK Holmsund	13th team
Division 1 Norra 1990	Division 2 1991	Tyresö FF	14th team
Division 1 Södra 1990	Division 2 1991	Mjällby AIF	13th team
Division 1 Södra 1990	Division 2 1991	Karlskrona AIF	14th team

=== International qualifications ===
Qualified for	Enters	Team	Reason
European Cup 1991–92	1st round	IFK Göteborg	Winners of Allsvenskan
UEFA Cup 1991–92	1st round	Örebro SK	3rd team in Allsvenskan
UEFA Cup 1991–92	1st round	Östers IF	4th team in Allsvenskan
UEFA Cup Winners' Cup 1990–91	1st round	Djurgårdens IF	Winners of Svenska Cupen
International Football Cup 1991	Group stage	IFK Norrköping	Unknown
International Football Cup 1991	Group stage	Örebro SK	Unknown
International Football Cup 1991	Group stage	Djurgårdens IF	Unknown
International Football Cup 1991	Group stage	Malmö FF	Unknown
International Football Cup 1991	Group stage	Hammarby IF	Unknown

== Domestic results ==
=== Allsvenskan 1990 ===
	Team	Pld	W	D	L	GF		GA	GD	Pts
1	IFK Göteborg	22	14	3	5	39	–	22	+17	45
2	IFK Norrköping	22	12	4	6	41	–	23	+18	40
3	Örebro SK	22	10	6	6	23	–	17	+6	36
4	Östers IF	22	10	6	6	28	–	27	+1	36
5	Djurgårdens IF	22	9	6	7	37	–	23	+14	33
6	Malmö FF	22	6	10	6	20	–	15	+5	28
7	GAIS	22	7	7	8	17	–	17	0	28
8	AIK	22	8	3	11	25	–	39	-14	27
9	Halmstads BK	22	7	5	10	27	–	34	-7	26
10	IK Brage	22	5	9	8	23	–	26	-3	24
11	Örgryte IS	22	6	3	13	22	–	40	-18	21
12	Hammarby IF	22	5	4	13	32	–	51	-19	19

=== Allsvenskan play-off 1990 ===
Semi-finals

October 13, 1990

Örebro SK	1–1	IFK Göteborg

?, ?
October 21, 1990

IFK Göteborg	2–1	Örebro SK

?, ?

October 13, 1990

Östers IF	4–3	IFK Norrköping

?, ?
October 20, 1990

IFK Norrköping	(ag) 2–1	Östers IF

?, ?

Final

October 28, 1990

IFK Norrköping	0–3	IFK Göteborg

Idrottsparken, Norrköping
November 3, 1990

IFK Göteborg	0–0	IFK Norrköping

Ullevi, Gothenburg

=== Allsvenskan promotion play-off 1990 ===
October 20, 1990

BK Häcken	4–2	GIF Sundsvall

?, Gothenburg
October 28, 1990

GIF Sundsvall	4–1	BK Häcken

?, Timrå

=== Division 1 Norra 1990 ===
	Team	Pld	W	D	L	GF		GA	GD	Pts
1	GIF Sundsvall	26	19	4	3	69	–	27	+42	61
2	Vasalunds IF	26	15	4	7	45	–	21	+24	49
3	IF Brommapojkarna	26	15	4	7	46	–	29	+17	49
4	Spårvägens GoIF	26	13	6	7	55	–	37	+18	45
5	Västerås SK	26	12	5	9	46	–	31	+15	41
6	Kiruna FF	26	11	5	10	50	–	39	+11	38
7	IFK Luleå	26	10	8	8	37	–	28	+9	38
8	Gefle IF	26	12	2	12	35	–	38	-3	38
9	BK Forward	26	8	11	7	33	–	29	+4	35
10	Motala AIF	26	9	7	10	41	–	44	-3	34
11	Väsby IK	26	9	5	12	33	–	44	-11	32
12	IFK Eskilstuna	26	7	7	12	34	–	45	-11	28
13	IFK Holmsund	26	2	6	18	16	–	68	-52	12
14	Tyresö FF	26	1	4	21	18	–	78	-60	7

=== Division 1 Södra 1990 ===
	Team	Pld	W	D	L	GF		GA	GD	Pts
1	BK Häcken	26	14	9	3	53	–	23	+30	51
2	Helsingborgs IF	26	14	8	4	37	–	19	+18	50
3	Västra Frölunda IF	26	15	4	7	38	–	27	+11	49
4	Trelleborgs FF	26	13	3	10	41	–	33	+8	42
5	Jonsereds IF	26	10	8	8	38	–	30	+8	38
6	Kalmar AIK	26	10	6	10	35	–	41	-6	36
7	IK Oddevold	26	9	6	11	33	–	34	-1	33
8	Kalmar FF	26	9	5	12	32	–	34	-2	32
9	Markaryds IF	26	8	7	11	30	–	43	-13	31
10	IF Elfsborg	26	7	9	10	30	–	35	-5	30
11	Gunnilse IS	26	7	8	11	31	–	34	-3	29
12	Landskrona BoIS	26	7	8	11	30	–	39	-9	29
13	Mjällby AIF	26	7	7	12	27	–	37	-10	28
14	Karlskrona AIF	26	5	6	15	22	–	48	-26	21

=== Division 1 promotion play-off 1990 ===
October 13, 1990

Skövde AIK	1–1	Enköpings SK

?, ?
October 20, 1990

Enköpings SK	1–0	Skövde AIK

?, ?

October 13, 1990

Varbergs BoIS	1–3	IK Sirius

?, ?
October 20, 1990

IK Sirius	1–1	Varbergs BoIS

?, ?

=== Svenska Cupen 1989–90 ===
Final

May 22, 1990

Djurgårdens IF	3–0	BK Häcken

Råsunda, Solna

== National team results ==
February 14, 1990
Friendly
№ 658

United Arab Emirates	2–1	Sweden
Al-Taliyani 64'; Bilal 74'		Schwarz 82'

Al-Maktoum Stadium(?), Dubai
Attendance: 3,000
Referee: al-Mulla (United Arab Emirates)

February 17, 1990
Friendly
№ 659

United Arab Emirates	0–2	Sweden
		Rehn 24'; Ingesson 84'

Al-Maktoum Stadium(?), Dubai
Attendance: 4,200
Referee: Bujsaim (United Arab Emirates)

February 21, 1990
Friendly
№ 660

Belgium	0–0	Sweden

Heysel Stadium, Brussels
Attendance: 3,537
Referee: Kaupe (Austria)

April 11, 1990
Friendly
№ 661

Algeria	1–1	Sweden
Serrar 14' (p)		Schwarz 48' (p)

Stade 5 Juillet 1962, Algiers
Attendance: 300
Referee: Medjiba (Algeria)

April 25, 1990
Friendly
№ 662

Sweden	4–2	Wales
Brolin 20', 25'; Ingesson 53', 72'		Saunders 13', 64'

Råsunda, Solna
Attendance: 13,981
Referee: Ruokonen (Finland)

May 27, 1990
Friendly
№ 663

Sweden	6–0	Finland
Magnusson 5'; Limpar 56'; Brolin 58', 59'; Larsson 66' (p); Thern 74'

Råsunda, Solna
Attendance: 12,914
Referee: Presberg (Norway)

June 10, 1990
1990 World Cup group stage
№ 664

Brazil	2–1	Sweden
Careca 41', 62'		Brolin 78'

Stadio delle Alpi, Turin
Attendance: 62,628
Referee: Lanese (Italy)

June 16, 1990
1990 World Cup group stage
№ 665

Scotland	2–1	Sweden
McCall 11'; Johnston 81' (p)		Strömberg 85'

Stadio Luigi Ferraris, Genoa
Attendance: 31,823
Referee: Maciel (Paraguay)

June 20, 1990
1990 World Cup group stage
№ 666

Sweden	1–2	Costa Rica
Ekström 32'		Flores 74'; Medford 87'

Stadio Luigi Ferraris, Genoa
Attendance: 30,223
Referee: Petrović (Yugoslavia)

August 22, 1990
Friendly
№ 667

Norway	1–2	Sweden
Ahlsen 2' (p)		Engqvist 40'; Fjellström 74'

Stavanger Stadion, Stavanger
Attendance: 10,065
Referee: Nielsen (Denmark)

September 5, 1990
Friendly
№ 668

Sweden	0–1	Denmark
		Christensen 84'

Arosvallen, Västerås
Attendance: 9,034
Referee: Hope (Scotland)

September 26, 1990
Friendly
№ 669

Sweden	2–0	Bulgaria
Corneliusson 64'; Andersson 73'

Råsunda, Solna
Attendance: 6,954
Referee: Damgaard (Denmark)

October 10, 1990
Friendly
№ 670

Sweden	1–3	West Germany
Rehn 70' (p)		Klinsmann 29'; Völler 39'; Brehme 44'

Råsunda, Solna
Attendance: 20,396
Referee: Worrall (England)
