= 1989 Division 1 (Swedish football) =

Swedish League Division 1
- Season: 1989
- Champions: Hammarby IF; Östers IF
- Promoted: Hammarby IF; Östers IF
- Relegated: Åtvidabergs FF; Karlstad BK; Ifö/Bromölla IF; Falkenbergs FF

Statistics of Swedish football Division 1 in season 1989.

== Overview ==
It was contested by 28 teams, and Hammarby IF and Östers IF won the championship.

== League standings ==
=== Norra ===
Pos	Team	Pld	W	D	L	GF	GA	GD	Pts
1	Hammarby IF	26	16	4	6	49	24	+25	36
2	Vasalunds IF	26	15	6	5	43	18	+25	36
3	Kiruna FF	26	13	8	5	43	25	+18	34
4	BK Forward	26	13	5	8	36	27	+9	31
5	Motala AIF	26	12	6	8	38	27	+11	30
6	Luleå FF/IFK	26	11	8	7	30	27	+3	30
7	Västerås SK	26	10	9	7	31	29	+2	29
8	Gefle IF	26	10	6	10	36	29	+7	26
9	IFK Eskilstuna	26	10	4	12	31	25	+6	24
10	IF Brommapojkarna	26	8	8	10	29	35	−6	24
11	Väsby IK	26	8	7	11	30	35	−5	23
12	IFK Holmsund	26	7	4	15	24	50	−26	18
13	Åtvidabergs FF	26	4	9	13	27	43	−16	17
14	Karlstad BK	26	2	2	22	13	59	−46	6

=== Södra ===
Pos	Team	Pld	W	D	L	GF	GA	GD	Pts
1	Östers IF	26	17	9	0	69	20	+49	43
2	Trelleborgs FF	26	11	10	5	52	38	+14	32
3	IF Elfsborg	26	10	12	4	46	33	+13	32
4	IK Oddevold	26	11	9	6	53	58	−5	31
5	Kalmar FF	26	10	7	9	40	35	+5	27
6	Mjällby AIF	26	10	7	9	36	34	+2	27
7	BK Häcken	26	9	8	9	45	38	+7	26
8	Landskrona BoIS	26	7	8	11	35	43	−8	22
9	Markaryds IF	26	8	6	12	28	38	−10	22
10	Jonsereds IF	26	9	4	13	36	49	−13	22
11	Karlskrona AIF	26	8	6	12	34	53	−19	22
12	Kalmar AIK	26	8	5	13	36	42	−6	21
13	Ifö/Bromölla IF	26	6	9	11	21	43	−22	21
14	Falkenbergs FF	26	4	8	14	35	62	−27	16
