= 1987 Division 1 (Swedish football) =

Swedish League Division 1
- Season: 1987
- Champions: Djurgårdens IF; GAIS
- Promoted: Djurgårdens IF; GAIS
- Relegated: IFK Västerås; Degerfors IF; Kalmar FF; Skövde AIK

Statistics of Swedish football Division 1 in season 1987.

== Overview ==
It was contested by 28 teams, and Djurgårdens IF and GAIS won the championship.

== League standings ==
=== Norra ===
Pos	Team	Pld	W	D	L	GF	GA	GD	Pts
1	Djurgårdens IF	26	16	6	4	60	26	+34	38
2	IFK Eskilstuna	26	14	7	5	48	30	+18	35
3	Örebro SK	26	12	9	5	43	25	+18	33
4	Gefle IF	26	13	7	6	43	27	+16	33
5	Västerås SK	26	12	6	8	35	20	+15	30
6	BK Forward	26	12	6	8	37	28	+9	30
7	IF Brommapojkarna	26	9	7	10	48	52	−4	25
8	Karlstads BK	26	10	5	11	41	45	−4	25
9	Luleå FF/IFK	26	8	9	9	30	38	−8	25
10	Skellefteå AIK	26	9	6	11	28	29	−1	24
11	Vasalunds IF	26	6	8	12	36	47	−11	20
12	IFK Mora	26	8	4	14	25	41	−16	20
13	IFK Västerås	26	6	5	15	24	56	−32	17
14	Degerfors IF	26	2	5	19	23	58	−35	9

=== Södra ===
Pos	Team	Pld	W	D	L	GF	GA	GD	Pts
1	GAIS	26	15	7	4	47	16	+31	37
2	Trelleborgs FF	26	12	12	2	47	20	+27	36
3	Kalmar AIK	26	12	7	7	38	33	+5	31
4	Myresjö IF	26	10	8	8	45	41	+4	28
5	IK Oddevold	26	10	6	10	39	36	+3	26
6	Åtvidabergs FF	26	7	11	8	28	28	0	25
7	Ifö/Bromölla IF	26	8	9	9	27	30	−3	25
8	Mjällby AIF	26	6	13	7	23	29	−6	25
9	BK Häcken	26	9	7	10	24	31	−7	25
10	Landskrona BoIS	26	8	8	10	24	33	−9	24
11	IFK Hässleholm	26	6	10	10	28	30	−2	22
12	Karlskrona AIF	26	7	8	11	24	33	−9	22
13	Kalmar FF	26	8	5	13	30	38	−8	21
14	Skövde AIK	26	5	7	14	23	43	−20	17
