= 1993 Division 1 (Swedish football) =

Swedish League Division 1
- Season: 1993
- Champions: Hammarby IF; Landskrona BoIS
- Promoted: Hammarby IF; Landskrona BoIS
- Relegated: Ope IF; IFK Sundsvall; Assyriska Föreningen; Myresjö IF; IFK Uddevalla; Skövde AIK; Mjällby AIF

Statistics of Swedish football Division 1 in season 1993.

== Overview ==
It was contested by 28 teams, and Hammarby IF and Landskrona BoIS won the championship.

== League standings ==
=== Norra ===
Pos	Team	Pld	W	D	L	GF	GA	GD	Pts
1	Hammarby IF	26	19	2	5	66	25	+41	59
2	Vasalunds IF	26	17	2	7	65	35	+30	53
3	Djurgårdens IF	26	13	7	6	58	31	+27	46
4	Spårvägens FF	26	11	10	5	42	20	+22	43
5	IFK Luleå	26	11	8	7	50	33	+17	41
6	Gefle IF	26	12	5	9	37	31	+6	41
7	Umeå FC	26	11	6	9	46	39	+7	39
8	GIF Sundsvall	26	11	5	10	45	47	−2	38
9	IF Brommapojkarna	26	10	4	12	30	33	−3	34
10	Spånga IS	26	9	6	11	31	38	−7	33
11	IK Sirius	26	8	5	13	32	47	−15	29
12	Ope IF	26	4	7	15	25	52	−27	19
13	IFK Sundsvall	26	5	2	19	32	75	−43	17
14	Assyriska Föreningen	26	4	5	17	23	76	−53	17

=== Södra ===
Pos	Team	Pld	W	D	L	GF	GA	GD	Pts
1	Landskrona BoIS	26	19	4	3	71	22	+49	61
2	IFK Hässleholm	26	16	4	6	56	32	+24	52
3	Kalmar FF	26	13	6	7	44	30	+14	45
4	IF Elfsborg	26	13	2	11	61	51	+10	41
5	GAIS	26	12	4	10	36	35	+1	40
6	Jonsereds IF	26	11	3	12	56	66	−10	36
7	Gunnilse IS	26	10	4	12	38	50	−12	34
8	IK Oddevold	26	8	8	10	42	50	−8	32
9	BK Forward	26	9	4	13	40	46	−6	31
10	Lunds BK	26	7	9	10	34	36	−2	30
11	Myresjö IF	26	8	6	12	44	60	−16	30
12	IFK Uddevalla	26	7	7	12	44	50	−6	28
13	Skövde AIK	26	8	3	15	44	60	−16	27
14	Mjällby AIF	26	6	6	14	29	51	−22	24
