= Väsby IK =

Väsby IK may refer to:

- Väsby IK FK, defunct football club
- Väsby IK HK, ice hockey club
