= 2002 Division 2 (Swedish football) =

Swedish football league season

The following are the statistics of the Swedish football Division 2 for the 2002 season.

== League standings ==
=== Division 2 Norrland ===
Pos	Team	Pld	W	D	L	GF	GA	GD	Pts	Qualification or relegation
1	Boden	22	14	5	3	55	19	+36	47	Promotion Playoffs
2	Umeå FC	22	14	4	4	56	23	+33	46	
3	Robertsfors	22	12	7	3	34	14	+20	43	
4	IFK Luleå	22	12	5	5	31	22	+9	41	
5	Östersunds FK	22	10	6	6	34	21	+13	36	
6	IFK Timrå	22	10	5	7	34	32	+2	35	
7	Piteå IF	22	8	4	10	29	31	−2	28	
8	Friska Viljor	22	7	6	9	23	30	−7	27	
9	Skellefteå AIK	22	7	2	13	29	32	−3	23	
10	Kiruna	22	5	4	13	20	48	−28	19	2003 Division 3 Relegation Playoffs
11	Söderhamn (R)	22	2	6	14	21	55	−34	12	Relegation to Division 3
12	Älvsbyn (R)	22	1	6	15	16	55	−39	9	Relegation to Division 3

Rules for classification: 1) points; 2) goal difference; 3) number of goals scored.
(R) Relegated

=== Division 2 Västra Svealand ===
Pos	Team	Pld	W	D	L	GF	GA	GD	Pts	Qualification or relegation
1	BK Forward	22	15	3	4	43	24	+19	48	Promotion Playoffs
2	Rynninge	22	12	7	3	47	22	+25	43	
3	Degerfors IF	22	12	4	6	49	35	+14	40	
4	Syrianska Föreningen	22	10	8	4	46	25	+21	38	
5	IK Sleipner	22	10	4	8	43	42	+1	34	
6	Eskilstuna City	22	9	5	8	39	38	+1	32	
7	Ludvika FK	22	8	4	10	36	38	−2	28	
8	Vallentuna	22	8	3	11	44	49	−5	27	
9	IFK Ölme	22	8	3	11	43	50	−7	27	
10	Karlslunds IF	22	7	5	10	35	44	−9	26	2003 Division 3 Relegation Playoffs
11	Värtan (R)	22	4	2	16	29	54	−25	14	Relegation to Division 3
12	Eskilstuna Södra (R)	22	4	2	16	24	57	−33	14	Relegation to Division 3

Rules for classification: 1) points; 2) goal difference; 3) number of goals scored.
(R) Relegated

=== Division 2 Östra Svealand ===
Pos	Team	Pld	W	D	L	GF	GA	GD	Pts	Qualification or relegation
1	Väsby IK	22	16	3	3	51	20	+31	51	Promotion Playoffs
2	Visby IF Gute	22	12	3	7	44	31	+13	39	
3	Valsta Syrianska IK	22	9	9	4	36	26	+10	36	
4	Spårvägen	22	9	5	8	41	41	0	32	
5	Topkapi	22	10	2	10	34	34	0	32	
6	Essinge International FC	22	7	9	6	27	29	−2	30	
7	IK Sirius	22	8	6	8	40	37	+3	30	
8	Skiljebo SK	22	9	3	10	42	45	−3	30	
9	Slätta	22	5	9	8	28	41	−13	24	
10	Forssa	22	6	4	12	19	43	−24	22	2003 Division 3 Relegation Playoffs
11	IFK Lidingö (R)	22	6	3	13	35	49	−14	21	Relegation to Division 3
12	Sandvikens IF (R)	22	4	6	12	32	43	−11	18	Relegation to Division 3

Rules for classification: 1) points; 2) goal difference; 3) number of goals scored.
(R) Relegated

=== Division 2 Östra Götaland ===
Pos	Team	Pld	W	D	L	GF	GA	GD	Pts	Qualification or relegation
1	Husqvarna FF	22	14	6	2	54	27	+27	48	Promotion Playoffs
2	Linköping	22	13	5	4	46	29	+17	44	
3	IFK Värnamo	22	10	6	6	48	36	+12	36	
4	Tord	22	10	5	7	47	43	+4	35	
5	Jönköpings Södra IF	22	8	7	7	36	31	+5	31	
6	Myresjö IF	22	9	4	9	35	35	0	31	
7	Tidaholms GIF	22	8	5	9	38	40	−2	29	
8	Grimsås	22	7	7	8	33	32	+1	28	
9	Motala AIK	22	6	8	8	29	30	−1	26	
10	Nybro IF	22	6	6	10	28	35	−7	24	2003 Division 3 Relegation Playoffs
11	Norrby IF (R)	22	5	4	13	20	47	−27	19	Relegation to Division 3
12	Hjulsbro (R)	22	2	5	15	20	49	−29	11	Relegation to Division 3

Rules for classification: 1) points; 2) goal difference; 3) number of goals scored.
(R) Relegated

=== Division 2 Västra Götaland ===
Pos	Team	Pld	W	D	L	GF	GA	GD	Pts	Qualification or relegation
1	FC Trollhättan	22	15	4	3	48	15	+33	49	Promotion Playoffs
2	GAIS	22	11	8	3	54	24	+30	41	
3	Qviding FIF	22	12	5	5	41	26	+15	41	
4	Gunnilse	22	12	2	8	41	31	+10	38	
5	Skärhamn	22	11	5	6	44	36	+8	38	
6	Panos Ljungskile	22	10	2	10	33	31	+2	32	
7	Torslanda IK	22	8	6	8	38	28	+10	30	
8	Ytterby	22	8	3	11	32	43	−11	27	
9	Lunden	22	7	5	10	27	44	−17	26	
10	Sandared	22	5	3	14	32	57	−25	18	2003 Division 3 Relegation Playoffs
11	IF Heimer (R)	22	4	6	12	29	58	−29	18	Relegation to Division 3
12	Askim (R)	22	2	5	15	20	56	−36	11	Relegation to Division 3

Rules for classification: 1) points; 2) goal difference; 3) number of goals scored.
(R) Relegated

=== Division 2 Södra Götaland ===
Pos	Team	Pld	W	D	L	GF	GA	GD	Pts	Qualification or relegation
1	Falkenbergs FF	22	14	5	3	52	15	+37	47	Promotion Playoffs
2	Lunds BK	22	13	7	2	48	17	+31	46	
3	Högaborg	22	12	3	7	36	36	0	39	
4	IFK Hässleholm	22	10	5	7	51	40	+11	35	
5	Karlskrona	22	9	5	8	40	44	−4	32	
6	Växjö Norra IF	22	8	4	10	46	42	+4	28	
7	Laholm	22	8	4	10	27	35	−8	28	
8	Höllvikens GIF	22	7	5	10	27	29	−2	26	
9	Ystad	22	7	5	10	35	40	−5	26	
10	IF Leikin	22	7	4	11	25	46	−21	25	2003 Division 3 Relegation Playoffs
11	Helsingborgs Södra BIS (R)	22	7	3	12	40	46	−6	24	Relegation to Division 3
12	IFK Trelleborg (R)	22	4	2	16	19	66	−47	14	Relegation to Division 3

Rules for classification: 1) points; 2) goal difference; 3) number of goals scored.
(R) Relegated
