= 2004 Division 2 (Swedish football) =

Swedish football league season

The following are the statistics of the Swedish football Division 2 for the 2004 season.

== League standings ==
=== Division 2 Norrland ===
Pos	Team	Pld	W	D	L	GF	GA	GD	Pts	Qualification or relegation
1	Umeå FC	22	17	3	2	65	22	+43	54	Promotion Playoffs
2	IFK Timrå	22	14	3	5	57	27	+30	45	
3	IFK Luleå	22	13	4	5	48	24	+24	43	
4	Östersunds FK	22	11	5	6	35	28	+7	38	
5	Robertsfors	22	11	2	9	41	32	+9	35	
6	Sandvikens IF	22	10	2	10	44	39	+5	32	
7	Kiruna	22	8	6	8	32	39	−7	30	
8	Spårvägen	22	8	3	11	29	36	−7	27	
9	Anundsjö	22	6	4	12	27	43	−16	22	
10	Piteå IF	22	6	2	14	31	48	−17	20	Division 3 Relegation Playoffs
11	Skellefteå AIK (R)	22	4	4	14	22	56	−34	16	Relegation to Division 3
12	Luleå SK (R)	22	3	4	15	23	60	−37	13	Relegation to Division 3

Rules for classification: 1) points; 2) goal difference; 3) number of goals scored.
(R) Relegated

=== Division 2 Västra Svealand ===
Pos	Team	Pld	W	D	L	GF	GA	GD	Pts	Qualification or relegation
1	Degerfors IF	22	14	4	4	55	24	+31	46	Promotion Playoffs
2	IFK Ölme	22	15	1	6	47	29	+18	46	
3	BK Forward	22	10	7	5	34	32	+2	37	
4	IF Sylvia	22	9	7	6	41	31	+10	34	
5	Skiljebo SK	22	9	6	7	41	39	+2	33	
6	Karlslunds IF	22	8	4	10	35	38	−3	28	
7	Falu BS	22	8	4	10	36	40	−4	28	
8	Carlstad United BK	22	6	8	8	27	31	−4	26	
9	Västerås IK	22	7	3	12	35	38	−3	24	
10	Eskilstuna City	22	6	6	10	27	42	−15	24	Division 3 Relegation Playoffs
11	Rynninge (R)	22	6	5	11	35	49	−14	23	Relegation to Division 3
12	Ludvika FK (R)	22	3	7	12	30	50	−20	16	Relegation to Division 3

Rules for classification: 1) points; 2) goal difference; 3) number of goals scored.
(R) Relegated

=== Division 2 Östra Svealand ===
Pos	Team	Pld	W	D	L	GF	GA	GD	Pts	Qualification or relegation
1	Väsby IK	22	14	3	5	46	24	+22	45	Promotion Playoffs
2	Vasalund/Essinge IF	22	13	2	7	37	30	+7	41	
3	Valsta Syrianska IK	22	13	4	5	45	19	+26	40	
4	Nyköpings BIS	22	11	1	10	35	30	+5	34	
5	Syrianska FC	22	9	5	8	35	35	0	32	
6	Visby IF Gute	22	9	3	10	36	32	+4	30	
7	Topkapi	22	9	3	10	36	39	−3	30	
8	Gamla Upsala	22	8	6	8	26	36	−10	30	
9	Enskede	22	7	7	8	32	33	−1	28	
10	IK Sirius	22	8	2	12	42	53	−11	26	Division 3 Relegation Playoffs
11	Vallentuna (R)	22	5	4	13	32	42	−10	19	Relegation to Division 3
12	Tyresö FF (R)	22	4	4	14	27	56	−29	16	Relegation to Division 3

Rules for classification: 1) points; 2) goal difference; 3) number of goals scored.
(R) Relegated

=== Division 2 Östra Götaland ===
Pos	Team	Pld	W	D	L	GF	GA	GD	Pts	Qualification or relegation
1	Husqvarna FF	22	17	2	3	68	29	+39	53	Promotion Playoffs
2	Norrby IF	22	16	4	2	58	23	+35	52	
3	Jönköpings Södra IF	22	15	4	3	73	34	+39	49	
4	IK Sleipner	22	10	4	8	50	45	+5	34	
5	Myresjö IF	22	10	4	8	45	40	+5	34	
6	IFK Värnamo	22	10	3	9	35	29	+6	33	
7	Grimsås	22	9	3	10	34	40	−6	30	
8	Oskarshamns AIK	22	8	5	9	31	40	−9	29	
9	Sandared	22	6	2	14	34	55	−21	20	
10	Tord	22	5	3	14	26	52	−26	18	Division 3 Relegation Playoffs
11	Växjö BK (R)	22	2	6	14	20	55	−35	12	Relegation to Division 3
12	Tidaholms GIF (R)	22	3	2	17	38	70	−32	11	Relegation to Division 3

Rules for classification: 1) points; 2) goal difference; 3) number of goals scored.
(R) Relegated

=== Division 2 Västra Götaland ===
Pos	Team	Pld	W	D	L	GF	GA	GD	Pts	Qualification or relegation
1	Ljungskile SK	22	11	7	4	38	19	+19	40	Promotion Playoffs
2	Floda	22	9	8	5	42	40	+2	35	
3	Torslanda IK	22	8	10	4	35	25	+10	34	
4	FC Trollhättan	22	9	7	6	35	27	+8	34	
5	Skärhamn	22	6	11	5	27	23	+4	29	
6	Gunnilse	22	7	8	7	30	29	+1	29	
7	Qviding FIF	22	8	5	9	37	39	−2	29	
8	IK Oddevold	22	6	9	7	31	34	−3	27	
9	Kinna	22	6	8	8	34	37	−3	26	
10	Skene	22	7	5	10	43	51	−8	26	Division 3 Relegation Playoffs
11	Jonsered (R)	22	6	4	12	27	49	−22	22	Relegation to Division 3
12	Ytterby (R)	22	5	6	11	31	37	−6	21	Relegation to Division 3

Rules for classification: 1) points; 2) goal difference; 3) number of goals scored.
(R) Relegated

=== Division 2 Södra Götaland ===
Pos	Team	Pld	W	D	L	GF	GA	GD	Pts	Qualification or relegation
1	Mjällby AIF	22	12	5	5	36	19	+17	41	Promotion Playoffs
2	Ängelholms FF	22	11	5	6	36	27	+9	38	
3	IFK Hässleholm	22	10	7	5	48	37	+11	37	
4	Bunkeflo	22	9	5	8	37	33	+4	32	
5	Laholm	22	8	6	8	31	33	−2	30	
6	Lunds BK	22	7	8	7	25	28	−3	29	
7	Kristianstads FF	22	7	7	8	38	40	−2	28	
8	IFK Malmö	22	8	4	10	29	34	−5	28	
9	Högaborg	22	6	9	7	29	32	−3	27	
10	Höllvikens GIF	22	6	6	10	36	41	−5	24	Division 3 Relegation Playoffs
11	Malmö Anadolu (R)	22	5	8	9	26	32	−6	23	Relegation to Division 3
12	Karlskrona (R)	22	4	8	10	26	41	−15	20	Relegation to Division 3

Rules for classification: 1) points; 2) goal difference; 3) number of goals scored.
(R) Relegated
