= Allan Borgvardt =

Danish footballer (born 1980)

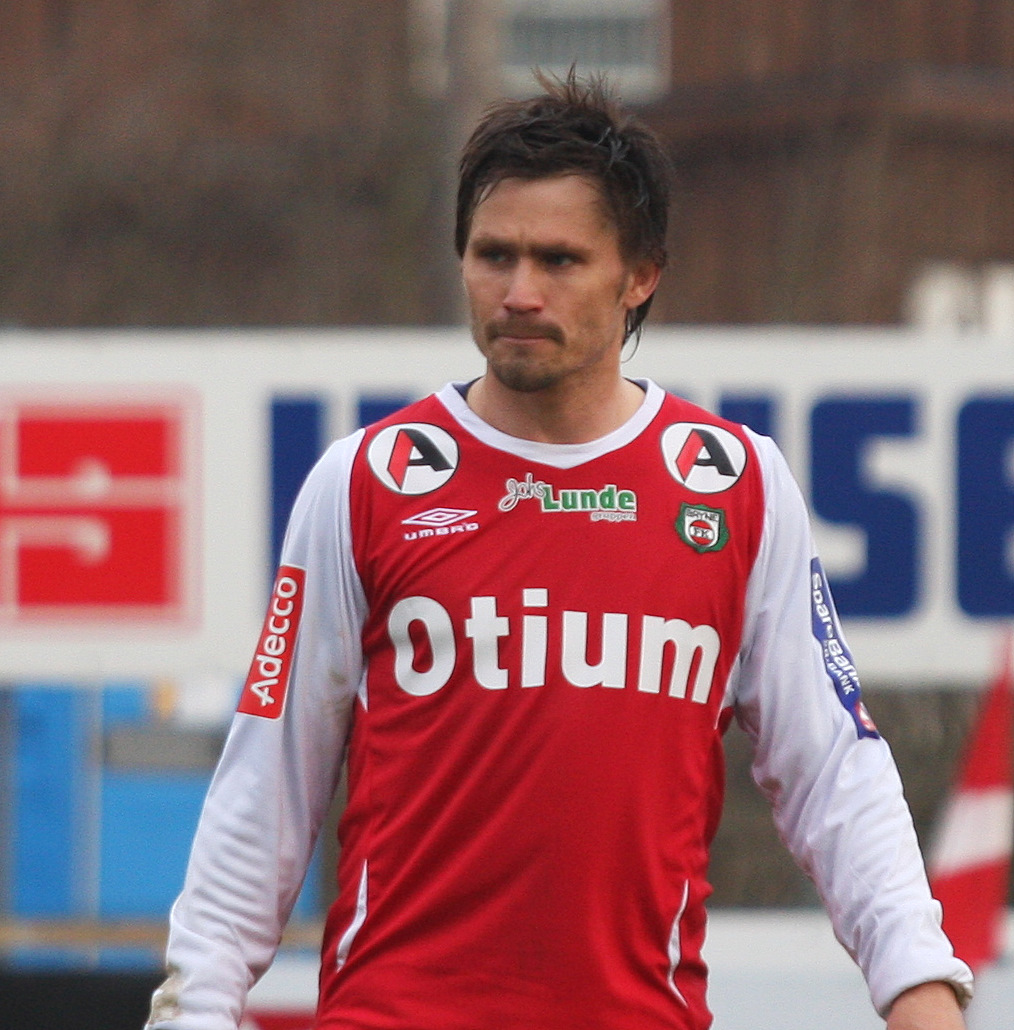

Personal information
- Full name: Allan Borgvardt
- Date of birth: 5 June 1980 (age 46)
- Place of birth: Bramming, Denmark
- Height: 1.80 m (5 ft 11 in)
- Position: Forward

Youth career
- –1995: Bramming BK

Senior career*
| Years | Team | Apps | (Gls) |
| 1995–1998 | Esbjerg fB | | |
| 1998–2003 | AGF | 62 | (4) |
| 2003–2005 | FH | 43 | (29) |
| 2005–2006 | Viking | 7 | (0) |
| 2006–2010 | Bryne | 97 | (38) |
| 2010–2011 | Sandnes Ulf | 28 | (10) |
| 2011–2015 | IF Sylvia | 95 | (60) |
| 2016–2019 | Svärtinge SK | 20 | (26) |

International career^{‡}
| 1995 | Denmark U16 | 2 | (0) |
| 1995 | Denmark U17 | 5 | (0) |
| 1998–1999 | Denmark U19 | 8 | (5) |
- * Club domestic league appearances and goals as of 25 November 2013 ‡ National team caps and goals as of 12 November 2012

Allan Borgvardt (born 5 June 1980) is a Danish former footballer.

Borgvardt got his senior breakthrough with Aarhus Gymnastikforening (AGF), playing 62 games for the club in the Danish Superliga from 1999 to 2002. He later played seven matches for Viking in Tippeligaen, before he played for Norwegian First Division side Bryne and Sandnes Ulf. He then played in Sweden for IF Sylvia and Svärtinge SK.

Borgvardt has played 15 games for various Danish youth selections, including 8 games and 5 goals for the Denmark national under-19 football team.
