= Mästerskapsserien =

- Founded: 1991
- Folded: 1992
- Country: Sweden
- Confederation: UEFA
- Number of clubs: 6
- Domestic cup: Svenska Cupen
- International cup(s): UEFA Champions League; UEFA Cup

Mästerskapsserien (Championship League) was a short-lived Swedish football league played 1991 and 1992 to decide the Swedish Champions. The top six teams from Allsvenskan qualified for Mästerskapsserien while the four bottom had to play the promotion and relegation Kvalsvenskan league with four (1991) and two (1992) teams from Division 1.

== Champions ==
The winners and runners-up of the two seasons were:

Season	Winners	Runners-up
1991	IFK Göteborg (1)	IFK Norrköping
1992	AIK (1)	IFK Norrköping
