= Ettan Fotboll =

Swedish football league

Ettan
- Founded: 2006; 20 years ago
- Country: Sweden
- Confederation: UEFA
- Divisions: 2
- Number of clubs: 32
- Level on pyramid: 3
- Promotion to: Superettan
- Relegation to: Division 2
- Current champions: FC Stockholm (North); Trelleborgs FF (South) (2026)
- Website: ettanfotboll.se
- Current: 2026 Ettan

Ettan Fotboll, or simply Ettan (English: the first [division]), which also is its common name in everyday speech, is the third level in the Swedish football league system and consists of 32 Swedish football teams. It was formerly simply known as Division 1. Division 1 was the second tier from 1987 to 1999, but was replaced by Superettan in 2000. It was reestablished for the 2006 season as the third tier below Superettan.

== History ==
The old Division 1 replaced Division 2 as the second highest level in 1987 and consisted of two separate leagues with 14 teams each, Norra (Northern) and Södra (Southern), except for the 1991 and 1992 seasons which comprised 32 teams in four leagues, adding Östra (Eastern) and Västra (Western). As of the 2018 season, both Norra and Södra leagues of Ettan are composed of 16 clubs, similar to Allsvenskan and Superettan. And the league is focus for developing young stars.

== The competition ==
There are 32 clubs in Ettan, divided in two groups of 16 teams each representing Northern and Southern Sweden. During the course of a season (starting in April and ending in November) each club plays the others twice, once at their home stadium and once at that of their opponents, for a total of 30 games. At the end of each season the three lowest placed teams of each group are relegated to Division 2 and the six winning teams from the six Division 2 leagues are promoted in their place. Furthermore, the fourth lowest placed team in each group plays a promotion/relegation play-off against the winner of one of the two Division 2 runner-up play-offs. The top team in each Ettan group is promoted to Superettan and the two lowest placed teams from Superettan are relegated in their place. The second placed teams in each Ettan group plays a promotion/relegation play-off against the third and fourth lowest teams in Superettan.

== Current clubs (2024 season) ==
=== Stadia and locations ===
Locations of the 2024 Ettan clubs
Red: Ettan Norra; Green: Ettan Södra

==== Norra ====
| Team | Location | Stadium | Capacity |
|---|---|---|---|
| Assyriska FF | Södertälje | Södertälje Fotbollsarena | 8,500 |
| AFC Eskilstuna | Eskilstuna | Tunavallen | 7,800 |
| FBK Karlstad | Karlstad | Örsholmen IP | |
| FC Stockholm Internazionale | Stockholm | Kristinebergs IP | 2,145 |
| Friska Viljor FC | Örnsköldsvik | Skyttis IP | |
| Hammarby Talang FF | Stockholm | Hammarby IP | 3,700 |
| IF Karlstad | Karlstad | Tingvalla IP | 10,000 |
| IFK Stocksund | Danderyd | Jurek Arena Danderyd | 1,000 |
| Karlbergs BK | Stockholm | Stadshagens IP | |
| Nordic United FC | Södertälje | Södertälje Fotbollsarena | 8,500 |
| Piteå IF | Piteå | LF Arena | 6,000 |
| Sollentuna FK | Sollentuna | Sollentunavallen | 4,500 |
| Täby FK | Täby | Tibblevallen | 1,000 |
| Umeå FC | Umeå | Umeå Energi Arena | 10,000 |
| Vasalund IF | Solna | Skytteholms IP | 5,200 |
| Örebro Syrianska IF | Örebro | Örnsro IP | 1,000 |

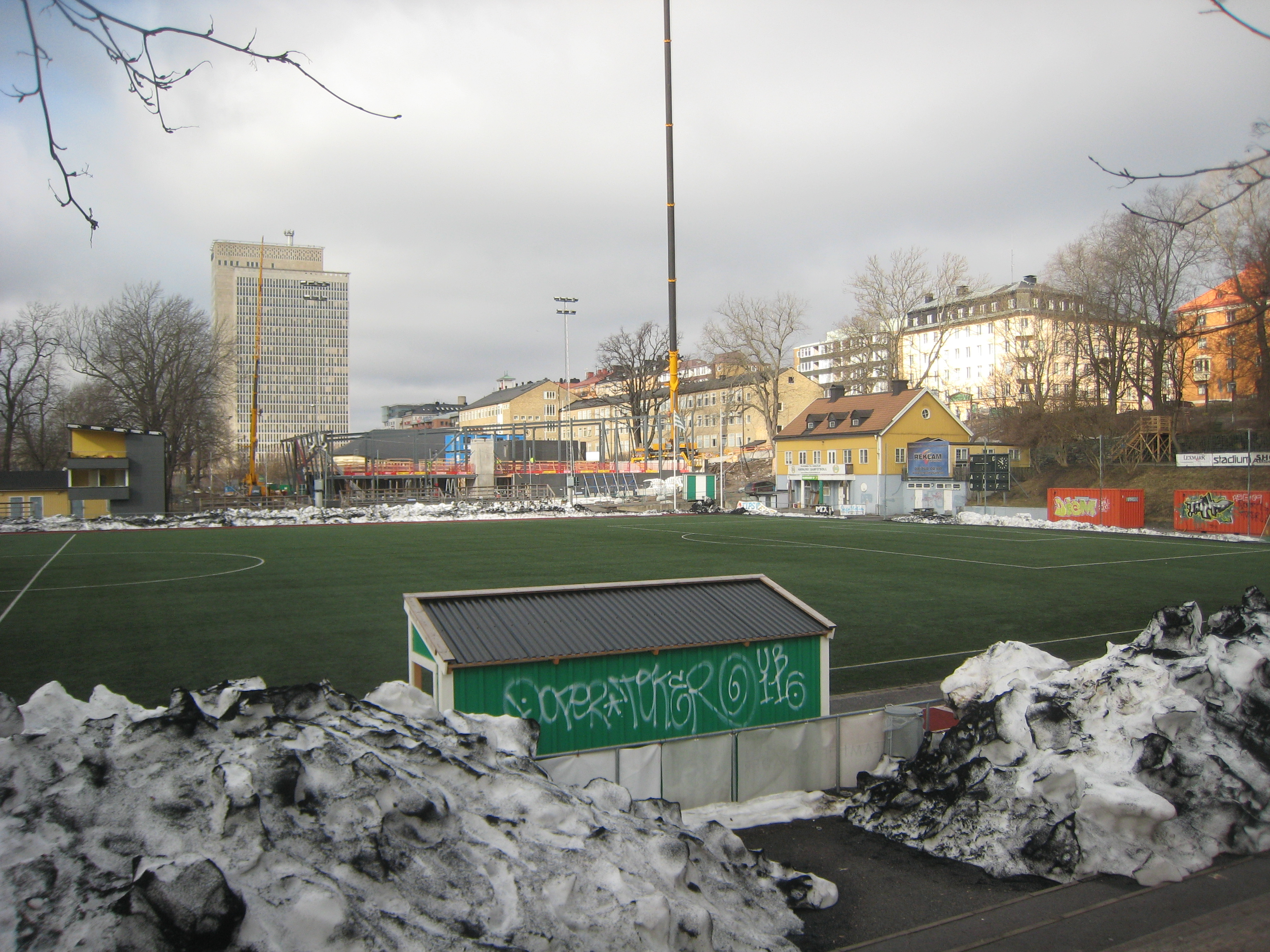
Hammarby IP in Stockholm.

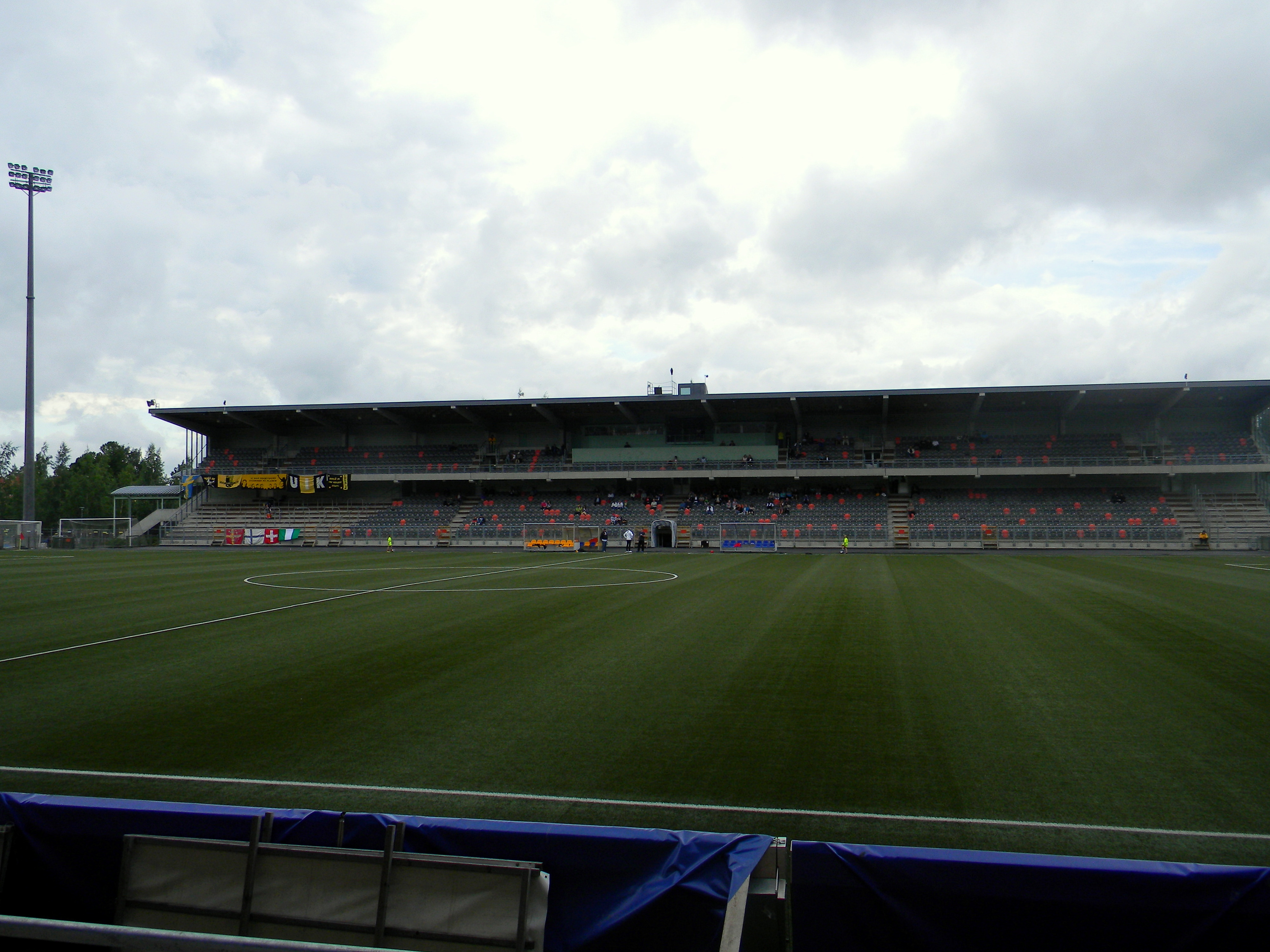
Umeå Energi Arena in Umeå.

==== Södra ====
| Team | Location | Stadium | Stadium capacity^{1} |
|---|---|---|---|
| Ariana FC | Malmö | Kroksbacks Idrottsplats | |
| BK Olympic | Malmö | Lindängens IP | |
| Eskilsminne IF | Helsingborg | Harlyckans IP | |
| Falkenbergs FF | Falkenberg | Falcon Alkoholfri Arena | 5,500 |
| FC Rosengård 1917 | Malmö | Rosengårds Södra IP | |
| FC Trollhättan | Trollhättan | Edsborgs IP | 5,100 |
| Jönköpings Södra IF | Jönköping | Stadsparksvallen | 7,300 |
| Ljungskile SK | Ljungskile | Skarsjövallen | 8,000 |
| Lunds BK | Lund | Klostergårdens IP | 8,560 |
| Norrby IF | Borås | Borås Arena | 16,200 |
| Onsala BK | Onsala | Rydets IP | |
| Oskarshamns AIK | Oskarshamn | Arena Oskarshamn | 2,000 |
| Torns IF | Stångby | Tornvallen | 1,500 |
| Torslanda IK | Gothenburg | Torslandavallen | 1,500 |
| Tvååkers IF | Tvååker | Övrevi IP | 1,000 |
| Ängelholms FF | Ängelholm | Ängelholms IP | 4,000 |

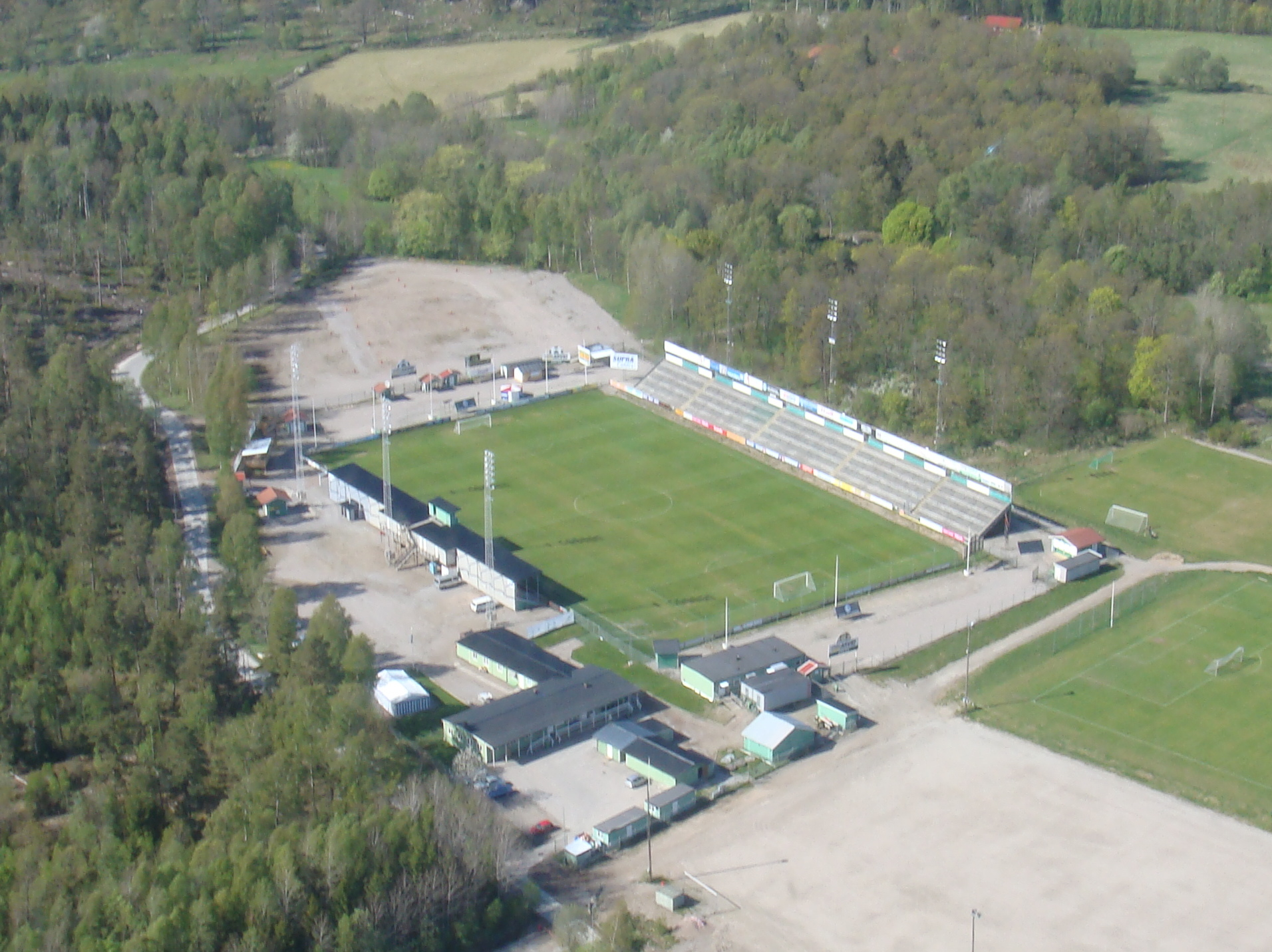
Skarsjövallen in Ljungskile.

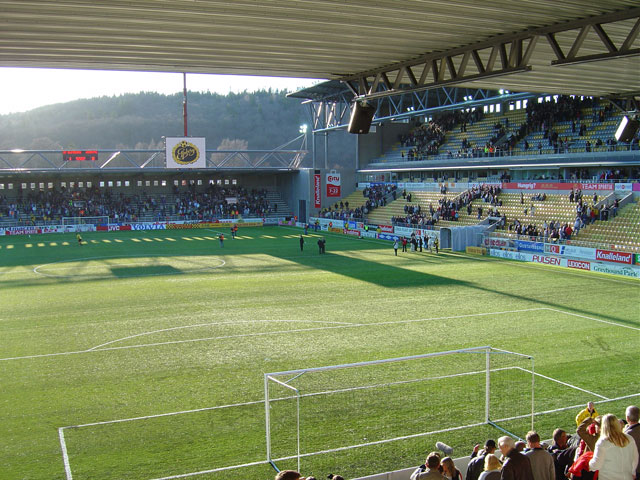
Borås Arena in Borås.

== Seasons: previous winners ==
=== Second tier ===
| Season | League | Won Promotion | Won Promotion Playoffs | Lost Promotion Playoffs |
|---|---|---|---|---|
| 1987 | Norra | Djurgårdens IF | —N/a | —N/a |
| 1987 | Södra | GAIS | —N/a | —N/a |
| 1988 | Norra | Örebro SK | —N/a | —N/a |
| 1988 | Södra | Halmstads BK | —N/a | —N/a |
| 1989 | Norra | Hammarby IF | —N/a | —N/a |
| 1989 | Södra | Östers IF | —N/a | —N/a |
| 1990 | Norra | —N/a | GIF Sundsvall | —N/a |
| 1990 | Södra | —N/a | —N/a | BK Häcken |
| 1991 | Norra | —N/a | —N/a | Kiruna FF |
| 1991 | Östra | —N/a | —N/a | Hammarby IF |
| 1991 | Västra | —N/a | Västra Frölunda IF | —N/a |
| 1991 | Södra | —N/a | Trelleborgs FF | —N/a |
| 1992 | Norra | —N/a | —N/a | IFK Sundsvall |
| 1992 | Östra | —N/a | IK Brage | —N/a |
| 1992 | Västra | —N/a | BK Häcken | —N/a |
| 1992 | Södra | —N/a | Halmstads BK | —N/a |
| 1993 | Norra | Hammarby IF | —N/a | Vasalund IF |
| 1993 | Södra | Landskrona BoIS | —N/a | IFK Hässleholm |
| 1994 | Norra | Djurgårdens IF | —N/a | Umeå FC |
| 1994 | Södra | Örgryte IS | —N/a | Kalmar FF |
| 1995 | Norra | Umeå FC | —N/a | Gefle IF |
| 1995 | Södra | IK Oddevold | —N/a | GAIS |
| 1996 | Norra | Västerås SK | —N/a | Hammarby IF |
| 1996 | Södra | IF Elfsborg | Ljungskile SK | —N/a |
| 1997 | Norra | Hammarby IF | —N/a | Djurgårdens IF |
| 1997 | Södra | Västra Frölunda IF | BK Häcken | —N/a |
| 1998 | Norra | Djurgårdens IF | Umeå FC | —N/a |
| 1998 | Södra | Kalmar FF | —N/a | Landskrona BoIS |
| 1999 | Norra | GIF Sundsvall | —N/a | Assyriska FF |
| 1999 | Södra | BK Häcken | GAIS | —N/a |

=== Third tier ===
| Season | League | Won Promotion | Won Promotion Playoffs | Lost Promotion Playoffs |
|---|---|---|---|---|
| 2006 | Norra | Enköpings SK | IK Sirius | —N/a |
| 2006 | Södra | IF Sylvia | Bunkeflo IF | —N/a |
| 2007 | Norra | Assyriska FF | FC Väsby United | —N/a |
| 2007 | Södra | Qviding FIF | Ängelholms FF | —N/a |
| 2008 | Norra | Syrianska FC | Vasalund IF | —N/a |
| 2008 | Södra | FC Trollhättan | —N/a | Östers IF |
| 2009 | Norra | Degerfors IF | IK Brage | —N/a |
| 2009 | Södra | Östers IF | —N/a | Skövde AIK |
| 2010 | Norra | Västerås SK | —N/a | IK Sirius |
| 2010 | Södra | IFK Värnamo | —N/a | Qviding FIF |
| 2011 | Norra | Umeå FC | —N/a | FC Väsby United |
| 2011 | Södra | Varbergs BoIS | —N/a | IF Sylvia |
| 2012 | Norra | Östersunds FK | —N/a | BK Forward |
| 2012 | Södra | Örgryte IS | —N/a | Lunds BK |
| 2013 | Norra | IK Sirius | —N/a | Dalkurd FF |
| 2013 | Södra | Husqvarna FF | —N/a | IK Oddevold |
| 2014 | Norra | AFC United | IK Frej | —N/a |
| 2014 | Södra | Utsiktens BK | —N/a | Örgryte IS |
| 2015 | Norra | Dalkurd FF | —N/a | Akropolis IF |
| 2015 | Södra | Trelleborgs FF | Örgryte IS | —N/a |
| 2016 | Norra | IF Brommapojkarna | —N/a | Vasalund IF |
| 2016 | Södra | Östers IF | Norrby IF | —N/a |
| 2017 | Norra | IK Brage | —N/a | Akropolis IF |
| 2017 | Södra | Landskrona BoIS | —N/a | Mjällby AIF |
| 2018 | Norra | Västerås SK | Syrianska FC | —N/a |
| 2018 | Södra | Mjällby AIF | —N/a | Oskarshamns AIK |
| 2019 | Norra | Akropolis IF | Umeå FC | —N/a |
| 2019 | Södra | Ljungskile SK | —N/a | Landskrona BoIS |
| 2020 | Norra | Vasalund IF | —N/a | IF Brommapojkarna |
| 2020 | Södra | IFK Värnamo | Landskrona BoIS | —N/a |
| 2021 | Norra | IF Brommapojkarna | Dalkurd FF | —N/a |
| 2021 | Södra | Utsiktens BK | Skövde AIK | —N/a |
| 2022 | Norra | Gefle IF | —N/a | Sandvikens IF |
| 2022 | Södra | GAIS | —N/a | Falkenbergs FF |
| 2023 | Norra | Sandvikens IF | —N/a | Nordic United |
| 2023 | Södra | IK Oddevold | —N/a | Falkenbergs FF |
| 2024 | Norra | Umeå FC | —N/a | Stockholm Internazionale |
| 2024 | Södra | Falkenbergs FF | —N/a | Lunds BK |
| 2025 | Norra | Nordic United FC | —N/a | Hammarby TFF |
| 2025 | Södra | Ljungskile SK | Norrby IF | —N/a |
| 2026 | Norra | Stockholm Internazionale | —N/a | —N/a |
| 2026 | Södra | Trelleborgs FF | —N/a | —N/a |

^{Note: In 2007 the runners up were promoted automatically without playoffs because of Allsvenskan expanding to 16 teams.}

== Statistics ==
=== Top goalscorers Norra ===
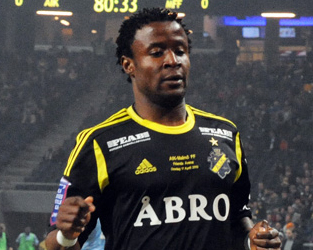
Nigerian forward Kennedy Igboananike became topscorer in Division 1 Norra 2008 with Vasalund IF.

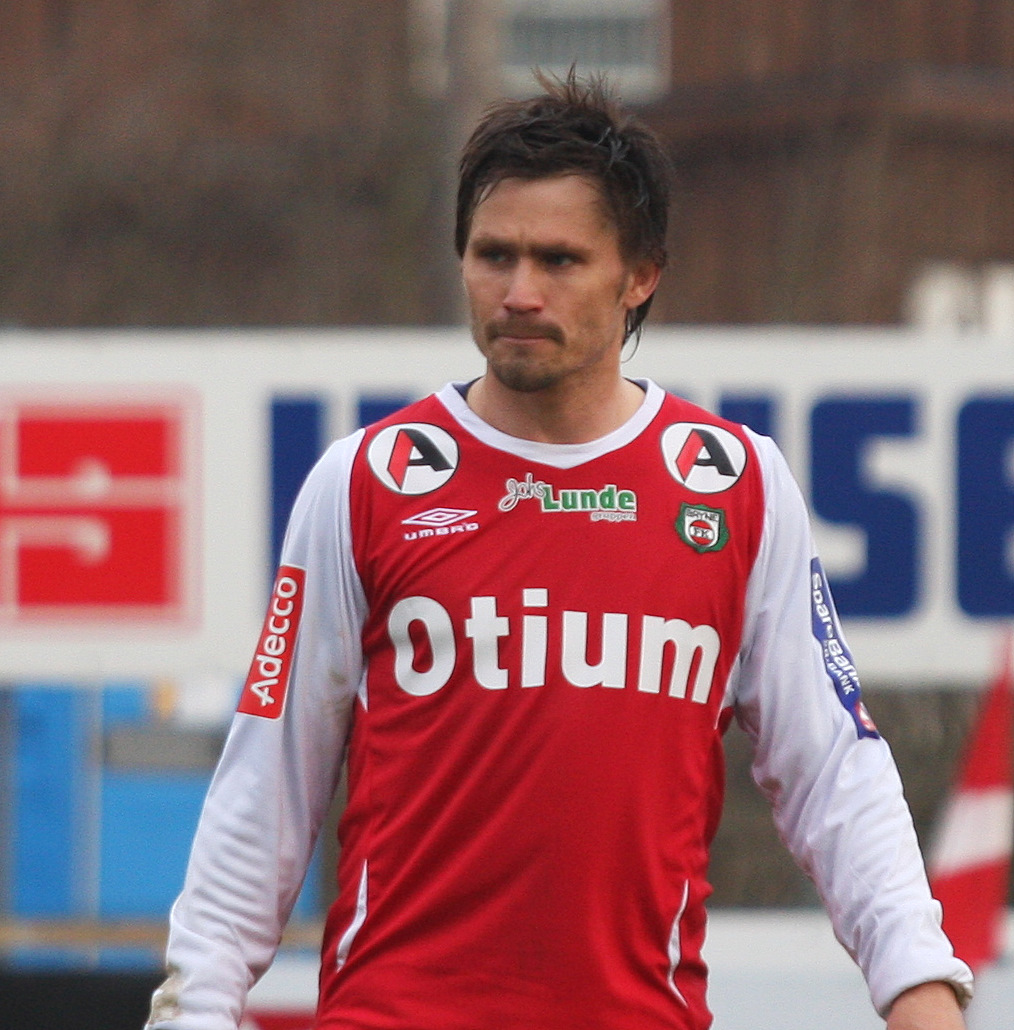
Veteran Danish forward Allan Borgvardt has been one of the most prolific players during the 2011, 2012 and 2013 Division 1 seasons with an overall 48 goals in 68 games.

| Season | Player | Team | Goals |
|---|---|---|---|
| 2006 | (Sweden) Anders Lindberg | Visby IF Gute | 14 |
| 2007 | (Sweden) Andreas Hermansson | Umeå FC | 16 |
| 2008 | (Nigeria) Kennedy Igboananike | Vasalund IF | 18 |
| 2009 | (Sweden) Johan Eklund | IK Brage | 21 |
| 2010 | (Sweden) Danny Persson | Umeå FC | 17 |
| 2011 | (Kenya) Robert Mambo Mumba | Dalkurd FF | 16 |
| 2012 | (Sweden) Emir Smajic | Östersunds FK; Västerås SK | 17 |
| 2013 | (Sweden) Stellan Carlsson | BK Forward | 18 |
| 2013 | (Nigeria) Moses Ogbu | IK Sirius | 18 |
| 2014 | (Sweden) Sencer Soguk | Valsta Syrianska IK | 16 |
| 2015 | (Sweden) Simon Mårtensson | Umeå FC | 17 |
| 2016 | (Italy) Luca Gerbino Polo | Akropolis IF | 25 |
| 2017 | (Sweden) Timothy McNeil | Team TG | 17 |
| 2017 | (Sweden) Karwan Safari | Västerås SK | 17 |
| 2018 | (Sweden) Nikola Vasic | Akropolis IF | 21 |
| 2019 | (Sweden) Ekin Bulut | Vasalund IF | 26 |
| 2020 | (England) Ashley Coffey | IFK Haninge | 28 |
| 2021 | (Sweden) Pashang Abdulla | Piteå IF | 20 |
| 2021 | (Sweden) Rodin Deprem | Örebro Syrianska IF; IF Brommapojkarna | 20 |
| 2022 | (Ghana) Naeem Mohammed | Sandvikens IF | 23 |
| 2023 | (Syria) Shergo Shhab | Nordic United FC | 24 |
| 2024 | (Guinea) Kerfala Cissoko | Umeå FC | 19 |
| 2025 | (Poland) Kamil Dawid Dudziak | Karlbergs BK | 19 |
| 2025 | (Sweden) Linus Zetterström | Enköping SK | 19 |

=== Top goalscorers Södra ===
| Season | Player | Team | Goals |
|---|---|---|---|
| 2006 | (Bosnia and Herzegovina) Vedad Aganovic | Norrby IF | 12 |
| 2007 | (Sweden) Freddy Söderberg | IFK Värnamo | 23 |
| 2008 | (Sweden) Niklas Moberg | Carlstad United BK | 21 |
| 2009 | (Sweden) Jörgen Nilsson | Kristianstads FF | 17 |
| 2010 | (Sweden) Ken Hansson | FC Rosengård | 23 |
| 2011 | (Denmark) Allan Borgvardt | IF Sylvia | 19 |
| 2012 | (Sweden) Johan Patriksson | IK Oddevold | 24 |
| 2013 | (Denmark) Allan Borgvardt | IF Sylvia | 15 |
| 2014 | (Sweden) Salif Camara Jönsson | Lunds BK | 27 |
| 2015 | (Sweden) Salif Camara Jönsson | Trelleborgs FF | 23 |
| 2016 | (Sweden) Richard Yarsuvat | Norrby IF | 20 |
| 2017 | (Sweden) Robin Strömberg | Ljungskile SK | 21 |
| 2018 | (Sweden) Robin Strömberg | Ljungskile SK | 20 |
| 2019 | (Nigeria) Aniekpeno Udo | Ljungskile SK | 18 |
| 2019 | (Sweden) Jesper Westermark | Ljungskile SK | 18 |
| 2020 | (Sweden) Simon Adjei | Assyriska IK | 25 |
| 2021 | (France) Yoann Fellrath | FC Trollhättan | 26 |
| 2022 | (Sweden) Noah Christoffersson | Torns IF | 21 |
| 2023 | (Sweden) Alibek Aliev | FC Trollhättan | 26 |
| 2024 | (Sweden) Ahmed Awad | Ariana FC | 17 |
| 2024 | (Sweden) Victor Andersson | Onsala BK | 17 |
| 2025 | (Sweden) Vilmer Tyrén | Ljungskile SK | 20 |
