= Kiruna FF =

Swedish football club

- Full name: Kiruna Fotbollförening
- Founded: 21 December 1970
- Ground: Lombia IP; Kiruna, Sweden
- Capacity: 3,000
- Chairman: Tommy Stridsman
- Manager: Giuseppe Cristaldi
- League: Division 2 Norra Norrland
- Website: http://www.kirunaff.nu/
Home colours

Kiruna FF is a Swedish football club located in Kiruna. The men's team competes in Division 2 Norra Norrland, in the Swedish football league system. The women's team competes in the fifth level.

== Background ==
Kiruna FF/BoIS was formed on 21 December 1970, when Kiruna AIF, IFK Kiruna, Kebne IK and Kiruna BK merged into one club. Since 2009 the club has been called Kiruna FF. The Men's team plays in Division 3 Norra Norrland and the Ladies team in Division 1. Kiruna FF is Sweden's northernmost football club.

The 1991 season was the most successful in the history of the club when Kiruna FF progressed from the Division 1 Norra (Spring competition) to compete in the Division 1 Kvalsvenskan (Autumn competition) which was the highest level of second tier Swedish football. In contrast since 2009 the club have been playing in the fifth tier in Division 3 Norra Norrland following their relegation from Division 2 Norrland in 2008.

The club has trained a number of committed and well-trained youth leaders over the years. A key objective is to foster long-term prospective first-team players in accordance with the club's Corporate Plan. Two players from KFF that now compete in the Allsvenskan and Damallsvenskan are Jonas Lantto (Gefle IF) and Selina Henriksson (Umeå IK).

The club won the Midnattsolscupen (Midnight Sun Cup) in 1985, 1996, 1997, 2002, 2005 and 2008.

The club is affiliated to Norrbottens Fotbollförbund.

== Season to season ==
Season	Level	Division	Section	Position	Movements
1985	Tier 4	Division 3	Norra Norrland	5th	
1986	Tier 4	Division 3	Norra Norrland	4th	Promoted
1987	Tier 3	Division 2	Norra	5th	
1988	Tier 3	Division 2	Norra	1st	Promoted
1989	Tier 2	Division 1	Norra	3rd	
1990	Tier 2	Division 1	Norra	6th	
1991	Tier 2	Division 1	Norra	1st	Spring
	Tier 2	Division 1	Kvalsvenskan	8th	Autumn
1992	Tier 2	Division 1	Norra	7th	Spring
	Tier 2	Division 1	Norra	8th	Autumn – Relegated
1993	Tier 3	Division 2	Norrland	1st	Promoted
1994	Tier 2	Division 1	Norra	13th	Relegated
1995	Tier 3	Division 2	Norrland	9th	
1996	Tier 3	Division 2	Norrland	8th	
1997	Tier 3	Division 2	Norrland	6th	
1998	Tier 3	Division 2	Norrland	7th	
1999	Tier 3	Division 2	Norrland	3rd	
2000	Tier 3	Division 2	Norrland	8th	
2001	Tier 3	Division 2	Norrland	10th	Relegation play-offs
2002	Tier 3	Division 2	Norrland	10th	Relegation play-offs
2003	Tier 3	Division 2	Norrland	10th	Relegation play-offs
2004	Tier 3	Division 2	Norrland	7th	
2005	Tier 3	Division 2	Norrland	4th	Promoted
2006*	Tier 3	Division 1	Norra	14th	Relegated
2007	Tier 4	Division 2	Norrland	10th	Relegation play-offs
2008	Tier 4	Division 2	Norrland	12th	Relegated
2009	Tier 5	Division 3	Norra Norrland	8th	
2010	Tier 5	Division 3	Norra Norrland	3rd	
2011	Tier 5	Division 3	Norra Norrland	2nd	Promotion play-offs
2012	Tier 5	Division 3	Norra Norrland	3rd	
2013	Tier 5	Division 3	Norra Norrland	6th	
2014	Tier 5	Division 3	Norra Norrland	3rd	
2015	Tier 5	Division 3	Norra Norrland	4th	
2016	Tier 5	Division 3	Norra Norrland	6th	
2017	Tier 5	Division 3	Norra Norrland	4th	
2018	Tier 5	Division 3	Norra Norrland	9th	Relegation play-offs
2019	Tier 5	Division 3	Norra Norrland	4th	

* League restructuring in 2006 resulted in a new division being created at tier 3 and subsequent divisions dropping a level.

== Attendances ==
In recent seasons Kiruna FF have had the following average attendances:

Season	Average attendance	Division/section	Level
2002	199	Div 2 Norrland	Tier 3
2003	204	Div 2 Norrland	Tier 3
2004	292	Div 2 Norrland	Tier 3
2005	394	Div 2 Norrland	Tier 3
2006	232	Div 1 Norra	Tier 3
2007	197	Div 2 Norrland	Tier 4
2008	140	Div 2 Norrland	Tier 4
2009	147	Div 3 Norra Norrland	Tier 5
2010	188	Div 3 Norra Norrland	Tier 5
2011	249	Div 3 Norra Norrland	Tier 5
2012	152	Div 3 Norra Norrland	Tier 5
2013	102	Div 3 Norra Norrland	Tier 5
2014	127	Div 3 Norra Norrland	Tier 5

* Attendances are provided in the Publikliga sections of the Svenska Fotbollförbundet website.

== Current squad ==
As of 27 April 2010. Note: Flags indicate national team as defined under FIFA eligibility rules; some limited exceptions apply. Players may hold more than one non-FIFA nationality.

No.	Pos.	Nation	Player
—	GK	SWE	Petter Kero
—	GK	SWE	Emil Siljegren
—	DF	SWE	Henrik Johansson
—	DF	SWE	Johan K-S
—	DF	SWE	Emil Lund
—	DF	SWE	Jonas Lasu
—	DF	SWE	Simon Mörtberg
—	DF	SWE	Jacob Johansson
—	DF	SWE	Nils-Johan Labba
—	DF	SWE	Hans Laaksonen
—	DF	SWE	Johan Pettersson
—	MF	SWE	Pär-Jon Huuva
—	MF	SWE	Per-Anders Pokka
—	MF	SWE	Robert Unga

No.	Pos.	Nation	Player
—	MF	SWE	Mac Chahrour
—	MF	SWE	Fredrik Lindberg
—	MF	SWE	Jon Sarri
—	MF	SWE	Jonas Kuorak
—	MF	SWE	Joon Karlsson
—	FW	SWE	Anders Mannela
—	FW	SWE	Don Lönnelid
—	FW	SWE	Fredrik Ahlander
—	FW	SWE	Filip Daunfelt
—	FW	SWE	Emil Björnström
—	FW	SWE	Eddy Ngyen
—	FW	SWE	Adrian Andersson
—	FW	BRA	Diego Pereira Valviesse

== Achievements ==
=== League ===
- Division 1 Norra:
  - Winners (1): 1991

=== Cups ===
- Midnattsolscupen:
  - Winners (6): 1985, 1996, 1997, 2002, 2005, 2008

=== European participations ===
Season	Competition	Round		Club	Score
1992	Intertoto Cup	GR	(Czechoslovakia)	ŠK Slovan Bratislava	2–3, 2–5
		GR	(Hungary)	Váci Izzó MTE	0–2, 2–5
		GR	(Denmark)	Aarhus GF	1–1, 1–1
