= FK Karlskrona =

Swedish football club

- Full name: Fotbollsklubben Karlskrona
- Founded: 1968; 57 years ago (as Karlskrona AIF); 2012; 13 years ago
- Ground: Västra Mark IP; Karlskrona; Sweden
- Capacity: 4,000
- Head coach: Petter Abrahamsson
- League: Division 1 Södra
- 2019: Division 2 Östra Götaland, 1st ▲
Home colours

FK Karlskrona is a Swedish football club located in Karlskrona.

== Background ==
The club was formed on 31 October 2012, as a result of the merger of Lyckeby GoIF and Karlskrona AIF. Karlskrona AIF was formed in 1968 as a result of the merger of Saltö BK, Karlskrona BK and Björkholmens IF.

Since its founding Karlskrona has participated mainly in the middle lower divisions of the Swedish football league system. They did play second-tier football in Division 2 Södra and Division 1 Södra in the 1980s and early 1990s. The club currently plays in Division 1 Södra which is the third tier of Swedish football. They play their home matches at the Västra Mark IP in Karlskrona. Their attendance record is the 3,893 spectators against Västra Frolunda IF in 1981.

On 31 October 2012, the club merged with Lyckeby GoIF and changed its name to FK Karlskrona. After winning Division 2 Södra Götaland in 2016 the club was promoted to Division 1.

FK Karlskrona is affiliated to the Blekinge Fotbollförbund.

== Season to season ==
Season	Level	Division	Section	Position	Movements
1993	Tier 3	Division 2	Södra Götaland	1st	Promoted
1994	Tier 2	Division 1	Södra	12th	Relegated
1995	Tier 3	Division 2	Södra Götaland	7th	
1996	Tier 3	Division 2	Södra Götaland	12th	Relegated
1997	Tier 4	Division 3	Sydöstra Götaland	5th	
1998	Tier 4	Division 3	Sydöstra Götaland	5th	
1999	Tier 4	Division 3	Sydöstra Götaland	1st	Promoted
2000	Tier 3	Division 2	Södra Götaland	11th	Relegated
2001	Tier 4	Division 3	Sydöstra Götaland	1st	Promoted
2002	Tier 3	Division 2	Södra Götaland	5th	
2003	Tier 3	Division 2	Södra Götaland	10th	Relegation Playoffs
2004	Tier 3	Division 2	Södra Götaland	12th	Relegated
2005	Tier 4	Division 3	Sydöstra Götaland	2nd	Promoted
2006*	Tier 4	Division 2	Södra Götaland	5th	
2007	Tier 4	Division 2	Södra Götaland	5th	
2008	Tier 4	Division 2	Södra Götaland	4th	
2009	Tier 4	Division 2	Södra Götaland	5th	
2010	Tier 4	Division 2	Östra Götaland	3rd	
2011	Tier 4	Division 2	Södra Götaland	5th	
2012	Tier 4	Division 2	Östra Götaland	5th	
2013	Tier 4	Division 2	Södra Götaland	11th	Relegation Playoffs
2014	Tier 4	Division 2	Östra Götaland	3rd	
2015	Tier 4	Division 2	Södra Götaland	2nd	
2016	Tier 4	Division 2	Södra Götaland	1st	Promoted

* League restructuring in 2006 resulted in a new division being created at Tier 3 and subsequent divisions dropping a level.
