= Väsby IK FK =

Swedish football club

- Full name: Väsby Idrottsklubb Fotbollsklubb
- Founded: 1924
- Dissolved: 2018
- Ground: Vilundavallen; Upplands Väsby; Sweden
- Chairman: Almir Puric
- Head coach: Thomas Bangstad
- League: Division 7 Stockholm A
Home colours	Away colours

Väsby IK FK was a Swedish football club located in based in the Stockholm suburb of Upplands Väsby. It was the football section of sports club Väsby IK.

== Background ==
Väsby IK Fotboll was founded in 1924.

From 1996 To 2004 Väsby IK FK played in Division 2 Östra Svealand which is the third tier of Swedish football. They played their home matches at the Vilundavallen in Upplands Väsby.

The clubs association football department merged with FC Café Opera United in 2005 to form Väsby United, which later became AFC Eskilstuna. In 2013, after AFC United relocated to Solna, Väsby IK FK once again formed their own football department.

The club was affiliated to Stockholms Fotbollförbund. In 2018 they were declared bankrupt and dissolved. Parsian IF relocated to Upplands Väsby and renamed themselves Parsian Väsby IF and they now play on Vilundavallen.

== Season to season ==
Season	Level	League	Pos
1987	Tier 3	Division 2 Mellersta	1st (Promoted)
1988	Tier 2	Division 1 Norra	12th
1989	Tier 2	Division 1 Norra	11th
1990	Tier 2	Division 1 Norra	11th
1991	Tier 2	Division 1 Östra	11th
1992	Tier 2	Division 2 Höstserier Kvalettan Norra	4th (Relegated)
1993	Tier 3	Division 2 Östra Svealand	2nd (Promotion Playoffs)
1994	Tier 3	Division 2 Östra Svealand	1st (Promoted)
1995	Tier 2	Division 1 Norra	13th (Relegated)
1996	Tier 3	Division 2 Östra Svealand	5th
1997	Tier 3	Division 2 Västra Svealand	6th
1998	Tier 3	Division 2 Östra Svealand	2nd (Promotion Playoffs)
1999	Tier 3	Division 2 Östra Svealand	1st (Promotion Playoffs)
2000	Tier 3	Division 2 Västra Svealand	7th
2001	Tier 3	Division 2 Östra Svealand	3rd
2002	Tier 3	Division 2 Östra Svealand	1st (Promotion Playoffs)
2003	Tier 3	Division 2 Östra Svealand	1st (Promotion Playoffs)
2004	Tier 3	Division 2 Östra Svealand	1st (Promotion Playoffs – Promoted)
