= Markaryds IF =

Swedish football club

- Full name: Markaryds Idrottsförening
- Nickname: MIF
- Founded: 1924
- Ground: Skärsjövallen; Markaryd; Sweden
- Chairman: Magnus Nilsson
- Head coach: Daniel Nilsson
- Coach: Christian Karlsson
- League: Division 3 Sydvästra Götaland
- 2010: Division 3 Sydvästra Götaland, 7th
Home colours	Away colours

Markaryds IF is a Swedish football club located in Markaryd in Kronoberg County.

== Background ==
Markaryds Idrottsförening were founded in 1924. MIF is a small club with a "village character". They currently have an active youth section with approximately 150–175 players. Membership within the club is growing steadily.

Since their foundation Markaryds IF has participated mainly in the middle divisions of the Swedish football league system. The club currently plays in Division 3 Sydvästra Götaland which is the fifth tier of Swedish football. Their best years were from 1988 to 1991 when MIF spent four seasons in Division 1 Södra, which was then the second tier of Swedish football. They play their home matches at the Skärsjövallen in Markaryd.

Markaryds IF are affiliated to Smålands Fotbollförbund.

== Recent history ==
In recent seasons Markaryds IF have competed in the following divisions:

2011 – Division III, Sydvästra Götaland
2010 – Division III, Sydvästra Götaland
2009 – Division III, Södra Götaland
2008 – Division II, Södra Götaland
2007 – Division III, Sydvästra Götaland
2006 – Division III, Sydvästra Götaland
2005 – Division III, Sydvästra Götaland
2004 – Division III, Sydvästra Götaland
2003 – Division IV, Småland Västra Elit
2002 – Division III, Sydvästra Götaland
2001 – Division III, Sydvästra Götaland
2000 – Division IV, Småland Sydvästra
1999 – Division IV, Småland Sydvästra
1998 – Division III, Sydvästra Götaland
1997 – Division III, Sydvästra Götaland
1996 – Division III, Sydöstra Götaland
1995 – Division II, Södra Götaland
1994 – Division II, Södra Götaland
1993 – Division II, Södra Götaland

== Attendances ==
In recent seasons Markaryds IF have had the following average attendances:

Season	Average Attendance	Division / Section	Level
2005	261	Div 3 Sydvästra Götaland	Tier 4
2006	162	Div 3 Sydvästra Götaland	Tier 5
2007	348	Div 3 Sydvästra Götaland	Tier 5
2008	270	Div 2 Södra Götaland	Tier 4
2009	187	Div 3 Sydvästra Götaland	Tier 5
2010	198	Div 3 Sydvästra Götaland	Tier 5

* Attendances are provided in the Publikliga sections of the Svenska Fotbollförbundet website.

The club attendance record was set in 1985 when 3,006 spectators attended Skärsjövallen for the match with Halmstad BK.

More recently 1,550 people attended the derby match with Hinneryds IF in 2007 which MIF won to secure the Div 3 Sydvästra Götaland league title.
