= Myresjö/Vetlanda FK =

Swedish football club

- Full name: Myresjö/Vetlanda Fotbollsklubb
- Founded: 1943 as Myresjö IF; 2013 as Myresjö/Vetlanda FK
- Ground: Myrvalla, Myresjö
- Chairman: Tommy Halldin
- Head coach: Martin Nilsson
- League: Division 3 Nordöstra Götaland
- 2014: Division 3 Nordöstra Götaland, 2nd
Home colours	Away colours

Myresjö/Vetlanda FK is a Swedish football club located in Myresjö in Vetlanda Municipality, Jönköping County.

== Background ==
Myresjö Idrottsförening were founded in 1943 with the founding members seeking club participation in the sports of orienteering, running, skiing, athletics, football and bandy. However, only football and skiing have had a longer life. Ice hockey and table tennis were introduced in the 1950s but both ended in the late 60s.

Over the last 50 years Myresjö IF has participated mainly in the upper and middle divisions of the Swedish football league system. In their early days Myresjö IF's football team resided in the lower divisions. In 1959 the team were in Division 7 and began to progress up the league. In 1968 they won Division 4 and took the step up to Division 3. 1977 the team won its Division 3 section in superior style, but missed out on promotion by losing in the Division 2 qualification playoffs. However, in 1981 they were successful in progressing to Division 2 Södra, which was at that time the second tier of the Swedish football. The club played at this level for 12 of the next 16 seasons, their best season being in 1987 when they finished 4th in Division 1 Södra.

Since their foundation Myresjö IF has participated mainly in the upper and middle divisions of the Swedish football league system. The club currently plays in Division 3 Nordöstra Götaland which is the fifth tier of Swedish football. They play their home matches at the Myrvalla in Myresjö.

Their home ground was inaugurated in 1962 with a gravel training pitch added in 1967 and a grass training pitch in 1977. In 1978 the name Myrvalla was adopted. The clubhouse was completed in Spring 1982 in time for the club's premiere in Division 2 Södra. The main stand was opened on 28 July 1987 in a match against Örgryte IS.

Many leading Swedish clubs played at Myrvalla over the years in league or cup matches. These include Halmstad BK, Malmö FF, Helsingborgs IF, IF Elfsborg and Kalmar FF to name a few. In the 1980s British teams – Queens Park Rangers F.C., Rangers and Nottingham Forest – played friendlies at Myrvalla.

In early 2013, Myresjö IF merged with Vetlanda FF and Bäckseda IF to create the club Myresjö/Vetlanda FK. Myresjö/Vetlanda FK are affiliated to Smålands Fotbollförbund. The club's best season in the Svenska Cupen was in 1991 when they reached the semi-final.

== Season to season ==
Season	Level	Division	Section	Position	Movements
1964	Tier 4	Division 4	Småland Nordöstra	8th	
1965	Tier 4	Division 4	Småland Nordvästra	6th	
1966	Tier 4	Division 4	Småland Nordöstra	2nd	
1967	Tier 4	Division 4	Småland Nordöstra	3rd	
1968	Tier 4	Division 4	Småland Sydöstra	1st	Promoted
1969	Tier 3	Division 3	Mellersta Götaland	2nd	
1970	Tier 3	Division 3	Sydöstra Götaland	3rd	
1971	Tier 3	Division 3	Mellersta Götaland	4th	
1972	Tier 3	Division 3	Mellersta Götaland	7th	
1973	Tier 3	Division 3	Mellersta Götaland	6th	
1974	Tier 3	Division 3	Mellersta Götaland	9th	
1975	Tier 3	Division 3	Mellersta Götaland	3rd	
1976	Tier 3	Division 3	Mellersta Götaland	2nd	
1977	Tier 3	Division 3	Mellersta Götaland	1st	Promotion Playoffs
1978	Tier 3	Division 3	Nordöstra Götaland	7th	
1979	Tier 3	Division 3	Nordöstra Götaland	3rd	
1980	Tier 3	Division 3	Nordöstra Götaland	3rd	
1981	Tier 3	Division 3	Nordöstra Götaland	1st	Promoted
1982	Tier 2	Division 2	Södra	10th	
1983	Tier 2	Division 2	Södra	8th	
1984	Tier 2	Division 2	Södra	11th	
1985	Tier 2	Division 2	Södra	11th	
1986	Tier 2	Division 2	Södra	10th	
1987	Tier 2	Division 1	Södra	4th	
1988	Tier 2	Division 1	Södra	13th	Relegated
1989	Tier 3	Division 2	Södra	6th	
1990	Tier 3	Division 2	Södra	1st	Promoted
1991	Tier 2	Division 1	Södra	6th	Vårserier (Spring Series)
1991	Tier 2	Division 1	Höstettan Västra	3rd	Höstserier (Autumn Series)
1992	Tier 2	Division 1	Västra	6th	Vårserier (Spring Series)
1992	Tier 2	Division 1	Höstettan Södra	5th	Höstserier (Autumn Series)
1993	Tier 2	Division 1	Södra	11th	Relegation Playoffs – Relegated
1994	Tier 3	Division 2	Östra Götaland	1st	Promoted
1995	Tier 2	Division 1	Södra	12th	Relegated
1996	Tier 3	Division 2	Östra Götaland	1st	Promoted
1997	Tier 2	Division 1	Södra	12th	Relegated
1998	Tier 3	Division 2	Östra Götaland	2nd	Promotion Playoffs
1999	Tier 3	Division 2	Östra Götaland	7th	
2000	Tier 3	Division 2	Östra Götaland	2nd	
2001	Tier 3	Division 2	Östra Götaland	9th	
2002	Tier 3	Division 2	Östra Götaland	6th	
2003	Tier 3	Division 2	Östra Götaland	4th	
2004	Tier 3	Division 2	Östra Götaland	5th	
2005	Tier 3	Division 2	Mellersta Götaland	5th	Playoffs
2006*	Tier 3	Division 1	Södra	12th	Relegated
2007	Tier 4	Division 2	Mellersta Götaland	3rd	
2008	Tier 4	Division 2	Östra Götaland	2nd	
2009	Tier 4	Division 2	Mellersta Götaland	10th	Relegation Playoffs – Relegated
2010	Tier 5	Division 3	Nordöstra Götaland	4th	
2011	Tier 5	Division 3	Nordöstra Götaland	2nd	Promotion Playoffs – Promoted
2012	Tier 4	Division 2	Östra Götaland	12th	Relegated
2013	Tier 5	Division 3	Sydöstra Götaland	3rd	As Myresjö/Vetlanda FK
2014	Tier 5	Division 3	Nordöstra Götaland	2nd	

* League restructuring in 2006 resulted in a new division being created at Tier 3 and subsequent divisions dropping a level.

== Attendances ==
In recent seasons Myresjö IF have had the following average attendances:

Season	Average attendance	Division / Section	Level
2001	283	Div 2 Östra Götaland	Tier 3
2002	266	Div 2 Östra Götaland	Tier 3
2003	244	Div 2 Östra Götaland	Tier 3
2004	302	Div 2 Östra Götaland	Tier 3
2005	304	Div 2 Mellersta Götaland	Tier 3
2006	241	Div 1 Södra	Tier 3
2007	239	Div 2 Mellersta Götaland	Tier 4
2008	190	Div 2 Östra Götaland	Tier 4
2009	225	Div 2 Mellersta Götaland	Tier 4
2010	151	Div 3 Nordöstra Götaland	Tier 5
2011	197	Div 3 Nordöstra Götaland	Tier 5

* Attendances are provided in the Publikliga sections of the Svenska Fotbollförbundet website and European Football Statistics website.

The attendance record for Myresjö IF was set in 1988 when 3,099 spectators attended the match against Halmstad BK.
