= Daniel Tjernström =

Swedish footballer

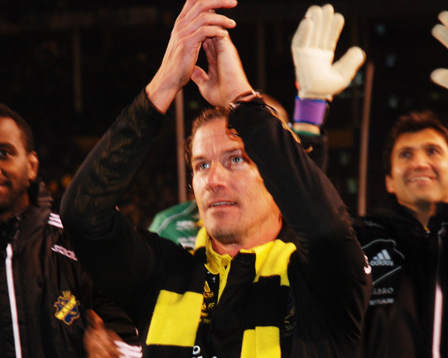
- Daniel Tjernström following the AIK–Malmö FF Allsvenskan game in November 2012

Personal information
- Full name: Leif Daniel Tjernström
- Date of birth: 19 February 1974 (age 52)
- Place of birth: Karlskoga, Sweden
- Height: 1.81 m (5 ft 11 in)
- Positions: Midfielder; left winger

Youth career
- 1981–1987: Bråten
- 1988–1989: KB Karlskoga

Senior career*
Years	Team	Apps	(Gls)
1990–1992	KB Karlskoga	50	(3)
1993–1995	Degerfors	63	(2)
1996–1998	Örebro SK	71	(13)
1999–2013	AIK	305	(16)
Total		489	(34)

International career
1994–1995	Sweden U21	6	(0)
1997	Sweden B	1	(0)
1997–1999	Sweden	5	(0)
- * Club domestic league appearances and goals

Leif Daniel Tjernström (born 19 February 1974) is a Swedish former professional footballer who played as a midfielder. He is best remembered for his time with AIK which he represented between 1999 and 2013 and played 395 games for. A full international between 1997 and 1999, he won five caps for the Sweden national team.

== Club career ==
=== Early career ===
Tjernström started his footballing career at Bråtens IK before spending three seasons in Division 2 Västra with KB Karlskoga. In 1993 he signed for Degerfors IF, spending three Alssvenskan seasons with the club and winning the 1992–93 Svenska Cupen. In 1996, he was signed by Örebro SK and represented them for three seasons.

=== AIK ===
He signed with AIK in 1999, and played in the group stage of the 1999–2000 UEFA Champions League against FC Barcelona, Arsenal FC, and Fiorentina. He helped the team win the 1998–1999 Svenska Cupen, and served as the team captain when AIK won the 2009 Allsvenskan and 2009 Svenska Cupen. He scored the game-winning goal against IFK Göteborg in November 2009 when AIK secured their first Allsvenskan title in nine years. He made his last appearance for AIK during the 2013 Allsvenskan season in a 2–1 win against Elfsborg, which was his 395th competitive game for the club.

== International career ==
Tjernström represented the Sweden U21 team six times before making his full international debut for the Sweden national team on 9 February 1997 in a friendly game against Romania when he replaced Marino Rahmberg in the 76h minute in a 2–0 win. He made his fifth and final appearance for Sweden on 27 November 1999 in a friendly game against South Africa, playing for 59 minutes before being replaced by Tobias Linderoth in a 1–0 loss. He also represented the Sweden B team once in 1997.

== Career statistics ==
=== Club ===
Club	Season	League			Cup		Europe		Total	
Club	Season	Division	Apps	Goals	Apps	Goals	Apps	Goals	Apps	Goals
KB Karlskoga	1990	Division 2 Västra	1	0			–		1	0
KB Karlskoga	1991	Division 2 Västra	22	0			–		22	0
KB Karlskoga	1992	Division 2 Västra	27	3			–		27	3
KB Karlskoga	Club total		50	3			–		50	3
Degerfors IF	1993	Allsvenskan	16	0			–		16	0
Degerfors IF	1994	Allsvenskan	26	0			–		26	0
Degerfors IF	1995	Allsvenskan	21	0			–		21	0
Degerfors IF	Club total		63	0			–		63	0
Örebro SK	1996	Allsvenskan	23	5			–		23	5
Örebro SK	1997	Allsvenskan	22	3			–		22	3
Örebro SK	1998	Allsvenskan	26	5			–		26	5
Örebro SK	Club total		71	13			–		71	13
AIK	1999	Allsvenskan	25	4			2	1	27	5
AIK	2000	Allsvenskan	25	2			0	0	25	2
AIK	2001	Allsvenskan	18	1			0	0	18	1
AIK	2002	Allsvenskan	23	0			4	0	27	0
AIK	2003	Allsvenskan	21	0			3	0	24	0
AIK	2004	Allsvenskan	12	0			0	0	12	0
AIK	2005	Superettan	29	5			0	0	29	5
AIK	2006	Allsvenskan	26	3	5	0	0	0	31	3
AIK	2007	Allsvenskan	23	0	0	0	5	0	28	0
AIK	2008	Allsvenskan	26	0	0	0	0	0	26	0
AIK	2009	Allsvenskan	26	1	1	0	0	0	27	0
AIK	2010	Allsvenskan	20	0	3	0	6	0	20	0
AIK	2011	Allsvenskan	19	0	0	0	0	0	19	0
AIK	2012	Allsvenskan	11	0	1	0	4	0	16	0
AIK	2013	Allsvenskan	1	0	0	0	0	0	1	0
AIK	Club total		305	16	10	0	24	1	339	17
Career total			488	32	10	0	24	1	522	33

=== International ===
Appearances and goals by national team and year
National team	Year	Apps	Goals
Sweden U21	1994	4	0
Sweden U21	1995	1	0
Sweden U21	Total	5	0
Sweden B	1997	1	0
Sweden	1997	3	0
Sweden	1998	1	0
Sweden	1999	1	0
Sweden	Total	5	0
Career total		11	0

== Honours ==
Degerfors

- Svenska Cupen: 1992–93

AIK

- Allsvenskan: 2009
- Svenska Cupen: 1998–99, 2009
- Supercupen: 2010
