= Pontus Kåmark =

Swedish footballer

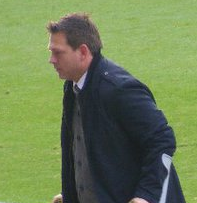
- Kåmark in 2010

Personal information
- Full name: Sven Pontus Kåmark
- Date of birth: 5 April 1969 (age 57)
- Place of birth: Västerås, Sweden
- Height: 1.77 m (5 ft 10 in)
- Position: Defender

Youth career
- 1975–1976: IK Franke
- 1977–1984: Västerås SK

Senior career*
Years	Team	Apps	(Gls)
1985–1988	Västerås SK	55	(6)
1989–1995	IFK Göteborg	144	(4)
1995–1999	Leicester City	65	(0)
1999–2000	AIK	11	(0)
2001–2002	IFK Göteborg	24	(0)
Total		299	(10)

International career
1984–1985	Sweden U17	17	(1)
1985–1986	Sweden U19	5	(1)
1988–1990	Sweden U21	13	(0)
1990–2002	Sweden	57	(0)
Medal record
Sweden
FIFA World Cup
Bronze medal – third place	1994
- * Club domestic league appearances and goals

Sven Pontus Kåmark (Swedish pronunciation: [ˈpɔnˌtʉs ˈkoːˌmark]; born 5 April 1969) is a Swedish former professional footballer who played as a defender. He played for Västerås SK, IFK Göteborg, Leicester City and AIK, and won 57 caps for the Sweden national team. He was part of the Swedish team that finished third at the 1994 FIFA World Cup.

== Club career ==
Kåmark started off his career with IK Franke before making his senior debut for Västerås SK.

=== IFK Göteborg ===
Kåmark signed with IFK Göteborg ahead of the 1989 season and made his debut on 11 May 1989 in a league game against GAIS that ended 2–2. In 1990, Kåmark won his first league title with Göteborg, appearing in 8 league games. The following season, he appeared in 16 league games and 6 cup games when Göteborg won both the Allsvenskan and the Svenska Cupen. Between 1993 and 1995, Kåmark played in more than 60 league games as IFK Göteborg won three straight Allsvenskan titles.

In the 1994–95 UEFA Champions League, Kåmark scored the last goal in a 3–1 win against Manchester United as IFK Göteborg won Group A ahead of FC Barcelona, Manchester United and Galatasaray. Kåmark played in all 180 minutes as the captain when IFK Göteborg was eliminated by FC Bayern Munich on away goals in the quarter-finals.

=== Leicester City ===
Kåmark was bought by Leicester City from Göteborg for £840,000 in September 1995, but did not join the team until IFK Göteborg had lifted the 1995 Allsvenskan trophy. Only three days after making his debut for the club, Kåmark tore his ACL in a League Cup game against Bolton Wanderers, which ruled him out of football for a year. Kåmark eventually recovered from his injury and made his comeback in January 1997, eventually helping his team win the 1996–97 Football League Cup, playing in all 120 minutes in the final.

=== AIK ===
Kåmark signed for the 1998 Allsvenskan champions AIK in the summer of 1999, ahead of their 1999–2000 UEFA Champions League campaign. AIK was able to keep a clean sheet in all 12 of Kåmark's first games for the club. He eventually helped the team qualify for the Champions League group stage by playing at left back when AIK eliminated AEK Athens in the qualifying stage. AIK finished last in Group B, competing with Barcelona, Arsenal and Fiorentina. He tore his ACL once again during the 2000 spring season and left AIK at the end of the season.

=== Return to IFK Göteborg and retirement ===
After recovering from his third ACL injury, Kåmark return to IFK Göteborg for the 2001 Allsvenskan season. He retired from professional football in 2002.

== International career ==
=== Youth ===
Kåmark won a total of 35 caps for the Sweden U17, U19, and U21 teams and represented his country at the 1990 UEFA European Under-21 Championship where Sweden reached the semifinals.

=== Senior ===
He made his senior debut for Sweden in a friendly against the United Arab Emirates on 14 February 1990.

Kåmark played in three games as Sweden qualified for the 1994 FIFA World Cup. At the final tournament, Kåmark appeared in four games as Sweden finished third behind Brazil and Italy. He appeared in five games as Sweden failed to qualify for Euro 1996, and in four games as Sweden missed out on qualifying for the 1998 FIFA World Cup. He helped Sweden qualify for both Euro 2000 and the 2002 FIFA World Cup, but missed both final tournaments because of injuries.

He made his last international appearance in a friendly against Greece on 13 February 2002. Kåmark ultimately won 57 caps for Sweden without scoring.

== Career statistics ==
=== Club ===
Appearances and goals by club, season and competition
Club	Season	League			National cup		EFL Cup		Europe		Other (Note: Includes Mästerskapsserien.)		Total	
Club	Season	Division	Apps	Goals	Apps	Goals	Apps	Goals	Apps	Goals	Apps	Goals	Apps	Goals
Västerås SK	1985	Division 2 Norra					—		—		—			
Västerås SK	1986	Division 2 Norra					—		—		—			
Västerås SK	1987	Division 1 Norra					—		—		—			
Västerås SK	1988	Division 1 Norra					—		—		—			
Västerås SK	Total		55	6			—		—		—		55	6
IFK Göteborg	1989	Allsvenskan	18	3	3	0	—		2	0	—		23	3
IFK Göteborg	1990	Allsvenskan	8	0	2	0	—		—		—		10	0
IFK Göteborg	1991	Allsvenskan	16	0	6	0	—		3	0	10	0	35	0
IFK Göteborg	1992	Allsvenskan	15	0	1	0	—		6	0	9	0	31	0
IFK Göteborg	1993	Allsvenskan	26	0	3	0	—		4	0	—		33	0
IFK Göteborg	1994	Allsvenskan	22	0	1	0	—		7	1	—		30	1
IFK Göteborg	1995	Allsvenskan	20	1	5	0	—		4	0	—		29	1
IFK Göteborg	Total		144	4	21	0	—		26	1	19	0	191	5
Leicester City	1995–96	First Division	1	0	—		1	0	—		—		2	0
Leicester City	1996–97	Premier League	10	0	2	0	3	0	—		—		15	0
Leicester City	1997–98	Premier League	35	0	2	0	—		2	0	—		39	0
Leicester City	1998–99	Premier League	19	0	—		1	0	—		—		20	0
Leicester City	Total		65	0	4	0	5	0	2	0	—		76	0
AIK	1999	Allsvenskan	9	0	1	0	—		8	0	—		18	0
AIK	2000	Allsvenskan	2	0	2	0	—		—		—		4	0
AIK	Total		11	0	3	0	—		8	0	—		22	0
IFK Göteborg	2001	Allsvenskan	21	0	3	0	—		—		—		24	0
IFK Göteborg	2002	Allsvenskan	3	0	—		—		—		—		3	0
IFK Göteborg	Total		24	0	3	0	—		—		—		27	0
Career total			299	10	31	0	5	0	36	1	19	0	360	11

=== International ===
Appearances and goals by national team and year
National team	Year	Apps	Goals
Sweden	1990	2	0
Sweden	1991	0	0
Sweden	1992	1	0
Sweden	1993	4	0
Sweden	1994	12	0
Sweden	1995	9	0
Sweden	1996	0	0
Sweden	1997	6	0
Sweden	1998	5	0
Sweden	1999	10	0
Sweden	2000	4	0
Sweden	2001	3	0
Sweden	2002	1	0
Total		57	0

== Honours ==
IFK Göteborg

- Allsvenskan: 1990, 1991, 1993, 1994, 1995
- Svenska Cupen: 1991

Leicester City

- Football League Cup: 1996–97; runner-up: 1998–99

Sweden

- FIFA World Cup third place: 1994
