= 1999 Division 1 (Swedish football) =

Swedish Premier League season

Swedish League Division 1
- Season: 1999
- Champions: GIF Sundsvall; BK Häcken
- Promoted: GIF Sundsvall; BK Häcken
- Relegated: Gefle IF; Degerfors IF; IF Brommapojkarna; Nacka FF; Lira Luleå BK; IK Sirius; Spårvägens FF; Kristianstads FF; IK Kongahälla; Husqvarna FF; Falkenbergs FF; Motala AIF; Stenungsunds IF

Statistics of Swedish football Division 1 in season 1999.

== Overview ==
It was contested by 28 teams, and GIF Sundsvall and BK Häcken won the championship.

== League standings ==
=== Norra ===
Pos	Team	Pld	W	D	L	GF	GA	GD	Pts
1	GIF Sundsvall	26	13	9	4	65	32	+33	48
2	Assyriska Föreningen	26	14	5	7	44	25	+19	47
3	IF Sylvia	26	15	2	9	47	33	+14	47
4	Enköpings SK	26	13	6	7	40	26	+14	45
5	IK Brage	26	12	3	11	33	26	+7	39
6	Västerås SK	26	10	7	9	32	24	+8	37
7	Umeå FC	26	9	9	8	32	28	+4	36
8	Gefle IF	26	10	6	10	32	38	−6	36
9	Degerfors IF	26	9	8	9	34	36	−2	35
10	IF Brommapojkarna	26	9	4	13	31	42	−11	31
11	Nacka FF	26	8	7	11	28	39	−11	31
12	Lira Luleå BK	26	8	4	14	31	45	−14	28
13	IK Sirius	26	6	7	13	27	52	−25	25
14	Spårvägens FF	26	6	3	17	18	48	−30	21

=== Södra ===
Pos	Team	Pld	W	D	L	GF	GA	GD	Pts
1	BK Häcken	26	15	6	5	62	28	+34	51
2	GAIS	26	14	7	5	35	27	+8	49
3	Mjällby AIF	26	15	2	9	51	33	+18	47
4	Ljungskile SK	26	13	7	6	38	26	+12	46
5	Landskrona BoIS	26	12	9	5	52	30	+22	45
6	Gunnilse IS	26	12	6	8	39	30	+9	42
7	Åtvidabergs FF	26	11	8	7	38	32	+6	41
8	Östers IF	26	11	6	9	32	30	+2	39
9	Kristianstads FF	26	9	4	13	34	46	−12	31
10	IK Kongahälla	26	7	7	12	31	40	−9	28
11	Husqvarna FF	26	8	3	15	32	50	−18	27
12	Falkenbergs FF	26	8	2	16	36	59	−23	26
13	Motala AIF	26	7	2	17	28	47	−19	23
14	Stenungsunds IF	26	4	3	19	28	58	−30	15
