= 1998 in Swedish football =

The 1998 season in Swedish football, started January 1998 and ended December 1998.

== Honours ==
=== Official titles ===
Title	Team	Reason
Swedish Champions 1998	AIK	Winners of Allsvenskan
Swedish Cup Champions 1997–98	Helsingborgs IF	Winners of Svenska Cupen

=== Competitions ===
Level	Competition	Team
1st level	Allsvenskan 1998	AIK
2nd level	Division 1 Norra 1998	Djurgårdens IF
2nd level	Division 1 Södra 1998	Kalmar FF
Cup	Svenska Cupen 1997–98	Helsingborgs IF

== Promotions, relegations and qualifications ==
=== Promotions ===
Promoted from	Promoted to	Team	Reason
Division 1 Norra 1998	Allsvenskan 1999	Djurgårdens IF	Winners
Division 1 Södra 1998	Allsvenskan 1999	Kalmar FF	Winners
Division 2 1998	Division 1 Norra 1999	IF Brommapojkarna	Winners of Östra Svealand
Division 2 1998	Division 1 Norra 1999	Enköpings SK	Winners of Västra Svealand
Division 2 1998	Division 1 Norra 1999	Lira Luleå BK	Winners of Norrland
Division 2 1998	Division 1 Södra 1999	GAIS	Winners of Västra Götaland
Division 2 1998	Division 1 Södra 1999	Husqvarna FF	Winners of Östra Götaland
Division 2 1998	Division 1 Södra 1999	Kristianstads FF	Winners of Södra Götaland
Division 2 1998	Division 1 Södra 1999	IK Kongahälla	Winners of qualification play-off

=== League transfers ===
Transferred from	Transferred to	Team	Reason
Division 1 Södra 1998	Division 1 Norra 1999	IF Sylvia	Geographical composition

=== Relegations ===
Relegated from	Relegated to	Team	Reason
Allsvenskan 1998	Division 1 Södra 1999	BK Häcken	13th team
Allsvenskan 1998	Division 1 Södra 1999	Östers IF	14th team
Division 1 Norra 1998	Division 2 1999	Gefle IF	Losers of qualification play-off
Division 1 Norra 1998	Division 2 1999	Piteå IF	12th team
Division 1 Norra 1998	Division 2 1999	Ludvika FK	13th team
Division 1 Norra 1998	Division 2 1999	IFK Luleå	14th team
Division 1 Södra 1998	Division 2 1999	IFK Hässleholm	12th team
Division 1 Södra 1998	Division 2 1999	Lundby IF	13th team
Division 1 Södra 1998	Division 2 1999	IS Halmia	14th team

=== International qualifications ===
Qualified for	Enters	Team	Reason
UEFA Champions League 1999–2000	2nd qualifying round	AIK	Winners of Allsvenskan
UEFA Cup 1999–2000	Qualifying round	Helsingborgs IF	2nd team in Allsvenskan
UEFA Cup Winners' Cup 1998–99	Qualifying round	Helsingborgs IF	Winners of Svenska Cupen
UEFA Intertoto Cup 1999	2nd round	Hammarby IF	3rd team in Allsvenskan
UEFA Intertoto Cup 1999	1st round	Halmstads BK	4th team in Allsvenskan

== Domestic results ==
=== Allsvenskan 1998 ===
	Team	Pld	W	D	L	GF		GA	GD	Pts
1	AIK	26	11	13	2	25	–	15	+10	46
2	Helsingborgs IF	26	12	8	6	43	–	28	+15	44
3	Hammarby IF	26	11	9	6	39	–	34	+5	42
4	Halmstads BK	26	12	5	9	42	–	40	+18	41
5	Västra Frölunda IF	26	10	8	8	29	–	31	-2	38
6	Örebro SK	26	10	6	10	35	–	38	-3	36
7	IFK Norrköping	26	9	8	9	43	–	35	+8	35
8	IFK Göteborg	26	9	8	9	27	–	29	-2	35
9	Malmö FF	26	9	6	11	35	–	30	+5	33
10	IF Elfsborg	26	8	9	9	36	–	33	+3	33
11	Trelleborgs FF	26	8	8	10	31	–	35	-4	32
12	Örgryte IS	26	7	7	12	35	–	36	-1	28
13	BK Häcken	26	7	6	13	27	–	46	-19	27
14	Östers IF	26	5	7	14	26	–	43	-17	22

=== Allsvenskan qualification play-off 1998 ===
November 12, 1998

Landskrona BoIS	2–3	Trelleborgs FF

?, Landskrona
November 15, 1998

Trelleborgs FF	4–1	Landskrona BoIS

?, Trelleborg

November 12, 1998

Umeå FC	2–3	Örgryte IS

?, Umeå
November 15, 1998

Örgryte IS	3–0	Umeå FC

?, Gothenburg

=== Division 1 Norra 1998 ===
	Team	Pld	W	D	L	GF		GA	GD	Pts
1	Djurgårdens IF	26	17	3	6	53	–	30	+23	54
2	Umeå FC	26	14	7	5	59	–	40	+19	49
3	Västerås SK	26	14	5	7	48	–	32	+16	47
4	GIF Sundsvall	26	13	3	10	44	–	37	+7	42
5	Assyriska Föreningen	26	12	5	9	41	–	37	+4	41
6	IK Brage	26	10	8	8	37	–	41	-4	38
7	IK Sirius	26	10	6	10	29	–	27	+2	36
8	Degerfors IF	26	9	9	8	45	–	44	+1	36
9	Nacka FF	26	9	9	8	34	–	45	-11	36
10	Spårvägens FF	26	7	7	12	30	–	37	-7	28
11	Gefle IF	26	7	6	13	27	–	32	-5	27
12	Piteå IF	26	5	10	11	28	–	38	-10	25
13	Ludvika FK	26	7	4	15	35	–	46	-11	25
14	IFK Luleå	26	5	4	17	17	–	41	-24	19

=== Division 1 Södra 1998 ===
	Team	Pld	W	D	L	GF		GA	GD	Pts
1	Kalmar FF	26	15	6	5	49	–	23	+26	51
2	Landskrona BoIS	26	15	5	6	64	–	37	+27	50
3	IF Sylvia	26	14	5	7	37	–	26	+11	47
4	Åtvidabergs FF	26	14	4	8	49	–	38	+11	46
5	Stenungsunds IF	26	13	6	7	40	–	34	+6	45
6	Panos Ljungskile SK	26	12	4	10	37	–	34	+3	40
7	Falkenbergs FF	26	12	2	12	35	–	47	-12	38
8	Gunnilse IS	26	11	3	12	41	–	42	-1	36
9	Mjällby AIF	26	10	4	12	45	–	52	-7	34
10	Motala AIF	26	8	9	9	31	–	29	+2	33
11	Norrby IF	26	9	4	13	34	–	46	-12	31
12	IFK Hässleholm	26	7	5	14	34	–	42	-8	26
13	Lundby IF	26	5	4	17	25	–	47	-22	19
14	IS Halmia	26	5	3	18	24	–	48	-24	18

=== Division 1 qualification play-off 1998 ===
1st round

November 1, 1998

Väsby IK	1–1	Gefle IF

?, ?
November 4, 1998

Gefle IF	1–0	Väsby IK

?, ?

October 31, 1998

Östersunds FK	1–1	Tyresö FF

?, ?
November 4, 1998

Tyresö FF	1–2	Östersunds FK

?, ?

October 31, 1998

Myresjö IF	1–1	Norrby IF

?, ?
November 4, 1998

Norrby IF	0–1	Myresjö IF

?, ?

October 31, 1998

IK Kongahälla	3–1	IFK Malmö

?, ?
November 4, 1998

IFK Malmö	2–1	IK Kongahälla

?, ?

2nd round

November 8, 1998

Östersunds FK	0–2	Gefle IF

?, ?
November 15, 1998

Gefle IF	1–1	Östersunds FK

?, ?

November 7, 1998

Myresjö IF	0–1	IK Kongahälla

?, ?
November 14, 1998

IK Kongahälla	1–0	Myresjö IF

?, ?

=== Svenska Cupen 1997–98 ===
Final

May 14, 1998

Örgryte IS	1–1	Helsingborgs IF

Gamla Ullevi, Gothenburg
May 21, 1998

Helsingborgs IF	1–1 1–1 (aet) 4–1 (apen)	Örgryte IS

Olympia, Helsingborg
