= 1998 Division 1 (Swedish football) =

Swedish League Division 1
- Season: 1998
- Champions: Djurgårdens IF; Kalmar FF
- Promoted: Djurgårdens IF; Kalmar FF
- Relegated: Gefle IF; Piteå IF; Ludvika FK; IFK Luleå; IFK Hässleholm; Lundby IF; IS Halmia

Statistics of Swedish football Division 1 in season 1998.

== Overview ==
It was contested by 28 teams, and Djurgårdens IF and Kalmar FF won the championship.

== League standings ==
=== Norra ===
Pos	Team	Pld	W	D	L	GF	GA	GD	Pts
1	Djurgårdens IF	26	17	3	6	53	30	+23	54
2	Umeå FC	26	14	7	5	59	40	+19	49
3	Västerås SK	26	14	5	7	48	32	+16	47
4	GIF Sundsvall	26	13	3	10	44	37	+7	42
5	Assyriska Föreningen	26	12	5	9	41	37	+4	41
6	IK Brage	26	10	8	8	37	41	−4	38
7	IK Sirius	26	10	6	10	29	27	+2	36
8	Degerfors IF	26	9	9	8	45	44	+1	36
9	Nacka FF	26	9	9	8	34	45	−11	36
10	Spårvägens FF	26	7	7	12	30	37	−7	28
11	Gefle IF	26	7	6	13	27	32	−5	27
12	Piteå IF	26	5	10	11	28	38	−10	25
13	Ludvika FK	26	7	4	15	35	46	−11	25
14	IFK Luleå	26	5	4	17	17	41	−24	19

=== Södra ===
Pos	Team	Pld	W	D	L	GF	GA	GD	Pts
1	Kalmar FF	26	15	6	5	49	23	+26	51
2	Landskrona BoIS	26	15	5	6	64	37	+27	50
3	IF Sylvia	26	14	5	7	37	26	+11	47
4	Åtvidabergs FF	26	14	4	8	49	38	+11	46
5	Stenungsunds IF	26	13	6	7	40	34	+6	45
6	Panos Ljungskile SK	26	12	4	10	37	34	+3	40
7	Falkenbergs FF	26	12	2	12	35	47	−12	38
8	Gunnilse IS	26	11	3	12	41	42	−1	36
9	Mjällby AIF	26	10	4	12	45	52	−7	34
10	Motala AIF	26	8	9	9	31	29	+2	33
11	Norrby IF	26	9	4	13	34	46	−12	31
12	IFK Hässleholm	26	7	5	14	34	42	−8	26
13	Lundby IF	26	5	4	17	25	47	−22	19
14	IS Halmia	26	5	3	18	24	48	−24	18
