= 1995 Division 1 (Swedish football) =

Swedish League Division 1
- Season: 1995
- Champions: Umeå FC; IK Oddevold
- Promoted: Umeå FC; IK Oddevold
- Relegated: Assyriska Föreningen; Väsby IK; Lira Luleå BK; Norrby IF; Myresjö IF; Skövde AIK; Landskrona BoIS

Statistics of Swedish football Division 1 in season 1995.

== Overview ==
It was contested by 28 teams, and Umeå FC and IK Oddevold won the championship.

== League standings ==
=== Norra ===
Pos	Team	Pld	W	D	L	GF	GA	GD	Pts
1	Umeå FC	26	13	9	4	41	22	+19	48
2	Gefle IF	26	12	9	5	49	26	+23	45
3	Vasalunds IF	26	11	11	4	46	28	+18	44
4	Visby IF Gute	26	11	7	8	45	52	−7	40
5	IK Brage	26	11	6	9	50	44	+6	39
6	IFK Luleå	26	9	9	8	45	38	+7	36
7	GIF Sundsvall	26	8	10	8	31	23	+8	34
8	IF Brommapojkarna	26	9	7	10	39	23	+16	34
9	Västerås SK	26	9	7	10	35	36	−1	34
10	BK Forward	26	8	10	8	28	34	−6	34
11	IK Sirius	26	7	8	11	29	41	−12	29
12	Assyriska Föreningen	26	6	7	13	24	41	−17	25
13	Väsby IK	26	4	12	10	23	40	−17	24
14	Lira Luleå BK	26	4	8	14	25	53	−28	20

=== Södra ===
Pos	Team	Pld	W	D	L	GF	GA	GD	Pts
1	IK Oddevold	26	17	3	6	59	29	+30	54
2	GAIS	26	13	9	4	55	35	+20	48
3	IF Elfsborg	26	14	5	7	55	40	+15	47
4	Kalmar FF	26	12	6	8	60	45	+15	42
5	Ljungskile SK	26	10	9	7	42	35	+7	39
6	Gunnilse IS	26	9	7	10	40	36	+4	34
7	BK Häcken	26	8	10	8	42	47	−5	34
8	IFK Hässleholm	26	10	4	12	48	65	−17	34
9	Falkenbergs FF	26	9	6	11	35	36	−1	33
10	Stenungsunds IF	26	7	11	8	31	33	−2	32
11	Norrby IF	26	9	4	13	37	40	−3	31
12	Myresjö IF	26	8	6	12	37	50	−13	30
13	Skövde AIK	26	6	5	15	43	58	−15	23
14	Landskrona BoIS	26	7	1	18	31	66	−35	22
