= 1997 Division 1 (Swedish football) =

Swedish League Division 1
- Season: 1997
- Champions: Hammarby IF; Västra Frölunda IF
- Promoted: Hammarby IF; Västra Frölunda IF; BK Häcken
- Relegated: Lira Luleå BK; Enköpings SK; IF Brommapojkarna; Vasalund IF; Hertzöga BK; Myresjö IF; IFK Malmö; IK Oddevold
- Top goalscorer: Mathias Larsson, Tomas Rosenkvist, and Kjell-Åke Engström (22 goals, Norra); Hans Berggren (20 goals, Norra)

Statistics of Swedish football Division 1 in season 1997.

== Overview ==
It was contested by 28 teams, and Hammarby IF and Västra Frölunda IF won the championship.

Vasalund IF was awarded technical losses in nine matches due to using four non-EU-players per match (among them Jones Kusi-Asare), one more than the allowed three.

== League standings ==
=== Norra ===
| Pos | Team | Pld | W | D | L | GF | GA | GD | Pts |
|---|---|---|---|---|---|---|---|---|---|
| 1 | Hammarby IF | 26 | 19 | 5 | 2 | 55 | 17 | +38 | 62 |
| 2 | Djurgårdens IF | 26 | 17 | 6 | 3 | 65 | 30 | +35 | 57 |
| 3 | Umeå FC | 26 | 12 | 7 | 7 | 52 | 38 | +14 | 43 |
| 4 | GIF Sundsvall | 26 | 11 | 6 | 9 | 40 | 31 | +9 | 39 |
| 5 | Gefle IF | 26 | 10 | 7 | 9 | 44 | 31 | +13 | 37 |
| 6 | Nacka FF | 26 | 10 | 7 | 9 | 36 | 48 | −12 | 37 |
| 7 | IFK Luleå | 26 | 9 | 9 | 8 | 27 | 29 | −2 | 36 |
| 8 | IK Brage | 26 | 8 | 8 | 10 | 48 | 39 | +9 | 32 |
| 9 | Assyriska Föreningen | 26 | 8 | 8 | 10 | 35 | 48 | −13 | 32 |
| 10 | Spårvägens FF | 26 | 6 | 11 | 9 | 33 | 39 | −6 | 29 |
| 11 | Lira Luleå BK | 26 | 7 | 8 | 11 | 36 | 45 | −9 | 29 |
| 12 | Enköpings SK | 26 | 8 | 5 | 13 | 37 | 47 | −10 | 29 |
| 13 | IF Brommapojkarna | 26 | 6 | 7 | 13 | 27 | 47 | −20 | 25 |
| 14 | Vasalunds IF | 26 | 2 | 4 | 20 | 18 | 64 | −46 | 10 |

=== Södra ===
| Pos | Team | Pld | W | D | L | GF | GA | GD | Pts |
|---|---|---|---|---|---|---|---|---|---|
| 1 | Västra Frölunda IF | 26 | 15 | 9 | 2 | 72 | 24 | +48 | 54 |
| 2 | BK Häcken | 26 | 15 | 6 | 5 | 64 | 29 | +35 | 51 |
| 3 | Gunnilse IS | 26 | 14 | 9 | 3 | 55 | 23 | +32 | 51 |
| 4 | Åtvidabergs FF | 26 | 11 | 9 | 6 | 37 | 38 | −1 | 42 |
| 5 | Stenungsunds IF | 26 | 11 | 7 | 8 | 43 | 35 | +8 | 40 |
| 6 | Mjällby AIF | 26 | 9 | 10 | 7 | 42 | 38 | +4 | 37 |
| 7 | IFK Hässleholm | 26 | 11 | 4 | 11 | 46 | 44 | +2 | 37 |
| 8 | Motala AIF | 26 | 10 | 7 | 9 | 31 | 35 | −4 | 37 |
| 9 | Falkenbergs FF | 26 | 9 | 8 | 9 | 50 | 38 | +12 | 35 |
| 10 | Norrby IF | 26 | 8 | 9 | 9 | 41 | 45 | −4 | 33 |
| 11 | Hertzöga BK | 26 | 5 | 11 | 10 | 34 | 53 | −19 | 26 |
| 12 | Myresjö IF | 26 | 6 | 2 | 18 | 27 | 65 | −38 | 20 |
| 13 | IFK Malmö | 26 | 3 | 8 | 15 | 30 | 63 | −33 | 17 |
| 14 | IK Oddevold | 26 | 4 | 3 | 19 | 24 | 66 | −42 | 15 |
