= 1997 in Swedish football =

The 1997 season in Swedish football, starting January 1997 and ending December 1997:

== Honours ==
=== Official titles ===
Title	Team	Reason
Swedish Champions 1997	Halmstads BK	Winners of Allsvenskan
Swedish Cup Champions 1996–97	AIK	Winners of Svenska Cupen

=== Competitions ===
Level	Competition	Team
1st level	Allsvenskan 1997	Halmstads BK
2nd level	Division 1 Norra 1997	Hammarby IF
2nd level	Division 1 Södra 1997	Västra Frölunda IF
Cup	Svenska Cupen 1996–97	AIK

== Promotions, relegations and qualifications ==
=== Promotions ===
Promoted from	Promoted to	Team	Reason
Division 1 Norra 1997	Allsvenskan 1998	Hammarby IF	Winners
Division 1 Södra 1997	Allsvenskan 1998	Västra Frölunda IF	Winners
Division 1 Södra 1997	Allsvenskan 1998	BK Häcken	Winners of qualification play-off
Division 2 1997	Division 1 Norra 1998	Ludvika FK	Winners of Västra Svealand
Division 2 1997	Division 1 Norra 1998	Piteå IF	Winners of Norrland
Division 2 1997	Division 1 Norra 1998	IK Sirius	Winners of Östra Svealand
Division 2 1997	Division 1 Södra 1998	Kalmar FF	Winners of Östra Götaland
Division 2 1997	Division 1 Södra 1998	Landskrona BoIS	Winners of Södra Götaland
Division 2 1997	Division 1 Södra 1998	Lundby IF	Winners of Västra Götaland
Division 2 1997	Division 1 Södra 1998	IS Halmia	Winners of qualification play-off
Division 2 1997	Division 1 Södra 1998	IF Sylvia	Winners of qualification play-off

=== Relegations ===
Relegated from	Relegated to	Team	Reason
Allsvenskan 1997	Division 1 Norra 1998	Västerås SK	Losers of qualification play-off
Allsvenskan 1997	Division 1 Norra 1998	Degerfors IF	13th team
Allsvenskan 1997	Division 1 Södra 1998	Panos Ljungskile SK	14th team
Division 1 Norra 1997	Division 2 1998	Lira Luleå BK	Losers of qualification play-off
Division 1 Norra 1997	Division 2 1998	Enköpings SK	12th team
Division 1 Norra 1997	Division 2 1998	IF Brommapojkarna	13th team
Division 1 Norra 1997	Division 2 1998	Vasalunds IF	14th team
Division 1 Södra 1997	Division 2 1998	Hertzöga BK	Losers of qualification play-off
Division 1 Södra 1997	Division 2 1998	Myresjö IF	12th team
Division 1 Södra 1997	Division 2 1998	IFK Malmö	13th team
Division 1 Södra 1997	Division 2 1998	IK Oddevold	14th team

=== International qualifications ===
Qualified for	Enters	Team	Reason
UEFA Champions League 1998–99	1st qualifying round	Halmstads BK	Winners of Allsvenskan
UEFA Cup 1998–99	1st qualifying round	IFK Göteborg	2nd team in Allsvenskan
UEFA Cup 1998–99	1st qualifying round	Malmö FF	3rd team in Allsvenskan
UEFA Cup Winners' Cup 1997–98	1st round	AIK	Winners of Svenska Cupen
UEFA Intertoto Cup 1998	2nd round	Örebro SK	4th team in Allsvenskan
UEFA Intertoto Cup 1998	1st round	Örgryte IS	5th team in Allsvenskan

== Domestic results ==
=== Allsvenskan 1997 ===
	Team	Pld	W	D	L	GF		GA	GD	Pts
1	Halmstads BK	26	17	1	8	49	–	27	+22	52
2	IFK Göteborg	26	14	7	5	50	–	32	+18	49
3	Malmö FF	26	12	10	4	48	–	28	+20	46
4	Örebro SK	26	13	7	6	43	–	34	+9	46
5	Örgryte IS	26	12	7	7	34	–	29	+5	43
6	Helsingborgs IF	26	10	11	5	40	–	28	+12	41
7	IF Elfsborg	26	12	5	9	45	–	35	+10	41
8	AIK	26	9	10	7	38	–	26	+12	37
9	IFK Norrköping	26	7	7	12	27	–	36	-9	28
10	Trelleborgs FF	26	8	4	14	32	–	48	-16	28
11	Östers IF	26	4	11	11	28	–	44	-16	23
12	Västerås SK	26	6	5	15	26	–	49	-23	23
13	Degerfors IF	26	4	8	14	29	–	47	-18	20
14	Panos Ljungskile SK	26	5	5	16	31	–	57	-26	20

=== Allsvenskan qualification play-off 1997 ===
October 29, 1997

Djurgårdens IF	1–1	Östers IF

Stockholms Stadion, Stockholm
November 1, 1997

Östers IF	2–0	Djurgårdens IF

Värensvallen, Växjö

November 5, 1997

BK Häcken	1–1	Västerås SK

?, Gothenburg
November 6, 1997

Västerås SK	2–4	BK Häcken

?, Västerås

=== Division 1 Norra 1997 ===
	Team	Pld	W	D	L	GF		GA	GD	Pts
1	Hammarby IF	26	19	5	2	55	–	17	+38	62
2	Djurgårdens IF	26	17	6	3	65	–	30	+35	57
3	Umeå FC	26	12	7	7	52	–	38	+14	43
4	GIF Sundsvall	26	11	6	9	40	–	31	+9	39
5	Gefle IF	26	10	7	9	44	–	31	+13	37
6	Nacka FF	26	10	7	9	36	–	48	-12	37
7	IFK Luleå	26	9	9	8	27	–	29	-2	36
8	IK Brage	26	8	8	10	48	–	39	+9	32
9	Assyriska Föreningen	26	8	8	10	35	–	48	-13	32
10	Spårvägens FF	26	6	11	9	33	–	39	-6	29
11	Lira Luleå BK	26	7	8	11	36	–	45	-9	29
12	Enköpings SK	26	8	5	13	37	–	47	-10	29
13	IF Brommapojkarna	26	6	7	13	27	–	47	-20	25
14	Vasalunds IF	26	2	4	20	18	–	64	-46	10

=== Division 1 Södra 1997 ===
	Team	Pld	W	D	L	GF		GA	GD	Pts
1	Västra Frölunda IF	26	15	9	2	72	–	24	+48	54
2	BK Häcken	26	15	6	5	64	–	29	+35	51
3	Gunnilse IS	26	14	9	3	55	–	23	+32	51
4	Åtvidabergs FF	26	11	9	6	37	–	38	-1	42
5	Stenungsunds IF	26	11	7	8	43	–	35	+8	40
6	Mjällby AIF	26	9	10	7	42	–	38	+4	37
7	IFK Hässleholm	26	11	4	11	46	–	44	+2	37
8	Motala AIF	26	10	7	9	31	–	35	-4	37
9	Falkenbergs FF	26	9	8	9	50	–	38	+12	35
10	Norrby IF	26	8	9	9	41	–	45	-4	33
11	Hertzöga BK	26	5	11	10	34	–	53	-19	26
12	Myresjö IF	26	6	2	18	27	–	65	-38	20
13	IFK Malmö	26	3	8	15	30	–	63	-33	17
14	IK Oddevold	26	4	3	19	24	–	66	-42	15

=== Division 1 qualification play-off 1997 ===
1st round

October 25, 1997

Lira Luleå BK	1–1	Skellefteå AIK

?, ?
October 29, 1997

Skellefteå AIK	1–3	Lira Luleå BK

?, ?

October 26, 1997

Sandvikens IF	2–1	IF Sylvia

?, ?
October 29, 1997

IF Sylvia	(ag) 1–0	Sandvikens IF

?, ?

October 25, 1997

Hertzöga BK	3–2	Nybro IF

?, ?
October 29, 1997

Nybro IF	(ag) 2–1	Hertzöga BK

?, ?

October 25, 1997

Trollhättans FK	0–2	IS Halmia

?, ?
October 29, 1997

IS Halmia	4–1	Trollhättans FK

?, ?

2nd round

November 1, 1997

IF Sylvia	1–0	Lira Luleå BK

?, ?
November 8, 1997

Lira Luleå BK	1–1	IF Sylvia

?, ?

November 1, 1997

IS Halmia	0–0	Nybro IF

?, ?
November 8, 1997

Nybro IF	2–3	IS Halmia

?, ?

=== Svenska Cupen 1996–97 ===
Final

May 29, 1997

IF Elfsborg	1–2	AIK

Ryavallen, Borås
