= 1996 in Swedish football =

The 1996 season in Swedish football, starting January 1996 and ending December 1996:

== Honours ==
=== Official titles ===
Title	Team	Reason
Swedish Champions 1996	IFK Göteborg	Winners of Allsvenskan
Swedish Cup Champions 1995–96	AIK	Winners of Svenska Cupen

=== Competitions ===
Level	Competition	Team
1st level	Allsvenskan 1996	IFK Göteborg
2nd level	Division 1 Norra 1996	Västerås SK
2nd level	Division 1 Södra 1996	IF Elfsborg
Cup	Svenska Cupen 1995–96	AIK

== Promotions, relegations and qualifications ==
=== Promotions ===
Promoted from	Promoted to	Team	Reason
Division 1 Norra 1996	Allsvenskan 1997	Västerås SK	Winners
Division 1 Södra 1996	Allsvenskan 1997	IF Elfsborg	Winners
Division 1 Södra 1996	Allsvenskan 1997	Ljungskile SK	Winners of qualification play-off
Division 2 1996	Division 1 Norra 1997	Assyriska Föreningen	Winners of Västra Svealand
Division 2 1996	Division 1 Norra 1997	Lira Luleå BK	Winners of Norrland
Division 2 1996	Division 1 Norra 1997	Nacka FF	Winners of Östra Svealand
Division 2 1996	Division 1 Norra 1997	Enköpings SK	Winners of qualification play-off
Division 2 1996	Division 1 Södra 1997	IFK Malmö	Winners of Södra Götaland
Division 2 1996	Division 1 Södra 1997	Myresjö IF	Winners of Östra Götaland
Division 2 1996	Division 1 Södra 1997	Norrby IF	Winners of Västra Götaland

=== League transfers ===
Transferred from	Transferred to	Team	Reason
Division 1 Norra 1996	Division 1 Södra 1997	Hertzöga BK	Geographical composition

=== Relegations ===
Relegated from	Relegated to	Team	Reason
Allsvenskan 1996	Division 1 Norra 1996	Umeå FC	Losers of qualification play-off
Allsvenskan 1996	Division 1 Norra 1996	Djurgårdens IF	13th team
Allsvenskan 1996	Division 1 Södra 1997	IK Oddevold	14th team
Division 1 Norra 1996	Division 2 1997	Visby IF Gute	Losers of qualification play-off
Division 1 Norra 1996	Division 2 1997	IK Sirius	12th team
Division 1 Norra 1996	Division 2 1997	BK Forward	13th team
Division 1 Norra 1996	Division 2 1997	Gimonäs CK	14th team
Division 1 Södra 1996	Division 2 1997	Lundby IF	12th team
Division 1 Södra 1996	Division 2 1997	GAIS	13th team
Division 1 Södra 1996	Division 2 1997	Kalmar FF	14th team

=== International qualifications ===
Qualified for	Enters	Team	Reason
UEFA Champions League 1997–98	Qualifying round	IFK Göteborg	Winners of Allsvenskan
UEFA Cup 1997–98	Qualifying round	Malmö FF	2nd team in Allsvenskan
UEFA Cup 1997–98	Qualifying round	Helsingborgs IF	3rd team in Allsvenskan
UEFA Cup 1997–98	Qualifying round	Örebro SK	5th team in Allsvenskan
UEFA Cup Winners' Cup 1996–97	1st round	AIK	Winners of Svenska Cupen
UEFA Intertoto Cup 1997	Group stage	Östers IF	6th team in Allsvenskan
UEFA Intertoto Cup 1997	Group stage	Halmstads BK	7th team in Allsvenskan

== Domestic results ==
=== Allsvenskan 1996 ===
	Team	Pld	W	D	L	GF		GA	GD	Pts
1	IFK Göteborg	26	17	5	4	61	–	23	+38	56
2	Malmö FF	26	13	7	6	33	–	26	+7	46
3	Helsingborgs IF	26	13	5	8	39	–	26	+13	44
4	AIK	26	12	7	7	36	–	23	+13	43
5	Örebro SK	26	13	3	10	34	–	29	+5	42
6	Östers IF	26	10	6	10	37	–	39	-2	36
7	Halmstads BK	26	9	8	9	34	–	37	-3	35
8	IFK Norrköping	26	9	7	10	31	–	29	+2	34
9	Degerfors IF	26	9	7	10	34	–	41	-7	34
10	Örgryte IS	26	8	7	11	27	–	30	-3	31
11	Umeå FC	26	8	6	12	35	–	45	-10	30
12	Trelleborgs FF	26	9	3	14	33	–	48	-15	30
13	Djurgårdens IF	26	8	3	15	28	–	43	-15	27
14	IK Oddevold	26	5	4	17	20	–	43	-23	19

=== Allsvenskan qualification play-off 1996 ===
October 30, 1996

Ljungskile SK	0–1	Umeå FC

?, Ljungskile
November 3, 1996

Umeå FC	2–3 (ag)	Ljungskile SK

?, Umeå

October 30, 1996

Hammarby IF	2–1	Trelleborgs FF

?, Stockholm
November 3, 1996

Trelleborgs FF	3–1	Hammarby IF

?, Trelleborg

=== Division 1 Norra 1996 ===
	Team	Pld	W	D	L	GF		GA	GD	Pts
1	Västerås SK	26	19	3	4	62	–	27	+35	60
2	Hammarby IF	26	16	4	6	61	–	37	+24	52
3	Spårvägens FF	26	14	5	7	51	–	28	+23	47
4	GIF Sundsvall	26	11	9	6	50	–	35	-15	42
5	IF Brommapojkarna	26	13	2	11	36	–	41	-5	41
6	IK Brage	26	11	7	8	42	–	37	+5	40
7	Gefle IF	26	12	3	11	38	–	36	+2	39
8	Hertzöga BK	26	9	6	11	29	–	39	+10	33
9	IFK Luleå	26	10	2	14	33	–	49	-16	32
10	Vasalunds IF	26	8	7	11	43	–	45	-2	31
11	Visby IF Gute	26	9	3	14	34	–	47	-13	30
12	IK Sirius	26	6	8	12	29	–	34	-5	26
13	BK Forward	26	5	5	16	30	–	51	-21	20
14	Gimonäs CK	26	4	6	16	26	–	58	-32	18

=== Division 1 Södra 1996 ===
	Team	Pld	W	D	L	GF		GA	GD	Pts
1	IF Elfsborg	26	15	5	6	59	–	24	+35	50
2	Ljungskile SK	26	13	9	4	53	–	33	+20	48
3	Stenungsunds IF	26	14	3	9	36	–	31	+5	45
4	BK Häcken	26	13	5	8	54	–	36	+18	44
5	Mjällby AIF	26	10	9	7	48	–	40	+8	37
6	IFK Hässleholm	26	9	10	7	29	–	40	-11	37
7	Gunnilse IS	26	8	10	8	33	–	39	-6	34
8	Västra Frölunda IF	26	9	5	12	43	–	37	+6	32
9	Motala AIF	26	8	7	11	32	–	39	-7	31
10	Åtvidabergs FF	26	7	10	9	25	–	36	-11	31
11	Falkenbergs FF	26	8	7	11	35	–	47	-12	31
12	Lundby IF	26	8	5	13	37	–	53	-16	29
13	GAIS	26	5	9	12	41	–	52	-11	24
14	Kalmar FF	26	5	8	13	21	–	39	-18	23

=== Division 1 qualification play-off 1996 ===
1st round

October 26, 1996

Piteå IF	0–2	Visby IF Gute

?, ?
October 30, 1996

Visby IF Gute	1–0	Piteå IF

?, ?

October 26, 1996

Enköpings SK	2–2	Sandvikens IF

?, ?
October 30, 1996

Sandvikens IF	2–2 2–3 (aet)	Enköpings SK

?, ?

October 27, 1996

Kalmar AIK	1–5	Falkenbergs FF

?, ?
October 30, 1996

Falkenbergs FF	2–1	Kalmar AIK

?, ?

October 27, 1996

Högaborgs BK	1–1	Qviding FIF

?, ?
October 30, 1996

Qviding FIF	3–1	Högaborgs BK

?, ?

2nd round

November 3, 1996

Visby IF Gute	1–0	Enköpings SK

?, ?
November 9, 1996

Enköpings SK	3–1	Visby IF Gute

?, ?

November 3, 1996

Falkenbergs FF	4–2	Qviding FIF

?, ?
November 9, 1996

Qviding FIF	2–2	Falkenbergs FF

?, ?

=== Svenska Cupen 1995–96 ===
Final

May 23, 1996

AIK	0–0 1–0 (agg)	Malmö FF

Gamla Ullevi, Gothenburg
