= 1996 Division 1 (Swedish football) =

Swedish League Division 1
- Season: 1996
- Champions: Västerås SK; IF Elfsborg
- Promoted: Västerås SK; IF Elfsborg; Ljungskile SK
- Relegated: Visby IF Gute; IK Sirius; BK Forward; Gimonäs CK; Lundby IF; GAIS; Kalmar FF

Statistics of Swedish football Division 1 in season 1996.

== Overview ==
It was contested by 28 teams, and Västerås SK and IF Elfsborg won the championship.

== League standings ==
=== Norra ===
Pos	Team	Pld	W	D	L	GF	GA	GD	Pts
1	Västerås SK	26	19	3	4	62	27	+35	60
2	Hammarby IF	26	16	4	6	61	37	+24	52
3	Spårvägens FF	26	14	5	7	51	28	+23	47
4	GIF Sundsvall	26	11	9	6	50	35	+15	42
5	IF Brommapojkarna	26	13	2	11	36	41	−5	41
6	IK Brage	26	11	7	8	42	37	+5	40
7	Gefle IF	26	12	3	11	38	36	+2	39
8	Hertzöga BK	26	9	6	11	29	39	−10	33
9	IFK Luleå	26	10	2	14	33	49	−16	32
10	Vasalunds IF	26	8	7	11	43	45	−2	31
11	Visby IF Gute	26	9	3	14	34	47	−13	30
12	IK Sirius	26	6	8	12	29	34	−5	26
13	BK Forward	26	5	5	16	30	51	−21	20
14	Gimonäs CK	26	4	6	16	26	58	−32	18

=== Södra ===
Pos	Team	Pld	W	D	L	GF	GA	GD	Pts
1	IF Elfsborg	26	15	5	6	59	24	+35	50
2	Ljungskile SK	26	13	9	4	53	33	+20	48
3	Stenungsunds IF	26	14	3	9	36	31	+5	45
4	BK Häcken	26	13	5	8	54	36	+18	44
5	Mjällby AIF	26	10	7	9	48	40	+8	37
6	IFK Hässleholm	26	9	10	7	29	40	−11	37
7	Gunnilse IS	26	8	10	8	33	39	−6	34
8	Västra Frölunda IF	26	9	5	12	43	37	+6	32
9	Motala AIF	26	8	7	11	32	39	−7	31
10	Åtvidabergs FF	26	7	10	9	25	36	−11	31
11	Falkenbergs FF	26	8	7	11	35	47	−12	31
12	Lundby IF	26	8	5	13	37	53	−16	29
13	GAIS	26	5	9	12	41	52	−11	24
14	Kalmar FF	26	5	8	13	21	39	−18	23
