= 2000 Division 2 (Swedish football) =

Swedish football league season

Statistics of the Swedish football Division 2 for the 2000 season.

== League standings ==
=== Division 2 Norrland ===
Pos	Team	Pld	W	D	L	GF	GA	GD	Pts	Qualification or relegation
1	Gefle IF	22	18	1	3	78	17	+61	55	Promotion Playoffs
2	Boden	22	12	4	6	44	31	+13	40	
3	Luleå Fotboll	22	11	4	7	38	31	+7	37	
4	Friska Viljor	22	11	2	9	38	34	+4	35	
5	Östersunds FK	22	9	6	7	30	23	+7	33	
6	Skellefteå AIK	22	7	9	6	27	31	−4	30	
7	Selånger	22	8	3	11	43	46	−3	27	
8	Kiruna	22	7	6	9	29	35	−6	27	
9	IFK Holmsund	22	7	5	10	26	43	−17	26	
10	Robertsfors	22	6	6	10	20	35	−15	24	Division 3 Relegation Playoffs
11	Piteå IF (R)	22	5	6	11	31	49	−18	21	Relegation to Division 3
12	IFK Timrå (R)	22	3	4	15	16	45	−29	13	Relegation to Division 3

Rules for classification: 1) points; 2) goal difference; 3) number of goals scored.
(R) Relegated

=== Division 2 Västra Svealand ===
Pos	Team	Pld	W	D	L	GF	GA	GD	Pts	Qualification or relegation
1	BK Forward	22	17	4	1	56	13	+43	55	Promotion Playoffs
2	Nacka FF	22	13	3	6	64	34	+30	42	
3	Syrianska FC	22	12	5	5	48	23	+25	41	
4	Degerfors IF	22	11	5	6	44	27	+17	38	
5	Rynninge	22	10	7	5	40	31	+9	37	
6	Eskilstuna City	22	10	1	11	34	43	−9	31	
7	Väsby IK	22	7	7	8	33	31	+2	28	
8	KB Karlskoga	22	8	1	13	34	50	−16	25	
9	Eskilstuna Södra	22	7	3	12	30	40	−10	24	
10	Vasalunds IF	22	5	9	8	22	32	−10	24	Division 3 Relegation Playoffs
11	Spånga (R)	22	5	3	14	29	57	−28	18	Relegation to Division 3
12	IFK Västerås (R)	22	2	2	18	21	74	−53	8	Relegation to Division 3

Rules for classification: 1) points; 2) goal difference; 3) number of goals scored.
(R) Relegated

=== Division 2 Östra Svealand ===
Pos	Team	Pld	W	D	L	GF	GA	GD	Pts	Qualification or relegation
1	IF Brommapojkarna	22	19	2	1	66	17	+49	59	Promotion Playoffs
2	Spårvägen	22	16	1	5	49	22	+27	49	
3	IK Sirius	22	11	6	5	41	29	+12	39	
4	Tyresö FF	22	10	3	9	30	31	−1	33	
5	Slätta	22	9	3	10	35	28	+7	30	
6	Vindhemspojkarna	22	9	2	11	45	39	+6	29	
7	Värtan	22	7	5	10	26	33	−7	26	
8	Sandvikens IF	22	6	6	10	23	40	−17	24	
9	Visby IF Gute	22	6	4	12	30	45	−15	22	
10	Vallentuna	22	6	4	12	26	42	−16	22	Division 3 Relegation Playoffs
11	Älta (R)	22	5	6	11	28	47	−19	21	Relegation to Division 3
12	Järfälla (R)	22	5	4	13	29	55	−26	19	Relegation to Division 3

Rules for classification: 1) points; 2) goal difference; 3) number of goals scored.
(R) Relegated

=== Division 2 Östra Götaland ===
Pos	Team	Pld	W	D	L	GF	GA	GD	Pts	Qualification or relegation
1	Motala AIF	22	15	2	5	46	24	+22	47	Promotion Playoffs
2	Myresjö IF	22	13	4	5	45	30	+15	43	
3	Tord	22	10	7	5	41	33	+8	37	
4	Husqvarna FF	22	10	6	6	40	33	+7	36	
5	Linköping	22	9	7	6	36	28	+8	34	
6	Ljungby	22	9	6	7	48	38	+10	33	
7	Jönköpings Södra IF	22	8	6	8	33	35	−2	30	
8	Grimsås	22	7	4	11	33	42	−9	25	
9	Nybro IF	22	5	9	8	36	41	−5	24	
10	IK Sleipner	22	6	6	10	26	39	−13	24	Division 3 Relegation Playoffs
11	Hjulsbro (R)	22	5	6	11	33	43	−10	21	Relegation to Division 3
12	Malmslätt (R)	22	2	3	17	20	51	−31	9	Relegation to Division 3

Rules for classification: 1) points; 2) goal difference; 3) number of goals scored.
(R) Relegated

=== Division 2 Västra Götaland ===
Pos	Team	Pld	W	D	L	GF	GA	GD	Pts	Qualification or relegation
1	Torslanda IK	22	13	3	6	50	24	+26	42	Promotion Playoffs
2	Qviding FIF	22	12	6	4	46	25	+21	42	
3	Kongahälla	22	11	7	4	38	26	+12	40	
4	Ytterby	22	11	4	7	47	36	+11	37	
5	Tidaholms GIF	22	10	6	6	40	25	+15	36	
6	Norrby IF	22	10	5	7	49	34	+15	35	
7	Skene	22	10	3	9	30	38	−8	33	
8	IF Heimer	22	7	6	9	32	43	−11	27	
9	Trollhättans FK	22	6	4	12	31	42	−11	22	
10	Skövde AIK	22	5	6	11	20	31	−11	21	Division 3 Relegation Playoffs
11	Lundby (R)	22	4	8	10	24	38	−14	20	Relegation to Division 3
12	Stenungsund (R)	22	2	4	16	18	63	−45	10	Relegation to Division 3

Rules for classification: 1) points; 2) goal difference; 3) number of goals scored.
(R) Relegated

=== Division 2 Södra Götaland ===
Pos	Team	Pld	W	D	L	GF	GA	GD	Pts	Qualification or relegation
1	IFK Malmö	22	14	5	3	52	25	+27	47	Promotion Playoffs
2	Falkenbergs FF	22	14	3	5	53	35	+18	45	
3	Helsingborgs Södra BIS	22	11	3	8	52	31	+21	36	
4	Lunds BK	22	10	6	6	39	31	+8	36	
5	IFK Trelleborg	22	10	5	7	41	32	+9	35	
6	Ystad	22	10	5	7	44	39	+5	35	
7	IF Leikin	22	9	5	8	44	43	+1	32	
8	Högaborg	22	9	4	9	27	43	−16	31	
9	Kristianstads FF	22	10	0	12	39	37	+2	30	
10	IFK Hässleholm	22	5	6	11	29	48	−19	21	Division 3 Relegation Playoffs
11	Karlskrona (R)	22	5	3	14	29	63	−34	18	Relegation to Division 3
12	Åhus Horna (R)	22	1	3	18	27	59	−32	6	Relegation to Division 3

Rules for classification: 1) points; 2) goal difference; 3) number of goals scored.
(R) Relegated
