= IFK Malmö (disambiguation) =

IFK Malmö is a Swedish sports club.

IFK Malmö may also refer to:

- IFK Malmö Bandy
- IFK Malmö Fotboll
- IFK Malmö Handboll
