= 1994 Division 1 (Swedish football) =

Swedish League Division 1
- Season: 1994
- Champions: Djurgårdens IF; Örgryte IS
- Promoted: Djurgårdens IF; Örgryte IS
- Relegated: Spånga IS; Kiruna FF; Spårvägens FF; Karlskrona AIF; IK Sleipner; Lunds BK; Jonsereds IF

Statistics of Swedish football Division 1 in season 1994.

== Overview ==
It was contested by 28 teams, and Djurgårdens IF and Örgryte IS won the championship.

== League standings ==
=== Norra ===
Pos	Team	Pld	W	D	L	GF	GA	GD	Pts
1	Djurgårdens IF	26	19	4	3	71	27	+44	61
2	Umeå FC	26	15	2	9	55	33	+22	47
3	IFK Luleå	26	12	9	5	44	30	+14	45
4	Vasalunds IF	26	13	4	9	57	49	+8	43
5	Gefle IF	26	12	5	9	38	28	+10	41
6	IK Brage	26	12	4	10	41	34	+7	40
7	GIF Sundsvall	26	10	3	13	35	47	−12	33
8	IF Brommapojkarna	26	8	8	10	39	37	+2	32
9	IK Sirius	26	8	8	10	35	45	−10	32
10	Västerås SK	26	9	5	12	39	53	−14	32
11	Visby IF Gute	26	8	7	11	37	47	−10	31
12	Spånga IS	26	6	6	14	24	38	−14	24
13	Kiruna FF	26	5	8	13	30	68	−38	23
14	Spårvägens FF	26	5	7	14	43	52	−9	22

=== Södra ===
Pos	Team	Pld	W	D	L	GF	GA	GD	Pts
1	Örgryte IS	26	17	4	5	50	13	+37	55
2	Kalmar FF	26	17	3	6	47	22	+25	54
3	IFK Hässleholm	26	14	7	5	58	39	+19	49
4	IF Elfsborg	26	14	4	8	45	32	+13	46
5	IK Oddevold	26	13	4	9	56	41	+15	43
6	GAIS	26	11	9	6	42	32	+10	42
7	Ljungskile SK	26	11	3	12	40	35	+5	36
8	Gunnilse IS	26	8	9	9	27	33	−6	33
9	Stenungsunds IF	26	9	4	13	40	41	−1	31
10	BK Forward	26	7	10	9	27	33	−6	31
11	Jonsereds IF	26	8	3	15	35	53	−18	27
12	Karlskrona AIF	26	7	5	14	28	55	−27	26
13	IK Sleipner	26	7	3	16	36	71	−35	24
14	Lunds BK	26	3	4	19	27	58	−31	13
