= 1994 in Swedish football =

The 1994 season in Swedish football, starting January 1994 and ending December 1994:

== Honours ==
=== Official titles ===
| Title | Team | Reason |
|---|---|---|
| Swedish Champions 1994 | IFK Göteborg | Winners of Allsvenskan |
| Swedish Cup Champions 1993–94 | IFK Norrköping | Winners of Svenska Cupen |

=== Competitions ===
| Level | Competition | Team |
|---|---|---|
| 1st level | Allsvenskan 1994 | IFK Göteborg |
| 2nd level | Division 1 Norra 1994 | Djurgårdens IF |
| 2nd level | Division 1 Södra 1994 | Örgryte IS |
| Cup | Svenska Cupen 1993–94 | Degerfors IF |

== Promotions, relegations and qualifications ==
=== Promotions ===
| Promoted from | Promoted to | Team | Reason |
|---|---|---|---|
| Division 1 Norra 1994 | Allsvenskan 1995 | Djurgårdens IF | Winners |
| Division 1 Södra 1994 | Allsvenskan 1995 | Örgryte IS | Winners |
| Division 2 1994 | Division 1 Norra 1995 | Assyriska Föreningen | Winners of Västra Svealand |
| Division 2 1994 | Division 1 Norra 1995 | Lira Luleå BK | Winners of Norrland |
| Division 2 1994 | Division 1 Norra 1995 | Väsby IK | Winners of Östra Svealand |
| Division 2 1994 | Division 1 Södra 1995 | Falkenbergs FF | Winners of Södra Götaland |
| Division 2 1994 | Division 1 Södra 1995 | Myresjö IF | Winners of Östra Götaland |
| Division 2 1994 | Division 1 Södra 1995 | Skövde AIK | Winners of Västra Götaland |
| Division 2 1994 | Division 1 Södra 1995 | Norrby IF | Winners of qualification play-off |

=== League transfers ===
| Transferred from | Transferred to | Team | Reason |
|---|---|---|---|
| Division 1 Södra 1994 | Division 1 Norra 1995 | BK Forward | Geographical composition |

=== Relegations ===
| Relegated from | Relegated to | Team | Reason |
|---|---|---|---|
| Allsvenskan 1994 | Division 1 Södra 1995 | Landskrona BoIS | 13th team |
| Allsvenskan 1994 | Division 1 Södra 1995 | BK Häcken | 14th team |
| Division 1 Norra 1994 | Division 2 1995 | Spånga IS | 12th team |
| Division 1 Norra 1994 | Division 2 1995 | Kiruna FF | 13th team |
| Division 1 Norra 1994 | Division 2 1995 | Spårvägens FF | 14th team |
| Division 1 Södra 1994 | Division 2 1995 | Jonsereds IF | Losers of qualification play-off |
| Division 1 Södra 1994 | Division 2 1995 | Karlskrona AIF | 12th team |
| Division 1 Södra 1994 | Division 2 1995 | IK Sleipner | 13th team |
| Division 1 Södra 1994 | Division 2 1995 | Lunds BK | 14th team |

=== International qualifications ===
| Qualified for | Enters | Team | Reason |
|---|---|---|---|
| UEFA Champions League 1995–96 | Qualifying round | IFK Göteborg | Winners of Allsvenskan |
| UEFA Cup 1995–96 | Preliminary round | Örebro SK | 2nd team in Allsvenskan |
| UEFA Cup 1995–96 | Preliminary round | Malmö FF | 3rd team in Allsvenskan |
| UEFA Cup Winners' Cup 1994–95 | Preliminary round | IFK Norrköping | Winners of Svenska Cupen |
| UEFA Intertoto Cup 1995 | Group stage | IFK Norrköping | 4th team in Allsvenskan |
| UEFA Intertoto Cup 1995 | Group stage | Östers IF | 5th team in Allsvenskan |

== Domestic results ==
=== Allsvenskan 1994 ===
| | Team | Pld | W | D | L | GF | | GA | GD | Pts |
|---|---|---|---|---|---|---|---|---|---|---|
| 1 | IFK Göteborg | 26 | 16 | 6 | 4 | 54 | – | 28 | +26 | 54 |
| 2 | Örebro SK | 26 | 15 | 7 | 4 | 62 | – | 30 | +32 | 52 |
| 3 | Malmö FF | 26 | 14 | 7 | 5 | 51 | – | 33 | +18 | 49 |
| 4 | IFK Norrköping | 26 | 13 | 8 | 5 | 52 | – | 22 | +30 | 47 |
| 5 | Östers IF | 26 | 13 | 6 | 7 | 48 | – | 30 | +18 | 45 |
| 6 | AIK | 26 | 11 | 6 | 9 | 42 | – | 41 | +1 | 39 |
| 7 | Halmstads BK | 26 | 10 | 8 | 8 | 41 | – | 39 | +2 | 38 |
| 8 | Degerfors IF | 26 | 8 | 8 | 10 | 28 | – | 37 | -9 | 32 |
| 9 | Helsingborgs IF | 26 | 9 | 5 | 12 | 30 | – | 46 | -16 | 32 |
| 10 | Trelleborgs FF | 26 | 7 | 9 | 10 | 25 | – | 40 | -15 | 30 |
| 11 | Västra Frölunda IF | 26 | 7 | 6 | 13 | 30 | – | 33 | -3 | 27 |
| 12 | Hammarby IF | 26 | 5 | 7 | 14 | 28 | – | 44 | -16 | 22 |
| 13 | Landskrona BoIS | 26 | 4 | 5 | 17 | 22 | – | 59 | -37 | 17 |
| 14 | BK Häcken | 26 | 2 | 8 | 16 | 27 | – | 58 | -31 | 14 |

=== Allsvenskan qualification play-off 1994 ===
October 30, 1994

| Västra Frölunda IF | 2–0 | Umeå FC |

?, Gothenburg
November 5, 1994

| Umeå FC | 0–0 | Västra Frölunda IF |

?, Umeå

October 29, 1994

| Kalmar FF | 1–4 | Hammarby IF |

?, Kalmar
November 5, 1994

| Hammarby IF | 2–2 | Kalmar FF |

?, Stockholm

=== Division 1 Norra 1994 ===
| | Team | Pld | W | D | L | GF | | GA | GD | Pts |
|---|---|---|---|---|---|---|---|---|---|---|
| 1 | Djurgårdens IF | 26 | 19 | 4 | 3 | 71 | – | 27 | +44 | 61 |
| 2 | Umeå FC | 26 | 15 | 2 | 9 | 55 | – | 33 | +22 | 47 |
| 3 | IFK Luleå | 26 | 12 | 9 | 5 | 44 | – | 30 | +14 | 45 |
| 4 | Vasalunds IF | 26 | 13 | 4 | 9 | 57 | – | 49 | +8 | 43 |
| 5 | Gefle IF | 26 | 12 | 5 | 9 | 38 | – | 28 | +10 | 41 |
| 6 | IK Brage | 26 | 12 | 4 | 10 | 41 | – | 34 | +7 | 40 |
| 7 | GIF Sundsvall | 26 | 10 | 3 | 13 | 35 | – | 47 | -12 | 33 |
| 8 | IF Brommapojkarna | 26 | 8 | 8 | 10 | 39 | – | 37 | +2 | 32 |
| 9 | IK Sirius | 26 | 8 | 8 | 10 | 35 | – | 45 | -10 | 32 |
| 10 | Västerås SK | 26 | 9 | 5 | 12 | 39 | – | 53 | -14 | 32 |
| 11 | Visby IF Gute | 26 | 8 | 7 | 11 | 37 | – | 47 | -10 | 31 |
| 12 | Spånga IS | 26 | 6 | 6 | 14 | 24 | – | 38 | -14 | 24 |
| 13 | Kiruna FF | 26 | 5 | 8 | 13 | 30 | – | 68 | -38 | 23 |
| 14 | Spårvägens FF | 26 | 5 | 7 | 14 | 43 | – | 52 | -9 | 22 |

=== Division 1 Södra 1994 ===
| | Team | Pld | W | D | L | GF | | GA | GD | Pts |
|---|---|---|---|---|---|---|---|---|---|---|
| 1 | Örgryte IS | 26 | 17 | 4 | 5 | 50 | – | 13 | +37 | 55 |
| 2 | Kalmar FF | 26 | 17 | 3 | 6 | 47 | – | 22 | +25 | 54 |
| 3 | IFK Hässleholm | 26 | 14 | 7 | 5 | 58 | – | 39 | +19 | 49 |
| 4 | IF Elfsborg | 26 | 14 | 4 | 8 | 45 | – | 32 | +13 | 46 |
| 5 | IK Oddevold | 26 | 13 | 4 | 9 | 56 | – | 41 | +15 | 43 |
| 6 | GAIS | 26 | 11 | 9 | 6 | 42 | – | 32 | +10 | 42 |
| 7 | Ljungskile SK | 26 | 11 | 3 | 12 | 40 | – | 35 | +5 | 36 |
| 8 | Gunnilse IS | 26 | 8 | 9 | 9 | 27 | – | 33 | -6 | 33 |
| 9 | Stenungsunds IF | 26 | 9 | 4 | 13 | 40 | – | 41 | -1 | 31 |
| 10 | BK Forward | 26 | 7 | 10 | 9 | 27 | – | 33 | -6 | 31 |
| 11 | Jonsereds IF | 26 | 8 | 3 | 15 | 35 | – | 53 | -18 | 27 |
| 12 | Karlskrona AIF | 26 | 7 | 5 | 14 | 28 | – | 55 | -27 | 26 |
| 13 | IK Sleipner | 26 | 7 | 3 | 16 | 36 | – | 71 | -35 | 24 |
| 14 | Lunds BK | 26 | 3 | 4 | 19 | 27 | – | 58 | -31 | 13 |

=== Division 1 qualification play-off 1994 ===
1st round

October 22, 1994

| Gällivare SK | 0–1 | Visby IF Gute |

?, ?
October 26, 1994

| Visby IF Gute | 5–0 | Gällivare SK |

?, ?

October 22, 1994

| Norrby IF | 3–1 | IFK Malmö |

?, ?
October 26, 1994

| IFK Malmö | 1–1 | Norrby IF |

?, ?

October 23, 1994

| Nacka FF | 0–3 | IF Sylvia |

?, ?
October 26, 1994

| IF Sylvia | 6–3 | Nacka FF |

?, ?

October 23, 1994

| Husqvarna FF | 1–1 | Jonsereds IF |

?, ?
October 26, 1994

| Jonsereds IF | 4–1 | Husqvarna FF |

?, ?

2nd round

October 30, 1994

| IF Sylvia | 1–0 | Visby IF Gute |

?, ?
November 6, 1994

| Visby IF Gute | 5–1 | IF Sylvia |

?, ?

October 30, 1994

| Norrby IF | 2–0 | Jonsereds IF |

?, ?
November 6, 1994

| Jonsereds IF | 2–2 | Norrby IF |

?, ?

=== Svenska Cupen 1993–94 ===
Final

May 12, 1994

| IFK Norrköping | 3–3 4–3 (agg) | Helsingborgs IF |

Gamla Ullevi, Gothenburg
