= 1994 Division 2 (Swedish football) =

Division 2
- Season: 1994
- Promoted: Assyriska Föreningen; Falkenbergs FF; Lira BK; Myresjö IF; Norrby IF; Skövde AIK; Väsby IK
- Relegated: 17 teams
- Matches: 792

The 1994 Swedish Division 2 season.

The following are the statistics of the Swedish football Division 2 for the 1994 season.

== League standings ==
=== Division 2 Norrland ===
Pos	Team	Pld	W	D	L	GF	GA	GD	Pts	Promotion or relegation
1	Lira BK (C)	22	14	7	1	42	16	+26	49	Promotion to Division 1
2	Gällivare	22	11	4	7	28	25	+3	37	Promotion Playoffs
3	Skellefteå AIK	22	11	3	8	48	31	+17	36	
4	Ope IF	22	11	3	8	31	23	+8	36	
5	Obbola IK	22	7	8	7	25	21	+4	29	
6	Matfors	22	7	8	7	24	25	−1	29	
7	Piteå IF	22	7	8	7	30	34	−4	29	
8	Morön	22	7	7	8	23	27	−4	28	
9	Gimonäs	22	6	8	8	25	26	−1	26	
10	Täfteå IK	22	6	8	8	24	34	−10	26	Relegation Playoffs
11	IFK Östersund (R)	22	5	7	10	27	35	−8	22	Relegation to Division 3
12	Alnön (R)	22	3	3	16	13	43	−30	12	Relegation to Division 3

Rules for classification: 1) points; 2) goal difference; 3) number of goals scored.
(C) Champions; (R) Relegated

=== Division 2 Östra Svealand ===
Pos	Team	Pld	W	D	L	GF	GA	GD	Pts	Promotion or relegation
1	Väsby IK (C)	22	15	6	1	43	14	+29	51	Promotion to Division 1
2	Nacka FF	22	15	1	6	45	25	+20	46	Promotion Playoffs
3	Norrtälje	22	11	6	5	41	28	+13	39	
4	Tyresö FF	22	9	6	7	28	29	−1	33	
5	Enköpings SK	22	9	4	9	35	40	−5	31	
6	Älvsjö	22	6	10	6	35	36	−1	28	
7	Gimo	22	8	4	10	44	46	−2	28	
8	Syrianska Föreningen	22	6	7	9	31	36	−5	25	
9	IFK Sundsvall	22	7	3	12	35	39	−4	24	
10	Helenelunds IK	22	7	3	12	37	48	−11	24	Relegation Playoffs
11	Sandvikens IF (R)	22	6	3	13	19	30	−11	21	Relegation to Division 3
12	IFK Stockholm (R)	22	4	5	13	26	48	−22	17	Relegation to Division 3

Rules for classification: 1) points; 2) goal difference; 3) number of goals scored.
(C) Champions; (R) Relegated

=== Division 2 Västra Svealand ===
Pos	Team	Pld	W	D	L	GF	GA	GD	Pts	Promotion or relegation
1	Assyriska Föreningen (C)	22	14	5	3	49	20	+29	47	Promotion to Division 1
2	IF Sylvia	22	14	4	4	44	22	+22	46	Promotion Playoffs
3	Hertzöga	22	11	2	9	39	34	+5	35	
4	Karlstad BK	22	10	4	8	37	30	+7	34	
5	IFK Eskilstuna	22	9	4	9	57	45	+12	31	
6	Karlslunds IF	22	9	2	11	36	40	−4	29	
7	IFK Västerås	22	8	5	9	31	36	−5	29	
8	Ludvika FK	22	7	6	9	31	30	+1	27	
9	City	22	7	6	9	36	47	−11	27	
10	Gideonsberg	22	8	3	11	38	53	−15	27	Relegation Playoffs
11	Skiljebo SK (R)	22	7	4	11	36	54	−18	25	Relegation to Division 3
12	Heby AIF (R)	22	3	5	14	22	45	−23	14	Relegation to Division 3

Rules for classification: 1) points; 2) goal difference; 3) number of goals scored.
(C) Champions; (R) Relegated

=== Division 2 Östra Götaland ===
Pos	Team	Pld	W	D	L	GF	GA	GD	Pts	Promotion or relegation
1	Myresjö IF (C)	22	14	6	2	45	17	+28	48	Promotion to Division 1
2	Husqvarna FF	22	12	6	4	37	15	+22	42	Promotion Playoffs
3	Motala AIF	22	13	3	6	37	22	+15	42	
4	Åtvidabergs FF	22	11	6	5	49	24	+25	39	
5	Linköping	22	10	4	8	39	26	+13	34	
6	Växjö Norra IF	22	8	8	6	35	21	+14	32	
7	IFK Värnamo	22	9	3	10	33	32	+1	30	
8	Grimsås	22	9	3	10	26	35	−9	30	
9	Kalmar AIK	22	8	2	12	30	30	0	26	
10	Växjö BK	22	5	4	13	23	40	−17	19	Relegation Playoffs
11	Nybro IF (R)	22	5	4	13	26	49	−23	19	Relegation to Division 3
12	Ramunder (R)	22	3	1	18	18	87	−69	10	Relegation to Division 3

Rules for classification: 1) points; 2) goal difference; 3) number of goals scored.
(C) Champions; (R) Relegated

=== Division 2 Västra Götaland ===
Pos	Team	Pld	W	D	L	GF	GA	GD	Pts	Promotion or relegation
1	Skövde AIK (C)	22	15	5	2	65	25	+40	50	Promotion to Division 1
2	Norrby IF (P)	22	15	3	4	54	19	+35	48	Promotion Playoffs
3	IFK Uddevalla	22	11	6	5	57	41	+16	39	
4	Tidaholms GIF	22	12	3	7	48	36	+12	39	
5	Ulvåkers IF	22	10	3	9	39	37	+2	33	
6	IF Heimer	22	9	4	9	34	34	0	31	
7	Kungsbacka BI	22	9	4	9	34	37	−3	31	
8	Holmalunds IF	22	9	3	10	42	40	+2	30	
9	Mellerud	22	8	5	9	45	45	0	29	
10	Trollhättans FK	22	5	6	11	34	52	−18	21	Relegation Playoffs
11	Varbergs BoIS (R)	22	5	4	13	31	55	−24	19	Relegation to Division 3
12	Bjurslätt (R)	22	0	2	20	10	69	−59	2	Relegation to Division 3

Rules for classification: 1) points; 2) goal difference; 3) number of goals scored.
(C) Champions; (P) Promoted; (R) Relegated

=== Division 2 Södra Götaland ===
Pos	Team	Pld	W	D	L	GF	GA	GD	Pts	Promotion or relegation
1	Falkenbergs FF (C)	22	13	6	3	43	20	+23	45	Promotion to Division 1
2	IFK Malmö	22	10	10	2	39	17	+22	40	Promotion Playoffs
3	Markaryd	22	11	6	5	46	25	+21	39	
4	IFK Karlshamn	22	12	3	7	47	35	+12	39	
5	Veberöds AIF	22	10	5	7	43	39	+4	35	
6	IFK Trelleborg	22	9	7	6	37	33	+4	34	
7	Kristianstads FF	22	8	2	12	27	32	−5	26	
8	IS Halmia	22	7	5	10	29	39	−10	26	
9	Mjällby AIF	22	7	4	11	19	22	−3	25	
10	IF Leikin	22	7	4	11	38	54	−16	25	Relegation Playoffs
11	Vinbergs IF (R)	22	5	3	14	24	46	−22	18	Relegation to Division 3
12	Åhus Horna (R)	22	5	1	16	25	55	−30	16	Relegation to Division 3

Rules for classification: 1) points; 2) goal difference; 3) number of goals scored.
(C) Champions; (R) Relegated

=== Division 1 qualification play-off ===
1st round

October 22, 1994

Gällivare SK	0–1	Visby IF Gute

?, ?
October 26, 1994

Visby IF Gute	5–0	Gällivare SK

?, ?

October 22, 1994

Norrby IF	3–1	IFK Malmö

?, ?
October 26, 1994

IFK Malmö	1–1	Norrby IF

?, ?

October 23, 1994

Nacka FF	0–3	IF Sylvia

?, ?
October 26, 1994

IF Sylvia	6–3	Nacka FF

?, ?

October 23, 1994

Husqvarna FF	1–1	Jonsereds IF

?, ?
October 26, 1994

Jonsereds IF	4–1	Husqvarna FF

?, ?

2nd round

October 30, 1994

IF Sylvia	1–0	Visby IF Gute

?, ?
November 6, 1994

Visby IF Gute	5–1	IF Sylvia

?, ?

October 30, 1994

Norrby IF	2–0	Jonsereds IF

?, ?
November 6, 1994

Jonsereds IF	2–2	Norrby IF

?, ?
