= 1999 in Swedish football =

The 1999 season in Swedish football, starting January 1999 and ending December 1999:

== Honours ==
=== Official titles ===
Title	Team	Reason
Swedish Champions 1999	Helsingborgs IF	Winners of Allsvenskan
Swedish Cup Champions 1998–99	AIK	Winners of Svenska Cupen

=== Competitions ===
Level	Competition	Team
1st level	Allsvenskan 1999	Helsingborgs IF
2nd level	Division 1 Norra 1999	GIF Sundsvall
2nd level	Division 1 Södra 1999	BK Häcken
Cup	Svenska Cupen 1998–99	AIK

== Promotions, relegations and qualifications ==
=== Promotions ===
Promoted from	Promoted to	Team	Reason
Division 1 Norra 1999	Allsvenskan 2000	GIF Sundsvall	Winners
Division 1 Södra 1999	Allsvenskan 2000	BK Häcken	Winners
Division 1 Södra 1999	Allsvenskan 2000	GAIS	Winners of qualification play-off
Division 2 1999	Superettan 2000	FC Café Opera Djursholm	Winners of qualification play-off

=== League transfers ===
Transferred from	Transferred to	Team	Reason
Division 1 Norra 1999	Superettan 2000	Assyriska Föreningen	Losers of qualification play-off
Division 1 Norra 1999	Superettan 2000	IF Sylvia	3rd team
Division 1 Norra 1999	Superettan 2000	Enköpings SK	4th team
Division 1 Norra 1999	Superettan 2000	IK Brage	5th team
Division 1 Norra 1999	Superettan 2000	Västerås SK	6th team
Division 1 Norra 1999	Superettan 2000	Umeå FC	7th team
Division 1 Södra 1999	Superettan 2000	Mjällby AIF	3rd team
Division 1 Södra 1999	Superettan 2000	Ljungskile SK	4th team
Division 1 Södra 1999	Superettan 2000	Landskrona BoIS	5th team
Division 1 Södra 1999	Superettan 2000	Gunnilse IS	6th team
Division 1 Södra 1999	Superettan 2000	Åtvidabergs FF	7th team
Division 1 Södra 1999	Superettan 2000	Östers IF	Winners of qualification play-off

=== Relegations ===
Relegated from	Relegated to	Team	Reason
Allsvenskan 1999	Superettan 2000	Kalmar FF	Losers of qualification play-off
Allsvenskan 1999	Superettan 2000	Malmö FF	13th team
Allsvenskan 1999	Superettan 2000	Djurgårdens IF	14th team
Division 1 Norra 1999	Division 2 2000	Gefle IF	Losers of qualification play-off
Division 1 Norra 1999	Division 2 2000	Degerfors IF	9th team
Division 1 Norra 1999	Division 2 2000	IF Brommapojkarna	10th team
Division 1 Norra 1999	Division 2 2000	Nacka FF	11th team
Division 1 Norra 1999	Division 2 2000	Lira Luleå BK	12th team
Division 1 Norra 1999	Division 2 2000	IK Sirius	13th team
Division 1 Norra 1999	Division 2 2000	Spårvägens FF	14th team
Division 1 Södra 1999	Division 2 2000	Kristianstads FF	9th team
Division 1 Södra 1999	Division 2 2000	IK Kongahälla	10th team
Division 1 Södra 1999	Division 2 2000	Husqvarna FF	11th team
Division 1 Södra 1999	Division 2 2000	Falkenbergs FF	12th team
Division 1 Södra 1999	Division 2 2000	Motala AIF	13th team
Division 1 Södra 1999	Division 2 2000	Stenungsunds IF	14th team

=== International qualifications ===
Qualified for	Enters	Team	Reason
UEFA Champions League 2000–01	2nd qualifying round	Helsingborgs IF	Winners of Allsvenskan
UEFA Cup 2000–01	Qualifying round	AIK	2nd team in Allsvenskan
UEFA Cup 2000–01	Qualifying round	Halmstads BK	3rd team in Allsvenskan
UEFA Cup 2000–01	Qualifying round	IFK Norrköping	UEFA Fair Play winners
UEFA Cup 1999–2000	Qualifying round	IFK Göteborg	Runners-up of Svenska Cupen
UEFA Intertoto Cup 2000	1st round	Västra Frölunda IF	Unknown

== Domestic results ==
=== Allsvenskan 1999 ===
	Team	Pld	W	D	L	GF		GA	GD	Pts
1	Helsingborgs IF	26	17	3	6	44	–	24	+20	54
2	AIK	26	16	5	5	42	–	14	+28	53
3	Halmstads BK	26	14	6	6	43	–	22	+21	48
4	Örgryte IS	26	11	10	5	41	–	23	+18	43
5	IFK Norrköping	26	11	6	9	41	–	36	+5	39
6	IFK Göteborg	26	11	5	10	27	–	33	-6	38
7	Västra Frölunda IF	26	9	7	10	30	–	33	-3	34
8	Trelleborgs FF	26	9	6	11	39	–	47	-8	33
9	IF Elfsborg	26	9	5	12	41	–	48	-7	32
10	Hammarby IF	26	8	5	13	32	–	42	-10	29
11	Kalmar FF	26	8	4	14	27	–	41	-14	28
12	Örebro SK	26	8	3	15	24	–	36	-12	27
13	Malmö FF	26	7	4	15	30	–	48	-18	25
14	Djurgårdens IF	26	5	9	12	27	–	41	-14	24

=== Allsvenskan qualification play-off 1999 ===
November 3, 1999

Assyriska Föreningen	1–1	Örebro SK

?, Södertälje
November 6, 1999

Örebro SK	1–1 2–1 (aet)	Assyriska Föreningen

?, Örebro

November 3, 1999

GAIS	2–1	Kalmar FF

?, Gothenburg
November 6, 1999

Kalmar FF	1–1	GAIS

?, Kalmar

=== Division 1 Norra 1999 ===
	Team	Pld	W	D	L	GF		GA	GD	Pts
1	GIF Sundsvall	26	13	9	4	65	–	32	+33	48
2	Assyriska Föreningen	26	14	5	7	44	–	25	+19	47
3	IF Sylvia	26	15	2	9	47	–	33	+14	47
4	Enköpings SK	26	13	6	7	40	–	26	+14	45
5	IK Brage	26	12	3	11	33	–	26	+7	39
6	Västerås SK	26	10	7	9	32	–	24	+8	37
7	Umeå FC	26	9	9	8	32	–	28	+4	36
8	Gefle IF	26	10	6	10	32	–	38	-6	36
9	Degerfors IF	26	9	8	9	34	–	36	-2	35
10	IF Brommapojkarna	26	9	4	13	31	–	42	-11	31
11	Nacka FF	26	8	7	11	28	–	39	-11	31
12	Lira Luleå BK	26	8	4	14	31	–	45	-14	28
13	IK Sirius	26	6	7	13	27	–	52	-25	25
14	Spårvägens FF	26	6	3	17	18	–	48	-30	21

=== Division 1 Södra 1999 ===
	Team	Pld	W	D	L	GF		GA	GD	Pts
1	BK Häcken	26	15	6	5	62	–	28	+34	51
2	GAIS	26	14	7	5	35	–	27	+8	49
3	Mjällby AIF	26	15	2	9	51	–	33	+18	47
4	Ljungskile SK	26	13	7	6	38	–	26	+12	46
5	Landskrona BoIS	26	12	9	5	52	–	30	+22	45
6	Gunnilse IS	26	12	6	8	39	–	30	+9	42
7	Åtvidabergs FF	26	11	8	7	38	–	32	+6	41
8	Östers IF	26	11	6	9	32	–	30	+2	39
9	Kristianstads FF	26	9	4	13	34	–	46	-12	31
10	IK Kongahälla	26	7	7	12	31	–	40	-9	28
11	Husqvarna FF	26	8	3	15	32	–	50	-18	27
12	Falkenbergs FF	26	8	2	16	36	–	59	-23	26
13	Motala AIF	26	7	2	17	28	–	47	-19	23
14	Stenungsunds IF	26	4	3	19	28	–	58	-30	15

=== Superettan qualification play-off 1999 ===
1st round, 1st group

	Team	Pld	W	D	L	GF		GA	GD	Pts
1	FC Café Opera Djursholm	4	4	0	0	8	–	2	+6	12
2	Väsby IK	3	1	0	2	3	–	4	-1	3
3	Östersunds FK	3	0	0	3	2	–	7	-5	0

1st round, 2nd group

	Team	Pld	W	D	L	GF		GA	GD	Pts
1	Ljungby IF	3	2	1	0	9	–	6	+3	7
2	Norrby IF	4	1	2	1	6	–	7	-1	5
3	Lunds BK	3	0	1	2	3	–	5	-2	1

2nd round

October 27, 1999

FC Café Opera Djursholm	0–0	Gefle IF

?, ?
October 31, 1999

Gefle IF	2–2 (ag)	FC Café Opera Djursholm

?, ?

October 27, 1999

Ljungby IF	1–1	Östers IF

?, ?
October 30, 1999

Östers IF	2–1	Ljungby IF

?, ?

=== Svenska Cupen 1998–99 ===
Final

May 14, 1999

AIK	1–0	IFK Göteborg

Råsunda, Solna
May 20, 1999

IFK Göteborg	0–0	AIK

Ullevi, Gothenburg
