= Jerry Månsson =

Swedish footballer (born 1972)

Personal information
- Full name: Max Jerry Månsson
- Date of birth: 1 February 1972 (age 54)
- Height: 1.74 m (5 ft 9 in)
- Position: Striker

Youth career
- Brommapojkarna

Senior career*
| Years | Team | Apps | (Gls) |
| 1990–1996 | Brommapojkarna | | |
| 1997 | Viking | 25 | (8) |
| 1998–2000 | Moss | 56 | (15) |
| 2001 | Assyriska | | |
| 2001–2002 | Café Opera | | |
| 2003–2004 | Brommapojkarna | | |
- * Club domestic league appearances and goals

Jerry Månsson (born 1 February 1972) is a Swedish retired footballer who played as a striker. Never playing in the Allsvenskan, he spent four seasons in the Norwegian Eliteserien. He also became known for an unusual goal celebration, hairstyle and jersey number as well as for his social life.

== Career ==
Hailing from Stockholm, Månsson spent his entire early career in IF Brommapojkarna, up until the 1996 Division 1. With one year left of his contract, transfer bids were placed by IFK Norrköping and Viking FK. Viking based their bid exclusively on reports and had not scouted the player. Månsson learnt about Viking from Kjell Jonevret.

Viking signed Månsson in December 1996 for a price of 800,000 kr, a club record expenditure according to the local press. He started the 1997 pre-season by winning Viking's internal 40 metre-dash test, sprinting 0.06 seconds faster than the runner-up. Considering Månsson's below-average height, he expressed the desire to play as a striker alongside a target man in the 4-4-2 formation.

Månsson's first Viking goals came in June 1997, as he scored twice in a 4–2 victory over Bodø/Glimt. He then showed off his trademark goalscoring celebration, doing the somersault, as he had done during pre-season friendlies.

Among his notable performances for Viking was a hat-trick in the 4–0 victory over Skeid. At the same time, when Viking let Erik Nevland go to Manchester United, the club was on the lookout for a new forward. Despite being top goalscorer of Viking in 1997,

Månsson was asked to find another club after the 1997 season. In the media parlance of the day, the club "sacked" him. Several Viking teammates stated that Månsson should at least have been retained for one more year. After the news became public, Månsson scored in the league match against Bodø/Glimt, but was nonetheless criticized by the manager for "lacking timing" in that match.

Reportedly, there was transfer interest from Moss FK, Strømsgodset IF who could use him as a second striker, and a club from Łódź. Månsson stayed in Norway as he signed for Moss FK, the transfer sum being 500,000 kr. (Note: Jerry Månsson at the Norwegian Football Federation (in Norwegian)) He became the club's top goalscorer in his first season there, with 7 goals.

The team reached the semi-final of the 1998 Norwegian Football Cup. In that match, the local newspaper praised Månsson's performance, except he did not score. Following a 0–0 match, Moss lost on penalty shootout and thus missed out on the cup final.

Around New Year 1999, Månsson was allowed to visit Everton, training with their reserves. He left Moss after the 2000 season, returning to Sweden. In 2001 and 2002 he played for Assyriska FF and FC Café Opera, before returning to Brommapojkarna. (Note: Jerry Månsson at WorldFootball.net) He was in contention for the top goalscorer title of the 2004 Superettan.

== Personal life ==
During his early career in Sweden, Månsson also worked outside of football as a restaurant cook. He practiced and participated in amateur wrestling.

In 1995, Månsson was found guilty of doping after amphetamine was found in his body. Claiming that someone must have slipped the substance in his drink during a night out on the town, Månsson was acquitted by Riksidrottsnämnden in 1996.

Månsson became known in Norway for an urban, extrovert and flashy image. Stating that looks were "extremely important" to him, Månsson became known for dyed hair, an eyebrow piercing and a generally boisterous style. He did not want to be "a grey person, like everyone else", nor to resemble "a member in a dansband" with his looks. While living in Moss, Norway, he likened the city to a Saab car, compared with his city of origin being a Porsche, and stated that rumours sprung up more easily in such a location. He was also noted for playing with jersey number 99, which was unprecedented in Norway at the time.

Månsson befriended an author from Moss, Ari Behn. When Behn married then-Princess Märtha Louise in 2002, Månsson attended the wedding.

In March 1999, Månsson was convicted for assault. The assault took place at the bar Taket in Stavanger, receiving a suspended sentence of 90 days in prison as well as a fine of 10,000 kr. Månsson categorically denied having hit the bar patron.

Månsson settled in Stockholm with a wife and three children, managing an IT company.
