= 1995 in Swedish football =

The 1995 season in Swedish football, starting January 1995 and ending December 1995:

== Honours ==
=== Official titles ===
Title	Team	Reason
Swedish Champions 1995	IFK Göteborg	Winners of Allsvenskan
Swedish Cup Champions 1994–95	Halmstads BK	Winners of Svenska Cupen

=== Competitions ===
Level	Competition	Team
1st level	Allsvenskan 1995	IFK Göteborg
2nd level	Division 1 Norra 1995	Umeå FC
2nd level	Division 1 Södra 1995	IK Oddevold
Cup	Svenska Cupen 1994–95	Halmstads BK

== Promotions, relegations and qualifications ==
=== Promotions ===
Promoted from	Promoted to	Team	Reason
Division 1 Norra 1995	Allsvenskan 1996	Umeå FC	Winners
Division 1 Södra 1995	Allsvenskan 1996	IK Oddevold	Winners
Division 2 1995	Division 1 Norra 1996	Gimonäs CK	Winners of Norrland
Division 2 1995	Division 1 Norra 1996	Hertzöga BK	Winners of Västra Svealand
Division 2 1995	Division 1 Norra 1996	Spårvägens FF	Winners of Östra Svealand
Division 2 1995	Division 1 Södra 1996	Lundby IF	Winners of Västra Götaland
Division 2 1995	Division 1 Södra 1996	Mjällby AIF	Winners of Södra Götaland
Division 2 1995	Division 1 Södra 1996	Åtvidabergs FF	Winners of Östra Götaland
Division 2 1995	Division 1 Södra 1996	Motala AIF	Winners of qualification play-off

=== Relegations ===
Relegated from	Relegated to	Team	Reason
Allsvenskan 1995	Division 1 Norra 1996	Hammarby IF	13th team
Allsvenskan 1995	Division 1 Södra 1996	Västra Frölunda IF	14th team
Division 1 Norra 1995	Division 2 1996	Assyriska Föreningen	12th team
Division 1 Norra 1995	Division 2 1996	Väsby IK	13th team
Division 1 Norra 1995	Division 2 1996	Lira Luleå BK	14th team
Division 1 Södra 1995	Division 2 1996	Norrby IF	Losers of qualification play-off
Division 1 Södra 1995	Division 2 1996	Myresjö IF	12th team
Division 1 Södra 1995	Division 2 1996	Skövde AIK	13th team
Division 1 Södra 1995	Division 2 1996	Landskrona BoIS	14th team

=== International qualifications ===
Qualified for	Enters	Team	Reason
UEFA Champions League 1996–97	Qualifying round	IFK Göteborg	Winners of Allsvenskan
UEFA Cup 1996–97	Qualifying round	Helsingborgs IF	2nd team in Allsvenskan
UEFA Cup 1996–97	Qualifying round	Halmstads BK	3rd team in Allsvenskan
UEFA Cup 1996–97	Qualifying round	Malmö FF	4th team in Allsvenskan
UEFA Cup Winners' Cup 1995–96	1st round	Halmstads BK	Winners of Svenska Cupen
UEFA Intertoto Cup 1996	Group stage	Örebro SK	5th team in Allsvenskan
UEFA Intertoto Cup 1996	Group stage	Djurgårdens IF	6th team in Allsvenskan
UEFA Intertoto Cup 1996	Group stage	Örgryte IS	7th team in Allsvenskan

== Domestic results ==
=== Allsvenskan 1995 ===
	Team	Pld	W	D	L	GF		GA	GD	Pts
1	IFK Göteborg	26	12	10	4	43	–	20	+23	46
2	Helsingborgs IF	26	12	6	8	42	–	36	+6	42
3	Halmstads BK	26	11	8	7	41	–	32	+9	41
4	Malmö FF	26	9	12	5	32	–	28	+4	39
5	Örebro SK	26	10	8	8	35	–	29	+6	38
6	Djurgårdens IF	26	10	8	8	33	–	33	0	38
7	Örgryte IS	26	9	8	9	22	–	26	-4	35
8	AIK	26	7	11	8	34	–	34	0	32
9	Degerfors IF	26	7	11	8	32	–	45	-13	32
10	Trelleborgs FF	26	7	10	9	32	–	30	+2	31
11	Östers IF	26	5	13	8	41	–	41	0	28
12	IFK Norrköping	26	7	7	12	28	–	44	-16	28
13	Hammarby IF	26	6	8	12	33	–	40	-7	26
14	Västra Frölunda IF	26	5	10	11	35	–	45	-10	25

=== Allsvenskan qualification play-off 1995 ===
November 8, 1995

Gefle IF	0–1	Östers IF

?, Solna
November 12, 1995

Östers IF	3–0	Gefle IF

?, Växjö

November 5, 1995

GAIS	1–1	IFK Norrköping

?, Gothenburg
November 12, 1995

IFK Norrköping	1–0	GAIS

?, Norrköping

=== Division 1 Norra 1995 ===
	Team	Pld	W	D	L	GF		GA	GD	Pts
1	Umeå FC	26	13	9	4	41	–	22	+19	48
2	Gefle IF	26	12	9	5	49	–	26	+23	45
3	Vasalunds IF	26	11	11	4	46	–	28	+18	44
4	Visby IF Gute	26	11	7	8	45	–	52	-7	40
5	IK Brage	26	11	6	9	50	–	44	+6	39
6	IFK Luleå	26	9	9	8	45	–	38	+7	36
7	GIF Sundsvall	26	8	10	8	31	–	23	+8	34
8	IF Brommapojkarna	26	9	7	10	39	–	23	+16	34
9	Västerås SK	26	9	7	10	35	–	36	-1	34
10	BK Forward	26	8	10	8	28	–	34	-6	34
11	IK Sirius	26	7	8	11	29	–	41	-12	29
12	Assyriska Föreningen	26	6	7	13	24	–	41	-17	25
13	Väsby IK	26	4	12	10	23	–	40	-17	24
14	Lira Luleå BK	26	4	8	14	25	–	53	-28	20

=== Division 1 Södra 1995 ===
	Team	Pld	W	D	L	GF		GA	GD	Pts
1	IK Oddevold	26	17	3	6	59	–	29	+30	54
2	GAIS	26	13	9	4	55	–	35	+20	48
3	IF Elfsborg	26	14	5	7	55	–	40	+15	47
4	Kalmar FF	26	12	6	8	60	–	45	+15	42
5	Ljungskile SK	26	10	9	7	42	–	35	+7	39
6	Gunnilse IS	26	9	7	10	40	–	36	+4	34
7	BK Häcken	26	8	10	8	42	–	47	-5	34
8	IFK Hässleholm	26	10	4	12	48	–	65	-17	34
9	Falkenbergs FF	26	9	6	11	35	–	36	-1	33
10	Stenungsunds IF	26	7	11	8	31	–	33	-2	32
11	Norrby IF	26	9	4	13	37	–	40	-3	31
12	Myresjö IF	26	8	6	12	37	–	50	-13	30
13	Skövde AIK	26	6	5	15	43	–	58	-15	23
14	Landskrona BoIS	26	7	1	18	31	–	66	-35	22

=== Division 1 qualification play-off 1995 ===
1st round

October 28, 1995

Motala AIF	2–2	Norrby IF

?, ?
November 1, 1995

Norrby IF	1–2	Motala AIF

?, ?

October 28, 1995

IFK Sundsvall	0–1	IK Sirius

?, ?
November 1, 1995

IK Sirius	1–1	IFK Sundsvall

?, ?

October 29, 1995

Tyresö FF	0–2	IFK Västerås

?, ?
November 1, 1995

IFK Västerås	0–1	Tyresö FF

?, ?

October 29, 1995

Qviding FIF	2–1	IFK Trelleborg

?, ?
November 1, 1995

IFK Trelleborg	3–0	Qviding FIF

?, ?

2nd round

November 5, 1995

IFK Trelleborg	2–2	Motala AIF

?, ?
November 11, 1995

Motala AIF	(ag) 1–1	IFK Trelleborg

?, ?

November 8, 1995

IFK Västerås	0–2	IK Sirius

?, ?
November 11, 1995

IK Sirius	3–0	IFK Västerås

?, ?

=== Svenska Cupen 1994–95 ===
Final

May 25, 1995

Halmstads BK	3–1	AIK

Gamla Ullevi, Gothenburg
