= 1998 Division 2 (Swedish football) =

Swedish football league season

Statistics of Swedish football Division 2 in season 1998.

== League standings ==
=== Division 2 Norrland ===
| Pos | Team | Pld | W | D | L | GF | GA | GD | Pts | Promotion or relegation |
|---|---|---|---|---|---|---|---|---|---|---|
| 1 | Lira BK (P) | 22 | 12 | 6 | 4 | 45 | 19 | +26 | 42 | Promotion to Division 1 |
| 2 | Östersunds FK | 22 | 11 | 6 | 5 | 33 | 20 | +13 | 39 | Promotion Playoffs |
| 3 | Selånger FK | 22 | 10 | 8 | 4 | 38 | 26 | +12 | 38 | |
| 4 | Skellefteå AIK | 22 | 11 | 4 | 7 | 36 | 30 | +6 | 37 | |
| 5 | IFK Holmsund | 22 | 9 | 8 | 5 | 45 | 34 | +11 | 35 | |
| 6 | Hudiksvall | 22 | 9 | 6 | 7 | 45 | 40 | +5 | 33 | |
| 7 | Kiruna | 22 | 9 | 5 | 8 | 39 | 33 | +6 | 32 | |
| 8 | Gällivare | 22 | 10 | 0 | 12 | 33 | 51 | −18 | 30 | |
| 9 | Assi | 22 | 7 | 6 | 9 | 24 | 29 | −5 | 27 | |
| 10 | Morön | 22 | 6 | 5 | 11 | 30 | 43 | −13 | 23 | Division 3 Relegation Playoffs |
| 11 | Täfteå IK (R) | 22 | 6 | 3 | 13 | 21 | 41 | −20 | 21 | Relegation to Division 3 |
| 12 | Gimonäs (R) | 22 | 2 | 3 | 17 | 22 | 45 | −23 | 9 | Relegation to Division 3 |

Rules for classification: 1) points; 2) goal difference; 3) number of goals scored.
(P) Promoted; (R) Relegated

=== Division 2 Östra Svealand ===
| Pos | Team | Pld | W | D | L | GF | GA | GD | Pts | Promotion or relegation |
|---|---|---|---|---|---|---|---|---|---|---|
| 1 | IF Brommapojkarna (P) | 22 | 15 | 5 | 2 | 64 | 15 | +49 | 50 | Promotion to Division 1 |
| 2 | Väsby IK | 22 | 14 | 5 | 3 | 44 | 14 | +30 | 47 | Promotion Playoffs |
| 3 | Café Opera United | 22 | 12 | 9 | 1 | 41 | 17 | +24 | 45 | |
| 4 | Vasalunds IF | 22 | 10 | 6 | 6 | 54 | 25 | +29 | 36 | |
| 5 | Sandvikens IF | 22 | 10 | 6 | 6 | 45 | 34 | +11 | 36 | |
| 6 | Söderhamn | 22 | 8 | 6 | 8 | 39 | 32 | +7 | 30 | |
| 7 | Visby IF Gute | 22 | 9 | 3 | 10 | 40 | 36 | +4 | 30 | |
| 8 | Håbo | 22 | 6 | 7 | 9 | 43 | 41 | +2 | 25 | |
| 9 | Vallentuna | 22 | 6 | 7 | 9 | 45 | 45 | 0 | 25 | |
| 10 | IFK Gävle | 22 | 7 | 4 | 11 | 33 | 42 | −9 | 25 | Division 3 Relegation Playoffs |
| 11 | Älvsjö (R) | 22 | 3 | 4 | 15 | 21 | 46 | −25 | 13 | Relegation to Division 3 |
| 12 | Plavi Team/Stockholm (R) | 22 | 0 | 2 | 20 | 7 | 129 | −122 | 2 | Relegation to Division 3 |

Rules for classification: 1) points; 2) goal difference; 3) number of goals scored.
(P) Promoted; (R) Relegated

=== Division 2 Västra Svealand ===
| Pos | Team | Pld | W | D | L | GF | GA | GD | Pts | Promotion or relegation |
|---|---|---|---|---|---|---|---|---|---|---|
| 1 | Enköpings SK (P) | 22 | 15 | 4 | 3 | 39 | 18 | +21 | 49 | Promotion to Division 1 |
| 2 | Tyresö FF | 22 | 14 | 4 | 4 | 44 | 22 | +22 | 46 | Promotion Playoffs |
| 3 | BK Forward | 22 | 13 | 4 | 5 | 45 | 25 | +20 | 43 | |
| 4 | Hertzöga | 22 | 11 | 7 | 4 | 30 | 16 | +14 | 40 | |
| 5 | Spånga | 22 | 9 | 8 | 5 | 34 | 27 | +7 | 35 | |
| 6 | City | 22 | 11 | 1 | 10 | 41 | 34 | +7 | 34 | |
| 7 | IFK Eskilstuna | 22 | 9 | 5 | 8 | 39 | 29 | +10 | 32 | |
| 8 | Värtan | 22 | 7 | 5 | 10 | 28 | 43 | −15 | 26 | |
| 9 | Rynninge | 22 | 6 | 5 | 11 | 26 | 32 | −6 | 23 | |
| 10 | IFK Västerås | 22 | 5 | 3 | 14 | 25 | 45 | −20 | 18 | Division 3 Relegation Playoffs |
| 11 | Karlstad BK (R) | 22 | 5 | 1 | 16 | 21 | 53 | −32 | 16 | Relegation to Division 3 |
| 12 | Enebyberg (R) | 22 | 2 | 3 | 17 | 19 | 47 | −28 | 9 | Relegation to Division 3 |

Rules for classification: 1) points; 2) goal difference; 3) number of goals scored.
(P) Promoted; (R) Relegated

=== Division 2 Östra Götaland ===
| Pos | Team | Pld | W | D | L | GF | GA | GD | Pts | Promotion or relegation |
|---|---|---|---|---|---|---|---|---|---|---|
| 1 | Husqvarna FF (P) | 22 | 17 | 3 | 2 | 52 | 26 | +26 | 54 | Promotion to Division 1 |
| 2 | Myresjö IF | 22 | 14 | 3 | 5 | 43 | 25 | +18 | 45 | Promotion Playoffs |
| 3 | Nybro IF | 22 | 12 | 5 | 5 | 47 | 25 | +22 | 41 | |
| 4 | Linköping | 22 | 9 | 6 | 7 | 41 | 35 | +6 | 33 | |
| 5 | Kalmar AIK | 22 | 8 | 5 | 9 | 27 | 31 | −4 | 29 | |
| 6 | Grimsås | 22 | 8 | 5 | 9 | 40 | 42 | −2 | 29 | |
| 7 | Växjö Norra IF | 22 | 7 | 7 | 8 | 27 | 27 | 0 | 28 | |
| 8 | Gullringen | 22 | 7 | 5 | 10 | 28 | 34 | −6 | 26 | |
| 9 | Tord | 22 | 7 | 4 | 11 | 20 | 42 | −22 | 25 | |
| 10 | Hjulsbro | 22 | 5 | 7 | 10 | 27 | 32 | −5 | 22 | Division 3 Relegation Playoffs |
| 11 | Nyköpings BIS (R) | 22 | 3 | 8 | 11 | 32 | 52 | −20 | 17 | Relegation to Division 3 |
| 12 | IFK Värnamo (R) | 22 | 2 | 8 | 12 | 24 | 47 | −23 | 14 | Relegation to Division 3 |

Rules for classification: 1) points; 2) goal difference; 3) number of goals scored.
(P) Promoted; (R) Relegated

=== Division 2 Västra Götaland ===
| Pos | Team | Pld | W | D | L | GF | GA | GD | Pts | Promotion or relegation |
|---|---|---|---|---|---|---|---|---|---|---|
| 1 | GAIS (P) | 22 | 14 | 3 | 5 | 46 | 33 | +13 | 45 | Promotion to Division 1 |
| 2 | Kongahälla | 22 | 11 | 6 | 5 | 46 | 36 | +10 | 39 | Promotion Playoffs |
| 3 | Torslanda IK | 22 | 11 | 5 | 6 | 32 | 25 | +7 | 38 | |
| 4 | Holmalunds IF | 22 | 9 | 6 | 7 | 32 | 26 | +6 | 33 | |
| 5 | Qviding FIF | 22 | 8 | 7 | 7 | 35 | 35 | 0 | 31 | |
| 6 | Trollhättans FK | 22 | 7 | 7 | 8 | 42 | 38 | +4 | 28 | |
| 7 | IK Oddevold | 22 | 8 | 4 | 10 | 35 | 42 | −7 | 28 | |
| 8 | Skövde AIK | 22 | 7 | 7 | 8 | 31 | 39 | −8 | 28 | |
| 9 | IF Heimer | 22 | 6 | 7 | 9 | 41 | 31 | +10 | 25 | |
| 10 | Jonsered | 22 | 6 | 7 | 9 | 24 | 36 | −12 | 25 | Division 3 Relegation Playoffs |
| 11 | IFK Fjärås (R) | 22 | 6 | 4 | 12 | 32 | 40 | −8 | 22 | Relegation to Division 3 |
| 12 | Åsa (R) | 22 | 4 | 7 | 11 | 29 | 44 | −15 | 19 | Relegation to Division 3 |

Rules for classification: 1) points; 2) goal difference; 3) number of goals scored.
(P) Promoted; (R) Relegated

=== Division 2 Södra Götaland ===
| Pos | Team | Pld | W | D | L | GF | GA | GD | Pts | Promotion or relegation |
|---|---|---|---|---|---|---|---|---|---|---|
| 1 | Kristianstads FF (P) | 22 | 14 | 3 | 5 | 44 | 27 | +17 | 45 | Promotion to Division 1 |
| 2 | IFK Malmö | 22 | 13 | 3 | 6 | 48 | 30 | +18 | 42 | Promotion Playoffs |
| 3 | Olofström | 22 | 11 | 9 | 2 | 38 | 23 | +15 | 42 | |
| 4 | IFK Trelleborg | 22 | 10 | 5 | 7 | 36 | 30 | +6 | 35 | |
| 5 | Laholm | 22 | 9 | 3 | 10 | 30 | 34 | −4 | 30 | |
| 6 | Åhus Horna | 22 | 9 | 3 | 10 | 29 | 33 | −4 | 30 | |
| 7 | Ystad | 22 | 6 | 10 | 6 | 33 | 31 | +2 | 28 | |
| 8 | Skene | 22 | 7 | 5 | 10 | 30 | 29 | +1 | 26 | |
| 9 | Lunds BK | 22 | 6 | 5 | 11 | 27 | 32 | −5 | 23 | |
| 10 | Högaborg | 22 | 7 | 2 | 13 | 26 | 40 | −14 | 23 | Division 3 Relegation Playoffs |
| 11 | Olympic (R) | 22 | 6 | 5 | 11 | 28 | 48 | −20 | 23 | Relegation to Division 3 |
| 12 | Vinbergs IF (R) | 22 | 6 | 3 | 13 | 25 | 37 | −12 | 21 | Relegation to Division 3 |

Rules for classification: 1) points; 2) goal difference; 3) number of goals scored.
(P) Promoted; (R) Relegated
