= Värtans IK =

Swedish football club

- Full name: Värtans Idrottsklubb
- Founded: 1924; 101 years ago
- Ground: Hjorthagens IP; Stockholm; Sweden
- Chairman: Inge Lindström
- 2019: Division 3 Norra Svealand, 4th
Home colours	Away colours

Värtans IK is a Swedish football club located in Stockholm. The club was formed in 1924.

== Background ==
Since their foundation Värtans IK has participated in the upper and lower divisions of the Swedish football league system. The club currently plays in Division 5 Stockholm Mellersta which is the seventh tier of Swedish football. They play their home matches at the Hjorthagens IP in Stockholm.

Värtans IK are affiliated to the Stockholms Fotbollförbund.

== Season to season ==
In their early history Värtans IK competed in the following divisions:

Season	Level	Division	Section	Position	Movements
1934–35	Tier 3	Division 3	Östsvenska	1st	Promoted
1935–36	Tier 2	Division 2	Östra	3rd	
1936–37	Tier 2	Division 2	Östra	7th	
1937–38	Tier 2	Division 2	Norra	3rd	
1938–39	Tier 2	Division 2	Norra	6th	
1939–40	Tier 2	Division 2	Norra	4th	
1940–41	Tier 2	Division 2	Norra	9th	Relegated
1941–42	Tier 3	Division 3	Östsvenska Södra	6th	
1942–43	Tier 3	Division 3	Östsvenska Södra	2nd	
1943–44	Tier 3	Division 3	Östsvenska Södra	10th	Relegated

In recent seasons Värtans IK have competed in the following divisions:

Season	Level	Division	Section	Position	Movements
1994	Tier 5	Division 4	Stockholm Norra	10th	
1995	Tier 5	Division 4	Stockholm Mellersta	6th	
1996	Tier 5	Division 4	Stockholm Mellersta	1st	Promoted
1997	Tier 4	Division 3	Östra Svealand	1st	Promoted
1998	Tier 3	Division 2	Västra Svealand	8th	
1999	Tier 3	Division 2	Västra Svealand	4th	
2000	Tier 3	Division 2	Östra Svealand	7th	
2001	Tier 3	Division 2	Västra Svealand	9th	
2002	Tier 3	Division 2	Västra Svealand	11th	Relegated
2003	Tier 4	Division 3	Norra Svealand	8th	
2004	Tier 4	Division 3	Norra Svealand	5th	
2005	Tier 4	Division 3	Norra Svealand	1st	Promoted
2006*	Tier 4	Division 2	Norra Svealand	7th	
2007	Tier 4	Division 2	Norra Svealand	11th	Relegated
2008	Tier 5	Division 3	Norra Svealand	11th	Relegated
2009	Tier 6	Division 4	Stockholm Norra	12th	Relegated
2010	Tier 7	Division 5	Stockholm Mellersta	5th	
2011	Tier 7	Division 5	Stockholm Norra	1st	Promoted
2012	Tier 6	Division 4	Stockholm Norra	8th	
2013	Tier 6	Division 4	Stockholm Mellersta	5th	
2014	Tier 6	Division 4	Stockholm Mellersta	5th	
2015	Tier 6	Division 4	Stockholm Mellersta	3rd	
2016	Tier 6	Division 4	Stockholm Mellersta	8th	
2017	Tier 6	Division 4	Stockholm Mellersta	2nd	Promotion Playoffs - Not Promoted
2018	Tier 6	Division 4	Stockholm Mellersta	1st	Promoted
2019	Tier 5	Division 3	Norra Svealand	4th	
2020	Tier 5	Division 3	Norra Svealand		

* League restructuring in 2006 resulted in a new division being created at Tier 3 and subsequent divisions dropping a level.

== Attendances ==
In recent seasons Värtans IK have had the following average attendances:

Season	Average attendance	Division / Section	Level
2005	82	Div 3 Norra Svealand	Tier 5
2006	101	Div 2 Norra Svealand	Tier 4
2007	107	Div 2 Norra Svealand	Tier 4
2008	64	Div 3 Norra Svealand	Tier 5
2009	Not available	Div 4 Stockholm Norra	Tier 6
2010	Not available	Div 5 Stockholm Mellersta	Tier 7
2011	Not available	Div 5 Stockholm Norra	Tier 7
2012	Not available	Div 4 Stockholm Norra	Tier 6
2013	47	Div 4 Stockholm Mellersta	Tier 6
2014	42	Div 4 Stockholm Mellersta	Tier 6
2015	40	Div 4 Stockholm Mellersta	Tier 6
2016	51	Div 4 Stockholm Mellersta	Tier 6
2017	35	Div 4 Stockholm Mellersta	Tier 6
2018	Not available	Div 4 Stockholm Mellersta	Tier 6
2019	?	Div 3 Norra Svealand	Tier 5
2020		Div 3 Norra Svealand	Tier 5

* Attendances are provided in the Publikliga sections of the Svenska Fotbollförbundet website.
