= Nösnäsvallen =

Sports venue in Stenungsund, Sweden

Coordinates: 58.05492°N 11.82382°E

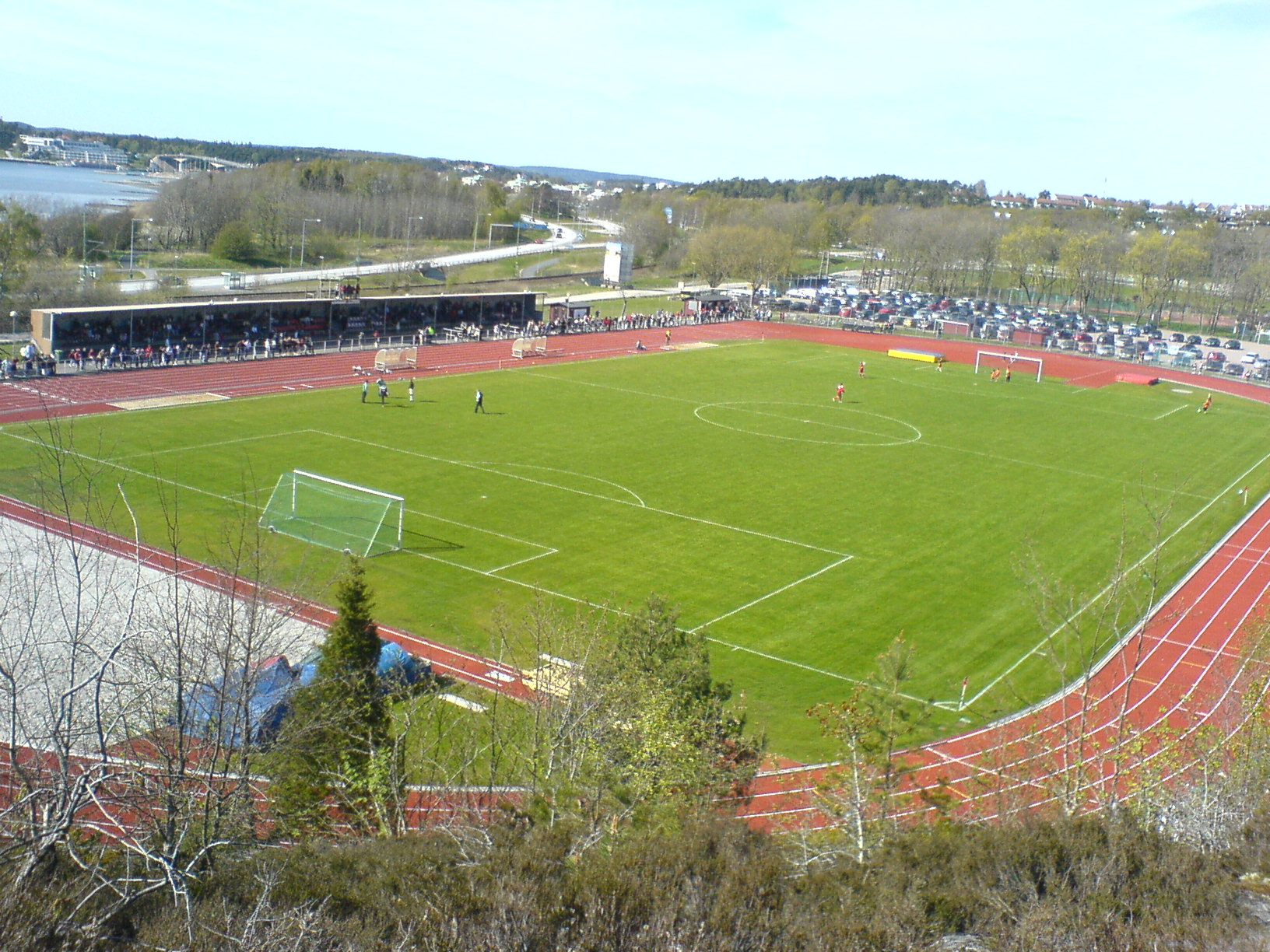
- Nösnäsvallen
- Interactive map of Nösnäsvallen
- Address: Stenungsund; Sweden
- Type: Sports ground

Tenant
- Stenungsunds IF (soccer)

Nösnäsvallen is a soccer and track and field athletics stadium in Stenungsund, Sweden. It is the home ground of Stenungsunds IF.

The Swedish national team practiced at Nösnäsvallen before both the 1990 FIFA World Cup and the Euro 2008. Team Brazil also practiced there before the 1990 FIFA World Cup.

The stadium also has an olympic running course and it has been used by Sweden national olympic team for training.
