= 2001 Division 2 (Swedish football) =

Swedish football league season

The following are the statistics of the Swedish football Division 2 in the season of 2001.

== League standings ==
=== Division 2 Norrland ===
Pos	Team	Pld	W	D	L	GF	GA	GD	Pts	Qualification or relegation
1	IFK Luleå	22	14	6	2	56	24	+32	48	Promotion Playoffs
2	Boden	22	13	5	4	45	21	+24	44	
3	Östersunds FK	22	10	7	5	52	29	+23	37	
4	Skellefteå AIK	22	9	7	6	34	20	+14	34	
5	Robertsfors	22	10	4	8	33	33	0	34	
6	Luleå Fotboll	22	9	2	11	35	32	+3	29	
7	Friska Viljor	22	8	5	9	33	33	0	29	
8	Selånger FK	22	7	7	8	27	38	−11	28	
9	Söderhamn	22	6	8	8	36	34	+2	26	
10	Kiruna	22	8	1	13	44	49	−5	25	Division 3 Relegation Playoffs
11	IFK Holmsund (R)	22	5	4	13	22	57	−35	19	Relegation to Division 3
12	Umedalen (R)	22	3	4	15	19	66	−47	13	Relegation to Division 3

Rules for classification: 1) points; 2) goal difference; 3) number of goals scored.
(R) Relegated

=== Division 2 Västra Svealand ===
Pos	Team	Pld	W	D	L	GF	GA	GD	Pts	Qualification or relegation
1	Syrianska Föreningen	22	15	5	2	51	19	+32	50	Promotion Playoffs
2	BK Forward	22	15	3	4	51	20	+31	48	
3	Rynninge	22	12	5	5	44	23	+21	41	
4	Degerfors IF	22	12	2	8	44	34	+10	38	
5	IFK Ölme	22	10	5	7	36	26	+10	35	
6	IK Sleipner	22	10	3	9	33	39	−6	33	
7	Eskilstuna City	22	9	4	9	33	35	−2	31	
8	Spårvägen	22	9	3	10	35	25	+10	30	
9	Värtan	22	9	2	11	28	42	−14	29	
10	Eskilstuna Södra	22	5	2	15	20	56	−36	17	Division 3 Relegation Playoffs
11	KB Karlskoga (R)	22	4	2	16	17	47	−30	14	Relegation to Division 3
12	Nyköpings BIS (R)	22	2	4	16	20	46	−26	10	Relegation to Division 3

Rules for classification: 1) points; 2) goal difference; 3) number of goals scored.
(R) Relegated

=== Division 2 Östra Svealand ===
Pos	Team	Pld	W	D	L	GF	GA	GD	Pts	Qualification or relegation
1	IF Brommapojkarna	20	13	4	3	60	20	+40	43	Promotion Playoffs
2	IK Sirius	20	12	6	2	47	22	+25	42	
3	Väsby IK	20	10	5	5	35	27	+8	35	
4	Essinge IK	20	9	5	6	43	30	+13	32	
5	Vallentuna	20	9	3	8	27	37	−10	30	
6	Valsta Syrianska IK	20	8	3	9	35	39	−4	27	
7	Visby IF Gute	20	7	5	8	29	40	−11	26	
8	Sandvikens IF	20	7	4	9	25	35	−10	25	
9	Slätta	20	7	3	10	30	44	−14	24	
10	Tyresö FF	20	4	3	13	29	48	−19	15	Division 3 Relegation Playoffs
11	Vindhemspojkarna (R)	20	2	3	15	26	54	−28	9	Relegation to Division 3

Rules for classification: 1) points; 2) goal difference; 3) number of goals scored.
(R) Relegated

=== Division 2 Östra Götaland ===
Pos	Team	Pld	W	D	L	GF	GA	GD	Pts	Qualification or relegation
1	Åtvidabergs FF	22	12	5	5	46	38	+8	41	Promotion Playoffs
2	Linköping	22	13	1	8	50	28	+22	40	
3	Tord	22	12	4	6	44	29	+15	40	
4	Grimsås	22	11	5	6	35	32	+3	38	
5	Tidaholms GIF	22	11	3	8	34	33	+1	36	
6	Jönköpings Södra IF	22	10	5	7	41	37	+4	35	
7	Husqvarna FF	22	8	8	6	48	38	+10	32	
8	IFK Värnamo	22	7	5	10	35	35	0	26	
9	Myresjö IF	22	6	8	8	33	35	−2	26	
10	Nybro IF	22	5	9	8	34	45	−11	24	Division 3 Relegation Playoffs
11	Gullringen (R)	22	2	7	13	28	51	−23	13	Relegation to Division 3
12	Kalmar AIK (R)	22	2	6	14	26	53	−27	12	Relegation to Division 3

Rules for classification: 1) points; 2) goal difference; 3) number of goals scored.
(R) Relegated

=== Division 2 Västra Götaland ===
Pos	Team	Pld	W	D	L	GF	GA	GD	Pts	Qualification or relegation
1	Panos Ljungskile	22	14	3	5	35	22	+13	45	Promotion Playoffs
2	Ytterby	22	14	2	6	39	24	+15	44	
3	Gunnilse	22	13	3	6	54	31	+23	42	
4	Trollhättans FK	22	11	4	7	34	28	+6	37	
5	Qviding FIF	22	9	3	10	34	34	0	30	
6	Norrby IF	22	9	3	10	34	35	−1	30	
7	Torslanda IK	22	9	3	10	34	36	−2	30	
8	Skärhamn	22	9	3	10	28	31	−3	30	
9	Trollhättans IF	22	8	3	11	35	43	−8	27	
10	IF Heimer	22	6	4	12	33	46	−13	22	Division 3 Relegation Playoffs
11	Skene (R)	22	6	3	13	31	48	−17	21	Relegation to Division 3
12	Kongahälla (R)	22	6	2	14	34	47	−13	20	Relegation to Division 3

Rules for classification: 1) points; 2) goal difference; 3) number of goals scored.
(R) Relegated

=== Division 2 Södra Götaland ===
Pos	Team	Pld	W	D	L	GF	GA	GD	Pts	Qualification or relegation
1	Ängelholms FF	22	12	4	6	40	25	+15	40	Promotion Playoffs
2	Ystad	22	11	4	7	47	31	+16	37	
3	Helsingborgs Södra BIS	22	10	7	5	46	30	+16	37	
4	Laholm	22	10	3	9	24	38	−14	33	
5	Höllvikens GIF	22	8	6	8	33	36	−3	30	
6	Lunds BK	22	8	5	9	30	28	+2	29	
7	IFK Trelleborg	22	8	5	9	23	22	+1	29	
8	Högaborg	22	9	2	11	31	39	−8	29	
9	Falkenbergs FF	22	9	1	12	33	40	−7	28	
10	IF Leikin	22	7	6	9	27	35	−8	27	Division 3 Relegation Playoffs
11	Kristianstads FF (R)	22	8	2	12	38	43	−5	26	Relegation to Division 3
12	Ljungby (R)	22	7	5	10	31	36	−5	26	Relegation to Division 3

Rules for classification: 1) points; 2) goal difference; 3) number of goals scored.
(R) Relegated
