= IFK Malmö Bandy =

IFK Malmö
- City: Malmö, Sweden
- Founded: 1899; 127 years ago
- Home arena: Sjöaltsvallen

IFK Malmö Bandy is the Bandy department of the sports club IFK Malmö. IFK plays in the Division 2 Västra Götaland league which is in the third level of the Swedish bandy league system. They play their home games at Sjöaltsvallen.
