= IK Kongahälla =

Swedish football club

- Full name: Idrottsklubben Kongahälla
- Nickname: IKK
- Founded: 1906
- Ground: IP Kongevi; Kungälv; Sweden
- Chairman: Lennart Carlsson
- Head coach: Mikael Björkqvist & Oscar Marek
- League: Division 4 Göteborg A
Home colours

IK Kongahälla is a Swedish football club located in Kungälv.

== Background ==
IK Kongahälla currently plays in Division 4 Göteborg A which is the sixth tier of Swedish football. They play their home matches at the IP Kongevi in Kungälv.

The club is affiliated to Göteborgs Fotbollförbund. IK Kongahälla have competed in the Svenska Cupen on 28 occasions and have played 70 matches in the competition.

== Season to Season ==
Season	Level	Division	Section	Position	Movements
1993	Tier 4	Division 3	Nordvästra Götaland	2nd	
1994	Tier 4	Division 3	Nordvästra Götaland	4th	
1995	Tier 4	Division 3	Nordvästra Götaland	1st	Promoted
1996	Tier 3	Division 2	Västra Götaland	5th	
1997	Tier 3	Division 2	Västra Götaland	7th	
1998	Tier 3	Division 2	Västra Götaland	2nd	Promotion Playoffs – Promoted
1999	Tier 2	Division 1	Södra	10th	Relegated
2000	Tier 3	Division 2	Västra Götaland	3rd	
2001	Tier 3	Division 2	Västra Götaland	12th	Relegated
2002	Tier 4	Division 3	Nordvästra Götaland	10th	Relegated
2003	Tier 5	Division 4	Göteborg A	4th	
2004	Tier 5	Division 4	Göteborg A	1st	Promoted
2005	Tier 4	Division 3	Nordvästra Götaland	6th	
2006*	Tier 5	Division 3	Nordvästra Götaland	6th	
2007	Tier 5	Division 3	Nordvästra Götaland	8th	
2008	Tier 5	Division 3	Nordvästra Götaland	7th	
2009	Tier 5	Division 3	Nordvästra Götaland	10th	Relegated
2010	Tier 6	Division 4	Göteborg A	4th	
2011	Tier 6	Division 4	Göteborg A	5th	

* League restructuring in 2006 resulted in a new division being created at Tier 3 and subsequent divisions dropping a level.
