= Stenungsunds IF =

Swedish football club

- Full name: Stenungsunds Idrottsförening
- Nicknames: De Röda Bröderna (The Red Brothers)
- Short name: SIF
- Founded: 27 April 1927; 98 years ago
- Ground: SIF-gården, Stenungsund
- Chairman: Annika Åberg Darell
- Head coach: Andreas Kärnfalk
- League: Division 2 Norra Götaland
- 2025: Division 3 Mellersta Götaland, 1st of 12 (promoted)
- Website: http://www.stenungsundsif.se/
Home colours	Away colours

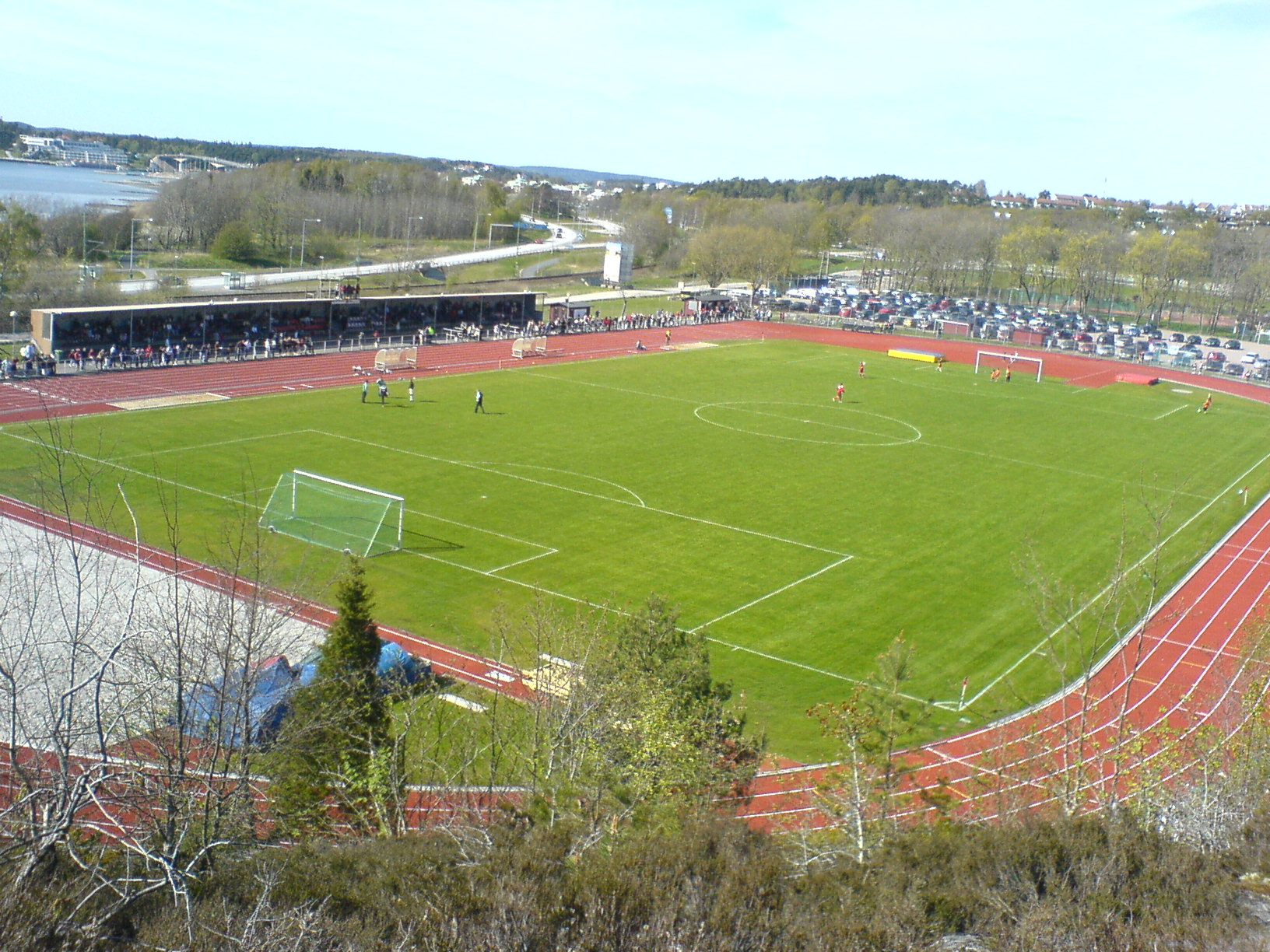
Nösnäsvallen

Stenungsunds IF is a Swedish football club located in Stenungsund.

== Background ==
Stenungsunds IF currently plays in Division 3 Mellersta Götaland which is the fifth tier of Swedish football. They play their home matches at SIF-gården, currently known as Olssons Trävaror Arena for sponsorship reasons, in Stenungsund. They previously played at Nösnäsvallen. The club is affiliated to Bohusläns Fotbollförbund.

Stenungsunds IF have competed in the Svenska Cupen on 25 occasions and have played 67 matches in the competition. Their latest occasion was in 2020–21 and their best performance was in 1997–98 were they managed to get to the quarter-finals before getting knocked out by Helsingborgs IF.

The club played in the Swedish second division during the second half of the 1990s. The 1998 season saw the club failing to reach the Allsvenskan qualification games, losing 1–2 on home soil against Landskrona BoIS in Division 1 Södra.

== Season-to-season ==
Season	Level	League	Pos	District Championship	Svenska Cupen
1967	Tier 5	Division 5 Bohuslän	1st (P)		
1968	Tier 4	Division 4 Bohuslän/Dalsland	2nd		
1969	Tier 4	Division 4 Bohuslän/Dalsland	2nd		
1970	Tier 4	Division 4 Bohuslän/Dalsland	4th		
1971	Tier 4	Division 4 Bohuslän/Dalsland	9th		
1972	Tier 4	Division 4 Bohuslän/Dalsland	5th		
1973	Tier 4	Division 4 Bohuslän/Dalsland	9th		
1974	Tier 4	Division 4 Bohuslän/Dalsland	1st (P)		
1975	Tier 3	Division 3 Nordvästra Götaland	8th		
1976	Tier 3	Division 3 Nordvästra Götaland	11th (R)		
1977	Tier 4	Division 4 Bohuslän/Dalsland	7th		
1978	Tier 4	Division 4 Bohuslän/Dalsland	8th		
1979	Tier 4	Division 4 Bohuslän/Dalsland	2nd		
1980	Tier 4	Division 4 Bohuslän/Dalsland	1st (P)		
1981	Tier 3	Division 3 Nordvästra Götaland	3rd		
1982	Tier 3	Division 3 Nordvästra Götaland	9th		
1983	Tier 3	Division 3 Nordvästra Götaland	10th (R)		
1984	Tier 4	Division 4 Bohuslän/Dalsland	1st (P)		
1985	Tier 3	Division 3 Nordvästra Götaland	10th (R)		
1986	Tier 4	Division 4 Bohuslän/Dalsland	3rd		
1987 (Note: League restructuring in 1987 resulted in a new division being created at Tier 2 and subsequent divisions dropping a level.)	Tier 5	Division 4 Bohuslän/Dalsland	1st (P)		
1988	Tier 4	Division 3 Nordvästra Götaland	6th		
1989	Tier 4	Division 3 Nordvästra Götaland	4th		
1990	Tier 4	Division 3 Nordvästra Götaland	7th		
1991	Tier 4	Division 3 Nordvästra Götaland	3rd		
1992	Tier 4	Division 3 Nordvästra Götaland A	3rd		
1992	Tier 4	Division 3 Nordvästra Götaland	2nd (P)		
1993	Tier 3	Division 2 Västra Götaland	2nd (P)		
1994	Tier 2	Division 1 Södra	9th		Round of 64
1995	Tier 2	Division 1 Södra	10th		
1996	Tier 2	Division 1 Södra	3rd		
1997	Tier 2	Division 1 Södra	5th		Quarter-finals
1998	Tier 2	Division 1 Södra	5th		Round of 32
1999	Tier 2	Division 1 Södra	14th (R)		Round of 64
2000	Tier 3	Division 2 Västra Götaland	12th (R)		
2001	Tier 4	Division 3 Nordvästra Götaland	12th (R)		
2002	Tier 5	Division 4 Bohuslän/Dalsland	2nd		
2003	Tier 5	Division 4 Bohuslän/Dalsland	1st (P)		
2004	Tier 4	Division 3 Nordvästra Götaland	9th (R)		
2005	Tier 5	Division 4 Bohuslän/Dalsland	7th		
2006 (Note: League restructuring in 2006 resulted in a new division being created at Tier 3 and subsequent divisions dropping a level.)	Tier 6	Division 4 Bohuslän/Dalsland	1st (P)	Champions	
2007	Tier 5	Division 3 Nordvästra Götaland	5th		Round of 64
2008	Tier 5	Division 3 Nordvästra Götaland	12th (R)		
2009	Tier 6	Division 4 Bohuslän/Dalsland	4th	Semi-finals	
2010	Tier 6	Division 4 Bohuslän/Dalsland	4th	Group stage	
2011	Tier 6	Division 4 Bohuslän/Dalsland	1st (P)	Semi-finals	
2012	Tier 5	Division 3 Nordvästra Götaland	3rd	Runners-up	
2013	Tier 5	Division 3 Nordvästra Götaland	2nd (P)	Semi-finals	
2014	Tier 4	Division 2 Norra Götaland	11th	Quarter-finals	
2015	Tier 4	Division 2 Norra Götaland	9th	Quarter-finals	
2016	Tier 4	Division 2 Norra Götaland	4th	Quarter-finals	
2017	Tier 4	Division 2 Norra Götaland	11th	Champions	
2018	Tier 4	Division 2 Norra Götaland	5th	Semi-finals	Round 1
2019	Tier 4	Division 2 Norra Götaland	3rd	Runners-up	
2020	Tier 4	Division 2 Norra Götaland	3rd	Runners-up	Round 2
2021	Tier 4	Division 2 Norra Götaland	5th	No tournament	
2022	Tier 4	Division 2 Norra Götaland	9th	Runners-up	
2023	Tier 4	Division 2 Norra Götaland	5th	Semi-finals	
2024	Tier 4	Division 2 Norra Götaland	12th (R)	Champions	
2025	Tier 5	Division 3 Mellersta Götaland	1st (P)	Quarters-finals	Round 1
2026	Tier 4	Division 2 Norra Götaland			
