= IFK Malmö =

Sports club in Malmö, Sweden

- IFK Malmö logo
- Full name: Idrottsföreningen Malmö Sweden
- Nicknames: Di gule, Kanariefåglarna
- Sport: football, bandy, handball
- Founded: 1899
- Based in: Malmö, Sweden
- Stadium: Malmö Stadion
- Head coach: Olle Nordin
- Website: www.ifkmalmo.se

Idrottsföreningen Kamraterna Malmö, more commonly known as IFK Malmö, is a Swedish sports club with several departments, located in Malmö. The club was founded on 23 April 1899.

The football department of IFK Malmö is one of the oldest football clubs in Sweden.

== Departments ==
- Bandy, see IFK Malmö Bandy
- Association football, see IFK Malmö Fotboll
- Handball, see IFK Malmö Handboll
