= Lundby IF =

Swedish football club

Lundby IF is a football club formed in 1919 located in Hisingen, Gothenburg, Sweden. The club currently plays in Division 5.

== History ==
=== 1940s ===
In 1939–1940, during the time the team played in Division 3. After winning the league, the team was promoted to Division 2. The following year the club won the Division 2 Västra. After their win, the team place 8th for 1942–1943 season. From 1943 to 1944, the club came in 7th place. The 1944–1945 season Lundby IF placed 3rd and, in 1946–1947, the club came in 6th place in the same division.

=== 1990s to Present ===
In 1995, the club won the Division 2 Västra Götaland and were promoted to Division 1 Södra. The following year Lundby played in Division 1 Södra and placed 12th. In 1997, the team were relegated back to Division 2 but were promoted back to Division 1 after winning Division 2.In 1998, the team placed 13th in Division 1. As a result, the team was demoted back to Division 2.

In 2006, the team part took in the Svenska Cup and lost against FC Trollhättan. The team was unable to finish the 2006 season after the club went bankrupt. Following the bankruptcy, a new outlet was formed called Lundby IF 06.

In 2015, "06" was removed from the club name. In 2019, coinciding with the clubs 100th year anniversary, the team once again re-entered senior football. After winning promotion two times in three years, the men's team compete in division 5 in 2025. In 2024, the club also started a women's team, which currently competes in division 5. Lundby IF are affiliated to the Göteborgs Fotbollförbund.

== Notable players ==
Former players include Teddy Lucic, Bosko Orovic, Tobias Hysén, Dime Jankulovski, Bengt "Fölet" Berndtsson, Teddy Olausson, and Torbjörn Lundblad.
