= Lira BK =

Swedish football club

- Full name: Lira Bollklubb
- Founded: 1933
- Ground: Porsö IP; Luleå; Sweden
- League: Division 4 Norrbotten Norra
- 2019: Division 4 Norrbotten Norra, 7th
Home colours

Lira BK is a Swedish football club located in Luleå.

== Background ==
Lira BK were founded in 1933 and for many years played in the lower part of the Swedish league pyramid. From 1995 until 1999 during the most successful period in the history of the club, the title Lira Luleå BK was used. The club played 3 seasons in Division 1 Norra during this period. In 2000 the club voluntarily donated its place in Division 2 Norrland to Luleå Fotboll.

Lira BK currently plays in Division 4 Norrbotten Norra which is the sixth tier of Swedish football. They play their home matches at the Porsö IP in Luleå.

The club is affiliated to Norrbottens Fotbollförbund. Lira is today Norrland's biggest football club with 3,000 members and 800 players aged 7 to 18 years old.

== Season to season ==
In their most successful period Lira Luleå BK competed in the following divisions:

Season	Level	Division	Section	Position	Movements
1991	Tier 4	Division 3	Norra Norrland	3rd	
1992	Tier 4	Division 3	Norra Norrland A – Playoff to Hösttvåan	5th	Vårserier (Spring Series)
1992	Tier 4	Division 3	Norra Norrland	1st	Höstserier (Autumn Series) – Promoted
1993	Tier 3	Division 2	Norrland	4th	
1994	Tier 3	Division 2	Norrland	1st	Promoted
1995	Tier 2	Division 1	Norra	14th	Relegated
1996	Tier 3	Division 2	Norrland	1st	Promoted
1997	Tier 2	Division 1	Norra	11th	Relegated
1998	Tier 3	Division 2	Norrland	1st	Promoted
1999	Tier 2	Division 1	Norra	12th	Relegated

In recent seasons Lira BK have competed in the following divisions:

Season	Level	Division	Section	Position	Movements
2006*	Tier 7	Division 5	Norrbotten Mellersta	1st	Promoted
2007	Tier 6	Division 4	Norrbotten Norra	8th	
2008	Tier 6	Division 4	Norrbotten Norra	10th	Relegated
2009	Tier 7	Division 5	Norrbotten Södra	1st	Promoted
2010	Tier 6	Division 4	Norrbotten Norra	8th	
2011	Tier 6	Division 4	Norrbotten Norra	4th	
2012	Tier 6	Division 4	Norrbotten Norra	4th	
2013	Tier 6	Division 4	Norrbotten Norra	7th	
2014	Tier 6	Division 4	Norrbotten Norra	3rd	
2015	Tier 6	Division 4	Norrbotten Norra	3rd	
2016	Tier 6	Division 4	Norrbotten Norra	9th	
2017	Tier 6	Division 4	Norrbotten Norra	7th	
2018	Tier 6	Division 4	Norrbotten Norra	5th	
2019	Tier 6	Division 4	Norrbotten Norra	7th	
2020	Tier 6	Division 4	Norrbotten Norra		

* League restructuring in 2006 resulted in a new division being created at Tier 3 and subsequent divisions dropping a level.

== Attendances ==
In recent seasons Lira BK have had the following average attendances:

Season	Average attendance	Division / Section	Level
2012	46	Div 4 Norrbotten Norra	Tier 6
2013	44	Div 4 Norrbotten Norra	Tier 6
2014	59	Div 4 Norrbotten Norra	Tier 6
2015	42	Div 4 Norrbotten Norra	Tier 6
2016	60	Div 4 Norrbotten Norra	Tier 6
2017	54	Div 4 Norrbotten Norra	Tier 6
2018	?	Div 4 Norrbotten Norra	Tier 6
2019	?	Div 4 Norrbotten Norra	Tier 6
2020	?	Div 4 Norrbotten Norra	Tier 6

* Attendances are provided in the Publikliga sections of the Svenska Fotbollförbundet website.
