= Boo FK =

Swedish association football team

- Full name: Boo Fotbollsklubb
- Founded: 2011
- Ground: Boovallen, Nacka, Stockholm
- Chairman: Thomas Bodström
- Manager: Patrik Gerrbrand
- League: Division 2 Norra Svealand
- 2014: Division 2 Södra Svealand, 4th
- Website: https://booff.myclub.se

Boo FK is a Swedish football team from Nacka, Stockholm founded in 2011. They play their matches at Boovallen.

The original Nacka FF was founded in 1990 and went bankrupt in 2001. The current Nacka FF was created from Boo FF and Hammarby TFF in December 2011.

In 2016 the team changed the name from Nacka FF to Boo FK, to strengthen the connection to Boo FF and the youth teams in the club.
