= Gunnilse IS =

Swedish football club

- Full name: Gunnilse Idrottssällskap
- Founded: 1950; 76 years ago
- Ground: Hjällbovallen; Angered
- Capacity: 3,000
- Chairman: Tomas Magnusson
- Manager: Robert Nilsson
- League: Division 4 Västra Götaland
Home colours	Away colours

Gunnilse IS is a Swedish football club located in Angered, a suburb of Gothenburg.

== Background ==
Since their foundation on 16 September 1950 Gunnilse IS has participated mainly in the middle and lower divisions of the Swedish football league system. The club currently (2012) plays in Division 2 Västra Götaland which is the fourth tier of Swedish football. Their best achievement was in 2000 when they played one season in the Superettan. They play their home matches at the Hjällbovallen, in Angered, Gothenburg.

Gunnilse IS are affiliated to the Göteborgs Fotbollförbund.

== Season to season ==
Season	Level	Division	Section	Position	Movements
1993	Tier 2	Division 1	Södra	7th	
1994	Tier 2	Division 1	Södra	8th	
1995	Tier 2	Division 1	Södra	6th	
1996	Tier 2	Division 1	Södra	7th	
1997	Tier 2	Division 1	Södra	3rd	
1998	Tier 2	Division 1	Södra	8th	
1999	Tier 2	Division 1	Södra	6th	
2000	Tier 2	Superettan		16th	Relegated
2001	Tier 3	Division 2	Västra Götaland	3rd	
2002	Tier 3	Division 2	Västra Götaland	4th	
2003	Tier 3	Division 2	Västra Götaland	3rd	
2004	Tier 3	Division 2	Västra Götaland	6th	
2005	Tier 3	Division 2	Västra Götaland	9th	
2006*	Tier 4	Division 2	Västra Götaland	6th	
2007	Tier 4	Division 2	Västra Götaland	9th	
2008	Tier 4	Division 2	Västra Götaland	2nd	
2009	Tier 4	Division 2	Västra Götaland	5th	
2010	Tier 4	Division 2	Västra Götaland	3rd	
2011	Tier 4	Division 2	Norra Götaland	6th	
2012	Tier 4	Division 2	Västra Götaland	12th	Relegated

* League restructuring in 2006 resulted in a new division being created at Tier 3 and subsequent divisions dropping a level.

== Current squad ==
As of 1 January 2010

Note: Flags indicate national team as defined under FIFA eligibility rules; some limited exceptions apply. Players may hold more than one non-FIFA nationality.

No.	Pos.	Nation	Player
1	GK	SWE	Dejan Gorcanac
2	MF	SWE	Rengber Kalasch
3	MF	ERI	Petros Ahferom
4	DF	SWE	Hampus Nestenborg
5	DF	SWE	Suleyman Traore
6	DF	SWE	Elvir Ramadani
7	FW	SWE	Daniel Pereira
8	DF	SWE	Kenneth Gustafsson

No.	Pos.	Nation	Player
9	FW	SWE	Ajdin Slijvar
10	MF	SWE	Ali Sanduvac
12	FW	SWE	Dennis Skjöld
13	FW	SWE	Ayoub Ahmad
14	MF	SWE	Mauricio Lopez
15	MF	SWE	Erik Svensson
16	FW	SWE	Mario Deno

== Achievements ==
=== League ===
- Division 1 Västra
  - Runners-up (1): 1992
