= Sliprännor i Gantofta =

Coordinates: 55.9775°N 12.8162°E

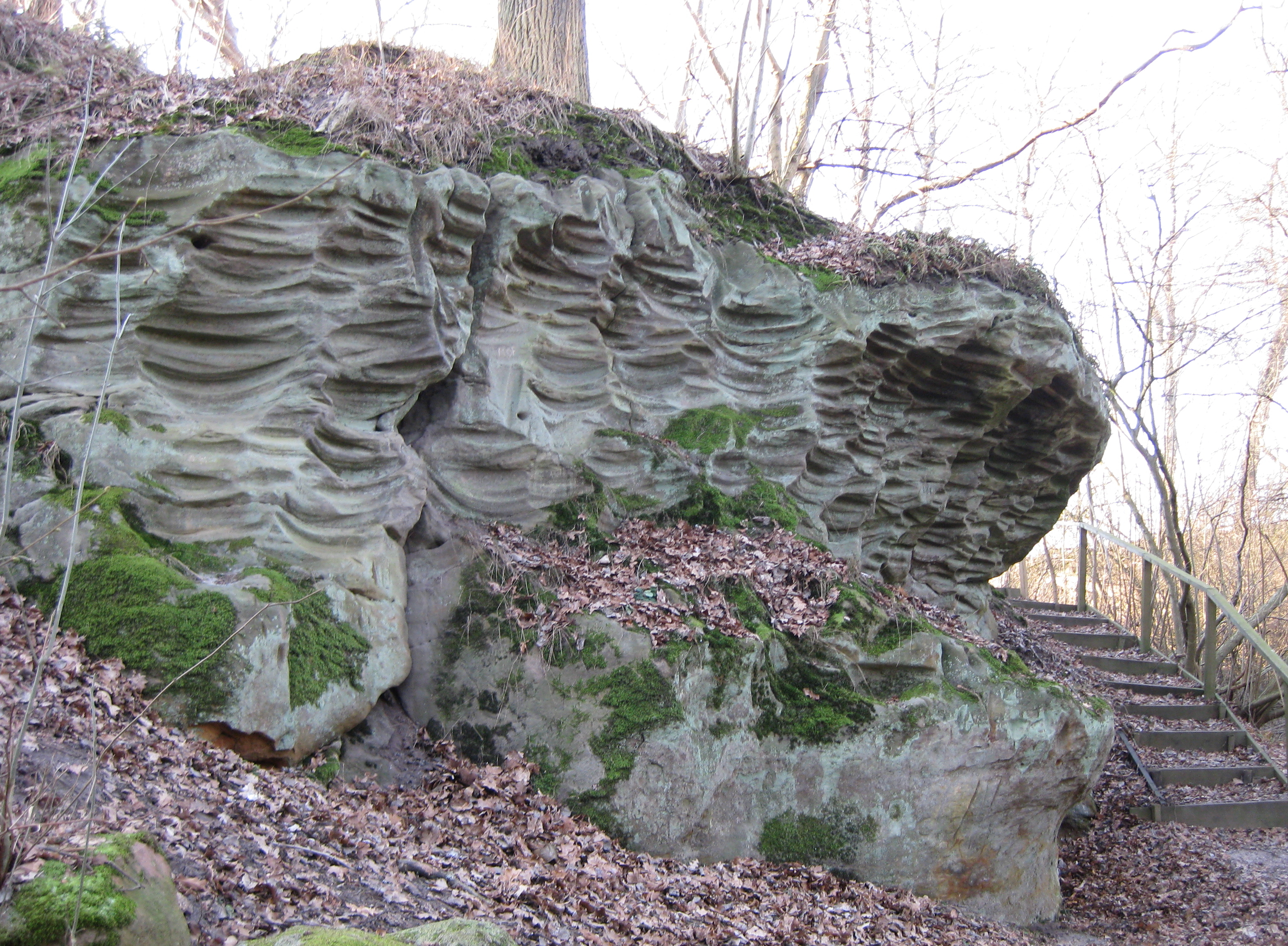
Sliprännor i Gantofta

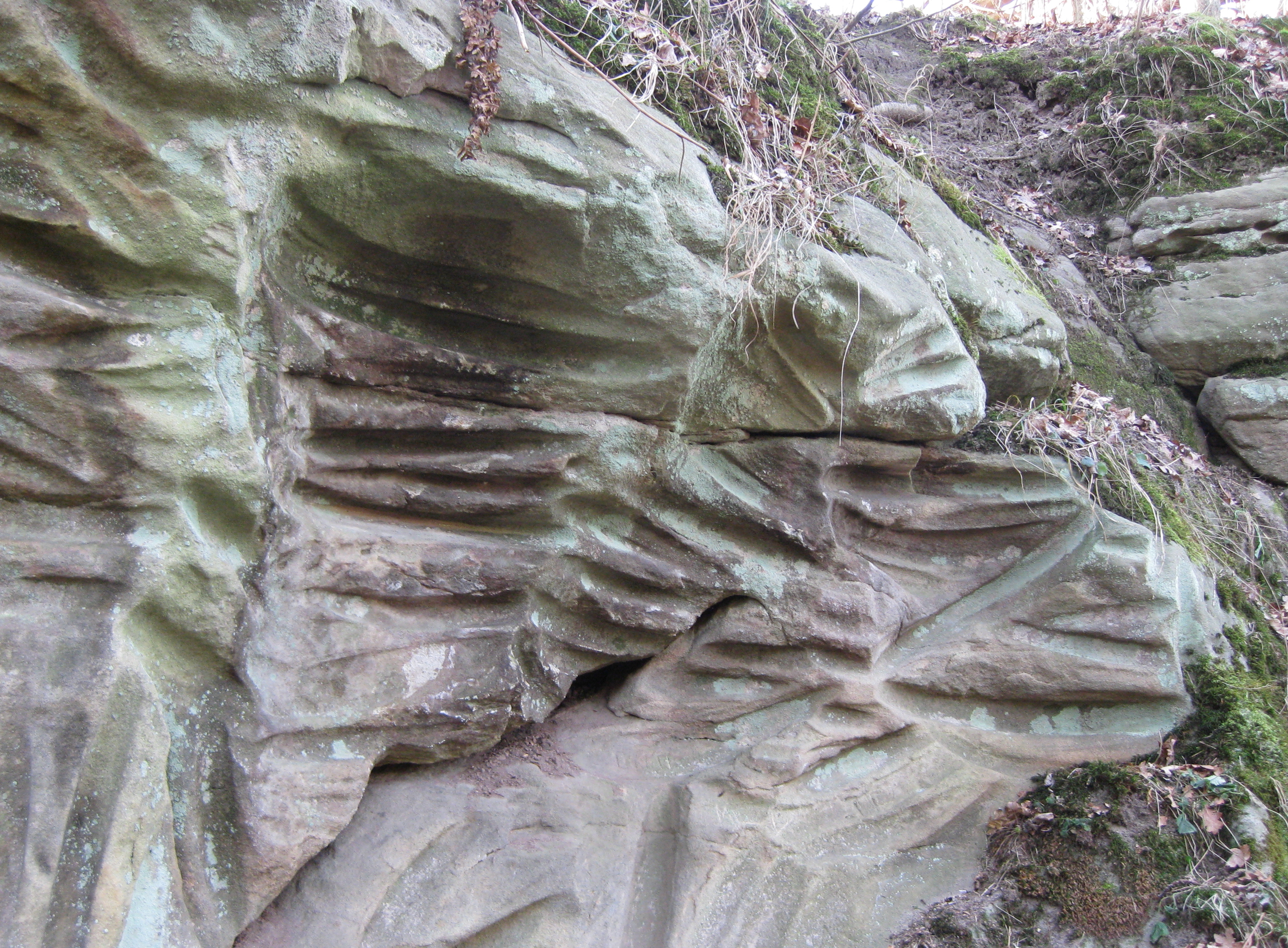
Sliprännor i Gantofta; Detail

The Sliprännor i Gantofta are stone carvings located near the village of Gantofta at Helsingborg Municipality in Scania, Sweden. They are situated on the escarpment of the Råå river valley (Rååns dalgång) in a sandstone outcrop.

== History ==
Traditionally, they were held to be grooves produced by people sharpening knives and axes, like numerous straight grooves in Gotland. However, modern surveys of the concave horizontal grooves may indicate that they were created by means of a pendulum motion or a rotating wheel. Today it is believed that the concave grooves in particular (and possibly also the straight ones) are the remains of ritual with religious or magical significance. Grooves are particularly common in the northwest of Scania, especially on the Kullen peninsula, Gotland and Östergötland. Traces of the Stone Age Pitted Ware culture (c. 3200-2600 BC) are also common in these areas. However, there is as yet no certain evidence that the grooves were made during the Stone Age.

== See also ==
- Gantoftadösen

== Other sources ==
- Rosborn, Sven (1992). "Det randiga berget i Gantofta". Populär Historia 1/1992.
