= Andreas Murbeck =

Swedish footballer (born 1998)

Personal information
- Full name: Johan Andreas Richard Murbeck
- Date of birth: 1 May 1998 (age 28)
- Place of birth: Malmö, Sweden
- Height: 1.92 m (6 ft 4 in)
- Position: Centre-back

Team information
- Current team: Landskrona BoIS
- Number: 26

Youth career
- Furulunds IK
- 2007–2013: Malmö FF
- 2014: Landskrona BoIS
- 2015–2017: FC Midtjylland

Senior career*
Years	Team	Apps	(Gls)
2017–2018	Skive IK	13	(1)
2019–2020	Ljungskile SK	47	(2)
2021	Landskrona BoIS	25	(0)
2022–2024	IK Sirius	16	(0)
2025–	Landskrona BoIS	28	(3)
- * Club domestic league appearances and goals as of 11 November 2026

Andreas Murbeck (born 1 May 1998) is a Swedish footballer who plays as a defender for Landskrona BoIS in Superettan.

== Early life ==
Murbeck hails from Kävlinge and started his youth career in Furulunds IK. From the ages 9 to 15 he played for the largest club in Southern Sweden, Malmö FF. He also played for Landskrona BoIS before moving abroad, to the academy of FC Midtjylland in Denmark. With Midtjylland, Murbeck won the Danish U19 League of 2015–16 and finished runner-up in 2016–17. He was named Best Player in the Danish youth league. He also finished his secondary education at Ikast-Brande Gymnasium.

== Career ==
After the 2016–17 season he was allowed to train with the first team, but was not given a contract. He then trained with IFK Göteborg. Following one year in the 2017-18 Danish 1st Division with Skive IK, he went on trial with Vendsyssel FF in the summer of 2018. In 2019 he moved some miles north of Göteborg, to sign for Ljungskile SK and contest the 2019 Ettan. While playing here, he resided with teammate Johan Brannefalk.

In 2021 he moved back to Southern Sweden and his former youth club, Landskrona BoIS. Landskrona was noted for making do only with players from the region. It was therefore dubbed "Sweden's Athletic Club" in the media. At the same time, Landskrona did not play as a fully professional team. With players working on the side, Murbeck was a manager of a padel arena.

After one season in Landskrona, though, Murbeck attracted interest from several larger clubs, possibly in several countries. In early February 2022 he signed for IK Sirius and was flown directly to their training camp in Spain. He managed to get his competitive debut for Sirius, in the . In late March he ruptured a cruciate ligament and was ruled out for the rest of the year. Having hoped to return in 2023, he was still out by the summer of that year.

Finally, Murbeck managed to return to training in November 2023. His first friendly match came against Degerfors in January 2024. His first start in the Allsvenskan was against Mjällby in July 2024. Murbeck played 16 games of the 2024 Allsvenskan. He did not gain a regular starting place, however, and was allowed to rejoin Landskrona ahead of the 2025 season. Part of the reason why he moved to Southern Sweden again was that he started a relationship with an air stewardess who often worked out of Copenhagen. The couple therefore settled in Lund (Murbeck resided in Eslöv during his previous spell with BoIS). However, before the start of the 2025 Superettan, Murbeck sustained an achilles tendon injury that might keep him away from football for 6 to 9 months.
