= 2006 Svenska Cupen =

Tournament details
- Country: Sweden
- Teams: 98

Final positions
- Champions: Helsingborgs IF
- Runners-up: Gefle IF

Tournament statistics
- Matches played: 97

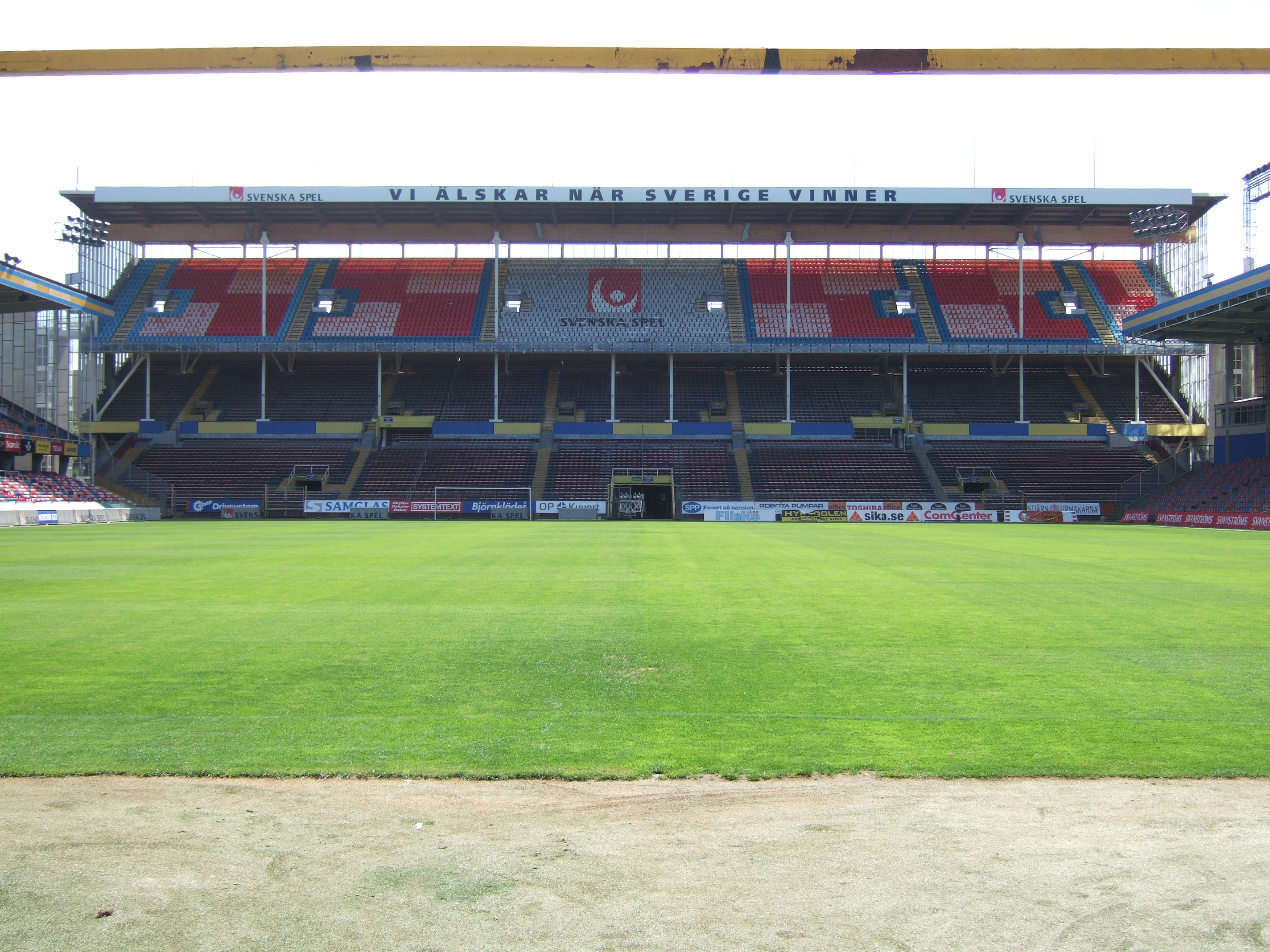
Råsunda Stadium

The 2006 Svenska Cupen was the 51st season of the main Swedish football Cup. The competition started on 17 March 2006 and concluded on 11 November 2006 with the final, held at Råsunda Stadium, Solna Municipality in Stockholm County. Helsingborgs IF won the final 2–0 against Gefle IF before an attendance of 3,379.

== First round ==
The 34 matches were played between 17 March and 8 April 2006. There were 68 teams in the first round from Division 1, Division 2 and Division 3, but also including a few teams from Division 4 and Division 5.

Team 1	Score	Team 2
17 March 2006
Jönköpings Södra IF	6–0	Malmslätts AIK
26 March 2006
Lyckeby GoIF	0–2	Kalmar AIK
28 March 2006
Eneby BK	1–5	Enskede IK
Gunnilse IS	5–2 (aet)	Husqvarna FF
30 March 2006
FC Trollhättan	1–0	Lundby IF
Oxie IF	1–4	Gantofta IF
FF Södertälje	w/o^{1}	Topkapi Konya KIF
1 April 2006
FK Jat	3–0	Borås AIK
Bollstanäs SK	0–7	Visby IF Gute
Eslövs BK	4–2	Tvååkers IF
IFK Fjärås	0–1	IFK Hässleholm
Motala AIF	5–1	Myresjö IF
Skiljebo SK	1–1 (aet); 4–2 (p)	Syrianska FC
Säters IF	0–4	IK Sirius
Ersboda SK	4–1	Robertsfors IK
Friska Viljor FC	2–4 (aet)	Östersunds FK
IFK Tidaholm	0–4	IFK Värnamo
Väröbacka GIF	0–3	Slottsskogen/Godhem IF
Grimsås IF	0–2	Ängelholms FF
IF Heimer	1–0	IFK Ölme
IF Viken	1–1 (aet); 5–4 (p)	Hertzöga BK
Sandvikens IF	9–0	Skinnskattebergs SK
Kulladals FF	1–4	Höllvikens GIF
2 April 2006
IFK Viksjö	0–1	Hammarby TFF
Tidaholms GIF	1–2 (aet)	BK Forward
Atlas Copco IF	0–3	Spårvägens FF
Dalens/KFF	1–2	Tenhults IF
Stavstens IF	0–4	Kristianstads FF
Sandareds IF	0–1	Skärhamns IK
Rynninge IK	3–5	Carlstads United BK
5 April 2006
Hudiksvalls ABK	2–2 (aet); 5–3 (p)	IFK Timrå
6 April 2006
Vasalund/Essinge IF	5–1	Heby AIF
8 April 2006
Avesta AIK	0–3	Enköpings SK
Haparanda FF	1–3 (aet)	Sävast AIF

^{1}Topkapi Konya KIF withdrew from the competition.

== Second round ==
In this round the 34 winning teams from the previous round were joined by 30 teams from Allsvenskan and Superettan. The 32 matches were played between 12 April and 18 May 2006.

Team 1	Score	Team 2
12 April 2006
Gunnilse IS	3–3 (aet); 4–3 (p)	Bodens BK
IFK Värnamo	1–2	Örebro SK
Sandvikens IF	0–3	Västerås SK
13 April 2006
Enskede IK	2–3	Väsby United
Spårvägens FF	0–3	Trelleborgs FF
Vasalund/Essinge IF	0–5	Falkenbergs FF
IFK Norrköping	2–0	Östersunds FK
Kalmar AIK	0–3	Örgryte IS
Gantofta IF	1–2	Kristianstads FF
14 April 2006
BK Forward	2–2 (aet); 2–3 (p)	Landskrona BoIS
17 April 2006
FF Södertälje	0–8	GAIS
Motala AIF	3–6 (aet)	Enköpings SK
18 April 2006
Tenhults IF	0–1	Östers IF
19 April 2006
IF Viken	1–3	Mjällby AIF
Jönköpings Södra IF	3–0	BK Häcken
Visby IF Gute	2–0	Ljungskile SK
IF Heimer	3–6 (aet)	IFK Göteborg
Ersboda SK	1–3	Degerfors IF
IK Sirius	1–2	IF Brommapojkarna
FC Trollhättan	3–0	GIF Sundsvall
20 April 2006
AIK	4–0	Hudiksvalls ABK
FK Jat	0–8	Malmö FF
Ängelholms FF	1–1 (aet); 2–4 (p)	Gefle IF
Carlstad United BK	6–1	Västra Frölunda IF
Eslövs BK	0–1	Assyriska Föreningen
Sävast AIF	0–9	Hammarby IF
Höllvikens GIF	0–2	Åtvidabergs FF
29 April 2006
Slottskogen/Godhem IF	0–8	IF Elfsborg
4 May 2006
Skiljebo SK	2–3	Kalmar FF
17 May 2006
Hammarby TFF	1–2	Halmstads BK
18 May 2006
Skärhamns IK	0–2	Helsingborgs IF
IFK Hässleholm	1–3	Djurgårdens IF

== Third round ==
The 16 matches in this round were played between 16 May and 6 July 2006

Team 1	Score	Team 2
16 May 2006
Carlstad United BK	0–2	IFK Norrköping
17 May 2006
Degerfors IF	2–0 (aet)	Assyriska Föreningen
IF Brommapojkarna	1–2	Mjällby AIF
Jönköpings Södra IF	0–2 (aet)	Västerås SK
Kristianstads FF	1–5	Östers IF
18 May 2006
Enköpings SK	2–4	Falkenbergs FF
FC Trollhättan	1–4	IF Elfsborg
Gefle IF	4–2	Åtvidabergs FF
Landskrona BoIS	3–0	Örgryte IS
Visby IF Gute	3–2	Örebro SK
FC Väsby United	1–0	Malmö FF
7 June 2006
Gunnilse IS	0–2	Halmstads BK
Kalmar FF	4–1	AIK
8 June 2006
IFK Göteborg	1–2	Trelleborgs FF
28 June 2006
Djurgårdens IF	2–0	GAIS
6 July 2006
Hammarby IF	1–3	Helsingborgs IF

== Fourth round ==
The 8 matches in this round were played between 22 June and 27 July 2006.

Team 1	Score	Team 2
22 June 2006
IFK Norrköping	5–4	Mjällby AIF
Västerås SK	1–2	Landskrona BoIS
6 July 2006
IF Elfsborg	2–1 (aet)	Djurgårdens IF
Falkenbergs FF	3–4	FC Väsby United
Halmstads BK	0–3	Gefle IF
Trelleborgs FF	0–4	Östers IF
26 July 2006
Visby IF Gute FK	1–2 (aet)	Kalmar FF
27 July 2006
Helsingborgs IF	3–0	Degerfors IF

== Quarter-finals ==
The 4 matches in this round were played between 3 August and 31 August 2006.

Team 1	Score	Team 2
3 August 2006
Landskrona BoIS	2–3	Gefle IF
Östers IF	2–0	FC Väsby United
19 August 2006
Helsingborgs IF	4–4 (aet); 5–3 (p)	IF Elfsborg
31 August 2006
Kalmar FF	4–2 (aet)	IFK Norrköping

== Semi-finals ==
The semi-finals were played on 19 October 2006.

Team 1	Score	Team 2
19 October 2006
Helsingborgs IF	3–0	Östers IF
Kalmar FF	1–1 (aet); 3–4 (p)	Gefle IF

== Final ==
The final was played on 11 November 2006 at the Råsunda Stadium.

11 November 2006
16:00 CET

Gefle IF	0–2	Helsingborgs IF
	Report	Shelton 28'; Stefanidis 53'

Råsunda, Solna
Attendance: 3,379
Referee: Stefan Johannesson
