= Viktor Nilsson =

Swedish footballer

Personal information
- Full name: Viktor Carl Nilsson
- Date of birth: 14 July 1993 (age 33)
- Place of birth: Sweden
- Height: 1.75 m (5 ft 9 in)
- Positions: Forward; winger

Youth career
- IFK Påryd
- –2009: Nybro IF
- 2009–2011: IF Elfsborg

Senior career*
Years	Team	Apps	(Gls)
2012–2014	Mjällby AIF	20	(0)
2013	→ Jönköpings Södra IF (loan)	13	(1)
2015–2017	IFK Värnamo	79	(0)
2018	Trelleborgs FF	4	(0)
- * Club domestic league appearances and goals as of 22:37, 9 December 2019 (UTC)

Viktor Nilsson (born 14 July 1993), sometimes spelled Victor Nilsson, is a Swedish footballer who plays as a forward.
