= Grooves (archaeology) =

Grooves carved into rock

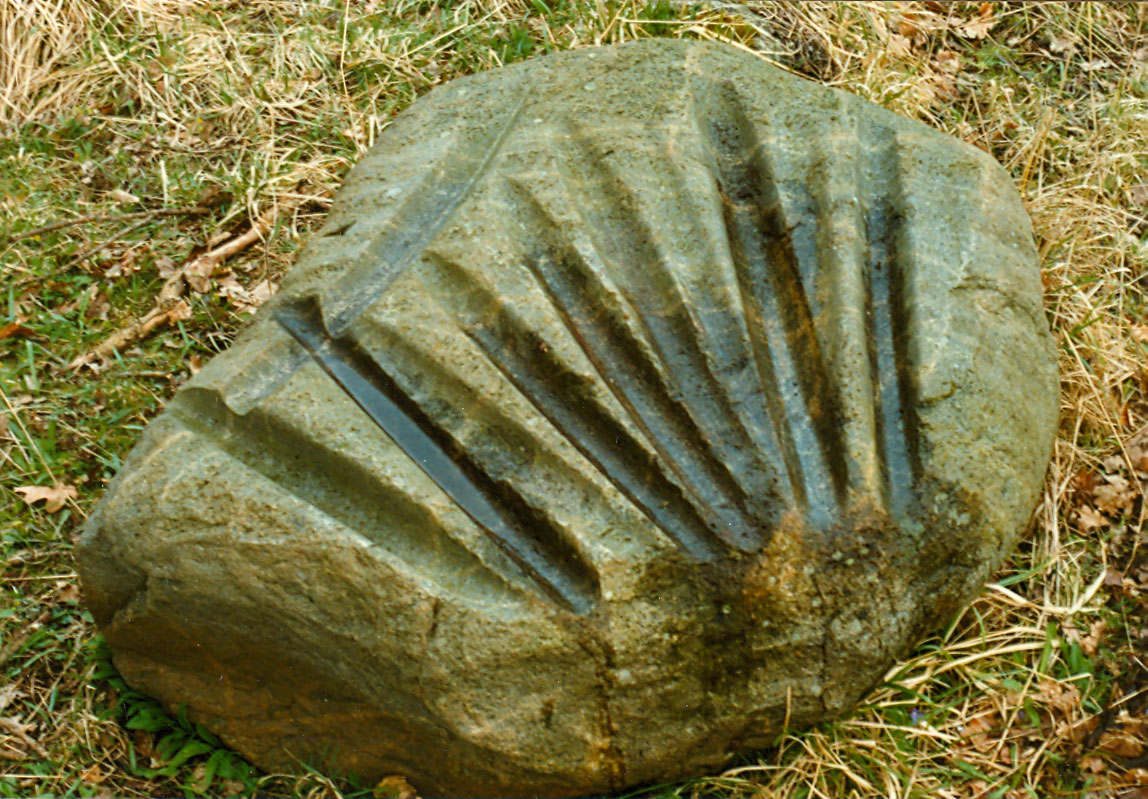
Grooves in a fan-shaped pattern and with one crossing, Gotland, Sweden

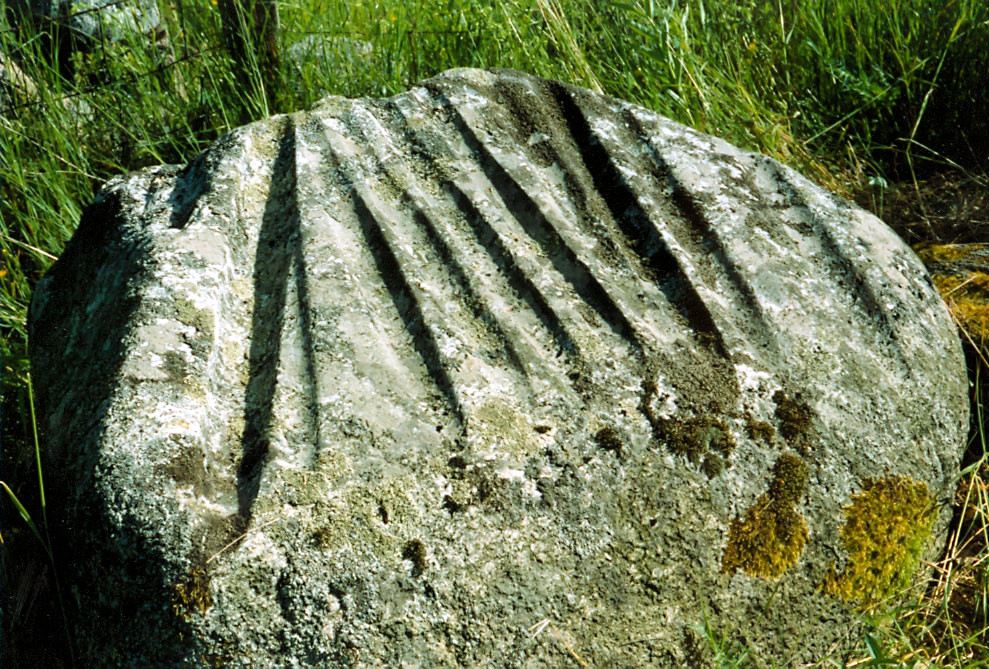
Grooves, the one at left at the edge of another one, Gotland, Sweden.

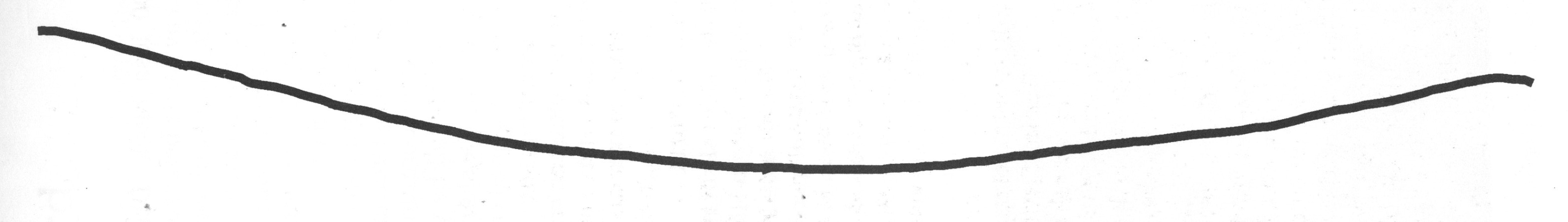
Cut of a groove measured in a groove on Gotland.

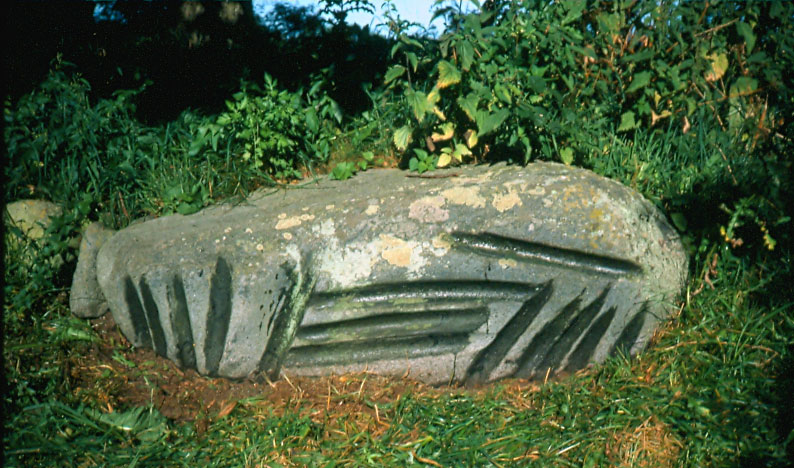
A stone with grooves that has been put in the border of a prehistoric grave. The grooves are on the side of the stone. Gotland

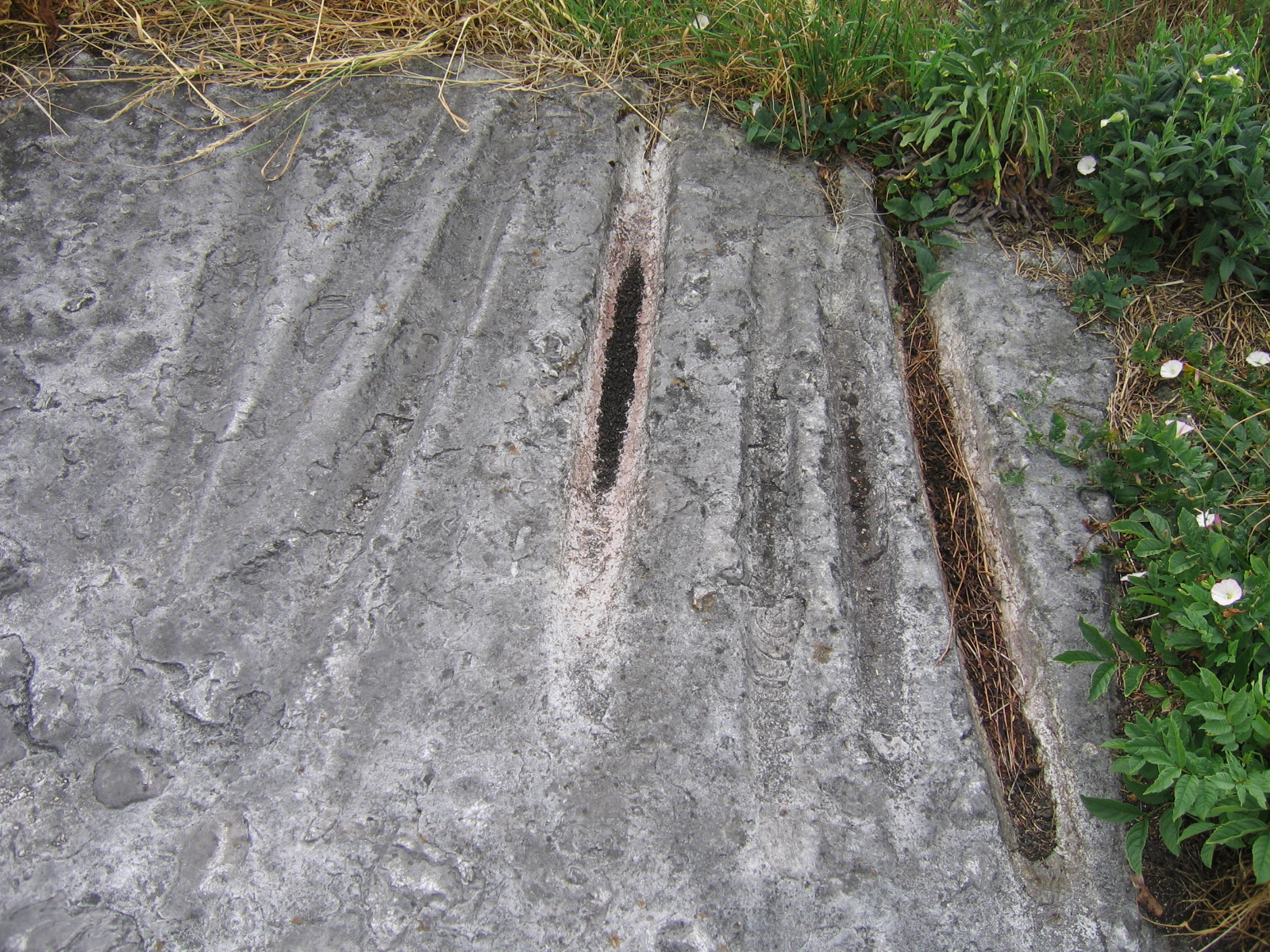
Grooves on Gotland

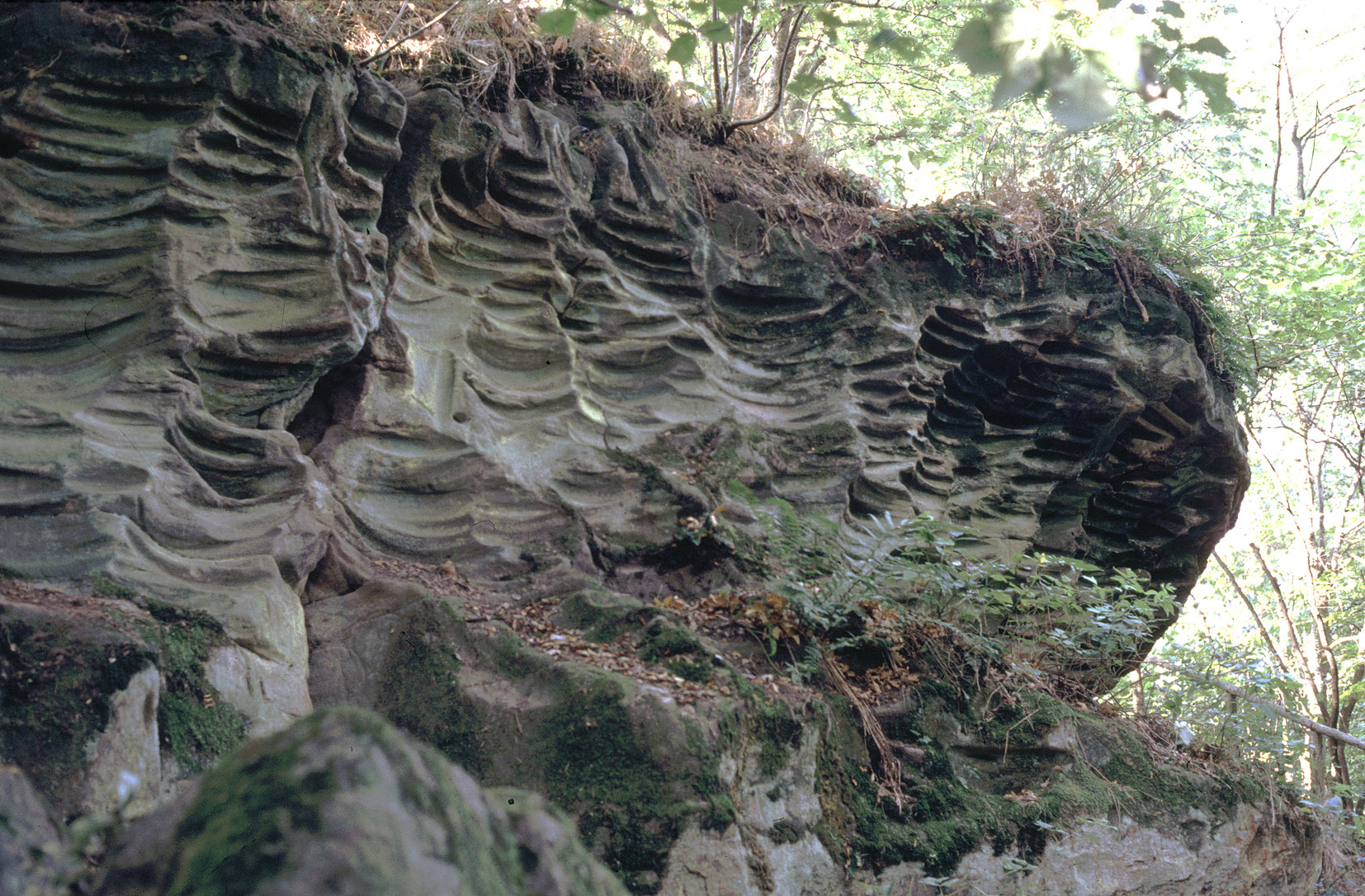
Grooves in Gantofta, Scania

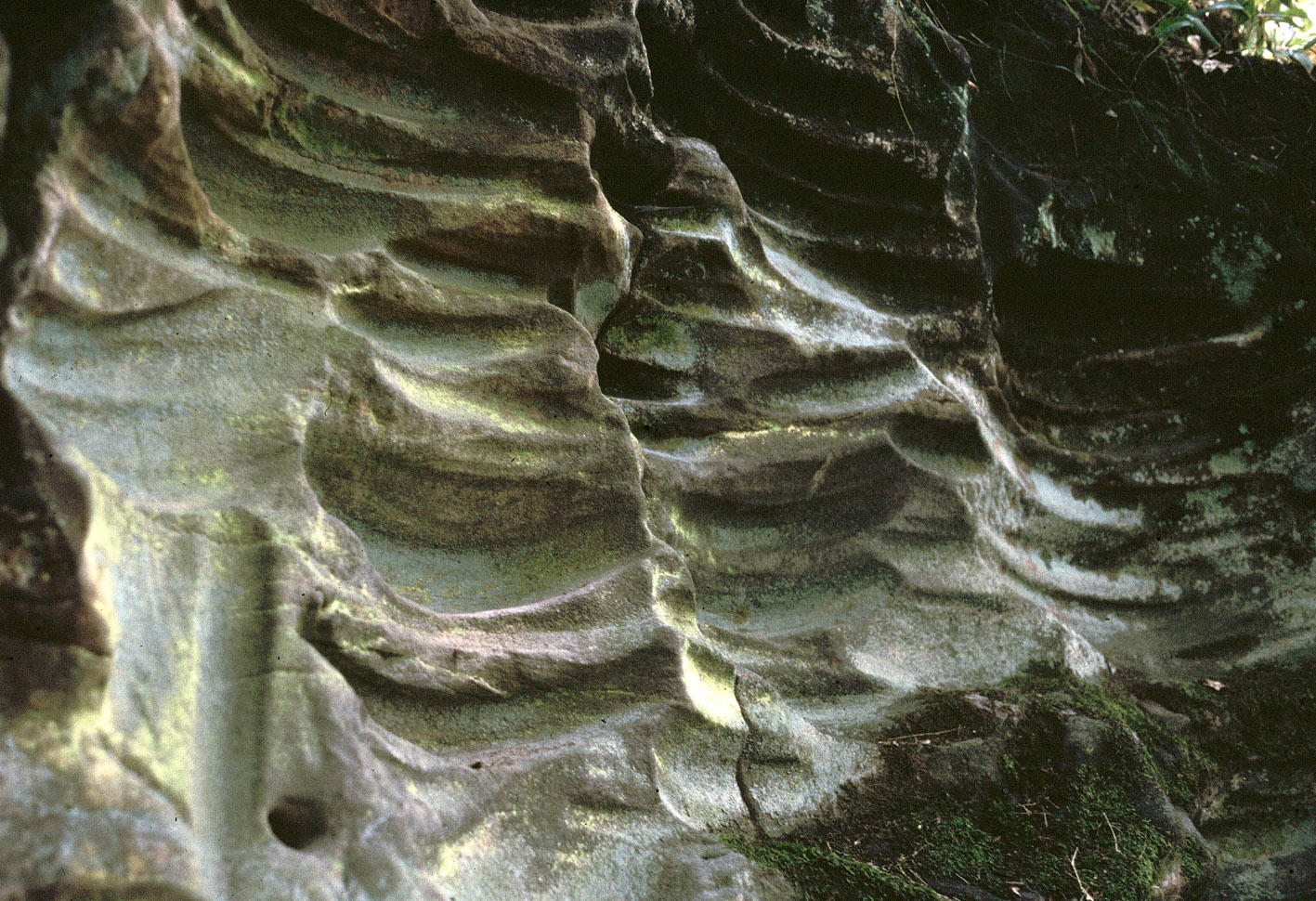
Detail of the grooves in Gantofta

There are grooves (Swedish: sliprännor, slipskåror. Sw-En translation: sharpening grooves) carved into rock in many places in Europe, and some of them appear on the Baltic Sea island of Gotland. They are common in France, where they were used to polish stone axes.

In Sweden, there are also grooves in north-western Scania and Halland. In Gantofta located 14 km (8.7 mi) south of Helsingborg a face of sandstone rock is engraved with thousands of grooves. Local tradition says they were made as whetstones.

Grooves in France date from the Neolithic and are called polissoirs. Those in l’Aube date from c. 2500 to 2000 BCE. People who built dolmens, erected menhirs and made grooves supported an archaeological culture known as Seine-Oise-Marne. The Aube district had more than 130 monuments from this period including 49 grooves before 1927. Today there are only 34 including 16 grooves. Many stones were cut into roadstones or building blocks for homes.

Grooves have also been found in Tavastia in Finland and in Luxembourg, as well as at Fyfield Down in England.

Neolithic Grooves have been found in Tamil Nadu, India.

== Gotland ==
3,600 grooves have been discovered on Gotland, of which 700 are in limestone outcrops, while the remainder are on c. 800 boulders and slabs. The grooves are 50–100 cm (20–39 in) long, c. 10 cm (3.9 in) deep and c. 10 cm (3.9 in)wide.

The grooves began to attract scholarly attention in the 1850s. At first they were called "sharpening stones", but later they received the name "sword sharpening stones". After some time, newspapers and scholarly publications began to dispute this, since the shape of the grooves makes them unfit for sharpening swords. Another reason was that by 1933, more than 500 sites with grooves had been identified on Gotland. They were evenly distributed across the island. It was also noted that they ran in different directions and often crossed each other.

The dates and function of the grooves on Gotland have seen debate in recent decades between archaeologists who argue for a High Medieval date and some industrial function, and proponents of an alternative theory who argue for a Neolithic date and a ritual calendar function. The latter support their view mainly with the idea that the direction of each groove might be given an astronomical interpretation, where each groove would mark a sightline towards a certain celestial phenomenon that may be reconstructed for a certain year during the Stone Age. The grooves under overhangs in Scania cannot have been used as sightlines in this suggested manner.

Certain late 1st-millennium picture stones on Gotland carry grooves that have been made after the relief of the stones was carved, which show the grooves to be late. Likewise with the level above current sea surface of the lowest grooved outcrops on the island, that shows them to be no older than AD 1000 judging from post-glacial shoreline displacement. It has been suggested that on one picture stone, part of the Late Iron Age decoration is carved into the bottom of a groove, meaning that this groove must be older than the picture.
