= Viktor Elm =

Swedish footballer

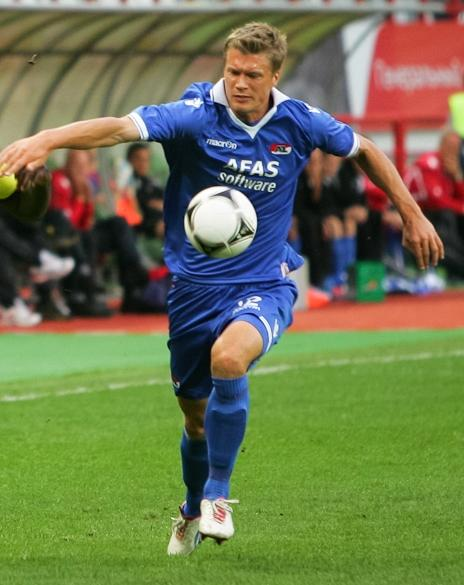
- Elm playing for AZ in 2012

Personal information
- Full name: Viktor Sebastian Elm
- Date of birth: 13 November 1985 (age 41)
- Place of birth: Kalmar, Sweden
- Height: 1.92 m (6 ft 3 1/2 in)
- Position: Centre back

Team information
- Current team: Kalmar FF
- Number: 23

Youth career
- Johansfors IF
- Nybro IF

Senior career*
Years	Team	Apps	(Gls)
2004–2005	Falkenbergs FF	32	(8)
2006–2008	Kalmar FF	78	(24)
2009–2012	Heerenveen	102	(15)
2012–2015	AZ	83	(6)
2015–2020	Kalmar FF	151	(16)
Total		446	(69)

International career
2006	Sweden U21	2	(0)
2008–2011	Sweden	10	(0)
- * Club domestic league appearances and goals as of 31 December 2020

Viktor Sebastian Elm (born 13 November 1985) is a Swedish former professional footballer who played as a centre-back and midfielder. He is best remembered for his time with Kalmar FF with which he won the 2007 Svenska Cupen and 2008 Allsvenskan. He also represented Heerenveen and AZ in the Netherlands. A full international between 2008 and 2011, he won 10 caps for the Sweden national team.

He is the older brother of Rasmus Elm and the younger brother of David Elm, both of them also former footballers.

== Club career ==
=== Falkenbergs FF ===
Elm played 32 matches scoring 8 goals in 28 games in the 2005 season.

=== Kalmar FF ===
Elm joined Kalmar FF from Falkenbergs FF before the 2006 season, where his younger brother Rasmus was a player and at the end of the season his older brother David followed from Falkenbergs FF. On 9 April 2007 they became only the second trio of brothers to be fielded at the same time for one team in Allsvenskan, a feat the five Nordahl brothers never managed.

Viktor and his brothers played a big part in the second part of the 2007 season which led to Kalmar equalling their best result in Allsvenskan from 1985 at second place and winning their third Swedish Cup, the first time since 1987.

In the 2008 season Elm was even more instrumental in Kalmars first league title, scoring 15 goals including four in the last home game to effectively seal the title and winning the award "Swedish Midfielder of the Year". In Kalmars UEFA Cup run Elm scored the winning goal for against Feyenoord in the first leg of the 2008–09 UEFA Cup First round.

At the end of the 2008 season Elm's contract was expired and was a free agent after 24 goals in 78 appearances for the Röda bröder.

=== SC Heerenveen ===
He signed with Dutch side SC Heerenveen on a bosman during the fall of 2008 and joined the team when the transfer window opened in January 2009. He scored his first two goals for the club against Feyenoord in the Fourth Round of the 2008–09 KNVB Cup.

His first Eredivisie goal came on 8 February 2009, in a match against NAC Breda.

After the 2012 season Elm was out of a contract at sc Heerenveen and after 102 appearances and 15 goals for De Superfriezen decided it was time for a new challenge.

=== AZ Alkmaar ===
In June 2012 Elm signed a four-year deal at AZ Alkmaar, teaming up with his brother Rasmus for the first time since their stint at Kalmar FF.

He made his official debut in a 2–2 draw against Ajax on 12 August 2012. He scored his first hattrick on 27 September in a KNVB Cup 4–1 win against SC Veendam. On 30 September he scored his first league goal in a 3–3 draw against RKC Waalwijk. He captained AZ for the first time against VVV Venlo on 25 January 2013 (4–1 win) because Maarten Martens was injured and Nick Viergever was suspended. Elm scored 5 goals in the KNVB Cup, as AZ won the cup for the 4th time in club history and scored 3 in the League.

For the 2013–14 season Elm appeared 49 times out of 58 competitive games, including 11 games en route to the Europa League semi-final. Elm scored 3 goals in the League.

=== Return to Kalmar FF ===
On 30 March 2015, it was announced that Elm returned to his former club Kalmar FF, where he reunited with his brothers David and Rasmus. He announced his retirement from professional football on 16 December 2020.

== International career ==
Elm made his début for the Sweden national team against the United States on 19 January 2008. Elm made his 2010 FIFA World Cup qualification début on 6 June 2009 in the 0–1 defeat against Denmark, coming on as a substitute for Daniel Andersson in the 68th minute.

== Career statistics ==
Club performance			League		Cup		Continental		Other		Total	
Club	Season	League	Apps	Goals	Apps	Goals	Apps	Goals	Apps	Goals	Apps	Goal
Sweden			League		Svenska Cupen		Europe		Other		Total	
Falkenbergs FF	2004	Superettan	4	0	0	0					4	0
Falkenbergs FF	2005	Superettan	28	8	0	0					28	8
Kalmar FF	2006	Allsvenskan	24	5	4	0	6	1			34	6
Kalmar FF	2007	Allsvenskan	24	4	4	0					28	4
Kalmar FF	2008	Allsvenskan	30	15	5	3	5	1	1	0	41	19
Netherlands			League		KNVB Cup		Europe		Other		Total	
Heerenveen	2008–09	Eredivisie	12	4	4	4					16	8
Heerenveen	2009–10	Eredivisie	28	5	2	2	6	1	1	0	37	8
Heerenveen	2010–11	Eredivisie	17	3	1	1					18	4
Sweden			110	32	13	3	11	2	1	0	135	37
Netherlands			57	12	7	7	6	1	1	0	71	20
Career Total			160	41	20	10	17	3	2	0	199	54

== Honours ==
Kalmar FF

- Allsvenskan: 2008
- Svenska Cupen: 2007

SC Heerenveen

- KNVB Cup: 2008–09

AZ

- KNVB Cup: 2012–13

Individual

- Swedish Midfielder of the Year: 2008
