= Rasmus Elm =

Swedish footballer

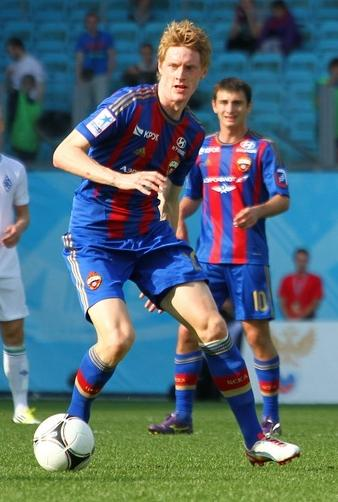
- With CSKA Moscow in 2012

Personal information
- Full name: Rasmus Christoffer Elm
- Date of birth: 17 March 1988 (age 38)
- Place of birth: Kalmar, Sweden
- Height: 1.84 m (6 ft 0 in)
- Position: Midfielder

Team information
- Current team: Kalmar FF (assistant)

Youth career
- Johansfors IF
- Emmaboda IS

Senior career*
Years	Team	Apps	(Gls)
2005–2009	Kalmar FF	96	(19)
2009–2012	AZ	83	(18)
2012–2015	CSKA Moscow	47	(5)
2015–2019	Kalmar FF	72	(2)
Total		298	(44)

International career
2003–2005	Sweden U17	15	(0)
2005–2007	Sweden U19	19	(5)
2007–2010	Sweden U21	18	(0)
2009–2013	Sweden	39	(4)

Managerial career
- 2020–: Kalmar FF (assistant)
- * Club domestic league appearances and goals

Rasmus Christoffer Elm (born 17 March 1988) is a Swedish former professional footballer who played as a midfielder. He is currently the assistant coach of Kalmar FF. During his career, he played for Kalmar FF in Sweden, for AZ in the Netherlands and the Russian side CSKA Moscow. Elm earned 39 caps for Sweden between 2009 and 2013 and competed at UEFA Euro 2012. He is the younger brother of Viktor and David Elm.

== Club career ==
=== Early career ===
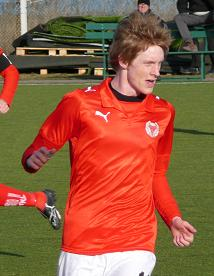
Elm playing for Kalmar FF

In his childhood, Elm played for Johansfors IF and Emmaboda IS, before he signed in January 2005 for Kalmar FF.

=== Kalmar FF ===
In four-and-a-half years with the Allsvenskan club, Elm played 96 games and scored 17 goals. While at Kalmar, he helped the team win the 2007 Svenska Cupen, the 2008 Allsvenskan, and the 2009 Svenska Supercupen.

=== AZ ===
On 27 August 2009, Elm signed a four-year deal with Eredivisie side AZ Alkmaar. He made his debut on 12 September 2009 in the 2–1 loss against ADO Den Haag.

Former Sweden men's national team coach Lars Lagerbäck once commented that Elm was the biggest talent Sweden has produced since Zlatan Ibrahimović. While suffering from injuries and illness during his first two seasons in AZ, Elm experience a successful 2011–12 season. He received several player of the match awards during that season and was praised by the press and the fans for his passing and free kicks as well as his goal scoring.

Elm played a total of 83 matches for AZ before he left the club during the summer of 2012.

=== CSKA Moscow ===
On 30 July 2012, Elm signed a three-year contract with Russian Premier League side CSKA Moscow, taking the shirt number 20. On 21 October 2012, he scored his first goal for CSKA after converting a penalty at home against Rubin Kazan in a 2–0 victory. On 3 January 2015, Elm had his contract with CSKA terminated by mutual consent in order to recover from a long-term stomach illness that had left him unable to train with the club.

=== Return to Kalmar FF and retirement ===
Elm returned to Kalmar FF and Sweden ahead of the 2015 Allsvenskan season. In early 2020, Elm announced his retirement from professional football, citing health issues related to his stomach illness.

== International career ==
Elm was the captain of the Swedish under-19 squad until August 2007, when he made his debut for the U21 squad. On 11 February 2009, Elm scored his first goal for the Swedish senior team in a friendly against Austria. He represented Sweden at Euro 2012. On 16 October 2012, he scored the fourth and equalising goal in Sweden's remarkable 4–4 draw in Berlin against Germany in 2014 FIFA World Cup qualification – UEFA Group C. The Swedes were losing 0–4 until the last 29 minutes of the game when a flurry of Swedish goals were capped by the stoppage time goal from Elm. The result was hailed as one of the greatest sporting achievements in Swedish history.

== Personal life ==
Both of his siblings have also played professional football: David, who previously played for Fulham, and his other brother Viktor, who previously played for the Dutch club AZ.

== Career statistics ==
=== Club ===
As of 19 March 2021

Club	Season	League			Cup		Europe		Total	
Club	Season	Division	Apps	Goals	Apps	Goals	Apps	Goals	Apps	Goals
Kalmar FF	2005	Allsvenskan	7	0	0	0	—		7	0
Kalmar FF	2006	Allsvenskan	23	1	0	0	—		23	1
Kalmar FF	2007	Allsvenskan	20	4	0	0	—		20	4
Kalmar FF	2008	Allsvenskan	27	5	2	0	2	0	31	5
Kalmar FF	2009	Allsvenskan	19	9	3	1	2	2	24	12
Kalmar FF	Total		96	19	5	1	4	2	105	22
AZ Alkmaar	2009–10	Eredivisie	23	3	3	0	0	0	26	3
AZ Alkmaar	2010–11	Eredivisie	28	5	3	1	4	0	35	6
AZ Alkmaar	2011–12	Eredivisie	32	10	4	1	16	2	52	13
AZ Alkmaar	Total		83	18	10	2	20	2	113	22
CSKA Moscow	2012–13	Russian Premier League	26	5	3	0	2	0	31	5
CSKA Moscow	2013–14	Russian Premier League	21	0	4	0	4	0	29	0
CSKA Moscow	Total		47	5	7	0	6	0	60	5
Kalmar FF	2015	Allsvenskan	12	0	1	0	—		13	0
Kalmar FF	2016	Allsvenskan	18	1	4	1	—		22	2
Kalmar FF	2017	Allsvenskan	3	0	3	0	—		6	0
Kalmar FF	2018	Allsvenskan	19	1	1	0	—		20	1
Kalmar FF	2019	Allsvenskan	20	0	0	0	—		20	0
Kalmar FF	Total		72	2	9	1	0	0	83	3
Career Total			298	44	31	4	30	4	361	52

=== International ===
Appearances and goals by national team and year
National team	Year	Apps	Goals
Sweden	2009	11	1
Sweden	2010	2	0
Sweden	2011	8	0
Sweden	2012	10	2
Sweden	2013	8	1
Total		39	4

International goals

Sweden's goal tally listed first. The score column shows the score after each Elm goal.

#	Date	Venue	Opponent	Score	Result	Competition
1.	11 February 2009	UPC-Arena, Graz, Austria	Austria	1–0	2–0	Friendly match
2.	11 September 2012	Swedbank Stadion, Malmö, Sweden	Kazakhstan	1–0	2–0	2014 FIFA World Cup qualification
3.	16 October 2012	Olympic Stadium, Berlin, Germany	Germany	4–4	4–4	2014 FIFA World Cup qualification
4.	6 February 2013	Friends Arena, Solna, Sweden	Argentina	2–3	2–3	Friendly match

== Honours ==
Kalmar FF

- Allsvenskan: 2008
- Svenska Cupen: 2007
- Svenska Supercupen: 2009

CSKA Moscow

- Russian Premier League: 2012–13, 2013–14
- Russian Cup: 2012–13
- Russian Super Cup: 2013, 2014

Individual

- Stor Grabb: 2012
