= Gantoftadösen =

Dolmen in Helsingborg, Sweden

Gantoftadosen
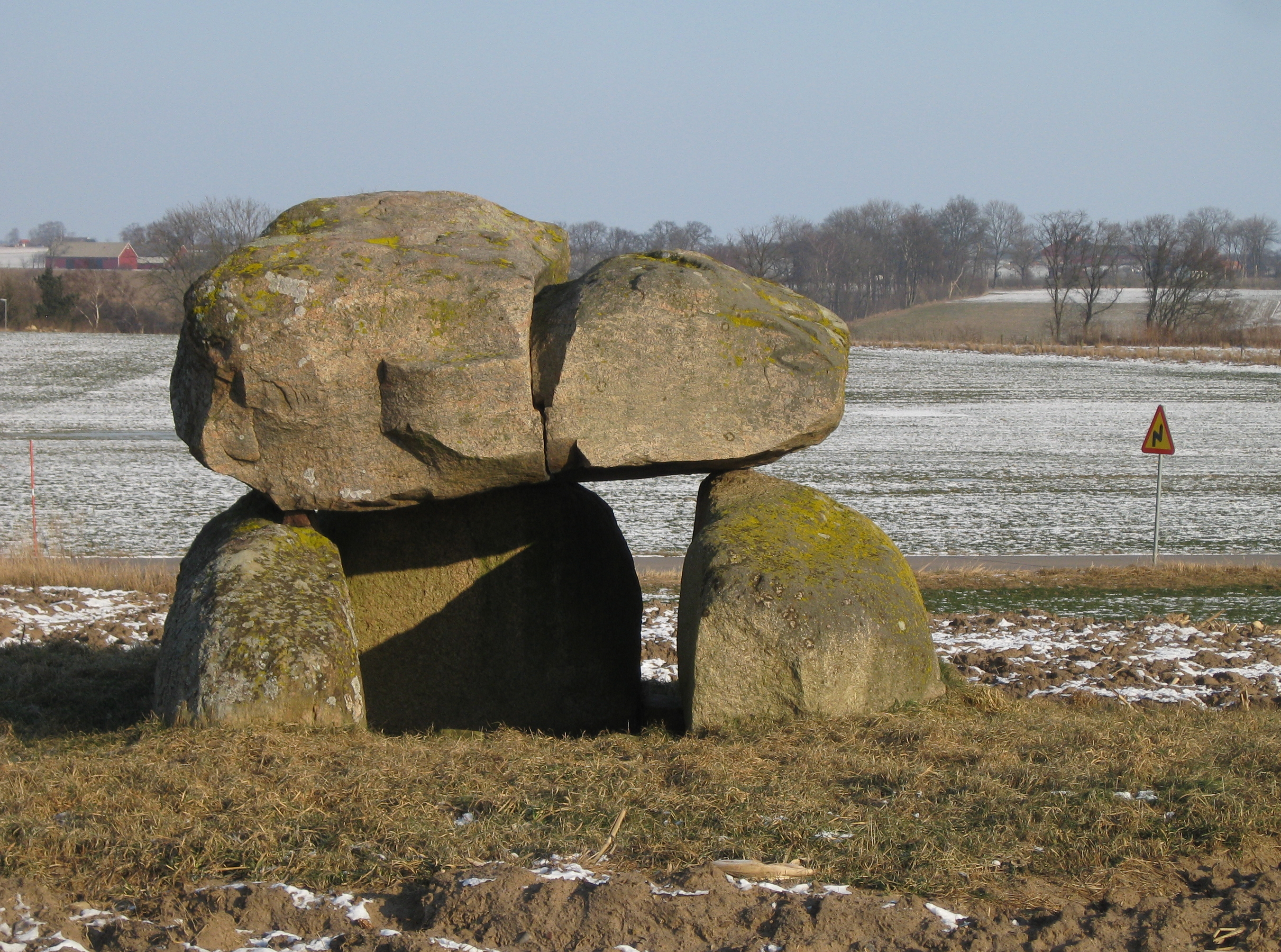
- The dolmen in 2012
- Interactive map of Gantoftadosen
- 55°59′3″N 12°48′28″E
- Type: Dolmen
- Location: Skane, Sweden

History
- Built: c. 3150 BC

Site notes
- Material: Stone
- Height: c. 1.5 m (4 ft 11 in)
- Length: c. 2.8 m (9 ft 2 in)
- Width: c. 1.4 m (4 ft 7 in)

Gantoftadösen (or Jättestugan - "giant's home") is a partially destroyed dolmen in the area of Helsingborg in Scania, Sweden. The dolmen is registered with the RAÄ as Kvistofta 14:1 and was erected between 3500 and 2800 BC by members of the Funnelbeaker culture (TBK; Swedish: Trattbägarkulturen).

The rectangular chamber was about 2.8 m long and 1.4 m wide. Three large support stones hold up a meter thick roof stone of 2.5 x 2.5 m, which is partially split in the middle. On the roof stone (Swedish: takhällen) are nine cup marks, the most common form of Nordish petroglyph.

== See also ==
- Sliprännor i Gantofta

== Bibliography ==
- Lars Bägerfeldt: Megalitgravarna i Sverige. Typ, tid, rum och social miljö. 2. Ed., Arkeo Förlaget, Gamleby 1992, ISBN 91-86742-45-0.
- Karsten Kjer Michaelsen: Politikens bog om Danmarks oldtid. Politiken, Kopenhagen 2002, ISBN 87-567-6458-8, S. 253 (= Politikens håndbøger).
- Christopher Tilley: The Dolmens and Passage graves of Sweden: An Introduction and guide. 2009
