= Gantofta IF =

Swedish football club

- Full name: Gantofta Idrottsförening
- Founded: 1942
- Ground: Stendösvallen; Gantofta; Sweden
- Chairman: Kenny Norbeck
- League: Division 5 Skåne Västra
Home colours	Away colours

Gantofta IF is a Swedish football club located in Gantofta.

== Background ==
Gantofta Idrottsförening were formed in 1942 but there most successful period has been over the last decade when they progressed from Division 6 in 2000 to Division 2 in 2006 and then spent 2 further seasons in Division 3. Sadly three relegations over the last 4 seasons will see GIF back in Division 6 for the 2012 season.

In 2011 Gantofta IF has played in Division 5 Skåne Västra which is the seventh tier of Swedish football. They play their home matches at the Stendösvallen in Gantofta.

The club is affiliated to Skånes Fotbollförbund. Gantofta IF played in the 2006 Svenska Cupen winning 4–1 away to Oxie IF in the first round before losing 1–2 at home to Kristianstads FF in the second round. In the following year in the 2007 Svenska Cupen GIF won 4–1 away to Furulunds IK in the first round before losing 0–3 at home to Umeå FC in the second round in front of 200 spectators.

== Season to season ==
Season	Level	Division	Section	Position	Movements
1999	Tier 7	Division 6	Skåne Nordvästra B	5th	
2000	Tier 7	Division 6	Skåne Nordvästra B	1st	Promoted
2001	Tier 6	Division 5	Skåne Nordvästra	7th	
2002	Tier 6	Division 5	Skåne Mellersta	1st	Promoted
2003	Tier 5	Division 4	Skåne Västra	8th	
2004	Tier 5	Division 4	Skåne Västra	3rd	Promotion Playoffs – Promoted
2005	Tier 4	Division 3	Södra Götaland	4th	Promotion Playoffs – Promoted
2006*	Tier 4	Division 2	Södra Götaland	10th	Relegation Playoffs – Relegated
2007	Tier 5	Division 3	Sydvästra Götaland	8th	
2008	Tier 5	Division 3	Södra Götaland	10th	Relegated
2009	Tier 6	Division 4	Skåne Västra	5th	
2010	Tier 6	Division 4	Skåne Nordvästra	12th	Relegated
2011	Tier 7	Division 5	Skåne Västra	12th	Relegated

* League restructuring in 2006 resulted in a new division being created at Tier 3 and subsequent divisions dropping a level.
