= Furulund =

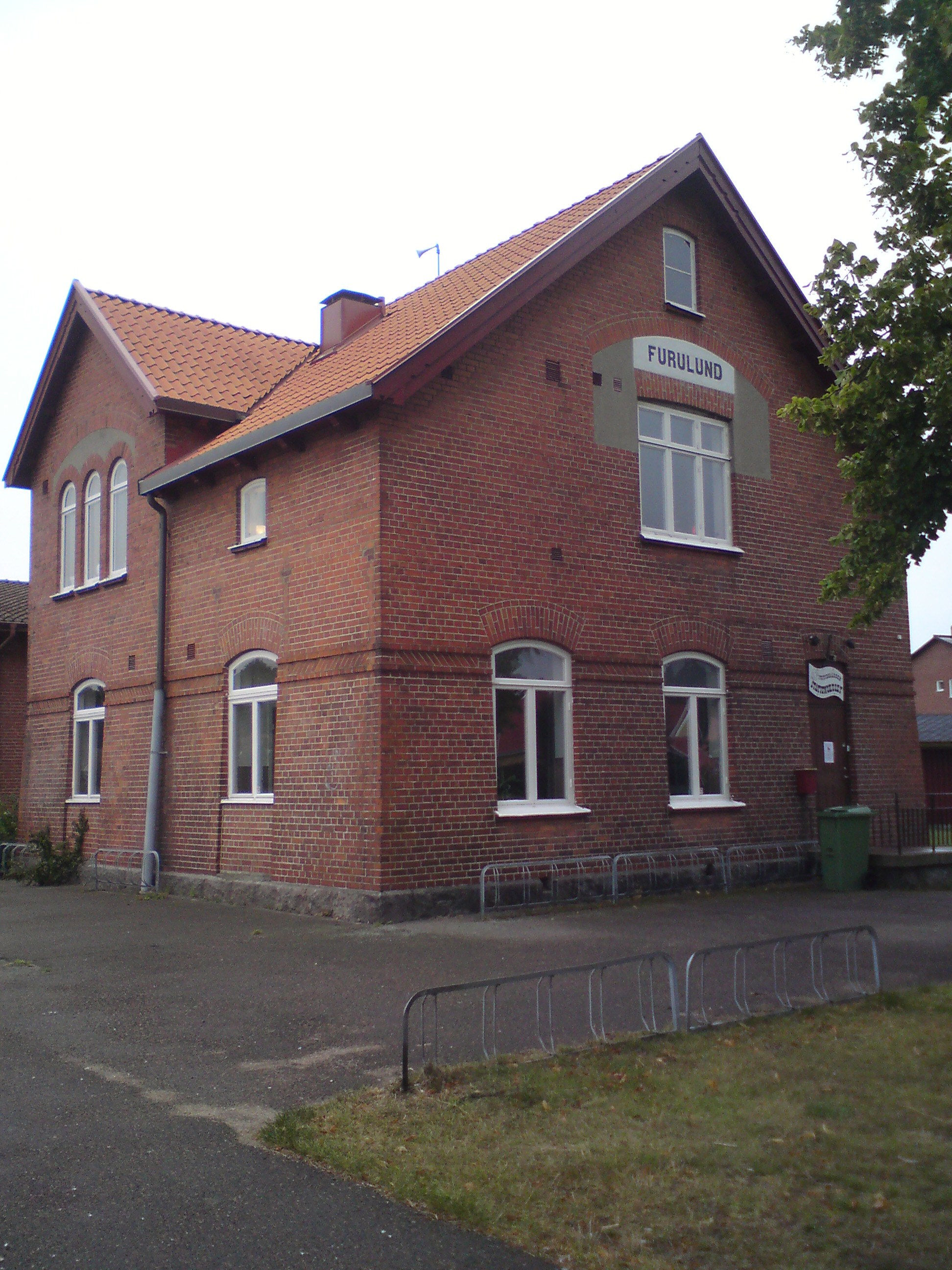
- Furulund train station

- Location within Skåne Location within Sweden
- Coordinates: 55°46′N 13°06′E
- Country: Sweden
- Province: Skåne
- County: Skåne County
- Municipality: Kävlinge Municipality

Area
  - Total: 2.80 km^{2} (1.08 sq mi)

Population (31 December 2024)
  - Total: 4,667
  - Density: 1,495/km^{2} (3,870/sq mi)
- Time zone: UTC+1 (CET)
  - Summer (DST): UTC+2 (CEST)

Furulund is a locality situated in Kävlinge Municipality, Skåne County, Sweden with 4,667 inhabitants in 2024.

Furulunds IK football club is located here at Ljunvalla and Furulund skout kår is also located here at Friluftsgatan.
