= David Elm (footballer) =

Swedish footballer

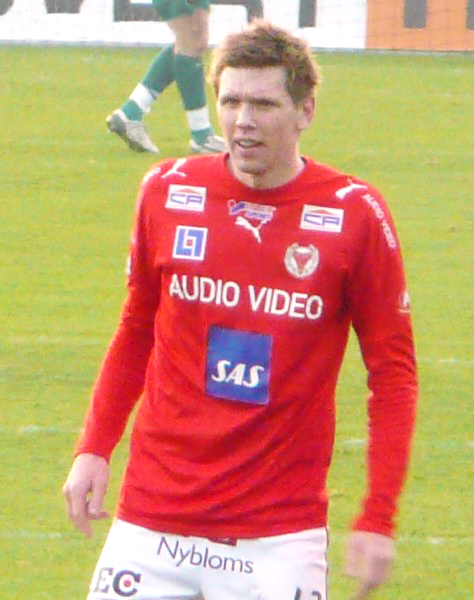
- Elm playing for Kalmar FF in 2007

Personal information
- Full name: David Elm
- Date of birth: 10 January 1983 (age 43)
- Place of birth: Broakulla, Sweden
- Height: 1.91 m (6 ft 3 in)
- Position: Striker

Youth career
- –1999: Johansfors IF
- 1999–2000: Helsingborgs IF
- 2001–2003: Nybro IF
- 2003: Emmaboda IS

Senior career*
Years	Team	Apps	(Gls)
2004–2006	Falkenbergs FF	68	(14)
2007–2009	Kalmar FF	65	(12)
2009–2011	Fulham	10	(1)
2011–2013	Elfsborg	60	(12)
2013–2017	Kalmar FF	75	(15)
2018	Johansfors IF	13	(7)
Total		291	(61)
- * Club domestic league appearances and goals as of 10 January 2018

David Elm (born 10 January 1983) is a Swedish former professional footballer who played as a striker. He played professionally for the Swedish clubs Kalmar FF, Falkenbergs FF and IF Elfsborg – and also played for Fulham in the English Premier League during a career that spanned between 2004 and 2017.

He is the older brother of fellow former footballers Rasmus Elm and Viktor Elm.

== Club career ==
=== Early career ===
Elm began his career playing for youth clubs Johansfors IF and Emmaboda IS, alongside his younger brothers Rasmus and Viktor (although he went on to play for Nybro IF).

=== Falkenbergs FF ===
Elm moved to Superettan club Falkenbergs FF on a free transfer in 2004. Upon his arrival, he quickly established himself as first-choice. In his time there, he scored a total of 14 goals on 68 matches. He left Falkenbergs FF for Allsvenskan club Kalmar FF at the end of the 2006 season.

=== Kalmar FF ===
At Kalmar FF, Elm was mostly used as a substitute during his first season. However, after several departures, he became first-choice in the 2008 season, contributing 7 goals in 27 games, which saw Kalmar win the Swedish Cup. Kalmar also went on to win Allsvenskan for the first time in the club's history. This led to a possible move to Fulham.

=== Fulham ===
On 1 September 2009, Elm signed for Premier League side Fulham for an undisclosed fee, thought to be around £500,000. Spokesman Patrick Mörk stated that Fulham chief scout Barry Simmonds held talks with Elm. He also stated that Roy Hodgson had personally attended the second leg between Kalmar and Hungarian club Debrecen in the Champions League first qualifying match, which Hodgson was interested in. He also suggests that Elm might come to be featured in the squad as a midfielder. On 23 September 2009, Elm made his Fulham debut on in a 2–1 away defeat to Manchester City in the League Cup third round, replacing Eddie Johnson in the 91st minute. On 9 February 2010, Elm scored his first goal for Fulham, netting the second in a 3–0 home win over Burnley in the Premier League, he also assisted Danny Murphy for Fulham's first goal. At the end of the 2009–10 season, he signed a contract extension lasting until the end of the 2011–12 season.

=== Elfsborg ===
On 24 January 2011, Elm signed a five-year contract with Swedish club IF Elfsborg. The estimated transfer sum was around £500,000- £1,000,000, Elm transferred from Fulham due to lack of playing time. Elm was bought by Elfsborg because they had recently sold their top striker Denni Avdic to Werder Bremen for around £2,500,000 – £3,000,000. The similarities were the height of both of the players, even if David is more of a target man, exactly what the former head coach Magnus Haglund was looking for.

During Elm's first season he played 25 matches, scored 7 times and assisted two times. He had a hard time in the beginning to get into the first squad, but after he scored in important matches he gained trust from the coach and the audience. In the 2010–11 season he scored the winning goal in a 3–2 derby win against IFK Göteborg, netting in the 93rd minute.

=== Return to Kalmar FF and retirement ===
He returned to Kalmar FF during the summer of 2013. He retired from professional football after the 2017 season. He spent one season with his boyhood club Johansfors IF in Division 6 in 2018.

== Style of play ==
Elm's favourite playing position is supporting striker, connecting his striking partner, with the wingers. At Fulham, his preferred partnership was with Andrew Johnson, creating what was known as 'Jelm'. He has been compared to Peter Crouch, tall, strong and good with the head.

== Personal life ==
He has two brothers, Rasmus and Viktor who both plays for Kalmar FF. Elm is a fan of Swedish indie band Kent and The Boss. He has a child named Alve.

== Honours ==
Kalmar FF

- Allsvenskan: 2008
- Svenska Cupen: 2007

Elfsborg

- Allsvenskan: 2012
