= Polissoir =

Neolithic stone tool

A polissoir (French for "polisher") or polishing stone is a Neolithic stone tool used for polishing and sharpening stone objects, particularly axes. Polissoirs contrast with grindstones, of a later period, which are stones used to grind or sharpen ferrous objects. These artifacts, dating to approximately 5,000 years ago, provide insight into the technological advancements and craftsmanship of Neolithic societies.

== History and characteristics ==
=== Characteristics ===
Polissoirs are typically large stones with smooth, concave surfaces or grooves specifically designed for polishing stone objects. They are often made from hard and abrasive rocks such as sandstone, granite, or quartzite, which were effective for grinding and shaping the edges of stone tools. The surface of a polissoir often displays distinctive wear patterns resulting from the back-and-forth motion used to refine tool edges.

Polissoirs can be classified into two main types: earthfast and portable. Earthfast polissoirs are large, immovable, and found in their original positions. Portable polissoirs are ones that could be moved and used in different locations.

=== Function ===
Neolithic people used polissoirs to sharpen and polish stone tools, particularly axes, adzes, and chisels. The process involved rubbing or grinding the surface of stone implements against the polissoir, which helped refine and sharpen their cutting edges. This helped maintain the functionality of stone tools, which were essential for activities such as clearing woodlands, building houses, and creating monuments.

=== Distribution and discovery ===
Polissoirs have been found in various parts of Europe, with a significant concentration in France. In England, they are relatively rare, with only two undisturbed polissoirs found in their original positions. A notable discovery was made in July 2023 in the Valley of Stones National Nature Reserve in Dorset, England, where archaeologists unearthed a polissoir dating back over 5,000 years.

=== Archaeological significance ===
The discovery of polissoirs at archaeological sites offers information about the tools, techniques, and skills ancient communities used. For example, polissoirs demonstrate the methodical, multi-stage nature of Neolithic tool production during the Neolithic Revolution. The grooves and surfaces of polissoirs show that craftspeople followed specific sequences: rough shaping, then progressive refinement through finer abrasion, and finally polishing. This challenges earlier assumptions about "primitive" manufacturing methods.

Polissoirs have also provided evidence of specialized production areas and potentially early "workshops." The location of fixed polissoirs, particularly large examples in France like those in the Forest of Carnelle, suggests these were communal working sites where multiple people could work simultaneously. This points to more organized production systems than previously thought. Additionally, polissoirs provide evidence of deliberate selection of materials for both polissoirs and the tools they polished, indicating an understanding of the properties of different types of stone. The consistency of the grooves and working surfaces across different sites suggests shared knowledge and techniques across communities, indicating networks of technological learning and cultural transmission.

The wear patterns on polissoirs have helped archaeologists understand the specific techniques used to create polished stone axes and other tools. Different types of grooves and surfaces indicate various motions and pressures were used systematically, revealing sophisticated knowledge of how different stones respond to different polishing techniques.

Polissoirs are also valuable because they are typically too large to move and often remain in their original locations, providing fixed points in the Neolithic landscape that help us understand how people moved through and used their environment.

== Gallery ==
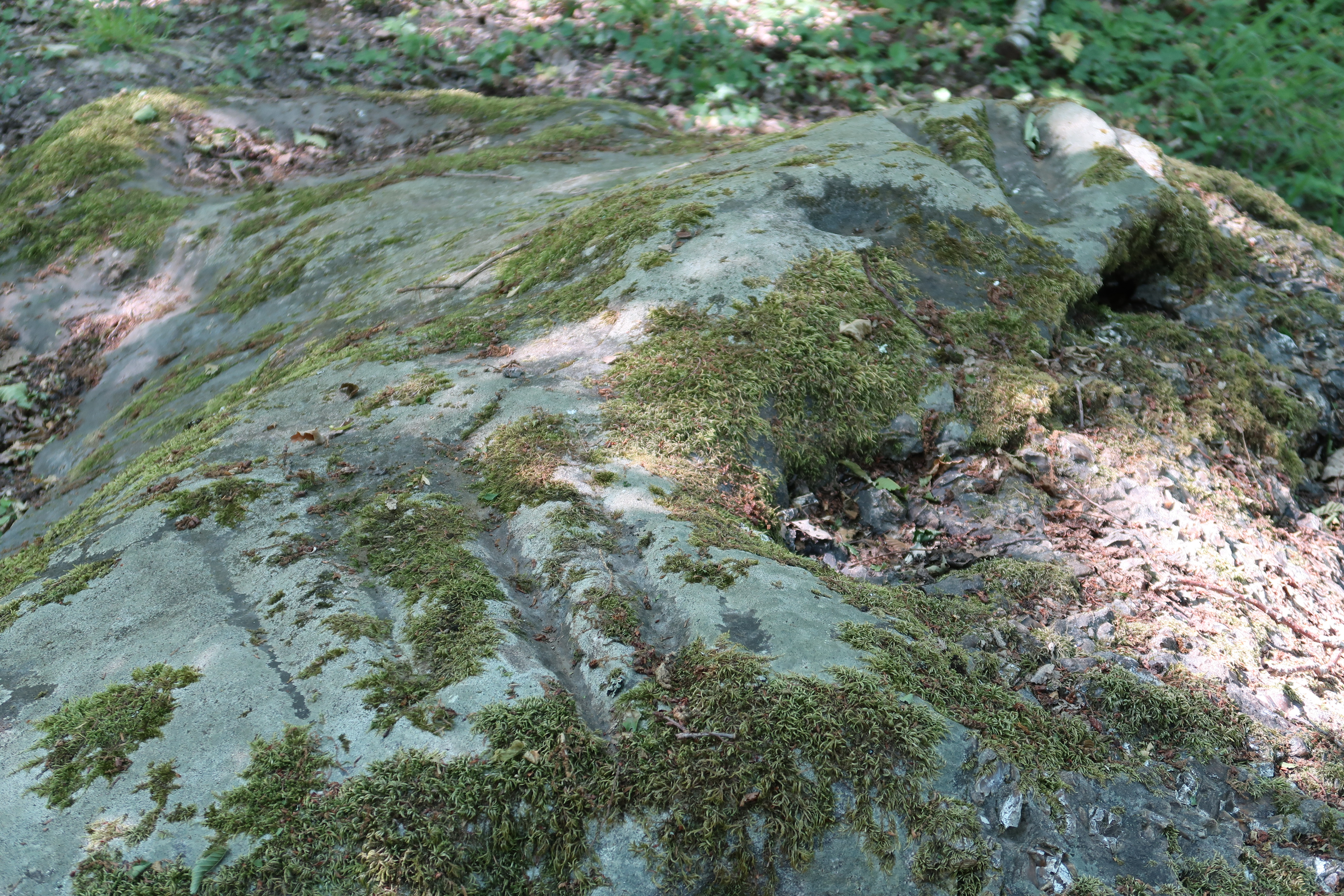
Polissoir du Sauvageon, France

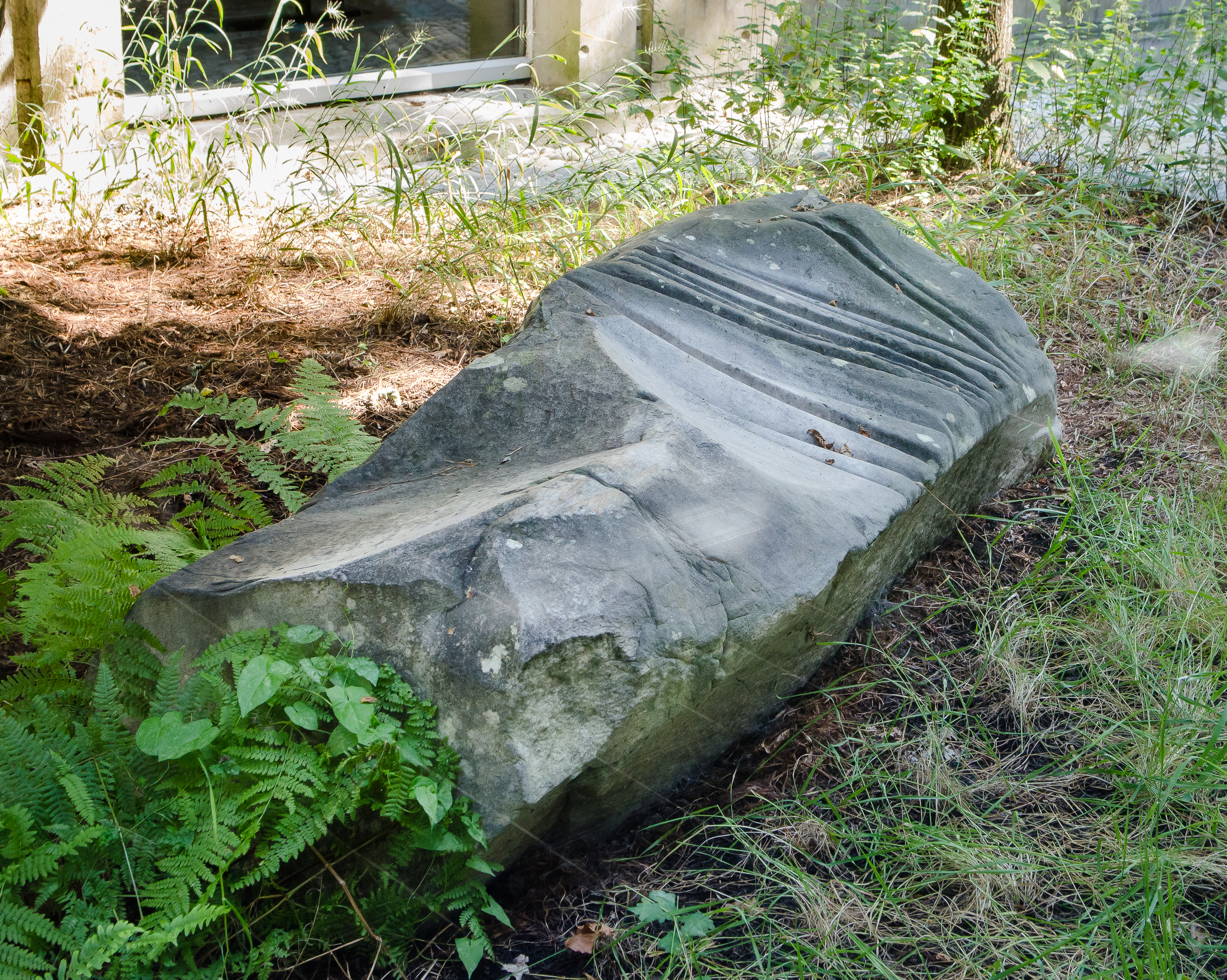
A polissoir at the museum in Nemours, France

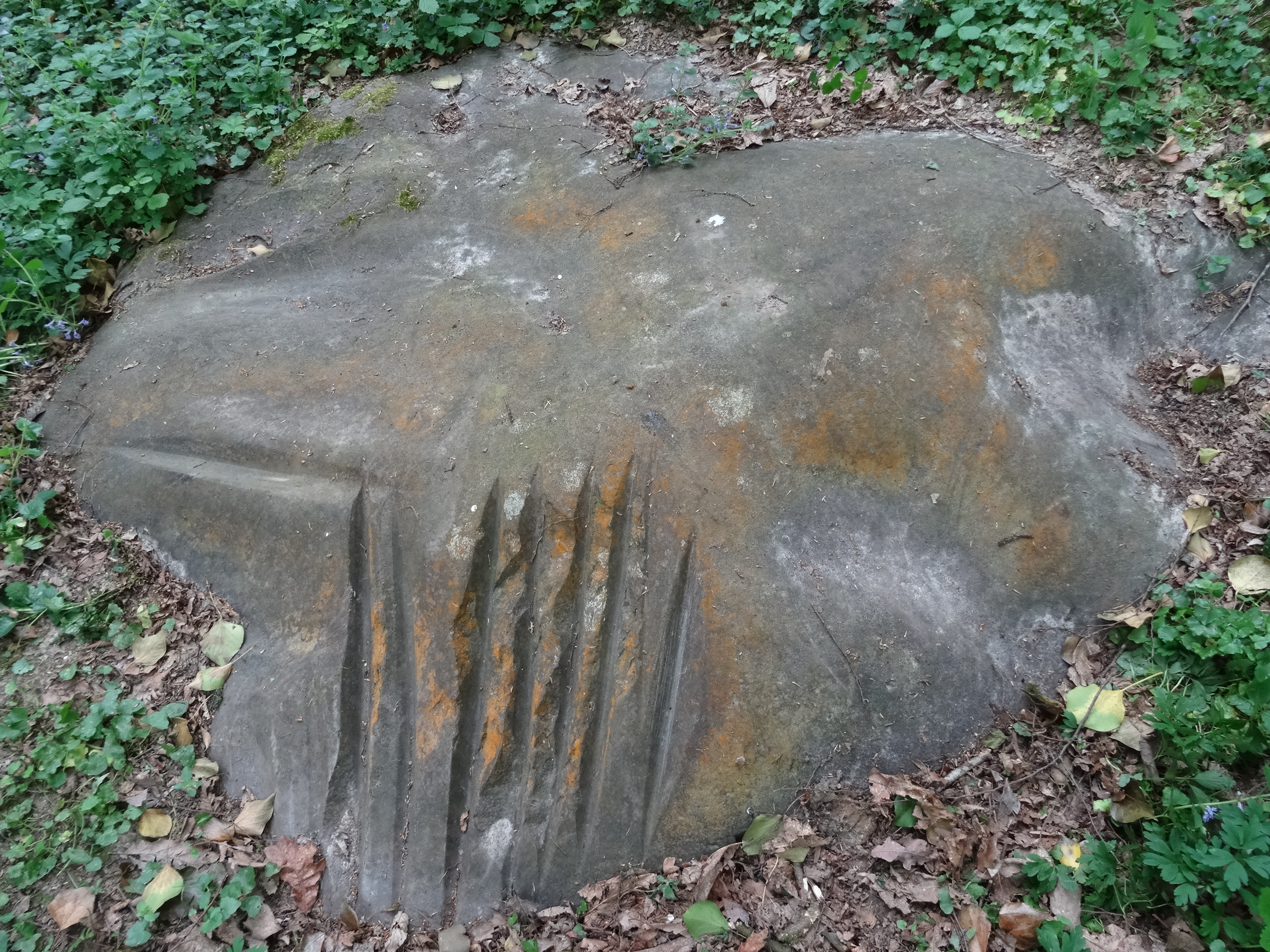
A polissoir in Charmille Wood, France

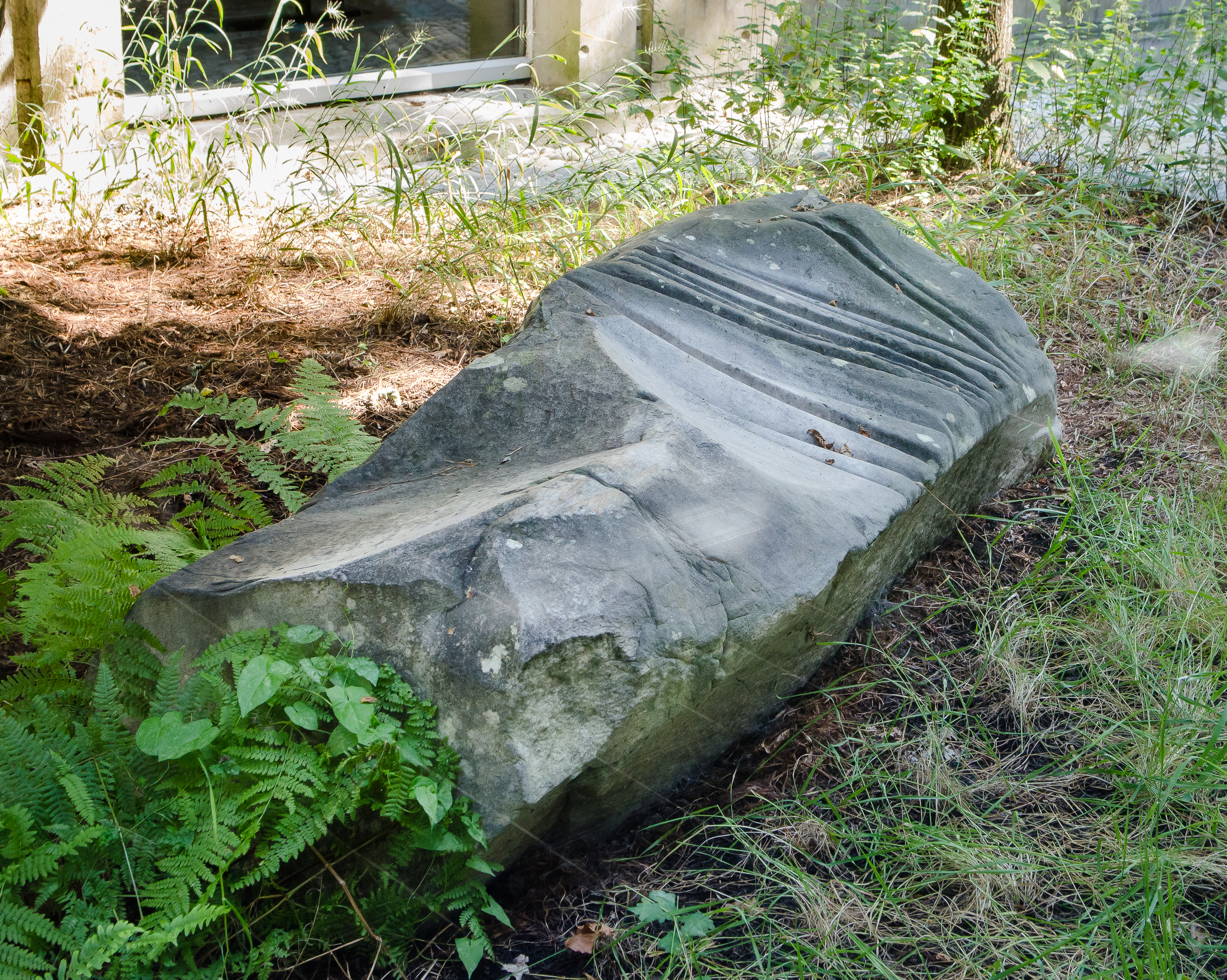
A polissoir in Ronehamn, Gotland, Sweden
