= Nybro IF =

Swedish association football club

- Full name: Nybro Idrottsförening
- Founded: 1906; 119 years ago.
- Ground: Victoriavallen; Nybro; Sweden
- Capacity: 1,500
- Chairman: Peter Lilja
- Head Coach: Joakim Hockman (appointed Nov 2020)
- League: Division 3 Östra Götaland
- 2019: Division 3 Sydöstra Götaland.
Home colours	Away colours

Nybro Idrottsförening (Nybro Athletic Association) is a Swedish association football club located in Nybro.

== Background ==
Nybro IF was founded in 1906 and has played in Sweden's second-highest division in football and men's top division in men's ice hockey. The ice hockey section broke away from the club in 1998 and formed their own club, Nybro Vikings IF.

Since their foundation Nybro IF has participated mainly in the upper and middle divisions of the Swedish football league system. The club currently plays in Division 3 Sydöstra Götaland which is the fifth tier of Swedish football. They play their home matches at the Victoriavallen in Nybro.

Players who have turned out in the colours of Nybro IF include Joel Allansson (now IFK Gothenburg), Christoffer Andersson (Helsingborgs IF), Peter Abelsson (Trelleborg FF), David Elm (Fulham FC) and Viktor Elm (Heerenveen).

Nybro IF are affiliated to the Smålands Fotbollförbund.

== Season to season ==
Season	Level	Division	Section	Position	Movements
1993	Tier 3	Division 2	Östra Götaland	2nd	Promotion Playoffs
1994	Tier 3	Division 2	Östra Götaland	11th	Relegated
1995	Tier 4	Division 3	Sydöstra Götaland	4th	
1996	Tier 4	Division 3	Sydöstra Götaland	1st	Promoted
1997	Tier 3	Division 2	Östra Götaland	2nd	Promotion Playoffs
1998	Tier 3	Division 2	Östra Götaland	3rd	
1999	Tier 3	Division 2	Östra Götaland	3rd	
2000	Tier 3	Division 2	Östra Götaland	9th	
2001	Tier 3	Division 2	Östra Götaland	10th	Relegation Playoffs
2002	Tier 3	Division 2	Östra Götaland	10th	Relegation Playoffs – Relegated
2003	Tier 4	Division 3	Sydöstra Götaland	2nd	Promotion Playoffs
2004	Tier 4	Division 3	Sydöstra Götaland	1st	Promoted
2005	Tier 3	Division 2	Mellersta Götaland	11th	Relegated
2006*	Tier 5	Division 3	Sydöstra Götaland	3rd	
2007	Tier 5	Division 3	Sydöstra Götaland	1st	Promoted
2008	Tier 4	Division 2	Östra Götaland	9th	
2009	Tier 4	Division 2	Södra Götaland	7th	
2010	Tier 4	Division 2	Östra Götaland	12th	Relegated

* League restructuring in 2006 resulted in a new division being created at Tier 3 and subsequent divisions dropping a level.
