= Slottsskogen/Godhem IF =

Swedish football club

- Full name: Slottsskogen/Godhem Idrottsförening
- Nickname: SG97
- Founded: 1997
- Ground: Ruddalen; Gothenburg; Sweden
- Chairman: Jan Larsson
- League: Division 5 Göteborg
- 2010: Division 4 Göteborg B, 12th (Relegated)
Home colours	Away colours

Slottsskogen/Godhem IF, abbreviated SG97, is a Swedish football club located in Gothenburg. The club was founded in 1997.

== Background ==
Since their foundation Slottsskogen/Godhem IF has participated mainly in the middle divisions of the Swedish football league system. The club currently plays in Division 4 Göteborg which is the sixth tier of Swedish football. They play their home matches at the Ruddalen in Göteborg.

Slottsskogen/Godhem IF are affiliated to the Göteborgs Fotbollförbund.

== Season to season ==
Season	Level	Division	Section	Position	Movements
1998	Tier 5	Division 4	Göteborg A	9th	
1999	Tier 5	Division 4	Göteborg A	10th	
2000	Tier 5	Division 4	Göteborg B	6th	
2001	Tier 5	Division 4	Göteborg B	3rd	
2002	Tier 5	Division 4	Göteborg B	2nd	Promotion Playoffs
2003	Tier 5	Division 4	Göteborg B	4th	
2004	Tier 5	Division 4	Göteborg B	1st	Promotion Playoffs – Promoted
2005	Tier 4	Division 3	Nordvästra Götaland	8th	
2006*	Tier 5	Division 3	Nordvästra Götaland	7th	
2007	Tier 5	Division 3	Nordvästra Götaland	7th	
2008	Tier 5	Division 3	Sydvästra Götaland	9th	
2009	Tier 5	Division 3	Sydvästra Götaland	10th	Relegated
2010	Tier 6	Division 4	Göteborg B	12th	Relegated
2011	Tier 7	Division 5			

* League restructuring in 2006 resulted in a new division being created at Tier 3 and subsequent divisions dropping a level.

== Attendances ==
In recent seasons Slottsskogen/Godhem IF have had the following average attendances:

Season	Average attendance	Division / Section	Level
2005	88	Div 3 Nordvästra Götaland	Tier 4
2006	61	Div 3 Nordvästra Götaland	Tier 5
2007	57	Div 3 Nordvästra Götaland	Tier 5
2008	51	Div 3 Sydvästra Götaland	Tier 5
2009	55	Div 3 Sydvästra Götaland	Tier 5
2010	44	Div 4 Göteborg B	Tier 6

* Attendances are provided in the Publikliga sections of the Svenska Fotbollförbundet website.
