= Furulunds IK =

Swedish football club

- Full name: Furulunds Idrottsklubb
- Founded: 1910
- Ground: Ljungvalla IP; Furulund; Sweden
- Chairman: Thomas Welander
- League: Division 4 Skåne Nordvästra
Home colours

Furulunds IK is a Swedish football club located in Furulund.

== Background ==
Furulunds IK currently plays in Division 3 Södra Götaland which is the fifth tier of Swedish football. They play their home matches at the Ljungvalla IP in Furulund.

The club is affiliated to Skånes Fotbollförbund. Furulunds IK played in the 2007 Svenska Cupen but lost 1–4 at home to Gantofta IF in the first round with an attendance of 154 spectators.

== Season to season ==
In their most successful period Furulunds IK competed in the following divisions:

Season	Level	Division	Section	Position	Movements
1969	Tier 4	Division 4	Skåne Mellersta	1st	Promoted
1970	Tier 3	Division 3	Skåne	4th	
1971	Tier 3	Division 3	Skåne	12th	Relegated
1972	Tier 4	Division 4	Skåne Mellersta	4th	

In recent seasons Furulunds IK have competed in the following divisions:

Season	Level	Division	Section	Position	Movements
2006*	Tier 7	Division 5	Skåne Mellersta	5th	
2007	Tier 7	Division 5	Skåne Västra	7th	
2008	Tier 7	Division 5	Skåne Västra	8th	
2009	Tier 7	Division 5	Skåne Mellersta	9th	Relegation Playoffs
2010	Tier 7	Division 5	Skåne Mellersta	3rd	Promotion Playoffs – Promoted
2011	Tier 6	Division 4	Skåne Nordvästra	1st	Promoted

* League restructuring in 2006 resulted in a new division being created at Tier 3 and subsequent divisions dropping a level.
