= 2007 Svenska Cupen =

Tournament details
- Country: Sweden
- Teams: 98

Final positions
- Champions: Kalmar FF
- Runners-up: IFK Göteborg

Tournament statistics
- Matches played: 97

The 2007 Svenska Cupen was the 52nd season of the main Swedish football Cup. The competition started on March 24, 2007, and concluded on September 27, 2007, with the final, held at Fredriksskans, Kalmar. Kalmar FF won the final with a 3–0 win against IFK Göteborg.

== First round ==
Team 1	Score	Team 2
24 March 2007
IFK Falköping FF	5–0	Tenhults IF
28 March 2007
Arameiska-Syrianska	1–2	IK Sirius
31 March 2007
IK Frej	2–0	Visby IF Gute FK
IFK Luleå	1–2	Ersboda SK
1 April 2007
Finlandia-Pallo IF	0–6	Norrby IF
Landvetter IS	0–4	Stenungsunds IF
4 April 2007
Stafsinge IF	0–4	IFK Malmö
Friska Viljor FC	2–4	IFK Timrå
5 April 2007
Skellefteå FF	2–3	Bodens BK
Hudiksvalls ABK	0–2	Östersunds FK
Avesta AIK	0–7	Syrianska IF Kerburan
6 April 2007
IFK Ölme	0–0 (aet); 4–3 (p)	BK Forward
Lyckeby GoIF	0–2	Rydaholms GoIF
Runtuna IK	3–0	Vallentuna BK
Växjö Norra IF	0–4	IFK Hässleholm
Furulunds IK	1–4	Gantofta IF
Melleruds IF	2–0	FC Trollhättan
7 April 2007
Limhamns IF	2–4 (aet)	Ängelholms FF
IF Heimer	2–3	Carlstad United BK
8 April 2007
Laholms FK	2–1	Bunkeflo IF
Vinbergs IF	0–2	Högaborgs BK
9 April 2007
FC Corner	1–2	Lärje-Angereds IF
Herrljunga SK FK	1–6	Utsiktens BK
Nässjö FF	0–3	IFK Värnamo
Perstorps SK	1–3	Ljungby IF
Ringarums IF	0–1	Oskarshamns AIK
Värtans IK	1–3	Enköpings SK
BK Hird	1–4	Eskilstuna City FK
Hässelby SK FF	0–5	Enskede IK
KB Karlskoga	1–6	Skövde AIK
Norberg BK	0–9	Gröndals IK
Dalkurd FF	1–5	Sandvikens IF
11 April 2007
Gamla Upsala SK	4–1	Vasalund/Essinge IF
14 April 2007
Mjölby Södra IF	0–4	Rynninge IK

== Second round ==
Team 1	Score	Team 2
19 April 2007
Lärje-Angereds IF	2–2 (aet); 4–5 (p)	Landskrona BoIS
IFK Malmö	0–3	Hammarby IF
Runtuna IK	0–3	IFK Norrköping
24 April 2007
Carlstad United BK	0–0 (aet); 7–6 (p)	Falkenbergs FF
25 April 2007
Enskede IK	0–2	Trelleborgs FF
Högaborgs BK	2–5	Kalmar FF
Laholms FK	0–2	Qviding FIF
Melleruds IF	1–3	IF Brommapojkarna
Rydaholms GoIF	0–1 (aet)	Assyriska FF
Ersboda SK	1–4	Degerfors IF
Rynninge IK	0–6	Åtvidabergs FF
Sandvikens IF	0–2	GIF Sundsvall
BK Forward	1–3	Väsby United
IFK Timrå	1–2	Örgryte IS
Oskarshamns AIK	0–1	Bodens BK
IK Sirius	2–3	Mjällby AIF
26 April 2007
IFK Värnamo	1–0	Jönköpings Södra IF
Gantofta IF	0–3	Umeå FC
Ängelholms FF	2–2 (aet); 1–4 (p)	IFK Göteborg
IFK Falköping	0–3	IF Elfsborg
Gamla Upsala SK	0–3	Halmstads BK
IFK Hässleholm	0–4	Helsingborgs IF
Norrby IF	0–2	Djurgårdens IF
Skövde AIK	2–1	GAIS
Syrianska IF Kerburan	0–3	Gefle IF
Utsiktens BK	1–0	Ljungskile SK
Östersunds FK	2–3	Örebro SK
1 May 2007
Enköpings SK	0–1	AIK
Stenungsunds IF	0–11	Malmö FF
Ljungby IF	3–2	IK Frej
2 May 2007
Gröndals IK	0–0 (aet); 3–4 (p)	BK Häcken
Eskilstuna City FK	0–2	Östers IF

== Third round ==
Team 1	Score	Team 2
15 May 2007
Degerfors IF	3–2 (aet)	Åtvidabergs FF
16 May 2007
Väsby United	3–2 (aet)	Umeå FC
Carlstad United BK	1–1 (aet); 3–4 (p)	Hammarby IF
IFK Värnamo	1–5	Kalmar FF
Bodens BK	1–2 (aet)	Örgryte IS
Skövde AIK	2–1	Assyriska FF
17 May 2007
Gefle IF	2–2 (aet); 5–3 (p)	Djurgårdens IF
Halmstads BK	1–3	IF Brommapojkarna
Qviding FIF	1–2 (aet)	BK Häcken
Ljungby IF	1–6	IFK Göteborg
Utsiktens BK	0–4	Helsingborgs IF
23 May 2007
Östers IF	3–1 (aet)	Örebro SK
24 May 2007
GIF Sundsvall	1–0	Trelleborgs FF
IFK Norrköping	1–0	AIK
Landskrona BoIS	2–1	Malmö FF
6 June 2007
Mjällby AIF	1–1 (aet); 3–2 (p)	IF Elfsborg

== Fourth round ==
Team 1	Score	Team 2
5 June 2007
IF Brommapojkarna	1–1 (aet); 4–5 (p)	Östers IF
13 June 2007
Väsby United	2–0	Degerfors IF
14 June 2007
Hammarby IF	1–2	IFK Norrköping
20 June 2007
BK Häcken	0–2	GIF Sundsvall
Skövde AIK	3–3 (aet); 3–4 (p)	Kalmar FF
Örgryte IS	1–1 (aet); 2–4 (p)	Mjällby AIF
28 June 2007
Helsingborgs IF	1–2	Landskrona BoIS
5 July 2007
IFK Göteborg	3–0	Gefle IF

== Quarter-finals ==
26 July 2007	Östers IF	0–1	Kalmar FF	Växjö
19:00			R. Santos 13'	Stadium: Värendsvallen; Attendance: 2,776; Referee: Martin Ingvarsson

26 July 2007	GIF Sundsvall	1–2 (a.e.t.)	Väsby United	Sundsvall
19:00	Lustig 6'		Jagne 47'; Catovic 110'	Stadium: Norrporten Arena; Attendance: 1,601; Referee: Markus Strömbergsson

26 July 2007	IFK Norrköping	2–3	Landskrona BoIS	Norrköping
20:15	Okkonen 14' (o.g.); Thordarson 90'		Cederquist 8', 56'; Dahlgren 56' (pen.)	Stadium: Idrottsparken; Attendance: 3,254; Referee: Johnny Lundbäck

2 August 2007	Mjällby AIF	1–2 (a.e.t.)	IFK Göteborg	Hällevik
18:30	Fejzullahu 10'		Mourad 90'; Jonsson 114'	Stadium: Strandvallen; Attendance: 5,482; Referee: Michael Lerjéus

== Semi-finals ==
8 September 2007	Väsby United	1–4	Kalmar FF	Upplands-Väsby
16:00	Jagne 12'		D. Elm 22'; Ingelsten 39'; Johansson 81', 90'	Stadium: Vilundavallen; Attendance: 726; Referee: Stefan Johannesson

22 September 2007	IFK Göteborg	4–0	Landskrona BoIS	Gothenburg
16:00	Wernbloom 38', 57', 74'; Bjärsmyr 62'			Stadium: Ullevi; Attendance: 2,222; Referee: Peter Fröjdfeldt

== Final ==
27 September 2007
19:00

Kalmar FF	3–0	IFK Göteborg
Santin 22', 88' (pen.); Ingelsten 65'

Fredriksskans, Kalmar
Attendance: 6,877
Referee: Martin Ingvarsson
