= Gantofta =

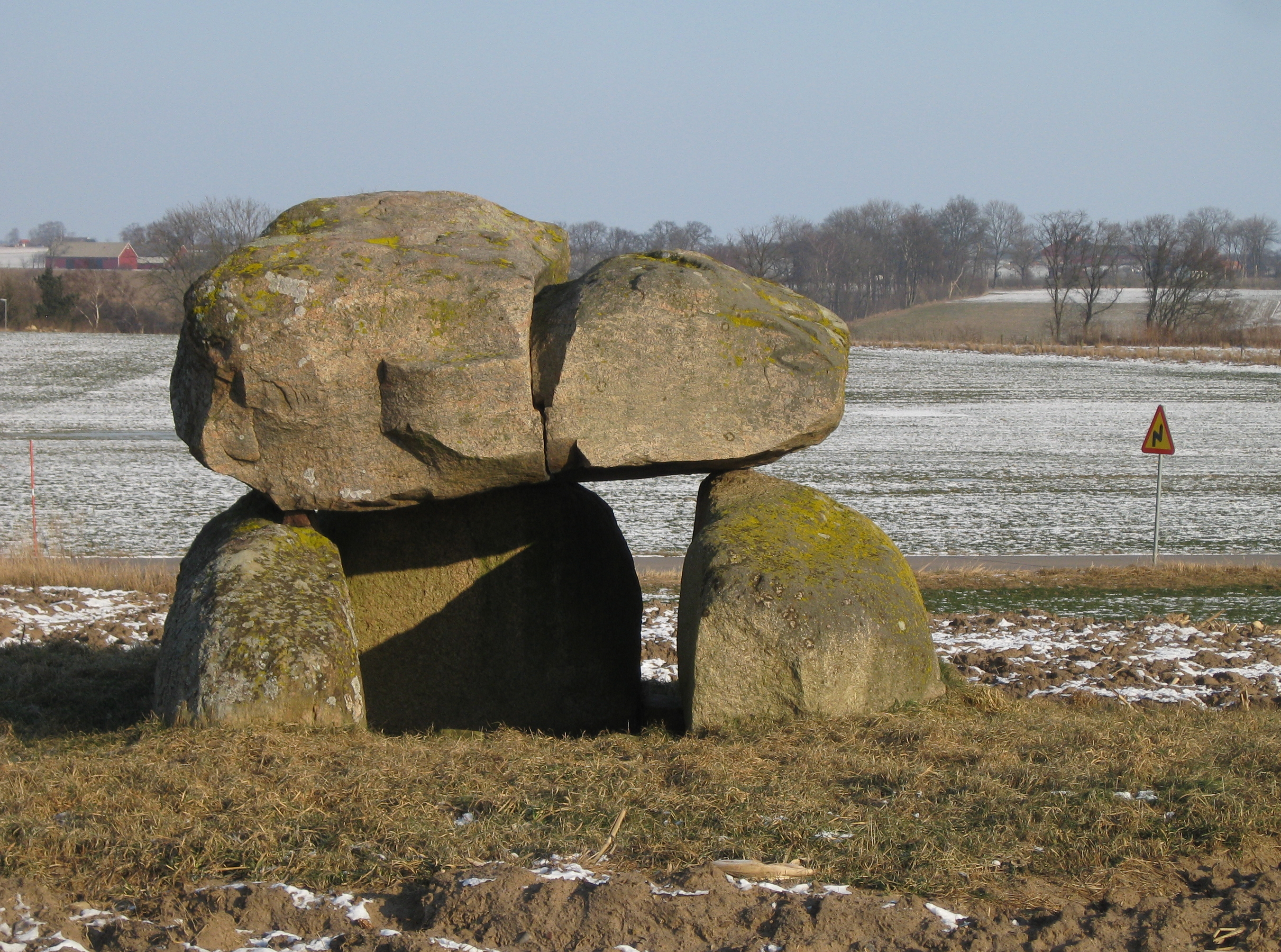
- Ancient dolmen in Gantofta

- Location within Skåne Location within Sweden
- Coordinates: 55°59′N 12°48′E
- Country: Sweden
- Province: Skåne
- County: Skåne County
- Municipality: Helsingborg Municipality

Area
  - Total: 0.91 km^{2} (0.35 sq mi)

Population (31 December 2010)
  - Total: 1,338
  - Density: 1,467/km^{2} (3,800/sq mi)
- Time zone: UTC+1 (CET)
  - Summer (DST): UTC+2 (CEST)

Gantofta (Swedish pronunciation: [ˈɡǎnːtɔfta]) is a locality situated in Helsingborg Municipality, Skåne County, Sweden with 1587 inhabitants in 2011.

== Sports ==
The following sports clubs are located in Gantofta:

- Gantofta IF
