= 2006 Division 2 (Swedish football) =

Swedish League Division 2
- Season: 2006
- Champions: IFK Timrå; Skiljebo SK; Gröndals IK; Skövde AIK; Torslanda IK; IFK Malmö
- Promoted: 6 teams above
- Relegated: 12 teams

The following are the statistics of the Swedish football Division 2 for the 2006 season.

== League standings ==
=== Division 2 Norrland ===
Pos	Team	Pld	W	D	L	GF	GA	GD	Pts	Promotion or relegation
1	IFK Timrå (P)	22	19	1	2	53	16	+37	58	Promotion to Division 1
2	IFK Luleå	22	15	2	5	55	26	+29	47	
3	Ersboda	22	13	2	7	44	27	+17	41	
4	Skellefteå FF	22	12	3	7	38	24	+14	39	
5	Hudiksvall	22	11	3	8	32	28	+4	36	
6	Umedalen	22	9	4	9	26	37	−11	31	
7	Friska Viljor	22	8	3	11	46	43	+3	27	
8	IFK Sundsvall	22	8	2	12	32	35	−3	26	
9	Infjärden	22	5	5	12	28	45	−17	20	
10	Kubikenborg	22	5	4	13	28	54	−26	19	Division 3 Relegation Playoffs
11	Sävast (R)	22	4	6	12	11	27	−16	18	Relegation to Division 3
12	Piteå IF (R)	22	3	5	14	21	52	−31	14	Relegation to Division 3

Rules for classification: 1) points; 2) goal difference; 3) number of goals scored.
(P) Promoted; (R) Relegated

=== Division 2 Norra Svealand ===
Pos	Team	Pld	W	D	L	GF	GA	GD	Pts	Promotion or relegation
1	Skiljebo SK (P)	22	17	2	3	56	22	+34	53	Promotion to Division 1
2	IK Brage	22	16	4	2	61	15	+46	52	
3	Sandvikens IF	22	15	2	5	56	26	+30	47	
4	Syrianska IF Kerburan	22	11	2	9	43	38	+5	35	
5	Västerås IK	22	10	3	9	34	33	+1	33	
6	Vallentuna	22	8	5	9	48	44	+4	29	
7	Värtan	22	8	4	10	36	35	+1	28	
8	Slätta	22	9	0	13	29	51	−22	27	
9	Brynäs	22	8	2	12	27	36	−9	26	
10	Älvsjö	22	5	7	10	22	46	−24	22	Division 3 Relegation Playoffs
11	IFK Österåker (R)	22	3	4	15	29	58	−29	13	Relegation to Division 3
12	Avesta (R)	22	2	5	15	26	63	−37	11	Relegation to Division 3

Rules for classification: 1) points; 2) goal difference; 3) number of goals scored.
(P) Promoted; (R) Relegated

=== Division 2 Östra Svealand ===
Pos	Team	Pld	W	D	L	GF	GA	GD	Pts	Promotion or relegation
1	Gröndal (P)	22	15	3	4	38	20	+18	48	Promotion to Division 1
2	Arameiska-Syrianska KIF	22	14	4	4	47	23	+24	46	
3	Enskede	22	13	5	4	45	25	+20	44	
4	Rynninge	22	11	8	3	47	27	+20	41	
5	Eskilstuna City	22	9	6	7	41	35	+6	33	
6	IFK Eskilstuna	22	8	3	11	26	34	−8	27	
7	Hammarby Talang	22	8	2	12	39	41	−2	26	
8	Nyköpings BIS	22	6	6	10	27	36	−9	24	
9	Haningealliansen	22	7	3	12	32	52	−20	24	
10	Spårvägen	22	5	8	9	20	25	−5	23	Division 3 Relegation Playoffs
11	Kungsör (R)	22	5	2	15	34	58	−24	17	Relegation to Division 3
12	IFK Ölme (R)	22	4	4	14	27	57	−30	16	Relegation to Division 3

Rules for classification: 1) points; 2) goal difference; 3) number of goals scored.
(P) Promoted; (R) Relegated

=== Division 2 Mellersta Götaland ===
Pos	Team	Pld	W	D	L	GF	GA	GD	Pts	Promotion or relegation
1	Skövde AIK (P)	22	15	6	1	57	26	+31	51	Promotion to Division 1
2	IK Sleipner	22	16	3	3	56	28	+28	51	
3	Tenhult	22	11	4	7	41	25	+16	37	
4	Motala AIF	22	9	7	6	45	44	+1	34	
5	Ljungby	22	7	8	7	27	28	−1	29	
6	Tord	22	6	10	6	34	34	0	28	
7	IF Heimer	22	6	9	7	42	45	−3	27	
8	Tibro	22	7	6	9	39	43	−4	27	
9	Linköping	22	8	3	11	38	44	−6	27	
10	Grimsås	22	7	5	10	35	34	+1	26	Division 3 Relegation Playoffs
11	Rydaholm (R)	22	5	3	14	34	62	−28	18	Relegation to Division 3
12	Ulricehamn (R)	22	2	2	18	25	70	−45	8	Relegation to Division 3

Rules for classification: 1) points; 2) goal difference; 3) number of goals scored.
(P) Promoted; (R) Relegated

=== Division 2 Västra Götaland ===
Pos	Team	Pld	W	D	L	GF	GA	GD	Pts	Promotion or relegation
1	Torslanda IK (P)	20	12	4	4	33	25	+8	40	Promotion to Division 1
2	Lärje-Angered	20	12	3	5	48	24	+24	39	
3	IK Oddevold	20	10	5	5	32	17	+15	35	
4	Kinna	20	9	8	3	30	18	+12	35	
5	Jonsered	20	8	5	7	33	31	+2	29	
6	Gunnilse	20	8	4	8	30	33	−3	28	
7	Skene	20	7	5	8	28	27	+1	26	
8	Varbergs BoIS	20	7	3	10	20	21	−1	24	
9	Sandared	20	5	6	9	17	35	−18	21	
10	Floda	20	4	4	12	17	29	−12	16	Division 3 Relegation Playoffs
11	Finlandia-Pallo (R)	20	3	3	14	15	43	−28	12	Relegation to Division 3

Rules for classification: 1) points; 2) goal difference; 3) number of goals scored.
(P) Promoted; (R) Relegated

=== Division 2 Södra Götaland ===
Pos	Team	Pld	W	D	L	GF	GA	GD	Pts	Promotion or relegation
1	IFK Malmö (P)	22	13	8	1	46	22	+24	47	Promotion to Division 1
2	Malmö Anadolu	22	13	2	7	40	26	+14	41	
3	Lunds BK	22	11	6	5	46	31	+15	39	
4	Helsingborgs Södra BIS	22	11	6	5	41	27	+14	39	
5	Karlskrona	22	11	2	9	41	31	+10	35	
6	Sölvesborg	22	7	7	8	46	52	−6	28	
7	Kirseberg	22	8	2	12	33	43	−10	26	
8	Höllvikens GIF	22	6	7	9	28	36	−8	25	
9	Laholm	22	6	6	10	30	34	−4	24	
10	Gantofta	22	6	5	11	31	50	−19	23	Division 3 Relegation Playoffs
11	Amundtorp (R)	22	3	11	8	32	39	−7	20	Relegation to Division 3
12	Påarp (R)	22	3	6	13	28	51	−23	15	Relegation to Division 3

Rules for classification: 1) points; 2) goal difference; 3) number of goals scored.
(P) Promoted; (R) Relegated
