= List of shipwrecks in October 1855 =

The list of shipwrecks in October 1855 includes ships sunk, wrecked, grounded, or otherwise lost during October 1855.

== 1 October ==
List of shipwrecks: 1 October 1855
Ship	State	Description
Diana	Stettin	The brig sprang a leak and foundered. Her crew were rescued. She was on a voyage from Grangemouth, Stirlingshire, United Kingdom to Stettin.
Frères	France	The chasse-marée was abandoned in the North Sea (54°00′N 0°40′E). Her six crew were rescued by Julia (United Kingdom). Frères was on a voyage from Boulogne, Pas-de-Calais to Newcastle upon Tyne, Northumberland, United Kingdom.
Isabella	United Kingdom	The schooner was wrecked at "Slate Harbour", Nova Scotia, British North America.
Ivor	United Kingdom	The schooner was severely damaged at Cardiff, Glamorgan by an onboard explosion in her cargo of coal.

== 2 October ==
List of shipwrecks: 2 October 1855
Ship	State	Description
Adelheid	Kingdom of Hanover	The koff ran aground and was wrecked on Düne, Heligoland. Her crew were rescued. She was on a voyage from Varel to an English port.
Mansfield	United Kingdom	The schooner sprang a leak at South Shields, County Durham and was beached.

== 3 October ==
List of shipwrecks: 3 October 1855
Ship	State	Description
Change	United Kingdom	The barque ran aground on the Goodwin Sands, Kent. She was on a voyage from Sunderland, County Durham to Barcelona, Spain. She was refloated and taken in to Margate, Kent in a leaky condition.
Conservative	United Kingdom	The ship was wrecked on the Devil's Grip Reef, off the north tip of Prince Edward Island, British North America with some loss of life.
Frères Unis	France	The ship was discovered derelict in the North Sea off Cowden, Yorkshire, United Kingdom. She broke up the next day.
John Bright	United Kingdom	The ship was driven ashore at Harboøre, Denmark. Her crew were rescued. She was on a voyage from London to Memel, Prussia.
Rambler	United Kingdom	The schooner was in collision with Signet (United Kingdom) and was abandoned off The Lizard, Cornwall. Her crew were rescued by Signet, but were later taken back to the vessel by a pilot cutter and put in to Falmouth, Cornwall. Rambler was on a voyage from London to Liverpool, Lancashire.

== 4 October ==
List of shipwrecks: 4 October 1855
Ship	State	Description
Belle	United Kingdom	The ship was driven ashore near Littlehampton, Sussex. She was on a voyage from Liverpool, Lancashire to Liverpool. She was refloated on 8 October and taken in to Littlehampton.
Boadicea	United Kingdom	The ship ran aground at Barber's Point, in the Dardanelles.
Hopewell	United Kingdom	The barque ran aground in the Dardanelles. She was refloated the next day. She was on a voyage from London to the Crimea.
Ivanhoe	United States	The schooner was run into and sank in the Lake Erie. All on board survived. She was on a voyage from Cleveland, Ohio to Saginaw, Michigan.
Marie Antoinette	France	The ship was destroyed by fire in the Dardanelles.
Nautilus	United Kingdom	The ship was abandoned in the Dogger Bank. Her crew were rescued by the steamship Zingari (United Kingdom). Nautilus was on a voyage from Grangemouth, Stirlingshire to Hamburg.
William Bateman	Danzig	The ship was driven ashore and wrecked on Sanday, Orkney Islands. Her crew were rescued. She was on a voyage from Danzig to Portrush, County Antrim, United Kingdom.

== 5 October ==
List of shipwrecks: 5 October 1855
Ship	State	Description
Cæsar	Stettin	The ship was wrecked on Langeoog, Kingdom of Hanover. She was on a voyage from Málaga, Spain to Hamburg.
Improvista	Spain	The ship ran aground on the Noorderhaaks Bank, in the North Sea off the Dutch coast. She was on a voyage from Seville to Hamburg. She had become a wreck by 15 October.

== 6 October ==
List of shipwrecks: 6 October 1855
Ship	State	Description
James McBride	United States	The brigantine was rammed and sunk by C. R. Williams near Milwaukee. Raised, repaired and returned to service.
John Franklin	United Kingdom	The ship ran aground and sank off Düne, Heligoland. Her crew were rescued. She was on a voyage from Newcastle upon Tyne, Northumberland to Hamburg.
Robert Bruce	United Kingdom	The ship ran aground off Bermuda. She was on a voyage from Liverpool, Lancashire to Wilmington, Delaware, United States. She was refloated and taken in to St. George, Bermuda in a leaky condition.
Walter Scott	United States	The ship caught fire at Malta. She was still burning on 9 October.

== 7 October ==
List of shipwrecks: 7 October 1855
Ship	State	Description
Bee	United Kingdom	The ferry was in collision with the ferry Vernon (United Kingdom) in the River Mersey with the loss of two lives, one from each ship. Survivors from Bee were rescued by Britannia (United Kingdom). Bee was beached.
Dromo	United Kingdom	The ship ran aground on the Goodwin Sands, Kent. She was on a voyage from Antigua to London. She was refloated but found to be leaky.
Gleaner	United Kingdom	The brig was driven ashore and damaged at Ooster Point, in the Westgat. Her crew were rescued. She was on a voyage from Newcastle upon Tyne, Northumberland to Schiedam, South Holland, Netherlands. Gleaner was refloated then next day with assistance from the steamship Brouwershaven (Netherlands).
Jessie Eason	United Kingdom	The brig ran aground on the Lemon and Ore Sand, in the North Sea. She was on a voyage from South Shields, County Durham to Dordrecht, South Holland, Netherlands. She was refloated and found to be leaky.
Pegasus	Denmark	The ship ran aground on the Brager. She was on a voyage from Aarhus to Leith, Lothian, United Kingdom. She was refloated and resumed her voyage.
Susan	United Kingdom	The ship ran aground on the Goodwin Sands. She was on a voyage from London to Dénia, Spain. She was refloated but found to be leaky.
Sylphide	Hamburg	The ship ran aground and was damaged. She was on a voyage from Hamburg to Rio de Janeiro, Brazil. She put in to Ramsgate, Kent.
Zelie	France	The schooner ran aground on the Newcombe Sand, in the North Sea off the coast of Suffolk, United Kingdom. She was on a voyage from Newcastle upon Tyne, Northumberland, United Kingdom to Honfleur, Calvados.

== 8 October ==
List of shipwrecks: 8 October 1855
Ship	State	Description
Carolina Maria	Stralsund	The ship departed from Sunderland, County Durham, United Kingdom for Stralsund. No further trace, presumed foundered with the loss of all hands.
William's Adventure	United Kingdom	The schooner departed from Sunderland, County Durham for Porto, Portugal. No further trace, presumed foundered with the loss of all hands.

-

== 9 October ==
List of shipwrecks: 9 October 1855
Ship	State	Description
Alfred	United Kingdom	The schooner was driven ashore and wrecked at Staithes, Yorkshire.
Samuel Badger	United States	The full-rigged ship was abandoned in the Atlantic Ocean. Her crew were rescued by Dorothea (United Kingdom). Samuel Badger was on a voyage from Trapani, Sicily to Portsmouth, New Hampshire.
Triumph	United Kingdom	The tug ran aground south of Sunderland, County Durham and was wrecked.

== 10 October ==
List of shipwrecks: 10 October 1855
Ship	State	Description
Good Intent	United Kingdom	The schooner was driven ashore and damaged near Brancaster, Norfolk. She was on a voyage from South Shields, County Durham to Lowestoft, Suffolk. She was refloated on 23 October and taken in to Brancaster.
Jem	United Kingdom	The brigantine sprang a leak and was beached at the Mumbles, Glamorgan. She was on a voyage from Cardiff, Glamorgan to Waterford.
John and Elizabeth	United Kingdom	The ship was driven ashore and wrecked at Weybourne, Norfolk. She was on a voyage from South Shields, County Durham to London.
Maria	Hamburg	The ship was driven ashore in the Elbe. She was on a voyage from Hamburg to Ipswich, Suffolk.
Marie Clothilde	France	The ship was driven ashore and severely damaged near Calais. She was on a voyage from Stocholm to Saint-Malo, Ille-et-Vilaine. .
Minerva	United Kingdom	The ship was driven ashore and wrecked in the Vlie. Her crew were rescued. She was on a voyage from Grimsby, Lincolnshire to Hamburg.

== 11 October ==
List of shipwrecks: 11 October 1855
Ship	State	Description
Brilliant	United Kingdom	The schooner broke free from her mooring, collided with seven other vessels, then ran aground, capsized and sank in the River Ribble.
Catherine	United Kingdom	The schooner ran aground in the River Mersey. She was on a voyage from Drogheda, County Louth to Liverpool, Lancashire.
Confucius	United Kingdom	The snow collided with the brig James (United Kingdom) and sank in the North Sea off the coast of Norfolk. She was on a voyage from Grangemouth, Stirlingshire to Woolwich, Kent.
Four Sisters	United Kingdom	The ship was driven ashore near Helsingør, Denmark.
Hope	United Kingdom	The schooner foundered in the Bristol Channel off Nelson's Point, Glamorgan. Her crew were rescued.
Lark	United Kingdom	The ship was run down and sunk by a barque in the English Channel off the coast of Dorset.
Twende Brodre	Denmark	The ship ran aground on the Shipwash Sand, in the North Sea off the coast of Suffolk, United Kingdom. She was on a voyage from Aalborg to London, United Kingdom. She was refloated and taken in to Harwich, Essex, United Kingdom in a sinking condition.
Springhill	United Kingdom	The barque was driven ashore and wrecked west of Tangier, Morocco. Her crew were rescued by HMS Prometheus (Royal Navy). Springhill was on a voyage from Malta to Liverpool.

== 12 October ==
List of shipwrecks: 12 October 1855
Ship	State	Description
Andromache	United Kingdom	The ship foundered in the Atlantic Ocean (26°27′N 26°30′W). Her crew took to the boat and subsequently reached the Cape Verde Islands. She was on a voyage from "Melbourne, Africa" to Liverpool, Lancashire.
Confucius	United Kingdom	The ship was in collision with James and foundered in the North Sea off the coast of Norfolk. Her crew were rescued by James. Confucius was on a voyage from Grangemouth, Stirlingshire to Woolwich, Kent.
Etheldred	United Kingdom	The ship capsized at "New Liverpool", Province of Canada, British North America. She was later towed to Quebec City.
Hope	United Kingdom	The schooner sank off Nelson's Point, Glamorgan. Her crew were rescued.
Hound	United Kingdom	The ship was wrecked at Cape Town, Cape Colony.
Machaon	United Kingdom	The ship was abandoned off Santa Maria Island, Azores. Her crew took to a boat and reached the island. She was on a voyage from Callao, Peru to Valencia.
Messenger	United Kingdom	The ship departed from Moulmein, Burma for a British port. No further trace, presumed foundered with the loss of all hands.
Two Sisters	United Kingdom	The ship was wrecked at "Suauco". Her crew survived.

== 13 October ==
List of shipwrecks: 13 October 1855
Ship	State	Description
Curwen	Sweden	The schooner was driven ashore and wrecked on the east coast of "Glason". She was on a voyage from Umeå to Lübeck.
Frederick Moreton	United Kingdom	The ship was abandoned in the Atlantic Ocean. Her crew were rescued by Strand (United Kingdom). Frederick Moreton was on a voyage from Calcutta, India to Liverpool, Lancashire.
Machaon	United Kingdom	The ship was abandoned and sank in the Atlantic Ocean. Her crew were rescued. She was on a voyage from Callao, Peru to Valentia Island, County Kerry.
Sylph	United Kingdom	The ship foundered in the North Sea 130 nautical miles (240 km) west of Lindesnes, Norway. Her crew were rescued. She was on a voyage from Liverpool to Stettin.
Vine	United Kingdom	The brig was driven ashore on Düne, Heligoland. Her crew were rescued. She was on a voyage from Hamburg to an English port.
Zeublon	United Kingdom	The ship was driven ashore at Dungeness, Kent. She was on a voyage from London to Scutari, Ottoman Empire. She was later refloated.

== 14 October ==
List of shipwrecks: 14 October 1855
Ship	State	Description
Maria	United Kingdom	The ship was wrecked on Terschelling, Friesland, Netherlands. She was on a voyage from Aarhus, Denmark to London.

== 15 October ==
List of shipwrecks: 15 October 1855
Ship	State	Description
Frederika Sophia	Sweden	The ship was driven ashore at Klädesholmen. She was on a voyage from Wick, Caithness, United Kingdom to Marstrand. She had become a wreck by 26 October.
Good Intent	United Kingdom	The ship struck a sunken wreck and was damaged. She put in to Tobermory, Isle of Mull in a leaky condition.
Useful	United Kingdom	The brig ran aground on the Holme Sand, in the North Sea off the coast of Suffolk. She was on a voyage from South Shields, County Durham to London. She was refloated and taken in to Lowestoft, Suffolk.

== 16 October ==
List of shipwrecks: 16 October 1855
Ship	State	Description
Active	United States	Bound from Manitowoc, Wisconsin, for Chicago, Illinois, with a cargo of wood shingles, the 49-foot (15 m), 62-gross register ton schooner capsized during the evening in Lake Michigan off Port Washington, Wisconsin, during a gale. Her three-man crew survived by clinging to her rigging while she drifted away from the coast, and the men were rescued about 10 nautical miles (19 km; 12 mi) off shore on the morning of 17 October by the schooner Thorton (United States). Active was last seen on the afternoon of 18 October when the schooner Stronach (United States) sighted her upturned bottom floating 15 nautical miles (28 km; 17 mi) east of Oak Creek, Wisconsin, at 42°53.031′N 087°47.932′W.
Catalina Fomento	Spain	The ship was driven ashore east of Calais, France. Her crew were rescued. She was on a voyage from Christiansand, Norway to Santander.
Fredrika Sophia	Sweden	The ship was wrecked on Klädesholmen. Her crew were rescued.
Gem	United Kingdom	The schooner ran aground off Læsø, Denmark. She was on a voyage from Wick, Caithness to Stettin. She was refloated and taken in to Fredrikshavn, Denmark in a leaky Condition.
Oscar	Sweden	The schooner was wrecked on the Sogaard Voorstrand, off the coast of Denmark. Her crew were rescued. She was on a voyage from Hull, Yorkshire to Königsberg, Prussia.
Senator	United Kingdom	The ship was driven ashore at the entrance to the Dardanelles. She was refloated.
Solide	Sweden	The schooner was wrecked near "Forckow". She was on a voyage from Norrköping to Hull, Yorkshire, United Kingdom.

== 17 October ==
List of shipwrecks: 17 October 1855
Ship	State	Description
America	United States	The full-rigged ship was driven ashore and damaged at Cabrita Point, Spain. She was on a voyage from Trapani, Sicily to an American port. She was later refloated.

== 18 October ==
List of shipwrecks: 18 October 1855
Ship	State	Description
Commodore	United Kingdom	The ship was sighted 20 nautical miles (37 km) off Moulmein, British Burma whilst on a voyage from Moulmein to a British port. No further trace, presumed foundered with the loss of all hands.
Dash	United Kingdom	The schooner ran aground on the West Hoyle Bank, in Liverpool Bay. Her crew were rescued by a lifeboat. She was on a voyage from Liverpool, Lancashire to Cork. Dash broke up on 23 October.
Emma Zoller	United Kingdom	The ship caught fire and was abandoned off the mouth of the Humber. She was on a voyage from Shediac, New Brunswick, British North America to Grimsby, Lincolnshire.
Leven	United Kingdom	The ship was driven ashore in the River Wyre at Knott-End-on-Sea, Lancashire. She was on a voyage from Troon, Ayrshire to Fleetwood, Lancashire.
Simpson	United Kingdom	The ship was driven ashore in the River Taff. She was on a voyage from Cardiff, Glamorgan to Waterford.
Thomas Clifton	United Kingdom	The ship was run down and sunk in the Irish Sea off Point Lynas, Anglesey by the steamship Royal William (United Kingdom). Her crew were rescued by Royal William. Thomas Clifton was on a voyage from Preston, Lancashire to Drogheda, County Louth.

== 19 October ==
List of shipwrecks: 19 October 1855
Ship	State	Description
Emma Zoller	Norway	The ship caught fire and was abandoned in the North Sea off the mouth of the Humber. She was on a voyage from Shediac, New Brunswick, British North America to Grimsby, Lincolnshire, United Kingdom.
Herald	United Kingdom	The ship ran aground on a reef off Cape Bear, Nova Scotia, British North America. She was on a voyage from Bathurst, Nova Scotia to Liverpool, Lancashire. She was refloated on 23 October and taken in to Georgetown, Prince Edward Island, British North America.
Naas	United Kingdom	The ship departed from Calcutta, India for London. No further trace, presumed foundered with the loss of all hands.

== 20 October ==
List of shipwrecks: 20 October 1855
Ship	State	Description
Alleghany	United States	Carrying a large cargo of goods destined for Milwaukee, Wisconsin, the 177-foot (54 m), 468.2-gross register ton screw steamer was wrecked within 100 feet (30 m) of shore at Milwaukee during the night of 20–21 October after her steam engine became disabled and she dragged her anchors during a gale. Her boiler and engine were salvaged during the winter of 1856. Her hull broke up and probably lies buried in mud at 42°59.160′N 087°51.768′W.
Maria Ann	United Kingdom	The fishing smack was driven against the breakwater at Ramsgate, Kent and sank with the loss of one of her five crew. Survivors were rescued by the lifeboat Northumberland (United Kingdom) and the gunboat Sainte Barbe (French Navy).
Northumberland	United Kingdom	The lifeboat struck the wreck of Maria Ann (United Kingdom and was holed. She was beached at Ramsgate. Subsequently repaired and returned to service.
Sainte Barbe	French Navy	The Poudre-class gunboat ran aground on the wreck of Maria Ann (United Kingdom). She was refloated.

== 21 October ==
List of shipwrecks: 21 October 1855
Ship	State	Description
Emanuel Kettelsen	Norway	The ship ran aground and sank off Amager, Denmark. Her crew were rescued. She was on a voyage from Wick, Caithness, United Kingdom to Danzig.
Hesperus	United Kingdom	The ship was destroyed by fire at Trinidad de Cuba, Captaincy General of Cuba.
Jessamine	United Kingdom	The sbrig was abandoned in the Atlantic Ocean (39°36′N 13°40′W) and foundered. Her crew were rescued by Helios (Norway). Jessamine was on a voyage from Syra, Greece to Queenstown, County Cork.
John	United Kingdom	The ship ran aground in the River Ouse and was severely damaged. She was on a voyage from Goole, Yorkshire to London.
HMS Urgent	Royal Navy	The troopship ran aground at Fort Ricasoli, Malta. She was on a voyage from Plymouth, Devon to Malta. All 1,100 people on board were taken off.

== 22 October ==
List of shipwrecks: 22 October 1855
Ship	State	Description
Majestic	United Kingdom	The schooner struck a sunken rock in the Raughty River and was damaged. She put in to Sligo in a leaky condition.
Mary	United Kingdom	The schooner struck a rock off the Smalls Lighthouse and was damaged. She was on a voyage from Newport, Monmouthshire to Waterford. She put in to Milford Haven, Pembrokeshire in a leaky condition.
Prudence	United Kingdom	The ship was driven ashore on Eireland, North Holland, Netherlands. Her crew were rescued. She was on a voyage from London to Amsterdam, North Holland. Prudence was refloated on 24 October.

== 23 October ==
List of shipwrecks: 23 October 1855
Ship	State	Description
Australia	United Kingdom	The ship departed from the Chincha Islands, Peru for a British port. No further trace, presumed foundered with the loss of all 45 crew.
Cracket	(United Kingdom of Great Britain and Ireland) Saint Lucia	The cutter was driven ashore and wrecked in Maquis Bay.

== 24 October ==
List of shipwrecks: 24 October 1855
Ship	State	Description
Emile	France	The ship ran aground on Scroby Sands, Norfolk, United Kingdom. She was on a voyage from Sunderland, County Durham, United Kingdom to Caen, Calvados. She was refloated and put in to Great Yarmouth, Norfolk in a leaky condition.
Isle of Thanet	Kingdom of Sardinia	The paddle steamer sank in the North Sea 13 nautical miles (24 km) off Great Yarmouth with the loss of three of her thirteen crew. Survivors were rescued by a smack and the tug Robert Owen (United Kingdom). Isle of Thanet was on a voyage from Hull, Yorkshire, United Kingdom to Genoa.
Medora	United Kingdom	The ship was driven ashore and wrecked at Cape Dog, Newfoundland, British North America. Her crew survived. she was on a voyage from Prince Edward Island, British North America to Londonderry.
Syrus	United Kingdom	The barque was driven ashore and wrecked at "Eitzenlock". She was on a voyage from Hartlepool, County Durham to Cuxhaven.
Testiren	France	The schooner was driven ashore and wrecked at Margam, Glamorgan, United Kingdom. Her crew were rescued. She was on a voyage from Bordeaux, Gironde to Swansea, Glamorgan.

== 25 October ==
List of shipwrecks: 25 October 1855
Ship	State	Description
Ann Catherine	United Kingdom	The brig was driven onto the Green Grounds, in the Bristol Channel off the mouth of the River Tawe and consequently foundered. Her crew were rescued by the tug Beaufort (United Kingdom) . She was on a voyage from Swansea, Glamorgan to London.
Bonne Marie	France	The schooner was driven ashore and wrecked at Havre de Grâce, Seine-Inférieure. Her six crew were rescued. She was on a voyage from Bayonne, Basses-Pyrénées to Rouen, Seine-Inférieure.
Denmark	United States	The full-rigged ship was driven ashore at Selsey Bill, Sussex, United Kingdom and was abandoned. She later floated off and was taken in to Portsmouth, Hampshire, United Kingdom.
Don Juan	United Kingdom	The yacht was driven ashore at Southampton, Hampshire.
Highflyer	United States	The medium clipper departed from San Francisco, California for Hong Kong. Presumed subsequently captured off Formosa and burnt with the loss of all hands.
Royal Sovereign	United Kingdom	The ship ran aground at Egremont, Lancashire. She was on a voyage from Liverpool, Lancashire to Savannah, Georgia, United States. She was refloated the next day.

== 26 October ==
List of shipwrecks: 26 October 1855
Ship	State	Description
Countess of Zetland	United Kingdom	The ship was wrecked on the Rocas-riff, off the coast of Brazil.
Daphne	United Kingdom	The ship ran aground on Hamilton's Bank, in the Solent. She was on a voyage from Ipswich, Suffolk to Haiti. She was refloated and taken in to Portsmouth, Hampshire in a leaky condition.
Dependent	United Kingdom	The ship was driven ashore at Chichester, Sussex. She was on a voyage from Nassau, Bahamas to London.
Elizabeth	United Kingdom	The schooner was driven ashore on Inishmaan, County Galway. Her crew were rescued.
Enchantress	United Kingdom	The barque was driven ashore and wrecked between Dungeness, Kent and Rye, Sussex with the loss of twelve of her thirteen crew. She was on a voyage from London to Buenos Aires, Argentina.
Eugene and Pauline	France	The schooner ran agrouhnd on the Green Grounds. She was refloated and taken in to Swansea in a sinking condition.
Hermione	United Kingdom	The ship was wrecked on the Roar Sand. Her crew were rescued. She was on a voyage from Hartlepool to Sunderland, County Durham.
Isabella	United Kingdom	The brig was wrecked on the Roar Sand with the loss of four of her crew. She was on a voyage from Sunderland to Bordeaux, Gironde, France.
Katherine	United Kingdom	The steamship foundered off the Owers Sandbank, in the English Channel. Her crew were rescued. Also reported as a schooner named Catherine.
Maria and Ann	United Kingdom	The fishing smack was wrecked off Ramsgate, Kent with the loss of two of her five crew.
Thetis	United Kingdom	The ship was driven ashore at Memel, Prussia. She was on a voyage from Malmö, Sweden to Memel.

== 27 October ==
List of shipwrecks: 27 October 1855
Ship	State	Description
Abigail	United Kingdom	The ship was wrecked on the East Mouse, off the coast of Anglesey. She was on a voyage from Liverpool, Lancashire to Dunkirk, Nord.
Bessie Bent	United Kingdom	The schooner collided with City of Benares (United Kingdom) and sank in The Downs. She was on a voyage from London to Plymouth, Devon. She was subsequently taken in to Ramsgate, Kent in a waterlogged condition.
Elizabeth	United Kingdom	The ship struck a sunken rock off Lochmaddy, North Uist, Outer Hebrides and was holed. She was on a voyage from Sunderland, County Durham to Limerick. She put in to Stornoway, Isle of Lewis, Outer Hebrides in a severely leaky condition and was beached there.
Hampton	United Kingdom	The ship was abandoned in the Atlantic Ocean. Her crew were rescued by Windermere (United Kingdom) before she foundered. Hampton was on a voyage from South Shields, County Durham to New York, United States.
Neptune	United Kingdom	The ship was driven ashore and wrecked north of Drogheda, County Louth. Her crew were rescued.
Theodoca	Brazil	The barque was driven ashore in Batten Bay, Devon. She was on a voyage from Havre de Grâce, Seine-Inférieure, France to Lisbon, Portugal and Lima, Peru.

== 28 October ==
List of shipwrecks: 28 October 1855
Ship	State	Description
Exchange	United States	The steamship caught fire and sank in the Red River. All on board were rescued.
Gezina Gezina	Netherlands	The ship was driven ashore and wrecked on Ameland, Friesland. Her crew were rescued. She was on a voyage from Dunkirk, Nord, France to Hartlepool, County Durham, United Kingdom.
Magnet	United Kingdom	The brig was abandoned in the North Sea off the coast of Norfolk. Her crew were rescued. She was subsequently towed in to Great Yarmouth, Norfolk in a derelict condition.
Marie Emilie	France	The ship was driven ashore and broke her back at Ramsgate, Kent, United Kingdom. She was on a voyage from Sunderland, County Durham to Nantes, Loire-Inférieure.
Perth	United Kingdom	The smack ran aground at Ilfracombe, Devon and was damaged. She was on a voyage from Cardiff, Glamorgan to Plymouth, Devon.

== 29 October ==
List of shipwrecks: 29 October 1855
Ship	State	Description
Arabian	(United Kingdom of Great Britain and Ireland) British North America	The steamship struck the quayside and sank at Port Darlington, Province of Canada. She was on a voyage from Kingston, Jamaica to Toronto, Province of Canada.
Emily and Anne	United Kingdom	The ship was driven ashore and wrecked at North Somercotes, Lincolnshire. She was on a voyage from London to Hull, Yorkshire.
Gossamer	United Kingdom	The ship ran aground on the Pollock Ripe. She was on a voyage from Boston, Massachusetts to New York City, United States. She was refloated on 31 October and towed to New York.
Jane and Susan	United Kingdom	The ship foundered in the Bristol Channel 4 nautical miles (7.4 km) east south east of Lundy Island, Devon. Her crew were rescued by Harmony (United Kingdom). Jane and Susan was on a voyage from Swansea, Glamorgan to Plymouth, Devon.
Maria Sophia	United Kingdom	The ship was driven ashore at Cardiff, Glamorgan. She was on a voyage from Cardiff to London. She was refloated.

== 30 October ==
List of shipwrecks: 30 October 1855
Ship	State	Description
Albert	Norway	The brig was wrecked on the Goodwin Sands, Kent, United Kingdom. Her crew survived. She was on a voyage from Rochefort, Charente-Inférieure to Kragerø, Norway. She was refloated but consequently sank.
Amelia	United Kingdom	The ship was driven ashore near Hartlepool, County Durham. Her crew survived. She was refloated and taken in to Hartlepool.
Brenda	United Kingdom	The ship was driven ashore and severely damaged at Sunderland, County Durham. Her crew were rescued by breeches buoy. She was on a voyage from Hamburg to Sunderland. Brenda was consequently condemnded.
Canada	United Kingdom	The brig was driven ashore at Hartlepool. Her crew survived. She was on a voyage from London to Hartlepool. She was refloated on 10 November and taken in to Hartlepool.
Capital	United Kingdom	The brig was driven ashore at Blyth, Northumberland. Her crew were rescued. She was on a voyage from Hamburg to Blyth. She was refloated on 11 November and taken in to Blyth.
Content	United Kingdom	The brig was driven ashore north of Whitby, Yorkshire. Her crew were rescued.
Diamond	United Kingdom	The schooner foundered in the Atlantic Ocean 5 nautical miles (9.3 km) south west of the Isles of Scilly. Her four crew took to a boat; three survivors were rescued on 3 November by the barque Voorwarts (Netherlands). Diamond was on a voyage from Swansea, Glamorgan to Southampton, Hampshire.
Elizabeth	United Kingdom	The schooner was driven ashore and wrecked at Kingstown, County Dublin. Her crew survived.
Fanny Gann	United Kingdom	The schooner was wrecked on the Foreness Rock, Margate, Kent. She was on a voyage from Dunkirk, Nord, France to Whitstable, Kent. She was refloated on 12 November and taken in to Margate.
Finland	United Kingdom	The brig was driven ashore north of Whitby. Her crew were rescued.
Friendship	United Kingdom	The brig was driven ashore north of Whitby. Her crew were rescued. She was refloated on 7 November and taken in to Whitby.
George Clark	United Kingdom	The brig was driven ashore at Lindisfarne, Northumberland. Her crew were rescued. She was on a voyage from Hamburg to South Shields, County Durham.
Gertrudis	United Kingdom	The ship ran aground on The Platters, off Holyhead, Anglesey and was damaged. She was on a voyage from Liverpool, Lancashire to Havana, Cuba. She was refloated and towed in to Holyhead.
Great Britain	United Kingdom	The schooner ran aground on the Discovery Rock, in the Gaspar Strait. She was refloated.
Gustavia	Kingdom of Hanover	The galiot was driven ashore at West Hartlepool, County Durham. Her crew survived. She was on a voyage from Schiedam, South Holland, Netherlands to Hartlepool.
Hannah	United Kingdom	The Humber Keel capsized off Whitby with the loss of all hands.
Hannah	United Kingdom	The ship was driven ashore near Woolferton, Norfolk. Her crew were rescued. She was refloated on 4 November and taken in to King's Lynn, Norfolk.
Hendrika Jantina	United Kingdom	The ship was abandoned in the North Sea off Cromer, Norfolk. She was on a voyage from Sunderland to Rochester, Kent.
Henriette	Stralsund	The ship was driven ashore and wrecked 3 nautical miles (5.6 km) east of Leba, Prussia. Her crew were rescued. She was on a voyage from Jasmund, Grand Duchy of Mecklenburg-Schwerin to Danzig.
Jantje Meier	Netherlands	The schooner was wrecked on the Kentish Knock. Her crew were rescued by the lugger Eclipse (United Kingdom). Jantje Meier was on a voyage from Newcastle upon Tyne, Northumberland to Genoa, Kingdom of Sardinia.
John and Ann	United Kingdom	The schooner was driven ashore and wrecked at Tynemouth, Northumberland. Her crew were rescued by the South Shields Lifeboat. She was on a voyage from South Shields to Cromarty.
Kate	United Kingdom	The ship was driven ashore on "Camack-Gladden Beach", Cornwall. Her crew were rescued by rocket apparatus. She was refloated on 6 November and towed in to St. Ives, Cornwall.
Lady Lindsay	United Kingdom	The steamship foundered in the Irish Sea with the loss of all fourteen people on board. She was on a voyage from Lytham St. Annes, Lancashire to Belfast, County Antrim.
London	United Kingdom	The schooner was driven ashore and wrecked at Seaton Carew, County Durham. She was on a voyage from Hamburg to Hartlepool.
Marco Polo	United Kingdom	The schooner ran aground on the Herd Sand, in the North Sea off the coast of County Durham. Her crew were rescued. She was on a voyage from Barking, Essex to Newcastle upon Tyne and Leith, Lothian.
Maria Whitfield	United Kingdom	The brig ran aground on the Falsterbo Reef, in the Baltic Sea. She was on a voyage from Söderhamn, Sweden to Southampton, Hampshire.
Marys	United Kingdom	The brig struck the pier and sank at Hartlepool. Her crew survived. She was on a voyage from Hamburg to Hartlepool.
Miner	United Kingdom	The ship was driven ashore at Scarborough, Yorkshire. Her crew were rescued by the Scarborough Lifeboat. She was on a voyage from Hamburg to Newcastle upon Tyne. Miner was refloated on 7 November and taken in to Scarborough.
Moore	United Kingdom	The brig was driven ashore at West Hartlepool. She was on a voyage from Amsterdam, North Holland to Hartlepool.
Neptune	United Kingdom	The brig was driven ashore south of West Hartlepool. Her crew survived. She was refloated on 12 November and towed in to Hartlepool.
Planet	Prussia	The brig was wrecked on the Newcombe Sand, in the North Sea off the coast of Suffolk, United Kingdom. Her crew were rescued. She was on a voyage from Middlesbrough, Yorkshire to Algiers, Algeria.
Radical	United Kingdom	The brig was driven ashore at Seaton, County Durham. She was on a voyage from Hamburg to Sunderland. She was refloated on 8 November and taken in to East Hartlepool, County Durham.
Rebecca	United Kingdom	The brig was driven ashore and wrecked at Redcar, Yorkshire. Her crew were rescued. She was refloated on 9 November and taken in to Redcar.
Sarah Jane	United Kingdom	The ship was driven ashore near Penarth Head, Glamorgan. She was on a voyage from Waterford to Cardiff, Glamorgan. She was refloated the next day and beached at Cardiff.
Speculation	Norway	The brig was abandoned at sea. Her crew were rescued by Hlya (Flag unknown).
Tees	United Kingdom	The ship was driven ashore at Middleton, County Durham. She was on a voyage from Hamburg to Hartlepool.
Thetis	United Kingdom	The brig was driven ashore and wrecked south of Hendon, County Durham. Her crew were rescued. She was on a voyage from the Nieuw Diep to Sunderland.
Tweed	United Kingdom	The brig was driven ashore at Seaton. Her crew were rescued by the Seaton Lifeboat.
Wallborg	Sweden	The schooner was driven ashore and wrecked at Redcar with the loss of all hands.

== 31 October ==
List of shipwrecks: 31 October 1855
Ship	State	Description
Annie and Elizabeth	United Kingdom	The sloop was driven ashore at Cardigan. She was on a voyage from Cardiff, Glamorgan to Pwllheli, Caernarfonshire.
Arrow	United Kingdom	The ship was driven ashore and wrecked at Padstow, Cornwall.
Dovre	Norway	The ship was wrecked on "Noses Island", in the Farne Islands, Northumberland, United Kingdom. She was on a voyage from Drammen to Leith, Lothian, United Kingdom.
Earl of Erne	United Kingdom	The paddle steamer ran aground between Dundalk and Soldier's Point, County Louth. She was on a voyage from Dundalk to Liverpool, Lancashire. She was refloated and resumed her voyage.
Freya	Norway	The ship was driven ashore at Marshchapel, Lincolnshire, United Kingdom.
Guardiana	Sweden	The ship was driven ashore at Redcar, Yorkshire. Her crew were rescued. She was on a voyage from Hamburg to Redcar. She was refloated on 9 November and taken in to Redcar.
Hebe	United Kingdom	The brig was driven ashore and wrecked near Filey, East Riding of Yorkshire. Her crew were rescued by the Filey Lifeboat. She was on a voyage from Sunderland, County Durham to Wisbech, Cambridgeshire. Hebe was refloated on 9 November and towed in to Scarborough, Yorkshire.
Hercules	United Kingdom	The brig was wrecked on the Herd Sand, in the North Sea off the coast of County Durham. Her crew were rescued by the South Shields Lifeboat.
HMS Hind	Royal Navy	The Dapper-class gunboat was driven ashore at Cley-next-the-Sea, Norfolk. Her crew were rescued. She was refloated on 11 November.
Hogoneas	Norway	The brig foundered in the North Sea off the coast of Yorkshire with the loss of all hands. She was on a voyage from Norway to Newcastle upon Tyne, Northumberland, United Kingdom.
Isabella Stewart	United Kingdom	The ship was run into by Mary (United Kingdom) and was abandoned in the Irish Sea. Her crew were rescued by Mary. Isabella Stewart was on a voyage from Liverpool, Lancashire to Donegal.
Kleine Hans	Rostock	The ship foundered in the North Sea 10 nautical miles (19 km) south south west of Lindesnes, Norway. Her crew were rescued by Alert (United Kingdom). Kleine Hans was on a voyage from Leith to Rostock.
Magnet	United Kingdom	The schooner was driven ashore at Cardigan. She was on a voyage from Neath, Glamorgan to Liverpool.
Minerva	Norway	The barque foundered in the Dogger Bank. Her ten crew were rescued by Darlington (United Kingdom). Minerva was on a voyage from Drøbak to London, United Kingdom.
Minor	United Kingdom	The brig was driven ashore and wrecked at Bridlington, Yorkshire. Her crew were rescued by the Bridlington Lifeboat. She was on a voyage from Hamburg to the River Tyne.
Neptune	United Kingdom	The schooner was wrecked on the North Bull, in the Irish Sea off the coast of County Dublin. Her crew were rescued.
Sabrina	United Kingdom	The steamship was driven ashore at the mouth of the River Avon. She was on a voyage from Cork to Bristol, Gloucestershire. She was refloated the next day and resumed her voyage.
Thalestris	United Kingdom	The ship departed from Calcutta, India for London. No further trace, presumed foundered with the loss of all hands.

== Unknown date ==
List of shipwrecks: Unknown date in October 1855
Ship	State	Description
Albion	United Kingdom	The barque was abandoned in the Atlantic Ocean before 8 October. Her crew were rescued by Loo Choo (United Kingdom).
America	United States	The ship was driven ashore at Cabrita Point, Spain. Despite attempts to refloat her by the tug Buster ( (United Kingdom of Great Britain and Ireland) Gibraltar, HMS Prometheus and HMS Rhadamanthus (both Royal Navy), she subsequently became a wreck. America was on a voyage from Trapani, Sicily to an American port. She was refloated on 14 November and taken in to Gibraltar.
Carrier Pigeon	United States	The ship was abandoned in the Atlantic Ocean between 19 and 21 October. Her crew were rescued on 22 October by Harmonie (Sweden). Carrier Pigeon was on a voyage from Queenstown, County Cork, United Kingdom to Matanzas, Cuba. She was towed in to Queenstown on 22 October.
Catherina Wilhelmina	Denmark	The tjalk foundered in the Dogger Bank. Her crew were rescued by South Esk (United Kingdom). Catherina Wilhelmina was on a voyage from Hartlepool, County Durham, United Kingdom to Thisted.
Gnyge	France	The steamship was run into and sunk at the entrance to the Bosphorus by an Austrian steamship. Her crew were rescued.
Helena	Kingdom of Hanover	The ship departed from Hartlepool for Varel between 3 and 7 October. No further trace, presumed foundered with the loss of all hands.
Herald	United Kingdom	The ship was wrecked on Prince Edward Island, British North America. She was on a voyage from Bathurst, New Brunswick, British North America to Liverpool, Lancashire.
Huma	United Kingdom	The ship was lost at East London, Cape Colony.
Janet	United Kingdom	The ship was lost on a voyage from Cuba, Cuba to London.
Kalufat	United States	The brig foundered in the Atlantic Ocean. Her crew were rescued by Van der Palm (Netherlands). Kalufat was on a voyage from Cardiff, Glamorgan, United Kingdom to Florida.
Le Cygne	United Kingdom	The steamship was in collision with an Austrian steamship and sank in the Bosphorus. All on board survived.
Lord Raglan	United Kingdom	The barque was abandoned in the Atlantic Ocean off False Cape, Virginia, United States before 20 October. She came ashore and was wrecked at False Cape on or after 6 November.
Oscar	United Kingdom	The ship was wrecked on the coast of Jutland before 17 August. She was on a voyage from Hull to Königsberg, Prussia.
Panaya Micina	Greece	The ship was driven ashore at Waterford, United Kingdom. She was refloated on 18 October.
Prince	United Kingdom	The brig was destroyed by fire. All on board were rescued by Albatross (United Kingdom. Prince was on a voyage from London to Algoa Bay.
Princess Mary	United Kingdom	The ship ran aground in the Eure. She was on a voyage from Rouen, Seine-Inférieure to Ardrossan, Ayrshire. She was refloated on 28 October and towed in to Havre de Grâce, Seine-Inférieure.
Thor	United Kingdom	The schooner was driven ashore and wrecked at Lossiemouth Moray. Her five crew were rescued. She was on a voyage from Lossiemouth to Leith, Lothian.
Tonbridge	United Kingdom	The brig was wrecked on the Gunfleet Sand, in the North Sea off the coast of Essex.
Ulysses	United Kingdom	The schooner was driven out to sea from Wells-next-the-Sea, Norfolk. She came ashore at Woolferton, Norfolk. She was refloated on 9 November and taken in to Wells-next-the-Sea.
