= Höviksnäs =

- Location within Västra Götaland Location within Sweden
- Coordinates: 58°02′N 11°46′E
- Country: Sweden
- Province: Bohuslän
- County: Västra Götaland County
- Municipality: Tjörn Municipality

Area
  - Total: 1.30 km^{2} (0.50 sq mi)

Population (31 December 2010)
  - Total: 1,309
  - Density: 1,008/km^{2} (2,610/sq mi)
- Time zone: UTC+1 (CET)
  - Summer (DST): UTC+2 (CEST)

Höviksnäs is a locality situated in Tjörn Municipality, Västra Götaland County, Sweden with 1,309 inhabitants in 2010.
