= Birgitta Stenberg =

Swedish author, translator and illustrator (1932–2014)

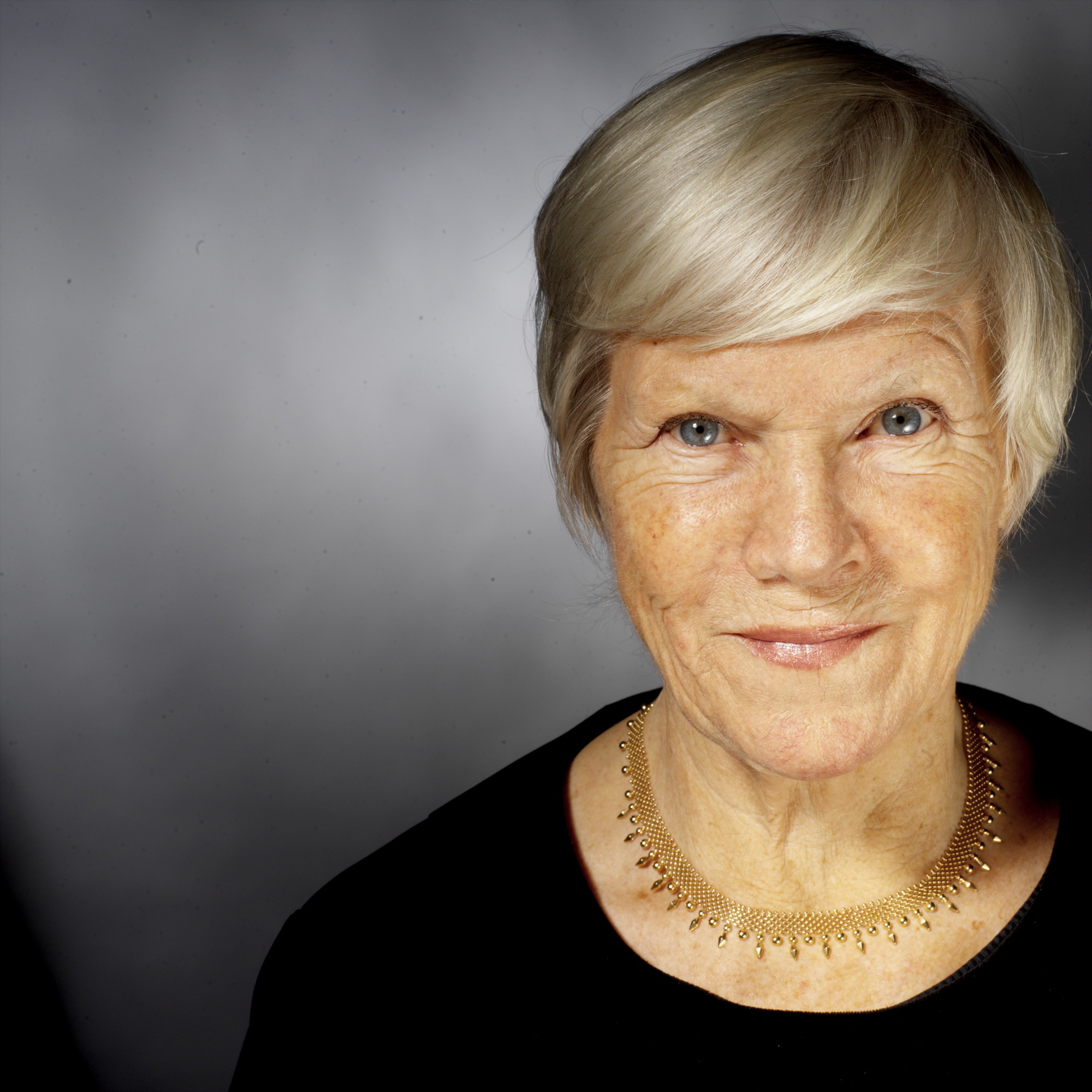
- Stenberg in 2008
- Born: 26 April 1932; Engelbrekt Parish, Sweden
- Died: 23 August 2014 (aged 82); Smedsbolet, Västra Götaland County, Sweden
- Occupations: Author, translator, illustrator, politician
- Spouses: Håkan Lagergren (m. 1974; div. 1991) Kerstin Bjärkstedt (m. 2012)

Birgitta Alma Sofia Stenberg (26 April 1932 – 23 August 2014) was a Swedish author, translator and illustrator. She was the 2005 winner of the Selma Lagerlöf Prize.

== Life ==
Birgitta Stenberg was born in Engelbrekt Parish in 1932. She was educated in Visby and finally in Paris. Stenberg spent a lot of time in southern Europe improving her language skills. In the early 1950s, she lived in Paris, Rome and on the French Riviera, experiences that inspired her book, Kärlek i Europa (Love in Europe), which detailed her various sexual adventures. The book was later translated into English as Manplay in Europe.

For a time, she was the mistress of the Mafioso Charles "Lucky" Luciano, who had been deported from the United States back to his native Italy. Stenberg had been offered a job in New York by a travel agent who additionally added in a promise of a layover in Buenos Aires where she was to work temporarily as a model before going on to New York. The Mafioso Luciano, who knew much about the Italian underworld told her that the travel agent was a white slaver and if she went to Buenos Aires, she would be forced to work in a brothel instead of the promised modeling job. Through Luciano Stenberg met his friend, the exiled King Farouk of Egypt, who was living in Italy and whose mistress she ultimately became. Luciano had grown up in New York, having left Sicily at the age of 9, and found Naples, where he lived, to be a rather "foreign" place, causing him to regard himself as being in exile from America. The common feeling of exile had caused Luciano to bond with Farouk. At her first date with Farouk in an expensive Roman restaurant, she was impressed by Farouk's "sweet eyes" together with the aura of power as the king wore an expensive suit while being surrounded by his bodyguards who silently tended to his every need.

Farouk told her that he liked her because her blond hair and large breasts together with her age reminded him of his second wife, the teenage Queen Narriman, who likewise had blond hair and large breasts. After following Farouk into exile in July 1952, Narriman had returned to Egypt in March 1953. Whenever she went out with the king, his burly Albanian bodyguards were always on hand to seize the cameras from any paparazzi, a task that they performed with much efficiency as they roughed up several paparazzi who tried to take photographs of the king with his latest mistress. Farouk told her that this was cheaper than having to bribe newspaper editors from publishing any of the photographs the paparazzi might take of him. Stenberg wrote about sex with Farouk: "I'm doing this with the king of twenty million people. This nice fat man was one of the world's symbols of power". She described the king as very sexually aggressive, but in common with his other mistresses complained he had an abnormally small penis.

Stenberg lived in a Rome apartment with a gay American couple, which enraged the homophobic Farouk as he called her roommates "perverts" once he learned that the two men were more than just friends. In the face of his rage, Stenberg did not dare tell Farouk that she was bisexual, fearing that would upset him even more. At Farouk's insistence, she moved into the Villa Dusmet that he rented outside of Rome to get her away from her "pervert" gay American friends. She found the Villa Dusmet dark, gloomy and claustrophobic with the king's Albanian bodyguards imposing tight restrictions on where she could go while outside she always heard the barking of the guard dogs that were set loose on the grounds of the Villa. She also found the king's jokes painfully unfunny such as: "Have you heard what one palm tree said to the other? Let's make a date". Eventually, she tired of Farouk and despite his gift of an expensive diamond bracelet ended the affair. Stenberg told Farouk "I'll miss you and life with you", leading the king to sadly say "Do you think it's something to miss". Stenberg reflected that she could not answer that question.

She became a Swedish author, translator and illustrator. Stenberg was, during the early 1950s, a part of the literary assembly Metamorfosgruppen. She wrote the script for the film Raskenstam.

During the Cold War in the 1950s, Stenberg was named secretary of the Swedish department of the Congress for Cultural Freedom and editor for Kulturkontakt which was founded by the CIA under the cover name of Ford Foundation.

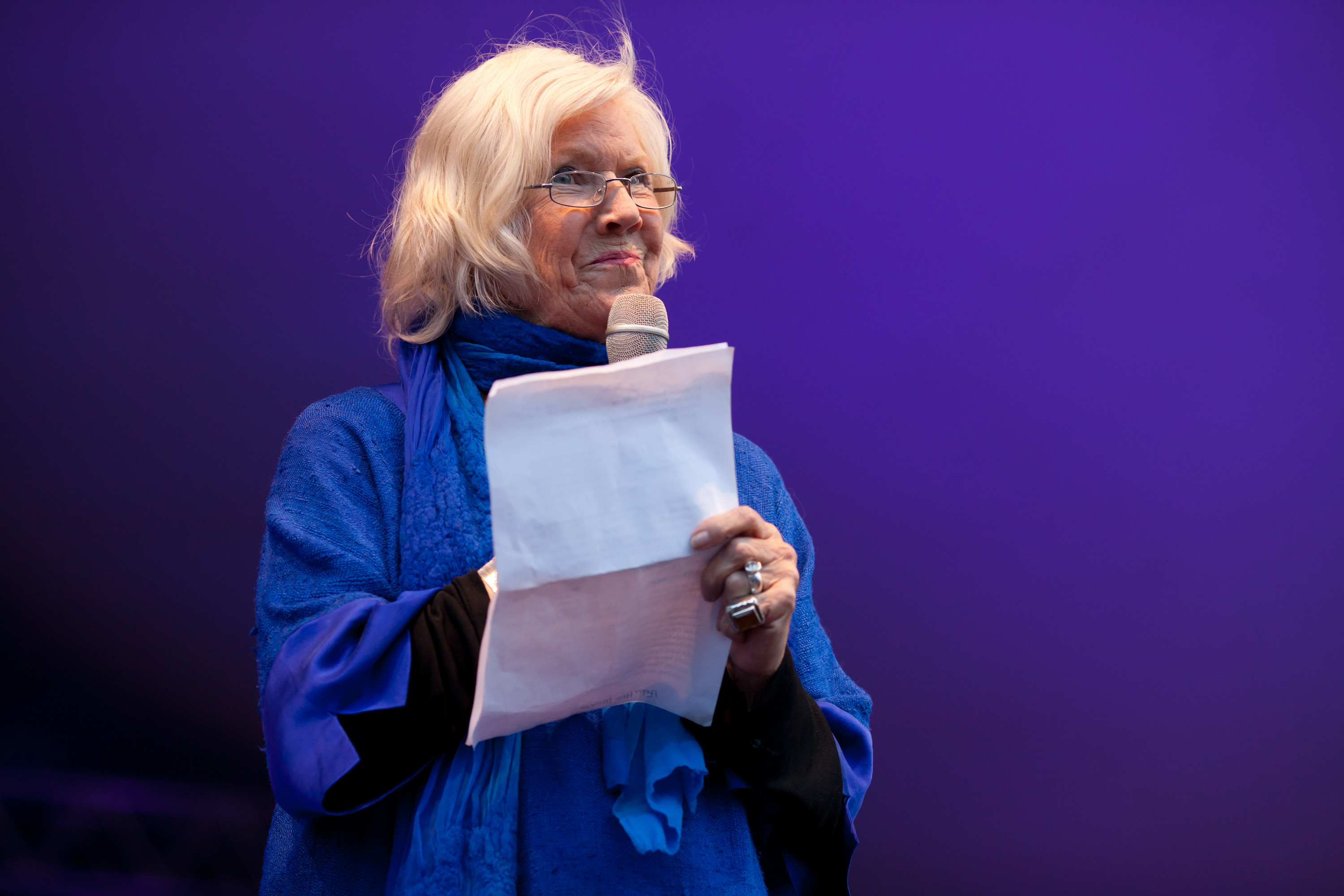
Stenberg speaking at Stockholm Pride in 2013

Stenberg's first novel Fritt förfall was refused by Bonnier Group in 1952 due to the novel's "lack of literary quality". According to the author herself, the publishing house was put off by the novels controversial lesbian motive. The novel was published in 2008 by Normal publishers. Stenberg later wrote an autobiographical suite that deals with sex, drugs and art making, starting with Kärlek i Europa in 1981 and continuing with Apelsinmannen (1983), Spanska trappan (1987) and Alla vilda (2004). In 2009, she argued for the legalization of cannabis during the live studio news show Rapport.

Stenberg's first published novel was Mikael och Poeten in 1956. The novel dealt with the Kejne Affair, a topic that is further explored in the later work Apelsinmannen.

She worked at the radio interception at the Ministry for Foreign Affairs, as a journalist at the magazine Arbetaren (The Worker), as an interpreter, fisherman and local politician for the Left Party.

== Personal life ==
Stenberg lived in Åstol, Sweden and she was openly bisexual. In 1974, she married Håkan Lagergren (1934–1991). In 2012, Stenberg remarried Kerstin Bjärkstedt (born 1953). Stenberg died at her home in Smedsbolet, Gullspång Municipality, Västra Götaland County from hepatic cancer on 23 August 2014.

== Awards ==
- 1999 Aniara Prize
- 1999 Piraten Prize
- 2005 Selma Lagerlöf Prize
- 2005 The bookcircles grand readers award for "Erotic Novels"

== Selected works ==
- 1956 – Mikael och Poeten (fiction)
- 1958 – Vit av natten (fiction)
- 1961 – Chans (fiction)
- 1963 – Våldgästen (fiction)
- 1964 – De frånvända (fiction)
- 1969 – Rapport (fiction)
- 1973 – Skurkar (short stories)
- 1976 – Klara Färdiga (children's book)
- 1977 – Farväl till havet (easy-read)
- 1977 – Klara Färdiga och prins Hektor (children's book)
- 1981 – Kärlek i Europa (autobiographical novel)
- 1983 – Raskenstam (roman) (filmscripts the same years)
- 1983 – Apelsinmannen (autobiographical novel)
- 1984 – Glatta livet (shortstories)
- 1985 – Det skuddade stoftet (poems)
- 1986 – Bodil (easy-read)
- 1986 – Emily och Eddy (children's book)
- 1987 – Spanska Trappan (autobiographical novel)
- 1987 – Falkboet (children's book)
- 1988 – Kaninmysteriet (children's book)
- 1990 – Tusenbröderna (fiction, part 1 of trilogy)
- 1991 – Mannen i havet (poems)
- 1991 – Detta med Doris (fiction, part 2 of trilogy)
- 1994 – Arabesk (fiction, part 3 of trilogy)
- 1996 – Pagodernas drottning (poem)
- 1997 – Mina öar (essays)
- 1998 – Äntligen av med liket (fiction)
- 2001 – De 7 dödssynderna (cook book)
- 2004 – Alla Vilda (autobiographical novel)
- 2005 – Allt möjligt om bin
- 2005 – Åtrå och strid (play, essays)
- 2006 – Fritt förfall (first publication of refused debut novel from 1952)
- 2008 – Erotiska noveller (shortstories)
- 2010 – Eldar och is (autobiographical novel)
- 2013 – Syster Linda (fiction)
- 2014 – Skriver mig ut ur världen (autobiographical novel)

Children's books about Billy, in collaboration with Mati Lepp

- Whistle, 1989
- Billy on the country, 1991
- Billy on new adventures, 1994
- Billy and the monster, 1994
- Billy's Strange Day, 1995
- Billy and the new girl, 1996
- Billy in school, 1998
- Billy and Grandma, 1999
- Billy and pigs, 2001
- Billy and Lotta Runaways, 2001
- Billy gets a visit, 2003
- Billy and the Frog, 2004
- Billy gets angry, 2006
- Billy and the mysterious cat, 2007
- Billy and ball, 2009
