= MV Lady Odiel =

Swedish built British cargo ship

History

Sweden
- Name: MV Kalmarsund IX
- Namesake: Kalmarsund is the Swedish name of Kalmar Strait and is in the name of company Angbats A/B Kalmarsund.
- Owner: Angbats A/B Kalmarsund., Kalmar
- Builder: Kalmar Shipyard, Kalmar
- Yard number: 386
- Launched: 1957
- Identification: IMO number 5180362

History

Sweden
- Name: MV Jomfruland
- Owner: Andersson, AE, Rönnäng
- Acquired: 1964

History

United Kingdom
- Name: MV Lady Odiel
- Owner: Odiel Shipping Company, Gibraltar
- Acquired: 1981
- Fate: Capsized on 20 October 1984

General characteristics
- Tonnage: 487 GRT
- Length: 58.2 m (190.94 ft)
- Beam: 9.4 m (30.84 ft)
- Draught: 4 m (13.12 ft)
- Propulsion: One diesel engine 690 hp (510 kW), single shaft, one screw
- Speed: 11 knots (20 km/h)

MV Lady Odiel, often written as MV Lady Odile, originally named MV Kalmarsund IX and later also renamed into MV Jomfruland, was a Swedish-built 487 GRT cargo ship in 1957 for Swedish company Angbats A/B Kalmarsund. She was acquired in 1964 by Swedish Andersson, AE, Rönnäng and in 1981 by the British Odiel Shipping Company.

On 20 October 1984, she sank northwest of Terschelling. The captain survived, but four of the five people on board drowned. The captain was rescued by the Polish ship Nicolai Rej. A search operation only started in the afternoon on the day after the disaster due to poor reporting of the disaster by the captain of the Nicolai Rej. All bodies were found up to a year after the disaster. Identification was concluded 2.5 years after the disaster in April 1987.

== Description ==
MV Kalmarsund IX was built by Kalmar Shipyard, Kalmar. She was yard number 386 and was launched in 1957. She was 58.2 m (190.94 ft) long, with a beam of 9.4 m (30.84 ft) and a draught of 4 m (13.12 ft). Her GRT was 487 and she had a speed of 11 knots (20 km/h). Lady Odiel was propelled by a diesel engine produced by the German company Mechanical Engineering Kiel (MAK) in Kiel had a single shaft and one screw. She had IMO number 5180362.

== Fate ==
In October 1984 she was on voyage from Emden, to Peterhead, Scotland with a cargo of 560 tons drill pipes for the offshore industry with a value of 1.4 million Deutsche Mark. The voyage was under command of Swedish captain Jurgen Hansson and a Swedish crew. During the evening of 21 October there was a gale with wind foce 10 Beaufort scale and nine meters high waves. Between 9pm and 10pm drill pipes started sliding and the ship capsized. Captain Jurgen Hansson managed to send out a distress signal, but it was unnoticed. A dinghy was thrown into the water, but the captain was the only one who was able to get into it. able to reach the dinghy, but the other four people on board were unable to reach it.

== Aftermath ==
=== Rescue and search operations ===
The next morning at around 7am the captain Hanssen, being unconscious, was rescued by the Polish ship Nicolai Rej with a Russian captain. They left the dinghy in the water. Nicolai Rej sent a message to the British coastal station Radio Dover, which however, did not forward the message to the Dutch Scheveningen Radio. The West German North Sea rescue center in Bremen received the message, later it was received later by the coast guard in Great Yarmouth and it took until 11:50am before the Dutch Scheveningen Radio received the message.

Hanssen was brought by helicopter to Den Helder.

The Dutch ship Noorbetta noticed the dinghy and found Lady Odiel life jackets. A major search was initiated by the lifeboat Carlot, a Navy helicopter, a Coast Guard aircraft and the British HMS Challenger. Carlot found a capsized sloop without people. The body of Ingrid Nielsen was found in the afternoon by the helicopter and was salvaged by a British ship. Another body was seen, but was lost from sight.

The search for the wreck and people of the MV Lady Odiel continued relentlessly after the disaster. Ten days after the disaster the wreck was found by minesweeper Woerden on 30 October 1984 northwest of Terschelling. During the months after the disaster, the bodies of the other three people were found. On 1 November 1984 the first body was found near Terschelling by a fishing cutter from Den Helder. Twelve months after the disaster a body was found in the nets of a Danish cutter. In 1986, after analyzing the teeth, five fillings in the upper jaw matched with the kind reported by a dentist of a missing person from the MV Lady Odiel.

=== Salvage ===
Diver Jos Hulting from Blije received the contract for the salvage of the valuable cargo of the ship. He sold the contract to Holland Diving International from Maassluis. After 140 hours of diving, they completed the salvage of the cargo in October 1985. The last thing that was removed was the compass from the wheelhouse, however during his second dive he lost the base of the compass. It later washed up on Terschelling and is in possession of the former curator of museum 't Behouden Huys, Albert Flonk.

== Investigation ==
It was stated shortly after the disaster by a spokesperson of Scheveningen Radio that the Russian captain of the Polish ship Nicolai Rej, who found the captain of the MV Lady Odiel, that the message he sent was contrary to procedure and he didn't inform the local coastal station, which is mandatory when finding a drowning person. Due to this it was almost five hours before Scheveningen Radio received the message and therefore valuable time was lost in searching for the other drowning people. The State Police of the Netherlands in Den Helder started an investigation into it. After it became clear that the Russian captain had sent a message to the British coastal station, he had not committed a criminal offense and was not criminally prosecuted in the Netherlands.
