= Åstol =

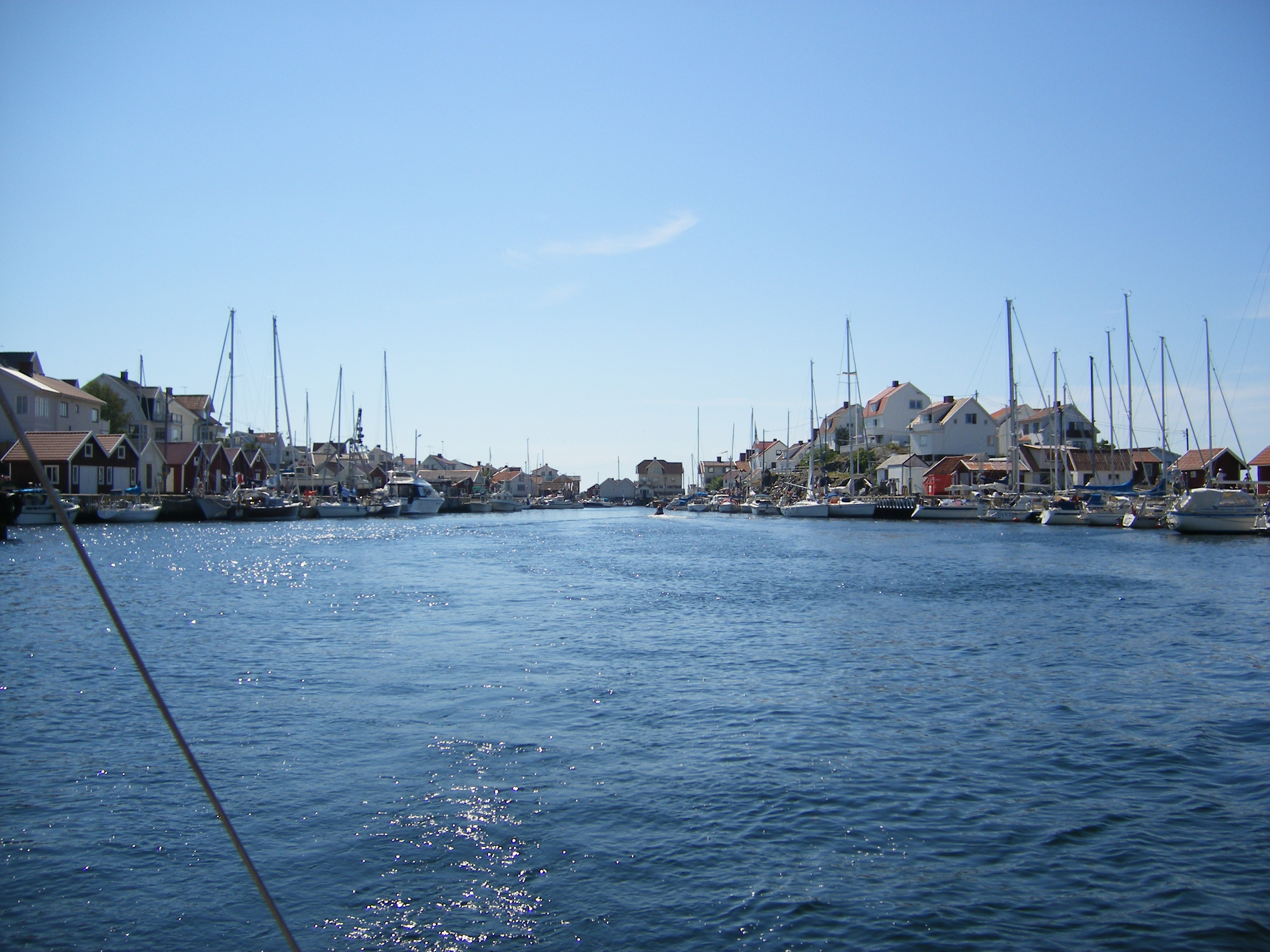
- A view of Åstol harbor

- Location within Västra Götaland Location within Sweden
- Coordinates: 57.92280°N 11.58539°E
- Country: Sweden
- Province: Bohuslän
- County: Västra Götaland County
- Municipality: Tjörn Municipality

Area
  - Total: 0.15 km^{2} (0.058 sq mi)

Population (31 December 2010)
  - Total: 210
  - Density: 1,419/km^{2} (3,680/sq mi)
- Time zone: UTC+1 (CET)
  - Summer (DST): UTC+2 (CEST)

Åstol (Swedish pronunciation: [ˈôːstuːl]) is a locality situated south of Tjörn Municipality (close to Marstrand), Västra Götaland County, Sweden with 210 inhabitants in 2010.

Åstol is an island and a locality in Tjörn Municipality in Rönnäng Parish situated in the Province of Bohuslän. In 2015, Åstol lost its status as an urban area due to its population decreasing to under 200 residents. Instead, the island came to constitute a small residential area. The island is located just south of Tjörn (near Marstrand) and has approximately 200 year-round residents. The island can be reached via the Hakefjord ferry which departs from Rönnäng on Tjörn and also serves Tjörnekalv, as well as Åstol's neighboring island, Dyrön. During the summertime, there is a ferry which connects the island to and from Marstrand.

== History ==
Åstol was known as a fishing hub with a net bindery (workshop for making fish nets), as well as an ice plant that supplied ice to both Åstol's fishing fleets and other nearby fishing camps and bunker boats. The village had amenities like a shore cash desk that provided everything needed for fishing, a number of grocery stores, and a bakery. However, by the late 1960s, there was no more space left on the island to build new homes.

The fishing industry on Åstol came to an end in the 1970s when modern steel trawlers, some only a few years old, were sold off. Administratively, Åstol was originally part of Stenkyrka parish. However, following the municipal reform in 1862, it became part of Stenkyrka rural municipality. In 1886, the Tjörnekalv municipal society was established for the locality.

From 1918 onwards, Åstol and Tjörnekalv became part of the newly formed Rönnäng rural municipality. This was later incorporated into Tjörn rural municipality in 1959, where Tjörnekalv municipal society was dissolved. Since 1971, Åstol has been part of Tjörn Municipality.

== Population development ==
Åstol's peak population consisted of around 540 inhabitants in 1960. In 2015, it lost its status as an urban area (tätort) because its population dropped below 200 people, instead becoming a small residential area (småort).

== Community ==
Åstols Handelsbod is the only operating grocery store on the island and is open year-round. It encompasses both a post office and a Systembolaget. In the middle of the harbor is Åstol's café, housed in an old warehouse. There is also a fishing boat tour, boat Hajen (The Shark), which takes sports fishers out to the sea.

== Culture ==
Åstol is renowned for hosting folk music evenings in a converted smokehouse, Åstols Rökeri, located at the end of the harbor.

The island gained further recognition when the Swedish comedy troupes Galenskaparna and After Shave filmed their satirical story "Åke från Åstol" there in the summer of 1998. This was a parody of the famous musical "Kristina från Duvemåla."

Additionally, music groups Coldtears and Åstolpojkarna both originated from Åstol.
