= Klädesholmen =

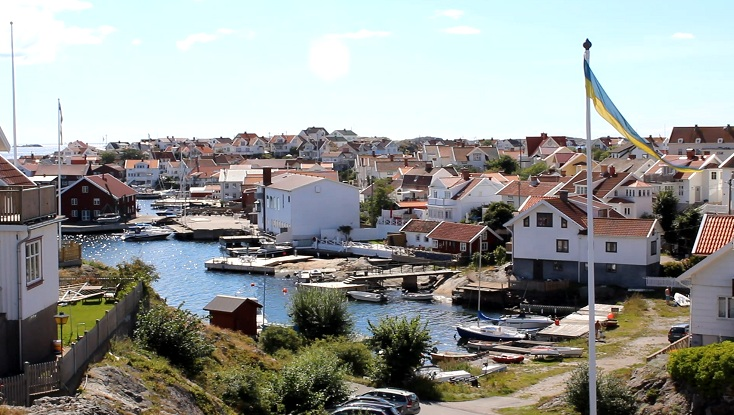

- Location within Västra Götaland Location within Sweden
- Coordinates: 57°57′N 11°32′E
- Country: Sweden
- Province: Bohuslän
- County: Västra Götaland County
- Municipality: Tjörn Municipality

Area
  - Total: 0.29 km^{2} (0.11 sq mi)

Population (31 December 2010)
  - Total: 385
  - Density: 1,335/km^{2} (3,460/sq mi)
- Time zone: UTC+1 (CET)
  - Summer (DST): UTC+2 (CEST)

Klädesholmen is an island and village that is located in the Tjörn Municipality of Bohuslän, Sweden. The urban area, with 385 inhabitants in 2010, located on two small islands, Klädesholmen and Koholmen, is connected to Tjörn via a bridge to Bleket. The islands were formerly crown islets, where fishermen had the right to settle.

Already in the fifteenth century Klädesholmen was a well-known fishing location outside Tjörn.
