= 2007 Division 1 (Swedish football) =

Division 1
- Season: 2007
- Champions: Assyriska FF (north); Qviding FIF (south)
- Promoted: Assyriska FF; FC Väsby United; Qviding FIF; Ängelholms FF
- Relegated: Skiljebo SK; IFK Timrå; Kristianstads FF; Visby Gute

The 2007 Division 1 was contested by 28 teams divided into two groups geographically. Assyriska FF and Qviding FIF won their respective groups, and were thereby promoted to Superettan for the 2008 season. Second place teams FC Väsby United and Ängelholms FF were also promoted after having each won their playoffs against teams from Superettan.

== League tables ==
=== North ===
Pos	Team	Pld	W	D	L	GF	GA	GD	Pts	Promotion or relegation
1	Assyriska FF (C, P)	26	17	3	6	53	27	+26	54	Promotion to Superettan
2	FC Väsby United (P)	26	15	6	5	51	31	+20	51	Promotion to Superettan
3	Vasalund/Essinge IF	26	15	4	7	54	29	+25	49	
4	Syrianska FC	26	14	4	8	37	28	+9	46	
5	BK Forward	26	11	8	7	43	28	+15	41	
6	Västerås SK	26	11	4	11	45	39	+6	37	
7	Boden	26	11	4	11	26	33	−7	37	
8	Umeå FC	26	10	5	11	50	43	+7	35	
9	Falu FK	26	8	7	11	31	44	−13	31	
10	Gröndal	26	8	6	12	32	45	−13	30	
11	Östersunds FK	26	7	8	11	39	40	−1	29	
12	Valsta Syrianska IK	26	7	8	11	31	33	−2	29	
13	Skiljebo SK (R)	26	6	9	11	28	43	−15	27	Relegation to Division 2
14	IFK Timrå (R)	26	1	6	19	20	77	−57	9	Relegation to Division 2

Source: svenskfotboll.se (in Swedish)
Rules for classification: 1) points; 2) goal difference; 3) number of goals scored.
(C) Champions; (P) Promoted; (R) Relegated

=== South ===
Pos	Team	Pld	W	D	L	GF	GA	GD	Pts	Promotion or relegation
1	Qviding FIF (C, P)	26	19	3	4	72	29	+43	60	Promotion to Superettan
2	Ängelholms FF (P)	26	18	1	7	76	37	+39	55	Promotion to Superettan
3	Västra Frölunda	26	14	8	4	43	23	+20	50	
4	IFK Malmö	26	15	3	8	58	46	+12	48	
5	IFK Värnamo	26	12	6	8	50	36	+14	42	
6	FC Trollhättan	26	10	6	10	40	33	+7	36	
7	Carlstad United BK	26	9	6	11	39	45	−6	33	
8	Skövde AIK	26	8	9	9	37	46	−9	33	
9	Husqvarna FF	26	8	5	13	24	41	−17	29	
10	Norrby IF	26	7	7	12	38	57	−19	28	
11	Torslanda IK	26	6	9	11	33	43	−10	27	
12	Skärhamns IK	26	7	6	13	38	56	−18	27	
13	Kristianstads FF (R)	26	7	3	16	40	61	−21	24	Relegation to Division 2
14	Visby IF Gute (R)	26	4	4	18	34	69	−35	16	Relegation to Division 2

Source: svenskfotboll.se (in Swedish)
Rules for classification: 1) points; 2) goal difference; 3) number of goals scored.
(C) Champions; (P) Promoted; (R) Relegated

== Young Player Teams of the Year ==
At the end of each Division 1 season an all-star game is played called "Morgondagens Stjärnor" (English: "The Stars Of Tomorrow"). The two teams playing against each other consist of the best young players from each of the two leagues.

Team North
Position	Player	Club
GK	(Sweden) Erik Biselius	Västerås SK
GK	(Sweden) Dejan Garača	BK Forward
DF	(Sweden) Joakim Morén	Falu FK
DF	(Sweden) Niklas Backman	Skiljebo SK
DF	(Sweden) Oscar Pehrsson	Västerås SK
DF	(Sweden) Markus Ståhl	Valsta Syrianska IK
DF	(Sweden) Ted Fontér	Gröndals IK
MF / FW	(Sweden) Gabriel Rhawi	Assyriska FF
MF / FW	(Sweden) Per Johansson	BK Forward
MF / FW	(Sweden) Daniel Badjelan	Vasalund/Essinge IF
MF / FW	(Sweden) George Moussally	Vasalund/Essinge IF
MF / FW	(Sweden) Mauricio Albornoz	Gröndals IK
MF / FW	(Sweden) Temesgen Berhane	Västerås SK
MF / FW	(Sweden) Jack Jobran	Vasalund/Essinge IF
MF / FW	(Sweden) Magnus Eriksson	FC Väsby United
MF / FW	(Sweden) Jiloan Hamad	BK Forward
MF / FW	(Sweden) Sebastian Waldenström	Vasalund/Essinge IF
Coach	(Sweden) Mikael Stahre	FC Väsby United

Team South
Position	Player	Club
GK	(Sweden) Jakob Skarp	Kristianstads FF
DF	(Sweden) David Hernea	Norrby IF
DF	(Sweden) Kyle Konwea	Qviding FIF
DF	(Sweden) Marcus Axelsson	Skärhamns IK
DF	(Sweden) Erik Olsson	Skärhamns IK
MF / FW	(Sweden) Daniel Jovanovic	IFK Malmö
MF / FW	(Sweden) Fredrik Apell	Torslanda IK
MF / FW	(Sweden) Erik Wennberg	Carlstad United BK
MF / FW	(Sweden) Mattias Lagerstedt	IFK Malmö
MF / FW	(Sweden) Niklas Andersson	Kristianstads FF
MF / FW	(Sweden) Renzo Di Negro	Norrby IF
MF / FW	(Sweden) Emil Salomonsson	Ängelholms FF
MF / FW	(Sweden) Tobias Sana	Qviding FIF
MF / FW	(Sweden) Jonas Lindberg	Skövde AIK
MF / FW	(Sweden) Joachim Persson	IFK Malmö
Coach	(Sweden) Glenn Schiller	
