= Stora Dyrön =

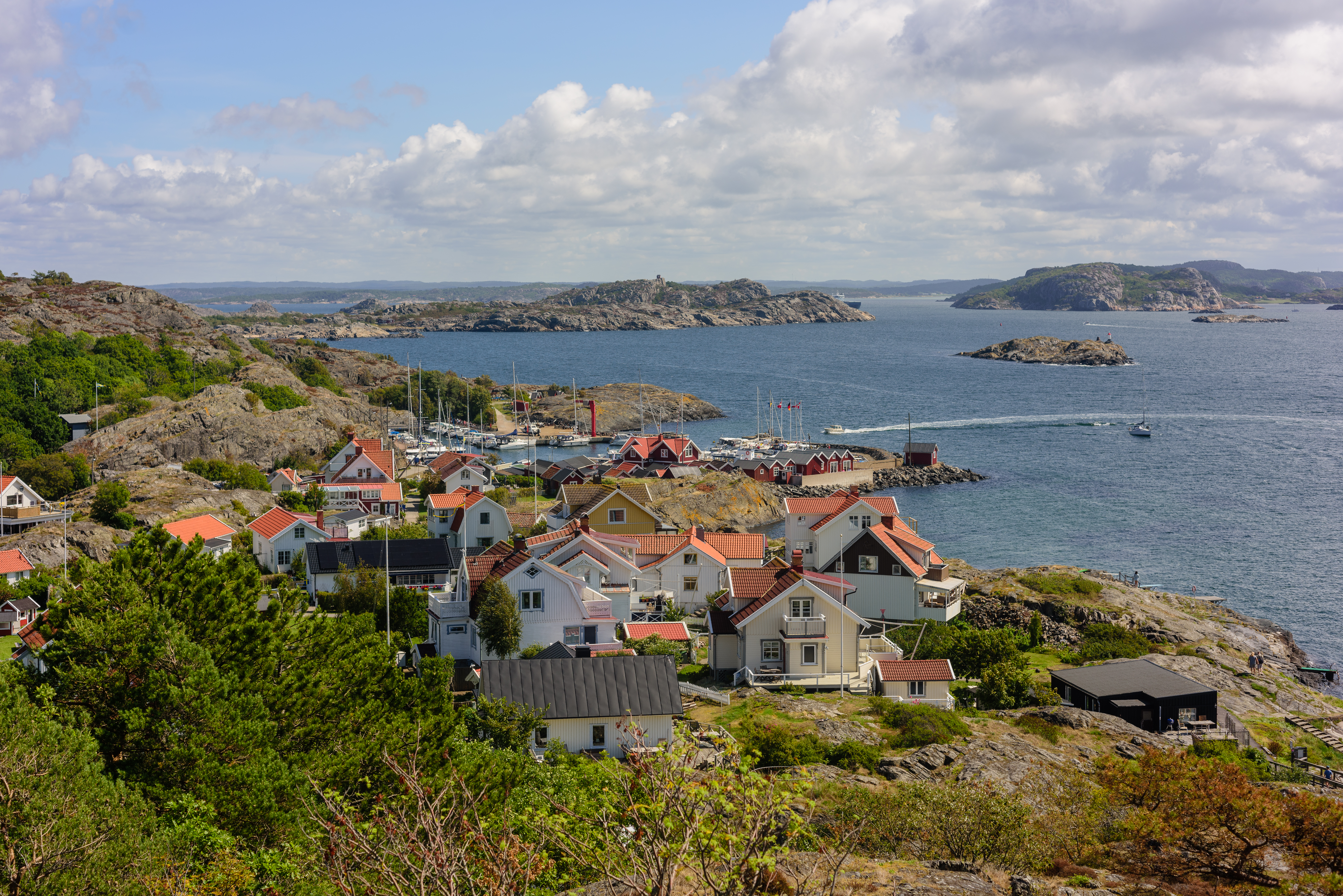
- Stora Dyrön 2023.

- Location within Västra Götaland Location within Sweden
- Coordinates: 57°56′N 11°37′E
- Country: Sweden
- Province: Bohuslän
- County: Västra Götaland County
- Municipality: Tjörn Municipality

Area
  - Total: 0.24 km^{2} (0.093 sq mi)

Population (31 December 2010)
  - Total: 250
  - Density: 1,049/km^{2} (2,720/sq mi)
- Time zone: UTC+1 (CET)
  - Summer (DST): UTC+2 (CEST)

Stora Dyrön is an island and a locality situated in Tjörn Municipality, Västra Götaland County, Sweden with 250 inhabitants in 2010.
