= Tjörn =

Large island in Bohuslän, Sweden

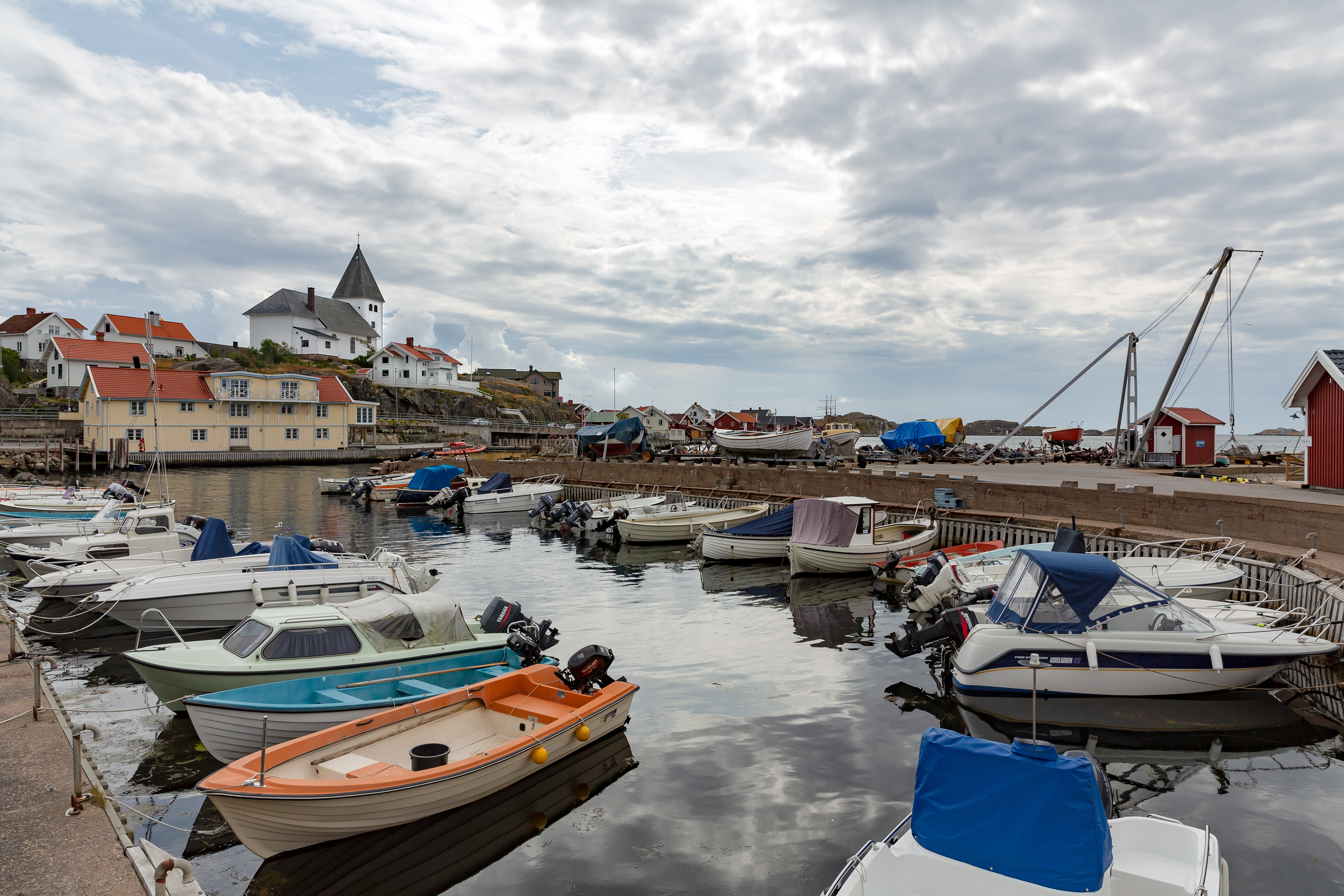
- Interactive map of Tjörn

Geography
- Coordinates: 58°01′N 11°38′E
- Area: 147.54 km^{2} (56.97 sq mi)

Administration
- Sweden
- County: Västra Götaland
- Municipality: Tjörn

Tjörn (Swedish pronunciation: [ˈɕœːɳ]) is the sixth largest island in Sweden, located on the Swedish west coast in the province of Bohuslän.

The area of the island is 147 square kilometres (57 sq mi), and the area of the municipality is 168 square kilometres (65 sq mi). The population, as of 2017, was 15,774 people.

== Geography ==
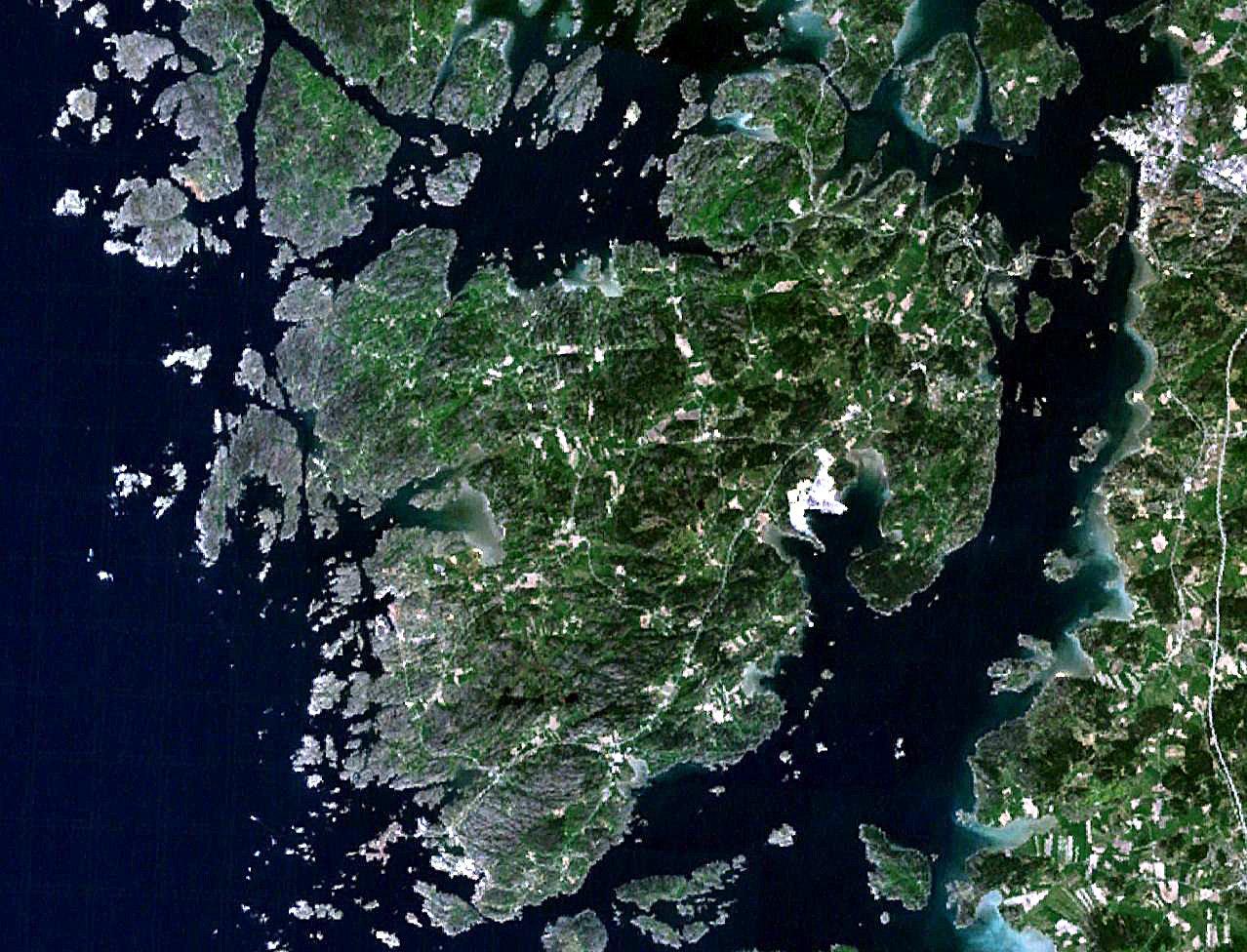
Satellite image of Tjörn

Tjörn is connected in the east to the town of Stenungsund on the mainland by the Tjörn Bridge, and to the island of Orust in the north by the Skåpesund bridge.

The largest town is Skärhamn, and it is also the municipal capital. Other communities, many of which are fishing communities, include Rönnäng, Klädesholmen, and Kyrkesund. The peninsula of Mjörn has large shell banks.

== Climate ==
Tjörn has a maritime climate influenced by its location off the coastline. Even so, the proximity to the mainland means that the weather station of Rörastrand more resembles a mainland coastal climate than one of the archipelago.

Climate data for Rörastrand (2002–2021 averages, extremes since 1961 including Säby)
| Month | Jan | Feb | Mar | Apr | May | Jun | Jul | Aug | Sep | Oct | Nov | Dec | Year |
|---|---|---|---|---|---|---|---|---|---|---|---|---|---|
| Record high °C (°F) | 10.4 (50.7) | 10.8 (51.4) | 17.1 (62.8) | 26.8 (80.2) | 30.1 (86.2) | 30.4 (86.7) | 32.3 (90.1) | 32.5 (90.5) | 26.3 (79.3) | 21.1 (70.0) | 14.6 (58.3) | 11.1 (52.0) | 32.5 (90.5) |
| Mean maximum °C (°F) | 7.4 (45.3) | 7.7 (45.9) | 12.3 (54.1) | 18.6 (65.5) | 23.7 (74.7) | 26.5 (79.7) | 28.1 (82.6) | 27.2 (81.0) | 23.0 (73.4) | 16.7 (62.1) | 11.9 (53.4) | 8.5 (47.3) | 29.5 (85.1) |
| Mean daily maximum °C (°F) | 2.4 (36.3) | 2.6 (36.7) | 6.2 (43.2) | 11.8 (53.2) | 16.4 (61.5) | 20.0 (68.0) | 22.1 (71.8) | 21.3 (70.3) | 17.6 (63.7) | 11.8 (53.2) | 7.2 (45.0) | 4.1 (39.4) | 12.0 (53.5) |
| Daily mean °C (°F) | 0.1 (32.2) | 0.1 (32.2) | 2.7 (36.9) | 7.2 (45.0) | 11.8 (53.2) | 15.5 (59.9) | 17.9 (64.2) | 17.3 (63.1) | 13.9 (57.0) | 8.7 (47.7) | 5.0 (41.0) | 1.9 (35.4) | 8.5 (47.3) |
| Mean daily minimum °C (°F) | −2.3 (27.9) | −2.5 (27.5) | −0.9 (30.4) | 2.6 (36.7) | 7.2 (45.0) | 11.0 (51.8) | 13.6 (56.5) | 13.2 (55.8) | 10.2 (50.4) | 5.6 (42.1) | 2.7 (36.9) | −0.4 (31.3) | 5.0 (41.0) |
| Mean minimum °C (°F) | −11.9 (10.6) | −10.5 (13.1) | −8.2 (17.2) | −3.6 (25.5) | 0.4 (32.7) | 5.7 (42.3) | 8.8 (47.8) | 7.4 (45.3) | 3.0 (37.4) | −2.2 (28.0) | −5.6 (21.9) | −9.1 (15.6) | −14.4 (6.1) |
| Record low °C (°F) | −26.9 (−16.4) | −31.1 (−24.0) | −21.2 (−6.2) | −8.6 (16.5) | −4.0 (24.8) | 0.7 (33.3) | 4.0 (39.2) | 2.0 (35.6) | −3.0 (26.6) | −9.0 (15.8) | −15.7 (3.7) | −23.2 (−9.8) | −31.1 (−24.0) |
| Average precipitation mm (inches) | 85.4 (3.36) | 66.9 (2.63) | 56.7 (2.23) | 51.3 (2.02) | 58.8 (2.31) | 69.8 (2.75) | 85.3 (3.36) | 102.3 (4.03) | 91.3 (3.59) | 113.6 (4.47) | 96.8 (3.81) | 91.5 (3.60) | 969.7 (38.16) |
| Average extreme snow depth cm (inches) | 12 (4.7) | 13 (5.1) | 8 (3.1) | 0 (0) | 0 (0) | 0 (0) | 0 (0) | 0 (0) | 0 (0) | 1 (0.4) | 2 (0.8) | 7 (2.8) | 19 (7.5) |
| Average precipitation days (≥ 1 mm) | 13 | 10 | 9 | 8 | 10 | 10 | 10 | 12 | 11 | 13 | 14 | 14 | 134 |
Source 1: SMHI Open Data for Rörastrand, precipitation
Source 2: SMHI Open Data for Rörastrand, temperature

== Tourism ==
During the summer, the population swells from 15,000 to 45,000 as vacationers arrive for yachting and swimming. Skärhamn has a guest harbor to accommodate yachters travelling along the Swedish west coast.

== See also ==
- Tjörn Municipality
- Tjörn Hundred
