= Kållekärr =

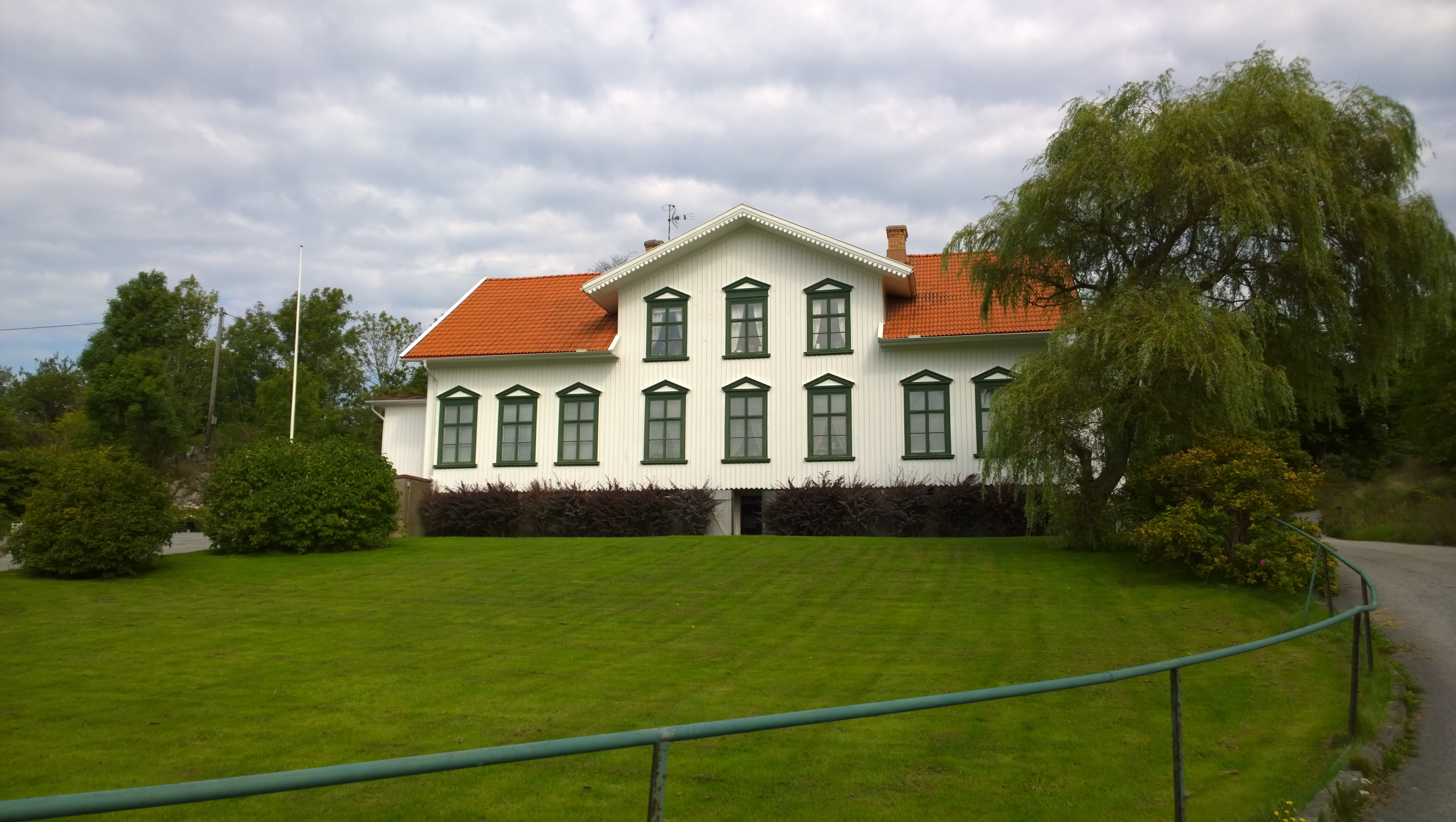
- Kållekärr Doctor's House

- Location within Västra Götaland Location within Sweden
- Coordinates: 58°01′N 11°39′E
- Country: Sweden
- Province: Bohuslän
- County: Västra Götaland County
- Municipality: Tjörn Municipality

Area
  - Total: 0.54 km^{2} (0.21 sq mi)

Population (31 December 2010)
  - Total: 560
  - Density: 1,040/km^{2} (2,700/sq mi)
- Time zone: UTC+1 (CET)
  - Summer (DST): UTC+2 (CEST)

Kållekärr is a locality situated in Tjörn Municipality, Västra Götaland County, Sweden, with 560 inhabitants in 2010.
