= Skärhamns IK =

Swedish football club

- Full name: Skärhamns Idrottsklubb
- Founded: 1932
- Ground: Tjörns Sparbank Arena; Skärhamn; Sweden
- Capacity: 2,000
- Head coach: Markus Johansson
- Coach: Jesper Widenbäck
- League: Division 4 Västra Götaland
- 2024: Division 4 Västra Götaland,
Home colours

Skärhamns IK is a Swedish football club located in Skärhamn in Västra Götaland County.

== Background ==
Since their foundation on 13 October 1932 Skärhamns IK has participated mainly in the middle and lower divisions of the Swedish football league system. The club currently plays in Division 4 Bohuslän/Dal which is the sixth tier of Swedish football. Their best achievement was from 2006 to 2008 when they played in Division 1 Södra. They play their home matches at the Tjörns Sparbank Arena in Skärhamn.

Skärhamns IK are affiliated to the Bohusläns Fotbollförbund.

== Season to season ==
Season	Level	Division	Section	Position	Movements
1993	Tier 4	Division 3	Nordvästra Götaland	9th	
1994	Tier 4	Division 3	Nordvästra Götaland	7th	
1995	Tier 4	Division 3	Nordvästra Götaland	9th	Relegation Playoffs
1996	Tier 4	Division 3	Nordvästra Götaland	4th	
1997	Tier 4	Division 3	Nordvästra Götaland	3rd	
1998	Tier 4	Division 3	Nordvästra Götaland	1st	Promoted
1999	Tier 3	Division 2	Västra Götaland	9th	Relegated
2000	Tier 4	Division 3	Nordvästra Götaland	1st	Promoted
2001	Tier 3	Division 2	Västra Götaland	8th	
2002	Tier 3	Division 2	Västra Götaland	5th	
2003	Tier 3	Division 2	Västra Götaland	8th	
2004	Tier 3	Division 2	Västra Götaland	5th	
2005	Tier 3	Division 2	Västra Götaland	3rd	Promoted
2006*	Tier 3	Division 1	Södra	9th	
2007	Tier 3	Division 1	Södra	12th	
2008	Tier 3	Division 1	Södra	14th	Relegated
2009	Tier 4	Division 2	Västra Götaland	10th	Relegation Playoffs
2010	Tier 4	Division 2	Västra Götaland	11th	Relegated

* League restructuring in 2006 resulted in a new division being created at Tier 3 and subsequent divisions dropping a level.
