= Nordic Watercolour Museum =

Nordiska Akvarellmuseet
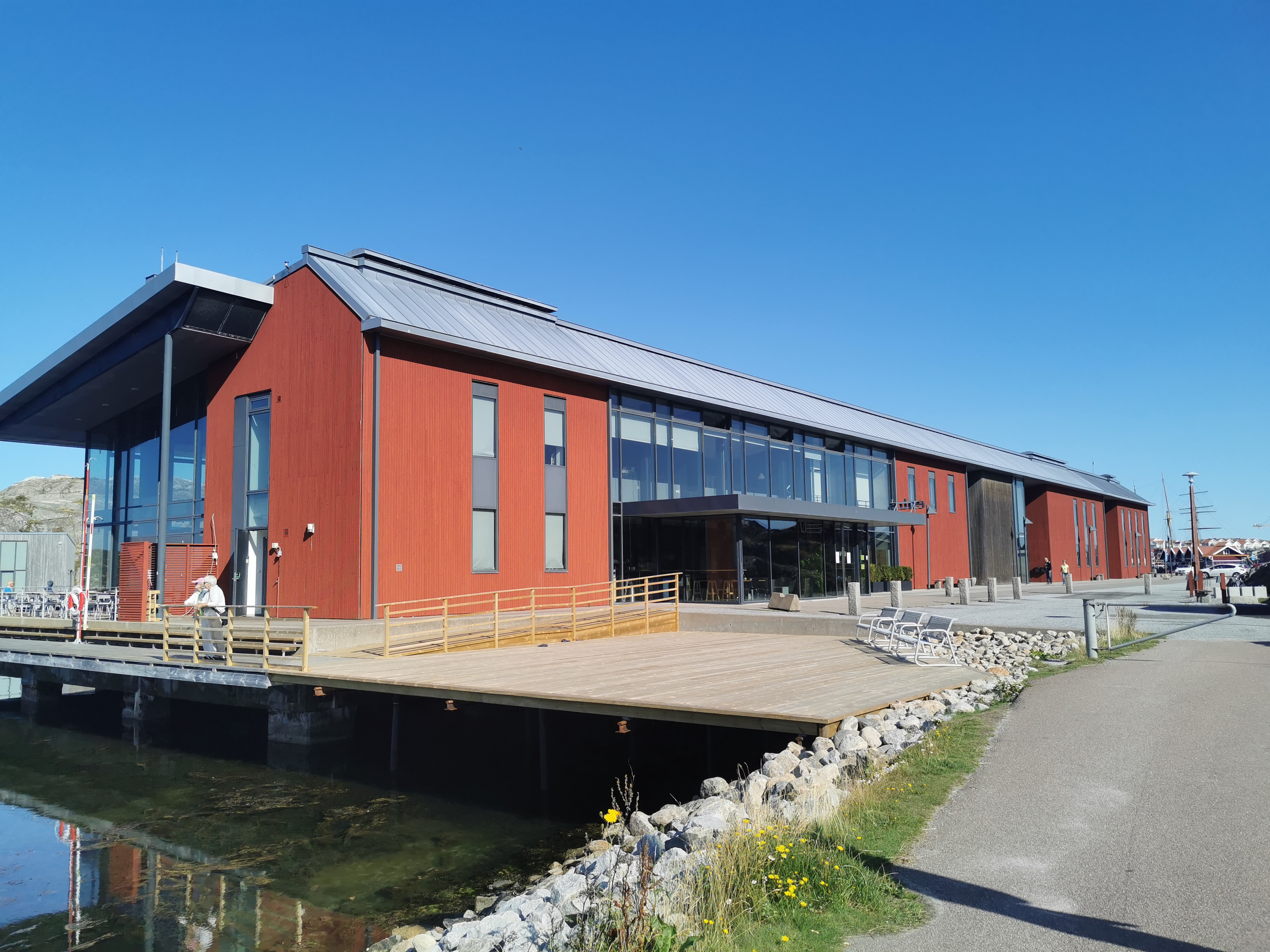
- Nordic Watercolour Museum building

- Location within Västra Götaland
- Established: 2000
- Location: Tjörn, Sweden
- Coordinates: 57°59′16″N 11°32′25″E
- Type: Art museum

The Nordic Watercolour Museum (Swedish: Nordiska Akvarellmuseet) is a museum, artist workshop and research facility in Skärhamn on the island of Tjörn in Sweden, opened in 2000.

The architects behind the museum, painted in the typical Swedish Falu red colour, are the Danes Niels Bruun and Henrik Corfitsen, who won the assignment after an international competition. An extension built in 2012 was designed by Anders Tengbom.

The museum was Swedish Museum of the Year in 2010, and in 2011 it and the newspaper Göteborgs-Posten won the 2010 Swedish Arts and Business Awards for their marketing collaboration. In 2015 it celebrated its fifteenth anniversary and started a new book series, Vattenkonst Nordiska Akvarellmuseet.

== Guest studios ==
The museum has five guest studios available to artists and the general public. The studios support artistic collaboration for public programs, study courses, publications, lectures and offer artists opportunities for studio visits.

== Publications ==
- Johnson, Mark Dean. Pacific Light: A Survey of Californian Watercolour 1908-2008 (English and Norwegian). 2008.
- Nordal, Bera. Children's Picture Books: The Contemporary Story. 2007.
- Zorn, Anders. Watercolours. 2004.
