= Bleket =

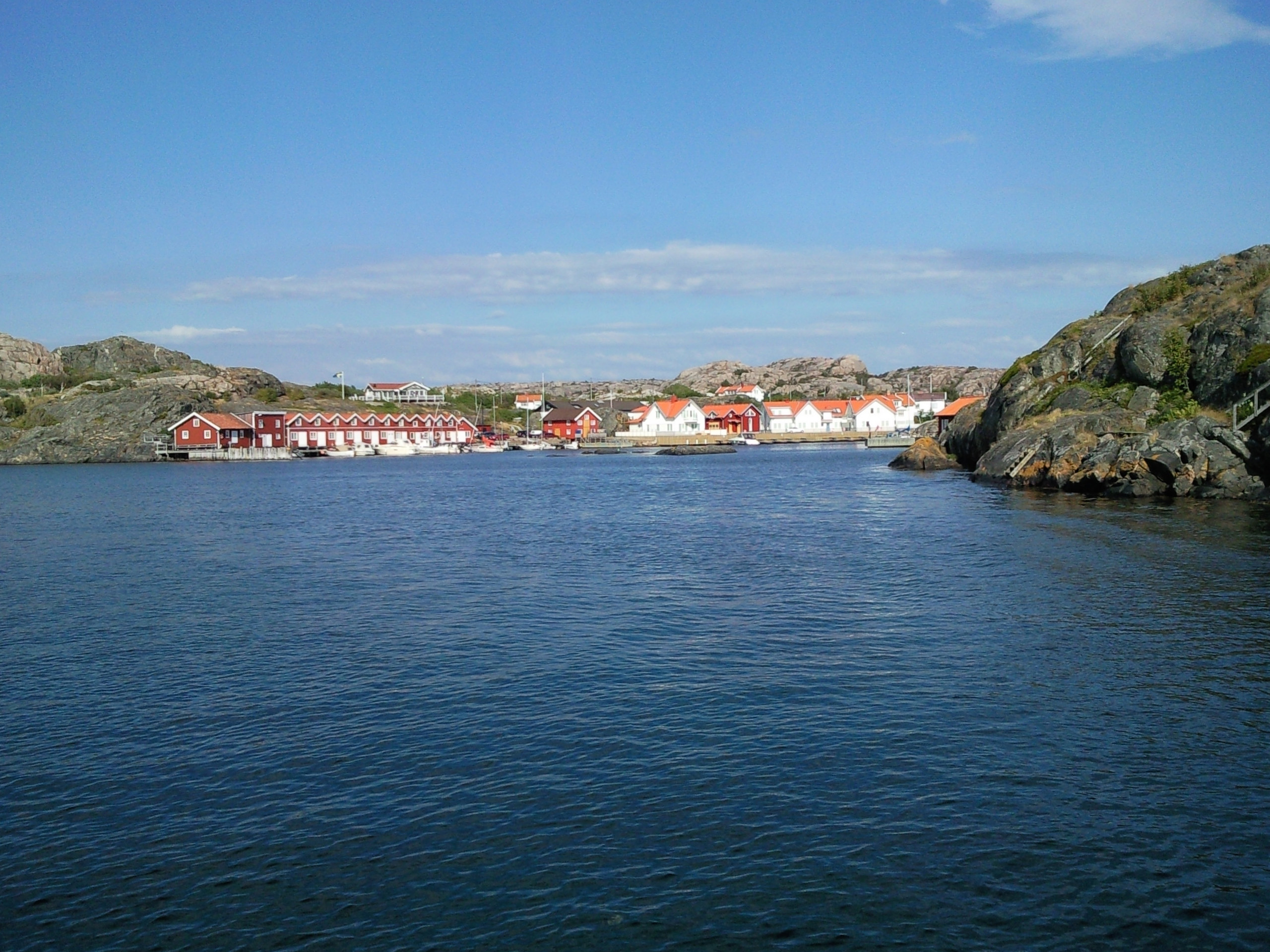

- Location within Västra Götaland Location within Sweden
- Coordinates: 57°57′N 11°34′E
- Country: Sweden
- Province: Bohuslän
- County: Västra Götaland County
- Municipality: Tjörn Municipality

Area
  - Total: 0.41 km^{2} (0.16 sq mi)

Population (31 December 2010)
  - Total: 240
  - Density: 585/km^{2} (1,520/sq mi)
- Time zone: UTC+1 (CET)
  - Summer (DST): UTC+2 (CEST)

Bleket is a locality situated in Tjörn Municipality, Bohuslän, Västra Götaland County, Sweden with 240 inhabitants in 2010.
