= IFK Timrå =

Swedish football club

- Full name: Idrottsföreningen Kamraterna Timrå
- Founded: 9 January 1978
- Ground: Timrå IP; Timrå; Sweden
- Chairman: Lars Edström
- Coach: Hans Lundberg; Patrik Göthe; Stefan Lindqvist
- League: Division 6
- 2019: Division 2 Norrland, 8th
Home colours	Away colours

IFK Timrå is a Swedish football club located in Timrå in Västernorrland County.

== Background ==
Idrottsföreningen Kamraterna Timrå was formed on 9 January 1978 as a spin-off from Timra IK with the emphasis from an early stage on youth development. IFK Timra is now one of Norrland's largest football clubs, with around 1,200 members, of whom about 600 are active participants. The Youth Section currently has approximately 500 active members who are catered for by around 30 teams, from the age of 8 to junior level. The club is supported by Timrå municipality and local companies and many volunteer leaders and parents who ensure the club and its youth activities are effective.

Since their foundation IFK Timrå has participated mainly in the middle divisions of the Swedish football league system. In 2010 the club played in Division 3 Mellersta Norrland, which is the fifth tier of Swedish football, but finished in a relegation position and therefore will play in Division 4 in 2011. In 2007 they reached Division 1 Norra but their stay at this level was brief and then a downward decline set in. They play their home matches at the Timrå IP in Timrå. The club also makes use of grass pitches at Fagervik.

IFK Timrå are affiliated to the Medelpads Fotbollförbund.

The club arranges an annual football tournament, the Mid Nordic Cup, which is played at the Fagervik playing fields in Timrå.

In October 2001, the club was awarded the Gunnar Nordahl Scholarship.

== Season to season ==
Season	Level	Division	Section	Position	Movements
1995	Tier 6	Division 5	Medelpad		Promoted
1996	Tier 5	Division 4	Medelpad	3rd	
1997	Tier 5	Division 4	Medelpad	5th	
1998	Tier 5	Division 4	Medelpad	1st	Promoted
1999	Tier 4	Division 3	Mellersta Norrland	1st	Promoted
2000	Tier 3	Division 2	Norrland	12th	Relegated
2001	Tier 4	Division 3	Mellersta Norrland	1st	Promoted
2002	Tier 3	Division 2	Norrland	6th	
2003	Tier 3	Division 2	Norrland	8th	
2004	Tier 3	Division 2	Norrland	2nd	
2005	Tier 3	Division 2	Norrland	9th	
2006*	Tier 4	Division 2	Norrland	1st	Promoted
2007	Tier 3	Division 1	Norra	14th	Relegated
2008	Tier 4	Division 2	Norrland	11th	Relegated
2009	Tier 5	Division 3	Mellersta Norrland	8th	
2010	Tier 5	Division 3	Mellersta Norrland	12th	Relegated

* League restructuring in 2006 resulted in a new division being created at Tier 3 and subsequent divisions dropping a level.

== Attendances ==
In recent seasons IFK Timrå have had the following average attendances:

Season	Average attendance	Division / Section	Level
2005	228	Div 2 Norrland	Tier 4
2006	318	Div 2 Norrland	Tier 4
2007	188	Div 1 Norra	Tier 3
2008	135	Div 2 Norrland	Tier 4
2009	115	Div 3 Mellersta Norrland	Tier 5
2010	84	Div 3 Mellersta Norrland	Tier 5

* Attendances are provided in the Publikliga sections of the Svenska Fotbollförbundet website.

The attendance record was set on 5 May 2004 when 2,706 spectators attended the Swedish Cup match with Djurgårdens IF.
