= Tjörn Municipality =

Tjörn Municipality Tjörns kommun
- Municipality
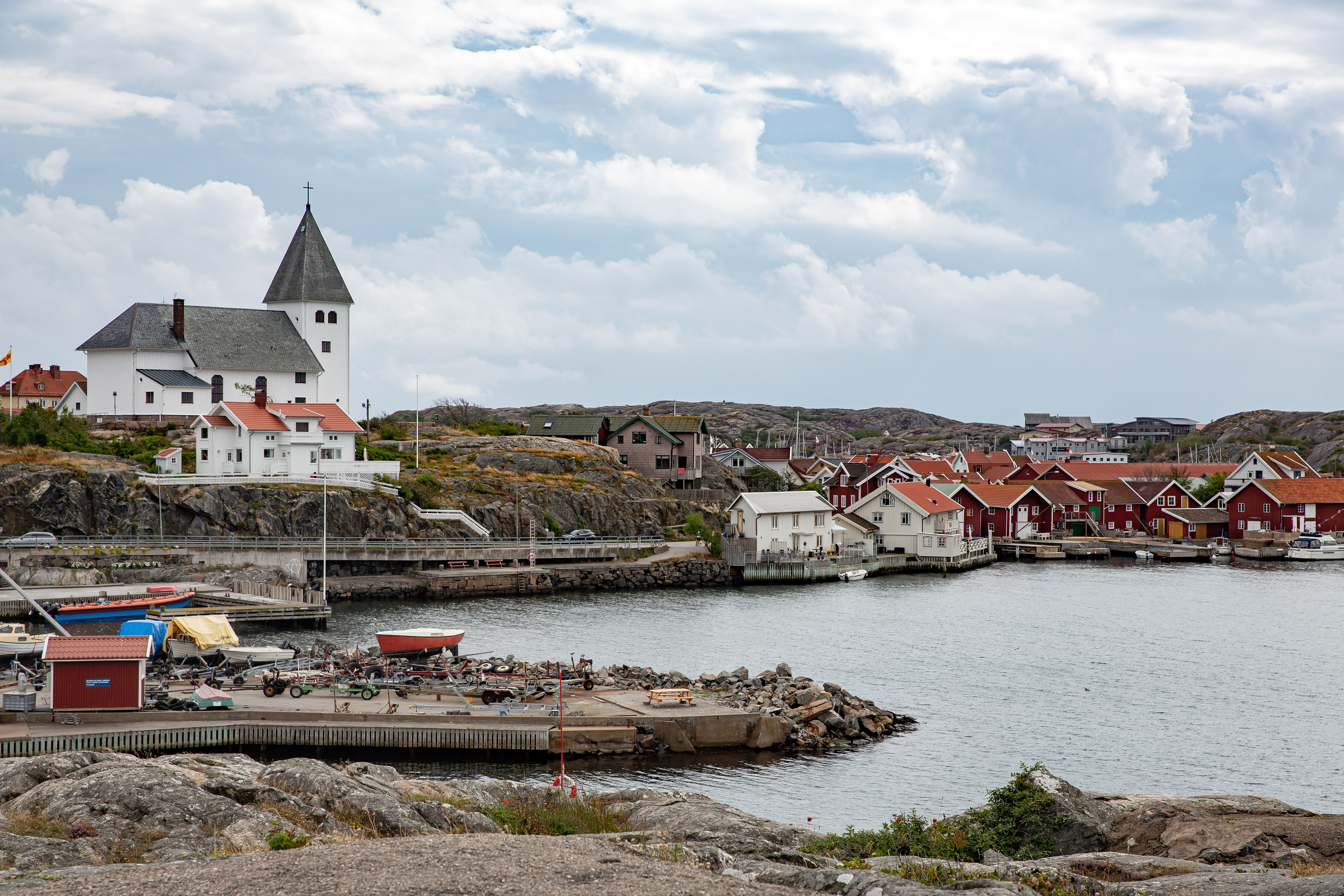

- Coat of arms

- Coordinates: 58°00′N 11°33′E
- Country: Sweden
- County: Västra Götaland County
- Seat: Skärhamn

Area
  - Total: 845.94 km^{2} (326.62 sq mi)
  - Land: 167.36 km^{2} (64.62 sq mi)
  - Water: 678.58 km^{2} (262.00 sq mi)
- Area as of 1 January 2014.

Population (30 June 2025)
  - Total: 16,078
  - Density: 96.068/km^{2} (248.82/sq mi)
- Time zone: UTC+1 (CET)
  - Summer (DST): UTC+2 (CEST)
- ISO 3166 code: SE
- Province: Bohuslän
- Municipal code: 1419
- Website: www.tjorn.se

Tjörn Municipality (Swedish: Tjörns kommun) is a municipality that covers the island of Tjörn in Västra Götaland County in western Sweden. Its seat is located in the town of Skärhamn.

Tjörn is the sixth largest Swedish island. It is located in the province of Bohuslän.

The former municipal entities on the island and adjacent islets were united to form Tjörn Municipality in 1952.

For centuries the local economy was dominated by fishing and boat building. The largest employers are still the shipping company TransAtlantic (formerly known as B&N) and the shipyards Djupviks varv and Rönnängs varv.

== Geography ==
Tjörn is connected in the east to the town of Stenungsund on the mainland by the Tjörn bridge, and in the north to the island of Orust by the Skåpesund bridge. The municipal seat is Skärhamn. Other communities, many of which are the fishing communities, include Rönnäng, Klädesholmen and Kyrkesund. The island of Mjörn, north-east of Tjörn, has large shell banks.

=== Localities ===
- Bleket
- Dyrön
- Klädesholmen
- Kyrkesund
- Kållekärr
- Myggenäs
- Rönnäng
- Skärhamn
- Åstol

== Demographics ==
This is a demographic table based on Tjörn Municipality's electoral districts in the 2022 Swedish general election sourced from SVT's election platform, in turn taken from SCB official statistics.

In total there were 16,293 residents, including 12,792 Swedish citizens of voting age. 38.6% voted for the left coalition and 60.5% for the right coalition. Indicators are in percentage points except population totals and income.

Location	Residents	Citizen adults	Left vote	Right vote	Employed	Swedish parents	Foreign heritage	Income SEK	Degree
Location			%	%					
Bleket-Klädesholmen	1,251	1,049	34.2	64.8	80	92	8	29,420	46
Höviksnäs-Hakenäset	2,087	1,572	44.0	55.3	83	89	11	28,938	43
Klövedal	1,396	1,175	49.0	49.9	83	92	8	25,791	39
Kållekärr	1,323	962	42.2	57.3	85	82	18	26,023	33
Myggenäs	1,523	1,108	38.2	60.5	89	89	11	30,438	47
Norra Skärhamn	1,654	1,316	36.0	63.0	80	85	15	26,373	41
Rönnäng	1,989	1,545	31.2	67.9	85	90	10	27,048	37
Stenkyrka	1,445	1,113	39.8	59.3	86	90	10	28,191	35
Södra Skärhamn	1,938	1,598	30.9	68.6	84	90	10	28,964	42
Valla	1,687	1,354	43.6	55.5	87	88	12	29,029	41
Source: SVT

== Tourism ==
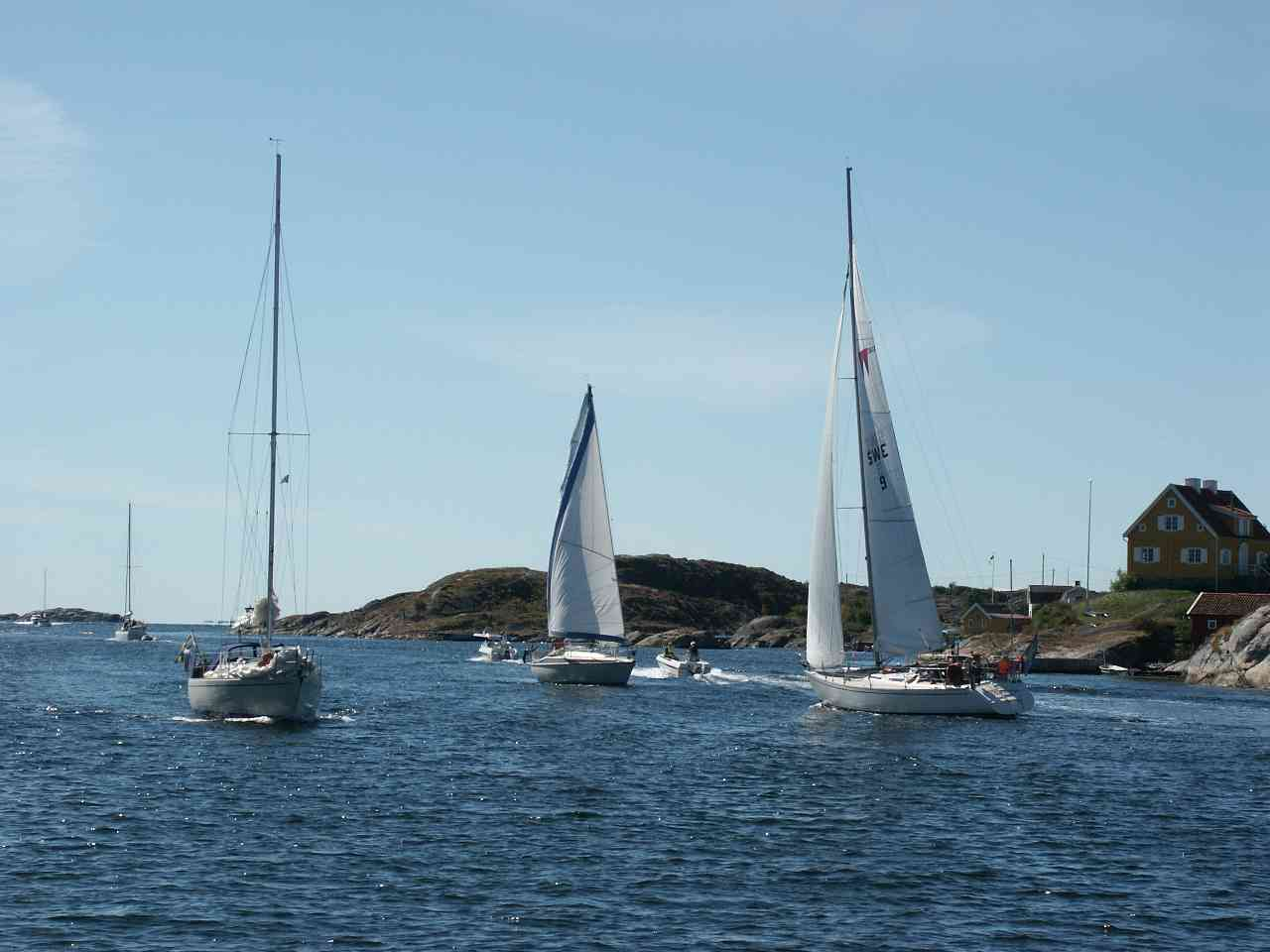
Boats at Kyrkesund, Tjörn

During the summer, the population swells from 10,000 to 20,000 to 30,000 as vacationers arrive for yachting and swimming. Skärhamn has an ample guest harbour to accommodate yachters travelling along the Swedish west coast. The town of Skärhamn is the location of the Nordic Watercolour Museum (Akvarellmuseet).

== See also ==
- Tjörn Hundred
