= Skärhamn =

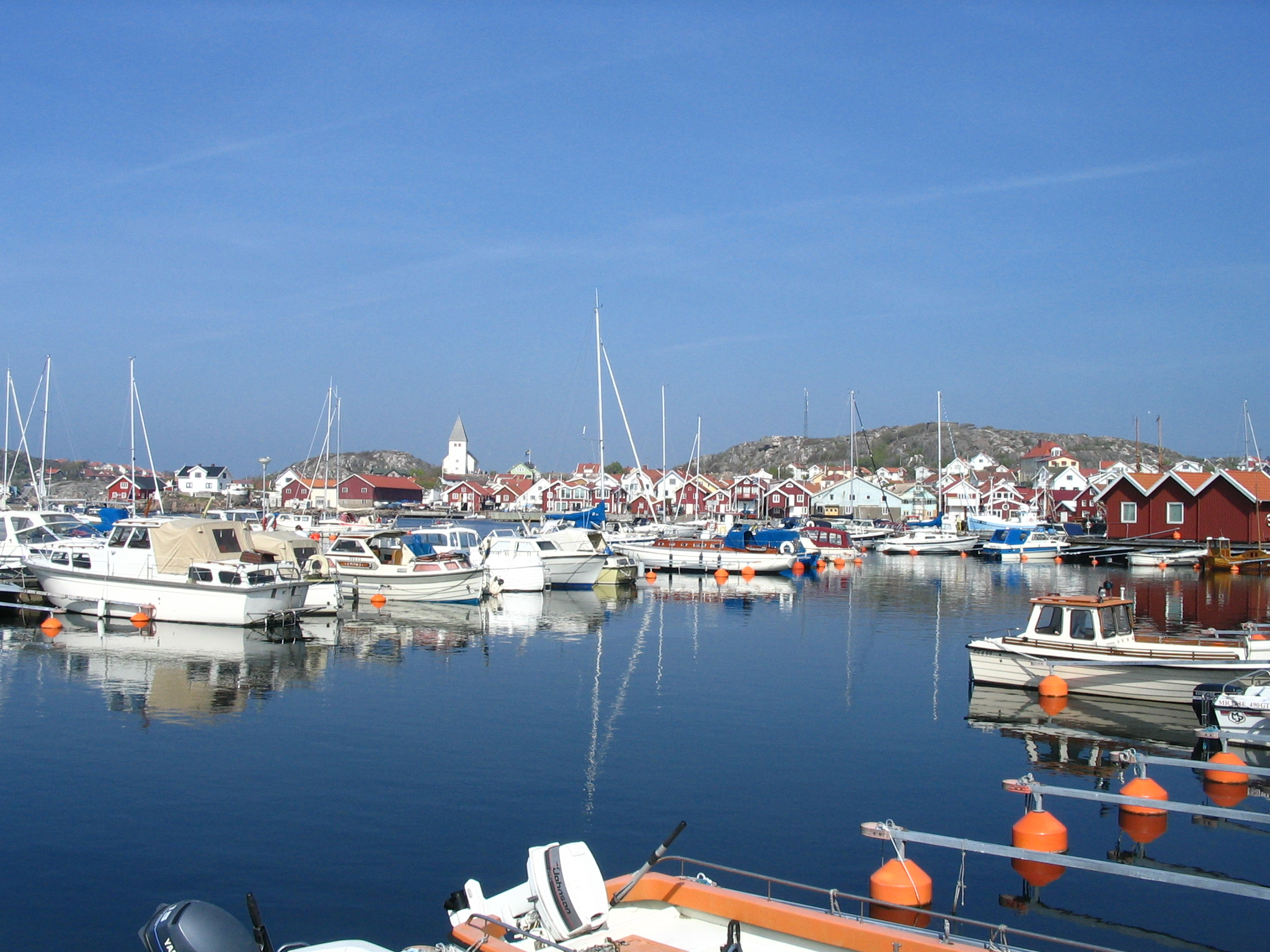
- Skärhamn in May 2007

- Location within Västra Götaland Location within Sweden
- Coordinates: 58°00′N 011°33′E
- Country: Sweden
- Province: Bohuslän
- County: Västra Götaland County
- Municipality: Tjörn Municipality

Area
  - Total: 2.46 km^{2} (0.95 sq mi)

Population (31 December 2010)
  - Total: 3,193
  - Density: 1,295/km^{2} (3,350/sq mi)
- Time zone: UTC+1 (CET)
  - Summer (DST): UTC+2 (CEST)

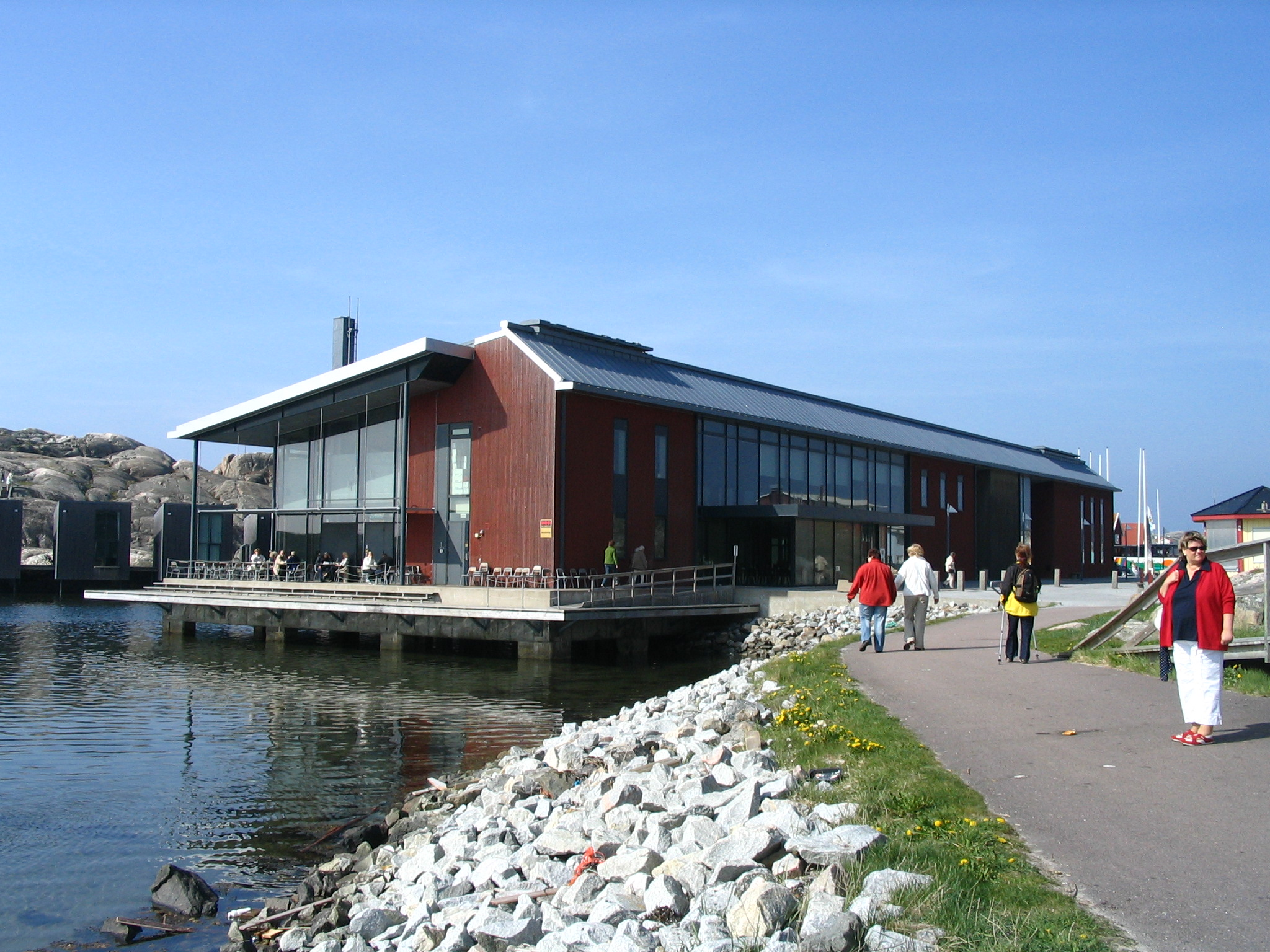
Nordic Watercolour Museum

Skärhamn is a locality and the seat of Tjörn Municipality, Västra Götaland County, Sweden with 3,193 inhabitants in 2010. The main tourist attraction in Skärhamn besides yachting is The Nordic Watercolour Museum (Akvarellmuseet).

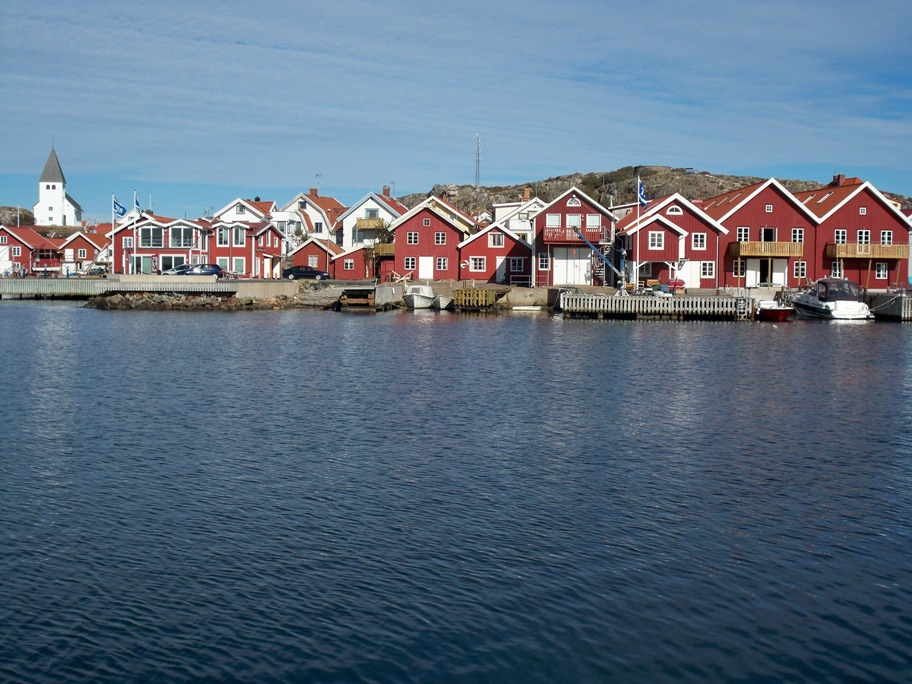
View of Skärhamn

== Sports ==
The following sports clubs are located in Skärhamn:

- Skärhamns IK
