= Skiljebo SK =

Swedish football club

- Full name: Skiljebo Sportklubb
- Founded: 1944
- Ground: Hamre IP; Västerås; Sweden
- Capacity: 1,500
- Chairman: Mona Tapper
- League: Division 2 Norra Svealand
- 2019: Division 2 Norra Svealand, 10th
Home colours

Skiljebo SK is a Swedish football club located in Västerås.

== Background ==
Since their foundation on 4 March 1944 Skiljebo SK has participated mainly in the middle and lower divisions of the Swedish football league system. The club currently plays in Division 2 Norra Svealand which is the fourth tier of Swedish football. They play their home matches at the Hamre IP in Västerås.

Skiljebo SK are affiliated to the Västmanlands Fotbollförbund.

Skiljebo SK has the largest youth activity programme in the province of Västmanland. The club is the organiser of the ArosCup, an international youth football cup played on grass. The tournament was first held 1978. Over 400 teams participate annually, which means that over 7,500 youngsters competing on over 50 pitches.

== Season to season ==
Season	Level	Division	Section	Position	Movements
1993	Tier 3	Division 2	Västra Svealand	9th	
1994	Tier 3	Division 2	Västra Svealand	11th	Relegated
1995	Tier 4	Division 3	Västra Svealand	6th	
1996	Tier 4	Division 3	Östra Svealand	2nd	Promotion Playoffs – Promoted
1997	Tier 4	Division 3	Västra Svealand	11th	Relegated
1998	Tier 5	Division 4	Västmanland	2nd	Promotion Playoffs – Promoted
1999	Tier 4	Division 3	Västra Svealand	3rd	
2000	Tier 4	Division 3	Norra Svealand	3rd	
2001	Tier 4	Division 3	Norra Svealand	2nd	Promotion Playoffs – Promoted
2002	Tier 3	Division 2	Östra Svealand	8th	
2003	Tier 3	Division 2	Västra Svealand	9th	
2004	Tier 3	Division 2	Västra Svealand	5th	
2005	Tier 3	Division 2	Norra Svealand	7th	
2006*	Tier 4	Division 2	Norra Svealand	1st	Promoted
2007	Tier 3	Division 1	Norra	13th	Relegated
2008	Tier 4	Division 2	Norra Svealand	2nd	
2009	Tier 4	Division 2	Norra Svealand	2nd	
2010	Tier 4	Division 2	Norra Svealand	7th	
2011	Tier 4	Division 2	Norra Svealand	4th	
2012	Tier 4	Division 2	Norra Svealand	8th	
2013	Tier 4	Division 2	Norra Svealand	10th	
2014	Tier 4	Division 2	Norra Svealand	8th	
2015	Tier 4	Division 2	Norra Svealand	7th	
2016	Tier 4	Division 2	Norra Svealand	6th	
2017	Tier 4	Division 2	Norra Svealand	3rd	
2018	Tier 4	Division 2	Norra Svealand	6th	
2019	Tier 4	Division 2	Norra Svealand		
2020	Tier 4	Division 2	Norra Svealand		

* League restructuring in 2006 resulted in a new division being created at Tier 3 and subsequent divisions dropping a level.

== Attendances ==
In recent seasons Skiljebo SK have had the following average attendances:

Season	Average attendance	Division / Section	Level
2016	181	Div 2 Norra Svealand	Tier 4
2017	?	Div 2 Norra Svealand	Tier 4
2018	?	Div 2 Norra Svealand	Tier 4
2019	?	Div 2 Norra Svealand	Tier 4
2020		Div 2 Norra Svealand	Tier 4

* Attendances are provided in the Publikliga sections of the Svenska Fotbollförbundet website.
