= Gröndals IK =

Swedish football club

- Full name: Gröndals Idrottsklubb
- Founded: 1928
- Ground: Aspuddens IP, Gröndal, Stockholm; Sweden
- Chairman: Mikael Ekstedt
- Coach: Pascal Simpson
- League: Division 7
- 2017: Division 6 Stockholm F, 9th Excluded
Home colours	Away colours

Gröndals IK is a Swedish football club from Gröndal in South Stockholm. Since 2011 they have been playing in Division 6 Stockholm E, the 8th tier in Swedish league football.

== Season to season ==
Season	Level	Division	Section	Position	Movements
1999	Tier 5	Division 4	Stockholm Mellersta	9th	
2000	Tier 5	Division 4	Stockholm Mellersta	8th	
2001	Tier 5	Division 4	Stockholm Mellersta	4th	
2002	Tier 5	Division 4	Stockholm Mellersta	3rd	
2003	Tier 5	Division 4	Stockholm Mellersta	1st	Promoted
2004	Tier 4	Division 3	Östra Svealand	7th	
2005	Tier 4	Division 3	Norra Svealand	2nd	Promoted
2006*	Tier 4	Division 2	Östra Svealand	1st	Promoted
2007	Tier 3	Division 1	Norra	10th	
2008	Tier 3	Division 1	Norra	4th	
2009	Tier 3	Division 1	Norra	6th	
2010	Tier 3	Division 1	Norra	8th	Relegated
2011	Tier 8	Division 6	Stockholm E	1st	Promoted
2012	Tier 7	Division 5	Stockholm Södra	2nd	
2013	Tier 7	Division 5	Stockholm Södra	3rd	
2014	Tier 6	Division 4	Stockholm Södra	12th	Relegated
2015	Tier 7	Division 5	Stockholm Mellersta	8th	
2016	Tier 7	Division 5	Stockholm Södra	11th	Relegated
2017	Tier 8	Division 6	Stockholm F	9th	Excluded

* League restructuring in 2006 resulted in a new division being created at Tier 3 and subsequent divisions dropping a level.

== Attendances ==
In recent seasons Gröndals IK have had the following average attendances:

Season	Average attendance	Division / Section	Level
2005	91	Div 3 Norra Svealand	Tier 4
2006	184	Div 2 Östra Svealand	Tier 4
2007	250	Div 1 Norra	Tier 3
2008	223	Div 1 Norra	Tier 3
2009	160	Div 1 Norra	Tier 3
2010	128	Div 1 Norra	Tier 3
2011	Not Available	Div 6 Stockholm E	Tier 8
2012	Not Available	Div 5 Stockholm Södra	Tier 7
2013	48	Div 5 Stockholm Södra	Tier 7
2014	134	Div 4 Stockholm Södra	Tier 6
2015	55	Div 5 Stockholm Mellersta	Tier 7
2016	45	Div 5 Stockholm Södra	Tier 7
2017	48	Div 6 Stockholm F	Tier 8

* Attendances are provided in the Publikliga sections of the Svenska Fotbollförbundet website.
