= Rönnäng =

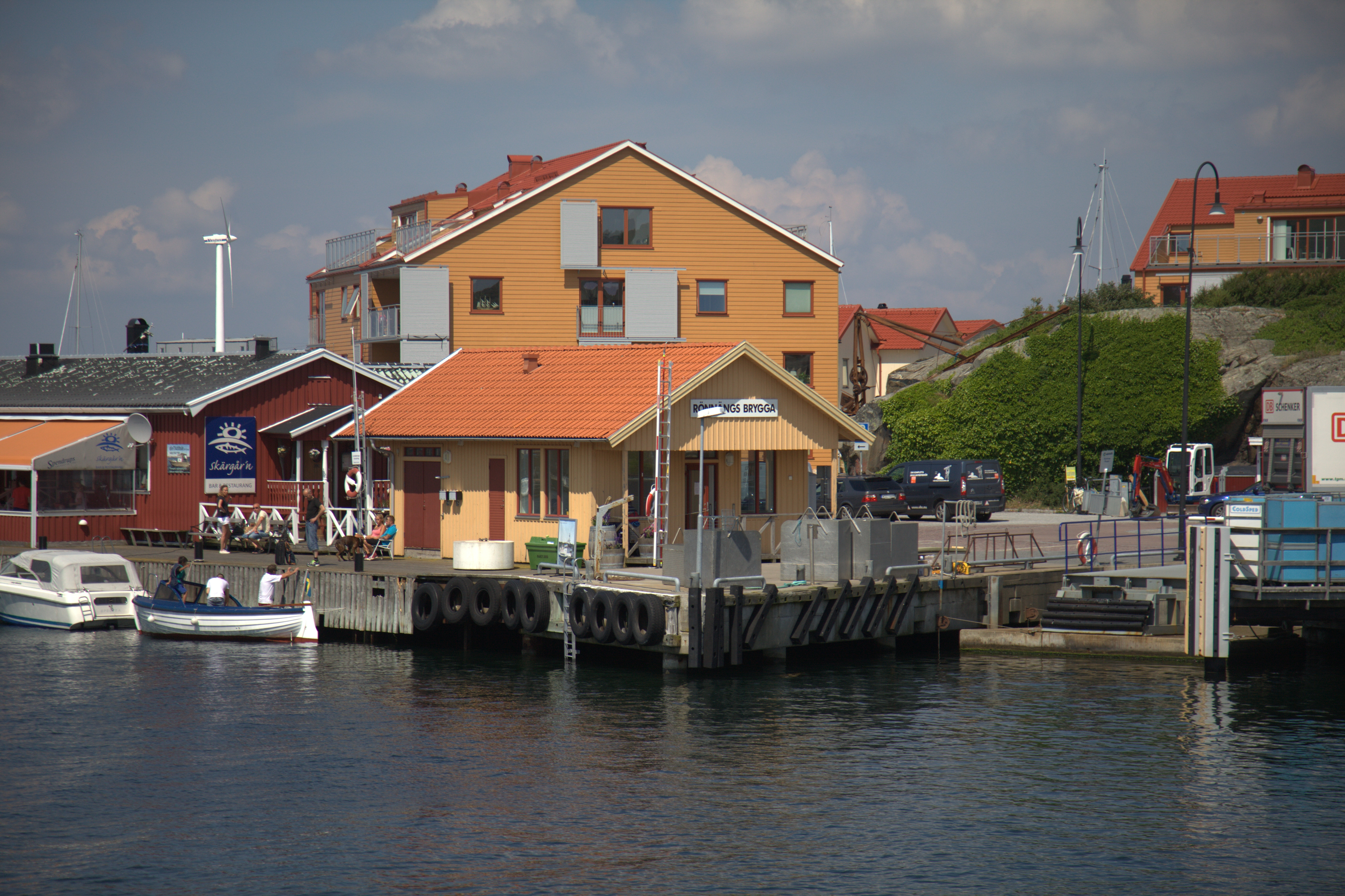
- View of Rönnäng bridge

- Location within Västra Götaland Location within Sweden
- Coordinates: 57°56′N 11°35′E
- Country: Sweden
- Province: Bohuslän
- County: Västra Götaland County
- Municipality: Tjörn Municipality

Area
  - Total: 1.57 km^{2} (0.61 sq mi)

Population (31 December 2010)
  - Total: 1,437
  - Density: 914/km^{2} (2,370/sq mi)
- Time zone: UTC+1 (CET)
  - Summer (DST): UTC+2 (CEST)

Rönnäng is a locality situated in Tjörn Municipality, Västra Götaland County, Sweden with 1,437 inhabitants in 2010. It lies on the south peak of the island Tjörn in Sweden.
