= 2016 Division 1 (Swedish football) =

Division 1
- Season: 2016
- Champions: IF Brommapojkarna (Norra); Östers IF (Södra)
- Promoted: IF Brommapojkarna; Östers IF; Norrby IF
- Relegated: BK Forward; Piteå IF; IK Sleipner; FC Trollhättan; Tvååkers IF; KSF Prespa Birlik; FC Höllviken
- Top goalscorer: Luca Gerbino Polo (25 goals, Norra); Richard Yarsuvat (20 goals, Södra)
- Highest attendance: 4,872; Östers IF 3–0 Qviding FIF (19 August 2016)

The 2016 Division 1, part of the 2016 Swedish football season, is the 11th season of Sweden's third-tier football league in its current format. The 2016 fixtures were released in December 2015. The season started on 16 April 2016 and ended on 6 November 2016.

== Teams ==
28 teams contest the league separated into two divisions, Norra and Södra. 19 returning from the 2015 season, three relegated from Superettan and six promoted from Division 2. The champion of each division will qualify directly for promotion to Superettan, the two runners-up has to play a play-off against the thirteenth and fourteenth team from Superettan to decide who will play in Superettan 2017. The bottom three teams in each division will qualify directly for relegation to Division 2, while the 11th team from each division has to play a play-off against the best runners-up from Division 2 to avoid relegation.

=== Stadia and locations ===
==== Norra ====
Team	Location	Stadium	Stadium capacity^{1}
Akropolis IF	Stockholm	Spånga IP	300
BK Forward	Örebro	Trängens IP	4,700
Carlstad United	Karlstad	Tingvalla IP	10,000
Enskede IK	Stockholm	Enskede IP	1,000
IF Brommapojkarna	Stockholm	Grimsta IP	5,500
IFK Luleå	Luleå	Skogsvallen	7,000
IK Brage	Borlänge	Domnarvsvallen	6,500
IK Sleipner	Norrköping	Nya Parken	17,234
Nyköpings BIS	Nyköping	Rosvalla IP	1,000
Piteå IF	Piteå	LF Arena	6,000
Team TG	Umeå	Tegstunets IP	1,000
Umeå FC	Umeå	T3 Arena	10,000
Vasalunds IF	Stockholm	Skytteholms IP	5,000
Västerås SK	Västerås	Solid Park Arena	7,000

==== Södra ====
Team	Location	Stadium	Stadium capacity^{1}
FC Höllviken	Höllviken	Höllvikens IP	1,900
FC Trollhättan	Trollhättan	Edsborgs IP	5,100
Husqvarna FF	Huskvarna	Vapenvallen	5,000
IK Oddevold	Uddevalla	Rimnersvallen	10,600
Kristianstad FC	Kristianstad	Kristianstads IP	6,000
KSF Prespa Birlik	Malmö	Malmö Stadion	26,500
Landskrona BoIS	Landskrona	Landskrona IP	12,000
Mjällby AIF	Hällevik	Strandvallen	6,750
Norrby IF	Borås	Borås Arena	16,899
Oskarshamns AIK	Oskarshamn	Arena Oskarshamn	2,000
Qviding FIF	Gothenburg	Valhalla IP	4,000
Tvååkers IF	Tvååker	Övrevi IP	1,000
Utsiktens BK	Gothenburg	Ruddalens IP	5,000
Östers IF	Växjö	Myresjöhus Arena	12,000

- ^{1} Correct as of end of 2015 season

== League tables ==
=== Norra ===
Pos	Team	Pld	W	D	L	GF	GA	GD	Pts	Promotion, qualification or relegation
1	IF Brommapojkarna (C, P)	26	19	6	1	59	17	+42	63	Promotion to Superettan
2	Vasalunds IF (Q)	26	18	6	2	59	28	+31	60	Qualification to Promotion playoffs
3	Akropolis IF	26	13	7	6	53	33	+20	46	
4	IK Brage	26	12	3	11	38	33	+5	39	
5	Team TG	26	11	5	10	30	45	−15	38	
6	Västerås SK	26	9	8	9	51	39	+12	35	
7	Nyköpings BIS	26	9	8	9	40	34	+6	35	
8	Umeå FC	26	8	10	8	38	42	−4	34	
9	Enskede IK	26	8	6	12	34	48	−14	30	
10	Carlstad United	26	8	6	12	29	44	−15	30	
11	IFK Luleå (O)	26	7	6	13	32	49	−17	27	Qualification to Relegation playoffs
12	BK Forward (R)	26	8	2	16	35	47	−12	26	Relegation to Division 2
13	Piteå IF (R)	26	6	6	14	38	51	−13	24	Relegation to Division 2
14	IK Sleipner (R)	26	5	3	18	31	57	−26	18	Relegation to Division 2

Source: svenskfotboll.se (in Swedish)
Rules for classification: 1) Points; 2) Goal difference; 3) Number of goals scored; 4) Head-to-head points; 5) Head-to-head goal difference; 6) Head-to-head away goals scored
(C) Champions; (O) Play-off winners; (P) Promoted; (Q) Qualified for the phase indicated; (R) Relegated

=== Södra ===
Pos	Team	Pld	W	D	L	GF	GA	GD	Pts	Promotion, qualification or relegation
1	Östers IF (C, P)	26	18	4	4	45	15	+30	58	Promotion to Superettan
2	Norrby IF (O, P)	26	15	6	5	54	33	+21	51	Qualification to Promotion playoffs
3	Landskrona BoIS	26	14	4	8	50	25	+25	46	
4	Utsiktens BK	26	12	6	8	40	28	+12	42	
5	Kristianstad FC	26	11	4	11	35	35	0	37	
6	Husqvarna FF	26	9	8	9	39	32	+7	35	
7	IK Oddevold	26	8	9	9	39	42	−3	33	
8	Mjällby AIF	26	7	10	9	35	39	−4	31	
9	Qviding FIF	26	8	7	11	27	32	−5	31	
10	Oskarshamns AIK	26	8	6	12	34	46	−12	30	
11	FC Trollhättan (R)	26	6	11	9	29	39	−10	29	Qualification to Relegation playoffs
12	Tvååkers IF (R)	26	6	10	10	30	48	−18	28	Relegation to Division 2
13	KSF Prespa Birlik (R)	26	7	6	13	35	50	−15	27	Relegation to Division 2
14	FC Höllviken (R)	26	4	7	15	23	51	−28	19	Relegation to Division 2

Source: svenskfotboll.se (in Swedish)
Rules for classification: 1) Points; 2) Goal difference; 3) Number of goals scored; 4) Head-to-head points; 5) Head-to-head goal difference; 6) Head-to-head away goals scored
(C) Champions; (O) Play-off winners; (P) Promoted; (R) Relegated

=== Playoffs ===
The 11th-placed teams of each division meets the best two runners-up from 2016 Division 2 in Two-legged ties on a home-and-away basis with the team from Division 1 finishing at home.

9 November 2016
19:00

FC Rosengård 1917	2 – 1	FC Trollhättan
	Report

Malmö IP, Malmö
Attendance: 300
Referee: Granit Maqedonci (Helsingborg)
12 November 2016
14:00

FC Trollhättan	1 – 2	FC Rosengård 1917
	Report

Edsborgs IP, Trollhättan
Attendance: 650
Referee: Fredrik Klitte (Helsingborg)

FC Rosengård 1917 won 4–2 on aggregate.

10 November 2016
00:20

Karlbergs BK	2 – 2	IFK Luleå
	Report

Bosön 2, Lidingö
Attendance: 150
Referee: Andreas Johansson (Huskvarna)
13 November 2016
16:00

IFK Luleå	2 – 0	Karlbergs BK
	Report

Arcushallen, Luleå
Attendance: 1,662
Referee: Farouk Nehdi (Huddinge)

IFK Luleå won 4–2 on aggregate.

== Season statistics ==
=== Norra top scorers ===
Rank	Player	Club	Goals
1	(Italy) Luca Gerbino Polo	Akropolis IF	25
2	(Sweden) Ekin Bulut	Vasalunds IF	13
2	(Ghana) Tetteh Komey	Piteå IF	13
2	(Sweden) Karwan Zarifnejad	Västerås SK	13
5	(Sweden) Erik Björndahl	BK Forward	12
5	(Sweden) Simon Mårtensson	Umeå FC	12
7	(Sweden) Filip Tronét	Västerås SK	11
7	(Sweden) Stefano Vecchia	IF Brommapojkarna	11
9	(Sweden) Kevin Kabran	Vasalunds IF	10
9	(Sweden) Timothy McNeil	Team TG	10

=== Södra top scorers ===
Rank	Player	Club	Goals
1	(Sweden) Richard Yarsuvat	Norrby IF	20
2	(Sweden) Erik Pärsson	Landskrona BoIS	17
3	(Sweden) Arber Hasani	Husqvarna FF	12
3	(Ghana) Karim Sadat	KSF Prespa Birlik	12
5	(Nigeria) Izuchukwu Emeh	Kristianstad FC	11
6	(Sweden) Johan Patriksson	IK Oddevold	10
7	(Sweden) Jakob Adolfsson	Tvååkers IF	9
7	(Sweden) Marcus Ekenberg	Mjällby AIF	9
7	(Ghana) Mamudo Moro	Mjällby AIF	9
