= Foteviken Museum =

Archaeological open-air museum in Vellinge Municipality, Skåne County, Sweden

- Fotevikens Museum
- Established: 1995
- Location: Höllviken, Skåne, Sweden
- Coordinates: 55°25′45.41″N 12°57′11.3″E
- Type: open-air museum
- Website: www.fotevikensmuseum.se/d/en/home

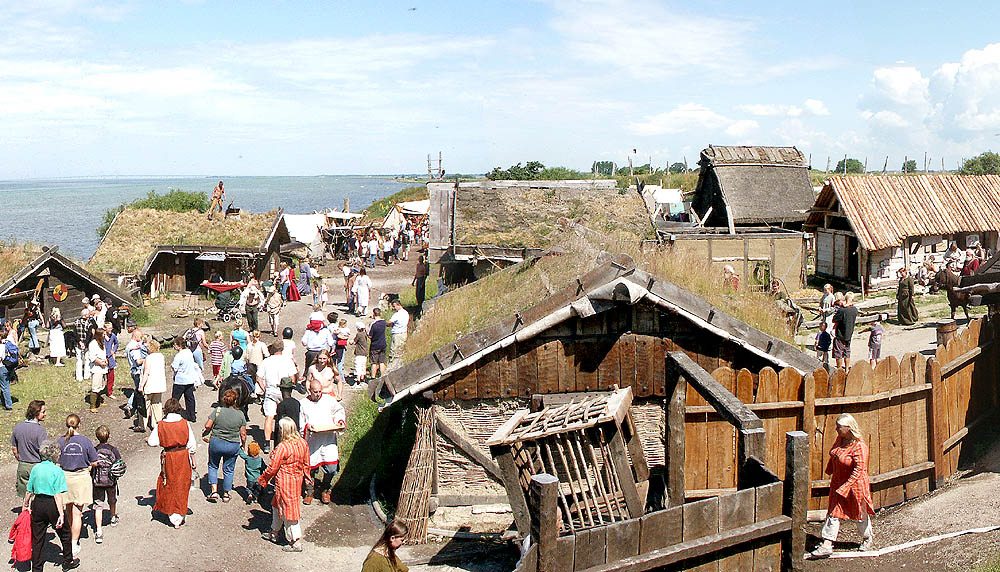
Recreated Viking Age settlement at Foteviken Museum

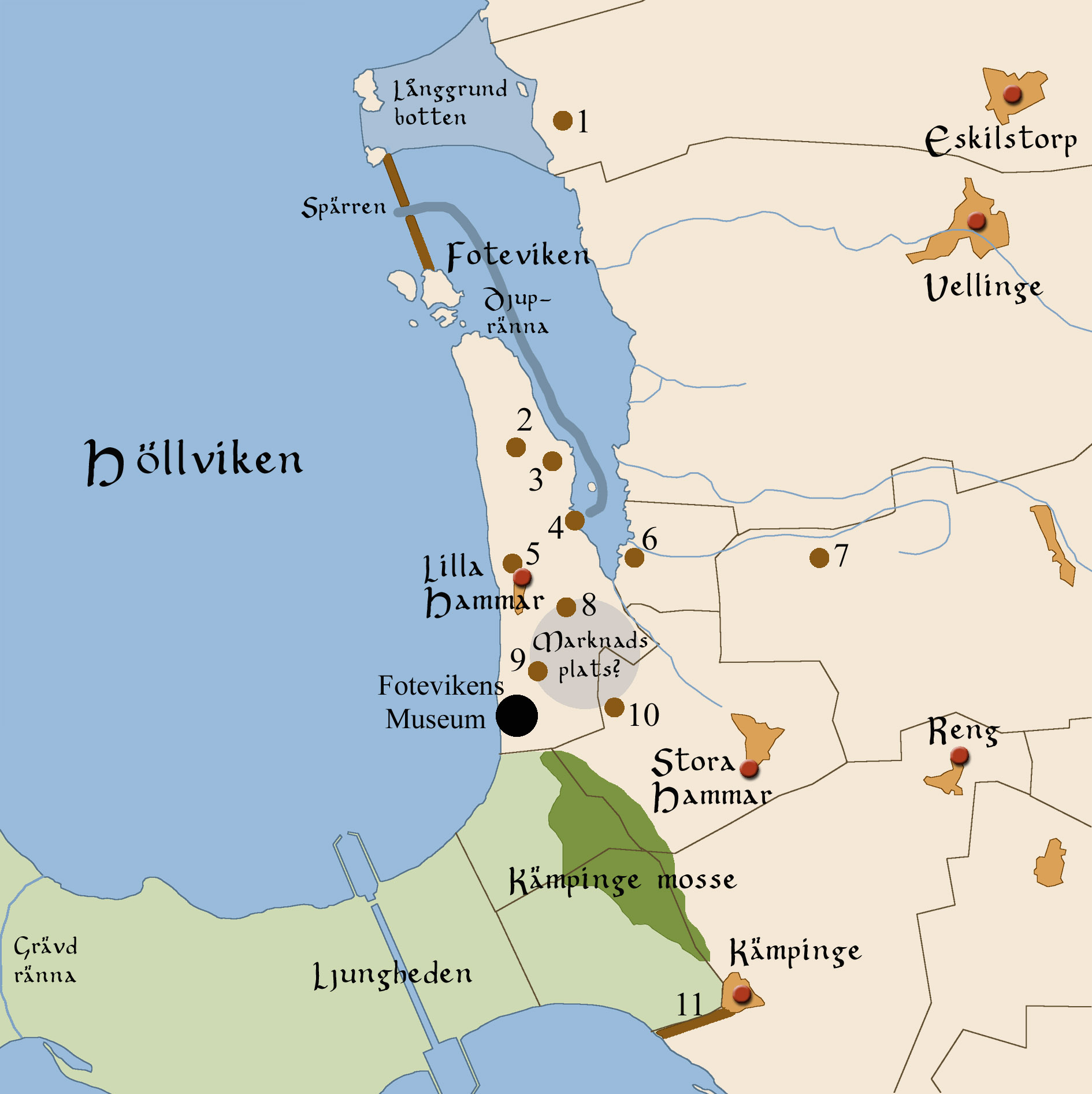
Map of Viking Age sites around the museum

The Foteviken Museum (Swedish: Fotevikens Museum) is an archaeological open-air museum on the Höllviken peninsula in southern Skåne, Sweden. It contains a reconstruction of a large Viking Age settlement and a "viking reservation", and visitors participate in living history reenactments; it also performs research and functions as the municipal museum of Vellinge Municipality and part of Fotevikens Kulturcenter, a group of cultural facilities on the peninsula.

== History ==
The museum grew out of the archaeological investigation of sunken viking ships in Foteviken Bay and local interest in the Battle of Fotevik, which was fought there on 4 June 1134. A group headed by Björn M. Buttler Jakobsen formed a foundation called SVEG (Scandinavian Viking Explorer Group) in 1987. In 1993, the foundation started planning to open a maritime museum; in 1995, after changing their focus towards Viking Age living history, they opened Foteviken Museum, with Jakobsen as its director. At the Cog Museum in Malmö, the group built two replica viking cogs; in 2014 the city sold these and the harbour site where they are located is now a medieval-themed tourist area called Medeltidsriket Malmöya.

== Facilities and programmes ==
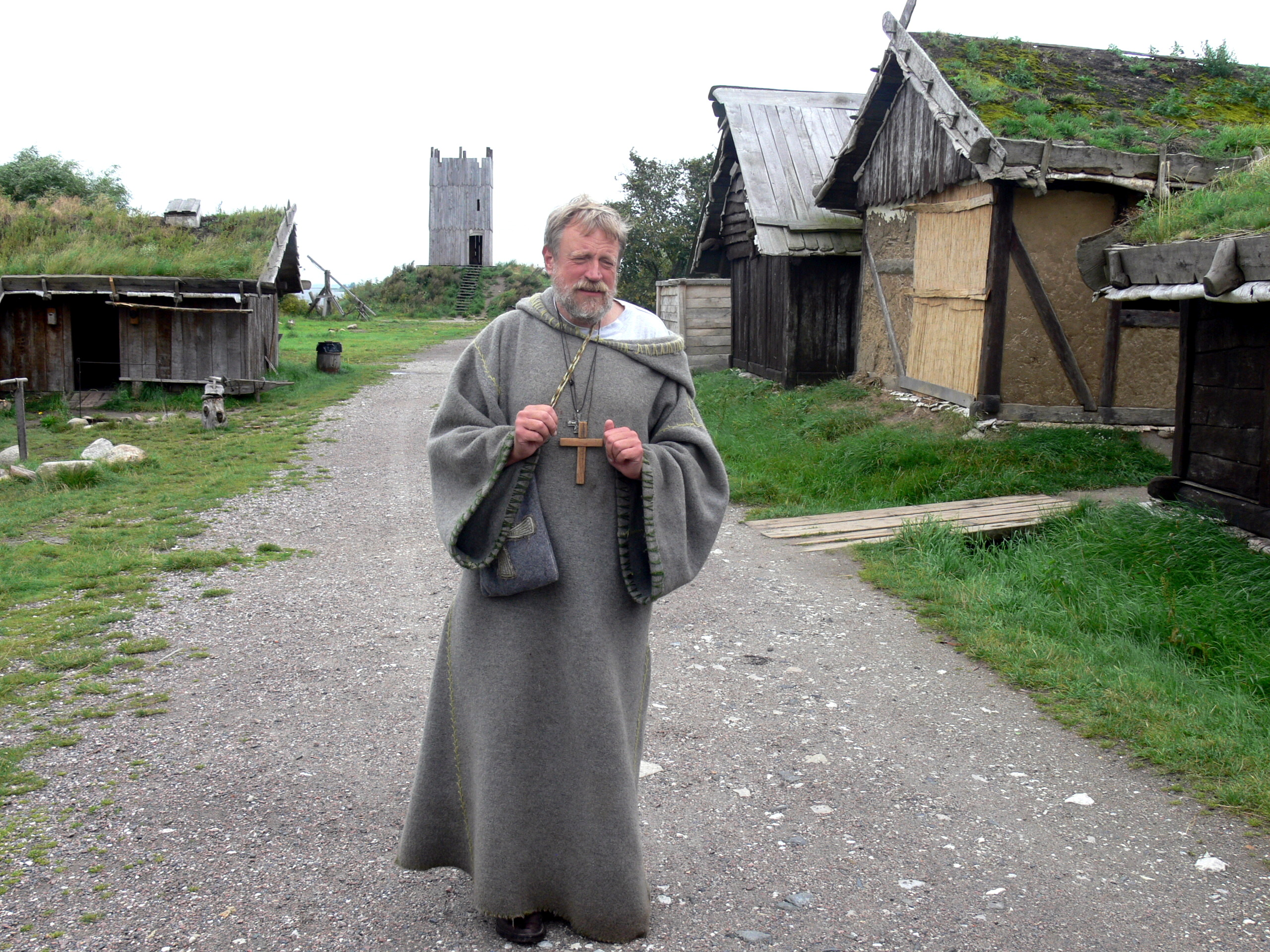
Typical turf houses in Foteviken with lookout castle in the background

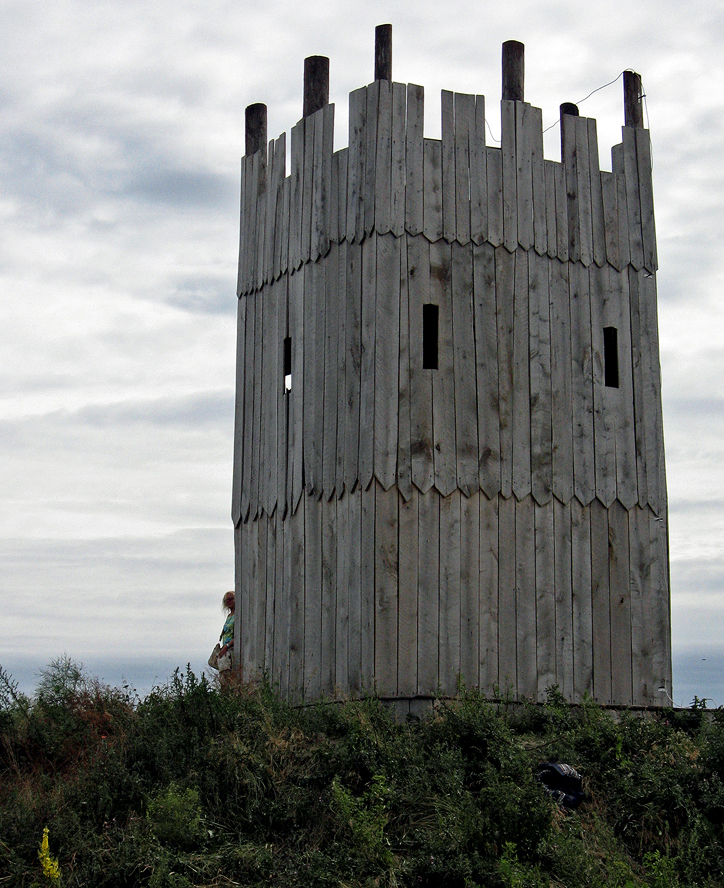
Observation tower at Fotevikens Museum 2007.

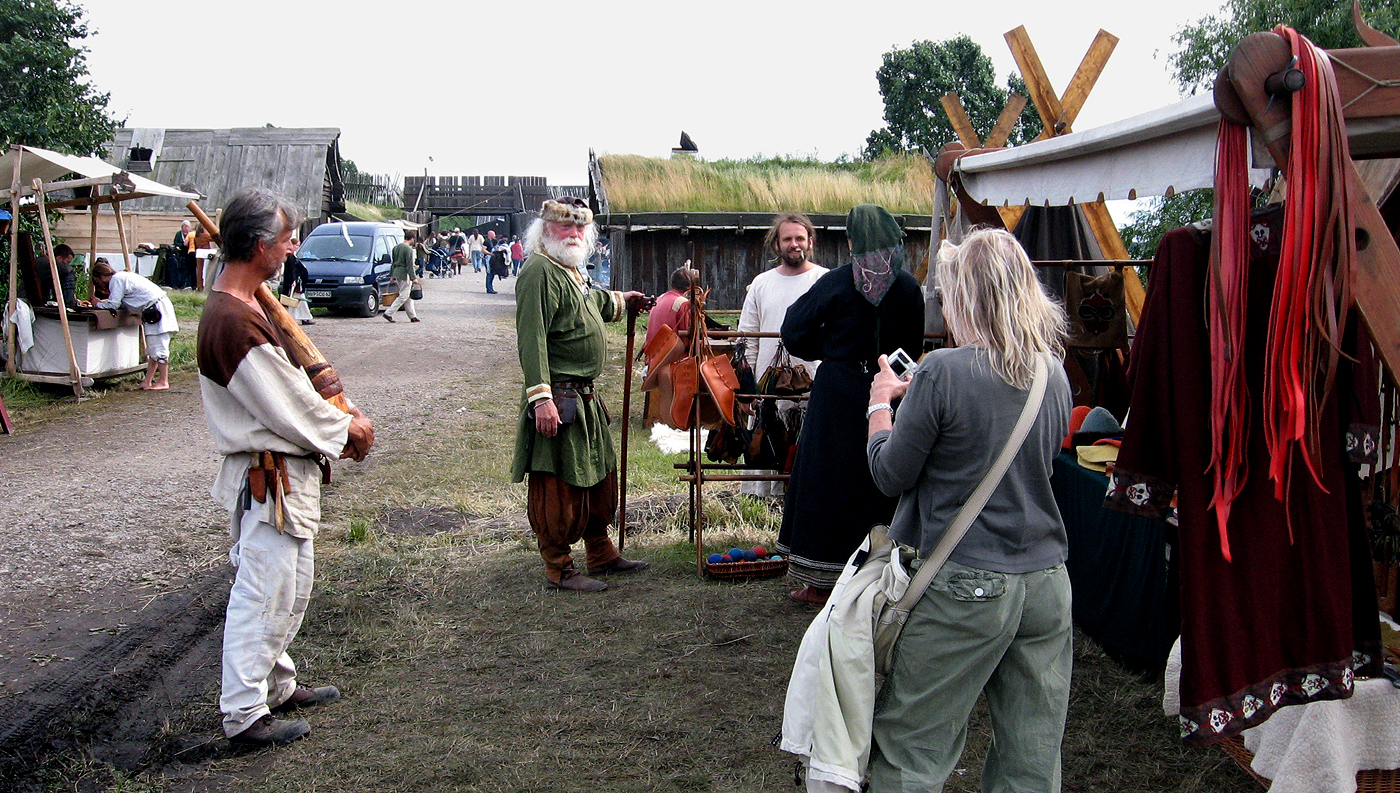
Marketplace at Fotevikens Museum 2007.

The museum occupies an approximately 70,000-square-metre (17-acre) site on Höllviken Bay. In addition to a reconstruction of a large Viking Age settlement, the 'Viking Reserve', there are research and handicrafts buildings and three large halls, including a restaurant seating up to 200 and a feast hall. The gate to the reserve is indicated on the museum map as a "border gate" between Sweden and the reserve. Buildings in the reserve are built or rebuilt by staff and volunteers almost every season, with traditional methods being supplemented by modern technology in winter; as of 2010 there were about 22, including a tapestry-lined chieftain's house and a hof. The reserve opens for the summer season on May Day, and is intended as a recreation of a large settlement late in the Viking Age, during the transition to the Scandinavian Middle Ages and the increasing influence of Christianity in the North. This enables the museum to include the Battle of Fotevik, which clearly belongs to the medieval period. Those staying in the reserve live as Viking Age people and are not permitted to have modern equipment or wear modern clothing. It is marketed as open to "all Vikings" and attracts large numbers of Viking Age reenactors; many of the visitors are from outside Scandinavia, particularly from Germany. An international viking thing is held in the Tinghöll building every year; according to the museum, in 2001 66 representatives from 22 countries were present.

The museum has a library which is available for research and makes heavy use of electronic media. It offers various educational programmes, including overnight stays; since it is also the municipal museum of Vellinge, these are free to local schools. However, the reserve has no electricity and minimal signage.

=== Seasonal programmes ===
In Midwinter the museum hosts a fire festival. A May Eve bonfire is also lit to reproduce a traditional viking celebration of the return of spring. At these and other events, the director plays the role of 'King Björn'.

Summer activities at the museum climax in Viking Week in late June; this includes craft days and since 1997 a viking market. At the market in summer 2016, five actors in a group who travel between Viking Age reenactment sites, the Nordic International Slave Trade Company, reportedly threw a bag over a tourist's head and auctioned her off as a thrall. The police have said they will be speaking to people at the museum about treatment of members of the public.

== Gallery ==
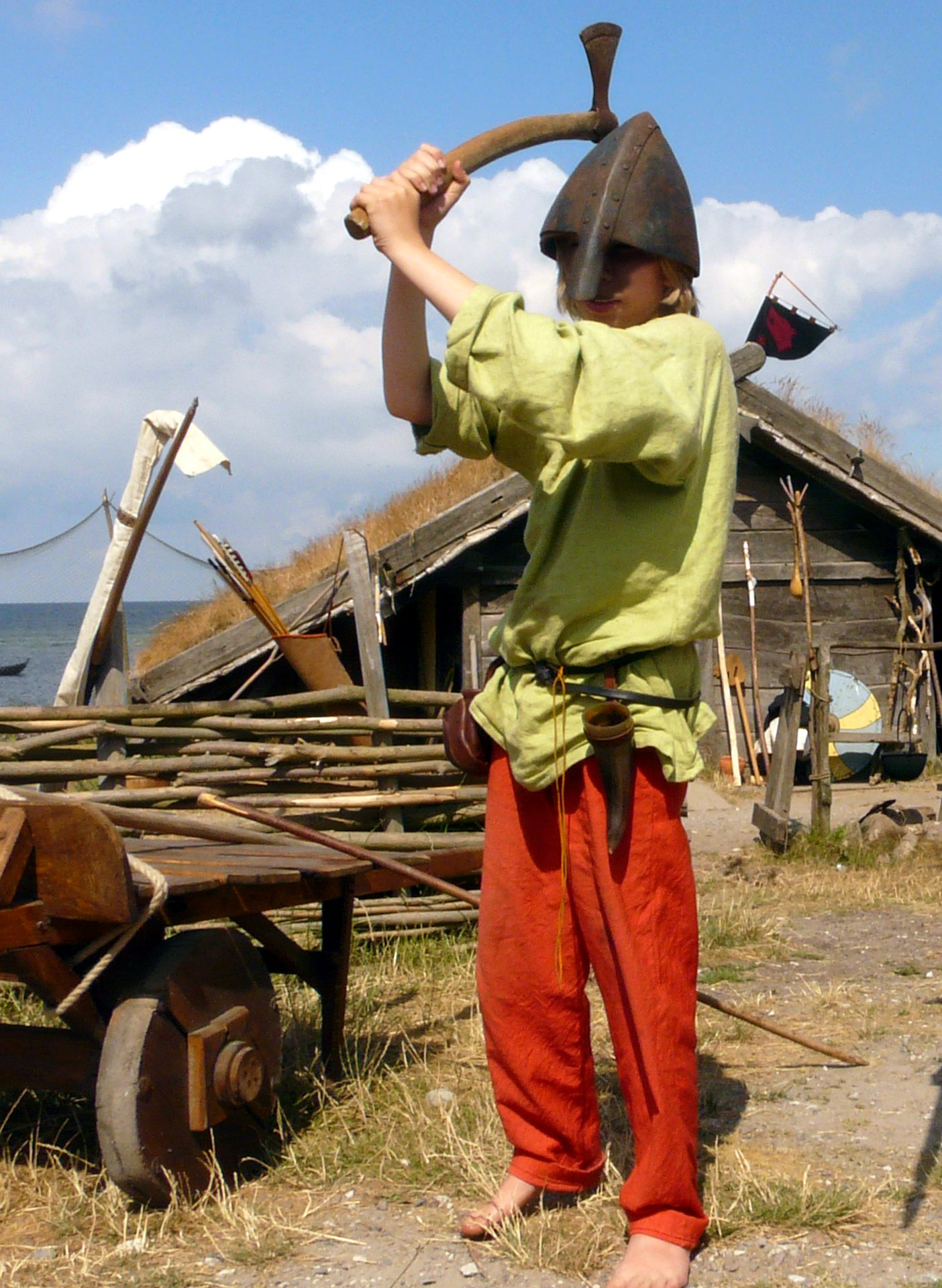
Young "Viking" in "Vikingareservat Foteviken"

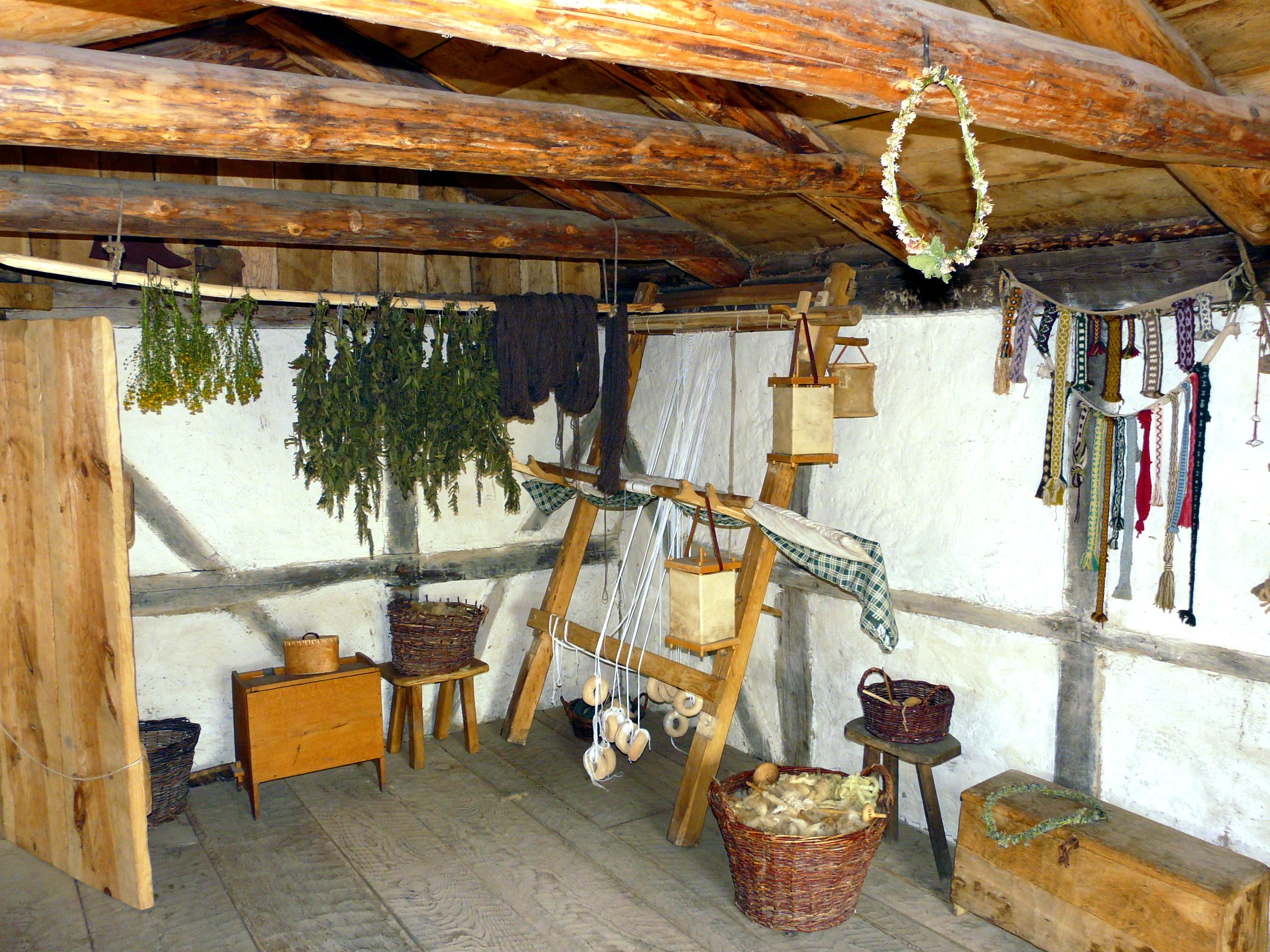
Interior of one of the houses

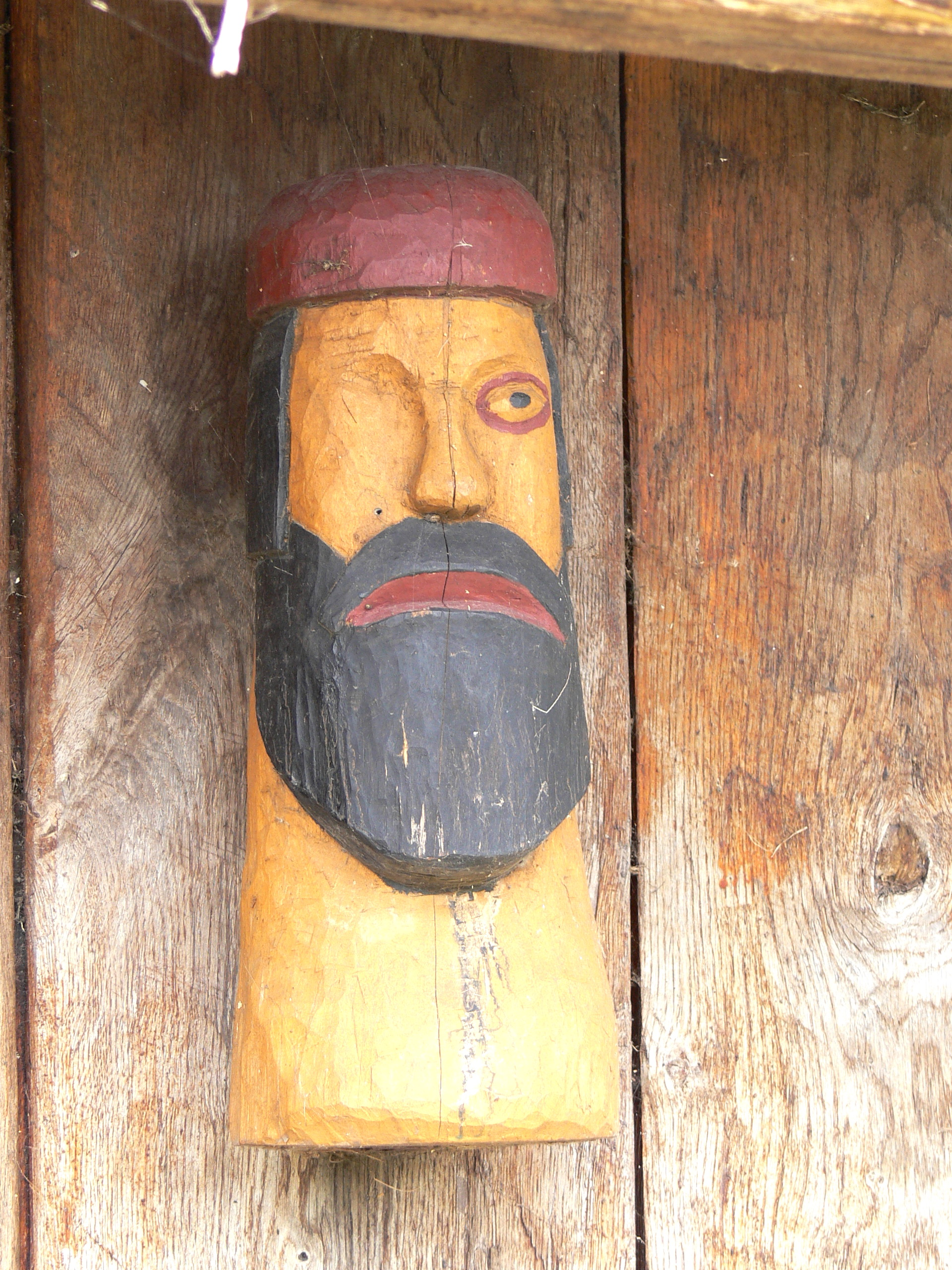
Sculpture of God Wotan, attached at the outside of reconstructed Viking house

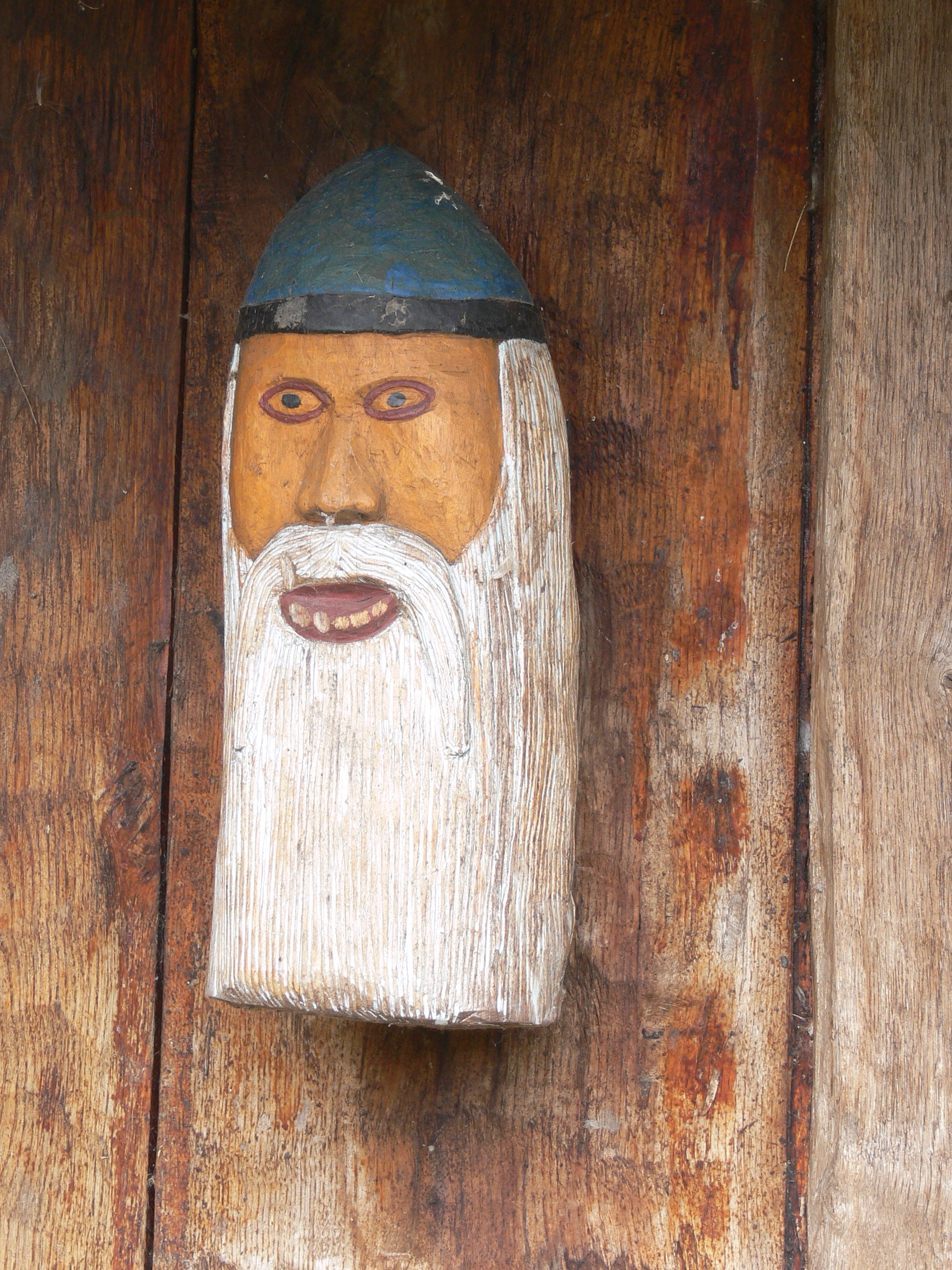
Sculpture of Ægir, in Skanör.

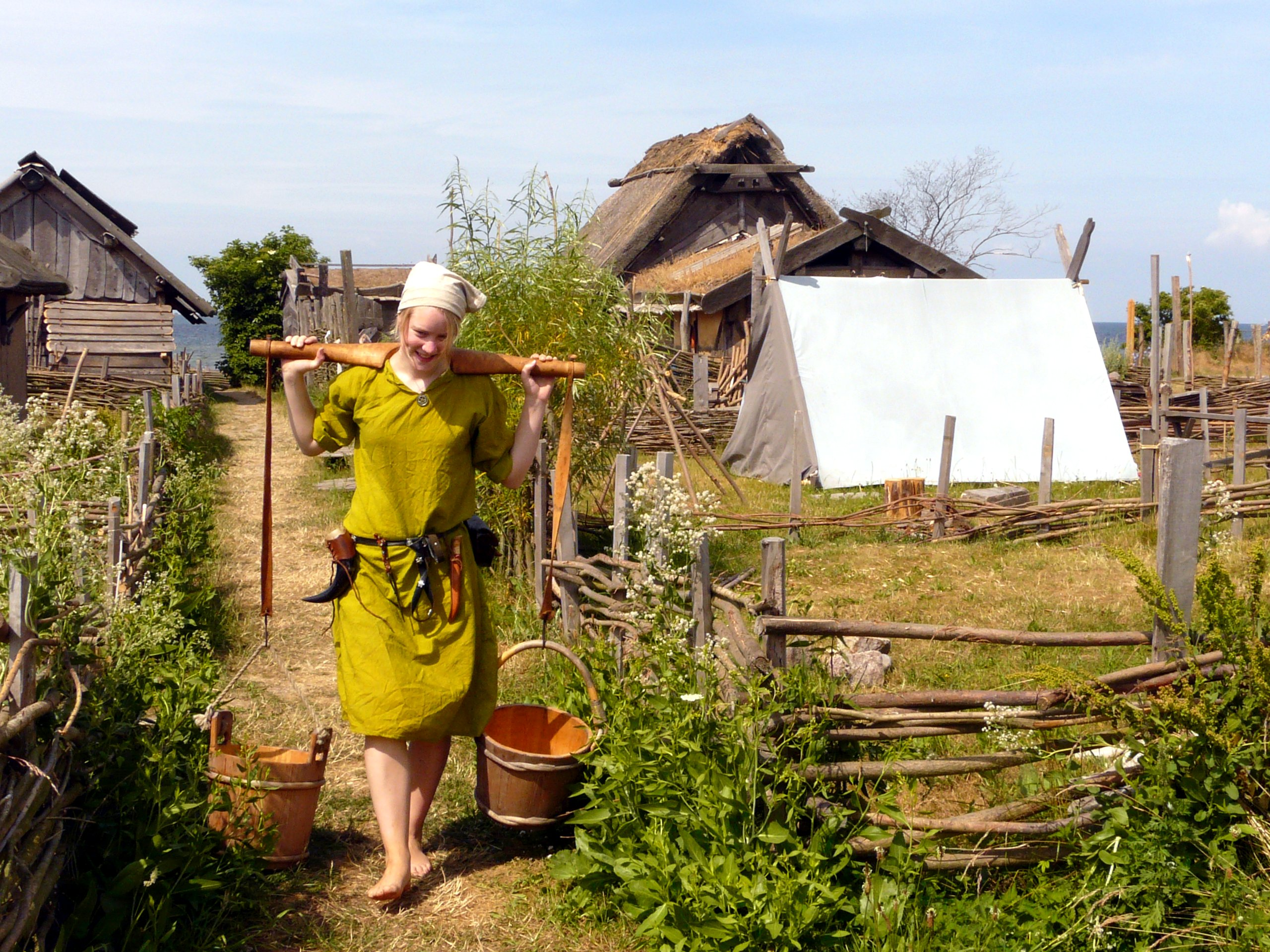

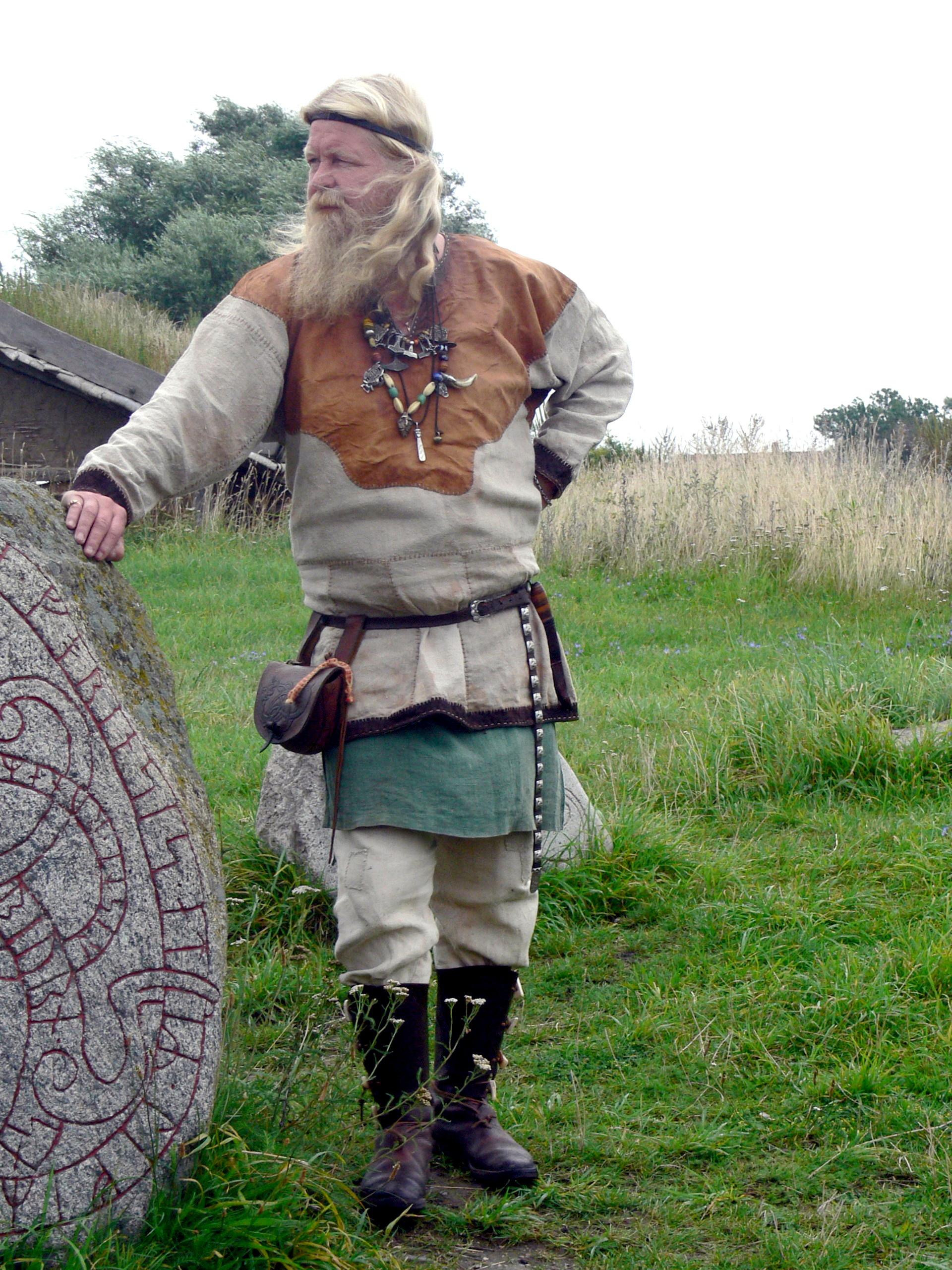

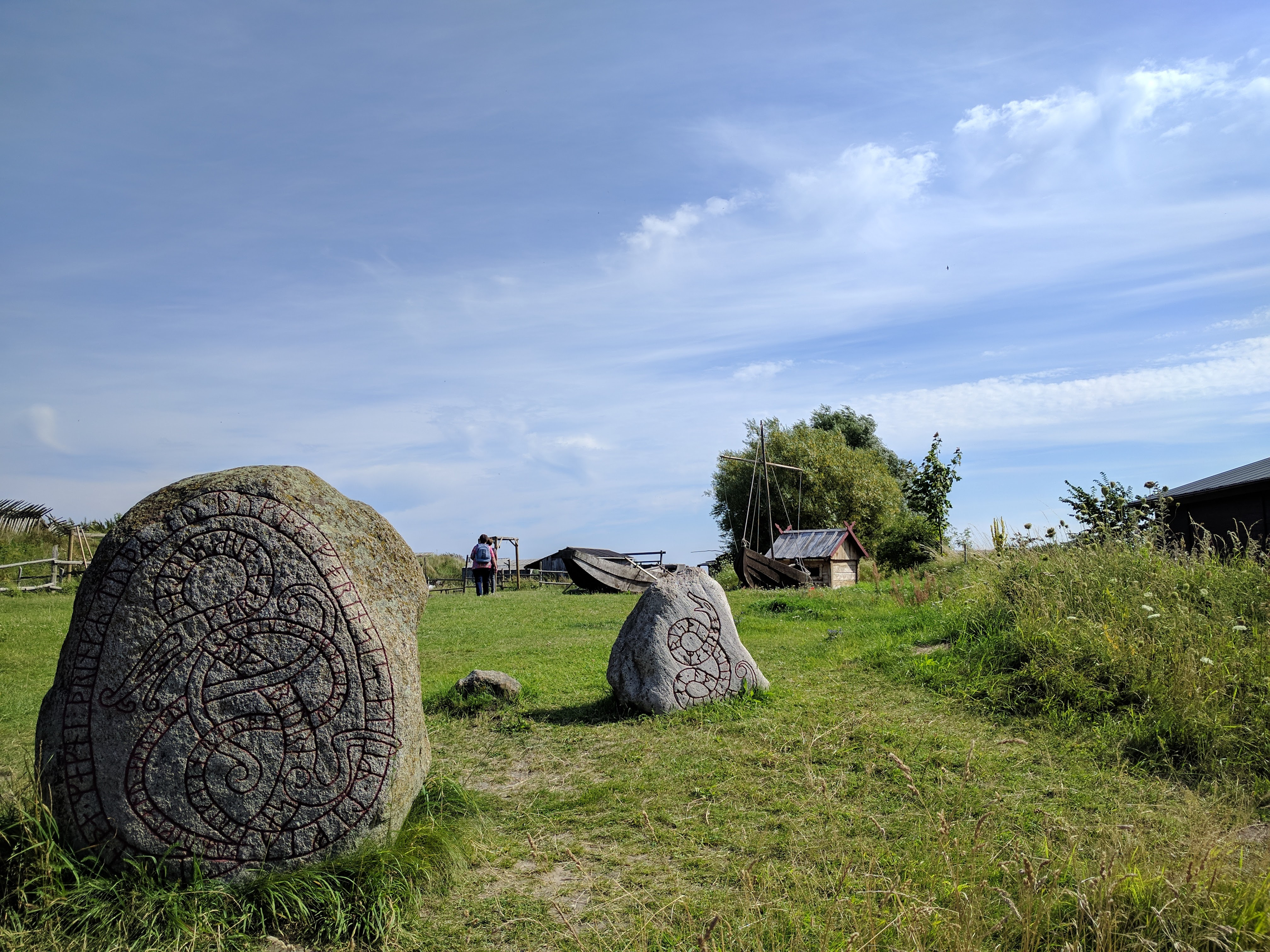

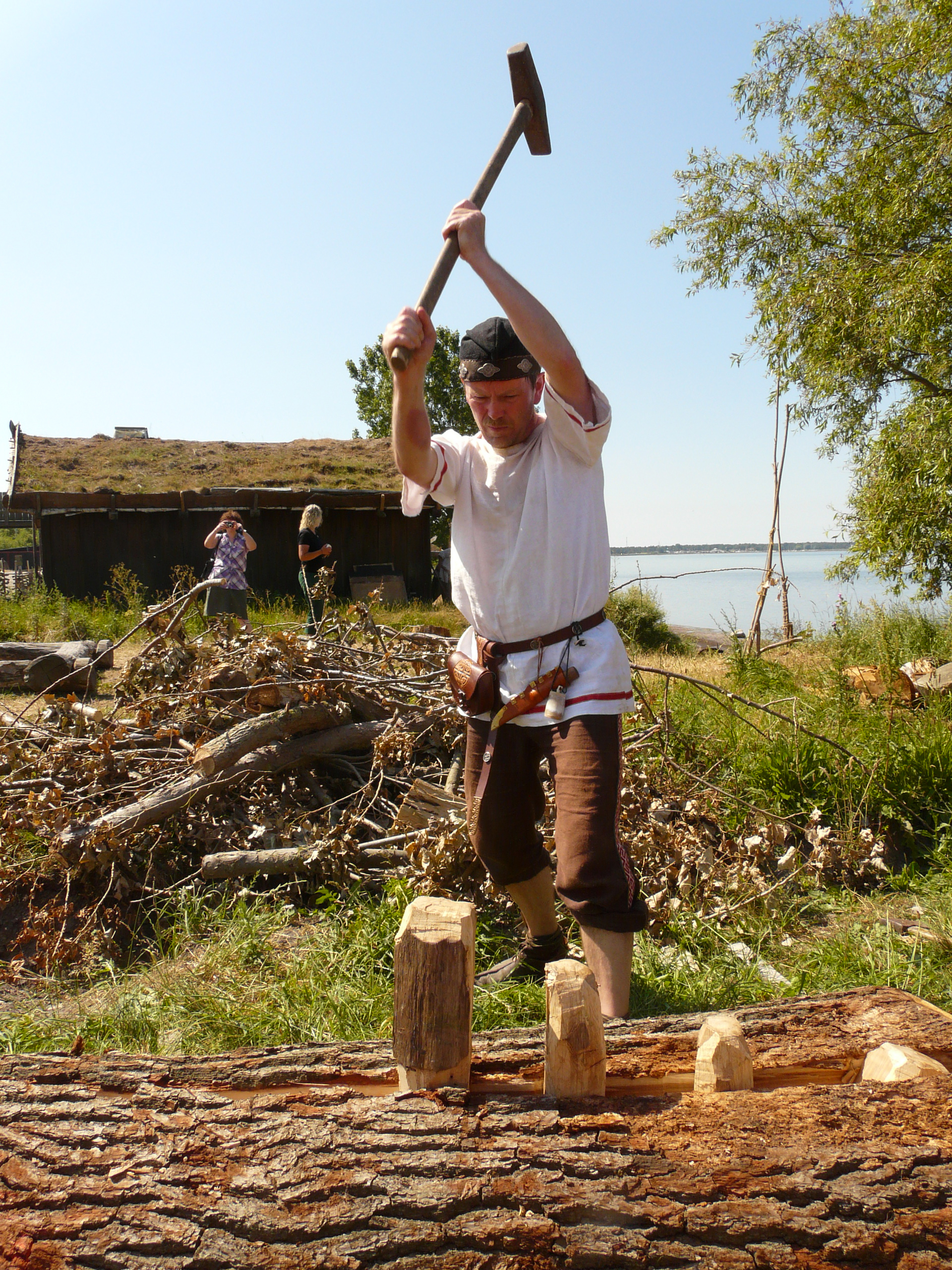

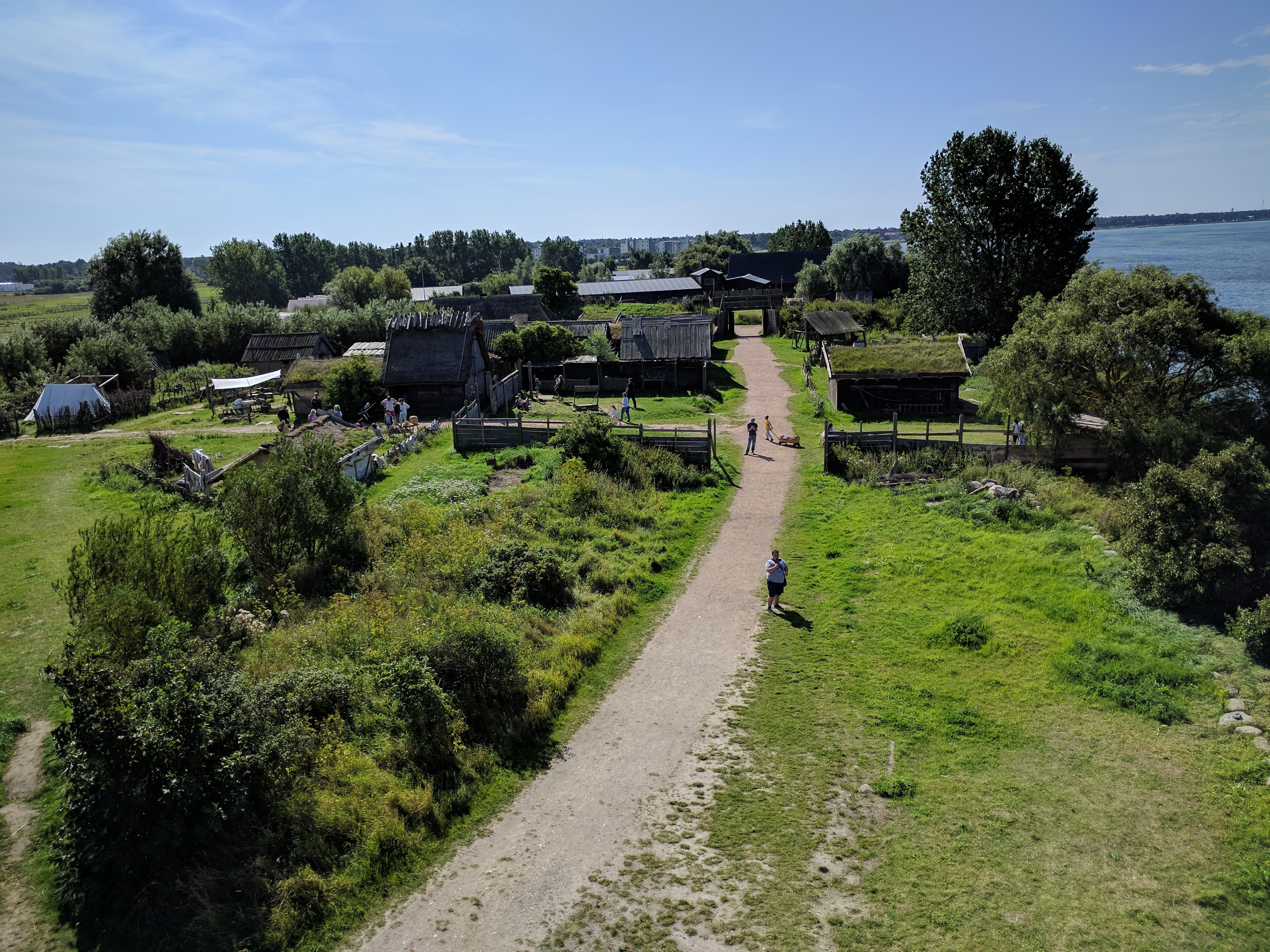

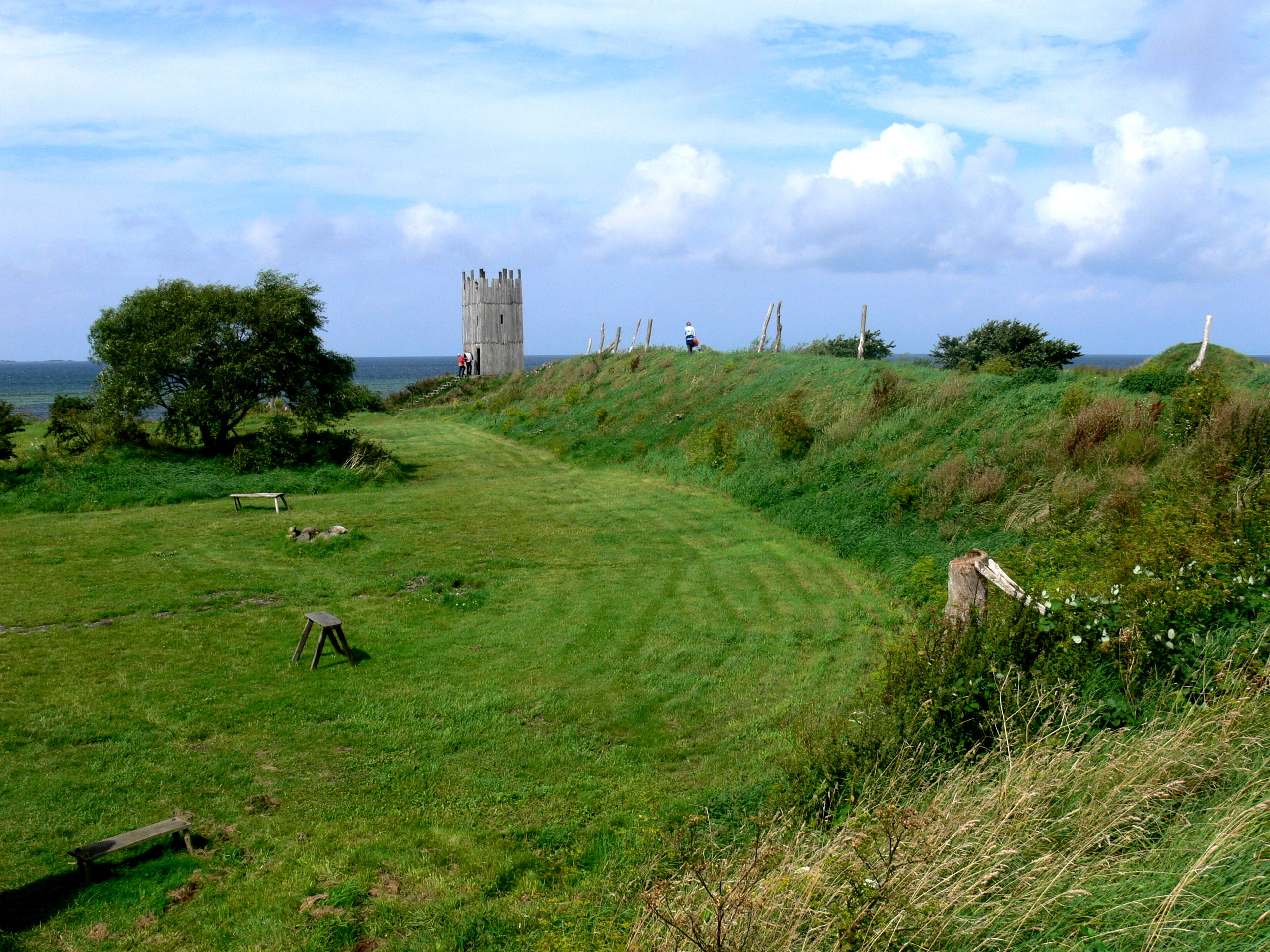

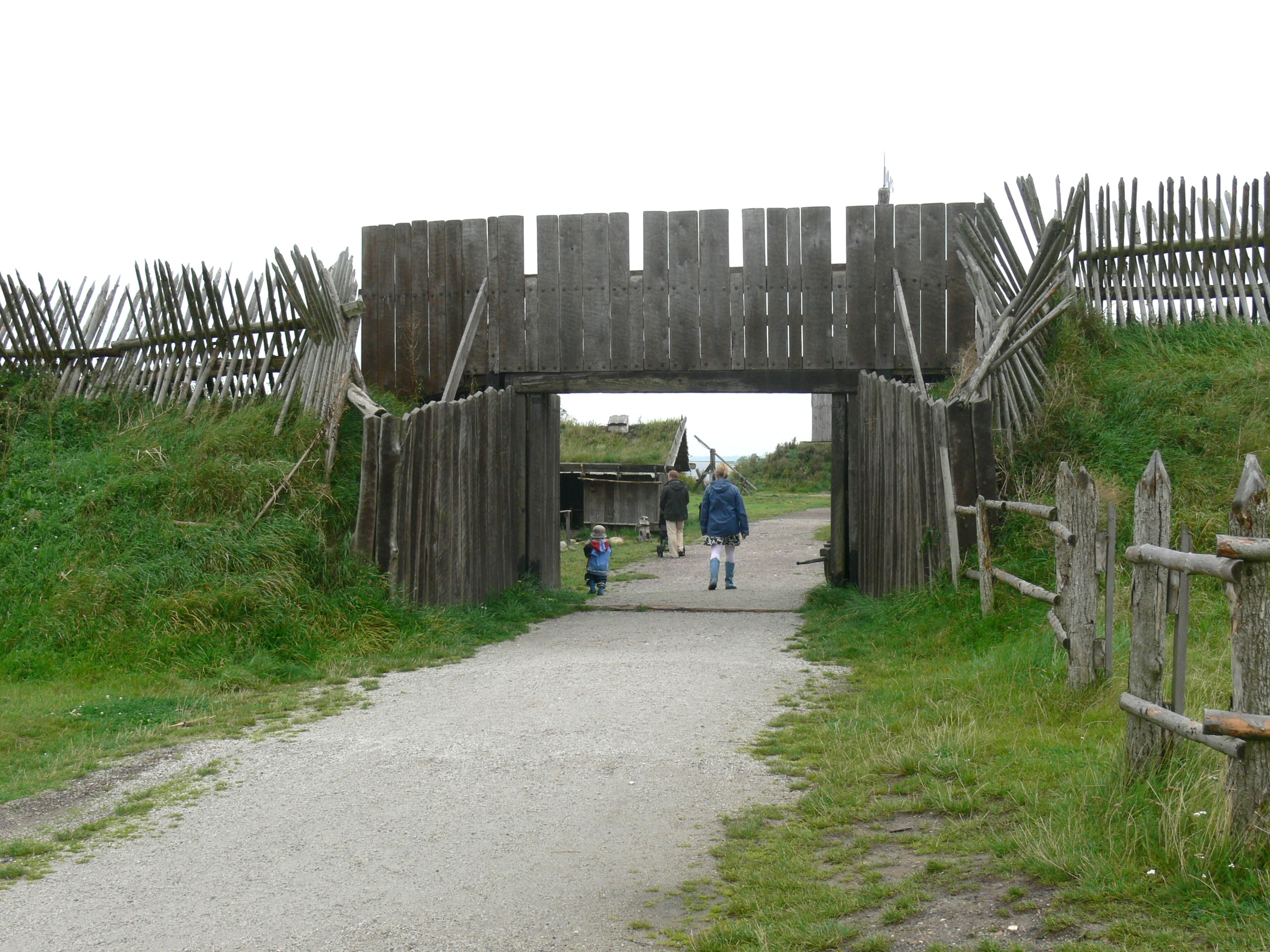

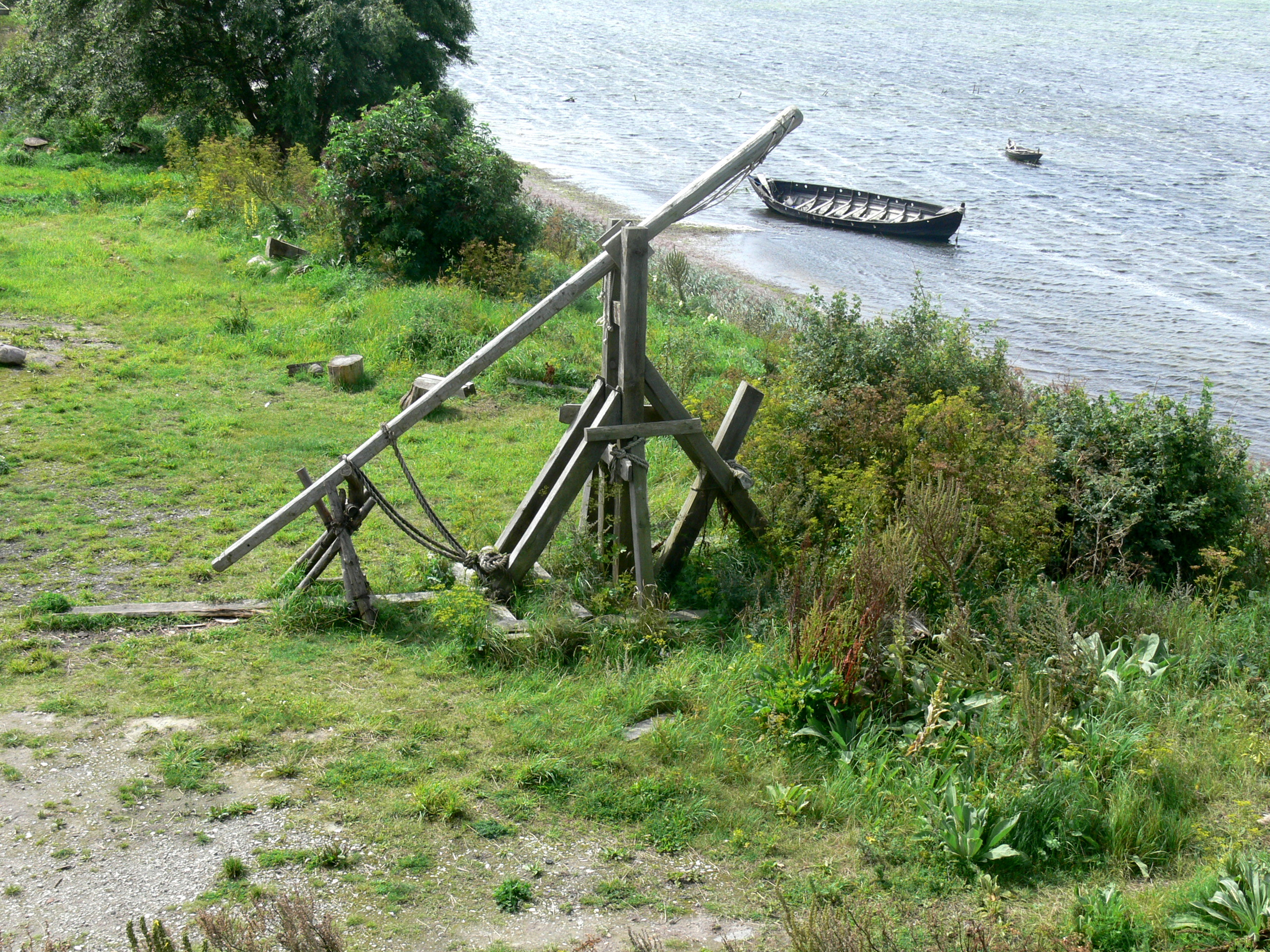

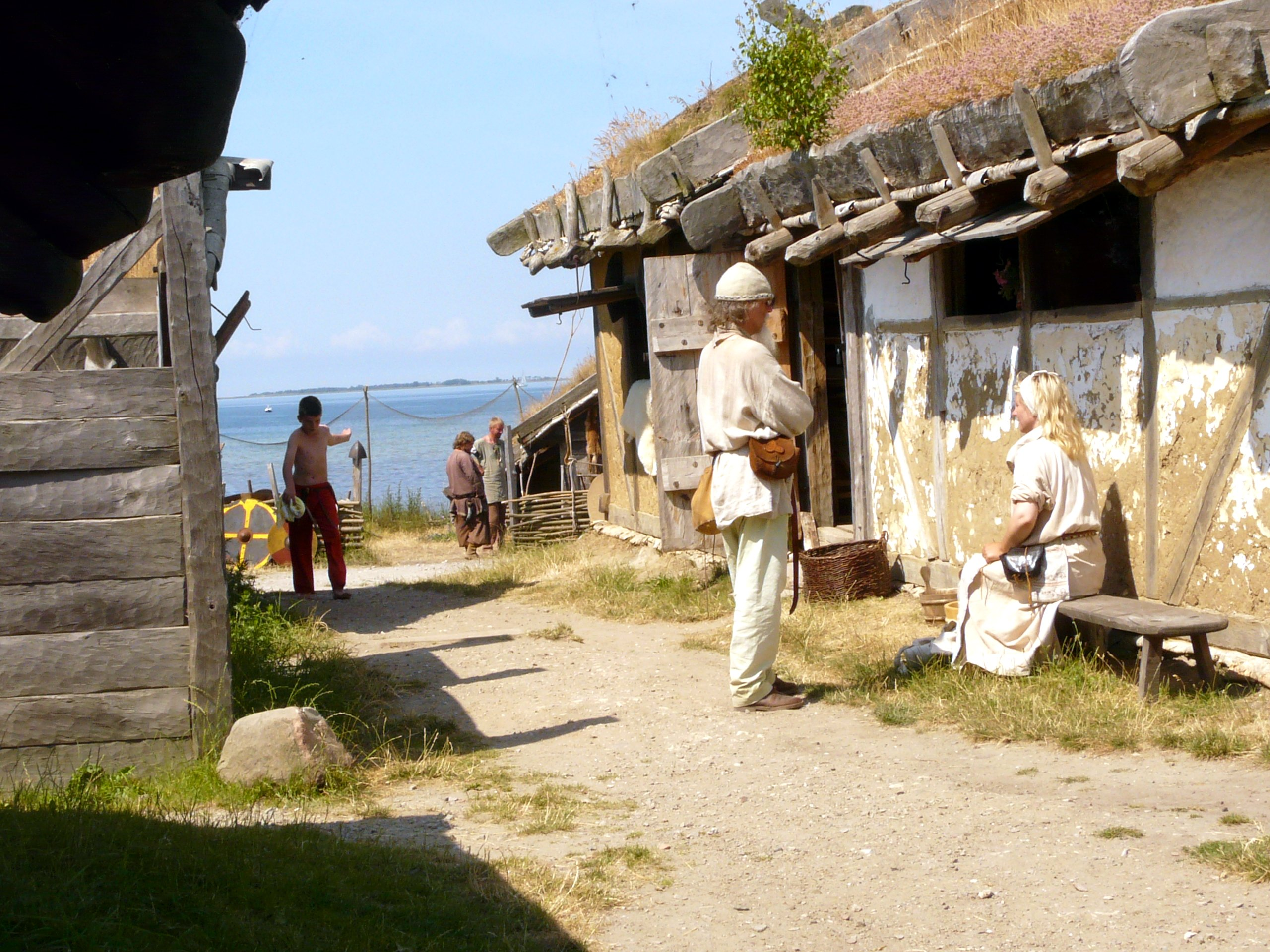

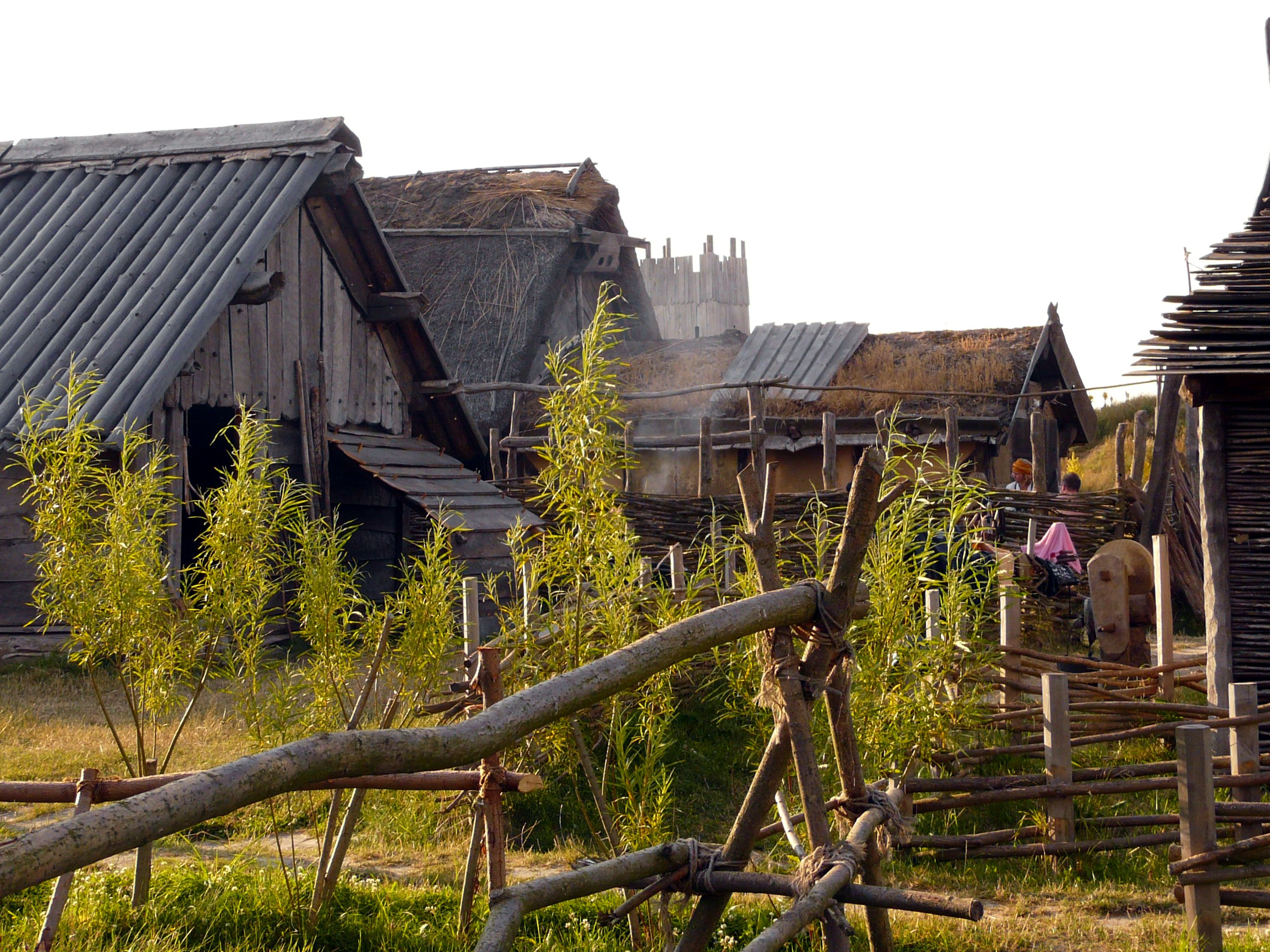

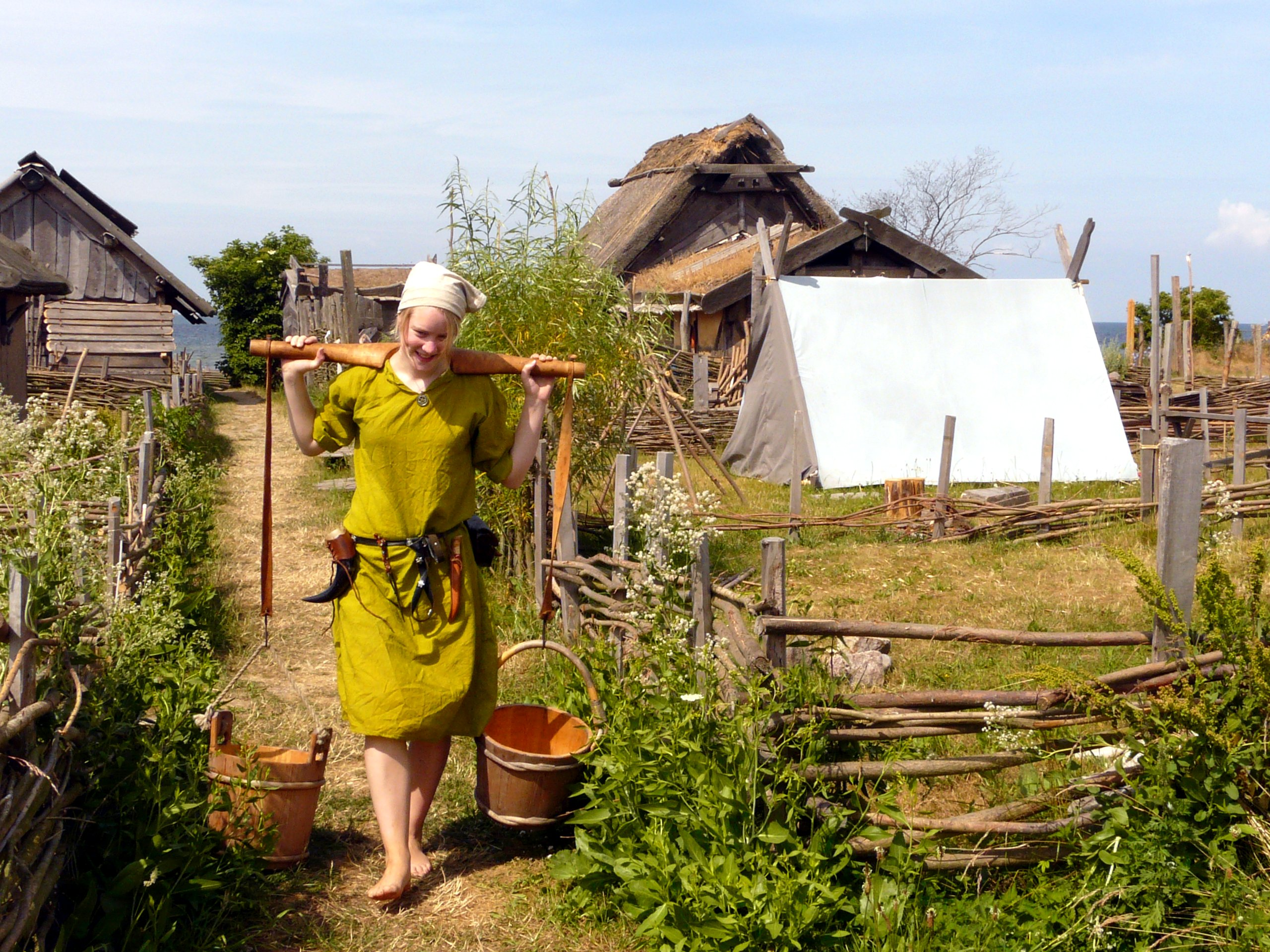
Fetching water in the viking village.

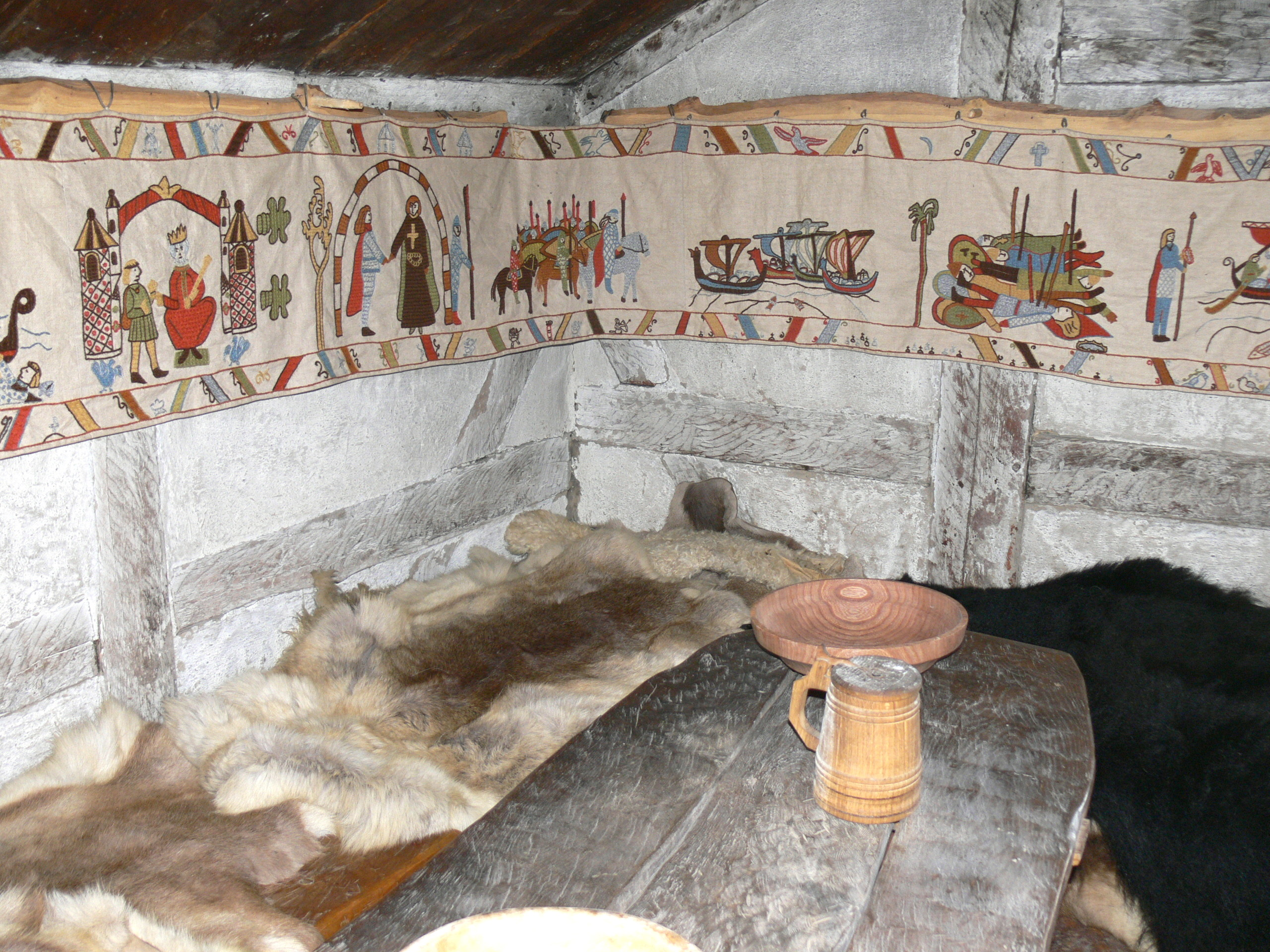
Wall tapestry in a house in the viking village.

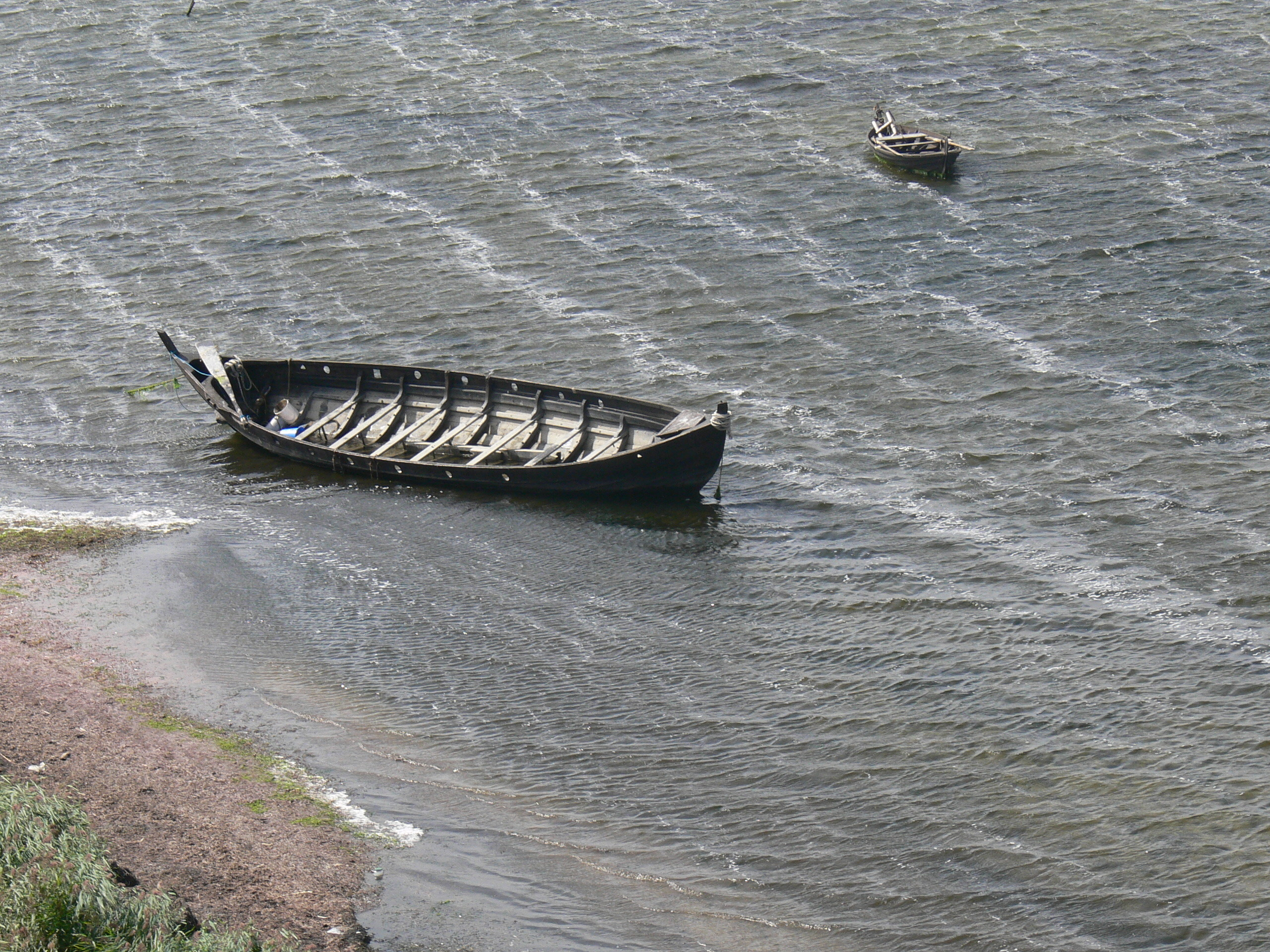
Viking Museum Foteviken in Skanör. Viking boats in the water in front of the settlement

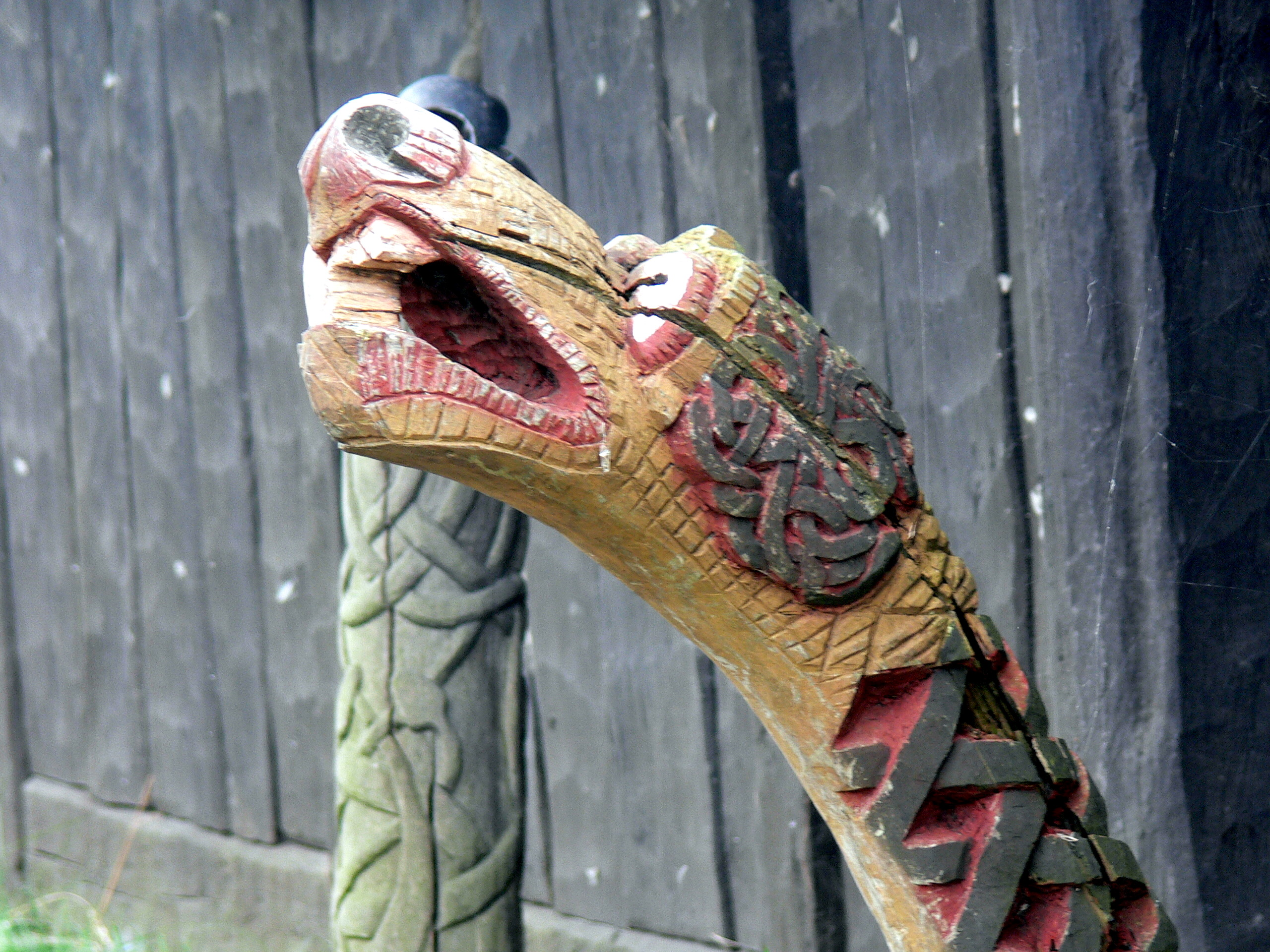
Viking Museum Foteviken in Skanör. Carved dragon head

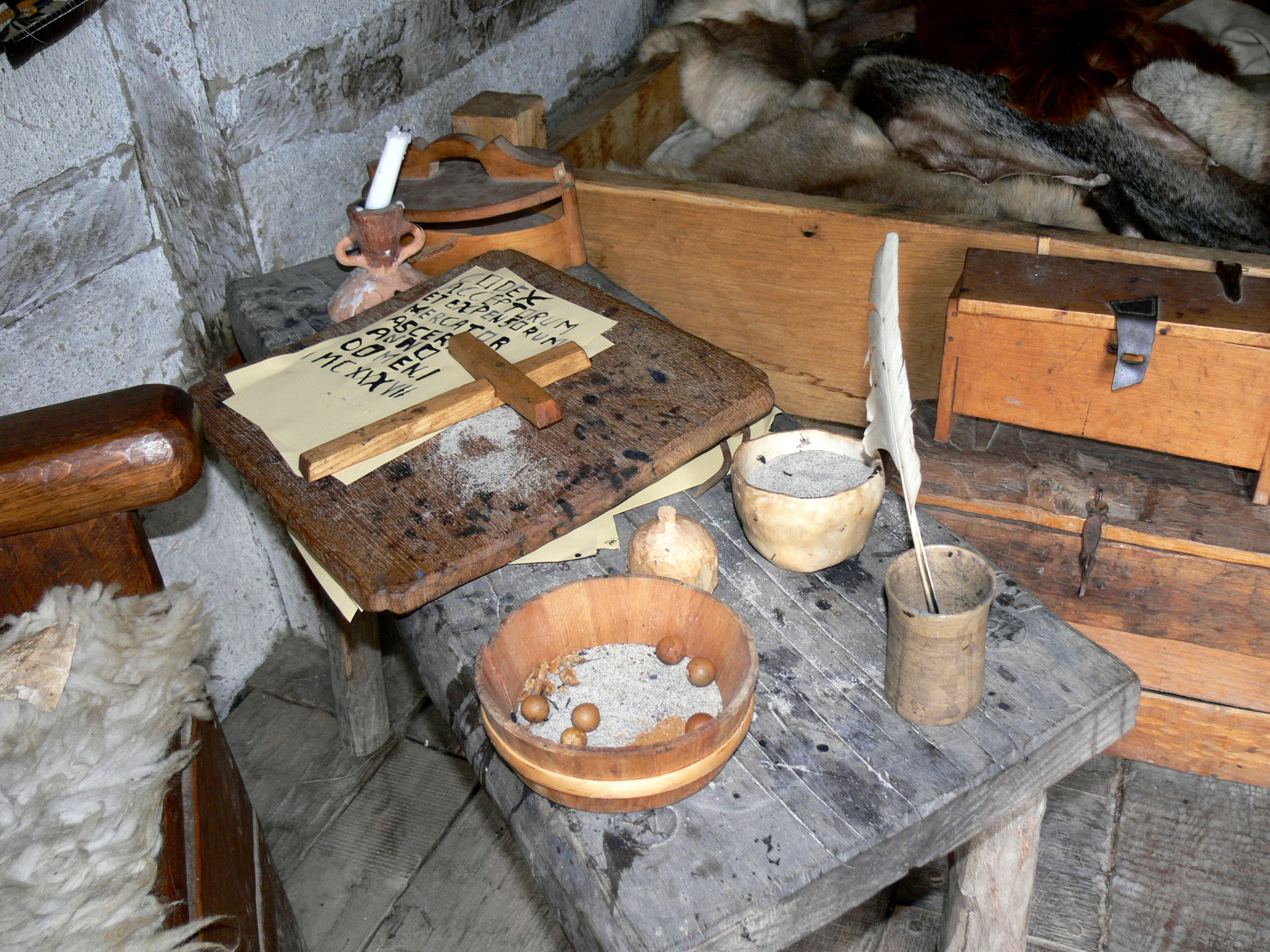
A monk's writing room

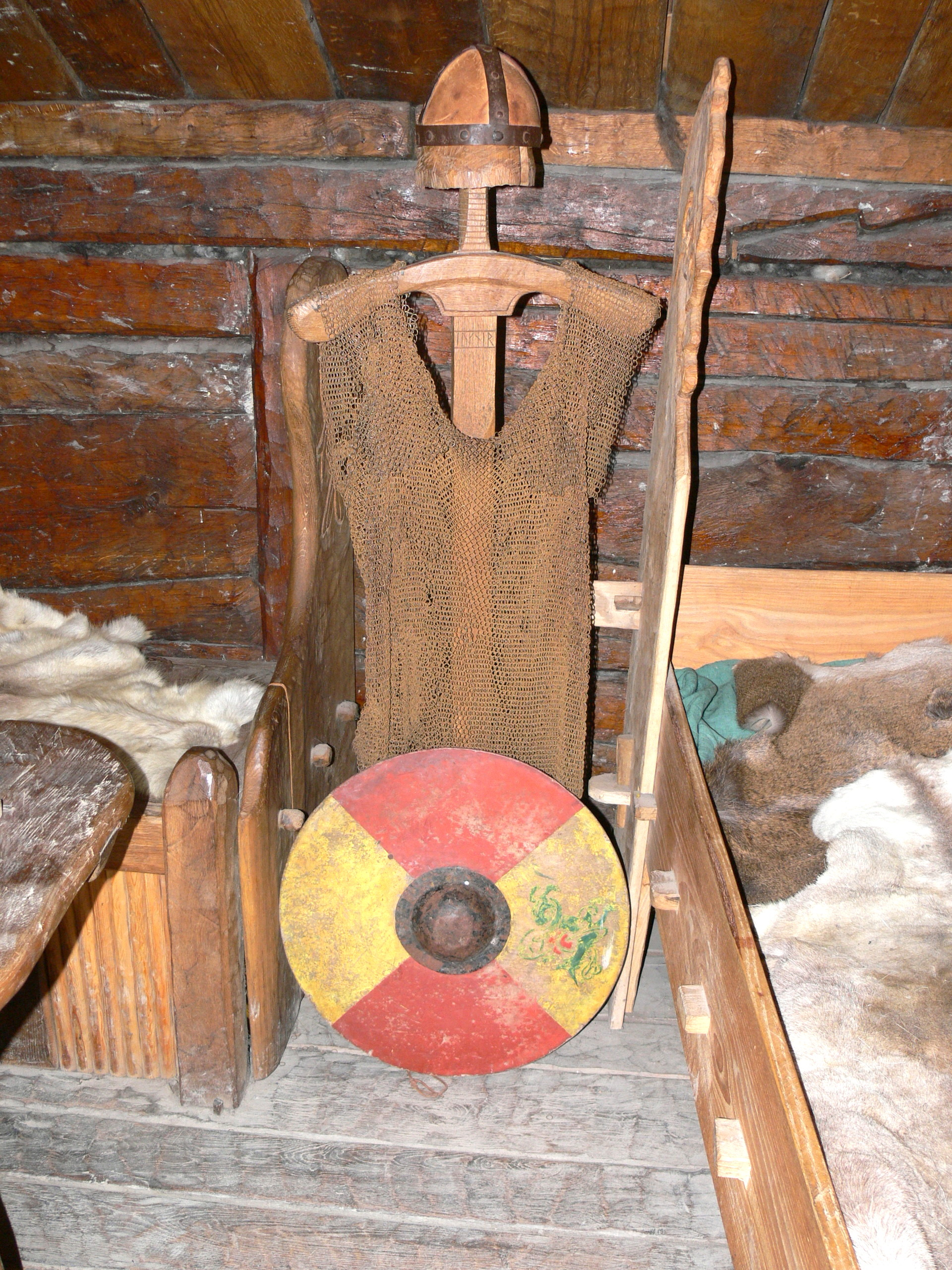
Viking war equipment.

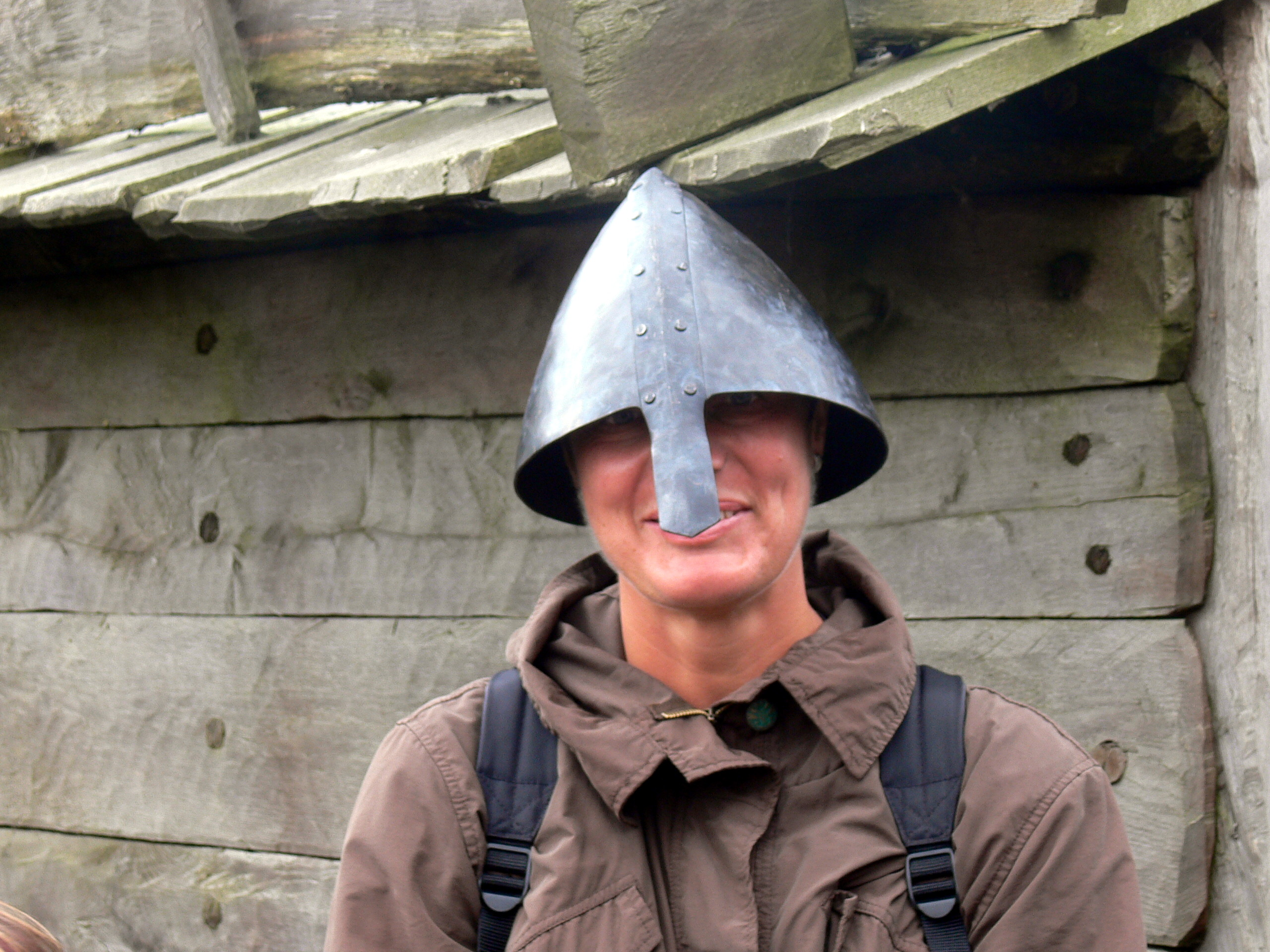
Modern helmet in Viking look with nose protection

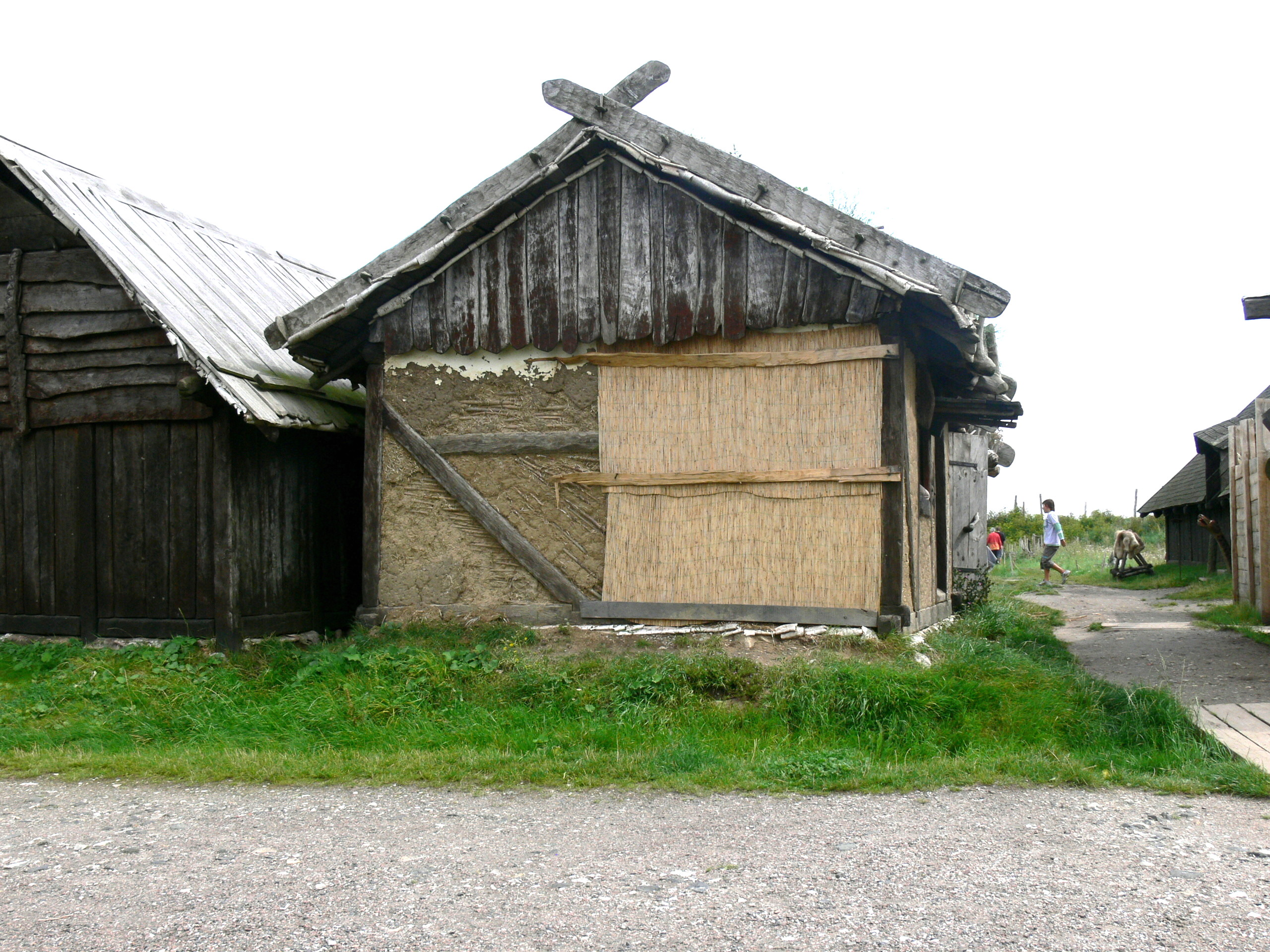
Wooden house with exposed wall structure

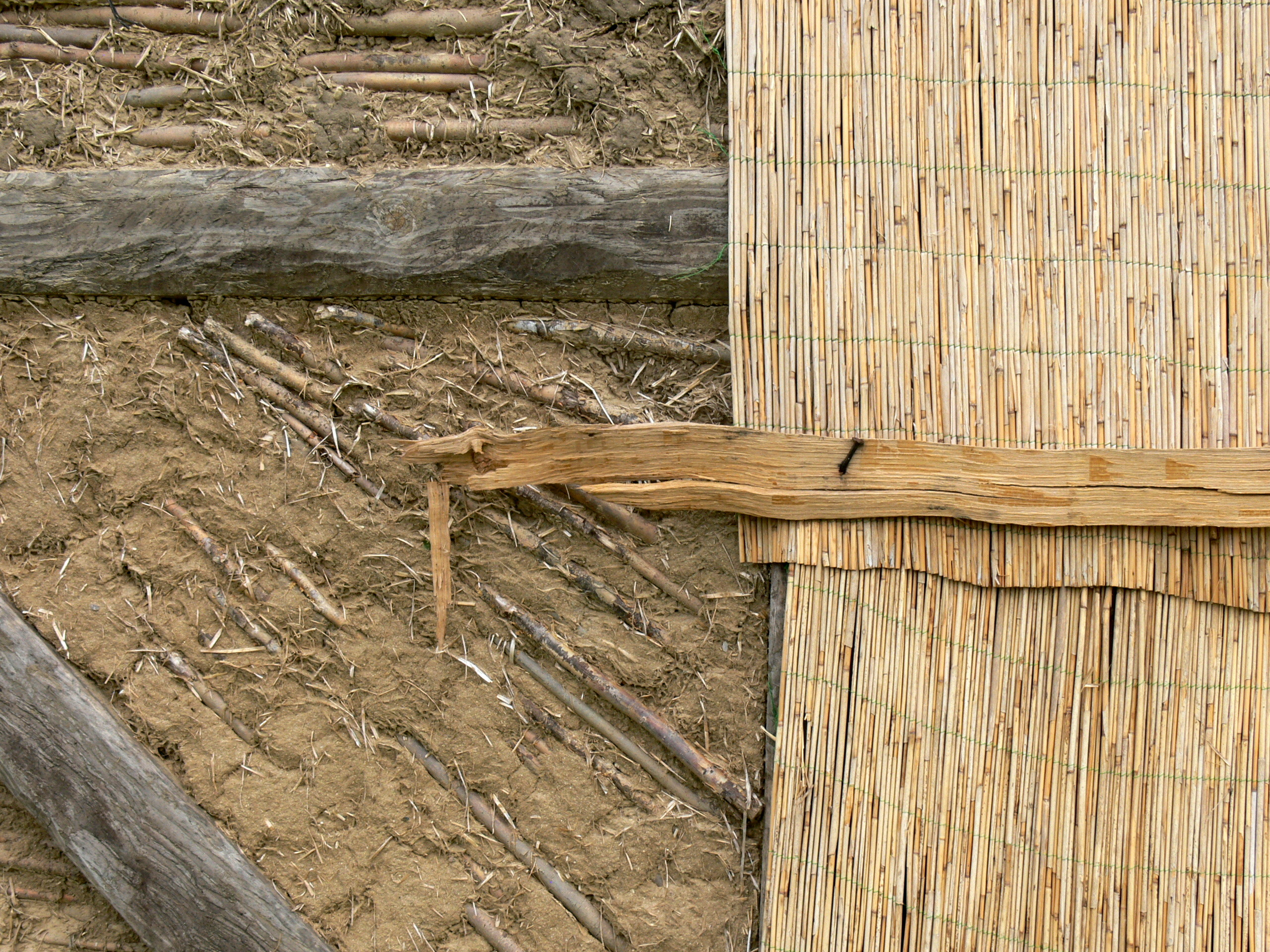
Wall structure of a Viking hut made of straw, clay and wattle

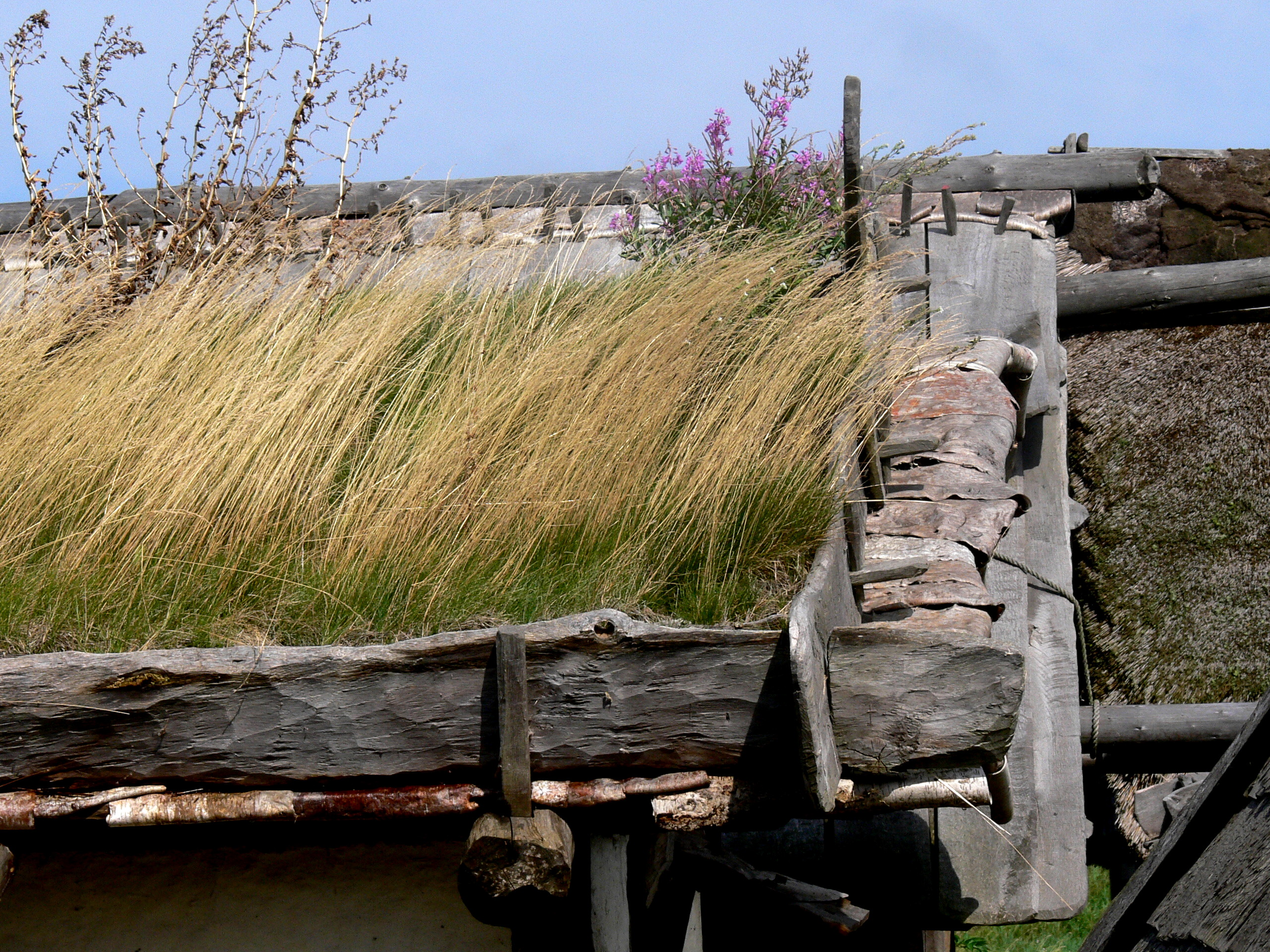
Grassy roof with wooden gutter

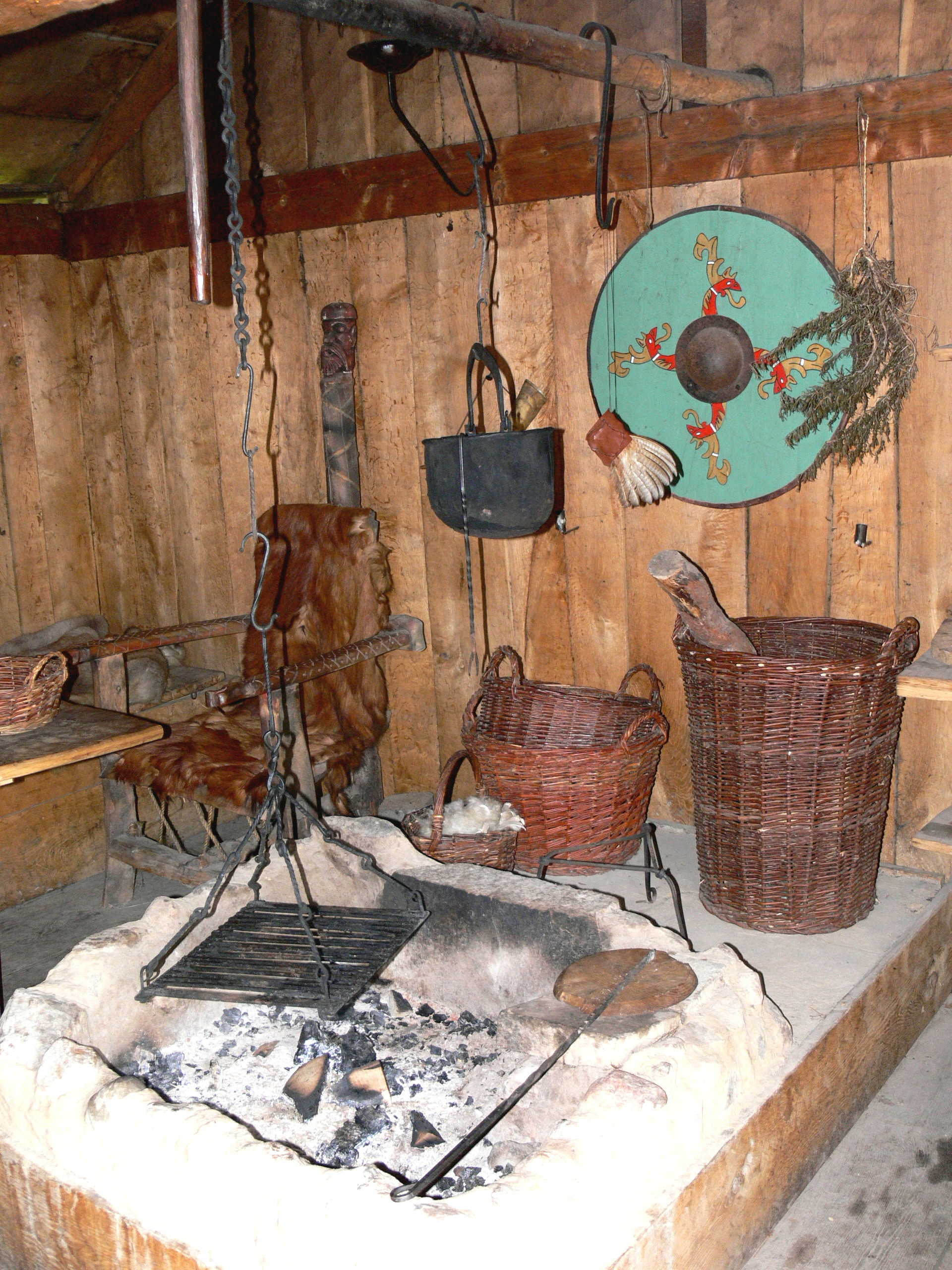
Fire pit with sign on the wall.

== See also ==
- List of runestones
