= Erik Pärsson =

Swedish footballer

Personal information
- Date of birth: 10 May 1994 (age 32)
- Height: 1.88 m (6 ft 2 in)
- Position: Striker

Team information
- Current team: Landskrona
- Number: 14

Youth career
- Höllvikens GIF
- Malmö FF

Senior career*
Years	Team	Apps	(Gls)
2013–2014	→ Lunds BK (loan)	31	(5)
2014–2015	FC Höllviken	36	(23)
2016	Landskrona	22	(17)
2017–2018	Falkenbergs FF	57	(20)
2019	OFI	5	(0)
2019–2020	Mjällby AIF	15	(1)
2021–	Landskrona	5	(1)
- * Club domestic league appearances and goals as of 4 April 2022

Erik Pärsson (born 10 May 1994) is a Swedish football striker who plays for Landskrona.

== Club career ==
Besides Sweden, he has played in Greece.

On 14 January 2021, Pärsson returned to Landskrona on two-year contract.
