= BK Höllviken =

Swedish football club

- Full name: Bollklubben Höllviken
- Founded: 1933 as Höllvikens GIF
- Ground: Höllvikens IP; Höllviken; Sweden
- Capacity: 1,900
- League: Division 3 Sydvästra Skåne
- 2016: Division 1 Södra, 14th (relegated)
- Website: http://www.bkhollviken.se
Home colours	Away colours

BK Höllviken is a Swedish football club located in Höllviken, Skåne. The club was founded as Höllvikens GIF in 1933 and it was the name of the club until 7 December 2011, when they changed it to FC Höllviken.

== Background ==
Since their foundation on 4 October 1933 BK Höllviken has participated mainly in the middle and lower divisions of the Swedish football league system. The club currently plays in Division 3 which is the sixth tier of Swedish football. The club previously had two senior teams called FC Höllviken (in Division 1) and BK Höllviken (in Division 3). After the 2016 season FC Höllviken was dissolved. They play their home matches at Höllvikens IP.

BK Höllviken are affiliated to the Skånes Fotbollförbund.

== Season to season ==
Season	Level	Division	Section	Position	Movements
1993	Tier 5	Division 4	Skåne Sydvästra	2nd	
1994	Tier 5	Division 4	Skåne Sydvästra	2nd	Promoted
1995	Tier 4	Division 3	Södra Götaland	4th	
1996	Tier 4	Division 3	Södra Götaland	8th	
1997	Tier 4	Division 3	Södra Götaland	5th	
1998	Tier 4	Division 3	Södra Götaland	1st	Promoted
1999	Tier 3	Division 2	Södra Götaland	11th	Relegated
2000	Tier 4	Division 3	Södra Götaland	2nd	Promotion Playoffs – Promoted
2001	Tier 3	Division 2	Södra Götaland	5th	
2002	Tier 3	Division 2	Södra Götaland	8th	
2003	Tier 3	Division 2	Södra Götaland	3rd	
2004	Tier 3	Division 2	Södra Götaland	10th	Relegation Playoffs
2005	Tier 3	Division 2	Södra Götaland	6th	
2006*	Tier 4	Division 2	Södra Götaland	8th	
2007	Tier 4	Division 2	Södra Götaland	6th	
2008	Tier 4	Division 2	Södra Götaland	7th	
2009	Tier 4	Division 2	Södra Götaland	2nd	
2010	Tier 4	Division 2	Södra Götaland	6th	
2011	Tier 4	Division 2	Södra Götaland	12th	Relegated
2012	Tier 5	Division 3	Södra Götaland	4th	
2013	Tier 5	Division 3	Södra Götaland	1st	Promoted
2014	Tier 4	Division 2	Östra Götaland	1st	Promoted

* League restructuring in 2006 resulted in a new division being created at Tier 3 and subsequent divisions dropping a level.
