= Höllviken =

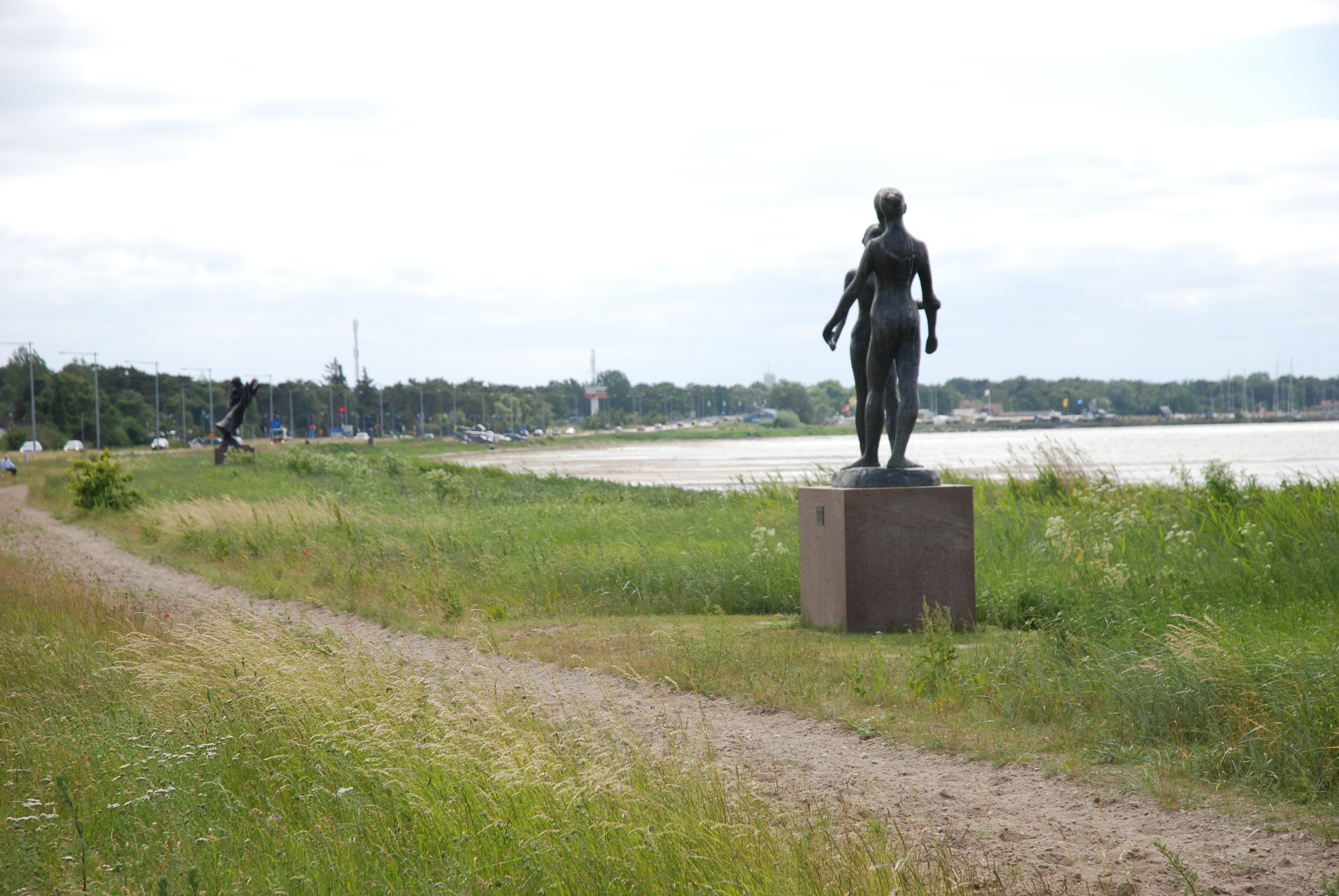
- Sculptures on the north coast of Höllviken.

- Location within Skåne Location within Sweden
- Coordinates: 55°25′N 12°57′E
- Country: Sweden
- Province: Skåne
- County: Skåne County
- Municipality: Vellinge Municipality

Area
  - Total: 6.54 km^{2} (2.53 sq mi)

Population (31 December 2010)
  - Total: 10,607
  - Density: 1,622/km^{2} (4,200/sq mi)
- Time zone: UTC+1 (CET)
  - Summer (DST): UTC+2 (CEST)

Höllviken is a locality situated in Vellinge Municipality, Skåne County, Sweden with 15,678 inhabitants in 2019. It is located close to both Malmö and the Øresund Bridge which connects Sweden and Denmark.

The town is a popular summer vacation spot for northern Europeans, who are attracted to its sandy beaches and the historical sites which date back to the time of the Vikings. The peninsula on which the town is situated is unique because it is surrounded by two different seas: Öresund and the Baltic Sea.

Prior to the 1960s, the peninsula remained mainly populated by wealthy businessmen from the Malmö region during the summers. Recently, however, it has begun to grow as a commuter town.

The following sports clubs are located in Höllviken:

- FC Höllviken

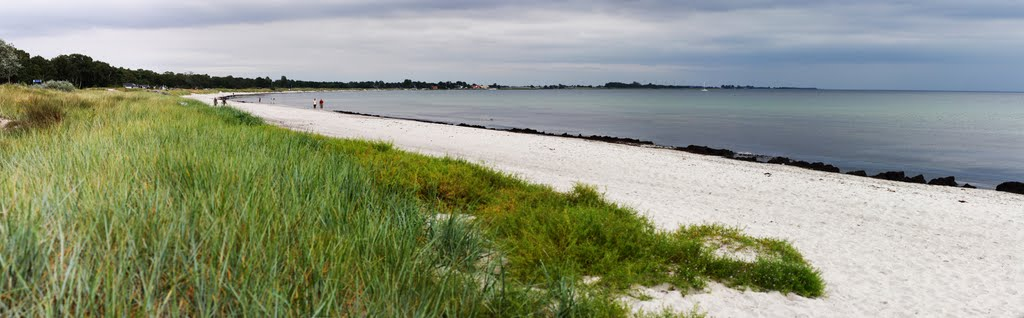
Höllviken's popular beach by the Baltic Sea
