= 2007 Division 2 (Swedish football) =

Swedish League Division 2
- Season: 2007
- Champions: Ersboda SK; IK Brage; Arameiska-Syrianska KIF; Motala AIF; Lindome GIF; Malmö Anadolu
- Promoted: 6 teams above
- Relegated: 12 teams

The following are the statistics of the Swedish football Division 2 for the 2007 season.

== League standings ==
=== Division 2 Norrland ===
Pos	Team	Pld	W	D	L	GF	GA	GD	Pts	Promotion or relegation
1	Ersboda (P)	22	15	6	1	67	23	+44	51	Promotion to Division 1
2	IFK Luleå	22	15	4	3	54	25	+29	49	
3	Friska Viljor	22	11	5	6	42	38	+4	38	
4	Skellefteå FF	22	8	9	5	43	28	+15	33	
5	Anundsjö	22	9	4	9	43	35	+8	31	
6	IFK Holmsund	22	8	7	7	39	36	+3	31	
7	Robertsfors	22	6	8	8	27	29	−2	26	
8	Umedalen	22	6	6	10	33	44	−11	24	
9	Infjärden	22	6	6	10	38	51	−13	24	
10	Kiruna	22	4	8	10	24	50	−26	20	Division 3 Relegation Playoffs
11	IFK Sundsvall (R)	22	5	4	13	22	45	−23	19	Relegation to Division 3
12	Luleå FF (R)	22	3	5	14	25	53	−28	14	Relegation to Division 3

Rules for classification: 1) points; 2) goal difference; 3) number of goals scored.
(P) Promoted; (R) Relegated

=== Division 2 Norra Svealand ===
Pos	Team	Pld	W	D	L	GF	GA	GD	Pts	Promotion or relegation
1	IK Brage (P)	22	17	4	1	65	20	+45	55	Promotion to Division 1
2	Syrianska IF Kerburan	22	16	1	5	53	20	+33	49	
3	Sandvikens IF	22	13	6	3	56	28	+28	45	
4	IK Frej	22	12	3	7	38	33	+5	39	
5	Västerås IK	22	10	4	8	36	30	+6	34	
6	Hudiksvall	22	9	2	11	44	43	+1	29	
7	Älvsjö	22	8	5	9	38	45	−7	29	
8	Vallentuna	22	7	7	8	47	44	+3	28	
9	Heby AIF	22	6	4	12	20	38	−18	22	
10	Brynäs	22	5	4	13	22	55	−33	19	Division 3 Relegation Playoffs
11	Värtan (R)	22	4	3	15	28	46	−18	15	Relegation to Division 3
12	Kubikenborg (R)	22	2	3	17	19	64	−45	9	Relegation to Division 3

Rules for classification: 1) points; 2) goal difference; 3) number of goals scored.
(P) Promoted; (R) Relegated

=== Division 2 Östra Svealand ===
Pos	Team	Pld	W	D	L	GF	GA	GD	Pts	Promotion or relegation
1	Arameiska-Syrianska KIF (P)	22	14	4	4	55	31	+24	46	Promotion to Division 1
2	Eskilstuna City	22	13	4	5	51	32	+19	43	
3	Rynninge	22	11	7	4	48	28	+20	40	
4	Nyköpings BIS	22	11	6	5	49	45	+4	39	
5	Akropolis IF	22	11	4	7	57	38	+19	37	
6	Värmbol	22	9	6	7	36	34	+2	33	
7	Enskede	22	9	4	9	27	37	−10	31	
8	IFK Eskilstuna	22	7	6	9	40	56	−16	27	
9	KB Karlskoga	22	6	6	10	35	35	0	24	
10	Hammarby Talang	22	7	2	13	38	44	−6	23	Division 3 Relegation Playoffs
11	Spårvägen (R)	22	3	5	14	25	52	−27	14	Relegation to Division 3
12	Tyresö FF (R)	22	2	4	16	18	57	−39	10	Relegation to Division 3

Rules for classification: 1) points; 2) goal difference; 3) number of goals scored.
(P) Promoted; (R) Relegated

=== Division 2 Mellersta Götaland ===
Pos	Team	Pld	W	D	L	GF	GA	GD	Pts	Promotion or relegation
1	Motala AIF (P)	22	16	1	5	65	29	+36	49	Promotion to Division 1
2	IK Sleipner	22	14	5	3	54	24	+30	47	
3	Myresjö IF	22	11	6	5	38	30	+8	39	
4	Tenhult	22	10	4	8	46	43	+3	34	
5	Smedby	22	10	2	10	39	36	+3	32	
6	Linköping	22	8	5	9	27	39	−12	29	
7	Kenty	22	7	7	8	24	33	−9	28	
8	Ljungby	22	8	3	11	54	46	+8	27	
9	Tord	22	8	3	11	34	44	−10	27	
10	Lindsdal	22	7	5	10	36	38	−2	26	Division 3 Relegation Playoffs
11	Tibro (R)	22	7	4	11	28	42	−14	25	Relegation to Division 3
12	IF Heimer (R)	22	3	1	18	18	69	−51	10	Relegation to Division 3

Rules for classification: 1) points; 2) goal difference; 3) number of goals scored.
(P) Promoted; (R) Relegated

=== Division 2 Västra Götaland ===
Pos	Team	Pld	W	D	L	GF	GA	GD	Pts	Promotion or relegation
1	Lindome (P)	22	14	3	5	27	20	+7	45	Promotion to Division 1
2	Varbergs BoIS	22	13	3	6	40	25	+15	42	
3	Jonsered	22	11	7	4	38	23	+15	40	
4	Kinna	22	10	6	6	30	20	+10	36	
5	Mellerud	22	10	3	9	30	30	0	33	
6	Fässberg	22	9	5	8	28	34	−6	32	
7	Lärje-Angered	22	6	11	5	30	24	+6	29	
8	Ahlafors	22	7	5	10	38	41	−3	26	
9	Gunnilse	22	8	2	12	32	46	−14	26	
10	IK Oddevold	22	6	7	9	26	25	+1	25	Division 3 Relegation Playoffs
11	Sandared (R)	22	4	4	14	15	39	−24	16	Relegation to Division 3
12	Skene (R)	22	3	6	13	18	35	−17	15	Relegation to Division 3

Rules for classification: 1) points; 2) goal difference; 3) number of goals scored.
(P) Promoted; (R) Relegated

=== Division 2 Södra Götaland ===
Pos	Team	Pld	W	D	L	GF	GA	GD	Pts	Promotion or relegation
1	Malmö Anadolu (P)	22	19	2	1	59	20	+39	59	Promotion to Division 1
2	Helsingborgs Södra BIS	22	15	3	4	63	26	+37	48	
3	Lunds BK	22	13	4	5	48	28	+20	43	
4	Högaborg	22	12	3	7	49	39	+10	39	
5	Karlskrona	22	9	5	8	34	39	−5	32	
6	Höllvikens GIF	22	9	2	11	30	39	−9	29	
7	IFK Hässleholm	22	6	7	9	33	37	−4	25	
8	Sölvesborg	22	7	3	12	39	51	−12	24	
9	Laholm	22	7	2	13	28	39	−11	23	
10	GIF Nike	22	6	3	13	24	44	−20	21	Division 3 Relegation Playoffs
11	Kirseberg (R)	22	6	0	16	25	45	−20	18	Relegation to Division 3
12	Älmeboda/Linneryd (R)	22	4	4	14	23	48	−25	16	Relegation to Division 3

Rules for classification: 1) points; 2) goal difference; 3) number of goals scored.
(P) Promoted; (R) Relegated
