= 2007 in Swedish football =

The 2007 season in Swedish football, starting January 2007 and ending December 2007:

== Honours ==
=== Official titles ===
Title	Team	Reason
Swedish Champions 2007	IFK Göteborg	Winners of Allsvenskan
Swedish Cup Champions 2007	Kalmar FF	Winners of Svenska Cupen
Swedish Super Cup Champions 2007	IF Elfsborg	Winners of Supercupen

=== Competitions ===
Level	Competition	Team
1st level	Allsvenskan 2007	IFK Göteborg
2nd level	Superettan 2007	IFK Norrköping
3rd level	Division 1 Norra 2007	Assyriska FF
3rd level	Division 1 Södra 2007	Qviding FIF
Cup	Svenska Cupen 2007	Kalmar FF
Super Cup	Supercupen 2007	IF Elfsborg

== Promotions, relegations and qualifications ==
=== Promotions ===
Promoted from	Promoted to	Team	Reason
Superettan 2007	Allsvenskan 2008	IFK Norrköping	Winners
Superettan 2007	Allsvenskan 2008	Ljungskile SK	2nd team
Superettan 2007	Allsvenskan 2008	GIF Sundsvall	3rd team
Division 1 Norra 2007	Superettan 2008	Assyriska FF	Winners
Division 1 Norra 2007	Superettan 2008	Väsby United	2nd team
Division 1 Södra 2007	Superettan 2008	Qviding FIF	Winners
Division 1 Södra 2007	Superettan 2008	Ängelholms FF	2nd team
Division 2 2007	Division 1 2008	Arameiska/Syrianska KIF	Winners of group
Division 2 2007	Division 1 2008	IK Brage	Winners of group
Division 2 2007	Division 1 2008	Ersboda SK	Winners of group
Division 2 2007	Division 1 2008	Lindome GIF	Winners of group
Division 2 2007	Division 1 2008	Malmö Anadolu BI	Winners of group
Division 2 2007	Division 1 2008	Motala AIF	Winners of group

=== Relegations ===
Relegated from	Relegated to	Team	Reason
Allsvenskan 2007	Superettan 2008	IF Brommapojkarna	14th team
Superettan 2007	Division 1 2008	Östers IF	15th team
Superettan 2007	Division 1 2008	IF Sylvia	16th team
Division 1 Norra 2007	Division 2 2008	Skiljebo SK	13th team
Division 1 Norra 2007	Division 2 2008	IFK Timrå	14th team
Division 1 Södra 2007	Division 2 2008	Kristianstads FF	13th team
Division 1 Södra 2007	Division 2 2008	Visby IF Gute	14th team

=== International qualifications ===
Qualified for	Enters	Team	Reason
UEFA Champions League 2008–09	1st qual. round	IFK Göteborg	Winners of Allsvenskan
UEFA Cup 2008–09	1st qual. round	Djurgårdens IF	2nd/3rd team in Allsvenskan
UEFA Cup 2008–09	1st qual. round	Kalmar FF	Winners/Runners-up of Sv. Cupen
UEFA Cup 2008–09	1st qual. round	Not yet decided	UEFA Fair Play winners
UEFA Intertoto Cup 2008	1st round	IF Elfsborg	3rd/4th team in Allsvenskan
Royal League 2007–08	–	–	–

== Domestic results ==
=== Allsvenskan ===
Pos	Team	Pld	W	D	L	GF	GA	GD	Pts	Qualification or relegation
1	IFK Göteborg (C)	26	14	7	5	45	23	+22	49	Qualification to Champions League first qualifying round
2	Kalmar FF	26	15	3	8	43	32	+11	48	Qualification to UEFA Cup first qualifying round
3	Djurgårdens IF	26	13	7	6	39	24	+15	46	Qualification to UEFA Cup first qualifying round
4	IF Elfsborg	26	10	10	6	39	30	+9	40	Qualification to Intertoto Cup first round
5	AIK	26	10	8	8	30	27	+3	38	
6	Hammarby IF	26	11	3	12	35	31	+4	36	
7	Halmstads BK	26	9	9	8	33	41	−8	36	
8	Helsingborgs IF	26	9	8	9	49	37	+12	35	
9	Malmö FF	26	9	7	10	29	28	+1	34	
10	Gefle IF	26	9	7	10	29	30	−1	34	
11	GAIS	26	7	8	11	24	37	−13	29	
12	Örebro SK	26	6	7	13	28	45	−17	25	
13	Trelleborgs FF	26	5	8	13	22	38	−16	23	
14	IF Brommapojkarna (R)	26	5	8	13	21	43	−22	23	Relegation to Superettan

Source: svenskfotboll.se (in Swedish)
Rules for classification: 1) points; 2) goal difference; 3) number of goals scored.
(C) Champions; (R) Relegated

=== Superettan ===
Pos	Team	Pld	W	D	L	GF	GA	GD	Pts	Promotion or relegation
1	IFK Norrköping (C, P)	30	20	3	7	62	29	+33	63	Promotion to Allsvenskan
2	Ljungskile SK (P)	30	17	4	9	42	35	+7	55	Promotion to Allsvenskan
3	GIF Sundsvall (P)	30	16	6	8	48	32	+16	54	Promotion to Allsvenskan
4	BK Häcken	30	17	2	11	51	30	+21	53	
5	Bunkeflo	30	14	6	10	49	49	0	48	
6	Åtvidabergs FF	30	14	5	11	44	35	+9	47	
7	IK Sirius	30	13	4	13	53	50	+3	43	
8	Degerfors IF	30	10	8	12	34	40	−6	38	
9	Mjällby AIF	30	9	9	12	39	40	−1	36	
10	Örgryte IS	30	10	6	14	40	52	−12	36	
11	Landskrona BoIS	30	9	8	13	39	45	−6	35	
12	Enköpings SK	30	9	8	13	25	38	−13	35	
13	Jönköpings Södra IF	30	9	7	14	35	47	−12	34	
14	Falkenbergs FF	30	9	7	14	35	52	−17	34	
15	Östers IF (R)	30	8	8	14	28	35	−7	32	Relegation to Division 1
16	IF Sylvia (R)	30	6	9	15	36	51	−15	27	Relegation to Division 1

Source: svenskfotboll.se (in Swedish)
Rules for classification: 1) points; 2) goal difference; 3) number of goals scored.
(C) Champions; (P) Promoted; (R) Relegated

=== 2007 Division 1 Norra ===
Pos	Team	Pld	W	D	L	GF	GA	GD	Pts	Promotion or relegation
1	Assyriska FF (C, P)	26	17	3	6	53	27	+26	54	Promotion to Superettan
2	FC Väsby United (P)	26	15	6	5	51	31	+20	51	Promotion to Superettan
3	Vasalund/Essinge IF	26	15	4	7	54	29	+25	49	
4	Syrianska FC	26	14	4	8	37	28	+9	46	
5	BK Forward	26	11	8	7	43	28	+15	41	
6	Västerås SK	26	11	4	11	45	39	+6	37	
7	Boden	26	11	4	11	26	33	−7	37	
8	Umeå FC	26	10	5	11	50	43	+7	35	
9	Falu FK	26	8	7	11	31	44	−13	31	
10	Gröndal	26	8	6	12	32	45	−13	30	
11	Östersunds FK	26	7	8	11	39	40	−1	29	
12	Valsta Syrianska IK	26	7	8	11	31	33	−2	29	
13	Skiljebo SK (R)	26	6	9	11	28	43	−15	27	Relegation to Division 2
14	IFK Timrå (R)	26	1	6	19	20	77	−57	9	Relegation to Division 2

Source: svenskfotboll.se (in Swedish)
Rules for classification: 1) points; 2) goal difference; 3) number of goals scored.
(C) Champions; (P) Promoted; (R) Relegated

=== 2007 Division 1 Södra ===
Pos	Team	Pld	W	D	L	GF	GA	GD	Pts	Promotion or relegation
1	Qviding FIF (C, P)	26	19	3	4	72	29	+43	60	Promotion to Superettan
2	Ängelholms FF (P)	26	18	1	7	76	37	+39	55	Promotion to Superettan
3	Västra Frölunda	26	14	8	4	43	23	+20	50	
4	IFK Malmö	26	15	3	8	58	46	+12	48	
5	IFK Värnamo	26	12	6	8	50	36	+14	42	
6	FC Trollhättan	26	10	6	10	40	33	+7	36	
7	Carlstad United BK	26	9	6	11	39	45	−6	33	
8	Skövde AIK	26	8	9	9	37	46	−9	33	
9	Husqvarna FF	26	8	5	13	24	41	−17	29	
10	Norrby IF	26	7	7	12	38	57	−19	28	
11	Torslanda IK	26	6	9	11	33	43	−10	27	
12	Skärhamns IK	26	7	6	13	38	56	−18	27	
13	Kristianstads FF (R)	26	7	3	16	40	61	−21	24	Relegation to Division 2
14	Visby IF Gute (R)	26	4	4	18	34	69	−35	16	Relegation to Division 2

Source: svenskfotboll.se (in Swedish)
Rules for classification: 1) points; 2) goal difference; 3) number of goals scored.
(C) Champions; (P) Promoted; (R) Relegated

=== 2007 Svenska Cupen ===
Final

September 27, 2007

Kalmar FF	3–0	IFK Göteborg

Fredriksskans, Kalmar

=== 2007 Supercupen ===
Final

March 31, 2007

IF Elfsborg	1–0	Helsingborgs IF

Borås Arena, Borås
