= Måns Sörensson =

Swedish footballer

Personal information
- Full name: Måns Love Sörensson
- Date of birth: 2 April 1986 (age 40)
- Place of birth: Landskrona, Sweden
- Height: 1.81 m (5 ft 11 in)
- Position: Striker

Youth career
- 1991–2003: Landskrona BoIS
- 2004: → Ajax (loan)

Senior career*
Years	Team	Apps	(Gls)
2003–2006	Landskrona BoIS	15	(0)
2006	→ Ängelholms FF (loan)	13	(2)
2007	Falkenbergs FF	14	(0)
2008–2009	IFK Malmö	23	(10)
2012–2013	Borstahusens BK	23	(5)
Total		88	(17)

International career
2001–2003	Sweden U17	19	(18)
2004–2005	Sweden U19	7	(2)
- * Club domestic league appearances and goals

Måns Love Sörensson (born 2 April 1986) is a Swedish former professional footballer who played as a striker. Beginning his career with Landskrona BoIS in 2003, he had brief stints with Ajax, Ängelholms FF, and Falkenbergs FF before retiring at IFK Malmö in 2009. A youth international for Sweden between 2001 and 2005, he won a total of 26 caps and scored 20 goals for the Sweden U17 and U19 teams.

== Club career ==
=== Landskrona BoIS ===
Beginning his career with Landskrona BoIS in 1991, Sörensson made his senior debut for the team in a 2002 Svenska Cupen game against Tidaholms GIF at only 16 years of age. The following season, he made his Allsvenskan debut for the team on 6 October 2003 in a 3–0 away loss against AIK. He scored his first and only goal for the club in a 2005 Svenska Cupen game against Topkapi IK, as Landskrona won 3–0.

==== Loan to Ajax ====
In January 2004 Sörensson signed a six-month loan contract with AFC Ajax, joining coach Danny Blind's junior squad. His stay at Ajax was cut short after injuring his knee during a practice session, and he returned to Landskrona in the beginning of May 2004.

==== Loan to Ängelholms FF ====
He spent the second half of the 2006 season on loan at Ängelholms FF under manager Roar Hansen, scoring a total of two goals.

=== Falkenbergs FF ===
Ahead of the 2007 Superettan season, Falkenbergs FF signed Sörensson on a two-year contract from Landskrona BoIS for an estimated 200,000 SEK. He left the club after only one season.

=== IFK Malmö and retirement ===
In 2008, Sörensson signed for the Division 1 Södra club IFK Malmö. At the end of the season, he announced that he would take a time-out from football after that the club was demoted to Division 2 despite Sörensson's 10 goals in 23 games. In May 2009, Sörensson declared that he would retire from professional football at the age of 23.

=== Comeback ===
Sörensson made a brief comeback in 2012, spending two seasons with Borstahusens BK in Division 4 and then Division 3, scoring a total of 5 goals in 23 games.

== International career ==
Sörensson played in 19 games for the Sweden U17 team, scoring 18 goals. He also represented the Sweden U19 team, scoring 2 goals in 7 games.

== Personal life ==
In 2018, Sörensson opened up a bookstore in Malmö, Sweden.

== Career statistics ==
=== Club ===
Appearances and goals by club, season and competition
Club	Season	League			Svenska Cupen		Total	
Club	Season	Division	Apps	Goals	Apps	Goals	Apps	Goals
Landskrona BoIS	2002	Allsvenskan	0	0	1	0	1	0
Landskrona BoIS	2003	Allsvenskan	1	0	–		0	0
Landskrona BoIS	2004	Allsvenskan	4	0	–		4	0
Landskrona BoIS	2005	Allsvenskan	8	0	2	1	10	1
Landskrona BoIS	2006	Superettan	2	0	1	0	3	0
Landskrona BoIS	Total		15	0	4	1	18	1
Ängelholms FF (loan)	2006	Division 1 Södra	13	2	–		13	2
Falkenbergs FF	2007	Superettan	14	0	–		14	0
IFK Malmö	2008	Division 1 Södra	23	10	–		23	10
Borstahusens BK	2012	Division 4 Nordvästra Skåne	8	4	–		8	4
Borstahusens BK	2013	Division 3 Sydvästra Götaland	15	1	–		15	1
Borstahusens BK	Total		23	5	–		23	5
Career total			88	17	4	1	92	18

=== International ===
Appearances and goals by national team and year
National team	Year	Apps	Goals
Sweden U17	2001	4	3
Sweden U17	2002	10	11
Sweden U17	2003	5	4
Sweden U17	Total	19	18
Sweden U19	2004	5	1
Sweden U19	2005	2	1
Sweden U19	Total	7	2
Career total		26	20
