= 2008 Division 1 (Swedish football) =

Division 1
- Season: 2008
- Champions: Syrianska FC (north); FC Trollhättan (south)
- Promoted: Syrianska FC; Vasalunds IF; FC Trollhättan
- Relegated: Ersboda SK; Falu FK; Bodens BK; IFK Malmö; Norrby IF; Skärhamns IK
- Top goalscorer: Niklas Moberg (21)

The 2008 Division 1 was contested by 28 teams divided into two groups geographically. Syrianska FC and FC Trollhättan won their respective groups, and thereby were promoted to Superettan for the 2009 season. Vasalunds IF who finished second in the northern group were also promoted after winning their playoff.

== League tables ==
=== North ===
Pos	Team	Pld	W	D	L	GF	GA	GD	Pts	Promotion or relegation
1	Syrianska FC (C, P)	26	17	8	1	44	16	+28	59	Promotion to Superettan
2	Vasalunds IF (O, P)	26	15	6	5	57	26	+31	51	Qualification to Promotion playoffs
3	Västerås SK	26	16	3	7	59	36	+23	51	
4	Gröndal	26	15	5	6	49	33	+16	50	
5	Umeå FC	26	13	2	11	43	38	+5	41	
6	Valsta Syrianska IK	26	10	6	10	41	40	+1	36	
7	BK Forward	26	10	4	12	46	49	−3	34	
8	Syrianska Botkyrka IF	26	8	7	11	26	35	−9	31	
9	IF Sylvia	26	9	3	14	41	56	−15	30	
10	Östersunds FK	26	7	8	11	30	36	−6	29	
11	IK Brage	26	6	8	12	35	43	−8	26	
12	Ersboda (R)	26	7	4	15	48	67	−19	25	Relegation to Division 2
13	Falu FK (R)	26	7	3	16	31	49	−18	24	Relegation to Division 2
14	Boden (R)	26	5	7	14	27	53	−26	22	Relegation to Division 2

Source: svenskfotboll.se (in Swedish)
Rules for classification: 1) points; 2) goal difference; 3) number of goals scored.
(C) Champions; (O) Play-off winners; (P) Promoted; (R) Relegated

=== Group South ===
Pos	Team	Pld	W	D	L	GF	GA	GD	Pts	Promotion or relegation
1	FC Trollhättan (C, P)	26	14	7	5	41	26	+15	49	Promotion to Superettan
2	Östers IF	26	14	3	9	54	33	+21	45	Qualification to Promotion playoffs
3	Carlstad United BK	26	13	6	7	43	37	+6	45	
4	Malmö Anadolu	26	13	5	8	53	38	+15	44	
5	Skövde AIK	26	12	6	8	54	39	+15	42	
6	Motala AIF	26	11	6	9	41	46	−5	39	
7	IFK Värnamo	26	11	5	10	31	31	0	38	
8	Västra Frölunda	26	8	11	7	45	41	+4	35	
9	Lindome	26	8	8	10	36	33	+3	32	
10	Torslanda IK	26	8	8	10	40	45	−5	32	
11	Husqvarna FF	26	8	4	14	29	35	−6	28	
12	IFK Malmö (R)	26	8	3	15	38	63	−25	27	Relegation to Division 2
13	Norrby IF (R)	26	8	2	16	38	52	−14	26	Relegation to Division 2
14	Skärhamn (R)	26	7	4	15	27	61	−34	25	Relegation to Division 2

Source: svenskfotboll.se (in Swedish)
Rules for classification: 1) points; 2) goal difference; 3) number of goals scored.
(C) Champions; (P) Promoted; (R) Relegated

== Season statistics ==
=== Northern group top scorers ===
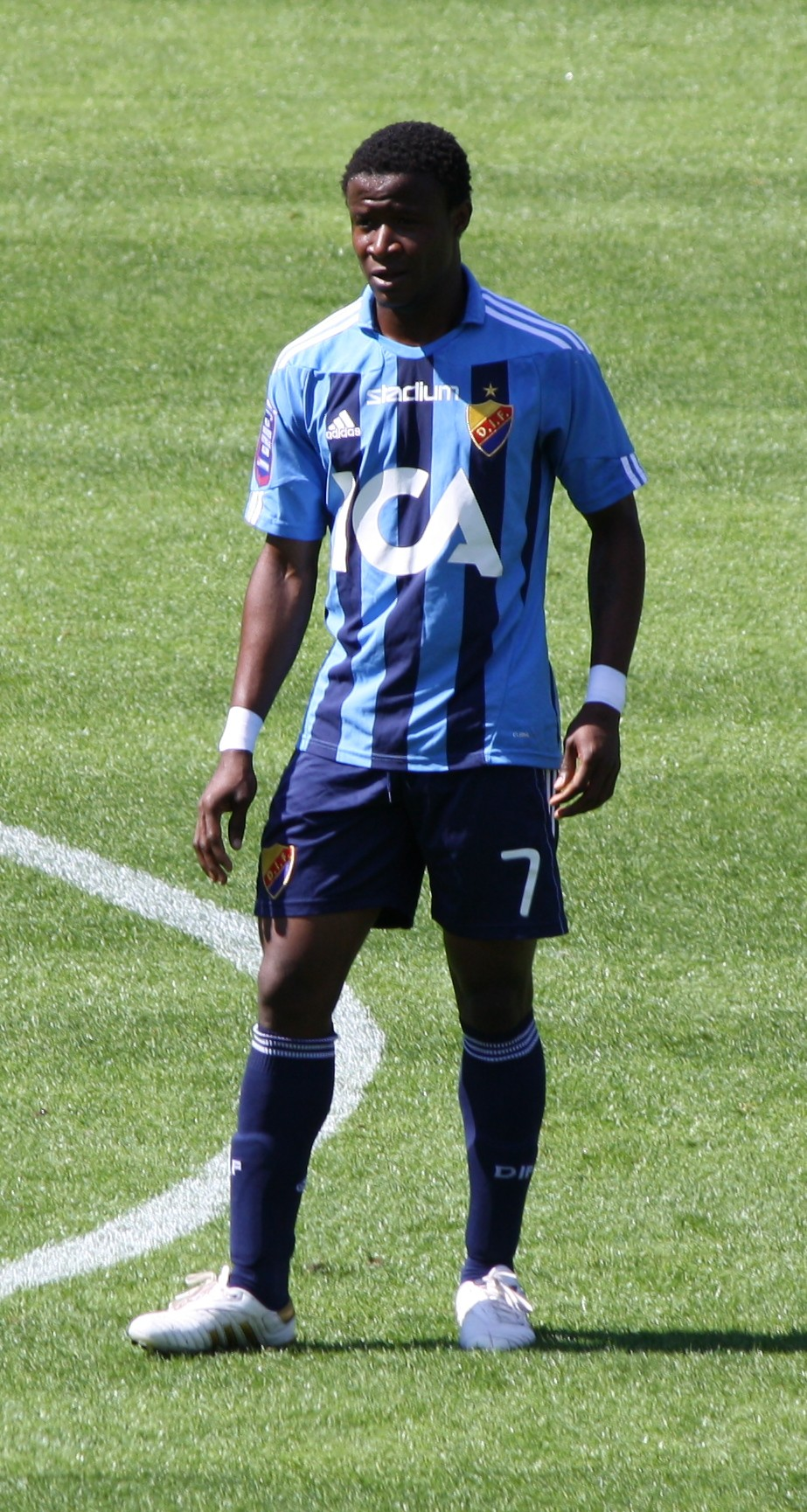
After transferring to Djurgårdens IF Kennedy Igboananike also became a top ten goalscorer in the 2010 Allsvenskan.

Rank	Player	Club	Goals
1	(Nigeria) Kennedy Igboananike	Vasalunds IF	18
2	(Sweden) Bernhard Nyström	Falu FK	14
3	(Sweden) Patrik Grönvall	Västerås SK	13
3	(Sweden) Jesper Carlsson	Gröndals IK	13
5	(Sweden) Herish Kuhi	BK Forward	12
5	(Sweden) Raby Nahir Youssef	Gröndals IK	12
7	(Sweden) Martin Andersson	Västerås SK	11
7	(Sweden) Danny Persson	Umeå FC	11
9	(Sweden) Niklas Gustafsson	BK Forward	10
10	(Sweden) Özgür Yasar	Syrianska FC	9
10	(Sweden) Erik Lundström	Ersboda SK	9

=== Southern group top scorers ===
Rank	Player	Club	Goals
1	(Sweden) Niklas Moberg	Carlstad United BK	21
2	(Argentina) Tomas Enrique Petry	Östers IF	17
3	(Sweden) Arsim Gashi	Motala AIF	14
3	(Kosovo) Liridon Rrustemaj	Malmö Anadolu	14
5	(Sweden) Jakob Orlov	Skövde AIK	13
6	(Sweden) Mårten Gustafsson	Skövde AIK	12
7	(Sweden) Måns Sörensson	IFK Malmö	10
7	(Sweden) Martin Scherdin	FC Trollhättan	10
9	(Sweden) Rami Kurdali	Lindome GIF	9
9	(Norway) Kim Roger Strand	FC Trollhättan	9
9	(Niger) William Tonji Ngounou	Malmö Anadolu	9
9	(Sweden) Daniel Leinar	Motala AIF	9

== Young Player Teams of the Year ==
At the end of each Division 1 season an all-star game is played called "Morgondagens Stjärnor" (English: "The Stars Of Tomorrow"). The two teams playing against each other consist of the best young players from each of the two leagues.

Team North
Position	Player	Club
GK	(Sweden) Lennart Sandahl	Östersunds FK
DF	(Sweden) Simon Ogunnaike	Valsta Syrianska IK
DF	(Sweden) Mattias Englund	BK Forward
DF	(Sweden) Tim Andersson	Östersunds FK
DF	(Benin) Yosif Ayuba	Vasalunds IF
DF	(Sweden) Tobias Stenman	Ersboda SK
MF / FW	(Sweden) Fredrik Wennebro	Umeå FC
MF / FW	(Sweden) Pontus Hendriks	IK Brage
MF / FW	(Sweden) Daniel Gustavsson	Västerås SK
MF / FW	(Sweden) Gökay Altuner	Valsta Syrianska IK
MF / FW	(Sweden) Anders Lillager	Falu FK
MF / FW	(Bosnia and Herzegovina) Armin Tankovic	IF Sylvia
MF / FW	(Sweden) Timmy Wilhelmsson	FC Väsby United
MF / FW	(Nigeria) Kennedy Igboananike	Vasalunds IF
MF / FW	(Sweden) Nahir Awrouhom	Syrianska Botkyrka IF
Coach	(Sweden) Peter Lenell	Vasalunds IF

Team South
Position	Player	Club
GK	(Sweden) Erik Dahlin	Västra Frölunda IF
DF	(Sweden) Simon Svensson	Motala AIF
DF	(Sweden) Månz Karlsson	Östers IF
DF	(Sweden) Jonatan Ask	Lindome GIF
DF	(Sweden) Martin Maletic	IFK Värnamo
DF	(Sweden) Bennet Gustavsson	Husqvarna FF
MF / FW	(Sweden) Ola Grändås	Motala AIF
MF / FW	(Sweden) Martin Arvidsson	Norrby IF
MF / FW	(Sweden) Tom Pettersson	FC Trollhättan
MF / FW	(Sweden) Alexander Henningsson	Östers IF
MF / FW	(Sweden) Medin Zekamani	Malmö Anadolu
MF / FW	(Sweden) Mattias Wahl	Carlstad United BK
MF / FW	(Sweden) Alexander Angelin	Västra Frölunda IF
MF / FW	(Sweden) Fredrik Törnqvist	Carlstad United BK
MF / FW	(Sweden) Axel Johansson	Östers IF
Coach	(Sweden) Göran Ekh	Motala AIF
