= Borstahusens BK =

Association football club

- Full name: Borstahusens Bollklubb
- Founded: 1922
- Ground: Ulkavallen IP; Landskrona; Sweden
- Chairman: Ulf Carlsson
- League: Division 4 Skåne Nordvästra
Home colours

Borstahusens BK is a Swedish football club located in Borstahusen, Landskrona.

== Background ==
The club was founded on 20 January 1922 at a meeting at Borstahusen. By the 1930s the club used the name Borstahusens BK and Borstahusens IF but in the 1960s the title IK Atleten was used. In 1969 the club played at its highest level in Division 2 Södra Götaland, which at that time was the second tier of Swedish football. Following relegation at the end of the 1969 season the club changed their name back to Borstahusens BK.

Borstahusens BK currently plays in Division 4 Skåne Nordvästra which is the sixth tier of Swedish football. They play their home matches at the Ulkavallen IP in Landskrona. The former Landskrona BoIS, AFC Ajax, and Sweden youth international Måns Sörensson spent the 2012 and 2013 seasons with the club.

The club is affiliated to Skånes Fotbollförbund.

== Season to season ==
IK Atleten competed in the following divisions in the 1960s:

Season	Level	Division	Section	Position	Movements
1962	Tier 4	Division 4	Skåne Mellersta	1st	Promoted
1963	Tier 3	Division 3	Södra Götaland	10th	Relegated
1964	Tier 4	Division 4	Skåne Mellersta	2nd	
1965	Tier 4	Division 4	Skåne Mellersta	2nd	
1966	Tier 4	Division 4	Skåne Mellersta	1st	Promoted
1967	Tier 3	Division 3	Skåne	5th	
1968	Tier 3	Division 3	Skåne	1st	Promoted
1969	Tier 2	Division 2	Södra Götaland	10th	Relegated

In the next two decades Borstahusens BK competed in the following divisions:

Season	Level	Division	Section	Position	Movements
1970	Tier 3	Division 3	Skåne	7th	
1971	Tier 3	Division 3	Skåne	8th	
1972	Tier 3	Division 3	Skåne	8th	
1973	Tier 3	Division 3	Skåne	7th	
1974	Tier 3	Division 3	Skåne	1st	Promotion Playoffs
1975	Tier 3	Division 3	Skåne	2nd	
1976	Tier 3	Division 3	Skåne	11th	Relegated
1977	Tier 4	Division 4	Skåne Sydvästra	2nd	
1978	Tier 4	Division 4	Skåne Sydvästra	8th	
1979	Tier 4	Division 4	Skåne Sydvästra	2nd	
1980	Tier 4	Division 4	Skåne Nordvästra	1st	Promoted
1981	Tier 3	Division 3	Sydvästra Götaland	6th	
1982	Tier 3	Division 3	Sydvästra Götaland	6th	
1983	Tier 3	Division 3	Skåne	9th	
1984	Tier 3	Division 3	Skåne	12th	Relegated
1985	Tier 4	Division 4	Skåne Nordvästra	6th	
1986	Tier 4	Division 4	Skåne Nordvästra	9th	

In recent seasons Borstahusens BK have competed in the following divisions:

Season	Level	Division	Section	Position	Movements
2006*	Tier 7	Division 5	Skåne Västra	1st	Promoted
2007	Tier 6	Division 4	Skåne Nordvästra	11th	Relegated
2008	Tier 7	Division 5	Skåne Västra	10th	Relegation Playoffs
2009	Tier 7	Division 5	Skåne Nordvästra	1st	Promoted
2010	Tier 6	Division 4	Skåne Nordvästra	4th	
2011	Tier 6	Division 4	Skåne Nordvästra	4th	

* League restructuring in 2006 resulted in a new division being created at Tier 3 and subsequent divisions dropping a level.
