= Christer Persson =

Swedish footballer

Personal information
- Full name: Hans Christer Andreas Persson
- Date of birth: 11 October 1979 (age 47)
- Place of birth: Algutsrum, Sweden
- Height: 1.83 m (6 ft 0 in)
- Position: Midfielder

Team information
- Current team: Jönköpings Södra IF (Head coach)

Youth career
- Algutsrums IF

Senior career*
Years	Team	Apps	(Gls)
1996–2004	Kalmar FF	195	(7)
2005–2006	FK Tønsberg	27	(1)
2006–2007	Pors Grenland	13	(1)
2007–2012	Jönköpings Södra IF	148	(5)

International career
1999–2000	Sweden U21	6	(0)

Managerial career
- 2013-2018: Jönköpings Södra IF (U21 & Scout & Assistant)
- 2014: Jönköpings Södra IF (Caretaker)
- 2019-2020: Motala AIF
- 2021-2024: IF Elfsborg (Assistant)
- 2024-2026: Aberdeen FC (Assistant)
- 2026-: Jönköpings Södra IF
- * Club domestic league appearances and goals as of 22 April 2018

Hans Christer Andreas Persson (born 11 October 1979) is a Swedish retired footballer who played as a midfielder and manager. He was the joint Assistant Manager of Aberdeen FC between 2024 and 2026.

He is the current manager of Jönköpings Södra IF.

== Player career ==
As a player he played 66 Allsvenskan matches for Kalmar FF, where he played a part in 3 promotions.

After some years in Norway, he went back to Småland, but this time for Jönköpings Södra IF.

== Manager career ==
After Persson retiredment in Jsödra, he had different management roles, in March and April 2014 as caretaker manager.

2019 he left Jsödra for Head manager in Motala AIF.

in 2021 he reunited with fellow Jsödra head manager Jimmy Thelin in IF Elfsborg in Allsvenskan. As he also did get to follow Thelin to be joint assist manager in Aberdeen FC between 2024 and January 2026.

On 7th October 2026, Jsödra announced Persson would return to the club, in front of the last 5 games of the season in Ettan Södra.
