= Farnerud =

Farnerud is a Swedish surname. Notable people with the surname include:

- Alexander Farnerud (born 1984), Swedish footballer, brother of Pontus
- Pontus Farnerud (born 1980), Swedish footballer
