= Axel Johansson =

Axel Johansson may refer to:

- Axel Johansson (rower) (1885–1979), Swedish rower
- Axel Johansson (speed skater) (1910–1983), Swedish speed skater
- Axel Elveljung, né Axel Johansson, born 1989, Swedish footballer
