= Borstahusen =

Fishing village in northern Landskrona, Sweden

Coordinates: 55°54′N 12°48′E

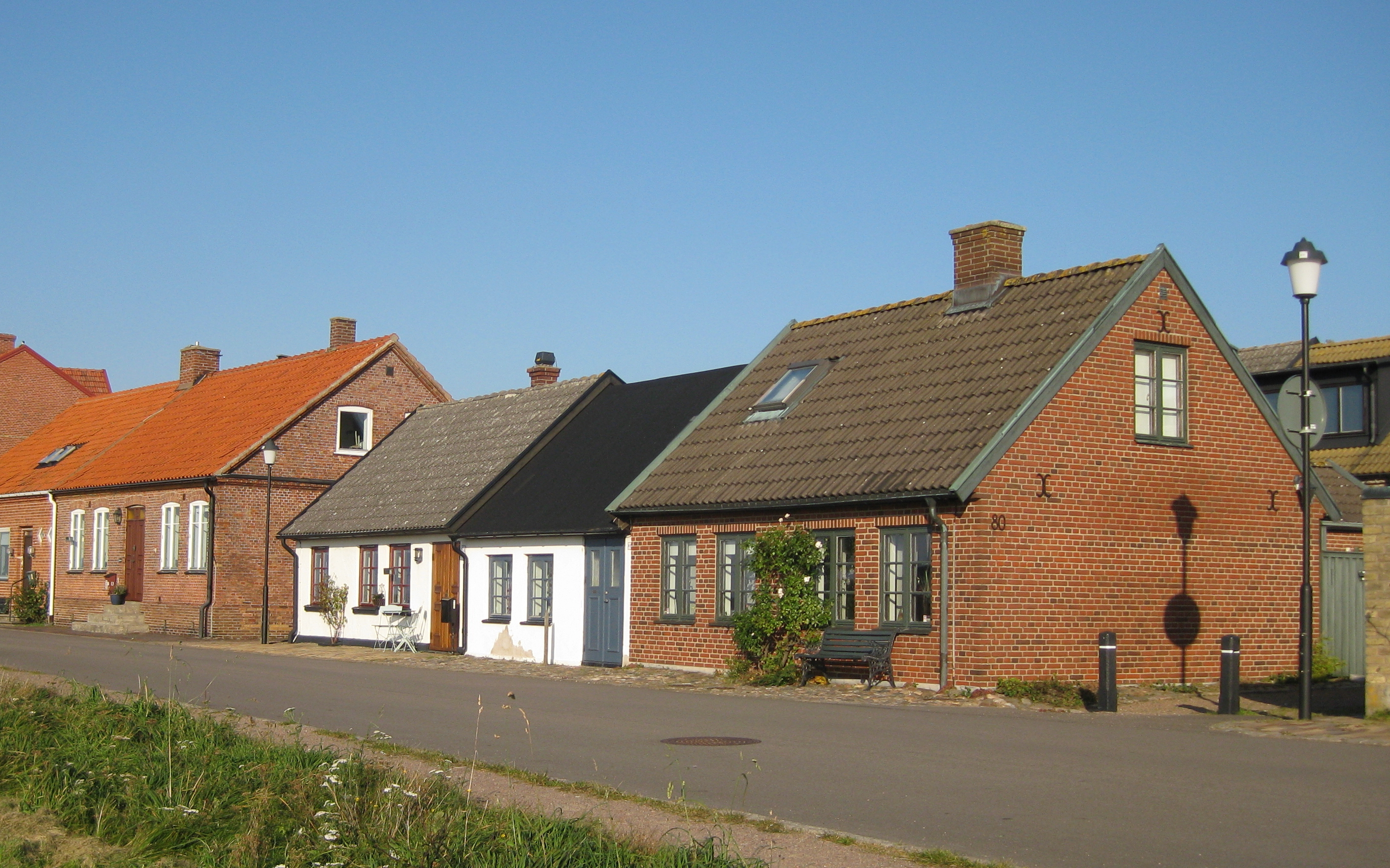
Borstahusen, Landskrona, Skåne, Sweden

Borstahusen is a former fishing village in northern Landskrona in Scania, in southern Sweden. It was founded in 1776 by the brothers Rasmus Andersson Borste and Jöns Andersson Borste, after whom the area is named.

Around the original village, a recreational area has sprung up with camping, golf courses and beaches. In the harbour, an old pump house has been converted into a museum, gallery and restaurant, designed by the architect Per Dockson.

The local soccer team is "Borstahusens Bollklubb" (BBK).

North of Borstahusen, adjacent to "Erikstorps Kungsgård" (a former royal estate) is Borstahusens vacation village and a training loop. It was built in 1960 to give local workers a place to spend the summers in a peaceful seaside setting.
