= Colin Farnerud =

Swedish footballer (born 2004)

Personal information
- Full name: Colin Elliot Farnerud
- Date of birth: 12 March 2004 (age 22)
- Place of birth: France
- Height: 1.89 m (6 ft 2 in)
- Position: Midfielder

Team information
- Current team: Jönköpings Södra IF
- Number: 21

Youth career
- IFK Göteborg
- 2012–2019: FC Mougins
- 2019–2022: Lens
- 2022–2023: VfB Stuttgart

Senior career*
Years	Team	Apps	(Gls)
2023–2024	VfB Stuttgart II	7	(0)
2024–2025	Holstein Kiel II	6	(0)
2025–	Jönköpings Södra IF	24	(0)

International career
2021	Sweden U18	4	(0)
2022	Sweden U19	1	(0)
- * Club domestic league appearances and goals as of 16 November 2026

Colin Elliot Farnerud (born 12 March 2004) is a footballer who plays as a midfielder for Jönköpings Södra IF. Born in France, he is a Sweden youth international.

== Early life ==
Farnerud lived in Norway as a child. He started playing football at the age of four.

== Club career ==
As a youth player, he joined the youth academy of Swedish side IFK Göteborg. In 2012, he joined the youth academy of French side FC Mougins. In 2019, he joined the youth academy of French side RC Lens. He was regarded as one of the club's most important players. He started his career with German side VfB Stuttgart II. On 8 April 2023, he debuted for the club during a 0–2 loss to FC 08 Homburg.

On 31 July 2024, it was confirmed that Farnerud had joined Holstein Kiel II.

29 March 2025 he signed for Swedish side Jönköpings Södra IF.

== International career ==
Farnerud represented Sweden internationally at youth level. He is eligible to represent France internationally, having been born in the country.

== Style of play ==
Farnerud mainly operates as a midfielder. He has compared his style of play to Netherlands international Frenkie de Jong.

== Personal life ==
Farnerud is the son of Sweden international Pontus Farnerud. He is the nephew of Sweden international Alexander Farnerud. He has a younger sister.
