= Pontus Farnerud =

Swedish former professional footballer (born 1980)

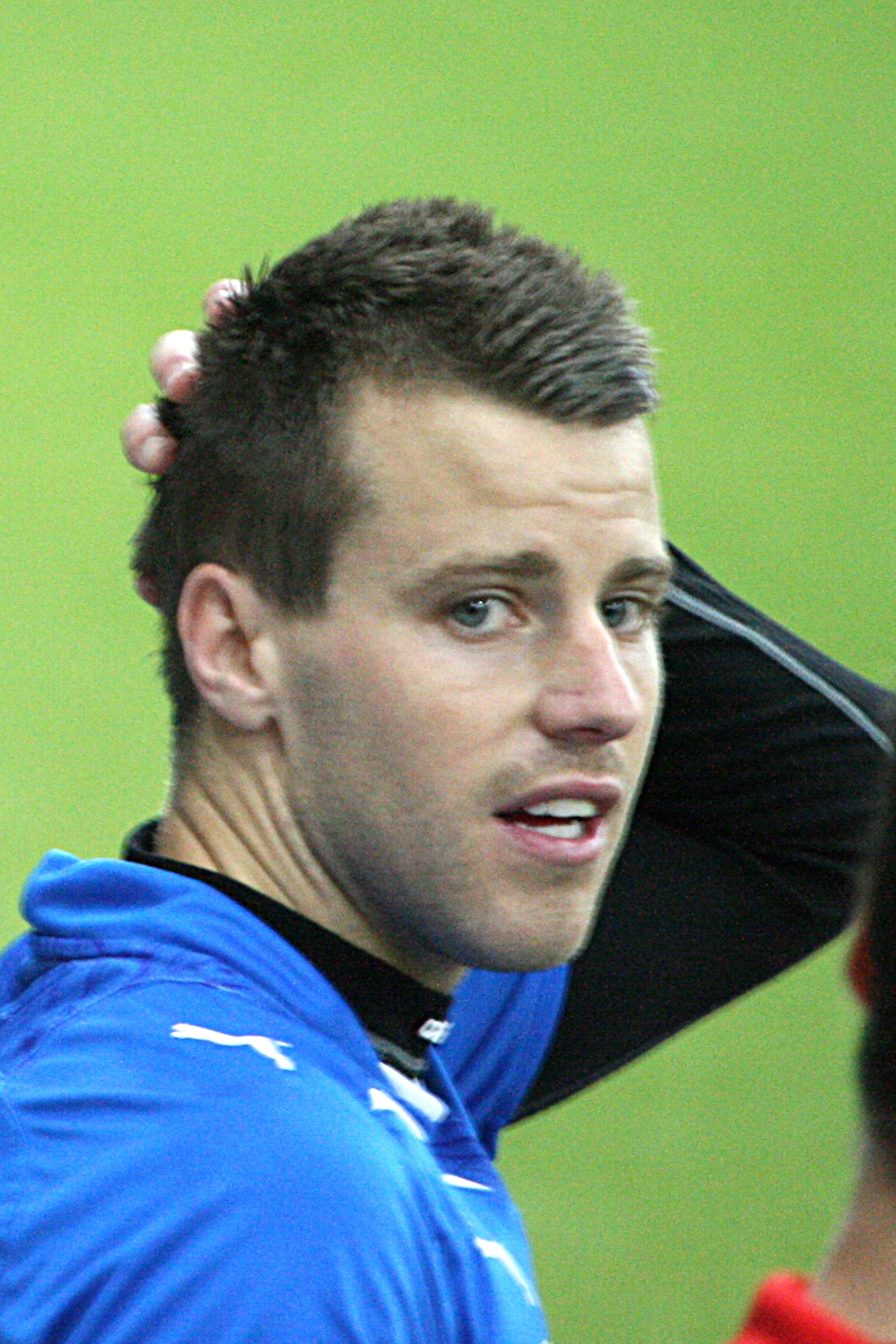
- Farnerud in February 2009

Personal information
- Full name: Hans Pontus Farnerud
- Date of birth: 4 June 1980 (age 46)
- Place of birth: Helsingborg, Sweden
- Height: 1.80 m (5 ft 11 in)
- Position: Midfielder

Youth career
- –1996: Landskrona BoIS

Senior career*
Years	Team	Apps	(Gls)
1996–1998	Landskrona BoIS	55	(14)
1998–2003	Monaco B	17	(4)
1998–2005	Monaco	94	(5)
2003–2004	→ Strasbourg (loan)	30	(0)
2005–2006	Strasbourg	32	(3)
2006–2008	Sporting CP	23	(0)
2008–2011	Stabæk	88	(8)
2012–2013	IFK Göteborg	49	(5)
2014	Glumslövs FF	1	(0)
2018–2020	Öjersjö IF	3	(1)
Total		382	(40)

International career
1996–1997	Sweden U16	10	(1)
1998–1999	Sweden U18	20	(2)
2000–2001	Sweden U21	14	(6)
2002–2010	Sweden	11	(0)
- * Club domestic league appearances and goals

Hans Pontus Farnerud (born 4 June 1980) is a Swedish former professional footballer who played as a midfielder. Starting off his professional career with Landskrona BoIS in the late 1990s, he went on to represent Monaco, Strasbourg, Sporting, and Stabaek before finishing up his career at IFK Göteborg in 2013. He won 11 caps for the Sweden national team between 2002 and 2010 and was a squad player for his country at the 2002 FIFA World Cup and UEFA Euro 2004.

== Club career ==
Farnerud was born in Helsingborg, and grew up in Landskrona. During his youth he was also a promising hockey player, playing with Malmö Redhawks. After starting professionally at 16 with Landskrona BoIS, he was acquired in 1999 by French club AS Monaco FC, and appeared in 15 Ligue 1 matches as the team won the 2000 national title; after spending the 2003–04 season on loan to fellow league side Strasbourg he returned, playing six games in the UEFA Champions League and scoring once in the league, after only one minute on the pitch for a 2–1 home win against FC Nantes.

In June 2005, Farnerud was bought definitely by Strasbourg, reuniting with younger brother Alexander. The pair (with Pontus only missing six league contests) could not prevent a final relegation, as second from the bottom.

Afterwards, Farnerud moved to Sporting CP on a free transfer, being scarcely used during his two-year stint in Portugal. He then returned north to Norway, signing a long-term contract with Stabæk Fotball on 23 July 2008. He helped to a national championship in his debut campaign, eventually being named team captain.

Farnerud spent his two last seasons as a professional back in his homeland, with IFK Göteborg. In late 2013, he retired from the game due to a recurrent hip injury, but returned the following year with amateurs Glumslövs FF (seventh division).

In May 2019, it was announced that Farnerud would take the position as assistant director of football at Göteborg.

== International career ==
Farnerud was a Swedish international from 13 February 2002 to 23 January 2010, making his debut in a 2–2 friendly away draw against Greece where he featured 29 minutes. He was a participant at the 2002 FIFA World Cup and UEFA Euro 2004, but did not leave the bench on either occasion.

== Personal life ==
Farnerud's younger brother, Alexander, is also a footballer. He too is a midfielder and former Swedish international. Farnerud's son Colin Farnerud has played for the Sweden national youth football team.

After retiring, Farnerud worked as a French League pundit for the TV company C More Entertainment.

== Career statistics ==
=== International ===
Appearances and goals by national team and year
National team	Year	Apps	Goals
Sweden	2002	2	0
Sweden	2003	4	0
Sweden	2004	3	0
Sweden	2005	0	0
Sweden	2006	0	0
Sweden	2007	0	0
Sweden	2008	0	0
Sweden	2009	0	0
Sweden	2010	2	0
Total		11	0

== Honours ==
Monaco

- Ligue 1: 1999–2000
- Coupe de la Ligue: 2002–03
- Trophée des Champions: 2000

Sporting

- Taça de Portugal: 2006–07, 2007–08
- Supertaça Cândido de Oliveira: 2007

Stabæk

- Tippeligaen: 2008
- Superfinalen: 2009

IFK Göteborg

- Svenska Cupen: 2012–13
