= Arsim Gashi =

Swedish footballer

Personal information
- Date of birth: 6 December 1983 (age 42)
- Place of birth: Sweden
- Height: 1.89 m (6 ft 2 in)
- Position: Forward

Youth career
- Västerviks FF

Senior career*
Years	Team	Apps	(Gls)
2004–2005	Åtvidabergs FF	37	(6)
2005–2006	FC Anker Wismar	9	(1)
2007–2008	Motala AIF		(30)
2009–2010	IFK Mariehamn	21	(1)
2010	IF Sylvia		(3)
2011	Motala AIF	10	(3)
2011	IK Sleipner	6	(0)
2012–	Assyriska IF		
- * Club domestic league appearances and goals as of 28 October 2012

Arsim Gashi (born 6 December 1983) is a Swedish footballer currently playing for Assyriska IF.
