= Jönköpings Södra IF =

Swedish football club

- Full name: Jönköping Södra; Idrottsförening
- Short name: J-Södra
- Founded: 9 December 1922; 103 years ago
- Ground: Stadsparksvallen, Jönköping
- Capacity: 7,300
- Chairman: Ingo Deters (acting)
- Manager: Christer Persson
- League: Ettan
- 2026: Ettan Södra (9th of 16)
- Website: jonkopingssodra.se
Home colours	Away colours

Jönköpings Södra Idrottsförening, more commonly known as Jönköpings Södra IF or J-Södra, is a Swedish football club based in Jönköping. The club, founded in 1922, currently play in the third tier of swedish football. J-Södra has played a total of twelve Allsvenskan seasons previously, with the most successful finish being runner-up in 1950 and their last spell ending in 2017.

The club is affiliated to the Smålands Fotbollförbund and play their home games at Stadsparksvallen.

== History ==
=== Founding and early years ===
Jönköpings Södra IF was founded on 9 December 1922 with Bandy being the first sport where the club fielded a team. Other sports that were played by the club in its early days includes Boxing, Ice hockey, Tennis and Table tennis. In 1923 they played their first football match, which only featured eight players for each side as they did not have access to a big enough pitch to fit more players. Five years later J-Södra finally entered into league play for the first time as well as the district championship.

=== First Allsvenskan era and decline ===
A 1948–49 Allsvenskan away game against Örebro SK.

J-Södra team photo from 1959.

The club's first major success came during the 44–45 season. It was only their second year ever in the second tier of the Swedish football league system, but J-Södra managed to go through the season winning all 18 league games as well as the promotion playoffs, thus qualifying themselves for the top division Allsvenskan for the first time ever. Even though they were relegated the following season they immediately bounced back up to Allsvenskan again and the golden age of the club began as they established themselves in the top division throughout the late 1940s and early 1950s. With the culmination being the second-place finish in the 1949–50 Allsvenskan behind a dominant Malmö FF.

After their relegation in 1954 J-södra only managed two short one year appearances in Allsvenskan during the sixties. They instead became established in the second tier until the late 1980s when the club started plummeting down the divisions and eventually bottoming out in 1996 when they finished in 8th place in the fifth tier of Swedish football.

=== Recent years ===
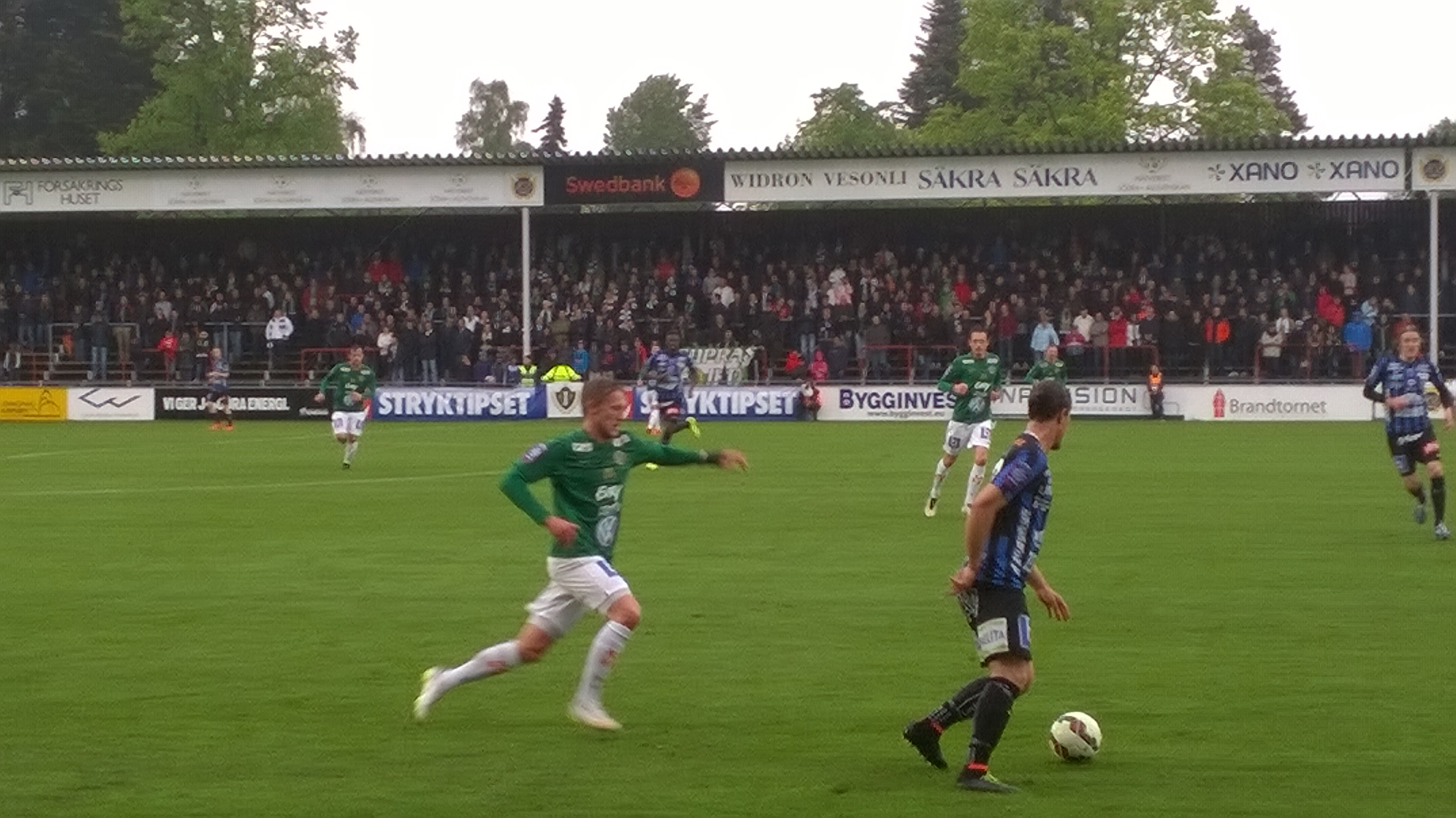
J-Södra playing at home against IK Sirius in the 2015 Superettan.

In 2003 the club had returned to the third tier and at the start of the season they announced the high-profile signing of former Sweden men's national football team coach Olle Nordin as their new manager. During his reign he helped the club advance to, and establish themselves in, Superettan and he eventually also took over the role of director of sports. The 2014 Superettan season started in chaos as manager Mats Gren abruptly left to work for IFK Göteborg. After feeling unhappy with the list of managers that the board was considering the player squad declared that they wanted inexperienced youth coach Jimmy Thelin as their new manager. The board accepted the players proposal and during his second year in charge Thelin won promotion back to Allsvenskan with the club.

After the relegation from Allsvenskan, the club has established itself as a stable club in the Superettan.

After many changes and a rough year the club was relegated to Söderettan, in November 2023.

== Kit ==
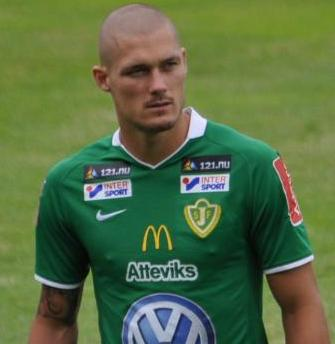
Pär Cederqvist wearing the clubs green home shirt in 2011.

Jönköpings Södra play their home games in green shirts with white shorts and socks.

Puma has been their kit supplier since 2020.

Period	Kit manufacturer	Shirt sponsor (chest)
2009	(United States) Nike	McDonald's
2010–2019	(United States) Nike	Volkswagen
2020–2022	(Germany) Puma	Volkswagen
2023	(Germany) Puma	Holmgrens Bil
2024	(Germany) Puma	–
2025–	(Germany) Puma	Aqua

== Recent seasons ==
Summary of the ten most recent seasons for Jönköpings Södra IF:

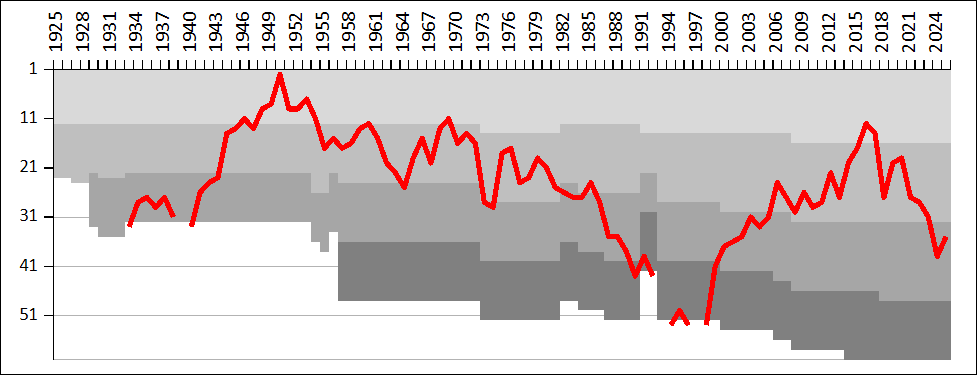
A chart showing the progress of Jönköpings Södra through the swedish football league system. The different shades of gray represent league divisions.

Season	Division	Tier	Pos	Pl	W	D	L	+	-	P	Cup	Attendances
2016	Allsvenskan	1	12	30	8	11	11	32	39	35	2nd round	4,972
2017	Allsvenskan	1	↓ 14	30	6	12	12	31	46	30	Group stage	4,301
2018	Superettan	2	11	30	9	8	13	31	38	35	Group stage	2,289
2019	Superettan	2	4	30	15	7	8	52	31	52	Group stage	2,664
2020	Superettan	2	3	30	18	5	7	52	34	59	2nd round	0
2021	Superettan	2	11	30	10	8	12	34	37	38	2nd round	864
2022	Superettan	2	12	30	9	9	12	41	51	36	Group stage	2,332
2023	Superettan	2	↓ 15	30	7	10	13	43	57	31	2nd round	2,527
2024	Ettan	3	7	30	12	8	10	42	40	44	2nd round	1,276
2025	Ettan	3	3	30	19	5	6	41	22	62	–	2,010

== Stadium ==
Jönköpings Södra play their home games at Stadsparksvallen which is located at the top of a hill overlooking the city of Jönköping and lake Vättern. The 7,300 capacity stadium was originally built in 1902 but has undergone two major renovations in 1927 and 2020. Up until the early 1980s the stadium also hosted athletics competitions and has been used as the home venue for the Sweden women's national football team.

The main stand of Stadsparkvallen in 1959.

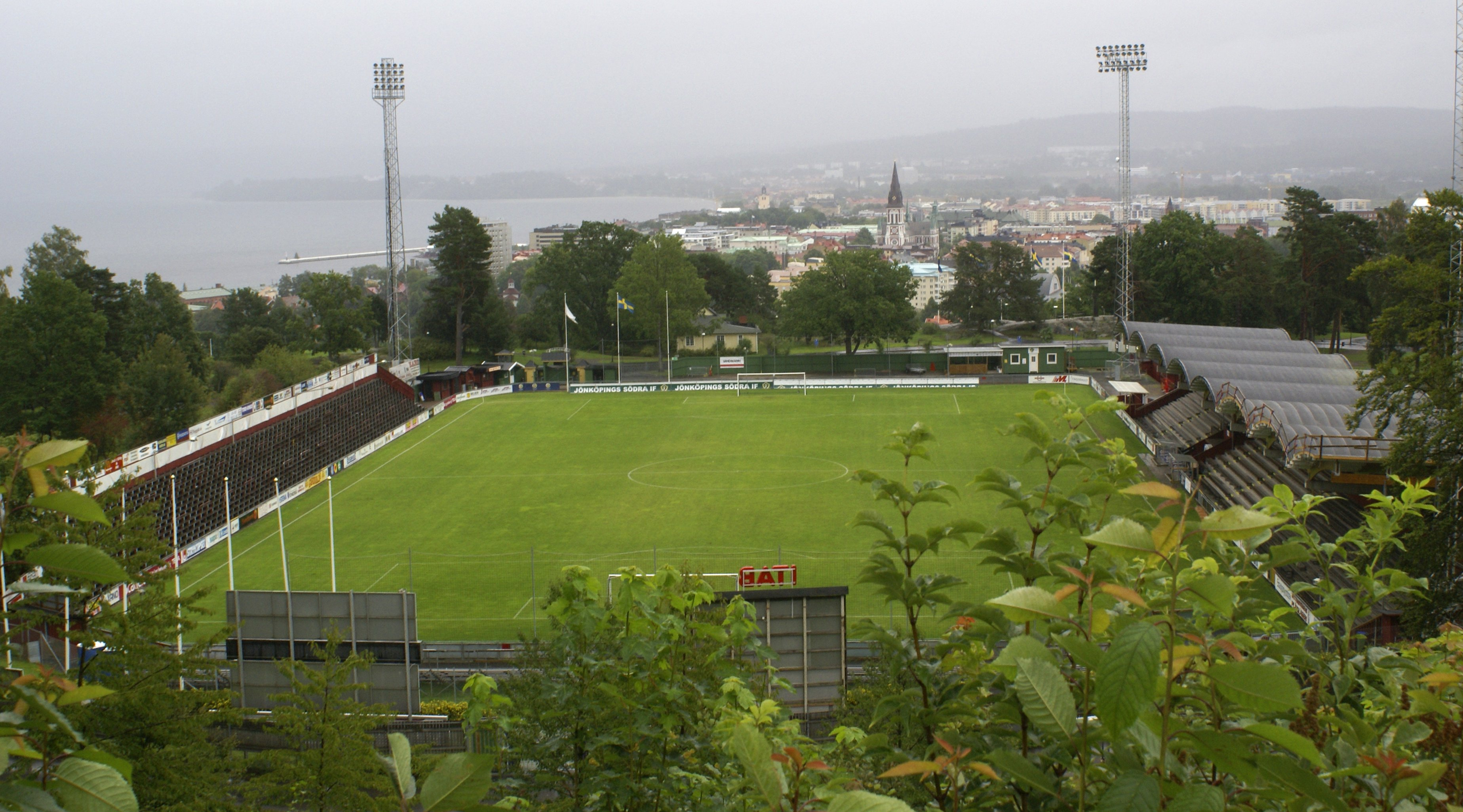
Overhead view from 2008, before the most recent renovations.

The old stand in 2023.

== Players ==
As of 15 August 2026

Note: Flags indicate national team as defined under FIFA eligibility rules; some limited exceptions apply. Players may hold more than one non-FIFA nationality.

No.	Pos.	Nation	Player
1	GK	SWE	Alexander Eriksson
2	DF	SWE	Lukas Eek
3	DF	SWE	Arvid Eriksson
4	DF	SWE	Andreas Carlsson
6	DF	SWE	Sebastian Crona
7	FW	SWE	Faiz Benatallah
8	MF	SWE	Alex Khoshaba
9	FW	SWE	Linus Lyck
10	MF	SWE	Dženis Kozica
11	FW	SWE	Anmar Kiwarkis
12	MF	SWE	Klevis Galabri
13	DF	SWE	Hugo Lyck
14	MF	SWE	Christoffer Hellström

No.	Pos.	Nation	Player
15	FW	SWE	Ville Hellgård Knudsen
17	DF	SWE	Olle Almström
18	MF	SWE	Jonathan Drott
20	FW	EST	Ramol Sillamaa
21	MF	SWE	Colin Farnerud
22	FW	SWE	Marokhy Ndione
24	MF	SWE	Romeo Andersson
25	DF	SWE	Elias Boulos
26	FW	SWE	Petrus Kocadag
27	MF	SWE	Karl Särbring
28	FW	SWE	Jacob Shamoun
30	GK	SWE	Simon Svensson

=== Out on loan ===
Note: Flags indicate national team as defined under FIFA eligibility rules; some limited exceptions apply. Players may hold more than one non-FIFA nationality.

No.	Pos.	Nation	Player
-	FW	SWE	Hampus Israelsson (to Husqvarna FF until 31 December 2026)
-	MF	SWE	Milian Sipos (to Assyriska IK until 31 December 2026)

=== Notable players ===
These players were either in the top ten of the newspaper Jönköpings-Posten article about the best J-Södra players of the millenium or listed on the clubs website under the "legends and heroes" section.

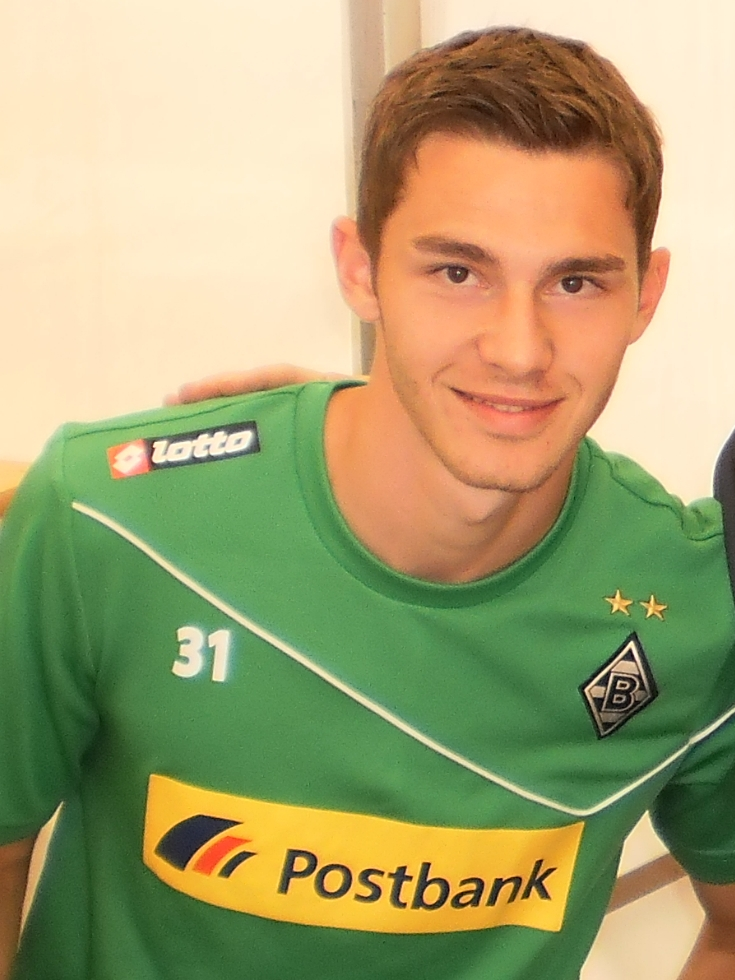
Forward Branimir Hrgota went on to have a long club career in Germany after leaving J-Södra.

Name	Years
(Sweden) Tommy Thelin	2007–2019
(Northern Ireland) Daryl Smylie	2009–2019
(Armenia) André Calisir	2011–2017
(Sweden) Robert Gojani	2011–2017
(Sweden) Branimir Hrgota	2011–2012
(Sweden) Viktor Rönneklev	2012–2016
(Sweden) Pawel Cibicki	2016
(Sweden) Fredric Fendrich	2004–2022
(Sweden) Erik Skördåker	2000–2008
(Sweden) Anton Cajtoft	2013–2020
(Sweden) Jesper Svensson	2009–2021
(Sweden) Tom Siwe	2008–2019

== Management ==
=== Technical staff ===
As of 29 October 2026

Name	Role
(Sweden) Dennis Jalmarsson	Sports director
(Sweden) Christer Persson	Head coach
(Sweden) Elias Ibrahim	Assistant coach
(Sweden) (Bosnia and Herzegovina) Zoran Lukic	Assistant coach
(Belarus) Pilip Vaitsiakhovich	Goalkeeping coach
(Sweden) Johan Ibrahim	Analyst
(Sweden) Arvid Strand	Physiotherapist
(Sweden) Isak Öhrvall	Physiotherapist
(Sweden) John Ahlström	Mental coach

=== Managerial history ===
- (Sweden) Gunnar Gren (1941–42)
- (Sweden) Birger Möller (1942–43)
- (Sweden) Sölve Flisberg (1944)
- (Denmark) Eigil Nielsen (1945)
- (Austria) Otto Cinadler (1945)
- (Sweden) Knut Holmgren (1946–48)
- (Sweden) Gerhard Thorsell (1949–51)
- (Austria) Josef Stroh (1951–53)
- (Sweden) Gerhard Thorsell (1953–59)
- (Sweden) Olle Eriksson (1960)
- (Czech Republic) Vilém Lugr (1961–62)
- (Sweden) Per-Olof Johansson (1963–64)
- (Austria) Josef Stroh (1965)
- (Sweden) Per-Olof Johansson (1966–67)
- (Sweden) Stig Sundqvist (1968–71)
- (Sweden) Jan Karlsson (1972)
- (Sweden) Stig Sundqvist (1973)
- (Sweden) Ingvar Svensson (1974–76)
- (Sweden) Max Möller (1977)
- (Sweden) Bo Axberg (1978–80)
- (Sweden) Weine Wallinder (1981)
- (Sweden) Sonny Nordqvist (1981–83)
- (Sweden) Roger Johansson (1984–85)
- (Sweden) Sven Andersson (1986)
- (Sweden) Max Möller (1987–88)
- (Sweden) Bo Axberg (1989–91)
- (Sweden) Sonny Nordqvist (1992)
- (Sweden) Bo Andersson (1992–93)
- (Sweden) Ola Henriksson (1993–94)
- (Sweden) Jan Karlsson (1995)
- (Sweden) Jörgen Augustsson (1996)
- (Sweden) Sonny Nordqvist (1997)
- (England) Giles Stille (1998–99)
- (Sweden) Per-Åke Knutsson (2000–01)
- (England) Peter Churchill (2002)
- (Sweden) Thomas Ek (2002)
- (Sweden) Olle Nordin (2003–07)
- (Sweden) Thomas Ek (2008)
- (Sweden) Olle Nordin (2008–09)
- (Sweden) Andreas Jankevics (2010)
- (Sweden) Hans Lindbom (2010–11)
- (Sweden) Mats Gren (2012–13)
- (Sweden) Jimmy Thelin (2014–17)
- (Sweden) Jörgen Wålemark (2018)
- (Sweden) Stefan Jörgensen (2018)
- (Sweden) Andreas Brännström (2018–2020)
- (Sweden) Patric Jildefalk (2021–2022)
- (Spain) Oscar Garcia Rodriguez (2022)
- (Sweden) Niclas Tagesson (2022)
- (Spain) Andrés García (2023)
- (Sweden) Charbel Abraham (2023)
- (Sweden) Niclas Tagesson (2023)
- (Sweden) Patrik Ingelsten (2024–2025)
- (Sweden) Daniel Culha (2026)
- (Sweden) Christer Persson (2026-)

== Honours ==
- Allsvenskan
  - Runners-up: 1949–50
- Superettan
  - Winners: 2015
