= Sweden national football team =

Sweden national football team might refer to:

- Sweden men's national football team
- Sweden women's national football team
