= Alexander Angelin =

Swedish footballer (born 1990)

Personal information
- Date of birth: 30 January 1990 (age 36)
- Place of birth: Gothenburg, Sweden
- Height: 1.85 m (6 ft 1 in)
- Position: Left-back

Youth career
- Västra Frölunda

Senior career*
Years	Team	Apps	(Gls)
2008–2011	Västra Frölunda	72	(13)
2011–2012	GAIS	4	(0)
2012	→ Utsiktens BK (loan)	8	(1)
2013–2017	Utsiktens BK	74	(12)
2018	BK Häcken	2	(0)
2018–2019	GAIS	22	(0)
2020–2021	Utsiktens BK	51	(5)
2022	Västra Frölunda	3	(0)
Total		236	(31)
- * Club domestic league appearances and goals

Alexander Angelin (born 30 January 1990) is a Swedish former professional footballer who played as a left-back.

== Club career ==
In 2013, Angelin signed for Utsiktens BK.

On 8 March 2022, Angelin returned to Västra Frölunda.
