= Sweden national youth football team =

The Sweden national youth football teams are a group of four teams that represents Sweden in association football at various specific age levels, ranging from under-17 to under-21. All of the teams are controlled by Swedish Football Association, the governing body for football in Sweden.

The four teams are the following:

- Sweden national under-21 football team
- Sweden national under-20 football team (Only plays in the FIFA U-20 World Cup)
- Sweden men's national under-19 football team
- Sweden men's national under-17 football team

== See also ==
- Sweden national football teams
