= Axel Elveljung =

Swedish footballer

Personal information
- Full name: Erik Axel Rickard Elveljung
- Date of birth: 6 March 1989 (age 37)
- Place of birth: Sweden
- Height: 1.84 m (6 ft 1/2 in)
- Position: Striker

Team information
- Current team: Rasbo IK
- Number: 6

Youth career
- Bjärreds IF
- –2002: IK Frej
- 2003–2006: IF Brommapojkarna

Senior career*
| Years | Team | Apps | (Gls) |
| 2006–2008 | IF Brommapojkarna | 2 | (0) |
| 2008–2010 | Östers IF | 26 | (3) |
| 2008 | → Gröndals IK (loan) | 6 | (1) |
| 2010 | → Västerås SK (loan) | 15 | (3) |
| 2011–2012 | Skiljebo SK | 43 | (26) |
| 2013 | Västerås SK | 8 | (1) |
| 2013–2016 | Skiljebo SK | 72 | (26) |
| 2017 | IK Franke | 7 | (2) |
| 2018–2020 | Irsta IF | 46 | (33) |
| 2021– | Rasbo IK | 26 | (16) |

International career
| 2004–2006 | Sweden U17 | 17 | (5) |
| 2007 | Sweden U19 | 7 | (3) |
- * Club domestic league appearances and goals

Erik Axel Rickard Elveljung (born Erik Axel Rickard Johansson; 6 March 1989) is a Swedish footballer who plays as a striker for Rasbo IK. He has previously played for IF Brommapojkarna and Östers IF, as well as represented the Sweden U17 and U19 teams.
