= Ersboda SK =

Swedish football team

- Full name: Ersboda Sportklubb
- Founded: 1986
- Dissolved: 2010
- Ground: Ersängsvallen, Umeå
- Capacity: 2,000
- League: Division 2 Norrland
- 2010: Division 2 Norrland, 8th
Home colours	Away colours

Ersboda SK is a Swedish football team from Ersboda in Umeå Municipality. In 2010 they were playing in Division 2 Norrland after relegation from Division 1 Norra in 2008. In the 2017 season, the club is competing in the Division 5 Södra.

== Season to season ==
Season	Level	Division	Section	Position	Movements
1999	Tier 6	Division 5	Västerbotten Södra	1st	Promoted
2000	Tier 5	Division 4	Västerbotten Södra	9th	
2001	Tier 5	Division 4	Västerbotten Södra	6th	
2002	Tier 5	Division 4	Västerbotten Södra	2nd	
2003	Tier 5	Division 4	Västerbotten Södra	1st	Promoted
2004	Tier 4	Division 3	Mellersta Norrland	3rd	
2005	Tier 4	Division 3	Mellersta Norrland	1st	Promoted
2006*	Tier 4	Division 2	Norrland	3rd	
2007	Tier 4	Division 2	Norrland	1st	Promoted
2008	Tier 3	Division 1	Norra	12th	Relegated
2009	Tier 4	Division 2	Norrland	3rd	
2010	Tier 4	Division 2	Norrland	8th	

* League restructuring in 2006 resulted in a new division being created at Tier 3 and subsequent divisions dropping a level.

== Attendances ==
In recent seasons Ersboda SK have had the following average attendances:

Season	Average attendance	Division / Section	Level
2005	209	Div 3 Mellersta Norrland	Tier 4
2006	300	Div 2 Norrland	Tier 4
2007	316	Div 2 Norrland	Tier 4
2008	441	Div 1 Norra	Tier 3
2009	218	Div 2 Norrland	Tier 4
2010	211	Div 2 Norrland	Tier 4

* Attendances are provided in the Publikliga sections of the Svenska Fotbollförbundet website.
