= Motala AIF =

Swedish football club

- Full name: Motala Allmänna Idrottsförening Fotbollsklubb
- Nickname(s): Maif
- Founded: 1907; 118 years ago
- Ground: Motala Idrottspark, Sweden, Motala
- Capacity: 8,500
- Manager: Agim Hasani
- League: Division 1 Södra
- 2019: Division 2 Södra Svealand, 2nd (Promotion Playoffs - Not Promoted)
- Website: www.maif.org
Home colours	Away colours

Motala AIF is a Swedish football club located in Motala in Östergötland. Other sports that the club promotes include athletics, orienteering, ice hockey, road cycling, and skiing.

== Background ==
Since their foundation on 29 August 1907 Motala AIF has participated mainly in the upper and middle divisions of the Swedish football league system. The highlight was in 1957/1958 when the club played one season in the Allsvenskan. During this season MAIF's attendance record was broken when 13,058 spectators watched the match with Örgryte IS. In more recent years a source of pride was when MAIF played in the second tier Superettan in the 2001 season. However, in total the club has actually played 25 seasons in the Swedish second tier. The club currently plays in Division 1 Södra which is the third tier of Swedish football. They play their home matches at the Idrottsparken Motala.

Motala AIF are affiliated to the Östergötlands Fotbollförbund.

== Season to season ==
Season	Level	Division	Section	Position	Movements
1993	Tier 3	Division 2	Östra Götaland	3rd	
1994	Tier 3	Division 2	Östra Götaland	3rd	
1995	Tier 3	Division 2	Östra Götaland	2nd	Promotion Playoffs – Promoted
1996	Tier 2	Division 1	Södra	9th	
1997	Tier 2	Division 1	Södra	8th	
1998	Tier 2	Division 1	Södra	10th	
1999	Tier 2	Division 1	Södra	13th	Relegated
2000	Tier 3	Division 2	Östra Götaland	1st	Promotion Playoffs – Promoted
2001	Tier 2	Superettan		16th	Relegated
2002	Tier 3	Division 2	Östra Götaland	9th	
2003	Tier 3	Division 2	Östra Götaland	12th	Relegated
2004	Tier 4	Division 3	Nordöstra Götaland	3rd	
2005	Tier 4	Division 3	Nordöstra Götaland	1st	Promoted
2006*	Tier 4	Division 2	Mellersta Götaland	4th	
2007	Tier 4	Division 2	Mellersta Götaland	1st	Promoted
2008	Tier 3	Division 1	Södra	6th	
2009	Tier 3	Division 1	Södra	12th	Relegated
2010	Tier 4	Division 2	Östra Götaland	1st	Promoted
2011	Tier 3	Division 1	Södra	14th	Relegated
2012	Tier 4	Division 2	Östra Götaland	4th	
2013	Tier 4	Division 2	Södra Svealand	1st	Promoted
2014	Tier 3	Division 1	Södra	4th	
2015	Tier 3	Division 1	Norra	14th	Relegated
2016	Tier 4	Division 2	Södra Svealand	9th	
2017	Tier 4	Division 2	Södra Svealand	5th	
2018	Tier 4	Division 2	Södra Svealand	4th	
2019	Tier 4	Division 2	Södra Svealand	2nd	Promotion Playoffs - Promoted
2020	Tier 3	Division 1	Södra	12th	

- League restructuring in 2006 resulted in a new division being created at Tier 3 and subsequent divisions dropping a level.

== Current squad ==
As of 10 September 2023

Note: Flags indicate national team as defined under FIFA eligibility rules; some limited exceptions apply. Players may hold more than one non-FIFA nationality.

No.	Pos.	Nation	Player
3	DF	(Sweden) SWE	Lukas Eek
4	DF	(Sweden) SWE	Elmar Civgin
5	MF	(Sweden) SWE	Isak Hellgren Villegas
6	DF	(Sweden) SWE	Max Pettersson
7	FW	(Sweden) SWE	Ivan Rako
8	MF	(Sweden) SWE	Liridon Silka
10	MF	(Sweden) SWE	Valon Silka
11	MF	(Sweden) SWE	Kevin Ali
12	DF	(Sweden) SWE	Axel Qvist
14	MF	(Kosovo) KOS	Granit Hana
15	MF	(Sweden) SWE	Adam Kosovic
16	FW	(Lebanon) LBN	Youssef Khaled

No.	Pos.	Nation	Player
17	MF	(Sweden) SWE	Alen Zahirovic (on loan from Östers IF)
18	MF	(Sweden) SWE	Oliver Blomdahl
19	DF	(Sweden) SWE	David Lantz
20	MF	(Sweden) SWE	Abduwahab Adam
21	MF	(Sweden) SWE	Ali Riyadh Majeed Saedi
24	DF	(Sweden) SWE	Tarik Hamza
25	MF	(Sweden) SWE	Simon Karlsson
27	FW	(Sweden) SWE	David Burubwa
30	GK	(Sweden) SWE	Noah Nylander
44	DF	(Sweden) SWE	Albin Ödberg
99	FW	(Sweden) SWE	Majkel Bagir
-	GK	(Sweden) SWE	Gustav Leijon

== Attendances ==
In recent seasons Motala AIF have had the following average attendances:

Season	Average Attendance	Division / Section	Level
2005	279	Div 3 Nordöstra Götaland	Tier 4
2006	250	Div 2 Mellersta Götaland	Tier 4
2007	374	Div 2 Mellersta Götaland	Tier 4
2008	400	Div 1 Södra	Tier 3
2009	395	Div 1 Södra	Tier 3
2010	311	Div 2 Östra Götaland	Tier 4
2011	277	Div 1 Södra	Tier 3
2012	253	Div 2 Östra Götaland	Tier 4
2013	379	Div 2 Södra Svealand	Tier 4
2014	552	Div 1 Södra	Tier 3
2015	397	Div 1 Norra	Tier 3
2016	239	Div 2 Södra Svealand	Tier 4
2017	295	Div 2 Södra Svealand	Tier 4
2018	?	Div 2 Södra Svealand	Tier 4
2019	?	Div 2 Södra Svealand	Tier 4

- Attendances are provided in the Publikliga sections of the Svenska Fotbollförbundet website.
