= History of the Jews in Sweden =

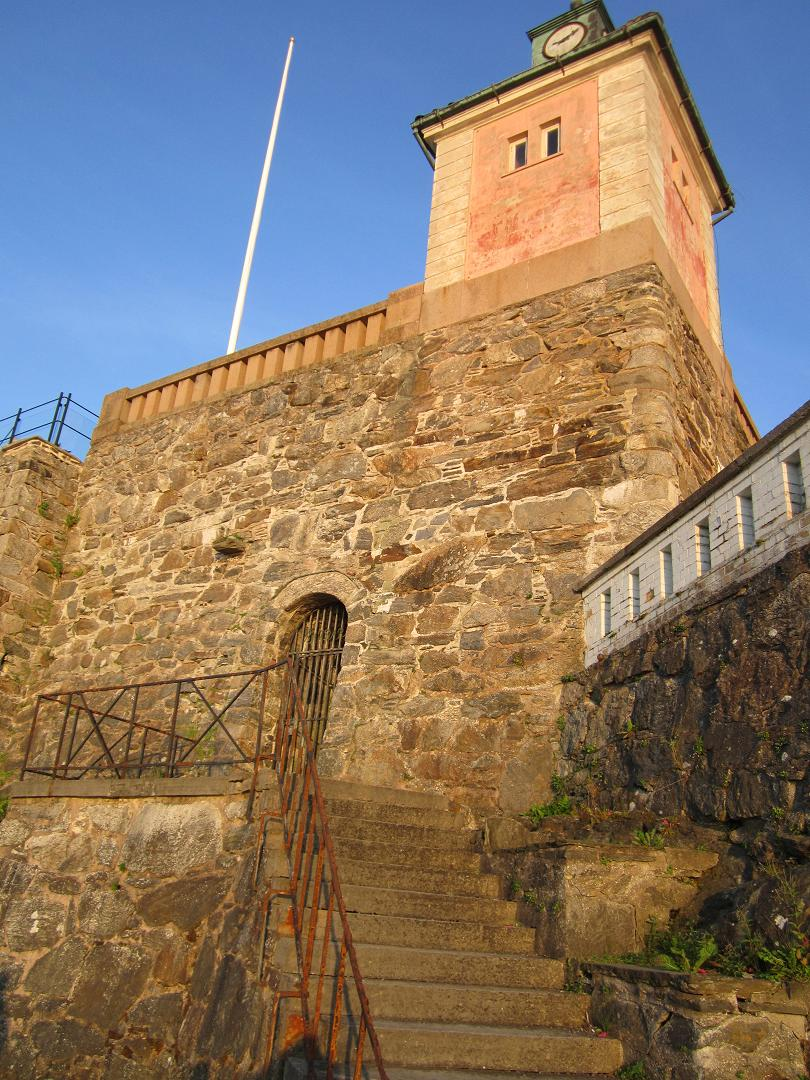
- Fort Fredriksborg in Marstrand contained one of Sweden's first synagogues

Total population
- 15,000

Regions with significant populations
- Stockholm, Gothenburg, Malmö, Helsingborg, Norrköping

Languages
- Swedish, Yiddish, Hebrew

Religion
- Judaism

Related ethnic groups
- other Ashkenazi Jews

The history of Jews in Sweden can be traced from the 17th century, when their presence is verified in the baptism records of the Stockholm Cathedral. Several Jewish families were baptised into the Lutheran Church, a requirement for permission to settle in Sweden. In 1681, for example, 28 members of the families of Israel Mandel and Moses Jacob were baptised in the Stockholm German Church in the presence of King Charles XI of Sweden, the dowager queen Hedvig Eleonora of Holstein-Gottorp, and several other high state officials.

King Charles XII (1697–1718) spent five years with an encampment in the Turkish town of Bender and accumulated a large number of debts there for his entourage. Jewish and Muslim creditors followed him to Sweden, and the Swedish law was altered so that they could hold religious services and circumcise their male children.

== Early history ==
In 1680, the Jews of Stockholm petitioned the king that they be permitted to reside there without abandoning their creed, but the application was denied because the local consistory had refused to endorse it. On 3 December 1685, Charles XI ordered the governor-general of the capital to see to it that no Jews were permitted to settle in Stockholm, or in any other part of the country, "on account of the danger of the eventual influence of the Jewish religion on the pure evangelical faith." In case Jews were found in any Swedish community, they were to be notified to leave within fourteen days.

== Permission to settle ==
Through court patronage Jewish merchants were occasionally appointed royal purveyors. King Charles XII (in Swedish Karl XII) usually had one or more wealthy Jews with him in the field as the paymaster(s) of his army abroad. In 1718, Jews obtained permission to settle in the kingdom without the need to abjure their religion.

Charles XII spent five years in Bender, Bessarabia (at the time a part of the Ottoman Empire) with his army and incurred substantial debts with Jewish and Muslim merchants, who supplied the army with equipment and provisions. On his return, several Muslim and Jewish creditors arrived in Sweden and Swedish law was altered to allow them to hold religious services and circumcise their sons.

After the death of Charles XII in 1718, the Swedish government was financially strained and the royal household was often relieved from pecuniary difficulties by the Jewish merchants of Stockholm who insisted, in exchange, for the granting of additional privileges to themselves and their coreligionists. As a consequence the concession of 1718 was renewed and supplemented by royal edicts of 1727, 1746, and 1748, but permission was restricted to settlement in smaller cities and rural communities. One of the most prominent Jews in Sweden at this time was the convert Lovisa Augusti, who became one of the most popular singers on the stage in Stockholm.

In the 1770s, King Gustav III had allowed Jews to come to Sweden and obtain civil rights without converting, and in 1782 an ordinance was issued (judereglementet) – due particularly to efforts of the prominent Liberal Anders Chydenius – by which Jews were restricted to reside in one of three towns: Stockholm, Gothenburg, and Norrköping. To these was added the town of Karlskrona, as a Jewish merchant, Fabian Philip, had established there a factory for the manufacture of sails and naval uniforms. They were not permitted to trade in markets elsewhere or to own property. Jews were ineligible for government positions and election to Parliament. They were forbidden from converting Lutherans to the Jewish religion.

== Restricted to three cities ==
The government was desirous of attracting wealthy Jews to the country, but it was equally careful to keep out itinerant door-to-door sellers of trinkets, some of whom had in previous years entered Sweden from Germany. Any foreign Jew who landed in Sweden was accordingly required to report, within eight days of his arrival, to the local authorities, and to produce his passport and a certificate of character, as well as a statement of his purpose in coming to the country. These certificates were issued by the elders of the congregation to which the immigrant belonged in his native country and had to be verified by the municipal authorities of the place in which the immigrant had last resided. If the certificates were unsatisfactory, the authorities were at liberty to expel the holder, but in case he was admitted he was directed to Stockholm, Gothenburg, or Norrköping. Jews who were residents of the country prior to the promulgation of this ordinance were called upon to present their certificates of character to the proper authorities, together with a statement setting forth in which city they desired to settle and make their living. The ordinance enumerated the different trades the Jews were permitted to follow, and it stipulated also that they should apprentice their sons to Swedish tradesmen in one of the three cities. In order to prevent the overcrowding of the mercantile field, it was prescribed that no foreign-born Jew should be allowed to start in business unless he possessed at least 2,000 Swedish riksdaler in cash or negotiable securities; a native-born Jew need have only 1,000 riksdaler. Rabbis were exempt, and according to previous ordinances, poor Jews were to be deported from the country.

As to the retail business, the Jews were prohibited from selling victuals, liquor, and drugs, and they were permitted to retail their special articles of food, wine, kosher meat, matzot, etc., among themselves only. Furthermore, the Jewish retail dealer was not permitted to offer his goods for sale in markets outside the city in which he was located (permission was only given to reside in Stockholm, Gothenburg, Karlskrona, and Norrköping) and he was compelled to conduct his business in open shops and was forbidden to peddle from house to house or in the streets.

The Jews were allowed to establish synagogues in the above-mentioned three cities, and to keep rabbis and other clerical officials. Intermarriages between Jews and Christians were forbidden. For every Jewish marriage celebrated a fee of six riksdaler was to be paid to the orphanage of the royal guards, this stipulation being intended as a compensation to the army for the exemption of the Jews from military service. In order to protect the interests of descendants of immigrant Jews the state ordered that, on the death of a Jew, the elders of the congregation should make an inventory of his estate and submit an account thereof, either to the orphans court or to the municipal authorities. The Jews, however, had the right to appoint guardians of minors; and a rabbinical court had jurisdiction in inheritance cases. In litigations between Jews and Christians where the facts could not be established except under oath, the Jew might be ordered to take the customary Jewish oath in the synagogue in the presence of the judge. A Jew convicted of perjury became liable to expulsion from the country.

In 1774, Aaron Isaac moved from Bützow to Stockholm and started work as an engraver of seals, and later moved into haberdashery. The Swedish Riksdag of the Estates gave permission in 1779 to create a synagogue in Stockholm, which Isaac started. He later became a supplier to the Swedish army, especially during the Russo-Swedish war of 1788–1790.

The ordinance of 1782 contained a separate clause referring to "particularly wealthy Jews, or such as are proficient in some trade almost, or quite, unknown in the country". Such persons could, through the Department of Commerce, petition the king for privileges and concessions other than those granted in the general ordinance. Jacob Marcus in Norrköping was granted such privileges and built that city's first synagogue, which opened in 1796. One of his sons-in-law Aron von Reis succeeded in business in Gothenburg. The Jews of Stockholm invited Levi Hirsch from Alt-Strelitz, Mecklenburg, to officiate as their rabbi. The first Swedish synagogue was located at Köpmantorget (Merchants' Square), Stockholm, in the Sjöberg house. After a few years this place was found to be too small, and the Jews in the capital selected the old auction chamber at Tyska Brunn (German Well), where they worshiped until 1870, when the large Stockholm Synagogue was inaugurated at Wahrendorfsgatan (Wahrendorf street). In 1905, the Jewish Encyclopedia reported that there were synagogues in all of the larger Swedish cities in which Jews had settled in any considerable number.

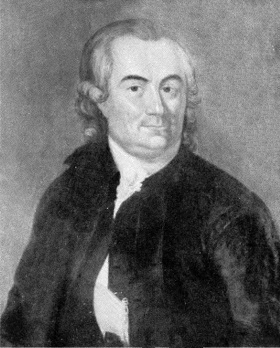
Aaron Isaac of Stockholm

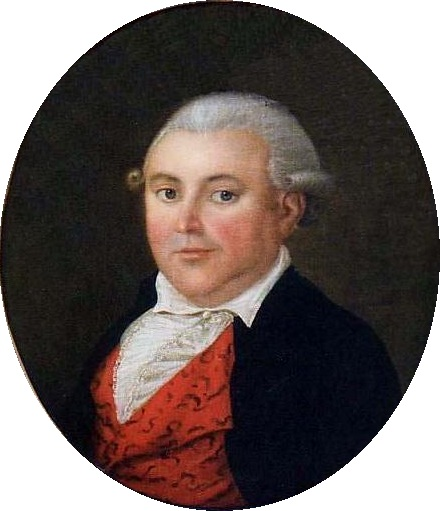
Jacob Marcus of Norrköping

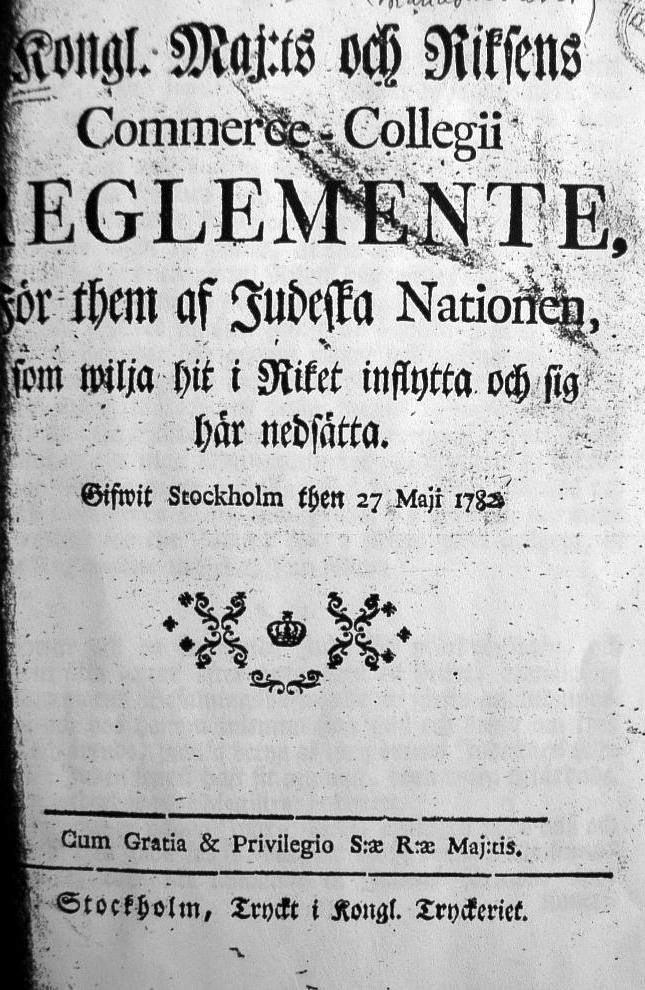
Jewish Ordinance of 1782

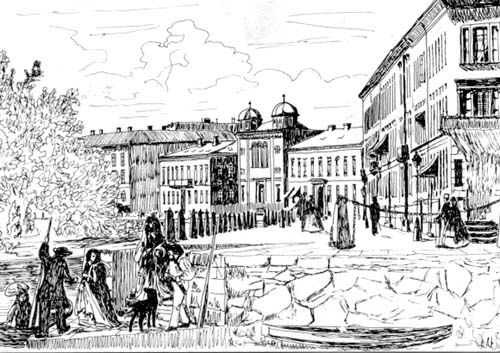
1860 lithograph of Gothenburg Synagogue

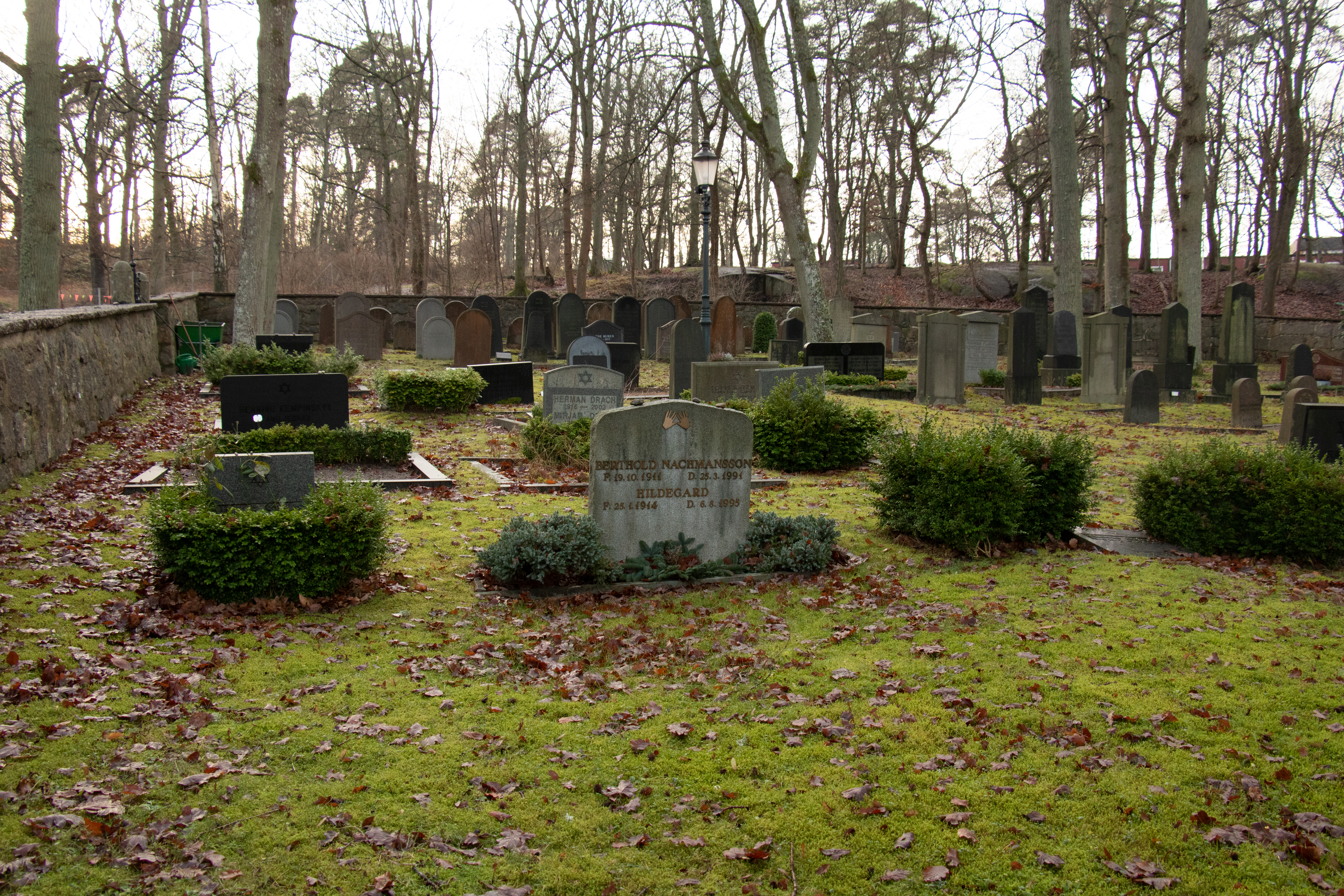
Jewish Cemetery in Karlskrona

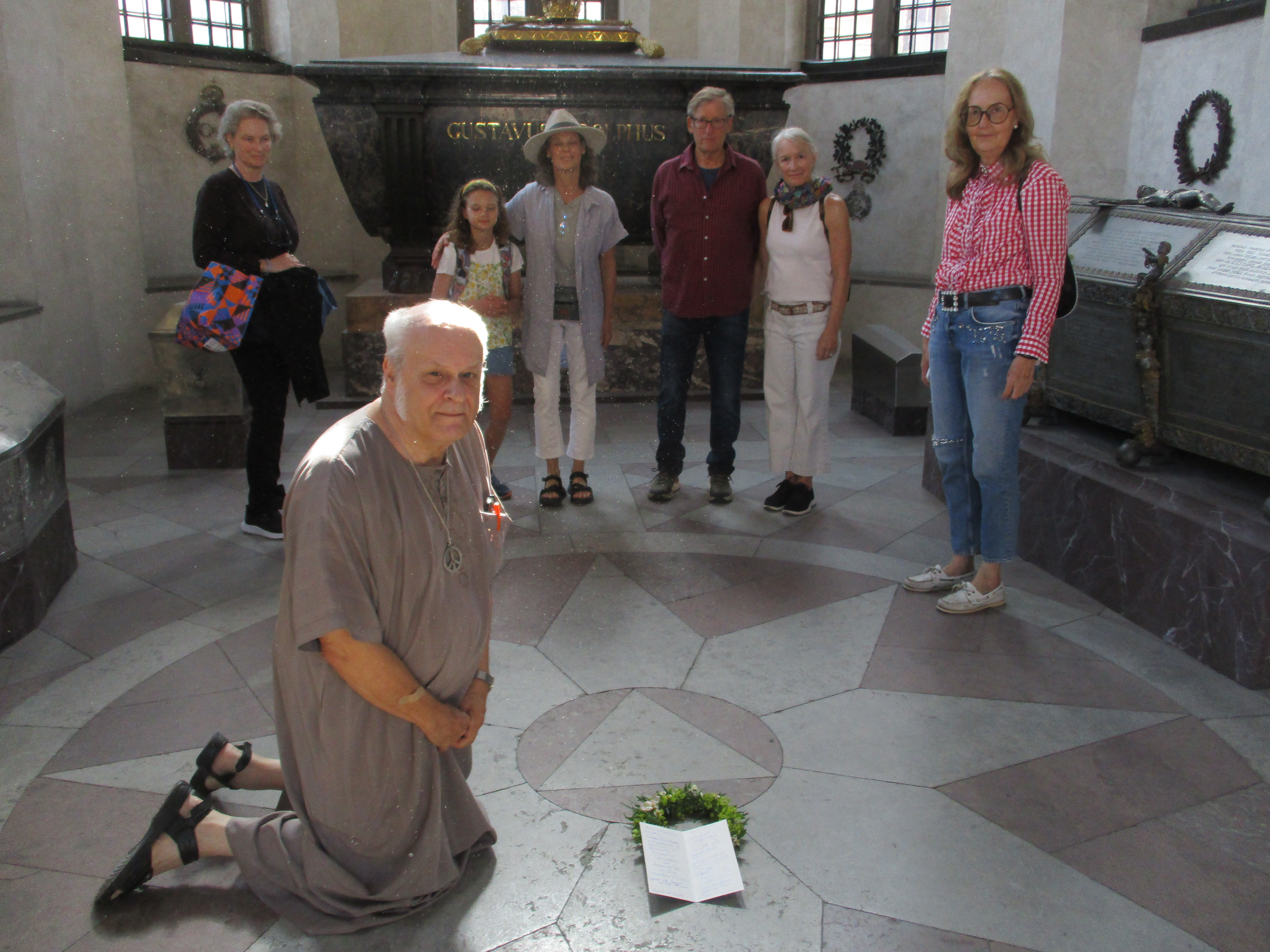
American and Swedish descendants of Jacob Marcus and Aron von Reis honoring Gustav III in 2024

== Reaction to 1838 decree ==
After 1782, Jews gradually secured from the government reductions in restrictions, but many Jews, particularly those living in Stockholm, desired even greater opportunity and desired to not be disadvantaged due to their religion. A feeling of indignation arose among the general population against the ambitious Jews of Stockholm, many of whom were prosperous financiers; the population witnessed a different, small, and disadvantaged community of Jews prosper to a greater extent than the general population. Anger grew at the gap in wealth between Jews and others; such anger reached a height in 1838. After a new ordinance was promulgated which abolished nearly all restrictions upon Jews' civic rights (in this ordinance the Jews were, for the first time, designated Mosaiter, i.e., adherents of the Mosaic faith), a serious uprising took place in the capital, and numerous complaints were presented to the government, denouncing the alleged 'undue preference' shown Jews. On September 21 of the same year the government was compelled to revoke the new ordinance.

During the following years the book-market was deluged by brochures for and against the Mosaiter. This controversy between sympathizers and antagonists of the Jews continued until 1840, when some members of the Estates of Peasants and Burghers inside the Riksdag petitioned the government to re-establish the ordinance of 1782 in its original form. The friends of the Jews tried to show that the petitioners were actuated by religious intolerance, but their adversaries openly declared the question to be one not of religion, but of race. Those whom opposed the Jews in the Riksdag endeavoured to prove that the Jews had greatly abused the rights and privileges granted them in 1782, and that they had done so at the expense and to the detriment of the native Lutheran merchants and tradesmen. The efforts to create anti-Jewish sentiment in the Riksdag were, however, unavailing, and at a later session of that body (1853), when public opinion had turned more in favour of the Jews, they were accorded additional privileges. In 1852, Amalia Assur (1803–1889) became the first female dentist in Sweden.

During the latter half of the 19th century the few remaining disabilities of the Jews were removed. Under the law of October 26, 1860, they were granted the right to acquire real estate in rural communities, whereas they had previously been permitted to own property in the cities only. On January 20, 1863, another ordinance removed the prohibition against intermarriages between Jews and Christians, which were declared to be legal provided they were conducted by due ceremonies. A later ordinance (October 31, 1873) stipulated that the issue of marriages between members of the Swedish state church and Jews should be brought up in the Lutheran faith. If, however, a pact concerning the religion of their future children had been made in writing by the parents before their marriage, and submitted to the clergyman or other authority that performed the marriage ceremony, such agreement should remain valid.

There were, of course, various privileges which the Jews, like any other non-Lutherans, could still not obtain as long as the then current constitution of the Swedish kingdom remained in force. Thus, they could not become members of the cabinet; nor could they, as judges or as members of committees, take part in discussions concerning religious questions. Otherwise they enjoyed the same rights and were subject to the same duties as the Swedish citizens of the Lutheran faith.

According to the statistics of 1890 there were in the entire kingdom of Sweden 3,402 Jews. Since then, however, their number has been considerably augmented, and in 1905 the Jewish Encyclopedia placed the Jewish population at a "conservative estimate" of 4,000.

== 20th century ==
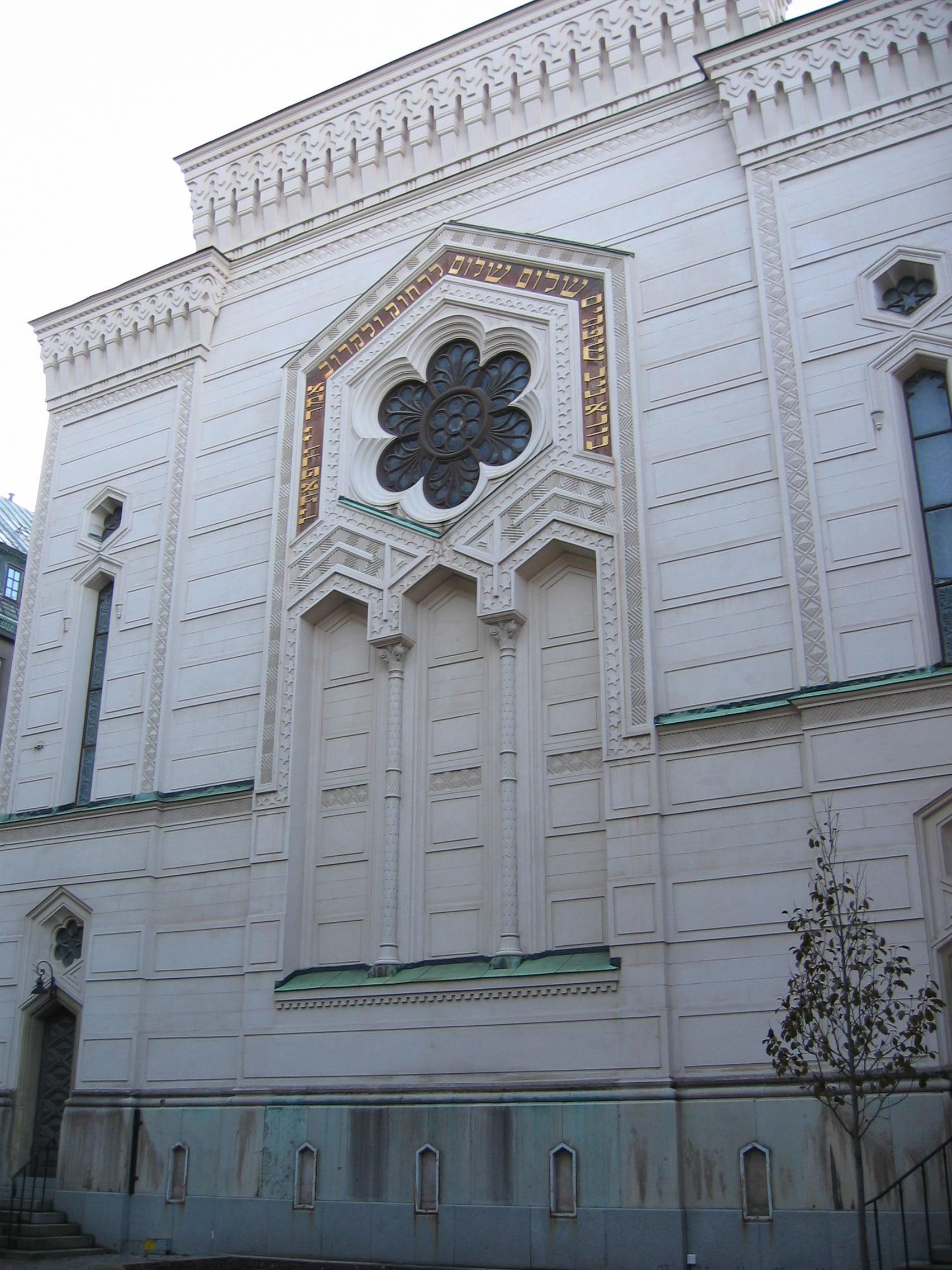
The Stockholm Synagogue

An act that granted Jews equality before the law was passed in the Swedish Riksdag in 1910.

Between 1850 and 1920, there was a large wave of Ashkenazic immigration to Sweden from Russia and Poland, and by 1920, the Jewish population of Sweden had grown to 6,500. After World War I, Jewish immigration was regulated, though small groups of German, Danish, Czech, and Austrian Jewish origin were allowed to come to Sweden.

=== The Holocaust ===
During the pre-war years of Hitler's power (1933 to 1939), some 3,000 Jews migrated to Sweden to escape Nazi persecution. Because Sweden was officially neutral during World War Two, it helped facilitate the rescue of relatively many Jews from Norway and Denmark: in 1942, 900 Norwegian Jews were given asylum from Nazi persecution in their home country, and, most importantly of all, almost the entire Danish Jewish community, some 8,000 people, was transported to Sweden in October 1943 (see Rescue of the Danish Jews). Swedish diplomat Raoul Wallenberg also saved thousands of Hungarian Jews in Budapest by providing them with "protective passports". He also rented thirty-two buildings, funded by the United States, and declared them Swedish diplomatic facilities, thus bringing them under protection of diplomatic immunity.

On the other hand, German companies were allowed to fire Jewish employees in Sweden. Also, Swedish immigration policy during the 1930s was restrictive against admitting Jewish refugees trying to escape the Nazi terror and mass murder into Sweden, before the deportations of Norwegian Jews began in 1942. Jewish refugees may have been discriminated against by the immigration authorities compared to other refugees. At the end of the war and in the post-Holocaust debate Swedish politicians and officials defended their previous restrictive policy toward Jewish immigration by referring to the Jewish minority in the country, claiming that the Stockholm Jewish Community or "certain Jewish circles" had been even more restrictive than the Swedish state.

During the last few weeks of the war and after liberation the Swedish Red Cross undertook a program, known as the White Buses, aimed to rescue Scandinavian concentration camp inmates. After negotiations led by Count Folke Bernadotte some 15,000 inmates were evacuated in the last months of the war – half of them Scandinavians, including 423 Danish Jews. In addition to the White Buses a train with some 2,000 female inmates, 960 of them Jewish, arrived in Padborg, Denmark, on May 2, and then further transported to Copenhagen and Malmö, Sweden.

In the years after World War II, many Jewish refugees from the Baltic countries, Romania and Poland moved to Sweden. Following the war, the Jewish population of Stockholm alone was 7,000 including children. For example, the cartoonist Art Spiegelman was born in Stockholm, where his father Vladek Spiegelman had moved after surviving a concentration camp. In the following decades, more waves of Jewish refugees came from Hungary in 1956 and 1968 who had fled the Communist government. More refugees came then from Poland between 1968 and 1970. Between 1945 and 1970, the Jewish population of Sweden doubled.

One of the last prohibitions against Jews in Sweden – that Jews could not hold political office – was not removed until 1951.

== Contemporary situation ==
=== Contemporary Jewish population of Sweden ===
There is no ethnic registration in Sweden, so the Jewish population can only be roughly estimated. The Official Council of Swedish Jewish Communities' estimation is that about 20,000 pass the halakhic criteria. Of those about 7,000 are members of a congregation. As of 2023, the World Jewish Congress estimated that there are 15,000 Jews in Sweden. There are five Jewish congregations in Sweden: Stockholm (about 4500 members), Gothenburg (about 1000 members), Malmö (about 500 members), Northwest Scania (about 100 members) and Norrköping (formally independent but administered as part of the Stockholm congregation due to its small size). Smaller organized Jewish communities are also found in Uppsala, Lund, Borås and Västerås. Synagogues can be found in Stockholm (which has two Orthodox and one Conservative synagogue), Gothenburg (an Orthodox and a Conservative synagogue), Malmö (an Orthodox and an egalitarian synagogue), Helsingborg (an Orthodox synagogue), and in Norrköping (a Conservative synagogue, although the Norrköping community is too small to perform regular services). The Stockholm community also boasts a primary school, kindergarten, library, a bi-monthly publication (Judisk Krönika) and a weekly Jewish radio program.

=== Reports of increasing antisemitism ===
In October 2010, The Forward reported on the current state of Jews and the level of antisemitism in Sweden. Henrik Bachner, a writer and professor of history at the University of Lund, stated that members of the Swedish Riksdag have attended anti-Israel rallies where the Israeli flag was burned while the flags of Hamas and Hezbollah were waved, and the rhetoric was often antisemitic—not just anti-Israel. Charles Small, former director of the Yale University Initiative for the Study of Antisemitism stated that "Sweden is a microcosm of contemporary antisemitism. It's a form of acquiescence to radical Islam, which is diametrically opposed to everything Sweden stands for." Per Gudmundson, chief editorial writer for Svenska Dagbladet and well known for his pro-Israeli stance for decades, has sharply criticised politicians who he says offer "weak excuses" for Muslims accused of antisemitic crimes. "Politicians say these kids are poor and oppressed, and we have made them hate. They are, in effect, saying that the behaviour of these kids is in some way our fault." Much of the antisemitism in the country has been attributed to the growing Muslim immigrant population.

According to the Swedish National Council for Crime Prevention, in 2012, 66 anti-Jewish hate crimes were reported in Malmö, compared with just 31 in Stockholm. In 2013, 35 such hate crimes were reported in Malmö. These figures show an increase in antisemitic incidents over recent years, a total of 44 incidents were reported in 2010 and 2011 combined.

In 2014, a global ADL study of antisemitism placed Sweden as one of the least antisemitic countries in the world, with only 4% of the population harboring antisemitic attitudes. The 2019 edition of the same study ranked Sweden as the least antisemitic country in the world.

In January 2015, the police in Skåne, the southernmost Swedish county, published a report referring to antisemitism. According to it, there were 137 antisemitic hate crimes in 2013–2014, with half of them occurring in Skåne's biggest city- Malmö, and directed against individual Jews. In February, following shooting attacks that left a filmmaker and a Jewish security guard dead in Copenhagen, Swedish public broadcaster Sveriges Radio asked the Israeli ambassador whether Jews were responsible for antisemitism. They later apologised for the question.

In 2015, the journal Ethnic and Racial Studies published a study conducted between 2003 and 2009 on secondary school students in Sweden. The results showed no significant change in the total level of antisemitism between the two groups of youths (the 2003 and 2009 groups). However, findings showed that among both groups, students born outside of Sweden or whose parents were born outside Sweden displayed higher levels of antisemitism compared to students born in Sweden.

In 2024, The Times of Israel reported that between October 7, 2023, and the end of December, 2023, there were 110 reported antisemitic incidents, over four times as many as the previous year. About 20% contained reference to the Gaza war, blaming individual Swedish Jews for Israel's actions in Gaza. One of these incidents including the burning of an Israeli flag outside of Malmö's only synagogue.

=== Responses to rising antisemitism ===
In 2010, Siavosh Derakhti, Swedish social activist born to Iranian immigrants, founded an organization, Young People Against Anti-Semitism and Xenophobia. He received several awards for his work combating antisemitism.

Sweden has specified a long-term national strategy (2025–2034) meant to strengthen Jewish life and combat antisemitism.

In 2026, the Swedish government proposed allocating additional funds to strengthen security for Jewish institutions, such as schools and synagogues amid rising threats.

=== Situation in Malmö ===
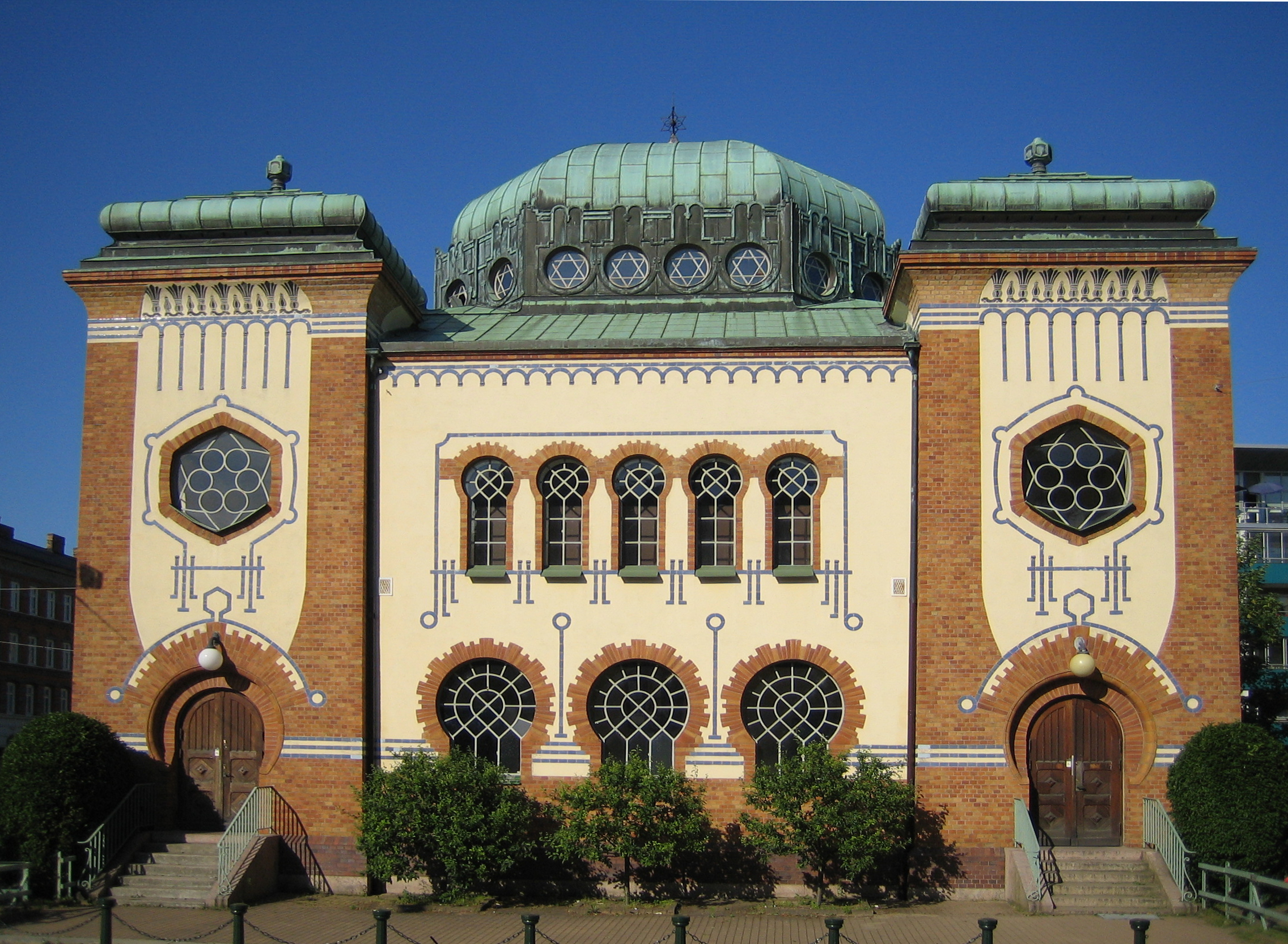
The Malmö Synagogue

In 2010, the international media reported on increasing levels of antisemitic hate-crime in Malmö, the country's third-largest city, in southern Sweden. The reports cited desecrations, the burning of a chapel and worshippers being taunted with 'Hitler' chants. In 2009, the Malmö police received reports of 79 antisemitic incidents, double the number of the previous year (2008). For example, on January 13, 2009, Molotov cocktails were thrown inside and outside the funeral chapel at the old Jewish cemetery in the city of Malmö, in what was seen as an antisemitic act. It was the third time the chapel has been attacked in the few weeks before this incident. On September 28, 2012, an explosion occurred at Malmö Jewish community building, again as what seems to be an antisemitic act. Fredrik Sieradzki, spokesman for the Malmö Jewish community, estimated that the already small Jewish population is shrinking by 5% a year. "Malmö is a place to move away from," he said, citing anti-Semitism as the primary reason.

In an article published in The Forward in October 2010, Judith Popinski, an 86-year-old Holocaust survivor, stated that she is no longer invited to schools that have a large Muslim presence to tell her story of surviving the Holocaust. Popinski, who found refuge in Malmö in 1945, stated that, until recently, she told her story in Malmö schools as part of their Holocaust studies program, but that now, many schools no longer ask Holocaust survivors to tell their stories, because Muslim students treat them with such disrespect, either ignoring the speakers or walking out of the class. She further stated that "Malmö reminds me of the anti-Semitism I felt as a child in Poland before the war. ... I am not safe as a Jew in Sweden anymore."

In July 2014, there were two antisemitic attacks in Malmö: a Jewish man was beaten with iron pipes for hanging the Israeli flag from his window, and some windows in the synagogue of Malmö were broken by stones. Towards the end of 2014 the Rabbi of the Jewish community in Gothenburg received death threats through his e-mail. The letter read: "...But soon will come the time when the Gothenburg synagogue will be destroyed to the ground with you inside, and then you too, you pig, will be killed in the eternal fire". This is the sixth threatening e-mail the rabbi got that year, all from the same anonymous writer.

In November 2023, anti-Israel protestors burned an Israeli flag outside of the Malmö Synagogue, Malmö's only synagogue, while chanting "bomb Israel." The European Jewish Congress stated that "intimidating the Jewish community and blaming them for the events in the Middle East is blatant antisemitism.”

During the lead-up to the 2024 edition of the Eurovision Song Contest hosted in Malmö, the Israeli news outlet Keshet 12 reported an increase of antisemitism in the city. An Israeli National Security Council official advised Jews and Israelis attending the event to hide their identities.

==== Controversy around Ilmar Reepalu ====
Swedish newspapers and political leaders as well as Israeli media have criticised Malmö's then mayor, Ilmar Reepalu (a Social Democrat), for repeatedly "explaining" anti-Jewish incidents as reactions to Israel's policy towards Palestinians.

Reepalu drew criticism in January 2010, for his statements that "We accept neither Zionism nor anti-Semitism. They are extremes that put themselves above other groups, and believe they have a lower value." He also criticized the Malmo's Jewish community for its support for Israel, stating that "I would wish for the Jewish community to denounce Israeli violations against the civilian population in Gaza. Instead it decides to hold a [pro-Israeli] demonstration in the Grand Square [of Malmö], which could send the wrong signals." Jewish leaders responded that the demonstration Reepalu was referring to was a "pro-peace rally" arranged by the Jewish Community in Malmö "which came under attack from members of a violent counter demonstration" and accused Reepalu of "suggesting that the violence directed towards us is our own fault simply because we didn't speak out against Israel."

In early 2010, the Swedish publication The Local published series of articles about the growing antisemitism in Malmö, Sweden. In an interview in January 2010, Fredrik Sieradzki of the Jewish Community of Malmö stated that "Threats against Jews have increased steadily in Malmö in recent years and many young Jewish families are choosing to leave the city. Many feel that the community and local politicians have shown a lack of understanding for how the city's Jewish residents have been marginalized." He also added that "right now many Jews in Malmö are really concerned about the situation here and don't believe they have a future here." The Local also reported that Jewish cemeteries and synagogues have repeatedly been defaced with antisemitic graffiti, and a chapel at another Jewish burial site in Malmö was firebombed in 2009.

The Local reported that Reepalu has "denied that there had been any attacks on Jews in the city despite police figures showing that violent incidents against Jews have doubled over the last year." In January, when asked to explain why Jewish religious services often require security guards and even police protection, Reepalu said that the violence directed toward Malmö's Jewish community is from right-wing extremists.

In an interview with The Sunday Telegraph in February 2010, Reepalu was asked about reports that antisemitism in Malmo has increased to the point that some of its Jewish residents are (or are considering) moving to Israel. Reepalu again denied that there has been any violence directed at Jews in Malmo, stating that "There haven't been any attacks on Jewish people, and if Jews from the city want to move to Israel that is not a matter for Malmö."

The then leader of the Swedish Social Democratic Party, Mona Sahlin, described Reepalu's comments as "unfortunate." Reepalu's statements have been sharply criticized by Sieradzk, who argued that "More often it's the far-left that commonly use Jews as a punching bag for their disdain toward the policies of Israel, even if Jews in Malmö have nothing to do with Israeli politics."

Reepalu later conceded that he has not been sufficiently informed about the vulnerable situation faced by Jews after meeting with community leaders. Reepalu then said that Skånska Dagbladet, the newspaper that initially reported many Reepalu's controversial statements, had misrepresented him as antisemitic; the newspaper was subsequently banned from a press conference at City Hall, reportedly at Reepalu's request. In response, Skånska Dagbladet published on its website the full tapes of its interview with Ilmar Reepalu, as well as all the texts published in its article series on threats and harassment faced by Malmö Jews, and the exchange of emails between the newspaper and the mayor's office.

The Reepalu controversy was addressed by a signed editorial, "The Hunt for Reepalu", that was published in the independent social democratic tabloid Aftonbladet. The editorial was written by Kennet Andreasson, who is an editor of Aftonbladet. Andreasson stated that he "had no reason to believe that Reepalu is a Jew-hater—ignorant, perhaps, unaware of the historical chains of thought-figures that lead to antisemitism, possibly – but mostly naive and honest—and stressed." The characterization the reporter at Skånska Dagbladet made, portraying Reepalu as more interested in talking about Israel's aggressive politics then the problems at hand was unfair, he continued. "Anyone who listens to the questions and answers get a more nuanced picture. More than anything, Reepalu talks about fighting racism wherever it appears and whomever it is directed at. He emphasizes, more than one time, that international politics should not be drawn into local politics." It could have ended with the op-ed for Sydsvenska Dagbladet on January 30 where Reepalu called it "totally unacceptable" to make Malmö's Jews responsible for what happens in Israel, Andreasson observed. "When this did not happen, Reepalu should put an end to it now by swallowing the condemnations. Then he is entitled to his own condemnation of the Israeli atrocities in Gaza. Those who have stood for the blame, in the main driven by zeal for sanitation of antisemitism, at times self-righteousness have been scent, are likely to agree. For it must be possible to express this criticism without being automatically accused of Jew-hating, something that often occurs. To make a hard criticism against the war effort, against the government-conducted murders, against the wall, against the settlements—these criticism are very much justifiable—and legitimate and morally and politically respectable."

== Yiddish in Sweden ==
The waves of Ashkenazic immigration to Sweden also brought the Yiddish language, the predominant language among Eastern European Jews. Yiddish is an officially recognized, non-territorial minority language in Sweden. Like in all of Europe, the usage of Yiddish has declined in the Jewish community. As of 2009, the Jewish population in Sweden was estimated at 20,000. Out of these, 2,000-6,000 claim to have at least some knowledge of Yiddish according to various reports and surveys. The number of native speakers among these has been estimated by linguist Mikael Parkvall to be 750–1,500. It is believed that virtually all native speakers of Yiddish in Sweden today are adults, and most of them elderly.

There are attempts to revive Yiddish in some congregations. The organization Sveriges Jiddischförbund (Yiddish Union of Sweden), earlier named Sällskapet för Jiddisch och Jiddischkultur i Sverige ('Society for Yiddish and Yiddish Culture in Sweden'), has over 200 members, many of whom are native Yiddish speakers, and arranges regular activities for the speech community and in external advocacy of the Yiddish language.

== See also ==
- Israel–Sweden relations
- Antisemitism in Sweden
- Mosaic Parish in Karlskrona
- Racism in Sweden
