= Riddarholmen Church =

Coordinates: 59°19′29″N 18°03′53″E

- Riddarholmskyrkan
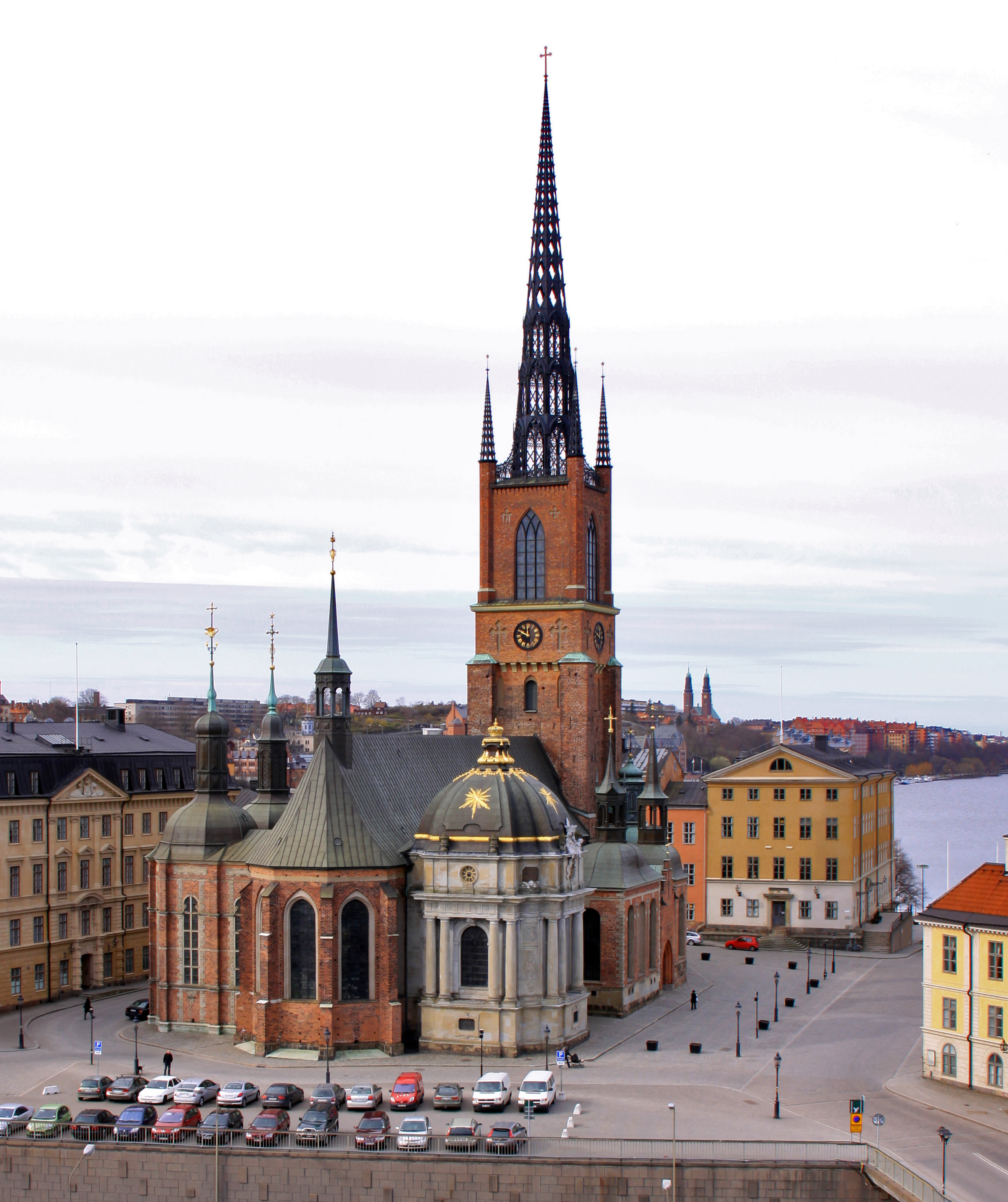
- Riddarholmen Church is one of the oldest buildings in Stockholm
- Riddarholmen Church
- Location: Riddarholmen, Stockholm
- Country: Sweden
- Denomination: Catholic
- Previous denomination: Church of Sweden (1527–1807); Catholic Church (1270–1527)

History
- Status: Museum
- Founded: c. 1270
- Founder: Magnus Birgersson
- Dedication: Francis of Assis
- Consecrated: c. 1300

Architecture
- Functional status: Museum and Event venue
- Architect: Willem Boy (1520–1592) Per Axel Nyström (1793–1868)
- Architectural type: Gothic
- Style: Brick Gothic
- Completed: 1292-1300

Specifications
- Length: 50 m (164.0 ft)
- Width: 24 m (78.7 ft)
- Height: 90,8 m (297.9 ft)
- Materials: Bricks, marbles and sandstone

Administration
- Parish: Riddarholmen (up to 1807)

Riddarholmen Church (Swedish: Riddarholmskyrkan) is the church of the former medieval Greyfriars friary in Stockholm, Sweden. The church serves as the final resting place of most Swedish monarchs.

== Description ==
Riddarholmen Church is located on the island of Riddarholmen, close to the Royal Palace in Stockholm, Sweden. The congregation was dissolved in 1807 and today the church is used only for burial and commemorative purposes. Swedish monarchs from Gustavus Adolphus to Gustaf V are entombed here (with only one exception: Queen Christina who is buried within St. Peter's Basilica in Rome), as well as the earlier monarchs Magnus Ladulås and Charles VIII. It has been discontinued as a royal burial site in favour of the Royal Cemetery and today is run by departments of the Swedish Government and Royal Court.

The Church's age can be seen in its architecture, which is eclectic from various eras. Most of the church is a Northern European Gothic style, but parts of the church are also baroque.

It is one of the oldest buildings in Stockholm, parts of it dating to the late-13th century, when it was built as a Franciscan friary. After the Protestant Reformation, the friary was closed and the building became a Lutheran church. A spire designed by Flemish architect Willem Boy (1520–1592) was added during the reign of John III, but it was destroyed by a lightning strike on 28 July 1835, after which it was replaced with the present cast-iron spire.

Traditionally, the armorial plates depicting the arms of deceased knights of the Royal Order of the Seraphim are affixed to the walls of the church. When a knight of the Order dies, his coat of arms is carried from the royal palace and rehung in the church, and when the funeral takes place the church's bells are rung without pause from 12:00 to 13:00.

== Gallery ==
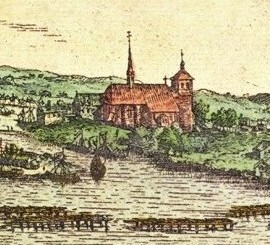
Riddarholmen Church viewed from the north, c. 1570

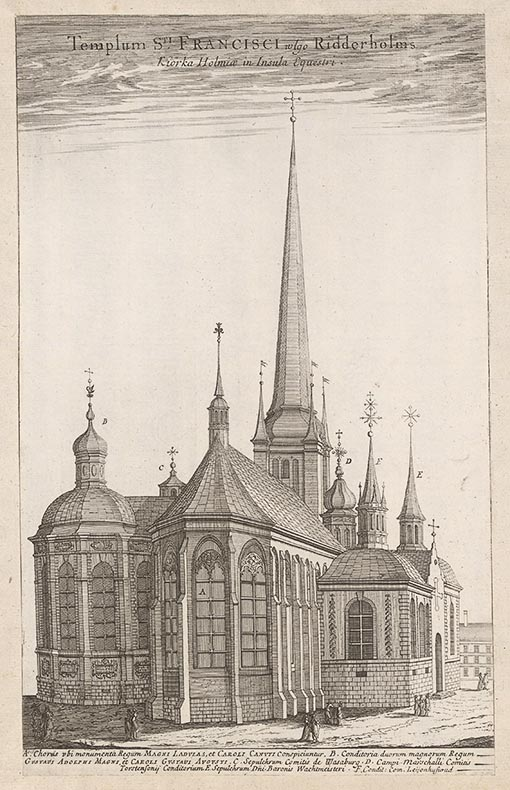
Riddarholmen Church as presented in Suecia Antiqua et Hodierna, 1690–1700

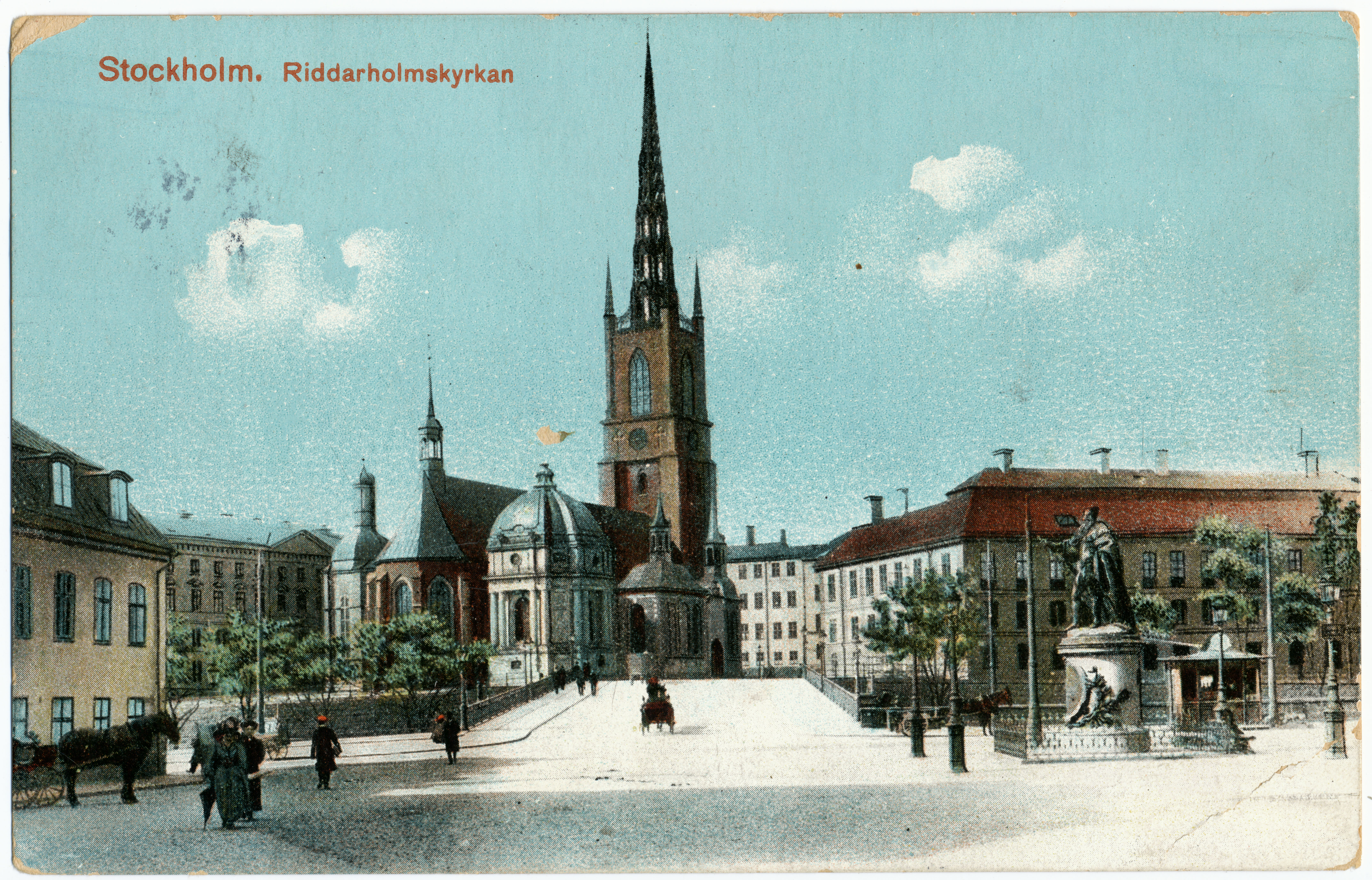
Riddarholmen Church in the early 20th century

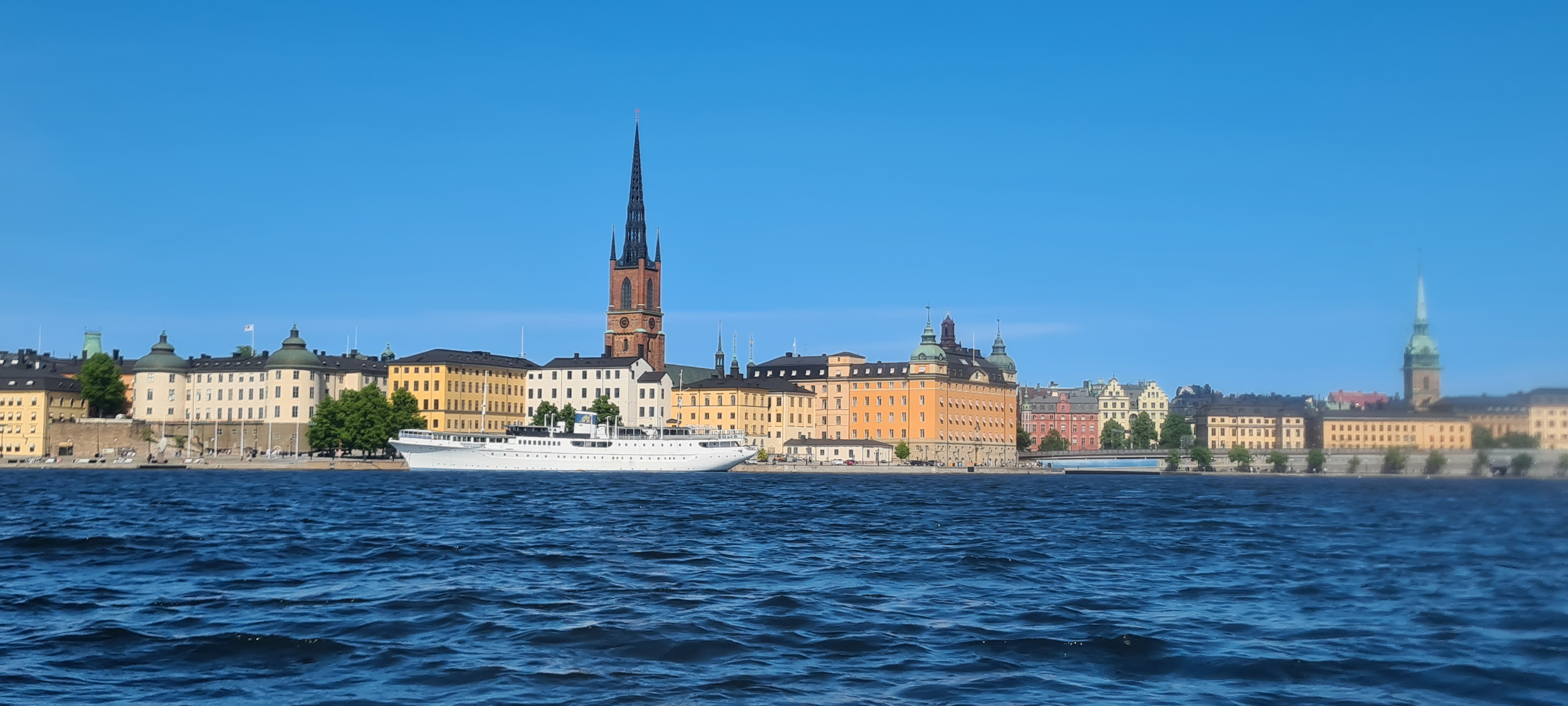
View of Riddarholmen Church

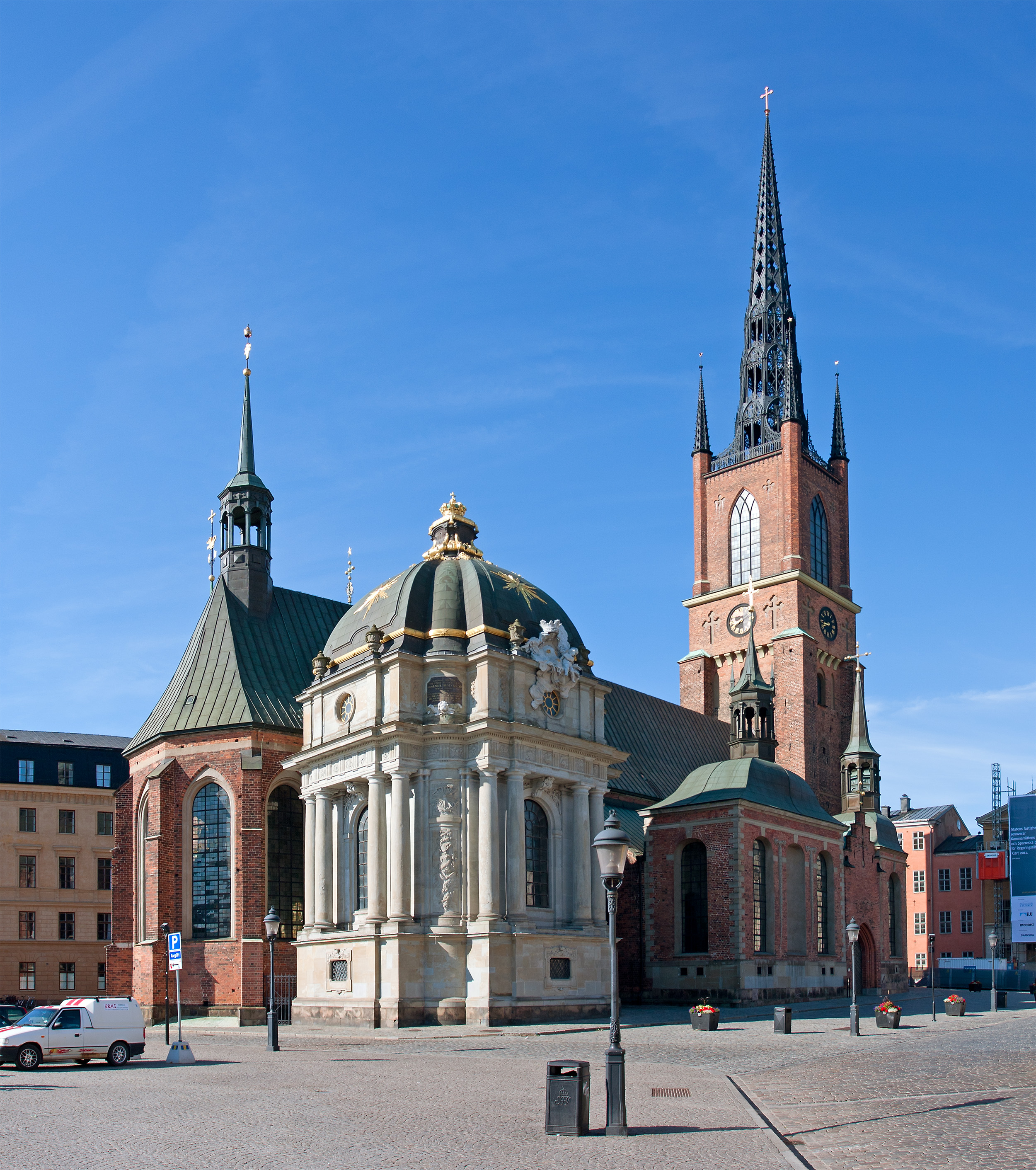
Exterior of Riddarholmen Church

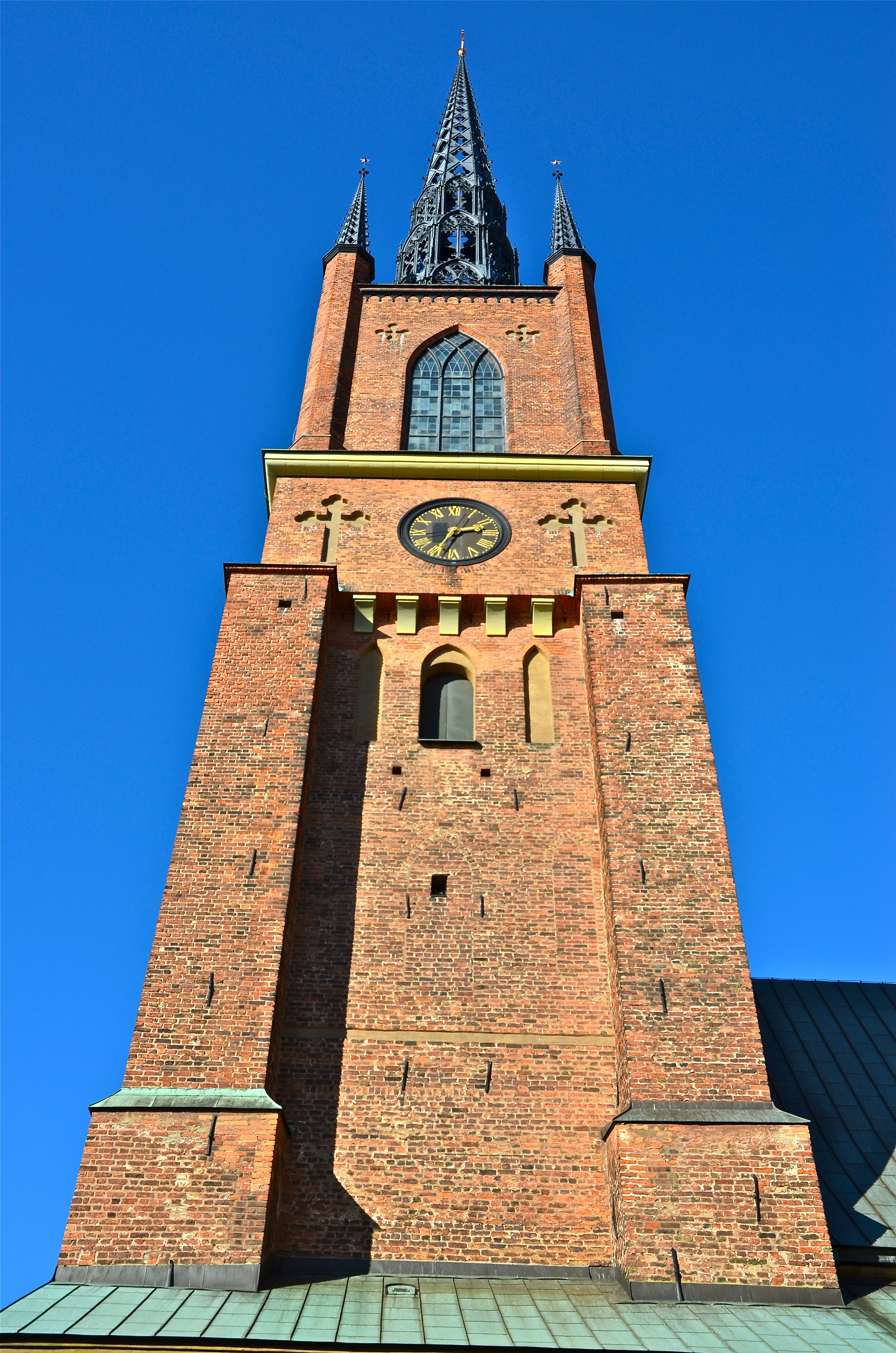
South façade of the church

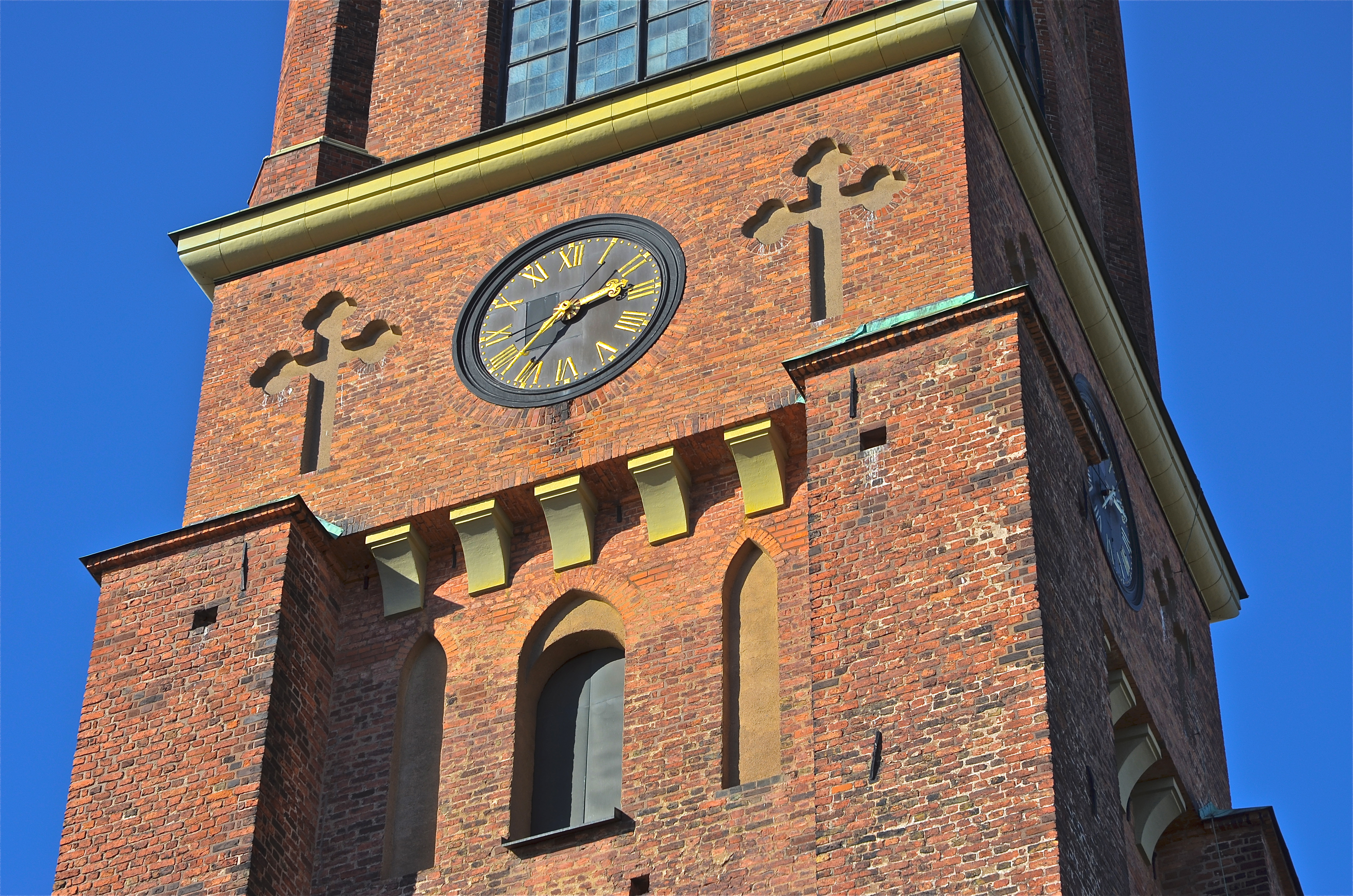
South side of the church tower

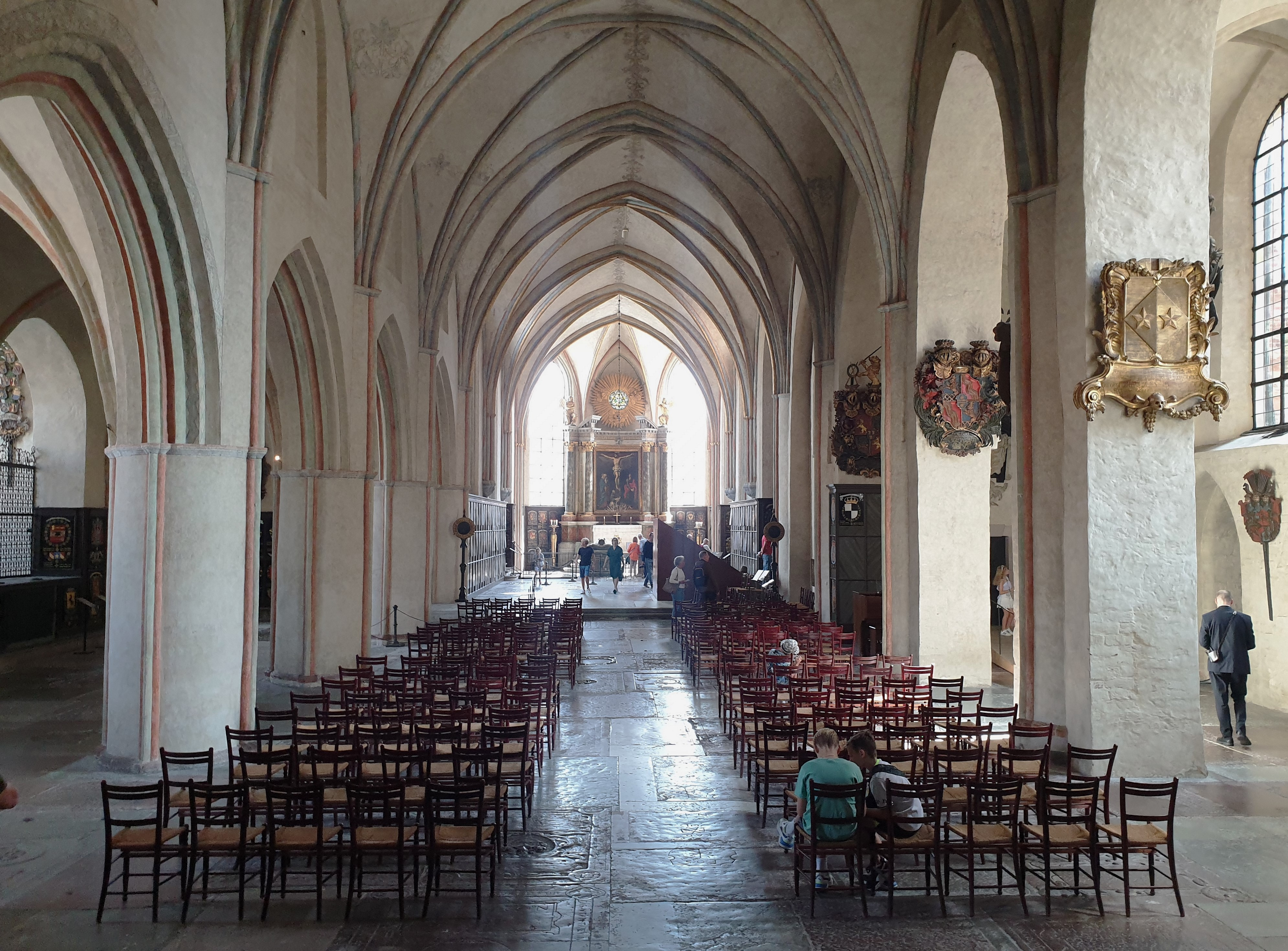
Riddarholmen Church nave, looking east towards main altar

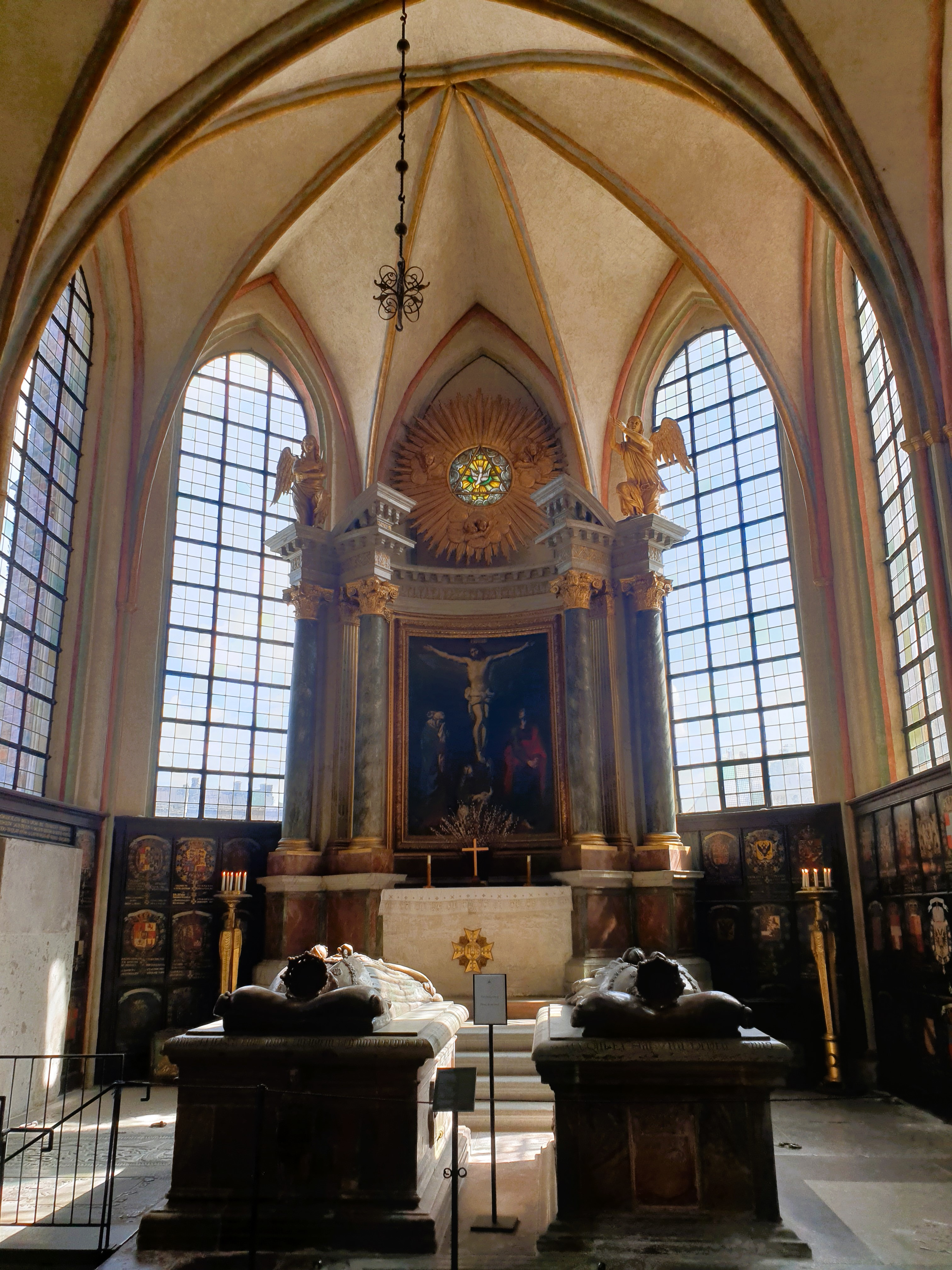
Tomb monuments of Kings Magnus Ladulås and Karl Knutsson in the chancel

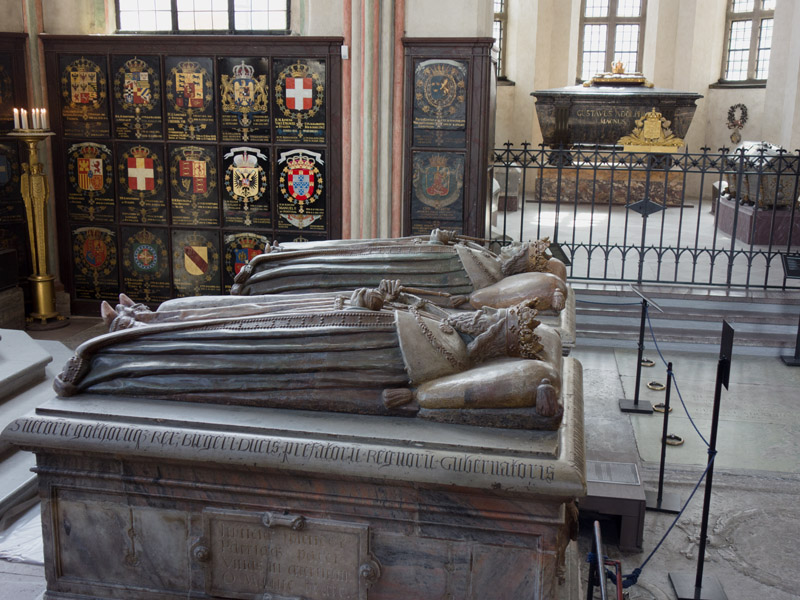
Royal tombs and armorial plates of deceased knights of the Royal Order of the Seraphim

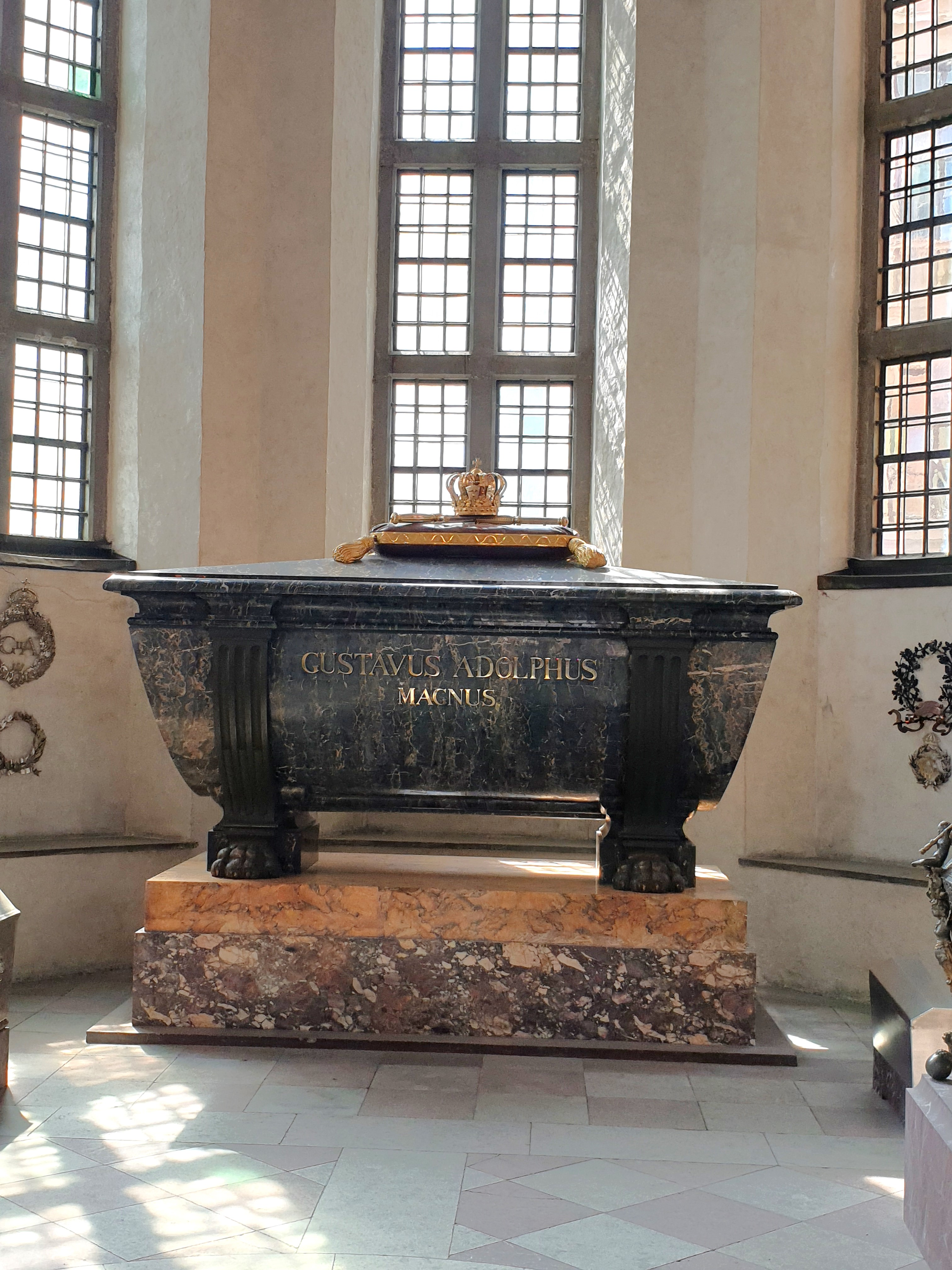
Sarcophagus of King Gustavus Adolphus

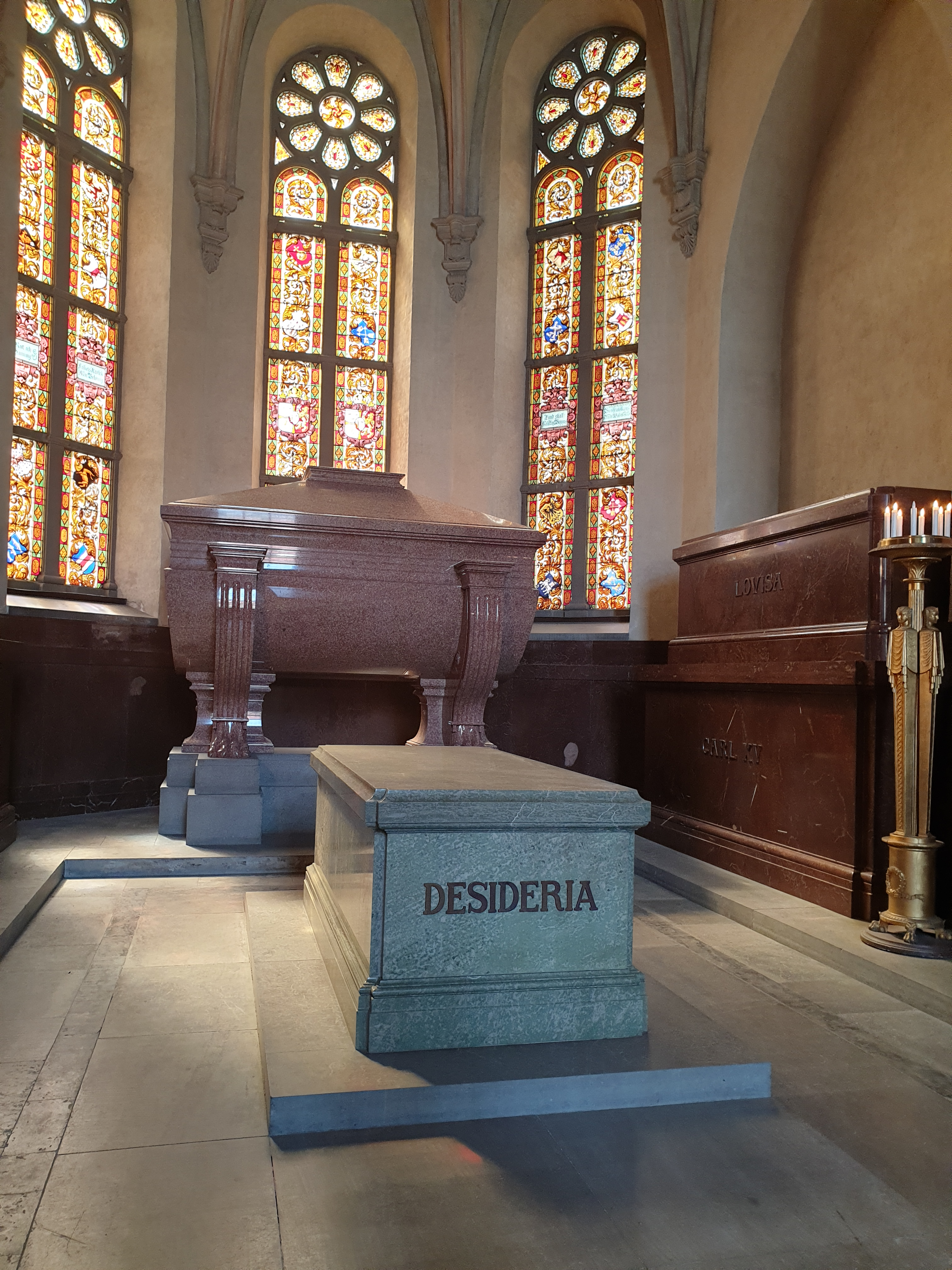
Sarcophagi of Queen Desideria and King Charles XIV John in the Bernadotte Chapel

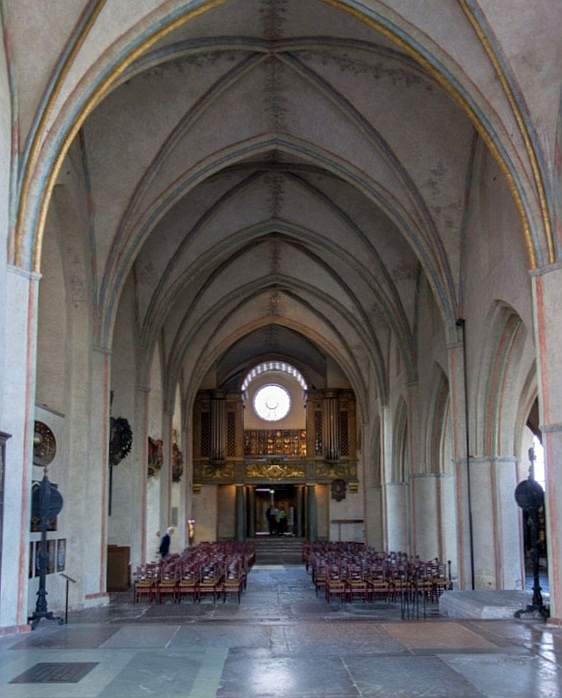
Riddarholmen Church nave, looking east towards organ loft

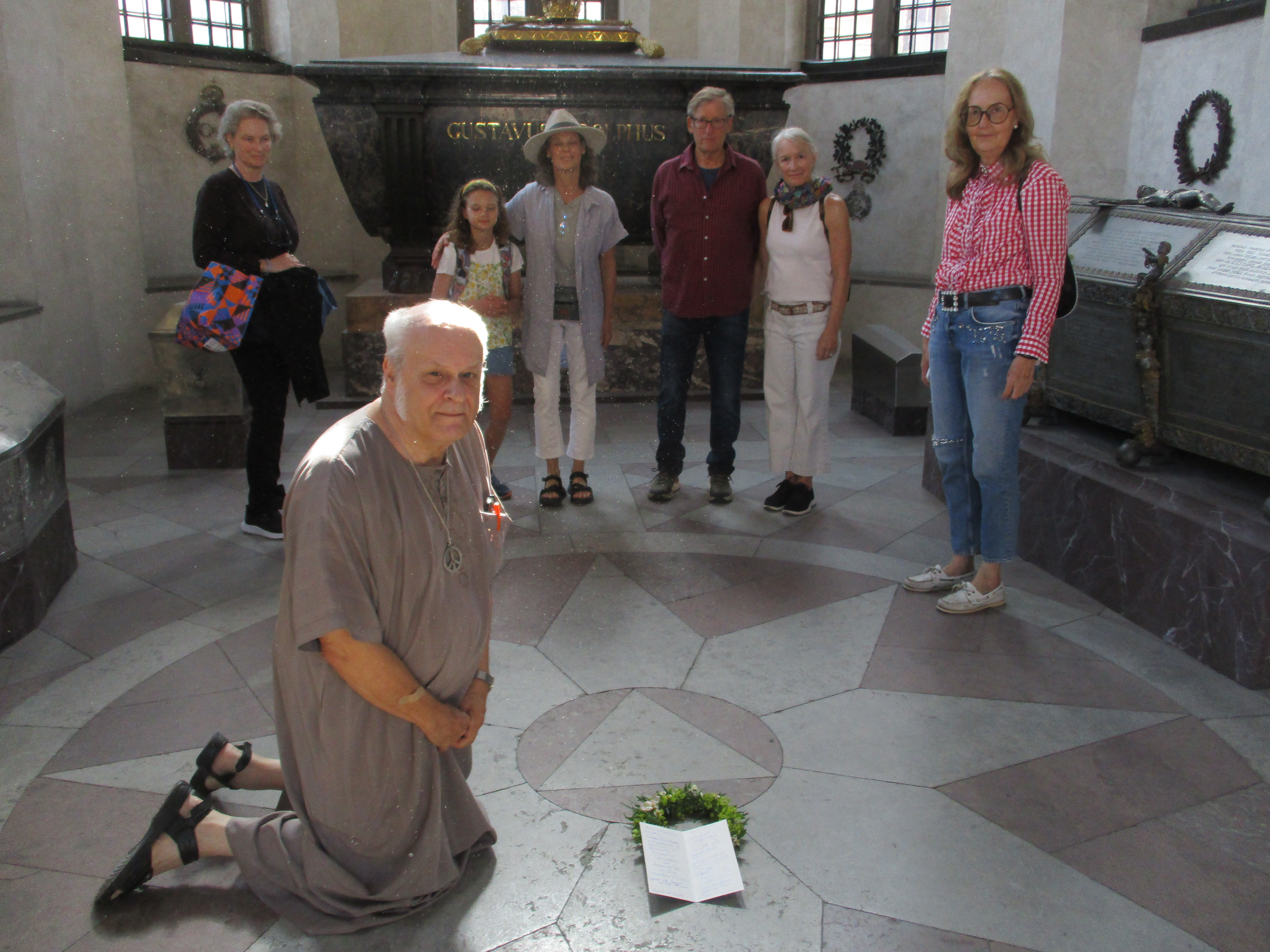
Descendants of Jacob Marcus and Aron von Reis honoring Gustav III in 2024

== See also ==
- List of churches in Stockholm
- Gamla stan
- Storkyrkan
