= Aaron Isaac =

Swedish businessman (1730–1816)

- אהרון יצחק
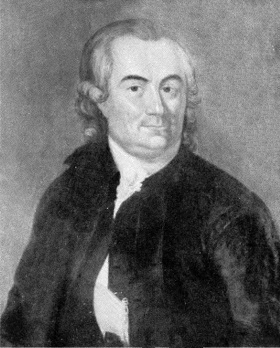
- Aaron Isaac, from Aaron Isaacs minnen (1932).
- Born: 16 September 1730; Treuenbrietzen, Swedish Pomerania
- Died: 21 October 1816 (aged 86); Stockholm, Sweden
- Occupations: Seal engraver, merchant
- Spouse: Sara Hendel Levin (m. 1750; died 1809)

Aaron Isaac (also known as Aron Isak; Hebrew: אהרון יצחק; 16 September 1730 – 21 October 1816) was a Jewish seal engraver and merchant in haberdashery. He came from Swedish Pomerania, a German-speaking area then part of the Swedish Empire, during the reign of Gustav III, and was persuaded to come to Sweden where there were no seal engravers at the time. He did this on the condition that he could bring with him at least ten Jews, in order to have a minyan (quorum) for prayer. His native language was Yiddish.

== Background ==
It was the age of the Enlightenment, led by philosophers whose works revolutionized the social structure of Europe. Some liberally minded monarchs, like Gustav III, eased restrictions on Jewish settlement. "In 1781, opposed by the Swedish clergy, he pushed through the first law guaranteeing certain religious freedoms. This law gave foreigners the right to practise their religion but it forbade them to proselytize and to encourage Lutherans to leave their faith.". Gustav III, in a letter to his mother, the dowager queen Lovisa Ulrika, wrote, "...It is certain, that it would be highly beneficial to the country, if such a hardworking people as the Jews were to settle here..."

== Biography ==
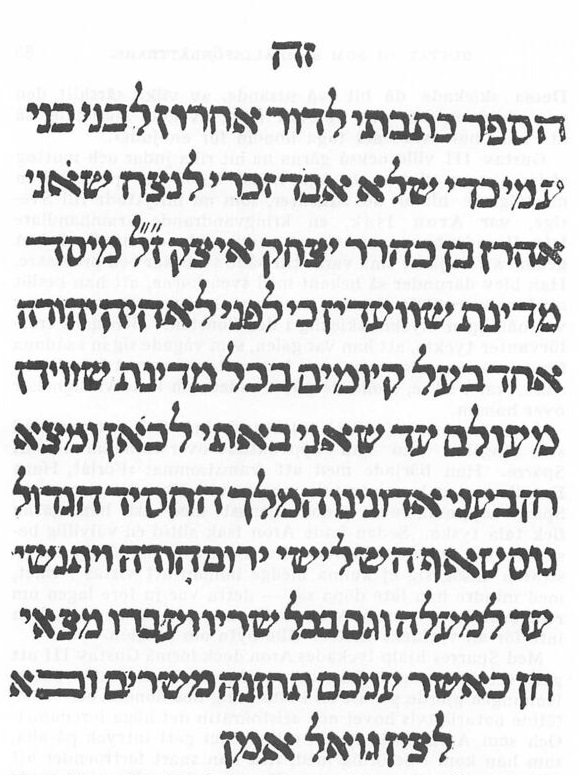
Title page of Aaron Isaac's autobiography.

The son of a merchant in Treuenbrietzen, Brandenburg, Isaac first made his living as a peddler, but at a young age he apprenticed as a seal engraver and settled in the university town of Bützow in the Duchy of Mecklenburg-Schwerin. He worked there as an assistant to a seal engraver and on the side sold haberdashery goods. In 1750, he married Sara Hendel Levin, daughter of schoolmaster Levin Samuel and Margarethe Lösern. During the Seven Years' War, he earned money by selling his goods to both Swedes and Prussians. He came into contact with Swedish officers and received many commissions to engrave seals from them, and was told that there was a shortage of people with his skills in Sweden. The officers in turn put him in contact with Carl Sparre, the governor of Stockholm. In 1774, Isaac received permission and moved to Stockholm. However, his fellow believers thought he was mad to venture into such dangers. For as long as the ship on which he traveled across from Stralsund was in sight, they stood on the shore and read blessings over him.

Isaac, favored by Sparre, received permission to settle there and bring his wife and children. The magistrate had felt unable to grant him the right to stay in the kingdom unless he was baptized (this was before the Tolerance Act), but Isaac declared that he refused to change his religion. With Sparre's help, he managed to persuade Gustav III to make an exception for him and some of his fellow Jews. The king immediately placed an order from him, and the court and aristocracy followed suit. In 1775, he, his brother Marcus Isaac, and their companion Abraham Pach were granted licenses to work as seal engravers and as stonemasons.

Although their right to settle in Sweden and practise their religion had been ensured, they had not been accepted into society and were isolated by a fear of being assaulted. Isaac later wrote in his memoirs that "...If I were to write the complete history of how they have persecuted me and my family this book would be too small to contain it. But I saw clearly that God was always on my side and prevailed against my enemies without my having to lift a hand against them."

Isaac embarked on wide-ranging economic ventures after gaining the confidence of the authorities. His acquaintance with Baron Sparre and Baron Johan Liljencrantz, the head of the national finances, was of great importance to Isaac. The head of the mint, Gustaf von Engeström, had noticed during his travels abroad how Jews had with great skill procured silver for the mints in various countries, and during the reorganization of the Swedish monetary system at that time, attention was therefore focused on Isaac as a possible silver supplier.

Baron Liljencrantz also entered into negotiations with Isaac, who was soon given the task of acquiring silver for Swedish coins over a period of three years, amounting to no less than eleven million riksdaler specie of silver metal at a rate four percent higher than that paid in Hamburg. In addition, the silver would be transported for free by peasants on behalf of the state (kronoskjuts). In connection with this agreement, Isaac was also commissioned to attempt to sell a large consignment of 100,000 ship pounds (skeppund) of copper that was stored at the Riksbank without interest. He was promised a commission of one riksdaler per pound. The deal was not completed, however, as Isaac's brother and partner were hesitant about the venture.

Isaac's reputation grew from year to year. Also contributing to this was his son Nathaniel, who was appointed court jeweler by Gustav III.

The 1778–1779 Riksdag (parliament) authorized the Jews to have a synagogue in Stockholm and no more than three other cities. In 1782, the so-called Judereglementet ('Jewish Regulations') were issued, which regulated which industries the Jews were allowed to pursue and in which cities they were allowed to live. Isaac exerted considerable influence on the authorities in drafting the Judereglementet. His knowledge of the Jews' circumstances was considered to be of great value.

In 1788, Isaac, who in addition to engraving also engaged in trade, was appointed army supplier in the war against Russia (he received a Royal warrant of appointment in 1789) and went to Finland. Due to the shortage of money during the war, war commissary Per Georg Fahnehielm issued notes or tokens to the field treasury, called Fahnehjelmare, which were to be equivalent to national banknotes. At the same time, Gustav III set up a banknote printing plant to produce counterfeit Russian money, thereby spreading unrest in the Russian economy. During an exchange transaction with Count Adolf Fredrik Munck, Isaac was then swindled by Munck with fake Fahnehjelmare, which Munck had printed on his own initiative. He was arrested for a time in Turku but was acquitted, while Munck was forced into exile in 1792.

So great was the confidence of the authorities in Isaac that he was given the right as head of the Jewish community of Stockholm to exercise a certain control over the Jews in Sweden, so that no less reputable Jews were allowed to enter the country. Isaac therefore became the gateway through which Jewish immigration passed. He was careful about who would be permitted to immigrate because the reputation of the Jewish community in Stockholm rested upon the usefulness of Jewish assistance to the national economy. Immigration thus focused on relatives of Isaac and Jewish families from Germany who could bring their own capital and start their own businesses. Isaac had a strong ability to win over the higher officials, and especially the lord chamberlain, Baron Sparre, to his cause. Isaac was also well regarded at the palace, where he had a patron and friend, especially in Duke Charles, who often fulfilled his wishes. However, this position of power was associated with some discomfort for Isaac, as it sometimes caused him envy and resentment on the part of the other Jews, which on several occasions led to strife within the congregation.

From the beginning of his time in Stockholm, Isaac gathered a small circle of friends and relatives who put considerable effort into the development of the newly founded Jewish community. These included his brother Marcus, Abraham Bach, Gumpert Hirsch, Abraham Ferdan and Isaac's son Nathan.

In his later years, Isaac recorded his memories in Western Yiddish. His memoirs have been published in several editions and in translations into standard German and Eastern or standard Yiddish. Among other things, the memoirs reveal the conflicts Isaac had with other members of the Stockholm Jewish community, where his leadership was controversial. He personally purchased a cemetery for the Jews of Stockholm, which still bears his name, Aronsberg on Kungsholmen, while another group in the congregation established their own cemetery, Kronoberg, in what is now Kronobergsparken on Kungsholmen.

Isaac died in Stockholm in 1816.

== Legacy ==
Prior to Isaac and Gustav III, Jews in Sweden were required either to convert to Christianity or to live an illegal and nomadic existence. By creating the conditions for Jewish families to remain Jewish and become part of the Swedish nation, they built the foundation for the modern-day Jewish community of Sweden.

Since 1989, the Aaron Isaac Award has been awarded annually by the Jewish congregation in Stockholm.

== See also ==
- History of the Jews in Sweden
- Stockholm Synagogue (reference to the original synagogue in Stockholm, at Tyska Brunnsplan, 1790–1870)
- Marstrand Free Port
