= Moses Uri HaLevi =

Rabbi

- Born: c. 1543; Braunschweig or Wittmund, Duchy of Brunswick-Lüneburg, Holy Roman Empire
- Died: c. 1621/1625; Amsterdam?, Dutch Republic
- Occupation: Rabbi
- Years active: 1570–1601
- Known for: Chief Rabbi of Amsterdam

Moses Uri ben Yoseph HaLevi (also known as Moses Uri Levi, Moses Uri Halewi, Philip Uri Joosten Halevi; Hebrew: אורי הלוי; c. 1543 – c. 1621/1625, presumably in Amsterdam) [not to be confused with Moses ben Joseph ben Merwan Ha-Levi, Mullah Moshe Halevi of Kashan, or Moshe b. Levi ha-Levi (from geniza documents)] was a German rabbi who become an instrumental figure and a key founder of the Spanish-Portuguese community of Amsterdam. Born likely in either the German city of Wittmund or Braunschweig, he became the first chief rabbi of the Jewish Community of Amsterdam. He is considered to be the founder of the first Jewish community in Amsterdam and the first rabbi of a Sephardic community in Northern Europe.

== Biography ==
Moses Uri HaLevi was born to Joseph ben Ephraim HaLevi, a native of Braunschweig. He probably had to flee his hometown in 1557 when the Jews were expelled. He settled in the East Frisian Emden. Ashkenazi Jews had settled there for several years because the Count of East Friesland had placed them under their special protection; HaLevi is the first Emden Jew whose name has been passed down. Various variants of his name are known, such as Feibisch Emden in Jewish sources as the Yiddish equivalent of the Hebrew name Uri or in Dutch Philips Joost. The first name Moses is not documented during his lifetime.

HaLevi lived in Emden for around 40 years. According to his own statements, he officiated from around 1570 to 1601 as a teacher and rabbi for the small Ashkenazi Jewish community there and apparently had a network of contacts in Europe. In 1598 he was arrested as an exposed member of the community with two other Jewish men by the Emden council, but was released on the basis of a petition from the Prague and Bohemian Jewish elders to Emperor Rudolf II. Despite the benevolence of Count Enno III, who profited economically from the trading activities of the Jews, the citizens and clergy demanded their expulsion.

According to a tradition that is also the founding legend of the Amsterdam Portuguese Jewish community, in 1601 a group of conversos or New Christians under the leadership of Jacob Tirado reached Emden by ship. The ship that came from London is said to have been driven off by a storm. They came from families who, as descendants of forced Christian converts, who wished to become Jews, but had little knowledge of the Jewish religion of their ancestors. A Hebrew inscription made them aware of the home of Moses Uri HaLevi and went to see him. When they found out that he was indeed a Jew, they asked him to teach them about Judaism. HaLevi had suggested that they go to Amsterdam together because they could freely practice their religion there. According to other sources, this initiative is said to have come from Uri's son Aaron, who - unlike his father, who only spoke German, was able to communicate with conversos in Spanish. The narrative of these events was described by the grandson of Moses and Aaron's son, the printer Uri Phoebus HaLevi, in his 1711 book Narração da vinda dos judeos espanhoes a Amsterdam. Another report differs in the there is the establishment of contact between the group HaLevi . Uri HaLevi s son Joseph is said to have traded with conversos as early as 1598 and established connections.

Just a few weeks after their arrival in Calvinist Amsterdam, Moses HaLevi and his son Aaron are said to have been arrested. The reason for the arrest was the suspicion that masses were being held in Latin in their home, which is why it was assumed that they were Spanish Catholics hated in the Netherlands. Both men were released shortly after they had declared that they were Jews. According to other information, HaLevi was imprisoned again because he earned his money as a fence, pawnbroker and circumciser, which he was able to refute.

The first group of conversos was followed by others from Portugal to Amsterdam; the wealthy Jews who traded across Europe were welcome in the impoverished Netherlands. They rented a house in Amsterdam, where they were evidently instructed by haHaLevi Levi, who, however, did not necessarily have to be aware of the differences between the various rites. It is believed that ha-HaLevi was in the possession of the (Sephardic) Amsterdam Machsor and on whose basis he introduced the Marranos to Jewish rites; this manuscript is said to have passed on to his grandson Moses later. In 1603 the Portuguese community Beth Jaacob was founded: "Historically remarkable is [...] the fact that he [Moses Uri HaLevi], as Ashkenazi, built up a Sephardic community."

HaLevi was a rabbi and circumcised the converso men who had had no such opportunity in Catholic Iberia. He was a ritual slaughterer of animals, himself the provisioner of kosher meat to the community. His son Aaron acted as a chazzan. Both are said to have performed a total of around 2500 circumcisions.

Despite all these important functions within the Portuguese Jewish community, the HaLevi family were among the poorer in the community and were dependent on donations from the richer Sephardi. The Ashkenazi descendants of HaLevi retained special rights within the Sephardic community for around 100 years. These special rights could have given rise to a dispute between the grandson Uri Phoebus HaLevi and the community, after which he gave the Amsterdam Machsor as a gift to the Sephardic community in 1669.

In addition to Aaron and Joseph, two other children are recorded for HaLevi , a daughter of unknown name, and Jacob, the progenitor of a Jacobson family in Hamburg. In a prominent Swedish branch of his family descending from Aron von Reis, notable names include Isa Quensel, Magnus Uggla, Stefan Anderson and Siri von Reis.

== Sources ==
- Kaplan, Yosef (2000). An Alternative Path to Modernity: The Sephardi Diaspora in Western Europe. Brill's Series in Jewish Studies (1st ed.). Boston: BRILL. ISBN 978-90-04-11742-6.
