= Judereglementet =

1782 Swedish law regarding Judaism

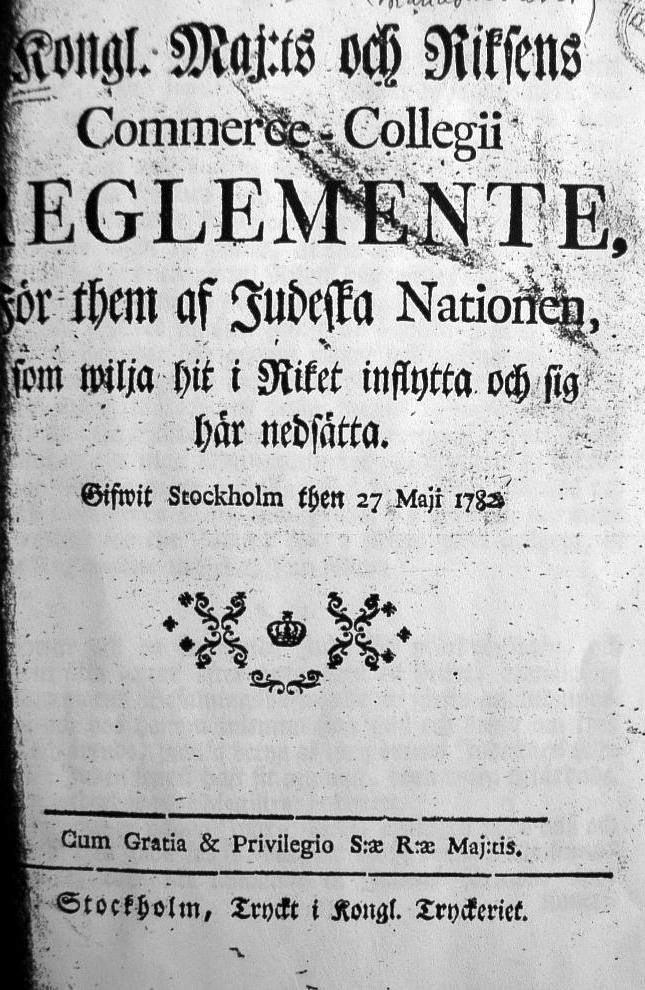
Front page of Judereglementet

Judereglementet (English: 'The Jewish Regulations') was a 1782 Swedish statute containing regulations "for those of the Jewish Nation wishing to move to and settle in the Kingdom (of Sweden)" without having to convert to Lutheranism, as the law had stipulated hitherto. The regulations were issued on 27 May 1782 by the National Board of Trade on behalf of the Parliament and the King in Council. The regulations came about as a result of King Gustav III allowing Jews to come to Sweden in the 1770s and obtain civil rights without converting. In 1774 Aaron Isaac of Bützow, settled permanently as the first Jew in Sweden.

The provisions enabled Jews to settle and become naturalized Swedish citizens, as long as they were in possession of assets. Earlier legislation banning Jews altogether was modified so as to only ban poor Jews. The minimum capital stipulated was two thousand riksdaler that included clothes, effects, household inventory, running costs, and ready cash as well as bills of exchange. Jews could not bring domestic servants with them, lest they smuggle beggar Jews (tiggare Judar) into the country.

Jews were restricted to three cities: Stockholm, Gothenburg and Norrköping, where they were permitted to build synagogues. However, Jews could only marry within their own faith, could not become Members of Parliament, and were not allowed to proselytize. Despite the restrictions, a Jewish congregation was established in Karlskrona after a few years, and another one existed for a short time in Marstrand, whose porto franco privileges in the 1770s and 1780s placed the town outside of normal Swedish law.

The statute also restricted the occupations Jews could pursue: membership of guilds was not open to them. Judereglementet specified occupations such as engraving, the cutting of diamonds and other precious stones, and making instruments, while trading in gold was restricted to the guilds.

After the French Revolution of 1830, a wave of liberalism swept across Europe, opposing the privileges of the guilds and aristocracy and demanding inalienable human rights, including the emancipation of the Jews. In February 1838, the King commissioned the Board of Trade to draw up a modernized set of Jewish regulations. Five of the elders of the Stockholm Jewish community demanded that the regulations be repealed. In the face of heavy criticism, 30 June 1838, Judereglementet was repealed. The Jews in Sweden then became Swedish citizens "of the Mosaic creed", but certain restrictions on places of residence and other civil rights remained until 1870. The last of these restrictions were lifted in 1952, when Jews and other non-Christians were allowed to hold government office.

== See also ==
- History of the Jews in Sweden
- Religion in Sweden
- Aaron Isaac
