= Kronoskjuts =

Transport obligation of Swedish peasants

Kronoskjuts (Swedish; Kruununkyyti in Finnish; lit. 'Crown transport') was the historical obligation of Swedish and Finnish peasants to transport state officials and state property. Officials could demand rides (Swedish: friskjuts) at will and without payment. It was, however, limited by the Ordinance of Alsnö and a number of subsequent government orders to specific cases. In the middle of the 17th century, the obligation was reintroduced and used when the king, queen and court were traveling (Swedish: kungsskjuts). It was also used to transport troops and military supplies or other Crown property. A third case was the transport of prisoners (Swedish: fångtransport).

Those free from the requirement included the nobility, royal estates, cities and their subordinate estates, and postmen. In 1527, for instance, Gustav Vasa allowed those on the postal route who were responsible for the transportation of mail across the Sea of Åland a dispensation.

It was not until 1689 that Crown transport was subject to a fee. Prison transportation became a paid service in 1734. Exceptions could be ordered, then under the name Swedish: fri kronoskjuts 'free Crown transportation'. In 1878, the transportation reform stipulated that Crown transportation in peacetime should not be used by the Crown's staff, unless great urgency "was necessary".

In Finland, this responsibility was given to the state in 1920; the law was later repealed in 1950.

== See also ==
- Corvée
- Feudal duties
