= The Mosaic Parish in Karlskrona =

The Mosaic Parish in Karlskrona, Mosaiska församlingen i Karlskrona, founded in 1785, was the fourth Jewish parish in Sweden. In 1994 it was placed in a resting mode.

== Background ==
Jews were not allowed to reside in Sweden prior to 1779 and when, in the reign of Gustav III, the first Jews from Swedish Pomerania were encouraged to come in order to stimulate trade in the reign of Gustav III, the Parliamentary Constitutional Committee (Konstitutionsutskottet) sent off to the German states of Saxony and Prussia for copies of the codices regulating protected Jews (German: schutzjude Swedish: skyddsjude pl. skyddsjudar) and drew up a Swedish version: Regulations for Jews: Judereglementet where similar restrictions and disabilities were imposed on Jews as in the German states. Among these was a disability concerning residence that was to be restricted to three towns only: Stockholm, the capital city; Gothenburg the busiest naval and trading port and the largest market town: Norrköping.

Other provisions in the Juderegelemente were that Jews were not permitted to intermarry with Christians; to work with or trade in gold (because of pressure from guilds); may sell food to other Jews, but not to Christians; may not convert Christians and because previous laws had prohibited Jews who were itinerant pedlars had banished them from the country along with gypsies and circus folk - "tight rope walkers and sellers of barometers", only rich Jews were admitted who had a minimum capital of two thousand riksdalers. These Jews were prohibited from enabling poor Jews to obtain residence.

== Foundation ==
The Mosaic Parish in Karlskrona, Mosaiska församlingen i Karlskrona, was founded in 1785 by the Jewish merchant and factory owner Fabian Philip. He arrived in Karlskrona in 1780 via Stockholm from his native town of Bützow in Germany.

Fabian Philip lived in Karlskrona, the principal naval base and Sweden's second largest city. He made an offer to Henric af Trolle, Admiral of the Fleet, to build a sail cloth mill to undercut the price of sails the navy bought in Gothenburg. Trolle liked the proposition and presented it to King Gustav III, who gave his permission for the Jew Fabian Philip to reside in Karlskrona even though the Judereglementet did not permit it. Henric af Trolle died in 1784 and the merchants in Karlskrona tried to get rid of the mill called Fabian Philip by writing to the king, but af Trolle's successor, Fleet Admiral Carl August Ehrensvärd, were of the same opinion as his late predecessor.

From 1785 thanks to that Fabian Philip had fulfilled his agreement with the Navy and founded and built the sail factory in Karlskrona, more exactly in Lyckeby, 10 kilometers north of the city, there was a public exception for Fabian Philip and his family to stay in Karlskrona from Commercial Colleges statement of where Jews were allowed to stay in Sweden.

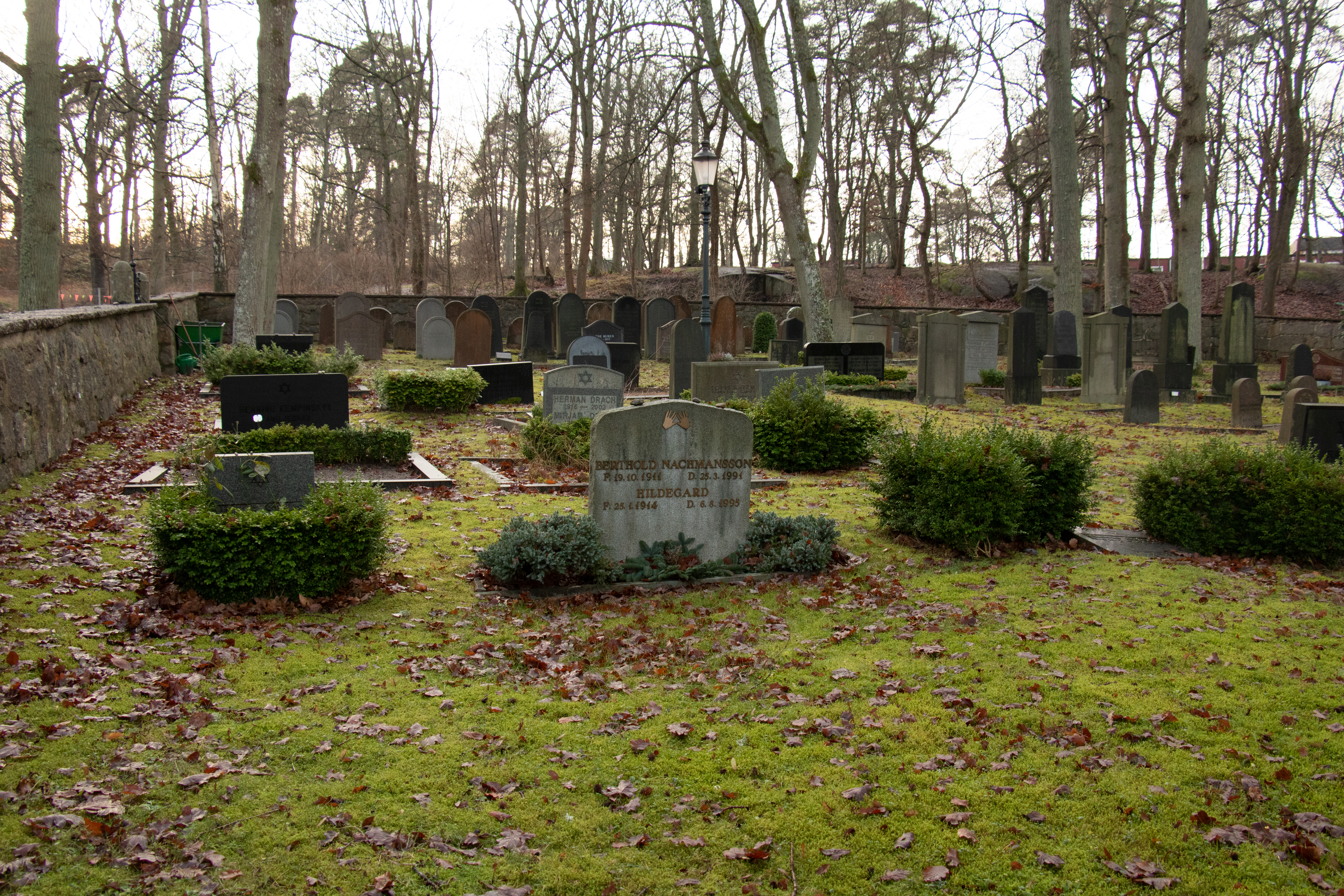
Jewish cemetery in Karlskrona

The Mosaic Parish of Karlskrona was the fourth Jewish parish in Sweden after three first approved settlement cities. The first name of the parish was the Jewish parish, but when the Jews living in Sweden were made Swedish citizens of the Mosaic faith, they were not considered as Jews by the government any more, all the Jewish parishes in Sweden were renamed Mosaic Parishes. 1951 when it was allowed in Sweden by law to be unorganised according to faith, most Mosaic Parishes in Sweden were by own will renamed Jewish Parishes, but not the parish in Karlskrona, which kept the old name of the Mosaic Parish in Karlskrona.

== Present ==
In 1994 it was decided that the Mosaic Parish in Karlskrona should not be closed but placed in a resting mode. The members had become old and it was hard gather a minyan. In the early 1900s, the parish was made up of around 50 members.

== Literature ==
Svensson, Harry R:son. 2001. Mosaiska församlingen i Karlskrona under senare delen av 1800-talet - en församling i förändring. Master thesis, Blekinge Institute of Technology. Karlskrona.

Svensson, Harry R:son. 2007. Familjen har aldrig assimilerats, den har alltid varit en del av Karlskrona' - Det karlskronitiska samhället och dess invånare av judisk härkomst 1779-1945 - en annan assimilationshistoria. Bachelor thesis, Theological Institution at University of Lund. Lund.

Valentin, Hugo. 1924. Judarnas historia i Sverige. Stockholm.
