= Aron von Reis =

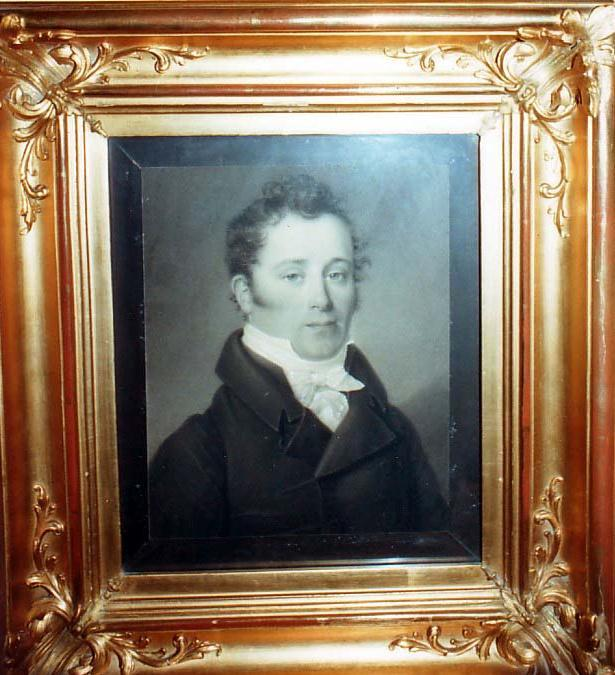
Von Reis about 1814 by François Boudiot who also painted Aron's wife Lowisa Marcus

Aron von Reis, originally Aron van Rees (born 30 August 1777 in the Netherlands, died 9 June 1848 in Marstrand, Sweden, was a Dutch-Swedish industrialist in Gothenburg. He and a business partner specialized in creating cotton textiles and printing floral patterns on them called kattun, receiving royal decorations for their success.

== Biography ==
=== Origin ===
Aron von Reis was the son of tobacco processor and factory owner Andreas van Reis (alternatively called Anschel, Andries van Rees, Andreas wan Reijs, Anders von Reis) and Sara Aronsdotter Herfurt, he from Nijkerk, she from Amsterdam, both deceased in Gothenburg. She was a descendant of Philip Uri Joosten Halevi. The family was among the first Jews allowed to settle in the Marstrand Free Port, so declared by King Gustav III of Sweden.

=== Career ===
In 1815 von Reis and Aron Magnusson founded the successful cotton printing plant known as Aronsdal in Gothenburg. Magnusson's and von Reis's wives Fredrika Marcus and Lowisa Marcus were first cousins. Their factory annually produced over 100,000 ells of cotton fabric, plain as well as printed. King Charles XIV John of Sweden and Norway awarded each of the partners a gold medal with the ribbon of Vasaorden in 1821 for their industrial achievements. The following year, the partners also opened a weaving facility Wäfveriet Lovisa Fredrica in Aronsdal (today the Krokslätt area of central Gothenburg), and the von Reis family resided in the factory's apartments 1816–1823.

=== Family ===
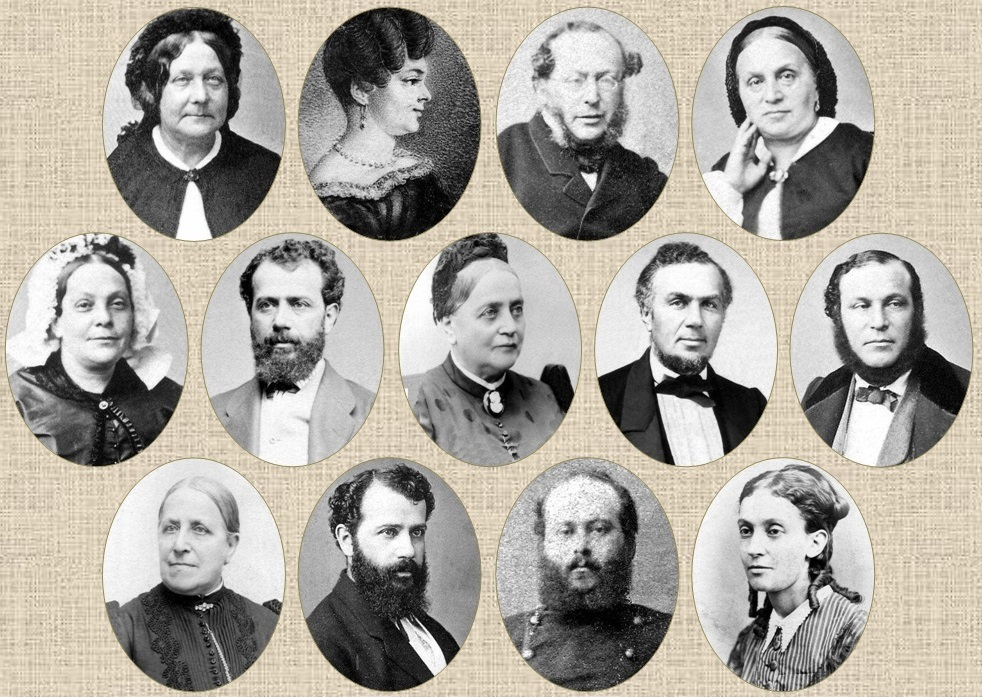
13 of the 17 children of Aron von Reis and Lowisa Marcus

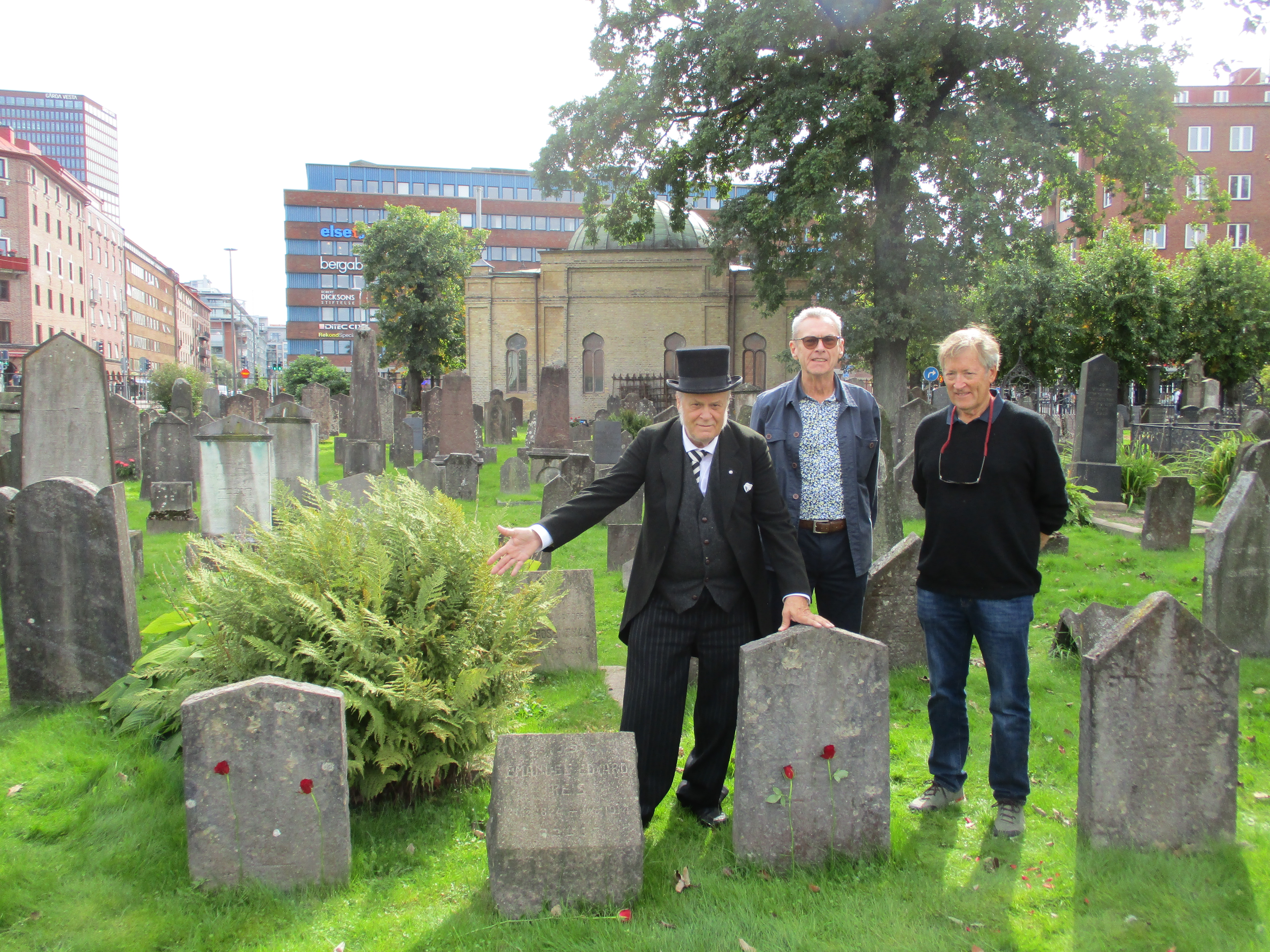
Swedish and American descendants at Lowisa's and Aron's graves in 2024

Aron von Reis and his brother Moses von Reis both married daughters of Norrköping community leader Jacob Marcus. Aron and his wife Lowisa had 17 children whose notable descendants include Isa Quensel, Magnus Uggla, Stefan Anderson and Birgit Ridderstedt. Two of their sons were among the first students at Chalmers University of Technology and the Gothenburg Institute of Commerce. Another son had a very early photo studio in Gothenburg. Hugo Valentin has described the von Reis family in his writings. Aron's brother Moses is among the ancestors of Siri von Reis and her daughter Serena Altschul. The marked graves of Aron von Reis and his wife and parents are all in the Old Mosaic Cemetery of Svingeln in Gothenburg.
