= Jacob Marcus =

German-Swedish businessman

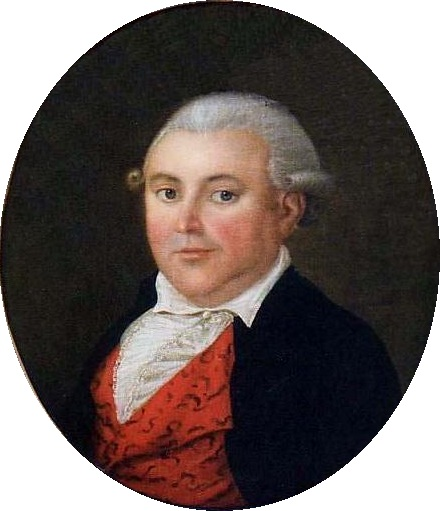
Jacob Marcus painted in oils by an unknown master around 1792.

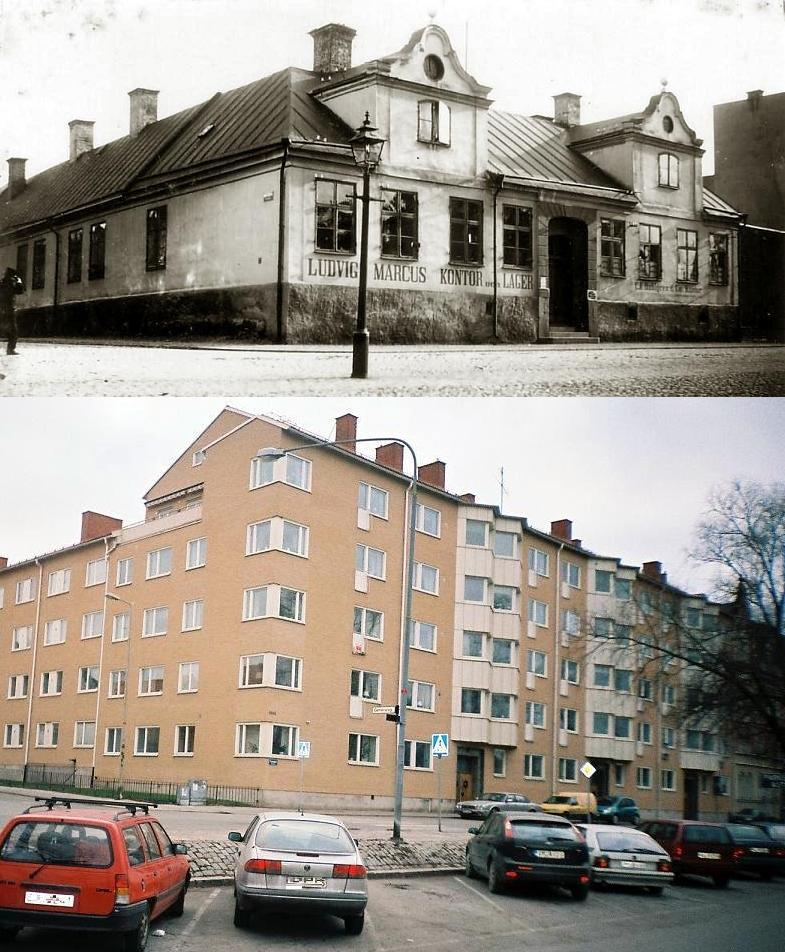
The Marcus Building family seat on the Motala River, before demolition in 1917, and the same corner in 2009.

Jacob Marcus, also called R. Jakob, was a German-Swedish businessman and one of the pioneers in the history of Sweden's Jewish population, which began to take root around the turn of the 18th-19th centuries.

Marcus was probably born in 1749 in Schwaan, Holy Roman Empire. Marcus's considerable impact on the history of Norrköping and his significance to immigration and advancement have been pointed out in several publications. He had that city's first synagogue built, which opened in 1796 for the increasing community centered on its congregation.

That and his general benefit to Sweden, as a merchant especially privileged by King Gustav III, and his position as an East Gothland property owner and community leader, have been recorded in published biographical articles.

Marcus died 13 March 1819 in Norrköping.

== Known descendants ==
Two of Marcus's daughters, Lowisa (1787-1842) and Hedda (1796-1834) married two brothers, Aron von Reis and Moses von Reis of the successful von Reis family of Gothenburg Jews.

A number of famous Swedes have descended from Marcus and his wife Fredrika Isaksdotter (1760-1826, originally Freideh Isaac), such as historian Hugo Valentin, TV producer Gunilla Marcus-Luboff, the Bonnier publishing dynasty, opera star Isa Quensel, industrialist Stefan Anderson, photographer Mattias Klum, pop entertainer Magnus Uggla. Usually, already the early descendants of Marcus and Isaksdotter married into Swedish families which were not Jewish. American botanist-author Siri von Reis in New York and daughter Serena Altschul also descend from Marcus. The marked gravestone of Jacob Marcus can still be seen in the Jewish Cemetery of Norrköping.

In 1900, a comprehensive account of the entire Marcus family and its descendants was published in Sweden as a large printed circular chart, and an extensive family roster was updated until 1942 by Curt Marcus. Beginning around that time, Jewish descent (no matter how diluted) was kept in low profile, especially during World War II, despite Sweden's neutrality.
