= Marstrand Synagogue =

- Swedish: Marstrands synagoga
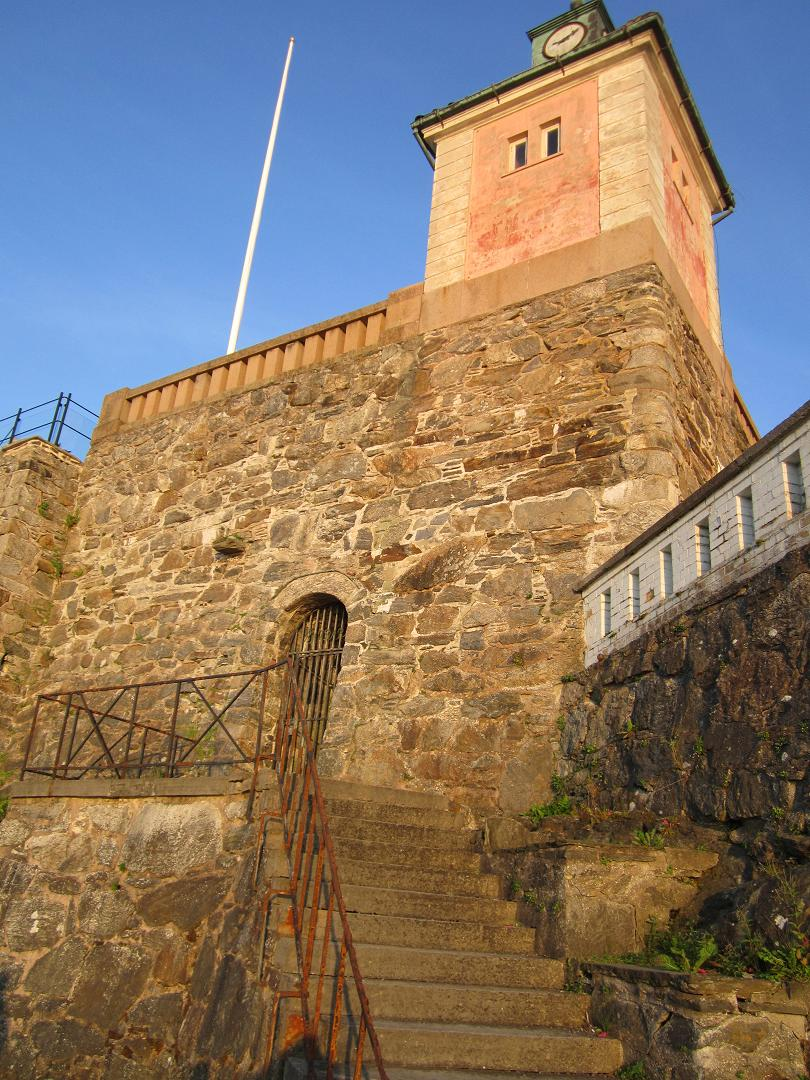

Religion
- Affiliation: Judaism
- Ecclesiastical or organizational status: Synagogue

Location
- Location: Marstrand, Kungälv Municipality

The Marstrand Synagogue (Swedish: Marstrands synagoga) was a synagogue located on Marstrand. It was established during the period of the Marstrand Free Port at the end of the 18th century.

In 1789, the synagogue had approximately 60 members.

In 2025, the Marstrand Synagogue was included in the Swedish Culture Canon.

== See also ==
- History of the Jews in Sweden
- List of synagogues in Sweden
