= Enis Maljici =

Swedish footballer

Personal information
- Full name: Enis Maljici
- Date of birth: 5 April 1994 (age 32)
- Place of birth: Sweden
- Height: 1.77 m (5 ft 9 1/2 in)
- Position: Midfielder

Team information
- Current team: Kortedala IF

Youth career
- –2008: Azalea BK
- 2009–2012: GAIS

Senior career*
Years	Team	Apps	(Gls)
2012–2013	GAIS	1	(0)
2013	→ Lärje/Angereds IF (loan)		
2014	Kortedala IF		
2015	Utsiktens BK	19	(0)
2016	Assyriska BK	17	(3)
2017–	Kortedala IF		
- * Club domestic league appearances and goals as of 2 April 2016

Enis Maljici (born 5 April 1994) is a Swedish footballer who plays for Kortedala IF as a midfielder.
