= Duvesjön =

- Location within Västra Götaland Location within Sweden
- Coordinates: 57°55′30″N 11°59′10″E
- Country: Sweden
- Province: Bohuslän
- County: Västra Götaland County
- Municipality: Kungälv Municipality

Area
  - Total: 0.41 km^{2} (0.16 sq mi)

Population (31 December 2010)
  - Total: 247
  - Density: 598/km^{2} (1,550/sq mi)
- Time zone: UTC+1 (CET)
  - Summer (DST): UTC+2 (CEST)

Duvesjön (or Slätten) is a locality situated in Kungälv Municipality, Västra Götaland County, Sweden with 247 inhabitants in 2010.
