= Andrés Vasquez =

Peruvian-born Swedish footballer (born 1987)

Personal information
- Full name: Andrés Javier Vasquez Rueda Pinto
- Date of birth: 16 July 1987 (age 39)
- Place of birth: Lima, Peru
- Height: 1.80 m (5 ft 11 in)
- Position: Midfielder

Youth career
- IF Stendy
- Bergsjö IF
- 1997–2004: IFK Göteborg

Senior career*
Years	Team	Apps	(Gls)
2005–2007	IFK Göteborg	40	(2)
2008–2011	FC Zürich	16	(2)
2011	→ Grasshopper (loan)	2	(0)
2011–2013	BK Häcken	8	(0)
2014–2015	FC Wil	23	(5)

International career
2002–2004	Sweden U17	13	(0)
2005–2006	Sweden U19	13	(1)
2006–2007	Sweden U21	4	(0)
- * Club domestic league appearances and goals

Andrés Javier Vasquez Rueda Pinto (born 16 July 1987) (often misspelled Vasques) is a Swedish former professional footballer who played as a midfielder.

== Club career ==
After playing for local clubs, he joined IFK Göteborg in 1997, the club he played for until January 2008.

He scored his first league goal for IFK Göteborg on 7 May 2007 against Örebro SK. The remarkable goal, a rabona kick from outside the penalty area, was by most experts seen as a candidate for the best goal of that year in Sweden.

In December 2007 Vasquez was signed by Swiss club FC Zürich on a 4-year-contract.

== International career ==
Andrés Vasquez rejected a call-up to the Peru national football team for a friendly with Costa Rica in March 2009 by coach José del Solar.

== Career statistics ==
=== Club ===
Club	Season	Dom. league		Dom. cup		Int. cup		Other		Total
Club	Season	App	Goals	App	Goals	App	Goals	App	Goals	App	Goals
IF Stendy, Bergsjö IF	–1996	Youth football
IFK Göteborg	1997–2004	Youth football
Total	1997–2004	Youth football
IFK Göteborg	2005	3	0	1	0	10	0	4	0	18	0
IFK Göteborg	2006	25	0	2	0	3	0	12	4	42	4
IFK Göteborg	2007	12	2	1	0	0	0	9	0	22	2
Total	2005–07	40	2	4	0	13	0	25	4	82	6
Career totals	2005–07	40	2	4	0	13	0	25	4	82	6

== Personal life ==
He also has a younger brother, Salvador Vasquez, who plays football for JK Nõmme Kalju.
