= Kode =

- Location within Västra Götaland Location within Sweden
- Coordinates: 57°56′N 11°51′E
- Country: Sweden
- Province: Bohuslän
- County: Västra Götaland County
- Municipality: Kungälv Municipality

Area
  - Total: 1.27 km^{2} (0.49 sq mi)

Population (31 December 2010)
  - Total: 1,380
  - Density: 1,084/km^{2} (2,810/sq mi)
- Time zone: UTC+1 (CET)
  - Summer (DST): UTC+2 (CEST)

Kode (Swedish pronunciation: [ˈkûːdɛ]) is a locality situated in Kungälv Municipality, Västra Götaland County, Sweden. It had 1,380 inhabitants in 2010.

== Sports ==
The following sports clubs are located in Kode:

- Kode IF
