= SKIF Semberija =

Swedish football club

- Full name: Serbiska KIF Semberija Göteborg
- Founded: 1992
- Ground: Bergsjövallen; Gothenburg; Sweden
- Chairman: Zoran Colic
- League: Division 4 Göteborg A
Home colours	Away colours

SKIF Semberija is a Swedish football club located in Gothenburg.

== Background ==
SKIF Semberija currently plays in Division 4 Göteborg A which is the sixth tier of Swedish football. They play their home matches at the Bergsjövallen in Göteborg.Semberija also have Junior team.Semberijas Junior team play division 3B.Also Semberijas young squad for boys who are birth 2009.That youth team plays in the medel serie and their first match is against Bk Häcken .

The club is affiliated to Göteborgs Fotbollförbund.

== Season to season ==
Season	Level	Division	Section	Position	Movements
2006*	Tier 8	Division 6	Göteborg A	8th	
2007	Tier 8	Division 6	Göteborg A	2nd	
2008	Tier 8	Division 6	Göteborg A	1st	Promoted
2009	Tier 7	Division 5	Göteborg A	1st	Promoted
2010	Tier 6	Division 4	Göteborg A	5th	
2011	Tier 6	Division 4	Göteborg A	1st	Promoted

* League restructuring in 2006 resulted in a new division being created at Tier 3 and subsequent divisions dropping a level.
