= Kode IF =

Swedish football club

- Full name: Kode Idrottsförening
- Founded: 1950
- Ground: Lunnevi; Kode; Sweden
- Chairman: Petter Wrenne
- League: Division 4 Göteborg A
Home colours

Kode IF is a Swedish football club located in Kode.

== Background ==
Kode IF currently plays in Division 4 Göteborg A which is the sixth tier of Swedish football. They play their home matches at the Lunnevi in Kode.

The club is affiliated to Göteborgs Fotbollförbund. Kode IF have competed in the Svenska Cupen on 9 occasions and have played 13 matches in the competition.

== Season to season ==
Season	Level	Division	Section	Position	Movements
2006	Tier 7	Division 5	Göteborg A	4th	
2007	Tier 7	Division 5	Göteborg A	3rd	
2008	Tier 7	Division 5	Göteborg A	1st	Promoted
2009	Tier 6	Division 4	Göteborg A	8th	
2010	Tier 6	Division 4	Göteborg A	5th	
2011	Tier 6	Division 4	Göteborg A	9th	

* League restructuring in 2006 resulted in a new division being created at Tier 3 and subsequent divisions dropping a level.
