= FC Gothia =

Swedish football club

FC Gothia was a planned new Swedish football club. It would have been created by merging three teams, Örgryte IS, GAIS and BK Häcken, all from Gothenburg. The clubs held a press conference on 14 September 2007, at which they presented their plans and announced that would start an inquiry. However, outside the press conference hundreds of angry supporters of the three teams had gathered showing their deep anger toward the plans. Later the same day the clubs decided not merge because of the strongly negative reactions of the fans. The club maintained in Brazzaville the youth football academy CF Gothia Brazzaville, which was founded 2003 by the Göteborgs Fotbollförbund.

The club was affiliated to the Göteborgs Fotbollförbund.
