= Marstrand Regatta =

Swedish sailing competition

- Organizer: Royal Gothenburg Yacht Club
- Venue: Marstrand, Sweden

The Marstrand Regatta (Swedish: Marstrandsregattan) is a sailing event. It is held outside Marstrand in Sweden in July, and hosted by the Royal Gothenburg Yacht Club.
