= Gothenburg Football Association =

Göteborgs Fotbollförbund
- Abbreviation: Göteborgs FF
- Purpose: District Football Association
- Location(s): Box 257 40124 Gothenburg Sweden
- Chairman: Bert Andersson
- Website: gbgfotboll.se

Göteborgs Fotbollförbund (Gothenburg Football Association) is one of the 24 district organisations of the Swedish Football Association. It administers lower tier football in Gothenburg and surrounding municipalities.

== Background ==
Göteborgs Fotbollförbund, commonly referred to as Göteborgs FF, is the governing body for football in the Gothenburg area. The Association currently has 235 member clubs. Based in Gothenburg, the Association's Chairman is Bert Andersson.

== Affiliated Members ==
The following clubs are affiliated to the Göteborgs FF:

- Ahlafors BK
- Ahlafors Idrottsförening
- AIF Göteborg
- Al-Furat Irakisk IF
- Al-Noor Förening
- Askims IK
- Assyriska BK
- Atlas FC
- Avenyn United Futsal Club
- Azalea BK
- Babylon SK
- Backatorp IF
- Balltorps FF
- Bergsjö IF
- Bergums IF
- Billdals BK
- Björndammens BK
- Bjurslätts IF
- BK Apslätten
- BK Bifrost
- BK Björkåsen
- BK Häcken
- BK Häcken DF
- BK Krabba
- BK Lobo
- BK Östergärde
- BK S:t Jakob
- BK Skjutet
- BK Tynnered
- BK Wobbler
- Blå Staden/Tingstads IF
- Bohus IF
- Bokedalens IF
- Bratstvo FF
- Croatia Göteborg
- Cruz Azul IF
- Dalen/Krokslätts FF
- Damavand IF
- Diseröd SK
- Donsö IS
- Elisedals IS
- Eriksbergs IF
- Evins KIF
- Fadini FF
- Färjenäs IF
- Fässbergs IF
- FC Ale
- FC Bosona
- FC Fiskebäck
- FC Göteborg United
- FC Gothia
- FC Heden
- FC Komarken
- FC Majorna
- FC Roma United
- FC Show
- FC Sparta
- Finlandia/Pallo Arvesgärde IF
- FK Lokomotiv Göteborg
- Floda BoIF
- Floda BoIF FC
- Football Club Gole
- Förenad Turkisk Ungdom
- Fotö GoIF
- Fräntorp Qviding IF
- Futsal Club Charrua
- Futsal Club Ibra
- Futsal Club Linné
- Futsal Club Tranquillo
- GAIS
- Gameoff IF
- Gårda BK
- Gårdstens IF
- Gårdstens MIK
- Götaholms BK
- Göteborg Sportsacademy IF
- Göteborgs AIK
- Göteborgs Bosna IF
- Göteborgs City FF
- Göteborgs FF
- Göteborgs Futsal Club
- Göteborgs SIF
- Gothenburg Celtic FC
- Gothia Futsal Förening
- Grimmereds BK
- Grunden BOIS
- Guldhedens IK
- Guldringens SK
- Gunnilse IS
- Hällesåker DIF
- Hällesåker IF
- Hallstenshagens FF
- Hälsö BK
- Hålta IK
- Härryda IF
- Hermansby IF
- Hisingsbacka DFK
- Hisingsbacka FC
- Hjuviks AIK
- Högaborg Kärralunds FC
- Hönö IS
- Hovås Billdal IF
- Hyppelns IK
- IF Angered United
- IF Hakoah
- IF Jedinstvo
- IF Mölndal Fotboll
- IF Stendy
- IF Vardar/Makedonija
- IF Väster
- IF Warta
- IFK Björkö
- IFK Göteborg
- IFK Hällingsjö
- IFK Hindås
- IFK Mölndal
- IK Kongahälla
- IK Surd
- IK Virgo
- IK Zenith
- Irakiska IK
- Järnbrotts IF
- Jitex BK
- Jitex DFF
- Jitex FC
- Jonsereds IF
- Kållered SK
- Kalvsunds IF
- Kap Verde IF
- Kareby IS
- Käringöns FC
- Kärra KIF
- Kaverös BK
- KF Velebit
- Knippla IK
- Kode IF
- Kopparbergs/Göteborg FC
- Kortedala IF
- Kungälvs FF
- Kungsladugårds BK
- Kurdistan IK
- Landala IF
- Landvetter IF
- Landvetter IS
- Lärje-Angereds IF
- Låtta Marta IF
- Lekstorps IF
- Lerums Futsal Club
- Lerums IS
- Lindholmens/Länsmansgårdens BK
- Lindome GIF
- Lövet/Johannebergs IF
- Lundby IF 06
- Lunden Överås BK
- Majorna BK
- Majornas IK
- Marieholm BoIK
- Masthuggets BK
- Menisken IF
- Midnimo IF
- Mölnlycke BK
- Mölnlycke IF
- Mölnlycke IS
- Mossens BK
- Mossens FC
- Näsets IK
- Näsets SK
- Neutrala IF
- Nödinge SK
- Nol IK
- Palestinska IF
- Partille IF
- Persepolis FF
- Proletären FF
- Pushers BK
- Qviding FIF
- Rambergets SK
- Rannebergens IF
- Rävlanda AIS
- Real Maskin BK
- Rödbo IF
- Romelanda UF
- Rörö IF
- S:t Malke IF
- Sandarna BK
- Sannegårdens IF
- Säve SK
- Sävedalens IF
- Serbiska KIF Semberija Göteborg
- SF Sindjelic
- Sjövalla FK
- Sjöviks SK
- SK Argo
- SK Höjden Göteborg
- Skogens IF
- Skogshyddans IS-Helböhmen FCK
- Slottsskogen/Godhem IF
- Smirket United FC
- Södra Skärgården IK
- Solängens BK
- Solväders FC
- Somalia SK
- Somalisk Banadir IF
- Somalisk Vikingar IS
- Stenkullens GOIK
- Styrsö BK
- Surte IS FK
- Svensk-Somaliska VF
- Syrianska IF Angered
- Syrianska/Arameiska Föreningen Göteborg
- Team Utbynäs DFF
- Tollereds IF
- Torslanda FC
- Torslanda IK
- Tuve IF
- United Africa FC
- Utbynäs SK
- Utsiktens BK
- Västkustens BK
- Västra Frölunda IF
- Vrångö IF
- Ytterby FC
- Ytterby IS
- Älvängens IK
- Älvsborg FF
- Öckerö BK
- Öckerö IF
- Öjersjö BK
- Öjersjö IF
- Olskrokens IF
- Önnereds IK
- Örgryte Fotboll AB
- Örgryte IS
- Ösets BK

== League Competitions ==
Göteborgs FF run the following League Competitions:

=== Men's Football ===
Division 4 - two sections
Division 5 - two sections
Division 6 - four sections
Division 7 - four sections

=== Women's Football ===
Division 3 - one section
Division 4 - two sections
Division 5 - one section
