= Diseröd =

- Location within Västra Götaland Location within Sweden
- Coordinates: 57°55′N 12°01′E
- Country: Sweden
- Province: Bohuslän
- County: Västra Götaland County
- Municipality: Kungälv Municipality

Area
  - Total: 0.75 km^{2} (0.29 sq mi)
- Elevation: 58 m (190 ft)

Population (31 December 2010)
  - Total: 1,241
  - Density: 1,656/km^{2} (4,290/sq mi)
- Time zone: UTC+1 (CET)
  - Summer (DST): UTC+2 (CEST)

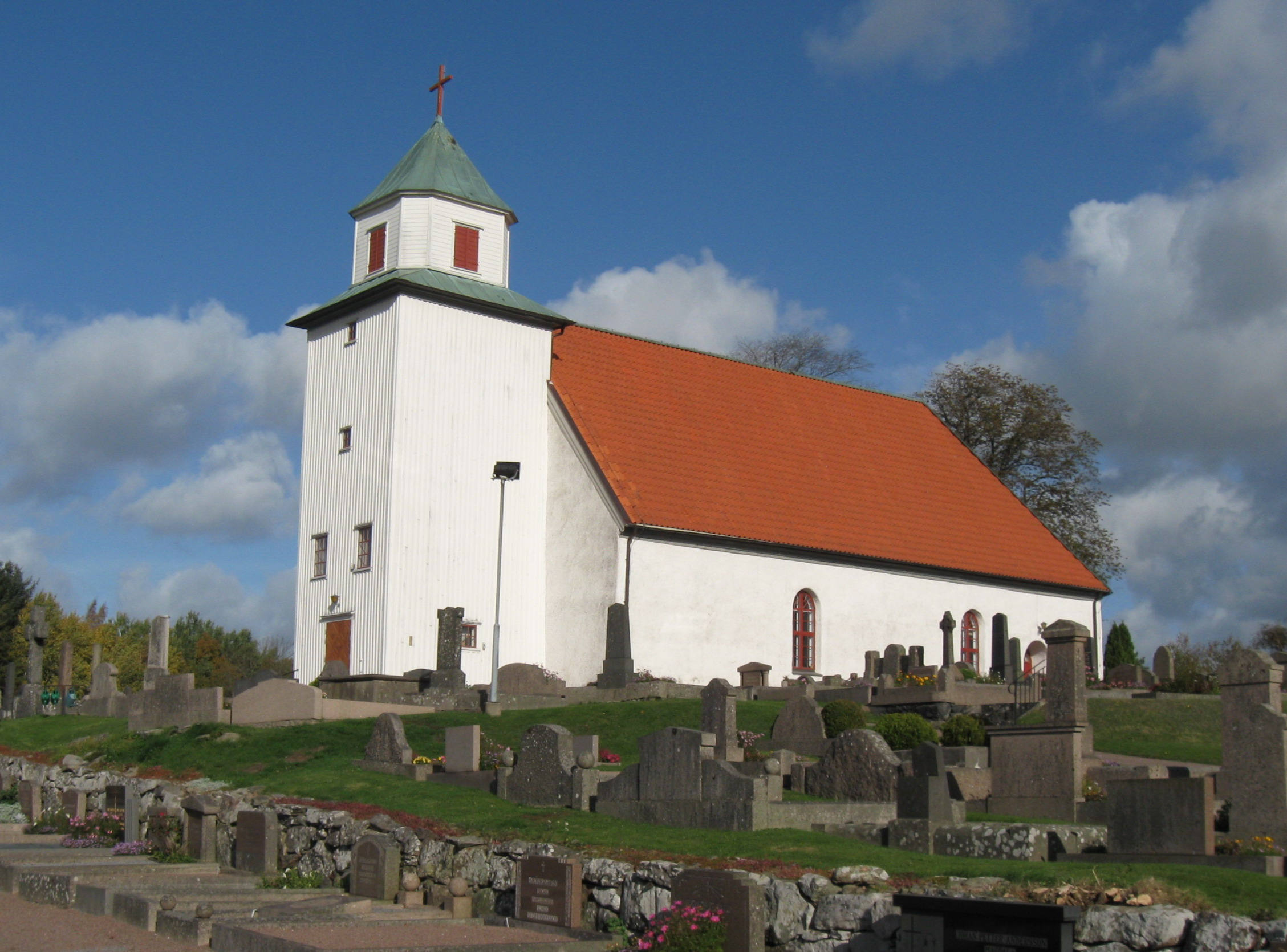
Romelanda church seen from the southwest

Diseröd is a locality situated in Kungälv Municipality, Västra Götaland County, Sweden. It had 1,241 inhabitants in 2010.
