= Kärna =

- Location within Västra Götaland Location within Sweden
- Coordinates: 57°51′N 11°47′E
- Country: Sweden
- Province: Bohuslän
- County: Västra Götaland County
- Municipality: Kungälv Municipality

Area
  - Total: 0.45 km^{2} (0.17 sq mi)

Population (31 December 2010)
  - Total: 430
  - Density: 951/km^{2} (2,460/sq mi)
- Time zone: UTC+1 (CET)
  - Summer (DST): UTC+2 (CEST)

Kärna is a locality situated in Kungälv Municipality, Västra Götaland County, Sweden. It had 430 inhabitants in 2010.
