= Kortedala IF =

Swedish football club

- Full name: Kortedala Idrottsförening
- Ground: Kortedalavallen; Gothenburg; Sweden
- Chairman: Göte Westh
- League: Division 3 Nordvästra Götaland
- 2019: Division 4 Göteborg A, 2nd (Promotion Playoffs – Promoted)
Home colours	Away colours

Kortedala IF is a Swedish football club located in Gothenburg.

== Background ==
Kortedala IF currently plays in Division 4 Göteborg A which is the sixth tier of Swedish football. They play their home matches at the Kortedalavallen in Göteborg.

The club is affiliated to Göteborgs Fotbollförbund. Kortedala IF have competed in the Svenska Cupen on 18 occasions and have played 37 matches in the competition.

== Season to season ==
In their most successful period Kortedala IF competed in the following divisions:

Season	Level	Division	Section	Position	Movements
1981	Tier 4	Division 4	Göteborg A	1st	Promoted
1982	Tier 3	Division 3	Mellersta Götaland	6th	
1983	Tier 3	Division 3	Sydvästra Götaland	8th	
1984	Tier 3	Division 3	Sydvästra Götaland	12th	Relegated
1985	Tier 4	Division 4	Göteborg B	2nd	
1986	Tier 4	Division 4	Göteborg B	1st	
1987*	Tier 4	Division 3	Nordvästra Götaland	6th	
1988	Tier 4	Division 3	Nordvästra Götaland	10th	Relegated

*League restructuring in 1987 resulted in Division 1 being created at Tier 2 and subsequent divisions dropping a level.

In recent seasons Kortedala IF have competed in the following divisions:

Season	Level	Division	Section	Position	Movements
2006*	Tier 7	Division 5	Göteborg A	1st	Promoted
2007	Tier 6	Division 4	Göteborg A	6th	
2008	Tier 6	Division 4	Göteborg A	8th	
2009	Tier 6	Division 4	Göteborg A	12th	Relegated
2010	Tier 7	Division 5	Göteborg A	1st	Promoted
2011	Tier 6	Division 4	Göteborg A	2nd	Promotion Playoffs
2012	Tier 6	Division 4	Göteborg A	4th	
2013	Tier 6	Division 4	Göteborg A	2nd	Promotion Playoffs – Promoted
2014	Tier 5	Division 3	Nordvästra Götaland	2nd	Promotion Playoffs – Promoted
2015	Tier 4	Division 2	Västra Götaland	10th	
2016	Tier 4	Division 2	Norra Götaland	14th	Relegated
2017	Tier 5	Division 3	Nordvästra Götaland	12th	Relegated
2018	Tier 6	Division 4	Göteborg A	6th	
2019	Tier 6	Division 4	Göteborg A	2nd	Promotion Playoffs – Promoted
2020	Tier 5	Division 3	Nordvästra Götaland		

* League restructuring in 2006 resulted in a new division being created at Tier 3 and subsequent divisions dropping a level.

== Attendances ==
In recent seasons Kortedala IF have had the following average attendances:

Season	Average attendance	Division / Section	Level
2010	58	Div 5 Göteborg A	Tier 7
2011	60	Div 4 Göteborg A	Tier 6
2012	68	Div 4 Göteborg A	Tier 6
2013	49	Div 4 Göteborg A	Tier 6
2014	132	Div 3 Nordvästra Götaland	Tier 5
2015	122	Div 2 Västra Götaland	Tier 4
2016	89	Div 2 Norra Götaland	Tier 4
2017	73	Div 3 Nordvästra Götaland	Tier 5

* Attendances are provided in the Publikliga sections of the Svenska Fotbollförbundet website.
