= Bergsjö IF =

Swedish football club

- Full name: Bergsjö Idrottsförening
- Founded: 1964
- Ground: Bergsjövallen; Bergsjö; Sweden
- Chairman: Jesper Rosenfeldt
- Head coach: Kara Ayan
- Coach: Emre Vatansever
- League: Division 4 Göteborg A
Home colours

Bergsjö IF is a Swedish football club located in Bergsjö.

== Background ==
Bergsjö IF currently plays in Division 4 Göteborg A which is the sixth tier of Swedish football. They play their home matches at the Bergsjövallen in Göteborg.

The club is affiliated to Göteborgs Fotbollförbund. Bergsjö IF have competed in the Svenska Cupen on 8 occasions and have played 12 matches in the competition.

== Season to season ==
In their most successful period Bergsjö IF competed in the following divisions:

Season	Level	Division	Section	Position	Movements
1974	Tier 5	Division 5	Göteborg A		Promoted
1975	Tier 4	Division 4	Göteborg A	8th	
1976	Tier 4	Division 4	Göteborg A	6th	
1977	Tier 4	Division 4	Göteborg A	9th	
1978	Tier 4	Division 4	Göteborg A	11th	Relegated
1979	Tier 5	Division 5	Göteborg A		Promoted
1980	Tier 4	Division 4	Göteborg A	10th	
1981	Tier 4	Division 4	Göteborg A	10th	
1982	Tier 4	Division 4	Göteborg A	7th	
1983	Tier 4	Division 4	Göteborg A	12th	Relegated

In recent seasons Bergsjö IF have competed in the following divisions:

Season	Level	Division	Section	Position	Movements
2006*	Tier 6	Division 4	Göteborg A	12th	Relegated
2007	Tier 7	Division 5	Göteborg A	6th	
2008	Tier 7	Division 5	Göteborg A	5th	
2009	Tier 7	Division 5	Göteborg A	5th	
2010	Tier 7	Division 5	Göteborg A	3rd	Promoted
2011	Tier 6	Division 4	Göteborg A	8th	

* League restructuring in 2006 resulted in a new division being created at Tier 3 and subsequent divisions dropping a level.
