= Kungälv Municipality =

Kungälv Municipality Kungälvs kommun
- Municipality
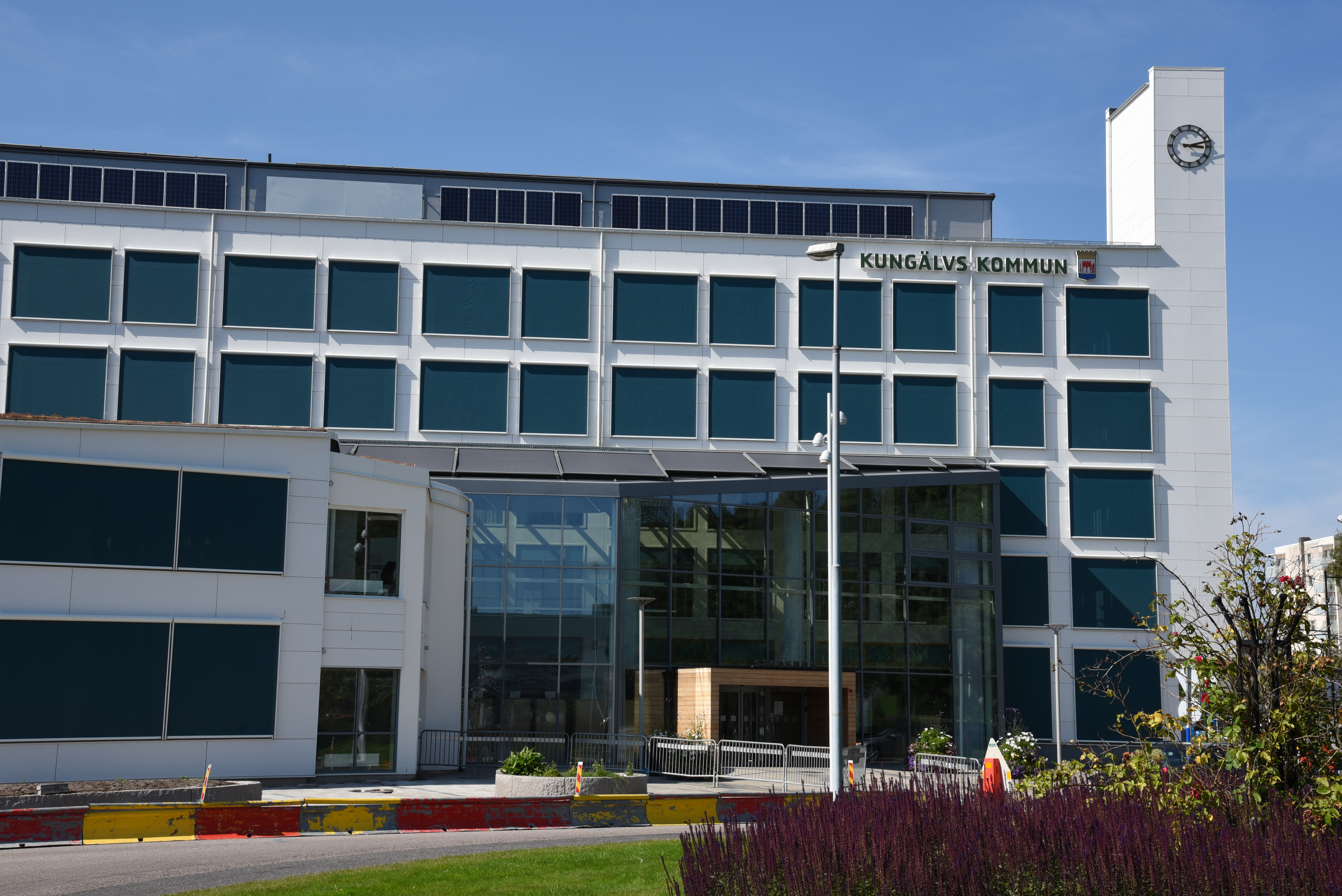
- Kungälv City Hall

- Coat of arms

- Coordinates: 57°52′N 11°58′E
- Country: Sweden
- County: Västra Götaland County
- Seat: Kungälv

Area
  - Total: 682.43 km^{2} (263.49 sq mi)
  - Land: 362.59 km^{2} (140.00 sq mi)
  - Water: 319.84 km^{2} (123.49 sq mi)
- Area as of 1 January 2014.

Population (30 June 2025)
  - Total: 50,507
  - Density: 139.30/km^{2} (360.77/sq mi)
- Time zone: UTC+1 (CET)
  - Summer (DST): UTC+2 (CEST)
- ISO 3166 code: SE
- Province: Bohuslän
- Municipal code: 1482
- Website: www.kungalv.se

Kungälv Municipality (Swedish: Kungälvs kommun) is a municipality in Västra Götaland County in western Sweden. Its seat is located in the city of Kungälv. It is the 50th largest municipality in Sweden by population size, which exceeded 50 000 during May 2024.

The present municipality was formed in 1971 through the amalgamation of the City of Kungälv, the City of Marstrand and territories belonging to four rural municipalities. In 1974 a minor part (situated on the island of Hisingen) was transferred to Gothenburg Municipality.

== Geography ==
Geographically it borders to Gothenburg Municipality (south), Ale Municipality (east), Lilla Edet Municipality (north-east) and Stenungsund Municipality (north). To the east flows the river Göta älv and to the south, marking the border to Gothenburg, flows the river Nordre älv. On an island in the river, the medieval Bohus Fortress faces the city of Kungälv.

=== Localities ===
- Marstrand, which was historically a largely autonomous island territory as the Marstrand Free Port. It's the location of the stone fortress Carlsten.
- Diseröd
- Kareby
- Kode
- Kungälv
- Kärna
- Solberga, where the oldest parts of the church dates back to the 12th century
- Årsnäs
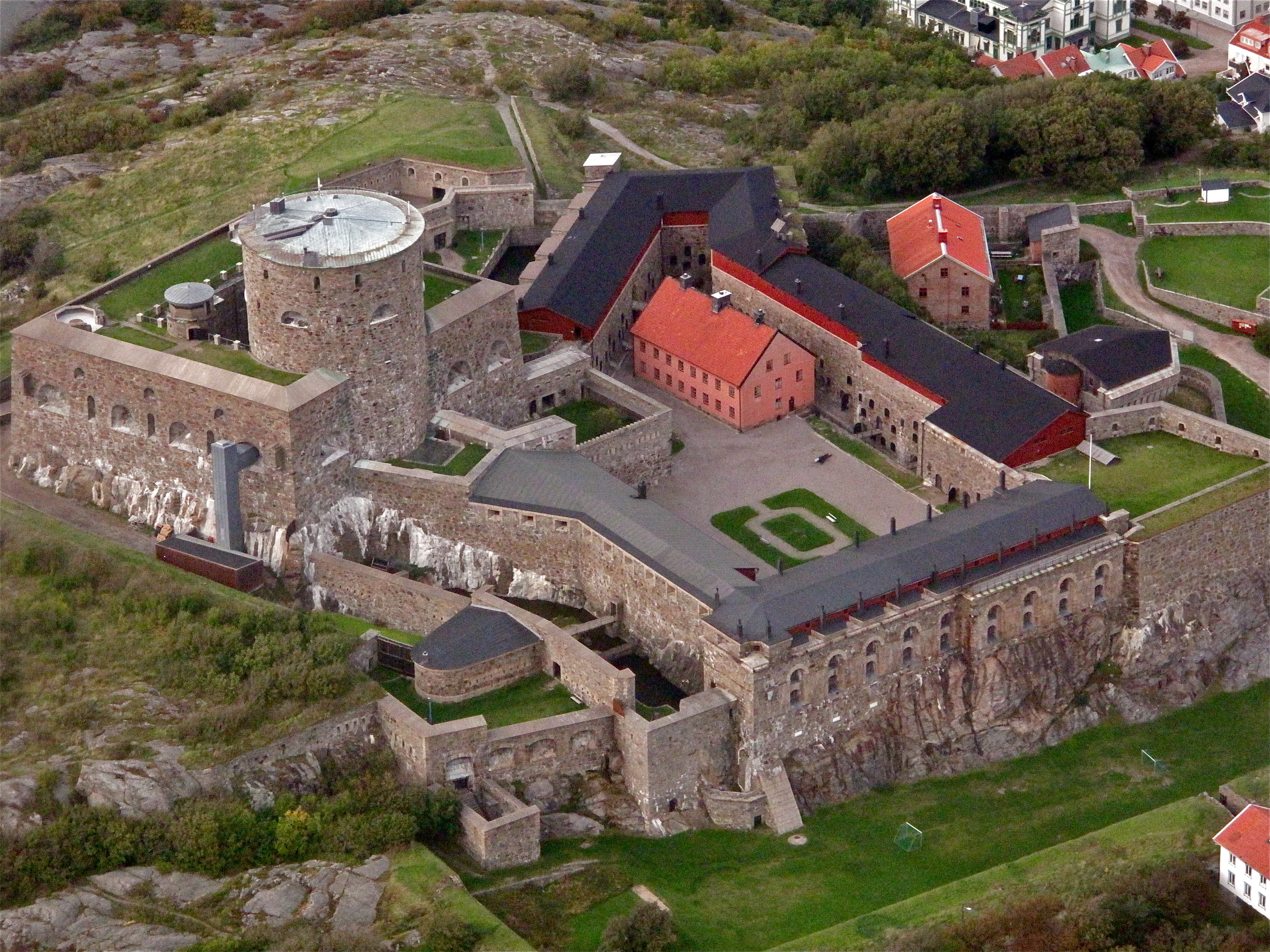
Carlsten, Marstrand

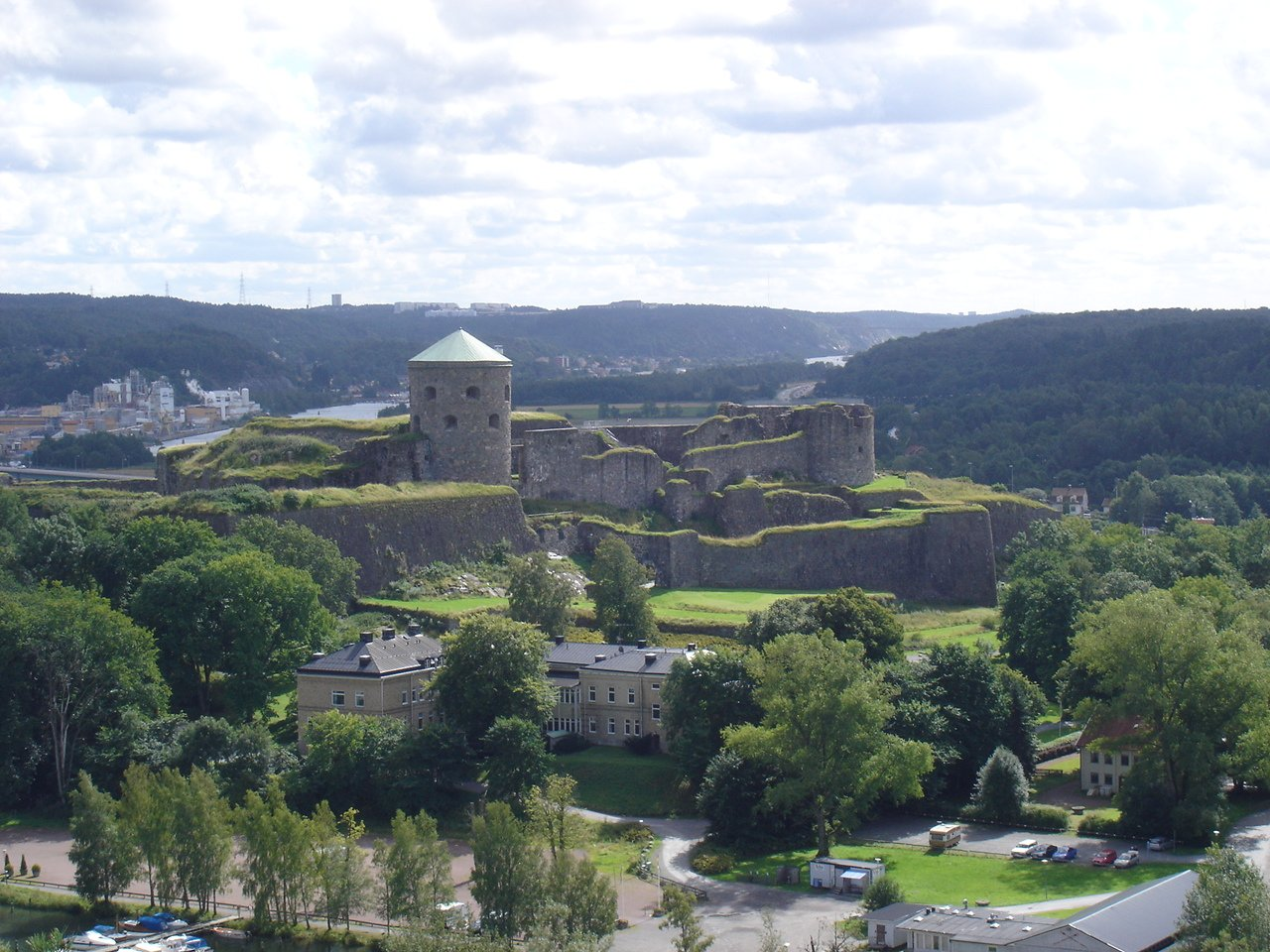
Bohus Fortress, Kungälv

== Demographics ==
This is a demographic table based on Kungälv Municipality's electoral districts in the 2022 Swedish general election sourced from SVT's election platform, in turn taken from SCB official statistics.

In total there were 48,219 residents, including 36,298 Swedish citizens of voting age. 43.6 % voted for the left coalition and 54.9 % for the right coalition. Indicators are in percentage points except population totals and income.

Location	Residents	Citizen adults	Left vote	Right vote	Employed	Swedish parents	Foreign heritage	Income SEK	Degree
Location			%	%					
Aröd-Skålldal	1,424	1,132	35.3	63.0	89	93	7	29,533	37
Centrum	1,380	1,218	48.5	50.7	81	88	12	24,728	45
Diseröd-Dösebacka	1,904	1,341	43.3	54.4	88	85	15	29,608	41
Fontin-Gamla Staden	1,532	1,215	45.1	53.6	82	83	17	29,004	46
Fridhem-Tveten	1,894	1,428	52.7	46.4	84	85	15	27,749	49
Harestad	1,117	827	42.2	57.1	89	89	11	30,121	38
Hålta-Lökeberg	1,309	1,016	39.8	59.2	87	92	8	31,111	43
Kareby-Ullstorp	1,970	1,356	39.1	59.9	91	90	10	34,842	48
Kode	1,590	1,095	40.9	58.3	89	89	11	30,793	46
Komarken N-G:a Grinden	1,902	1,440	55.8	42.2	76	63	37	24,391	38
Komarken S-Grinden	1,595	1,265	47.1	51.0	86	86	14	31,809	52
Komarken V	1,621	1,200	53.8	43.1	72	56	44	22,773	28
Komarken Ö	1,072	900	52.0	44.9	74	73	27	22,723	34
Kovikshamn-Glose	1,836	1,476	43.4	55.4	86	92	8	29,808	46
Kärna-Staby	2,038	1,450	40.7	57.7	87	90	10	30,321	41
Lundby-Skårby-Arnebo	1,552	1,154	39.4	59.4	90	93	7	31,261	38
Marstrand	1,408	1,272	32.7	66.2	82	92	8	29,967	52
Munkegärde	1,863	1,394	46.7	52.6	88	83	17	30,022	44
Rollsbo-Bredsten	1,239	969	44.6	53.3	89	89	11	32,664	55
Sadelmakaren-Reparatören	1,193	1,035	52.4	46.0	76	82	18	22,095	37
Skälebräcke-Kongahälla	2,557	2,113	43.6	55.0	86	80	20	29,309	42
Solberg-Duvesjön	1,677	1,233	38.0	60.5	88	88	12	30,302	39
Solberga-Rörtången	1,676	1,277	40.8	58.5	89	93	7	32,126	45
Sparrås-Tornhaga	1,880	1,334	47.3	51.2	82	87	13	28,865	47
Tega-Vena-Ulvesund	2,781	2,108	40.1	58.2	89	88	12	33,640	54
Tjuvkil-Instön-Tofta	2,073	1,656	38.2	60.8	88	93	7	33,787	50
Ulvegärde-Solbräcke	2,112	1,446	42.0	56.1	84	82	18	30,291	45
Ytterby C-Kastellegården	2,024	1,578	47.1	50.7	84	83	17	25,940	44
Source: SVT
