= Marstrand =

- Locality
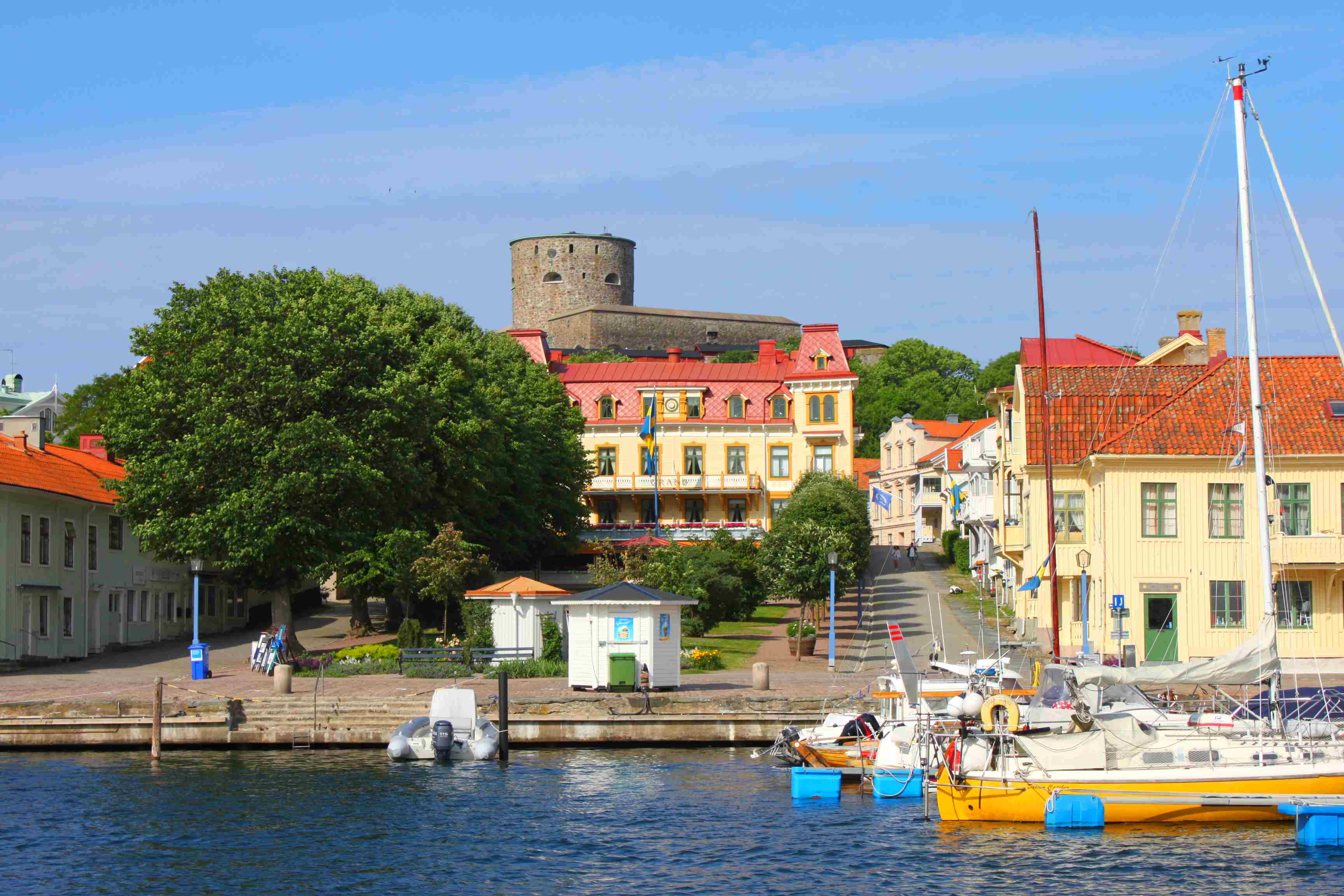
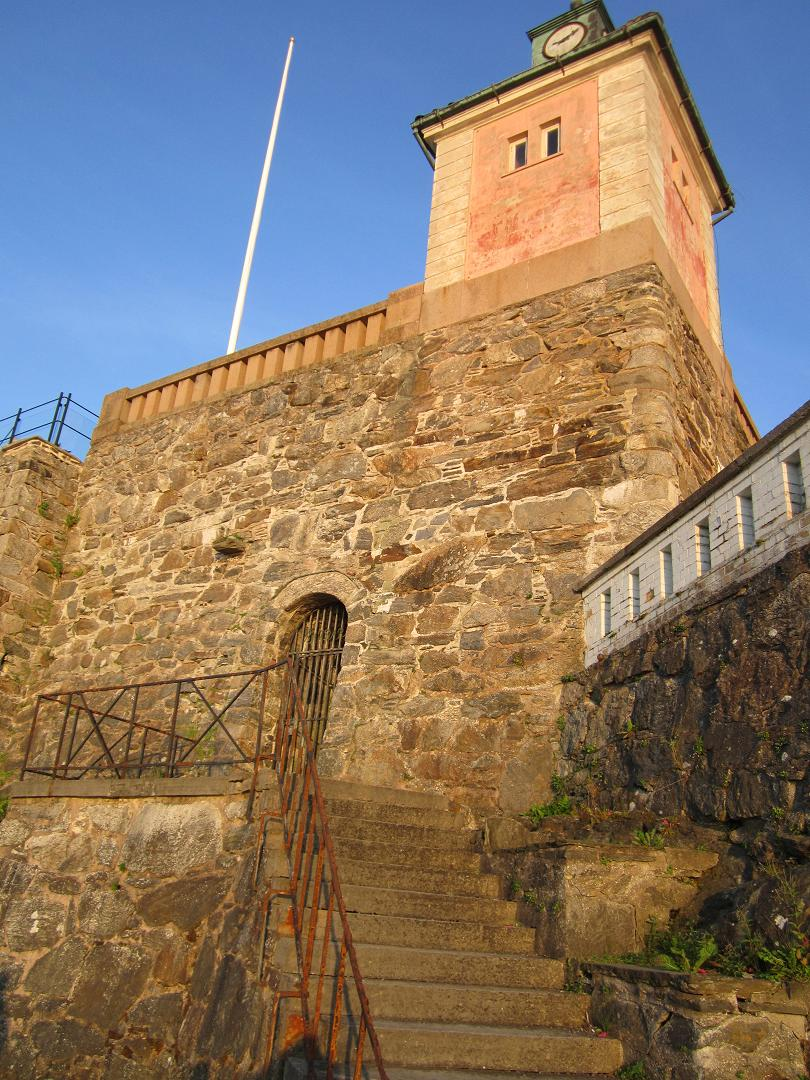
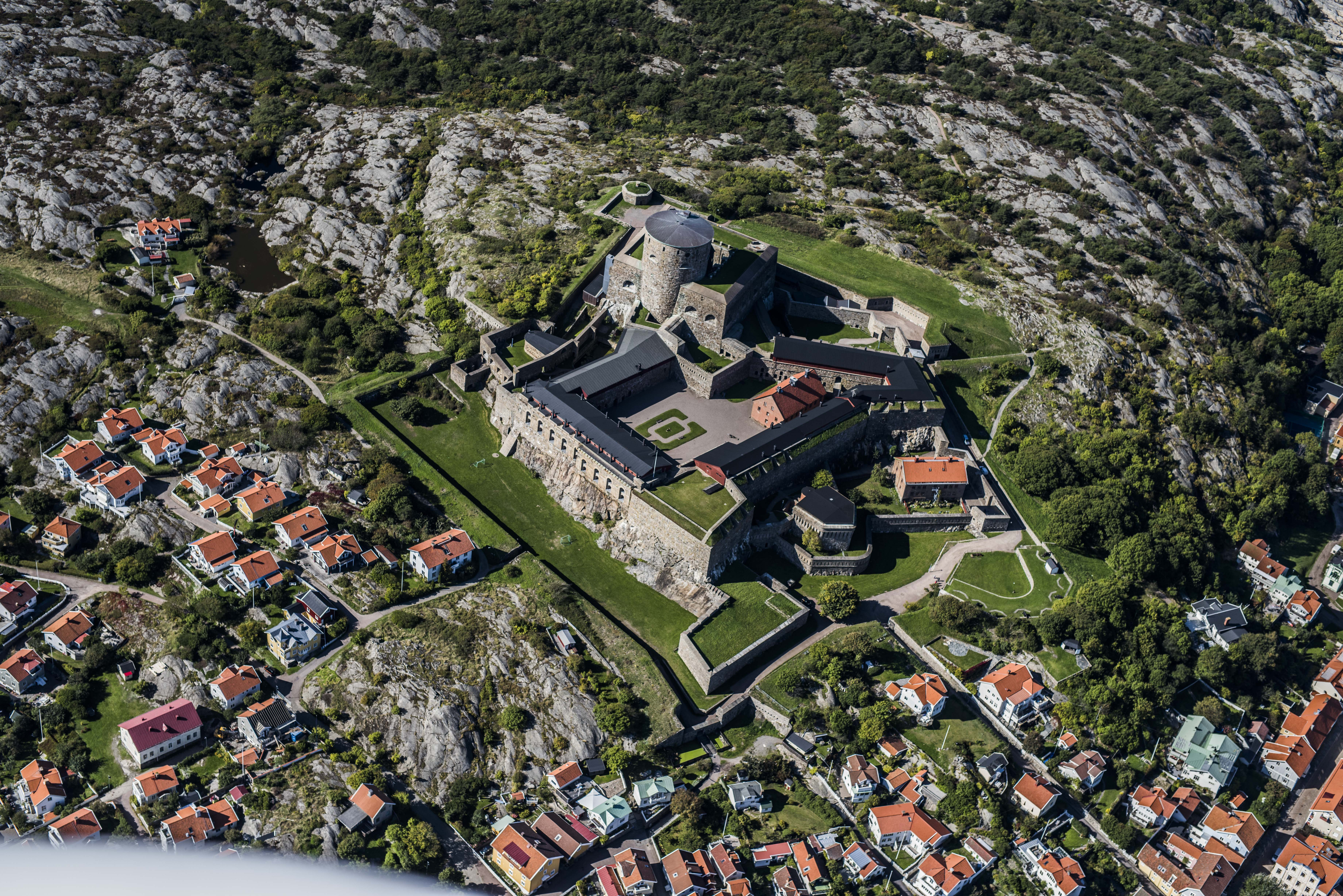

- Location within Västra Götaland Location within Sweden
- Coordinates: 57°53′N 11°35′E
- Country: Sweden
- Province: Bohuslän
- County: Västra Götaland County
- Municipality: Kungälv Municipality

Area
  - Total: 0.88 km^{2} (0.34 sq mi)

Population (31 December 2010)
  - Total: 1,319
  - Density: 1,507/km^{2} (3,900/sq mi)
- Time zone: UTC+1 (CET)
  - Summer (DST): UTC+2 (CEST)

Marstrand (Swedish pronunciation: [ˈmâʂːtrand]) is a seaside locality situated in Kungälv Municipality, Västra Götaland County, Sweden. It had 1,320 inhabitants in 2010. The town got its name from its location on the island of Marstrand. Despite its small population, for historical reasons Marstrand is often referred to as a city.

The city had free port status, which was declared by King Gustav III, from 1775 to 1794. Religious liberty established by the same sovereign allowed an early Swedish congregation of Jews to be established there in 1775 and one of Scandinavia's first synagogues was set up in Fort Fredriksborg in 1780, making the village a notable site to the history of the Jews in Sweden.

Following the abolishment of the free port status and the decline of herring fishing, Marstrand established itself as a seaside resort in the 19th century.

Important annual sporting events held in Marstrand include the Stena Match Cup Sweden and Marstrand Regatta. Marstrand is known as a playground for celebrities and wealthy Swedish residents alike, who come in the summer for the sea, shopping and the nightlife.

== History ==
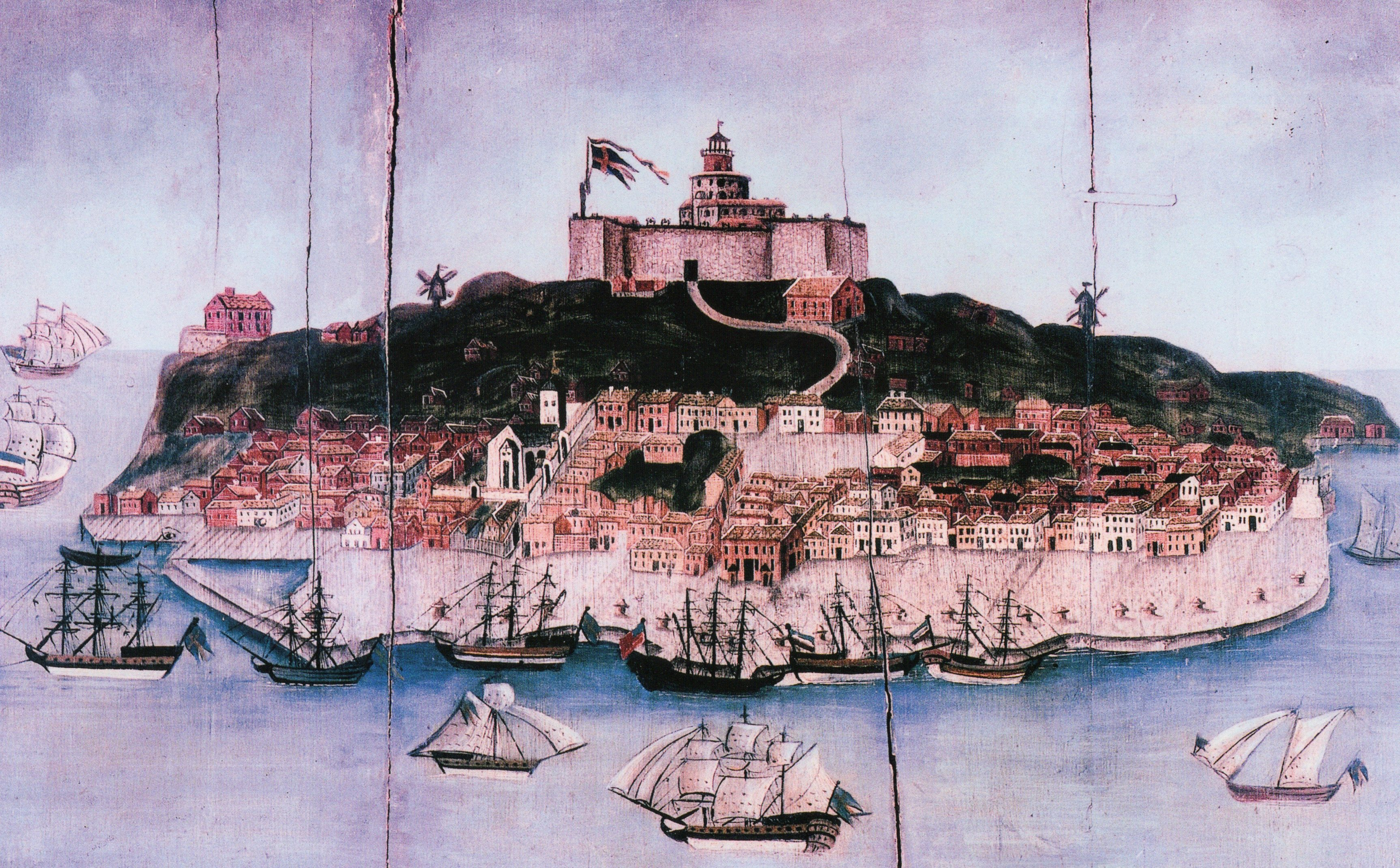
The island around 1775

Marstrand has held city privileges since 1200. The most striking feature of Marstrand is the 17th-century fortress Carlsten, named for King Charles X Gustav of Sweden.

During the last quarter of the 18th century Marstrand had free port status granted by King Gustav III.

In the 1790s, the Jewish inhabitants of Marstrand numbered around 60 individuals at its peak Jewish population time. In 1805, all the Jews, except for one family, had left Marstrand for Gothenburg. Notable families of the Marstrand Jewish community were the Henriques, Delbanco, Warburg, von Reis and Magnus families.

Administratively Marstrand with immediately surrounding islands was a municipality of its own until the local government reform of 1971 when it was merged into Kungälv Municipality.

In 1969, around 200 stateless Polish Jews arrived there.

== Sports ==
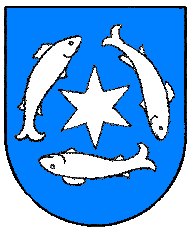
Arms; incorporated with Kungälv Municipality in 1971

=== Sailing ===
Being an island makes Marstrand popular for sailing and boat races.

Marstrand is the host venue for Match Cup Sweden, part of the World Match Racing Tour. The event draws international sailing teams to Marstrand. DS-37 boats are raced two at a time. Points accrued count towards the World Match Racing Tour and a place in the final event, with the overall winner taking the title ISAF World Match Racing Tour Champion. Match racing is well suited to Marstand. Highlights of the events are broadcast on Eurosport television and via the official World Match Racing Tour website.

== See also ==
- Marstrand Free Port
