= Marstrand Free Port =

18c. Swedish autonomous island territory

Marstrand Free Port Frihamnen Marstrand
- 1775–1794
- Coat of arms
- Status: Free port of Sweden
- Capital: Marstrand
- Government: Republic
- Historical era: Enlightenment
  - Established: 1775
  - Disestablished: 1794
Preceded by	Succeeded by
History of Sweden (1772–1809)	History of Sweden (1772–1809)
- The anachronistic coat of arms is based on the town's medieval sigil, in use during the free port era.

The Marstrand Free Port (Swedish: Frihamnen Marstrand) was a largely autonomous island territory of Sweden, during the Gustavian Era of the late 18th century, which effectively functioned as a merchant republic. As a free port designed with inspiration from the Italian porto Franco and declared in 1775 by King Gustav III, it became an urban centre of commerce both legal and illegal, refuge of political and religious dissidents, and hideout of wanted criminals.

An experiment in free trade principles, as opposed to the mercantilist state policy of the era, the Marstrand Free Port was an economic success although most of the income went into private hands, rather than the state. However, its autonomous status was still revoked in 1794 after nearly two decades, following complaints from its burghers.

== History ==
=== Background ===
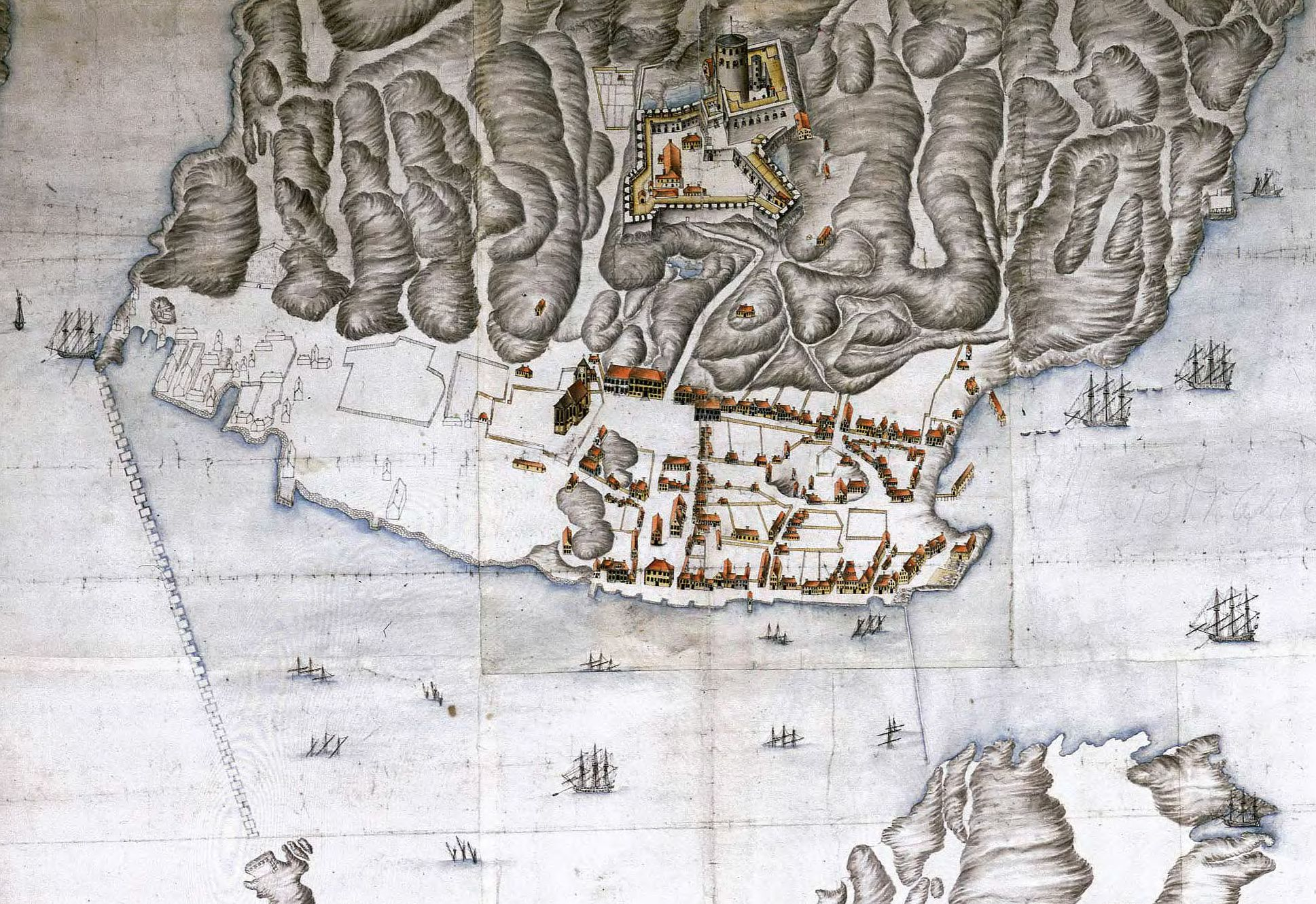
Danish battle map of Marstrand, 1719

Marstrand, a medieval island-based town in the formerly-Norwegian Bohuslän province, became Swedish with the Treaty of Roskilde in 1658. The same year, the mighty Carlsten Fortress was constructed, a penal fortification that came to dominate the port. In the mid-18th century, the most immense of the region's centennial "herring periods" – a seasonal surge of Atlantic herring in near-limitless amounts – brought on a boom in Marstrand's economy. It became a primary site of commerce for the massive herring industry, which for some time provided Sweden's second largest export (after the iron industry).

The idea of a free port in Marstrand had long roots. With a history of state-sanctioned privateering, Marstrand became a prospective site for a pirate haven in the early 18th century. King Charles XII, who spent most of his time in power waging the Great Northern War with all neighbouring states, received an offer from pirates sailing off Madagascar to resettle some them in Sweden in return for compensation, their ships joining the Royal Navy, with those remaining behind forming a Swedish colony. While little came of this, the proposed project set the stage for further experimental ideas in Marstrand.

The very first proposal for a Swedish free port ("porto franco", based on the original Italian model, later developed throughout Western Europe) came in 1712, likewise during the reign of Charles XII, in regards to Slite (on the Baltic Sea coast of the island Gotland). In 1747, amid the parliamentary chaos of the Age of Liberty when the rivalling Hats and Caps battled for supremacy in the Riksdag, some of the burghers of Marstrand made their own first proposal, asking that their town be given free port privileges. In the process leading up to this, the burghers had attempted to build support for their idea, for example trying to persuade of the famous naturalist Carl Linnaeus (a noted proponent of autarky), at the time travelling through the area, to lobby for their cause. Among the supporters of the proposal were many leading figures of the Swedish East India Company, such the Arvidsson merchants (who had investments in Marstrand) and Pon Quyqua, a Qing dynasty mandarin living in Gothenburg as an advisor of the East India Company.

Following the failure of this, further proposals came in 1762 and 1771, both times proposing the joint free port status of Marstrand, the previously mentioned Slite, and Visby (the capital of Gotland, and during the medieval period a Baltic merchant republic). In 1775 the plan finally bore fruit, in part due to the efforts of King Louis XV in previous years towards influencing the young Crown Prince Gustav in favour of the idea, as it was beneficial to France's economic interests. In 1772, with French backing, the newly crowned Gustav III launched the Revolution of 1772, a bloodless coup d'état that overthrew the Riksdag and established the rule of would-be enlightened absolutism.

=== Porto Franco ===
On 15 August 1775, Gustav III, writing from Ekolsund Castle, announced the charter of the Marstrand Free Port. The document was countersigned by Johan Liljencrantz (sv), the King's Minister of Finance and a proponent of anti-mercantilist reform, who in 1774 had supported the proposal together with King Louis XV and the Swedish East India Company's leadership. Half a year after this declaration, the College of Commerce announced the exact administrative details of the Free Port.

As a result of his involvement in creating the Free Port, Gustav III became vastly popular among the members of its upper class, as was evident in the spectacular celebration of his son (the later Gustav IV Adolf) in 1778. When visiting Marstrand in 1784, the autocratic king, who faced significant political resistance from many in Sweden, was warmly welcomed by Colonel Müller (Commandant of Carlsten Fortress), Mayor Ekström, the Council of Burghers, and many wealthy merchants.

In 1784, as a consequence of commercial agreements with France, Gustav III gained the Caribbean island colony Saint Barthélemy and engaged in the slave trade to which the Bohuslän herring industry had ties as well. The island, which remained Swedish until 1878, was declared a porto Franco, which was inspired by and largely used the same principles as the Marstrand Free Port.

==== Trade ====
At the core of the Marstrand Free Port laid regulations for its commerce to be "free and unrestricted", completely free of taxation and tolls, while all goods leaving the port for the mainland had to go through the same high tolls as all foreign imports in Sweden, practically making Marstrand foreign territory from an economic point of view. To defend the town's borders and restrict illegal commerce, extensive measures were taken. The harbours were sealed off and watched by toll inspectors at two separate stations, watchmen were on post at two outlying islands to crack down on smuggling, soldiers from Carlsten Fortress were on patrol across the island, a special patrol boat constantly searched the nearby straits, and the main inland road had guardsmen posted. No one could enter the Free Port without proper identification and entry papers.

The taxation-free shipping to Marstrand brought in many foreign ships, from all over the continent. French, Spanish and British ships all converged there, side by side with large East Indiamen. During the late 1770s, the trade was so extensive the town wharf had to be significantly expanded. During the American Revolutionary War, dozens of American cargo ships docked there, and the trans-Atlantic trade became incredibly profitable because of Sweden's neutral but friendly relations in regards to the nascent United States. Combined with the massive herring industry, this made Marstrand's burghers very wealthy.

In addition to the free exchange of goods, a freedom of profession was likewise introduced. Within the Free Port, the old system of mandatory guild membership was abolished and so inhabitants could ply whatever trade they wished without restriction. There was likewise no market regulations in regards to pricing. No taxation existed, with the exception of certain fees on food and drink.

==== Government ====
Marstrand remained a Swedish town, governed by Swedish law, but had almost complete local autonomy and was ruled by a Council of Burghers (Swedish: Borgarråd) influenced by the republican standing of the Italian porto francos and chaired by a mayor. The council was soon appointed by the inhabitants through elections, and in its role as the "town elders", it had the right to decide all ongoing affairs. It had twenty-four members, six of which were up for yearly re-elections. Eighteen of the Councillors had to be native Sweden, but the rest could be foreigners if they possessed property worth at least 1,000 riksdaler and had resided in Marstrand for two years or more.

Judicial matters in the Marstrand Free Port were overseen by a set of Magistrates, while order was maintained by the Commandant of Carlsten Fortress, who held the title of Governor-General in the colonial fashion. The Magistrates, tasked with ensuring Swedish law was followed, had no power to decide any measures without the co-operation of the Council of Burghers, and in more important matters, decisions had to be reviewed by Marstrand's inhabitants.

==== Society ====
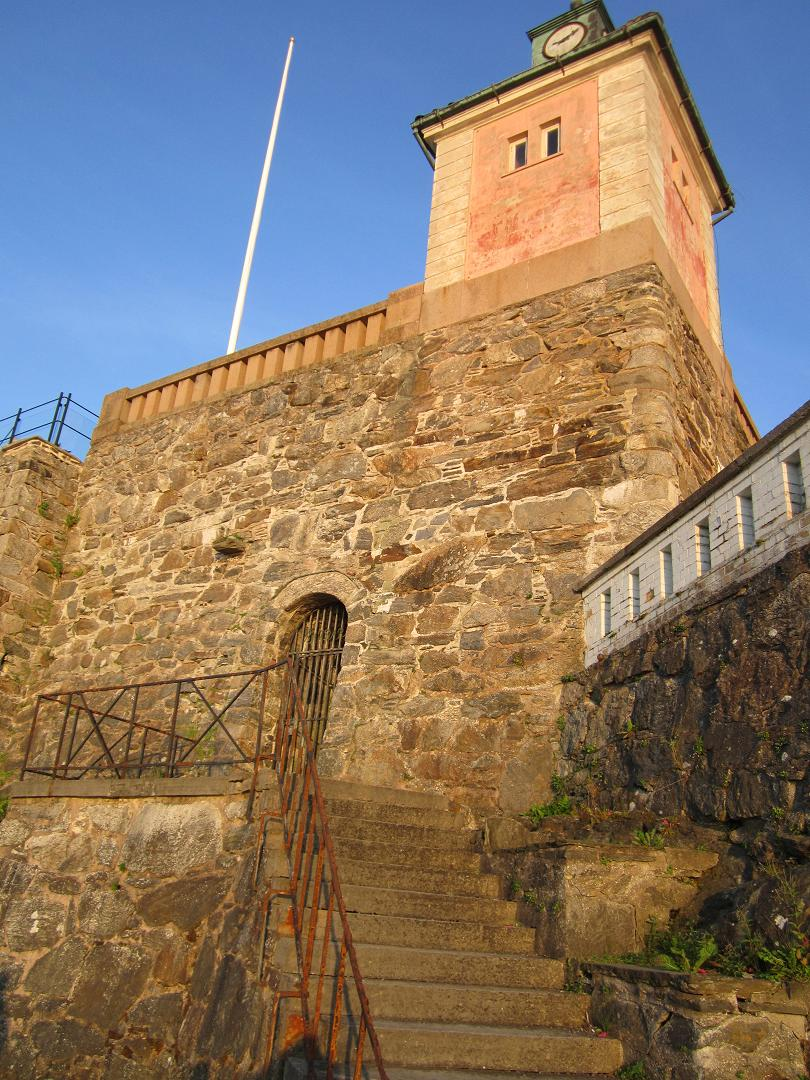
Fort Fredriksborg in Marstrand was the site of one of Sweden's first synagogues

Due to its status as a porto Franco, Marstrand's population boomed, going from around 700 during the 1760s to about 1,700 people in 1788, 50% were immigrants. In addition to this, there was a large migratory population. While most were from the rest of Bohuslän, nearby Gothenburg or the capital Stockholm, every Swedish county was represented, with a significant foreign minority. Immigration from both Sweden and all over Europe was encouraged, to bring in financial capital – if a person brought property in Marstrand, and resided there for two years, they received citizenship. Overall, most people only stayed in Marstrand for a few years, and few brought their families. In the words of an anonymous poet, every language and dialect could be heard in the Free Port.

As part of the charter mandated by Gustav III, complete religious freedom, rare in a non-secular country dominated by the strict Church of Sweden, was given to Marstrand's inhabitant, following discussions between Gustav III and Louis XV. This caused numerous Jews to migrate there, benefiting from the lack of trade restrictions and the ability to freely practice Judaism. Initially these were mainly wealthy merchants, who worked together with the Swedish East India Company. Later, Jewish craftsmen and more lowly traders also came. The first Jewish people in Marstrand were Moses Salomon and Elias Magnus, who settled there in 1779. In the early 1780s numerous Jews came from Hamburg, which prompted the construction of a synagogue – the very first in Sweden. After permission was granted by Gustav III, part of Carlsten Fortress was rented out to the newly formed Jewish congregation for religious purposes. Later on, another building within the town itself was used. As they had no rabbi, the congregation was led by a hazzan (cantor). It consisted of about 60 people living in Marstrand permanently, the temporary population passing over a hundred. Following the end of the Free Port in 1794, almost all Jews in the town moved to Gothenburg, forming the core of the modern congregation there.

Many political refugees also came to Marstrand, especially hailing from the French Revolution, the outbreak of which in 1789 (and subsequent events) caused a large community of expatriate Frenchmen, both exiled aristocrats and dissident republicans, to form abroad. Gustav III, deeply connected to the French royal family and heavily invested in the counter-revolutionary cause, no doubt welcomed them. Many had wealth and brought it with them. Some stayed in Sweden permanently, others lived incognito under assumed names and either returned home again or left for other destinations.

==== Criminals ====
Much due to its free flow of commerce and loose rules, Marstrand became known as a stronghold of sin, especially among the clergy. There was some truth tin that since the Free Port's charter, in Gustav III's own words, stipulated that it was to be a safe haven for all manners of criminals. As long as their crime concerned no matters of "honour and life", they were afforded full legal protection. That caused a surge of debtors and other financial criminals moving into the Free Port who often brought with them their stolen profits. Upon arrival, the "refugees" received official certificates from the Council of Burghers, recording their transgression, and permission to reside on the island. Sometimes, employees of prominent herring trading houses would arrive in Marstrand while they carried a large sum of money intended for use in local investments, promptly signed up for a certificate and freely walked away with the funds.

Many of these arrivals were of upper-class origin, some even noblemen and often gained prominent positions within the society of the Free Port as well. Among them were counts, military officers, royal secretaries, East India Company treasurers, court magistrates, barons, and others. The grand parties hosted by some of these men at local taverns together with the local burghers, the Commandant, and the Carlsten Fortress officers, have been recorded. However, not all who came to Marstrand had such social standing since other recorded cases included unhappy peasants seeking to escape their marriages, apprentices fleeing heavy-handed masters, youths seeking to marry against the wishes of their parents, and individuals wanted for breaking the royal alcohol monopoly by illicitly producing brännvin. It was only in 1792, two years prior to the Free Port's demise, that the rule on people fleeing the legal system entry was changed. Before then, over 500 people had made use of the rule, about 10% of which were foreigners from the other Nordic countries, Germany and England.

Some well-known criminals came there less willingly. Given the penal use of Carlsten Fortress, often for political prisoners, many of those convicted of participation of the 1788 Anjala conspiracy in which military officers plotted to force an end to the Russo-Swedish War (1788–1790), and possibly to create an independent Finland were interned in Marstrand. Some were deported from there to Saint Barthélemy, but others remained on the island. The noble prisoners, numbering many dozens were given large liberties, and were often free to wander around the heavily defended Free Port and socialize and were accompanied by a single guardsman.

=== Decline ===
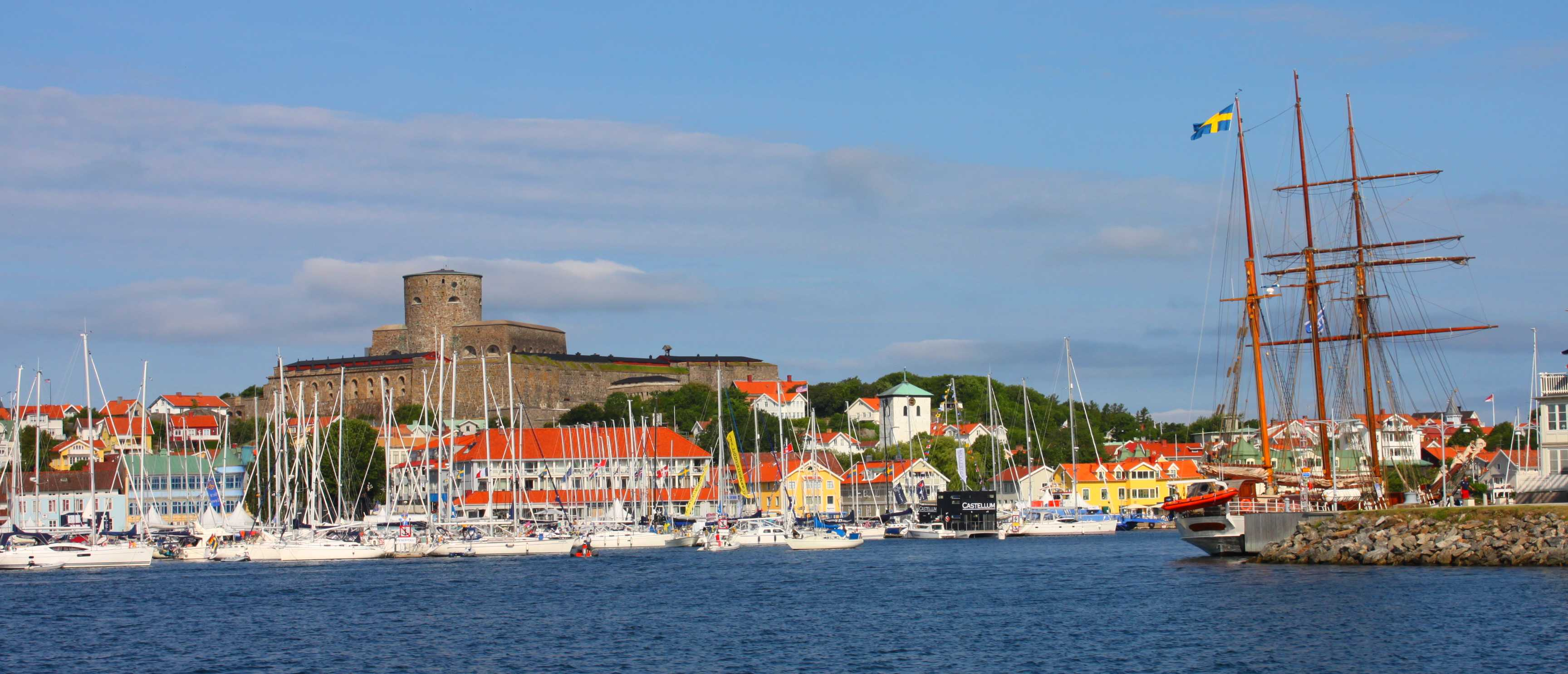
Marstrand and Carlsten Fortress, in the 21st century

Despite said heavy defences, smuggling was rife in the Marstrand Free Port. Preventing it was, however, largely a futile task, with large amounts of goods trafficked from and to the Free Port, and onwards, past the royal tolls. Another problem was piracy, when in 1789 during the Russo-Swedish War a group of privateers from Russia attacked Swedish shipping on the west coast.

During Gustav III's later reign, with the Russo-Swedish War and the Theatre War in which Dano-Norwegian troops came very close to Marstrand, Sweden was fraught with political instability. In 1792, the Free Port's royal creator and benefactor was assassinated by disgruntled noblemen, and the young Gustav IV Adolf was crowned. However, Marstrand prospered, its population steadily rising and commerce reaching new heights. At the same time, fears grew that the Free Port was being misused for personal (and above all, foreign) gain rather than royal (and local) profits, and the fight against smuggling became quite hopeless. In the end, it was the burghers of Marstrand themselves who brought the Free Port era to an end, after almost twenty years in operation. They requested a royal withdrawal of the town's rights as a porto Franco. That was granted on 15 May 1794 through a decree by Gustav IV Adolf's regency government.

Marstrand soon declined. The population had decreased substantially already within a year, the Jewish congregation had left, and much of the international investment ceased. As the herring period continued for about a decade more, Marstrand's primary industry remained, and the burghers still prospered for some time. By 1808 the herring was gone, and the glory days were gone with it. Fifteen years later, much of the wooden town was destroyed in a fire, which marked the final end. Today, Marstrand is largely a tourist town, with a population of about 1,300 people.

== See also ==
- Anders Chydenius
- Gustav III of Sweden's coffee experiment
- History of the Jews in Sweden
- Swedish overseas colonies
