= 1952–53 Division 3 (Swedish football) =

Swedish League Division 3
- Season: 1952–53
- Champions: Lycksele IF; Fagerviks GF; Avesta AIK; IK Sleipner; Redbergslids IK; Landskrona BoIS
- Promoted: 18 teams
- Relegated: 16 teams

Statistics of Swedish football Division 3 for the 1952–53 season.

== League standings ==
=== Norrländska Norra 1952–53 ===
Pos	Team	Pld	W	D	L	GF	GA	GD	Pts	Promotion or relegation
1	Lycksele IF	18	13	3	2	59	13	+46	29	Promoted
2	Skellefteå AIK	18	14	0	4	66	27	+39	28	Promoted
3	IFK Luleå	18	7	4	7	36	30	+6	18	
4	IF Friska Viljor, Örnsköldsvik	18	8	2	8	29	42	−13	18	
5	Bodens BK	18	5	7	6	41	36	+5	17	
6	IFK Holmsund	18	8	1	9	31	37	−6	17	
7	Sandviks IK	18	6	4	8	33	37	−4	16	
8	Luleå SK	18	8	0	10	30	38	−8	16	
9	Rönnskärs IF	18	4	3	11	23	34	−11	11	Relegated
10	IFK Umeå	18	5	0	13	24	78	−54	10	Relegated

=== Norrländska Södra 1952–53 ===
Pos	Team	Pld	W	D	L	GF	GA	GD	Pts	Promotion or relegation
1	Fagerviks GF	18	17	0	1	79	15	+64	34	Promoted
2	Ljunga IF, Ljungaverken	18	11	3	4	45	27	+18	25	Promoted
3	Sollefteå GIF	18	8	3	7	43	41	+2	19	Promoted
4	Arbrå BK	18	7	3	8	43	44	−1	17	
5	Edsbyns IF	18	7	2	9	39	36	+3	16	
6	Kubikenborgs IF	18	6	4	8	36	49	−13	16	
7	Ljusdals IF	18	6	3	9	33	37	−4	15	
8	Kramfors IF	18	6	2	10	31	48	−17	14	
9	Hudiksvalls IF	18	5	3	10	24	37	−13	13	Relegated
10	Wifsta/Östrands IF	18	4	3	11	29	68	−39	11	Relegated

=== Norra 1952–53 ===
Pos	Team	Pld	W	D	L	GF	GA	GD	Pts	Promotion or relegation
1	Avesta AIK	18	11	3	4	55	32	+23	25	Promoted
2	Sandvikens AIK	18	10	3	5	45	32	+13	23	Promoted
3	Falu BS, Falun	18	8	5	5	33	35	−2	21	Promoted
4	IFK Östersund	18	8	3	7	36	25	+11	19	Promoted
5	IF Älgarna, Härnösand	18	8	3	7	41	37	+4	19	Promoted
6	Ljusne AIK	18	8	2	8	41	42	−1	18	Promoted
7	GIF Sundsvall	18	6	4	8	31	34	−3	16	Promoted
8	Gefle IF, Gävle	18	6	4	8	41	48	−7	16	Relegated
9	Ludvika FFI	18	5	5	8	36	42	−6	15	Relegated
10	Spånga IS	18	3	2	13	26	58	−32	8	Relegated

=== Östra 1952–53 ===
Pos	Team	Pld	W	D	L	GF	GA	GD	Pts	Promotion or relegation
1	IK Sleipner, Norrköping	18	13	0	5	58	35	+23	26	Promoted
2	Västerås IK	18	11	2	5	39	45	−6	24	Promoted
3	IFK Eskilstuna	18	8	7	3	47	31	+16	23	Promoted
4	Husqvarna IF	18	10	3	5	41	33	+8	23	
5	Köpings IS	18	8	4	6	56	35	+21	20	
6	Huskvarna Södra IS	18	8	1	9	38	37	+1	17	
7	Hällefors AIF	18	6	5	7	40	45	−5	17	
8	BK Kenty, Linköping	18	6	3	9	44	47	−3	15	Relegated
9	Surahammars IF	18	5	1	12	25	41	−16	11	Relegated
10	BK Hird, Norrköping	18	1	2	15	16	55	−39	4	Relegated

=== Västra 1952–53 ===
Pos	Team	Pld	W	D	L	GF	GA	GD	Pts	Promotion or relegation
1	Redbergslids IK, Göteborg	18	11	3	4	47	25	+22	25	Promoted
2	Karlskoga IF	18	10	4	4	44	21	+23	24	Promoted
3	Tidaholms GIF	18	9	3	6	41	30	+11	21	
4	Sävedalens IF	18	9	2	7	36	37	−1	20	
5	IFK Bofors	18	7	4	7	38	35	+3	18	
6	Trollhättans IF	18	8	2	8	38	36	+2	18	
7	IK Viking, Hagfors	18	7	4	7	26	39	−13	18	
8	Skara IF	18	6	3	9	37	48	−11	15	Relegated
9	Vänersborgs IF	18	4	5	9	34	42	−8	13	Relegated
10	IFK Trollhättan	18	2	4	12	23	51	−28	8	Relegated

=== Södra 1952–53 ===
Pos	Team	Pld	W	D	L	GF	GA	GD	Pts	Promotion or relegation
1	Landskrona BoIS	18	12	2	4	55	17	+38	26	Promoted
2	Nybro IF	18	10	3	5	44	35	+9	23	
3	Waggeryds IK	18	10	2	6	60	33	+27	22	
4	IFK Oskarshamn	18	7	6	5	34	38	−4	20	
5	Östers IF, Växjö	18	7	4	7	30	32	−2	18	
6	Falkenbergs FF	18	6	5	7	25	34	−9	17	
7	Trelleborgs FF	18	4	8	6	39	46	−7	16	
8	IFK Värnamo	18	5	4	9	28	41	−13	14	Relegated
9	Ronneby BK	18	4	6	8	26	50	−24	14	Relegated
10	Kalmar AIK	18	2	6	10	31	46	−15	10	Relegated
