= 1953–54 Division 3 (Swedish football) =

Swedish League Division 3
- Season: 1953–54
- Champions: IFK Holmsund; IF Friska Viljor; Skutskärs IF; Köpings IS; Södertälje SK; Karlstads BIK; Nybro IF; Kinna IF; IS Halmia
- Promoted: 9 teams above
- Relegated: 25 teams

Statistics of Swedish football Division 3 for the 1953–54 season.

== League standings ==
=== Norra Norrland 1953–54 ===
Pos	Team	Pld	W	D	L	GF	GA	GD	Pts	Promotion or relegation
1	IFK Holmsund	18	12	3	3	46	19	+27	27	Promoted
2	IFK Luleå	18	10	5	3	38	21	+17	25	
3	Bodens BK	18	10	4	4	55	27	+28	24	
4	Luleå SK	18	9	4	5	48	30	+18	22	
5	Sandviks IK	18	7	4	7	54	31	+23	18	
6	IFK Kiruna	18	6	6	6	31	33	−2	18	
7	IFK Kalix	18	6	3	9	36	44	−8	15	
8	Rosviks IK	18	6	3	9	38	56	−18	15	
9	Hörnefors IF	18	4	1	13	17	68	−51	9	Relegated
10	Clemensnäs IF	18	3	1	14	15	49	−34	7	Relegated

=== Mellersta Norrland 1953–54 ===
Pos	Team	Pld	W	D	L	GF	GA	GD	Pts	Promotion or relegation
1	IF Friska Viljor, Örnsköldsvik	18	13	1	4	51	26	+25	27	Promoted
2	Kramfors IF	18	10	4	4	55	26	+29	24	
3	Husums IF	18	11	0	7	37	23	+14	22	
4	Köpmanholmens IF	18	9	0	9	47	42	+5	18	
5	Bollsta IK	18	8	2	8	35	43	−8	18	
6	Svanö SK	18	8	2	8	36	51	−15	18	
7	Ope IF	18	7	2	9	39	41	−2	16	
8	Alfredshems IK	18	7	1	10	34	38	−4	15	
9	Wäija-Dynäs IK	18	6	3	9	28	43	−15	15	Relegated
10	Frånö SK	18	3	1	14	28	57	−29	7	Relegated

=== Södra Norrland 1953–54 ===
Pos	Team	Pld	W	D	L	GF	GA	GD	Pts	Promotion or relegation
1	Skutskärs IF	18	13	3	2	58	25	+33	29	Promoted
2	Ljusdals IF	18	10	2	6	46	30	+16	22	
3	Hofors AIF	18	7	8	3	39	28	+11	22	
4	Marma IF	18	9	3	6	33	31	+2	21	
5	Edsbyns IF	18	9	2	7	58	47	+11	20	
6	Kubikenborgs IF	18	6	7	5	41	37	+4	19	
7	Arbrå BK	18	7	4	7	54	45	+9	18	
8	Delsbo IF	18	6	3	9	37	44	−7	15	Relegated
9	Iggesunds IK	18	3	3	12	31	67	−36	9	Relegated
10	Matfors IF	18	1	3	14	29	72	−43	5	Relegated

=== Norra Svealand 1953–54 ===
Pos	Team	Pld	W	D	L	GF	GA	GD	Pts	Promotion or relegation
1	Köpings IS	18	14	1	3	54	24	+30	29	Promoted
2	Hallstahammars SK	18	11	3	4	51	28	+23	25	
3	IFK Grängesberg	18	8	5	5	38	30	+8	21	
4	IF Vesta, Uppsala	19	9	3	7	42	36	+6	21	
5	BK Vargarna, Norrtälje	18	9	1	8	32	38	−6	19	
6	Säters IF	18	7	4	7	40	39	+1	18	
7	Leksands IF	18	7	3	8	46	43	+3	17	
8	Enköpings SK	18	7	2	9	28	43	−15	16	Relegated
9	Edsbro IF	18	6	3	9	39	48	−9	15	Relegated
10	Fagersta AIK	18	0	1	17	29	70	−41	1	Relegated

=== Östra Svealand 1953–54 ===
Pos	Team	Pld	W	D	L	GF	GA	GD	Pts	Promotion or relegation
1	Södertälje SK	18	13	1	4	47	21	+26	27	Promoted
2	Katrineholms AIK	18	11	2	5	43	29	+14	24	
3	Gröndals IK	18	8	5	5	37	25	+12	21	
4	IFK Stockholm	18	8	4	6	45	31	+14	20	
5	Älvsjö AIK	18	9	2	7	34	30	+4	20	
6	Vasalunds IF, Solna	18	6	5	7	40	28	+12	17	
7	IK Sture, Stockholm	18	6	5	7	28	36	−8	17	
8	Reymersholms IK, Stockholm	18	5	6	7	32	42	−10	16	Relegated
9	Östermalms IS, Eskilstuna	18	3	5	10	22	43	−21	11	Relegated
10	Nyköpings AIK	18	2	3	13	26	64	−38	7	Relegated

=== Västra Svealand 1953–54 ===
Pos	Team	Pld	W	D	L	GF	GA	GD	Pts	Promotion or relegation
1	Karlstads BIK	18	11	3	4	38	24	+14	25	Promoted
2	Billingsfors IK	18	8	6	4	37	29	+8	22	
3	IF Viken, Åmål	18	9	3	6	40	24	+16	21	
4	Hällefors AIF	18	8	5	5	46	32	+14	21	
5	IFK Bofors	18	7	3	8	29	30	−1	17	
6	IFK Kumla	18	6	5	7	27	29	−2	17	
7	Karlsunds IF, Örebro	18	5	5	8	34	36	−2	15	
8	IFK Åmål	18	3	9	6	25	36	−11	15	Relegated
9	IFK Munkfors	18	6	3	9	29	48	−19	15	Relegated
10	IK Viking, Hagfors	18	4	4	10	24	41	−17	12	Relegated

=== Östra Götaland 1953–54 ===
Pos	Team	Pld	W	D	L	GF	GA	GD	Pts	Promotion or relegation
1	Nybro IF	18	14	3	1	52	22	+30	31	Promoted
2	Waggeryds IK	18	12	2	4	52	31	+21	26	
3	IFK Oskarshamn	18	11	1	6	44	25	+19	23	
4	Olofströms IF	18	11	0	7	57	45	+12	22	
5	Husqvarna IF	18	8	2	8	33	41	−8	18	
6	Finspångs AIK	18	7	2	9	38	37	+1	16	
7	Hultsfreds AIK	18	5	4	9	40	48	−8	14	
8	Huskvarna Södra IS	18	6	2	10	38	46	−8	14	Relegated
9	Boxholms IF	18	2	5	11	24	46	−22	9	Relegated
10	Högadals IS	18	3	1	14	31	68	−37	7	Relegated

=== Västra Götaland 1953–54 ===
Pos	Team	Pld	W	D	L	GF	GA	GD	Pts	Promotion or relegation
1	Kinna IF	18	15	1	2	38	20	+18	31	Promoted
2	Tidaholms GIF	18	9	6	3	37	24	+13	24	
3	IK Oddevold, Uddevalla	18	8	5	5	34	31	+3	21	
4	Trollhättans IF	18	9	2	7	30	29	+1	20	
5	Sävedalens IF	18	7	5	6	40	31	+9	19	
6	Göteborgs FF	18	5	7	6	32	38	−6	17	
7	Sjuntorps IF	18	5	6	7	22	24	−2	16	
8	Fässbergs IF, Mölndal	18	6	3	9	23	27	−4	15	Relegated
9	IK Virgo, Göteborg	18	3	4	11	21	30	−9	10	Relegated
10	Fritsla IF	18	2	3	13	21	44	−23	7	Relegated

=== Södra Götaland 1953–54 ===
Pos	Team	Pld	W	D	L	GF	GA	GD	Pts	Promotion or relegation
1	IS Halmia, Halmstad	18	12	5	1	55	19	+36	29	Promoted
2	Trelleborgs FF	18	9	4	5	44	34	+10	22	
3	IFK Kristianstad	18	10	2	6	36	30	+6	22	
4	Lunds BK	18	8	5	5	33	29	+4	21	
5	Falkenbergs FF	18	7	6	5	38	39	−1	20	
6	Östers IF, Växjö	18	7	3	8	35	37	−2	17	
7	BK Landora, Landskrona	18	8	0	10	36	32	+4	16	
8	BK Drott, Hälsingborg	18	4	5	9	30	49	−19	13	Relegated
9	Gunnarstorps IF	18	5	2	11	34	47	−13	12	Relegated
10	Arlövs BIF	18	3	2	13	22	47	−25	8	Relegated
