= 1954–55 Division 3 (Swedish football) =

Swedish League Division 3
- Season: 1954–55
- Champions: Bodens BK; Sollefteå GIF; GIF Sundsvall; Surahammars IF; IFK Stockholm; SK Sifhälla; Husqvarna IF; Örgryte IS; Trelleborgs FF
- Promoted: 9 teams above
- Relegated: 15 teams

Statistics of Swedish football Division 3 for the 1954–55 season.

== League standings ==
=== Norra Norrland 1954–55 ===
Pos	Team	Pld	W	D	L	GF	GA	GD	Pts	Promotion or relegation
1	Bodens BK	18	14	2	2	74	30	+44	30	Promoted
2	Luleå SK	18	10	5	3	44	22	+22	25	
3	Skellefteå IF	18	9	3	6	41	36	+5	21	
4	Sunnanå SK	18	8	4	6	42	31	+11	20	
5	Sandviks IK	18	8	2	8	45	34	+11	18	
6	IFK Luleå	18	8	2	8	43	35	+8	18	
7	Rosviks IK	18	6	3	9	35	50	−15	15	
8	Piteå IF	18	5	1	12	32	53	−21	11	
9	IFK Kalix	18	4	3	11	29	51	−22	11	
10	IFK Kiruna	18	4	3	11	18	61	−43	11	Relegated

=== Mellersta Norrland 1954–55 ===
Pos	Team	Pld	W	D	L	GF	GA	GD	Pts	Promotion or relegation
1	Sollefteå GIF	18	14	0	4	63	27	+36	28	Promoted
2	Domsjö IF	18	11	3	4	50	40	+10	25	
3	Husums IF	18	10	4	4	46	29	+17	24	
4	Bollsta IK	18	9	3	6	57	42	+15	21	
5	Köpmanholmens IF	18	8	4	6	51	34	+17	20	
6	Alfredshems IK	18	8	4	6	36	42	−6	20	
7	Kramfors IF	18	8	3	7	48	40	+8	19	
8	Ope IF	18	6	1	11	36	37	−1	13	
9	Svanö SK	18	2	1	15	26	71	−45	5	Relegated
10	Hammerdals IF	18	1	3	14	38	89	−51	5	Relegated

=== Södra Norrland 1954–55 ===
Pos	Team	Pld	W	D	L	GF	GA	GD	Pts	Promotion or relegation
1	GIF Sundsvall	20	16	1	3	67	28	+39	33	Promoted
2	Marma IF	20	11	6	3	46	22	+24	28	
3	Gefle IF, Gävle	20	11	4	5	63	36	+27	26	
4	Hofors AIF	20	11	4	5	45	35	+10	26	
5	Ljusdals IF	20	11	2	7	44	36	+8	24	
6	Kubikenborgs IF	20	10	1	9	39	53	−14	21	
7	Söderhamns IF	20	6	6	8	34	38	−4	18	
8	Wifsta/Östrands IF	20	7	2	11	39	49	−10	16	
9	Edsbyns IF	20	6	2	12	40	52	−12	14	Relegated
10	Arbrå BK	20	1	5	14	23	54	−31	7	Relegated
11	Ljunga IF, Ljungaverken	20	3	1	16	24	61	−37	7	Relegated

=== Norra Svealand 1954–55 ===
Pos	Team	Pld	W	D	L	GF	GA	GD	Pts	Promotion or relegation
1	Surahammars IF	22	14	4	4	69	37	+32	32	Promoted
2	Avesta AIK	22	12	3	7	47	36	+11	27	
3	IF Vesta, Uppsala	22	11	4	7	48	30	+18	26	
4	Västerås IK	22	11	4	7	55	41	+14	26	
5	Rimbo IF	22	10	5	7	51	55	−4	25	
6	Islingby IK	22	8	4	10	37	50	−13	20	
7	Leksands IF	22	7	5	10	47	48	−1	19	
8	Hallstahammars SK	22	7	5	10	50	54	−4	19	
9	IFK Grängesberg	22	8	3	11	45	54	−9	19	
10	Falu BS, Falun	22	5	9	8	32	41	−9	19	Relegated
11	Säters IF	22	8	3	11	41	54	−13	19	Relegated
12	BK Vargarna, Norrtälje	22	5	3	14	40	62	−22	13	Relegated

=== Östra Svealand 1954–55 ===
Pos	Team	Pld	W	D	L	GF	GA	GD	Pts	Promotion or relegation
1	IFK Stockholm	18	12	3	3	54	21	+33	27	Promoted
2	Vasalunds IF, Solna	18	10	4	4	50	27	+23	24	
3	Katrineholms AIK	18	9	3	6	44	36	+8	21	
4	Hagalunds IS, Solna	18	8	5	5	35	33	+2	21	
5	IK Sture, Stockholm	18	7	4	7	31	27	+4	18	
6	Gröndals IK	18	6	6	6	37	34	+3	18	
7	Katrineholms SK	18	6	5	7	42	37	+5	17	
8	Hälleforsnäs IF	18	7	0	11	34	54	−20	14	Relegated
9	Älvsjö AIK	18	5	3	10	37	53	−16	13	Relegated
10	Värtans IK, Stockholm	18	2	3	13	21	63	−42	7	Relegated

=== Västra Svealand 1954–55 ===
Pos	Team	Pld	W	D	L	GF	GA	GD	Pts	Promotion or relegation
1	SK Sifhälla, Säffle	18	11	4	3	42	25	+17	26	Promoted
2	IF Viken, Åmål	18	10	5	3	45	24	+21	25	
3	Billingsfors IK	18	9	4	5	40	28	+12	22	
4	IFK Kumla	18	6	7	5	34	26	+8	19	
5	IFK Kristinehamn	18	8	3	7	36	36	0	19	
6	IFK Bofors	18	7	3	8	34	33	+1	17	
7	Karlslunds IF, Örebro	18	6	4	8	28	35	−7	16	
8	Arvika BK	18	6	3	9	32	37	−5	15	
9	Laxå IF	18	5	1	12	25	51	−26	11	
10	Hällefors IF	18	3	4	11	29	50	−21	10	Relegated

=== Östra Götaland 1954–55 ===
Pos	Team	Pld	W	D	L	GF	GA	GD	Pts	Promotion or relegation
1	Husqvarna IF	18	13	3	2	47	22	+25	29	Promoted
2	Waggeryds IK	18	11	3	4	57	30	+27	25	Promoted
3	Kalmar AIK	18	10	4	4	51	30	+21	24	
4	BK Kenty, Linköping	18	7	6	5	41	33	+8	20	
5	Oskarshamns AIK	18	7	5	6	46	41	+5	19	
6	IFK Oskarshamn	18	8	2	8	40	39	+1	18	
7	Finspångs AIK	18	7	3	8	39	34	+5	17	
8	Åby IF	18	4	6	8	35	48	−13	14	
9	Norrhults BK	18	5	2	11	34	58	−24	12	
10	Hultsfreds AIK	18	0	2	16	16	71	−55	2	Relegated

=== Västra Götaland 1954–55 ===
Pos	Team	Pld	W	D	L	GF	GA	GD	Pts	Promotion or relegation
1	Örgryte IS, Göteborg	22	14	8	0	86	27	+59	36	Promoted
2	BK Häcken, Göteborg	22	14	5	3	55	24	+31	33	Promoted
3	IK Oddevold, Uddevalla	22	13	5	4	61	35	+26	31	
4	Sävedalens IF	22	9	7	6	42	37	+5	25	
5	IFK Trollhättan	22	10	3	9	48	47	+1	23	
6	Tidaholms GIF	22	10	3	9	49	50	−1	23	
7	Göteborgs FF	22	8	5	9	50	52	−2	21	
8	Trollhättans IF	22	7	3	12	38	47	−9	17	
9	IFK Falköping	22	7	3	12	41	57	−16	17	
10	Redbergslids IK, Göteborg	22	5	4	13	37	62	−25	14	
11	Skogens IF, Göteborg	22	5	3	14	23	63	−40	13	
12	Sjuntorps IF	22	3	5	14	26	55	−29	11	Relegated

=== Södra Götaland 1954–55 ===
Pos	Team	Pld	W	D	L	GF	GA	GD	Pts	Promotion
1	Trelleborgs FF	18	12	3	3	43	25	+18	27	Promoted
2	IFK Kristianstad	18	10	5	3	47	30	+17	25	
3	Falkenbergs FF	18	8	5	5	36	31	+5	21	
4	Lunds BK	18	7	5	6	26	19	+7	19	
5	Olofströms IF	18	7	5	6	40	35	+5	19	
6	Malmö BI	18	5	7	6	33	32	+1	17	
7	Eskilsminne IF, Hälsingborg	18	5	5	8	32	43	−11	15	
8	IFK Värnamo	18	5	4	9	30	38	−8	14	
9	Östers IF, Växjö	18	5	3	10	19	31	−12	13	
10	BK Landora, Landskrona	18	5	0	13	21	43	−22	10	
