= 1934–35 Division 3 (Swedish football) =

Swedish League Division 3
- Season: 1934–35
- Champions: Skärgårdens IF; Fagersta AIK; Värtans IK; IFK Örebro; IFK Kristinehamn; Skärblacka IF; Lessebo GIF; Alingsås IF; Oskarströms IS; IFK Kristianstad
- Promoted: 8 teams
- Relegated: 20 teams

Statistics of Swedish football Division 3 for the 1934–35 season.

== League standings ==
=== Uppsvenska Östra 1934–35 ===
| Pos | Team | Pld | W | D | L | GF | GA | GD | Pts | Qualification or relegation |
|---|---|---|---|---|---|---|---|---|---|---|
| 1 | Skärgårdens IF, Sandarne | 14 | 11 | 2 | 1 | 41 | 11 | +30 | 24 | Promotion Playoffs |
| 2 | Strands IF, Hudiksvall | 14 | 9 | 3 | 2 | 33 | 13 | +20 | 21 | |
| 3 | Söderhamns IF | 14 | 4 | 6 | 4 | 18 | 16 | +2 | 14 | |
| 4 | Brynäs IF, Gävle | 14 | 5 | 4 | 5 | 24 | 37 | −13 | 14 | |
| 5 | Ala IF | 14 | 4 | 4 | 6 | 21 | 27 | −6 | 12 | |
| 6 | Skutskärs IF | 14 | 3 | 5 | 6 | 25 | 22 | +3 | 11 | |
| 7 | Iggesunds IK | 14 | 4 | 1 | 9 | 20 | 28 | −8 | 9 | Relegated |
| 8 | Älvkarleby IK | 14 | 1 | 5 | 8 | 10 | 38 | −28 | 7 | Relegated |

=== Uppsvenska Västra 1934–35 ===
| Pos | Team | Pld | W | D | L | GF | GA | GD | Pts | Promotion or relegation |
|---|---|---|---|---|---|---|---|---|---|---|
| 1 | Fagersta AIK | 14 | 11 | 1 | 2 | 37 | 16 | +21 | 23 | Promotion Playoffs – Promoted |
| 2 | Hofors AIF | 14 | 8 | 3 | 3 | 24 | 17 | +7 | 19 | |
| 3 | Avesta AIK | 14 | 6 | 4 | 4 | 26 | 23 | +3 | 16 | |
| 4 | Holmens IF | 14 | 6 | 2 | 6 | 33 | 31 | +2 | 14 | |
| 5 | Sandvikens AIK | 14 | 5 | 2 | 7 | 27 | 22 | +5 | 12 | |
| 6 | Falu BK, Falun | 14 | 5 | 2 | 7 | 25 | 31 | −6 | 12 | |
| 7 | IFK Hedemora | 14 | 4 | 4 | 6 | 19 | 27 | −8 | 12 | Relegated |
| 8 | Valbo IF | 14 | 1 | 2 | 11 | 12 | 36 | −24 | 4 | Relegated |

=== Östsvenska 1934–35 ===
| Pos | Team | Pld | W | D | L | GF | GA | GD | Pts | Promotion or relegation |
|---|---|---|---|---|---|---|---|---|---|---|
| 1 | Värtans IK, Stockholm | 18 | 12 | 5 | 1 | 58 | 21 | +37 | 29 | Promoted |
| 2 | Reymersholms IK, Stockholm | 18 | 12 | 3 | 3 | 57 | 27 | +30 | 27 | |
| 3 | IK Sture, Stockholm | 18 | 9 | 1 | 8 | 41 | 31 | +10 | 19 | |
| 4 | IF Vesta, Uppsala | 18 | 8 | 3 | 7 | 38 | 34 | +4 | 19 | |
| 5 | Enköpings SK | 18 | 8 | 3 | 7 | 31 | 31 | 0 | 19 | |
| 6 | Nyköpings BK | 18 | 5 | 7 | 6 | 30 | 31 | −1 | 17 | |
| 7 | Westermalms IF, Stockholm | 18 | 5 | 7 | 6 | 28 | 40 | −12 | 17 | |
| 8 | Enskede IK | 18 | 7 | 2 | 9 | 32 | 34 | −2 | 16 | |
| 9 | Södertälje SK | 18 | 3 | 5 | 10 | 30 | 53 | −23 | 11 | Relegated |
| 10 | Uppsala IF | 18 | 2 | 2 | 14 | 16 | 59 | −43 | 6 | Relegated |

=== Mellansvenska 1934–35 ===
| Pos | Team | Pld | W | D | L | GF | GA | GD | Pts | Promotion or relegation |
|---|---|---|---|---|---|---|---|---|---|---|
| 1 | IFK Örebro | 18 | 9 | 7 | 2 | 50 | 22 | +28 | 25 | Promoted |
| 2 | Katrineholms AIK | 18 | 10 | 4 | 4 | 43 | 21 | +22 | 24 | |
| 3 | Örebro IK | 18 | 10 | 4 | 4 | 53 | 31 | +22 | 24 | |
| 4 | IFK Lindesberg | 18 | 9 | 4 | 5 | 54 | 34 | +20 | 22 | |
| 5 | IK City, Eskilstuna | 18 | 10 | 2 | 6 | 41 | 31 | +10 | 22 | |
| 6 | IFK Arboga | 18 | 10 | 2 | 6 | 43 | 34 | +9 | 22 | |
| 7 | Katrineholms SK | 18 | 7 | 5 | 6 | 30 | 24 | +6 | 19 | |
| 8 | Västerås SK | 18 | 1 | 7 | 10 | 20 | 44 | −24 | 9 | |
| 9 | IK Westmannia, Köping | 18 | 3 | 2 | 13 | 21 | 57 | −36 | 8 | Relegated |
| 10 | Yxhults IK | 18 | 2 | 1 | 15 | 16 | 73 | −57 | 5 | Relegated |

=== Nordvästra 1934–35 ===
| Pos | Team | Pld | W | D | L | GF | GA | GD | Pts | Promotion or relegation |
|---|---|---|---|---|---|---|---|---|---|---|
| 1 | IFK Kristinehamn | 18 | 11 | 5 | 2 | 44 | 20 | +24 | 27 | Promoted |
| 2 | Jannelunds SK | 18 | 9 | 5 | 4 | 49 | 29 | +20 | 23 | |
| 3 | Deje IK | 18 | 9 | 5 | 4 | 45 | 29 | +16 | 23 | |
| 4 | Arvika BK | 18 | 9 | 2 | 7 | 33 | 33 | 0 | 20 | |
| 5 | IFK Åmål | 18 | 7 | 4 | 7 | 32 | 33 | −1 | 18 | |
| 6 | Karlstads BK | 18 | 8 | 1 | 9 | 37 | 34 | +3 | 17 | |
| 7 | Melleruds IF | 18 | 7 | 3 | 8 | 28 | 33 | −5 | 17 | |
| 8 | Mariehofs IF, Karlstad | 18 | 6 | 4 | 8 | 27 | 37 | −10 | 16 | |
| 9 | IK Svenske, Örebro | 18 | 6 | 3 | 9 | 30 | 40 | −10 | 15 | Relegated |
| 10 | Grums IK | 18 | 1 | 2 | 15 | 20 | 57 | −37 | 4 | Relegated |

=== Södra Mellansvenska 1934–35 ===
| Pos | Team | Pld | W | D | L | GF | GA | GD | Pts | Promotion or relegation |
|---|---|---|---|---|---|---|---|---|---|---|
| 1 | Skärblacka IF | 18 | 14 | 3 | 1 | 62 | 21 | +41 | 31 | Promoted |
| 2 | Finspångs IK | 18 | 9 | 5 | 4 | 46 | 30 | +16 | 23 | |
| 3 | IK Tord, Jönköping | 18 | 9 | 2 | 7 | 48 | 37 | +11 | 20 | |
| 4 | Waggeryds IK | 18 | 9 | 2 | 7 | 39 | 34 | +5 | 20 | |
| 5 | Jönköping Södra IF | 18 | 8 | 2 | 8 | 35 | 31 | +4 | 18 | |
| 6 | Motala AIF | 18 | 7 | 3 | 8 | 38 | 52 | −14 | 17 | |
| 7 | IFK Oskarshamn | 18 | 7 | 2 | 9 | 41 | 36 | +5 | 16 | |
| 8 | IF Sylvia, Norrköping | 18 | 6 | 3 | 9 | 37 | 42 | −5 | 15 | |
| 9 | Boxholms IF | 18 | 4 | 2 | 12 | 43 | 77 | −34 | 10 | Relegated |
| 10 | Motala FF | 18 | 4 | 2 | 12 | 26 | 55 | −29 | 10 | Relegated |

=== Sydöstra 1934–35 ===
| Pos | Team | Pld | W | D | L | GF | GA | GD | Pts | Promotion or relegation |
|---|---|---|---|---|---|---|---|---|---|---|
| 1 | Lessebo GIF | 18 | 11 | 5 | 2 | 41 | 24 | +17 | 27 | Promoted |
| 2 | Växjö BK | 18 | 12 | 1 | 5 | 48 | 27 | +21 | 25 | |
| 3 | Kalmar AIK | 18 | 10 | 2 | 6 | 43 | 36 | +7 | 22 | |
| 4 | IFK Karlshamn | 18 | 8 | 5 | 5 | 36 | 31 | +5 | 21 | |
| 5 | Alvesta GIF | 18 | 9 | 2 | 7 | 43 | 40 | +3 | 20 | |
| 6 | Nybro IF | 18 | 8 | 3 | 7 | 42 | 38 | +4 | 19 | |
| 7 | Hovmanstorps GIF | 18 | 6 | 3 | 9 | 31 | 35 | −4 | 15 | |
| 8 | IFK Karlskrona | 18 | 5 | 3 | 10 | 30 | 37 | −7 | 13 | |
| 9 | Växjö FF | 18 | 6 | 0 | 12 | 46 | 53 | −7 | 12 | Relegated |
| 10 | Högadals IS | 18 | 2 | 2 | 14 | 33 | 72 | −39 | 6 | Relegated |

=== Västsvenska Norra 1934–35 ===
| Pos | Team | Pld | W | D | L | GF | GA | GD | Pts | Promotion or relegation |
|---|---|---|---|---|---|---|---|---|---|---|
| 1 | Alingsås IF | 18 | 9 | 6 | 3 | 43 | 21 | +22 | 24 | Promotion Playoffs – Promoted |
| 2 | Skara IF | 18 | 10 | 4 | 4 | 46 | 29 | +17 | 24 | |
| 3 | Surte IS | 18 | 7 | 6 | 5 | 40 | 32 | +8 | 20 | |
| 4 | Fritsla IF | 18 | 9 | 1 | 8 | 48 | 38 | +10 | 19 | |
| 5 | Tidaholms GIF | 18 | 6 | 7 | 5 | 38 | 35 | +3 | 19 | |
| 6 | Kinna IF | 18 | 8 | 2 | 8 | 40 | 39 | +1 | 18 | |
| 7 | Munkedals IF | 18 | 6 | 5 | 7 | 35 | 39 | −4 | 17 | |
| 8 | Trollhättans IF | 18 | 7 | 3 | 8 | 20 | 35 | −15 | 17 | |
| 9 | Uddevalla IS | 18 | 5 | 6 | 7 | 23 | 38 | −15 | 16 | Relegated |
| 10 | IFK Lysekil | 18 | 1 | 4 | 13 | 21 | 48 | −27 | 6 | Relegated |

=== Västsvenska Södra 1934–35 ===
| Pos | Team | Pld | W | D | L | GF | GA | GD | Pts | Qualification or relegation |
|---|---|---|---|---|---|---|---|---|---|---|
| 1 | Oskarströms IS | 18 | 13 | 3 | 2 | 65 | 23 | +42 | 29 | Promotion Playoffs |
| 2 | Lundby IF, Göteborg | 18 | 10 | 4 | 4 | 53 | 36 | +17 | 24 | |
| 3 | Varbergs BoIS | 18 | 9 | 4 | 5 | 47 | 35 | +12 | 22 | |
| 4 | Falkenbergs FF | 18 | 7 | 6 | 5 | 36 | 32 | +4 | 20 | |
| 5 | Skogens IF, Göteborg | 18 | 7 | 4 | 7 | 52 | 49 | +3 | 18 | |
| 6 | Mölnlycke IF | 18 | 6 | 6 | 6 | 49 | 52 | −3 | 18 | |
| 7 | Krokslätts FF, Mölndal | 18 | 7 | 2 | 9 | 42 | 36 | +6 | 16 | |
| 8 | IFK Mölndal | 18 | 6 | 4 | 8 | 22 | 48 | −26 | 16 | |
| 9 | Varbergs GIF | 18 | 5 | 4 | 9 | 36 | 50 | −14 | 14 | Relegated |
| 10 | Majornas IK, Göteborg | 18 | 0 | 3 | 15 | 21 | 62 | −41 | 3 | Relegated |

=== Sydsvenska 1934–35 ===
| Pos | Team | Pld | W | D | L | GF | GA | GD | Pts | Promotion or relegation |
|---|---|---|---|---|---|---|---|---|---|---|
| 1 | IFK Kristianstad | 18 | 14 | 0 | 4 | 50 | 27 | +23 | 28 | Promoted |
| 2 | BK Landora, Landskrona | 18 | 11 | 3 | 4 | 44 | 28 | +16 | 25 | |
| 3 | Trelleborgs BK | 18 | 8 | 3 | 7 | 46 | 26 | +20 | 19 | |
| 4 | Bromölla IF | 18 | 8 | 2 | 8 | 29 | 29 | 0 | 18 | |
| 5 | IFK Trelleborg | 18 | 7 | 3 | 8 | 32 | 27 | +5 | 17 | |
| 6 | Klippans BoIF | 18 | 7 | 3 | 8 | 35 | 34 | +1 | 17 | |
| 7 | BK Drott, Hälsingborg | 18 | 7 | 2 | 9 | 31 | 45 | −14 | 16 | |
| 8 | Lunds GIF | 18 | 8 | 0 | 10 | 36 | 54 | −18 | 16 | |
| 9 | Eskilsminne IF, Hälsingborg | 18 | 6 | 2 | 10 | 28 | 39 | −11 | 14 | Relegated |
| 10 | Hälsans BK, Hälsingborg | 18 | 3 | 4 | 11 | 20 | 42 | −22 | 10 | Relegated |
