= 1948–49 Division 3 (Swedish football) =

Swedish League Division 3
- Season: 1948–49
- Champions: IK Brage; IK City; IF Viken; Huskvarna Södra IS
- Promoted: 4 teams above
- Relegated: 12 teams

Statistics of Swedish football Division 3 for the 1948–49 season.

== League standings ==
=== Norra 1948–49 ===
Pos	Team	Pld	W	D	L	GF	GA	GD	Pts	Promotion or relegation
1	IK Brage, Borlänge	18	11	5	2	44	14	+30	27	Promoted
2	Falu BS, Falun	18	9	5	4	45	26	+19	23	
3	Hofors AIF	18	10	2	6	43	20	+23	22	
4	Brynäs IF, Gävle	18	10	2	6	36	37	−1	22	
5	Fagerviks GIF	18	10	1	7	37	35	+2	21	
6	Västerås IK	18	7	4	7	27	29	−2	18	
7	Västerås SK	18	6	5	7	30	36	−6	17	
8	Avesta AIK	18	8	0	10	36	37	−1	16	Relegated
9	IFK Västerås	18	4	0	14	15	49	−34	8	Relegated
10	Ljusne AIK	18	1	4	13	19	49	−30	6	Relegated

=== Östra 1948–49 ===
Pos	Team	Pld	W	D	L	GF	GA	GD	Pts	Promotion or relegation
1	IK City, Eskilstuna	18	14	3	1	71	27	+44	31	Promoted
2	IF Vesta, Uppsala	18	10	2	6	41	30	+11	22	
3	IFK Eskilstuna	18	10	1	7	39	27	+12	21	
4	BK Kenty, Linköping	18	9	3	6	43	32	+11	21	
5	IF Verdandi, Eskilstuna	18	8	4	6	38	42	−4	20	
6	IFK Kumla	18	7	4	7	41	41	0	18	
7	Hammarby IF, Stockholm	18	7	3	8	53	45	+8	17	
8	BK Derby, Linköping	18	8	1	9	40	38	+2	17	Relegated
9	IF Hallby, Jönköping	18	5	1	12	28	61	−33	11	Relegated
10	IFK Kristinehamn	18	0	2	16	25	76	−51	2	Relegated

=== Västra 1948–49 ===
Pos	Team	Pld	W	D	L	GF	GA	GD	Pts	Promotion or relegation
1	IF Viken, Åmål	18	13	1	4	47	26	+21	27	Promoted
2	Norrbygärde IF	18	12	1	5	51	22	+29	25	
3	Skene IF	18	12	0	6	56	37	+19	24	
4	IFK Trollhättan	18	7	5	6	40	31	+9	19	
5	Trollhättans IF	18	7	2	9	25	27	−2	16	
6	Lindholmens BK, Göteborg	18	8	0	10	36	40	−4	16	
7	Lundby IF, Göteborg	18	6	3	9	35	42	−7	15	
8	Uddevalla IS	18	6	3	9	30	48	−18	15	Relegated
9	IK Viking, Hagfors	18	7	1	10	30	50	−20	15	Relegated
10	IFK Uddevalla	18	2	4	12	25	52	−27	8	Relegated

=== Södra 1948–49 ===
Pos	Team	Pld	W	D	L	GF	GA	GD	Pts	Promotion or relegation
1	Huskvarna Södra IS	18	12	1	5	63	34	+29	25	Promoted
2	Hälsingborgs BIS	18	11	2	5	53	35	+18	24	
3	IFK Värnamo	18	9	5	4	40	30	+10	23	
4	Lunds BK	18	10	2	6	56	26	+30	22	
5	Falkenbergs FF	18	9	3	6	49	40	+9	21	
6	Kalmar AIK	18	8	3	7	56	46	+10	19	
7	Husqvarna IF	18	8	1	9	34	44	−10	17	
8	Ronneby BK	18	5	4	9	33	39	−6	14	Relegated
9	Olofströms IF	18	3	5	10	33	71	−38	11	Relegated
10	Växjö BK	18	2	0	16	33	85	−52	4	Relegated
