= 1931–32 Division 3 (Swedish football) =

Swedish League Division 3
- Season: 1931–321
- Champions: IFK Grängesberg; Djurgårdens IF; IK City; Billingsfors IK; Åtvidabergs IF; Kalmar FF; IFK Uddevalla; Malmö BIF
- Promoted: 22 teams
- Relegated: 12 teams

Statistics of Swedish football Division 3 for the 1931–32 season.

== League standings ==
=== Uppsvenska 1931–32 ===
| Pos | Team | Pld | W | D | L | GF | GA | GD | Pts | Promotion or relegation |
|---|---|---|---|---|---|---|---|---|---|---|
| 1 | IFK Grängesberg | 18 | 9 | 5 | 4 | 45 | 33 | +12 | 23 | Promoted |
| 2 | Brynäs IF, Gävle | 18 | 9 | 4 | 5 | 54 | 27 | +27 | 22 | Promoted |
| 3 | Söderhamns IF | 18 | 9 | 4 | 5 | 28 | 19 | +9 | 22 | |
| 4 | IFK Hedemora | 18 | 9 | 4 | 5 | 30 | 26 | +4 | 22 | |
| 5 | Ljusne AIK | 18 | 8 | 2 | 8 | 42 | 34 | +8 | 18 | |
| 6 | Skutskärs IF | 18 | 8 | 2 | 8 | 28 | 28 | 0 | 18 | |
| 7 | Ala IF | 18 | 6 | 5 | 7 | 31 | 41 | −10 | 17 | |
| 8 | Uppsala IF | 18 | 6 | 2 | 10 | 38 | 50 | −12 | 14 | |
| 9 | Avesta IF | 18 | 6 | 2 | 10 | 29 | 44 | −15 | 14 | Relegated |
| 10 | Hofors AIF | 18 | 3 | 4 | 11 | 32 | 55 | −23 | 10 | Relegated |

=== Östsvenska 1931–32 ===
| Pos | Team | Pld | W | D | L | GF | GA | GD | Pts | Promotion or relegation |
|---|---|---|---|---|---|---|---|---|---|---|
| 1 | Djurgårdens IF, Stockholm | 18 | 14 | 2 | 2 | 44 | 13 | +31 | 30 | Promoted |
| 2 | Reymersholms IK, Stockholm | 18 | 11 | 4 | 3 | 64 | 31 | +33 | 26 | Promoted |
| 3 | IFK Stockholm | 18 | 9 | 2 | 7 | 42 | 36 | +6 | 20 | |
| 4 | Enköpings SK | 18 | 6 | 8 | 4 | 28 | 26 | +2 | 20 | |
| 5 | Årsta SK, Stockholm | 18 | 7 | 5 | 6 | 33 | 28 | +5 | 19 | |
| 6 | Nyköpings BK | 18 | 7 | 3 | 8 | 29 | 35 | −6 | 17 | |
| 7 | Sundbybergs IK | 18 | 5 | 4 | 9 | 33 | 44 | −11 | 14 | |
| 8 | Hagalunds IS, Solna | 18 | 6 | 2 | 10 | 17 | 27 | −10 | 14 | |
| 9 | Huvudsta IS, Solna | 18 | 4 | 3 | 11 | 26 | 43 | −17 | 11 | Relegated |
| 10 | Kronobergs IK, Stockholm | 18 | 3 | 3 | 12 | 20 | 53 | −33 | 9 | Relegated |

=== Mellansvenska 1931–32 ===
| Pos | Team | Pld | W | D | L | GF | GA | GD | Pts | Promotion or relegation |
|---|---|---|---|---|---|---|---|---|---|---|
| 1 | IK City, Eskilstuna | 22 | 15 | 3 | 4 | 59 | 17 | +42 | 33 | Promoted |
| 2 | Örebro IK | 22 | 13 | 7 | 2 | 63 | 34 | +29 | 33 | Promoted |
| 3 | Katrineholms SK | 22 | 10 | 4 | 8 | 48 | 41 | +7 | 24 | |
| 4 | IF Verdandi, Eskilstuna | 22 | 10 | 4 | 8 | 52 | 53 | −1 | 24 | |
| 5 | IFK Lindesberg | 22 | 11 | 2 | 9 | 49 | 43 | +6 | 24 | |
| 6 | Fagersta AIK | 22 | 9 | 4 | 9 | 45 | 46 | −1 | 22 | |
| 7 | Örebro SK | 22 | 8 | 5 | 9 | 38 | 36 | +2 | 21 | |
| 8 | Västerås SK | 22 | 9 | 3 | 10 | 44 | 49 | −5 | 21 | |
| 9 | IF Rune, Kungsör | 22 | 8 | 4 | 10 | 45 | 46 | −1 | 20 | |
| 10 | Tunafors SK, Eskilstuna | 22 | 7 | 5 | 10 | 41 | 54 | −13 | 19 | |
| 11 | Köpings IS | 22 | 5 | 5 | 12 | 35 | 54 | −19 | 15 | Relegated |
| 12 | Katrineholms AIK | 22 | 2 | 4 | 16 | 28 | 74 | −46 | 8 | Relegated |

=== Nordvästra 1931–32 ===
| Pos | Team | Pld | W | D | L | GF | GA | GD | Pts | Promotion or relegation |
|---|---|---|---|---|---|---|---|---|---|---|
| 1 | Billingsfors IK | 20 | 13 | 5 | 2 | 71 | 22 | +49 | 31 | Promoted |
| 2 | Karlskoga IF | 20 | 11 | 6 | 3 | 51 | 31 | +20 | 28 | Promoted |
| 3 | Slottsbrons IF | 20 | 8 | 9 | 3 | 44 | 34 | +10 | 25 | Promoted |
| 4 | Degerfors IF | 20 | 9 | 6 | 5 | 45 | 32 | +13 | 24 | Promoted |
| 5 | Mariehofs IF, Karlstad | 20 | 9 | 4 | 7 | 53 | 34 | +19 | 22 | |
| 6 | Jannelunds SK | 20 | 9 | 4 | 7 | 38 | 28 | +10 | 22 | |
| 7 | IFK Åmål | 20 | 6 | 5 | 9 | 24 | 44 | −20 | 17 | |
| 8 | IFK Kristinehamn | 20 | 5 | 5 | 10 | 24 | 38 | −14 | 15 | |
| 9 | Almby IK | 20 | 7 | 1 | 12 | 27 | 47 | −20 | 15 | |
| 10 | Karlstads BK | 20 | 6 | 1 | 13 | 26 | 59 | −33 | 13 | |
| 11 | Skoghalls IF | 20 | 2 | 4 | 14 | 33 | 69 | −36 | 8 | Relegated |

=== Södra Mellansvenska 1931–32 ===
| Pos | Team | Pld | W | D | L | GF | GA | GD | Pts | Promotion or relegation |
|---|---|---|---|---|---|---|---|---|---|---|
| 1 | Åtvidabergs IF | 18 | 13 | 1 | 4 | 60 | 34 | +26 | 27 | Promoted |
| 2 | Motala AIF | 18 | 9 | 4 | 5 | 55 | 30 | +25 | 22 | Promoted |
| 3 | IK Tord, Jönköping | 18 | 9 | 4 | 5 | 50 | 35 | +15 | 22 | |
| 4 | Boxholms IF | 18 | 10 | 1 | 7 | 43 | 38 | +5 | 21 | |
| 5 | IFK Oskarshamn | 18 | 9 | 1 | 8 | 42 | 33 | +9 | 19 | |
| 6 | IF Sylvia, Norrköping | 18 | 7 | 2 | 9 | 36 | 48 | −12 | 16 | |
| 7 | Huskvarna IF | 18 | 7 | 1 | 10 | 30 | 38 | −8 | 15 | |
| 8 | Tranås AIF | 18 | 5 | 3 | 10 | 32 | 45 | −13 | 13 | |
| 9 | Vaggeryds IK | 18 | 5 | 3 | 10 | 42 | 68 | −26 | 13 | |
| 10 | Västerviks AIS | 18 | 5 | 2 | 11 | 30 | 51 | −21 | 12 | Relegated |

=== Sydöstra 1931–32 ===
| Pos | Team | Pld | W | D | L | GF | GA | GD | Pts | Promotion or relegation |
|---|---|---|---|---|---|---|---|---|---|---|
| 1 | Kalmar FF | 22 | 15 | 4 | 3 | 82 | 28 | +54 | 34 | Promoted |
| 2 | Kalmar AIK | 22 | 16 | 1 | 5 | 72 | 33 | +39 | 33 | Promoted |
| 3 | IFK Karlshamn | 22 | 11 | 5 | 6 | 51 | 44 | +7 | 27 | Promoted |
| 4 | Växjö BK | 22 | 11 | 3 | 8 | 43 | 46 | −3 | 25 | |
| 5 | Älmhults IF | 22 | 11 | 1 | 10 | 53 | 52 | +1 | 23 | |
| 6 | IFK Värnamo | 22 | 10 | 2 | 10 | 53 | 56 | −3 | 22 | |
| 7 | Nybro IF | 22 | 10 | 2 | 10 | 44 | 65 | −21 | 22 | |
| 8 | Hovmantorps GIF | 22 | 7 | 5 | 10 | 37 | 48 | −11 | 19 | |
| 9 | IFK Karlskrona | 22 | 7 | 3 | 12 | 63 | 55 | +8 | 17 | |
| 10 | Lessebo GIF | 22 | 6 | 4 | 12 | 43 | 54 | −11 | 16 | |
| 11 | Karlskrona BK | 22 | 8 | 0 | 14 | 53 | 86 | −33 | 16 | |
| 12 | Strömsnäsbruks IF | 22 | 4 | 2 | 16 | 29 | 74 | −45 | 10 | Relegated |

=== Västsvenska 1931–32 ===
| Pos | Team | Pld | W | D | L | GF | GA | GD | Pts | Promotion or relegation |
|---|---|---|---|---|---|---|---|---|---|---|
| 1 | IFK Uddevalla | 22 | 13 | 6 | 3 | 44 | 26 | +18 | 32 | Promoted |
| 2 | Krokslätts FF, Mölndal | 22 | 13 | 4 | 5 | 56 | 35 | +21 | 30 | Promoted |
| 3 | Jonsereds IF | 22 | 14 | 1 | 7 | 68 | 30 | +38 | 29 | Promoted |
| 4 | Surte IS | 22 | 8 | 9 | 5 | 39 | 35 | +4 | 25 | Promoted |
| 5 | Majornas IK, Göteborg | 22 | 8 | 5 | 9 | 41 | 45 | −4 | 21 | Promoted |
| 6 | Trollhättans IF | 22 | 7 | 6 | 9 | 34 | 40 | −6 | 20 | |
| 7 | Landala IF, Göteborg | 22 | 7 | 5 | 10 | 36 | 44 | −8 | 19 | |
| 8 | IF Heimer, Lidköping | 22 | 8 | 3 | 11 | 32 | 42 | −10 | 19 | |
| 9 | IFK Borås | 22 | 8 | 2 | 12 | 40 | 50 | −10 | 18 | |
| 10 | Gårda BK, Göteborg | 22 | 6 | 6 | 10 | 34 | 51 | −17 | 18 | |
| 11 | Lundby IF, Göteborg | 22 | 6 | 5 | 11 | 38 | 56 | −18 | 17 | |
| 12 | IFK Trollhättan | 22 | 6 | 4 | 12 | 36 | 47 | −11 | 16 | Relegated |

=== Sydsvenska 1931–32 ===
| Pos | Team | Pld | W | D | L | GF | GA | GD | Pts | Promotion or relegation |
|---|---|---|---|---|---|---|---|---|---|---|
| 1 | Malmö BIF | 18 | 11 | 3 | 4 | 43 | 23 | +20 | 25 | Promoted |
| 2 | Lunds BK | 18 | 11 | 2 | 5 | 51 | 38 | +13 | 24 | Promoted |
| 3 | IFK Hälsingborg | 18 | 10 | 3 | 5 | 38 | 32 | +6 | 23 | |
| 4 | Varbergs GIF | 18 | 9 | 3 | 6 | 39 | 26 | +13 | 21 | |
| 5 | Lunds GIF | 18 | 6 | 5 | 7 | 34 | 42 | −8 | 17 | |
| 6 | Oskarströms IF | 18 | 7 | 2 | 9 | 35 | 31 | +4 | 16 | |
| 7 | Falkenbergs FF | 18 | 7 | 2 | 9 | 28 | 46 | −18 | 16 | |
| 8 | Varbergs BoIS | 18 | 6 | 3 | 9 | 39 | 36 | +3 | 15 | |
| 9 | Halmstads AIS | 18 | 3 | 6 | 9 | 26 | 31 | −5 | 12 | Relegated |
| 10 | Limhamns IF | 18 | 5 | 1 | 12 | 30 | 51 | −21 | 11 | Relegated |
