= 1950–51 Division 3 (Swedish football) =

Swedish League Division 3
- Season: 1950–51
- Champions: Ludvika FFI; Motala AIF; BK Häcken; Ronneby BK
- Promoted: 4 teams above
- Relegated: 12 teams

Statistics of Swedish football Division 3 for the 1950–51 season.

== League standings ==
=== Norra 1950–51 ===
Pos	Team	Pld	W	D	L	GF	GA	GD	Pts	Promotion or relegation
1	Ludvika FFI	18	11	3	4	34	26	+8	25	Promoted
2	Hallstahammars SK	18	10	3	5	37	30	+7	23	
3	IFK Östersund	18	8	3	7	34	29	+5	19	
4	Ljusne AIK	18	8	3	7	39	36	+3	19	
5	Falu BS, Falun	18	8	3	7	29	27	+2	19	
6	Västerås SK	18	6	6	6	29	28	+1	18	
7	IF Vesta, Uppsala	18	7	3	8	43	34	+9	17	
8	Ljusdals IF	18	6	4	8	30	37	−7	16	Relegated
9	Hofors AIF	18	7	1	10	38	44	−6	15	Relegated
10	Fagerviks GF	18	3	3	12	25	47	−22	9	Relegated

=== Östra 1950–51 ===
Pos	Team	Pld	W	D	L	GF	GA	GD	Pts	Promotion or relegation
1	Motala AIF	18	12	3	3	49	22	+27	27	Promoted
2	IK Sleipner, Norrköping	18	10	3	5	47	30	+17	23	
3	IFK Eskilstuna	18	9	4	5	39	25	+14	22	
4	BK Hird, Norrköping	18	9	2	7	48	38	+10	20	
5	Älvsjö AIK	18	8	4	6	33	30	+3	20	
6	BK Kenty, Linköping	18	8	4	6	36	39	−3	20	
7	Hagalunds IS, Solna	18	6	5	7	36	40	−4	17	
8	Sundbybergs IK	18	6	1	11	40	49	−9	13	Relegated
9	BK Star, Södertälje	18	6	1	11	28	42	−14	13	Relegated
10	Reymersholms IK, Stockholm	18	1	3	14	19	60	−41	5	Relegated

=== Västra 1950–51 ===
Pos	Team	Pld	W	D	L	GF	GA	GD	Pts	Promotion or relegation
1	BK Häcken, Göteborg	18	11	2	5	41	22	+19	24	Promoted
2	Tidaholms GIF	18	9	5	4	49	34	+15	23	
3	IFK Trollhättan	18	10	1	7	39	31	+8	21	
4	Vänersborgs IF	18	8	4	6	42	35	+7	20	
5	Jonsereds IF	18	6	6	6	36	42	−6	18	
6	IFK Tidaholm	18	6	5	7	44	37	+7	17	
7	Krokslätts FF, Mölndal	18	7	3	8	38	40	−2	17	
8	Mustadfors IF	18	5	7	6	46	49	−3	17	Relegated
9	Lindholmens BK, Göteborg	18	5	5	8	24	44	−20	15	Relegated
10	IFK Åmål	18	2	4	12	19	44	−25	8	Relegated

=== Södra 1950–51 ===
Pos	Team	Pld	W	D	L	GF	GA	GD	Pts	Promotion or relegation
1	Ronneby BK	18	9	6	3	44	32	+12	24	Promoted
2	Husqvarna IF	18	10	0	8	43	27	+16	20	
3	Nybro IF	18	8	4	6	41	33	+8	20	
4	Kävlinge GIF	18	9	2	7	46	40	+6	20	
5	Kalmar AIK	18	8	3	7	31	34	−3	19	
6	Alets IK	18	7	4	7	38	33	+5	18	
7	Limmareds IF	18	7	4	7	36	38	−2	18	
8	Skene IF	18	7	2	9	32	34	−2	16	Relegated
9	BK Drott, Hälsingborg	18	7	1	10	25	46	−21	15	Relegated
10	IFK Värnamo	18	4	2	12	33	52	−19	10	Relegated
