= 1935–36 Division 3 (Swedish football) =

Swedish League Division 3
- Season: 1935–36
- Champions: Söderhamns IF; IFK Grängesberg; Reymersholms IK; IF Rune; Karlstads BIK; IK Tord; Växjö BK; Tidaholms GIF; Lundby IF; BK Landora
- Promoted: 8 teams
- Relegated: 21 teams

Statistics of Swedish football Division 3 for the 1935–36 season.

== League standings ==
=== Uppsvenska Östra 1935–36 ===
Pos	Team	Pld	W	D	L	GF	GA	GD	Pts	Promotion or relegation
1	Söderhamns IF	16	12	3	1	44	11	+33	27	Promotion Playoffs
2	Skärgårdens IF, Sandarne	16	12	2	2	51	17	+34	26	
3	Strands IF, Hudiksvall	16	11	1	4	39	18	+21	23	
4	Iggesunds IK	16	7	0	9	25	31	−6	14	
5	Strömsbruks IF	16	4	6	6	28	35	−7	14	
6	Brobergs IF, Söderhamn	16	5	4	7	21	29	−8	14	
7	Stugsunds IK	16	5	2	9	32	41	−9	12	
8	Ala IF	16	3	2	11	17	42	−25	8	Relegated
9	IFK Bergvik	16	3	0	13	21	54	−33	6	Relegated

=== Uppsvenska Västra 1935–36 ===
Pos	Team	Pld	W	D	L	GF	GA	GD	Pts	Promotion or relegation
1	IFK Grängesberg	18	13	1	4	52	23	+29	27	Promotion Playoffs – Promoted
2	Brynäs IF, Gävle	18	12	1	5	51	29	+22	25	
3	Avesta IF	18	11	2	5	50	33	+17	24	
4	Sandvikens AIK	18	10	3	5	41	24	+17	23	
5	Skutskärs IF	18	9	1	8	26	26	0	19	
6	Avesta AIK	18	8	1	9	24	35	−11	17	
7	Örtakoloniens IF, Sandviken	18	7	1	10	28	30	−2	15	
8	Falu BK, Falun	18	6	1	11	25	52	−27	13	
9	Hofors AIF	18	4	2	12	23	34	−11	10	
10	Holmens IF	18	2	3	13	20	54	−34	7	Relegated

=== Östsvenska 1935–36 ===
Pos	Team	Pld	W	D	L	GF	GA	GD	Pts	Promotion or relegation
1	Reymersholms IK, Stockholm	18	15	2	1	71	22	+49	32	Promoted
2	Nyköpings BK	18	13	2	3	63	30	+33	28	
3	IF Vesta, Uppsala	18	10	1	7	45	39	+6	21	
4	IK Sture, Stockholm	18	10	0	8	30	32	−2	20	
5	Djursholms IS	18	8	2	8	29	33	−4	18	
6	Enköpings SK	18	7	3	8	45	34	+11	17	
7	Enskede IK	18	6	2	10	21	33	−12	14	
8	Heby AIF	18	5	2	11	22	54	−32	12	
9	Westermalms IF, Stockholm	18	3	3	12	23	43	−20	9	Relegated
10	Västerås SK	18	4	1	13	15	44	−29	9	Relegated

=== Mellansvenska 1935–36 ===
Pos	Team	Pld	W	D	L	GF	GA	GD	Pts	Promotion or relegation
1	IF Rune, Kungsör	18	14	1	3	69	29	+40	29	Promoted
2	IK City, Eskilstuna	18	9	6	3	44	27	+17	24	
3	Frövi IK	18	8	3	7	44	46	−2	19	
4	Laxå IF	18	9	1	8	32	40	−8	19	
5	Örebro IK	18	7	4	7	32	33	−1	18	
6	Katrineholms AIK	18	7	3	8	38	35	+3	17	
7	IF Verdandi, Eskilstuna	18	6	3	9	33	38	−5	15	
8	IFK Lindesberg	18	5	4	9	36	48	−12	14	Relegated
9	IFK Arboga	18	4	6	8	33	51	−18	14	Relegated
10	Katrineholms SK	18	4	3	11	32	46	−14	11	Relegated

=== Nordvästra 1935–36 ===
Pos	Team	Pld	W	D	L	GF	GA	GD	Pts	Promotion or relegation
1	Karlstads BIK	18	10	6	2	41	26	+15	26	Promoted
2	Mariehofs IF, Karlstad	18	10	5	3	50	28	+22	25	
3	Arvika BK	18	7	7	4	45	34	+11	21	
4	Deje IK	18	8	3	7	53	43	+10	19	
5	Slottsbrons IF	18	6	7	5	30	25	+5	19	
6	IF Örnen, Kristinehamn	18	7	5	6	40	36	+4	19	
7	IFK Åmål	18	5	5	8	34	48	−14	15	
8	Jannelunds SK	18	5	4	9	32	49	−17	14	Relegated
9	Melleruds IF	18	5	3	10	34	50	−16	13	Relegated
10	Mustadfors IF	18	2	5	11	35	55	−20	9	Relegated

=== Södra Mellansvenska 1935–36 ===
Pos	Team	Pld	W	D	L	GF	GA	GD	Pts	Promotion or relegation
1	IK Tord, Jönköping	18	11	5	2	54	25	+29	27	Promoted
2	Finspångs IK	18	12	3	3	52	25	+27	27	
3	Motala AIF	18	9	3	6	33	37	−4	21	
4	Finspångs AIF	18	7	4	7	40	36	+4	18	
5	Åtvidabergs FF	18	6	5	7	46	39	+7	17	
6	Waggeryds IK	18	7	3	8	27	31	−4	17	
7	Jönköping Södra IF	18	6	4	8	26	31	−5	16	
8	IFK Oskarshamn	18	5	3	10	33	48	−15	13	
9	Tranås AIF	18	3	6	9	23	40	−17	12	Relegated
10	IF Sylvia, Norrköping	18	5	2	11	26	48	−22	12	Relegated

=== Sydöstra 1935–36 ===
Pos	Team	Pld	W	D	L	GF	GA	GD	Pts	Promotion or relegation
1	Växjö BK	18	13	1	4	52	29	+23	27	Promoted
2	IFK Karlshamn	18	12	2	4	52	26	+26	26	
3	Kalmar AIK	18	10	2	6	54	27	+27	22	
4	IFK Karlskrona	18	10	2	6	35	26	+9	22	
5	Nybro IF	18	10	1	7	50	43	+7	21	
6	Kalmar FF	18	9	1	8	48	31	+17	19	
7	Hovmantorps GIF	18	7	3	8	30	39	−9	17	
8	Karlshamns FF	18	7	1	10	39	50	−11	15	
9	Alvesta GIF	18	3	1	14	27	65	−38	7	Relegated
10	Kosta IF	18	2	0	16	27	78	−51	4	Relegated

=== Västsvenska Norra 1935–36 ===
Pos	Team	Pld	W	D	L	GF	GA	GD	Pts	Promotion or relegation
1	Tidaholms GIF	18	13	1	4	51	27	+24	27	Promotion Playoffs – Promoted
2	IFK Uddevalla	18	13	1	4	46	22	+24	27	
3	Trollhättans IF	18	7	6	5	28	37	−9	20	
4	Kinna IF	18	8	3	7	39	30	+9	19	
5	Skara IF	18	6	7	5	48	46	+2	19	
6	Munkedals IF	18	8	2	8	39	38	+1	18	
7	Fritsla IF	18	7	3	8	32	35	−3	17	
8	Surte IS	18	6	3	9	44	43	+1	15	
9	IFK Hjo	18	4	5	9	22	32	−10	13	
10	Lysekils FF	18	1	3	14	23	66	−43	5	Relegated

=== Västsvenska Södra 1935–36 ===
Pos	Team	Pld	W	D	L	GF	GA	GD	Pts	Promotion or relegation
1	Lundby IF, Göteborg	18	14	1	3	84	32	+52	29	Promotion Playoffs
2	Skogens IF, Göteborg	18	11	0	7	61	35	+26	22	
3	Krokslätts FF, Mölndal	18	11	0	7	39	35	+4	22	
4	Oskarströms IS	18	8	5	5	49	26	+23	21	
5	Varbergs BoIS	18	8	3	7	39	31	+8	19	
6	Göteborgs AIK	18	9	1	8	44	44	0	19	
7	Falkenbergs FF	18	9	0	9	53	48	+5	18	
8	Mölnlycke IF	18	7	2	9	42	47	−5	16	Relegated
9	IFK Mölndal	18	6	0	12	24	69	−45	12	Relegated
10	Kungsbacka IF	18	1	0	17	23	91	−68	2	Relegated

=== Sydsvenska 1935–36 ===
Pos	Team	Pld	W	D	L	GF	GA	GD	Pts	Promotion or relegation
1	BK Landora, Landskrona	18	10	4	4	40	21	+19	24	Promoted
2	Klippans BoIF	18	10	4	4	41	25	+16	24	
3	Bromölla IF	18	8	7	3	33	26	+7	23	
4	Lunds GIF	18	8	4	6	58	32	+26	20	
5	Ystads IF	18	8	3	7	39	33	+6	19	
6	IFK Trelleborg	18	7	3	8	28	32	−4	17	
7	Stattena IF, Hälsingborg	18	8	0	10	34	52	−18	16	
8	Lunds BK	18	5	4	9	20	43	−23	14	
9	BK Drott, Hälsingborg	18	5	3	10	29	39	−10	13	Relegated
10	Trelleborgs BK	18	3	4	11	25	44	−19	10	Relegated
