= 1951–52 Division 3 (Swedish football) =

Swedish League Division 3
- Season: 1951–52
- Champions: Västerås SK; BK Derby; Örgryte IS; IFK Trelleborg
- Promoted: 4 teams above
- Relegated: 12 teams

Statistics of Swedish football Division 3 for the 1951–52 season.

== League standings ==
=== Norra 1951–52 ===
Pos	Team	Pld	W	D	L	GF	GA	GD	Pts	Promotion or relegation
1	Västerås SK	18	12	2	4	41	21	+20	26	Promoted
2	IFK Östersund	18	9	5	4	34	25	+9	23	
3	Surahammars IF	18	10	2	6	35	22	+13	22	
4	Avesta AIK	18	8	5	5	44	43	+1	21	
5	Falu BS, Falun	18	8	3	7	34	30	+4	19	
6	GIF Sundsvall	18	6	5	7	28	39	−11	17	
7	Ljusne AIK	18	7	2	9	39	36	+3	16	
8	Hallstahammars SK	18	5	4	9	33	37	−4	14	Relegated
9	IFK Grängesberg	18	5	3	10	23	37	−14	13	Relegated
10	IF Vesta, Uppsala	18	4	1	13	28	49	−21	9	Relegated

=== Östra 1951–52 ===
Pos	Team	Pld	W	D	L	GF	GA	GD	Pts	Promotion or relegation
1	BK Derby, Linköping	18	11	4	3	54	23	+31	26	Promoted
2	IK Sleipner, Norrköping	18	11	2	5	52	26	+26	24	
3	Karlskoga IF	18	9	5	4	34	26	+8	23	
4	IFK Eskilstuna	18	9	3	6	39	27	+12	21	
5	BK Kenty, Linköping	18	8	4	6	42	35	+7	20	
6	IFK Bofors	18	7	4	7	46	44	+2	18	
7	BK Hird, Norrköping	18	6	2	10	30	38	−8	14	
8	Gröndals IK	18	5	4	9	29	45	−16	14	Relegated
9	Älvsjö AIK	18	5	1	12	31	66	−35	11	Relegated
10	Hagalunds IS, Solna	18	4	1	13	31	58	−27	9	Relegated

=== Västra 1951–52 ===
Pos	Team	Pld	W	D	L	GF	GA	GD	Pts	Promotion or relegation
1	Örgryte IS, Göteborg	18	11	6	1	49	19	+30	28	Promoted
2	IFK Trollhättan	18	10	4	4	53	32	+21	24	
3	Hällefors AIF	18	10	3	5	44	29	+15	23	
4	Redbergslids IK, Göteborg	18	10	2	6	44	31	+13	22	
5	Tidaholms GIF	18	8	2	8	45	36	+9	18	
6	Vänersborgs IF	18	7	4	7	49	47	+2	18	
7	Trollhättans IF	18	5	7	6	41	43	−2	17	
8	Krokslätts FF, Mölndal	18	5	3	10	28	48	−20	13	Relegated
9	Jonsereds IF	18	3	3	12	26	59	−33	9	Relegated
10	IFK Tidaholm	18	2	4	12	28	63	−35	8	Relegated

=== Södra 1951–52 ===
Pos	Team	Pld	W	D	L	GF	GA	GD	Pts	Promotion or relegation
1	IFK Trelleborg	18	12	4	2	42	22	+20	28	Promoted
2	Husqvarna IF	18	10	4	4	50	28	+22	24	
3	Kalmar AIK	18	9	2	7	49	38	+11	20	
4	Huskvarna Södra IS	18	6	6	6	37	41	−4	18	
5	Falkenbergs FF	18	6	6	6	37	44	−7	18	
6	Nybro IF	18	5	6	7	33	32	+1	16	
7	Östers IF, Växjö	18	7	2	9	30	31	−1	16	
8	Limmareds IF	18	5	6	7	27	39	−12	16	Relegated
9	Kävlinge GIF	18	5	6	7	29	42	−13	16	Relegated
10	Alets IK	18	3	2	13	19	36	−17	8	Relegated
