= 1933–34 Division 3 (Swedish football) =

Swedish League Division 3
- Season: 1933–34
- Champions: Bollnäs GIF; Årsta SK; IF Rune; Degerfors IF; Västerviks AIS; IFK Värnamo; Landala IF; Ängelholms IF
- Promoted: 8 teams above
- Relegated: 13 teams

Statistics of Swedish football Division 3 for the 1933–34 season.

== League standings ==
=== Uppsvenska 1933–34 ===
Pos	Team	Pld	W	D	L	GF	GA	GD	Pts	Promotion or relegation
1	Bollnäs GIF	18	12	3	3	42	31	+11	27	Promoted
2	Skärgårdens IF, Sandarne	18	11	2	5	44	27	+17	24	
3	Skutskärs IF	18	8	4	6	31	26	+5	20	
4	Sandvikens AIK	18	5	8	5	24	29	−5	18	
5	Söderhamns IF	18	6	5	7	30	35	−5	17	
6	Ala IF	18	6	4	8	18	22	−4	16	
7	Iggesunds IK	18	5	5	8	25	22	+3	15	
8	Holmens IF	18	5	5	8	26	32	−6	15	
9	Älvkarleby IK	18	4	6	8	32	39	−7	14	
10	Söderfors GIF	18	6	2	10	28	37	−9	14	Relegated

=== Östsvenska 1933–34 ===
Pos	Team	Pld	W	D	L	GF	GA	GD	Pts	Promotion or relegation
1	Årsta SK, Stockholm	18	15	1	2	55	22	+33	31	Promoted
2	Uppsala IF	18	11	2	5	42	33	+9	24	
3	Westermalms IF, Stockholm	18	9	3	6	41	23	+18	21	
4	Enköpings SK	18	8	2	8	31	28	+3	18	
5	Västerås SK	18	6	4	8	32	32	0	16	
6	Enskede IK	18	6	4	8	31	35	−4	16	
7	Nyköpings BK	18	6	4	8	24	34	−10	16	
8	IK Sture, Stockholm	18	5	5	8	32	38	−6	15	
9	Hagalunds IS, Solna	18	6	3	9	30	39	−9	15	Relegated
10	IFK Stockholm	18	4	0	14	22	56	−34	8	Relegated

=== Mellansvenska 1933–34 ===
Pos	Team	Pld	W	D	L	GF	GA	GD	Pts	Promotion or relegation
1	IF Rune, Kungsör	18	11	5	2	58	24	+34	27	Promoted
2	Fagersta AIK	18	9	5	4	36	23	+13	23	
3	Katrineholms SK	18	8	3	7	41	32	+9	19	
4	IK City, Eskilstuna	18	6	7	5	29	28	+1	19	
5	IFK Arboga	18	8	2	8	33	37	−4	18	
6	Örebro IK	18	9	0	9	39	53	−14	18	
7	IFK Lindesberg	18	7	3	8	31	32	−1	17	
8	Katrineholms AIK	18	7	0	11	29	42	−13	14	
9	IF Verdandi, Eskilstuna	18	5	3	10	36	41	−5	13	Relegated
10	Köpings IS	18	3	6	9	24	34	−10	12	Relegated

=== Nordvästra 1933–34 ===
Pos	Team	Pld	W	D	L	GF	GA	GD	Pts	Promotion or relegation
1	Degerfors IF	18	14	2	2	60	22	+38	30	Promoted
2	Jannelunds SK	18	11	3	4	62	35	+27	25	
3	Mariehofs IF, Karlstad	18	10	3	5	39	20	+19	23	
4	Arvika BK	18	8	3	7	36	33	+3	19	
5	IFK Kristinehamn	18	7	4	7	30	32	−2	18	
6	IFK Åmål	18	6	4	8	30	34	−4	16	
7	Karlstads BK	18	6	3	9	37	48	−11	15	
8	Yxhults IK	18	5	4	9	24	39	−15	14	
9	Munkfors AIF	18	5	2	11	25	60	−35	12	Relegated
10	Almby IK	18	2	4	12	29	49	−20	8	Relegated

=== Södra Mellansvenska 1933–34 ===
Pos	Team	Pld	W	D	L	GF	GA	GD	Pts	Promotion or relegation
1	Västerviks AIS	18	9	6	3	53	36	+17	24	Promoted
2	IK Tord, Jönköping	18	10	3	5	38	27	+11	23	
3	IF Sylvia, Norrköping	18	9	4	5	35	40	−5	22	
4	Skärblacka IF	18	7	5	6	38	28	+10	19	
5	Boxholms IF	18	7	3	8	56	50	+6	17	
6	Jönköping Södra IF	18	6	4	8	27	33	−6	16	
7	IFK Oskarshamn	18	7	2	9	31	39	−8	16	
8	Finspångs IK	18	7	2	9	32	41	−9	16	
9	Hvetlanda GIF, Vetlanda	18	6	3	9	39	50	−11	15	Relegated
10	Tranås AIF	18	3	6	9	33	38	−5	12	Relegated

=== Sydöstra 1933–34 ===
Pos	Team	Pld	W	D	L	GF	GA	GD	Pts	Promotion or relegation
1	IFK Värnamo	18	16	0	2	65	23	+42	32	Promoted
2	Hovmantorps GIF	18	10	2	6	44	31	+13	22	
3	Växjö BK	18	8	5	5	45	32	+13	21	
4	IFK Karlskrona	18	10	0	8	38	24	+14	20	
5	Kalmar AIK	18	7	5	6	35	27	+8	19	
6	Växjö FF	18	7	5	6	24	28	−4	19	
7	IFK Karlshamn	18	7	4	7	38	39	−1	18	
8	Nybro IF	18	6	3	9	30	42	−12	15	
9	Karlskrona BK	18	2	3	13	23	52	−29	7	Relegated
10	Älmhults IF	18	3	1	14	16	60	−44	7	Relegated

=== Västsvenska 1933–34 ===
Pos	Team	Pld	W	D	L	GF	GA	GD	Pts	Promotion or relegation
1	Landala IF, Göteborg	18	14	1	3	48	24	+24	29	Promoted
2	Alingsås IF	18	12	3	3	48	23	+25	27	
3	Fritsla IF	18	8	4	6	42	37	+5	20	
4	Skogens IF, Göteborg	18	9	0	9	45	44	+1	18	
5	Lundby IF, Göteborg	18	9	0	9	51	51	0	18	
6	Munkedals IF	18	7	3	8	36	43	−7	17	
7	Majornas IK, Göteborg	18	7	1	10	44	43	+1	15	
8	Skara IF	18	6	2	10	49	55	−6	14	
9	Trollhättans IF	18	6	2	10	28	53	−25	14	
10	Uddevalla IS	18	2	4	12	35	53	−18	8	

=== Sydsvenska 1933–34 ===
Pos	Team	Pld	W	D	L	GF	GA	GD	Pts	Promotion or relegation
1	Ängelholms IF	18	13	2	3	52	32	+20	28	Promoted
2	IFK Kristianstad	18	12	3	3	68	28	+40	27	
3	Oskarströms IF	18	11	3	4	55	28	+27	25	
4	Varbergs GIF	18	10	4	4	67	45	+22	24	
5	Klippans BoIF	18	10	3	5	41	28	+13	23	
6	Varbergs BoIS	18	8	1	9	57	36	+21	17	
7	IFK Trelleborg	18	4	3	11	33	50	−17	11	
8	Lunds GIF	18	2	7	9	29	53	−24	11	
9	IS Hallandia, Oskarström	18	3	3	12	21	59	−38	9	Relegated
10	Sölvesborgs GIF	18	2	1	15	20	84	−64	5	Relegated
