= 1930–31 Division 3 (Swedish football) =

Swedish League Division 3
- Season: 1930–31
- Champions: Skärgårdens IF; Djurgårdens IF; IFK Kumla; Slottsbrons IF; Mjölby AIF; Växjö BK; Krokslätts FF; Höganäs BK
- Promoted: Skärgårdens IF; IFK Kumla; Mjölby AIF; Höganäs BK
- Relegated: 16 teams

Statistics of Swedish football Division 3 for the 1930–31 season.

== League standings ==
=== Uppsvenska 1930–31 ===
| Pos | Team | Pld | W | D | L | GF | GA | GD | Pts | Promotion or relegation |
|---|---|---|---|---|---|---|---|---|---|---|
| 1 | Skärgårdens IF, Sandarne | 16 | 12 | 3 | 1 | 68 | 22 | +46 | 27 | Promotion Playoffs – Promoted |
| 2 | Skutskärs IF | 16 | 11 | 3 | 2 | 58 | 17 | +41 | 25 | |
| 3 | Ljusne AIK | 16 | 10 | 0 | 6 | 41 | 25 | +16 | 20 | |
| 4 | Brynäs IF, Gävle | 16 | 7 | 2 | 7 | 54 | 35 | +19 | 16 | |
| 5 | Ala IF | 16 | 5 | 2 | 9 | 31 | 39 | −8 | 12 | |
| 6 | IFK Hedemora | 16 | 4 | 4 | 8 | 23 | 52 | −29 | 12 | |
| 7 | IFK Grängesberg | 16 | 5 | 2 | 9 | 25 | 59 | −34 | 12 | |
| 8 | Kvarnsvedens GIF | 16 | 5 | 1 | 10 | 23 | 56 | −33 | 11 | Relegated |
| 9 | Söderfors GoIF | 16 | 3 | 3 | 10 | 25 | 43 | −18 | 9 | Relegated |

=== Östsvenska 1930–31 ===
| Pos | Team | Pld | W | D | L | GF | GA | GD | Pts | Qualification or relegation |
|---|---|---|---|---|---|---|---|---|---|---|
| 1 | Djurgårdens IF, Stockholm | 20 | 15 | 3 | 2 | 67 | 20 | +47 | 33 | Promotion Playoffs |
| 2 | Sundbybergs IK | 20 | 11 | 5 | 4 | 61 | 29 | +32 | 27 | |
| 3 | Nyköpings BK | 20 | 9 | 5 | 6 | 47 | 39 | +8 | 23 | |
| 4 | Reymersholms IK, Stockholm | 20 | 9 | 2 | 9 | 45 | 38 | +7 | 20 | |
| 5 | Enköpings SK | 20 | 8 | 4 | 8 | 46 | 48 | −2 | 20 | |
| 6 | IFK Stockholm | 20 | 6 | 7 | 7 | 33 | 40 | −7 | 19 | |
| 7 | Kronobergs IK, Stockholm | 20 | 9 | 1 | 10 | 47 | 57 | −10 | 19 | |
| 8 | Hagalunds IS, Solna | 20 | 7 | 3 | 10 | 40 | 46 | −6 | 17 | |
| 9 | Huvudsta IS, Solna | 20 | 6 | 4 | 10 | 28 | 37 | −9 | 16 | |
| 10 | IF Norden, Sala | 20 | 5 | 4 | 11 | 35 | 65 | −30 | 14 | Relegated |
| 11 | Södertälje SK | 20 | 4 | 4 | 12 | 21 | 51 | −30 | 12 | Relegated |

=== Mellansvenska 1930–31 ===
| Pos | Team | Pld | W | D | L | GF | GA | GD | Pts | Qualification or relegation |
|---|---|---|---|---|---|---|---|---|---|---|
| 1 | IFK Kumla | 22 | 15 | 4 | 3 | 64 | 24 | +40 | 34 | Promotion Playoffs – Promoted |
| 2 | Örebro SK | 22 | 15 | 0 | 7 | 61 | 34 | +27 | 30 | |
| 3 | Tunafors SK, Eskilstuna | 22 | 11 | 3 | 8 | 49 | 47 | +2 | 25 | |
| 4 | Katrineholms SK | 22 | 10 | 4 | 8 | 52 | 46 | +6 | 24 | |
| 4 | Örebro IK | 22 | 10 | 4 | 8 | 52 | 46 | +6 | 24 | |
| 6 | Fagersta AIK | 22 | 10 | 1 | 11 | 40 | 43 | −3 | 21 | |
| 7 | IF Rune, Kungsör | 22 | 9 | 2 | 11 | 51 | 55 | −4 | 20 | |
| 8 | Västerås SK | 22 | 9 | 2 | 11 | 38 | 48 | −10 | 20 | |
| 9 | IF Verdandi, Eskilstuna | 22 | 7 | 4 | 11 | 36 | 43 | −7 | 18 | |
| 10 | Köpings IS | 22 | 7 | 3 | 12 | 34 | 53 | −19 | 17 | |
| 11 | Kolsva IF | 22 | 5 | 6 | 11 | 33 | 63 | −30 | 16 | Relegated |
| 12 | IFK Örebro | 22 | 7 | 1 | 14 | 42 | 54 | −12 | 15 | Relegated |

=== Nordvästra 1930–31 ===
| Pos | Team | Pld | W | D | L | GF | GA | GD | Pts | Qualification or relegation |
|---|---|---|---|---|---|---|---|---|---|---|
| 1 | Slottsbrons IF | 18 | 11 | 4 | 3 | 44 | 33 | +11 | 26 | Promotion Playoffs |
| 2 | Karlskoga IF | 18 | 10 | 5 | 3 | 49 | 21 | +28 | 25 | |
| 3 | Jannelunds SK | 18 | 9 | 3 | 6 | 48 | 32 | +16 | 21 | |
| 4 | Degerfors IF | 18 | 9 | 2 | 7 | 46 | 41 | +5 | 20 | |
| 5 | Almby IK | 18 | 8 | 3 | 7 | 47 | 39 | +8 | 19 | |
| 6 | IFK Åmål | 18 | 4 | 8 | 6 | 38 | 37 | +1 | 16 | |
| 7 | Karlstads BK | 18 | 4 | 6 | 8 | 32 | 47 | −15 | 14 | |
| 8 | Skoghalls IF | 18 | 6 | 1 | 11 | 31 | 49 | −18 | 13 | |
| 9 | Håvreströms IF | 18 | 5 | 3 | 10 | 26 | 49 | −23 | 13 | Relegated |
| 10 | IF Viken, Åmål | 18 | 4 | 5 | 9 | 16 | 29 | −13 | 13 | Relegated |

=== Södra Mellansvenska 1930–31 ===
| Pos | Team | Pld | W | D | L | GF | GA | GD | Pts | Promotion or relegation |
|---|---|---|---|---|---|---|---|---|---|---|
| 1 | Mjölby AIF | 20 | 13 | 3 | 4 | 59 | 35 | +24 | 29 | Promotion Playoffs – Promoted |
| 2 | Motala AIF | 20 | 11 | 3 | 6 | 57 | 37 | +20 | 25 | |
| 3 | IFK Oskarshamn | 20 | 11 | 2 | 7 | 43 | 37 | +6 | 24 | |
| 4 | Boxholms IF | 20 | 10 | 3 | 7 | 45 | 39 | +6 | 23 | |
| 5 | Västerviks AIS | 20 | 9 | 3 | 8 | 38 | 44 | −6 | 21 | |
| 6 | Åtvidabergs IF | 20 | 9 | 2 | 9 | 53 | 48 | +5 | 20 | |
| 7 | IK Tord, Jönköping | 20 | 6 | 7 | 7 | 45 | 38 | +7 | 19 | |
| 8 | Tranås AIF | 20 | 7 | 3 | 10 | 38 | 43 | −5 | 17 | |
| 9 | Huskvarna IF | 20 | 6 | 4 | 10 | 30 | 47 | −17 | 16 | |
| 10 | IFK Västervik | 20 | 6 | 3 | 11 | 35 | 44 | −9 | 15 | Relegated |
| 11 | Norrköpings SK | 20 | 5 | 1 | 14 | 32 | 63 | −31 | 11 | Relegated |

=== Sydöstra 1930–31 ===
| Pos | Team | Pld | W | D | L | GF | GA | GD | Pts | Qualification or relegation |
|---|---|---|---|---|---|---|---|---|---|---|
| 1 | Växjö BK | 18 | 10 | 7 | 1 | 56 | 25 | +31 | 27 | Promotion Playoffs |
| 2 | IFK Karlskrona | 18 | 12 | 3 | 3 | 70 | 38 | +32 | 27 | |
| 3 | Hovmantorps GIF | 18 | 8 | 3 | 7 | 35 | 29 | +6 | 19 | |
| 4 | Lessebo GIF | 18 | 7 | 5 | 6 | 48 | 41 | +7 | 19 | |
| 5 | IFK Värnamo | 18 | 8 | 3 | 7 | 45 | 52 | −7 | 19 | |
| 6 | IFK Karlshamn | 18 | 7 | 3 | 8 | 26 | 28 | −2 | 17 | |
| 7 | Älmhults GIF | 18 | 6 | 3 | 9 | 26 | 39 | −13 | 15 | |
| 8 | Nybro IF | 18 | 5 | 4 | 9 | 31 | 46 | −15 | 14 | |
| 9 | Alvesta GIF | 18 | 4 | 4 | 10 | 32 | 53 | −21 | 12 | Relegated |
| 10 | Flottans IF, Karlskrona | 18 | 4 | 3 | 11 | 43 | 61 | −18 | 11 | Relegated |

=== Västsvenska 1930–31 ===
| Pos | Team | Pld | W | D | L | GF | GA | GD | Pts | Qualification or relegation |
|---|---|---|---|---|---|---|---|---|---|---|
| 1 | Krokslätts FF, Mölndal | 22 | 15 | 4 | 3 | 62 | 31 | +31 | 34 | Promotion Playoffs |
| 2 | Trollhättans IF | 22 | 14 | 5 | 3 | 58 | 30 | +28 | 33 | |
| 3 | IFK Uddevalla | 22 | 14 | 3 | 5 | 65 | 38 | +27 | 31 | |
| 4 | Jonsereds IF | 22 | 12 | 5 | 5 | 64 | 32 | +32 | 29 | |
| 5 | IFK Trollhättan | 22 | 9 | 2 | 11 | 39 | 38 | +1 | 20 | |
| 6 | Lundby IF, Göteborg | 22 | 8 | 4 | 10 | 50 | 53 | −3 | 20 | |
| 7 | Landala IF, Göteborg | 22 | 7 | 5 | 10 | 31 | 43 | −12 | 19 | |
| 8 | Majornas IK, Göteborg | 22 | 9 | 1 | 12 | 40 | 56 | −16 | 19 | |
| 9 | IFK Borås | 22 | 8 | 2 | 12 | 44 | 53 | −9 | 18 | |
| 10 | Surte IS | 22 | 6 | 6 | 10 | 39 | 50 | −11 | 18 | |
| 11 | Uddevalla IS | 22 | 5 | 2 | 15 | 31 | 68 | −37 | 12 | Relegated |
| 12 | IF Welox, Göteborg | 22 | 4 | 3 | 15 | 32 | 63 | −31 | 11 | Relegated |

=== Sydsvenska 1930–31 ===
| Pos | Team | Pld | W | D | L | GF | GA | GD | Pts | Promotion or relegation |
|---|---|---|---|---|---|---|---|---|---|---|
| 1 | Höganäs BK | 20 | 15 | 4 | 1 | 71 | 31 | +40 | 34 | Promotion Playoffs – Promoted |
| 2 | IFK Hälsingborg | 20 | 10 | 7 | 3 | 53 | 27 | +26 | 27 | |
| 3 | Malmö BIF | 20 | 10 | 6 | 4 | 46 | 29 | +17 | 26 | |
| 4 | Limhamns IF | 20 | 9 | 3 | 8 | 45 | 45 | 0 | 21 | |
| 5 | Varbergs BoIS | 20 | 8 | 4 | 8 | 41 | 38 | +3 | 20 | |
| 6 | Lunds BK | 20 | 7 | 4 | 9 | 35 | 38 | −3 | 18 | |
| 7 | Halmstads AIS | 20 | 7 | 4 | 9 | 23 | 36 | −13 | 18 | |
| 8 | Varbergs GIF | 20 | 8 | 1 | 11 | 60 | 57 | +3 | 17 | |
| 9 | Falkenbergs FF | 20 | 7 | 2 | 11 | 37 | 61 | −24 | 16 | |
| 10 | IFK Trelleborg | 20 | 6 | 2 | 12 | 44 | 53 | −9 | 14 | Relegated |
| 11 | IFK Höganäs | 20 | 2 | 5 | 13 | 19 | 59 | −40 | 9 | Relegated |
