= 1961 Division 2 (Swedish football) =

Swedish League Division 2
- Season: 1961
- Champions: GIF Sundsvall; Djurgårdens IF; Östers IF; Högadals IF
- Promoted: Djurgårdens IF; Högadals IF
- Relegated: IF Friska Viljor; Sollefteå GIF; IFK Östersund; IK City; IFK Sunne; Hallstahammars SK; Husqvarna IF; Huskvarna Södra IF; Fässbergs IF; IF Saab; Gunnarstorps IF; Hässleholms IF

Statistics of Swedish football Division 2 for the 1961 season.

== League standings ==
=== Norrland ===
Pos	Team	Pld	W	D	L	GF	GA	GD	Pts	Qualification or relegation
1	GIF Sundsvall	18	11	4	3	45	21	+24	26	Playoffs for promotion to Allsvenskan
2	IFK Holmsund	18	11	4	3	39	19	+20	26	
3	Skellefteå AIK	18	11	1	6	48	32	+16	23	
4	Bodens BK	18	7	5	6	35	27	+8	19	
5	Lycksele IF	18	7	4	7	30	28	+2	18	
6	IFK Luleå	18	7	4	7	38	38	0	18	
7	IFK Kalix	18	7	3	8	26	32	−6	17	
8	IF Friska Viljor	18	7	2	9	33	33	0	16	Relegation to Division 3
9	Sollefteå GIF	18	4	1	13	21	64	−43	9	Relegation to Division 3
10	IFK Östersund	18	3	2	13	29	50	−21	8	Relegation to Division 3

=== Svealand ===
Pos	Team	Pld	W	D	L	GF	GA	GD	Pts	Qualification or relegation
1	Djurgårdens IF	22	17	2	3	77	21	+56	36	Playoffs for promotion to Allsvenskan
2	IFK Stockholm	22	17	2	3	65	18	+47	36	
3	Sundbybergs IK	22	13	3	6	63	41	+22	29	
4	Karlstads BIK	22	12	1	9	40	42	−2	25	
5	IFK Eskilstuna	22	11	2	9	52	48	+4	24	
6	Avesta AIK	22	9	4	9	35	38	−3	22	
7	IK Brage	22	9	2	11	34	38	−4	20	
8	Köpings IS	22	6	5	11	21	53	−32	17	
9	SK Sifhälla	22	6	4	12	29	39	−10	16	
10	IK City	22	5	6	11	32	49	−17	16	Relegation to Division 3
11	IFK Sunne	22	5	3	14	36	70	−34	13	Relegation to Division 3
12	Hallstahammars SK	22	4	2	16	18	45	−27	10	Relegation to Division 3

=== Västra Götaland ===
Pos	Team	Pld	W	D	L	GF	GA	GD	Pts	Qualification
1	Östers IF	22	17	4	1	62	31	+31	38	Playoffs for promotion to Allsvenskan
2	IS Halmia	22	15	3	4	63	30	+33	33	
3	Jönköpings Södra IF	22	14	1	7	48	27	+21	29	
4	Norrby IF	22	13	3	6	56	41	+15	29	
5	GAIS	22	11	2	9	37	27	+10	24	
6	IK Oddevold	22	12	0	10	47	50	−3	24	
7	Halmstads BK	22	8	4	10	46	38	+8	20	
8	Kungshamns IF	22	8	2	12	34	57	−23	18	
9	Billingsfors IK	22	6	5	11	43	48	−5	17	
10	Husqvarna IF	22	6	4	12	40	45	−5	16	Relegation to Division 3
11	Huskvarna Södra IF	22	4	2	16	30	63	−33	10	Relegation to Division 3
12	Fässbergs IF	22	3	0	19	26	75	−49	6	Relegation to Division 3

=== Östra Götaland ===
Pos	Team	Pld	W	D	L	GF	GA	GD	Pts	Qualification
1	Högadals IS	22	14	5	3	54	20	+34	33	Playoffs for promotion to Allsvenskan
2	IFK Kristianstad	22	11	9	2	72	36	+36	31	
3	Malmö BI	22	13	5	4	48	25	+23	31	
4	Landskrona BoIS	22	11	6	5	50	30	+20	28	
5	BK Derby	22	9	5	8	44	35	+9	23	
6	Råå IF	22	8	7	7	38	32	+6	23	
7	Motala AIF	22	9	2	11	43	47	−4	20	
8	Kalmar FF	22	7	5	10	41	51	−10	19	
9	Åtvidabergs FF	22	5	6	11	34	52	−18	16	
10	IF Saab	22	4	7	11	32	45	−13	15	Relegation to Division 3
11	Gunnarstorps IF	22	5	5	12	33	68	−35	15	Relegation to Division 3
12	Hässleholms IF	22	4	2	16	23	71	−48	10	Relegation to Division 3

== Allsvenskan promotion playoffs ==
Pos	Team	Pld	W	D	L	GF	GA	GD	Pts	Promotion
1	Djurgårdens IF (C)	3	3	0	0	10	4	+6	6	Promotion to Allsvenskan
2	Högadal	3	2	0	1	12	7	+5	4	Promotion to Allsvenskan
3	GIF Sundsvall	3	0	1	2	5	9	−4	1	
4	Östers IF	3	0	1	2	2	9	−7	1	

Rules for classification: 1) points; 2) goal difference; 3) number of goals scored.
(C) Champions
