= 1947–48 Division 3 (Swedish football) =

Statistics of Swedish football Division 3 (1947–48 season)

Swedish League Division 3
- Season: 1947–48
- Champions: Sandvikens IF; Sundbybergs IK; Jonsereds IF; Råå IF
- Promoted: 4 teams above
- Relegated: 12 teams

Statistics of Swedish football Division 3 for the 1947–48 season.

== League standings ==
=== Norra 1947–48 ===
Pos	Team	Pld	W	D	L	GF	GA	GD	Pts	Promotion or relegation
1	Sandvikens IF	18	13	2	3	53	20	+33	28	Promoted
2	Avesta AIK	18	12	0	6	50	35	+15	24	
3	IK Brage, Borlänge	18	10	3	5	40	22	+18	23	
4	Falu BS, Falun	18	9	3	6	41	27	+14	21	
5	Brynäs IF, Gävle	18	7	5	6	48	45	+3	19	
6	IF Vesta, Uppsala	18	6	6	6	33	43	−10	18	
7	Ljusne AIK	18	7	3	8	39	44	−5	17	
8	Hallstahammars SK	18	5	3	10	37	44	−7	13	Relegated
9	Iggesunds IK	18	3	3	12	29	60	−31	9	Relegated
10	Strands IF, Hudiksvall	18	3	2	13	18	48	−30	8	Relegated

=== Östra 1947–48 ===
Pos	Team	Pld	W	D	L	GF	GA	GD	Pts	Promotion or relegation
1	Sundbybergs IK	18	12	4	2	45	25	+20	28	Promoted
2	BK Kenty, Linköping	18	11	3	4	49	27	+22	25	
3	BK Derby, Linköping	18	11	1	6	45	35	+10	23	
4	IF Verdandi, Eskilstuna	18	9	5	4	40	31	+9	23	
5	Huskvarna Södra IS	18	7	4	7	43	30	+13	18	
6	IFK Eskilstuna	18	7	4	7	41	37	+4	18	
7	IK City, Eskilstuna	18	7	3	8	44	37	+7	17	
8	Mjölby AIF	18	6	2	10	39	41	−2	14	Relegated
9	IFK Lidingö	18	1	6	11	21	55	−34	8	Relegated
10	Hvetlanda GIF, Vetlanda	18	1	4	13	22	71	−49	6	Relegated

=== Västra 1947–48 ===
Pos	Team	Pld	W	D	L	GF	GA	GD	Pts	Promotion or relegation
1	Jonsereds IF	18	12	3	3	50	22	+28	27	Promoted
2	IFK Trollhättan	18	11	2	5	33	24	+9	24	
3	IF Viken, Åmål	18	9	5	4	38	28	+10	23	
4	Trollhättans IF	18	9	3	6	31	29	+2	21	
5	Norrbygärde IF	18	8	3	7	40	31	+9	19	
6	IK Viking, Hagfors	18	7	3	8	30	29	+1	17	
7	Lundby IF, Göteborg	18	5	6	7	30	34	−4	16	
8	IFK Åmål	18	7	1	10	44	52	−8	15	Relegated
9	Göteborgs FF	18	5	4	9	29	34	−5	14	Relegated
10	IFK Munkfors	18	1	2	15	29	71	−42	4	Relegated

=== Södra 1947–48 ===
Pos	Team	Pld	W	D	L	GF	GA	GD	Pts	Promotion or relegation
1	Råå IF	18	16	0	2	83	25	+58	32	Promoted
2	Lunds BK	18	13	3	2	67	26	+41	29	
3	IFK Värnamo	18	11	4	3	49	25	+24	26	
4	Kalmar AIK	18	10	1	7	46	34	+12	21	
5	Falkenbergs FF	18	5	5	8	32	38	−6	15	
6	Ronneby BK	18	6	2	10	34	51	−17	14	
7	Olofströms IF	18	5	4	9	31	60	−29	14	
8	Nybro IF	18	4	3	11	32	64	−32	11	Relegated
9	Malmö BI	18	3	4	11	33	58	−25	10	Relegated
10	Bromölla IF	18	3	2	13	26	52	−26	8	Relegated
