= 1928–29 Division 3 (Swedish football) =

Swedish League Division 3
- Season: 1928–29
- Champions: Sandvikens AIK; Södertälje SK; Köpings IS; IFK Kumla; BK Derby; Kalmar AIK; Majornas IK; IFK Kristianstad
- Promoted: Sandvikens AIK; Köpings IS; BK Derby; IFK Kristianstad
- Relegated: 11 teams

Statistics of Swedish football Division 3 for the 1928–29 season.

== League standings ==
=== Uppsvenska 1928–29 ===
Pos	Team	Pld	W	D	L	GF	GA	GD	Pts	Promotion or relegation
1	Sandvikens AIK	20	18	0	2	101	40	+61	36	Promotion Playoffs – Promoted
2	IK Brage, Borlänge	20	16	2	2	69	21	+48	34	
3	Skärgårdens IF, Sandarne	20	11	4	5	66	42	+24	26	
4	Ljusne AIK	20	7	6	7	51	47	+4	20	
5	Brynäs IF, Gävle	20	9	1	10	68	54	+14	19	
6	Kvarnsvedens GIF	20	8	3	9	54	47	+7	19	
7	Skutskärs IF	20	8	2	10	59	56	+3	18	
8	Avesta IF	20	8	2	10	37	56	−19	18	
9	Grycksbo IF	20	7	3	10	25	54	−29	17	
10	Ludvika FFI	20	3	3	14	36	80	−44	9	Relegated
11	Falu SK, Falun	20	1	2	17	22	91	−69	4	Relegated

=== Östsvenska 1928–29 ===
Pos	Team	Pld	W	D	L	GF	GA	GD	Pts	Qualification or relegation
1	Södertälje SK	18	11	4	3	48	28	+20	26	Promotion Playoffs
2	IF Olympia, Stockholm	18	11	2	5	45	31	+14	24	
3	Reymersholms IK, Stockholm	18	11	2	5	40	29	+11	24	
4	IF Norden, Sala	18	10	4	4	45	29	+16	24	
5	Huvudsta IS, Solna	18	9	3	6	49	31	+18	21	
6	Uppsala IF	18	8	3	7	37	34	+3	19	
7	Enköpings SK	18	5	3	10	29	39	−10	13	
8	IK Sirius, Uppsala	18	5	2	11	30	43	−13	12	
9	IF Vesta, Uppsala	18	3	3	12	29	60	−31	9	Relegated
10	IF Linnea, Stockholm	18	3	2	13	17	45	−28	8	Relegated

=== Mellansvenska 1928–29 ===
Pos	Team	Pld	W	D	L	GF	GA	GD	Pts	Promotion or relegation
1	Köpings IS	18	15	2	1	53	13	+40	32	Promotion Playoffs – Promoted
2	Fagersta AIK	18	12	3	3	52	24	+28	27	
3	Örebro SK	18	10	3	5	47	25	+22	23	
4	Katrineholms SK	18	7	3	8	36	35	+1	17	
5	Kolsva IF	18	6	4	8	45	57	−12	16	
6	Tunafors SK, Eskilstuna	18	5	4	9	38	46	−8	14	
7	IFK Lindesberg	18	6	2	10	49	61	−12	14	
8	Västerås IK	18	5	3	10	31	44	−13	13	
9	IFK Arboga	18	4	5	9	26	47	−21	13	Relegated
10	Katrineholms AIK	18	4	3	11	25	50	−25	11	Relegated

=== Nordvästra 1928–29 ===
Pos	Team	Pld	W	D	L	GF	GA	GD	Pts	Qualification or relegation
1	IFK Kumla	18	14	2	2	74	26	+48	30	Promotion Playoffs
2	Örebro IK	18	10	5	3	48	29	+19	25	
3	IFK Örebro	18	11	1	6	58	46	+12	23	
4	Mariehofs IF, Karlstad	18	9	4	5	50	40	+10	22	
5	Karlstads BK	18	9	2	7	37	32	+5	20	
6	Karlskoga IF	18	7	1	10	36	32	+4	15	
7	IFK Kristinehamn	18	6	3	9	30	48	−18	15	
8	Degerfors IF	18	5	3	10	46	49	−3	13	
9	Jannelunds SK	18	4	3	11	32	51	−19	11	Relegated
10	IFK Hallsberg	18	1	4	13	21	79	−58	6	Relegated

=== Södra Mellansvenska 1928–29 ===
Pos	Team	Pld	W	D	L	GF	GA	GD	Pts	Promotion or relegation
1	BK Derby, Linköping	18	13	3	2	65	28	+37	29	Promotion Playoffs – Promoted
2	Motala AIF	18	10	6	2	42	16	+26	26	
3	Mjölby AIF	18	11	3	4	29	22	+7	25	
4	Jönköpings IS	18	7	4	7	42	30	+12	18	
5	Boxholms IF	18	7	4	7	31	38	−7	18	
6	Tranås AIF	18	8	1	9	29	42	−13	17	
7	Huskvarna IF	18	6	3	9	31	29	+2	15	
8	Linköpings AIK	18	5	1	12	25	43	−18	11	
9	IFK Oskarshamn	18	3	5	10	25	46	−21	11	
10	Västerviks AIS	18	4	2	12	32	57	−25	10	

=== Sydöstra 1928–29 ===
Pos	Team	Pld	W	D	L	GF	GA	GD	Pts	Qualification
1	Kalmar AIK	14	10	1	3	36	17	+19	21	Promotion Playoffs
2	IFK Karlskrona	14	8	4	2	32	17	+15	20	
3	IFK Karlshamn	14	9	0	5	33	19	+14	18	
4	Älmhults IF	14	6	1	7	35	37	−2	13	
5	Karlskrona BK	14	5	2	7	34	35	−1	12	
6	Nybro IF	14	5	2	7	24	34	−10	12	
7	Hovmantorps GIF	14	5	1	8	25	36	−11	11	
8	Växjö BK	14	2	1	11	25	49	−24	5	

=== Västsvenska 1928–29 ===
Pos	Team	Pld	W	D	L	GF	GA	GD	Pts	Qualification or relegation
1	Majornas IK, Göteborg	18	11	2	5	60	37	+23	24	Promotion Playoffs
2	Vänersborgs IF	18	11	1	6	46	38	+8	23	
3	IFK Borås	18	9	3	6	36	35	+1	21	
4	Landala IF, Göteborg	18	8	4	6	33	25	+8	20	
5	Uddevalla IS	18	8	3	7	35	28	+7	19	
6	IF Welox, Göteborg	18	6	5	7	38	32	+6	17	
7	IFK Trollhättan	18	7	2	9	42	47	−5	16	
8	Trollhättans IF	18	6	3	9	33	43	−10	15	
9	IF Heimer, Lidköping	18	6	1	11	35	52	−17	13	Relegated
10	Skara IF	18	5	2	11	22	43	−21	12	Relegated

=== Sydsvenska 1928–29 ===
Pos	Team	Pld	W	D	L	GF	GA	GD	Pts	Promotion or relegation
1	IFK Kristianstad	18	11	2	5	57	27	+30	24	Promotion Playoffs – Promoted
2	IFK Trelleborg	18	10	3	5	38	27	+11	23	
3	Höganäs BK	18	10	3	5	43	33	+10	23	
4	Malmö BIF	18	10	1	7	55	27	+28	21	
5	Landskrona IF	18	9	1	8	51	47	+4	19	
6	Halmstads AIS	18	6	4	8	23	36	−13	16	Withdrew – Relegated
7	Varbergs GIF	18	5	5	8	36	34	+2	15	
8	Falkenbergs FF	18	7	1	10	29	53	−24	15	
9	Varbergs BoIS	18	4	5	9	24	43	−19	13	
10	IFK Hälsingborg	18	4	3	11	30	59	−29	11	
