= 1929–30 Division 3 (Swedish football) =

Swedish League Division 3
- Season: 1929–30
- Champions: IK Brage; Djurgårdens IF; Örebro SK; Mariehofs IF; Motala AIF; Kalmar AIK; Landala IF; BK Drott
- Promoted: IK Brage; Mariehofs IF; Kalmar AIK; BK Drott
- Relegated: 14 teams

Statistics of Swedish football Division 3 for the 1929–30 season.

== League standings ==
=== Uppsvenska 1929–30 ===
Pos	Team	Pld	W	D	L	GF	GA	GD	Pts	Promotion or relegation
1	IK Brage, Borlänge	16	15	1	0	80	15	+65	31	Promotion Playoffs – Promoted
2	Skutskärs IF	16	7	4	5	44	36	+8	18	
3	Kvarnsvedens GIF	16	6	6	4	42	42	0	18	
4	Brynäs IF, Gävle	16	8	2	6	47	49	−2	18	
5	Skärgårdens IF, Sandarne	16	8	1	7	40	37	+3	17	
6	Ljusne AIK	16	7	1	8	43	40	+3	15	
7	IFK Hedemora	16	4	3	9	30	50	−20	11	
8	Avesta IF	16	5	1	10	32	54	−22	11	Relegated
9	Grycksbo IF	16	2	1	13	20	55	−35	5	Relegated

=== Östsvenska 1929–30 ===
Pos	Team	Pld	W	D	L	GF	GA	GD	Pts	Qualification or relegation
1	Djurgårdens IF, Stockholm	22	15	4	3	74	28	+46	34	Promotion Playoffs
2	Reymersholms IK, Stockholm	22	13	4	5	57	35	+22	30	
3	IF Norden, Sala	22	13	4	5	52	35	+17	30	
4	IFK Stockholm	22	11	5	6	60	31	+29	27	
5	Södertälje SK	22	9	5	8	35	40	−5	23	
6	Nyköpings BK	22	10	2	10	69	45	+24	22	
7	Huvudsta IS, Solna	22	9	3	10	43	38	+5	21	
8	Enköpings SK	22	9	3	10	45	69	−24	21	
9	Kronobergs IK, Stockholm	22	9	2	11	57	49	+8	20	
10	IF Olympia, Stockholm	22	7	1	14	23	68	−45	15	Relegated
11	Uppsala IF	22	5	1	16	44	78	−34	11	Relegated
12	IK Sirius, Uppsala	22	4	2	16	26	69	−43	10	Relegated

=== Mellansvenska 1929–30 ===
Pos	Team	Pld	W	D	L	GF	GA	GD	Pts	Qualification or relegation
1	Örebro SK	20	14	4	2	50	23	+27	32	Promotion Playoffs
2	IFK Kumla	20	13	4	3	67	24	+43	30	
3	Katrineholms SK	20	10	3	7	57	37	+20	23	
4	Örebro IK	20	8	5	7	68	57	+11	21	
5	IF Rune, Kungsör	20	7	5	8	41	46	−5	19	
6	Tunafors SK, Eskilstuna	20	7	5	8	43	51	−8	19	
7	IFK Örebro	20	8	2	10	46	52	−6	18	
8	Kolsva IF	20	7	4	9	33	40	−7	18	
9	Fagersta AIK	20	8	2	10	32	47	−15	18	
10	IFK Lindesberg	20	7	3	10	41	46	−5	17	Relegated
11	Västerås IK	20	2	1	17	22	77	−55	5	Relegated

=== Nordvästra 1929–30 ===
Pos	Team	Pld	W	D	L	GF	GA	GD	Pts	Promotion or relegation
1	Mariehofs IF, Karlstad	14	7	5	2	27	23	+4	19	Promotion Playoffs – Promoted
2	IFK Åmål	14	7	3	4	27	19	+8	17	
3	Karlskoga IF	14	5	5	4	30	28	+2	15	
4	Karlstads BK	14	6	2	6	28	25	+3	14	
5	Degerfors IF	14	5	3	6	34	27	+7	13	
6	IF Viken, Åmål	14	4	5	5	21	29	−8	13	
7	Slottsbrons IF	14	4	3	7	26	34	−8	11	
8	IFK Kristinehamn	14	3	4	7	17	25	−8	10	Relegated

=== Södra Mellansvenska 1929–30 ===
Pos	Team	Pld	W	D	L	GF	GA	GD	Pts	Qualification or relegation
1	Motala AIF	20	13	4	3	58	25	+33	30	Promotion Playoffs
2	Mjölby AIF	20	13	1	6	56	36	+20	27	
3	Huskvarna IF	20	12	2	6	38	31	+7	26	
4	Boxholms IF	20	10	4	6	52	40	+12	24	
5	IK Tord, Jönköping	20	11	1	8	54	45	+9	23	
6	IFK Oskarshamn	20	8	3	9	37	42	−5	19	
7	Västerviks AIS	20	8	3	9	29	34	−5	19	
8	Tranås AIF	20	6	4	10	32	40	−8	16	
9	Norrköpings SK	20	7	1	12	47	54	−7	15	
10	Linköpings AIK	20	3	8	9	22	42	−20	14	Relegated
11	Jönköpings IS	20	2	3	15	24	60	−36	7	Relegated

=== Sydöstra 1929–30 ===
Pos	Team	Pld	W	D	L	GF	GA	GD	Pts	Promotion or relegation
1	Kalmar AIK	16	13	1	2	59	17	+42	27	Promotion Playoffs – Promoted
2	IFK Karlskrona	16	11	2	3	52	34	+18	24	
3	IFK Karlshamn	16	9	3	4	50	40	+10	21	
4	Hovmanstorps GIF	16	7	2	7	29	27	+2	16	
5	Lessebo GIF	16	6	2	8	39	44	−5	14	
6	Nybro IF	16	5	2	9	25	44	−19	12	
7	Älmhults IF	16	4	3	9	35	38	−3	11	
8	Växjö BK	16	5	1	10	31	39	−8	11	
9	Karlskrona BK	16	4	0	12	24	61	−37	8	Relegated

=== Västsvenska 1929–30 ===
Pos	Team	Pld	W	D	L	GF	GA	GD	Pts	Qualification or relegation
1	Landala IF, Göteborg	22	14	6	2	57	22	+35	34	Promotion Playoffs
2	Lundby IF, Göteborg	22	12	5	5	56	30	+26	29	
3	Trollhättans IF	22	10	7	5	42	38	+4	27	
4	IFK Trollhättan	22	10	4	8	40	34	+6	24	
5	Jonsereds IF	22	8	7	7	43	34	+9	23	
6	IFK Borås	22	9	5	8	46	45	+1	23	
7	Uddevalla IS	22	8	5	9	51	48	+3	21	
8	Surte IS	22	9	1	12	31	39	−8	19	
9	IF Welox, Göteborg	22	8	3	11	31	46	−15	19	
10	Majornas IK, Göteborg	22	7	4	11	40	47	−7	18	
11	Billingsfors IK	22	6	2	14	27	64	−37	14	Relegated
12	Vänersborgs IF	22	5	3	14	28	45	−17	13	Relegated

=== Sydsvenska 1929–30 ===
Pos	Team	Pld	W	D	L	GF	GA	GD	Pts	Promotion or relegation
1	BK Drott, Hälsingborg	18	13	1	4	53	24	+29	27	Promotion Playoffs – Promoted
2	Lunds BK	18	11	3	4	53	35	+18	25	
3	Höganäs BK	18	9	5	4	47	28	+19	23	
4	Varbergs GIF	18	10	2	6	43	37	+6	22	
5	Malmö BIF	18	8	3	7	28	32	−4	19	
6	Varbergs BoIS	18	7	3	8	37	29	+8	17	
7	IFK Hälsingborg	18	6	2	10	38	39	−1	14	
8	IFK Trelleborg	18	4	4	10	25	38	−13	12	
9	Falkenbergs FF	18	5	1	12	17	37	−20	11	
10	Landskrona IF	18	4	2	12	23	65	−42	10	Relegated
