= 1949–50 Division 3 (Swedish football) =

Swedish League Division 3
- Season: 1949–50
- Champions: Sandvikens IF; Hammarby IF; Norrby IF; Lunds BK
- Promoted: 4 teams above
- Relegated: 12 teams

Statistics of Swedish football Division 3 for the 1949–50 season.

== League standings ==
=== Norra 1949–50 ===
Pos	Team	Pld	W	D	L	GF	GA	GD	Pts	Promotion or relegation
1	Sandvikens IF	18	14	1	3	68	18	+50	29	Promoted
2	Fagerviks GF	18	12	3	3	46	18	+28	27	
3	Ludvika FFI	18	12	2	4	49	18	+31	26	
4	Hofors AIF	18	8	4	6	39	30	+9	20	
5	IF Vesta, Uppsala	18	9	1	8	30	36	−6	19	
6	IFK Östersund	18	8	2	8	36	31	+5	18	
7	Falu BS, Falun	18	5	5	8	27	34	−7	15	
8	IK Sirius, Uppsala	18	4	2	12	21	57	−36	10	Relegated
9	Skutskärs IF	18	3	2	13	21	55	−34	8	Relegated
10	Brynäs IF, Gävle	18	2	4	12	19	59	−40	8	Relegated

=== Östra 1949–50 ===
Pos	Team	Pld	W	D	L	GF	GA	GD	Pts	Promotion or relegation
1	Hammarby IF, Stockholm	18	12	1	5	58	32	+26	25	Promoted
2	Hagalunds IS, Solna	18	10	3	5	39	25	+14	23	
3	BK Kenty, Linköping	18	9	4	5	42	34	+8	22	
4	Västerås SK	18	7	7	4	40	25	+15	21	
5	Husqvarna IF	18	7	3	8	34	44	−10	17	
6	BK Hird, Norrköping	18	6	4	8	30	33	−3	16	
7	IFK Eskilstuna	18	5	6	7	29	32	−3	16	
8	IFK Kumla	18	7	1	10	34	48	−14	15	Relegated
9	Västerås IK	18	5	4	9	28	46	−18	14	Relegated
10	IF Verdandi, Eskilstuna	18	3	5	10	30	45	−15	11	Relegated

=== Västra 1949–50 ===
Pos	Team	Pld	W	D	L	GF	GA	GD	Pts	Promotion or relegation
1	Norrby IF, Borås	18	14	3	1	67	14	+53	31	Promoted
2	IFK Åmål	18	9	4	5	38	29	+9	22	
3	Tidaholms GIF	18	8	5	5	38	25	+13	21	
4	IFK Trollhättan	18	10	1	7	40	31	+9	21	
5	Krokslätts FF, Mölndal	18	8	3	7	38	35	+3	19	
6	Lindholmens BK, Göteborg	18	7	3	8	30	34	−4	17	
7	IFK Tidaholm	18	6	3	9	34	46	−12	15	
8	Trollhättans IF	18	6	1	11	22	37	−15	13	Relegated
9	Billingsfors IK	18	5	1	12	24	61	−37	11	Relegated
10	Lundby IF, Göteborg	18	3	4	11	18	37	−19	10	Relegated

=== Södra 1949–50 ===
Pos	Team	Pld	W	D	L	GF	GA	GD	Pts	Promotion or relegation
1	Lunds BK	18	12	3	3	53	27	+26	27	Promoted
2	Alets IK	18	9	5	4	31	26	+5	23	
3	Kalmar AIK	18	9	2	7	47	27	+20	20	
4	BK Drott, Hälsingborg	18	7	4	7	38	42	−4	18	
5	IFK Värnamo	18	8	2	8	40	46	−6	18	
6	Skene IF	18	7	3	8	29	37	−8	17	
7	Nybro IF	18	8	0	10	41	29	+12	16	
8	Hälsingborgs BIS	18	5	5	8	24	33	−9	15	Relegated
9	Falkenbergs FF	18	5	4	9	24	40	−16	14	Relegated
10	Oskarshamns AIK	18	5	2	11	34	54	−20	12	Relegated
