= 1932–33 Division 3 (Swedish football) =

Swedish League Division 3
- Season: 1932–33
- Champions: Ljusne AIK; Sundbybergs IK; Örebro SK; IFK Örebro; Huskvarna IF; Lessebo GIF; Gårda BK; IFK Hälsingborg
- Promoted: 8 teams above
- Relegated: 16 teams

Statistics of Swedish football Division 3 for the 1932–33 season.

== League standings ==
=== Uppsvenska 1932–33 ===
Pos	Team	Pld	W	D	L	GF	GA	GD	Pts	Promotion or relegation
1	Ljusne AIK	18	11	5	2	32	13	+19	27	Promoted
2	Skärgårdens IF, Sandarne	18	12	2	4	52	31	+21	26	
3	Söderhamns IF	18	8	5	5	31	20	+11	21	
4	Bollnäs GIF	18	9	3	6	36	37	−1	21	
5	Ala IF	18	5	6	7	33	33	0	16	
6	Kvarnsvedens GIF	18	5	6	7	34	35	−1	16	Withdrew
7	Söderfors GIF	18	5	6	7	27	38	−11	16	
8	Skutskärs IF	18	6	4	8	19	30	−11	16	
9	IFK Hedemora	18	4	4	10	27	38	−11	12	Relegated
10	Valbo IF	18	3	3	12	18	34	−16	9	Relegated

=== Östsvenska 1932–33 ===
Pos	Team	Pld	W	D	L	GF	GA	GD	Pts	Promotion or relegation
1	Sundbybergs IK	18	10	5	3	49	28	+21	25	Promoted
2	Enköpings SK	18	11	0	7	51	36	+15	22	
3	Årsta SK, Stockholm	18	8	6	4	45	33	+12	22	
4	Nyköpings BK	18	8	3	7	33	45	−12	19	
5	Hagalunds IS, Solna	18	6	6	6	34	44	−10	18	
6	Enskede IK	18	6	5	7	38	34	+4	17	
7	IFK Stockholm	18	7	2	9	40	36	+4	16	
8	Uppsala IF	18	6	4	8	48	51	−3	16	
9	Värtans IK, Stockholm	18	6	3	9	37	46	−9	15	Relegated
10	Stockholms IF	18	3	4	11	22	44	−22	10	Relegated

=== Mellansvenska 1932–33 ===
Pos	Team	Pld	W	D	L	GF	GA	GD	Pts	Promotion or relegation
1	Örebro SK	18	13	2	3	53	27	+26	28	Promoted
2	IFK Arboga	18	9	7	2	43	29	+14	25	
3	Katrineholms SK	18	11	1	6	64	38	+26	23	
4	IFK Lindesberg	18	9	5	4	54	40	+14	23	
5	IF Rune, Kungsör	18	8	3	7	42	36	+6	19	
6	Fagersta AIK	18	7	5	6	34	31	+3	19	
7	IF Verdandi, Eskilstuna	18	7	4	7	56	41	+15	18	
8	Västerås SK	18	5	4	9	29	47	−18	14	
9	Flens IF	18	2	3	13	25	74	−49	7	Relegated
10	Tunafors SK, Eskilstuna	18	2	0	16	26	63	−37	4	Relegated

=== Nordvästra 1932–33 ===
Pos	Team	Pld	W	D	L	GF	GA	GD	Pts	Promotion or relegation
1	IFK Örebro	18	12	3	3	67	32	+35	27	Promoted
2	Arvika BK	18	10	4	4	46	36	+10	24	
3	Karlstads BK	18	10	3	5	52	30	+22	23	
4	IFK Kristinehamn	18	11	1	6	45	27	+18	23	
5	Almby IK	18	8	2	8	36	40	−4	18	
6	Mariehofs IF, Karlstad	18	6	3	9	36	32	+4	15	
7	Jannelunds SK	18	6	3	9	32	46	−14	15	
8	IFK Åmål	18	5	4	9	39	49	−10	14	
9	IF Viken, Åmål	18	4	3	11	22	53	−31	11	Relegated
10	Forshaga IF	18	4	2	12	26	56	−30	10	Relegated

=== Södra Mellansvenska 1932–33 ===
Pos	Team	Pld	W	D	L	GF	GA	GD	Pts	Promotion or relegation
1	Huskvarna IF	18	11	4	3	38	23	+15	26	Promoted
2	IK Tord, Jönköping	18	11	4	3	52	35	+17	26	
3	Hvetlanda GIF, Vetlanda	18	10	3	5	42	37	+5	23	
4	Finspångs IK	18	8	4	6	34	33	+1	20	
5	IF Sylvia, Norrköping	18	7	2	9	29	38	−9	16	
6	Boxholms IF	18	6	3	9	40	35	+5	15	
7	Tranås AIF	18	6	3	9	38	39	−1	15	
8	IFK Oskarshamn	18	6	3	9	32	33	−1	15	
9	Vaggeryds IK	18	6	3	9	42	47	−5	15	Relegated
10	Finspångs AIF	18	3	3	12	33	60	−27	9	Relegated

=== Sydöstra 1932–33 ===
Pos	Team	Pld	W	D	L	GF	GA	GD	Pts	Promotion or relegation
1	Lessebo GIF	18	12	2	4	37	25	+12	26	Promoted
2	IFK Värnamo	18	10	3	5	43	33	+10	23	
3	Hovmantorps GIF	18	9	4	5	49	43	+6	22	
4	IFK Karlskrona	18	10	1	7	46	40	+6	21	
5	Karlskrona BK	18	8	3	7	49	53	−4	19	
6	Växjö BK	18	7	4	7	49	28	+21	18	
7	Nybro IF	18	8	2	8	51	46	+5	18	
8	Älmhults IF	18	6	3	9	34	41	−7	15	
9	Flottans IF, Karlskrona	18	5	0	13	35	58	−23	10	Relegated
10	Emmaboda IS	18	3	2	13	25	51	−26	8	Relegated

=== Västsvenska 1932–33 ===
Pos	Team	Pld	W	D	L	GF	GA	GD	Pts	Promotion or relegation
1	Gårda BK, Göteborg	18	13	1	4	61	35	+26	27	Promoted
2	Trollhättans IF	18	10	1	7	36	33	+3	21	
3	Lundby IF, Göteborg	18	9	2	7	56	39	+17	20	
4	Landala IF	18	10	0	8	40	33	+7	20	
5	Alingsås IF	18	8	1	9	37	44	−7	17	
6	Skara IF	18	7	3	8	46	55	−9	17	
7	Munkedals IF	18	7	2	9	41	39	+2	16	
8	Uddevalla IS	18	7	1	10	42	65	−23	15	
9	Marieholms BIK, Göteborg	18	6	2	10	46	46	0	14	Relegated
10	IF Heimer, Lidköping	18	5	3	10	31	47	−16	13	Relegated

=== Sydsvenska 1932–33 ===
Pos	Team	Pld	W	D	L	GF	GA	GD	Pts	Promotion or relegation
1	IFK Hälsingborg	18	8	6	4	39	33	+6	22	Promoted
2	Varbergs BoIS	18	8	5	5	40	27	+13	21	
3	Varbergs GIF	18	8	4	6	40	35	+5	20	
4	IFK Trelleborg	18	8	4	6	30	30	0	20	
5	Ängelholms IF	18	8	3	7	40	38	+2	19	
6	IFK Kristianstad	18	8	3	7	42	42	0	19	
7	Oskarströms IF	18	7	3	8	36	35	+1	17	
8	Lunds GIF	18	6	3	9	36	40	−4	15	
9	Hälsans BK, Hälsingborg	18	6	3	9	37	42	−5	15	Relegated
10	Falkenbergs FF	18	4	4	10	31	49	−18	12	Relegated
