= Wäija-Dynäs IK =

Swedish sports club

- Full name: Wäija-Dynäs idrottsklubb
- Sport: soccer
- Based in: Väja, Sweden

Wäija-Dynäs IK is a sports club in Väja, Sweden.

The women's soccer team played three seasons in the Swedish top division between 1979 and 1981.
