= Division 3 (Swedish football) =

Swedish Division 3
- Founded: 2006
- Country: Sweden
- Number of clubs: 144 (in twelve groups)
- Level on pyramid: 5
- Promotion to: Division 2
- Relegation to: Division 4

Division 3 is the fifth level in the league system of Swedish football and comprises 144 Swedish football teams. Division 3 had status as the official third level from 1928 to 1986, but was replaced by Division 2 in 1987. It then had status as the official fourth level until 2005, but was replaced once again as Division 1 was recreated in 2006.

== The competition ==
Division 3 consists of 144 clubs, divided into 12 groups of 12 teams, each representing a geographical area. The season runs from April to October, with each club playing the others in its group twice—once at home and once away—for a total of 22 matches. The top team in each group is promoted to Division 2, replacing the two lowest-placed teams from each Division 2 league. The second-placed teams in Division 3 compete in promotion/relegation play-offs against the third-lowest teams in Division 2.

Normally, at the end of each season the three lowest placed teams of each group are relegated to the regional Division 4 and thirty-six teams from the regional Division 4 leagues are promoted in their place while the fourth lowest placed teams in the Division 3 leagues plays promotion/relegation play-offs against teams in Division 4. There were a series of relegation/promotion play-offs at the end of the 2010 season.

== Administration ==
The Swedish Football Association (SvFF) is responsible for the administration of Division 3.

== Current clubs ==
Clubs for the 2026 season:

=== Norra Norrland ===
- Bergnäsets AIK
- Bodens City FC
- Gimonäs Umeå IF
- Hedens IF
- IFK Kalix
- Kiruna FF
- Luleå SK
- Morön BK
- Notvikens IK
- OhtanaPajala FF
- Piteå IF Akademi
- Sunnanå SK

=== Mellersta Norrland ===
- Älgarna-Härnösand IF
- Alnö IF
- Anundsjö IF
- Cosmos FK
- Järpens IF
- Kramfors-Alliansen
- Ope IF
- Selånger SK
- Sollefteå GIF
- Svartviks IF
- Tegs SK
- Ytterhogdals IF

=== Södra Norrland ===
- Åbyggeby FK
- Avesta AIK
- Bollnäs GIF
- Forsbacka IK
- Forssa BK
- Hudiksvalls Förenade FF
- IK Huge
- Ljusdals IF
- IFK Mora
- Näsvikens IK
- Sandvikens AIK
- IK Sätra

=== Norra Svealand ===
- Åkersberga FC
- Fanna FK
- IK Frej Täby
- Gamla Upsala SK
- BKV Norrtälje
- Österåker United FK
- Roslagsbro IF
- Sundbybergs IK
- Unik FK
- IFK Uppsala
- Upsala IF
- Vallentuna BK

=== Södra Svealand ===
- Arameisk-Syrianska IF
- Boo FF
- FC Brandbergen
- Fisksätra IF
- Hanvikens SK
- Huddinge IF
- Norrtulls SK
- Reymersholms IK
- Södertälje FF
- Trosa-Vagnhärad SK
- Tyresö FF
- Vendelsö IK

=== Mellersta Svealand ===
- Adolfsbergs IK
- FK Bosna 92 Örebro
- IFK Eskilstuna
- Forshaga IF
- Hallstahammars SK
- Herzöga BK
- Säffle SK
- IK Sturehov
- Syrianska-Eskilstuna IF
- IF Viken
- Woody's FC
- Yxhults IK

=== Nordvästra Götaland ===
- Assyriska IK
- Egnahems BK
- IFK Falköping
- IK Gauthiod
- IF Haga
- IFK Mariestad
- Melleruds IF
- Syrianska FK Lidköping
- Tidaholms GoIF
- Trollhättans FK
- Vara SK
- Wargöns IK

=== Mellersta Götaland ===
- Alingsås IF
- Assyriska BK
- Bergdalens IK
- Hovås-Billdal IF
- Lunden Överås BK
- Näsets SK
- Öckerö IF
- Sävedalens IF
- Serbiska KIF Sembirija
- IFK Uddevalla
- Västkurd BK
- IK Zenith

=== Nordöstra Götaland ===
- Åby IF
- Assyriska IF Norrköping
- Hemgårdarnas BK
- Hjulsbro IK
- Lindö FF
- BK Ljungsbro
- LSW IF
- Mjölby AI
- Myresjö-Vetlanda FK
- Nässjö FF
- Rimforsa IF
- Torstorps IF

=== Sydvästra Götaland ===
- Åsa IF
- IF Centern
- Derome-Åskloster FF
- Gislaveds IF
- IS Halmia
- Hittarps IK
- Högaborgs BK
- Kinna IF
- Stafsinge IF
- Tölö IF
- Varbergs GIF
- Vejby IF

=== Sydöstra Götaland ===
- Älmhults IF
- Football Primetime FC
- Hanaskogs IS
- Kalmar City BK
- FK Karlshamn United
- Kosta IF
- Kristianopels GIF
- Lindsdals IF
- Ljungby IF
- Pukebergs BK
- Rödeby AIF
- Saxemara IF

=== Södra Götaland ===
- FBK Balkan
- Bosnien Hercegovinas SK
- NK Croatia
- Eslövs BK
- IFK Hässleholm
- Kulladals FF
- IF Limhamn Bunkeflo
- IFK Malmö
- Malmö IK
- Råå IF
- IFK Simrishamn
- Ystads IF

== Seasons ==
=== Third tier ===
- 1928–29
- 1929–30
- 1930–31
- 1931–32
- 1932–33
- 1933–34
- 1934–35
- 1935–36
- 1936–37
- 1937–38
- 1938–39
- 1939–40
- 1940–41
- 1941–42
- 1942–43
- 1943–44
- 1944–45
- 1945–46
- 1946–47
- 1947–48
- 1948–49
- 1949–50
- 1950–51
- 1951–52
- 1952–53
- 1953–54
- 1954–55
- 1955–56
- 1956–57
- 1957–58
- 1959
- 1960
- 1961
- 1962
- 1963
- 1964
- 1965
- 1966
- 1967
- 1968
- 1969
- 1970
- 1971
- 1972
- 1973
- 1974
- 1975
- 1976
- 1977
- 1978
- 1979
- 1980
- 1981
- 1982
- 1983
- 1984
- 1985
- 1986

=== Fourth tier ===
- 1987
- 1988
- 1989
- 1990
- 1991
- 1992
- 1993
- 1994
- 1995
- 1996
- 1997
- 1998
- 1999
- 2000
- 2001
- 2002
- 2003
- 2004
- 2005

=== Fifth tier ===
- 2006
- 2007
- 2008
- 2009
- 2010
- 2011
- 2012
- 2013
- 2014
- 2015
- 2016
- 2017
- 2018
- 2019
- 2020
- 2021
- 2022
- 2023
- 2024
- 2025
- 2026
