= Klippans FF =

Swedish football club

- Full name: Klippans Fotboll Förening
- Founded: 2004
- Ground: Åbyvallen; Klippan; Sweden
- Chairman: Tommy Ahlbäck
- League: Division 4 Skåne Nordvästra
Home colours

Klippans FF is a Swedish football club located in Klippan.

== Background ==
Klippans FF were formed in 2004 following the merger of Klippans Boll och Idrottsförening and Forsby Idrottsförening. Klippans BIF were founded on 8 July 1914 and were based at Åbyvallen. From 1933–34 to 1946–47 they played in Division 3, which at that time was the third tier of Swedish football. Forsby IF were founded on 10 August 1934 and played at Forsby IP.

Klippans FF currently plays in Division 4 Skåne Nordvästra which is the sixth tier of Swedish football. They play their home matches at the Åbyvallen in Klippan.

The club is affiliated to Skånes Fotbollförbund. Klippans FF played in the 2008 Svenska Cupen and beat IFK Klagshamn on penalties in the first round before losing 0–5 at home to Falkenbergs FF in the second round with an attendance of 227 people.

== Season to season ==
In the 12 seasons before the merger Klippans BIF competed in the following divisions:

Season	Level	Division	Section	Position	Movements
1993	Tier 5	Division 4	Skåne Nordvästra	7th	Relegation Playoffs
1994	Tier 5	Division 4	Skåne Nordvästra	8th	
1995	Tier 5	Division 4	Skåne Nordvästra	8th	
1996	Tier 5	Division 4	Skåne Nordvästra	2nd	Promotion Playoffs – Promoted
1997	Tier 4	Division 3	Södra Götaland	3rd	
1998	Tier 4	Division 3	Södra Götaland	8th	
1999	Tier 4	Division 3	Södra Götaland	4th	
2000	Tier 4	Division 3	Södra Götaland	8th	
2001	Tier 4	Division 3	Sydvästra Götaland	12th	Relegated
2002	Tier 5	Division 4	Skåne Norra	6th	
2003	Tier 5	Division 4	Skåne Västra	2nd	Promotion Playoffs – Promoted
2004	Tier 4	Division 3	Södra Götaland	10th	Relegated

Klippans FF have competed in the following divisions to date:

Season	Level	Division	Section	Position	Movements
2005	Tier 5	Division 4	Skåne Västra	9th	Relegation Playoffs – Relegated
2006*	Tier 7	Division 5	Skåne Norra	2nd	Promotion Playoffs – Promoted
2007	Tier 6	Division 4	Skåne Norra	4th	
2008	Tier 6	Division 4	Skåne Norra	5th	
2009	Tier 6	Division 4	Skåne Norra	4th	
2010	Tier 6	Division 4	Skåne Nordvästra	3rd	Promotion Playoffs
2011	Tier 6	Division 4	Skåne Nordvästra	2nd	Promotion Playoffs

* League restructuring in 2006 resulted in a new division being created at Tier 3 and subsequent divisions dropping a level.
