= Sollefteå GIF =

Sports club located in Sollefteå, Sweden

- Full name: Sollefteå Gymnastik och Idrottföreningen
- Founded: 1898
- Ground: Nipvallen; Sollefteå; Sweden
- Capacity: 1,000
- Chairman: Anders Vestin
- Coach: Roger Dannberg
- League: Division 3
- 2015: Division 2 Norrland, 14th (Relegated)
Home colours	Away colours

Sollefteå GIF is a Swedish football club located in Sollefteå.

== Background ==
The club was founded in 1898 catering for a variety of sports. From 1905 the club gradually developed its football section. In the 1953/54 season the club played in Division 2 Norrland for the first time. This achievement was repeated in 1955/56 and 1961. In 2010 the club is again playing in Division 2 Norrland but this now represents fourth tier football in the Swedish football league system.

The club is affiliated to the Ångermanlands Fotbollförbund.

== Season to season ==
Season	Level	Division	Section	Position	Movements
1993	Tier 5	Division 4	Ångermanland	3rd	
1994	Tier 5	Division 4	Ångermanland	2nd	Promotion Playoffs – Promoted
1995	Tier 4	Division 3	Mellersta Norrland	8th	
1996	Tier 4	Division 3	Mellersta Norrland	10th	Relegated
1997	Tier 5	Division 4	Ångermanland	5th	
1998	Tier 5	Division 4	Ångermanland	9th	
1999	Tier 5	Division 4	Ångermanland	2nd	
2000	Tier 5	Division 4	Ångermanland	3rd	
2001	Tier 5	Division 4	Ångermanland	2nd	Promotion Playoffs
2002	Tier 5	Division 4	Ångermanland	2nd	Promotion Playoffs
2003	Tier 5	Division 4	Ångermanland	9th	
2004	Tier 5	Division 4	Ångermanland	4th	
2005	Tier 5	Division 4	Ångermanland	2nd	Promoted
2006*	Tier 5	Division 3	Mellersta Norrland	9th	Relegated
2007	Tier 6	Division 4	Ångermanland	2nd	Promoted
2008	Tier 5	Division 3	Mellersta Norrland	2nd	Promoted
2009	Tier 4	Division 2	Norrland	7th	
2010	Tier 4	Division 2	Norrland	4th	
2011	Tier 4	Division 2	Norrland	10th	Relegation Playoffs

* League restructuring in 2006 resulted in a new division being created at Tier 3 and subsequent divisions dropping a level.

== Attendances ==
In recent seasons Sollefteå GIF have had the following average attendances:

Season	Average attendance	Division / Section	Level
2005	Not available	Div 4 Ångermanland	Tier 5
2006	221	Div 3 Mellersta Norrland	Tier 5
2007	Not available	Div 4 Ångermanland	Tier 6
2008	154	Div 3 Mellersta Norrland	Tier 5
2009	283	Div 2 Norrland	Tier 4
2010	298	Div 2 Norrland	Tier 4

* Attendances are provided in the Publikliga sections of the Svenska Fotbollförbundet website.
