= Ronneby BK =

Swedish football club

- Full name: Ronneby Bollklubb
- Short name: RBK
- Ground: Brunnsvallen; Ronneby; Sweden
- Chairman: Magnus Hindrikson
- Head coach: Mikael Heimfors
- League: Division 3 Sydöstra Götaland
Home colours

Ronneby BK is a Swedish football club located in Ronneby.

== Background ==
Ronneby BK currently advanced to Division 3 Blekinge which is the fifth tier of Swedish football. They play their home matches at the Brunnsvallen in Ronneby.

The club is affiliated to Blekinge Fotbollförbund. Ronneby BK have competed in the Svenska Cupen on 17 occasions.

== Season to season ==
Season	Level	Division	Section	Position	Movements
2006*	Tier 5	Division 3	Sydöstra Götaland	10th	Relegated
2007	Tier 6	Division 4	Blekinge	3rd	
2008	Tier 6	Division 4	Blekinge	9th	
2009	Tier 6	Division 4	Blekinge	8th	
2010	Tier 6	Division 4	Blekinge	3rd	
2011	Tier 6	Division 4	Blekinge	1st	
2012	Tier 5	Division 3	Sydöstra Götaland		

* League restructuring in 2006 resulted in a new division being created at Tier 3 and subsequent divisions dropping a level.
