= Waggeryds IK =

Swedish sports club

- Full name: Vaggeryds idrottsklubb
- Sport: Bandy, association football
- Founded: April 1920
- Based in: Vaggeryd, Sweden
- Ballpark: Vaggeryds multisportarena

Waggeryds IK is a sports club in Vaggeryd, Sweden, established in April 1920. The club runs bandy and association football teams. Anton Lindbergh was chairman for the first 38 years of the club. The men's bandy team played in the Swedish top division in 1942. and 1963–1964. and played in the qualifying rounds for the Swedish top division in 1970.
