= Huskvarna Södra IS =

Sports club in Huskvarna, Sweden

Huskvarna Södra IF
- Full name: Huskvarna Södra idrottssällskap
- Nicknames: H-Södra
- Sport: table tennis, earlier even association football
- Founded: 1930
- Based in: Huskvarna, Sweden
- Ballpark: Hjärttorpsvallen

Huskvarna Södra IS was established in 1930 and is a sports club in Huskvarna, Sweden. The club won the Swedish women's table tennis team championship in 1970 and 1972. The association football team played their home games at Hjärttorpsvallen near Tenhultsvägen. In 1987 the men's association football team merged with Husqvarna IF, leading to the establishment of Husqvarna FF.

The early 1970s saw the dawn of the club scoring women's association football successes., leading to the team playing in the Swedish top division in 1978 and 1979.
