= Ljusdals IF =

Swedish football club

- Full name: Ljusdals Idrottsförening
- Founded: 9 June 1904; 121 years ago
- Ground: Älvvallen, Ljusdal
- Chairman: Lars Brolin
- League: Division 4 Hälsingland
Home colours

Ljusdals Idrottsförening, commonly known as Ljusdals IF, is a sports club in Ljusdal, Sweden, currently only playing football.

== History ==
The club was founded on 9 June 1904 and originally competed in football, athletics, gymnastics and cross-country skiing. The club has also competed in bandy, ski jumping, handball, ice hockey, orienteering and swimming.

The men's football team made it to the Norrland Championship final game in 1950, losing 0–4 to Skellefteå AIK. The team also played four seasons in the Swedish second division between 1968 and 1971.

Ljusdals IF currently plays in Division 4 Hälsingland which is the sixth tier of Swedish football. They play their home matches at the Älvvallen in Ljusdal.

In 2017 the women's football team won Division 1 Northern Svealand. In October 2017, Ljusdals IF defeated Notvikens IK in the qualifying games and qualified for the Swedish second-tier Elitettan for the 2018 season. Ljusdal only managed one season in season in the league before it was relegated.

The club is affiliated to Hälsinglands Fotbollförbund.

== Season to season ==
In their most successful period Ljusdals IF competed in the following divisions:

Season	Level	Division	Section	Position	Movements
1950–51	Tier 3	Division 3	Norra	8th	Relegated
1951–52	Tier 4	Division 4	Hälsingland		Promoted
1952–53	Tier 3	Division 3	Norrländska Södra	7th	
1953–54	Tier 3	Division 3	Södra Norrland	2nd	
1954–55	Tier 3	Division 3	Södra Norrland	5th	
1955–56	Tier 3	Division 3	Södra Norrland	5th	
1956–57	Tier 3	Division 3	Södra Norrland	3rd	
1957–58	Tier 3	Division 3	Södra Norrland	2nd	
1959	Tier 3	Division 3	Södra Norrland	4th	
1960	Tier 3	Division 3	Södra Norrland	5th	
1961	Tier 3	Division 3	Södra Norrland	6th	
1962	Tier 3	Division 3	Södra Norrland	4th	
1963	Tier 3	Division 3	Södra Norrland	8th	
1964	Tier 3	Division 3	Södra Norrland Nedre	5th	
1965	Tier 3	Division 3	Södra Norrland Nedre	2nd	
1966	Tier 3	Division 3	Södra Norrland Nedre	1st	Promotion Playoffs
1967	Tier 3	Division 3	Södra Norrland Nedre	1st	Promoted
1968	Tier 2	Division 2	Norrland	3rd	
1969	Tier 2	Division 2	Norrland	7th	
1970	Tier 2	Division 2	Norrland	9th	
1971	Tier 2	Division 2	Norrland	8th	Relegated
1972	Tier 3	Division 3	Södra Norrland	6th	
1973	Tier 3	Division 3	Södra Norrland	11th	Relegated
1974	Tier 4	Division 4	Hälsingland	5th	
1975	Tier 4	Division 4	Hälsingland	4th	
1976	Tier 4	Division 4	Hälsingland	2nd	
1977	Tier 4	Division 4	Hälsingland	10th	
1978	Tier 4	Division 4	Hälsingland	1st	Promoted
1979	Tier 3	Division 3	Södra Norrland	5th	
1980	Tier 3	Division 3	Södra Norrland	2nd	
1981	Tier 3	Division 3	Södra Norrland	4th	
1982	Tier 3	Division 3	Södra Norrland	4th	
1983	Tier 3	Division 3	Södra Norrland	9th	
1984	Tier 3	Division 3	Södra Norrland	6th	
1985	Tier 3	Division 3	Södra Norrland	10th	Relegated
1986	Tier 4	Division 4	Hälsingland	8th	

In recent seasons Ljusdals IF have competed in the following divisions:

Season	Level	Division	Section	Position	Movements
2006*	Tier 7	Division 5	Hälsingland	10th	
2007	Tier 7	Division 5	Hälsingland	9th	
2008	Tier 7	Division 5	Hälsingland	5th	
2009	Tier 7	Division 5	Hälsingland	1st	Promoted
2010	Tier 6	Division 4	Hälsingland	6th	
2011	Tier 6	Division 4	Hälsingland		

* League restructuring in 2006 resulted in a new division being created at Tier 3 and subsequent divisions dropping a level.
