= Köpings IS =

Swedish sports club

- City: Köping, Sweden
- League: Division 1
- Division: Östra
- Founded: 1910; 115 years ago

Köpings IS (KIS) is a sports club in Köping, Sweden, mostly active with playing bandy, floorball and handball, earlier also soccer. The soccer section merged with Forsby FF in 1990 to form Köpings FF. The club colours are yellow and black. The club was founded in 1910.

The men's bandy team has played several seasons in the Swedish top division.

The club had played in the second-level bandy league in Sweden, Allsvenskan, since the start of the present Allsvenskan in 2007 but was relegated to Division 1 in 2013. The club got promoted to Allsvenskan again for the 2014–15 season.
