= Dalen/Krokslätts FF =

Swedish football club

- Full name: Dalen/Krokslätts Fotbollförening
- Founded: 1985
- Ground: Krokslättsvallen; Mölndal; Sweden
- Chairman: Morten Agerup
- Head coach: Daniel Dewerud
- Coach: Alexander John Hayes
- League: Division 4 Göteborg B
Home colours	Away colours

Dalen/Krokslätts FF is a Swedish football club located in Mölndal.

== Background ==
Dalen/Krokslätts Fotbollsförening is a football club from the district of Krokslätt in Gothenburg. The club played under the name Krokslätts FF and for eight seasons competed in the second highest Swedish league. Their greatest success was in the 1932/33 season when they won the Division Two West and qualified for the promotion playoffs for the Allsvenskan. In the play-offs they met Halmstads BK but lost both matches, going down 0–4 on aggregate. [1] The club has also played seventeen seasons in the third highest division.

Dalen/Krokslätts FF currently plays in Division 4 Göteborg B which is the sixth tier of Swedish football. They play their home matches at the Krokslättsvallen in Mölndal.

The club is affiliated to Göteborgs Fotbollförbund. Dalen/Krokslätts FF played in the 2006 Svenska Cupen but lost 1–2 at home to Tenhults IF in the first round. This is the only time that they have competed in the Svenska Cupen.

== Season to season ==
In their most successful period Krokslätts FF competed in the following divisions:

Season	Level	Division	Section	Position	Movements
1925–26	Tier 2	Division 2	Västsvenska	5th	
1926–27	Tier 2	Division 2	Västsvenska	4th	
1927–28	Tier 2	Division 2	Västsvenska	5th	
1928–29	Tier 2	Division 2	Södra	8th	
1929–30	Tier 2	Division 2	Södra	9th	Relegated
1930–31	Tier 3	Division 3	Västsvenska	1st	Promotion Playoffs
1931–32	Tier 3	Division 3	Västsvenska	2nd	Promoted
1932–33	Tier 2	Division 2	Västra	1st	Promotion Playoffs
1933–34	Tier 2	Division 2	Västra	10th	Relegated
1934–35	Tier 3	Division 3	Västsvenska Södra	7th	
1935–36	Tier 3	Division 3	Västsvenska Södra	3rd	
1936–37	Tier 3	Division 3	Västsvenska Södra	5th	
1937–38	Tier 3	Division 3	Västsvenska Södra	8th	
1938–39	Tier 3	Division 3	Västsvenska Södra	6th	
1939–40	Tier 3	Division 3	Västsvenska Södra	5th	
1940–41	Tier 3	Division 3	Västsvenska Södra	4th	
1941–42	Tier 3	Division 3	Västsvenska Södra	1st	Promotion Playoffs
1942–43	Tier 3	Division 3	Västsvenska Södra	1st	Promotion Playoffs – Promoted
1943–44	Tier 2	Division 2	Västra	10th	Relegated
1944–45	Tier 3	Division 3	Västsvenska Södra	7th	
1945–46	Tier 3	Division 3	Västsvenska Södra	2nd	
1946–47	Tier 3	Division 3	Västsvenska Södra	6th	Relegated

In recent seasons Dalen/Krokslätts FF have competed in the following divisions:

Season	Level	Division	Section	Position	Movements
2005	Tier 5	Division 4	Göteborg B	11th	Relegated
2006*	Tier 7	Division 5	Göteborg B	2nd	Promoted
2007	Tier 6	Division 4	Göteborg A	1st	Promoted
2008	Tier 5	Division 3	Sydvästra Götaland	6th	
2009	Tier 5	Division 3	Sydvästra Götaland	11th	Relegated
2010	Tier 6	Division 4	Göteborg B	6th	
2011	Tier 6	Division 4	Göteborg B	12th	Relegated

* League restructuring in 2006 resulted in a new division being created at Tier 3 and subsequent divisions dropping a level.
