= IFK Kristinehamn =

Swedish sports club in Kristinehamn

IFK Kristinehamn is a Swedish sports club based in Kristinehamn, Värmland County. The club has sporting sections including football and handball.

== History ==
IFK Kristinehamn was founded on 8 April 1906. Its football section describes itself as the oldest football association in Värmland County.

Over the years, the club's sporting activities have included several disciplines. Ice hockey in Kristinehamn was also historically associated with IFK before the establishment of Kristinehamns Hockey Team in 1974.

== Football ==
IFK Kristinehamn Fotboll is the club's football section. It was founded on 8 April 1906 and is affiliated with the Värmland Football Association and the Swedish Football Association.

The football section primarily focuses on children and youth football, providing opportunities for both girls and boys. The club emphasises player development, teamwork, inclusion and enjoyment of the sport rather than results alone.

The club's stated ambition is to give as many young people as possible the opportunity to play football for as long as possible, regardless of their level of ambition or ability.

== Handball ==
IFK Kristinehamn Handboll is the club's handball section. It organises teams for children, adolescents and adults, including men's and women's teams and recreational handball.

The section organises training sessions and participates in regional and national handball competitions.
