= IFK Trollhättan =

Swedish football club

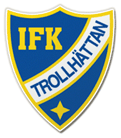
- Full name: Idrottsföreningen Kamraterna Trollhättan
- Founded: 1920
- Ground: Kamratgårdens IP; Trollhättan; Sweden
- Chairman: Leif Mattsson
- Head coach: Issa Daoud
- Coach: Henrik Högström; Kent Löfqvist
- League: Division 3 Nordvästra Götaland
- 2010: Division 3 Nordvästra Götaland, 6th
Home colours

IFK Trollhättan is a Swedish football club located in Trollhättan in Västra Götaland County.

== Background ==
Idrottsföreningen Kamraterna Trollhättan were founded on 15 October 1920. Olle Bengtsson, who later became famous as a boxer, played football earlier in his career, appearing as centre half for IFK Trollhättan.

Since their foundation IFK Trollhättan has participated mainly in the middle divisions of the Swedish football league system. The club currently plays in Division 3 Nordvästra Götaland which is the fifth tier of Swedish football. IFK Trollhättan reached their prime in the 1940s playing 4 seasons in Division 2, which at that time was the second tier of Swedish football. They play their home matches at the Kamratgårdens IP in Trollhättan.

IFK Trollhättan are affiliated to Västergötlands Fotbollförbund.

== Recent history ==
In recent seasons IFK Trollhättan have competed in the following divisions:

2011 – Division III, Nordvästra Götaland
2010 – Division III, Nordvästra Götaland
2009 – Division III, Nordvästra Götaland
2008 – Division IV, Västergötland Västra
2007 – Division III, Mellersta Götaland
2006 – Division IV, Västergötland Västra
2005 – Division III, Nordvästra Götaland
2004 – Division III, Nordvästra Götaland
2003 – Division III, Nordvästra Götaland
2002 – Division IV, Västergötland Västra
2001 – Division IV, Västergötland Västra
2000 – Division IV, Västergötland Västra
1999 – Division III, Mellersta Götaland
1998 – Division III, Nordvästra Götaland
1997 – Division III, Nordvästra Götaland
1996 – Division III, Nordvästra Götaland
1995 – Division III, Nordvästra Götaland
1994 – Division III, Nordvästra Götaland
1993 – Division III, Nordvästra Götaland

== Attendances ==
In recent seasons IFK Trollhättan have had the following average attendances:

Season	Average attendance	Division / Section	Level
2002	Not available	Div 4 Västergötland Västra	Tier 5
2003	149	Div 3 Nordvästra Götaland	Tier 4
2004	171	Div 3 Nordvästra Götaland	Tier 4
2005	85	Div 3 Nordvästra Götaland	Tier 4
2006	Not available	Div 4 Västergötland Västra	Tier 6
2007	106	Div 3 Mellersta Götaland	Tier 5
2008	Not available	Div 4 Västergötland Västra	Tier 6
2009	144	Div 3 Nordvästra Götaland	Tier 5
2010	123	Div 3 Nordvästra Götaland	Tier 5

* Attendances are provided in the Publikliga sections of the Svenska Fotbollförbundet website.
