= 1962 Division 3 (Swedish football) =

Swedish League Division 3
- Season: 1962
- Champions: Norsjö IF; Sandåkerns SK; Bollnäs GIF; Hallstahammars SK; IK City; IFK Sunne; IF Saab; Västra Frölunda IF; Husqvarna IF; Bromölla IF; Kinna IF; Gunnarstorps IF
- Promoted: 12 teams above
- Relegated: 36 teams

Statistics of Swedish football Division 3 for the 1962 season.

== League standings ==
=== Norra Norrland 1962 ===
| Pos | Team | Pld | W | D | L | GF | GA | GD | Pts | Promotion or relegation |
|---|---|---|---|---|---|---|---|---|---|---|
| 1 | Norsjö IF | 16 | 13 | 0 | 3 | 51 | 20 | +31 | 26 | Promoted |
| 2 | Storfors Arbetares IK | 16 | 10 | 5 | 1 | 44 | 21 | +23 | 25 | |
| 3 | Luleå SK | 16 | 8 | 3 | 5 | 44 | 30 | +14 | 19 | |
| 4 | Överkalix IF | 16 | 7 | 4 | 5 | 34 | 26 | +8 | 18 | |
| 5 | Malmbergets AIF | 16 | 8 | 1 | 7 | 42 | 29 | +13 | 17 | |
| 6 | Myckle IK | 16 | 5 | 1 | 10 | 33 | 45 | −12 | 11 | |
| 7 | Haparanda SK-Taktik | 16 | 5 | 1 | 10 | 25 | 48 | −23 | 11 | Relegated |
| 8 | Alterdalens IF | 16 | 5 | 0 | 11 | 27 | 56 | −29 | 10 | Relegated |
| 9 | Ostviks IK | 16 | 3 | 1 | 12 | 26 | 51 | −25 | 7 | Relegated |

=== Mellersta Norrland 1962 ===
| Pos | Team | Pld | W | D | L | GF | GA | GD | Pts | Promotion or relegation |
|---|---|---|---|---|---|---|---|---|---|---|
| 1 | Sandåkerns SK | 18 | 13 | 5 | 0 | 38 | 13 | +25 | 31 | Promoted |
| 2 | IF Älgarna, Hrnsand | 18 | 14 | 2 | 2 | 62 | 24 | +38 | 30 | |
| 3 | Sandviks IK, Holmsund | 18 | 9 | 5 | 4 | 42 | 29 | +13 | 23 | |
| 4 | Köpmanholmens IF | 18 | 7 | 7 | 4 | 34 | 22 | +12 | 21 | |
| 5 | Sollefteå GIF | 18 | 8 | 4 | 6 | 34 | 32 | +2 | 20 | |
| 6 | IF Friska Viljor, Örnsköldsvik | 18 | 5 | 3 | 10 | 31 | 33 | −2 | 13 | |
| 7 | IFK Umeå | 18 | 5 | 2 | 11 | 27 | 40 | −13 | 12 | |
| 8 | Alfredshems IK | 18 | 4 | 3 | 11 | 17 | 32 | −15 | 11 | Relegated |
| 9 | Umeå IK | 18 | 3 | 4 | 11 | 23 | 43 | −20 | 10 | Relegated |
| 10 | Sandslåns SK | 18 | 3 | 3 | 12 | 24 | 64 | −40 | 9 | Relegated |

=== Södra Norrland 1962 ===
| Pos | Team | Pld | W | D | L | GF | GA | GD | Pts | Promotion or relegation |
|---|---|---|---|---|---|---|---|---|---|---|
| 1 | Bollnäs GIF | 22 | 12 | 6 | 4 | 58 | 37 | +21 | 30 | Promoted |
| 2 | IFK Östersund | 22 | 10 | 5 | 7 | 59 | 35 | +24 | 25 | |
| 3 | Edsbyns IF | 22 | 9 | 7 | 6 | 52 | 40 | +12 | 25 | |
| 4 | Ljusdals IF | 22 | 11 | 3 | 8 | 48 | 40 | +8 | 25 | |
| 5 | Marma IF | 22 | 8 | 9 | 5 | 40 | 38 | +2 | 25 | |
| 6 | Kubikenborgs IF, Sundsvall | 22 | 9 | 5 | 8 | 37 | 31 | +6 | 23 | |
| 7 | Wifsta/strands IF, Timrå | 22 | 8 | 6 | 8 | 45 | 46 | −1 | 22 | |
| 8 | Essviks AIF | 22 | 9 | 3 | 10 | 43 | 54 | −11 | 21 | |
| 9 | Sandarne SIF | 22 | 8 | 3 | 11 | 31 | 41 | −10 | 19 | |
| 10 | Ljusne AIK | 22 | 7 | 4 | 11 | 36 | 56 | −20 | 18 | Relegated |
| 11 | Krokom/Dvärstts IF | 22 | 6 | 4 | 12 | 34 | 51 | −17 | 16 | Relegated |
| 12 | Matfors IF | 22 | 5 | 5 | 12 | 30 | 44 | −14 | 15 | Relegated |

=== Norra Svealand 1962 ===
| Pos | Team | Pld | W | D | L | GF | GA | GD | Pts | Promotion or relegation |
|---|---|---|---|---|---|---|---|---|---|---|
| 1 | Hallstahammars SK | 22 | 13 | 5 | 4 | 51 | 20 | +31 | 31 | Promoted |
| 2 | Västerås SK | 22 | 15 | 1 | 6 | 50 | 20 | +30 | 31 | |
| 3 | Hofors AIF | 22 | 12 | 4 | 6 | 35 | 27 | +8 | 28 | |
| 4 | Vansbro AIK | 22 | 11 | 6 | 5 | 45 | 38 | +7 | 28 | |
| 5 | Fagersta AIK | 22 | 11 | 4 | 7 | 39 | 40 | −1 | 26 | |
| 6 | IFK Västerås | 22 | 8 | 6 | 8 | 48 | 40 | +8 | 22 | |
| 7 | Ludvika FFI | 22 | 8 | 6 | 8 | 38 | 35 | +3 | 22 | |
| 8 | Gefle IF, Gävle | 22 | 8 | 5 | 9 | 34 | 37 | −3 | 21 | |
| 9 | IFK Grängesberg | 22 | 8 | 4 | 10 | 37 | 36 | +1 | 20 | Relegated |
| 10 | Skutskärs IF | 22 | 4 | 7 | 11 | 29 | 45 | −16 | 15 | Relegated |
| 11 | Islingby IK, Borlänge | 22 | 3 | 5 | 14 | 19 | 49 | −30 | 11 | Relegated |
| 12 | Högbo AIK, Sandviken | 22 | 4 | 1 | 17 | 29 | 67 | −38 | 9 | |

=== Östra Svealand 1962 ===
| Pos | Team | Pld | W | D | L | GF | GA | GD | Pts | Promotion or relegation |
|---|---|---|---|---|---|---|---|---|---|---|
| 1 | IK City, Eskilstuna | 22 | 14 | 4 | 4 | 51 | 25 | +26 | 32 | Promoted |
| 2 | Råsunda IS, Solna | 22 | 12 | 7 | 3 | 58 | 35 | +23 | 31 | |
| 3 | Hälleforsnäs IF | 22 | 11 | 5 | 6 | 38 | 33 | +5 | 27 | |
| 4 | IK Tellus, Stockholm | 22 | 9 | 5 | 8 | 46 | 42 | +4 | 23 | |
| 5 | Malmköpings IF | 22 | 9 | 3 | 10 | 52 | 41 | +11 | 21 | |
| 6 | Södertälje SK | 22 | 8 | 5 | 9 | 43 | 47 | −4 | 21 | |
| 7 | Enskede IK | 22 | 7 | 7 | 8 | 41 | 45 | −4 | 21 | |
| 8 | Rimbo IF | 22 | 8 | 4 | 10 | 49 | 50 | −1 | 20 | |
| 9 | Reymersholms IK, Stockholm | 22 | 9 | 2 | 11 | 35 | 53 | −18 | 20 | |
| 10 | Hagalunds IS, Solna | 22 | 7 | 5 | 10 | 45 | 52 | −7 | 19 | Relegated |
| 11 | Upsala IF, Uppsala | 22 | 6 | 6 | 10 | 35 | 43 | −8 | 18 | Relegated |
| 12 | Gimo IF | 22 | 3 | 5 | 14 | 26 | 53 | −27 | 11 | Relegated |

=== Västra Svealand 1962 ===
| Pos | Team | Pld | W | D | L | GF | GA | GD | Pts | Promotion or relegation |
|---|---|---|---|---|---|---|---|---|---|---|
| 1 | IFK Sunne | 22 | 17 | 4 | 1 | 80 | 15 | +65 | 38 | Promoted |
| 2 | Fiskeviks IF, Ottebol | 22 | 16 | 3 | 3 | 69 | 28 | +41 | 35 | |
| 3 | Karlstads FF | 22 | 8 | 8 | 6 | 44 | 40 | +4 | 24 | |
| 4 | IFK Arvika | 22 | 6 | 9 | 7 | 40 | 34 | +6 | 21 | |
| 5 | Rynninge IK, Örebro | 22 | 9 | 3 | 10 | 37 | 37 | 0 | 21 | |
| 6 | IFK Bofors | 22 | 9 | 3 | 10 | 41 | 52 | −11 | 21 | |
| 7 | IK Viking, Hagfors | 22 | 7 | 7 | 8 | 35 | 49 | −14 | 21 | |
| 8 | BK Forward, Örebro | 22 | 9 | 2 | 11 | 44 | 41 | +3 | 20 | |
| 9 | Karlskoga IF | 22 | 7 | 6 | 9 | 44 | 43 | +1 | 20 | |
| 10 | IFK Kristinehamn | 22 | 8 | 3 | 11 | 41 | 52 | −11 | 19 | Relegated |
| 11 | Slottsbrons IF | 22 | 7 | 2 | 13 | 40 | 71 | −31 | 16 | Relegated |
| 12 | Vretstorps IF | 22 | 3 | 2 | 17 | 22 | 75 | −53 | 8 | Relegated |

=== Nordöstra Götaland 1962 ===
| Pos | Team | Pld | W | D | L | GF | GA | GD | Pts | Promotion or relegation |
|---|---|---|---|---|---|---|---|---|---|---|
| 1 | IF Saab, Linköping | 22 | 14 | 2 | 6 | 63 | 26 | +37 | 30 | Promoted |
| 2 | Tranås BoIS | 22 | 13 | 4 | 5 | 38 | 23 | +15 | 30 | |
| 3 | Finspångs AIK | 22 | 10 | 4 | 8 | 52 | 47 | +5 | 24 | |
| 4 | Nyköpings AIK | 22 | 9 | 6 | 7 | 42 | 40 | +2 | 24 | |
| 5 | IF Sylvia, Norrköping | 22 | 9 | 5 | 8 | 55 | 45 | +10 | 23 | |
| 6 | IFK Motala | 22 | 10 | 2 | 10 | 47 | 37 | +10 | 22 | |
| 7 | Katrineholms SK | 22 | 7 | 8 | 7 | 25 | 23 | +2 | 22 | |
| 8 | BK Kenty, Linköping | 22 | 8 | 4 | 10 | 37 | 46 | −9 | 20 | |
| 9 | IFK Nykping | 22 | 6 | 7 | 9 | 31 | 45 | −14 | 19 | |
| 10 | Gamleby IF | 22 | 6 | 6 | 10 | 35 | 47 | −12 | 18 | Relegated |
| 11 | Västerviks AIS | 22 | 7 | 2 | 13 | 38 | 60 | −22 | 16 | Relegated |
| 12 | IK Waria, Norrköping | 22 | 6 | 4 | 12 | 25 | 49 | −24 | 16 | Relegated |

=== Nordvästra Götaland 1962 ===
| Pos | Team | Pld | W | D | L | GF | GA | GD | Pts | Promotion or relegation |
|---|---|---|---|---|---|---|---|---|---|---|
| 1 | Västra Frölunda IF | 22 | 18 | 3 | 1 | 81 | 20 | +61 | 39 | Promoted |
| 2 | Skogens IF, Göteborg | 22 | 13 | 2 | 7 | 59 | 42 | +17 | 28 | |
| 3 | BK Häcken, Göteborg | 22 | 13 | 2 | 7 | 56 | 39 | +17 | 28 | |
| 4 | Kullens BK, Göteborg | 22 | 12 | 3 | 7 | 53 | 36 | +17 | 27 | |
| 5 | Vänersborgs IF | 22 | 10 | 4 | 8 | 43 | 42 | +1 | 24 | |
| 6 | Håfreströms IF, Åsensbruk | 22 | 10 | 2 | 10 | 64 | 55 | +9 | 22 | |
| 7 | Göteborgs AIK | 22 | 9 | 3 | 10 | 46 | 41 | +5 | 21 | |
| 8 | Marieholms BIK, Göteborg | 22 | 9 | 1 | 12 | 33 | 61 | −28 | 19 | |
| 9 | IF Viken, Åmål | 22 | 7 | 3 | 12 | 40 | 63 | −23 | 17 | |
| 10 | IFK Trollhättan | 22 | 6 | 2 | 14 | 39 | 65 | −26 | 14 | Relegated |
| 11 | Uddevalla IS | 22 | 4 | 5 | 13 | 32 | 67 | −35 | 13 | Relegated |
| 12 | Trollhättans IF | 22 | 3 | 6 | 13 | 27 | 42 | −15 | 12 | Relegated |

=== Mellersta Götaland 1962 ===
| Pos | Team | Pld | W | D | L | GF | GA | GD | Pts | Promotion or relegation |
|---|---|---|---|---|---|---|---|---|---|---|
| 1 | Husqvarna IF | 22 | 13 | 4 | 5 | 52 | 29 | +23 | 30 | Promoted |
| 2 | Waggeryds IK | 22 | 12 | 3 | 7 | 61 | 42 | +19 | 27 | |
| 3 | Tranemo IF | 22 | 10 | 7 | 5 | 52 | 34 | +18 | 27 | |
| 4 | Gnosjö IF | 22 | 11 | 5 | 6 | 55 | 46 | +9 | 27 | |
| 5 | Nässjö IF | 22 | 9 | 6 | 7 | 40 | 53 | −13 | 24 | |
| 6 | IK Tord, Jönköping | 22 | 10 | 3 | 9 | 52 | 55 | −3 | 23 | |
| 7 | Gislaveds IS | 22 | 8 | 6 | 8 | 56 | 46 | +10 | 22 | |
| 8 | Grimsås IF | 22 | 8 | 6 | 8 | 45 | 51 | −6 | 22 | |
| 9 | Huskvarna Södra IS | 22 | 8 | 4 | 10 | 40 | 51 | −11 | 20 | |
| 10 | IFK Värnamo | 22 | 8 | 2 | 12 | 53 | 42 | +11 | 18 | Relegated |
| 11 | Anderstorps IF | 22 | 5 | 5 | 12 | 35 | 57 | −22 | 15 | Relegated |
| 12 | Bankeryds SK | 22 | 3 | 3 | 16 | 34 | 76 | −42 | 9 | Relegated |

=== Sydöstra Götaland 1962 ===
| Pos | Team | Pld | W | D | L | GF | GA | GD | Pts | Promotion or relegation |
|---|---|---|---|---|---|---|---|---|---|---|
| 1 | Bromölla IF | 20 | 10 | 9 | 1 | 55 | 20 | +35 | 29 | Promoted |
| 2 | IFK Karlshamn | 20 | 13 | 2 | 5 | 74 | 29 | +45 | 28 | |
| 3 | Kalmar AIK | 20 | 11 | 5 | 4 | 50 | 27 | +23 | 27 | |
| 4 | IFK Oskarshamn | 20 | 11 | 2 | 7 | 48 | 32 | +16 | 24 | |
| 5 | Kristianstads BIF | 20 | 9 | 4 | 7 | 34 | 28 | +6 | 22 | |
| 6 | Ronneby BK | 20 | 8 | 3 | 9 | 36 | 42 | −6 | 19 | |
| 7 | Olofströms IF | 20 | 7 | 5 | 8 | 29 | 39 | −10 | 19 | |
| 8 | IF Trion, Spjutsbygd | 20 | 6 | 5 | 9 | 31 | 48 | −17 | 17 | |
| 9 | Oskarshamns AIK | 20 | 6 | 4 | 10 | 35 | 41 | −6 | 16 | Relegated |
| 10 | Mjällby AIF | 20 | 5 | 3 | 12 | 34 | 61 | −27 | 13 | Relegated |
| 11 | Svängsta IF | 20 | 1 | 4 | 15 | 21 | 80 | −59 | 6 | Relegated |

=== Sydvästra Götaland 1962 ===
| Pos | Team | Pld | W | D | L | GF | GA | GD | Pts | Promotion or relegation |
|---|---|---|---|---|---|---|---|---|---|---|
| 1 | Kinna IF | 22 | 14 | 5 | 3 | 50 | 21 | +29 | 33 | Promoted |
| 2 | Jonsereds IF | 22 | 13 | 5 | 4 | 60 | 29 | +31 | 31 | |
| 3 | Viskafors IF | 22 | 13 | 4 | 5 | 61 | 37 | +24 | 30 | |
| 4 | Fässbergs IF, Mölndal | 22 | 14 | 1 | 7 | 42 | 34 | +8 | 29 | |
| 5 | IFK Örby, Kinna | 22 | 9 | 7 | 6 | 47 | 37 | +10 | 25 | |
| 6 | Alingsås IF | 22 | 9 | 5 | 8 | 26 | 30 | −4 | 23 | |
| 7 | Tibro AIK | 22 | 9 | 2 | 11 | 36 | 35 | +1 | 20 | |
| 8 | Skara IF | 22 | 7 | 4 | 11 | 34 | 45 | −11 | 18 | |
| 9 | Morups IF | 22 | 7 | 3 | 12 | 35 | 43 | −8 | 17 | |
| 10 | Stenkullens GIK, Göteborg | 22 | 7 | 1 | 14 | 43 | 60 | −17 | 15 | Relegated |
| 11 | IFK Hjo | 22 | 4 | 5 | 13 | 33 | 53 | −20 | 13 | Relegated |
| 12 | Skene IF | 22 | 4 | 2 | 16 | 29 | 72 | −43 | 10 | Relegated |

=== Södra Götaland 1962 ===
| Pos | Team | Pld | W | D | L | GF | GA | GD | Pts | Promotion or relegation |
|---|---|---|---|---|---|---|---|---|---|---|
| 1 | Gunnarstorps IF | 26 | 17 | 5 | 4 | 65 | 22 | +43 | 39 | Promoted |
| 2 | Limhamns IF | 26 | 17 | 2 | 7 | 54 | 37 | +17 | 36 | |
| 3 | Hässleholms IF | 26 | 13 | 3 | 10 | 41 | 31 | +10 | 29 | |
| 4 | GIF Nike, Lomma | 26 | 11 | 7 | 8 | 47 | 45 | +2 | 29 | |
| 5 | IF Allians, Malmö | 26 | 11 | 4 | 11 | 37 | 32 | +5 | 26 | |
| 6 | IFK Hässleholm | 26 | 11 | 3 | 12 | 53 | 58 | −5 | 25 | |
| 7 | Eslövs IK | 26 | 9 | 7 | 10 | 44 | 50 | −6 | 25 | |
| 8 | Perstorps SK | 26 | 9 | 6 | 11 | 45 | 39 | +6 | 24 | |
| 9 | IFK Ystad | 26 | 9 | 6 | 11 | 43 | 45 | −2 | 24 | |
| 10 | Lunds BK | 26 | 8 | 7 | 11 | 40 | 42 | −2 | 23 | |
| 11 | Billesholms GIF | 26 | 8 | 7 | 11 | 38 | 49 | −11 | 23 | |
| 12 | Höganäs BK | 26 | 7 | 7 | 12 | 39 | 37 | +2 | 21 | Relegated |
| 13 | Högaborgs BK, Hälsingborg | 26 | 6 | 8 | 12 | 31 | 58 | −27 | 20 | Relegated |
| 14 | Eskilsminne IF, Hälsingborg | 26 | 8 | 4 | 14 | 42 | 74 | −32 | 20 | Relegated |
