= 1969 Division 3 (Swedish football) =

Swedish League Division 3
- Season: 1969
- Champions: Luleå SK (not promoted); Lycksele IF; IFK Östersund; Essviks AIF; Köpings IS; IF Brommapojkarna; IF Karlskoga/Bofors; IK City; Norrby IF; Nybro IF; Perstorps SK; Hovås IF; IFK Ystad
- Promoted: 12 teams above
- Relegated: 36 teams

Statistics of Swedish football Division 3 for the 1969 season.

== League standings ==
=== Norra Norrland, Övre 1969 ===
Pos	Team	Pld	W	D	L	GF	GA	GD	Pts	Qualification or relegation
1	Luleå SK	18	11	4	3	34	12	+22	26	Promotion Playoffs
2	Storfors Arbetares IK	18	11	4	3	38	21	+17	26	
3	Gammelstads IF	18	9	4	5	28	21	+7	22	
4	Bodens BK	18	8	4	6	30	26	+4	20	
5	IFK Kalix	18	8	3	7	25	23	+2	19	
6	Norrfjärdens IF	18	4	7	7	16	21	−5	15	
7	Överkalix IF	18	5	5	8	20	29	−9	15	
8	IFK Kiruna	18	6	3	9	19	28	−9	15	
9	Kebnekaise IK, Kiruna	18	5	3	10	20	33	−13	13	Relegated
10	IFK Råneå	18	2	5	11	17	33	−16	9	Relegated

=== Norra Norrland, Nedre 1969 ===
Pos	Team	Pld	W	D	L	GF	GA	GD	Pts	Promotion or relegation
1	Lycksele IF	18	12	3	3	30	11	+19	27	Promotion Playoffs – Promoted
2	Byske IF	18	9	4	5	30	20	+10	22	
3	Norsjö IF	18	7	5	6	34	25	+9	19	
4	Clemensnäs IF	18	7	5	6	27	23	+4	19	
5	Sandviks IK, Holmsund	18	7	5	6	26	22	+4	19	
6	Sunnan SK	18	4	10	4	22	24	−2	18	
7	Husums IF	18	5	6	7	14	24	−10	16	
8	Myckle IK	18	5	4	9	19	30	−11	14	
9	Vebomarks IF	18	4	5	9	13	20	−7	13	Relegated
10	Täfteå IK	18	4	5	9	15	31	−16	13	Relegated

=== Södra Norrland, Övre 1969 ===
Pos	Team	Pld	W	D	L	GF	GA	GD	Pts	Promotion or relegation
1	IFK Östersund	18	10	3	5	36	19	+17	23	Promotion Playoffs – Promoted
2	Hägglunds IoFK, Gullänget	18	10	3	5	30	23	+7	23	
3	IF Friska Viljor, Örnsköldsvik	18	8	4	6	33	19	+14	20	
4	Frösö IF	18	9	1	8	33	29	+4	19	
5	Timrå IK	18	7	4	7	30	32	−2	18	
6	Ope IF	18	8	2	8	23	27	−4	18	
7	Alnö IF	18	7	3	8	26	30	−4	17	
8	MoDo AIK, Alfredshem	18	6	4	8	31	31	0	16	
9	Kramfors IF	18	6	4	8	26	36	−10	16	Relegated
10	Ramviks IF	18	4	2	12	23	45	−22	10	Relegated

=== Södra Norrland, Nedre 1969 ===
Pos	Team	Pld	W	D	L	GF	GA	GD	Pts	Promotion or relegation
1	Essviks AIF	22	12	8	2	46	22	+24	32	Promotion Playoffs – Promoted
2	Kubikenborgs IF, Sundsvall	22	14	3	5	38	20	+18	31	
3	IFK Sundsvall	22	13	4	5	50	23	+27	30	
4	Sandvikens AIK	22	13	4	5	51	25	+26	30	
5	Hudiksvalls ABK	22	12	4	6	45	33	+12	28	
6	Åshammars IK	22	11	3	8	47	35	+12	25	
7	Bollnäs GIF	22	9	4	9	42	42	0	22	
8	IFK Bergvik	22	8	5	9	33	37	−4	21	
9	Söderhamns IF	22	5	6	11	29	34	−5	16	
10	Årsunda IF	22	4	6	12	20	45	−25	14	Relegated
11	Älvros IK	22	3	3	16	26	70	−44	9	Relegated
12	Strands IF, Hudiksvall	22	3	0	19	19	60	−41	6	Relegated

=== Norra Svealand 1969 ===
Pos	Team	Pld	W	D	L	GF	GA	GD	Pts	Promotion or relegation
1	Köpings IS	22	17	2	3	55	18	+37	36	Promoted
2	Arboga Södra IF	22	15	3	4	56	33	+23	33	
3	BK Forward, Örebro	22	14	1	7	53	38	+15	29	
4	Avesta AIK	22	11	5	6	39	26	+13	27	
5	Västerås SK	22	11	3	8	51	34	+17	25	
6	Norbergs AIF	22	9	4	9	40	37	+3	22	
7	Karlslunds IF, Örebro	22	8	4	10	28	33	−5	20	
8	Krylbo IF	22	7	2	13	29	41	−12	16	
9	Fagersta AIK	22	4	8	10	29	46	−17	16	
10	Gestrike-Hammarby IF	22	5	6	11	25	55	−30	16	Relegated
11	Hallstahammars SK	22	4	5	13	34	52	−18	13	Relegated
12	IFK Kumla	22	3	5	14	23	49	−26	11	Relegated

=== Östra Svealand 1969 ===
Pos	Team	Pld	W	D	L	GF	GA	GD	Pts	Promotion or relegation
1	IF Brommapojkarna, Bromma	22	17	5	0	57	7	+50	39	Promoted
2	Edsbro IF	22	11	7	4	35	16	+19	29	
3	Upsala IF, Uppsala	22	13	2	7	44	19	+25	28	
4	IF Vesta, Uppsala	22	11	4	7	38	32	+6	26	
5	Enköpings SK	22	10	5	7	27	28	−1	25	
6	Hallsta IK, Hallstavik	22	10	3	9	35	30	+5	23	
7	Väsby IK, Upplands-Väsby	22	10	3	9	33	32	+1	23	
8	Stockholms IF	22	8	5	9	37	29	+8	21	
9	Nynäshamns IF	22	7	4	11	33	52	−19	18	
10	IF Olympia, Stockholm	22	5	3	14	25	43	−18	13	Relegated
11	IK Hinden, Upplands-Bälinge	22	3	5	14	22	43	−21	11	Relegated
12	Jakobsbergs GIF	22	3	2	17	14	69	−55	8	Relegated

=== Västra Svealand 1969 ===
Pos	Team	Pld	W	D	L	GF	GA	GD	Pts	Promotion or relegation
1	IF Karlskoga/Bofors (KB'63)	22	16	5	1	66	10	+56	37	Promoted
2	Trollhättans IF	22	16	2	4	53	29	+24	34	
3	IFK Sunne	22	12	3	7	48	25	+23	27	
4	IF Viken, Åmål	22	8	8	6	40	35	+5	24	
5	Melleruds IF	22	9	4	9	47	37	+10	22	
6	Bengtsfors IF	22	9	3	10	40	48	−8	21	
7	IK Oddevold, Uddevalla	22	7	6	9	53	44	+9	20	
8	IFK Kristinehamn	22	7	6	9	20	34	−14	20	
9	SK Sifhälla, Säffle	22	6	6	10	35	46	−11	18	
10	IFK Uddevalla	22	7	2	13	44	59	−15	16	Relegated
11	Immetorps BK, Valåsen	22	6	4	12	21	72	−51	16	Relegated
12	Skärhamns IK	22	2	5	15	27	55	−28	9	Relegated

=== Nordöstra Götaland 1969 ===
Pos	Team	Pld	W	D	L	GF	GA	GD	Pts	Promotion or relegation
1	IK City, Eskilstuna	22	15	3	4	63	24	+39	33	Promoted
2	Finspångs AIK	22	16	1	5	58	27	+31	33	
3	BK Derby, Linköping	22	12	3	7	36	19	+17	27	
4	Flens IF	22	9	8	5	34	29	+5	26	
5	BK Kenty, Linköping	22	9	6	7	36	31	+5	24	
6	Nyköpings BIS	22	9	5	8	45	32	+13	23	
7	Smedby AIS, Norrköping	22	9	2	11	29	56	−27	20	
8	Motala AIF	22	8	3	11	42	37	+5	19	
9	IFK Vreta Kloster	22	6	7	9	25	35	−10	19	
10	BK Wolfram, Linköping	22	7	3	12	29	46	−17	17	Relegated
11	IF Starka Viljor, Motala	22	6	3	13	37	44	−7	15	Relegated
12	Oxelösunds SK	22	2	4	16	14	68	−54	8	Relegated

=== Nordvästra Götaland 1969 ===
Pos	Team	Pld	W	D	L	GF	GA	GD	Pts	Promotion or relegation
1	Norrby IF, Borås	22	15	6	1	63	26	+37	36	Promoted
2	Alingsås IF	22	13	4	5	34	25	+9	30	
3	Gnosjö IF	22	11	5	6	42	32	+10	27	
4	IFK Falköping	22	10	6	6	37	21	+16	26	
5	Skene IF	22	11	1	10	41	29	+12	23	
6	IFK Ulricehamn	22	9	5	8	35	31	+4	23	
7	IF Heimer, Lidköping	22	8	6	8	32	32	0	22	
8	Tibro AIK	22	9	3	10	43	38	+5	21	
9	Skara IF	22	7	5	10	33	42	−9	19	
10	Limmareds IF	22	5	7	10	22	36	−14	17	Relegated
11	Gerdskens BK, Alingsås	22	6	4	12	27	46	−19	16	Relegated
12	Kållands GIF	22	1	2	19	14	65	−51	4	Relegated

=== Mellersta Götaland 1969 ===
Pos	Team	Pld	W	D	L	GF	GA	GD	Pts	Promotion or relegation
1	Nybro IF	22	17	4	1	74	18	+56	38	Promoted
2	Myresjö IF	22	15	2	5	41	19	+22	32	
3	Vimmerby IF	22	14	2	6	51	31	+20	30	
4	Tranås BoIS	22	9	6	7	24	31	−7	24	
5	Emmaboda IS	22	9	5	8	35	32	+3	23	
6	Hvetlanda GIF, Vetlanda	22	8	5	9	33	34	−1	21	
7	Nässjö IF	22	7	7	8	37	41	−4	21	
8	IF Hallby, Jönköping	21	8	4	9	33	47	−14	20	
9	Huskvarna Södra IS	22	7	3	12	37	36	+1	17	
10	Tranås AIF	22	7	1	14	36	58	−22	15	Relegated
11	Mönsterås GIF	22	5	2	15	20	45	−25	12	Relegated
12	Husqvarna IF, Huskvarna	22	4	3	15	26	55	−29	11	Relegated

=== Sydöstra Götaland 1969 ===
Pos	Team	Pld	W	D	L	GF	GA	GD	Pts	Promotion or relegation
1	Perstorps SK	22	11	6	5	39	26	+13	28	Promoted
2	Högadals IS, Karlshamn	22	11	4	7	33	30	+3	26	
3	Kristianstads BI	22	8	9	5	27	21	+6	25	
4	Vilans BoIF, Kristianstad	22	11	2	9	38	30	+8	24	
5	Jämshögs IF	22	8	7	7	35	32	+3	23	
6	Liatorps IF	22	9	4	9	28	33	−5	22	
7	IFK Osby	22	9	4	9	36	46	−10	22	
8	Tollarps IF	22	7	7	8	36	33	+3	21	
9	Växjö BK	22	7	6	9	41	42	−1	20	
10	IFK Kristianstad	22	7	5	10	29	30	−1	19	Relegated
11	IFK Hässleholm	22	6	6	10	21	32	−11	18	Relegated
12	Alvesta GIF	22	5	6	11	30	38	−8	16	Relegated

=== Sydvästra Götaland 1969 ===
Pos	Team	Pld	W	D	L	GF	GA	GD	Pts	Promotion or relegation
1	Hovås IF	22	19	1	2	61	22	+39	39	Promoted
2	Kungsbacka BIK	22	11	7	4	39	23	+16	29	
3	Varbergs BoIS	22	8	9	5	51	37	+14	25	
4	Göteborgs AIK	22	9	7	6	42	35	+7	25	
5	Kullens BK, Göteborg	22	8	5	9	31	32	−1	21	
6	Getinge IF	22	9	3	10	34	36	−2	21	
7	IF Stendy, Göteborg	22	8	4	10	35	43	−8	20	
8	IK Kongahlla, Kungälv	22	5	9	8	34	47	−13	19	
9	BK Qviding, Göteborg	22	5	8	9	40	47	−7	18	
10	Nyhems BK, Halmstad	22	6	6	10	31	38	−7	18	Relegated
11	IF Warta, Göteborg	22	6	3	13	28	45	−17	15	Relegated
12	Redbergslids IK, Göteborg	22	6	2	14	25	46	−21	14	Relegated

=== Skåne 1969 ===
Pos	Team	Pld	W	D	L	GF	GA	GD	Pts	Promotion or relegation
1	IFK Ystad	22	19	1	2	65	25	+40	39	Promoted
2	Trelleborgs FF	22	14	2	6	46	31	+15	30	
3	Limhamns IF	22	11	4	7	54	36	+18	26	
4	Gunnarstorps IF	22	9	6	7	48	33	+15	24	
5	GIF Nike, Lomma	22	10	4	8	35	35	0	24	
6	Åstorps IF	22	9	5	8	24	27	−3	23	
7	Arlövs BIF	22	9	4	9	34	35	−1	22	
8	Lunds BK	22	9	3	10	34	30	+4	21	
9	Malmö BI	22	7	6	9	34	39	−5	20	
10	Kävlinge GIF	22	7	5	10	27	41	−14	19	Relegated
11	Tomelilla IF	22	3	4	15	26	56	−30	10	Relegated
12	Eskilsminne IF, Hälsingborg	22	2	2	18	35	74	−39	6	Relegated
