= 1966 Division 3 (Swedish football) =

Swedish League Division 3
- Season: 1966
- Champions: Storfors Arbetares IK (not promoted); Skellefteå AIK/IF; IF Friska Viljor; Ljusdals IF (not promoted); Hallstahammars SK; IK Sirius; IFK Arvika; BK Derby; Göteborgs AIK; Skövde AIK; IFK Kristianstad; Västra Frölunda IF; IFK Trelleborg
- Promoted: 11 teams above and Sölvesborgs GIF
- Relegated: 35 teams

Statistics of Swedish football Division 3 for the 1966 season.

== League standings ==
=== Norra Norrland, Övre 1966 ===
| Pos | Team | Pld | W | D | L | GF | GA | GD | Pts | Qualification or relegation |
|---|---|---|---|---|---|---|---|---|---|---|
| 1 | Storfors Arbetares IK | 18 | 12 | 2 | 4 | 51 | 25 | +26 | 26 | Promotion Playoffs |
| 2 | Bodens BK | 18 | 11 | 1 | 6 | 43 | 19 | +24 | 23 | |
| 3 | Malmbergets AIK | 18 | 10 | 3 | 5 | 47 | 38 | +9 | 23 | |
| 4 | Kebnekaise IK, Kiruna | 18 | 10 | 3 | 5 | 29 | 27 | +2 | 23 | |
| 5 | Vittjärvs IK | 18 | 6 | 3 | 9 | 26 | 34 | −8 | 15 | |
| 6 | Överkalix IF | 18 | 6 | 3 | 9 | 23 | 28 | −5 | 15 | |
| 7 | IFK Kiruna | 18 | 5 | 4 | 9 | 27 | 34 | −7 | 14 | |
| 8 | IFK Råneå | 18 | 4 | 6 | 8 | 27 | 35 | −8 | 14 | |
| 9 | Lira BK, Luleå | 18 | 5 | 4 | 9 | 29 | 39 | −10 | 14 | Relegated |
| 10 | Piteå IF | 18 | 6 | 1 | 11 | 26 | 39 | −13 | 13 | Relegated |

=== Norra Norrland, Nedre 1966 ===
| Pos | Team | Pld | W | D | L | GF | GA | GD | Pts | Promotion or relegation |
|---|---|---|---|---|---|---|---|---|---|---|
| 1 | Skellefteå AIK/IF | 18 | 14 | 4 | 0 | 37 | 9 | +28 | 32 | Promotion Playoffs - Promoted |
| 2 | Byske IF | 18 | 12 | 0 | 6 | 46 | 26 | +20 | 24 | |
| 3 | Sunnanå SK | 18 | 9 | 4 | 5 | 36 | 29 | +7 | 22 | |
| 4 | Gimonäs CK, Umeå | 18 | 9 | 3 | 6 | 38 | 24 | +14 | 21 | |
| 5 | Myckle IK | 18 | 7 | 3 | 8 | 34 | 41 | −7 | 17 | |
| 6 | Obbola IK | 18 | 6 | 2 | 10 | 21 | 36 | −15 | 14 | |
| 7 | Vebomarks IF | 18 | 5 | 3 | 10 | 27 | 30 | −3 | 13 | |
| 8 | Norsjö IF | 18 | 6 | 1 | 11 | 22 | 29 | −7 | 13 | |
| 9 | IFK Umeå | 18 | 6 | 1 | 11 | 27 | 39 | −12 | 13 | Relegated |
| 10 | Medle SK | 18 | 4 | 3 | 11 | 24 | 49 | −25 | 11 | Relegated |

=== Södra Norrland, Övre 1966 ===
| Pos | Team | Pld | W | D | L | GF | GA | GD | Pts | Promotion or relegation |
|---|---|---|---|---|---|---|---|---|---|---|
| 1 | IF Friska Viljor, Örnsköldsvik | 18 | 15 | 2 | 1 | 47 | 13 | +34 | 32 | Promotion Playoffs - Promoted |
| 2 | Husums IF | 18 | 11 | 4 | 3 | 37 | 19 | +18 | 26 | |
| 3 | Frösö IF | 18 | 10 | 2 | 6 | 32 | 19 | +13 | 22 | |
| 4 | Kramfors IF | 18 | 9 | 2 | 7 | 35 | 30 | +5 | 20 | |
| 5 | MoDo AIK, Alfredshem | 18 | 8 | 2 | 8 | 27 | 28 | −1 | 18 | |
| 6 | Sunds IF, Sundsbruk | 18 | 4 | 6 | 8 | 18 | 20 | −2 | 14 | |
| 7 | Wifsta/Östrand-Fagerviks IF, Timrå | 18 | 6 | 2 | 10 | 26 | 30 | −4 | 14 | |
| 8 | Sollefteå GIF | 18 | 6 | 2 | 10 | 25 | 34 | −9 | 14 | |
| 9 | IF Älgarna, Härnösand | 18 | 5 | 2 | 11 | 19 | 41 | −22 | 12 | Relegated |
| 10 | Krokom/Dvärsätts IF | 18 | 4 | 0 | 14 | 29 | 61 | −32 | 8 | Relegated |

=== Södra Norrland, Nedre 1966 ===
| Pos | Team | Pld | W | D | L | GF | GA | GD | Pts | Qualification or relegation |
|---|---|---|---|---|---|---|---|---|---|---|
| 1 | Ljusdals IF | 18 | 12 | 3 | 3 | 38 | 16 | +22 | 27 | Promotion Playoffs |
| 2 | Sandarne SIF | 18 | 10 | 4 | 4 | 28 | 15 | +13 | 24 | |
| 3 | Stockviksverkens IF | 18 | 10 | 2 | 6 | 33 | 28 | +5 | 22 | |
| 4 | Essviks AIF | 18 | 8 | 4 | 6 | 38 | 27 | +11 | 20 | |
| 5 | Svartviks IF | 18 | 8 | 2 | 8 | 31 | 29 | +2 | 18 | |
| 6 | Söderhamns IF | 18 | 6 | 6 | 6 | 32 | 35 | −3 | 18 | |
| 7 | Kubikenborgs IF, Sundsvall | 18 | 7 | 3 | 8 | 28 | 32 | −4 | 17 | |
| 8 | Bollnäs GIF | 18 | 5 | 5 | 8 | 27 | 37 | −10 | 15 | |
| 9 | Ljusne AIK | 18 | 5 | 2 | 11 | 30 | 42 | −12 | 12 | Relegated |
| 10 | Delsbo IF | 18 | 1 | 5 | 12 | 13 | 37 | −24 | 7 | Relegated |

=== Norra Svealand 1966 ===
| Pos | Team | Pld | W | D | L | GF | GA | GD | Pts | Promotion or relegation |
|---|---|---|---|---|---|---|---|---|---|---|
| 1 | Hallstahammars SK | 22 | 15 | 5 | 2 | 81 | 32 | +49 | 35 | Promoted |
| 2 | Köpings IS | 22 | 11 | 5 | 6 | 54 | 38 | +16 | 27 | |
| 3 | IFK Västerås | 22 | 9 | 8 | 5 | 45 | 36 | +9 | 26 | |
| 4 | Fagersta AIK | 22 | 11 | 2 | 9 | 65 | 45 | +20 | 24 | |
| 5 | Åshammars IK | 22 | 11 | 1 | 10 | 48 | 44 | +4 | 23 | |
| 6 | Skutskärs IF | 22 | 9 | 3 | 10 | 52 | 55 | −3 | 21 | |
| 7 | Enköpings SK | 22 | 9 | 3 | 10 | 27 | 38 | −11 | 21 | |
| 8 | Västerås IK | 22 | 7 | 6 | 9 | 35 | 43 | −8 | 20 | |
| 9 | Malungs IF | 22 | 7 | 5 | 10 | 40 | 64 | −24 | 19 | |
| 10 | Norbergs AIF | 22 | 9 | 0 | 13 | 29 | 44 | −15 | 18 | Relegated |
| 11 | IK Heros, Smedjebacken | 22 | 7 | 3 | 12 | 32 | 54 | −22 | 17 | Relegated |
| 12 | IK Franke, Västerås | 22 | 6 | 1 | 15 | 44 | 59 | −15 | 13 | Relegated |

=== Östra Svealand 1966 ===
| Pos | Team | Pld | W | D | L | GF | GA | GD | Pts | Promotion or relegation |
|---|---|---|---|---|---|---|---|---|---|---|
| 1 | IK Sirius, Uppsala | 22 | 17 | 2 | 3 | 69 | 14 | +55 | 36 | Promoted |
| 2 | Råsunda IS, Solna | 22 | 14 | 2 | 6 | 48 | 24 | +24 | 30 | |
| 3 | Älvsjö AIK | 22 | 12 | 5 | 5 | 49 | 22 | +27 | 29 | |
| 4 | IK City, Eskilstuna | 22 | 12 | 4 | 6 | 48 | 38 | +10 | 28 | |
| 5 | Väsby IK, Upplands-Väsby | 22 | 11 | 4 | 7 | 59 | 37 | +22 | 26 | |
| 6 | Gustavsbergs IF | 22 | 11 | 3 | 8 | 24 | 26 | −2 | 25 | |
| 7 | Upsala IF, Uppsala | 22 | 8 | 5 | 9 | 34 | 42 | −8 | 21 | |
| 8 | Spånga IS | 22 | 6 | 7 | 9 | 29 | 36 | −7 | 19 | |
| 9 | BK Vargarna, Norrtälje | 22 | 8 | 3 | 11 | 34 | 51 | −17 | 19 | |
| 10 | Hargs BK | 22 | 6 | 4 | 12 | 17 | 45 | −28 | 16 | Relegated |
| 11 | IF Verdandi, Eskilstuna | 22 | 3 | 2 | 17 | 21 | 69 | −48 | 8 | Relegated |
| 12 | Malmköpings IF | 22 | 2 | 3 | 17 | 24 | 52 | −28 | 7 | Relegated |

=== Västra Svealand 1966 ===
| Pos | Team | Pld | W | D | L | GF | GA | GD | Pts | Promotion or relegation |
|---|---|---|---|---|---|---|---|---|---|---|
| 1 | IFK Arvika | 22 | 15 | 5 | 2 | 64 | 28 | +36 | 35 | Promoted |
| 2 | IF Karlskoga-Bofors 63 | 22 | 13 | 4 | 5 | 63 | 34 | +29 | 30 | |
| 3 | Bengtsfors IF | 22 | 13 | 1 | 8 | 62 | 43 | +19 | 27 | |
| 4 | IF Viken, Åmål | 22 | 11 | 4 | 7 | 47 | 35 | +12 | 26 | |
| 5 | Melleruds IF | 22 | 11 | 3 | 8 | 60 | 49 | +11 | 25 | |
| 6 | Torsby IF | 22 | 7 | 8 | 7 | 61 | 50 | +11 | 22 | |
| 7 | Gullspångs IF | 22 | 8 | 6 | 8 | 37 | 43 | −6 | 22 | |
| 8 | Bergsängs BK | 22 | 6 | 7 | 9 | 45 | 63 | −18 | 19 | |
| 9 | IFK Lindesberg | 22 | 6 | 7 | 9 | 45 | 63 | −18 | 19 | |
| 10 | Karlslunds IF, Örebro | 22 | 4 | 6 | 12 | 28 | 46 | −18 | 14 | Relegated |
| 11 | IFK Kumla | 22 | 4 | 6 | 12 | 31 | 52 | −21 | 14 | Relegated |
| 12 | IF Örnen, Charlottenberg | 22 | 4 | 2 | 16 | 37 | 89 | −52 | 10 | Relegated |

=== Nordöstra Götaland 1966 ===
| Pos | Team | Pld | W | D | L | GF | GA | GD | Pts | Promotion or relegation |
|---|---|---|---|---|---|---|---|---|---|---|
| 1 | BK Derby, Linköping | 22 | 16 | 4 | 2 | 64 | 19 | +45 | 36 | Promoted |
| 2 | BK Kenty, Linköping | 22 | 13 | 3 | 6 | 71 | 35 | +36 | 29 | |
| 3 | Nyköpings BIS | 22 | 13 | 2 | 7 | 64 | 34 | +30 | 28 | |
| 4 | IK Sleipner, Norrköping | 22 | 10 | 6 | 6 | 48 | 26 | +22 | 26 | |
| 5 | Gamleby IF | 22 | 10 | 3 | 9 | 36 | 36 | 0 | 23 | |
| 6 | Motala AIF | 22 | 10 | 3 | 9 | 31 | 34 | −3 | 23 | |
| 7 | Mjölby Södra IF | 22 | 10 | 1 | 11 | 36 | 37 | −1 | 21 | |
| 8 | Tranås BoIS | 22 | 10 | 1 | 11 | 30 | 47 | −17 | 21 | |
| 9 | Borens IK, Motala | 22 | 9 | 2 | 11 | 28 | 41 | −13 | 20 | |
| 10 | IFK Motala | 22 | 6 | 5 | 11 | 35 | 45 | −10 | 17 | Relegated |
| 11 | IF Sylvia, Norrköping | 22 | 4 | 2 | 16 | 23 | 63 | −40 | 10 | Relegated |
| 12 | Katrineholms SK | 22 | 4 | 2 | 16 | 29 | 78 | −49 | 10 | Relegated |

=== Nordvästra Götaland 1966 ===
| Pos | Team | Pld | W | D | L | GF | GA | GD | Pts | Promotion or relegation |
|---|---|---|---|---|---|---|---|---|---|---|
| 1 | Göteborgs AIK | 22 | 13 | 3 | 6 | 38 | 27 | +11 | 29 | Promoted |
| 2 | Kinna IF | 22 | 11 | 3 | 8 | 43 | 37 | +6 | 25 | |
| 3 | Trollhättans IF | 22 | 12 | 1 | 9 | 46 | 42 | +4 | 25 | |
| 4 | IK Kongahälla, Kungälv | 22 | 11 | 3 | 8 | 37 | 38 | −1 | 25 | |
| 5 | Norrby IF, Borås | 22 | 9 | 6 | 7 | 42 | 31 | +11 | 24 | |
| 6 | Göteborgs FF | 22 | 11 | 2 | 9 | 55 | 52 | +3 | 24 | |
| 7 | Gerdskens BK, Alingsås | 22 | 10 | 3 | 9 | 48 | 46 | +2 | 23 | |
| 8 | Vänersborgs IF | 22 | 9 | 4 | 9 | 51 | 46 | +5 | 22 | |
| 9 | Kungshamns IF | 22 | 9 | 3 | 10 | 47 | 51 | −4 | 21 | |
| 10 | IK Oddevold, Uddevalla | 22 | 6 | 5 | 11 | 42 | 47 | −5 | 17 | Relegated |
| 11 | Skärhamns IK | 22 | 6 | 3 | 13 | 40 | 50 | −10 | 15 | Relegated |
| 12 | BK Häcken, Göteborg | 22 | 6 | 2 | 14 | 35 | 57 | −22 | 14 | Relegated |

=== Mellersta Götaland 1966 ===
| Pos | Team | Pld | W | D | L | GF | GA | GD | Pts | Promotion or relegation |
|---|---|---|---|---|---|---|---|---|---|---|
| 1 | Skövde AIK | 22 | 17 | 3 | 2 | 61 | 19 | +42 | 37 | Promoted |
| 2 | Hvetlanda GIF, Vetlanda | 22 | 15 | 2 | 5 | 38 | 23 | +15 | 32 | |
| 3 | IFK Ulricehamn | 22 | 13 | 2 | 7 | 59 | 31 | +28 | 28 | |
| 4 | Skara IF | 22 | 10 | 4 | 8 | 42 | 44 | −2 | 24 | |
| 5 | Växjö BK | 22 | 10 | 3 | 9 | 39 | 42 | −3 | 23 | |
| 6 | IFK Tidaholm | 22 | 9 | 3 | 10 | 43 | 51 | −8 | 21 | |
| 7 | Anderstorps IF | 22 | 7 | 6 | 9 | 46 | 48 | −2 | 20 | |
| 8 | Huskvarna Södra IS | 22 | 10 | 0 | 12 | 42 | 52 | −10 | 20 | |
| 9 | Waggeryds IK | 22 | 8 | 3 | 11 | 35 | 40 | −5 | 19 | |
| 10 | Ulricehamns IF | 22 | 4 | 7 | 11 | 35 | 42 | −7 | 15 | Relegated |
| 11 | Husqvarna IF | 22 | 3 | 8 | 11 | 31 | 51 | −20 | 14 | Relegated |
| 12 | IK Tord, Jönköping | 22 | 4 | 3 | 15 | 29 | 57 | −28 | 11 | Relegated |

=== Sydöstra Götaland 1966 ===
| Pos | Team | Pld | W | D | L | GF | GA | GD | Pts | Promotion or relegation |
|---|---|---|---|---|---|---|---|---|---|---|
| 1 | IFK Kristianstad | 22 | 14 | 3 | 5 | 47 | 34 | +13 | 31 | Promoted |
| 2 | Nybro IF | 22 | 13 | 4 | 5 | 52 | 35 | +17 | 30 | |
| 3 | Sölvesborgs GIF | 22 | 13 | 3 | 6 | 59 | 31 | +28 | 29 | Promoted |
| 4 | Jämshögs IF | 22 | 13 | 3 | 6 | 44 | 26 | +18 | 29 | |
| 5 | Blomstermåla IK | 22 | 10 | 7 | 5 | 45 | 44 | +1 | 27 | |
| 6 | Ronneby BK | 22 | 8 | 6 | 8 | 26 | 34 | −8 | 22 | |
| 7 | IFK Oskarshamn | 22 | 7 | 5 | 10 | 40 | 43 | −3 | 19 | |
| 8 | Högadals IS, Karlshamn | 22 | 8 | 3 | 11 | 28 | 38 | −10 | 19 | |
| 9 | Saxemara IF | 22 | 6 | 6 | 10 | 25 | 31 | −6 | 18 | |
| 10 | IFK Karlshamn | 22 | 6 | 5 | 11 | 23 | 42 | −19 | 17 | Relegated |
| 11 | Emmaboda IS | 22 | 7 | 1 | 14 | 38 | 53 | −15 | 15 | Relegated |
| 12 | Saltö BK, Karlskrona | 22 | 3 | 2 | 17 | 20 | 36 | −16 | 8 | Relegated |

=== Sydvästra Götaland 1966 ===
| Pos | Team | Pld | W | D | L | GF | GA | GD | Pts | Promotion or relegation |
|---|---|---|---|---|---|---|---|---|---|---|
| 1 | Västra Frölunda IF | 22 | 15 | 6 | 1 | 62 | 15 | +47 | 36 | Promoted |
| 2 | Halmstads BK | 22 | 14 | 4 | 4 | 55 | 18 | +37 | 32 | |
| 3 | IFK Hässleholm | 22 | 12 | 4 | 6 | 37 | 28 | +9 | 28 | |
| 4 | Fässbergs IF, Mölndal | 22 | 12 | 3 | 7 | 53 | 31 | +22 | 27 | |
| 5 | Varbergs GIF | 22 | 9 | 7 | 6 | 36 | 32 | +4 | 25 | |
| 6 | IFK Kungsbacka | 22 | 10 | 5 | 7 | 33 | 32 | +1 | 25 | |
| 7 | Överås BK, Göteborg | 22 | 8 | 2 | 12 | 25 | 32 | −7 | 18 | |
| 8 | Morups IF | 22 | 5 | 8 | 9 | 27 | 40 | −13 | 18 | |
| 9 | IFK Osby | 22 | 6 | 5 | 11 | 31 | 36 | −5 | 17 | |
| 10 | Strömsnäsbruks IF | 22 | 6 | 3 | 13 | 25 | 46 | −21 | 15 | Relegated |
| 11 | Getinge IF | 22 | 4 | 5 | 13 | 17 | 39 | −22 | 13 | Relegated |
| 12 | Vidkärrs IF, Göteborg | 22 | 3 | 4 | 15 | 21 | 73 | −52 | 10 | Relegated |

=== Skåne 1966 ===
| Pos | Team | Pld | W | D | L | GF | GA | GD | Pts | Promotion or relegation |
|---|---|---|---|---|---|---|---|---|---|---|
| 1 | IFK Trelleborg | 22 | 16 | 2 | 4 | 53 | 24 | +29 | 34 | Promoted |
| 2 | Åstorps IF | 22 | 15 | 2 | 5 | 55 | 32 | +23 | 32 | |
| 3 | Högaborgs BK, Hälsingborg | 22 | 10 | 7 | 5 | 53 | 43 | +10 | 27 | |
| 4 | Tollarps IF | 22 | 10 | 5 | 7 | 48 | 41 | +7 | 25 | |
| 5 | Klippans BIF | 22 | 10 | 4 | 8 | 45 | 45 | 0 | 24 | |
| 6 | Perstorps SK | 22 | 8 | 5 | 9 | 29 | 27 | +2 | 21 | |
| 7 | Tomelilla IF | 22 | 7 | 6 | 9 | 34 | 35 | −1 | 20 | |
| 8 | Råå IF | 22 | 7 | 5 | 10 | 43 | 46 | −3 | 19 | |
| 9 | Arlövs BIF | 22 | 7 | 4 | 11 | 41 | 47 | −6 | 18 | |
| 10 | Kirsebergs IF, Malmö | 22 | 8 | 2 | 12 | 55 | 62 | −7 | 18 | Relegated |
| 11 | Lunds BK | 22 | 6 | 5 | 11 | 45 | 44 | +1 | 17 | Relegated |
| 12 | Ystads IF | 22 | 2 | 5 | 15 | 32 | 87 | −55 | 9 | Relegated |
