= 1971 Division 3 (Swedish football) =

Swedish League Division 3
- Season: 1971
- Champions: Gammelstads IF; Hägglunds IoFK; IFK Sundsvall (p); Gefle IF (p); Västerås SK; Spånga IS (p); Kungshamns IF (p); BK Derby (p); Tidaholms GIF (p); Kalmar AIK; Hässleholms IF (p); IFK Ulricehamn; IFK Ystad (p)
- Promoted: 8 teams (p)
- Relegated: 36 teams

Statistics of Swedish football Division 3 for the 1971 season.

== League standings ==
=== Norra Norrland, Övre 1971 ===
Pos	Team	Pld	W	D	L	GF	GA	GD	Pts	Qualification or relegation
1	Gammelstads IF	18	13	3	2	43	12	+31	29	Promotion Playoffs
2	Notvikens IK	18	12	2	4	55	19	+36	26	
3	Gällivare SK	18	9	4	5	36	28	+8	22	
4	Norrfjärdens IF	18	9	4	5	28	21	+7	22	
5	Älvsby IF	18	9	3	6	40	32	+8	21	
6	Luleå SK	18	6	6	6	29	24	+5	18	
7	Överkalix IF	18	7	3	8	34	37	−3	17	
8	Assi IF, Karlsborgsverken	18	5	1	12	19	54	−35	11	
9	Ohtanajärvi IK	18	1	6	11	15	40	−25	8	Relegated
10	Storfors Arbetares IK	18	2	3	13	23	55	−32	7	Relegated

=== Norra Norrland, Nedre 1971 ===
Pos	Team	Pld	W	D	L	GF	GA	GD	Pts	Qualification or relegation
1	Hägglunds IoFK, Gullänget	18	11	5	2	29	13	+16	27	Promotion Playoffs
2	Sunnanå SK	18	11	2	5	35	23	+12	24	
3	Gimonäs CK	18	9	4	5	35	13	+22	22	
4	Norsjö IF	18	6	6	6	30	26	+4	18	
5	Myckle IK	18	6	4	8	14	21	−7	16	
6	Tegs SK	18	5	6	7	19	27	−8	16	
7	Täfteå IK	18	7	2	9	23	34	−11	16	
8	Malå IF	18	4	7	7	19	24	−5	15	
9	Rönnskärs IF, Skelleftehamn	18	5	5	8	19	25	−6	15	Relegated
10	Byske IF	18	4	3	11	18	38	−20	11	Relegated

=== Södra Norrland, Övre 1971 ===
Pos	Team	Pld	W	D	L	GF	GA	GD	Pts	Promotion or relegation
1	IFK Sundsvall	18	14	3	1	51	13	+38	31	Promotion Playoffs – Promoted
2	IFK Östersund	18	12	4	2	43	16	+27	28	
3	Ope IF	18	11	3	4	47	19	+28	25	
4	Kramfors-Alliansen	18	9	4	5	40	26	+14	22	
5	IFK Härnösand	18	8	6	4	30	15	+15	22	
6	IF Friska Viljor, Örnsköldsvik	18	6	5	7	24	24	0	17	
7	MoDo AIK, Alfredshem	18	5	1	12	19	50	−31	11	
8	Husums IF	18	2	5	11	18	38	−20	9	
9	Stuguns BK	18	1	6	11	19	50	−31	8	Relegated
10	Frösö IF	18	1	5	12	13	52	−39	7	Relegated

=== Södra Norrland, Nedre 1971 ===
Pos	Team	Pld	W	D	L	GF	GA	GD	Pts	Promotion or relegation
1	Gefle IF, Gävle	22	13	6	3	73	21	+52	32	Promotion Playoffs – Promoted
2	Hudiksvalls ABK	22	13	3	6	45	28	+17	29	
3	Ramsjö SK	22	11	7	4	33	18	+15	29	
4	Sandvikens AIK	22	11	2	9	40	35	+5	24	
5	Sunds IF, Sundsbruk	22	10	4	8	39	36	+3	24	
6	Hofors AIF	22	9	4	9	40	32	+8	22	
7	Essviks AIF	22	8	5	9	44	38	+6	21	
8	Åmots IF	22	8	4	10	36	48	−12	20	
9	Alnö IF	22	7	5	10	32	34	−2	19	
10	Söderhamns IF	22	7	5	10	25	36	−11	19	Relegated
11	Nors AIK	22	6	5	11	25	45	−20	17	Relegated
12	Stockviksverkens IF	22	1	6	15	14	75	−61	8	Relegated

=== Norra Svealand 1971 ===
Pos	Team	Pld	W	D	L	GF	GA	GD	Pts	Qualification or relegation
1	Västerås SK	22	15	3	4	45	22	+23	33	Promotion Playoffs
2	Falu BS, Falun	22	13	7	2	38	18	+20	33	
3	Fagersta Södra IK	22	10	7	5	40	27	+13	27	
4	Köpings IS	22	9	8	5	36	27	+9	26	
5	Malungs IF	22	5	12	5	27	25	+2	22	
6	BK Forward, Örebro	22	6	9	7	32	28	+4	21	
7	IFK Västerås	22	5	10	7	24	37	−13	20	
8	IFK Mora	22	8	3	11	30	34	−4	19	
9	Avesta AIK	22	7	4	11	30	31	−1	18	
10	Norbergs AIF	22	5	6	11	32	39	−7	16	Relegated
11	Frövi IK	22	6	4	12	25	43	−18	16	Relegated
12	Krylbo IF	22	3	7	12	20	48	−28	13	Relegated

=== Östra Svealand 1971 ===
Pos	Team	Pld	W	D	L	GF	GA	GD	Pts	Promotion or relegation
1	Spånga IS	22	13	5	4	50	17	+33	31	Promotion Playoffs – Promoted
2	Upsala IF, Uppsala	22	13	5	4	57	30	+27	31	
3	Enköpings SK	22	11	3	8	38	30	+8	25	
4	Edsbro IF	22	10	5	7	37	29	+8	25	
5	BK Vargarna, Norrtälje	22	10	4	8	44	30	+14	24	
6	Gimo IF	22	6	10	6	39	32	+7	22	
7	Sundbybergs IK	22	9	3	10	40	37	+3	21	
8	Väsby IK, Upplands-Väsby	22	8	5	9	25	30	−5	21	
9	Gustavsbergs IF	22	8	5	9	32	41	−9	21	
10	Visby IF Gute	22	6	7	9	47	64	−17	19	Relegated
11	Stockholms IF	22	4	7	11	23	45	−22	15	Relegated
12	Nynäshamns IF	22	3	3	16	24	71	−47	9	Relegated

=== Västra Svealand 1971 ===
Pos	Team	Pld	W	D	L	GF	GA	GD	Pts	Promotion or relegation
1	Kungshamns IF	22	14	5	3	39	22	+17	33	Promotion Playoffs – Promoted
2	Trollhättans IF	22	14	2	6	55	24	+31	30	
3	IF Viken, Åmål	22	13	4	5	51	33	+18	30	
4	IK Oddevold, Uddevalla	22	11	3	8	48	26	+22	25	
5	Melleruds IF	22	10	5	7	48	38	+10	25	
6	Säffle FF	22	10	3	9	31	41	−10	23	
7	IFK Uddevalla	22	9	4	9	36	30	+6	22	
8	IFK Kristinehamn	22	8	6	8	35	34	+1	22	
9	Bengtsfors IF	22	4	8	10	22	41	−19	16	
10	Deje IK	22	6	4	12	26	50	−24	16	Relegated
11	SK Sifhälla, Säffle	22	4	3	15	21	46	−25	11	Relegated
12	IFK Sunne	22	4	3	15	27	54	−27	11	Relegated

=== Nordöstra Götaland 1971 ===
Pos	Team	Pld	W	D	L	GF	GA	GD	Pts	Promotion or relegation
1	BK Derby, Linköping	22	17	4	1	65	12	+53	38	Promotion Playoffs – Promoted
2	Finspångs AIK	22	12	6	4	45	21	+24	30	
3	Skärblacka IF	22	10	5	7	41	34	+7	25	
4	IK City, Eskilstuna	22	8	5	9	32	34	−2	21	
5	IF Verdandi, Eskilstuna	22	7	7	8	38	43	−5	21	
6	Hagahöjdens BK, Norrköping	22	5	10	7	24	26	−2	20	
7	BK Kenty, Linköping	22	8	4	10	31	37	−6	20	
8	Motala AIF	22	8	4	10	30	38	−8	20	
9	Flens IF	22	6	8	8	21	29	−8	20	
10	Malmköpings IF	22	7	6	9	16	31	−15	20	Relegated
11	IFK Vreta Kloster	22	5	9	8	24	34	−10	19	Relegated
12	BK Zeros, Motala	22	3	4	15	27	55	−28	10	Relegated

=== Nordvästra Götaland 1971 ===
Pos	Team	Pld	W	D	L	GF	GA	GD	Pts	Promotion or relegation
1	Tidaholms GIF	22	14	6	2	33	10	+23	34	Promotion Playoffs – Promoted
2	Alingsås IF	22	11	7	4	32	17	+15	29	
3	Göteborgs AIK	22	12	4	6	47	21	+26	28	
4	IFK Falköping	22	9	5	8	29	23	+6	23	
5	IF Warta, Göteborg	22	10	3	9	30	29	+1	23	
6	Götene IF	22	8	7	7	34	37	−3	23	
7	Tibro AIK	22	8	4	10	23	28	−5	20	
8	IF Heimer, Lidköping	22	4	10	8	32	33	−1	18	
9	Skogslunds IF, Stora Levene	22	5	8	9	29	36	−7	18	
10	Backa IF	22	5	8	9	29	43	−14	18	Relegated
11	Lundens AIS, Göteborg	22	7	3	12	22	32	−10	17	Relegated
12	Lidköpings IF	22	6	3	13	31	51	−20	15	Relegated

=== Mellersta Götaland 1971 ===
Pos	Team	Pld	W	D	L	GF	GA	GD	Pts	Qualification or relegation
1	Kalmar AIK	22	12	6	4	43	22	+21	30	Promotion Playoffs
2	Växjö BK	22	11	5	6	33	20	+13	27	
3	Emmaboda IS	22	10	6	6	28	16	+12	26	
4	Myresjö IF	22	9	8	5	29	28	+1	26	
5	Husqvarna IF, Huskvarna	22	11	3	8	38	27	+11	25	
6	Tranås BoIS	22	9	4	9	36	31	+5	22	
7	Tranås AIF	22	8	6	8	30	31	−1	22	
8	Liatorps IF	22	9	4	9	37	40	−3	22	
9	IFK Oskarshamn	22	7	7	8	43	39	+4	21	
10	Huskvarna Södra IS	22	5	9	8	20	26	−6	19	Relegated
11	Hvetlanda GIF, Vetlanda	22	7	3	12	27	42	−15	17	Relegated
12	IFK Lammhult	22	3	1	18	21	63	−42	7	Relegated

=== Sydöstra Götaland 1971 ===
Pos	Team	Pld	W	D	L	GF	GA	GD	Pts	Promotion or relegation
1	Hässleholms IF	22	14	4	4	50	30	+20	32	Promotion Playoffs – Promoted
2	Ifö/Bromölla IF	22	14	2	6	49	30	+19	30	
3	IFK Kristianstad	22	12	4	6	44	19	+25	28	
4	Ovesholms IF	22	10	6	6	32	26	+6	26	
5	Högadals IS, Karlshamn	22	9	5	8	38	34	+4	23	
6	Sölvesborgs GIF	22	10	3	9	24	30	−6	23	
7	Jämshögs IF	22	9	3	10	33	27	+6	21	
8	Karlskrona AIF	22	8	5	9	40	41	−1	21	
9	Vilans BoIF, Kristianstad	22	8	4	10	24	35	−11	20	
10	Lyckeby GIF	22	6	5	11	31	40	−9	17	Relegated
11	Kristianstads BI	22	5	5	12	21	43	−22	15	Relegated
12	Tollarps IF	22	2	4	16	24	55	−31	8	Relegated

=== Sydvästra Götaland 1971 ===
Pos	Team	Pld	W	D	L	GF	GA	GD	Pts	Qualification or relegation
1	IFK Ulricehamn	22	13	6	3	54	23	+31	32	Promotion Playoffs
2	Kungsbacka BI	22	11	10	1	30	12	+18	32	
3	Markaryds IF	22	13	3	6	43	24	+19	29	
4	Norrby IF, Borås	22	12	1	9	51	30	+21	25	
5	Skene IF	22	8	6	8	32	30	+2	22	
6	Kinna IF	22	7	8	7	33	32	+1	22	
7	IFK Örby, Kinna	22	6	10	6	31	32	−1	22	
8	Nyhems BK, Halmstad	22	6	7	9	33	43	−10	19	
9	Kullens BK, Göteborg	22	6	7	9	29	39	−10	19	
10	IS Örnia, Halmstad	22	4	8	10	22	33	−11	16	Relegated
11	IFK Värnamo	22	6	2	14	24	55	−31	14	Relegated
12	Svenljunga IK	22	4	4	14	23	52	−29	12	Relegated

=== Skåne 1971 ===
Pos	Team	Pld	W	D	L	GF	GA	GD	Pts	Promotion or relegation
1	IFK Ystad	22	14	4	4	53	29	+24	32	Promotion Playoffs – Promoted
2	Höganäs BK	22	11	6	5	53	50	+3	28	
3	Trelleborgs FF	22	9	8	5	39	18	+21	26	
4	Anderslövs BIK	22	8	8	6	32	32	0	24	
5	Limhamns IF	22	11	2	9	32	34	−2	24	
6	Arlövs BIF	22	10	3	9	44	39	+5	23	
7	IFK Simrishamn	22	8	7	7	39	40	−1	23	
8	Borstahusens BK, Landskrona	22	9	4	9	37	33	+4	22	
9	Lunds BK	22	5	9	8	24	28	−4	19	
10	Råå IF	22	8	3	11	34	44	−10	19	Relegated
11	Kävlinge GIF	22	3	7	12	18	35	−17	13	Relegated
12	Furulunds IK	22	4	3	15	23	46	−23	11	Relegated
