= 1967 Division 3 (Swedish football) =

Swedish League Division 3
- Season: 1967
- Champions: Bodens BK; Gimonäs CK; Frösö IF; Ljusdals IF; Åshammars IK; Råsunda IS; IF Karlskoga/Bofors; IK Sleipner; Tidaholms GIF; IFK Värnamo; Nybro IF; Norrby IF; Åstorps IF
- Promoted: 12 teams above
- Relegated: 35 teams

Statistics of Swedish football Division 3 for the 1967 season.

== League standings ==
=== Norra Norrland, Övre 1967 ===
Pos	Team	Pld	W	D	L	GF	GA	GD	Pts	Promotion or relegation
1	Bodens BK	18	17	0	1	59	20	+39	34	Promoted
2	Storfors Arbetares IK	18	13	1	4	38	13	+25	27	
3	Kebnekaise IK, Kiruna	18	8	3	7	29	24	+5	19	
4	IFK Råneå	18	7	5	6	28	31	−3	19	
5	Överkalix IF	18	6	5	7	26	22	+4	17	
6	Gällivare SK	18	7	2	9	24	28	−4	16	
7	Malmbergets AIF	18	6	4	8	26	35	−9	16	
8	Hornskrokens IF, Boden	18	4	6	8	22	42	−20	14	
9	IFK Kiruna	18	3	5	10	17	32	−15	11	Relegated
10	Vittjärvs IK	18	2	3	13	18	40	−22	7	Relegated

=== Norra Norrland, Nedre 1967 ===
Pos	Team	Pld	W	D	L	GF	GA	GD	Pts	Promotion or relegation
1	Gimonäs CK, Umeå	18	15	1	2	75	16	+59	31	Promoted
2	Norsjö IF	18	8	7	3	46	30	+16	23	
3	Vebomarks IF	18	9	4	5	35	28	+7	22	
4	Myckle IK	18	8	5	5	48	48	0	21	
5	Byske IF	18	8	2	8	34	34	0	18	
6	Rökå IF	18	7	3	8	30	42	−12	17	
7	Lycksele IF	18	7	2	9	36	25	+11	16	
8	IFK Rundvik	18	5	4	9	30	50	−20	14	
9	Sunnanå SK	18	4	4	10	27	41	−14	12	Relegated
10	Obbola IK	18	1	4	13	14	61	−47	6	Relegated

=== Södra Norrland, Övre 1967 ===
Pos	Team	Pld	W	D	L	GF	GA	GD	Pts	Promotion or relegation
1	Frösö IF	18	13	2	3	41	19	+22	28	Promoted
2	Timrå IK	18	12	3	3	42	16	+26	27	
3	Husums IF	18	10	6	2	34	19	+15	26	
4	IFK Östersund	18	10	3	5	40	21	+19	23	
5	Sunds IF, Sundsbruk	18	7	5	6	43	25	+18	19	
6	MoDo AIK, Alfredshem	18	6	5	7	29	37	−8	17	
7	IFK Härnösand	18	7	2	9	32	34	−2	16	
8	Kramfors IF	18	5	3	10	24	31	−7	13	
9	Sollefteå GIF	18	4	2	12	16	44	−28	10	Relegated
10	IFK Strömsund	18	0	1	17	11	66	−55	1	Relegated

=== Södra Norrland, Nedre 1967 ===
Pos	Team	Pld	W	D	L	GF	GA	GD	Pts	Promotion or relegation
1	Ljusdals IF	18	12	2	4	43	19	+24	26	Promoted
2	Strands IF, Hudiksvall	18	8	6	4	54	37	+17	22	
3	Kubikenborgs IF, Sundsvall	18	10	0	8	41	31	+10	20	
4	Alnö IF	18	7	4	7	46	39	+7	18	
5	Bollnäs GIF	18	7	4	7	27	30	−3	18	
6	Svartviks IF	18	6	6	6	27	38	−11	18	
7	Söderhamns IF	18	5	7	6	27	29	−2	17	
8	Essviks AIF	18	7	2	9	25	37	−12	16	
9	Sandarne SIF	18	5	5	8	26	32	−6	15	Relegated
10	Stockviksverkens IF	18	2	6	10	17	41	−24	10	Relegated

=== Norra Svealand 1967 ===
Pos	Team	Pld	W	D	L	GF	GA	GD	Pts	Promotion or relegation
1	Åshammars IK	22	13	4	5	55	35	+20	30	Promoted
2	Årsunda IF	22	11	7	4	40	28	+12	29	
3	IK City, Eskilstuna	22	12	3	7	55	38	+17	27	
4	IFK Västerås	22	11	3	8	55	38	+17	25	
5	Köpings IS	22	12	1	9	46	34	+12	25	
6	Gefle IF, Gävle	22	10	4	8	46	38	+8	24	
7	Skutskärs IF	22	9	5	8	42	37	+5	23	
8	IFK Grängesberg	22	9	5	8	37	43	−6	23	
9	Fagersta AIK	22	7	6	9	56	60	−4	20	
10	IFK Lindesberg	22	4	7	11	38	58	−20	15	Relegated
11	Fagersta Södra IK	22	5	3	14	31	62	−31	13	Relegated
12	Västerås IK	22	3	4	15	24	54	−30	10	Relegated

=== Östra Svealand 1967 ===
Pos	Team	Pld	W	D	L	GF	GA	GD	Pts	Promotion or relegation
1	Råsunda IS, Solna	22	12	7	3	44	24	+20	31	Promoted
2	Älvsjö AIK	22	11	7	4	43	21	+22	29	
3	Gimo IF	22	10	7	5	47	32	+15	27	
4	Edsbro IF	22	9	6	7	26	30	−4	24	
5	Upsala IF, Uppsala	22	8	5	9	39	43	−4	21	
6	Spånga IS	22	9	3	10	36	43	−7	21	
7	Enköpings SK	22	8	4	10	35	34	+1	20	
8	Väsby IK, Upplands-Väsby	22	6	8	8	32	38	−6	20	
9	BK Vargarna, Norrtälje	22	9	1	12	34	44	−10	19	
10	Reymersholms IK, Stockholm	22	7	4	11	26	37	−11	18	Relegated
11	Jakobsbergs GIF	22	7	3	12	39	41	−2	17	Relegated
12	Gustavsbergs IF	22	6	3	13	30	44	−14	15	Relegated

=== Västra Svealand 1967 ===
Pos	Team	Pld	W	D	L	GF	GA	GD	Pts	Promotion or relegation
1	IF Karlskoga/Bofors (KB'63)	22	16	2	4	69	26	+43	34	Promoted
2	SK Sifhälla, Säffle	22	14	5	3	64	35	+29	33	
3	IF Viken, Åmål	22	14	4	4	52	22	+30	32	
4	Melleruds IF	22	13	5	4	58	38	+20	31	
5	BK Forward, Örebro	22	11	4	7	51	40	+11	26	
6	Malungs IF	22	10	3	9	37	37	0	23	
7	Bengtsfors IF	22	9	4	9	43	38	+5	22	
8	Torsby IF	22	7	4	11	45	46	−1	18	
9	IFK Sunne	22	7	3	12	39	59	−20	17	
10	Grums IK	22	6	3	13	33	50	−17	15	Relegated
11	Gullspångs IF	22	1	5	16	27	71	−44	7	Relegated
12	Bergsängs BK	22	2	2	18	25	81	−56	6	Relegated

=== Nordöstra Götaland 1967 ===
Pos	Team	Pld	W	D	L	GF	GA	GD	Pts	Promotion or relegation
1	IK Sleipner, Norrköping	22	17	4	1	78	10	+68	38	Promoted
2	Nyköpings BIS	22	15	3	4	44	23	+21	33	
3	Huskvarna Södra IS	22	12	2	8	54	30	+24	26	
4	Motala AIF	22	11	4	7	46	33	+13	26	
5	Borens IK, Motala	22	11	4	7	33	34	−1	26	
6	Mjölby Södra IF	22	8	7	7	39	29	+10	23	
7	BK Kenty, Linköping	22	11	1	10	33	34	−1	23	
8	Smedby AIS, Norrköping	22	8	3	11	37	45	−8	19	
9	Tranås BoIS	22	8	2	12	24	46	−22	18	
10	Gamleby IF	22	4	4	14	26	64	−38	12	Relegated
11	BK Zeros, Motala	22	4	3	15	22	43	−21	11	Relegated
12	IFK Nyköping	22	3	3	16	29	74	−45	9	Relegated

=== Nordvästra Götaland 1967 ===
Pos	Team	Pld	W	D	L	GF	GA	GD	Pts	Promotion or relegation
1	Tidaholms GIF	22	13	4	5	45	30	+15	30	Promoted
2	Skara IF	22	11	5	6	46	29	+17	27	
3	BK Qviding, Göteborg	22	11	3	8	46	46	0	25	
4	Trollhättans IF	22	9	6	7	38	28	+10	24	
5	IF Heimer, Lidköping	22	9	5	8	39	32	+7	23	
6	Kungshamns IF	22	9	5	8	55	51	+4	23	
7	IK Kongahälla, Kungälv	22	10	3	9	45	48	−3	23	
8	IFK Uddevalla	22	9	5	8	37	40	−3	23	
9	IFK Tidaholm	22	10	3	9	51	41	+10	23	
10	Vänersborgs IF	22	8	5	9	42	38	+4	21	Relegated
11	Göteborgs FF	22	5	3	14	42	72	−30	13	Relegated
12	IFK Trollhättan	22	3	3	16	19	50	−31	9	Relegated

=== Mellersta Götaland 1967 ===
Pos	Team	Pld	W	D	L	GF	GA	GD	Pts	Promotion or relegation
1	IFK Värnamo	22	16	3	3	59	22	+37	35	Promoted
2	Växjö BK	22	15	3	4	67	33	+34	33	
3	IFK Ulricehamn	22	15	2	5	72	33	+39	32	
4	Blomstermåla IK	22	13	4	5	71	27	+44	30	
5	Hultsfreds AIK	22	8	6	8	43	44	−1	22	
6	Nässjö IF	22	7	6	9	41	48	−7	20	
7	Mönsterås GIF	22	7	6	9	42	53	−11	20	
8	Limmareds IF	22	8	4	10	37	50	−13	20	
9	Hvetlanda GIF, Vetlanda	22	8	3	11	38	45	−7	19	
10	IFK Oskarshamn	22	6	2	14	30	65	−35	14	Relegated
11	Waggeryds IK	22	3	4	15	26	70	−44	10	Relegated
12	Anderstorps IF	22	3	3	16	22	58	−36	9	Relegated

=== Sydöstra Götaland 1967 ===
Pos	Team	Pld	W	D	L	GF	GA	GD	Pts	Promotion or relegation
1	Nybro IF	20	15	0	5	62	31	+31	30	Promoted
2	Högadals IS, Karlshamn	20	12	4	4	43	22	+21	28	
3	IFK Hässleholm	20	10	3	7	43	28	+15	23	
4	Tollarps IF	20	9	3	8	43	34	+9	21	
5	Saxemara IF	20	9	2	9	42	44	−2	20	
6	IFK Osby	20	9	2	9	35	41	−6	20	
7	Vilans BoIF, Kristianstad	20	9	1	10	46	46	0	19	
8	Bergkvara AIF	20	5	8	7	34	33	+1	18	
9	Jämshögs IF	20	6	6	8	26	36	−10	18	Relegated
10	Ronneby BK	20	5	2	13	30	51	−21	12	Relegated
11	Lyckeby GIF	20	4	3	13	34	72	−38	11	Relegated

=== Sydvästra Götaland 1967 ===
Pos	Team	Pld	W	D	L	GF	GA	GD	Pts	Promotion or relegation
1	Norrby IF, Borås	22	15	4	3	63	26	+37	34	Promoted
2	Halmstads BK	22	14	3	5	75	25	+50	31	
3	Varbergs GIF	22	12	4	6	48	36	+12	28	
4	Varbergs BoIS	22	10	7	5	43	29	+14	27	
5	Fässbergs IF, Mölndal	22	11	2	9	38	36	+2	24	
6	Kinna IF	22	10	3	9	44	34	+10	23	
7	Kungsbacka IF	22	9	5	8	42	42	0	23	
8	Gerdskens BK, Alingsås	22	6	6	10	35	45	−10	18	
9	Kullens BK, Göteborg	22	6	5	11	36	53	−17	17	
10	IFK Kungsbacka	22	8	1	13	35	55	−20	17	Relegated
11	Morups IF	22	5	3	14	27	61	−34	13	Relegated
12	Överås BK, Göteborg	22	1	7	14	17	61	−44	9	Relegated

=== Skåne 1967 ===
Pos	Team	Pld	W	D	L	GF	GA	GD	Pts	Promotion or relegation
1	Åstorps IF	22	13	6	3	51	22	+29	32	Promoted
2	Limhamns IF	22	13	3	6	39	29	+10	29	
3	GIF Nike, Lomma	22	11	3	8	56	39	+17	25	
4	Malmö BI	22	10	4	8	60	42	+18	24	
5	IK Atleten, Landskrona	22	10	4	8	47	44	+3	24	
6	Perstorps SK	22	9	4	9	48	44	+4	22	
7	Höganäs BK	22	10	2	10	42	42	0	22	
8	Arlövs BIF	22	11	0	11	39	43	−4	22	
9	Råå IF	22	9	3	10	38	37	+1	21	
10	Högaborgs BK, Hälsingborg	22	9	3	10	38	44	−6	21	Relegated
11	Tomelilla IF	22	7	2	13	35	58	−23	16	Relegated
12	Klippans BIF	22	2	2	18	41	90	−49	6	Relegated
