= 1963 Division 3 (Swedish football) =

Swedish League Division 3
- Season: 1963
- Champions: Luleå SK; IFK Östersund; Gefle IF; Västerås IK; Råsunda IS; Karlstads BIK; Nyköpings AIK; Billingsfors IK; Gnosjö IF; IFK Karlshamn; Grimsås IF; IFK Ystad
- Promoted: 12 teams above
- Relegated: 36 teams

Statistics of Swedish football Division 3 for the 1963 season.

== League standings ==
=== Norra Norrland 1963 ===
| Pos | Team | Pld | W | D | L | GF | GA | GD | Pts | Promotion or relegation |
|---|---|---|---|---|---|---|---|---|---|---|
| 1 | Luleå SK | 20 | 13 | 4 | 3 | 60 | 32 | +28 | 30 | Promoted |
| 2 | Sunnanå SK | 20 | 11 | 3 | 6 | 42 | 24 | +18 | 25 | |
| 3 | Storfors Arbetares IK | 20 | 9 | 6 | 5 | 50 | 37 | +13 | 24 | |
| 4 | IFK Kalix | 20 | 11 | 2 | 7 | 33 | 31 | +2 | 24 | |
| 5 | Malmbergets AIF | 20 | 8 | 7 | 5 | 40 | 33 | +7 | 23 | |
| 6 | Överkalix IF | 20 | 8 | 3 | 9 | 26 | 37 | −11 | 19 | |
| 7 | Bodens BK | 20 | 6 | 5 | 9 | 37 | 38 | −1 | 17 | |
| 8 | Kebnekaise IK, Kiruna | 20 | 7 | 2 | 11 | 23 | 35 | −12 | 16 | |
| 9 | Myckle IK | 20 | 6 | 3 | 11 | 34 | 47 | −13 | 15 | Relegated |
| 10 | Vistträsks IF | 20 | 6 | 3 | 11 | 26 | 44 | −18 | 15 | Relegated |
| 11 | Skellefteå IF | 20 | 4 | 4 | 12 | 30 | 43 | −13 | 12 | Relegated |

=== Mellersta Norrland 1963 ===
| Pos | Team | Pld | W | D | L | GF | GA | GD | Pts | Promotion or relegation |
|---|---|---|---|---|---|---|---|---|---|---|
| 1 | IFK Östersund | 16 | 13 | 2 | 1 | 48 | 11 | +37 | 28 | Promoted |
| 2 | IF Friska Viljor, Örnsköldsvik | 16 | 9 | 3 | 4 | 40 | 11 | +29 | 21 | |
| 3 | Sollefteå GIF | 16 | 7 | 5 | 4 | 23 | 30 | −7 | 19 | |
| 4 | Vännäs AIK | 16 | 7 | 4 | 5 | 34 | 31 | +3 | 18 | |
| 5 | Sandviks IK, Holmsund | 16 | 6 | 4 | 6 | 31 | 28 | +3 | 16 | |
| 6 | Kramfors IF | 16 | 6 | 3 | 7 | 34 | 35 | −1 | 15 | |
| 7 | Köpmanholmens IF | 16 | 6 | 3 | 7 | 21 | 26 | −5 | 15 | Relegated |
| 8 | Ope IF | 16 | 2 | 3 | 11 | 13 | 43 | −30 | 7 | Relegated |
| 9 | IFK Umeå | 16 | 0 | 5 | 11 | 14 | 44 | −30 | 5 | Relegated |

=== Södra Norrland 1963 ===
| Pos | Team | Pld | W | D | L | GF | GA | GD | Pts | Promotion or relegation |
|---|---|---|---|---|---|---|---|---|---|---|
| 1 | Gefle IF, Gävle | 22 | 17 | 3 | 2 | 74 | 20 | +54 | 37 | Promoted |
| 2 | Skönvik/Sunds IF | 22 | 14 | 2 | 6 | 55 | 38 | +17 | 30 | |
| 3 | IF Älgarna, Hrnsand | 22 | 12 | 2 | 8 | 63 | 46 | +17 | 26 | |
| 4 | Kubikenborgs IF, Sundsvall | 22 | 11 | 4 | 7 | 31 | 30 | +1 | 26 | |
| 5 | Wifsta/Östrands IF, Timrå | 22 | 10 | 5 | 7 | 50 | 41 | +9 | 25 | |
| 6 | Arbrå BK | 22 | 8 | 6 | 8 | 40 | 40 | 0 | 22 | |
| 7 | Brynäs IF, Gävle | 22 | 7 | 6 | 9 | 45 | 39 | +6 | 20 | |
| 8 | Ljusdals IF | 22 | 9 | 2 | 11 | 56 | 55 | +1 | 20 | |
| 9 | Sandarne SIF | 22 | 7 | 6 | 9 | 34 | 36 | −2 | 20 | |
| 10 | Essviks AIF | 22 | 6 | 6 | 10 | 41 | 68 | −27 | 18 | Relegated |
| 11 | Edsbyns IF | 22 | 3 | 5 | 14 | 27 | 53 | −26 | 11 | Relegated |
| 12 | Marma IF | 22 | 3 | 3 | 16 | 28 | 78 | −50 | 9 | Relegated |

=== Norra Svealand 1963 ===
| Pos | Team | Pld | W | D | L | GF | GA | GD | Pts | Promotion or relegation |
|---|---|---|---|---|---|---|---|---|---|---|
| 1 | Västerås IK | 22 | 16 | 2 | 4 | 59 | 27 | +32 | 34 | Promoted |
| 2 | Västerås SK | 22 | 13 | 5 | 4 | 49 | 28 | +21 | 31 | |
| 3 | Köpings IS | 22 | 10 | 6 | 6 | 44 | 29 | +15 | 26 | |
| 4 | Fagersta AIK | 22 | 9 | 8 | 5 | 35 | 35 | 0 | 26 | |
| 5 | Vansbro AIK | 22 | 10 | 3 | 9 | 54 | 44 | +10 | 23 | |
| 6 | Säters IF | 22 | 10 | 3 | 9 | 43 | 43 | 0 | 23 | |
| 7 | IFK Västerås | 22 | 10 | 1 | 11 | 47 | 37 | +10 | 21 | |
| 8 | BK Forward, Örebro | 22 | 7 | 6 | 9 | 34 | 43 | −9 | 20 | |
| 9 | Rynninge IK, Örebro | 22 | 7 | 6 | 9 | 36 | 47 | −11 | 20 | |
| 10 | Hofors AIF | 22 | 6 | 6 | 10 | 33 | 48 | −15 | 18 | Relegated |
| 11 | Ludvika FFI | 22 | 5 | 5 | 12 | 34 | 44 | −10 | 15 | Relegated |
| 12 | IFK Grängesberg | 22 | 2 | 3 | 17 | 34 | 77 | −43 | 7 | Relegated |

=== Östra Svealand 1963 ===
| Pos | Team | Pld | W | D | L | GF | GA | GD | Pts | Promotion or relegation |
|---|---|---|---|---|---|---|---|---|---|---|
| 1 | Råsunda IS, Solna | 22 | 15 | 4 | 3 | 56 | 26 | +30 | 34 | Promoted |
| 2 | Gustavsbergs IF | 22 | 12 | 4 | 6 | 44 | 30 | +14 | 28 | |
| 3 | Malmköpings IF | 22 | 12 | 2 | 8 | 43 | 27 | +16 | 26 | |
| 4 | IK Sirius, Uppsala | 22 | 10 | 3 | 9 | 42 | 39 | +3 | 23 | |
| 5 | BK Vargarna, Norrtälje | 22 | 10 | 3 | 9 | 38 | 37 | +1 | 23 | |
| 6 | IK Tellus, Stockholm | 22 | 7 | 8 | 7 | 50 | 40 | +10 | 22 | |
| 7 | Huvudsta IS, Solna | 22 | 10 | 2 | 10 | 32 | 36 | −4 | 22 | |
| 8 | Södertälje SK | 22 | 8 | 5 | 9 | 41 | 48 | −7 | 21 | |
| 9 | Hälleforsnäs IF | 22 | 7 | 6 | 9 | 41 | 38 | +3 | 20 | |
| 10 | Reymersholms IK, Stockholm | 22 | 6 | 4 | 12 | 31 | 48 | −17 | 16 | Relegated |
| 11 | Rimbo IF | 22 | 5 | 5 | 12 | 35 | 60 | −25 | 15 | Relegated |
| 12 | Enskede IK | 22 | 5 | 4 | 13 | 34 | 58 | −24 | 14 | Relegated |

=== Västra Svealand 1963 ===
| Pos | Team | Pld | W | D | L | GF | GA | GD | Pts | Promotion or relegation |
|---|---|---|---|---|---|---|---|---|---|---|
| 1 | Karlstads BIK | 22 | 12 | 5 | 5 | 54 | 34 | +20 | 29 | Promoted |
| 2 | IFK Arvika | 22 | 12 | 2 | 8 | 51 | 29 | +22 | 26 | |
| 3 | Gullspångs IF | 22 | 11 | 4 | 7 | 64 | 44 | +20 | 26 | |
| 4 | Hillringsbergs IF, Glava | 22 | 10 | 4 | 8 | 50 | 45 | +5 | 24 | |
| 5 | Storfors FF | 22 | 10 | 4 | 8 | 55 | 58 | −3 | 24 | |
| 6 | Laxå IF | 22 | 9 | 4 | 9 | 54 | 46 | +8 | 22 | |
| 7 | IF Viken, Åmål | 22 | 7 | 8 | 7 | 37 | 33 | +4 | 22 | |
| 8 | Fiskeviks IF, Ottebol | 22 | 8 | 5 | 9 | 44 | 51 | −7 | 21 | |
| 9 | Karlskoga IF | 22 | 7 | 7 | 8 | 39 | 49 | −10 | 21 | |
| 10 | IFK Bofors | 22 | 9 | 2 | 11 | 52 | 50 | +2 | 20 | Relegated (see the note) |
| 11 | Karlstads FF | 22 | 6 | 4 | 12 | 41 | 54 | −13 | 16 | Relegated (see the note) |
| 12 | IK Viking, Hagfors | 22 | 6 | 1 | 15 | 32 | 80 | −48 | 13 | Relegated |

=== Nordöstra Götaland 1963 ===
| Pos | Team | Pld | W | D | L | GF | GA | GD | Pts | Promotion or relegation |
|---|---|---|---|---|---|---|---|---|---|---|
| 1 | Nyköpings AIK | 22 | 15 | 4 | 3 | 71 | 28 | +43 | 34 | Promoted |
| 2 | Katrineholms SK | 22 | 13 | 3 | 6 | 42 | 28 | +14 | 29 | |
| 3 | IF Sylvia, Norrköping | 22 | 12 | 4 | 6 | 44 | 32 | +12 | 28 | |
| 4 | BK Kenty, Norrköping | 22 | 11 | 2 | 9 | 53 | 51 | +2 | 24 | |
| 5 | IK Sleipner, Norrköping | 22 | 10 | 3 | 9 | 39 | 31 | +8 | 23 | |
| 6 | IFK Nyköping | 22 | 9 | 3 | 10 | 37 | 52 | −15 | 21 | |
| 7 | IFK Motala | 22 | 7 | 6 | 9 | 38 | 36 | +2 | 20 | |
| 8 | Tranås BoIS | 22 | 8 | 4 | 10 | 42 | 45 | −3 | 20 | |
| 9 | BK Hird, Norrköping | 22 | 7 | 6 | 9 | 40 | 48 | −8 | 20 | |
| 10 | Finspångs AIK | 22 | 8 | 3 | 11 | 33 | 31 | +2 | 19 | Relegated |
| 11 | Nyköpings SK | 22 | 4 | 6 | 12 | 31 | 55 | −24 | 14 | Relegated |
| 12 | Mjölby AIF | 22 | 5 | 2 | 15 | 27 | 60 | −33 | 12 | Relegated |

=== Nordvästra Götaland 1963 ===
| Pos | Team | Pld | W | D | L | GF | GA | GD | Pts | Promotion or relegation |
|---|---|---|---|---|---|---|---|---|---|---|
| 1 | Billingsfors IK | 22 | 17 | 2 | 3 | 64 | 28 | +36 | 36 | Promoted |
| 2 | Kullens BK, Göteborg | 22 | 12 | 3 | 7 | 54 | 37 | +17 | 27 | |
| 3 | Håfreströms IF | 22 | 12 | 3 | 7 | 67 | 51 | +16 | 27 | |
| 4 | Skogens IF, Göteborg | 22 | 12 | 3 | 7 | 42 | 36 | +6 | 27 | |
| 5 | BK Häcken, Göteborg | 22 | 12 | 2 | 8 | 46 | 26 | +20 | 26 | |
| 6 | Älvängens IK | 22 | 9 | 5 | 8 | 32 | 28 | +4 | 23 | |
| 7 | Gteborgs AIK | 22 | 10 | 1 | 11 | 59 | 56 | +3 | 21 | |
| 8 | Kungshamns IF | 22 | 8 | 5 | 9 | 48 | 46 | +2 | 21 | |
| 9 | Vänersborgs IF | 22 | 7 | 5 | 10 | 39 | 36 | +3 | 19 | |
| 10 | IFK Uddevalla | 22 | 5 | 8 | 9 | 24 | 40 | −16 | 18 | Relegated |
| 11 | Marieholms BIK, Göteborg | 22 | 4 | 3 | 15 | 21 | 82 | −61 | 11 | Relegated |
| 12 | Lundens AIS, Göteborg | 22 | 2 | 4 | 16 | 23 | 53 | −30 | 8 | Relegated |

=== Mellersta Götaland 1963 ===
| Pos | Team | Pld | W | D | L | GF | GA | GD | Pts | Promotion or relegation |
|---|---|---|---|---|---|---|---|---|---|---|
| 1 | Gnosjö IF | 22 | 15 | 1 | 6 | 85 | 32 | +53 | 31 | Promoted |
| 2 | Waggeryds IK | 22 | 15 | 1 | 6 | 77 | 43 | +34 | 31 | |
| 3 | Falkenbergs FF | 22 | 12 | 5 | 5 | 61 | 43 | +18 | 29 | |
| 4 | IFK Oskarshamn | 22 | 10 | 2 | 10 | 53 | 48 | +5 | 22 | |
| 5 | IF Hallby, Jönköping | 22 | 10 | 2 | 10 | 42 | 50 | −8 | 22 | |
| 6 | IK Tord, Jönköping | 22 | 10 | 2 | 10 | 46 | 58 | −12 | 22 | |
| 7 | Gislaveds IS | 22 | 10 | 1 | 11 | 41 | 49 | −8 | 21 | |
| 8 | Strömsnäsbruks IF | 22 | 8 | 4 | 10 | 50 | 47 | +3 | 20 | |
| 9 | Morups IF | 22 | 9 | 2 | 11 | 35 | 43 | −8 | 20 | |
| 10 | Nässjö IF | 22 | 8 | 4 | 10 | 39 | 61 | −22 | 20 | Relegated |
| 11 | Huskvarna Södra IS | 22 | 7 | 2 | 13 | 35 | 50 | −15 | 16 | Relegated |
| 12 | Hultsfreds AIK | 22 | 4 | 2 | 16 | 43 | 83 | −40 | 10 | Relegated |

=== Sydöstra Götaland 1963 ===
| Pos | Team | Pld | W | D | L | GF | GA | GD | Pts | Promotion or relegation |
|---|---|---|---|---|---|---|---|---|---|---|
| 1 | IFK Karlshamn | 22 | 16 | 2 | 4 | 61 | 30 | +31 | 34 | Promoted |
| 2 | Hässleholms IF | 22 | 13 | 4 | 5 | 45 | 20 | +25 | 30 | |
| 3 | Kalmar AIK | 22 | 8 | 8 | 6 | 41 | 29 | +12 | 24 | |
| 4 | Nybro IF | 22 | 10 | 4 | 8 | 43 | 43 | 0 | 24 | |
| 5 | Ronneby BK | 22 | 7 | 8 | 7 | 41 | 38 | +3 | 22 | |
| 6 | Perstorps SK | 22 | 9 | 4 | 9 | 48 | 50 | −2 | 22 | |
| 7 | Hörvikens IF | 22 | 11 | 0 | 11 | 39 | 52 | −13 | 22 | |
| 8 | Kristianstads BIF | 22 | 6 | 9 | 7 | 30 | 29 | +1 | 21 | |
| 9 | Olofströms IF | 22 | 8 | 4 | 10 | 41 | 46 | −5 | 20 | |
| 10 | Vilans BoIF, Kristianstad | 22 | 6 | 6 | 10 | 41 | 48 | −7 | 18 | Relegated |
| 11 | IFK Hässleholm | 22 | 6 | 2 | 14 | 27 | 51 | −24 | 14 | Relegated |
| 12 | IF Trion, Spjutsbygd | 22 | 5 | 3 | 14 | 32 | 53 | −21 | 13 | Relegated |

=== Sydvästra Götaland 1963 ===
| Pos | Team | Pld | W | D | L | GF | GA | GD | Pts | Promotion or relegation |
|---|---|---|---|---|---|---|---|---|---|---|
| 1 | Grimsås IF | 22 | 15 | 3 | 4 | 47 | 17 | +30 | 33 | Promoted |
| 2 | Alingsås IF | 22 | 15 | 3 | 4 | 45 | 23 | +22 | 33 | |
| 3 | Fässbergs IF, Mölndal | 22 | 10 | 6 | 6 | 39 | 29 | +10 | 26 | |
| 4 | Jonsereds IF | 22 | 11 | 4 | 7 | 48 | 40 | +8 | 26 | |
| 5 | Viskafors IF | 22 | 10 | 4 | 8 | 54 | 48 | +6 | 24 | |
| 6 | Limmareds IF | 22 | 9 | 5 | 8 | 35 | 36 | −1 | 23 | |
| 7 | Tidaholms GIF | 22 | 9 | 5 | 8 | 29 | 31 | −2 | 23 | |
| 8 | Tranemo IF | 22 | 9 | 3 | 10 | 39 | 34 | +5 | 21 | |
| 9 | Skara IF | 22 | 6 | 4 | 12 | 28 | 33 | −5 | 16 | |
| 10 | IFK Örby, Kinna | 22 | 4 | 7 | 11 | 26 | 38 | −12 | 15 | Relegated |
| 11 | Tibro AIK | 22 | 5 | 3 | 14 | 23 | 50 | −27 | 13 | Relegated |
| 12 | Hovås IF | 22 | 4 | 3 | 15 | 34 | 68 | −34 | 11 | Relegated |

=== Södra Götaland 1963 ===
| Pos | Team | Pld | W | D | L | GF | GA | GD | Pts | Promotion or relegation |
|---|---|---|---|---|---|---|---|---|---|---|
| 1 | IFK Ystad | 22 | 16 | 3 | 3 | 58 | 18 | +40 | 35 | Promoted |
| 2 | Råå IF | 22 | 14 | 2 | 6 | 36 | 23 | +13 | 30 | |
| 3 | GIF Nike, Lomma | 22 | 11 | 4 | 7 | 53 | 36 | +17 | 26 | |
| 4 | Tomelilla IF | 22 | 12 | 1 | 9 | 50 | 37 | +13 | 25 | |
| 5 | Lunds BK | 22 | 11 | 3 | 8 | 49 | 38 | +11 | 25 | |
| 6 | Billesholms GIF | 22 | 10 | 3 | 9 | 40 | 39 | +1 | 23 | |
| 7 | Limhamns IF | 22 | 8 | 5 | 9 | 40 | 44 | −4 | 21 | |
| 8 | Eslövs IK | 22 | 7 | 6 | 9 | 39 | 41 | −2 | 20 | |
| 9 | Ystads IF | 22 | 9 | 2 | 11 | 47 | 52 | −5 | 20 | |
| 10 | IK Atleten, Landskrona | 22 | 5 | 4 | 13 | 34 | 54 | −20 | 14 | Relegated |
| 11 | IF Allians, Malmö | 22 | 5 | 3 | 14 | 29 | 52 | −23 | 13 | Relegated |
| 12 | BK Drott, Hälsingborg | 22 | 5 | 2 | 15 | 40 | 81 | −41 | 12 | Relegated |
