= 1961 Division 3 (Swedish football) =

Swedish League Division 3
- Season: 1961
- Champions: Skellefteå IF; Gimonäs CK; Söderhamns IF; Sandvikens AIK; IK Sirius; IFK Kumla; IK Sleipner; Redbergslids IK; Tidaholms GIF; Saltö BK; Varbergs BoIS; Tomelilla IF
- Promoted: 12 teams above
- Relegated: 35 teams

Statistics of Swedish football Division 3 for the 1961 season.

== League standings ==
=== Norra Norrland 1961 ===
Pos	Team	Pld	W	D	L	GF	GA	GD	Pts	Promotion or relegation
1	Skellefteå IF	18	11	3	4	55	27	+28	25	Promoted
2	Storfors Arbetares IK	18	9	5	4	37	30	+7	23	
3	Malmbergets AIF	18	9	3	6	40	32	+8	21	
4	Myckle IK	18	10	1	7	49	51	−2	21	
5	Luleå SK	18	8	3	7	40	40	0	19	
6	Norsjö IF	18	7	4	7	53	42	+11	18	
7	Överkalix IF	18	4	6	8	35	39	−4	14	
8	Sorsele IF	18	6	1	11	33	45	−12	13	Relegated
9	Piteå IF	18	5	3	10	33	48	−15	13	Relegated
10	Sunnanå SK	18	6	1	11	31	52	−21	13	Relegated

=== Mellersta Norrland 1961 ===
Pos	Team	Pld	W	D	L	GF	GA	GD	Pts	Promotion or relegation
1	Gimonäs CK, Umeå	18	13	3	2	50	18	+32	29	Promoted
2	IF Älgarna, Härnösand	18	10	5	3	41	17	+24	25	
3	Sandåkerns SK, Umeå	18	10	0	8	43	29	+14	20	
4	Sandviks IK, Holmsund	18	9	2	7	36	23	+13	20	
5	IFK Umeå	18	8	3	7	28	20	+8	19	
6	Alfedshems IK	18	7	4	7	19	20	−1	18	
7	Köpmanholmens IF	18	7	4	7	31	34	−3	18	
8	Domsjö IF	18	4	5	9	26	40	−14	13	Relegated
9	IFK Härnösand	18	4	1	13	24	51	−27	9	Relegated
10	Husums IF	18	4	1	13	23	60	−37	9	Relegated

=== Södra Norrland 1961 ===
Pos	Team	Pld	W	D	L	GF	GA	GD	Pts	Promotion or relegation
1	Söderhamns IF	22	13	4	5	62	33	+29	30	Promoted
2	Kubikenborgs IF, Sundsvall	22	10	8	4	41	21	+20	28	
3	Bollnäs GIF	22	12	3	7	50	31	+19	27	
4	Edsbyns IF	22	12	3	7	54	37	+17	27	
5	Matfors IF	22	11	3	8	31	27	+4	25	
6	Ljusdals IF	22	11	2	9	43	37	+6	24	
7	Wifsta/Östrands IF	22	7	8	7	23	27	−4	22	
8	Fagerviks GF, Timrå	22	10	1	11	48	47	+1	21	
9	Marma IF	22	8	4	10	33	31	+2	20	
10	Ljusne AIK	22	7	5	10	44	51	−7	19	
11	Ljunga IF, Ljungaverk	22	7	3	12	34	57	−23	17	Relegated
12	Bergs IK, Svenstavik	22	1	2	19	19	83	−64	4	Relegated

=== Norra Svealand 1961 ===
Pos	Team	Pld	W	D	L	GF	GA	GD	Pts	Promotion or relegation
1	Sandvikens AIK	22	18	3	1	61	13	+48	39	Promoted
2	Hofors AIF	22	13	3	6	42	31	+11	29	
3	Fagersta AIK	22	12	4	6	48	30	+18	28	
4	Västerås SK	22	10	5	7	45	28	+17	25	
5	Islingby IK, Borlänge	22	9	5	8	41	32	+9	23	
6	IFK Grängesberg	22	8	6	8	34	36	−2	22	
7	Högbo AIK, Sandviken	22	10	1	11	36	35	+1	21	
8	Skutskärs IF	22	8	5	9	36	41	−5	21	
9	Vansbro AIK	22	8	4	10	42	59	−17	20	
10	Nusnäs IF	22	7	3	12	32	58	−26	17	Relegated
11	IF Rune, Kungsör	22	4	6	12	28	50	−22	14	Relegated
12	Malungs IF	22	1	3	18	23	55	−32	5	Relegated

=== Östra Svealand 1961 ===
Pos	Team	Pld	W	D	L	GF	GA	GD	Pts	Promotion or relegation
1	IK Sirius, Uppsala	22	15	2	5	61	25	+36	32	Promoted
2	Upsala IF, Uppsala	22	14	0	8	46	30	+16	28	
3	Råsunda IS, Solna	22	11	4	7	59	38	+21	26	
4	Hälleforsnäs IF	22	12	1	9	61	50	+11	25	
5	Rimbo IF	22	10	3	9	49	42	+7	23	
6	Enskede IK	22	10	3	9	57	55	+2	23	
7	Södertälje SK	22	11	1	10	49	51	−2	23	
8	IK Tellus, Stockholm	22	9	3	10	43	50	−7	21	
9	Malmköpings IF	22	8	3	11	46	53	−7	19	
10	IF Gute, Visby	22	6	3	13	43	67	−24	15	Relegated
11	IF Vesta, Uppsala	22	6	3	13	34	65	−31	15	Relegated
12	Karlbergs BK, Stockholm	22	5	4	13	40	62	−22	14	Relegated

=== Västra Svealand 1961 ===
Pos	Team	Pld	W	D	L	GF	GA	GD	Pts	Promotion or relegation
1	IFK Kumla	22	19	1	2	90	19	+71	39	Promoted
2	IFK Kristinehamn	22	13	6	3	61	29	+32	32	
3	Fiskeviks IF, Ottebol	22	12	4	6	57	43	+14	28	
4	Rynninge IK, Örebro	22	9	9	4	48	41	+7	27	
5	Karlskoga IF	22	12	2	8	49	44	+5	26	
6	IFK Bofors	22	9	5	8	39	52	−13	23	
7	Karlstads FF	22	8	4	10	52	49	+3	20	
8	Vretstorps IF	22	7	4	11	35	54	−19	18	
9	Arvika BK	22	6	5	11	32	34	−2	17	
10	Arvika FF	22	6	1	15	35	61	−26	13	Relegated
11	IFK Hallsberg	22	5	2	15	31	56	−25	12	Relegated
12	Skattkärrs IF	22	3	3	16	23	70	−47	9	Relegated

=== Nordöstra Götaland 1961 ===
Pos	Team	Pld	W	D	L	GF	GA	GD	Pts	Promotion or relegation
1	IK Sleipner, Norrköping	22	15	5	2	61	18	+43	35	Promoted
2	Tranås BoIS	22	13	3	6	52	41	+11	29	
3	BK Kenty, Linköping	22	11	5	6	50	36	+14	27	
4	Västerviks AIS	22	11	1	10	55	51	+4	23	
5	Nyköpings AIK	22	9	4	9	38	40	−2	22	
6	Gamleby IF	22	9	4	9	40	48	−8	22	
7	Katrineholms SK	22	9	3	10	42	43	−1	21	
8	IK Waria, Norrköping	22	7	6	9	39	47	−8	20	
9	Finspångs AIK	22	8	2	12	47	50	−3	18	
10	Mjölby Södra IF	22	5	6	11	34	46	−12	16	Relegated
11	Skärblacka IF	22	6	4	12	27	40	−13	16	Relegated
12	Smedby AIS, Norrköping	22	4	7	11	31	56	−25	15	Relegated

=== Nordvästra Götaland 1961 ===
Pos	Team	Pld	W	D	L	GF	GA	GD	Pts	Promotion or relegation
1	Redbergslids IK, Göteborg	22	16	2	4	72	38	+34	34	Promoted
2	Västra Frölunda IF	22	15	3	4	83	37	+46	33	
3	Skogens IF, Göteborg	22	13	5	4	61	36	+25	31	
4	Jonsereds IF	22	12	2	8	75	57	+18	26	
5	Håfreströms IF	22	10	4	8	72	53	+19	24	
6	IF Viken, Åmål	22	10	2	10	47	44	+3	22	
7	Kullens BK, Göteborg	22	8	5	9	37	37	0	21	
8	Marieholms BIK, Göteborg	22	8	4	10	36	56	−20	20	
9	BK Häcken, Göteborg	22	8	2	12	52	54	−2	18	
10	Göteborgs FF	22	7	2	13	42	64	−22	16	Relegated
11	Grundsunds IF	22	3	5	14	24	67	−43	11	Relegated
12	Burås IF, Göteborg	22	3	2	17	29	87	−58	8	Relegated

=== Mellersta Götaland 1961 ===
Pos	Team	Pld	W	D	L	GF	GA	GD	Pts	Promotion or relegation
1	Tidaholms GIF	22	18	1	3	88	41	+47	37	Promoted
2	IK Tord, Jönköping	22	14	6	2	84	38	+46	34	
3	Waggeryds IK	22	13	2	7	66	42	+24	28	
4	Bankeryds SK	22	11	1	10	64	66	−2	23	
5	Vänersborgs IF	22	8	6	8	45	35	+10	22	
6	IFK Trollhättan	22	10	2	10	61	53	+8	22	
7	Tibro AIK	22	8	5	9	34	36	−2	21	
8	Skara IF	22	6	7	9	49	54	−5	19	
9	Trollhättans IF	22	7	3	12	30	41	−11	17	
10	IF Hallby, Jönköping	22	8	1	13	44	66	−22	17	Relegated
11	IF Heimer, Lidköping	22	7	2	13	30	59	−29	16	Relegated
12	Gullspångs IF	22	3	2	17	37	101	−64	8	Relegated

=== Sydöstra Götaland 1961 ===
Pos	Team	Pld	W	D	L	GF	GA	GD	Pts	Promotion or relegation
1	Saltö BK, Karlskrona	22	17	4	1	78	31	+47	38	Promoted
2	Oskarshamns AIK	22	16	4	2	70	21	+49	36	
3	IFK Hässleholm	22	13	3	6	52	44	+8	29	
4	Ronneby BK	22	12	2	8	53	46	+7	26	
5	Kristianstads BIF	22	12	1	9	39	36	+3	25	
6	IFK Karlshamn	22	10	3	9	36	33	+3	23	
7	Olofströms IF	22	8	4	10	46	42	+4	20	
8	Svängsta IF	22	7	3	12	32	63	−31	17	
9	Mjällby AIF	22	5	5	12	33	46	−13	15	
10	Timmernabbens IF	22	4	6	12	30	46	−16	14	Relegated
11	Lessebo GIF	22	4	3	15	32	65	−33	11	Relegated
12	Tollarps IF	22	3	4	15	30	58	−28	10	Relegated

=== Sydvästra Götaland 1961 ===
Pos	Team	Pld	W	D	L	GF	GA	GD	Pts	Promotion or relegation
1	Varbergs BoIS	22	15	6	1	65	17	+48	36	Promoted
2	Gnosjö IF	22	14	3	5	69	36	+33	31	
3	IFK Värnamo	22	13	3	6	59	44	+15	29	
4	Grimsås IF	22	12	4	6	53	50	+3	28	
5	Gislaveds IS	22	9	4	9	58	58	0	22	
6	Tranemo IF	22	7	7	8	42	34	+8	21	
7	Viskafors IF	22	8	4	10	51	39	+12	20	
8	Kinna IF	22	8	4	10	40	46	−6	20	
9	Skene IF	22	9	1	12	40	69	−29	19	
10	Strömsnäsbruks IF	22	6	5	11	42	46	−4	17	Relegated
11	Växjö Norra IF	22	6	2	14	32	67	−35	14	Relegated
12	Trönninge IF	22	3	1	18	34	79	−45	7	Relegated

=== Södra Götaland 1961 ===
Pos	Team	Pld	W	D	L	GF	GA	GD	Pts	Promotion or relegation
1	Tomelilla IF	22	15	4	3	64	29	+35	34	Promoted
2	Billesholms GIF	22	13	5	4	45	25	+20	31	
3	IFK Ystad	22	11	3	8	55	40	+15	25	
4	Högaborgs BK, Hälsingborg	22	10	4	8	52	43	+9	24	
5	IF Allians, Malmö	22	8	7	7	37	39	−2	23	
6	Lunds BK	22	8	5	9	41	37	+4	21	
7	Perstorps SK	22	9	3	10	49	53	−4	21	
8	Höganäs BK	22	7	7	8	35	39	−4	21	
9	Eslövs BK	22	7	6	9	36	36	0	20	
10	Ängelholms IF	22	9	0	13	40	54	−14	18	Relegated
11	Arlövs BoIF	22	6	3	13	36	64	−28	15	Relegated
12	Skillinge IF	22	4	3	15	33	64	−31	11	Relegated
