= 1970 Division 2 (Swedish football) =

Swedish League Division 2
- Season: 1970
- Champions: IFK Luleå; Sandvikens IF; Skövde AIK; Landskrona BoIS
- Promoted: Landskrona BoIS; IFK Luleå
- Relegated: IFK Östersund; IFK Härnösand; Essviks AIF; Köpings IS; Malungs IF; IK City; Norrby IF; IFK Värnamo; Tidaholms GIF; IFK Ystad; Hässleholms IF; IFÖ/Bromölla IF

Statistics of Swedish football Division 2 for the 1970 season.

== League standings ==
=== Norrland ===
Pos	Team	Pld	W	D	L	GF	GA	GD	Pts	Qualification or relegation
1	IFK Luleå	22	17	3	2	43	14	+29	37	Playoffs for promotion to Allsvenskan
2	Sandåkerns SK	22	14	2	6	33	21	+12	30	
3	GIF Sundsvall	22	13	3	6	40	28	+12	29	
4	IFK Holmsund	22	12	4	6	32	16	+16	28	
5	Brynäs IF	22	12	3	7	51	24	+27	27	
6	Skellefteå AIK	22	9	7	6	34	26	+8	25	
7	Domsjö IF	22	6	8	8	24	27	−3	20	
8	Lycksele IF	22	5	6	11	23	28	−5	16	
9	Ljusdals IF	22	4	8	10	18	32	−14	16	
10	IFK Östersund	22	4	5	13	24	51	−27	13	Relegation to Division 3
11	IFK Härnösand	22	5	2	15	24	43	−19	12	Relegation to Division 3
12	Essviks AIF	22	4	3	15	19	55	−36	11	Relegation to Division 3

=== Svealand ===
Pos	Team	Pld	W	D	L	GF	GA	GD	Pts	Qualification or relegation
1	Sandvikens IF	22	13	8	1	42	11	+31	34	Playoffs for promotion to Allsvenskan
2	IK Sirius	22	12	8	2	37	18	+19	32	
3	IK Brage	22	12	1	9	39	35	+4	25	
4	IFK Stockholm	22	8	8	6	26	27	−1	24	
5	IFK Eskilstuna	22	9	4	9	28	25	+3	22	
6	IK Sleipner	22	8	6	8	28	25	+3	22	
7	IF Brommapojkarna	22	9	3	10	35	35	0	21	
8	Älvsjö AIK	22	8	4	10	27	31	−4	20	
9	Södertälje SK	22	8	3	11	20	36	−16	19	
10	Köpings IS	22	6	5	11	26	35	−9	17	Relegation to Division 3
11	Malungs IF	22	5	6	11	24	32	−8	16	Relegation to Division 3
12	IK City	22	3	6	13	18	40	−22	12	Relegation to Division 3

=== Norra Götaland ===
Pos	Team	Pld	W	D	L	GF	GA	GD	Pts	Qualification or relegation
1	Skövde AIK	22	15	5	2	42	13	+29	35	Playoffs for promotion to Allsvenskan
2	KB Karlskoga	22	15	2	5	39	21	+18	32	
3	IF Saab	22	12	5	5	51	25	+26	29	
4	Jönköpings Södra IF	22	13	3	6	48	26	+22	29	
5	Västra Frölunda IF	22	9	7	6	38	27	+11	25	
6	Grimsås IF	22	7	10	5	26	26	0	24	
7	Degerfors IF	22	8	6	8	32	32	0	22	
8	Hovås IF	22	6	5	11	27	42	−15	17	
9	IFK Arvika	22	6	4	12	34	46	−12	16	
10	Norrby IF	22	4	4	14	28	52	−24	12	Relegation to Division 3
11	IFK Värnamo	22	4	3	15	15	44	−29	11	Relegation to Division 3
12	Tidaholms GIF	22	2	6	14	28	54	−26	10	Relegation to Division 3

=== Södra Götaland ===
Pos	Team	Pld	W	D	L	GF	GA	GD	Pts	Qualification or relegation
1	Landskrona BoIS	22	12	6	4	41	19	+22	30	Playoffs for promotion to Allsvenskan
2	Hälsingborgs IF	22	11	7	4	35	23	+12	29	
3	Nybro IF	22	9	6	7	35	26	+9	24	
4	IFK Malmö	22	9	5	8	36	33	+3	23	
5	Perstorps SK	22	7	9	6	28	27	+1	23	
6	Halmstads BK	22	10	2	10	34	31	+3	22	
7	Kalmar FF	22	9	4	9	32	31	+1	22	
8	IFK Trelleborg	22	9	4	9	22	27	−5	22	
9	IS Halmia	22	8	5	9	22	28	−6	21	
10	IFK Ystad	22	8	5	9	31	59	−28	21	Relegation to Division 3
11	Hässleholms IF	22	7	5	10	26	33	−7	19	Relegation to Division 3
12	IFÖ/Bromölla IF	22	2	4	16	21	46	−25	8	Relegation to Division 3

== Allsvenskan promotion playoffs ==
Pos	Team	Pld	W	D	L	GF	GA	GD	Pts	Promotion
1	Landskrona BoIS	3	1	2	0	4	2	+2	4	Promotion to Allsvenskan
2	IFK Luleå	3	1	2	0	3	2	+1	4	Promotion to Allsvenskan
3	Sandvikens IF	3	1	0	2	4	4	0	2	
4	Skövde AIK	3	0	2	1	3	6	−3	2	
