= Hälleforsnäs IF =

Swedish sports club

- Full name: Hälleforsnäs idrottsförening
- Nicknames: Brukets blå
- Sport: football bandy (1925–2005) floorball
- Founded: 1925
- Based in: Hälleforsnäs, Sweden
- Ballpark: Edströmsvallen

Hälleforsnäs IF is a sports club in Hälleforsnäs, Sweden. Once known for its bandy successes, the club now plays floorball and football. The club was established in 1925 and played 21 seasons in the Swedish men's bandy top division. and reached the semi-finals during the season of 1978–79, the semi-final game series losing to Brobergs IF.

On 29 August 2005, it was announced that the bandy activity would be disestablished.
