= Norbergs BK =

Swedish sports club

- Full name: Norbergs bollklubb
- Sport: soccer
- Founded: 1914
- Team history: Norbergs AIF (1914–1985)
- Based in: Norberg, Sweden
- Ballpark: Malmheden IP

Norbergs BK is a soccer club in Norberg, Sweden, established in 1914 as Norbergs AIF before changing name in 1985.

The women's soccer team played in the Swedish top division in 1981 and 1982. and the men's soccer team played in the Swedish third division in 1976.
