= Ulricehamns IFK =

Swedish football club

- Full name: Ulricehamns Idrottsförening Kamraterna
- Nickname: UIFK
- Founded: 1992
- Ground: Lassalyckans IP; Ulricehamn; Sweden
- Chairman: Bengt-Olof Foss
- Coach: Marcus Sjöbring; Fredrik Wigestål
- League: Division 3 Sydvästra Götaland
- 2011: Division 3 Nordöstra Götaland, 9th
Home colours

Ulricehamns IFK is a Swedish football club located in Ulricehamn in Ulricehamn Municipality, Västra Götaland County.

== Background ==
Ulricehamns IFK is a football club based in Ulricehamn that was formed in 1992 through the merger of the football section of Ulricehamns IF and IFK Ulricehamn. Both clubs had a rich football history with UIF being over 80 years old and IFK Ulricehamn over 50 years old. The new club title created considerable debate and the choice of Ulricehamns Idrottsförening Kamraterna (UIFK) enabled both parties to see their own club name in the new title. The new club's colours of blue and black is a compromise from the merger. The amalgamation of 2 historic clubs represents a concerted attempt to place Ulricehamn on the Swedish football map by laying a solid foundation to progress to Division 2.

Since their foundation Ulricehamns IFK has participated mainly in the middle and lower divisions of the Swedish football league system. The club currently plays in Division 3 Sydvästra Götaland which is the fifth tier of Swedish football. They play their home matches at Lassalyckans IP in Ulricehamn.

Ulricehamns IFK are affiliated to the Västergötlands Fotbollförbund.

== Season to season ==
Season	Level	Division	Section	Position	Movements
1993	Tier 5	Division 4	Västergötland Södra	2nd	
1994	Tier 5	Division 4	Västergötland Södra	5th	
1995	Tier 5	Division 4	Västergötland Södra	3rd	
1996	Tier 5	Division 4	Västergötland Södra	1st	Promoted
1997	Tier 4	Division 3	Mellersta Götaland	4th	
1998	Tier 4	Division 3	Mellersta Götaland	6th	
1999	Tier 4	Division 3	Sydvästra Götaland	12th	Relegated
2000	Tier 5	Division 4	Västergötland Södra	6th	
2001	Tier 5	Division 4	Västergötland Södra	10th	Relegation Playoffs
2002	Tier 5	Division 4	Västergötland Södra	2nd	Promotion Playoffs – Promoted
2003	Tier 4	Division 3	Mellersta Götaland	8th	
2004	Tier 4	Division 3	Mellersta Götaland	8th	
2005	Tier 4	Division 3	Nordöstra Götaland	3rd	Promoted
2006*	Tier 4	Division 2	Mellersta Götaland	12th	Relegated
2007	Tier 5	Division 3	Nordöstra Götaland	10th	Relegated
2008	Tier 6	Division 4	Västergötland Södra	8th	
2009	Tier 6	Division 4	Västergötland Södra	1st	Promoted
2010	Tier 5	Division 3	Mellersta Götaland	7th	
2011	Tier 5	Division 3	Nordöstra Götaland	9th	Relegation Playoffs
2012	Tier 5	Division 3	Sydvästra Götaland	"4th"	

* League restructuring in 2006 resulted in a new division being created at Tier 3 and subsequent divisions dropping a level.

== Current squad ==
Note: Flags indicate national team as defined under FIFA eligibility rules; some limited exceptions apply. Players may hold more than one non-FIFA nationality.

No.	Pos.	Nation	Player
-	GK	SWE	Jesper Hallqvist
-	GK	SWE	Alexander Carlén
-	GK	SWE	Andreas Ahlberg
-	DF	SWE	Linus Falk
-	DF	SWE	Niklas Wiberg
-	DF	SWE	Tobias Arvidsson Wengbrand
-	DF	SWE	Mikael Sjögren
-	DF	SWE	Gusten Gustafsson
-	DF	SWE	Dennis Jalmarsson
-	DF	SWE	Jesper Gabrielsson
-	DF	SWE	Adam Bengtsson
-	MF	SWE	Ulf Lunnebjer Svensson

No.	Pos.	Nation	Player
-	MF	SWE	Anders Dungel
-	MF	SWE	Niklas Bergving
-	MF	SWE	Emil Laposa
-	MF	SWE	Azad Rakh
-	MF	SWE	Oscar Fritzson
-	MF	SWE	Oskar Gottfridsson
-	MF	SWE	Albert Lindhagen'
-	MF	SWE	Sebastian Johansson'
-	FW	SWE	Tobias Söderman
-	FW	SWE	Bekim Haxha
-	FW	SWE	Mattias Lindgren
-	FW	SWE	Victor Blomgren

== Attendances ==
In recent seasons Ulricehamns IFK have had the following average attendances:

Season	Average attendance	Division / Section	Level
2005	180	Div 3 Nordöstra Götaland	Tier 4
2006	249	Div 2 Mellersta Götaland	Tier 4
2007	99	Div 3 Nordöstra Götaland	Tier 5
2008	Not available	Div 4 Västergötland Södra	Tier 6
2009	Not available	Div 4 Västergötland Södra	Tier 6
2010	139	Div 3 Mellersta Götaland	Tier 5
2011	195	Div 3 Nordöstra Götaland	Tier 5

* Attendances are provided in the Publikliga sections of the Svenska Fotbollförbundet website.
