= IK Arvika =

Swedish football club

- Full name: Idrottsklubben Arvika
- Ground: Solviksvallen; Arvika; Sweden
- Chairman: Michael Dahlèn
- League: Division 4 Värmland

IK Arvika (Idrottsklubben Arvika, i.e., Sport Club Arvika) is a Swedish football club located in Arvika.

== Background ==
IK Arvika currently plays in Division 3 Värmland which is the fifth tier of Swedish football. They play their home matches at Solviksvallen in Arvika.

The club is affiliated to Värmlands Fotbollförbund.
