= Jämshögs IF =

Swedish football club

- Full name: Jämshögs Idrottsförening
- Nickname(s): JIF
- Founded: 1931
- Ground: Motorpavallen; Jämshög; Sweden
- League: Division 4 Blekinge
Home colours	Away colours

Jämshögs IF is a Swedish football club located in Jämshög.

== Background ==
Jämshögs IF currently plays in Division 4 Blekinge, which is the sixth tier of Swedish football. They play their home matches at the Motorpavallen in Jämshög, and the club is affiliated with Blekinge Fotbollförbund. Jämshögs IF have competed in the Svenska Cupen on 16 occasions and have completed a total of 34 matches.

== Season to season ==
Season	Level	Division	Section	Position	Movements
2006*	Tier 6	Division 4	Blekinge	3rd	
2007	Tier 6	Division 4	Blekinge	7th	
2008	Tier 6	Division 4	Blekinge	6th	
2009	Tier 6	Division 4	Blekinge	9th	
2010	Tier 6	Division 4	Blekinge	10th	
2011	Tier 6	Division 4	Blekinge	9th	

- In 2006, a new division was created at Tier 3 and subsequent divisions dropped a level due to league restructuring.
