= IFK Hässleholm =

Swedish football club

- Full name: Idrottsföreningen Kamraterna Hässleholm
- Nickname: IFK
- Founded: 1905; 1930–1980 (handball department)
- Ground: Österås IP, Skåne County Hässleholm, Sweden
- Capacity: 5,500 (450 seated)
- Chairman: John Paulsson
- Manager: Daniel Nilsson
- League: Division 2 Östra Götaland
- 2019: Division 2 Östra Götaland, 9th
Home colours	Away colours

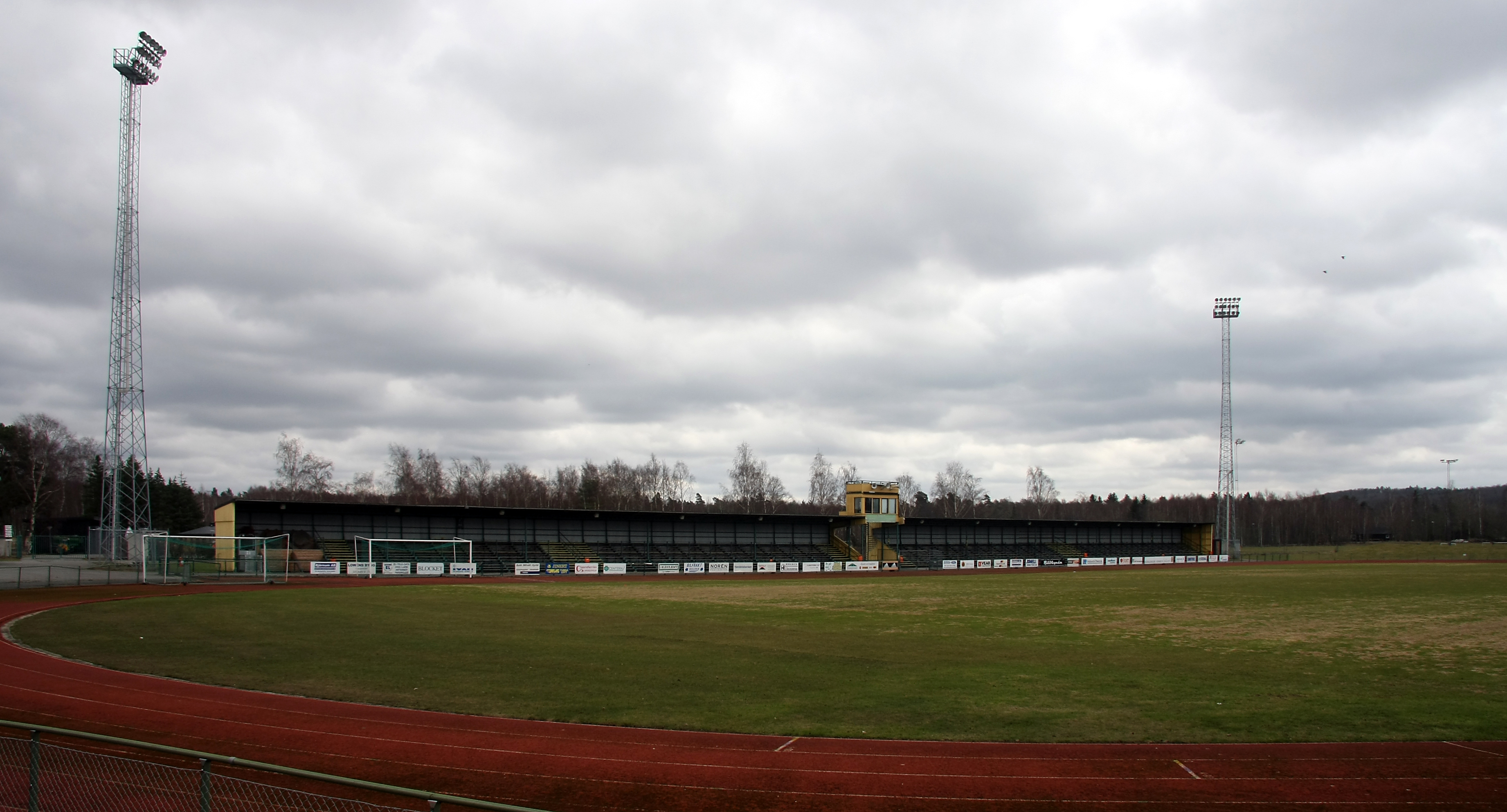
Österås IP

IFK Hässleholm is a Swedish football club from Hässleholm that was established in 1905. The team is currently playing in Division 2 Östra Götaland. Several well known players have played at the club including England international striker Peter Crouch as well as Swedish footballers Jon Jönsson, Andreas Dahl, and Tobias Linderoth. In recent years the club has played in Division 2, which is the fourth tier of the Swedish football league system. However, the club has played in second-tier football (Division 1 Södra and Division 2 Södra) in 1972–1974, 1975–81, 1987–1988, and 1992–1998.

== Background ==
The club was first established by factory owners and football enthusiast Knut Rydlund in 1905. When the club first started, the team played at Linnaeus Flats until Göinge Vallen was built in 1910. During the 1910s, IFK Hässleholm was considered to be one of the best football clubs in Sweden In 1918, the team won the Scanian Championship.

By the 1920s, the team slid down into Division 2. The club was hurting financially and in 1928, the club had to take out loans. Over the years, the team has struggled to maintain its former glory. In the 1930s, the club added a handball team which was fairly successful. The handball team was outshining the football team at this point in time. However, World War II broke up the football team. Once the team resumed playing, it was no longer able to compete in Division 2. The franchise therefore focused on handball. In 1948, the handball side won the Scanian Championship but the team had disintegrated by 1980. Despite the initial success of handball, football once again made its way back to the top in the 1950s. The team successful landed back in the Division 2 again. In 1962, the franchise built a club house on Svedje Mark Street. With some success in the 1970s, the construction of a new playing facility was erected called Österås IP which has a capacity of 6,000. Following that, the club won the 1972 Skåne North East with players such as Bo Nilsson. In 1973, the team came in third place and in 1974 the team took part in their first qualifier.

The best years of the club were undoubtedly from 1991 to 1993. In 1991, the team returned to Division 1 and by 1993 nearly reached Allsvenskan. The team's success boosted crowds up to 8,500, 1,500 fans over capacity. In the year 2000 there was a dramatic change in the club after Peter Crouch and Alton Thelwell were loaned from Tottenham Hotspur. Their loan brought new attention to the club resulting in Jon Jönsson being signed by Spurs.

IFK Hässleholm are affiliated to the Skånes Fotbollförbund. Local rivals Hässleholms IF play in the same division.

In recent years, the club has been a base for many South African players coming to Sweden, to acclimatize them before moving on to other Swedish clubs. The most notable example is Tokelo Rantie in Malmö FF, but players such as May Mahlangu and Ayanda Nkili have also played here.

== Season to season ==
Season	Level	Division	Section	Position	Movements
1993	Tier 2	Division 1	Södra	2nd	Promotion Playoffs
1994	Tier 2	Division 1	Södra	3rd	
1995	Tier 2	Division 1	Södra	8th	
1996	Tier 2	Division 1	Södra	6th	
1997	Tier 2	Division 1	Södra	7th	
1998	Tier 2	Division 1	Södra	12th	Relegated
1999	Tier 3	Division 2	Södra Götaland	4th	
2000	Tier 3	Division 2	Södra Götaland	10th	Relegation Playoffs – Relegated
2001	Tier 4	Division 3	Södra Götaland	1st	Promoted
2002	Tier 3	Division 2	Södra Götaland	4th	
2003	Tier 3	Division 2	Södra Götaland	8th	
2004	Tier 3	Division 2	Södra Götaland	3rd	
2005	Tier 3	Division 2	Södra Götaland	3rd	
2006*	Tier 3	Division 1	Södra	13th	Relegated
2007	Tier 4	Division 2	Södra Götaland	7th	
2008	Tier 4	Division 2	Södra Götaland	5th	
2009	Tier 4	Division 2	Södra Götaland	6th	
2010	Tier 4	Division 2	Östra Götaland	10th	Relegation Playoffs – Relegated
2011	Tier 5	Division 3	Sydvästra Götaland		

* League restructuring in 2006 resulted in a new division being created at Tier 3 and subsequent divisions dropping a level.

== Achievements ==
=== League ===
- Division 1 Södra
  - Runners-up (1): 1993
