= Hässleholms IF =

Swedish association football club

- Full name: Hässleholms Idrottsförening
- Nickname: HIF
- Founded: 1 May 1922; 104 years ago
- Ground: Österås IP; Hässleholm; Sweden
- Capacity: 5,500
- Chairman: Conny Bengtsson
- Head coach: Dan Olofsson
- League: Ettan
- 2026: 3rd of 16
Home colours

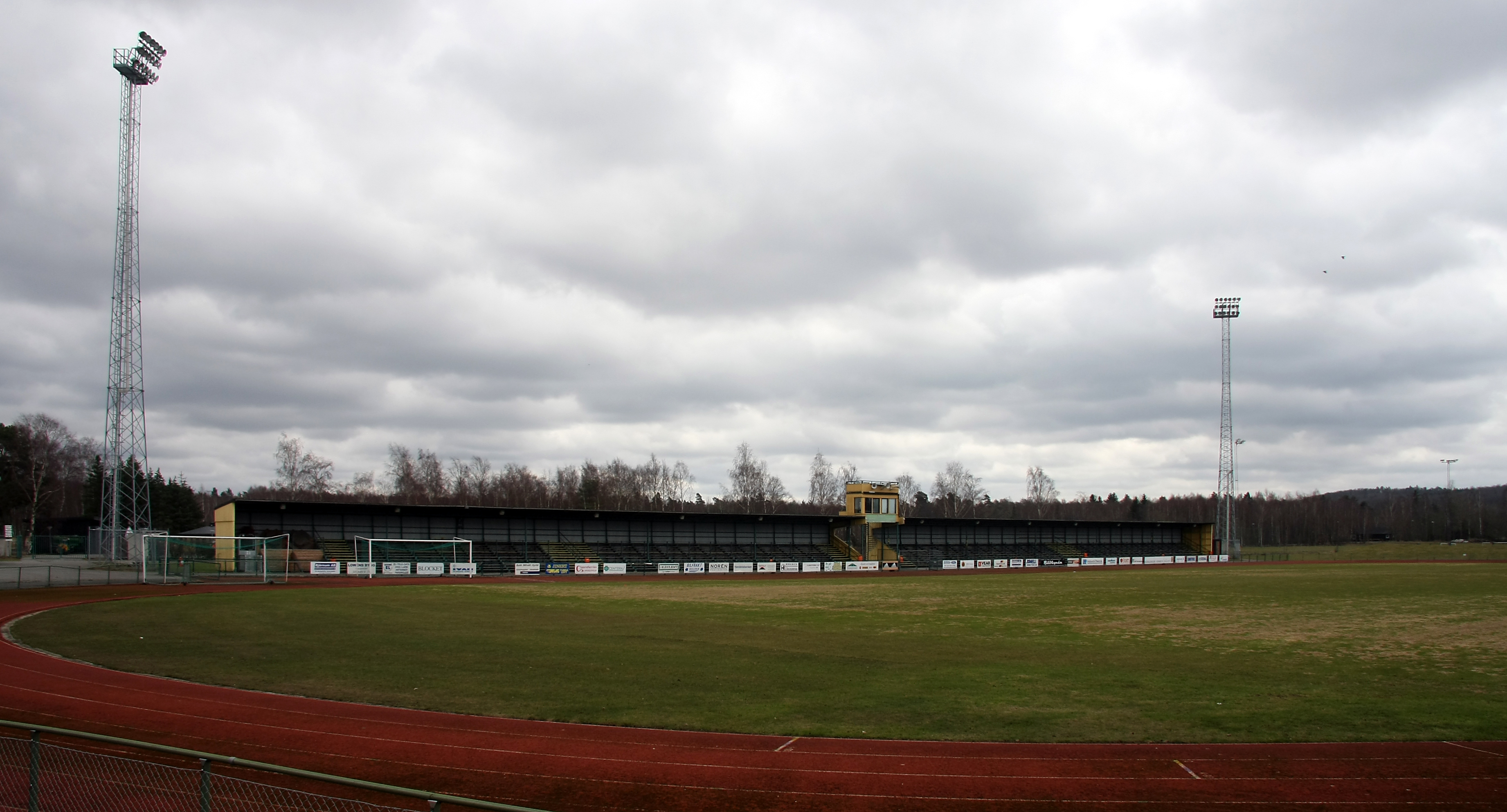
Österås IP

Hässleholms IF is a Swedish football club located in Hässleholm, Skåne County.

== Background ==
Hässleholms Idrottsförening were founded on 1 May 1922. In addition to football, the club over the years has run sections covering wrestling, table tennis, handball, bandy and ice hockey. HIF also has a basketball section with youth teams for boys and girls. Later the club has added a section for those with disabilities. For several years HIF had great success in youth football reflecting the development of this section of the club.

Since their foundation Hässleholms IF has participated mainly in the middle and lower divisions of the Swedish football league system. The club currently plays in Division 2 Södra Götaland which is the fourth tier of Swedish football. They play their home matches at the Österås IP in Hässleholm.

Hässleholms IF are affiliated to Skånes Fotbollförbund.

== Current squad ==
As of 1 August 2026

Note: Flags indicate national team as defined under FIFA eligibility rules; some limited exceptions apply. Players may hold more than one non-FIFA nationality.

| No. | Pos. | Nation | Player |
|---|---|---|---|
| 1 | GK | SWE | Liam Bengtsson |
| 2 | DF | SWE | Anton Branting |
| 3 | DF | SWE | Emil Arvidsson |
| 4 | DF | SWE | Marius Lerner |
| 5 | DF | SWE | Rami Jassim |
| 6 | DF | SWE | Adi Terzic |
| 7 | MF | SWE | Albin Andersson |
| 8 | DF | SWE | Johan Persson Åhstedt |
| 10 | MF | SWE | Vilmer Persson Åhstedt |
| 11 | FW | PLE | Ännäss Al-Hamlawi |
| 12 | MF | SWE | Albin Ahlstrand (on loan from Halmstad) |

| No. | Pos. | Nation | Player |
|---|---|---|---|
| 15 | MF | SWE | Theo Ekström |
| 16 | FW | SWE | Alex Hall |
| 18 | DF | SWE | Linus Gunnarsson |
| 19 | MF | SWE | Linus Braun (on loan from Landskrona BoIS) |
| 20 | FW | SWE | Loke Lundberg |
| 22 | MF | SWE | Jussi Tikkanen |
| 23 | FW | SWE | Albin Romberg |
| 24 | MF | SWE | Pontus Carlsson |
| 26 | MF | SWE | Emilo Olofsson |
| 31 | GK | SWE | Elton Ursprung |

== Recent history ==
In recent seasons Hässleholms IF have competed in the following divisions:

2025 – Ettan Södra
2024 – Division 2 Östra Götaland
2023 – Division 2 Östra Götaland
2022 – Division 2 Östra Götaland
2021 – Division 2 Östra Götaland
2020 – Division 2 Östra Götaland
2019 – Division 2 Östra Götaland
2018 – Division 2 Östra Götaland
2017 – Division 2 Östra Götaland
2016 – Division 2 Södra Götaland
2015 – Division 2 Södra Götaland
2014 – Division 2 Södra Götaland
2013 – Division 2 Södra Götaland
2012 – Division 3 Sydöstra Götaland
2011 – Division 3 Sydvästra Götaland
2010 – Division 4 Skåne Östra
2009 – Division 4 Skåne Norra
2008 – Division 3 Södra Götaland
2007 – Division 4 Skåne Norra
2006 – Division 4 Skåne Norra
2005 – Division 5 Skåne Mellersta
2004 – Division 5 Skåne Nordöstra
2003 – Division 5 Skåne Nordöstra
2002 – Division 5 Skåne Nordöstra
2001 – Division 4 Skåne Östra
2000 – Division 4 Skåne Norra
1999 – Division 4 Skåne Norra
