= IFK Östersund =

Swedish football club

- Full name: Idrottsföreningen Kamraterna Östersund
- Founded: 1906; 120 years ago
- Ground: Jämtkraft Arena; Östersund; Sweden
- Chairman: Sören Björklund
- Head coach: Daniel Doverlind
- League: Division 2 Norrland
Home colours

IFK Östersund is a Swedish football club located in Östersund in Jämtland.

== Background ==
Idrottsföreningen Kamraterna Östersund were founded on 7 March 1906 at the Café Temperance in Östersund. The club subsequently joined the IFK movement and specialised in a range of sports including football, bandy, ice hockey, handball, downhill skiing, cross country skiing, ski jumping, cycling, athletics, basketball, curling, boxing, wrestling, weightlifting and orienteering.

Since their foundation IFK Östersund has participated mainly in the upper and middle divisions of the Swedish football league system. The club's best period was in the 1950s and 1960s when they played a number of seasons in Division 2 Norrland which at that time was the second tier of Swedish football. In May 1959 the club hosted touring Brazilian side CR Vasco de Gama and lost 11–0.

The club currently plays in Division 3 Mellersta Norrland which is the fifth tier of Swedish football. They play their home matches at the Hofvallens IP in Östersund. The ground was first opened in 1917 but its current appearance reflects the work undertaken in 1936 when Hofvallen was redeveloped.

IFK Östersund are affiliated to the Jämtland-Härjedalens Fotbollförbund. In 1996/1997 the Ope IF, IFK Östersund, Ostersund / Torvalla FF clubs decided to work together on a joint venture to establish an elite new football club named Östersunds FK.

== Players ==
=== First team squad ===
Note: Flags indicate national team as defined under FIFA eligibility rules; some limited exceptions apply. Players may hold more than one non-FIFA nationality.

No.	Pos.	Nation	Player
2	DF	SWE	Emil Jonasson
3	DF	SWE	Christoffer Fryklund (captain)
4	MF	SWE	Ludvig Sundström
5	DF	SWE	Robin Fryklund
6	DF	SWE	Max Hjalmarsson
7	MF	SWE	Philip Fredriksson
8	MF	SWE	Tom Perman
9	FW	SWE	Patrik Lindgren
10	MF	SWE	Felix Nordin
11	MF	SWE	Henrik Dillner
12	DF	SWE	Olle Hallström
16	DF	ENG	Kevin Mbuti

No.	Pos.	Nation	Player
17	DF	SWE	Markus Svärd
18	FW	COD	Edji Mbunga
21	MF	ENG	Jordan Potter
22	MF	ENG	Lewis Whiteley
23	FW	SWE	Mattias Jonsson
24	DF	SWE	Anton Rapp
27	MF	SWE	Viktor Ageskär
28	MF	ENG	David Kuba-Kuba
30	GK	SWE	Eric Roman
—	GK	SWE	Anton Sundström
—	MF	SWE	Tobias Sundström

== Season to season ==
Season	Level	Division	Section	Position	Movements
1993	Tier 3	Division 2	Norrland	7th	
1994	Tier 3	Division 2	Norrland	11th	Relegated
1995	Tier 4	Division 3	Mellersta Norrland	1st	Promoted
1996	Tier 3	Division 2	Norrland	11th	Relegated
1997	Tier 4	Division 3	Mellersta Norrland	6th	
1998	Tier 4	Division 3	Mellersta Norrland	10th	Relegated
1999	Tier 5	Division 4	Jämtland/Härjedalen	2nd	
2000	Tier 5	Division 4	Jämtland/Härjedalen	5th	
2001	Tier 5	Division 4	Jämtland/Härjedalen	1st	Promoted
2002	Tier 4	Division 3	Mellersta Norrland	1st	Promoted
2003	Tier 3	Division 2	Norrland	11th	Relegated
2004	Tier 4	Division 3	Mellersta Norrland	11th	Relegated
2005	Tier 5	Division 4	Jämtland/Härjedalen	2nd	Promoted
2006*	Tier 5	Division 3	Mellersta Norrland	3rd	
2007	Tier 5	Division 3	Mellersta Norrland	4th	
2008	Tier 5	Division 3	Mellersta Norrland	7th	
2009	Tier 5	Division 3	Mellersta Norrland	6th	
2010	Tier 5	Division 3	Mellersta Norrland	8th	
2011	Tier 5	Division 3	Mellersta Norrland	10th	Relegated
2012	Tier 6	Division 4	Jämtland/Härjedalen	1st	Promoted
2013	Tier 5	Division 3	Mellersta Norrland	2nd	Promoted

* League restructuring in 2006 resulted in a new division being created at Tier 3 and subsequent divisions dropping a level.

== Attendances ==
In recent seasons IFK Östersund have had the following average attendances:

Season	Average attendance	Division / Section	Level
2005	Not available	Div 4 Jämtland/Härjedalen	Tier 5
2006	105	Div 3 Mellersta Norrland	Tier 5
2007	121	Div 3 Mellersta Norrland	Tier 5
2008	91	Div 3 Mellersta Norrland	Tier 5
2009	126	Div 3 Mellersta Norrland	Tier 5
2010	160	Div 3 Mellersta Norrland	Tier 5

* Attendances are provided in the Publikliga sections of the Svenska Fotbollförbundet website.

The highest attendance at Hofvallen was 5,355 spectators who attended the match with Marma IF (in Division 2 Norrland) on 5 October 1957.
