= Norsjö IF =

Swedish football club

- Full name: Norsjö Idrottsförening
- Founded: 5 January 1919
- Ground: Rännaren; Norsjö; Sweden
- Coach: Andreas Bertils; Dennis Jakobsson
- League: Division 4 Västerbotten Norra
- 2010: Division 3 Norra Norrland, 12th (Relegated)
Home colours

Norsjö IF is a Swedish football club located in Norsjö in Västerbotten County.

== Background ==
Since their foundation in 1919 Norsjö IF has participated mainly in the middle and lower divisions of the Swedish football league system. In 2010 the club played in Division 3 Norra Norrland which is the fifth tier of Swedish football but finished in last position and will play in Division 4 Västerbotten Norra for the 2011 season. They play their home matches at the Rännaren in Norsjö.

Norsjö IF are affiliated to the Västerbottens Fotbollförbund.

== Season to season ==
Season	Level	Division	Section	Position	Movements
1993	Tier 5	Division 4	Västerbotten Norra	2nd	
1994	Tier 5	Division 4	Västerbotten Norra	2nd	Promotion Playoffs
1995	Tier 5	Division 4	Västerbotten Norra	4th	
1996	Tier 5	Division 4	Västerbotten Norra	5th	
1997	Tier 5	Division 4	Västerbotten Norra	4th	
1998	Tier 5	Division 4	Västerbotten Norra	7th	
1999	Tier 5	Division 4	Västerbotten Norra	1st	Promotion Playoffs – Promoted
2000	Tier 4	Division 3	Norra Norrland	10th	Relegated
2001	Tier 5	Division 4	Västerbotten Norra	6th	
2002	Tier 5	Division 4	Västerbotten Norra	6th	
2003	Tier 5	Division 4	Västerbotten Norra	8th	
2004	Tier 5	Division 4	Västerbotten Norra	6th	
2005	Tier 5	Division 4	Västerbotten Norra	2nd	Promotion Playoffs
2006*	Tier 6	Division 4	Västerbotten Norra	7th	
2007	Tier 6	Division 4	Västerbotten Norra	7th	
2008	Tier 6	Division 4	Västerbotten Norra	1st	Promoted
2009	Tier 5	Division 3	Norra Norrland	6th	
2010	Tier 5	Division 3	Norra Norrland	12th	Relegated
2011	Tier 6	Division 4	Västerbotten Norra		

* League restructuring in 2006 resulted in a new division being created at Tier 3 and subsequent divisions dropping a level.

== Attendances ==
In recent seasons Norsjö IF have had the following average attendances:

Season	Average attendance	Division / Section	Level
2008	Not available	Div 4 Västerbotten Norra	Tier 6
2009	246	Div 3 Norra Norrland	Tier 5
2010	108	Div 3 Norra Norrland	Tier 5

* Attendances are provided in the Publikliga sections of the Svenska Fotbollförbundet website.
