= Perstorps SK =

Swedish football club

- Full name: Perstorps Sportklubb
- Founded: 1925
- Ground: Ybbarps Idrottsplats; Perstorp; Sweden
- Chairman: Christer Eliasson
- Coach: Peter Ahlberg; Dan Olofsson; Christer Eliasson
- League: Division 3 Södra Götaland
- 2010: Division 4 Skåne Nordvästra, 1st (Promoted)
Home colours	Away colours

Perstorps SK is a Swedish football club located in Perstorp.

== Background ==
Perstorps Sportklubb was founded in 1925 and has specialised over the years in a number of sports including boxing, athletics, gymnastics, running sports, handball, orienteering, and cycling, as well as football, which has been the dominant sport.

Since their foundation Perstorps SK has participated mainly in the middle and lower divisions of the Swedish football league system. They played four seasons in Division 2, which was then the second tier of Swedish football, in 1960 and from 1970 to 1972. The club currently plays in Division 3 Södra Götaland which is the fifth tier of Swedish football. They play their home matches at the Ybbarps Idrottsplats in Perstorp.

Perstorps SK are affiliated to Skånes Fotbollförbund.

== Recent history ==
In recent seasons Perstorps SK have competed in the following divisions:

2010 – Division IV, Skåne Nordvästra
2009 – Division IV, Skåne Norra
2008 – Division IV, Skåne Norra
2007 – Division IV, Skåne Norra
2006 – Division IV, Skåne Norra
2005 – Division IV, Skåne Östra
2004 – Division III, Sydvästra Götaland
2003 – Division III, Sydvästra Götaland
2002 – Division III, Södra Götaland
2001 – Division III, Södra Götaland
2000 – Division III, Sydöstra Götaland
1999 – Division III, Södra Götaland

== Attendances ==
In recent seasons Perstorps SK have had the following average attendances:

Season	Average attendance	Division / Section	Level
2009	Not available	Div 4 Skåne Norra	Tier 6
2010	105	Div 4 Skåne Nordvästra	Tier 6

* Attendances are provided in the Publikliga sections of the Svenska Fotbollförbundet website.
