= Tranås BoIS =

- City: Tranås, Sweden
- League: Allsvenskan
- Founded: 1941; 84 years ago

Tranås BoIS is a sports club in Tranås, Sweden, mainly concentrated on playing bandy. The formal, registered name is Tranås BoIS bandyklubb. The team colours are blue, white and red. The club was founded in 1941 by the fusion of the clubs Tranås IK and Tranås SK.

As of 2014, the club's men's team has played in the second level bandy league in Sweden, Allsvenskan, since 2008. The club's women's team was the runner-up for the Swedish Championship in 1975.
