= 2002 Division 3 (Swedish football) =

Swedish League Division 3
- Season: 2002
- Champions: Sunnanå SK; IFK Östersund; Falu BS FK; Vasalunds IF; Tyresö FF; Strömtorps IK; Smedby AIS; Melleruds IF; Floda BoIF; Växjö BK; Skene IF; Bunkeflo IF
- Promoted: 12 teams above and: Jonsereds IF; Kristianstads FF; Ljungby IF
- Relegated: 42 teams

Statistics of Swedish football Division 3 for the 2002 season.

== League standings ==
=== Norra Norrland 2002 ===
Pos	Team	Pld	W	D	L	GF	GA	GD	Pts	Promotion or relegation
1	Sunnanå SK	22	14	6	2	73	25	+48	48	Promoted
2	Morön BK, Skellefteå	22	13	5	4	52	32	+20	44	Promotion Playoffs
3	Polcirkeln/Svanstein FF, Juoksengi	22	11	5	6	35	36	−1	38	
4	Gammelstads IF	22	11	4	7	48	44	+4	37	
5	Betsele IF, Lycksele	22	10	4	8	51	40	+11	34	
6	Malmbergets AIF	22	10	2	10	32	39	−7	32	
7	Infjärdens SK, Roknäs	22	8	7	7	45	38	+7	31	
8	Furunäs/Bullmarks IK	22	6	8	8	38	34	+4	26	
9	Sunderby SK, Södra Sunderbyn	22	8	2	12	34	44	−10	26	Relegation Playoffs
10	Malå IF	22	5	6	11	42	46	−4	21	Relegated
11	Notvikens IK, Luleå	22	6	3	13	30	49	−19	21	Relegated
12	Haparanda FF	22	3	2	17	22	75	−53	11	Relegated

=== Mellersta Norrland 2002 ===
Pos	Team	Pld	W	D	L	GF	GA	GD	Pts	Promotion or relegation
1	IFK Östersund	22	15	3	4	53	18	+35	48	Promoted
2	IFK Sundsvall	22	12	6	4	46	32	+14	42	Promotion Playoffs
3	Sävar IK	22	10	7	5	48	28	+20	37	
4	Stockviks FF	22	11	4	7	45	35	+10	37	
5	Gimonäs CK, Umeå	22	10	2	10	35	39	−4	32	
6	Sörfors IF, Umeå	22	9	4	9	34	41	−7	31	
7	Anundsjö IF, Bredbyn	22	9	3	10	58	60	−2	30	
8	IFK Holmsund	22	7	7	8	37	37	0	28	
9	Umedalens IF, Umeå	22	6	7	9	35	43	−8	25	Relegation Playoffs
10	Sund IF, Sundsbruk	22	6	4	12	49	63	−14	22	Relegated
11	Matfors IF	22	4	8	10	39	53	−14	20	Relegated
12	Lucksta IF	22	4	3	15	29	59	−30	15	Relegated

=== Södra Norrland 2002 ===
Pos	Team	Pld	W	D	L	GF	GA	GD	Pts	Promotion or relegation
1	Falu BS FK, Falun	22	15	4	3	46	19	+27	49	Promoted
2	Harmångers IF	22	12	5	5	40	24	+16	41	Promotion Playoffs
3	Hudiksvalls ABK	22	12	4	6	55	26	+29	40	
4	Ytterhogdals IK	22	10	8	4	45	32	+13	38	
5	Brynäs IF FK, Gävle	22	10	5	7	35	39	−4	35	
6	Gestrike-Hammarby IF	22	7	9	6	37	33	+4	30	
7	Dala-Järna IK	22	7	5	10	29	34	−5	26	
8	Islingby IK, Borlänge	22	7	5	10	36	49	−13	26	
9	IK Huge, Gävle	22	5	10	7	24	32	−8	25	Relegation Playoffs – Relegated
10	IFK Mora FK	22	6	4	12	27	44	−17	22	Relegated
11	Sandvikens AIK FK	22	6	3	13	31	40	−9	21	Relegated
12	Delsbo IF	22	2	4	16	26	59	−33	10	Relegated

=== Norra Svealand 2002 ===
Pos	Team	Pld	W	D	L	GF	GA	GD	Pts	Promotion or relegation
1	Vasalunds IF, Solna	22	16	4	2	63	18	+45	52	Promoted
2	Heby AIF	22	12	4	6	48	26	+22	40	Promotion Playoffs
3	Bromstens IK, Spånga	22	12	4	6	46	37	+9	40	
4	Gamla Uppsala SK	22	10	6	6	29	15	+14	36	
5	Bollstanäs SK	22	10	6	6	41	28	+13	36	
6	IK Fyris, Uppsala	22	9	6	7	45	31	+14	33	
7	IK Frej, Täby	22	7	5	10	43	51	−8	26	
8	IF Vindhemspojkarna, Uppsala	22	6	7	9	30	38	−8	25	
9	Spånga IS FK	22	6	5	11	26	48	−22	23	Relegation Playoffs
10	Turebergs IF	22	5	7	10	28	43	−15	22	Relegated
11	Fårösunds GoIK	22	5	5	12	22	48	−26	20	Relegated
12	Gimo IF FK	22	1	7	14	18	56	−38	10	Relegated

=== Östra Svealand 2002 ===
Pos	Team	Pld	W	D	L	GF	GA	GD	Pts	Promotion or relegation
1	Tyresö FF	22	15	2	5	61	30	+31	47	Promoted
2	Älvsjö AIK FF	22	13	6	3	42	23	+19	45	Promotion Playoffs
3	Arameiska-Syrianska KIF, Norsborg	22	11	5	6	47	35	+12	38	
4	Ängby IF	22	11	5	6	46	35	+11	38	
5	Nyköpings BIS	22	11	4	7	52	31	+21	37	
6	Huddinge IF	22	8	7	7	37	34	+3	31	
7	Enskede IK	22	8	6	8	33	31	+2	30	
8	Gustavsbergs IF	22	9	2	11	45	50	−5	29	
9	Älta IF	22	8	5	9	41	47	−6	29	Relegation Playoffs
10	Katrineholms SK FK	22	7	3	12	30	49	−19	24	Relegated
11	Sundbybergs IK	22	3	4	15	30	62	−32	13	Relegated
12	BK Sport, Eskilstuna	22	2	3	17	24	61	−37	9	Relegated

=== Västra Svealand 2002 ===
Pos	Team	Pld	W	D	L	GF	GA	GD	Pts	Promotion or relegation
1	Strömtorps IK, Degerfors	22	13	5	4	50	29	+21	44	Promoted
2	IFK Eskilstuna	22	13	3	6	63	28	+35	42	Promotion Playoffs
3	Carlstad United BK	22	13	3	6	47	26	+21	42	
4	Rottneros IK	22	13	3	6	42	25	+17	42	
5	Västerås IK	22	10	7	5	49	38	+11	37	
6	Örebro SK Ungdomsklubb	22	10	6	6	35	22	+13	36	
7	Säffle FF	22	9	2	11	36	43	−7	29	
8	KB Karlskoga FF	22	8	4	10	36	47	−11	28	
9	Frövi IK	22	6	7	9	36	47	−11	25	Relegation Playoffs – Relegated
10	IK Franke, Västerås	22	5	4	13	26	51	−25	19	Relegated
11	IFK Västerås FK	22	4	2	16	25	66	−41	14	Relegated
12	Skultuna IS	22	3	4	15	25	48	−23	13	Relegated

=== Nordöstra Götaland 2002 ===
Pos	Team	Pld	W	D	L	GF	GA	GD	Pts	Promotion or relegation
1	Smedby AIS, Norrköping	22	15	3	4	48	19	+29	48	Promoted
2	LSW IF, Motala	22	13	4	5	59	37	+22	43	Promotion Playoffs
3	IK Ramunder, Söderköping	22	11	5	6	45	38	+7	38	
4	Tenhults IF	22	10	6	6	42	29	+13	36	
5	Mjölby AI FF	22	10	3	9	34	36	−2	33	
6	Västerviks FF	22	10	2	10	53	56	−3	32	
7	BK Wolfram, Linköping	22	8	7	7	40	33	+7	31	
8	Gullringens GoIF	22	7	7	8	45	29	+16	28	
9	Malmslätts AIK	22	7	7	8	31	34	−3	28	Relegation Playoffs
10	Nässjö FF	22	7	5	10	38	45	−7	26	Relegated
11	Tranås FF	22	3	6	13	33	43	−10	15	Relegated
12	BK Zeros, Motala	22	3	1	18	24	93	−69	10	Relegated

=== Nordvästra Götaland 2002 ===
Pos	Team	Pld	W	D	L	GF	GA	GD	Pts	Promotion or relegation
1	Melleruds IF	22	13	5	4	55	30	+25	44	Promoted
2	Vallens IF, Spekeröd	22	12	4	6	57	29	+28	40	Promotion Playoffs
3	IK Oddevold, Uddevalla	22	10	6	6	37	34	+3	36	
4	IFK Fjärås	22	10	5	7	45	27	+18	35	
5	KF Velebit, Hisings-Kärra	22	10	5	7	55	41	+14	35	
6	Ösebro IF	22	8	9	5	40	35	+5	33	
7	Kållereds SK	22	8	4	10	55	53	+2	28	
8	IF Väster, Västra Frölunda	22	8	4	10	41	45	−4	28	
9	Marieholm BoIK, Angered	22	8	4	10	34	47	−13	28	Relegation Playoffs – Relegated
10	IK Kongahälla, Kungälv	22	8	3	11	37	47	−10	27	Relegated
11	Rosseröds IK, Uddevalla	22	7	5	10	35	49	−14	26	Relegated
12	Grebbestads IF	22	0	6	16	15	69	−54	6	Relegated

=== Mellersta Götaland 2002 ===
Pos	Team	Pld	W	D	L	GF	GA	GD	Pts	Promotion or relegation
1	Floda BoIF	22	15	4	3	64	20	+44	49	Promoted
2	Jonsereds IF	22	14	7	1	43	13	+30	49	Promotion Playoffs – Promoted
3	Gerdskens BK, Alingsås	22	13	4	5	46	32	+14	43	
4	Mariedals IK, Borås	22	8	8	6	40	31	+9	32	
5	Herrljunga SK FK	22	10	2	10	46	44	+2	32	
6	IFK Mariestad	22	9	4	9	35	39	−4	31	
7	Vara SK	22	8	5	9	43	46	−3	29	
8	Ulvåkers IF	22	9	2	11	33	39	−6	29	
9	Lerums IS	22	6	8	8	38	35	+3	26	Relegation Playoffs – Relegated
10	IFK Skövde FK	22	7	4	11	30	38	−8	25	Relegated
11	Götene IF	22	4	3	15	24	48	−24	15	Relegated
12	Jula BK, Mariestad	22	1	5	16	21	78	−57	8	Relegated

=== Sydöstra Götaland 2002 ===
Pos	Team	Pld	W	D	L	GF	GA	GD	Pts	Promotion or relegation
1	Växjö BK	22	21	1	0	71	17	+54	64	Promoted
2	Kristianstads FF	22	13	4	5	64	33	+31	43	Promotion Playoffs – Promoted
3	Sölvesborgs GoIF	22	10	7	5	53	43	+10	37	
4	Alvesta GoIF	22	11	4	7	45	43	+2	37	
5	Jämshögs IF	22	9	4	9	24	38	−14	31	
6	IFö/Bromölla IF	22	9	2	11	40	42	−2	29	
7	Färjestadens GoIF	22	7	5	10	49	47	+2	26	
8	Lindsdals IF, Kalmar	22	6	7	9	38	47	−9	25	
9	Ronneby BK	22	7	3	12	36	50	−14	24	Relegation Playoffs
10	Kalmar AIK FK	22	6	4	12	27	37	−10	22	Relegated
11	Högby IF, Löttorp	22	6	3	13	32	46	−14	21	Relegated
12	Näsby IF	22	2	6	14	34	70	−36	12	Relegated

=== Sydvästra Götaland 2002 ===
Pos	Team	Pld	W	D	L	GF	GA	GD	Pts	Promotion or relegation
1	Skene IF	22	16	3	3	53	23	+30	51	Promoted
2	Ljungby IF	22	13	5	4	42	26	+16	44	Promotion Playoffs – Promoted
3	Varbergs GIF FF	22	13	2	7	52	38	+14	41	
4	Vinbergs IF	22	12	2	8	45	40	+5	38	
5	IF Hagapojkarna, Jönköping	22	11	5	6	33	39	−6	38	
6	Kinna IF	22	10	0	12	44	44	0	30	
7	Bredaryds IK	22	8	4	10	42	32	+10	28	
8	IS Halmia, Halmstad	22	8	4	10	37	43	−6	28	
9	Skrea IF, Falkenberg	22	8	3	11	38	47	−9	27	Relegation Playoffs – Relegated
10	Markaryds IF	22	6	5	11	43	50	−7	23	Relegated
11	Smålandsstenars GoIF	22	6	3	13	24	35	−11	21	Relegated
12	Unnaryds GoIF	22	2	2	18	31	67	−36	8	Relegated

=== Södra Götaland 2002 ===
Pos	Team	Pld	W	D	L	GF	GA	GD	Pts	Promotion or relegation
1	Bunkeflo IF	22	14	6	2	51	28	+23	48	Promoted
2	Asmundstorps IF	22	11	5	6	38	20	+18	38	Promotion Playoffs
3	GIF Nike, Lomma	22	11	5	6	38	22	+16	38	
4	Kirsebergs IF, Malmö	22	11	5	6	42	27	+15	38	
5	Kulladals FF, Malmö	22	9	5	8	44	40	+4	32	
6	FBK Balkan, Malmö	22	8	7	7	28	22	+6	31	
7	Svalövs BK	22	9	4	9	48	53	−5	31	
8	Perstorps SK	22	9	2	11	40	42	−2	29	
9	Bjärreds IF	22	8	3	11	30	34	−4	27	Relegation Playoffs – Relegated
10	Åkarps IF	22	6	5	11	26	42	−16	23	Relegated
11	BK Olympic, Malmö	22	5	5	12	29	54	−25	20	Relegated
12	Oxie IF	22	4	2	16	21	51	−30	14	Relegated
