= 2004 Division 3 (Swedish football) =

Swedish League Division 3
- Season: 2004
- Champions: Hemmingsmarks IF; Gimonäs CK; Slätta SK; IK Frej; Hammarby Talang FF; Örebro SK Ungdom; IF Heimer; Melleruds IF; Lindome GIF; Nybro IF; VMA IK; Helsingborgs Södra BIS
- Promoted: 12 teams above and: Bollstanäs SK; Tenhults IF
- Relegated: 46 teams

Statistics of Swedish football Division 3 for the 2004 season.

== League standings ==
=== Norra Norrland 2004 ===
Pos	Team	Pld	W	D	L	GF	GA	GD	Pts	Promotion or relegation
1	Hemmingsmarks IF	22	15	2	5	48	28	+20	47	Promoted
2	Furunäs/Bullmark IK	22	13	5	4	45	21	+24	44	Promotion Playoffs
3	Infjärdens SK, Roknäs	22	12	8	2	55	35	+20	44	
4	Sunnanå SK, Skellefteå	22	12	5	5	55	28	+27	41	
5	Polcirkeln/Svanstein FF, Juoksengi	22	9	6	7	33	29	+4	33	
6	Notvikens IK, Luleå	22	8	6	8	37	44	−7	30	
7	Sävast AIF, Boden	22	8	5	9	38	48	−10	29	
8	Morön BK	22	8	4	10	34	30	+4	28	
9	Ohtana/Aapua FF, Korpilombolo	22	5	8	9	28	38	−10	23	Relegation Playoffs – Relegated
10	Sunderby SK, Södra Sunderbyn	22	6	2	14	36	44	−8	20	Relegated
11	Rönnskärs IF, Skelleftehamn	22	4	4	14	30	61	−31	16	Relegated
12	Alviks IK, Umeå	22	3	3	16	28	61	−33	12	Relegated

=== Mellersta Norrland 2004 ===
Pos	Team	Pld	W	D	L	GF	GA	GD	Pts	Promotion or relegation
1	Gimonäs CK	22	12	6	4	32	22	+10	42	Promoted
2	Kubikenborgs IF, Sundsvall	22	11	5	6	43	27	+16	38	Promotion Playoffs
3	Ersboda SK, Umeå	22	11	5	6	47	32	+15	38	
4	Stockviks FF, Sundsvall	22	9	7	6	45	34	+11	34	
5	Betsele IF, Lycksele	22	8	5	9	36	46	−10	29	
6	Graninge FF	22	7	7	8	41	36	+5	28	
7	IFK Sundsvall	22	6	10	6	27	28	−1	28	
8	Ope IF	22	7	7	8	37	48	−11	28	
9	IFK Holmsund	22	6	9	7	42	34	+8	27	Relegation Playoffs
10	Hägglunds IoFK, Örnsköldsvik	22	7	5	10	39	47	−8	26	Relegated
11	IFK Östersund	22	6	5	11	36	48	−12	23	Relegated
12	Alnö IF	22	5	3	14	32	55	−23	18	Relegated

=== Södra Norrland 2004 ===
Pos	Team	Pld	W	D	L	GF	GA	GD	Pts	Promotion or relegation
1	Slätta SK, Falun	22	15	3	4	54	28	+26	48	Promoted
2	Hudiksvalls ABK	22	13	5	4	52	26	+26	44	Promotion Playoffs
3	Sandvikens AIK FK	22	13	2	7	44	37	+7	41	
4	Söderhamns FF	22	10	7	5	40	27	+13	37	
5	Forssa BK, Borlänge	22	9	6	7	39	32	+7	33	
6	Gestrike-Hammarby IF	22	9	5	8	54	47	+7	32	
7	Korsnäs IF FK, Falun	22	7	9	6	35	31	+4	30	
8	Strands IF, Hudiksvall	22	6	6	10	31	37	−6	24	
9	Ytterhogdals IK	22	6	6	10	30	43	−13	24	Relegation Playoffs – Relegated
10	Viksjöfors IF FF, Edsbyn	22	6	2	14	27	46	−19	20	Relegated
11	Näsvikens IK	22	5	4	13	34	51	−17	19	Relegated
12	Harmångers IF	22	4	3	15	23	58	−35	15	Relegated

=== Norra Svealand 2004 ===
Pos	Team	Pld	W	D	L	GF	GA	GD	Pts	Promotion or relegation
1	IK Frej, Täby	22	14	4	4	65	32	+33	46	Promoted
2	Bollstanäs SK	22	11	5	6	45	30	+15	38	Promotion Playoffs – Promoted
3	IFK Sollentuna	22	10	6	6	46	30	+16	36	
4	Brynäs IF FK, Gävle	22	10	5	7	37	38	−1	35	
5	Värtans IK, Stockholm	22	9	7	6	52	36	+16	34	
6	Enköpings IS	22	9	4	9	49	49	0	31	
7	IFK Österåkers FK, Åkersberga	22	8	6	8	48	40	+8	30	
8	IK Fyris, Uppsala	22	8	6	8	34	32	+2	30	
9	Bälinge IF	22	9	3	10	35	41	−6	30	Relegation Playoffs – Relegated
10	Heby AIF	22	7	4	11	34	38	−4	25	Relegated
11	IF Vindhemspojkarna, Uppsala	22	6	6	10	31	48	−17	24	Relegated
12	Gimo IF FK	22	2	2	18	9	71	−62	8	Relegated

=== Östra Svealand 2004 ===
Pos	Team	Pld	W	D	L	GF	GA	GD	Pts	Promotion or relegation
1	Hammarby Talang FF, Stockholm	22	15	1	6	67	25	+42	46	Promoted
2	Arameiska-Syrianska KIF, Norsborg	22	14	2	6	45	30	+15	44	Promotion Playoffs
3	Spånga IS FK	22	12	5	5	53	30	+23	41	
4	Haningealliansens FF	22	11	4	7	48	37	+11	37	
5	Värmdö IF	22	9	7	6	43	38	+5	34	
6	IFK Eskilstuna	22	8	6	8	38	35	+3	30	
7	Gröndals IK, Stockholm	22	9	1	12	28	38	−10	28	
8	Älvsjö AIK FF	22	7	5	10	34	41	−7	26	
9	Eskilstuna Södra FF	22	7	4	11	30	56	−26	25	Relegation Playoffs
10	Älta IF	22	6	5	11	31	48	−17	23	Relegated
11	Huddinge IF	22	5	4	13	36	60	−24	19	Relegated
12	Enhörna IF	22	4	6	12	36	51	−15	18	Relegated

=== Västra Svealand 2004 ===
Pos	Team	Pld	W	D	L	GF	GA	GD	Pts	Promotion or relegation
1	Örebro SK Ungdom	22	13	5	4	43	26	+17	44	Promoted
2	Kungsör BK	22	12	5	5	48	38	+10	41	Promotion Playoffs
3	Strömtorps IK, Degerfors	22	12	4	6	43	27	+16	40	
4	Köping FF	22	9	7	6	49	43	+6	34	
5	IFK Kumla	22	10	4	8	42	38	+4	34	
6	BK Derby/Wolfram, Linköping	22	11	1	10	42	42	0	34	
7	Frövi IK	22	9	6	7	38	35	+3	33	
8	Syrianska IF Kerburan, Västerås	22	9	4	9	48	38	+10	31	
9	Smedby AIS, Norrköping	22	8	5	9	33	38	−5	29	Relegation Playoffs – Relegated
10	Söderköpings IK	22	8	2	12	42	43	−1	26	Relegated
11	Katrineholms SK FK	22	4	4	14	32	54	−22	16	Relegated
12	BK Hird, Norrköping	22	2	3	17	28	66	−38	9	Relegated

=== Nordöstra Götaland 2004 ===
Pos	Team	Pld	W	D	L	GF	GA	GD	Pts	Promotion or relegation
1	IF Heimer, Lidköping	22	18	2	2	64	24	+40	56	Promoted
2	Tenhults IF	22	15	4	3	51	33	+18	49	Promotion Playoffs – Promoted
3	Motala AIF FK	22	13	2	7	49	30	+19	41	
4	Hjulsbro IK, Linköping	22	9	8	5	44	31	+13	35	
5	IF Hagapojkarna, Jönköping	22	8	10	4	39	42	−3	34	
6	IFK Falköping FF	22	8	5	9	45	42	+3	29	
7	Mjölby AI FF	22	9	1	12	40	48	−8	28	
8	Linköpings FF	22	7	5	10	38	39	−1	26	
9	BK Zeros, Motala	22	7	5	10	37	44	−7	26	Relegation Playoffs – Relegated
10	Götene IF	22	6	2	14	41	53	−12	20	Relegated
11	IK Östria Lambohov, Linköping	22	4	5	13	22	38	−16	17	Relegated
12	LSW IF, Motala	22	1	5	16	28	74	−46	8	Relegated

=== Nordvästra Götaland 2004 ===
Pos	Team	Pld	W	D	L	GF	GA	GD	Pts	Promotion or relegation
1	Melleruds IF	22	15	5	2	52	17	+35	50	Promoted
2	Lärje/Angereds IF	22	14	5	3	75	26	+49	47	Promotion Playoffs
3	KF Velebit, Hisings-Kärra	22	11	6	5	42	26	+16	39	
4	IFK Trollhättan	22	9	7	6	35	30	+5	34	
5	Lundby IF, Göteborg	22	9	6	7	35	29	+6	33	
6	Finlandia/Pallo IF, Göteborg	22	7	8	7	31	41	−10	29	
7	Inlands IF, Lilla Edet	22	8	4	10	33	38	−5	28	
8	Åsebro IF	22	6	7	9	30	39	−9	25	
9	Stenungsunds IF	22	6	6	10	32	39	−7	24	Relegation Playoffs – Relegated
10	SK Sifhälla, Säffle	22	6	3	13	30	48	−18	21	Relegated
11	IK Arvika Fotboll	22	6	1	15	31	68	−37	19	Relegated
12	IF Vardar/Makedonija, Göteborg	22	3	6	13	20	45	−25	15	Relegated

=== Mellersta Götaland 2004 ===
Pos	Team	Pld	W	D	L	GF	GA	GD	Pts	Promotion or relegation
1	Lindome GIF	22	14	4	4	59	34	+25	46	Promoted
2	Varbergs GIF FF	22	12	4	6	59	33	+26	40	Promotion Playoffs
3	IFK Fjärås	22	12	2	8	60	41	+19	38	
4	Annelunds IF, Ljung	22	11	4	7	59	44	+15	37	
5	Herrljunga SK FK	22	11	4	7	36	37	−1	37	
6	Lundens AIS, Göteborg	22	11	3	8	51	41	+10	36	
7	Svenljunga IK	22	10	4	8	39	31	+8	34	
8	Ulricehamns IFK	22	8	4	10	41	46	−5	28	
9	Kållereds SK	22	8	4	10	28	46	−18	28	Relegation Playoffs – Relegated
10	Askims IK	22	7	5	10	38	40	−2	26	Relegated
11	Vara SK	22	4	4	14	34	74	−40	16	Relegated
12	Mariedals IK, Borås	22	2	2	18	26	63	−37	8	Relegated

=== Sydöstra Götaland 2004 ===
Pos	Team	Pld	W	D	L	GF	GA	GD	Pts	Promotion or relegation
1	Nybro IF	22	20	0	2	63	28	+35	60	Promoted
2	Kalmar AIK FK	22	14	4	4	54	29	+25	46	Promotion Playoffs
3	Rödeby AIF	22	13	2	7	66	38	+28	41	
4	Färjestadens GOIF	22	10	3	9	37	40	−3	33	
5	Växjö Norra IF	22	9	5	8	48	45	+3	32	
6	Lindsdals IF, Kalmar	22	10	2	10	39	42	−3	32	
7	Gullringens GoIF	22	9	4	9	42	35	+7	31	
8	Saxemara IF, Ronneby	22	9	1	12	42	49	−7	28	
9	Högby IF, Löttorp	22	7	6	9	35	44	−9	27	Relegation Playoffs – Relegated
10	Hovmantorps GoIF	22	4	5	13	25	43	−18	17	Relegated
11	Ronneby BK	22	5	2	15	33	56	−23	17	Relegated
12	Västerviks FF	22	4	2	16	26	61	−35	14	Relegated

=== Sydvästra Götaland 2004 ===
Pos	Team	Pld	W	D	L	GF	GA	GD	Pts	Promotion or relegation
1	VMA IK, Arkelstorp	22	11	5	6	45	23	+22	38	Promoted
2	Åhus Horna BK	22	10	8	4	33	30	+3	38	Promotion Playoffs
3	Markaryds IF	22	11	4	7	42	25	+17	37	
4	Ljungby IF	22	10	5	7	45	29	+16	35	
5	Snöstorp Nyhem FF, Halmstad	22	9	7	6	40	33	+7	34	
6	IS Halmia, Halmstad	22	8	7	7	38	31	+7	31	
7	IF Leikin, Halmstad	22	7	8	7	27	27	0	29	
8	IFÖ/Bromölla IF	22	8	5	9	30	35	−5	29	
9	Bors SK	22	7	7	8	33	41	−8	28	Relegation Playoffs – Relegated
10	Perstorps SK	22	8	3	11	37	44	−7	27	Relegated
11	Vinbergs IF	22	5	8	9	35	46	−11	23	Relegated
12	Bredaryds IK	22	3	3	16	22	63	−41	12	Relegated

=== Södra Götaland 2004 ===
Pos	Team	Pld	W	D	L	GF	GA	GD	Pts	Promotion or relegation
1	Helsingborgs Södra BIS	22	14	4	4	54	23	+31	46	Promoted
2	Limhamns IF	22	11	7	4	49	31	+18	40	Promotion Playoffs
3	Kirseberg IF, Malmö	22	9	5	8	38	29	+9	32	
4	GIF Nike, Lomma	22	8	8	6	35	26	+9	32	
5	Marieholms IS	22	9	5	8	40	48	−8	32	
6	Asmundtorps IF	22	8	7	7	36	36	0	31	
7	Ystads IF FF	22	9	3	10	36	27	+9	30	
8	Påarps GIF	22	8	6	8	42	37	+5	30	
9	Ödåkra IF	22	8	5	9	28	33	−5	29	Relegation Playoffs – Relegated
10	Klippans BIF	22	9	2	11	34	45	−11	29	Relegated
11	Svedala IF	22	7	3	12	41	59	−18	24	Relegated
12	Eslövs BK	22	2	5	15	23	62	−39	11	Relegated
