= 2005 Division 3 (Swedish football) =

Swedish League Division 3
- Season: 2005
- Champions: Skellefteå AIK FK; Ersboda SK; Hudiksvalls ABK; Värtans IK; Haningealliansens FF; Rynninge IK; Motala AIF FK; Lärje/Angereds IF; Skövde AIK; Ljungby IF; Varbergs BoIS FC; Malmö Anadolu BI
- Promoted: Re-structuring
- Relegated: Re-structuring

Statistics of Swedish football Division 3 for the 2005 season.

== League standings ==
=== Norra Norrland 2005 ===
Pos	Team	Pld	W	D	L	GF	GA	GD	Pts	Qualification or relegation
1	Skellefteå AIK FK	22	14	5	3	59	25	+34	47	
2	Infjärdens SK, Roknäs	22	13	3	6	53	31	+22	42	
3	Sävast AIF, Boden	22	11	6	5	31	21	+10	39	
4	Betsele IF, Lycksele	22	10	6	6	62	39	+23	36	Relegation Playoffs – Relegated
5	Bureå IF	22	9	6	7	27	27	0	33	Relegated
6	Morön BK	22	8	5	9	42	42	0	29	Relegated
7	Sunnanå SK, Skellefteå	22	8	4	10	37	44	−7	28	Relegated
8	Luleå SK	22	7	8	7	27	40	−13	29	Relegated
9	Notvikens IK	22	7	2	13	29	41	−12	23	Relegated
10	Haparanda FF	22	5	6	11	31	37	−6	21	Relegated2
11	Pol/Svanstein FF	22	5	5	12	22	36	−14	20	Relegated2
12	Hedens IF, Boden	22	5	4	13	27	64	−37	19	Relegated2

=== Mellersta Norrland 2005 ===
Pos	Team	Pld	W	D	L	GF	GA	GD	Pts	Qualification or relegation
1	Ersboda SK	22	17	3	2	67	25	+42	54	
2	Kubikenborgs IF, Sundsvall	22	12	3	7	49	42	+7	39	
3	Umedalens IF	22	11	5	6	47	31	+16	38	
4	IFK Sundsvall	22	9	8	5	45	29	+16	35	Relegation Playoffs
5	IFK Holmsund	22	9	7	6	41	30	+11	34	Relegated
6	Furunäs/Bullmark IK	22	9	6	7	48	35	+13	33	Relegated
7	Ope IF	22	9	4	9	41	44	−3	31	Relegated
8	Krokom/Dvärsätt IF	22	6	9	7	39	40	−1	27	Relegated
9	Stockviks FF, Sundsvall	22	7	4	11	30	42	−12	25	Relegated
10	Matfors IF	22	6	2	14	29	51	−22	20	Relegated2
11	IF Älgarna, Härnösand	22	5	3	14	29	58	−29	18	Relegated2
12	Graninge FF, Sollefteå	22	4	2	16	26	64	−38	14	Relegated2

=== Södra Norrland 2005 ===
Pos	Team	Pld	W	D	L	GF	GA	GD	Pts	Qualification or relegation
1	Hudiksvalls ABK	22	17	3	2	55	13	+42	54	
2	Brynäs IF FK, Gävle	22	12	3	7	40	25	+15	39	
3	Avesta AIK	22	12	2	8	35	35	0	38	
4	Forssa BK	22	12	1	9	42	32	+10	37	Relegation Playoffs – Relegated
5	Gestrike-Hammarby IF	22	10	3	9	37	31	+6	33	Relegated
6	Söderhamns FF	22	8	8	6	33	29	+4	32	Relegated
7	Edsbyns IF FF	22	9	5	8	35	33	+2	32	Relegated
8	Bollnäs GIF FF	22	8	4	10	43	42	+1	28	Relegated
9	Korsnäs IF FK, Falun	22	7	7	8	23	32	−9	28	Relegated
10	Sandvikens AIK FK	22	6	5	11	26	44	−18	23	Relegated2
11	Strands IF, Hudiksvall	22	6	4	12	24	36	−12	22	Relegated2
12	Ockelbo IF	22	1	3	18	20	61	−41	6	Relegated2

=== Norra Svealand 2005 ===
Pos	Team	Pld	W	D	L	GF	GA	GD	Pts	Qualification or relegation
1	Värtans IK, Stockholm	22	15	3	4	45	25	+20	48	
2	Gröndals IK	22	15	2	5	47	23	+24	47	
3	IFK Österåkers FK, Åkersberga	22	12	6	4	48	36	+12	42	
4	Vallentuna BK	22	12	4	6	56	34	+22	40	Relegation Playoffs
5	Spånga IS FK	22	7	8	7	41	35	+6	29	Relegated
6	IK Fyris, Uppsala	22	8	4	10	29	35	−6	28	Relegated
7	IFK Sollentuna	22	9	1	12	37	59	−22	28	Relegated
8	Segeltorps IF	22	7	5	10	36	43	−7	26	Relegated
9	Akropolis IF, Kista	22	6	7	9	35	37	−2	25	Relegated
10	BKV Norrtälje	22	7	4	11	45	48	−3	25	Relegated2
11	Storvreta IK	22	6	3	13	35	42	−7	21	Relegated2
12	Visby AIK	22	3	3	16	24	61	−37	12	Relegated2

=== Östra Svealand 2005 ===
Pos	Team	Pld	W	D	L	GF	GA	GD	Pts	Qualification or relegation
1	Haningealliansens FF	22	15	5	2	61	28	+33	50	
2	Arameiska-Syrianska KIF, Norsborg	22	15	4	3	65	24	+41	49	
3	Syrianska IF Kerburan, Västerås	22	13	4	5	53	31	+22	43	
4	Älvsjö AIK FF	22	11	3	8	49	33	+16	36	Relegation Playoffs – Relegated
5	Tyresö FF	22	9	5	8	49	50	−1	32	Relegated
6	Värmdö IF	22	10	2	10	47	48	−1	32	Relegated
7	Reymersholms IK, Stockholm	22	8	7	7	36	33	+3	31	Relegated
8	Enköpings IS	22	8	3	11	44	45	−1	27	Relegated
9	IFK Västerås FK	22	6	5	11	38	54	−16	23	Relegated
10	Nykvarns SK	22	7	1	14	45	61	−16	22	Relegated2
11	Gideonsberg IF, Västerås	22	3	5	14	23	67	−44	14	Relegated2
12	Rapa-Nui FK, Vårby	22	3	4	15	27	63	−36	13	Relegated2

=== Västra Svealand 2005 ===
Pos	Team	Pld	W	D	L	GF	GA	GD	Pts	Qualification or relegation
1	Rynninge IK, Örebro	22	14	6	2	59	21	+38	48	
2	IFK Eskilstuna	22	14	2	6	44	33	+11	44	
3	Kungsör BK	22	12	6	4	56	35	+21	42	
4	Köping FF	22	13	3	6	52	33	+19	42	Relegation Playoffs – Relegated
5	Strömtorps IK	22	13	1	8	56	37	+19	40	Relegated
6	IFK Kumla	22	8	7	7	44	40	+4	31	Relegated
7	Värmbols FC, Katrineholm	22	7	7	8	31	39	−8	28	Relegated
8	Hertzöga BK, Karlstad	22	6	5	11	29	36	−7	23	Relegated
9	Ludvika FK	22	6	3	13	25	50	−25	21	Relegated
10	Frövi IK	22	4	5	13	34	48	−14	17	Relegated2
11	Eskilstuna Södra FF	22	4	5	13	22	56	−34	17	Relegated2
12	Eneby BK, Norrköping	22	4	4	14	42	66	−24	16	Relegated2

=== Nordöstra Götaland 2005 ===
Pos	Team	Pld	W	D	L	GF	GA	GD	Pts	Qualification or relegation
1	Motala AIF FK	22	16	3	3	65	23	+42	51	
2	IK Tord, Jönköping	22	16	2	4	48	30	+18	50	
3	Ulricehamns IFK	22	11	6	5	57	32	+25	39	
4	Linköpings FF	22	11	4	7	46	28	+18	37	Relegation Playoffs
5	IF Hagapojkarna, Jönköping	22	11	4	7	28	32	−4	37	Relegated
6	Gullringens GoIF	22	10	3	9	40	40	0	33	Relegated
7	BK Derby/Wolfram, Linköping	22	9	4	9	50	32	+18	31	Relegated
8	Mjölby AI FF	22	8	7	7	28	25	+3	31	Relegated
9	Nässjö FF	22	8	3	11	35	38	−3	27	Relegated
10	Borens IK, Motala	22	5	5	12	24	37	−13	20	Relegated2
11	Kisa BK	22	5	2	15	24	65	−41	17	Relegated2
12	Hjulsbro IK, Linköping	22	0	1	21	14	77	−63	1	Relegated2

=== Nordvästra Götaland 2005 ===
Pos	Team	Pld	W	D	L	GF	GA	GD	Pts	Qualification or relegation
1	Lärje/Angereds IF	22	15	3	4	53	28	+25	48	
2	Lundby IF, Göteborg	22	13	3	6	54	28	+26	42	
3	Finlandia/Pallo IF, Göteborg	22	11	5	6	36	24	+12	38	
4	KF Velebit, Hisings-Kärra	22	10	5	7	42	36	+6	35	Relegation Playoffs – Relegated
5	Ytterby IS, Kungälv	22	10	4	8	48	36	+12	34	Relegated
6	IK Kongahälla, Kungälv	22	9	7	6	40	30	+10	34	Relegated
7	Åsebro IF, Mellerud	22	9	5	8	40	38	+2	32	Relegated
8	Slottskogen/Godhem IF, Göteborg	22	8	3	11	27	41	−14	27	Relegated
9	Grebbestads IF	22	5	9	8	30	38	−8	24	Relegated
10	Lundens AIS, Göteborg	22	6	5	11	27	33	−6	23	Relegated2
11	IFK Trollhättan	22	6	4	12	22	42	−20	22	Relegated2
12	Inlands IF	22	2	3	17	19	64	−45	9	Relegated2

=== Mellersta Götaland 2005 ===
Pos	Team	Pld	W	D	L	GF	GA	GD	Pts	Qualification or relegation
1	Skövde AIK	22	18	2	2	62	23	+39	56	
2	Jonsereds IF	22	16	3	3	60	17	+43	51	
3	Tibro AIK FK	22	10	6	6	41	38	+3	36	
4	Holmalunds IF, Alingsås	22	9	7	6	37	30	+7	34	Relegation Playoffs – Relegated
5	Svenljunga IK	22	8	6	8	39	33	+6	30	Relegated
6	Fässbergs IF, Mölndal	22	8	6	8	32	27	+5	30	Relegated
7	Annelunds IF, Ljung	22	8	4	10	39	50	−11	28	Relegated
8	IFK Falköping FF	22	6	7	9	30	27	+3	25	Relegated
9	Gerdskens BK, Alingsås	22	6	7	9	25	39	−14	25	Relegated
10	Öckerö IF	22	6	3	13	40	50	−10	21	Relegated2
11	Herrljunga SK FK	22	5	4	13	30	56	−26	19	Relegated2
12	Tidaholms GoIF	22	3	3	16	24	69	−45	12	Relegated2

=== Sydöstra Götaland 2005 ===
Pos	Team	Pld	W	D	L	GF	GA	GD	Pts	Qualification or relegation
1	Ljungby IF	22	13	4	5	57	36	+21	43	
2	Karlskrona AIF	22	13	3	6	45	27	+18	42	
3	Rydaholms GoIF	22	11	6	5	49	33	+16	39	
4	Rödeby AIF	22	12	2	8	54	36	+18	38	Relegation Playoffs – Relegated
5	Växjö Norra IF	22	11	5	6	42	28	+14	38	Relegated
6	Saxemara IF, Ronneby	22	9	4	9	39	45	−6	31	Relegated
7	Färjestadens GoIF	22	8	5	9	46	52	−6	29	Relegated
8	Lindsdals IF, Kalmar	22	8	4	10	31	35	−4	28	Relegated
9	Kalmar AIK FK	22	7	6	9	28	30	−2	27	Relegated
10	Vetlanda FF	22	7	6	9	40	45	−5	27	Relegated2
11	Sandsbro AIK, Växjö	22	5	5	12	22	40	−18	20	Relegated2
12	Växjö BK	22	1	4	17	20	66	−46	7	Relegated2

=== Sydvästra Götaland 2005 ===
Pos	Team	Pld	W	D	L	GF	GA	GD	Pts	Qualification or relegation
1	Varbergs BoIS FC	22	13	5	4	45	28	+17	44	
2	Sölvesborgs GoIF	22	12	7	3	44	23	+21	43	
3	Påarps GIF	22	11	7	4	43	25	+18	40	
4	Varbergs GIF FF	22	11	7	4	46	32	+14	40	Relegation Playoffs – Relegated
5	Markaryds IF	22	10	2	10	34	27	+7	32	Relegated
6	IS Halmia, Halmstad	22	10	2	10	41	41	0	32	Relegated
7	Åhus Horna BK	22	8	3	11	38	43	−5	27	Relegated
8	IF Leikin, Halmstad	22	6	8	8	29	34	−5	26	Relegated
9	Snöstorp Nyhem FF, Halmstad	22	7	5	10	35	45	−10	26	Relegated
10	IFK Fjärås	22	7	3	12	39	46	−7	24	Relegated2
11	IFÖ/Bromölla IF	22	5	5	12	30	44	−14	20	Relegated2
12	Hörvikens IF, Sölvesborg	22	4	2	16	19	55	−36	14	Relegated2

=== Södra Götaland 2005 ===
Pos	Team	Pld	W	D	L	GF	GA	GD	Pts	Qualification or relegation
1	Malmö Anadolu BI	22	15	4	3	60	27	+33	49	
2	Asmundtorps IF	22	12	4	6	51	29	+22	40	
3	Kirseberg IF	22	11	6	5	43	25	+18	39	
4	Gantofta IF	22	11	6	5	48	40	+8	39	Relegation Playoffs
5	GIF Nike, Lomma	22	9	8	5	47	33	+14	35	Relegated
6	BK Näset/Höllviken	22	9	2	11	33	36	−3	29	Relegated
7	Limhamns IF	22	7	5	10	43	36	+7	26	Relegated
8	Tomelilla IF	22	7	5	10	32	35	−3	26	Relegated
9	Ystads IF FF	22	7	5	10	30	37	−7	26	Relegated
10	Marieholms IS	22	7	5	10	35	44	−9	26	Relegated2
11	Svalövs BK	22	6	2	14	27	51	−24	20	Relegated2
12	Lunds SK	22	4	2	16	15	71	−56	14	Relegated2
