= 2003 Division 3 (Swedish football) =

Swedish League Division 3
- Season: 2003
- Champions: Luleå SK; Anundsjö IF; Sandvikens IF; Gamla Uppsala SK; Enskede IK; Västerås IK; Nyköpings BIS; IK Oddevold; Norrby IF; Oskarshamns AIK; Kinna IF; Malmö Anadolu BI
- Promoted: 12 teams above and: Carlstad United BK
- Relegated: 44 teams

Statistics of Swedish football Division 3 for the 2003 season.

== League standings ==
=== Norra Norrland 2003 ===
Pos	Team	Pld	W	D	L	GF	GA	GD	Pts	Promotion or relegation
1	Luleå SK	22	17	0	5	56	30	+26	51	Promoted
2	Infjärdens SK, Roknäs	22	15	0	7	63	30	+33	45	Promotion Playoffs
3	Betsele IF	22	14	2	6	49	41	+8	44	
4	Sunderby SK, Södra Sunderbyn	22	11	5	6	48	33	+15	38	
5	Sävar IK	22	11	3	8	61	42	+19	36	
6	Gammelstads IF, Luleå	22	11	1	10	60	52	+8	34	
7	Sävast AIF, Boden	22	9	5	8	56	44	+12	32	
8	Polcirkeln/Svanstein FF, Juoksengi	22	10	2	10	49	39	+10	32	
9	Morön BK, Skellefteå	22	10	1	11	50	56	−6	31	Relegation Playoffs – Relegated
10	Burträsk IK	22	6	0	16	35	94	−59	18	Relegated
11	Malmbergets AIF	22	4	1	17	32	63	−31	13	Relegated
12	Älvsby IF	22	4	0	18	31	66	−35	12	Relegated

=== Mellersta Norrland 2003 ===
Pos	Team	Pld	W	D	L	GF	GA	GD	Pts	Promotion or relegation
1	Anundsjö IF, Bredbyn	22	12	3	7	50	40	+10	39	Promoted
2	Harmångers IF	22	11	4	7	46	29	+17	37	Promotion Playoffs
3	Stockviks FF	22	10	6	6	43	32	+11	36	
4	Furunäs/Bullmark IK	22	9	9	4	42	37	+5	36	
5	IFK Sundsvall	22	9	7	6	53	38	+15	34	
6	Gimonïäs CK, Umeå	22	10	3	9	42	39	+3	33	
7	IFK Holmsund	22	9	5	8	40	36	+4	32	
8	Hägglunds IoFK, Örnsköldsvik	22	8	5	9	40	41	−1	29	
9	Alnö IF	22	7	6	9	35	39	−4	27	Relegation Playoffs
10	Umedalens IF, Umeå	22	6	4	12	27	52	−25	22	Relegated
11	Sandviks IK, Holmsund	22	5	6	11	27	44	−17	21	Relegated
12	Sörfors IF	22	4	6	12	25	43	−18	18	Relegated

=== Södra Norrland 2003 ===
Pos	Team	Pld	W	D	L	GF	GA	GD	Pts	Promotion or relegation
1	Sandvikens IF	22	19	3	0	66	12	+54	60	Promoted
2	Söderhamns FF	22	16	3	3	58	22	+36	51	Promotion Playoffs
3	Viksjöfors IF FF, Edsbyn	22	9	8	5	38	28	+10	35	
4	Brynïäs IF FK, Gävle	22	10	4	8	36	31	+5	34	
5	Strands IF, Hudiksvall	22	9	5	8	32	30	+2	32	
6	Hudiksvalls ABK	22	9	1	12	45	39	+6	28	
7	Ytterhogdals IK	22	6	7	9	40	42	−2	25	
8	Gestrike-Hammarby IF	22	7	3	12	28	46	−18	24	
9	Kvarnsvedens IK	22	5	8	9	30	47	−17	23	Relegation Playoffs – Relegated
10	Islingby IK	22	4	8	10	23	33	−10	20	Relegated
11	Dala-Järna IK	22	4	7	11	21	45	−24	19	Relegated
12	Högbo AIK, Sandviken	22	4	3	15	24	66	−42	15	Relegated

=== Norra Svealand 2003 ===
Pos	Team	Pld	W	D	L	GF	GA	GD	Pts	Promotion or relegation
1	Gamla Uppsala SK	22	16	2	4	50	21	+29	50	Promoted
2	Bollstanäs SK	22	15	2	5	52	29	+23	47	Promotion Playoffs
3	IFK Sollentuna	22	14	0	8	46	36	+10	42	
4	Enköpings IS	22	12	4	6	46	33	+13	40	
5	IF Vindhemspojkarna, Uppsala	22	10	5	7	56	34	+22	35	
6	IK Fyris, Uppsala	22	10	2	10	44	44	0	32	
7	Heby AIF	22	10	2	10	33	39	−6	32	
8	Värtans IK, Stockholm	22	9	3	10	50	40	+10	30	
9	IK Frej, Täby	22	8	3	11	35	42	−7	27	Relegation Playoffs
10	Ängby IF	22	6	6	10	35	46	−11	24	Relegated
11	IFK Lidingö FK	22	5	2	15	30	60	−30	17	Relegated
12	Visby AIK	22	1	1	20	18	71	−53	4	Relegated

=== Östra Svealand 2003 ===
Pos	Team	Pld	W	D	L	GF	GA	GD	Pts	Promotion or relegation
1	Enskede IK	22	16	5	1	62	18	+44	53	Promoted
2	Älvsjö AIK FF	22	11	7	4	45	26	+19	40	Promotion Playoffs
3	Enhörna IF	22	11	3	8	49	34	+15	36	
4	Värmdö IF	22	11	3	8	34	37	−3	36	
5	Huddinge IF	22	10	5	7	37	27	+10	35	
6	Arameiska-Syrianska KIF, Norsborg	22	10	5	7	44	38	+6	35	
7	Spånga IS FK	22	8	7	7	35	29	+6	31	
8	Hammarby Talang FF, Stockholm	22	9	3	10	49	44	+5	30	
9	Älta IF	22	8	2	12	42	45	−3	26	Relegation Playoffs
10	Bagarmossen BK	22	5	6	11	31	51	−20	21	Relegated
11	Bromstens IK	22	3	5	14	35	60	−25	14	Relegated
12	Gustavsbergs IF	22	3	3	16	22	76	−54	12	Relegated

=== Västra Svealand 2003 ===
Pos	Team	Pld	W	D	L	GF	GA	GD	Pts	Promotion or relegation
1	Västerås IK	22	15	2	5	57	27	+30	47	Promoted
2	Carlstad United BK	22	13	4	5	36	26	+10	43	Promotion Playoffs – Promoted
3	Kungsör BK	22	12	5	5	65	44	+21	41	
4	Örebro SK Ungdom	22	12	3	7	45	29	+16	39	
5	Syrianska IF Kerburan, Västerås	22	9	5	8	44	38	+6	32	
6	IFK Eskilstuna	22	10	2	10	45	54	−9	32	
7	Eskilstuna Södra FF	22	7	6	9	31	31	0	27	
8	SK Sifhälla, Säffle	22	7	5	10	32	48	−16	26	
9	Rottneros IK	22	7	4	11	29	42	−13	25	Relegation Playoffs – Relegated
10	Adolfsbergs IK, Örebro	22	7	2	13	30	40	−10	23	Relegated
11	KB Karlskoga FF	22	4	7	11	25	47	−22	19	Relegated
12	Säffle FF	22	3	7	12	35	48	−13	16	Relegated

=== Nordöstra Götaland 2003 ===
Pos	Team	Pld	W	D	L	GF	GA	GD	Pts	Promotion or relegation
1	Nyköpings BIS	22	16	5	1	84	27	+57	53	Promoted
2	BK Wolfram, Linköping	22	14	4	4	49	33	+16	46	Promotion Playoffs
3	Mjölby AI FF	22	13	2	7	42	29	+13	41	
4	Hjulsbro IK, Linköping	22	12	4	6	50	30	+20	40	
5	Gullringens GoIF	22	11	5	6	43	41	+2	38	
6	LSW IF, Motala	22	11	2	9	54	44	+10	35	
7	Västerviks FF	22	8	5	9	57	62	−5	29	
8	IK Ramunder, Söderköping	22	7	2	13	41	43	−2	23	
9	Eneby BK, Norrköping	22	6	4	12	35	61	−26	22	Relegation Playoffs – Relegated
10	Kisa BK	22	6	3	13	31	53	−22	21	Relegated
11	Malmslätts AIK	22	2	7	13	31	58	−27	13	Relegated
12	Hultsfreds FK	22	4	1	17	36	72	−36	13	Relegated

=== Nordvästra Götaland 2003 ===
Pos	Team	Pld	W	D	L	GF	GA	GD	Pts	Promotion or relegation
1	IK Oddevold, Uddevalla	22	14	5	3	61	23	+38	47	Promoted
2	Lärje/Angereds IF	22	11	4	7	55	31	+24	37	Promotion Playoffs
3	IFK Trollhättan	22	11	4	7	46	34	+12	37	
4	Kållereds SK	22	10	6	6	33	22	+11	36	
5	Askims IK	22	10	4	8	44	36	+8	34	
6	Åsebro IF	22	8	6	8	34	42	−8	30	
7	Finlandia/Pallo IF, Göteborg	22	8	3	11	33	40	−7	27	
8	KF Velebit, Hisings-Kärra	22	8	3	11	26	33	−7	27	
9	Mossens BK, Göteborg	22	7	6	9	31	41	−10	27	Relegation Playoffs – Relegated
10	IF Väster, Västra Frölunda	22	7	4	11	29	45	−16	25	Relegated
11	Vallens IF, Spekeröd	22	7	2	13	27	43	−16	23	Relegated
12	IFK Uddevalla	22	5	5	12	31	60	−29	20	Relegated

=== Mellersta Götaland 2003 ===
Pos	Team	Pld	W	D	L	GF	GA	GD	Pts	Promotion or relegation
1	Norrby IF, Borås	22	15	3	4	61	29	+32	48	Promoted
2	IF Hagapojkarna, Jönköping	22	12	3	7	55	38	+17	39	Promotion Playoffs
3	IF Heimer, Lidköping	22	11	4	7	50	38	+12	37	
4	Mariedals IK, Borås	22	11	2	9	37	31	+6	35	
5	Tenhults IF	22	10	3	9	47	37	+10	33	
6	Vara SK	22	10	3	9	46	41	+5	33	
7	Herrljunga SK FK	22	9	3	10	54	59	−5	30	
8	Ulricehamns IFK	22	8	6	8	42	50	−8	30	
9	IFK Mariestad	22	9	1	12	46	54	−8	28	Relegation Playoffs – Relegated
10	Ulvåkers IF	22	8	3	11	40	47	−7	27	Relegated
11	Gerdskens BK, Alingsås	22	5	6	11	25	48	−23	21	Relegated
12	Tibro AIK FK	22	4	3	15	28	59	−31	15	Relegated

=== Sydöstra Götaland 2003 ===
Pos	Team	Pld	W	D	L	GF	GA	GD	Pts	Promotion or relegation
1	Oskarshamns AIK	22	15	5	2	54	17	+37	50	Promoted
2	Nybro IF	22	15	3	4	68	24	+44	48	Promotion Playoffs
3	IFÖ/Bromölla IF	22	15	2	5	57	29	+28	47	
4	VMA IK, Arkelstorp	22	11	5	6	49	34	+15	38	
5	Färjestadens GoIF	22	10	2	10	54	44	+10	32	
6	Lindsdals IF	22	10	2	10	36	44	−8	32	
7	Hovmantorps GIF	22	9	3	10	29	47	−18	30	
8	Saxemara IF	22	7	5	10	49	57	−8	26	
9	Ronneby BK	22	7	3	12	42	49	−7	24	Relegation Playoffs
10	Hvetlanda GIF, Vetlanda	22	6	5	11	37	51	−14	23	Relegated
11	Sölvesborgs GoIF	22	6	4	12	39	48	−9	22	Relegated
12	Jämshögs IF	22	0	3	19	13	83	−70	3	Relegated

=== Sydvästra Götaland 2003 ===
Pos	Team	Pld	W	D	L	GF	GA	GD	Pts	Promotion or relegation
1	Kinna IF	22	14	3	5	57	38	+19	45	Promoted
2	IS Halmia, Halmstad	22	13	3	6	39	26	+13	42	Promotion Playoffs
3	Varbergs GIF FK	22	12	3	7	58	38	+20	39	
4	IFK Fjärås	22	11	2	9	46	37	+9	35	
5	Vinbergs IF	22	10	4	8	50	40	+10	34	
6	IF Leikin, Halmstad	22	9	4	9	36	38	−2	31	
7	Bredaryds IK	22	8	6	8	36	38	−2	30	
8	Perstorps SK	22	8	4	10	43	48	−5	28	
9	Alvesta GoIF	22	7	6	9	32	37	−5	27	Relegation Playoffs – Relegated
10	Varbergs BoIS FC	22	6	7	9	31	34	−3	25	Relegated
11	Älmhults IF	22	5	5	12	31	50	−19	20	Relegated
12	Limmareds IF	22	4	3	15	23	58	−35	15	Relegated

=== Södra Götaland 2003 ===
Pos	Team	Pld	W	D	L	GF	GA	GD	Pts	Promotion or relegation
1	Malmö Anadolu BI	22	16	2	4	57	18	+39	50	Promoted
2	Kirseberg IF, Malmö	22	14	3	5	41	22	+19	45	Promotion Playoffs
3	Påarps GIF	22	11	5	6	52	39	+13	38	
4	Helsingborg Södra BIS	22	11	3	8	39	34	+5	36	
5	Asmundstorps IF	22	11	1	10	25	35	−10	34	
6	Eslövs BK	22	10	2	10	37	38	−1	32	
7	GIF Nike, Malmö	22	9	4	9	45	35	+10	31	
8	Ödåkra IF	22	8	4	10	36	41	−5	28	
9	FBK Balkan, Malmö	22	8	2	12	38	51	−13	26	Relegation Playoffs
10	Kulladals FF	22	6	6	10	36	43	−7	24	Relegated
11	Svalövs BK	22	7	3	12	26	35	−9	24	Relegated
12	IFK Trelleborg	22	3	1	18	24	65	−41	10	Relegated
