= 1999 Division 3 (Swedish football) =

Swedish League Division 3
- Season: 1999
- Champions: Robertsfors IK; IFK Timrå; Slätta SK; IF Vindhemspojkarna; Syrianska Föreningen; Eskilstuna Södra FF; Malmslätts AIK; Ytterby IS; Tidaholms GoIF; Karlskrona AIF; Jönköping Södra IF; Helsingborgs Södra BIS
- Promoted: 12 teams above
- Relegated: 48 teams

Statistics of Swedish football Division 3 for the 1999 season.

== League standings ==
=== Norra Norrland 1999 ===
Pos	Team	Pld	W	D	L	GF	GA	GD	Pts	Promotion or relegation
1	Robertsfors IK	22	15	4	3	46	12	+34	49	Promoted
2	IFK Kalix	22	12	7	3	36	13	+23	43	
3	Gammelstads IF	22	13	4	5	42	26	+16	43	
4	IFK Luleå	22	11	4	7	39	25	+14	37	
5	Malmbergets AIF	22	8	7	7	26	25	+1	31	
6	Betsele IF	22	9	4	9	43	44	−1	31	
7	Haparanda FF	22	7	10	5	20	30	−10	31	
8	Hedens IF, Boden	22	8	5	9	39	32	+7	29	
9	Storfors AIK	22	8	5	9	36	33	+3	29	Relegated
10	Luleå SK	22	4	4	14	20	46	−26	16	Relegated
11	Alviks IK, Luleå	22	3	6	13	24	49	−25	15	Relegated
12	IFK Ålund	22	3	2	17	25	61	−36	11	Relegated

=== Mellersta Norrland 1999 ===
Pos	Team	Pld	W	D	L	GF	GA	GD	Pts	Promotion or relegation
1	IFK Timrå	22	13	7	2	42	24	+18	46	Promoted
2	Umedalens IF, Umeå	22	12	4	6	53	37	+16	40	
3	IFK Sundsvall	22	12	4	6	48	36	+12	40	
4	Gimonäs CK	22	11	6	5	47	35	+12	39	
5	Matfors IF	22	11	4	7	54	32	+22	37	
6	IF Älgarna, Härnösand	22	9	6	7	38	31	+7	33	
7	Sävar IK	22	8	8	6	48	41	+7	32	
8	Anundsjö IF	22	10	2	10	37	40	−3	32	
9	Krokom/Dvärsätts IF	22	9	2	11	39	41	−2	29	Relegated
10	Ope IF	22	7	5	10	27	27	0	26	Relegated
11	Arnäs IF	22	2	3	17	21	64	−43	9	Relegated
12	Furunäs/Bullmarks IK	22	1	3	18	21	67	−46	6	Relegated

=== Södra Norrland 1999 ===
Pos	Team	Pld	W	D	L	GF	GA	GD	Pts	Promotion or relegation
1	Slätta SK, Falun	22	14	4	4	50	25	+25	46	Promoted
2	Gestrike-Hammarby IF	22	12	8	2	50	28	+22	44	
3	Bollnäs GoIF FF	22	14	1	7	52	32	+20	43	
4	Falu BS	22	12	5	5	63	30	+33	41	
5	Korsnäs IF	22	12	5	5	44	25	+19	41	
6	Hamrånge GIF	22	11	4	7	45	31	+14	37	
7	Forssa BK	22	9	9	4	32	30	+2	36	
8	Gimo IF	22	10	2	10	36	40	−4	32	
9	Enångers IK	22	6	1	15	32	58	−26	19	Relegated
10	Ytterhogdals IK	22	3	4	15	28	56	−28	13	Relegated
11	Säters IF	22	3	2	17	22	59	−37	11	Relegated
12	Kvarnsvedens IK	22	2	3	17	19	59	−40	9	Relegated

=== Norra Svealand 1999 ===
Pos	Team	Pld	W	D	L	GF	GA	GD	Pts	Promotion or relegation
1	IF Vindhemspojkarna, Uppsala	22	12	5	5	62	32	+30	41	Promoted
2	Topkapi IK, Stockholm	22	11	8	3	51	24	+27	41	
3	Valsta Syrianska IK, Märsta	22	11	8	3	41	27	+14	41	
4	Enebybergs IF	22	9	4	9	31	41	−10	31	
5	BKV Norrtälje	22	8	6	8	40	40	0	30	
6	IFK Österåker, Åkersberga	22	8	6	8	38	43	−5	30	
7	Bälinge IF	22	6	9	7	29	32	−3	27	
8	Heby AIF	22	6	8	8	36	36	0	26	
9	Ängby IF	22	7	5	10	35	40	−5	26	Relegated
10	Gamla Uppsala SK	22	6	8	8	27	33	−6	26	Relegated
11	Västerås IK	22	5	7	10	31	42	−11	22	Relegated
12	Upsala IF, Uppsala	22	3	6	13	29	60	−31	15	Relegated

=== Östra Svealand 1999 ===
Pos	Team	Pld	W	D	L	GF	GA	GD	Pts	Promotion or relegation
1	Syrianska Föreningen, Södertälje	22	16	5	1	50	15	+35	53	Promoted
2	Nyköpings BIS	22	12	6	4	47	23	+24	42	
3	Gustavsbergs IF	22	11	5	6	47	30	+17	38	
4	Bromstens IK	22	9	5	8	36	35	+1	32	
5	Hargs BK, Nyköping	22	9	4	9	50	40	+10	31	
6	FoC Farsta	22	8	6	8	32	25	+7	30	
7	Stureby SK	22	7	6	9	30	31	−1	27	
8	IFK Lidingö	22	8	3	11	28	31	−3	27	
9	Oxelösunds IK	22	8	3	11	24	42	−18	27	Relegated
10	IFK Stockholm	22	6	6	10	30	33	−3	24	Relegated
11	Älvsjö AIK FF	22	5	8	9	24	31	−7	23	Relegated
12	FC Plavi Team, Stockholm	22	3	3	16	20	82	−62	12	Relegated

=== Västra Svealand 1999 ===
Pos	Team	Pld	W	D	L	GF	GA	GD	Pts	Promotion or relegation
1	Eskilstuna Södra FF	22	15	3	4	90	27	+63	48	Promoted
2	IFK Ölme	22	14	5	3	66	26	+40	47	
3	Skiljebo SK, Västerås	22	14	3	5	55	37	+18	45	
4	Säffle FF	22	14	2	6	47	32	+15	44	
5	Arboga Södra IF	22	11	2	9	62	39	+23	35	
6	Köping FF	22	11	1	10	56	47	+9	34	
7	Karlslunds IF HFK, Örebro	22	10	3	9	45	34	+11	33	
8	IK Franke, Västerås	22	9	4	9	47	41	+6	31	
9	Garphyttans IF	22	10	1	11	49	44	+5	31	Relegated
10	Karlstad BK	22	6	2	14	27	49	−22	20	Relegated
11	IK Sturehov, Örebro	22	4	0	18	24	86	−62	12	Relegated
12	Lillåns IF	22	1	0	21	10	116	−106	3	Relegated

=== Nordöstra Götaland 1999 ===
Pos	Team	Pld	W	D	L	GF	GA	GD	Pts	Promotion or relegation
1	Malmslätts AIK	22	13	5	4	49	23	+26	44	Promoted
2	BK Zeros, Motala	22	11	5	6	47	41	+6	38	
3	Tenhults IF	22	11	4	7	60	32	+28	37	
4	BK Kenty, Linköping	22	10	6	6	32	22	+10	36	
5	Nässjö FF	22	11	2	9	45	34	+11	35	
6	Tranås FF	22	10	4	8	43	40	+3	34	
7	IK Ramunder, Söderköping	22	10	3	9	43	40	+3	33	
8	Lemunda/Starka Wiljor IF, Motala	22	7	8	7	32	36	−4	29	
9	Oskarshamns AIK	22	7	6	9	30	35	−5	27	Relegated
10	Aneby SK	22	8	3	11	34	48	−14	27	Relegated
11	Vetlanda FF	22	7	5	10	32	42	−10	26	Relegated
12	Hvetlanda GIF, Vetlanda	22	0	3	19	21	75	−54	3	Relegated

=== Nordvästra Götaland 1999 ===
Pos	Team	Pld	W	D	L	GF	GA	GD	Pts	Promotion or relegation
1	Ytterby IS	22	16	5	1	69	23	+46	53	Promoted
2	Skogens IF, Göteborg	22	15	3	4	42	15	+27	48	
3	Grebbestads IF	22	10	8	4	46	37	+9	38	
4	Lerkils IF	22	10	5	7	45	36	+9	35	
5	Vallens IF, Spekeröd	22	9	5	8	36	35	+1	32	
6	IFK Fjärås	22	8	6	8	44	40	+4	30	
7	Lysekils FF	22	8	6	8	32	33	−1	30	
8	Lundens AIS, Göteborg	22	8	4	10	38	44	−6	28	
9	Mossens BK, Göteborg	22	7	6	9	31	37	−6	27	Relegated
10	Åsa IF	22	4	7	11	27	50	−23	19	Relegated
11	Kungshamns IF	22	4	3	15	41	64	−23	15	Relegated
12	Näsets SK, Göteborg	22	2	4	16	27	61	−34	10	Relegated

=== Mellersta Götaland 1999 ===
Pos	Team	Pld	W	D	L	GF	GA	GD	Pts	Promotion or relegation
1	Tidaholms GoIF	22	14	6	2	59	17	+42	48	Promoted
2	Gerdskens BK	22	11	8	3	52	38	+14	41	
3	Skara FC	22	13	2	7	43	31	+12	41	
4	Vara SK	22	10	5	7	49	39	+10	35	
5	Jonsereds IF	22	9	5	8	44	27	+17	32	
6	Vänersborgs IF	22	9	4	9	30	34	−4	31	
7	Trollhättans BoIS	22	9	2	11	39	48	−9	29	
8	IFK Falköping	22	8	3	11	40	64	−24	27	
9	IFK Hällingsjö	22	7	3	12	40	54	−14	24	Relegated
10	Vårgårda IK	22	7	3	12	32	63	−31	24	Relegated
11	IFK Trollhättan	22	6	4	12	39	47	−8	22	Relegated
12	IFK Mariestad	22	6	1	15	25	53	−28	19	Relegated

=== Sydöstra Götaland 1999 ===
Pos	Team	Pld	W	D	L	GF	GA	GD	Pts	Promotion or relegation
1	Karlskrona AIF	22	16	4	2	52	19	+33	52	Promoted
2	Saxemara IF	22	15	2	5	43	18	+25	47	
3	Älmhults IF	22	11	4	7	41	26	+15	37	
4	Tomelilla IF	22	11	3	8	51	35	+16	36	
5	IFK Simrishamn	22	10	5	7	36	33	+3	35	
6	IFK Osby	22	11	2	9	37	35	+2	35	
7	IFK Karlshamn	22	10	2	10	51	43	+8	32	
8	Växjö BK	22	10	2	10	33	36	−3	32	
9	Högadals IS, Karlshamn	22	10	1	11	44	41	+3	31	Relegated
10	Färjestadens GoIF	22	3	6	13	23	46	−23	15	Relegated
11	Smedby BoIK, Kalmar	22	2	7	13	24	56	−32	13	Relegated
12	Hovmantorps GIF	22	2	4	16	18	65	−47	10	Relegated

=== Sydvästra Götaland 1999 ===
Pos	Team	Pld	W	D	L	GF	GA	GD	Pts	Promotion or relegation
1	Jönköping Södra IF	22	13	7	2	36	17	+19	46	Promoted
2	Varbergs GIF FF	22	12	5	5	52	27	+25	41	
3	Vinbergs IF	22	10	7	5	40	26	+14	37	
4	IFK Värnamo	22	9	8	5	37	32	+5	35	
5	Strömsnäsbruks IF	22	8	7	7	42	33	+9	31	
6	Smålandsstenars GIF	22	8	7	7	35	28	+7	31	
7	Varbergs BoIS	22	8	7	7	40	36	+4	31	
8	Kinna IF	22	9	4	9	40	41	−1	31	
9	Gislaveds IS	22	9	3	10	37	49	−12	30	Relegated
10	Limmareds IF	22	6	2	14	30	48	−18	20	Relegated
11	IF Hagapojkarna, Jönköping	22	5	3	14	28	49	−21	18	Relegated
12	Ulricehamns IFK	22	4	2	16	24	35	−11	14	Relegated

=== Södra Götaland 1999 ===
Pos	Team	Pld	W	D	L	GF	GA	GD	Pts	Promotion or relegation
1	Helsingborgs Södra BIS	22	15	5	2	51	20	+31	50	Promoted
2	Ängelholms FF	22	13	6	3	36	13	+23	45	
3	Bunkeflo IF	22	12	3	7	35	33	+2	39	
4	Klippans BIF	22	10	5	7	43	35	+8	35	
5	Kirsebergs IF, Malmö	22	9	5	8	39	29	+10	32	
6	Perstorps SK	22	8	7	7	43	39	+4	31	
7	Eslövs BK	22	9	4	9	40	38	+2	31	
8	Malmö BI	22	9	4	9	41	46	−5	31	
9	Härslövs IK	22	8	5	9	34	40	−6	29	Relegated
10	Skanör/Falsterbo IF	22	5	5	12	23	39	−16	20	Relegated
11	FBK Balkan, Malmö	22	2	8	12	27	49	−22	14	Relegated
12	BK Olympic, Malmö	22	2	3	17	23	54	−31	9	Relegated
