= Midnattsolscupen =

Annual football tournament in Sweden

Midnattsolscupen (Midnight Sun Cup) is a football tournament which is played annually in July in the Tornedalen (Norrbotten County) in northern Sweden.

== Background ==
The Midnattsolscupen tournament is organised by the Polcirkeln/Svanstein FF, Ohtana/Aapua FF and Korpilombolo GIF clubs. Games are played in the villages of Svanstein and Aapua in Övertorneå, and in Ohtanajärvi in Pajala. Most of the matches are played during the late evening and as the name suggests - midnight, taking full advantage of the light nights in Tornedalen. The Final match is played in Svanstein and usually attracts large crowds.

The rules state that the competing clubs are mostly from northern Sweden, Finland and Norway. However Russian teams Spartak Moscow and Stolitsa Moskva have also taken part in the tournament.

In addition to men's team tournament, there is also a competition for boys teams.

== Past winners ==
- 1982 IFK Tärendö
- 1983 Gällivare SK
- 1984 Gällivare SK
- 1985 Kiruna FF
- 1986 Grovfjord IL
- 1987 Notvikens IK
- 1988 Rutviks SK
- 1989 Rutviks SK
- 1990 Rutviks SK Vandringspris 1
- 1991 Assi IF
- 1992 Haparanda FF
- 1993 Haparanda FF
- 1994 FC Santa Claus
- 1995 Assi IF
- 1996 Kiruna FF
- 1997 Kiruna FF
- 1998 IFK Kalix
- 1999 Assi IF Vandringspris 2
- 2000 Spartak Moscow
- 2001 Malmbergets AIF
- 2002 Kiruna FF
- 2003 Polcirkeln/Svanstein FF
- 2004 Spartak Moskva
- 2005 Kiruna FF
- 2006 Spartak Moscow Vandringspris 3
- 2007 Spartak Moscow
- 2008 Kiruna FF
- 2009 Luleå SK
- 2010 Stolitsa Moskva
- 2011 Stolitsa Moskva
