= Abel Luckyfizzo Horton =

Liberian footballer

Abel Horton
Personal information
- Full name: Abel Luckyfizzo Horton
- Date of birth: 7 March 1995 (age 31)
- Place of birth: Monrovia, Liberia
- Height: 5 ft 0 in (1.52 m)
- Position: Attacking midfielder

Senior career*
Years	Team	Apps	(Gls)
2012–2014	LISCR FC		
2015–2016	KF Velebit	13	(5)
2017	Lärje-Angereds IF	9	(1)
2018	Clube de Desportos da Costa do Sol	9	(3)
2018–2019	S.C. Esmoriz	8	(2)

International career
2011–2013	Liberia U20		
2013–2014	Liberia U23		
2013	Liberia	1	(0)
- * Club domestic league appearances and goals

Abel Luckyfizzo Horton (born 7 March 1995) is a Liberian professional footballer who last played as an attacking midfielder or winger for Portuguese club S.C. Esmoriz and the Liberia national team.

== Club career ==
From 2012 to 2014, Horton played for LISCR FC. In 2015, he joined Swedish club KF Velebit on a one-year deal. He joined Swedish division two club Lärje-Angereds IF in 2017. In August 2018, he joined Mozambican topflight club Clube de Desportos da Costa do Sol. He joined Portuguese club S.C. Esmoriz in 2019.

== International career ==
Horton has represented Liberia at the under-20 and under-23 levels. In 2013, Horton accepted the call to play for the Liberian senior team in the qualifying rounds of the 2014 FIFA World Cup against the Angola.
