= Eskilstuna (disambiguation) =

Eskilstuna is the largest city and municipal seat of Eskilstuna Municipality, Södermanland County, Sweden.

Eskilstuna may also refer to:

- AFC Eskilstuna, Swedish football club in Eskilstuna, Sweden
- Eskilstuna City FK, Swedish football club in Eskilstuna, Sweden
- Eskilstuna Södra FF, Swedish football club in Eskilstuna, Sweden
- IFK Eskilstuna, Swedish football club in Eskiltuna, Sweden
- Ikaros Smederna, also known as Smederna Eskilstuna, Swedish speedway club in Eskilstuna, Sweden
