= Issy Pollard =

Association football player

Personal information
- Birth name: Isobel Pollard
- Date of birth: 2 December 1975 (age 50)
- Place of birth: Halifax, England
- Position: Defender

Youth career
- Bradford City

Senior career*
Years	Team	Apps	(Gls)
- Bradford City
1991–1993	Bronte		
1993–1994	Millwall Lionesses		
1994	Betsele IF		
1994–1995	Bronte		
1995–1997	Doncaster Belles		
1997–2003	Leeds United		

International career^{‡}
1992–1994	England	3	(0)
- * Club domestic league appearances and goals ‡ National team caps and goals as of 13:37, 4 December 2021 (UTC)

Isobel "Issy" Pollard (born 2 December 1975) is an English former footballer who played for the England women's national football team. She played for several clubs at FA Women's Premier League level and for Betsele IF in Sweden.

== Club career ==
Pollard played football at Old Town Primary School in Hebden Bridge. She was also an accomplished field hockey player, representing West Yorkshire Schools and Calderdale under-18s. After contacting the Women's Football Association (WFA) for a club, Pollard was put in touch with Yorkshire and Humberside League Bradford City, who she joined at youth level.

When the WFA formed a National League in 1991–92, Pollard wanted to play at the higher standard. She joined Bradford City's cross-town rivals Bronte, who had been admitted to the new Northern Division. Pollard's first goal for her new club was a 35-yard strike against Ipswich Town. Bronte narrowly beat Sheffield Wednesday to the title and took their place in an enlarged 10-team National Division for 1992–93.

Bronte's stalwart defender Clare Taylor left for Knowsley United in the close season and without her the team performed poorly in the top division. A violent altercation on the Bronte team bus saw Chantel Woodhead being throttled and Samantha Britton punching the assailant. The club were relegated and Pollard signed for Millwall Lionesses in the subsequent player exodus.

After brief spells in Sweden with Betsele IF and back at Bronte, Pollard was signed by Doncaster Belles in 1995. The transfer was agreed by outgoing manager Paul Edmunds prior to his departure, after Pollard attended a Doncaster Belles match as a guest of her former Bronte team-mate Chantel Woodhead. Pollard was the captain of the Leeds United team who reached the Women's FA Cup semi-final in 2000 and won promotion to the FA Women's Premier League National Division for the first time in 2001.

== International career ==
Pollard was called into the senior England women's national football team at 16 years old, on the recommendation of her Bronte team-mate Clare Taylor. She remained in the squad for UEFA Women's Euro 1995 qualifying when The Football Association had taken over the women's team, and was capped at senior level by Ted Copeland. After an "accomplished season" with Doncaster Belles she was recalled by England for their UEFA Women's Euro 1997 qualifying play-off defeat by Spain in September 1996.

She has England legacy number 96. The FA announced their legacy numbers scheme to honour the 50th anniversary of England’s inaugural international.

== Personal life ==
Pollard later started a dog walking business in Hebden Bridge called "Rocket Dogz". In April 2021 she opened a raw dog food outlet.
