= Olle Kullinger =

Swedish footballer

Personal information
- Full name: Olle Kullinger
- Date of birth: 5 August 1974 (age 52)
- Place of birth: Uppsala, Sweden
- Height: 1.85 m (6 ft 1 in)
- Position: Forward

Youth career
- IF Vindhemspojkarna

Senior career*
Years	Team	Apps	(Gls)
–2000	IF Vindhemspojkarna		
2001–2002	Enköpings SK	52	(27)
2003–2004	Halmstads BK	20	(5)
2004	→ IF Brommapojkarna (loan)	7	(5)
2005	IF Brommapojkarna	22	(6)
2006–2007	IK Sirius		
- * Club domestic league appearances and goals

Olle Kullinger (born 5 August 1974) is a Swedish retired footballer.

He was born in Uppsala in 1974, and started his career in IF Vindhemspojkarna. Later on he represented Enköpings SK in Superettan, Halmstads BK in Allsvenskan, IF Brommapojkarna in Superettan and IK Sirius. He retired from football in 2007.
