= Svanstein =

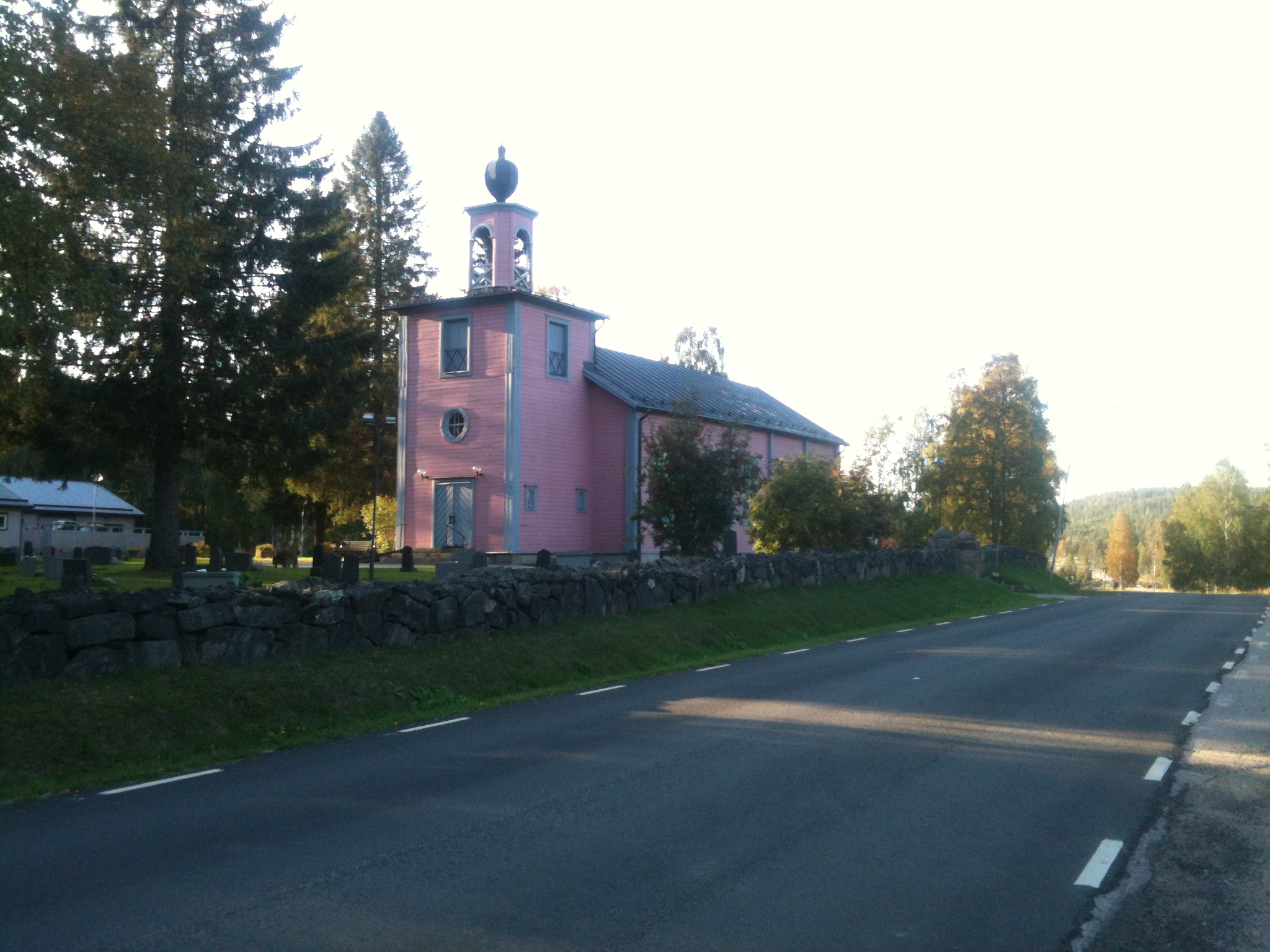

- Location within Norrbotten Location within Sweden
- Coordinates: 66°39′N 23°51′E
- Country: Sweden
- Province: Norrbotten
- County: Norrbotten County
- Municipality: Övertorneå Municipality

Area
  - Total: 1.23 km^{2} (0.47 sq mi)

Population (2005-12-31)
  - Total: 207
  - Density: 168/km^{2} (440/sq mi)
- Time zone: UTC+1 (CET)
  - Summer (DST): UTC+2 (CEST)

Svanstein (Swedish pronunciation: [ˈsvɑ̌ːnstɛjn]) (Meänkieli: Turtola) is a village situated in Övertorneå Municipality, Norrbotten County, Sweden with 207 inhabitants in 2005.
