= Haparanda FF =

Swedish football club

- Full name: Haparanda Fotbollsförening
- Nickname: HFF
- Founded: 1975
- Ground: Gränsvallen, Haparanda
- Capacity: 1500
- League: Swedish football Division 3 Norra Norrland
Home colours	Away colours

Haparanda FF is a football club located in Haparanda, Norrbotten County, Sweden.

== Background ==
Haparanda FF currently plays in Swedish football Division 4 Norra Norrland which is the sixth tier of Swedish football. They play their home matches at the Gränsvallen in Haparanda.

The club is affiliated to Norrbottens Fotbollförbund. Haparanda FF played in the 2006 Svenska Cupen but lost 1–3 (aet) at home to Sävast AIF in the first round. The club won the Midnattsolscupen (Midnight Sun Cup) in 1992 and 1993.

== Season to season ==
Season	Level	Division	Section	Position	Movements
1993	Tier 5	Division 4	Norrbotten Norra	4th	
1994	Tier 5	Division 4	Norrbotten Norra	4th	
1995	Tier 5	Division 4	Norrbotten Norra	2nd	Promotion Playoffs
1996	Tier 5	Division 4	Norrbotten Norra	6th	
1997	Tier 5	Division 4	Norrbotten Norra	7th	
1998	Tier 5	Division 4	Norrbotten Norra	2nd	Promotion Playoffs – Promoted
1999	Tier 4	Division 3	Norra Norrland	7th	
2000	Tier 4	Division 3	Norra Norrland	9th	
2001	Tier 4	Division 3	Norra Norrland	5th	
2002	Tier 4	Division 3	Norra Norrland	12th	Relegated
2003	Tier 5	Division 4	Norrbotten Norra	6th	
2004	Tier 5	Division 4	Norrbotten Norra	1st	Promotion Playoffs – Promoted
2005	Tier 4	Division 3	Norra Norrland	10th	Relegated
2006*	Tier 6	Division 4	Norrbotten Norra	6th	
2007	Tier 6	Division 4	Norrbotten Norra	4th	
2008	Tier 6	Division 4	Norrbotten Norra	7th	
2009	Tier 6	Division 4	Norrbotten Norra	5th	
2010	Tier 6	Division 4	Norrbotten Norra	6th	
2011	Tier 6	Division 4	Norrbotten Norra	2nd	Promotion Playoffs – Promoted
2012	Tier 5	Division 3	Norra Norrland	11th	Relegated
2013	Tier 6	Division 4	Norrbotten Norra	3rd	
2014	Tier 6	Division 4	Norrbotten Norra	1st	Promoted
2015	Tier 5	Division 3	Norra Norrland	12th	Relegated
2016	Tier 6	Division 4	Norrbotten Norra	5th	
2017	Tier 6	Division 4	Norrbotten Norra	10th	Relegated
2018	Tier 7	Division 5	Norrbotten Norra	2nd	Promotion Playoffs – Promoted
2019	Tier 6	Division 4	Norrbotten Norra	9th	
2020	Tier 6	Division 4	Norrbotten Norra	9th	

* League restructuring in 2006 resulted in a new division being created at Tier 3 and subsequent divisions dropping a level.
