= Notvikens IK =

Swedish football club

- Full name: Notvikens Idrottsklubb
- Short name: Notviken
- Founded: 6 October 1936
- Ground: Tunavallen; Luleå; Sweden
- Chairman: Mikael Pettersson
- League: Division 2 Norrland
- 2019: Division 3 Norra Norrland, 2nd (Promotion Playoffs - Promoted)
Home colours	Away colours

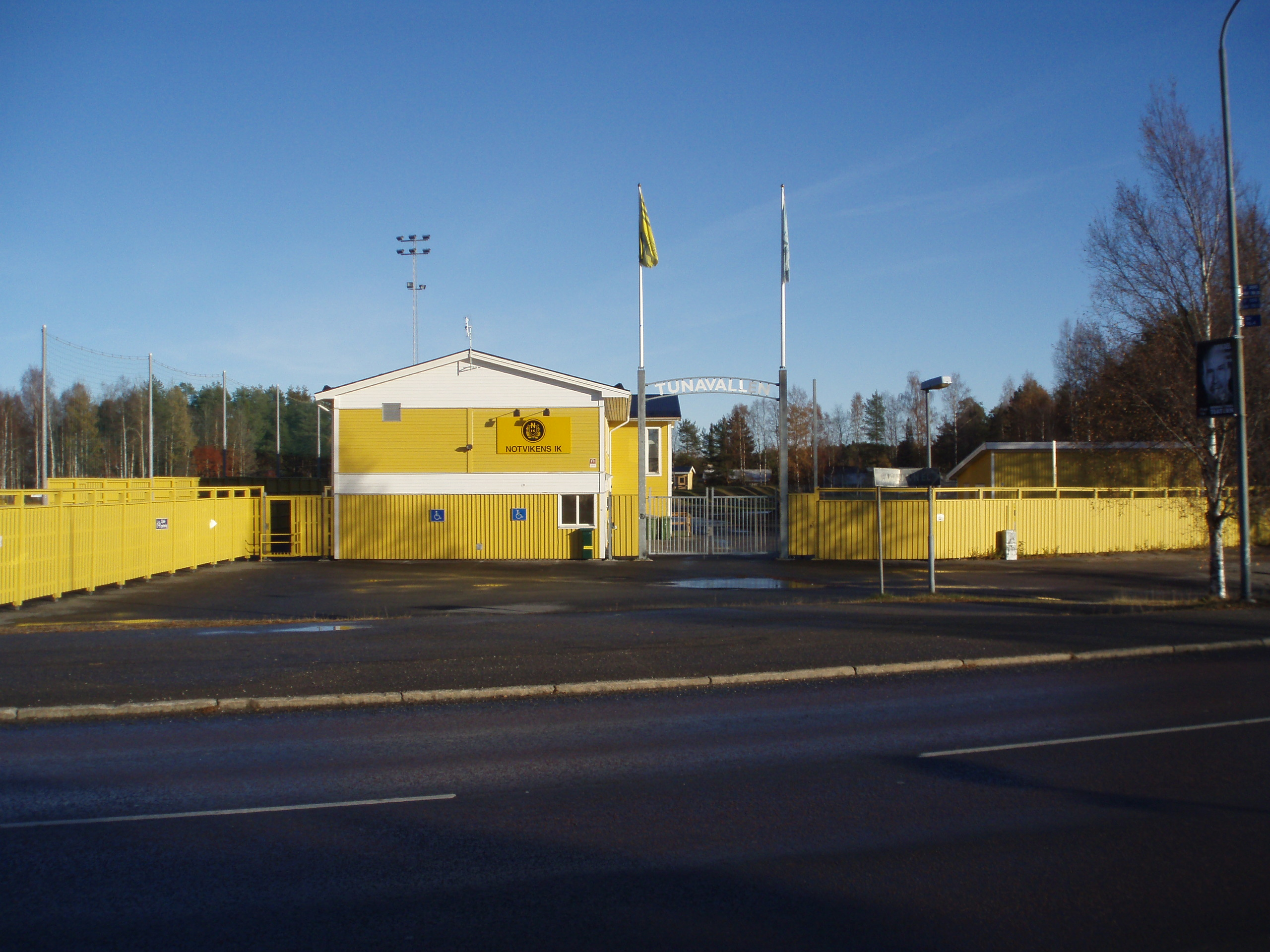
Tunavallen in 2009

Notvikens IK is a Swedish football club located in Luleå in Norrbotten County.

== Background ==
Since their foundation Notvikens IK has participated mainly in the middle and lower divisions of the Swedish football league system. The club currently plays in Division 3 Norra Norrland which is the fifth tier of Swedish football. They play their home matches at Tunavallen in Notviken, Luleå.

Notvikens IK are affiliated to the Norrbottens Fotbollförbund. The club won the Midnattsolscupen (Midnight Sun Cup) in 1987. The club won the DM in 2009.

== Season to season ==
Season	Level	Division	Section	Position	Movements
1996	Tier 5	Division 4	Norrbotten Norra	5th	
1997	Tier 5	Division 4	Norrbotten Norra	1st	Promoted
1998	Tier 4	Division 3	Norra Norrland	11th	Relegated
1999	Tier 5	Division 4	Norrbotten Norra	3rd	
2000	Tier 5	Division 4	Norrbotten Norra	2nd	Promotion Playoffs
2001	Tier 5	Division 4	Norrbotten Norra	1st	Promoted
2002	Tier 4	Division 3	Norra Norrland	11th	Relegated
2003	Tier 5	Division 4	Norrbotten Norra	2nd	Promotion Playoffs – Promoted
2004	Tier 4	Division 3	Norra Norrland	6th	
2005	Tier 4	Division 3	Norra Norrland	9th	
2006*	Tier 5	Division 3	Norra Norrland	3rd	
2007	Tier 5	Division 3	Norra Norrland	7th	
2008	Tier 5	Division 3	Norra Norrland	4th	
2009	Tier 5	Division 3	Norra Norrland	5th	
2010	Tier 5	Division 3	Norra Norrland	6th	
2011	Tier 5	Division 3	Norra Norrland	4th	
2012	Tier 5	Division 3	Norra Norrland	4th	
2013	Tier 5	Division 3	Norra Norrland	5th	
2014	Tier 5	Division 3	Norra Norrland	7th	
2015	Tier 5	Division 3	Norra Norrland	5th	
2016	Tier 5	Division 3	Norra Norrland	4th	
2017	Tier 5	Division 3	Norra Norrland	5th	
2018	Tier 5	Division 3	Norra Norrland	5th	
2019	Tier 5	Division 3	Norra Norrland	2nd	Promotion Playoffs - Promoted
2020	Tier 4	Division 2	Norrland		

* League restructuring in 2006 resulted in a new division being created at Tier 3 and subsequent divisions dropping a level.

== Attendances ==
In recent seasons Notvikens IK have had the following average attendances:

Season	Average attendance	Division / Section	Level
2005	135	Div 3 Norra Norrland	Tier 4
2006	133	Div 3 Norra Norrland	Tier 5
2007	114	Div 3 Norra Norrland	Tier 5
2008	121	Div 3 Norra Norrland	Tier 5
2009	123	Div 3 Norra Norrland	Tier 5
2010	109	Div 3 Norra Norrland	Tier 5
2011	117	Div 3 Norra Norrland	Tier 5
2012	103	Div 3 Norra Norrland	Tier 5
2013	92	Div 3 Norra Norrland	Tier 5
2014	72	Div 3 Norra Norrland	Tier 5
2015	90	Div 3 Norra Norrland	Tier 5
2016	87	Div 3 Norra Norrland	Tier 5
2017	92	Div 3 Norra Norrland	Tier 5
2018	101	Div 3 Norra Norrland	Tier 5
2019		Div 3 Norra Norrland	Tier 5
2020		Div 2 Norrland	Tier 4

* Attendances are provided in the Publikliga sections of the Svenska Fotbollförbundet website.
