= Strömtorps IK =

Swedish football club

- Full name: Strömtorps Idrottsklubb
- Founded: 1932
- Ground: Strömtorps IP, Degerfors
- Chairman: Sören Johansson
- League: Division 3 Mellersta Svealand
- 2024: Division 3 Nordvästra Götaland, 6th of 12
Home colours	Away colours

Strömtorps Idrottsklubb, commonly known as Strömtorps IK, is a Swedish football club located in the neighbourhood of Strömtorp in Degerfors.

== Background ==
Strömtorps IK is a sports club from Degerfors. The club was formed in April 1932, and football and skiing are its main sections.

Since its foundation, Strömtorps IK has participated mainly in the middle and lower divisions of the Swedish football league system. The club currently plays in Division 3, Västra Svealand, which is the fifth tier of Swedish football. They play their home matches at Strömtorps IP in Degerfors.

Strömtorps IK is affiliated with Värmlands Fotbollförbund.

== Recent history ==
In recent seasons Strömtorps IK has competed in the following divisions:

2011 – Division III, Västra Svealand
2010 – Division IV, Värmland
2009 – Division IV, Värmland
2008 – Division IV, Värmland
2007 – Division III, Västra Svealand
2006 – Division III, Västra Svealand
2005 – Division III, Västra Svealand
2004 – Division III, Västra Svealand
2003 – Division II, Västra Svealand
2002 – Division III, Västra Svealand
2001 – Division IV, Värmland
2000 – Division IV, Värmland
1999 – Division IV, Värmland

== Attendances ==
In recent seasons Strömtorps IK has had the following average attendances:

Season	Average attendance	Division / Section	Level
2008	Not available	Div 4 Värmland	Tier
2009	90	Div 4 Värmland	Tier
2010	131	Div 4 Värmland	Tier

* Attendances are provided in the Publikliga sections of the Svenska Fotbollförbundet website.

== Managers ==
- (Sweden) Ulf Ottosson
