= Ljungby IF =

Swedish football club

- Full name: Ljungby Idrottsförening
- Short name: LIF
- Founded: 1914
- Ground: Lagavallen; Ljungby; Sweden
- Capacity: 1,600
- Chairman: Jerry Andersson
- Head coach: Samir Hodzic
- Coach: Edin Velic
- League: Division 4 Sydvästra Småland
- 2019: Division 4 Sydvästra Småland
Home colours

Ljungby IF is a Swedish football club located in Ljungby. The club was founded on 1 April 1914.

== Background ==
Since their foundation Ljungby IF has participated mainly in the middle and lower divisions of the Swedish football league system. Their greatest sporting success came in 1999 when the club played a crucial qualifier for the Superettan against Östers IF before 3,725 spectators. Östers only won after extra time. Ljungby IF currently plays in Division 2 Södra Götaland which is the fourth tier of Swedish football. They play their home matches at the Lagavallen in Ljungby.

The club is the largest football club in Småland and is known for its large investment on the youth side supporting approximately 900 players of which around 250 are girls.

Ljungby IF are affiliated to the Smålands Fotbollförbund.

== Season to season ==
Season	Level	Division	Section	Position	Movements
1993	Tier 4	Division 3	Sydvästra Götaland	6th	
1994	Tier 4	Division 3	Sydöstra Götaland	4th	
1995	Tier 4	Division 3	Sydöstra Götaland	1st	Promoted
1996	Tier 3	Division 2	Östra Götaland	11th	Relegated
1997	Tier 4	Division 3	Sydvästra Götaland	2nd	Promotion Playoffs
1998	Tier 4	Division 3	Sydvästra Götaland	2nd	Promotion Playoffs – Promoted
1999	Tier 3	Division 2	Östra Götaland	1st	Promotion Playoffs
2000	Tier 3	Division 2	Östra Götaland	6th	
2001	Tier 3	Division 2	Södra Götaland	12th	Relegated
2002	Tier 4	Division 3	Sydvästra Götaland	2nd	Promotion Playoffs – Promoted
2003	Tier 3	Division 2	Södra Götaland	12th	Relegated
2004	Tier 4	Division 3	Sydvästra Götaland	4th	
2005	Tier 4	Division 3	Sydöstra Götaland	1st	Promoted
2006	Tier 4	Division 2	Mellersta Götaland	5th	
2007	Tier 4	Division 2	Mellersta Götaland	8th	
2008	Tier 4	Division 2	Östra Götaland	10th	Relegation Playoffs
2009	Tier 4	Division 2	Södra Götaland	8th	
2010	Tier 4	Division 2	Östra Götaland	9th	
2011	Tier 4	Division 2	Södra Götaland	3rd	
2012	Tier 4	Division 2	Östra Götaland	7th	
2013	Tier 4	Division 2	Södra Götaland		

* League restructuring in 2006 resulted in a new division being created at Tier 3 and subsequent divisions dropping a level.
