= Lunden ÖBK =

Swedish football club

- Full name: Lunden Överås Bollklubb
- Short name: LÖBK
- Founded: 2007
- Ground: Överåsvallen; Gothenburg; Sweden
- Chairman: Charlotte Ahlström
- Coach: Michel Berntsson Gonzalez
- Coach: Johan Dahlström
- League: Division 3 Mellersta Götaland
Home colours	Away colours

Lunden ÖBK is a Swedish football club located in Gothenburg.

== Background ==
Lunden Överås Bollklubb was formed in 2007 following the merger of Lundens AIS, Lundens Allmänna Idrottssällskap, with near neighbours Överås BK, Överås Bollklubb. Both clubs shared their home venue known as Överåsvallen in central / eastern Gothenburg. Lunden AIS was formed in 1930 and played many years in Division 4, but at the beginning of the 2000s progressed to Division 2 for two seasons before once again dropping down to Division 4. Lundens AIS competed in the Svenska Cupen on 20 occasions and played 32 matches in the competition.

Lunden ÖBK currently plays in Division 3A Mellersta Götaland which is the fifth tier of Swedish football. They play their home matches at the Överåsvallen in Göteborg.

The club is affiliated to Göteborgs Fotbollförbund.

== Season to season ==
Lundens AIS competed in the following divisions from 1993 to 2007:

Season	Level	Division	Section	Position	Movements
1993	Tier 5	Division 4	Göteborg A	7th	
1994	Tier 5	Division 4	Göteborg A	10th	
1995	Tier 5	Division 4	Göteborg A	7th	
1996	Tier 5	Division 4	Göteborg A	7th	
1997	Tier 5	Division 4	Göteborg A	1st	Promoted
1998	Tier 4	Division 3	Nordvästra Götaland	5th	
1999	Tier 4	Division 3	Nordvästra Götaland	8th	
2000	Tier 4	Division 3	Nordvästra Götaland	5th	
2001	Tier 4	Division 3	Nordvästra Götaland	1st	Promoted
2002	Tier 3	Division 2	Västra Götaland	9th	
2003	Tier 3	Division 2	Västra Götaland	11th	Relegated
2004	Tier 4	Division 3	Mellersta Götaland	6th	
2005	Tier 4	Division 3	Nordvästra Götaland	10th	Relegated
2006*	Tier 6	Division 4	Göteborg A	3rd	
2007	Tier 6	Division 4	Göteborg A	2nd	Promotion Playoffs

* League restructuring in 2006 resulted in a new division being created at Tier 3 and subsequent divisions dropping a level.

The new club Lunden ÖBK have competed in the following divisions since 2008:

Season	Level	Division	Section	Position	Movements
2008	Tier 6	Division 4	Göteborg A	3rd	
2009	Tier 6	Division 4	Göteborg A	4th	
2010	Tier 6	Division 4	Göteborg A	3rd	
2011	Tier 6	Division 4	Göteborg A	6th	
2023	Tier 6	Division 4	Göteborg A	1st	Promoted
2024	Tier 5	Division 3	Mellersta Götaland	N/A	

== Current squad ==
Note: Flags indicate national team as defined under FIFA eligibility rules; some limited exceptions apply. Players may hold more than one non-FIFA nationality.

No.	Pos.	Nation	Player
1	GK	SWE	Rickard Ekdahl
2	MF	SWE	Martin Olsson
3	DF	SWE	Oscar Thörnbring
4	DF	SWE	Joakim Wikström
5	MF	SWE	Erik Alvhede
7	MF	SWE	Erik Johansson
8	FW	SWE	Karl Svensson
9	FW	SWE	Benny Lieberth
10	MF	SWE	Christoffer Nerell
11	MF	SWE	Göran Ljungberg
12	MF	SWE	Christian Nygren
14	MF	SWE	Otto Sahlén

No.	Pos.	Nation	Player
15	DF	SWE	Mattias Alfredsson
19	MF	SWE	Andrew Scott Lock
21	DF	SWE	Christian Boman
22	FW	SWE	Axel Emanuelsson
23	FW	SWE	Christoffer Gustavsson
24	MF	SWE	Fredrik Hurtig
26	MF	SWE	Edward Adolfsson
27	GK	SWE	Erik Nilsson
29	DF	SWE	Oscar Thörnbring
30	GK	SWE	Andreas Gren
31	DF	SWE	Magnus Mörk
33	DF	SWE	Martin Lindahl
34	MF	SWE	Oskar Sjöstrand

== Coaching staff ==
Role	Name	Nation
Manager	Michel Berntsson Gonzalez	Sweden
Manager	Johan Dahlström	Sweden
Assistant coach	Collin Scott	England
Fitness Coach	Anders Carlsson	Sweden
Goalkeeping coach	Fredrik Sund	Sweden
