= Luleå SK =

Swedish football club

- Full name: Luleå Sportklubb
- Founded: 1915
- Ground: Hertsö IP; Luleå; Sweden
- Chairman: Bengt Augustsson
- Head coach: Danne Sandberg
- League: Division 3 Norra Norrland
- 2025: Division 4 Norra Norrland,1st
Home colours

Luleå SK is a Swedish football club located in Luleå.

== Background ==
Luleå Sportklubb was founded on 22 October 1915 at Lundgrens café in Storgatan.

Since their foundation Luleå SK has participated mainly in the middle divisions of the Swedish football league system. The club currently plays in Division 3 Norra Norrland which is the fifth tier of Swedish football. They play their home matches at the Hertsö IP in Luleå.

For many decades, right up to the first years of the 21st century, the club also had an active bandy department.

Luleå SK are affiliated to the Norrbottens Fotbollförbund. The club won the Midnattsolscupen (Midnight Sun Cup) in 2009.

== Season to season ==
Season	Level	Division	Section	Position	Movements
1993	Tier 4	Division 3	Norra Norrland	3rd	
1994	Tier 4	Division 3	Norra Norrland	5th	
1995	Tier 4	Division 3	Norra Norrland	3rd	
1996	Tier 4	Division 3	Norra Norrland	8th	
1997	Tier 4	Division 3	Norra Norrland	5th	
1998	Tier 4	Division 3	Norra Norrland	4th	
1999	Tier 4	Division 3	Norra Norrland	10th	Relegated
2000	Tier 5	Division 4	Norrbotten Norra	3rd	
2001	Tier 5	Division 4	Norrbotten Norra	2nd	Promotion Playoffs
2002	Tier 5	Division 4	Norrbotten Norra	1st	Promoted
2003	Tier 4	Division 3	Norra Norrland	1st	Promoted
2004	Tier 3	Division 2	Norrland	12th	Relegated
2005	Tier 4	Division 3	Norra Norrland	7th	
2006*	Tier 5	Division 3	Norra Norrland	11th	Relegated
2007	Tier 6	Division 4	Norrbotten Norra	5th	
2008	Tier 6	Division 4	Norrbotten Norra	2nd	Promotion Playoffs
2009	Tier 6	Division 4	Norrbotten Norra	1st	Promoted
2010	Tier 5	Division 3	Norra Norrland	5th	
2011	Tier 5	Division 3	Norra Norrland	5th	
2012	Tier 5	Division 3	Norra Norrland	10th	Relegated
2013	Tier 6	Division 4	Norrbotten Norra	6th	
2014	Tier 6	Division 4	Norrbotten Norra	9th	
2015	Tier 6	Division 4	Norrbotten Norra	2nd	
2016	Tier 6	Division 4	Norrbotten Norra	1st	Not Promoted
2017	Tier 6	Division 4	Norrbotten Norra	4th	
2018	Tier 6	Division 4	Norrbotten Södra	1st	Promoted
2019	Tier 5	Division 3	Norra Norrland	7th	
2020	Tier 5	Division 3	Norra Norrland	3rd	
2021	Tier 5	Division 3	Norra Norrland	3rd	
2022	Tier 5	Division 3	Norra Norrland	10th	Relegated
2023	Tier 6	Division 4	Norrbotten Södra	3rd	Promoted
2024	Tier 5	Division 3	Norra Norrland	10th	Relegated
2025	Tier 6	Division 4	Norrbotten Södra	1st	Promoted
2026	Tier 5	Division 3	Norra Norrland		

* League restructuring in 2006 resulted in a new division being created at Tier 3 and subsequent divisions dropping a level.

== Attendances ==
In recent seasons Luleå SK have had the following average attendances:

Season	Average attendance	Division / Section	Level
2003	181	Div 3 Norra Norrland	Tier 4
2004	229	Div 2 Norrland	Tier 3
2005	102	Div 3 Norra Norrland	Tier 4
2006	105	Div 3 Norra Norrland	Tier 5
2007	N/A	Div 4 Norrbotten Norra	Tier 6
2008	N/A	Div 4 Norrbotten Norra	Tier 6
2009	N/A	Div 4 Norrbotten Norra	Tier 6
2010	167	Div 3 Norra Norrland	Tier 5
2011	140	Div 3 Norra Norrland	Tier 5
2012	88	Div 3 Norra Norrland	Tier 5
2013	68	Div 4 Norrbotten Norra	Tier 6
2014	78	Div 4 Norrbotten Norra	Tier 6
2015	59	Div 4 Norrbotten Norra	Tier 6
2016	124	Div 4 Norrbotten Norra	Tier 6
2017	94	Div 4 Norrbotten Norra	Tier 6
2018	78	Div 4 Norrbotten Södra	Tier 6
2019	?	Div 3 Norra Norrland	Tier 5
2020		Div 3 Norra Norrland	Tier 5

* Attendances are provided in the Publikliga sections of the Svenska Fotbollförbundet website.

== Achievements ==
- Midnattsolscupen:
  - Winners (1): 2009
