= Växjö BK =

Swedish football club

- Full name: Växjö Bollklubb
- Nickname: Tigrarna
- Founded: 1924
- Ground: Sportfältet, Teleborg, Växjö
- Chairman: Christer Albinsson
- Coach: Andreas Öhman; Andreas Karlsson
- League: Division 4
- Division 4, Småland Sydvästra,
Home colours

Växjö BK is a Swedish football club located in Växjö in Kronoberg County.

== Background ==
Växjö Bollklubb was formed on 20 January 1924 at a meeting at the Roséns café. Fotbollsföreningen Tigrarna had the previous year applied to join the Swedish Football Association but had been turned down because there was already a team from Stockholm with the same name. Therefore, it was decided that the club would be called Växjö BK. The club currently has around 1,700 members including an active youth section.

Since their foundation Växjö BK has participated mainly in the middle divisions of the Swedish football league system. The club reached its peak way back in 1936-37 when they played one season in Division 2 Södra, which at that time was the second tier of Swedish football. They play their home matches at the Sportfältet in Växjö.

Växjö BK are affiliated to Smålands Fotbollförbund.

== Recent history ==
In recent seasons Växjö BK have competed in the following divisions:

2020 - Division IV, Småland Sydvästra
2019 - Division IV, Småland Sydvästra
2018 - Division IV, Småland Södra
2017 - Division IV, Småland Södra
2016 - Division IV, Småland Sydvästra
2015 - Division IV, Småland Elit Östra
2014 - Division III, Sydöstra Götaland
2013 - Division III, Sydöstra Götaland
2012 - Division IV, Småland Elit Östra
2011 - Division III, Sydöstra Götaland
2010 - Division III, Sydöstra Götaland
2009 - Division III, Sydöstra Götaland
2008 - Division IV, Småland Elit Västra
2007 - Division IV, Småland Elit Östra
2007 - Division IV, Småland Elit Södra
2006 - Division IV, Småland Elit Södra
2005 - Division III, Sydöstra Götaland
2004 - Division II, Östra Götaland
2003 - Division II, Östra Götaland
2002 - Division III, Sydöstra Götaland
2001 - Division III, Sydöstra Götaland
2000 - Division III, Sydöstra Götaland
1999 - Division III, Sydöstra Götaland
1998 - Division III, Sydöstra Götaland
1997 - Division III, Sydvästra Götaland
1996 - Division III, Sydöstra Götaland
1995 - Division III, Sydöstra Götaland
1994 - Division II, Östra Götaland
1993 - Division II, Östra Götaland

== Attendances ==
In recent seasons Växjö BK have had the following average attendances:

Season	Average attendance	Division / Section	Level
2008	Not available	Div 4 Småland Elit Västra	Tier 6
2009	222	Div 3 Sydöstra Götaland	Tier 5
2010	213	Div 3 Sydöstra Götaland	Tier 5
2011	108	Div 3 Sydöstra Götaland	Tier 5
2012	82	Div 4 Småland Elit Östra	Tier 6
2013	169	Div 3 Sydöstra Götaland	Tier 5
2014	106	Div 3 Sydöstra Götaland	Tier 5
2015	83	Div 4 Småland Elit Östra	Tier 6
2016	Not available	Div 4 Småland Sydvästra	Tier 6
2017	Not available	Div 4 Småland Södra	Tier 6
2018	Not available	Div 4 Småland Södra	Tier 6
2019		Div 4 Småland Sydvästra	Tier 6
2020		Div 4 Småland Sydvästra	Tier 6

* Attendances are provided in the Publikliga sections of the Svenska Fotbollförbundet website.

The attendance record is 3,648 for a match against Öster at Värendsvallen which Växjö BK won 2–1.
