= Ängby IF =

Swedish football club

- Full name: Ängby Idrottsförening
- Founded: 1932
- Ground: Ängby IP; Stockholm, Sweden
- Capacity: 1,000
- Chairman: Oscar Borg
- Coach: Zlatko Tesic
- League: Division 4 Stockholm Mellersta
Home colours	Away colours

Ängby IF is a Swedish football club located in Ängby, a western suburb of Stockholm.

== Background ==
Ängby Idrottsförening was formed on Friday 5 May 1932. In 1947 Ängby IP was opened with more than 2,000 people in attendance at the sports ground and about 500 participants taking part in athletic competitions, folk dance, handball, gymnastics display and finally a football match between Ängby and Bromsten II. The club has been active in a variety of sports over the years including football, bandy, ice-hockey and athletics.

Since their foundation Ängby IF has participated mainly in the middle divisions of the Swedish football league system. In 2016 the club won the Division 4 Stockholm Mellersta League which is the sixth tier of Swedish football and in 2017 will play in division 3. The club play their home matches at Ängby IP in Stockholm.

Ängby IF are affiliated to Stockholms Fotbollförbund.

Ängby Idrottsplats has been the club's home ground since 1947. The club offers a wide range of activities for children and young people and has about 60 teams in league games in football and almost 30 teams in league games in floorball. The club's representative team in football, men, plays in division 4 (2021)

== Recent history ==
In recent seasons Ängby IF have competed in the following divisions:

2021 - Division IV, Stockholm Mellersta

2020 - Division III, Södra Svealand

2019 - Division III, Södra Svealand

2018 - Division III, Södra Svealand

2016 – Division IV, Stockholm Mellersta, League Position: 1

2015 – Division IV, Stockholm Mellersta, League Position: 4

2014 – Division IV, Stockholm Mellersta, League Position: 2

2013 – Division IV, Stockholm Mellersta, League Position: 3

2012 – Division III, Norra Svealand, League Position: 9

2011 – Division III, Norra Svealand

2010 – Division IV, Stockholm Mellersta

2009 – Division IV, Stockholm Norra

2008 – Division III, Norra Svealand

2007 – Division III, Norra Svealand

2006 – Division III, Norra Svealand

2005 – Division IV, Stockholm Norra

2004 – Division IV, Stockholm Norra

2003 – Division III, Norra Svealand

2002 – Division III, Östra Svealand

2001 – Division III, Östra Svealand

2000 – Division IV, Stockholm Norra

1999 – Division III, Norra Svealand

1998 – Division IV, Stockholm Norra

1997 – Division IV, Stockholm Norra

== Attendances ==
In recent seasons Ängby IF have had the following average attendances:

Season	Average attendance	Division / Section	Level
2005	Not available	Div 4 Stockholm Norra	Tier 5
2006	62	Div 3 Norra Svealand	Tier 5
2007	70	Div 3 Norra Svealand	Tier 5
2008	50	Div 3 Norra Svealand	Tier 5
2009	Not available	Div 4 Stockholm Norra	Tier 6
2010		Div 4 Stockholm Mellersta	Tier 6

* Attendances are provided in the Publikliga sections of the Svenska Fotbollförbundet website.
