= Västerviks FF =

Swedish football club

- Full name: Västerviks Fotbollförening
- Short name: VFF
- Founded: 7 January 1988; 38 years ago
- Ground: Bökensved IP
- Coach: Jimmy Svensson
- League: Division 3
- 2020: Division 3, 4th of 11
Home colours	Away colours

Västerviks Fotbollförening, commonly called Västerviks FF or VFF, is a Swedish association football club based in Västervik, Småland, Sweden. The team competes in Division 3, the fifth tier of the Swedish football league system. The club was founded in 1988, when Västerviks AIS and Jenny BK decided to merge.

== History ==
=== 1988: Jenny BK and VAIS merge ===
It was on Thursday, January 7, 1988, that Jenny BK and VAIS wrote sports history in Västervik. Both clubs were gathered for the annual meeting in their respective premises in Folkets Hus, and it was that evening that Västerviks FF (VFF) was formed.

Jenny BK decided to close with 138 yes votes and two abstentions. At VAIS, it was a tougher tag. 98 members said yes to the closure, 33 said no, four ballots were blank and two were invalid. After the clubs' annual meetings, there was a joint gathering in the Theater Salon, where Västerviks FF was formed. The association's first chairman was Christer Svedebäck. The Board also had this composition: Per Larsson, Vice Chairman, Björn Adolfsson, Secretary, Lennart Pettersson, Treasurer, Arne Johansson, Sture Johansson, Sven-Åke Lindblad, Jan Svensson, Kjell Söderqvist and Ove Thörnlöf.

Chairman of the women's section: Benny Pettersson, men's section: Tomas Östin, youth section: Hans Svensson, finance section: Lennart Pettersson, marketing section: Sven-Åke Lindblad.

VFF's first budget ended at SEK 1.5 million. The club expected to have 35 teams in training and games during the premiere year. Sten-Bertil Myhrén became VFF's first senior coach, Benno Magnusson second coach and Tord Eriksson's team manager. The women's team was led by Marie Bengtsson, Nils Ragnarsson and Classe Jacobsson. The club suit turned all yellow.

=== Merited new acquisitions and major investment: 1988–90 ===
The first year as a new club, they faced Luton Town in a training match at Bökensved. Luton, who at this time played in the English top flight and were the reigning League Cup champions in the country (3–2 win in the final over Arsenal at Wembley) won by just 2–1 against VFF in front of 587 spectators.

When VFF was formed, the goal was crystal clear for most people. The club would become an established Division II team, now Division 1, within the next few years and have a broad and active youth activity. The association made several spectacular signings to succeed in its goal. First out was Lennart Weidenstolpe who came from IFK Norrköping in 1989 and he was a playing coach for several years. Before 1990, the shooting king recruited Leif Eriksson and the Icelander Torir Olafsson. During the autumn season, ex-professional Janne Svensson strengthened the team to manage a new contract. Before 1991, the Russian Sergej Prigoda was recruited from Östers IF in Allsvenskan. On two occasions, VFF was close to reaching the goal of Div. II.

== Players ==
=== Current squad ===
As of 29 August 2021

Note: Flags indicate national team as defined under FIFA eligibility rules; some limited exceptions apply. Players may hold more than one non-FIFA nationality.

No.	Pos.	Nation	Player
1	GK	SWE	Elias Swärd
2	DF	SWE	Tobias Palm
4	MF	SWE	Simon Larsson
5	DF	SWE	Fredrik Lindhe
6	DF	SWE	Johan Lundin (vice-captain)
7	MF	SWE	Amel Komina
8	MF	SWE	Calle Sjögren
9	MF	SWE	Alfred Grahn
10	MF	SWE	Daniel Engel
11	FW	SWE	Tim Håvestam
12	FW	SWE	Christopher Sjöblad
14	DF	SWE	Tobias Bertilsson
14	MF	SWE	Magnus Eriksson
16	DF	SWE	Jonathan Fält Öhr (captain)

No.	Pos.	Nation	Player
17	DF	SWE	Mehmet Tekbas
19	DF	SWE	Josef Fenikh
19	FW	SWE	Melvin Svensson
25	FW	SWE	Hjalmar Grahn
94	GK	SWE	Albin Liffner
-	FW	SWE	Anton Westerberg

== Non-playing staff ==
=== Corporate hierarchy ===
Position	Name
Chairman	(Sweden) Petter Grönwall
Secretary	(Sweden) Charlotta Fridell
Cashier	(Sweden) Carl-Johan Nirbrant
Register extract	(Sweden) Ulrika Gustafsson
SportAdmin, Fogis, Website	(Sweden) Daniel Karlsson
Market, Sales	(Sweden) Mattias Nordqvist
Real estate	(Sweden) Magnus Johansson (Sweden) Björn Karlsson

== Stadium ==
Västerviks FF play their home matches at Bökensved, where city competitor and rival IFK Västervik also play their home matches. However, the club trains and conducts its activities at Karstorp, which is located in the southern part of the city, where the association's clubhouse, Karstorps Gård, also is located. At Bökensved there are three football pitches, one of which with artificial turf and lighting.

== Women's team ==
Västerviks Damfotboll is a collaboration between Västerviks FF and IFK Västervik with the goal of strengthening women's football in Västervik. In the 2021 season, the A team played in Division 3 while the B team was in Division 4. The management staff consists of Tobias Ring, Mikael Gunnarsson and Fredrik Walfridsson. In October 2021, the A team qualified up to Division 2 after winning the series on goal difference.

== More ==
The club is affiliated to Smålands Fotbollförbund.
