= Gullringen =

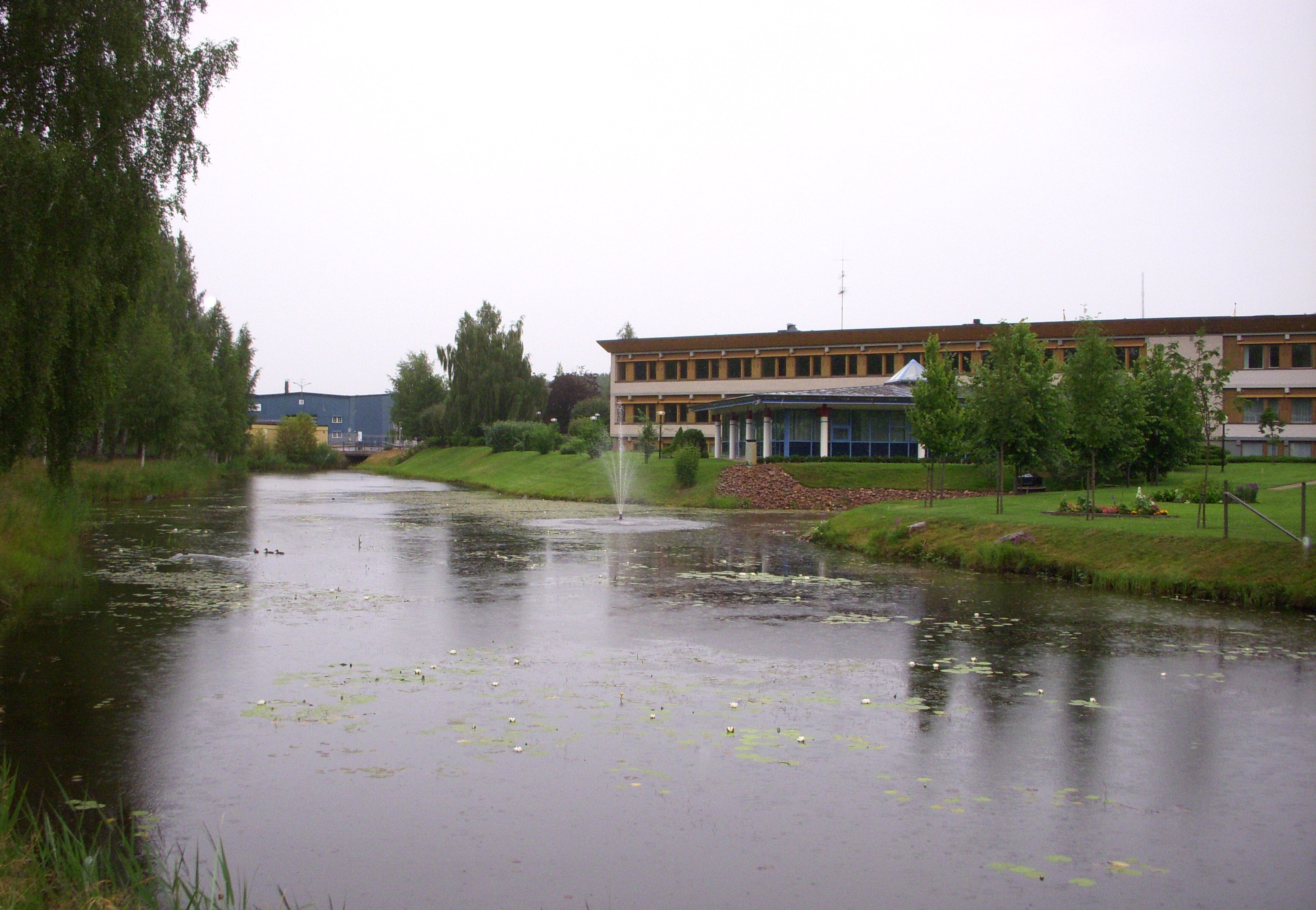

- Location within Kalmar Location within Sweden
- Coordinates: 57°48′N 15°42′E
- Country: Sweden
- Province: Småland
- County: Kalmar County
- Municipality: Vimmerby Municipality

Area
  - Total: 1.44 km^{2} (0.56 sq mi)

Population (31 December 2010)
  - Total: 541
  - Density: 375/km^{2} (970/sq mi)
- Time zone: UTC+1 (CET)
  - Summer (DST): UTC+2 (CEST)

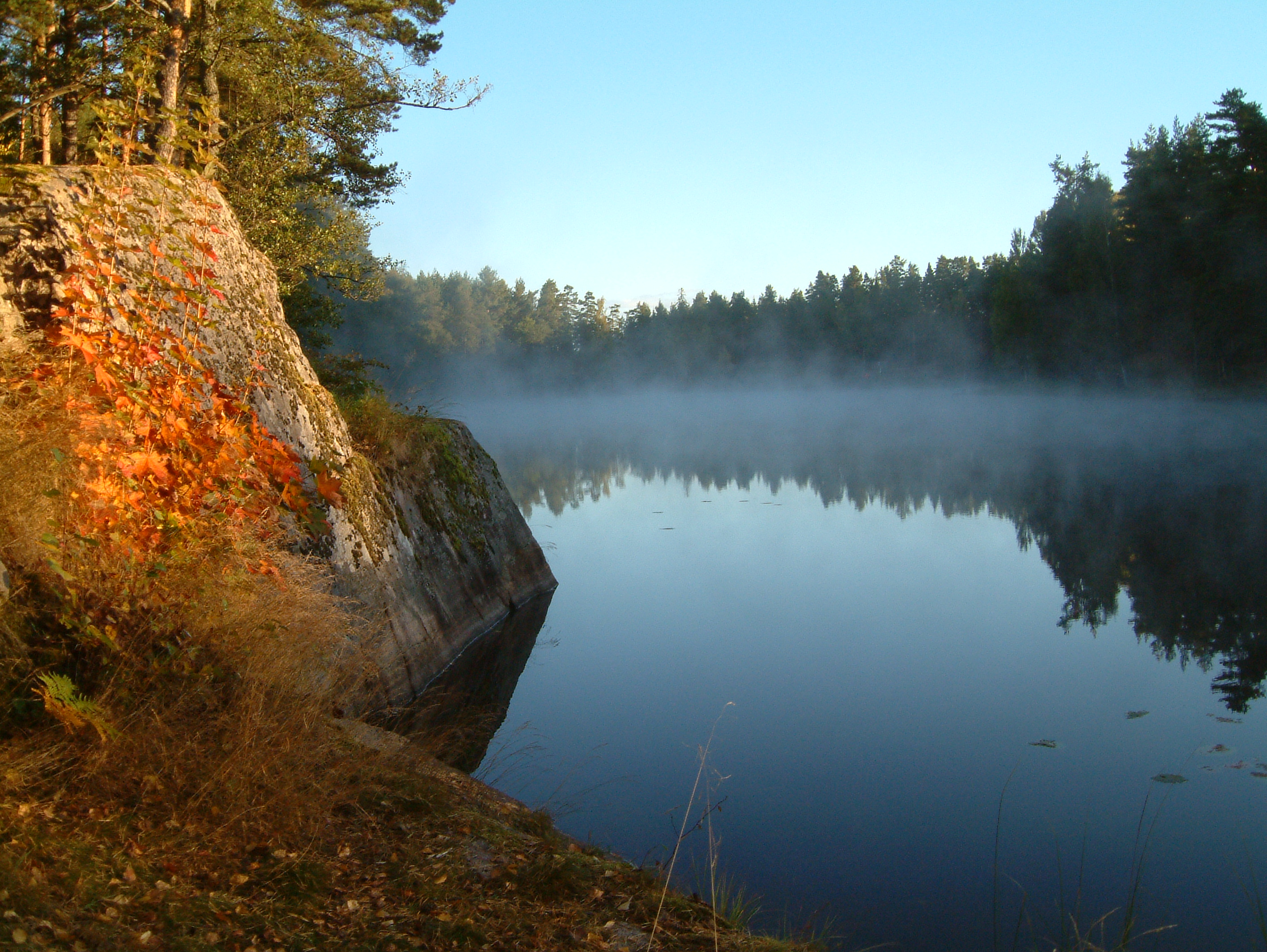
The pond

Gullringen is a locality situated in Vimmerby Municipality, Kalmar County, Sweden with 541 inhabitants in 2010.

Gullringen is best known for its football team, Gullringens GoIF, and the house maker, Gullringshus.
