= Infjärdens SK =

Swedish football club

- Full name: Infjärdens Sportklubb
- Founded: 1990
- Ground: Näsåkra IP
- Chairman: Robert Bergman
- Coach: Pär Sundström
- League: Division 3 Norra Norrland
Home colours

Infjärdens SK is a Swedish football team from Roknäs in Piteå Municipality, Norrbotten that is currently playing in Division 3 Norra Norrland.

== Background ==
Infjärdens SK (abbreviated ISK) originates from three clubs:

- Långnäs IF (formed 1931) specialising in football, bandy, skiing, athletics and hockey.
- Rokna IF (formed 1932) specialising in football, skiing, hockey and table tennis.
- Sjulnäs IF (formed 1943) specialising in football.

In 1949 Sjulnäs IF merged with Rokna IF to become Rokna-Sjulnäs SK (RSSK). The main activities of the club were football and hockey. In 1966 RSSK merged with Långnäs IF (LIF) to form Rokna-Långnäs SK (RLSK).

Many questions were asked in later years why Sjulnäs was not in the club's title particularly as Sjulnäs is the main town in the club's catchment area. It was decided then to adopt the club name Infjärdens SK (ISK) and this was finally confirmed at a launching ceremony at the Sjulnäs sports hall on 29 January 1990.

ISK today has a large catchment area for the club's activities catering for extensive youth activities and successful senior citizen activities. The club continues to evolve and welcomes new members to join ISK.

Infjärdens SK are affiliated to Norrbottens Fotbollförbund.

== Season to season ==
Season	Level	Division	Section	Position	Movements
1999	Tier 5	Division 4	Norrbotten Södra	7th	
2000	Tier 5	Division 4	Norrbotten Södra	2nd	
2001	Tier 5	Division 4	Norrbotten Södra	1st	Promoted
2002	Tier 4	Division 3	Norra Norrland	7th	
2003	Tier 4	Division 3	Norra Norrland	2nd	
2004	Tier 4	Division 3	Norra Norrland	3rd	
2005	Tier 4	Division 3	Norra Norrland	2nd	Promoted
2006*	Tier 4	Division 2	Norrland	9th	
2007	Tier 4	Division 2	Norrland	9th	
2008	Tier 4	Division 2	Norrland	9th	
2009	Tier 4	Division 2	Norrland	12th	Relegated
2010	Tier 5	Division 3	Norra Norrland	11th	Relegated
2011	Tier 5	Division 4	Norrbotten Södra	1st	Promoted

* League restructuring in 2006 resulted in a new division being created at Tier 3 and subsequent divisions dropping a level.
