= Sävast AIF =

Swedish football club

- Full name: Sävast Allmänna Idrottsförening
- Founded: 1977
- Ground: Boden Arena; Boden; Sweden
- Chairman: Fredrik Bandh
- Head coach: Rikard Eriksson
- Coach: Oskar Sandberg; Mats Selberg
- League: Division 3 Norra Norrland
- 2009: Division 3 Norra Norrland, 4th
Home colours	Away colours

Sävast AIF is a Swedish football club located in Sävast which is a neighbourhood of Boden, Norrbotten County.

== Background ==
Sävast AIF was formed in 1977 with five sections covering Skiing, Tennis, Basketball, Football and Orienteering. In 1996 the separate sports split away from the club, partly because it was difficult to form a main board. Everyone wanted to work with their own sport leaving football to maintain the identity of Sävast AIF.

Sävast AIF has at most run 17 teams catering for approximately 400 young people. Today Sävast AIF caters for approximately 230 young people in training with girls and boys teams in addition to the senior team.

Since their foundation Sävast AIF has participated mainly in the middle and lower divisions of the Swedish football league system. The club currently plays in Division 3 Norra Norrland which is the fifth tier of Swedish football. They play their home matches at the Boden Arena in Boden.

Sävast AIF are affiliated to the Norrbottens Fotbollförbund.

== Season to season ==
Season	Level	Division	Section	Position	Movements
1998	Tier 5	Division 4	Norrbotten Södra	4th	
1999	Tier 5	Division 4	Norrbotten Södra	9th	Relegated
2000	Tier 6	Division 5	Norrbotten Mellersta	1st	Promoted
2001	Tier 5	Division 4	Norrbotten Södra	6th	
2002	Tier 5	Division 4	Norrbotten Södra	1st	Promoted
2003	Tier 4	Division 3	Norra Norrland	7th	
2004	Tier 4	Division 3	Norra Norrland	7th	
2005	Tier 4	Division 3	Norra Norrland	3rd	Promoted
2006*	Tier 4	Division 2	Norrland	11th	Relegated
2007	Tier 5	Division 3	Norra Norrland	5th	
2008	Tier 5	Division 3	Norra Norrland	3rd	
2009	Tier 5	Division 3	Norra Norrland	4th	
2010	Tier 5	Division 3	Norra Norrland	9th	Relegation Playoffs – Relegated

* League restructuring in 2006 resulted in a new division being created at Tier 3 and subsequent divisions dropping a level.

== Attendances ==
In recent seasons Sävast AIF have had the following average attendances:

Season	Average attendance	Division / Section	Level
2005	140	Div 3 Norra Norrland	Tier 4
2006	146	Div 2 Norrland	Tier 4
2007	139	Div 3 Norra Norrland	Tier 5
2008	172	Div 3 Norra Norrland	Tier 5
2009	172	Div 3 Norra Norrland	Tier 5
2010	78	Div 3 Norra Norrland	Tier 5

* Attendances are provided in the Publikliga sections of the Svenska Fotbollförbundet website.
