= LSW IF =

Swedish football club

- Full name: Lemunda Starka Wiljor Idrottsförening
- Ground: Norra IP; Motala; Sweden
- Chairman: Kenneth Håkansson
- Coach: Fredrik Blomberg
- League: Division 4västra östergötland
- 2010: Division 3 Nordöstra Götaland, 9th
Home colours	Away colours

LSW IF is a Swedish football club located in Motala in Östergötland County.

== Background ==
The full name of the club is Lemunda Starka Wiljor Idrottsförening but the organisation is now known in its abbreviated form as LSW IF. The club runs men's and ladies sides and is supported by an active youth section.

Since their foundation LSW IF has participated mainly in the middle and lower divisions of the Swedish football league system. The club currently plays in Division 4 Västra Götaland which is the sixth tier of Swedish football. They play their home matches at the Norra IP in Motala.

LSW IF are affiliated to Östergötlands Fotbollförbund.

The young players are playing at mossen

== Recent history ==
In recent seasons LSW IF have competed in the following divisions:

2024-Division IIII, Västra Götaland

2023-Division IIII, Västra Götaland

2022-Division IIII, Västra Götaland

2011 – Division III, Nordöstra Götaland
2010 – Division III, Nordöstra Götaland
2009 – Division III, Nordöstra Götaland
2008 – Division III, Nordöstra Götaland
2007 – Division IV, Östergötland Västra
2006 – Division IV, Östergötland Västra
2005 – Division IV, Östergötland Västra
2004 – Division III, Nordöstra Götaland
2003 – Division III, Nordöstra Götaland
2002 – Division III, Nordöstra Götaland
2001 – Division III, Nordöstra Götaland
2000 – Division III, Nordöstra Götaland
1999 – Division III, Nordöstra Götaland

== Attendances ==
In recent seasons LSW IF have had the following average attendances:

Season	Average attendance	Division / Section	Level
2007	Not available	Div 4 Östergötland Västra	Tier 6
2008	67	Div 3 Nordöstra Götaland	Tier 5
2009	67	Div 3 Nordöstra Götaland	Tier 5
2010	45	Div 3 Nordöstra Götaland	Tier 5

* Attendances are provided in the Publikliga sections of the Svenska Fotbollförbundet website.
