= Polcirkeln/Svanstein FF =

Swedish football club

- Full name: Polcirkeln/Svanstein Fotbollförening
- Founded: 1993
- Ground: Svansteins IP; Juoksengi; Sweden
- Chairman: Roger Mäki
- League: Division 4 Norrbotten Norra
Home colours

Polcirkeln/Svanstein FF is a Swedish football club located in Juoksengi.

== Background ==
Polcirkeln/Svanstein FF (abbreviated Pol/Svanstein FF) was formed in 1993 following the merger of Svansteins SK and IF Polcirkeln. Up to 2001 the club was known as IF Polcirkeln/Svanstein. Polcirkeln/Svanstein FF currently plays in Division 4 Norrbotten Norra which is the sixth tier of Swedish football. They play their home matches at the Svansteins IP in Juoksengi.

The club is affiliated to Norrbottens Fotbollförbund. Polcirkeln/Svanstein FF won the Midnattsolscupen (Midnight Sun Cup) in 2003.

== Season to season ==
Season	Level	Division	Section	Position	Movements
1997	Tier 5	Division 4	Norrbotten Norra	2nd	Promotion Playoffs
1998	Tier 5	Division 4	Norrbotten Norra	5th	
1999	Tier 5	Division 4	Norrbotten Norra	1st	Promotion Playoffs
2000	Tier 5	Division 4	Norrbotten Norra	1st	Promoted
2001	Tier 4	Division 3	Norra Norrland	3rd	
2002	Tier 4	Division 3	Norra Norrland	3rd	
2003	Tier 4	Division 3	Norra Norrland	8th	
2004	Tier 4	Division 3	Norra Norrland	5th	
2005	Tier 4	Division 3	Norra Norrland	11th	Relegated
2006*	Tier 6	Division 4	Norrbotten Norra	1st	Promoted
2007	Tier 5	Division 3	Norra Norrland	11th	Relegated
2008	Tier 6	Division 4	Norrbotten Norra	6th	
2009	Tier 6	Division 4	Norrbotten Norra	9th	
2010	Tier 6	Division 4	Norrbotten Norra	7th	
2011	Tier 6	Division 4	Norrbotten Norra	8th	

* League restructuring in 2006 resulted in a new division being created at Tier 3 and subsequent divisions dropping a level.
