= KF Velebit =

Swedish football club

- Full name: Kroatiska Föreningen Velebit
- Founded: 1962
- Ground: Velebit IP; Gothenburg; Sweden
- Chairman: Tomislav Mikulic
- Head coach: Ivo Skiljo
- Coach: Ante Skiljo
- League: Division 3 Nordvästra Götaland
- 2010: Division 4 Göteborg B, 1st (Promoted)
Home colours

KF Velebit is a Swedish football club located in Gothenburg.

== Background ==
Kroatiska Föreningen Velebit were founded in 1962, but were not formally registered until 15 January 1964 when the football section of the club started. Velebit is the name of the largest mountain range in Croatia and this title was chosen to symbolise stability, grandeur and strength. During their first season membership comprised mostly young men in their 20s, who came to Sweden as the first wave of labour migrants from Croatia. The focus of the club has changed as time has progressed and new sections and activities have been added with the common thread of preserving of Croatian culture and language. A key addition was made in 1986 with the completion of a clubhouse.

The club has approximately 1,100 members and 20 sections. The membership of KF Velebit includes various ages, genders, and nationalities, such as Swedes and Croats.

Since their foundation KF Velebit has participated mainly in the middle and lower divisions of the Swedish football league system. The club currently plays in Division 3 Nordvästra Götaland which is the fifth tier of Swedish football. They play their home matches at the Velebit IP in Göteborg.

KF Velebit are affiliated to Göteborgs Fotbollförbund.

== Recent history ==
In recent seasons KF Velebit have competed in the following divisions:

2011 – Division III, Nordvästra Götaland
2010 – Division IV, Göteborg B
2009 – Division IV, Göteborg B
2008 – Division IV, Göteborg B
2007 – Division IV, Göteborg B
2006 – Division III, Nordvästra Götaland
2005 – Division III, Nordvästra Götaland
2004 – Division III, Nordvästra Götaland
2003 – Division III, Nordvästra Götaland
2002 – Division III, Nordvästra Götaland
2001 – Division IV, Göteborg B
2000 – Division IV, Göteborg B
1999 – Division IV, Göteborg B

== Attendances ==
In recent seasons KF Velebit have had the following average attendances:

Season	Average attendance	Division / Section	Level
2001	Not available	Div 4 Göteborg B	Tier 5
2002	200	Div 3 Nordvästra Götaland	Tier 4
2003	206	Div 3 Nordvästra Götaland	Tier 4
2004	251	Div 3 Nordvästra Götaland	Tier 4
2005	218	Div 3 Nordvästra Götaland	Tier 4
2006	167	Div 3 Nordvästra Götaland	Tier 5
2007	Not available	Div 4 Göteborg B	Tier 6
2008	Not available	Div 4 Göteborg B	Tier 6
2009	Not available	Div 4 Göteborg B	Tier 6
2010	53	Div 4 Göteborg B	Tier 6

* Attendances are provided in the Publikliga sections of the Svenska Fotbollförbundet website and European Football Statistics website.
