= IF VP Uppsala =

Swedish football club

- Full name: Idrottsföreningen Vindhemspojkarna Uppsala
- Nickname: IF VP
- Founded: 7 January 1963
- Ground: Ekebydalen; Uppsala; Sweden
- Coach: Ronald Freiman
- League: Division 5 Uppland Västra
- 2010: Division 5 Uppland Västra, 7th
Home colours

IF VP Uppsala, earlier called IF Vindhemspojkarna, is a Swedish football club located in Uppsala.

== Background ==
The club started as a bandy club but branched out into many other sports. However, now all departments but the football has been terminated.

Since their foundation IF Vindhemspojkarna has participated mainly in the middle and lower divisions of the Swedish football league system. IF VP played in the Swedish second division in 2000 and 2001. The club currently plays in Division 5 Uppland Västra which is the seventh tier of Swedish football. They play their home matches at the Ekebydalen in Uppsala.

IF Vindhemspojkarna are affiliated to the Upplands Fotbollförbund. Their home colours are orange shirts, blue shorts with blue socks.

During the 2003–2004 season, the men's bandy team qualified for the upcoming season edition of Allsvenskan. However, in August 2004 the club had to withdraw before the premiere following lack of players. The club was replaced in Allsvenskan with Västanfors IF from Fagersta. Following disappointment, it was announced in August 2004 that the club's bandy representation team would be dissolved. The youth bandy activity was merged with Danmarks IF as "VP/Danmark", before ending up dissolved.

== Season to season ==
| Season | Level | Division | Section | Position | Movements |
|---|---|---|---|---|---|
| 1996 | Tier 5 | Division 4 | Uppland | 4th | |
| 1997 | Tier 5 | Division 4 | Uppland | 1st | Promoted |
| 1998 | Tier 4 | Division 3 | Norra Svealand | 6th | |
| 1999 | Tier 4 | Division 3 | Norra Svealand | 1st | Promoted |
| 2000 | Tier 3 | Division 2 | Östra Svealand | 6th | |
| 2001 | Tier 3 | Division 2 | Östra Svealand | 11th | Relegated |
| 2002 | Tier 4 | Division 3 | Norra Svealand | 8th | |
| 2003 | Tier 4 | Division 3 | Norra Svealand | 5th | |
| 2004 | Tier 4 | Division 3 | Norra Svealand | 11th | Relegated |
| 2005 | Tier 5 | Division 4 | Uppland | 9th | |
| 2006* | Tier 6 | Division 4 | Uppland | 4th | |
| 2007 | Tier 6 | Division 4 | Uppland | 4th | |
| 2008 | Tier 6 | Division 4 | Uppland | 12th | Relegated |
| 2009 | Tier 7 | Division 5 | Uppland Norra | 5th | |
| 2010 | Tier 7 | Division 5 | Uppland Västra | 7th | |
| 2011 | Tier 7 | Division 5 | Uppland Östra | 10th | |

* League restructuring in 2006 resulted in a new division being created at Tier 3 and subsequent divisions dropping a level.

== Attendances ==
In recent seasons IF Vindhemspojkarna have had the following average attendances:

| Season | Average attendance | Division / Section | Level |
|---|---|---|---|
| 2009 | Not available | Div 5 Uppland Norra | Tier 7 |
| 2010 | 30 | Div 5 Uppland västra | Tier 7 |

* Attendances are provided in the Publikliga sections of the Svenska Fotbollförbundet website.
