= Eskilstuna Södra FF =

Swedish football club

- Full name: Eskilstuna Södra Fotbollförening
- Founded: 1946
- Ground: Skogsängens IP; Eskilstuna; Sweden
- Chairman: Lars Haglund
- Head coach: Johan Hansson
- Coach: Johan Ludvigsson; Patrik Gustavsson
- League: Division 3 Västra Svealand
- 2012: Division 2 Södra Svealand, 12th (Relegated)
Home colours

Eskilstuna Södra FF is a Swedish football club located in Eskilstuna in Södermanland. The club is currently playing in Division 2, the fourth tier of Swedish football.

== Background ==
Since their foundation, Eskilstuna Södra FF has participated mainly in the middle and lower divisions of the Swedish football league system. The club currently plays in Division 2 which is the fourth tier of Swedish football. Their best season was in 2011 when the club finished first in Division 3 Södra Svealand and promoted to Division 1 with 41 points, only two plus goals better than local rivals IFK Eskilstuna. They play their home matches at the Skogsängens IP in Eskilstuna.

Since 2006 the club have had a cooperation agreement with the top-level Eskilstuna football club, Eskilstuna City FK, which has enabled young City players to be loaned in the middle of season to Eskilstuna Södra FF.

Eskilstuna Södra FF are affiliated to Södermanlands Fotbollförbund. The club's B-team is Eskilstuna Södra TFF.

== Recent history ==
In recent seasons Eskilstuna Södra FF have competed in the following divisions:

2012 – Division II, Södra Svealand
2011 – Division III, Södra Svealand
2010 – Division IV, Södermanland
2009 – Division IV, Södermanland
2008 – Division IV, Södermanland
2007 – Division IV, Södermanland
2006 – Division IV, Södermanland
2005 – Division III, Västra Svealand
2004 – Division III, Östra Svealand
2003 – Division III, Västra Svealand
2002 – Division II, Västra Svealand
2001 – Division II, Västra Svealand
2000 – Division II, Västra Svealand
1999 – Division III, Västra Svealand
1998 – Division IV, Södermanland

== Attendances ==
In recent seasons, Eskilstuna Södra FF have had the following average attendances:

| Season | Average attendance | Division / Section | Level |
|---|---|---|---|
| 2001 | 298 | Div 2 Västra Svealand | Tier 3 |
| 2002 | 265 | Div 2 Västra Svealand | Tier 3 |
| 2003 | 197 | Div 3 Västra Svealand | Tier 4 |
| 2004 | 142 | Div 3 Östra Svealand | Tier 4 |
| 2005 | 178 | Div 3 Västra Svealand | Tier 4 |
| 2006 | Not available | Div 4 Södermanland | Tier 6 |
| 2007 | Not available | Div 4 Södermanland | Tier 6 |
| 2008 | Not available | Div 4 Södermanland | Tier 6 |
| 2009 | 55 | Div 4 Södermanland | Tier 6 |
| 2010 | 86 | Div 4 Södermanland | Tier 6 |
| 2011 | 341 | Div 3 Södra Svealand | Tier 5 |
| 2012 | 107 | Div 2 Södra Svealand | Tier 4 |

* Attendances are provided in the Publikliga sections of the Svenska Fotbollförbundet website and European Football Statistics website.
