= IFK Fjärås =

Swedish football club

- Full name: Idrottsföreningen Kamraterna Fjärås
- Founded: 1932
- Ground: Ögärdets IP; Fjärås; Sweden
- Chairman: Niklas Nedrén
- Head coach: Stefan Larnelius
- Coach: Conny Jannesson, Peter Lövdahl
- League: Division 4 Halland
- 2014: Division 4 Halland Elit, 1st
Home colours	Away colours

IFK Fjärås is a Swedish football club located in Fjärås in Kungsbacka Municipality.

== Background ==
Idrottsföreningen Kamraterna (IFK) Fjärås was formed in 1932 at Westergård by some lads who wanted to start a football club. The oldest archived annual meeting minutes from the end of the 1930s indicate that the club activities included not only football but also walking, hiking and cross-country training for its members.

IFK Fjärås now has over 800 members and is organised into three sections, namely men's, women's and a youth section. The club runs 25–30 teams and has around 350 active players. The main operations are based in Ögärdets IP at the Fjärås Fritidscentrum (Fjärås Leisure Centre). This is where the clubhouse is located along with two grass pitches for 11-a-side teams and a pitch for the seven-a-side teams.

Since their foundation IFK Fjärås has participated mainly in the middle and lower divisions of the Swedish football league system. The club currently plays in Division 3 Sydvästra Götaland which is the fifth tier of Swedish football. Their best season was in 1998 when they finished 11th in Division 2 Västra Götaland, which was then the third tier of Swedish football. The club play their home matches at the Ögärdets IP in Fjärås.

IFK Fjärås are affiliated to Hallands Fotbollförbund. The women's team played in the Swedish top division in 1978 and 1979.

== Recent history ==
In recent seasons IFK Fjärås have competed in the following divisions:

2014 – Division IV Elit, Halland
2013 – Division III, Sydvästra Götaland
2012 – Division III, Sydvästra Götaland
2011 – Division III, Sydvästra Götaland
2010 – Division III, Sydvästra Götaland
2009 – Division III, Sydvästra Götaland
2008 – Division III, Sydvästra Götaland
2007 – Division III, Sydvästra Götaland
2006 – Division IV, Halland
2005 – Division III, Sydvästra Götaland
2004 – Division III, Mellersta Götaland
2003 – Division III, Sydvästra Götaland
2002 – Division III, Nordvästra Götaland
2001 – Division IV, Halland
2000 – Division III, Nordvästra Götaland
1999 – Division III, Nordvästra Götaland
1998 – Division II, Västra Götaland
1997 – Division III, Mellersta Götaland

== Attendances ==
In recent seasons IFK Fjärås have had the following average attendances:

Season	Average attendance	Division / Section	Level
2005	182	Div 3 Sydvästra Götaland	Tier 4
2006	Not available	Div 4 Halland	Tier 6
2007	249	Div 3 Sydvästra Götaland	Tier 5
2008	207	Div 3 Sydvästra Götaland	Tier 5
2009	222	Div 3 Sydvästra Götaland	Tier 5
2010	213	Div 3 Sydvästra Götaland	Tier 5

* Attendances are provided in the Publikliga sections of the Svenska Fotbollförbundet website.

The attendance record of around 1,200 was set on 5 September 1998 against GAIS.
