= Färjestadens GoIF =

Swedish football club

- Full name: Färjestadens Gymnastik-och Idrottsförening
- Ground: Tallhöjdens IP; Färjestaden; Öland; Sweden
- Chairman: Gunilla Johansson
- Head coach: Johan Göransson
- Coach: Anders Svantesson; Mikael Nilsson
- League: Division 3 Sydöstra Götaland
- 2010: Division 3 Sydöstra Götaland, 5th
Home colours	Away colours

Färjestadens GoIF is a Swedish football club located in Färjestaden in Mörbylånga Municipality, Kalmar County. The settlement is located in the southern part on the island of Öland.

== Background ==
Since their foundation Färjestadens GoIF has participated mainly in the middle and lower divisions of the Swedish football league system. The club currently plays in Division 3 Sydöstra Götaland which is the fifth tier of Swedish football. They play their home matches at the Tallhöjdens IP in Färjestaden.

Färjestadens GoIF are affiliated to Smålands Fotbollförbund.

== Recent history ==
In recent seasons Färjestadens GoIF have competed in the following divisions:

2011 – Division III, Sydöstra Götaland
2010 – Division III, Sydöstra Götaland
2009 – Division IV, Småland Elit Östra
2008 – Division IV, Småland Elit Östra
2007 – Division III, Sydöstra Götaland
2006 – Division III, Sydöstra Götaland
2005 – Division III, Sydöstra Götaland
2004 – Division III, Sydöstra Götaland
2003 – Division III, Sydöstra Götaland
2002 – Division III, Sydöstra Götaland
2001 – Division III, Sydöstra Götaland
2000 – Division IV, Småland Sydöstra
1999 – Division III, Sydöstra Götaland
1998 – Division III, Sydöstra Götaland
1997 – Division III, Sydöstra Götaland
1996 – Division II, Östra Götaland
1995 – Division III, Nordöstra Götaland
1994 – Division IV, Småland Sydöstra
1993 – Division IV, Småland Sydöstra

== Attendances ==
In recent seasons Färjestadens GoIF have had the following average attendances:

Season	Average attendance	Division / Section	Level
2005	205	Div 3 Sydöstra Götaland	Tier 4
2006	116	Div 3 Sydöstra Götaland	Tier 5
2007	100	Div 3 Sydöstra Götaland	Tier 5
2008	Not available	Div 4 Småland Elit Östra	Tier 6
2009	Not available	Div 4 Småland Elit Östra	Tier 6
2010	111	Div 3 Sydöstra Götaland	Tier 5

* Attendances are provided in the Publikliga sections of the Svenska Fotbollförbundet website.
