= Betsele IF =

Swedish football club

- Full name: Betsele Idrottsförening
- Founded: 1961
- Ground: Ågläntan; Lycksele; Sweden
- Chairman: Vakant
- League: Division 3
- 2018: Division 4 Västerbotten Norra, 2nd (Promoted)
Home colours	Away colours

Betsele IF is a Swedish football club located in Lycksele in Västerbotten County.

== Background ==
Founded in 1961 Betsele Idrottsförening provides football for women and girls. The club's football ground and clubhouse is located in the village of Ågläntan which is just over a mile from Lycksele.

Since their foundation Betsele IF has participated mainly in the middle and lower divisions of the Swedish football league system. As of 2020 the club plays in Division 3, which is the fifth tier of Swedish football. They play their home matches at the Ågläntan in Lycksele.

Betsele IF are affiliated to Västerbottens Fotbollförbund.

== Recent history ==
In recent seasons Betsele IF have competed in the following divisions:

2010 – Division IV, Västerbotten Norra
2009 – Division IV, Västerbotten Norra
2009 – Division IV, Västerbotten Elit
2008 – Division IV, Västerbotten Norra
2007 – Division IV, Västerbotten Norra
2006 – Division III, Norra Norrland
2005 – Division III, Norra Norrland
2004 – Division III, Mellersta Norrland
2003 – Division III, Norra Norrland
2002 – Division III, Norra Norrland
2001 – Division III, Mellersta Norrland
2000 – Division III, Mellersta Norrland
1999 – Division III, Norra Norrland
1998 – Division III, Norra Norrland
1997 – Division III, Norra Norrland

== Attendances ==
In recent seasons Betsele IF have had the following average attendances:

Season	Average attendance	Division / Section	Level
2005	93	Div 3 Norra Norrland	Tier 4
2006	100	Div 3 Norra Norrland	Tier 5
2007	Not available	Div 4 Västerbotten Norra	Tier 6
2008	Not available	Div 4 Västerbotten Norra	Tier 6
2009	201	Div 4 Västerbotten Norra	Tier 6
2010	108	Div 4 Västerbotten Norra	Tier 6

* Attendances are provided in the Publikliga sections of the Svenska Fotbollförbundet website.
