= 1968 Division 3 (Swedish football) =

Swedish League Division 3
- Season: 1968
- Champions: Gällivare SK; Byske IF (not promoted); IFK Härnösand; Gefle IF; IFK Västerås; Älvsjö AIK; Malungs IF; Södertälje SK; Kinna IF; Blomstermåla IK; Hässleholms IF; Halmstads BK; IK Atleten
- Promoted: 12 teams above
- Relegated: 36 teams

Statistics of Swedish football Division 3 for the 1968 season.

== League standings ==
=== Norra Norrland, Övre 1968 ===
Pos	Team	Pld	W	D	L	GF	GA	GD	Pts	Promotion or relegation
1	Gällivare SK	17	11	3	3	29	12	+17	25	Promotion Playoffs – Promoted
2	Storfors Arbetares IK	18	9	4	5	35	25	+10	22	
3	Kebnekaise IK, Kiruna	18	8	6	4	28	24	+4	22	
4	Norrfjärdens IF	18	10	1	7	35	27	+8	21	
5	Luleå SK	18	7	6	5	28	19	+9	20	
6	Överkalix IF	18	7	3	8	30	25	+5	17	
7	IFK Kalix	17	6	4	7	29	24	+5	16	
8	IFK Råneå	18	5	4	9	20	27	−7	14	
9	Malmbergets AIF	18	4	3	11	17	37	−20	11	Relegated
10	Hornskrokens IF, Boden	18	4	2	12	14	45	−31	10	Relegated

=== Norra Norrland, Nedre 1968 ===
Pos	Team	Pld	W	D	L	GF	GA	GD	Pts	Qualification or relegation
1	Byske IF	18	9	5	4	35	27	+8	23	Promotion Playoffs
2	Lycksele IF	18	8	6	4	28	26	+2	22	
3	Sandviks IK, Holmsund	18	8	5	5	43	24	+19	21	
4	Husums IF	18	9	2	7	37	27	+10	20	
5	Norsjö IF	18	7	5	6	41	27	+14	19	
6	Clemensnäs IF	18	6	6	6	23	19	+4	18	
7	Myckle IK	18	6	6	6	27	32	−5	18	
8	Vebomarks IF	18	6	5	7	25	27	−2	17	
9	Rökå IF	18	5	5	8	28	36	−8	15	Relegated
10	IFK Rundvik	18	2	3	13	21	63	−42	7	Relegated

=== Södra Norrland, Övre 1968 ===
Pos	Team	Pld	W	D	L	GF	GA	GD	Pts	Promotion or relegation
1	IFK Härnösand	18	10	6	2	41	15	+26	26	Promotion Playoffs – Promoted
2	IFK Sundsvall	18	11	4	3	37	13	+24	26	
3	IFK Östersund	18	11	4	3	45	23	+22	26	
4	Kramfors IF	18	11	1	6	37	25	+12	23	
5	Alnö IF	18	10	1	7	42	44	−2	21	
6	Timrå IK	18	8	2	8	30	25	+5	18	
7	Ramviks IK	18	5	6	7	21	31	−10	16	
8	MoDo AIK, Alfredshem	18	3	4	11	21	39	−18	10	
9	Sunds IF, Sundsbruk	18	4	1	13	28	39	−11	9	Relegated
10	Myssjö IF, Kövra	18	2	1	15	22	70	−48	5	Relegated

=== Södra Norrland, Nedre 1968 ===
Pos	Team	Pld	W	D	L	GF	GA	GD	Pts	Promotion or relegation
1	Gefle IF, Gävle	22	17	4	1	74	12	+62	38	Promotion Playoffs – Promoted
2	Sandvikens AIK	22	16	1	5	76	21	+55	33	
3	Kubikenborgs IF, Sundsvall	22	14	1	7	47	38	+9	29	
4	Söderhamns IF	22	12	2	8	34	30	+4	26	
5	Strands IF, Hudiksvall	22	11	2	9	45	44	+1	24	
6	Hudiksvalls ABK	22	8	7	7	33	36	−3	23	
7	Bollnäs GIF	22	9	3	10	32	48	−16	21	
8	Årsunda IF	22	6	7	9	22	28	−6	19	
9	Essviks AIF	22	7	2	13	37	61	−24	16	
10	Skutskärs IF	22	5	5	12	33	50	−17	15	Relegated
11	Svartviks IF	22	3	6	13	23	57	−34	12	Relegated
12	Södra BK, Gävle	22	3	2	17	30	61	−31	8	Relegated

=== Norra Svealand 1968 ===
Pos	Team	Pld	W	D	L	GF	GA	GD	Pts	Promotion or relegation
1	IFK Västerås	22	17	2	3	71	27	+44	36	Promoted
2	BK Forward, Örebro	22	13	4	5	72	47	+25	30	
3	Arboga Södra IF	22	9	7	6	54	38	+16	25	
4	Köpings IS	22	10	5	7	46	38	+8	25	
5	Fagersta AIK	22	9	5	8	39	36	+3	23	
6	Hallstahammars SK	22	9	5	8	40	39	+1	23	
7	IK City, Eskilstuna	22	9	5	8	39	38	+1	23	
8	IFK Kumla	22	9	4	9	24	44	−20	22	
9	Avesta AIK	22	7	4	11	33	38	−5	18	
10	IFK Grängesberg	22	5	4	13	26	48	−22	14	Relegated
11	Frövi IK	22	5	3	14	38	66	−28	13	Relegated
12	Leksands IF	22	5	2	15	42	65	−23	12	Relegated

=== Östra Svealand 1968 ===
Pos	Team	Pld	W	D	L	GF	GA	GD	Pts	Promotion or relegation
1	Älvsjö AIK	22	17	1	4	59	22	+37	35	Promoted
2	Upsala IF, Uppsala	22	15	3	4	49	21	+28	33	
3	Edsbro IF	22	11	4	7	34	24	+10	26	
4	IF Vesta, Uppsala	22	10	5	7	45	41	+4	25	
5	Väsby IK, Upplands-Väsby	22	10	2	10	46	35	+11	22	
6	Enköpings SK	22	10	2	10	28	26	+2	22	
7	Nynäshamns IF	22	6	8	8	40	36	+4	20	
8	IF Brommapojkarna, Bromma	22	8	4	10	35	42	−7	20	
9	Stockholms IF	22	8	3	11	27	40	−13	19	
10	Spånga IS	22	7	3	12	23	46	−23	17	Relegated
11	Gimo IF	22	6	3	13	31	39	−8	15	Relegated
12	BK Vargarna, Norrtälje	22	4	2	16	22	67	−45	10	Relegated

=== Västra Svealand 1968 ===
Pos	Team	Pld	W	D	L	GF	GA	GD	Pts	Promotion or relegation
1	Malungs IF	22	14	4	4	49	24	+25	32	Promoted
2	Melleruds IF	22	13	3	6	57	29	+28	29	
3	Bengtsfors IF	22	11	5	6	53	50	+3	27	
4	IFK Sunne	22	11	4	7	47	37	+10	26	
5	SK Sifhälla, Säffle	22	11	3	8	30	27	+3	25	
6	IFK Uddevalla	22	10	5	7	36	35	+1	25	
7	IK Oddevold, Uddevalla	22	11	1	10	49	36	+13	23	
8	IF Viken, Åmål	22	8	4	10	38	42	−4	20	
9	IFK Kristinehamn	22	8	3	11	36	40	−4	19	
10	Torsby IF	22	8	3	11	33	56	−23	19	Relegated
11	Kungshamns IF	22	6	5	11	33	42	−9	17	Relegated
12	Bråtens IK, Bofors	22	1	0	21	13	66	−53	2	Relegated

=== Nordöstra Götaland 1968 ===
Pos	Team	Pld	W	D	L	GF	GA	GD	Pts	Promotion or relegation
1	Södertälje SK	22	17	2	3	63	27	+36	36	Promoted
2	Finspångs AIK	22	16	1	5	72	31	+41	33	
3	Motala AIF	22	12	4	6	40	31	+9	28	
4	Flens IF	22	10	1	11	38	35	+3	21	
5	Smedby AIS, Norrköping	22	8	5	9	29	30	−1	21	
6	BK Kenty, Linköping	22	8	5	9	26	33	−7	21	
7	Nyköpings BIS	22	9	2	11	36	37	−1	20	
8	Tranås BoIS	22	8	4	10	33	37	−4	20	
9	IFK Vreta Kloster	22	9	2	11	32	42	−10	20	
10	Skärblacka IF	22	7	4	11	37	39	−2	18	Relegated
11	Mjölby Södra IF	22	5	4	13	22	46	−24	14	Relegated
12	Borens IK, Motala	22	4	4	14	26	66	−40	12	Relegated

=== Nordvästra Götaland 1968 ===
Pos	Team	Pld	W	D	L	GF	GA	GD	Pts	Promotion or relegation
1	Kinna IF	22	14	5	3	43	18	+25	33	Promoted
2	IFK Ulricehamn	22	15	2	5	48	18	+30	32	
3	IF Heimer, Lidköping	22	11	3	8	45	34	+11	25	
4	Gerdskens BK, Alingsås	22	11	3	8	46	48	−2	25	
5	Skara IF	22	10	4	8	47	34	+13	24	
6	IFK Falköping	22	10	2	10	50	45	+5	22	
7	Trollhättans IF	22	8	5	9	45	38	+7	21	
8	IK Kongahälla, Kungälv	22	9	0	13	37	50	−13	18	
9	Limmareds IF	22	6	6	10	33	46	−13	18	
10	Fristads GIF	22	7	3	12	26	49	−23	17	Relegated
11	IFK Tidaholm	22	6	4	12	40	59	−19	16	Relegated
12	Borås AIK	22	6	1	15	28	49	−21	13	Relegated

=== Mellersta Götaland 1968 ===
Pos	Team	Pld	W	D	L	GF	GA	GD	Pts	Promotion or relegation
1	Blomstermåla IK	22	18	2	2	63	20	+43	38	Promoted
2	Emmaboda IS	22	15	4	3	65	35	+30	34	
3	Huskvarna Södra IS	22	13	2	7	54	35	+19	28	
4	Växjö BK	22	11	4	7	43	33	+10	26	
5	Hvetlanda GIF, Vetlanda	22	9	4	9	54	46	+8	22	
6	Vimmerby IF	22	9	3	10	40	31	+9	21	
7	Husqvarna IF, Huskvarna	22	9	3	10	43	50	−7	21	
8	Nässjö IF	22	8	4	10	43	42	+1	20	
9	Mönsterås GIF	22	8	4	10	31	37	−6	20	
10	Oskarshamns AIK	22	6	1	15	26	47	−21	13	Relegated
11	Bergkvara AIF	22	3	6	13	28	56	−28	12	Relegated
12	Hultsfreds AIK	22	4	1	17	28	86	−58	9	Relegated

=== Sydöstra Götaland 1968 ===
Pos	Team	Pld	W	D	L	GF	GA	GD	Pts	Promotion or relegation
1	Hässleholms IF	22	13	5	4	44	27	+17	31	Promoted
2	IFK Kristianstad	22	12	5	5	52	34	+18	29	
3	IFK Hässleholm	22	11	5	6	49	26	+23	27	
4	Högadals IS, Karlshamn	22	9	5	8	41	48	−7	23	
5	Liatorps IF	22	9	4	9	61	50	+11	22	
6	Perstorps SK	22	9	4	9	46	39	+7	22	
7	Vilans BoIF, Kristianstad	22	9	4	9	42	53	−11	22	
8	Tollarps IF	22	8	5	9	48	43	+5	21	
9	IFK Osby	22	7	7	8	40	42	−2	21	
10	Saxemara IF	22	6	6	10	37	46	−9	18	Relegated
11	IFK Knislinge	22	6	4	12	38	57	−19	16	Relegated
12	Asarums IF	22	4	4	14	33	66	−33	12	Relegated

=== Sydvästra Götaland 1968 ===
Pos	Team	Pld	W	D	L	GF	GA	GD	Pts	Promotion or relegation
1	Halmstads BK	22	17	3	2	87	23	+64	37	Promoted
2	Varbergs BoIS	22	13	1	8	51	42	+9	27	
3	Kungsbacka BIK	22	12	2	8	47	33	+14	26	
4	Kullens BK, Göteborg	22	12	2	8	40	39	+1	26	
5	Hovås IF	22	11	3	8	57	51	+6	25	
6	Nyhems BK, Halmstad	22	11	2	9	59	48	+11	24	
7	Göteborgs AIK	22	9	5	8	42	35	+7	23	
8	BK Qviding, Göteborg	22	7	7	8	43	42	+1	21	
9	Redbergslids IK, Göteborg	22	7	5	10	43	46	−3	19	
10	Fässbergs IF, Mölndal	22	8	2	12	32	64	−32	18	Relegated
11	Varbergs GIF	22	6	5	11	46	56	−10	17	Relegated
12	Jonsereds IF	22	0	1	21	18	86	−68	1	Relegated

=== Skåne 1968 ===
Pos	Team	Pld	W	D	L	GF	GA	GD	Pts	Promotion or relegation
1	IK Atleten, Landskrona	22	15	5	2	58	20	+38	35	Promoted
2	Limhamns IF	22	14	4	4	61	32	+29	32	
3	Gunnarstorps IF	22	12	6	4	57	32	+25	30	
4	IFK Ystad	22	13	3	6	46	25	+21	29	
5	Arlövs BI	22	10	4	8	42	33	+9	24	
6	GIF Nike, Lomma	22	11	2	9	38	35	+3	24	
7	Trelleborgs FF	22	7	6	9	42	50	−8	20	
8	Kävlinge GIF	22	7	5	10	34	44	−10	19	
9	Malmö BI	22	5	5	12	35	47	−12	15	
10	Höganäs BK	22	6	3	13	44	58	−14	15	Relegated
11	Råå IF	22	5	2	15	28	57	−29	12	Relegated
12	Stattena IF, Hälsingborg	22	4	1	17	29	81	−52	9	Relegated
