= 1994 Division 3 (Swedish football) =

Swedish League Division 3
- Season: 1994
- Champions: IFK Umeå; Delsbo IF; Hudiksvalls ABK; FC Plavi Team/Stockholm; Nyköpings BIS; Arboga Södra IF; Mjölby AI FF; Lundby IF; Alingsås IF; Ifö/Bromölla IF; Åsa IF; Kulladals FF
- Promoted: 12 teams above and: Bodens BK; Västerhaninge IF; Nässjö FF; Qviding FIF; Älmhults IF
- Relegated: 45 teams

Statistics of Swedish football Division 3 for the 1994 season.

== League standings ==
=== Norra Norrland 1994 ===
Pos	Team	Pld	W	D	L	GF	GA	GD	Pts	Promotion or relegation
1	IFK Umeå	22	15	5	2	48	18	+30	50	Promoted
2	Bodens BK	22	15	4	3	55	21	+34	49	Promotion Playoffs – Promoted
3	IFK Kalix	22	11	8	3	30	15	+15	41	
4	MoDo FF/Domsjö IF	22	9	7	6	39	40	−1	34	
5	Luleå SK	22	7	7	8	37	34	+3	28	
6	Burträsk IK	22	7	6	9	37	43	−6	27	
7	Malmbergets AIF	22	7	6	9	26	38	−12	27	
8	Alviks IK, Luleå	22	7	5	10	36	39	−3	26	
9	Rönnskärs IF, Skelleftehamn	22	7	5	10	28	32	−4	26	Relegation Playoffs – Relegated
10	Älvsby IF	22	7	3	12	24	35	−11	24	Relegated
11	Sunnanå SK	22	5	3	14	25	48	−23	18	Relegated
12	Tavelsjö AIK	22	4	3	15	28	50	−22	15	Relegated

=== Mellersta Norrland 1994 ===
Pos	Team	Pld	W	D	L	GF	GA	GD	Pts	Promotion or relegation
1	Delsbo IF	22	12	5	5	48	31	+17	41	Promoted
2	Frånö SK	22	12	3	7	47	33	+14	39	Promotion Playoffs
3	Frösö IF	22	10	7	5	39	26	+13	37	
4	Selånger FK, Sundsvall	22	8	10	4	31	24	+7	34	
5	Anundsjö IF	22	10	3	9	42	41	+1	33	
6	Strands IF, Hudiksvall	22	8	7	7	37	35	+2	31	
7	Hägglunds IoFK, Örnsköldsvik	22	7	8	7	36	34	+2	29	
8	IF Älgarna, Härnösand	22	8	5	9	34	37	−3	29	
9	Medskogsbrons BK, Sundsvall	22	8	4	10	35	37	−2	28	Relegation Playoffs – Relegated
10	Stockviks FF	22	7	6	9	31	34	−3	27	Relegated
11	Sunds IF, Sundsbruk	22	7	4	11	28	43	−15	25	Relegated
12	Häggenås SK, Lit	22	2	4	16	20	53	−33	10	Relegated

=== Södra Norrland 1994 ===
Pos	Team	Pld	W	D	L	GF	GA	GD	Pts	Promotion or relegation
1	Hudiksvalls ABK	22	16	2	4	49	23	+26	50	Promoted
2	Kvarnsvedens IK	22	14	3	5	58	35	+23	45	Promotion Playoffs
3	Avesta AIK	22	10	7	5	49	38	+11	37	
4	Korsnäs IF FK	22	10	3	9	46	40	+6	33	
5	Hamrånge GIF	22	9	6	7	43	39	+4	33	
6	Bollnäs GIF	22	8	8	6	36	32	+4	32	
7	IFK Mora FK	22	8	6	8	36	39	−3	30	
8	Forssa BK	22	8	4	10	30	30	0	28	
9	Söderhamns FF	22	7	6	9	34	41	−7	27	Relegation Playoffs – Relegated
10	Bälinge IF, Upplands-Bälinge	22	6	5	11	30	31	−1	23	Relegated
11	Strömsbergs IF, Tierp	22	3	7	12	22	38	−16	16	Relegated
12	Sandvikens AIK FK	22	3	3	16	30	77	−47	12	Relegated

=== Norra Svealand 1994 ===
Pos	Team	Pld	W	D	L	GF	GA	GD	Pts	Promotion or relegation
1	FC Plavi Team/Stockholm	22	15	5	2	54	27	+27	50	Promoted
2	IFK Österåker FK, Åkersberga	22	13	6	3	36	19	+17	45	Promotion Playoffs
3	IF Vesta, Uppsala	22	11	3	8	49	27	+22	36	
4	Vallentuna BK	22	10	4	8	47	34	+13	34	
5	Sunnersta AIF	22	9	6	7	41	34	+7	33	
6	FC Järfälla	22	10	1	11	24	41	−17	31	
7	Täby IS	22	8	5	9	35	36	−1	29	
8	Topkapi IK, Stockholm	22	8	4	10	40	45	−5	28	
9	Upsala IF, Uppsala	22	7	7	8	33	39	−6	28	Relegation Playoffs
10	Enebybergs IF	22	8	3	11	38	41	−3	27	Relegated
11	Visby AIK	22	5	2	15	26	49	−23	17	Relegated
12	Films SK	22	3	4	15	27	58	−31	13	Relegated

=== Östra Svealand 1994 ===
Pos	Team	Pld	W	D	L	GF	GA	GD	Pts	Promotion or relegation
1	Nyköpings BIS	22	14	5	3	56	17	+39	47	Promoted
2	Västerhaninge IF	22	12	5	5	49	23	+26	41	Promotion Playoffs – Promoted
3	BK Sport, Eskilstuna	22	12	5	5	49	26	+23	41	
4	IK Bele, Järfälla	22	12	4	6	47	39	+8	40	
5	Huddinge IF	22	9	8	5	52	27	+25	35	
6	Nykvarns SK	22	9	6	7	30	36	−6	33	
7	Vagnhärads SK	22	9	5	8	35	36	−1	32	
8	IFK Tumba	22	8	2	12	30	42	−12	26	
9	IK Franke, Västerås	22	6	7	9	41	50	−9	25	Relegation Playoffs – Relegated
10	Jäders IF	22	3	7	12	30	45	−15	16	Relegated
11	Bagarmossen/Bellevue IK	22	4	3	15	20	58	−38	15	Relegated
12	Kungsörs SK	22	4	3	15	25	65	−40	15	Relegated

=== Västra Svealand 1994 ===
Pos	Team	Pld	W	D	L	GF	GA	GD	Pts	Promotion or relegation
1	Arboga Södra IF	22	15	6	1	47	11	+36	51	Promoted
2	Säffle FF	22	11	8	3	51	33	+18	41	Promotion Playoffs
3	IFK Kumla FK	22	10	5	7	30	26	+4	35	
4	Rynninge IK, Örebro	22	9	5	8	33	23	+10	32	
5	Norrstrands IF, Karlstad	22	9	5	8	36	38	−2	32	
6	Köpings FF	22	8	5	9	36	36	0	29	
7	IK Arvika Fotboll	22	9	1	12	23	35	−12	28	
8	KB Karlskoga	22	7	5	10	40	40	0	26	
9	Filipstads FF	22	6	8	8	29	40	−11	26	Relegation Playoffs
10	Sköllersta IF	22	6	7	9	42	44	−2	25	Relegated
11	Rännbergs IK, Torsby	22	5	6	11	25	43	−18	21	Relegated
12	Kils AIK	22	4	5	13	27	50	−23	17	Relegated

=== Nordöstra Götaland 1994 ===
Pos	Team	Pld	W	D	L	GF	GA	GD	Pts	Promotion or relegation
1	Mjölby AI FF	22	12	4	6	47	31	+16	40	Promoted
2	Smedby BoIK, Kalmar	22	12	2	8	56	36	+20	38	Promotion Playoffs
3	Mönsterås GIF	22	12	2	8	52	40	+12	38	
4	Västerviks FF	22	10	4	8	42	47	−5	34	
5	Gullringens GoIF	22	9	6	7	36	29	+7	33	
6	IFK Kalmar	22	9	5	8	39	36	+3	32	
7	IFK Västervik	22	8	7	7	43	39	+4	31	
8	Tranås AIF FF	22	8	6	8	35	42	−7	30	
9	Hultsfreds FK	22	6	10	6	37	33	+4	28	Relegation Playoffs – Relegated
10	Skeninge IK, Skänninge	22	8	3	11	31	47	−16	27	Relegated
11	Hjulsbro IK, Linköping	22	6	5	11	24	28	−4	23	Relegated
12	Tranås BoIS	22	2	6	14	22	56	−34	12	Relegated

=== Nordvästra Götaland 1994 ===
Pos	Team	Pld	W	D	L	GF	GA	GD	Pts	Promotion or relegation
1	Lundby IF, Göteborg	22	16	4	2	59	20	+39	52	Promoted
2	Qviding FIF, Göteborg	22	15	2	5	58	30	+28	47	Promotion Playoffs – Promoted
3	IFK Trollhättan	22	14	3	5	57	23	+34	45	
4	IK Kongahälla, Kungälv	22	10	6	6	36	26	+10	36	
5	Askims IK	22	11	2	9	41	47	−6	35	
6	Ytterby IS	22	8	5	9	20	22	−2	29	
7	Skärhamns IK	22	7	6	9	35	37	−2	27	
8	Kungshamns IF	22	8	2	12	28	54	−26	26	
9	Onsala BK	22	6	7	9	46	49	−3	25	Relegation Playoffs – Relegated
10	IFK Strömstad	22	6	4	12	42	65	−23	22	Relegated
11	Åsebro IF	22	3	5	14	29	52	−23	14	Relegated
12	IK Zenith, Göteborg	22	2	6	14	24	50	−26	12	Relegated

=== Mellersta Götaland 1994 ===
Pos	Team	Pld	W	D	L	GF	GA	GD	Pts	Promotion or relegation
1	Alingsås IF	22	14	3	5	58	34	+24	45	Promoted
2	Mölnlycke IF	22	13	5	4	35	18	+17	44	Promotion Playoffs
3	IFK Falköping	22	12	5	5	52	29	+23	41	
4	Fässbergs IF, Mölndal	22	10	7	5	37	26	+11	37	
5	IFK Skövde FK	22	8	5	9	33	27	+6	29	
6	Götene IF	22	7	7	8	30	37	−7	28	
7	Skara IF	22	7	5	10	32	36	−4	26	
8	Lerums IS	22	6	7	9	37	43	−6	25	
9	Kållereds SK	22	7	4	11	23	35	−12	25	Relegation Playoffs – Relegated
10	Vårgårda IK	22	6	6	10	34	56	−22	24	Relegated
11	IFK Tidaholm	22	5	7	10	37	47	−10	22	Relegated
12	Arentorps SK	22	2	9	11	29	49	−20	15	Relegated

=== Sydöstra Götaland 1994 ===
Pos	Team	Pld	W	D	L	GF	GA	GD	Pts	Promotion or relegation
1	Ifö/Bromölla IF	22	13	5	4	43	27	+16	44	Promoted
2	Älmhults IF	22	12	6	4	41	25	+16	42	Promotion Playoffs – Promoted
3	Ronneby BK	22	10	5	7	45	31	+14	35	
4	Ljungby IF	22	9	6	7	37	25	+12	33	
5	AIK Atlas, Sturkö	22	8	9	5	40	33	+7	33	
6	Saxemara IF	22	10	2	10	47	38	+9	32	
7	Ystads IF	22	8	8	6	37	33	+4	32	
8	Yngsjö IF	22	8	4	10	34	46	−12	28	
9	Tomelilla IF	22	5	8	9	20	31	−11	23	Relegation Playoffs
10	Askeröds IF	22	5	8	9	26	50	−24	23	Relegated
11	IFK Knislinge	22	6	3	13	22	36	−14	21	Relegated
12	Rödeby AIF	22	2	8	12	27	44	−17	14	Relegated

=== Sydvästra Götaland 1994 ===
Pos	Team	Pld	W	D	L	GF	GA	GD	Pts	Promotion or relegation
1	Åsa IF	22	14	4	4	60	30	+30	46	Promoted
2	Nässjö FF	22	13	5	4	54	32	+22	44	Promotion Playoffs – Promoted
3	Strömsnäsbruks IF	22	11	6	5	43	32	+11	39	
4	IK Tord, Jönköping	22	10	5	7	53	31	+22	35	
5	Bors SK	22	10	4	8	41	34	+7	34	
6	Varbergs GIF	22	8	5	9	38	42	−4	29	
7	Anderstorps IF	22	7	6	9	40	43	−3	27	
8	Gislaveds IS	22	5	7	10	33	47	−14	22	
9	Waggeryds IK, Vaggeryd	22	5	7	10	35	51	−16	22	Relegation Playoffs – Relegated
10	Brämhults IK	22	5	6	11	47	56	−9	21	Relegated
11	IF Norvalla, Väröbacka	22	4	9	9	31	50	−19	21	Relegated
12	Hvetlanda GIF, Vetlanda	22	5	6	11	20	47	−27	21	Relegated

=== Södra Götaland 1994 ===
Pos	Team	Pld	W	D	L	GF	GA	GD	Pts	Promotion or relegation
1	Kulladals FF, Malmö	22	12	4	6	47	38	+9	40	Promoted
2	Högaborgs BK, Helsingborg	22	10	6	6	47	23	+24	36	Promotion Playoffs
3	Husie IF	22	10	5	7	48	37	+11	35	
4	Ängelholms FF	22	10	4	8	45	49	−4	34	
5	Laholms FK	22	8	8	6	39	36	+3	32	
6	BK Olympic, Malmö	22	9	5	8	35	35	0	32	
7	Arlövs BI	22	8	7	7	43	34	+9	31	
8	Limhamns IF	22	7	10	5	37	32	+5	31	
9	Kirsebergs IF, Malmö	22	9	4	9	38	34	+4	31	Relegation Playoffs – Relegated
10	FBK Balkan, Malmö	22	8	4	10	24	30	−6	28	Relegated
11	BK Astrio, Halmstad	22	7	6	9	30	46	−16	27	Relegated
12	Listorps IF	22	1	3	18	24	63	−39	6	Relegated
