= 1960 Division 3 (Swedish football) =

Swedish League Division 3
- Season: 1960
- Champions: IFK Kalix; Sollefteå GIF; GIF Sundsvall; Hallstahammars SK; Sundbybergs IK; IFK Sunne; Åtvidabergs FF; Kungshamns IF; Huskvarna Södra IS; Hässleholms IF; IS Halmia; Malmö BI
- Promoted: 12 teams above
- Relegated: 36 teams

Statistics of Swedish football Division 3 for the 1960 season.

== League standings ==
=== Norra Norrland 1960 ===
Pos	Team	Pld	W	D	L	GF	GA	GD	Pts	Promotion or relegation
1	IFK Kalix	18	13	2	3	43	19	+24	28	Promoted
2	Sunnanå SK	18	12	1	5	44	26	+18	25	
3	Norsjö IF	18	9	5	4	49	34	+15	23	
4	Piteå IF	18	10	2	6	45	36	+9	22	
5	Luleå SK	18	9	3	6	36	29	+7	21	
6	Skellefteå IF	18	6	4	8	27	33	−6	16	
7	Överkalix IF	18	5	4	9	25	37	−12	14	
8	Alviks IK	18	6	1	11	34	44	−10	13	Relegated
9	Lira BK, Luleå	18	3	4	11	25	41	−16	10	Relegated
10	IK Vargarna, Byske	18	3	2	13	26	55	−29	8	Relegated

=== Mellersta Norrland 1960 ===
Pos	Team	Pld	W	D	L	GF	GA	GD	Pts	Promotion or relegation
1	Sollefteå GIF	18	14	0	4	56	24	+32	28	Promoted
2	Sandkerns SK, Umeå	18	11	5	2	50	24	+26	27	
3	Gimonäs CK, Umeå	18	11	3	4	55	24	+31	25	
4	Sandviks IK, Holmsund	18	7	7	4	34	22	+12	21	
5	Köpmanholmens IF	18	8	3	7	30	26	+4	19	
6	Alfredshems IK	18	7	5	6	26	30	−4	19	
7	IFK Härnösand	18	4	6	8	38	40	−2	14	
8	Frånö SK	18	4	4	10	29	46	−17	12	Relegated
9	Obbola IK	18	5	1	12	24	46	−22	11	Relegated
10	Ope IF	18	1	2	15	14	75	−61	4	Relegated

=== Södra Norrland 1960 ===
Pos	Team	Pld	W	D	L	GF	GA	GD	Pts	Promotion or relegation
1	GIF Sundsvall	22	15	6	1	66	28	+38	36	Promoted
2	Kubikenborgs IF, Sundsvall	22	14	2	6	54	32	+22	30	
3	Söderhamns IF	22	12	4	6	40	26	+14	28	
4	Sandvikens AIK	22	11	5	6	51	39	+12	27	
5	Ljusdals IF	22	11	2	9	47	48	−1	24	
6	Fagerviks GF, Timrå	22	9	5	8	38	42	−4	23	
7	Högbo AIK, Sandviken	22	9	3	10	33	31	+2	21	
8	Edsbyns IF	22	8	4	10	50	48	+2	20	
9	Ljunga IF, Ljungaverk	22	8	2	12	48	51	−3	18	
10	Örta IF, Sandviken	22	7	4	11	38	48	−10	18	Relegated
11	Gefle IF, Gävle	22	4	5	13	32	56	−24	13	Relegated
12	Norrsundets IF	22	2	2	18	32	80	−48	6	Relegated

=== Norra Svealand 1960 ===
Pos	Team	Pld	W	D	L	GF	GA	GD	Pts	Promotion or relegation
1	Hallstahammars SK	22	11	7	4	41	23	+18	29	Promoted
2	IF Rune, Kungsr	22	11	4	7	62	47	+15	26	
3	IF Vesta, Uppsala	22	10	6	6	40	40	0	26	
4	Västerås SK	22	10	4	8	47	32	+15	24	
5	IFK Grängesberg	22	9	6	7	46	34	+12	24	
6	IK Sirius, Uppsala	22	8	8	6	42	35	+7	24	
7	Vansbro AIK	22	8	6	8	44	47	−3	22	
8	Skutskärs IF	22	6	9	7	43	50	−7	21	
9	Rimbo IF	22	8	4	10	36	41	−5	20	
10	Enköpings SK	22	5	7	10	33	52	−19	17	Relegated
11	Ludvika FFI	22	6	4	12	38	53	−15	16	Relegated
12	IFK Västerås	22	3	9	10	32	50	−18	15	Relegated

=== Östra Svealand 1960 ===
Pos	Team	Pld	W	D	L	GF	GA	GD	Pts	Promotion or relegation
1	Sundbybergs IK	18	14	2	2	50	19	+31	30	Promoted
2	Katrineholms SK	18	13	3	2	63	34	+29	29	
3	Karlbergs BK, Stockholm	18	9	3	6	43	41	+2	21	
4	IK Tellus, Stockholm	18	8	4	6	48	41	+7	20	
5	Hälleforsnäs IF	18	9	1	8	37	40	−3	19	
6	Enskede IK	18	6	6	6	37	33	+4	18	
7	Malmköpings IF	18	7	0	11	36	50	−14	14	
8	IK Sture, Stockholm	18	4	3	11	35	45	−10	11	Relegated
9	Hagalunds IS, Solna	18	4	2	12	25	47	−22	10	Relegated
10	Ängby IF	18	3	2	13	36	60	−24	8	Relegated

=== Västra Svealand 1960 ===
Pos	Team	Pld	W	D	L	GF	GA	GD	Pts	Promotion or relegation
1	IFK Sunne	18	12	2	4	51	24	+27	26	Promoted
2	Rynninge IK, Örebro	18	11	3	4	34	26	+8	25	
3	IFK Kristinehamn	18	8	7	3	41	36	+5	23	
4	Karlskoga IF	18	9	3	6	41	36	+5	21	
5	Arvika BK	18	8	2	8	29	26	+3	18	
6	IFK Bofors	18	7	4	7	26	25	+1	18	
7	Karlstads FF	18	7	3	8	39	29	+10	17	
8	IK Viking, Hagfors	18	5	5	8	36	54	−18	15	Relegated
9	IFK Nora	18	4	1	13	39	68	−29	9	Relegated
10	Hällefors AIF	18	3	2	13	33	45	−12	8	Relegated

=== Nordöstra Götaland 1960 ===
Pos	Team	Pld	W	D	L	GF	GA	GD	Pts	Promotion or relegation
1	Åtvidabergs FF	18	13	2	3	63	24	+39	28	Promoted
2	BK Kenty, Linköping	18	9	5	4	53	38	+15	23	
3	Gamleby IF	18	11	0	7	43	33	+10	22	
4	Västerviks AIS	18	8	4	6	45	34	+11	20	
5	Oskarshamns AIK	18	7	4	7	35	33	+2	18	
6	Finspångs AIK	18	7	4	7	44	45	−1	18	
7	Skärblacka IF	18	7	4	7	35	36	−1	18	
8	IF Sylvia, Norrköping	18	5	4	9	36	59	−23	14	Relegated
9	Kimstads GIF	18	4	3	11	19	40	−21	11	Relegated
10	Fornåsa IF	18	3	2	13	32	63	−31	8	Relegated

=== Nordvästra Götaland 1960 ===
Pos	Team	Pld	W	D	L	GF	GA	GD	Pts	Promotion or relegation
1	Kungshamns IF	18	14	1	3	48	24	+24	29	Promoted
2	Kullens BK, Göteborg	18	12	2	4	44	27	+17	26	
3	IFK Trollhättan	18	9	6	3	41	27	+14	24	
4	Jonsereds IF	18	8	2	8	41	33	+8	18	
5	BK Häcken, Göteborg	18	8	2	8	34	27	+7	18	
6	Håfreströms IF	18	8	0	10	35	48	−13	16	
7	Marieholms BIK, Göteborg	18	5	5	8	25	27	−2	15	
8	IFK Åmål	18	5	3	10	17	29	−12	13	Relegated
9	Utsiktens BK, Göteborg	18	5	2	11	27	39	−12	12	Relegated
10	IF Stendy, Göteborg	18	4	1	13	22	53	−31	9	Relegated

=== Mellersta Götaland 1960 ===
Pos	Team	Pld	W	D	L	GF	GA	GD	Pts	Promotion or relegation
1	Huskvarna Södra IS	18	12	3	3	48	21	+27	27	Promoted
2	IF Hallby, Jönköping	18	11	3	4	51	28	+23	25	
3	Viskafors IF	18	11	3	4	36	28	+8	25	
4	Kinna IF	18	9	4	5	40	18	+22	22	
5	Vänersborgs IF	18	7	4	7	34	35	−1	18	
6	Tranås BoIS	18	8	0	10	37	35	+2	16	
7	IF Heimer, Lidköping	18	5	6	7	29	32	−3	16	
8	IFK Falköping	18	5	4	9	29	37	−8	14	Relegated
9	Hvetlanda GIF, Vetlanda	18	3	4	11	16	45	−29	10	Relegated
10	Vargöns SK	18	1	5	12	21	62	−41	7	Relegated

=== Sydöstra Götaland 1960 ===
Pos	Team	Pld	W	D	L	GF	GA	GD	Pts	Promotion or relegation
1	Hässleholms IF	18	10	4	4	35	19	+16	24	Promoted
2	IFK Karlshamn	18	11	2	5	41	34	+7	24	
3	Ronneby BK	18	9	3	6	36	23	+13	21	
4	Saltö BK, Karlskrona	18	8	4	6	38	24	+14	20	
5	Olofströms IF	18	8	1	9	37	34	+3	17	
6	IFK Hässleholm	18	6	5	7	30	27	+3	17	
7	Tollarps IF	18	8	1	9	36	37	−1	17	
8	Mönsterås GIF	18	6	4	8	35	43	−8	16	Relegated
9	Nybro IF	18	4	4	10	26	48	−22	12	Relegated
10	Kalmar Södra IF	18	3	6	9	15	40	−25	12	Relegated

=== Sydvästra Götaland 1960 ===
Pos	Team	Pld	W	D	L	GF	GA	GD	Pts	Promotion or relegation
1	IS Halmia, Halmstad	18	15	1	2	65	19	+46	31	Promoted
2	Gislaveds IS	18	12	4	2	47	22	+25	28	
3	Tranemo IF	18	11	4	3	41	17	+24	26	
4	Gnosjö IF	18	8	2	8	35	31	+4	18	
5	Varbergs BoIS	18	8	1	9	40	36	+4	17	
6	IFK Värnamo	18	6	5	7	26	41	−15	17	
7	Strömsnsbruks IF	18	6	3	9	29	45	−16	15	
8	Älmhults IF	18	5	4	9	21	39	−18	14	Relegated
9	IF Leikin, Halmstad	18	6	1	11	32	41	−9	13	Relegated
10	Limmareds IF	18	0	1	17	11	56	−45	1	Relegated

=== Södra Götaland 1960 ===
Pos	Team	Pld	W	D	L	GF	GA	GD	Pts	Promotion or relegation
1	Malmö BI	20	14	0	6	43	22	+21	28	Promoted
2	Lunds BK	20	11	4	5	40	31	+9	26	
3	Högaborgs BK, Helsingborg	20	12	0	8	44	28	+16	24	
4	Tomelilla IF	20	9	6	5	40	32	+8	24	
5	IFK Ystad	20	9	4	7	34	39	−5	22	
6	Ängelholms IF	20	8	3	9	33	48	−15	19	
7	Billesholms GIF	20	8	2	10	41	41	0	18	
8	IF Allians, Malmö	20	6	5	9	28	32	−4	17	
9	Trelleborgs FF	20	7	2	11	31	30	+1	16	Relegated
10	Åstorps IF	20	5	4	11	25	39	−14	14	Relegated
11	Lunds GIF	20	4	4	12	25	42	−17	12	Relegated
