= 1993 Division 3 (Swedish football) =

Swedish League Division 3
- Season: 1993
- Champions: Gimonäs CK; Obbola IK; Sandvikens IF; Helenelunds IK; IF Sylvia; Gideonsbergs IF; Linköpings FF; Trollhättans FK; IF Heimer; Kristianstads FF; IS Halmia; IFK Malmö FK
- Promoted: 12 teams above and: Täfteå IK; Heby AIF; Tyresö FF; Åtvidabergs FF; Växjö Norra IF
- Relegated: 36 teams

Statistics of Swedish football Division 3 for the 1993 season.

== League standings ==
=== Norra Norrland 1993 ===
Pos	Team	Pld	W	D	L	GF	GA	GD	Pts	Promotion or relegation
1	Gimonäs CK	22	16	3	3	61	16	+45	51	Promoted
2	Täfteå IK	22	14	3	5	42	21	+21	45	Promotion Playoffs – Promoted
3	Luleå SK	22	12	5	5	47	24	+23	41	
4	Alviks IK, Luleå	22	9	5	8	33	30	+3	32	
5	Sunnanå SK	22	8	7	7	37	37	0	31	
6	Malmbergets AIF	22	9	3	10	35	35	0	30	
7	Tavelsjö AIK	22	9	2	11	27	30	−3	29	
8	Burträsk IK	22	8	4	10	38	42	−4	28	
9	Älvsby IF	22	9	1	12	42	50	−8	28	
10	Gammelstads IF, Luleå	22	7	4	11	27	39	−12	25	Relegated
11	Kiruna BoIS	22	7	2	13	31	53	−22	23	Relegated
12	Malå IF	22	3	3	16	25	68	−43	12	Relegated

=== Mellersta Norrland 1993 ===
Pos	Team	Pld	W	D	L	GF	GA	GD	Pts	Promotion or relegation
1	Obbola IK	22	18	2	2	57	19	+38	56	Promoted
2	Häggenås SK, Lit	22	11	7	4	43	24	+19	40	Promotion Playoffs
3	Sund IF, Sundsbruk	22	12	4	6	38	24	+14	40	
4	Medskogsbrons BK, Sundsvall	22	9	6	7	39	35	+4	33	
5	Frånö SK	22	9	5	8	37	40	−3	32	
6	Hägglunds IoFK, Örnsköldsvik	22	7	9	6	37	32	+5	30	
7	IF Älgarna, Härnösand	22	8	3	11	32	33	−1	27	
8	Stockviks FF	22	6	8	8	37	35	+2	26	
9	Anundsjö IF	22	7	5	10	35	44	−9	26	
10	Iggesunds IK	22	6	5	11	25	49	−24	23	Relegated
11	Östersunds FF	22	5	6	11	41	48	−7	21	Relegated
12	Arnäs IF	22	2	4	16	23	61	−38	10	Relegated

=== Södra Norrland 1993 ===
Pos	Team	Pld	W	D	L	GF	GA	GD	Pts	Promotion or relegation
1	Sandvikens IF	22	14	5	3	57	24	+33	47	Promoted
2	Heby AIF	22	11	5	6	45	28	+17	38	Promotion Playoffs – Promoted
3	Söderhamns FF	22	10	8	4	34	23	+11	38	
4	IFK Mora FK	22	9	7	6	47	34	+13	34	
5	Forssa BK	22	8	9	5	41	39	+2	33	
6	Kvarnsvedens IK	22	7	7	8	40	39	+1	28	
7	Sandvikens AIK	22	7	7	8	43	46	−3	28	
8	Avesta AIK	22	8	3	11	40	44	−4	27	
9	Strömsbergs IF, Tierp	22	4	12	6	30	34	−4	24	
10	IK Sätra, Gävle	22	6	5	11	23	47	−24	23	Relegated
11	Brynäs IF, Gävle	22	4	9	9	22	35	−13	21	Relegated
12	IFK Gävle	22	3	5	14	32	61	−29	14	Relegated

=== Norra Svealand 1993 ===
Pos	Team	Pld	W	D	L	GF	GA	GD	Pts	Promotion or relegation
1	Helenelunds IK	22	16	2	4	50	30	+20	50	Promoted
2	IFK Österåker, Åkersberga	22	14	5	3	50	18	+32	47	Promotion Playoffs
3	FC Plavi Team/Stockholm	22	14	3	5	59	33	+26	45	
4	Vallentuna BK	22	13	3	6	58	33	+25	42	
5	Bälinge IF, Upplands-Bälinge	22	9	5	8	38	43	−5	32	
6	Enebybergs IF	22	7	3	12	38	41	−3	24	
7	Upsala IF, Uppsala	22	6	6	10	27	36	−9	24	
8	Täby IS	22	7	3	12	34	53	−19	24	
9	Sunnersta AIF	22	5	7	10	42	49	−7	22	
10	Råsunda IS, Solna	22	6	4	12	42	59	−17	22	Relegated
11	IFK Lidingö Fotboll	22	5	7	10	30	47	−17	22	Relegated
12	Bro IK, Upplands-Bro	22	4	4	14	31	57	−26	16	Relegated

=== Östra Svealand 1993 ===
Pos	Team	Pld	W	D	L	GF	GA	GD	Pts	Promotion or relegation
1	IF Sylvia, Norrköping	22	13	7	2	46	18	+28	46	Promoted
2	Tyresö FF	22	13	7	2	40	13	+27	46	Promotion Playoffs – Promoted
3	Vagnhärads SK	22	12	5	5	47	30	+17	41	
4	Västerhaninge IF	22	10	6	6	43	32	+11	36	
5	Huddinge IF	22	8	8	6	35	37	−2	32	
6	Nyköpings BIS	22	7	9	6	35	32	+3	30	
7	Nykvarns SK	22	7	5	10	38	41	−3	26	
8	IFK Tumba	22	7	5	10	33	45	−12	26	
9	Jäders IF	22	8	1	13	39	54	−15	25	
10	Smedby AIS, Norrköping	22	5	8	9	31	37	−6	23	Relegated
11	FoC Farsta	22	5	4	13	35	44	−9	19	Relegated
12	Värmbols FC, Katrineholm	22	3	3	16	19	58	−39	12	Relegated

=== Västra Svealand 1993 ===
Pos	Team	Pld	W	D	L	GF	GA	GD	Pts	Promotion or relegation
1	Gideonsbergs IF, Västerås	22	16	1	5	66	37	+29	49	Promoted
2	Köpings FF	22	12	5	5	55	30	+25	41	Promotion Playoffs
3	Kils AIK	22	11	3	8	32	32	0	36	
4	IFK Kumla	22	9	6	7	44	40	+4	33	
5	Rynninge IK, Örebro	22	9	4	9	38	44	−6	31	
6	IK Franke, Västerås	22	8	6	8	34	34	0	30	
7	Rännbergs IK, Torsby	22	9	3	10	45	47	−2	30	
8	Säffle FF	22	8	4	10	41	46	−5	28	
9	Filipstads FF	22	7	6	9	43	54	−11	27	
10	Adolfsbergs IK, Örebro	22	5	8	9	33	40	−7	23	Relegated
11	IFK Grängesberg	22	6	4	12	32	55	−23	22	Relegated
12	Västerås IK	22	5	4	13	44	48	−4	19	Relegated

=== Nordöstra Götaland 1993 ===
Pos	Team	Pld	W	D	L	GF	GA	GD	Pts	Promotion or relegation
1	Linköpings FF	22	17	3	2	60	25	+35	54	Promoted
2	Åtvidabergs FF	22	14	4	4	57	18	+39	46	Promotion Playoffs – Promoted
3	Hultsfreds FK	22	12	4	6	39	32	+7	40	
4	Mönsterås GIF	22	9	3	10	53	58	−5	30	
5	Hvetlanda GIF, Vetlanda	22	8	5	9	41	46	−5	29	
6	Tranås BoIS	22	8	4	10	39	35	+4	28	
7	Västerviks FF	22	8	4	10	38	41	−3	28	
8	Tranås AIF	22	7	6	9	37	44	−7	27	
9	FC Jönköping	22	8	2	12	35	61	−26	26	
10	Malmslätts AIK	22	6	5	11	32	39	−7	23	Relegated
11	BK Zeros, Motala	22	7	1	14	33	48	−15	22	Relegated
12	Blomstermåla IK	22	7	1	14	33	50	−17	22	Relegated

=== Nordvästra Götaland 1993 ===
Pos	Team	Pld	W	D	L	GF	GA	GD	Pts	Promotion or relegation
1	Trollhättans FK	22	13	5	4	51	17	+34	44	Promoted
2	IK Kongahälla, Kungälv	22	13	5	4	46	24	+22	44	Promotion Playoffs
3	Qviding FIF, Göteborg	22	13	5	4	56	35	+21	44	
4	Kungshamns IF	22	11	4	7	40	39	+1	37	
5	Ytterby IS	22	10	4	8	29	32	−3	34	
6	Lundby IF, Göteborg	22	9	6	7	50	36	+14	33	
7	Lerums IS	22	9	1	12	42	49	−7	28	
8	IFK Trollhättan	22	7	5	10	41	46	−5	26	
9	Skärhamns IK	22	7	3	12	46	49	−3	24	
10	Mossens BK, Göteborg	22	7	3	12	44	54	−10	24	Relegated
11	Henåns IF	22	5	3	14	32	55	−23	18	Relegated
12	Grebbestads IF	22	2	8	12	30	71	−41	14	Relegated

=== Mellersta Götaland 1993 ===
Pos	Team	Pld	W	D	L	GF	GA	GD	Pts	Promotion or relegation
1	IF Heimer, Lidköping	22	15	4	3	56	21	+35	49	Promoted
2	Arentorps SK	22	13	5	4	49	36	+13	44	Promotion Playoffs
3	IFK Falköping	22	13	3	6	46	29	+17	42	
4	Kållereds SK	22	10	6	6	47	33	+14	36	
5	IFK Skövde	22	10	3	9	44	32	+12	33	
6	Alingsås IF	22	10	3	9	43	34	+9	33	
7	Skara IF	22	8	7	7	37	33	+4	31	
8	Mölnlycke IF	22	8	5	9	36	37	−1	29	
9	Götene IF	22	6	4	12	38	46	−8	22	
10	Godhem/HTIF	22	5	5	12	30	51	−21	20	Relegated
11	IFK Hällingsjö	22	5	3	14	30	73	−43	18	Relegated
12	Hovås IF	22	2	6	14	27	58	−31	12	Relegated

=== Sydöstra Götaland 1993 ===
Pos	Team	Pld	W	D	L	GF	GA	GD	Pts	Promotion or relegation
1	Kristianstads FF	22	13	5	4	46	25	+21	44	Promoted
2	Växjö Norra IF	22	13	4	5	41	22	+19	43	Promotion Playoffs – Promoted
3	AIK Atlas, Sturkö	22	12	4	6	35	24	+11	40	
4	Ifö/Bromölla IF	22	8	8	6	36	29	+7	32	
5	Älmhults IF	22	9	5	8	41	37	+4	32	
6	Saxemara IF	22	8	5	9	44	38	+6	29	
7	Yngsjö IF	22	8	5	9	33	41	−8	29	
8	IFK Kalmar	22	8	5	9	32	42	−10	29	
9	Ronneby BK	22	7	7	8	47	39	+8	28	
10	Lönsboda GIF	22	7	5	10	34	42	−8	26	Relegated
11	Sjöbo IF	22	7	2	13	35	36	−1	23	Relegated
12	Asarums IF FK	22	2	5	15	22	71	−49	11	Relegated

=== Sydvästra Götaland 1993 ===
Pos	Team	Pld	W	D	L	GF	GA	GD	Pts	Promotion or relegation
1	IS Halmia, Halmstad	22	11	7	4	54	26	+28	40	Promoted
2	IK Tord, Jönköping	22	12	3	7	53	35	+18	39	Promotion Playoffs
3	Åsa IF	22	11	4	7	45	36	+9	37	
4	Onsala BK	22	8	8	6	34	33	+1	32	
5	IF Norvalla, Väröbacka	22	8	7	7	35	37	−2	31	
6	Ljungby IF	22	8	5	9	35	43	−8	29	
7	Laholms FK	22	7	7	8	28	28	0	28	
8	Gislaveds IS	22	8	4	10	27	35	−8	28	
9	Waggeryds IK, Vaggeryd	22	8	4	10	28	41	−13	28	
10	Bankeryds SK	22	7	6	9	39	38	+1	27	Relegated
11	Mariedals IK, Borås	22	7	3	12	42	53	−11	24	Relegated
12	Byttorps IF	22	6	4	12	29	44	−15	22	Relegated

=== Södra Götaland 1993 ===
Pos	Team	Pld	W	D	L	GF	GA	GD	Pts	Promotion or relegation
1	IFK Malmö FK	22	17	1	4	74	24	+50	52	Promoted
2	Högaborgs BK, Helsingborg	22	14	4	4	55	26	+29	46	Promotion Playoffs
3	Kirsebergs IF, Malmö	22	12	7	3	52	22	+30	43	
4	Ystads IF	22	10	5	7	54	45	+9	35	
5	Kulladals FF	22	10	3	9	39	32	+7	33	
6	Ängelholms FF	22	9	6	7	44	47	−3	33	
7	Husie IF	22	9	4	9	49	48	+1	31	
8	BK Olympic, Malmö	22	7	6	9	43	40	+3	27	
9	FBK Balkan, Malmö	22	5	9	8	30	36	−6	24	
10	Ramlösa BoIS	22	5	6	11	35	61	−26	21	Relegated
11	Borstahusens BK, Landskrona	22	4	4	14	28	62	−34	16	Relegated
12	Vellinge IF	22	1	3	18	17	77	−60	6	Relegated
