= 1959 Division 3 (Swedish football) =

Swedish League Division 3
- Season: 1959
- Champions: Bodens BK; IF Friska Viljor; Wifsta/Östrands IF; Malungs IF; Södertälje SK; IFK Kumla; IF Saab; Billingsfors IK; Tidaholms GIF; Perstorps SK; Östers IF; Gunnarstorps IF
- Promoted: 12 teams above
- Relegated: 36 teams

Statistics of Swedish football Division 3 for the 1959 season.

== League standings ==
=== Norra Norrland 1959 ===
| Pos | Team | Pld | W | D | L | GF | GA | GD | Pts | Promotion or relegation |
|---|---|---|---|---|---|---|---|---|---|---|
| 1 | Bodens BK | 18 | 14 | 1 | 3 | 55 | 19 | +36 | 29 | Promoted |
| 2 | Piteå IF | 18 | 10 | 4 | 4 | 53 | 37 | +16 | 24 | |
| 3 | Skellefteå IF | 18 | 9 | 3 | 6 | 45 | 40 | +5 | 21 | |
| 4 | IFK Kalix | 18 | 6 | 8 | 4 | 35 | 28 | +7 | 20 | |
| 5 | Sunnanå SK | 18 | 5 | 7 | 6 | 32 | 31 | +1 | 17 | |
| 6 | Lira BK, Luleå | 18 | 6 | 3 | 9 | 28 | 39 | −11 | 15 | |
| 7 | IK Vargarna, Byske | 18 | 6 | 3 | 9 | 30 | 43 | −13 | 15 | |
| 8 | Clemensnäs IF | 18 | 5 | 4 | 9 | 27 | 43 | −16 | 14 | Relegated |
| 9 | Haparanda SK-Taktik | 18 | 5 | 3 | 10 | 27 | 36 | −9 | 13 | Relegated |
| 10 | Rönnskärs IF, Skelleftehamn | 18 | 5 | 2 | 11 | 24 | 40 | −16 | 12 | Relegated |

=== Mellersta Norrland 1959 ===
| Pos | Team | Pld | W | D | L | GF | GA | GD | Pts | Promotion or relegation |
|---|---|---|---|---|---|---|---|---|---|---|
| 1 | IF Friska Viljor, Örnsköldsvik | 20 | 15 | 1 | 4 | 65 | 27 | +38 | 31 | Promoted |
| 2 | Sandåkerns SK, Umeå | 20 | 15 | 1 | 4 | 67 | 36 | +31 | 31 | |
| 3 | Sandviks IK, Holmsund | 20 | 13 | 2 | 5 | 60 | 22 | +38 | 28 | |
| 4 | Sollefteå GIF | 20 | 11 | 3 | 6 | 53 | 33 | +20 | 25 | |
| 5 | IFK Härnösand | 20 | 10 | 4 | 6 | 53 | 42 | +11 | 24 | |
| 6 | Köpmanholmens IF | 20 | 8 | 3 | 9 | 36 | 34 | +2 | 19 | |
| 7 | Gimonäs CK, Umeå | 20 | 6 | 6 | 8 | 41 | 50 | −9 | 18 | |
| 8 | Frånö SK | 20 | 7 | 2 | 11 | 34 | 60 | −26 | 16 | |
| 9 | Husums IF | 20 | 5 | 5 | 10 | 25 | 51 | −26 | 15 | Relegated |
| 10 | Domsjö IF | 20 | 4 | 0 | 16 | 20 | 48 | −28 | 8 | Relegated |
| 11 | Krokom-Dvärstts IF | 20 | 1 | 3 | 16 | 20 | 48 | −28 | 5 | Relegated |

=== Södra Norrland 1959 ===
| Pos | Team | Pld | W | D | L | GF | GA | GD | Pts | Promotion or relegation |
|---|---|---|---|---|---|---|---|---|---|---|
| 1 | Wifsta/Östrands IF, Timrå | 22 | 19 | 1 | 2 | 74 | 20 | +54 | 39 | Promoted |
| 2 | Sandvikens AIK | 22 | 16 | 3 | 3 | 73 | 27 | +46 | 35 | |
| 3 | Söderhamns IF | 22 | 14 | 2 | 6 | 48 | 33 | +15 | 30 | |
| 4 | Ljusdals IF | 22 | 12 | 4 | 6 | 55 | 40 | +15 | 28 | |
| 5 | Högbo AIK, Sandviken | 22 | 8 | 4 | 10 | 36 | 33 | +3 | 20 | |
| 6 | Skutskärs IF | 22 | 9 | 2 | 11 | 30 | 36 | −6 | 20 | |
| 7 | Ljunga IF, Ljungaverk | 22 | 6 | 6 | 10 | 15 | 29 | −14 | 18 | |
| 8 | Örta IF, Sandviken | 22 | 6 | 5 | 11 | 35 | 45 | −10 | 17 | |
| 9 | Gefle IF, Gävle | 22 | 5 | 7 | 10 | 26 | 41 | −15 | 17 | |
| 10 | Hofors AIF | 22 | 5 | 5 | 12 | 21 | 43 | −22 | 15 | Relegated |
| 11 | Matfors IF | 22 | 6 | 2 | 14 | 35 | 59 | −24 | 14 | Relegated |
| 12 | Ljusne AIK | 22 | 4 | 3 | 15 | 31 | 71 | −40 | 11 | Relegated |

=== Norra Svealand 1959 ===
| Pos | Team | Pld | W | D | L | GF | GA | GD | Pts | Promotion or relegation |
|---|---|---|---|---|---|---|---|---|---|---|
| 1 | Malungs IF | 18 | 13 | 1 | 4 | 38 | 21 | +17 | 27 | Promoted |
| 2 | IF Rune, Kungsör | 18 | 11 | 3 | 4 | 38 | 24 | +14 | 25 | |
| 3 | Enköpings SK | 18 | 8 | 4 | 6 | 26 | 25 | +1 | 20 | |
| 4 | IFK Grängesberg | 18 | 9 | 1 | 8 | 32 | 22 | +10 | 19 | |
| 5 | IF Vesta, Uppsala | 18 | 7 | 5 | 6 | 31 | 26 | +5 | 19 | |
| 6 | Rimbo IF | 18 | 8 | 2 | 8 | 33 | 33 | 0 | 18 | |
| 7 | Ludvika FFI | 18 | 7 | 3 | 8 | 23 | 25 | −2 | 17 | |
| 8 | Surahammars IF | 18 | 6 | 4 | 8 | 31 | 40 | −9 | 16 | Relegated |
| 9 | Säters IF | 18 | 4 | 2 | 12 | 20 | 34 | −14 | 10 | Relegated |
| 10 | Falu BS | 18 | 3 | 3 | 12 | 25 | 47 | −22 | 9 | Relegated |

=== Östra Svealand 1959 ===
| Pos | Team | Pld | W | D | L | GF | GA | GD | Pts | Promotion or relegation |
|---|---|---|---|---|---|---|---|---|---|---|
| 1 | Södertälje SK | 18 | 13 | 1 | 4 | 61 | 35 | +26 | 27 | Promoted |
| 2 | Sundbybergs IK | 18 | 13 | 0 | 5 | 62 | 24 | +38 | 26 | |
| 3 | IK Sture, Stockholm | 18 | 12 | 1 | 5 | 56 | 32 | +24 | 25 | |
| 4 | Karlbergs BK, Stockholm | 18 | 10 | 1 | 7 | 53 | 33 | +20 | 21 | |
| 5 | IK Tellus, Stockholm | 18 | 8 | 3 | 7 | 35 | 32 | +3 | 19 | |
| 6 | Hagalunds IS, Solna | 18 | 8 | 3 | 7 | 31 | 35 | −4 | 19 | |
| 7 | Hälleforsnäs IF | 18 | 7 | 1 | 10 | 35 | 52 | −17 | 15 | |
| 8 | Huvudsta IS, Solna | 18 | 5 | 4 | 9 | 43 | 48 | −5 | 14 | Relegated |
| 9 | Vasalunds IF, Solna | 18 | 5 | 2 | 11 | 28 | 48 | −20 | 12 | Relegated |
| 10 | IF Triangeln, Kalhäll | 18 | 1 | 0 | 17 | 20 | 85 | −65 | 2 | Relegated |

=== Västra Svealand 1959 ===
| Pos | Team | Pld | W | D | L | GF | GA | GD | Pts | Promotion or relegation |
|---|---|---|---|---|---|---|---|---|---|---|
| 1 | IFK Kumla | 20 | 17 | 1 | 2 | 56 | 12 | +44 | 35 | Promoted |
| 2 | Karlskoga BK | 20 | 12 | 2 | 6 | 53 | 39 | +14 | 26 | |
| 3 | Rynninge IF, Örebro | 20 | 9 | 7 | 4 | 38 | 25 | +13 | 25 | |
| 4 | Hällefors AIF | 20 | 11 | 2 | 7 | 54 | 44 | +10 | 24 | |
| 5 | IFK Kristinehamn | 20 | 9 | 5 | 6 | 44 | 35 | +9 | 23 | |
| 6 | Arvika BK | 20 | 9 | 4 | 7 | 35 | 37 | −2 | 22 | |
| 7 | IFK Bofors | 20 | 9 | 2 | 9 | 29 | 33 | −4 | 20 | |
| 8 | Karlstads FF | 20 | 7 | 5 | 8 | 42 | 43 | −1 | 19 | |
| 9 | Forshaga IF | 20 | 5 | 3 | 12 | 32 | 54 | −22 | 13 | Relegated |
| 10 | BK Forward, Örebro | 20 | 4 | 1 | 15 | 27 | 49 | −22 | 9 | Relegated |
| 11 | Karslunds IF, Örebro | 20 | 1 | 2 | 17 | 14 | 53 | −39 | 4 | Relegated |

=== Nordöstra Götaland 1959 ===
| Pos | Team | Pld | W | D | L | GF | GA | GD | Pts | Promotion or relegation |
|---|---|---|---|---|---|---|---|---|---|---|
| 1 | IF Saab, Linköping | 18 | 13 | 2 | 3 | 47 | 15 | +32 | 28 | Promoted |
| 2 | BK Kenty, Linköping | 18 | 11 | 4 | 3 | 52 | 26 | +26 | 26 | |
| 3 | Västerviks AIS | 18 | 9 | 3 | 6 | 43 | 33 | +10 | 21 | |
| 4 | IF Sylvia, Norrköping | 18 | 8 | 4 | 6 | 41 | 33 | +8 | 20 | |
| 5 | Gamleby IF | 18 | 7 | 5 | 6 | 37 | 31 | +6 | 19 | |
| 6 | Skärblacka IF | 18 | 7 | 3 | 8 | 29 | 28 | +1 | 17 | |
| 7 | Mönsterås GIF | 18 | 7 | 3 | 8 | 43 | 54 | −11 | 17 | |
| 8 | Vadstena GIF | 18 | 6 | 4 | 8 | 33 | 42 | −9 | 16 | Relegated |
| 9 | Mjölby AIF | 18 | 3 | 4 | 11 | 41 | 48 | −7 | 10 | Relegated |
| 10 | BK Hird, Norrköping | 18 | 2 | 2 | 14 | 20 | 76 | −56 | 6 | Relegated |

=== Nordvästra Götaland 1959 ===
| Pos | Team | Pld | W | D | L | GF | GA | GD | Pts | Promotion or relegation |
|---|---|---|---|---|---|---|---|---|---|---|
| 1 | Billingsfors IK | 18 | 12 | 4 | 2 | 48 | 19 | +29 | 28 | Promoted |
| 2 | Kungshamns IF | 18 | 9 | 7 | 2 | 47 | 27 | +20 | 25 | |
| 3 | IFK Åmål | 18 | 7 | 7 | 4 | 28 | 24 | +4 | 21 | |
| 4 | BK Häcken, Göteborg | 18 | 8 | 3 | 7 | 24 | 19 | +5 | 19 | |
| 5 | Utsiktens BK, Göteborg | 18 | 7 | 4 | 7 | 27 | 26 | +1 | 18 | |
| 6 | Jonsereds IF | 18 | 6 | 5 | 7 | 42 | 30 | +12 | 17 | |
| 7 | Marieholms BIK, Göteborg | 18 | 5 | 7 | 6 | 26 | 26 | 0 | 17 | |
| 8 | Lundens AIS, Göteborg | 18 | 6 | 5 | 7 | 32 | 45 | −13 | 17 | Relegated |
| 9 | IF Viken, Åmål | 18 | 5 | 1 | 12 | 29 | 55 | −26 | 11 | Relegated |
| 10 | Redbergslids IK, Göteborg | 18 | 2 | 3 | 13 | 22 | 54 | −32 | 7 | Relegated |

=== Mellersta Götaland 1959 ===
| Pos | Team | Pld | W | D | L | GF | GA | GD | Pts | Promotion or relegation |
|---|---|---|---|---|---|---|---|---|---|---|
| 1 | Tidaholms GIF | 18 | 18 | 0 | 0 | 78 | 12 | +66 | 36 | Promoted |
| 2 | Huskvarna Södra IS | 18 | 8 | 4 | 6 | 38 | 31 | +7 | 20 | |
| 3 | IFK Trollhättan | 18 | 9 | 1 | 8 | 30 | 36 | −6 | 19 | |
| 4 | Vänersborgs IF | 18 | 7 | 4 | 7 | 32 | 27 | +5 | 18 | |
| 5 | IF Heimer, Lidköping | 18 | 7 | 4 | 7 | 36 | 37 | −1 | 18 | |
| 6 | Hvetlanda GIF, Vetlanda | 18 | 8 | 2 | 8 | 34 | 42 | −8 | 18 | |
| 7 | Tranås BoIS | 18 | 7 | 3 | 8 | 36 | 35 | +1 | 17 | |
| 8 | IFK Hjo | 18 | 7 | 3 | 8 | 22 | 27 | −5 | 17 | Relegated |
| 9 | Tibro AIK | 18 | 5 | 3 | 10 | 18 | 34 | −16 | 13 | Relegated |
| 10 | Mariestads BK | 18 | 1 | 2 | 15 | 15 | 58 | −43 | 4 | Relegated |

=== Sydöstra Götaland 1959 ===
| Pos | Team | Pld | W | D | L | GF | GA | GD | Pts | Promotion or relegation |
|---|---|---|---|---|---|---|---|---|---|---|
| 1 | Perstorps SK | 18 | 12 | 4 | 2 | 51 | 20 | +31 | 28 | Promoted |
| 2 | Olofströms IF | 18 | 11 | 2 | 5 | 56 | 35 | +21 | 24 | |
| 3 | IFK Hässleholm | 18 | 11 | 0 | 7 | 40 | 34 | +6 | 22 | |
| 4 | Nybro IF | 18 | 9 | 2 | 7 | 32 | 31 | +1 | 20 | |
| 5 | Hässleholms IF | 18 | 8 | 3 | 7 | 43 | 34 | +9 | 19 | |
| 6 | Ronneby BK | 18 | 7 | 4 | 7 | 40 | 29 | +11 | 18 | |
| 7 | Saltö BK, Karlskrona | 18 | 6 | 5 | 7 | 32 | 33 | −1 | 17 | |
| 8 | Bromölla IF | 18 | 6 | 3 | 9 | 26 | 52 | −26 | 15 | Relegated |
| 9 | Kalmar AIK | 18 | 5 | 1 | 12 | 30 | 47 | −17 | 11 | Relegated |
| 10 | Alstermo IF | 18 | 2 | 2 | 14 | 20 | 75 | −55 | 6 | Relegated |

=== Sydvästra Götaland 1959 ===
| Pos | Team | Pld | W | D | L | GF | GA | GD | Pts | Promotion or relegation |
|---|---|---|---|---|---|---|---|---|---|---|
| 1 | Östers IF, Växjö | 18 | 12 | 2 | 4 | 53 | 25 | +28 | 26 | Promoted |
| 2 | Gislaveds IS | 18 | 12 | 2 | 4 | 50 | 26 | +24 | 26 | |
| 3 | Tranemo IF | 18 | 11 | 3 | 4 | 59 | 27 | +32 | 25 | |
| 4 | Viskafors IF | 18 | 9 | 4 | 5 | 44 | 36 | +8 | 22 | |
| 5 | Strömsnäsbruks IF | 18 | 7 | 5 | 6 | 35 | 38 | −3 | 19 | |
| 6 | IFK Värnamo | 18 | 8 | 0 | 10 | 38 | 47 | −9 | 16 | |
| 7 | Gnosjö IF | 18 | 6 | 3 | 9 | 31 | 47 | −16 | 15 | |
| 8 | Falkenbergs FF | 18 | 5 | 2 | 11 | 25 | 39 | −14 | 12 | Relegated |
| 9 | Morups IF | 18 | 4 | 2 | 12 | 28 | 47 | −19 | 10 | Relegated |
| 10 | Gerdskens BK, Alingsås | 18 | 4 | 1 | 13 | 22 | 53 | −31 | 9 | Relegated |

=== Södra Götaland 1959 ===
| Pos | Team | Pld | W | D | L | GF | GA | GD | Pts | Promotion or relegation |
|---|---|---|---|---|---|---|---|---|---|---|
| 1 | Gunnarstorps IF | 20 | 13 | 5 | 2 | 47 | 22 | +25 | 31 | Promoted |
| 2 | Malmö BI | 20 | 11 | 4 | 5 | 48 | 30 | +18 | 26 | |
| 3 | Åstorps IF | 20 | 9 | 5 | 6 | 41 | 31 | +10 | 23 | |
| 4 | Högaborgs BK, Helsingborg | 20 | 9 | 5 | 6 | 35 | 36 | −1 | 23 | |
| 5 | Trelleborgs FF | 20 | 9 | 3 | 8 | 36 | 35 | +1 | 21 | |
| 6 | IF Allians, Malmö | 20 | 6 | 5 | 9 | 22 | 31 | −9 | 17 | |
| 7 | IFK Ystad | 20 | 6 | 5 | 9 | 27 | 39 | −12 | 17 | |
| 8 | Lunds GIF | 20 | 5 | 7 | 8 | 28 | 41 | −13 | 17 | |
| 9 | Arlövs BoIF | 20 | 6 | 4 | 10 | 31 | 31 | 0 | 16 | Relegated |
| 10 | IFK Klagshamn | 20 | 6 | 4 | 10 | 30 | 44 | −14 | 16 | Relegated |
| 11 | IFK Trelleborg | 20 | 5 | 3 | 12 | 28 | 33 | −5 | 13 | Relegated |
