= 1970 Division 3 (Swedish football) =

Swedish League Division 3
- Season: 1970
- Champions: Bodens BK; Gimonäs CK (not promoted); Timrå IK; Kubikenborgs IF; IF Vesta; Råsunda IS; Karlstads BK; Nyköpings BIS; Skogens IF; Gnosjö IF; Blomstermåla IK; Varbergs BoIS; Gunnarstorps IF
- Promoted: 12 teams above
- Relegated: 36 teams

Statistics of Swedish football Division 3 for the 1970 season.

== League standings ==
=== Norra Norrland, Övre 1970 ===
| Pos | Team | Pld | W | D | L | GF | GA | GD | Pts | Promotion or relegation |
|---|---|---|---|---|---|---|---|---|---|---|
| 1 | Bodens BK | 18 | 12 | 4 | 2 | 46 | 16 | +30 | 28 | Promotion Playoffs – Promoted |
| 2 | Gammelstads IF | 18 | 11 | 4 | 3 | 42 | 19 | +23 | 26 | |
| 3 | Notvikens IK | 18 | 11 | 4 | 3 | 41 | 19 | +22 | 26 | |
| 4 | Luleå SK | 18 | 9 | 6 | 3 | 30 | 21 | +9 | 24 | |
| 5 | Gällivare SK | 18 | 8 | 2 | 8 | 30 | 23 | +7 | 18 | |
| 6 | Norrfjärdens IF | 18 | 6 | 5 | 7 | 26 | 27 | −1 | 17 | |
| 7 | Överkalix IF | 18 | 5 | 5 | 8 | 34 | 37 | −3 | 15 | |
| 8 | Ohtanajärvi IK | 18 | 2 | 5 | 11 | 20 | 36 | −16 | 9 | |
| 9 | IFK Kalix | 18 | 4 | 1 | 13 | 23 | 59 | −36 | 9 | Relegated |
| 10 | IFK Kiruna | 18 | 3 | 2 | 13 | 11 | 46 | −35 | 8 | Relegated |

=== Norra Norrland, Nedre 1970 ===
| Pos | Team | Pld | W | D | L | GF | GA | GD | Pts | Qualification or relegation |
|---|---|---|---|---|---|---|---|---|---|---|
| 1 | Gimonäs CK, Umeå | 18 | 13 | 3 | 2 | 46 | 13 | +33 | 29 | Promotion Playoffs |
| 2 | Norsjö IF | 18 | 12 | 1 | 5 | 44 | 22 | +22 | 25 | |
| 3 | Tegs SK | 18 | 9 | 4 | 5 | 43 | 36 | +7 | 22 | |
| 4 | Sunnanå SK | 18 | 8 | 5 | 5 | 26 | 22 | +4 | 21 | |
| 5 | Myckle IK | 18 | 7 | 2 | 9 | 21 | 30 | −9 | 16 | |
| 6 | Storfors Arbetares IK | 18 | 7 | 1 | 10 | 26 | 33 | −7 | 15 | |
| 7 | Byske IF | 18 | 6 | 3 | 9 | 32 | 41 | −9 | 15 | |
| 8 | Rönnskärs IF, Skelleftehamn | 18 | 5 | 4 | 9 | 24 | 32 | −8 | 14 | |
| 9 | Sandviks IK, Holmsund | 18 | 5 | 3 | 10 | 19 | 28 | −9 | 13 | Relegated |
| 10 | Clemensnäs IF | 18 | 5 | 0 | 13 | 21 | 45 | −24 | 10 | Relegated |

=== Södra Norrland, Övre 1970 ===
| Pos | Team | Pld | W | D | L | GF | GA | GD | Pts | Promotion or relegation |
|---|---|---|---|---|---|---|---|---|---|---|
| 1 | Timrå IK | 18 | 11 | 3 | 4 | 48 | 26 | +22 | 25 | Promotion Playoffs – Promoted |
| 2 | Hägglunds IoFK, Gullänget | 18 | 11 | 3 | 4 | 36 | 17 | +19 | 25 | |
| 3 | IF Friska Viljor, Örnsköldsvik | 18 | 11 | 3 | 4 | 33 | 16 | +17 | 25 | |
| 4 | Ope IF | 18 | 12 | 1 | 5 | 28 | 13 | +15 | 25 | |
| 5 | Frösö IF | 18 | 8 | 4 | 6 | 29 | 22 | +7 | 20 | |
| 6 | Alnö IF | 18 | 8 | 3 | 7 | 45 | 29 | +16 | 19 | |
| 7 | Husums IF | 18 | 5 | 3 | 10 | 25 | 40 | −15 | 13 | |
| 8 | MoDo AIK, Alfredshem | 18 | 5 | 2 | 11 | 16 | 32 | −16 | 12 | |
| 9 | Östby IF, Kramfors | 18 | 4 | 0 | 14 | 31 | 57 | −26 | 8 | Relegated |
| 10 | Häggenås SK | 18 | 3 | 2 | 13 | 12 | 53 | −41 | 8 | Relegated |

=== Södra Norrland, Nedre 1970 ===
| Pos | Team | Pld | W | D | L | GF | GA | GD | Pts | Promotion or relegation |
|---|---|---|---|---|---|---|---|---|---|---|
| 1 | Kubikenborgs IF, Sundsvall | 22 | 13 | 5 | 4 | 41 | 24 | +17 | 31 | Promotion Playoffs – Promoted |
| 2 | IFK Mora | 22 | 12 | 5 | 5 | 45 | 28 | +17 | 29 | |
| 3 | Sunds IF, Sundsbruk | 22 | 10 | 5 | 7 | 43 | 29 | +14 | 25 | |
| 4 | IFK Sundsvall | 22 | 10 | 5 | 7 | 43 | 35 | +8 | 25 | |
| 5 | Söderhamns IF | 22 | 11 | 3 | 8 | 28 | 33 | −5 | 25 | |
| 6 | Hudiksvalls ABK | 22 | 10 | 3 | 9 | 53 | 41 | +12 | 23 | |
| 7 | Gefle IF, Gävle | 22 | 8 | 5 | 9 | 43 | 34 | +9 | 21 | |
| 8 | Sandvikens AIK | 22 | 8 | 5 | 9 | 37 | 35 | +2 | 21 | |
| 9 | Ramsjö SK | 22 | 7 | 5 | 10 | 34 | 32 | +2 | 19 | |
| 10 | Bollnäs GIF | 22 | 7 | 3 | 12 | 27 | 42 | −15 | 17 | Relegated |
| 11 | Åshammars IK | 22 | 6 | 5 | 11 | 33 | 57 | −24 | 17 | Relegated |
| 12 | IFK Bergvik | 22 | 4 | 3 | 15 | 25 | 62 | −37 | 11 | Relegated |

=== Norra Svealand 1970 ===
| Pos | Team | Pld | W | D | L | GF | GA | GD | Pts | Promotion or relegation |
|---|---|---|---|---|---|---|---|---|---|---|
| 1 | IF Vesta, Uppsala | 22 | 18 | 3 | 1 | 56 | 20 | +36 | 39 | Promoted |
| 2 | Västerås SK | 22 | 16 | 4 | 2 | 74 | 16 | +58 | 36 | |
| 3 | Upsala IF, Uppsala | 22 | 11 | 7 | 4 | 39 | 19 | +20 | 29 | |
| 4 | IFK Västerås | 22 | 12 | 2 | 8 | 46 | 29 | +17 | 26 | |
| 5 | Avesta AIK | 22 | 11 | 4 | 7 | 46 | 31 | +15 | 26 | |
| 6 | Krylbo IF | 22 | 9 | 4 | 9 | 29 | 32 | −3 | 22 | |
| 7 | Norbergs AIF | 22 | 5 | 10 | 7 | 32 | 42 | −10 | 20 | |
| 8 | Enköpings SK | 22 | 7 | 5 | 10 | 25 | 41 | −16 | 19 | |
| 9 | Hofors AIF | 22 | 5 | 7 | 10 | 27 | 34 | −7 | 17 | |
| 10 | Västerås IK | 22 | 3 | 8 | 11 | 23 | 49 | −26 | 14 | Relegated |
| 11 | Gamla Upsala IF, Uppsala | 22 | 5 | 3 | 14 | 24 | 51 | −27 | 13 | Relegated |
| 12 | Fagersta AIK | 22 | 2 | 1 | 19 | 15 | 72 | −57 | 5 | Relegated |

=== Östra Svealand 1970 ===
| Pos | Team | Pld | W | D | L | GF | GA | GD | Pts | Promotion or relegation |
|---|---|---|---|---|---|---|---|---|---|---|
| 1 | Råsunda IS, Solna | 22 | 14 | 4 | 4 | 46 | 20 | +26 | 32 | Promoted |
| 2 | Flens IF | 22 | 14 | 3 | 5 | 52 | 23 | +29 | 31 | |
| 3 | Edsbro IF | 22 | 11 | 6 | 5 | 40 | 31 | +9 | 28 | |
| 4 | Väsby IK, Upplands-Väsby | 22 | 10 | 6 | 6 | 40 | 32 | +8 | 26 | |
| 5 | Sundbybergs IK | 22 | 9 | 3 | 10 | 36 | 31 | +5 | 21 | |
| 6 | Stockholms IF | 22 | 6 | 9 | 7 | 36 | 36 | 0 | 21 | |
| 7 | Malmköpings IF | 22 | 8 | 5 | 9 | 39 | 45 | −6 | 21 | |
| 8 | Visby IF Gute | 22 | 7 | 6 | 9 | 44 | 39 | +5 | 20 | |
| 9 | Nynäshamns IF | 22 | 8 | 4 | 10 | 37 | 49 | −12 | 20 | |
| 10 | Huddinge IF | 22 | 6 | 6 | 10 | 33 | 37 | −4 | 18 | Relegated |
| 11 | Hallsta IK, Hallstavik | 22 | 6 | 4 | 12 | 35 | 45 | −10 | 16 | Relegated |
| 12 | Rimbo IF | 22 | 3 | 2 | 17 | 25 | 75 | −50 | 8 | Relegated |

=== Västra Svealand 1970 ===
| Pos | Team | Pld | W | D | L | GF | GA | GD | Pts | Promotion or relegation |
|---|---|---|---|---|---|---|---|---|---|---|
| 1 | Karlstads BK | 22 | 18 | 0 | 4 | 66 | 19 | +47 | 36 | Promoted |
| 2 | Melleruds IF | 22 | 13 | 4 | 5 | 51 | 31 | +20 | 30 | |
| 3 | IFK Kristinehamn | 22 | 10 | 9 | 3 | 35 | 23 | +12 | 29 | |
| 4 | IF Viken, Åmål | 22 | 10 | 5 | 7 | 42 | 42 | 0 | 25 | |
| 5 | Bengtsfors IF | 22 | 10 | 3 | 9 | 38 | 41 | −3 | 23 | |
| 6 | IFK Sunne | 22 | 9 | 4 | 9 | 44 | 30 | +14 | 22 | |
| 7 | BK Forward, Örebro | 22 | 8 | 6 | 8 | 44 | 40 | +4 | 22 | |
| 8 | SK Sifhälla, Säffle | 22 | 9 | 4 | 9 | 29 | 31 | −2 | 22 | |
| 9 | Deje IK | 22 | 7 | 7 | 8 | 39 | 44 | −5 | 21 | |
| 10 | Karlslunds IF, Örebro | 22 | 5 | 4 | 13 | 35 | 45 | −10 | 14 | Relegated |
| 11 | Rynninge IK, Örebro | 22 | 4 | 5 | 13 | 25 | 61 | −36 | 13 | Relegated |
| 12 | Arboga Sdra IF | 22 | 3 | 1 | 18 | 29 | 70 | −41 | 7 | Relegated |

=== Nordöstra Götaland 1970 ===
| Pos | Team | Pld | W | D | L | GF | GA | GD | Pts | Promotion or relegation |
|---|---|---|---|---|---|---|---|---|---|---|
| 1 | Nyköpings BIS | 22 | 17 | 1 | 4 | 57 | 16 | +41 | 35 | Promoted |
| 2 | BK Derby, Linköping | 22 | 14 | 4 | 4 | 33 | 16 | +17 | 32 | |
| 3 | Finspångs AIK | 22 | 13 | 5 | 4 | 52 | 21 | +31 | 31 | |
| 4 | Tranås BoIS | 22 | 9 | 6 | 7 | 33 | 31 | +2 | 24 | |
| 5 | Huskvarna Södra IS | 22 | 9 | 5 | 8 | 27 | 28 | −1 | 23 | |
| 6 | Motala AIF | 22 | 9 | 5 | 8 | 36 | 40 | −4 | 23 | |
| 7 | Skärblacka IF | 22 | 9 | 4 | 9 | 37 | 39 | −2 | 22 | |
| 8 | BK Kenty, Linköping | 22 | 6 | 5 | 11 | 31 | 29 | +2 | 17 | |
| 9 | IFK Vreta Kloster | 22 | 7 | 3 | 12 | 28 | 46 | −18 | 17 | |
| 10 | IF Hallby, Jönköping | 22 | 4 | 7 | 11 | 27 | 48 | −21 | 15 | Relegated |
| 11 | Borens IK, Motala | 22 | 4 | 5 | 13 | 16 | 40 | −24 | 13 | Relegated |
| 12 | Smedby AIS, Norrköping | 22 | 3 | 6 | 13 | 33 | 56 | −23 | 12 | Relegated |

=== Nordvästra Götaland 1970 ===
| Pos | Team | Pld | W | D | L | GF | GA | GD | Pts | Promotion or relegation |
|---|---|---|---|---|---|---|---|---|---|---|
| 1 | Skogens IF, Göteborg | 22 | 14 | 5 | 3 | 50 | 25 | +25 | 33 | Promoted |
| 2 | Göteborgs AIK | 22 | 13 | 4 | 5 | 51 | 25 | +26 | 30 | |
| 3 | Trollhättans IF | 22 | 14 | 2 | 6 | 47 | 25 | +22 | 30 | |
| 4 | IK Oddevold, Uddevalla | 22 | 11 | 5 | 6 | 50 | 28 | +22 | 27 | |
| 5 | Götene IF | 22 | 9 | 6 | 7 | 42 | 41 | +1 | 24 | |
| 6 | Tibro AIK | 22 | 8 | 8 | 6 | 33 | 26 | +7 | 24 | |
| 7 | Kungshamns IF | 22 | 9 | 5 | 8 | 41 | 37 | +4 | 23 | |
| 8 | IF Heimer, Lidköping | 22 | 7 | 6 | 9 | 39 | 44 | −5 | 20 | |
| 9 | Backa IF | 22 | 7 | 3 | 12 | 46 | 52 | −6 | 17 | |
| 10 | IK Kongahälla, Kunglv | 22 | 6 | 3 | 13 | 42 | 58 | −16 | 15 | Relegated |
| 11 | Skara IF | 22 | 5 | 5 | 12 | 28 | 55 | −27 | 15 | Relegated |
| 12 | Arentorps SK | 22 | 2 | 2 | 18 | 18 | 80 | −62 | 6 | Relegated |

=== Mellersta Götaland 1970 ===
| Pos | Team | Pld | W | D | L | GF | GA | GD | Pts | Promotion or relegation |
|---|---|---|---|---|---|---|---|---|---|---|
| 1 | Gnosjö IF | 22 | 15 | 3 | 4 | 39 | 19 | +20 | 33 | Promoted |
| 2 | Kristianstads BI | 22 | 12 | 4 | 6 | 36 | 27 | +9 | 28 | |
| 3 | Vilans BoIF, Kristianstad | 22 | 11 | 5 | 6 | 33 | 24 | +9 | 27 | |
| 4 | Växjö BK | 22 | 10 | 3 | 9 | 32 | 30 | +2 | 23 | |
| 5 | IFK Kristianstad | 22 | 9 | 3 | 10 | 45 | 37 | +8 | 21 | |
| 6 | IS Örnia, Halmstad | 22 | 9 | 3 | 10 | 45 | 38 | +7 | 21 | |
| 7 | Ovesholms IF | 22 | 9 | 3 | 10 | 34 | 35 | −1 | 21 | |
| 8 | Liatorps IF | 22 | 9 | 3 | 10 | 34 | 39 | −5 | 21 | |
| 9 | Markaryds IF | 22 | 9 | 3 | 10 | 28 | 33 | −5 | 21 | |
| 10 | Smålandsstenars GIF | 22 | 8 | 5 | 9 | 38 | 45 | −7 | 21 | Relegated |
| 11 | Getinge IF | 22 | 6 | 5 | 11 | 22 | 35 | −13 | 17 | Relegated |
| 12 | IFK Osby | 22 | 3 | 4 | 15 | 17 | 41 | −24 | 10 | Relegated |

=== Sydöstra Götaland 1970 ===
| Pos | Team | Pld | W | D | L | GF | GA | GD | Pts | Promotion or relegation |
|---|---|---|---|---|---|---|---|---|---|---|
| 1 | Blomstermåla IK | 22 | 13 | 6 | 3 | 60 | 25 | +35 | 32 | Promoted |
| 2 | Emmaboda IS | 22 | 12 | 6 | 4 | 48 | 19 | +29 | 30 | |
| 3 | Myresjö IF | 22 | 12 | 4 | 6 | 37 | 26 | +11 | 28 | |
| 4 | Sölvesborgs GIF | 22 | 13 | 0 | 9 | 51 | 25 | +26 | 26 | |
| 5 | Lyckeby GIF | 22 | 11 | 4 | 7 | 44 | 29 | +15 | 26 | |
| 6 | Högadals IS, Karlshamn | 22 | 10 | 4 | 8 | 40 | 29 | +11 | 24 | |
| 7 | Jämshögs IF | 22 | 9 | 6 | 7 | 23 | 35 | −12 | 24 | |
| 8 | IFK Oskarshamn | 22 | 10 | 3 | 9 | 49 | 41 | +8 | 23 | |
| 9 | Hvetlanda GIF, Vetlanda | 22 | 7 | 6 | 9 | 28 | 36 | −8 | 20 | |
| 10 | Vimmerby IF | 22 | 6 | 6 | 10 | 30 | 39 | −9 | 18 | Relegated |
| 11 | Norrhults BK | 22 | 3 | 2 | 17 | 17 | 79 | −62 | 8 | Relegated |
| 12 | Nässjö IF | 22 | 2 | 1 | 19 | 24 | 68 | −44 | 5 | Relegated |

=== Sydvästra Götaland 1970 ===
| Pos | Team | Pld | W | D | L | GF | GA | GD | Pts | Promotion or relegation |
|---|---|---|---|---|---|---|---|---|---|---|
| 1 | Varbergs BoIS | 22 | 15 | 3 | 4 | 43 | 18 | +25 | 33 | Promoted |
| 2 | IFK Ulricehamn | 22 | 12 | 5 | 5 | 51 | 24 | +27 | 29 | |
| 3 | Kungsbacka BI | 22 | 10 | 7 | 5 | 34 | 25 | +9 | 27 | |
| 4 | Kullens BK, Göteborg | 22 | 9 | 7 | 6 | 29 | 22 | +7 | 25 | |
| 5 | IFK Falköping | 22 | 9 | 3 | 10 | 31 | 26 | +5 | 21 | |
| 6 | Alingsås IF | 22 | 8 | 5 | 9 | 24 | 33 | −9 | 21 | |
| 7 | Kinna IF | 22 | 6 | 8 | 8 | 33 | 32 | +1 | 20 | |
| 8 | Skene IF | 22 | 8 | 4 | 10 | 26 | 31 | −5 | 20 | |
| 9 | IFK Örby, Kinna | 22 | 8 | 3 | 11 | 25 | 30 | −5 | 19 | |
| 10 | IF Stendy, Göteborg | 22 | 8 | 3 | 11 | 27 | 44 | −17 | 19 | Relegated |
| 11 | BK Qviding, Göteborg | 22 | 5 | 5 | 12 | 20 | 36 | −16 | 15 | Relegated |
| 12 | Fässbergs IF, Mölndal | 22 | 6 | 3 | 13 | 20 | 42 | −22 | 15 | Relegated |

=== Skåne 1970 ===
| Pos | Team | Pld | W | D | L | GF | GA | GD | Pts | Promotion or relegation |
|---|---|---|---|---|---|---|---|---|---|---|
| 1 | Gunnarstorps IF | 22 | 16 | 4 | 2 | 54 | 24 | +30 | 36 | Promoted |
| 2 | Höganäs BK | 22 | 15 | 5 | 2 | 56 | 22 | +34 | 35 | |
| 3 | Trelleborgs FF | 22 | 11 | 5 | 6 | 46 | 27 | +19 | 27 | |
| 4 | Furulunds IK | 22 | 10 | 5 | 7 | 40 | 34 | +6 | 25 | |
| 5 | Limhamns IF | 22 | 9 | 3 | 10 | 49 | 54 | −5 | 21 | |
| 6 | Lunds BK | 22 | 7 | 6 | 9 | 37 | 30 | +7 | 20 | |
| 7 | Borstahusens BK, Landskrona | 22 | 9 | 2 | 11 | 35 | 34 | +1 | 20 | |
| 8 | Anderslövs BIK | 22 | 7 | 6 | 9 | 20 | 31 | −11 | 20 | |
| 9 | Arlövs BI | 22 | 8 | 4 | 10 | 32 | 48 | −16 | 20 | |
| 10 | GIF Nike, Lomma | 22 | 6 | 7 | 9 | 24 | 39 | −15 | 19 | Relegated |
| 11 | Åstorps IF | 22 | 3 | 6 | 13 | 29 | 44 | −15 | 12 | Relegated |
| 12 | Malmö BI | 22 | 4 | 1 | 17 | 23 | 58 | −35 | 9 | Relegated |
