= 1955–56 Division 3 (Swedish football) =

Swedish League Division 3
- Season: 1955–56
- Champions: IFK Luleå; IF Friska Viljor; Gefle IF; Avesta AIK; Katrineholms SK; IFK Bofors; BK Kenty; Fässbergs IF; IFK Trollhättan; IFK Kristianstad; IS Halmia; Gunnarstorps IF
- Promoted: 12 teams above
- Relegated: 29 teams

Statistics of Swedish football Division 3 for the 1955–56 season.

== League standings ==
=== Norra Norrland 1955–56 ===
Pos	Team	Pld	W	D	L	GF	GA	GD	Pts	Promotion or relegation
1	IFK Luleå	18	15	1	2	69	18	+51	31	Promoted
2	Skellefteå IF	18	11	0	7	68	29	+39	22	
3	Luleå SK	18	8	5	5	43	32	+11	21	
4	Rosviks IK	18	8	3	7	42	47	−5	19	
5	Sunnanå SK	18	8	2	8	41	44	−3	18	
6	Kiruna AIF	18	6	5	7	35	35	0	17	
7	Medle SK	18	7	2	9	61	62	−1	16	
8	IFK Kalix	18	5	5	8	30	47	−17	15	
9	Piteå IF	18	5	2	11	32	62	−30	12	Relegated
10	Hornskrokens IF	18	3	3	12	40	85	−45	9	Relegated

=== Mellersta Norrland 1955–56 ===
Pos	Team	Pld	W	D	L	GF	GA	GD	Pts	Promotion or relegation
1	IF Friska Viljor, Örnsköldsvik	22	17	2	3	60	30	+30	36	Promoted
2	Sandviks IK	22	13	5	4	67	28	+39	31	
3	IF Älgarna, Härnösand	22	14	3	5	81	44	+37	31	
4	Domsjö IF	22	9	7	6	55	44	+11	25	
5	Köpmanholmens IF	22	11	2	9	48	45	+3	24	
6	Kramfors IF	22	10	3	9	55	50	+5	23	
7	Frånö SK	22	9	3	10	51	58	−7	21	
8	Husums IF	22	8	4	10	58	49	+9	20	
9	Bollsta IK	22	8	3	11	44	57	−13	19	Relegated
10	Alfredshems IK	22	5	5	12	38	54	−16	15	Relegated
11	Ope IF	22	3	4	15	23	59	−36	10	Relegated
12	Ytterån-Waplans SK	22	3	3	16	29	91	−62	9	Relegated

=== Södra Norrland 1955–56 ===
Pos	Team	Pld	W	D	L	GF	GA	GD	Pts	Promotion or relegation
1	Gefle IF, Gävle	20	16	2	2	73	28	+45	34	Promoted
2	Skutskärs IF	20	9	8	3	44	29	+15	26	
3	Marma IF	20	10	4	6	44	41	+3	24	
4	Delsbo IF	20	9	5	6	49	35	+14	23	
5	Ljusdals IF	20	9	5	6	55	49	+6	23	
6	Kubikenborgs IF	20	6	6	8	47	49	−2	18	
7	Wifsta/Östrands IF	20	6	6	8	38	47	−9	18	
8	Hofors AIF	20	6	5	9	38	39	−1	17	
9	Högbo AIK	20	5	6	9	26	40	−14	16	Relegated
10	Söderhamns IF	20	4	3	13	28	49	−21	11	Relegated
11	Matfors IF	20	3	4	13	26	62	−36	10	Relegated

=== Norra Svealand 1955–56 ===
Pos	Team	Pld	W	D	L	GF	GA	GD	Pts	Promotion or relegation
1	Avesta AIK	20	11	3	6	49	28	+21	25	Promoted
2	IF Vesta, Uppsala	20	11	3	6	52	39	+13	25	
3	IFK Grängesberg	20	11	0	9	50	32	+18	22	
4	IF Rune, Kungsör	20	9	4	7	34	38	−4	22	
5	Ludvika FFI	20	7	7	6	52	39	+13	21	
6	Västerås IK	20	8	4	8	38	33	+5	20	
7	Hallstahammars SK	20	9	2	9	45	45	0	20	
8	Leksands IF	20	9	2	9	42	47	−5	20	
9	Rimbo IF	20	8	2	10	40	39	+1	18	Relegated
10	Edsbro IF	20	5	8	7	40	50	−10	18	Relegated
11	Islingby IK	20	4	1	15	34	86	−52	9	Relegated

=== Östra Svealand 1955–56 ===
Pos	Team	Pld	W	D	L	GF	GA	GD	Pts	Promotion or relegation
1	Katrineholms SK	18	12	2	4	58	26	+32	26	Promoted
2	Hagalunds IS, Solna	18	12	0	6	44	26	+18	24	
3	IK Sture, Stockholm	18	11	2	5	44	34	+10	24	
4	Södertälje SK	18	9	4	5	54	36	+18	22	
5	Hargs Fabrikers IF, Harg	18	9	3	6	47	37	+10	21	
6	Sundbybergs IK	18	8	3	7	32	33	−1	19	
7	Vasalunds IF, Solna	18	6	4	8	27	32	−5	16	
8	Gröndals IK	18	5	3	10	30	48	−18	13	
9	Reymersholms IK, Stockholm	18	4	1	13	24	54	−30	9	Relegated
10	Katrineholms AIK	18	2	2	14	19	53	−34	6	Relegated

=== Västra Svealand 1955–56 ===
Pos	Team	Pld	W	D	L	GF	GA	GD	Pts	Promotion or relegation
1	IFK Bofors	18	13	2	3	56	24	+32	28	Promoted
2	IK Viking, Hagfors	18	10	5	3	39	22	+17	25	
3	Karlslunds IF, Örebro	18	9	6	3	30	22	+8	24	
4	Karlstads FF	18	10	2	6	51	40	+11	22	
5	IFK Kumla	18	8	4	6	28	29	−1	20	
6	Rynninge IK, Örebro	18	6	4	8	31	30	+1	16	
7	Arvika BK	18	5	6	7	30	29	+1	16	
8	Slottsbrons IF	18	4	5	9	27	41	−14	13	Relegated
9	IFK Kristinehamn	18	4	4	10	22	42	−20	12	Relegated
10	Laxå IF	18	1	2	15	21	56	−35	4	Relegated

=== Nordöstra Götaland 1955–56 ===
Pos	Team	Pld	W	D	L	GF	GA	GD	Pts	Promotion or relegation
1	BK Kenty, Linköping	18	14	3	1	58	18	+40	31	Promoted
2	Finspångs AIK	18	10	5	3	39	22	+17	25	
3	IF Sylvia, Norrköping	18	9	2	7	40	29	+11	20	
4	IFK Västervik	18	7	6	5	37	30	+7	20	
5	Oskarshamns AIK	18	7	5	6	40	39	+1	19	
6	Mjölby AIF	18	7	4	7	32	37	−5	18	
7	Gottfridsbergs IF, Linköping	18	9	0	9	32	41	−9	18	
8	BK Calmia, Norrköping	18	4	3	11	18	41	−23	11	
9	IFK Oskarshamn	18	2	6	10	19	42	−23	10	Relegated
10	Åby IF	18	2	4	12	24	40	−16	8	Relegated

=== Nordvästra Götaland 1955–56 ===
Pos	Team	Pld	W	D	L	GF	GA	GD	Pts	Promotion or relegation
1	Fässbergs IF, Mölndal	18	14	2	2	59	20	+39	30	Promoted
2	IK Oddevold, Uddevalla	18	13	2	3	53	20	+33	28	Promoted
3	Billingsfors IK	18	8	4	6	38	30	+8	20	
4	Redbergslids IK, Göteborg	18	7	6	5	32	25	+7	20	
5	Göteborgs FF	18	7	3	8	37	36	+1	17	
6	IK Virgo, Göteborg	18	6	5	7	25	38	−13	17	
7	Skogens IF, Göteborg	18	5	6	7	27	39	−12	16	
8	IF Viken, Åmål	18	4	4	10	34	49	−15	12	
9	Sävedalens IF	18	3	5	10	15	38	−23	11	Relegated
10	IFK Åmål	18	2	5	11	24	49	−25	9	Relegated

=== Mellersta Götaland 1955–56 ===
Pos	Team	Pld	W	D	L	GF	GA	GD	Pts	Promotion or relegation
1	IFK Trollhättan	18	11	4	3	50	30	+20	26	Promoted
2	Skara IF	18	11	3	4	43	30	+13	25	Promoted
3	Trollhättans IF	18	8	6	4	43	30	+13	22	
4	Tidaholms GIF	18	8	5	5	37	29	+8	21	
5	IFK Tidaholm	18	8	3	7	33	31	+2	19	
6	Huskvarna Södra IS	18	6	4	8	36	34	+2	16	
7	Vänersborgs IF	18	5	6	7	34	35	−1	16	
8	IFK Falköping	18	5	3	10	41	58	−17	13	
9	Tibro AIK	18	4	4	10	13	31	−18	12	
10	Lidköpings BK	18	2	6	10	28	50	−22	10	Relegated

=== Sydöstra Götaland 1955–56 ===
Pos	Team	Pld	W	D	L	GF	GA	GD	Pts	Promotion or relegation
1	IFK Kristianstad	18	15	1	2	64	19	+45	31	Promoted
2	Högadals IS	18	12	1	5	45	21	+24	25	
3	Kalmar AIK	18	12	0	6	40	23	+17	24	
4	Olofströms IF	18	9	3	6	33	28	+5	21	
5	Hässleholms IF	18	7	3	8	30	33	−3	17	
6	Bromölla IF	18	5	5	8	25	31	−6	15	
7	Mjällby AIF	18	5	5	8	24	38	−14	15	
8	Norrhults BK	18	5	4	9	17	41	−24	14	
9	Sölvesborgs GIF	18	4	3	11	22	34	−12	11	Relegated
10	Ronneby BK	18	2	3	13	22	54	−32	7	Relegated

=== Sydvästra Götaland 1955–56 ===
Pos	Team	Pld	W	D	L	GF	GA	GD	Pts	Promotion or relegation
1	IS Halmia, Halmstad	18	13	3	2	53	19	+34	29	Promoted
2	Gnosjö IF	18	7	6	5	38	31	+7	20	
3	IFK Värnamo	18	8	4	6	31	36	−5	20	
4	Växjö BK	18	7	5	6	47	42	+5	19	
5	Falkenbergs FF	18	7	4	7	38	31	+7	18	
6	Limmareds IF	18	7	4	7	44	43	+1	18	
7	Mariedals IK	18	6	4	8	25	22	+3	16	
8	Östers IF, Växjö	18	6	4	8	36	46	−10	16	
9	Rydaholms GIF	18	5	2	11	30	48	−18	12	Relegated
10	Hyltebruks IF	18	4	4	10	22	46	−24	12	Relegated

=== Södra Götaland 1955–56 ===
Pos	Team	Pld	W	D	L	GF	GA	GD	Pts	Promotion or relegation
1	Gunnarstorps IF	18	13	3	2	50	28	+22	29	Promoted
2	Lunds BK	18	9	5	4	29	22	+7	23	
3	Billesholms GIF	18	9	3	6	36	27	+9	21	
4	Malmö BI	18	7	4	7	39	31	+8	18	
5	IFK Ystad	18	8	1	9	45	40	+5	17	
6	IF Allians, Malmö	18	7	3	8	25	33	−8	17	
7	BK Fram, Landskrona	18	5	5	8	34	37	−3	15	
8	Eslövs IK	18	6	3	9	34	45	−11	15	Relegated
9	Ängelholms IF	18	7	0	11	25	34	−9	14	Relegated
10	Eskilsminne IF, Hälsingborg	18	4	3	11	25	45	−20	11	Relegated
