= 1956–57 Division 3 (Swedish football) =

Swedish League Division 3
- Season: 1956–57
- Champions: Skellefteå IF; IFK Östersund; Marma IF; Hallstahammars SK; Vasalunds IF; SK Sifhälla; IF Saab; Jonsereds IF; Tidaholms GIF; Kalmar AIK; Tranemo IF; IF Allians
- Promoted: 12 teams above
- Relegated: 36 teams

Statistics of Swedish football Division 3 for the 1956–57 season.

== League standings ==
=== Norra Norrland 1956–57 ===
Pos	Team	Pld	W	D	L	GF	GA	GD	Pts	Promotion or relegation
1	Skellefteå IF	18	12	2	4	48	19	+29	26	Promoted
2	Sunnanå SK	18	9	4	5	39	33	+6	22	
3	Luleå SK	18	7	6	5	42	36	+6	20	
4	Medle SK	18	7	5	6	41	41	0	19	
5	Kiruna AIF	18	6	4	8	40	36	+4	16	
6	Rosviks IK	18	7	2	9	33	38	−5	16	
7	Rönnskärs IF, Skelleftehamn	18	6	4	8	26	34	−8	16	
8	Malmbergets AIF	18	8	0	10	40	53	−13	16	Relegated
9	Vittjärvs IK	18	7	1	10	22	30	−8	15	Relegated
10	IFK Kalix	18	6	2	10	46	48	−2	14	Relegated

=== Mellersta Norrland 1956–57 ===
Pos	Team	Pld	W	D	L	GF	GA	GD	Pts	Promotion or relegation
1	IFK Östersund	22	20	2	0	97	29	+68	42	Promoted
2	IF Älgarna, Härnösand	22	15	3	4	60	22	+38	33	
3	Sollefteå GIF	22	12	4	6	71	53	+18	28	
4	Husums IF	22	10	6	6	61	50	+11	26	
5	Sandviks IK	22	12	2	8	51	41	+10	26	
6	Sandåkerns SK	22	11	2	9	57	38	+19	24	
7	Domsjö IF	22	9	3	10	44	53	−9	21	
8	Köpmanholmens IF	22	7	5	10	32	44	−12	19	
9	Kramfors IF	22	6	6	10	38	52	−14	18	
10	Frånö SK	22	5	4	13	41	64	−23	14	Relegated
11	Ådalslidens SK	22	3	2	17	31	74	−43	8	Relegated
12	Krokom-Dvärsätts IF	22	2	1	19	24	87	−63	5	Relegated

=== Södra Norrland 1956–57 ===
Pos	Team	Pld	W	D	L	GF	GA	GD	Pts	Promotion or relegation
1	Marma IF	20	14	2	4	50	24	+26	30	Promoted
2	Wifsta/Östrands IF	20	11	5	4	51	37	+14	27	
3	Ljusdals IF	20	10	3	7	56	40	+16	23	
4	Sandvikens AIK	20	9	4	7	44	36	+8	22	
5	Hofors AIF	20	10	2	8	50	50	0	22	
6	Ljunga IF	20	8	5	7	59	54	+5	21	
7	Skutskärs IF	20	6	6	8	40	39	+1	18	
8	Kubikenborgs IF	20	8	2	10	37	39	−2	18	
9	Brynäs IF, Gävle	20	7	4	9	38	45	−7	18	Relegated
10	Bollnäs GIF	20	4	3	13	33	67	−34	11	Relegated
11	Delsbo IF	20	4	2	14	39	66	−27	10	Relegated

=== Norra Svealand 1956–57 ===
Pos	Team	Pld	W	D	L	GF	GA	GD	Pts	Promotion or relegation
1	Hallstahammars SK	18	13	1	4	54	22	+32	27	Promoted
2	Ludvika FFI	18	10	4	4	38	24	+14	24	
3	Säters IF	18	9	3	6	36	27	+9	21	
4	IFK Grängesberg	18	8	4	6	36	23	+13	20	
5	IFK Västerås	18	9	1	8	40	35	+5	19	
6	IF Vesta, Uppsala	18	7	5	6	37	38	−1	19	
7	Västerås IK	18	9	1	8	34	35	−1	19	
8	BK Vargarna, Norrtälje	18	9	1	8	31	32	−1	19	Relegated
9	IF Rune, Kungsör	18	2	4	12	22	39	−17	8	Relegated
10	Leksands IF	18	1	2	15	20	73	−53	4	Relegated

=== Östra Svealand 1956–57 ===
Pos	Team	Pld	W	D	L	GF	GA	GD	Pts	Promotion or relegation
1	Vasalunds IF, Solna	18	11	4	3	55	27	+28	26	Promoted
2	Hagalunds IS, Solna	18	12	2	4	47	24	+23	26	
3	Södertälje SK	18	8	6	4	43	28	+15	22	
4	IK Sture, Stockholm	18	9	1	8	48	41	+7	19	
5	Älvsjö AIK	18	8	2	8	31	41	−10	18	
6	Sundbybergs IK	18	6	3	9	26	35	−9	15	
7	Ängby IF	18	6	3	9	30	53	−23	15	
8	Hargs Fabrikers IF	18	5	4	9	37	37	0	14	Relegated
9	Östermalms IS, Eskilstuna	18	5	3	10	29	43	−14	13	Relegated
10	Gröndals IK	18	6	0	12	30	47	−17	12	Relegated

=== Västra Svealand 1956–57 ===
Pos	Team	Pld	W	D	L	GF	GA	GD	Pts	Promotion or relegation
1	SK Sifhälla, Säffle	20	15	1	4	54	13	+41	31	Promoted
2	Karlslunds IF, Örebro	20	11	6	3	37	23	+14	28	
3	BK Forward, Örebro	20	11	3	6	49	33	+16	25	
4	Hällefors AIF	20	11	1	8	51	38	+13	23	
5	Arvika BK	20	9	4	7	32	29	+3	22	
6	Karlstads FF	20	8	3	9	39	48	−9	19	
7	IFK Kumla	20	6	6	8	33	32	+1	18	
8	Karlskoga IF	20	8	2	10	41	44	−3	18	
9	IK Viking, Hagfors	20	5	4	11	27	47	−20	14	Relegated
10	Rynninge IK, Örebro	20	5	3	12	25	44	−19	13	Relegated
11	Arvika FF	20	4	1	15	28	64	−36	9	Relegated

=== Nordöstra Götaland 1956–57 ===
Pos	Team	Pld	W	D	L	GF	GA	GD	Pts	Promotion or relegation
1	IF Saab, Linköping	18	10	4	4	36	25	+11	24	Promoted
2	IFK Västervik	18	9	5	4	40	18	+22	23	
3	IF Sylvia, Norrköping	18	11	0	7	42	48	−6	22	
4	Skärblacka IF	18	9	3	6	46	33	+13	21	
5	Gottfridsbergs IF, Linköping	18	9	3	6	42	38	+4	21	
6	Finspångs AIK	18	6	4	8	24	31	−7	16	
7	Gamleby IF	18	5	5	8	38	41	−3	15	
8	Mjölby AIF	18	6	3	9	34	43	−9	15	Relegated
9	BK Calmia, Norrköping	18	3	8	7	26	33	−7	14	Relegated
10	Oskarshamns AIK	18	3	3	12	25	43	−18	9	Relegated

=== Nordvästra Götaland 1956–57 ===
Pos	Team	Pld	W	D	L	GF	GA	GD	Pts	Promotion or relegation
1	Jonsereds IF	18	14	1	3	63	28	+35	29	Promoted
2	BK Häcken, Göteborg	18	10	3	5	38	26	+12	23	
3	Billingsfors IK	18	9	5	4	37	26	+11	23	
4	Redbergslids IK, Göteborg	18	9	4	5	45	33	+12	22	
5	IF Viken, Åmål	18	7	4	7	27	31	−4	18	
6	Göteborgs FF	18	7	3	8	27	35	−8	17	
7	Vidkärrs IF	18	4	5	9	27	38	−11	13	
8	Skogens IF, Göteborg	18	5	3	10	28	47	−19	13	Relegated
9	IK Virgo, Göteborg	18	4	4	10	18	34	−16	12	Relegated
10	Håfreströms IF	18	4	2	12	26	38	−12	10	Relegated

=== Mellersta Götaland 1956–57 ===
Pos	Team	Pld	W	D	L	GF	GA	GD	Pts	Promotion or relegation
1	Tidaholms GIF	18	14	1	3	51	16	+35	29	Promoted
2	Hvetlanda GIF, Vetlanda	18	14	1	3	51	27	+24	29	
3	Huskvarna Södra IS	18	9	2	7	43	32	+11	20	
4	Tibro AIK	18	8	4	6	21	17	+4	20	
5	Trollhättans IF	18	8	3	7	34	28	+6	19	
6	IFK Tidaholm	18	7	2	9	36	43	−7	16	
7	Ulricehamns IF	18	6	3	9	23	37	−14	15	
8	Vänersborgs IF	18	5	4	9	31	44	−13	14	Relegated
9	IFK Falköping	18	5	2	11	25	37	−12	12	Relegated
10	Sjuntorps IF	18	2	2	14	21	55	−34	6	Relegated

=== Sydöstra Götaland 1956–57 ===
Pos	Team	Pld	W	D	L	GF	GA	GD	Pts	Promotion or relegation
1	Kalmar AIK	18	11	4	3	45	25	+20	26	Promoted
2	Högadals IS	18	10	4	4	41	24	+17	24	
3	IFK Osby	18	8	4	6	49	27	+22	20	
4	Bromölla IF	18	6	8	4	23	20	+3	20	
5	Olofströms IF	18	8	3	7	41	33	+8	19	
6	Hässleholms IF	18	8	2	8	24	31	−7	18	
7	Mjällby AIF	18	6	3	9	34	40	−6	15	
8	Ljungbyholms GoIF	18	5	5	8	22	39	−17	15	Relegated
9	Svängsta IF	18	5	3	10	33	46	−13	13	Relegated
10	Norrhults BK	18	4	2	12	22	49	−27	10	Relegated

=== Sydvästra Götaland 1956–57 ===
Pos	Team	Pld	W	D	L	GF	GA	GD	Pts	Promotion or relegation
1	Tranemo IF	18	13	2	3	41	18	+23	28	Promoted
2	Östers IF, VäxjÖ	18	10	4	4	36	32	+4	24	
3	Gislaveds IS	18	9	2	7	35	30	+5	20	
4	Falkenbergs FF	18	9	2	7	30	30	0	20	
5	IFK Värnamo	18	8	3	7	37	32	+5	19	
6	Mariedals IK	18	6	7	5	25	25	0	19	
7	Gnosjö IF	18	7	3	8	29	25	+4	17	
8	Varbergs GIF	18	8	1	9	36	41	−5	17	Relegated
9	Växjö BK	18	4	2	12	33	42	−9	10	Relegated
10	Limmareds IF	18	1	4	13	23	50	−27	6	Relegated

=== Södra Götaland 1956–57 ===
Pos	Team	Pld	W	D	L	GF	GA	GD	Pts	Promotion or relegation
1	IF Allians, Malmö	20	15	3	2	49	24	+25	33	Promoted
2	IFK Ystad	20	12	3	5	56	37	+19	27	
3	Billesholms GIF	20	11	4	5	50	34	+16	26	
4	Trelleborgs FF	20	12	2	6	40	27	+13	26	
5	IFK Trelleborg	20	8	3	9	41	35	+6	19	
6	BK Fram, Landskrona	20	8	3	9	33	35	−2	19	
7	Malmö BI	20	8	2	10	43	38	+5	18	
8	IFK Simrishamn	20	6	5	9	33	54	−21	17	
9	Lunds BK	20	6	4	10	26	39	−13	16	Relegated
10	Hälsingborgs BoIS	20	5	3	12	30	40	−10	13	Relegated
11	Kävlinge GIF	20	1	4	15	17	55	−38	6	Relegated
