= Maths O. Sundqvist =

Swedish businessman (1950–2012)

Maths-Olov Sundqvist
- Born: 23 October 1950; Offerdal, Sweden
- Died: 23 September 2012 (aged 61); Häggenås, Sweden
- Occupation: Businessperson

Maths-Olov Sundqvist (23 October 1950 – 23 September 2012) was a Swedish entrepreneur and business magnate. Sundqvist was one of Sweden's wealthiest individuals; however, during the Great Recession, he was forced to sell most of his possessions at huge losses.

== Life and career ==
Sundqvist was born in 1950 in Offerdal in Krokom Municipality in Sweden. He began his business career by developing his father's bus company and finally selling it in 1979 to the municipality of Östersund for 8.7 million Swedish kronor. He used the proceeds to found his personal investment company Skrindan, which grew aggressively to become a big player in real estate. In 1992, he rescued the local newspaper Länstidningen in Östersund as it fell into financial difficulties. In 2002 he controlled a majority stake at the Länstidningen, as well as several other local companies.

Sundqvist was ranked in 2007 by the Swedish business magazine the Affärsvärlden as one of Sweden's wealthiest individuals after his acquisition of large blocks of shares in a number of Swedish corporations such as Hexagon, Fabege, Industrivärden and SCA. In 2008, his total portfolio was worth 10.4 billion Swedish kronor, and his portfolio of real estate was worth 7–8 billion Swedish kronor.

Due to declining stock prices during the Great Recession, Sundqvist was forced to sell large blocks of shares to refinance loans. Sundqvist had more than a billion in debts at the Carnegie Investment Bank, and was a contributing factor that the bank lost its banking license and was taken over by the Swedish National Debt Office. As Sundqvist was forced to sell most of his shares, he suffered huge losses.

== Death ==
In September 2012, Sundqvist was found dead next to his all-terrain vehicle near his residence in Häggenås, north of Östersund, in what was assumed to be a traffic accident. He was 61.
