= Kurt Elimä =

Swedish ski jumper (1939–2024)

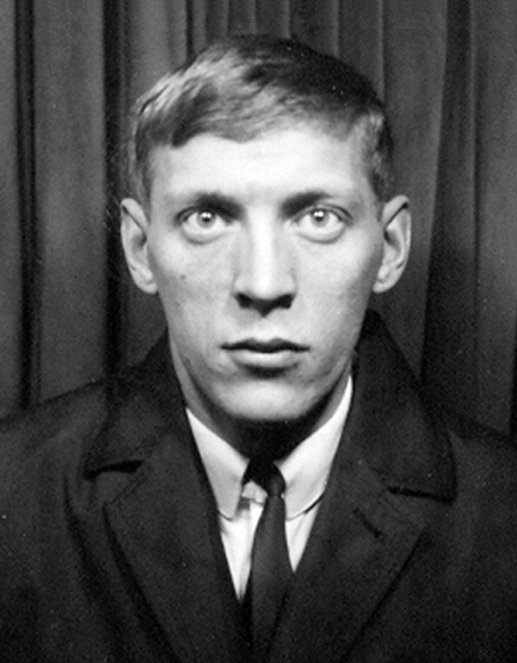

Personal information
- Full name: Kurt Sigvard Elimä
- Nickname: Kurre
- Born: 24 August 1939 Narken, Sweden
- Died: 28 March 2024 (age 84)
- Height: 1.75 m (5 ft 9 in)
- Weight: 68 kg (150 lb)

Sport
- Sport: Skiing
- Club: Malmbergets AIF; Gällivare; IFK Kiruna

World Cup career
- Seasons: 1964–1968

Kurt Sigvard Elimä (24 August 1939 – 28 March 2024) was a Swedish ski jumper who competed internationally from 1963 to 1968. He finished seventh in the individual normal hill event at the 1964 Winter Olympics in Innsbruck.

Elimä's best career finish international was fourth in an individual normal hill event in Austria in 1966.

"Kurre" won five Swedish Championships, participated in two Olympics (1964 and 1968) and one world cup. He finished third in the classic Garmisch-Partenkirchen and won the Swiss ski weeks. He was a Swedish champion in 1963–1965, 1967 and 1969 and received Stora Grabbars Märke in 1969.

== Biography ==
Kurt grew up in Korpilombolo, he has 12 siblings and was the second oldest.

Kurt was from a family of ski jumpers, with several brothers who have jumped including Lennart Elimä (who won Swedish Champions 1978) is one of those who also competed at a high level, and in the 1960s their father Lorenz Elimä built a jump on a hill in Malmberget.

Kurt started with a ski jumping club in Koskullskulle AIF; he also competed for the second tusk in his career as IFK Kiruna and Malmbergets AIF.

In Kaif (Koskullskulle AIF), he was also active after he stopped competing, he trained ski jumper Jan Boklöv who is the founder of V style that today is the basic style of ski jumping.

Kurt lived in Malmberget, and put in as coach of Kaif.
