= Bergkvara AIF =

- Full name: Bergkvara Allmänna Idrottsförening
- Short name: BAIF
- Founded: 1930
- Ground: Hagaborgs IP
- Chairman: Robert Karlsson
- Manager: Simon Andreasson
- League: Division 5 SÖ
- Website: bergkvaraaif.se
Home colours	Away colours

Bergkvara AIF is a Swedish sports club located in Bergkvara. The club was founded on April 13, 1930.
