= Häggenås SK =

Swedish sports club

- Full name: Häggenås sportklubb
- Sport: basketball, soccer, table tennis, skiing track and field athletics, racewalking, physical exercise, rink bandy
- Founded: 2 January 1932
- Based in: Häggenås, Sweden
- Ballpark: Tigervallen

Häggenås SK is a sports club in Häggenås, Sweden, established on 2 January 1932.

In 1951, the table tennis section was started.

The women's soccer team was started in 1972, and played three seasons in the Swedish top division between 1978 and 1980.
