= Häggenås =

- Location within Jämtland Location within Sweden
- Coordinates: 63°23′N 14°53′E
- Country: Sweden
- Province: Jämtland
- County: Jämtland County
- Municipality: Östersund Municipality

Area
  - Total: 0.74 km^{2} (0.29 sq mi)

Population (31 December 2010)
  - Total: 320
  - Density: 431/km^{2} (1,120/sq mi)
- Time zone: UTC+1 (CET)
  - Summer (DST): UTC+2 (CEST)

Häggenås is a locality situated in Östersund Municipality, Jämtland County, Sweden with 320 inhabitants in 2010.

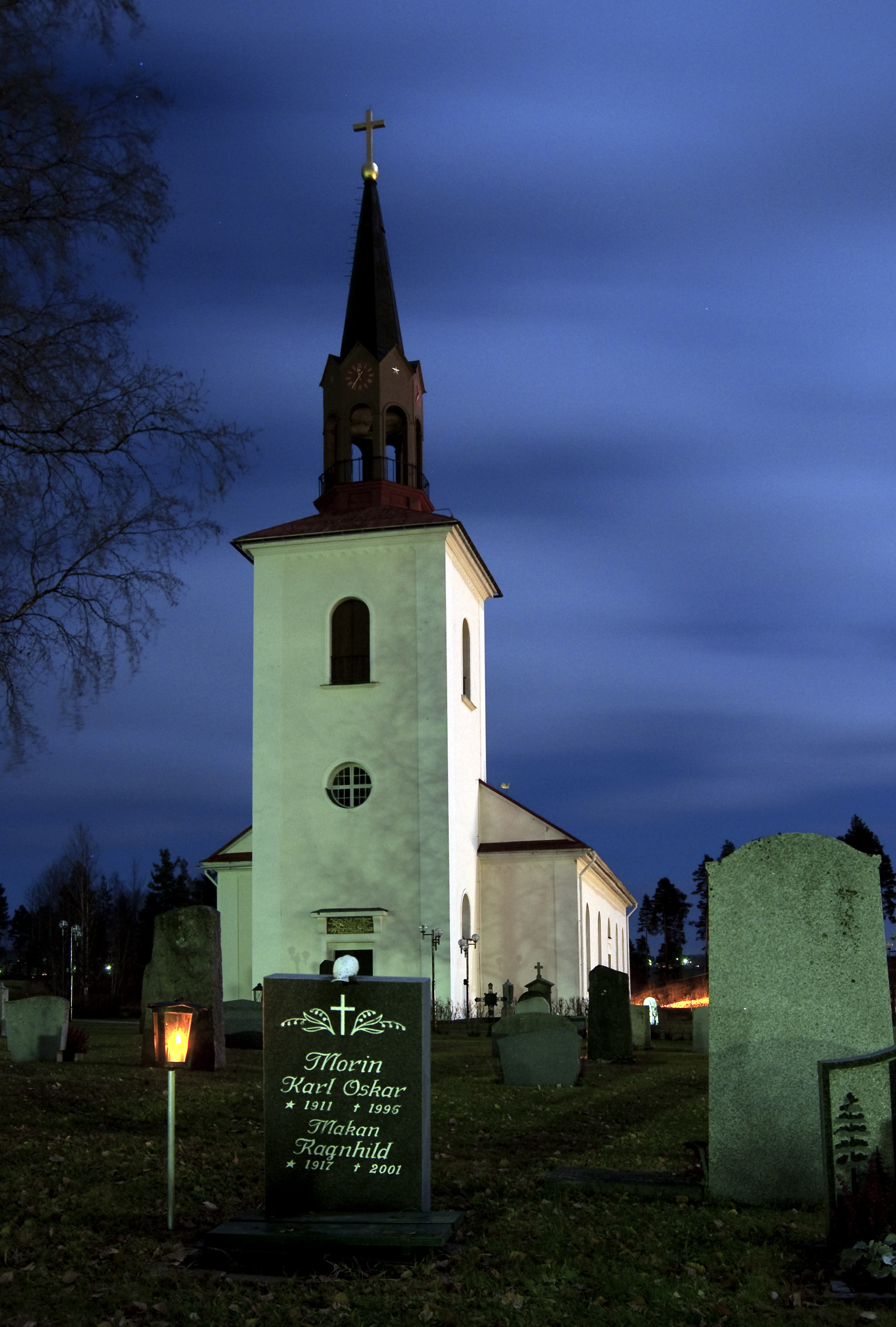
Häggenås Church

Häggenås Church (Häggenås kyrka) is in the Diocese of Härnösand. The church was completed in 1837 based upon drawings by builder Lars David Geting and architect Samuel Enander. An extensive renovation took place in the years 1921-1922
