= IK Tellus =

Swedish football club

- Full name: Idrottsklubben Tellus
- Founded: 1921
- Ground: Aspuddens IP; Tellusborg; Stockholm; Sweden
- Chairman: Patrik Bodare
- Head coach: Pär Svensson
- Coach: Richard Engh
- League: Division 3 Östra Svealand
- 2009: Division 3 Södra Svealand, 9th
Home colours

IK Tellus is a Swedish sports club, having teams in football, bandy and handball. The club is located in Tellusborg, Stockholm.

== Background ==
Tellusborgs IF was formed on 11 April 1921 and brought together several disparate groups of youngsters in Tellusborg after much negotiation. However, controversy about the club name remained and at a Sunday meeting at the Dövas Café on 11 April 1923 the name was changed to IK Tellus.

== Football ==
Since their foundation IK Tellus has participated mainly in the middle and lower divisions of the Swedish football league system. The club currently plays in Division 3 Östra Svealand which is the fifth tier of Swedish football. They play their home matches at the Aspuddens IP in Tellusborg.

IK Tellus are affiliated to the Stockholms Fotbollförbund.

=== Season to season ===
Season	Level	Division	Section	Position	Movements
1999	Tier 5	Division 4	Stockholm Mellersta	12th	Relegated
2000	Tier 6	Division 5	Stockholm Södra	2nd	Promoted
2001	Tier 5	Division 4	Stockholm Mellersta	5th	
2002	Tier 5	Division 4	Stockholm Mellersta	10th	
2003	Tier 5	Division 4	Stockholm Mellersta	9th	
2004	Tier 5	Division 4	Stockholm Mellersta	11th	Relegated
2005	Tier 6	Division 5	Stockholm Södra	3rd	Promoted
2006*	Tier 6	Division 4	Stockholm Södra	1st	Promoted
2007	Tier 5	Division 3	Östra Svealand	3rd	
2008	Tier 5	Division 3	Södra Svealand	9th	
2009	Tier 5	Division 3	Södra Svealand	9th	
2010	Tier 5	Division 3	Östra Svealand	8th	
2011	Tier 5	Division 3	Södra Svealand	10th	Relegated

* League restructuring in 2006 resulted in a new division being created at Tier 3 and subsequent divisions dropping a level.

== Handball ==
The club is also playing handball. The women's handball team played the 1965–1966 season in the Swedish top division.
