= Gällivare Malmbergets FF =

Swedish football club

- Full name: Gällivare-Malmbergets Fotbollsförening
- Nickname: GMFF
- Founded: 2005; 20 years ago
- Ground: Malmbergets IP; Gällivare, Sweden
- Head coach: Peter Askebrand
- Coach: Kent Renlund; Joachim Karlsson
- League: Division 4 Norrbotten Norra
- 2018: Division 2 Norrland, 14th (relegated)
| Home colours | Away colours |

Gällivare Malmbergets FF is a Swedish football club in Gällivare.

== Background ==
Since its foundation in 2005, Gällivare Malmbergets FF has participated in the middle divisions of the Swedish football league system. The club currently plays in Division 2 Norrland which is the fifth tier of Swedish football.

After many years of discussion, the football team of Gällivare Sportklubb (GSK) was merged with Malmbergets Allmänna Idrottsförening (MAIF) at the end of the 2005 season and the new club is now called Gällivare-Malmbergets Fotbollsförening (GMFF). Youth operations are still conducted under the GSK banner and Malmbergets AIF now runs a side in the lower divisions. GMFF plays its home matches at the Malmbergets IP in Gällivare Municipality.

Gällivare Malmbergets FF is affiliated to the Norrbottens Fotbollförbund.

== Recent history ==
In recent seasons Gällivare Malmbergets FF have competed in the following divisions:

2018 – Division 2 Norrland
2017 – Division 2 Norrland
2016 – Division 2 Norrland
2015 – Division 2 Norrland
2014 – Division 3 Norra Norrland
2013 – Division 3 Norra Norrland
2012 – Division 3 Norra Norrland
2011 – Division 3 Norra Norrland

2010 – Division 3 Norra Norrland
2009 – Division 3 Norra Norrland
2008 – Division 3 Norra Norrland
2007 – Division 3 Norra Norrland
2006 – Division 3 Norra Norrland

Gällivare SK have competed in the following divisions:

2005 – Division 4 Norrbotten norra
2004 – Division 4 Norrbotten norra
2003 – Division 4 Norrbotten Norra
2002 – Division 4 Norrbotten Norra
2001 – Division 3 Norra Norrland
2000 – Division 3 Norra Norrland
1999 – Division 2 Norrland
1998 – Division 2 Norrland
1997 – Division 2 Norrland
1996 – Division 2 Norrland
1995 – Division 2 Norrland
1994 – Division 2 Norrland
1993 – Division 2 Norrland

== Attendances ==
In recent seasons Gällivare Malmbergets FF have had the following average attendances:

| Season | Average attendance | Division / Section | Level |
|---|---|---|---|
| 2006 | 335 | Div 3 Norra Norrland | Tier 5 |
| 2007 | 381 | Div 3 Norra Norrland | Tier 5 |
| 2008 | 163 | Div 3 Norra Norrland | Tier 5 |
| 2009 | 346 | Div 3 Norra Norrland | Tier 5 |
| 2010 | 214 | Div 3 Norra Norrland | Tier 5 |

* Attendances are provided in the Publikliga sections of the Svenska Fotbollförbundet website.
