= Hornskrokens IF =

Swedish sports club

- Full name: Hornskrokens idrottsförening
- Sport: handball bandy, soccer, orienteering, skiing (earlier)
- Founded: 23 May 1933
- Based in: Boden, Sweden
- Ballpark: Hildursborg

Hornskrokens IF is a sports club in Boden, Sweden. It was established on 23 May 1933 and runs handball, earlier even bandy, soccer, orienteering and skiing. In 1983, the club played in the qualifying rounds for the Handball Allsvenskan.

The women’s soccer team played five seasons in the Swedish top division between 1978 and 1986.
