= Älmhults IF =

Swedish football club

- Full name: Älmhults Idrottsförening
- Nickname: ÄIF
- Founded: 22 April 1919
- Ground: Älmevallen* 19Älmhult * 19 Sweden
- Chairman: Magnus Olsson
- Head coach: Simon Sjöfors
- Coach: Ola Adaktusson
- League: Division 3 Sydvästra Götaland
- 2010: Division 3 Sydöstra Götaland, 2nd
Home colours	Away colours

Älmhults IF is a Swedish football club located in Älmhult in Kronoberg County.

== History ==
Älmhults Idrottsförening was founded on 22 April 1919. The sports club organizes bandy, ice-hockey, skiing and track and field as well as football. The club has used Älmevallen playing field since 1929. The youth teams use Haganässkolan.

Älmhults IF participated mainly in the middle divisions of the Swedish football league system. As of 2011 the club played in Division 3 Sydvästra Götaland, the fifth tier of Swedish football. Their home matches are at the Älmevallen in Älmhult.

Älmhults IF are affiliated with Smålands Fotbollförbund.

== Recent history ==
In recent seasons Älmhults IF have competed in the following divisions:

- 2016 — Division III, Sydöstra Götaland
- 2015 – Division III, Sydöstra Götaland
- 2014 – Division III, Sydöstra Götaland
- 2013 – Division III, Sydvästra Götaland
- 2012 – Division III, Sydöstra Götaland
- 2011 – Division III, Sydvästra Götaland
- 2010 – Division III, Sydöstra Götaland
- 2009 – Division III, Sydöstra Götaland
- 2008 – Division III, Sydöstra Götaland
- 2007 – Division III, Sydöstra Götaland
- 2006 – Division IV, Småland Södra Elit
- 2005 – Division IV, Småland Västra Elit
- 2004 – Division IV, Småland Östra Elit
- 2003 – Division III, Sydvästra Götaland
- 2002 – Division IV, Småland Västra Elit
- 2001 – Division IV, Småland Västra Elit
- 2000 – Division III, Sydvästra Götaland
- 1999 – Division III, Sydöstra Götaland
- 1998 – Division III, Sydöstra Götaland
- 1997 – Division II, Östra Götaland
- 1996 – Division II, Östra Götaland
- 1995 – Division II, Östra Götaland
- 1994 – Division III, Sydöstra Götaland
- 1993 – Division III, Sydöstra Götaland

== Attendances ==
In recent seasons Älmhults IF have had the following average attendances:

Season	Average attendance	Division / Section	Level
2006	Not available	Div 4 Småland Södra Elit	Tier 6
2007	289	Div 3 Sydöstra Götaland	Tier 5
2008	266	Div 3 Sydöstra Götaland	Tier 5
2009	325	Div 3 Sydöstra Götaland	Tier 5
2010	343	Div 3 Sydöstra Götaland	Tier 5

* Attendances are provided in the Publikliga sections of the Svenska Fotbollförbundet website.
