= Malmbergets AIF =

Sports club in Malmberget, Sweden

Malmbergets Almänna Idrottsförening, MAIF, is a multi-sport club from Malmberget, Norrbotten, Sweden. The club has been most successful in team handball and Nordic skiing.

== History ==
The club was founded on 22 February 1904. Initially, the club arranged Nordic skiing and cross-country running contests, whereas the construction of a football pitch started in 1905. The club was «restructured» in 1916, and incorporated the wrestling club BK Thule in 1917 and the skiing club Malmbergets SF in 1920. The club's first great athlete was the wrestler J. Välima, who became Swedish champion in 1919 and competed at the 1921 World Championships. In 1936 the bandy section was discontinued, but it was replaced by an ice hockey section in 1944. An orienteering section was also added, in 1943. In 1951, alpine skiing commenced, and ski orienteering was added in 1975.

The men's football team was promoted to Division 4 in 1955 and Division 3 the following year. They were however relegated from the 1956–57 Swedish football Division 3. In 1957 the club added sections for tennis and handball, followed by volleyball in 1976. In 1960 the indoor arena Sporthallen was inaugurated, seeing a boxing exhibition with Floyd Patterson in 1965. It was then one of the venues of the 1967 World Men's Handball Championship.

While Malmbergets AIF got several national champions in various sports, Kurt Elimä became an Olympic ski jumper in the 1960s. Lena Carlzon-Lundbäck was a dominating cross-country skier in the 1970s, whereas Lina Andersson broke through in the late 1990s.

The handball teams also saw success. Malmberget's women's team became runners-up in the Swedish championship of 1973. The men's team made the playoff to the highest league in 1970, and finally succeeded to qualify for the 1975–76 Allsvenskan. The season ended in relegation. Malmberget was later a venue in the 1994 European Men's Handball Championship qualification.

In 1994, the club had its first national champion in powerlifting. Other sections in the club include weightlifting, table tennis, gymnastics and figure skating.

The men's football team merged with Gällivare SK after the 2005 season to play under the name Gällivare-Malmbergets FF. In addition, a Malmbergets AIF team was reinstated after the 2007 season. Later, the men's football team was discontinued, while the women's senior team played in Division 3.
