= Frånö SK =

Swedish football club

Frånö SK is a Swedish football club based in Kramfors currently playing in the Division 4 Ångermanland of the Swedish football league system. The club was formed on 4 January 1932.
