= Kungshamns IF =

Swedish football club

- Full name: Kungshamns Idrottsförening
- Nickname(s): KIF
- Founded: 1919
- Ground: Kungshamnsvallen; Kungshamn; Sweden
- Chairman: Mikael Lundin
- League: Division 4 Bohuslän/Dalsland
Home colours	Away colours

Kungshamns IF is a Swedish football club located in Kungshamn.

== Background ==
Kungshamns IF currently plays in Division 4 Bohuslän/Dalsland which is the sixth tier of Swedish football. They play their home matches at the Kungshamnsvallen in Kungshamn.

The club is affiliated to Bohusläns Fotbollförbund. The second team, Sotenäs FC, play in Division 6. Kungshamns IF have competed in the Svenska Cupen on 19 occasions and have played 25 matches in the competition.

== Season to season ==
Season	Level	Division	Section	Position	Movements
1993	Tier 4	Division 3	Nordvästra Götaland	4th	
1994	Tier 4	Division 3	Nordvästra Götaland	8th	
1995	Tier 4	Division 3	Nordvästra Götaland	8th	
1996	Tier 4	Division 3	Nordvästra Götaland	10th	Relegated
1997	Tier 5	Division 4	Bohuslän/Dalsland	1st	Promoted
1998	Tier 4	Division 3	Nordvästra Götaland	9th	Relegation Playoffs
1999	Tier 4	Division 3	Nordvästra Götaland	11th	Relegated
2000	Tier 5	Division 4	Bohuslän/Dalsland	4th	
2001	Tier 5	Division 4	Bohuslän/Dalsland	3rd	
2002	Tier 5	Division 4	Bohuslän/Dalsland	3rd	
2003	Tier 5	Division 4	Bohuslän/Dalsland	7th	
2004	Tier 5	Division 4	Bohuslän/Dalsland	8th	
2005	Tier 5	Division 4	Bohuslän/Dalsland	2nd	Promotion Playoffs - Promoted
2006*	Tier 5	Division 3	Nordvästra Götaland	9th	Relegation Playoffs
2007	Tier 5	Division 3	Nordvästra Götaland	12th	Relegated
2008	Tier 6	Division 4	Bohuslän/Dalsland	1st	Promoted
2009	Tier 5	Division 3	Nordvästra Götaland	11th	Relegated
2010	Tier 6	Division 4	Bohuslän/Dalsland	5th	
2011	Tier 6	Division 4	Bohuslän/Dalsland	4th	

* League restructuring in 2006 resulted in a new division being created at Tier 3 and subsequent divisions dropping a level.
