= Söderhamns FF =

Swedish football club

- Full name: Söderhamns Fotbollförening
- Founded: 1986
- Ground: Hällåsens IP; Söderhamn; Sweden
- Chairman: Lennart Wikström
- Coach: Dennis Ohlsson; Alexander Blom
- League: Division 2 Norrland
- 2010: Division 3 Södra Norrland, 5th
- Website: www.soderhamnsff.se
Home colours	Away colours

Söderhamns FF is a Swedish football club located in Söderhamn in Gävleborg County.

== Background ==
Söderhamns Fotbollförening were founded on 28 January 1986. The club was formed after the Söderhamns IF football section was closed down.

Since their foundation Söderhamns FF has participated mainly in the middle divisions of the Swedish football league system. The club currently plays in Division 3 Södra Norrland which is the fifth tier of Swedish football. They play their home matches at the Hällåsens IP in Söderhamn. Their home venue was inaugurated on 25 July 1987.

Söderhamns FF are affiliated to Hälsinglands Fotbollförbund.

== Recent history ==
In recent seasons Söderhamns FF have competed in the following divisions:

2016 – Division II, Norrland
2015 – Division II, Norrland
2014 – Division II, Norrland
2013 – Division III, Södra Norrland
2012 – Division IV, Hälsingland
2011 – Division III, Södra Norrland
2010 – Division III, Södra Norrland
2009 – Division II, Norra Svealand
2008 – Division II, Norra Svealand
2007 – Division III, Södra Norrland
2006 – Division III, Mellersta Norrland
2005 – Division III, Södra Norrland
2004 – Division III, Södra Norrland
2003 – Division III, Södra Norrland
2002 – Division II, Norrland
2001 – Division II, Norrland
2000 – Division III, Södra Norrland
1999 – Division II, Östra Svealand
1998 – Division II, Östra Svealand
1997 – Division III, Södra Norrland
1996 – Division III, Södra Norrland
1995 – Division IV, Hälsingland
1994 – Division III, Södra Norrland
1993 – Division III, Södra Norrland

== Attendances ==
In recent seasons Söderhamns FF have had the following average attendances:

Season	Average attendance	Division / Section	Level
2001	395	Div 2 Norrland	Tier 3
2002	278	Div 2 Norrland	Tier 3
2003	219	Div 3 Södra Norrland	Tier 4
2004	169	Div 3 Södra Norrland	Tier 4
2005	191	Div 3 Södra Norrland	Tier 4
2006	209	Div 3 Mellersta Norrland	Tier 5
2007	298	Div 3 Södra Norrland	Tier 5
2008	298	Div 2 Norra Svealand	Tier 4
2009	209	Div 2 Norra Svealand	Tier 4
2010	262	Div 3 Södra Norrland	Tier 5

* Attendances are provided in the Publikliga sections of the Svenska Fotbollförbundet website and European Football Statistics website.

== Current squad ==
As of Start of the 2016 season

Note: Flags indicate national team as defined under FIFA eligibility rules; some limited exceptions apply. Players may hold more than one non-FIFA nationality.

No.	Pos.	Nation	Player
1		SWE	Adam Skhiri
2		SWE	Tommy Nordh
3		SWE	Adam Jonsson
4		SWE	Fredrik Stenberg
5		SWE	Pontus Olsson
6		PER	Jonas Garcia Persson
7		NGA	ONYEMELUKWE henry
8		SWE	Andreas Rodin
9		SWE	Max Berglund
10		SWE	Niklas Holm
11		SWE	Marcus Olofsson
12		SWE	Robin Olofsson

No.	Pos.	Nation	Player
13		SWE	Fredrik Rosén
14		SWE	Joel Nordgren
15		SWE	Felix Lingman
16		SWE	Alexander Blom
17		SWE	Marcus "Englundface" Englund
18		SWE	Simon Fäger
19		SWE	Martin "Ella" Elffors
20		PER	Johan "Pee" Persson
21		SWE	Nermin Celjo
22		SWE	Filip Enarsson
23		SWE	Simon Elgh
25		SWE	Martin Strid
