= IFK Kalix =

Swedish football club

- Full name: Idrottsföreningen Kamraterna Kalix
- Ground: Furuvallen; Kalix; Sweden
- Chairman: Henrietta Snoddgrass
- Head coach: Jouko Liakka
- League: Division 3 Norra Norrland
Home colours

IFK Kalix is a Swedish football club located in Kalix in Norrbotten County.

== Background ==
IFK Kalix currently plays in Division 3 Norra Norrland which is the fifth tier of Swedish football. They play their home matches at the Furuvallen in Kalix.

The club is affiliated to Norrbottens Fotbollförbund. IFK Kalix won the Midnattsolscupen (Midnight Sun Cup) in 1998.

The club used to have a bandy department, but this was untied from the club in 1990, combined with Nyborgs SK to form Kalix BF. Kalix BF is now (2014) playing in Elitserien, the top-tier of Swedish bandy.

== Season to season ==
Season	Level	Division	Section	Position	Movements
1993	Tier 5	Division 4	Norrbotten Norra	1st	Promoted
1994	Tier 4	Division 3	Norra Norrland	3rd	
1995	Tier 4	Division 3	Norra Norrland	8th	
1996	Tier 4	Division 3	Norra Norrland	7th	
1997	Tier 4	Division 3	Norra Norrland	8th	
1998	Tier 4	Division 3	Norra Norrland	2nd	Promotion Playoffs
1999	Tier 4	Division 3	Norra Norrland	2nd	
2000	Tier 4	Division 3	Norra Norrland	11th	Relegated
2001	Tier 5	Division 4	Norrbotten Norra	7th	
2002	Tier 5	Division 4	Norrbotten Norra	5th	
2003	Tier 5	Division 4	Norrbotten Norra	4th	
2004	Tier 5	Division 4	Norrbotten Norra	4th	
2005	Tier 5	Division 4	Norrbotten Norra	7th	
2006*	Tier 6	Division 4	Norrbotten Norra	4th	
2007	Tier 6	Division 4	Norrbotten Norra	3rd	
2008	Tier 6	Division 4	Norrbotten Norra	1st	Promoted
2009	Tier 5	Division 3	Norra Norrland	10th	Relegated
2010	Tier 6	Division 4	Norrbotten Norra	2nd	Promoted
2011	Tier 5	Division 3	Norra Norrland	9th	Relegation Playoffs – Relegated
2016	Tier 5	Division 3	Norra Norrland	5th	
2017	Tier 5	Division 3	Norra Norrland	2nd	Promotion Playoffs

* League restructuring in 2006 resulted in a new division being created at Tier 3 and subsequent divisions dropping a level.

== Attendances ==
In recent seasons IFK Kalix have had the following average attendances:

Season	Average attendance	Division / Section	Level
2008	Not available	Div 4 Norrbotten Norra	Tier 6
2009	208	Div 3 Norra Norrland	Tier 5
2010	139	Div 4 Norrbotten Norra	Tier 6

* Attendances are provided in the Publikliga sections of the Svenska Fotbollförbundet website and European Football Statistics website.
