= 1928–29 in Swedish football =

The 1928-29 season in Swedish football, starting August 1928 and ending July 1929:

== Honours ==
=== Official titles ===
Title	Team	Reason
1928–29 Swedish Champions	None	–

=== Competitions ===
Level	Competition	Team
1st level	Allsvenskan 1928–29	Helsingborgs IF
2nd level	Division 2 Norra 1928–29	Sandvikens IF
2nd level	Division 2 Södra 1928–29	Hallstahammars SK
Regional Championship	Norrländska Mästerskapet 1929	Bodens BK

== Promotions, relegations and qualifications ==
=== Promotions ===
Promoted from	Promoted to	Team	Reason
Division 2 Norra 1928–29	Allsvenskan 1929–30	Sandvikens IF	Winners
Division 2 Södra 1928–29	Allsvenskan 1929–30	Stattena IF	Winners
Division 3 1928–29	Division 2 Norra 1929–30	Köpings IS	Winners of promotion play-off
Division 3 1928–29	Division 2 Norra 1929–30	Sandvikens AIK	Winners of promotion play-off
Division 3 1928–29	Division 2 Södra 1929–30	BK Derby	Winners of promotion play-off
Division 3 1928–29	Division 2 Södra 1929–30	IFK Kristianstad	Winners of promotion play-off

=== Relegations ===
Relegated from	Relegated to	Team	Reason
Allsvenskan 1928–29	Division 2 Norra 1929–30	IFK Eskilstuna	11th team
Allsvenskan 1928–29	Division 2 Norra 1929–30	Westermalms IF	12th team
Division 2 Norra 1928–29	Division 3 1929–30	Djurgårdens IF	9th team
Division 2 Norra 1928–29	Division 3 1929–30	IFK Stockholm	10th team
Division 2 Södra 1928–29	Division 3 1929–30	Jonsereds IF	10th team

== Domestic results ==
=== Allsvenskan 1928–29 ===

	Team	Pld	W	D	L	GF		GA	GD	Pts
1	Helsingborgs IF	22	16	3	3	89	–	35	+54	35
2	Örgryte IS	22	15	3	4	72	–	42	+30	33
3	IFK Göteborg	22	14	4	4	56	–	34	+22	32
4	IK Sleipner	22	11	3	8	54	–	49	+5	25
5	GAIS	22	9	4	9	47	–	43	+4	22
6	IF Elfsborg	22	8	3	11	41	–	54	-13	19
7	Landskrona BoIS	22	8	2	12	37	–	47	-10	18
8	IFK Malmö	22	8	2	12	32	–	47	-15	18
9	AIK	22	7	3	12	47	–	55	-8	17
10	IFK Norrköping	22	4	8	10	25	–	33	-8	16
11	IFK Eskilstuna	22	7	2	13	41	–	74	-33	16
12	Westermalms IF	22	5	3	14	34	–	62	-28	13

=== Division 2 Norra 1928–29 ===

	Team	Pld	W	D	L	GF		GA	GD	Pts
1	Sandvikens IF	18	13	2	3	56	–	20	+36	28
2	Hallstahammars SK	18	8	5	5	31	–	28	+3	21
3	Sundbybergs IK	18	10	0	8	45	–	38	+7	20
4	Hammarby IF	18	8	3	7	30	–	27	+3	19
5	Gefle IF	18	6	5	7	39	–	34	+5	17
6	Surahammars IF	18	5	7	6	37	–	41	-4	17
7	IFK Västerås	18	7	1	10	32	–	43	-11	15
8	IK City	18	5	5	8	34	–	51	-17	15
9	Djurgårdens IF	18	5	4	9	27	–	37	-10	14
10	IFK Stockholm	18	7	0	11	34	–	43	-9	14

=== Division 2 Södra 1928–29 ===
	Team	Pld	W	D	L	GF		GA	GD	Pts
1	Stattena IF	18	12	3	3	45	–	22	+23	27
2	Redbergslids IK	18	12	1	5	47	–	25	+22	25
3	Halmstads BK	18	11	1	6	46	–	29	+17	23
4	Malmö FF	18	8	2	8	42	–	41	+1	18
5	Kalmar FF	18	6	4	8	42	–	44	-2	16
6	IFK Uddevalla	18	7	1	10	29	–	43	-14	15
7	Fässbergs IF	18	7	0	11	36	–	42	-6	14
8	Krokslätts FF	18	6	2	10	29	–	40	-11	14
9	IS Halmia	18	5	4	9	23	–	34	-11	14
10	Jonsereds IF	18	6	2	10	30	–	49	-19	14

=== Division 2 promotion play-off 1928–29 ===
23 June 1929

Sandvikens AIK	4–0	Södertälje SK

?, ?
30 June 1929

Södertälje SK	0–5	Sandvikens AIK

?, ?

9 June 1929

IFK Kumla	1–2	Köpings IS

?, ?
16 June 1929

Köpings IS	1–1	IFK Kumla

?, ?

9 June 1929

BK Derby	4–1	Kalmar AIK

?, ?
16 June 1929

Kalmar AIK	2–3	BK Derby

?, ?

9 June 1929

Majornas IK	0–4	IFK Kristianstad

?, ?
16 June 1929

IFK Kristianstad	7–2	Majornas IK

?, ?

=== Norrländska Mästerskapet 1929 ===
Final

August 25, 1929

Norrbyskärs GIK	2–3	Bodens BK

Norrbyskärs fotbollsplan, Norrbyskär

== National team results ==
September 2, 1928
Friendly
№ 136

Finland	2–3	Sweden
Malmgren 55'; Kanerva 77'		Bergström 3'; Andersson 8', 79'

Tölö bollplan, Helsinki
Attendance: 5,000
Referee: Andersen (Norway)

Sweden: Evald Andersson - Rudolf Carlsson, Ingvar Persson - Walfrid Persson, Bror Persson, Einar Snitt - Ernst Lööf, Hilmer Johansson, Erik Bergström, Helge Andersson, Sigurd Roos.

September 30, 1928
Friendly
№ 137

Sweden	2–0	Germany
Lundahl 44' (p); Olsson 89'

Stockholms Stadion, Stockholm
Attendance: 20,000
Referee: Hansen (Denmark)

Sweden: Anders Rydberg - Axel Alfredsson, Gunnar Zacharoff - Åke Hansson, Nils Rosén, Torsten Johansson - Charles Brommesson, Gunnar Olsson, Harry Lundahl, Tore Keller, Knut Kroon.

October 7, 1928
1924–28 Nordic Championship
№ 138

Denmark	3–1	Sweden
Rohde 6'; Jørgensen 8'; Nilsson 31'		Rydell 32'

Idrætsparken, Copenhagen
Attendance: 27,500
Referee: Spranger (Germany)

Sweden: Anders Rydberg - Axel Alfredsson, Gunnar Zacharoff - Åke Hansson, Herbert Lundgren, Torsten Johansson - Rune Wenzel, Sven Rydell, Harry Lundahl, Wilhelm Engdahl, Knut Kroon.

June 9, 1929
Friendly
№ 139

Sweden	6–2	Netherlands
Dahl 11'; Rydell 17', 70', 77'; Kools 74' (og); Nilsson 84'		Smeets 73', 82'

Stockholms Stadion, Stockholm
Attendance: 17,000
Referee: Remke (Denmark)

Sweden: Sigfrid Lindberg - Folke Andersson, Douglas Krook - Åke Hansson, Henning Helgesson, Allan Billing - John Nilsson, Sven Rydell, Per Kaufeldt, Albin Dahl, Knut Kroon.

June 14, 1929
1929–32 Nordic Championship
№ 140

Sweden	3–1	Finland
Lundahl 38' (p), 44'; Holmberg 76'		Koponen 75'

Stockholms Stadion, Stockholm
Attendance: 16,982
Referee: Schieldrop (Norway)

Sweden: Gunnar Ragnar - Nils Axelsson, Arne Johansson - Svante Kvist, Nils Rosén, Verner Andersson - Vigor Lindberg, Bertil Thulin, Harry Lundahl, Carl-Erik Holmberg, Wilhelm Engdahl.

June 16, 1929
1929–32 Nordic Championship
№ 141

Sweden	3–2	Denmark
Nilsson 9'; Kaufeldt 31'; Kroon 49'		Larsen 64'; Uldaler 66'

Slottsskogsvallen, Gothenburg
Attendance: 20,553
Referee: Bauwens (Germany)

Sweden: Sigfrid Lindberg - Folke Andersson, Douglas Krook - Åke Hansson, Henning Helgesson, Allan Billing - John Nilsson, Sven Rydell, Per Kaufeldt, Albin Dahl, Knut Kroon.

June 23, 1929
Friendly
№ 142

Germany	3–0	Sweden
Hofmann 27', 63', 85'

Kölner Stadion, Cologne
Attendance: 60,000
Referee: Braun (Austria)

Sweden: Gunnar Ragnar - Folke Andersson, Douglas Krook - Henning Helgesson, Nils Rosén, Allan Billing - John Nilsson, Sven Rydell, Per Kaufeldt, Albin Dahl, Wilhelm Engdahl.

July 7, 1929
Friendly
№ 143

Sweden	4–1	Estonia
Lundahl 13', 65'; Kroon 19'; H. Dahl 79' (p)		Idlane 88'

Landskrona IP, Landskrona
Attendance: 10,000
Referee: Remke (Denmark)

Sweden: Sigfrid Lindberg - Erik Linder (46' Carl Huldt), Nils Axelsson - Svante Kvist, Fritz Lindfors, Erik Persson - Erik Jönsson, Harry Dahl, Harry Lundahl, Albin Dahl, Knut Kroon.

July 28, 1929
Friendly
№ 144

Sweden	10–0	Latvia
Dahl 10', 67'; Rydell 13'; Kroon 15', 63'; Andersson 46', 77', 87'; Helgesson 62'; Nilsson 83'

Malmö IP, Malmö
Attendance: 8,944
Referee: Remke (Denmark)

Sweden: Sigfrid Lindberg - Herbert Samuelsson, Douglas Krook - Evert Blomgren, Henning Helgesson, Allan Billing - John Nilsson, Sven Rydell, Rupert Andersson, Albin Dahl, Knut Kroon.

== National team players in season 1928/29 ==
name	pos.	caps	goals	club
Axel "Massa" Alfredsson	DF	2	0	Hälsingborgs IF
Evald "Pony" Andersson	GK	1	0	Sundbybergs IK
Folke "Börje" Andersson	DF	3	0	IK Sleipner
Helge "Hegge" Andersson	FW	1	2	IFK Västerås
Rupert "Rubba" Andersson	FW	1	3	IK Sleipner
Verner "Mickel" Andersson	MF	1	0	IFK Göteborg
Nils Axelsson	DF	2	0	Hälsingborgs IF
Erik "Lara" Bergström	FW	1	1	IFK Västerås
Allan "Rovern" Billing	MF	4	0	Örgryte IS
Evert "Blommar" Blomgren	MF	1	0	IK Sleipner
Charles "Bromme" Brommesson	FW	1	0	Hälsingborgs IF
Rudolf Carlsson (Karlsson)	DF	1	0	Sandvikens IF
Albin Dahl	FW	5	3	Hälsingborgs IF
Harry "Hacke" Dahl	FW	1	1	Landskrona BoIS
Wilhelm "Ville" Engdahl	FW	3	0	AIK
Åke Hansson	MF	4	0	IFK Göteborg
Henning "Charmören" Helgesson	MF	4	1	Örgryte IS
Carl-Erik "Slana" Holmberg	FW	1	1	Örgryte IS
Carl Huldt	DF	1	0	Landskrona BoIS
Arne "Tysken" Johansson	DF	1	0	Hälsingborgs IF
Hilmer "Hille" Johansson	FW	1	0	IFK Västerås
Torsten Johansson	MF	2	0	IFK Norrköping
Erik "Pilsa" Jönsson	FW	1	0	IFK Malmö
Per "Pära" Kaufeldt	FW	3	1	AIK
Tore Keller	FW	1	0	IK Sleipner
Douglas "Världens bäste" Krook	DF	4	0	Örgryte IS
Knut "Knutte" Kroon	FW	6	4	Hälsingborgs IF
Svante Kvist	MF	2	0	Landskrona BoIS
Sigfrid "Sigge" Lindberg	GK	4	0	Hälsingborgs IF
Vigor "Kuta" Lindberg	FW	1	0	IK Sleipner
Erik Linder	DF	1	0	Landskrona BoIS
Fritz "Fritte" Lindfors	MF	1	0	Landskrona BoIS
Ernst Lööf	FW	1	0	Sandvikens AIK
Harry Lundahl	FW	4	5	Hälsingborgs IF
Herbert Lundgren	DF/MF	1	0	GAIS
John "Jompa" Nilsson	FW	4	3	AIK
Gunnar "Lill-Gunnar" Olsson	FW	1	1	Hälsingborgs IF
Bror Persson	MF	1	0	Stattena IF
Erik "Krassi" Persson	MF	1	0	Hälsingborgs IF
Ingvar Persson	DF	1	0	Sandvikens IF
Walfrid "Valle" Persson	MF	1	0	Sandvikens IF
Gunnar "Pliggen" Ragnar	GK	2	0	IFK Norrköping
Sigurd (Sigfrid) "Rosa" Roos	FW	1	0	IFK Västerås
Nils "Rossi" Rosén	MF	3	0	Hälsingborgs IF
Anders Rydberg	GK	2	0	IFK Göteborg
Sven "Trollgubben" Rydell	FW	5	5	Örgryte IS
Herbert Samuelsson	DF	1	0	IFK Göteborg
Einar Snitt	MF	1	0	Sandvikens IF
Bertil Thulin	FW	1	0	GAIS
Rune Wenzel	FW	1	0	GAIS
Gunnar Zacharoff (Zackaroff)	DF	2	0	GAIS
