= 1927–28 in Swedish football =

The 1927-28 season in Swedish football, starting August 1927 and ending July 1928:

== Honours ==
=== Official titles ===
Title	Team	Reason
1927–28 Swedish Champions	None	–

=== Competitions ===
Level	Competition	Team
1st level	Allsvenskan 1927–28	Örgryte IS
2nd level	Division 2 Uppsvenska Serien 1927–28	Sandvikens IF
2nd level	Division 2 Mellansvenska Serien 1927–28	Hallstahammars SK
2nd level	Division 2 Östsvenska Serien 1927–28	Westermalms IF
2nd level	Division 2 Västsvenska Serien 1927–28	Redbergslids IK
2nd level	Division 2 Sydsvenska Serien 1927–28	IFK Malmö
Regional Championship	Norrländska Mästerskapet 1928	Bodens BK

== Promotions, relegations and qualifications ==
=== Promotions ===
Promoted from	Promoted to	Team	Reason
Division 2 Östsvenska Serien 1927–28	Allsvenskan 1928–29	Westermalms IF	Winners of promotion play-off
Division 2 Sydvenska Serien 1927–28	Allsvenskan 1928–29	IFK Malmö	Winners of promotion play-off

=== League transfers ===
Transferred from	Transferred to	Team	Reason
Division 2 Uppsvenska Serien 1927–28	Division 2 Norra 1928–29	Sandvikens IF	Winners
Division 2 Uppsvenska Serien 1927–28	Division 2 Norra 1928–29	Gefle IF	2nd team
Division 2 Mellansvenska Serien 1927–28	Division 2 Norra 1928–29	Hallstahammars SK	Winners
Division 2 Mellansvenska Serien 1927–28	Division 2 Norra 1928–29	IFK Västerås	2nd team
Division 2 Mellansvenska Serien 1927–28	Division 2 Norra 1928–29	IK City	3rd team
Division 2 Mellansvenska Serien 1927–28	Division 2 Norra 1928–29	Surahammars IF	4th team
Division 2 Östsvenska Serien 1927–28	Division 2 Norra 1928–29	Sundbybergs IK	2nd team
Division 2 Östsvenska Serien 1927–28	Division 2 Norra 1928–29	Hammarby IF	3rd team
Division 2 Östsvenska Serien 1927–28	Division 2 Norra 1928–29	IFK Stockholm	4th team
Division 2 Västsvenska Serien 1927–28	Division 2 Södra 1928–29	Redbergslids IK	Winners
Division 2 Västsvenska Serien 1927–28	Division 2 Södra 1928–29	IFK Uddevalla	2nd team
Division 2 Västsvenska Serien 1927–28	Division 2 Södra 1928–29	Jonsereds IF	3rd team
Division 2 Västsvenska Serien 1927–28	Division 2 Södra 1928–29	Fässbergs IF	4th team
Division 2 Västsvenska Serien 1927–28	Division 2 Södra 1928–29	Krokslätts FF	5th team
Division 2 Sydsvenska Serien 1927–28	Division 2 Södra 1928–29	Kalmar FF	2nd team
Division 2 Sydsvenska Serien 1927–28	Division 2 Södra 1928–29	Malmö FF	3rd team
Division 2 Sydsvenska Serien 1927–28	Division 2 Södra 1928–29	Halmstads BK	4th team
Division 2 Sydsvenska Serien 1927–28	Division 2 Södra 1928–29	IS Halmia	5th team

=== Relegations ===
Relegated from	Relegated to	Team	Reason
Allsvenskan 1927–28	Division 2 Norra 1928–29	Djurgårdens IF	11th team
Allsvenskan 1927–28	Division 2 Södra 1928–29	Stattena IF	12th team
Division 2 Uppsvenska Serien 1927–28	Division 3 1928–29	Sandvikens AIK	3rd team
Division 2 Uppsvenska Serien 1927–28	Division 3 1928–29	Söderhamns Skärgårds IF	4th team
Division 2 Uppsvenska Serien 1927–28	Division 3 1928–29	IK Brage	5th team
Division 2 Uppsvenska Serien 1927–28	Division 3 1928–29	Brynäs IF	6th team
Division 2 Uppsvenska Serien 1927–28	Division 3 1928–29	IK Sirius	7th team
Division 2 Uppsvenska Serien 1927–28	Division 3 1928–29	Kvarnsvedens GIF	8th team
Division 2 Uppsvenska Serien 1927–28	Division 3 1928–29	Skutskärs IF	9th team
Division 2 Mellansvenska Serien 1927–28	Division 3 1928–29	Örebro SK	5th team
Division 2 Mellansvenska Serien 1927–28	Division 3 1928–29	Katrineholms AIK	6th team
Division 2 Mellansvenska Serien 1927–28	Division 3 1928–29	Köpings IS	7th team
Division 2 Mellansvenska Serien 1927–28	Division 3 1928–29	Katrineholms SK	8th team
Division 2 Mellansvenska Serien 1927–28	Division 3 1928–29	Västerås IK	9th team
Division 2 Mellansvenska Serien 1927–28	Division 3 1928–29	IFK Arboga	10th team
Division 2 Östsvenska Serien 1927–28	Division 3 1928–29	BK Derby	5th team
Division 2 Östsvenska Serien 1927–28	Division 3 1928–29	Reymersholms IK	6th team
Division 2 Östsvenska Serien 1927–28	Division 3 1928–29	IF Linnéa	7th team
Division 2 Östsvenska Serien 1927–28	Division 3 1928–29	Huvudsta IS	8th team
Division 2 Östsvenska Serien 1927–28	Division 3 1928–29	IF Vesta	9th team
Division 2 Västsvenska Serien 1927–28	Division 3 1928–29	Skara IF	6th team
Division 2 Västsvenska Serien 1927–28	Division 3 1928–29	Majornas IK	7th team
Division 2 Västsvenska Serien 1927–28	Division 3 1928–29	IF Heimer	8th team
Division 2 Västsvenska Serien 1927–28	Division 3 1928–29	Uddevalla IS	9th team
Division 2 Västsvenska Serien 1927–28	Division 3 1928–29	Trollhättans IF	10th team
Division 2 Västsvenska Serien 1927–28	Division 3 1928–29	IFK Borås	11th team
Division 2 Västsvenska Serien 1927–28	Unknown	IFK Åmål	12th team
Division 2 Sydsvenska Serien 1927–28	Division 3 1928–29	Varbergs BoIS	6th team
Division 2 Sydsvenska Serien 1927–28	Division 3 1928–29	Varbergs GIF	7th team
Division 2 Sydsvenska Serien 1927–28	Division 3 1928–29	Malmö BI	8th team
Division 2 Sydsvenska Serien 1927–28	Division 3 1928–29	IFK Helsingborg	9th team
Division 2 Sydsvenska Serien 1927–28	Division 3 1928–29	IFK Kristianstad	10th team
Division 2 Sydsvenska Serien 1927–28	Division 3 1928–29	Landskrona IF	11th team

== Domestic results ==
=== Allsvenskan 1927–28 ===

	Team	Pld	W	D	L	GF		GA	GD	Pts
1	Örgryte IS	22	14	5	3	69	–	29	+40	33
2	Helsingborgs IF	22	14	5	3	64	–	27	+37	33
3	GAIS	22	11	6	5	45	–	29	+16	28
4	IFK Göteborg	22	10	6	6	39	–	33	+6	26
5	IF Elfsborg	22	10	3	9	48	–	35	+13	23
6	IK Sleipner	22	8	5	9	50	–	44	+6	21
7	AIK	22	8	4	10	49	–	47	+2	20
8	IFK Norrköping	22	6	7	9	36	–	63	-27	19
9	Landskrona BoIS	22	8	2	12	49	–	52	-3	18
10	IFK Eskilstuna	22	7	4	11	42	–	65	-23	18
11	Djurgårdens IF	22	4	6	12	43	–	66	-23	14
12	Stattena IF	22	5	1	16	30	–	74	-44	11

=== Allsvenskan promotion play-off 1927–28 ===
10 June 1928

Westermalms IF	2–2	Hallstahammars SK

?, Stockholm
17 June 1928

Hallstahammars SK	1–2	Westermalms IF

?, Hallstahammar

10 June 1928

Redbergslids IK	4–0	IFK Malmö

?, Gothenburg
17 June 1928

IFK Malmö	3–1	Redbergslids IK

?, Malmö
1 July 1928

Redbergslids IK	1–3	IFK Malmö

?, Stockholm

=== Division 2 Uppsvenska Serien 1927–28 ===

	Team	Pld	W	D	L	GF		GA	GD	Pts
1	Sandvikens IF	16	14	2	0	74	–	18	+56	30
2	Gefle IF	16	9	3	4	51	–	35	+16	21
3	Sandvikens AIK	16	9	2	5	61	–	39	+20	20
4	Söderhamns Skärgårds IF	16	7	4	5	50	–	48	+2	18
5	IK Brage	16	6	4	6	44	–	50	-6	16
6	Brynäs IF	16	6	2	8	40	–	42	-2	14
7	IK Sirius	16	4	2	10	32	–	69	-37	10
8	Kvarnsvedens GIF	16	3	2	11	26	–	55	-29	8
9	Skutskärs IF	16	3	1	12	24	–	46	-22	7

=== Division 2 Mellansvenska Serien 1927–28 ===
	Team	Pld	W	D	L	GF		GA	GD	Pts
1	Hallstahammars SK	18	11	5	2	50	–	23	+27	27
2	IFK Västerås	18	10	5	3	59	–	29	+30	25
3	IK City	18	10	3	5	38	–	26	+12	23
4	Surahammars IF	18	7	4	7	39	–	33	+6	18
5	Örebro SK	18	7	4	7	30	–	38	-8	18
6	Katrineholms AIK	18	7	3	8	37	–	49	-12	17
7	Köpings IS	18	4	7	7	18	–	27	-9	15
8	Katrineholms SK	18	4	6	8	28	–	35	-7	14
9	Västerås IK	18	6	1	11	27	–	42	-15	13
10	IFK Arboga	18	3	4	11	27	–	51	-24	10

=== Division 2 Östsvenska Serien 1927–28 ===
	Team	Pld	W	D	L	GF		GA	GD	Pts
1	Westermalms IF	16	12	2	2	49	–	18	+31	26
2	Sundbybergs IK	16	9	5	2	38	–	23	+15	23
3	Hammarby IF	16	9	4	3	34	–	25	+9	22
4	IFK Stockholm	16	6	4	6	44	–	40	+4	16
5	BK Derby	16	5	4	7	30	–	31	-1	14
6	Reymersholms IK	16	6	1	9	34	–	41	-7	13
7	IF Linnéa	16	5	2	9	27	–	35	-8	12
8	Huvudsta IS	16	5	2	9	18	–	34	-16	12
9	IF Vesta	16	3	0	13	22	–	49	-27	6

=== Division 2 Västsvenska Serien 1927–28 ===
	Team	Pld	W	D	L	GF		GA	GD	Pts
1	Redbergslids IK	22	18	0	4	77	–	30	+47	36
2	IFK Uddevalla	22	13	4	5	54	–	33	+21	30
3	Jonsereds IF	22	13	3	6	64	–	36	+28	29
4	Fässbergs IF	22	12	3	7	54	–	35	+19	27
5	Krokslätts FF	22	11	3	8	58	–	47	+11	25
6	Skara IF	22	10	3	9	37	–	39	-2	23
7	Majornas IK	22	9	2	11	54	–	42	+12	20
8	IF Heimer	22	8	3	11	48	–	52	-4	19
9	Uddevalla IS	22	7	3	12	33	–	51	-18	17
10	Trollhättans IF	22	7	0	15	42	–	64	-22	14
11	IFK Borås	22	3	6	13	31	–	65	-34	12
12	IFK Åmål	22	4	4	14	31	–	86	-55	12

=== Division 2 Sydsvenska Serien 1927–28 ===
	Team	Pld	W	D	L	GF		GA	GD	Pts
1	IFK Malmö	20	16	4	0	66	–	16	+50	36
2	Kalmar FF	20	12	2	6	57	–	37	+20	26
3	Malmö FF	20	11	4	5	63	–	44	+19	26
4	Halmstads BK	20	9	4	7	47	–	37	+10	22
5	IS Halmia	20	8	2	10	36	–	47	-11	18
6	Varbergs BoIS	20	7	3	10	36	–	51	-15	17
7	Varbergs GIF	20	7	3	10	33	–	58	-25	17
8	Malmö BI	20	7	2	11	40	–	48	-8	16
9	IFK Helsingborg	20	7	1	12	48	–	56	-8	15
10	IFK Kristianstad	20	6	3	11	44	–	58	-14	15
11	Landskrona IF	20	4	4	12	37	–	55	-18	12

=== Norrländska Mästerskapet 1928 ===
Final

August 19, 1928

Bodens BK	2–1	GIF Sundsvall

?, Boden

== National team results ==
September 4, 1927
Friendly
№ 128

Sweden	7–0	Belgium
Kroon 27', 81'; Kaufeldt 43', 80'; Brommesson 50'; Persson 71'; Holmberg 82'

Stockholms Stadion, Stockholm
Attendance: 18,558
Referee: Hansen (Denmark)

Sweden: Sigfrid Lindberg - Axel Alfredsson, Douglas Krook - Henning Helgesson, John Persson, Torsten Johansson - Charles Brommesson, Sven Rydell, Per Kaufeldt, Carl-Erik Holmberg, Knut Kroon.

November 6, 1927
Friendly
№ 129

Switzerland	2–2	Sweden
Ramseyer 20' (p); Abegglen 26'		Rydell 21'; Kroon 33'

Letzigrund, Zürich
Attendance: 17,840
Referee: Braun (Austria)

Sweden: Sigfrid Lindberg - Axel Alfredsson, Gunnar Zacharoff - Åke Hansson, Gunnar Holmberg, Verner Andersson - Charles Brommesson, Sven Rydell, Carl-Erik Holmberg, Filip Johansson, Knut Kroon.

November 13, 1927
Friendly
№ 130

Netherlands	1–0	Sweden
Ghering 83'

Oude Stadion, Amsterdam
Attendance: 30,000
Referee: Kingscott (England)

Sweden: Sigfrid Lindberg - Axel Alfredsson, Gunnar Zacharoff - Henning Helgesson, Gunnar Holmberg, Verner Andersson - Charles Brommesson, Sven Rydell, Carl-Erik Holmberg, Filip Johansson, Knut Kroon.

June 7, 1928
1924–28 Nordic Championship
№ 131

Sweden	6–1	Norway
Keller 15', 70'; Lundahl 22', 57'; Kroon 28', 76'		Helgesen 55'

Stockholms Stadion, Stockholm
Attendance: 19,000
Referee: Remke (Denmark)

Sweden: Anders Rydberg - Herbert Lundgren, Gunnar Zacharoff - Henning Helgesson, Sven Friberg, Nils Nilsson - Heinrich Brost, Sven Rydell, Harry Lundahl, Tore Keller, Knut Kroon.

July 1, 1928
Friendly
№ 132

Poland	2–1	Sweden
Staliński 26'; Kuchar 70'		Persson 10'

Stadion 1, Katowice
Attendance: 17,000
Referee: Bauwens (Germany)

Sweden: Einar Jonasson - Knut Bergqvist, Yngve Forsblom - Erik Hedihn, Thure Svensson, Einar Snitt - Ernst Lööf, Ragnar Jacobsson, Ejnar Persson, John Kling, Bertil Pettersson.

July 6, 1928
Friendly
№ 133

Latvia	0–4	Sweden
		Lööf 14', 16', 35'; Pettersson 25'

LSB Stadions, Riga
Attendance: 5,000
Referee: Tomaschky (Germany)

Sweden: Einar Jonasson - Knut Bergqvist, Yngve Forsblom - Hugo Eliasson, Thure Svensson, Einar Snitt - Ernst Lööf, John Kling, Ejnar Persson, Bror Ljunggren, Bertil Pettersson.

July 9, 1928
Friendly
№ 134

Estonia	0–1	Sweden
		Pettersson 81'

Kadriorg Stadium, Tallinn
Attendance: 4,500
Referee: Aalto (Finland)

Sweden: Einar Jonasson - Knut Bergqvist, Yngve Forsblom - Hugo Eliasson, Thure Svensson, Einar Snitt - Ernst Lööf, John Kling, Ejnar Persson, Bror Ljunggren, Bertil Pettersson.

July 29, 1928
Friendly
№ 135

Sweden	2–3	Austria
Lundahl 17', 22'		Gschweidl 25'; Smistik 38'; Seidl 73'

Stockholms Stadion, Stockholm
Attendance: 17,000
Referee: Andersen (Denmark)

Sweden: Anders Rydberg - Axel Alfredsson, Gunnar Zacharoff - Henning Helgesson, Sven Friberg, Torsten Johansson - Ernst Lööf, Sven Rydell, Harry Lundahl, Tore Keller, Gösta Dunker.

== National team players in season 1927/28 ==
name	pos.	caps	goals	club
Axel "Massa" Alfredsson	DF	4	0	Hälsingborgs IF
Verner "Mickel" Andersson	MF	2	0	IFK Göteborg
Knut Bergqvist	DF	3	0	IF Elfsborg
Charles "Bromme" Brommesson	FW	3	1	Hälsingborgs IF
Heinrich "Hanke" Brost	FW	1	0	IFK Malmö
Gösta Dunker	FW	1	0	Sandvikens IF
Hugo Eliasson	MF	2	0	Sandvikens IF
Yngve Forsblom	DF	3	0	Sandvikens AIK
Sven Friberg	MF	2	0	Örgryte IS
Åke Hansson	MF	1	0	IFK Göteborg
Erik Hedihn	MF	1	0	IF Elfsborg
Henning "Charmören" Helgesson	MF	4	0	Örgryte IS
Carl-Erik "Slana" Holmberg	FW	3	1	Örgryte IS
Gunnar "Bajadären" Holmberg	MF	2	0	GAIS
Ragnar "Bob" Jacobsson	FW	1	0	Sandvikens IF
Filip "Svarte Filip" Johansson	FW	2	0	IFK Göteborg
Torsten Johansson	MF	2	0	IFK Norrköping
Einar Jonasson	GK	3	0	IF Elfsborg
Per "Pära" Kaufeldt	FW	1	2	AIK
Tore Keller	FW	2	2	IK Sleipner
John Kling	FW	3	0	Sandvikens IF
Douglas "Världens bäste" Krook	DF	1	0	Örgryte IS
Knut "Knutte" Kroon	FW	4	5	Hälsingborgs IF
Sigfrid "Sigge" Lindberg	GK	3	0	Hälsingborgs IF
Bror Ljunggren	FW	2	0	IF Elfsborg
Ernst Lööf	FW	4	3	Sandvikens AIK
Harry Lundahl	FW	2	4	Hälsingborgs IF
Herbert Lundgren	DF	1	0	GAIS
Nils "Gävle" Nilsson	MF	1	0	AIK
Ejnar Persson	FW	3	1	Sandvikens IF
John "Broarn" Persson	MF	1	1	AIK
Bertil Pettersson	FW	3	2	Gefle IF
Anders Rydberg	GK	2	0	IFK Göteborg
Sven "Trollgubben" Rydell	FW	5	1	Örgryte IS
Einar Snitt	MF	3	0	Sandvikens IF
Thure "Kusken" Svensson	MF	3	0	Gefle IF
Gunnar Zacharoff (Zackaroff)	DF	4	0	GAIS
