= 1925–26 in Swedish football =

The 1925–26 season in Swedish football, starting August 1925 and ending July 1926:

== Honours ==
=== Official titles ===
Title	Team	Reason
1925 Swedish Champions	Brynäs IF	Winners of Svenska Mästerskapet

=== Competitions ===
Level	Competition	Team
1st level	Allsvenskan 1925–26	Örgryte IS
2nd level	Division 2 Uppsvenska Serien 1925–26	Sandvikens IF
2nd level	Division 2 Mellansvenska Serien 1925–26	Örebro SK
2nd level	Division 2 Östsvenska Serien 1925–26	Westermalms IF
2nd level	Division 2 Västsvenska Serien 1925–26	IF Elfsborg
2nd level	Division 2 Sydsvenska Serien 1925–26	Halmstads BK
Championship Cup	Svenska Mästerskapet 1925	Brynäs IF
Regional Championship	Norrländska Mästerskapet 1926	Bodens BK

== Promotions, relegations and qualifications ==
=== Promotions ===
Promoted from	Promoted to	Team	Reason
Division 2 Östsvenska Serien 1925–26	Allsvenskan 1926–27	Westermalms IF	Winners of promotion play-off
Division 2 Västsvenska Serien 1925–26	Allsvenskan 1926–27	IF Elfsborg	Winners of promotion play-off
Unknown	Division 2 Uppsvenska Serien 1926–27	IK Brage	Unknown
Unknown	Division 2 Mellansvenska Serien 1926–27	IFK Arboga	Unknown
Unknown	Division 2 Mellansvenska Serien 1926–27	Kolbäcks AIF	Unknown
Unknown	Division 2 Mellansvenska Serien 1926–27	Surahammars IF	Unknown
Unknown	Division 2 Östsvenska Serien 1926–27	BK Derby	Unknown
Unknown	Division 2 Östsvenska Serien 1926–27	Huvudsta IS	Unknown
Unknown	Division 2 Västsvenska Serien 1926–27	Majornas IK	Unknown
Unknown	Division 2 Västsvenska Serien 1926–27	IK Ymer	Unknown
Unknown	Division 2 Sydsvenska Serien 1926–27	Ängelholms IF	Unknown

=== League transfers ===
Transferred from	Transferred to	Team	Reason
Division 2 Östsvenska Serien 1925–26	Division 2 Uppsvenska Serien 1926–27	IK Sirius	Unknown

=== Relegations ===
Relegated from	Relegated to	Team	Reason
Allsvenskan 1925–26	Division 2 Sydsvenska Serien 1926–27	IFK Malmö	11th team
Allsvenskan 1925–26	Division 2 Mellansvenska Serien 1926–27	IK City	12th team
Division 2 Uppsvenska Serien 1925–26	Unknown	Domnarvets GIF	7th team
Division 2 Uppsvenska Serien 1925–26	Unknown	Falu IF	8th team
Division 2 Mellansvenska Serien 1925–26	Unknown	Örebro IK	9th team
Division 2 Mellansvenska Serien 1925–26	Unknown	IFK Örebro	10th team
Division 2 Östsvenska Serien 1925–26	Unknown	Tranebergs IF	11th team
Division 2 Sydsvenska Serien 1925–26	Unknown	Falkenbergs GIK	9th team

== Domestic results ==
=== Allsvenskan 1925–26 ===

	Team	Pld	W	D	L	GF		GA	GD	Pts
1	Örgryte IS	22	15	5	2	75	–	33	+42	35
2	GAIS	22	16	2	4	67	–	20	+47	34
3	IFK Göteborg	22	13	7	2	65	–	27	+38	33
4	Helsingborgs IF	22	15	2	5	75	–	36	+39	32
5	AIK	22	7	7	8	45	–	50	-5	21
6	IFK Norrköping	22	9	2	11	47	–	57	-10	20
7	Landskrona BoIS	22	7	4	11	56	–	67	-11	18
8	IK Sleipner	22	8	2	12	40	–	52	-12	18
9	IFK Eskilstuna	22	6	5	11	40	–	63	-23	17
10	IFK Uddevalla	22	4	8	10	31	–	49	-18	16
11	IFK Malmö	22	4	6	12	30	–	66	-36	14
12	IK City	22	1	4	17	32	–	83	-51	6

=== Allsvenskan promotion play-off 1925–26 ===
13 June 1926

Örebro SK	2–2	Westermalms IF

?, Örebro
20 June 1926

Westermalms IF	4–0	Örebro SK

?, Stockholm

20 June 1926

Halmstads BK	3–1	IF Elfsborg

?, Halmstad
27 June 1926

IF Elfsborg	4–2	Halmstads BK

?, Borås
4 July 1926

Halmstads BK	2–4	IF Elfsborg

?, Gothenburg

=== Division 2 Uppsvenska Serien 1925–26 ===

	Team	Pld	W	D	L	GF		GA	GD	Pts
1	Sandvikens IF	14	12	1	1	60	–	16	+44	25
2	Gefle IF	14	8	2	4	50	–	29	+21	18
3	Brynäs IF	14	7	4	3	52	–	34	+18	18
4	Skutskärs IF	14	8	1	5	51	–	32	+19	17
5	Sandvikens AIK	14	7	2	5	36	–	25	+11	16
6	Kvarnsvedens IF	14	2	3	9	24	–	51	-27	7
7	Domnarvets GIF	14	3	1	10	19	–	56	-37	7
8	Falu IK	14	2	0	12	19	–	68	-49	4

=== Division 2 Mellansvenska Serien 1925–26 ===
	Team	Pld	W	D	L	GF		GA	GD	Pts
1	Örebro SK	18	11	3	4	42	–	39	+3	25
2	Hallstahammars SK	18	9	3	6	42	–	31	+11	21
3	Västerås IK	18	9	2	7	42	–	32	+10	20
4	IFK Västerås	18	9	2	7	49	–	43	+6	20
5	Köpings IS	18	7	5	6	37	–	29	+8	19
6	Västerås SK	18	9	1	8	39	–	33	+6	19
7	Katrineholms AIK	18	7	5	6	34	–	30	+4	19
8	Katrineholms SK	18	8	3	8	30	–	30	0	19
9	Örebro IK	18	4	4	10	34	–	49	-15	12
10	IFK Örebro	18	2	2	14	29	–	59	-30	6

=== Division 2 Östsvenska Serien 1925–26 ===
	Team	Pld	W	D	L	GF		GA	GD	Pts
1	Westermalms IF	20	15	3	2	71	–	17	+54	33
2	Sundbybergs IK	20	13	3	4	53	–	29	+24	29
3	Djurgårdens IF	20	11	5	4	60	–	28	+32	27
4	IF Linnéa	20	10	3	7	43	–	45	-2	23
5	IFK Stockholm	20	8	5	7	41	–	44	-3	21
6	Hammarby IF	20	9	2	9	39	–	28	+11	20
7	Reymersholms IK	20	7	4	9	30	–	32	-2	18
8	Mariebergs IK	20	5	7	8	40	–	45	-5	17
9	Stockholms BK	20	6	2	12	30	–	52	-22	14
10	IK Sirius	20	5	2	13	38	–	65	-27	12
11	Tranebergs IF	20	2	2	16	14	–	74	-60	6

=== Division 2 Västsvenska Serien 1925–26 ===
	Team	Pld	W	D	L	GF		GA	GD	Pts
1	IF Elfsborg	16	10	1	5	54	–	25	+29	21
2	Vänersborgs IF	16	9	3	4	32	–	30	+2	21
3	Jonsereds IF	16	7	4	5	30	–	26	+4	18
4	Fässbergs IF	16	7	2	7	36	–	31	+5	16
5	Krokslätts FF	16	5	6	5	26	–	26	0	16
6	Skara IF	16	6	3	7	27	–	33	-6	15
7	Trollhättans IF	16	6	2	8	28	–	36	-8	14
8	Uddevalla IS	16	5	2	9	26	–	38	-12	12
9	IF Heimer	16	5	1	10	35	–	48	-13	11

=== Division 2 Sydsvenska Serien 1925–26 ===
	Team	Pld	W	D	L	GF		GA	GD	Pts
1	Halmstads BK	16	8	6	2	35	–	19	+16	22
2	Stattena IF	16	7	5	4	25	–	20	+5	19
3	Malmö FF	16	5	8	3	44	–	24	+20	18
4	Malmö BI	16	7	4	5	37	–	23	+14	18
5	IFK Helsingborg	16	8	2	6	32	–	22	+10	18
6	IS Halmia	16	7	2	7	28	–	23	+5	16
7	Lunds BK	16	6	3	7	24	–	31	-7	15
8	Varbergs GIF	16	4	4	8	18	–	30	-12	12
9	Falkenbergs GIK	16	2	2	12	11	–	62	-51	6

=== Svenska Mästerskapet 1925 ===
Final

August 2, 1925

Brynäs IF	4–2	BK Derby

Strömvallen, Gävle

=== Norrländska Mästerskapet 1926 ===
Final

July 18, 1926

IFK Östersund	0–2	Bodens BK

?, Östersund

== National team results ==
August 23, 1925
1924–28 Nordic Championship
№ 108

Norway	3–7	Sweden
Berstad 3', 34'; Lunde 68'		Rydell 22', 42', 44', 62'; Kaufeldt 30', 89'; Haglund 71'

Gressbanen, Oslo
Attendance: 15,000
Referee: Andersen (Denmark)

Sweden: Sigfrid Lindberg - Axel Alfredsson, Douglas Krook - Henning Helgesson, Sven Friberg, Ivar Klingström - Algot Haglund, Sven Rydell, Per Kaufeldt, Filip Johansson, Rudolf Kock.

November 1, 1925
Friendly
№ 109

Poland	2–6	Sweden
Sperling 15'; Kuchar 62'		Dahl 7', 9'; Johansson 25', 28', 30'; Rydberg 40'

Stadion Cracovii, Kraków
Attendance: 9,000
Referee: Cejnar (Czechoslovakia)

Sweden: Sigfrid Lindberg - Axel Alfredsson, Hugo Carlsson - Verner Andersson, Arthur Bengtsson, Erik Andersson - Rune Wenzel, Gunnar Rydberg, Filip Johansson, Albin Dahl, Knut Kroon.

June 9, 1926
1924–28 Nordic Championship
№ 110

Sweden	3–2	Norway
Kaufeldt 31'; Rydell 60', 69'		Andersen 19'; Gundersen 26'

Stockholms Stadion, Stockholm
Attendance: 13,500
Referee: Cejnar (Czechoslovakia)

Sweden: Sigfrid Lindberg - Axel Alfredsson, Martin Persson - Sven Lindqvist, John Persson, Nils Nilsson - Algot Haglund, Sven Rydell, Per Kaufeldt, Tore Keller, Bertil Appelskog.

June 13, 1926
Friendly
№ 111

Sweden	2–2	Czechoslovakia
Kaufeldt 75'; Holmberg 89'		Novák 48', 78'

Stockholms Stadion, Stockholm
Attendance: 15,000
Referee: Andersen (Denmark)

Sweden: Robert Zander - Herbert Lundgren, Douglas Krook - Henning Helgesson, Sven Friberg, Verner Andersson - Rune Wenzel, Sven Rydell, Per Kaufeldt, Carl-Erik Holmberg, Harry Rosenlind.

June 20, 1926
Friendly
№ 112

Germany	3–3	Sweden
Harder 21', 35', 43'		Hallbäck 26', 82'; Olsson 34'

Zerzabelshof, Nuremberg
Attendance: 25,000
Referee: Andersen (Denmark)

Sweden: Sigfrid Lindberg - Axel Alfredsson, Otto Carlsson - Carl Wijk (46' Torsten Johansson), Nils Rosén, Erik Andersson - Algot Haglund, Gunnar Olsson, Heinrich Brost, Albin Hallbäck, Knut Kroon.

July 3, 1926
Friendly
№ 113

Czechoslovakia	4–2	Sweden
Mareš 19'; Jelínek 25'; Novák 53'; Meduna 63'		Holmberg 44'; Johansson 87'

Letenský Stadion, Prague
Attendance: 17,000
Referee: Braun (Austria)

Sweden: Robert Zander ( Manfred Johnsson) - Herbert Lundgren, Douglas Krook - Henning Helgesson, Gunnar Holmberg, Otto Carlsson - Rune Wenzel, Sven Rydell, Filip Johansson, Carl-Erik Holmberg, Thorsten Svensson.

July 18, 1926
Friendly
№ 114

Sweden	5–3	Italy
Rydberg 2'; Holmberg 5'; Kroon 21'; Johansson 64', 89' (p)		Levratto 33', 81'; Cevenini 74'

Stockholms Stadion, Stockholm
Attendance: 12,000
Referee: Hansen (Denmark)

Sweden: Sigfrid Lindberg - Herbert Lundgren, Douglas Krook - Henning Helgesson, Sven Friberg, Verner Andersson - Rune Wenzel, Gunnar Rydberg, Filip Johansson, Carl-Erik Holmberg, Knut Kroon.

July 20, 1926
Friendly
№ 115

Latvia	4–1	Sweden
Strazdiņš 6'; Šeibelis 41' (p); Tauriņš 47'; Pavlovs 65'		Hedström 3'

Armee Sportplatz, Riga
Attendance: 6,000
Referee: MacKibbin (England)

Sweden: Knut Norrby - Henry Åström, Ingvar Persson - Hugo Eliasson, Thure Svensson, Einar Snitt - Ernst Lööf, John Sand, John Sundberg, Axel Hedström, Gösta Pettersson.

July 23, 1926
Friendly
№ 116

Estonia	1–7	Sweden
Räästas 81'		Kling 1', 17', 73'; Hedström 3', 31'; Lööf 33', 68'

Kadriorg Stadium, Tallinn
Attendance: 6,000
Referee: Krūmiņš (Latvia)

Sweden: Knut Norrby - Henry Åström, Ingvar Persson - Hugo Eliasson, Thure Svensson, Einar Snitt - Ernst Lööf, John Kling, John Sundberg, Axel Hedström, Gösta Pettersson.

July 26, 1926
Friendly
№ 117

Finland	2–3	Sweden
Kanerva 5'; Saario 29'		Hedström 62', 82'; Sundberg 84'

Tölö bollplan, Helsinki
Attendance: 4,000
Referee: Bauwens (Germany)

Sweden: Knut Norrby - Henry Åström, Ingvar Persson - Hugo Eliasson, Thure Svensson, Oskar Björk - Ernst Lööf, John Kling, John Sundberg, Axel Hedström, Gösta Pettersson.

== National team players in season 1925/26 ==
name	pos.	caps	goals	club
Axel "Massa" Alfredsson	DF	4	0	Hälsingborgs IF
Erik "Mickel" Andersson	MF	2	0	IFK Göteborg
Verner "Mickel" Andersson	MF	3	0	IFK Göteborg
Bertil "Bebbe" Appelskog	FW	1	0	IK Sleipner
Henry Åström	DF	3	0	Gefle IF
Arthur Bengtsson	MF	1	0	IFK Göteborg
Oskar Björk	MF	1	0	Gefle IF
Heinrich "Hanke" Brost	FW	1	0	IFK Malmö
Hugo Carlsson	DF	1	0	Hälsingborgs IF
Otto Carlsson	MF/DF	2	0	IFK Malmö
Albin Dahl	FW	1	2	Hälsingborgs IF
Hugo Eliasson	MF	3	0	Sandvikens IF
Sven Friberg	MF	3	0	Örgryte IS
Algot "Agge" Haglund	FW	3	1	Djurgårdens IF
Albin "Spjass" Hallbäck	FW	1	2	Malmö BI
Axel Hedström	FW	3	5	Brynäs IF
Henning "Charmören" Helgesson	MF	4	0	Örgryte IS
Carl-Erik "Slana" Holmberg	FW	3	3	Örgryte IS
Gunnar "Bajadären" Holmberg	MF	1	0	GAIS
Filip "Svarte Filip" Johansson	FW	4	6	IFK Göteborg
Torsten Johansson	MF	1	0	IFK Norrköping
Manfred Johnsson	GK	1	0	GAIS
Per "Pära" Kaufeldt	FW	3	4	AIK
Tore Keller	FW	1	0	IK Sleipner
John Kling	FW	2	3	Sandvikens IF
Ivar "Klinga" Klingström	MF	1	0	Örgryte IS
Rudolf "Putte" Kock	FW	1	0	AIK
Douglas "Världens bäste" Krook	DF	4	0	Örgryte IS
Knut "Knutte" Kroon	FW	3	1	Hälsingborgs IF
Sigfrid "Sigge" Lindberg	GK	5	0	Hälsingborgs IF
Sven "Linkan" Lindqvist	MF	1	0	AIK
Ernst Lööf	FW	3	2	Sandvikens AIK
Herbert Lundgren	DF	3	0	GAIS
Nils "Gävle" Nilsson	MF	1	0	AIK
Knut Norrby	GK	3	0	Gefle IF
Gunnar "Lill-Gunnar" Olsson	FW	1	1	Hälsingborgs IF
Ingvar Persson	DF	3	0	Sandvikens IF
John "Broarn" Persson	MF	1	0	AIK
Martin "Luttan" Persson	DF	1	0	IFK Stockholm
Gösta "Göken" Pettersson	FW	3	0	Gefle IF
Nils "Rossi" Rosén	MF	1	0	Hälsingborgs IF
Harry "Roas" Rosenlind	FW	1	0	IFK Eskilstuna
Gunnar "Lillen" Rydberg	FW	2	2	IFK Göteborg
Sven "Trollgubben" Rydell	FW	4	6	Örgryte IS
John Sand	FW	1	0	Gefle IF
Einar Snitt	MF	2	0	Sandvikens IF
John Sundberg	FW	3	1	Sandvikens AIK
Thorsten Svensson	FW	1	0	GAIS
Thure "Kusken" Svensson	MF	3	0	Gefle IF
Rune Wenzel	FW	4	0	GAIS
Carl Wijk	MF	1	0	IFK Malmö
Robert Zander	GK	2	0	Örgryte IS
