= 1930–31 in Swedish football =

The 1930-31 season in Swedish football, starting August 1930 and ending July 1931:

== Honours ==
=== Official titles ===
Title	Team	Reason
1930–31 Swedish Champions	GAIS	Winners of Allsvenskan

=== Competitions ===
Level	Competition	Team
1st level	Allsvenskan 1930–31	GAIS
2nd level	Division 2 Norra 1930–31	Hallstahammars SK
2nd level	Division 2 Södra 1930–31	Malmö FF

== Promotions, relegations and qualifications ==
=== Promotions ===
Promoted from	Promoted to	Team	Reason
Division 2 Norra 1930–31	Allsvenskan 1931–32	Hallstahammars SK	Winners
Division 2 Södra 1930–31	Allsvenskan 1931–32	Malmö FF	Winners
Division 3 1930–31	Division 2 Norra 1931–32	IFK Kumla	Winners of promotion play-off
Division 3 1930–31	Division 2 Norra 1931–32	Skärgårdens IF	Winners of promotion play-off
Division 3 1930–31	Division 2 Södra 1931–32	Höganäs BK	Winners of promotion play-off
Division 3 1930–31	Division 2 Södra 1931–32	Mjölby AI	Winners of promotion play-off

=== Relegations ===
Relegated from	Relegated to	Team	Reason
Allsvenskan 1930–31	Division 8 1931–32	Redbergslids IK	11th team/excluded
Allsvenskan 1930–31	Division 2 Norra 1931–32	Sandvikens IF	12th team
Division 2 Norra 1930–31	Division 3 1931–32	IK City	10th team
Division 2 Norra 1930–31	Division 3 1931–32	Mariehofs IF	11th team
Division 2 Södra 1930–31	Division 3 1931–32	Kalmar AIK	9th team
Division 2 Södra 1930–31	Division 3 1931–32	Kalmar FF	10th team

== Domestic results ==
=== Allsvenskan 1930–31 ===

	Team	Pld	W	D	L	GF		GA	GD	Pts
1	GAIS	22	16	4	2	70	–	34	+36	36
2	AIK	22	12	6	4	67	–	41	+26	30
3	IFK Göteborg	22	13	4	5	45	–	31	+14	30
4	Helsingborgs IF	22	12	2	8	55	–	43	+12	26
5	Landskrona BoIS	22	11	1	10	47	–	49	-2	23
6	IFK Malmö	22	9	4	9	42	–	55	-13	22
7	Örgryte IS	22	8	5	9	45	–	46	-1	21
8	IK Sleipner	22	7	3	12	53	–	54	-1	17
9	IFK Eskilstuna	22	6	3	13	45	–	58	-13	15
10	IF Elfsborg	22	6	3	13	39	–	59	-20	15
11	Redbergslids IK	22	5	5	12	35	–	60	-25	15
12	Sandvikens IF	22	6	2	14	39	–	52	-13	14

=== Division 2 Norra 1930–31 ===

	Team	Pld	W	D	L	GF		GA	GD	Pts
1	Hallstahammars SK	20	12	3	5	38	–	23	+15	27
2	IK Brage	20	12	3	5	52	–	34	+18	27
3	Hammarby IF	20	11	2	7	47	–	41	+6	24
4	Gefle IF	20	9	5	6	50	–	24	+26	23
5	IFK Norrköping	20	9	4	7	46	–	29	+17	22
6	Sandvikens AIK	20	9	4	7	58	–	47	+11	22
7	Surahammars IF	20	7	4	9	55	–	51	+4	18
8	IFK Västerås	20	6	6	8	34	–	42	-8	18
9	Westermalms IF	20	6	4	10	38	–	50	-12	16
10	IK City	20	7	2	11	41	–	64	-23	16
11	Mariehofs IF	20	2	3	15	28	–	82	-54	7

=== Division 2 Södra 1930–31 ===
	Team	Pld	W	D	L	GF		GA	GD	Pts
1	Malmö FF	18	11	3	4	50	–	22	+28	25
2	BK Drott	18	10	4	4	41	–	24	+17	24
3	Fässbergs IF	18	10	3	5	36	–	25	+11	23
4	IFK Kristianstad	18	9	4	5	36	–	29	+7	22
5	Halmstads BK	18	10	2	6	31	–	23	+8	22
6	IS Halmia	18	7	4	7	28	–	24	+4	18
7	BK Derby	18	6	3	9	26	–	35	-9	15
8	Stattena IF	18	4	6	8	30	–	38	-8	14
9	Kalmar AIK	18	5	1	12	24	–	43	-19	11
10	Kalmar FF	18	3	0	15	15	–	51	-36	6

=== Division 2 promotion play-off 1930–31 ===
14 June 1931

Skärgårdens IF	3–3	Djurgårdens IF

?, ?
21 June 1931

Djurgårdens IF	1–5	Skärgårdens IF

?, ?

14 June 1931

IFK Kumla	2–0	Slottsbrons IF

?, ?
21 June 1931

Slottsbrons IF	3–2	IFK Kumla

?, ?
28 June 1931

IFK Kumla	2–1	Slottsbrons IF

?, ?

14 June 1931

Höganäs BK	1–1	Krokslätts FF

?, ?
21 June 1931

Krokslätts FF	0–0	Höganäs BK

?, ?
28 June 1931

Höganäs BK	2–0	Krokslätts FF

?, ?

14 June 1931

Växjö BK	2–1	Mjölby AI

?, ?
21 June 1931

Mjölby AI	5–0	Växjö BK

?, ?
28 June 1931

Växjö BK	?–? 1–1 (2×aet)	Mjölby AI

?, ?
5 July 1931

Mjölby AI	5–1	Växjö BK

?, ?

== National team results ==
September 28, 1930
Friendly
№ 151

Sweden	0–3	Poland
		Ciszewski 39', 69'; Smoczek 43'

Stockholms Stadion, Stockholm
Attendance: 20,000
Referee: Aalto (Finland)

Sweden: Olle Bengtsson - Herbert Lundgren, Gunnar Zacharoff - Rune Carlsson, Wilhelm Petersén, Helge Liljebjörn - Rune Wenzel, Harry Dahl, Per Kaufeldt, Carl-Erik Holmberg, Evert Hansson.

September 28, 1930
Friendly
№ 152

Belgium	2–2	Sweden
Secretin 31'; Braine 39'		Dahl 41', 88'

Stade Vélodrome de Rocourt, Liège
Attendance: 17,000
Referee: Miesz (Austria)

Sweden: Sigfrid Lindberg - Axel Alfredsson, Arne Johansson - Folke Fredenlund, Nils Rosén, Erik Granath - Charles Brommesson, Gunnar Olsson, Harry Lundahl, Albin Dahl, Knut Kroon.

September 28, 1930
1929–32 Nordic Championship
№ 153

Finland	4–4	Sweden
Lehtinen 9', 40', 41'; Koponen 16'		Karlsson 26', 53', 64'; Andersson 60'

Tölö bollplan, Helsinki
Attendance: 7,152
Referee: Remke (Denmark)

Sweden: Eivar Widlund - Erik Linder, Helge Zachrisson - John Kristiansson, Torsten Lindskog, Gösta Nordström - Gösta Dunker, Åke Andersson, Bertil Karlsson, John "Tjodde" Nilsson, Axel Johansson.

November 16, 1930
Friendly
№ 154

Austria	4–1	Sweden
Gschweidl 40'; Weselik 47'; Schall 56'; Wessely 80'		Engdahl 23'

Hohe Warte, Vienna
Attendance: 12,000
Referee: Majorszky (Hungary)

Sweden: Sigfrid Lindberg - Axel Alfredsson, Arne Johansson - Folke Fredenlund, Nils Rosén, Einar Snitt - John "Jompa" Nilsson, Erik Persson, Per Kaufeldt, Ernst Wahlberg, Wilhelm Engdahl.

June 17, 1931
Friendly
№ 155

Sweden	0–0	Germany

Stockholms Stadion, Stockholm
Attendance: 16,000
Referee: Langenus (Belgium)

Sweden: Anders Rydberg - Herbert Samuelsson, Arne Johansson - Helge Liljebjörn, Nils Rosén, Ernst Andersson - John "Jompa" Nilsson, Erik Persson, Per Kaufeldt, Albin Dahl, Knut Kroon.

June 28, 1931
1929–32 Nordic Championship
№ 156

Sweden	3–1	Denmark
Gardtman 47'; Rydell 76', 88' (p)		Jørgensen 23'

Stockholms Stadion, Stockholm
Attendance: 20,000
Referee: Birlem (Germany)

Sweden: Anders Rydberg - Herbert Samuelsson, Arne Johansson - Helge Liljebjörn, Nils Rosén, Ernst Andersson - John "Jompa" Nilsson, Rolf Gardtman, Sune Zetterberg, Sven Rydell, Evert Hansson.

July 3, 1931
1929–32 Nordic Championship
№ 157

Sweden	8–2	Finland
Gardtman 12'; Zetterberg 18', 25', 30', 55'; Hansson 35', 65', 73'		Lintamo 78'; Grönlund 88' (p)

Stockholms Stadion, Stockholm
Attendance: 20,000
Referee: Remke (Denmark)

Sweden: Anders Rydberg - Herbert Samuelsson, Arne Johansson - Helge Liljebjörn, Nils Rosén, Ernst Andersson - John "Jompa" Nilsson, Rolf Gardtman, Sune Zetterberg, Sven Rydell, Evert Hansson.

July 8, 1931
Friendly
№ 158

Sweden	3–1	Estonia
Jacobsson 27'; Zetterberg 29', 70'		Ellman-Eelma 78'

Nya IP, Sandviken
Attendance: 6,000
Referee: Pekonen (Finland)

Sweden: Eivar Widlund - Axel Alfredsson, Sven Andersson - Walfrid Persson, Thure Svensson, Einar Snitt - Gösta Dunker, Ragnar Jacobsson, Sune Zetterberg, John Sundberg, Rune Eriksson.

July 26, 1931
Friendly
№ 159

Sweden	6–0	Latvia
Sundberg 10', 44', 78'; Roos 12', 25'; Rydell 38' (p)

Arosvallen, Västerås
Attendance: 8,000
Referee: Randers-Johansen (Norway)

Sweden: Martin Larsson - Gusten Berg, Nils Berggren - Rune Carlsson, Thure Svensson, Einar Snitt - Georg Johansson, Sven Rydell, John Sundberg, Hans Garpe, Sigurd Roos.

== National team players in season 1930/31 ==
name	pos.	caps	goals	club
Axel "Massa" Alfredsson	DF	3	0	AIK
Åke Andersson	FW	1	1	IFK Eskilstuna
Ernst Andersson	MF	3	0	IFK Göteborg
Sven "Vrålis" Andersson	DF	1	0	AIK
Olle Bengtsson	GK	1	0	GAIS
Gusten (Gustaf) "Gurra" Berg	DF	1	0	Hallstahammars SK
Nils Berggren	DF	1	0	Hallstahammars SK
Charles "Bromme" Brommesson	FW	1	0	Hälsingborgs IF
Rune Carlsson	MF	2	0	IFK Eskilstuna
Albin Dahl	FW	2	2	Hälsingborgs IF
Harry "Hacke" Dahl	FW	1	0	Landskrona BoIS
Gösta Dunker	FW	2	0	Sandvikens IF
Wilhelm "Ville" Engdahl	FW	1	1	AIK
Rune Eriksson	FW	1	0	Sandvikens AIK
Folke "Knopp" Fredenlund	MF	2	0	IF Elfsborg
Rolf Gardtman	FW	2	2	Redbergslids IK
Hans Garpe	FW	1	0	IFK Västerås
Erik Granath	MF	1	0	Örgryte IS
Evert "Sperling" Hansson	FW	3	3	Örgryte IS
Carl-Erik "Slana" Holmberg	FW	1	0	Örgryte IS
Ragnar "Bob" Jacobsson	FW	1	1	Sandvikens IF
Arne "Tysken" Johansson	DF	5	0	Hälsingborgs IF
Axel "Satte" Johansson	FW	1	0	Landskrona BoIS
Georg "Massa" Johansson	FW	1	0	IK Brage
Bertil Karlsson	FW	1	3	IFK Eskilstuna
Per "Pära" Kaufeldt	FW	3	0	AIK
John Kristiansson	MF	1	0	IFK Malmö
Knut "Knutte" Kroon	FW	2	0	Hälsingborgs IF
Martin Larsson	GK	1	0	Hallstahammars SK
Helge Liljebjörn	MF	4	0	GAIS
Sigfrid "Sigge" Lindberg	GK	2	0	Hälsingborgs IF
Erik Linder	DF	1	0	Landskrona BoIS
Torsten Lindskog	MF	1	0	IFK Malmö
Harry Lundahl	FW	1	0	Hälsingborgs IF
Herbert Lundgren	DF	1	0	GAIS
John "Jompa" Nilsson	FW	4	0	AIK
John "Tjodde" Nilsson	FW	1	0	Landskrona BoIS
Gösta Nordström	MF	1	0	IF Elfsborg
Gunnar "Lill-Gunnar" Olsson	FW	1	0	Hälsingborgs IF
Erik "Lillis" Persson	FW	2	0	AIK
Walfrid "Valle" Persson	MF	1	0	Sandvikens IF
Wilhelm "Mulle" Petersén	MF	1	0	AIK
Sigurd (Sigfrid) "Rosa" Roos	FW	1	2	IFK Västerås
Nils "Rossi" Rosén	MF	5	0	Hälsingborgs IF
Anders Rydberg	GK	3	0	IFK Göteborg
Sven "Trollgubben" Rydell	FW	3	3	Redbergslids IK (2); Örgryte IS (1)
Herbert Samuelsson	DF	3	0	IFK Göteborg
Einar Snitt	MF	3	0	Sandvikens IF
John Sundberg	FW	2	3	Åtvidabergs IF
Thure "Kusken" Svensson	MF	2	0	Gefle IF
Ernst "Sudden" Wahlberg	FW	1	0	AIK
Rune Wenzel	FW	1	0	GAIS
Eivar Widlund	GK	2	0	AIK
Gunnar Zacharoff (Zackaroff)	DF	1	0	GAIS
Helge Zachrisson (Zackrisson)	DF	1	0	IF Elfsborg
Sune "Skinnet" Zetterberg	FW	3	6	IK Brage
