= 1926–27 in Swedish football =

The 1926-27 season in Swedish football, starting August 1926 and ending July 1927:

== Honours ==
=== Official titles ===
Title	Team	Reason
1926–27 Swedish Champions	None	–

=== Competitions ===
Level	Competition	Team
1st level	Allsvenskan 1926–27	GAIS
2nd level	Division 2 Uppsvenska Serien 1926–27	Sandvikens IF
2nd level	Division 2 Mellansvenska Serien 1926–27	IK City
2nd level	Division 2 Östsvenska Serien 1926–27	Djurgårdens IF
2nd level	Division 2 Västsvenska Serien 1926–27	Skara IF
2nd level	Division 2 Sydsvenska Serien 1926–27	Stattena IF
Regional Championship	Norrländska Mästerskapet 1927	Söderhamns Skärgårds IF

== Promotions, relegations and qualifications ==
=== Promotions ===
Promoted from	Promoted to	Team	Reason
Division 2 Östsvenska Serien 1926–27	Allsvenskan 1927–28	Djurgårdens IF	Winners of promotion play-off
Division 2 Sydvenska Serien 1926–27	Allsvenskan 1927–28	Stattena IF	Winners of promotion play-off
Unknown	Division 2 Uppsvenska Serien 1927–28	Söderhamns Skärgårds IF	Unknown
Unknown	Division 2 Östsvenska Serien 1927–28	IF Vesta	Unknown
Unknown	Division 2 Västsvenska Serien 1927–28	IFK Borås	Unknown
Unknown	Division 2 Västsvenska Serien 1927–28	Redbergslids IK	Unknown
Unknown	Division 2 Västsvenska Serien 1927–28	IFK Åmål	Unknown
Division 3 1926–27	Division 2 Sydsvenska Serien 1927–28	Kalmar FF	Unknown
Unknown	Division 2 Sydsvenska Serien 1927–28	IFK Kristianstad	Unknown
Unknown	Division 2 Sydsvenska Serien 1927–28	Landskrona IF	Unknown
Unknown	Division 2 Sydsvenska Serien 1927–28	Varbergs BoIS	Unknown

=== Relegations ===
Relegated from	Relegated to	Team	Reason
Allsvenskan 1926–27	Division 2 Östsvenska Serien 1927–28	Westermalms IF	11th team
Allsvenskan 1926–27	Division 2 Västsvenska Serien 1927–28	IFK Uddevalla	12th team
Division 2 Mellansvenska Serien 1926–27	Division 3 1927–28	Västerås SK	11th team
Division 2 Mellansvenska Serien 1926–27	Division 3 1927–28	Kolbäcks AIF	12th team
Division 2 Östsvenska Serien 1926–27	Unknown	Mariebergs IK	9th team
Division 2 Östsvenska Serien 1926–27	Unknown	Stockholms BK	10th team
Division 2 Västsvenska Serien 1926–27	Unknown	Vänersborgs IF	9th team
Division 2 Västsvenska Serien 1926–27	Unknown	IK Ymer	10th team
Division 2 Sydsvenska Serien 1926–27	Unknown	Ängelholms IF	9th team
Division 2 Sydsvenska Serien 1926–27	Unknown	Lunds BK	10th team

== Domestic results ==
=== Allsvenskan 1926–27 ===

	Team	Pld	W	D	L	GF		GA	GD	Pts
1	GAIS	22	16	4	2	70	–	25	+45	36
2	IFK Göteborg	22	16	1	5	58	–	27	+31	33
3	Helsingborgs IF	22	16	0	6	74	–	34	+40	32
4	Örgryte IS	22	13	3	6	43	–	30	+13	29
5	AIK	22	10	3	9	38	–	36	+2	23
6	IK Sleipner	22	9	2	11	44	–	42	+2	20
7	IFK Eskilstuna	22	7	5	10	51	–	61	-10	19
8	IFK Norrköping	22	6	6	10	35	–	50	-15	18
9	Landskrona BoIS	22	7	2	13	36	–	56	-20	16
10	IF Elfsborg	22	6	4	12	33	–	60	-27	16
11	Westermalms IF	22	5	4	13	35	–	58	-23	14
12	IFK Uddevalla	22	2	4	16	27	–	65	-38	8

=== Allsvenskan promotion play-off 1926–27 ===
29 May 1927

IK City	1–2	Djurgårdens IF

?, Eskilstuna
3 June 1927

Djurgårdens IF	1–0	IK City

?, Stockholm

29 May 1927

Stattena IF	2–1	Skara IF

?, Helsingborg
6 June 1927

Skara IF	2–2	Stattena IF

?, Skara

=== Division 2 Uppsvenska Serien 1926–27 ===

	Team	Pld	W	D	L	GF		GA	GD	Pts
1	Sandvikens IF	14	11	1	2	70	–	23	+47	23
2	Sandvikens AIK	14	10	1	3	50	–	21	+29	21
3	IK Brage	14	7	3	4	32	–	34	-2	17
4	Brynäs IF	14	6	3	5	39	–	34	+5	15
5	Gefle IF	14	5	1	8	34	–	52	-18	11
6	Kvarnsvedens GIF	14	4	2	8	22	–	42	-20	10
7	Skutskärs IF	14	3	2	9	28	–	44	-16	8
8	IK Sirius	14	2	3	9	33	–	58	-25	7

=== Division 2 Mellansvenska Serien 1926–27 ===
	Team	Pld	W	D	L	GF		GA	GD	Pts
1	IK City	22	16	1	5	84	–	33	+51	33
2	IFK Västerås	22	12	5	5	57	–	36	+21	29
3	Västerås IK	22	11	5	6	54	–	41	+13	27
4	Hallstahammars SK	22	10	5	7	44	–	38	+6	25
5	Köpings IS	22	9	5	8	51	–	42	+9	23
6	Örebro SK	22	9	4	9	40	–	53	-13	22
7	Surahammars IF	22	8	5	9	45	–	56	-11	21
8	Katrineholms SK	22	7	5	10	37	–	53	-16	19
9	IFK Arboga	22	7	5	10	34	–	53	-19	19
10	Katrineholms AIK	22	7	3	12	50	–	55	-5	17
11	Västerås SK	22	5	6	11	39	–	49	-10	16
12	Kolbäcks AIF	22	5	3	14	41	–	64	-23	13

=== Division 2 Östsvenska Serien 1926–27 ===
	Team	Pld	W	D	L	GF		GA	GD	Pts
1	Djurgårdens IF	18	17	0	1	60	–	9	+51	34
2	BK Derby	18	12	1	5	41	–	24	+17	25
3	Hammarby IF	18	11	1	6	45	–	25	+20	23
4	Sundbybergs IK	18	9	2	7	37	–	36	+1	20
5	IFK Stockholm	18	9	2	7	45	–	46	-1	20
6	Huvudsta IS	18	8	3	7	30	–	29	+1	19
7	IF Linnéa	18	6	1	11	38	–	53	-15	13
8	Reymersholms IK	18	5	3	10	25	–	37	-12	13
9	Mariebergs IK	18	5	1	12	33	–	58	-25	11
10	Stockholms BK	18	1	0	17	19	–	56	-37	2

=== Division 2 Västsvenska Serien 1926–27 ===
	Team	Pld	W	D	L	GF		GA	GD	Pts
1	Skara IF	18	13	3	2	53	–	24	+29	29
2	Fässbergs IF	18	10	3	5	64	–	37	+27	23
3	Majornas IK	18	10	3	5	48	–	34	+14	23
4	Krokslätts FF	18	8	5	5	41	–	33	+8	21
5	Jonsereds IF	18	8	4	6	51	–	34	+17	20
6	Uddevalla IS	18	6	5	7	37	–	41	-4	17
7	IF Heimer	18	7	1	10	43	–	53	-10	15
8	Trollhättans IF	18	5	3	10	33	–	48	-15	13
9	Vänersborgs IF	18	4	2	12	34	–	67	-33	10
10	IK Ymer	18	3	3	12	36	–	66	-30	9

=== Division 2 Sydsvenska Serien 1926–27 ===
	Team	Pld	W	D	L	GF		GA	GD	Pts
1	Stattena IF	18	10	4	4	41	–	24	+17	24
2	IS Halmia	18	9	5	4	37	–	22	+15	23
3	Halmstads BK	18	11	1	6	42	–	25	+17	23
4	Malmö BI	18	9	2	7	38	–	41	-3	20
5	IFK Malmö	18	8	3	7	36	–	34	+2	19
6	Malmö FF	18	7	4	7	30	–	31	-1	18
7	IFK Helsingborg	18	6	4	8	28	–	31	-3	16
8	Varbergs GIF	18	5	3	10	28	–	40	-12	13
9	Ängelholms IF	18	3	7	8	19	–	36	-17	13
10	Lunds BK	18	4	3	11	16	–	31	-15	11

=== Norrländska Mästerskapet 1927 ===
Final

July 17, 1927

Söderhamns Skärgårds IF	8–1	IFK Östersund

Skärgårdens IP, Sandarne

== National team results ==
October 3, 1926
Friendly
№ 118

Sweden	3–1	Poland
Rydberg 30', 31'; Keller 43'		Józef Adamek 54'

Stockholms Stadion, Stockholm
Attendance: 17,000
Referee: Smedvik (Norway)

Sweden: Eric Jansson - Gunnar Casparsson, Douglas Krook - Åke Hansson, Arthur Bengtsson, Torsten Johansson - Algot Haglund, Gunnar Rydberg, Per Kaufeldt, Tore Keller, Bertil Appelskog.

October 3, 1926
1924–28 Nordic Championship
№ 119

Denmark	2–0	Sweden
Bendixen 41' (p); Rohde 69'

Idrætsparken, Copenhagen
Attendance: 26,000
Referee: Bauwens (Germany)

Sweden: Sigfrid Lindberg - Herbert Lundgren, Gunnar Zacharoff - Henning Helgesson, Nils Rosén, Verner Andersson - Rune Wenzel, Sven Rydell, Filip Johansson, Carl-Erik Holmberg, Knut Kroon.

November 7, 1926
Friendly
№ 120

Austria	3–1	Sweden
Horvath 2'; Klima 44'; Sindelar 85'		Rydberg 14'

Hohe Warte, Vienna
Attendance: 41,000
Referee: Bauwens (Germany)

Sweden: Sigfrid Lindberg - Axel Alfredsson, Gunnar Zacharoff - Erik Persson, Gunnar Holmberg, Verner Andersson - Rune Wenzel, Gunnar Rydberg, Filip Johansson, Albin Dahl, Thorsten Svensson.

November 14, 1926
Friendly
№ 121

Hungary	3–1	Sweden
Braun 2'; Opata 30'; Kohut 67'		Svensson 85'

Stadion Üllői Út, Budapest
Attendance: 26,000
Referee: Braun (Austria)

Sweden: Sigfrid Lindberg - Axel Alfredsson, Gunnar Zacharoff - Torsten Johansson, Gunnar Holmberg, Verner Andersson - Rune Wenzel, Gunnar Rydberg, Filip Johansson, Albin Dahl, Thorsten Svensson.

April 3, 1927
Friendly
№ 122

Belgium	2–1	Sweden
Braine 10'; Adams 51'		Rydell 46'

Duden Park, Brussels
Attendance: 17,000
Referee: Eymers (Netherlands)

Sweden: Sigfrid Lindberg - Axel Alfredsson, Gunnar Zacharoff - Åke Hansson, Sven Friberg, Ivar Klingström - Rune Wenzel, Sven Rydell, Per Kaufeldt, Filip Johansson, Knut Kroon.

May 29, 1927
Friendly
№ 123

Sweden	12–0	Latvia
Hallbäck 9', 30', 31', 44', 77', 84'; Rydell 11', 65', 85'; Johansson 40'; Kaufeldt 48'; Andersson 80'

Stockholms Stadion, Stockholm
Attendance: 19,000
Referee: Bauwens (Germany)

Sweden: Thure Westerdahl - Douglas Krook, Helge Zachrisson - Sven Lindqvist, John Persson, Torsten Johansson - Evert Lundqvist, Sven Rydell, Per Kaufeldt, Albin Hallbäck, Knut Andersson.

June 12, 1927
Friendly
№ 124

Sweden	6–2	Finland
Hallbäck 24', 88'; Kaufeldt 33'; Johansson 71', 85'; Dahl 79'		Åström 73', 86'

Stockholms Stadion, Stockholm
Attendance: 17,000
Referee: Smedvik (Norway)

Sweden: Thure Westerdahl - Knut Sandegren, Helge Zachrisson - Sven Lindqvist, Åke Hansson, Torsten Johansson - Rune Wenzel, Harry Dahl, Per Kaufeldt, Albin Hallbäck, Bertil Johansson.

June 19, 1927
1924–28 Nordic Championship
№ 125

Sweden	0–0	Denmark

Stockholms Stadion, Stockholm
Attendance: 20,000
Referee: Langenus (Belgium)

Sweden: Sigfrid Lindberg - Axel Alfredsson, Gunnar Zacharoff - Henning Helgesson, John Persson, Torsten Johansson - Rune Wenzel, Sven Rydell, Per Kaufeldt, Albin Hallbäck, Knut Kroon ( Carl-Erik Holmberg).

June 26, 1927
1924–28 Nordic Championship
№ 126

Norway	3–5	Sweden
Berstad 5', 80'; Gundersen 89'		Rydell 18', 23', 65'; Olsson 38', 68'

Gressbanen, Oslo
Attendance: 13,000
Referee: Remke (Denmark)

Sweden: Anders Rydberg - Axel Alfredsson, Douglas Krook - Henning Helgesson, Gunnar Holmberg, Ivar Klingström - Ernst Östlund, Sven Rydell, Albert Olsson, Carl-Erik Holmberg, Bertil Johansson.

July 1, 1927
Friendly
№ 127

Sweden	3–1	Estonia
Keller 2', 25', 79'		Paal 69'

Idrottsparken, Norrköping
Attendance: 5,134
Referee: Hansen (Denmark)

Sweden: Eric Jansson - Folke Andersson, Gunnar Zacharoff - Erik Andersson, Knut Lensing, Torsten Johansson - Algot Haglund, Gunnar Paulsson, Albert Olsson, Tore Keller, Bengt Carlsson.

== National team players in season 1926/27 ==
name	pos.	caps	goals	club
Axel "Massa" Alfredsson	DF	5	0	Hälsingborgs IF
Erik (Eric) "Markus" Andersson	MF	1	0	IK Sleipner
Folke "Börje" Andersson	DF	1	0	IK Sleipner
Knut Andersson	FW	1	1	Örgryte IS
Verner "Mickel" Andersson	MF	3	0	IFK Göteborg
Bertil "Bebbe" Appelskog	FW	1	0	IK Sleipner
Arthur Bengtsson	MF	1	0	IFK Göteborg
Bengt Carlsson	FW	1	0	IFK Norrköping
Gunnar "Caspar" Casparsson	DF	1	0	AIK
Albin Dahl	FW	2	0	Hälsingborgs IF
Harry "Hacke" Dahl	FW	1	1	Landskrona BoIS
Sven Friberg	MF	1	0	Örgryte IS
Algot "Agge" Haglund	FW	2	0	Djurgårdens IF
Albin "Spjass" Hallbäck	FW	3	8	IFK Malmö
Åke Hansson	MF	3	0	IFK Göteborg
Henning "Charmören" Helgesson	MF	3	0	Örgryte IS
Carl-Erik "Slana" Holmberg	FW	3	0	Örgryte IS
Gunnar "Bajadären" Holmberg	MF	3	0	GAIS
Eric "Jana" Jansson	GK	2	0	IK Sleipner
Bertil Johansson	FW	2	2	IFK Uddevalla
Filip "Svarte Filip" Johansson	FW	4	0	IFK Göteborg
Torsten Johansson	MF	6	1	IFK Norrköping
Per "Pära" Kaufeldt	FW	5	2	AIK
Tore Keller	FW	2	4	IK Sleipner
Ivar "Klinga" Klingström	MF	2	0	Örgryte IS
Douglas "Världens bäste" Krook	DF	3	0	Örgryte IS
Knut "Knutte" Kroon	FW	3	0	Hälsingborgs IF
Knut Lensing	MF	1	0	IFK Eskilstuna
Sigfrid "Sigge" Lindberg	GK	5	0	Hälsingborgs IF
Sven "Linkan" Lindqvist	MF	2	0	AIK
Herbert Lundgren	DF	1	0	GAIS
Evert "Lunkan" Lundqvist	FW	1	0	Örgryte IS
Albert "Abben" Olsson	FW	2	2	GAIS
Ernst Östlund	MF/FW	1	0	IFK Göteborg
Gunnar Paulsson	FW	1	0	GAIS
Erik "Krassi" Persson	MF	1	0	Hälsingborgs IF
John "Broarn" Persson	MF	2	0	AIK
Nils "Rossi" Rosén	MF	1	0	Hälsingborgs IF
Anders Rydberg	GK	1	0	IFK Göteborg
Gunnar "Lillen" Rydberg	FW	3	3	IFK Göteborg
Sven "Trollgubben" Rydell	FW	5	7	Örgryte IS
Knut Sandegren	DF	1	0	Örgryte IS
Thorsten Svensson	FW	2	1	GAIS
Rune Wenzel	FW	6	0	GAIS
Thure "Turken" Westerdahl	GK	2	0	AIK
Gunnar Zacharoff (Zackaroff)	DF	6	0	GAIS
Helge Zachrisson (Zackrisson)	DF	2	0	IF Elfsborg
