= 1929–30 in Swedish football =

The 1929-30 season in Swedish football, starting August 1929 and ending July 1930:

== Honours ==
=== Official titles ===
Title	Team	Reason
1929–30 Swedish Champions	None	–

=== Competitions ===
Level	Competition	Team
1st level	Allsvenskan 1929–30	Helsingborgs IF
2nd level	Division 2 Norra 1929–30	IFK Eskilstuna
2nd level	Division 2 Södra 1929–30	Redbergslids IK

== Promotions, relegations and qualifications ==
=== Promotions ===
Promoted from	Promoted to	Team	Reason
Division 2 Norra 1929–30	Allsvenskan 1930–31	Sandvikens IF	Winners
Division 2 Södra 1929–30	Allsvenskan 1930–31	Redbergslids IK	Winners
Division 3 1929–30	Division 2 Norra 1930–31	IK Brage	Winners of promotion play-off
Division 3 1929–30	Division 2 Norra 1930–31	Mariehofs IF	Winners of promotion play-off
Division 3 1929–30	Division 2 Södra 1930–31	BK Drott	Winners of promotion play-off
Division 3 1929–30	Division 2 Södra 1930–31	Kalmar AIK	Winners of promotion play-off

=== Relegations ===
Relegated from	Relegated to	Team	Reason
Allsvenskan 1929–30	Division 2 Norra 1930–31	IFK Norrköping	11th team
Allsvenskan 1929–30	Division 2 Södra 1930–31	Stattena IF	12th team
Division 2 Norra 1929–30	Division 3 1930–31	Köpings IS	10th team
Division 2 Norra 1929–30	Division 3 1930–31	Sundbybergs IK	11th team
Division 2 Södra 1929–30	Division 3 1930–31	Krokslätts FF	9th team
Division 2 Södra 1929–30	Division 3 1930–31	IFK Uddevalla	10th team

== Domestic results ==
=== Allsvenskan 1929–30 ===

	Team	Pld	W	D	L	GF		GA	GD	Pts
1	Helsingborgs IF	22	13	5	4	78	–	33	+45	31
2	IFK Göteborg	22	12	6	4	67	–	28	+39	30
3	IK Sleipner	22	12	5	5	48	–	37	+11	29
4	GAIS	22	11	6	5	46	–	31	+15	28
5	AIK	22	10	6	6	52	–	35	+17	26
6	Örgryte IS	22	12	2	8	59	–	43	+16	26
7	Landskrona BoIS	22	8	4	10	54	–	56	-2	20
8	IF Elfsborg	22	8	4	10	45	–	49	-4	20
9	Sandvikens IF	22	8	1	13	39	–	56	-17	17
10	IFK Malmö	22	6	4	12	37	–	59	-22	16
11	IFK Norrköping	22	5	2	15	32	–	77	-45	12
12	Stattena IF	22	3	3	16	28	–	81	-53	9

=== Division 2 Norra 1929–30 ===

	Team	Pld	W	D	L	GF		GA	GD	Pts
1	IFK Eskilstuna	20	12	6	2	68	–	40	+28	30
2	Hammarby IF	20	13	3	4	52	–	31	+21	29
3	Sandvikens AIK	20	13	3	4	67	–	46	+21	29
4	Gefle IF	20	11	2	7	53	–	38	+15	24
5	Hallstahammars SK	20	10	3	7	44	–	34	+10	23
6	IFK Västerås	20	9	2	9	43	–	40	+3	20
7	Westermalms IF	20	7	4	9	48	–	49	-1	18
8	Surahammars IF	20	6	5	9	43	–	45	-2	17
9	IK City	20	5	6	9	30	–	38	-8	16
10	Köpings IS	20	3	2	15	31	–	65	-34	8
11	Sundbybergs IK	20	2	2	16	27	–	69	-42	6

=== Division 2 Södra 1929–30 ===
	Team	Pld	W	D	L	GF		GA	GD	Pts
1	Redbergslids IK	18	15	1	2	56	–	19	+47	31
2	Malmö FF	18	9	2	7	47	–	34	+13	20
3	Fässbergs IF	18	9	2	7	38	–	30	+8	20
4	Halmstads BK	18	7	5	6	36	–	31	+5	19
5	BK Derby	18	8	3	7	33	–	42	-9	19
6	IFK Kristianstad	18	7	4	7	48	–	44	+4	18
7	Kalmar FF	18	6	4	8	31	–	44	-13	16
8	IS Halmia	18	4	7	7	26	–	25	+1	15
9	Krokslätts FF	18	5	4	9	27	–	48	-21	14
10	IFK Uddevalla	18	3	2	13	27	–	52	-25	8

=== Division 2 promotion play-off 1929–30 ===
9 June 1930

Djurgårdens IF	3–4	IK Brage

?, ?
15 June 1930

IK Brage	5–2	Djurgårdens IF

?, ?

9 June 1930

Örebro SK	4–0	Mariehofs IF

?, ?
15 June 1930

Mariehofs IF	4–0	Örebro SK

?, ?
22 June 1930

Örebro SK	?–? 2–3 (aet)	Mariehofs IF

?, ?

9 June 1930

BK Drott	2–2	Landala IF

?, ?
15 June 1930

Landala IF	3–3	BK Drott

?, ?
22 June 1930

BK Drott	?–? 3–2 (aet)	Landala IF

?, ?

9 June 1930

Kalmar AIK	1–0	Motala AIF

?, ?
15 June 1930

Motala AIF	1–3	Kalmar AIK

?, ?

== National team results ==
September 29, 1929
1929–32 Nordic Championship
№ 145

Norway	2–1	Sweden
Juve 21'; Gundersen 66'		Kroon 33'

Ullevaal, Oslo
Attendance: 25,000
Referee: Andersen (Denmark)

Sweden: Anders Rydberg - Douglas Krook, Gunnar Zacharoff - Allan Billing, Åke Hansson, Helge Liljebjörn - Charles Brommesson, Gunnar Olsson, Harry Lundahl, Albin Dahl, Knut Kroon.

June 15, 1930
Friendly
№ 146

Sweden	1–0	Switzerland
Kroon 82'

Stockholms Stadion, Stockholm
Attendance: 17,500
Referee: Baert (Belgium)

Sweden: Sigfrid Lindberg - Herbert Lundgren, Sven Andersson - Ernst Östlund, Arthur Bengtsson, Helge Liljebjörn - John Nilsson, Gunnar Rydberg, Filip Johansson, Tore Keller, Knut Kroon.

June 22, 1930
1929–32 Nordic Championship
№ 147

Denmark	6–1	Sweden
Jørgensen 16', 65' 88'; Eriksen 44'; Kleven 78'; Christophersen 89' (p)		Nilsson 66'

Idrætsparken, Copenhagen
Attendance: 28,000
Referee: Weingärtner (Germany)

Sweden: Sigfrid Lindberg - Herbert Lundgren, Sven Andersson - Ernst Östlund, Arthur Bengtsson, Helge Liljebjörn - John Nilsson, Sven Rydell, Per Kaufeldt, Filip Johansson, Knut Kroon.

July 6, 1930
1929–32 Nordic Championship
№ 148

Sweden	6–3	Norway
Lundahl 5', 13', 48'; Kroon 29', 56'; Dahl 44'		Juve 16', 42', 47'

Stockholms Stadion, Stockholm
Attendance: 18,000
Referee: de Wolf (Netherlands)

Sweden: Sigfrid Lindberg - Nils Axelsson, Sven Andersson - Walfrid Persson, Nils Rosén, Nils Nilsson - John Nilsson, Gunnar Olsson, Harry Lundahl, Albin Dahl, Knut Kroon.

July 18, 1930
Friendly
№ 149

Estonia	1–5	Sweden
Gerassimov-Kalvet 26'		Sundberg 10', 44', 73'; Thörn 38'; Johansson 41'

Kadriorg Stadium, Tallinn
Attendance: 6,000
Referee: Tuhkunen (Finland)

Sweden: Evert Jansson - Ivan Rosenberg, Erik Lager - Walfrid Persson, Thure Svensson, Einar Snitt - Gösta Dunker, Arvid Thörn, John Sundberg, Axel Nilsson, Knut Johansson.

July 22, 1930
Friendly
№ 150

Latvia	0–5	Sweden
		Nilsson 5', 75'; Johansson 14'; Dunker 26', 80'

JKS Stadions, Riga
Attendance: 5,000
Referee: Paal (Estonia)

Sweden: Evert Jansson - Ivan Rosenberg, Erik Lager - Walfrid Persson, Thure Svensson, Einar Snitt - Gösta Dunker, Arvid Thörn ( Ernst Lööf), John Sundberg, Axel Nilsson, Knut Johansson.

== National team players in season 1929/30 ==
name	pos.	caps	goals	club
Sven "Vrålis" Andersson	DF	3	0	AIK
Nils Axelsson	DF	1	0	Hälsingborgs IF
Arthur Bengtsson	MF	2	0	IFK Göteborg
Allan "Rovern" Billing	MF	1	0	Örgryte IS
Charles "Bromme" Brommesson	FW	1	0	Hälsingborgs IF
Albin Dahl	FW	2	1	Hälsingborgs IF
Gösta Dunker	FW	2	2	Sandvikens IF
Åke Hansson	MF	1	0	Redbergslids IK
Evert Jansson	GK	2	0	Gefle IF
Filip "Svarte Filip" Johansson	FW	2	0	IFK Göteborg
Knut Johansson	FW	2	2	Westermalms IF
Per "Pära" Kaufeldt	FW	1	0	AIK
Tore Keller	FW	1	0	IK Sleipner
Douglas "Världens bäste" Krook	DF	1	0	Örgryte IS
Knut "Knutte" Kroon	FW	4	4	Hälsingborgs IF
Erik Lager	DF	2	0	Redbergslids IK
Helge Liljebjörn	MF	3	0	GAIS
Sigfrid "Sigge" Lindberg	GK	3	0	Hälsingborgs IF
Ernst Lööf	FW	1	0	Sandvikens AIK
Harry Lundahl	FW	2	3	Hälsingborgs IF
Herbert Lundgren	DF	2	0	GAIS
Axel "Acke" Nilsson	FW	2	2	Hammarby IF
John "Jompa" Nilsson	FW	3	1	AIK
Nils "Gävle" Nilsson	MF	1	0	AIK
Gunnar "Lill-Gunnar" Olsson	FW	2	0	Hälsingborgs IF
Ernst Östlund	MF	2	0	IFK Göteborg
Walfrid "Valle" Persson	MF	3	0	Sandvikens IF
Nils "Rossi" Rosén	MF	1	0	Hälsingborgs IF
Ivan "Tigern" Rosenberg	DF	2	0	IFK Malmö
Anders Rydberg	GK	1	0	IFK Göteborg
Gunnar "Lillen" Rydberg	FW	1	0	IFK Göteborg
Sven "Trollgubben" Rydell	FW	1	0	Örgryte IS
Einar Snitt	MF	2	0	Sandvikens IF
John Sundberg	FW	2	3	Sandvikens AIK
Thure "Kusken" Svensson	MF	2	0	Gefle IF
Arvid Thörn	FW	2	1	IFK Grängesberg
Gunnar Zacharoff (Zackaroff)	DF	1	0	GAIS
