= Helge Andersson (footballer, born 1907) =

Swedish footballer

Personal information
- Full name: Helge Vilhelm Andersson
- Date of birth: 20 February 1907
- Place of birth: Västerås, Sweden
- Date of death: 6 September 1960 (aged 53)
- Place of death: Surahammar, Sweden
- Position: Forward

Senior career*
Years	Team	Apps	(Gls)
- Västerås
- Surahammars

International career
1928–1932	Sweden	2	(2)
- * Club domestic league appearances and goals

Helge Vilhelm Andersson (20 February 1907 – 6 September 1960) was a Swedish footballer who played for Västerås and Surahammars IF. He featured twice for the Sweden men's national football team in 1928 and 1932, scoring two goals.

== Career statistics ==
=== International ===
Appearances and goals by national team and year
National team	Year	Apps	Goals
Sweden	1928	1	2
Sweden	1932	1	0
Total		2	2

International goals

Scores and results list Sweden's goal tally first.

No	Date	Venue	Opponent	Score	Result	Competition
1.	2 September 1928	Töölön Pallokenttä, Helsinki, Finland	Finland	2–0	3–2	Friendly
2.	2 September 1928	Töölön Pallokenttä, Helsinki, Finland	Finland	3–2	3–2	Friendly
