= Otto Novák =

Czech footballer

Personal information
- Date of birth: 22 March 1902
- Place of birth: Modřany, Austria-Hungary
- Date of death: 15 October 1984 (aged 82)
- Position: Forward

Senior career*
| Years | Team | Apps | (Gls) |
| 1925–1931 | Viktoria Žižkov | 60 | (49) |

International career
| 1924–1927 | Czechoslovakia | 6 | (3) |
- * Club domestic league appearances and goals

Otto Novák (22 March 1902 – 15 October 1984) was a Czech footballer who played as a forward. He competed for Czechoslovakia in the men's tournament at the 1924 Summer Olympics.

At club level, he played for FK Viktoria Žižkov in the Czechoslovak First League between 1925 and 1931, scoring 49 goals in 60 matches. He won the 1927–28 Czechoslovak First League with the club.

== Honours ==
Viktoria Žižkov

- Czechoslovak First League: 1927–28
