= Ernst Wahlberg =

Swedish footballer

Personal information
- Full name: Ernst Leonard Wahlberg
- Date of birth: 15 October 1904
- Date of death: 1 May 1977 (aged 72)

Senior career*
Years	Team	Apps	(Gls)
–1924	Djurgårdens IF		
1924–1934	AIK	151	(93)

International career
1930	Sweden	1	(0)
- * Club domestic league appearances and goals

Ernst Leonard Wahlberg (15 October 1904 – 1 May 1977) was a Swedish footballer. He made one appearance for the Sweden national team.
