= Arvid Thörn =

Swedish footballer

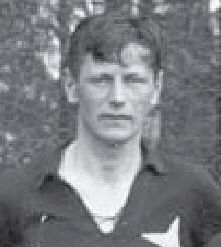

Personal information
- Date of birth: 13 February 1911
- Place of birth: Grängesberg, Sweden
- Date of death: 2 December 1986 (aged 75)
- Position: Forward

Senior career*
Years	Team	Apps	(Gls)
- IFK Grängesberg
- Örebro SK

International career
- Sweden
- * Club domestic league appearances and goals

Arvid Thörn (13 February 1911 – 2 December 1986) was a Swedish footballer who played as a forward for Sweden in the 1934 FIFA World Cup. He also played for IFK Grängesberg and Örebro SK.
