= Rupert Andersson =

Swedish footballer

Personal information
- Full name: Oskar Rupert Andersson
- Date of birth: 28 February 1909
- Place of birth: Borg, Norrköping, Sweden
- Date of death: 3 February 1983 (aged 73)
- Place of death: Norrköping, Sweden
- Position: Forward

Senior career*
Years	Team	Apps	(Gls)
- Sleipner

International career
1929	Sweden	1	(3)
- * Club domestic league appearances and goals

Oskar Rupert Andersson (28 February 1909 – 3 February 1983) was a Swedish footballer who played for Sleipner. He featured once for the Sweden men's national football team in 1929, scoring a hat-trick against Latvia.

== Career statistics ==
=== International ===
Appearances and goals by national team and year
National team	Year	Apps	Goals
Sweden	1929	1	3
Total		1	3

=== International goals ===
Scores and results list Sweden's goal tally first.

No	Date	Venue	Opponent	Score	Result	Competition
1.	28 July 1929	Malmö IP, Malmö, Sweden	Latvia	4–0	10–0	Friendly
2.	28 July 1929	Malmö IP, Malmö, Sweden	Latvia	8–0	10–0	Friendly
3.	28 July 1929	Malmö IP, Malmö, Sweden	Latvia	10–0	10–0	Friendly
