= Rudolf Seidl =

Austrian footballer (1897–1940)

Personal information
- Date of birth: 28 November 1897
- Place of birth: Vienna
- Date of death: 1940 (aged 42–43)
- Position: Midfielder

Senior career*
Years	Team	Apps	(Gls)
- Floridsdorfer AC
- First Vienna FC
- Floridsdorfer AC
- First Vienna FC

International career
1920–1928	Austria	8	(1)

Managerial career
- 1929–1930: Brigittenauer AC
- 1931–1932: Austria Wien
- 1935–1940: Floridsdorfer AC
- * Club domestic league appearances and goals

Rudolf Seidl (28 November 1897 – 1940) was an Austrian football player and manager who played as a midfielder. He made eight appearances for the Austria national team from 1920 to 1928.
