= Jiří Mareš =

Czech footballer

Personal information
- Date of birth: 16 February 1992 (age 34)
- Place of birth: Czechoslovakia
- Height: 1.75 m (5 ft 9 in)
- Position: Midfielder

Team information
- Current team: Příbram
- Number: 21

Senior career*
Years	Team	Apps	(Gls)
2011–	Příbram	75	(7)

International career^{‡}
2012	Czech Republic U20	1	(0)
2012–	Czech Republic U21	3	(1)
- * Club domestic league appearances and goals as of 25 December 2014 ‡ National team caps and goals as of 25 December 2014

Jiří Mareš (born 16 February 1992) is a Czech footballer who plays as a midfielder for Příbram in the Czech First League.
