= Carl Wijk =

Swedish football manager

Personal information
- Full name: Carl Wijk
- Place of birth: Sweden

Senior career*
Years	Team	Apps	(Gls)
- IFK Malmö

International career
1926	Sweden	1	(0)

Managerial career
- 1932–1934: Malmö FF
- * Club domestic league appearances and goals

Carl Wijk was a Swedish football manager. He was Malmö FF's first manager in Allsvenskan when he started managing the club.
