= Folke Andersson =

Swedish ice hockey player

Folke Gustav Walter Andersson-Ahrsjö
- Born: 19 February 1903 Stockholm, Sweden
- Died: 10 January 1963 (aged 59) Stockholm, Sweden
- Played for: Djurgården

Folke Andersson-Ahrsjö (19 February 1903 – 10 January 1963) was a Swedish ice hockey player. Andersson-Åhrsjö was part of the Djurgården Swedish champions' team of 1926. In the finals against Västerås SK Andersson-Åhrsjö scored five out of seven goals and became match hero.
