= Sigfrid Roos =

Swedish footballer

Personal information
- Full name: Alf Sigfrid Emanuel Roos
- Date of birth: 24 September 1908
- Place of birth: Västerås, Sweden
- Date of death: 18 November 1997 (aged 89)
- Place of death: Västerås, Sweden
- Position: Forward

Senior career*
Years	Team	Apps	(Gls)
- Västerås

International career
1928–1931	Sweden	2	(2)
- * Club domestic league appearances and goals

Alf Sigfrid Emanuel Roos (9 September 1908 – 8 August 1988) was a Swedish footballer who played for Västerås. He featured twice for the Sweden men's national football team in 1928 and 1931, scoring two goals.

== Career statistics ==
=== International ===
Appearances and goals by national team and year
National team	Year	Apps	Goals
Sweden	1928	1	0
Sweden	1931	1	2
Total		2	2

=== International goals ===
Scores and results list Sweden's goal tally first.

No	Date	Venue	Opponent	Score	Result	Competition
1.	26 July 1931	Arosvallen, Västerås, Sweden	Latvia	2–0	6–0	Friendly
2.	26 July 1931	Arosvallen, Västerås, Sweden	Latvia	3–0	6–0	Friendly
