= IFK Uddevalla =

Association football club in Sweden

IFK Uddevalla 1905
- Full name: Idrottsföreningen Kamraterna Uddevalla 1905
- Nickname: IFK
- Founded: 1905; 121 years ago
- Ground: Fridhemsvallen(Uddevalla); Uddevalla, Sweden
- Capacity: 1500
- Chairman: Anders Berntsson
- Coach: Jonas Karlsson
- League: Division 3 Nordvästra Götaland
- 2019: Division 2 Norra Götaland, 14th (Relegated)
- Website: http://www.ifkuddevalla.nu/
Home colours

IFK Uddevalla is a Swedish football club located in Uddevalla and played two seasons in the highest Swedish league, Allsvenskan, in 1925–26 and 1926–27.

== Background ==
Idrottsföreningen Kamraterna Uddevalla were formed on 19 May 1905 and is today the oldest active football club in Bohuslän. The club's first committee was made up of John Andrén (chairman), Viktor Karlsson (vice chairman), Awe Johansson (treasurer), Mikael Swanberg (secretary), Johan Johansson, Albert Johansson, Gustav Lidman, Axel Hagman, Karl Hansson, Albert Andersson and Hans Lundgren. Originally IFK Uddevalla had many sections, but football has always been the dominant sport. Wrestling, swimming, skiing, athletics, bandy, handball, hockey and figure skating over the years had their own sections within the club but today IFK Uddevalla is only a football club.

Oskar Andersson took over the gavel in 1906 and under his leadership IFK Uddevalla played two seasons in the Allsvenskan in the 1920s. He was at that time chairman of Bohuslän-Dals Fotbollförbund, Bohuslän-Dals Idrottsförbund, and also a member of the Swedish Football Association. On behalf of the club, Oskar Andersson also initiated the development of the Rimnersvallen, which was inaugurated in 1923. His chairmanship lasted from 1906 to 1942.

Since their foundation IFK Uddevalla has participated mainly in the upper and middle divisions of the Swedish football league system. The club currently plays in Division 2 Norra Götaland which is the fourth tier of Swedish football. They played two seasons in the highest Swedish league, Allsvenskan, in 1925–26 and 1926–27. IFK Uddevalla have not returned since, although they played a few seasons in the second highest league in the early 1990s. They play their home matches at the Kamratgården in Uddevalla.

IFK Uddevalla are affiliated to Bohusläns Fotbollförbund.

== Current squad ==
As of 7 October 2013.

Note: Flags indicate national team as defined under FIFA eligibility rules; some limited exceptions apply. Players may hold more than one non-FIFA nationality.

No.	Pos.	Nation	Player
2	DF	SWE	Rickard Stengårds
4	DF	SWE	Mathias Hegeland
5	DF	SWE	Jesper Landberg
6	DF	SWE	Fredrik Brändén
7	MF	SWE	Kristoffer Larsson
8	MF	SWE	Linus Skarin
9	DF	SWE	Patrik Adamczyk
10	FW	SWE	Daniel Fredriksson
12	MF	SWE	Albin Sheqiri

No.	Pos.	Nation	Player
13	DF	SWE	Johan Ewerlöf
16	DF	SWE	Marcus Larsén
17	FW	SWE	Arlind Beqiri
19	FW	SWE	Filip Hansson
23	MF	SWE	Jonas Andersson
24	MF	SWE	Sebastian Jaconelli
27	FW	SWE	Sixten Cederholm
29	MF	SWE	Johannes Stengårds
30	GK	SWE	Rasmus Axelsson
40	DF	SWE	Filip Karlin
—	FW	SLE	Ibrahim Tahini
—	MF	SWE	Henrik Palmersjö

== History ==
In their early years IFK Uddevalla competed in the following divisions:

1925 – Division II, Västsvenska
1926 – Allsvenskan
1927 – Allsvenskan
1928 – Division II, Västsvenska
1929 – Division II, Södra
1930 – Division II, Södra
1931 – Division III, Västsvenska
1932 – Division III, Västsvenska
1933 – Division II, Västra
1934 – Division II, Västra
1935 – Division II, Västra
1936 – Division III, Västsvenska Norra
1937 – Division III, Västsvenska Norra
1938 – Division III, Västsvenska Norra
1939 – Division III, Västsvenska Norra
1940 – Division III, Västsvenska Norra
1941 – Division III, Nordvästra Södra
1942 – Division III, Nordvästra Södra, Bohus
1943 – Division II, Västra
1944 – Division II, Västra
1945 – Division II, Västra
1946 – Division II, Västra
1947 – Division II, Västra
1948 – Division II, Sydvästra
1949 – Division III, Västra

In recent seasons IFK Uddevalla have competed in the following divisions:

1993 – Division I, Södra
1994 – Division II, Västra Götaland
1995 – Division II, Västra Götaland
1996 – Division II, Västra Götaland
1997 – Division II, Västra Götaland
1998 – Division III, Nordvästra Götaland
1999 – Division IV, Bohuslän/Dal
2000 – Division III, Nordvästra Götaland
2001 – Division IV, Bohuslän/Dal
2002 – Division IV, Bohuslän/Dal
2003 – Division III, Nordvästra Götaland
2004 – Division IV, Bohuslän/Dal
2005 – Division IV, Bohuslän/Dal
2006 – Division IV, Bohuslän/Dal
2007 – Division IV, Bohuslän/Dal
2008 – Division IV, Bohuslän/Dal
2009 – Division IV, Bohuslän/Dal
2010 – Division III, Nordvästra Götaland
2011 – Division III, Nordvästra Götaland
2012 – Division II, Västra Götaland
2013 – Division II, Norra Götaland
2014 – Division I,
2015 – Division II, Norra Götaland
2016 – Division II, Norra Götaland
2017 – Division II, Norra Götaland
2018 – Division II, Norra Götaland

== Attendances ==
In recent seasons IFK Uddevalla have had the following average attendances:

Season	Average attendance	Division / Section	Level
2009	Not available	Div 4 Bohuslän/Dal	Tier 6
2010	66	Div 3 Nordvästra Götaland	Tier 5
2011	94	Div 3 Nordvästra Götaland	Tier 5
2012	149	Div 2 Västra Götaland	Tier 4
2013	169	Div 2 Norra Götaland	Tier 4

* Attendances are provided in the Publikliga sections of the Svenska Fotbollförbundet website.

== Achievements ==
- Allsvenskan:
  - Best placement (10th): 1925–26
