= Torsten Johansson (footballer) =

Swedish footballer (1906–1989)

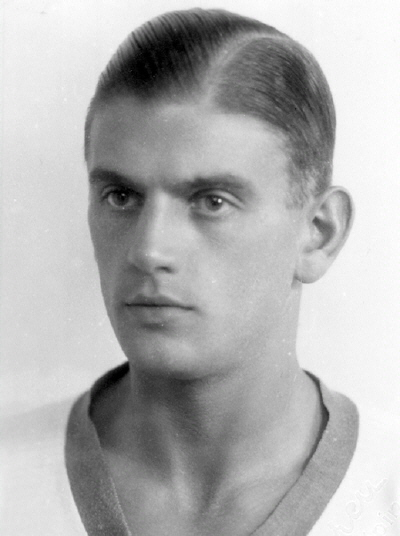
- Johansson circa 1935

Personal information
- Full name: Torsten Henning Johansson
- Date of birth: 17 January 1906
- Place of birth: Norrköping, Sweden
- Date of death: 17 January 1989 (aged 83)
- Place of death: Göteborg, Sweden
- Position: Midfielder

Senior career*
Years	Team	Apps	(Gls)
1925–1937	IFK Norrköping		

International career
1926–1936	Sweden	14	(3)
- * Club domestic league appearances and goals

Torsten Henning Johansson (17 January 1906 – 8 January 1989) was a Swedish footballer who played as a midfielder for IFK Norrköping and the Sweden national team. He competed in the men's tournament at the 1936 Summer Olympics.
