= Henning Helgesson =

Swedish footballer

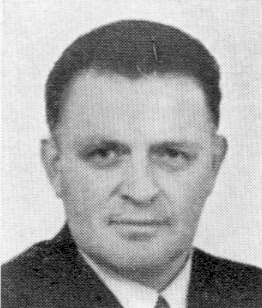

Personal information
- Date of birth: 28 March 1900
- Date of death: 25 September 1986 (aged 86)
- Position: Midfielder

Senior career*
Years	Team	Apps	(Gls)
- IK Virgo
1923–1932	Örgryte IS		

International career
1923–1929	Sweden	20	(2)
- * Club domestic league appearances and goals

Henning Helgesson (28 March 1900 – 25 September 1986) was a Swedish footballer who played as a midfielder.
