= Charles Brommesson =

Swedish footballer (1903–1978)

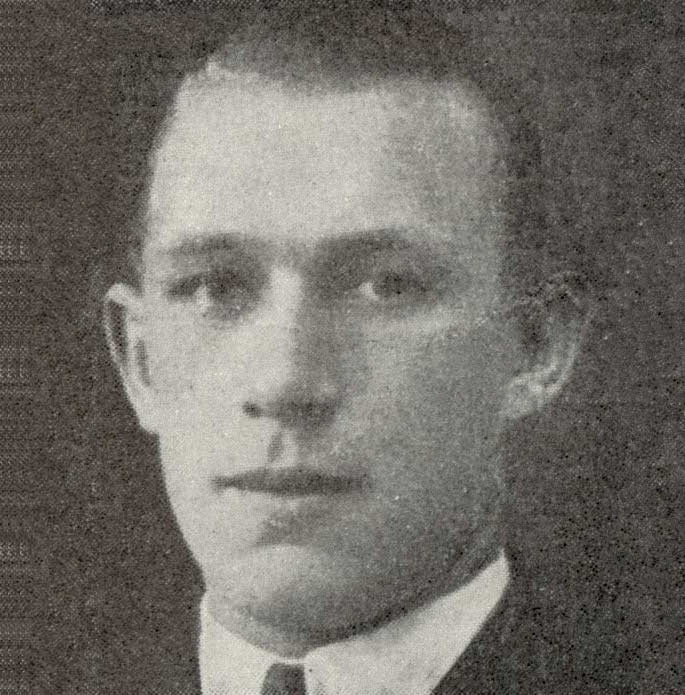
- Brommesson in the 1920s

Personal information
- Full name: Fritz Johan Charles Brommesson
- Date of birth: 12 August 1903
- Place of birth: Helsingborg, Sweden
- Date of death: 1 September 1978 (aged 75)
- Place of death: Helsingborg, Sweden
- Position: Midfielder

Senior career*
Years	Team	Apps	(Gls)
1923–1931	Helsingborgs IF		

International career
1923–1930	Sweden	12	(4)
Medal record
Representing Sweden
Olympic Games
Bronze medal – third place	1924 Paris	Team
- * Club domestic league appearances and goals

Fritz Johan Charles Brommesson (12 August 1903 – 1 September 1978) was a Swedish football midfielder who won a bronze medal at the 1924 Summer Olympics. He played three matches and scored three goals.
