= Åke Hansson (footballer, born 1903) =

Swedish footballer

Personal information
- Full name: Åke Rolf Hansson
- Date of birth: 16 April 1903
- Place of birth: Gothenburg, Sweden
- Date of death: 21 October 1981 (aged 78)
- Position: Defender

Senior career*
Years	Team	Apps	(Gls)
- IK Virgo
1924–1929	IFK Göteborg		
1929–1931	Redbergslids IK		

International career
1925–1929	Sweden	12	(0)
- * Club domestic league appearances and goals

Åke Hansson (16 April 1903 – 21 October 1981) was a Swedish footballer who played as a defender.
