= Harry Lundahl =

Swedish footballer and manager

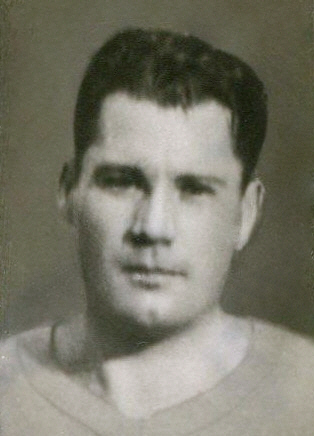
- Harry Lundahl in the mid 1930s

Personal information
- Full name: Harry Lundahl
- Date of birth: 16 October 1905
- Place of birth: Helsingborg, Sweden
- Date of death: 2 March 1988 (aged 82)
- Position: Centre midfielder

Youth career
- 1917–1927: BK Drott

Senior career*
Years	Team	Apps	(Gls)
1927–1931	Helsingborgs IF		
1931–1935	IFK Eskilstuna		
1937–1938	Helsingborgs IF		

International career
1928–1934	Sweden	14	(13)

Managerial career
- 1935–1937: Malmö BI
- 1937–1941: Malmö FF
- 1940–1941: Sweden
- * Club domestic league appearances and goals

Harry Lundahl (16 October 1905 – 2 March 1988) was a Swedish football player and manager. He is most famous for his time playing for Helsingborgs IF.

== Bibliography ==
- Smitt, Rikard (2009). Ända sen gamla dagar... Project Management AB. ISBN 978-91-633-5767-1.
