= Einar Snitt =

Swedish footballer

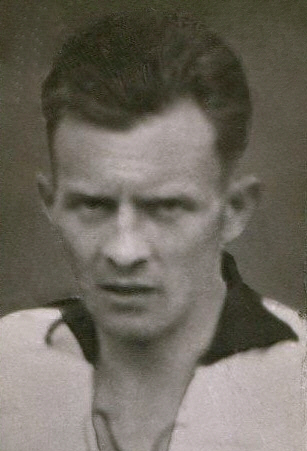
- Snitt c. 1935.

Personal information
- Date of birth: 13 January 1905
- Place of birth: Sweden
- Date of death: 2 January 1973 (aged 67)
- Position: Midfielder

Senior career*
Years	Team	Apps	(Gls)
1920–1939	Sandvikens IF		

International career
1926–1936	Sweden	17	(0)
- * Club domestic league appearances and goals

Einar Snitt (13 October 1905 – 2 January 1973) was a Swedish footballer who played for the Sweden national team. He was a reserve in the 1934 FIFA World Cup. He had 17 caps for Sweden. He was also part of Sweden's squad at the 1936 Summer Olympics, but he did not play in any matches.
