= Carl-Erik Holmberg =

Swedish footballer

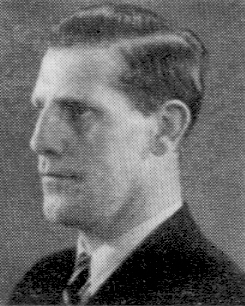

Personal information
- Date of birth: 17 July 1906
- Place of birth: Gothenburg, Sweden
- Date of death: 5 June 1991 (aged 84)
- Position: Forward

Senior career*
| Years | Team | Apps | (Gls) |
- Örgryte IS

International career
| 1926–1932 | Sweden | 14 | (8) |
- * Club domestic league appearances and goals

Carl-Erik Holmberg (17 July 1906 – 5 June 1991) was a Swedish football forward who played for Örgryte IS. He also played for the Sweden national team, and was a reserve during the 1934 FIFA World Cup in Italy.
