= Sundbybergs IK =

Swedish football club

- Full name: Sundbybergs Idrottsklubb
- Short name: SIK
- Founded: 9 April 1893
- Ground: Sundbybergs IP, Sundbyberg
- Chairman: Morthen Holmberg
- Head coach: Zoran Lukic
- League: Division 3 Norra Svealand
- 2021: Division 3 Norra Svealand, 2nd
- Website: http://sikfotboll.se//
Home colours	Away colours

Sundbybergs IK is a Swedish football club located in Sundbyberg.

== Background ==
Sundbybergs IK, (abbreviated as SIK), is a sports club based in Sundbyberg. The club currently has thirteen sections and around 3000 members catering for the sports of football, athletics, bandy, bowling, gymnastics, floorball, handball, orienteering, swimming, skiing (cross country and slalom), table tennis and general fitness.

The club was formed on 19 April 1893 by a group of youngsters who had gathered at a cafe in Sundbyberg as the result of an initiative by Gustaf Hammarin. The list of those who attended and the minutes of the meeting have been preserved in the club's archives. Sundbybergs IK has played in Sweden's highest bandy league in the 1948, 1951 and 1953 seasons.

The football section was formed in 1904 and its most successful period was from 1924–25 until 1950–51 during which the club spent 17 seasons in Division 2 which at that time was the second tier of Swedish football. The club's most famous player is Stefan Rehn who moved on to Djurgårdens IF, Everton F.C., IFK Göteborg and Lausanne Sports and played 45 times for the Swedish national side.

In 2020 Sundbybergs IK plays in Division 3 Norra Svealand coached by Zoran Lukic. Division 3 is the fifth tier of Swedish football. They play their home matches at the Sundbybergs IP in Sundbyberg.

The club is affiliated to Stockholms Fotbollförbund. The club's women's side played one season in the Damallsvenskan in 2000 but in 2019 they reside in Women's Division 3 Stockholm A.

== Season to season ==
In their most successful period Sundbybergs IK competed in the following divisions:

Season	Level	Division	Section	Position	Movements
1924–25	Tier 2	Division 2	Östsvenska	2nd	
1925–26	Tier 2	Division 2	Östsvenska	2nd	
1926–27	Tier 2	Division 2	Östsvenska	4th	
1927–28	Tier 2	Division 2	Östsvenska	2nd	
1928–29	Tier 2	Division 2	Norra	3rd	
1929–30	Tier 2	Division 2	Norra	11th	Relegated
1930–31	Tier 3	Division 3	Östsvenska	2nd	
1931–32	Tier 3	Division 3	Östsvenska	7th	
1932–33	Tier 3	Division 3	Östsvenska	1st	Promoted
1933–34	Tier 2	Division 2	Östra	5th	
1934–35	Tier 2	Division 2	Östra	7th	
1935–36	Tier 2	Division 2	Östra	9th	Relegated
1936–37	Tier 3	Division 3	Östsvenska	1st	Promoted
1937–38	Tier 2	Division 2	Norra	9th	Relegated
1938–39	Tier 3	Division 3	Östsvenska	3rd	
1939–40	Tier 3	Division 3	Östsvenska	1st	Promoted
1940–41	Tier 2	Division 2	Norra	5th	
1941–42	Tier 2	Division 2	Norra	7th	
1942–43	Tier 2	Division 2	Norra	10th	Relegated
1943–44	Tier 3	Division 3	Östsvenska Södra	1st	Promotion Playoffs – Promoted
1944–45	Tier 2	Division 2	Östra	4th	
1945–46	Tier 2	Division 2	Östra	9th	Relegated
1946–47	Tier 3	Division 3	Östsvenska	1st	Promotion Playoffs
1947–48	Tier 3	Division 3	Östra	1st	Promoted
1948–49	Tier 2	Division 2	Nordöstra	3rd	
1949–50	Tier 2	Division 2	Nordöstra	9th	Relegated
1950–51	Tier 3	Division 3	Östra	8th	Relegated
1951-52	Tier 4	Division 4	?	?	
1952-53	Tier 4	Division 4	?	?	
1953-54	Tier 4	Division 4	?	?	
1954-55	Tier 4	Division 4	?	?	Promoted
1955–56	Tier 3	Division 3	Östra Svealand	6th	
1956–57	Tier 3	Division 3	Östra Svealand	6th	
1957–58	Tier 3	Division 3	Östra Svealand	4th	
1959	Tier 3	Division 3	Östra Svealand	2nd	
1960	Tier 3	Division 3	Östra Svealand	1st	Promoted
1961	Tier 2	Division 2	Svealand	3rd	
1962	Tier 2	Division 2	Svealand	3rd	
1963	Tier 2	Division 2	Svealand	4th	
1964	Tier 2	Division 2	Svealand	2nd	
1965	Tier 2	Division 2	Svealand	5th	
1966	Tier 2	Division 2	Svealand	4th	
1967	Tier 2	Division 2	Svealand	5th	
1968	Tier 2	Division 2	Svealand	7th	
1969	Tier 2	Division 2	Svealand	10th	Relegated
1970	Tier 3	Division 3	Östra Svealand	5th	
1971	Tier 3	Division 3	Östra Svealand	7th	
1972	Tier 3	Division 3	Östra Svealand	5th	
1973	Tier 3	Division 3	Östra Svealand	7th	
1974	Tier 3	Division 3	Östra Svealand	9th	
1975	Tier 3	Division 3	Östra Svealand	7th	
1976	Tier 3	Division 3	Östra Svealand	12th	Relegated

In recent seasons Sundbybergs IK have competed in the following divisions:

Season	Level	Division	Section	Position	Movements
1999	Tier 5	Division 4	Stockholm Mellersta	2nd	
2000	Tier 5	Division 4	Stockholm Mellersta	2nd	Promotion Playoffs – Promoted
2001	Tier 4	Division 3	Östra Svealand	6th	
2002	Tier 4	Division 3	Östra Svealand	11th	Relegated
2003	Tier 5	Division 4	Stockholm Mellersta	10th	
2004	Tier 5	Division 4	Stockholm Mellersta	4th	
2005	Tier 5	Division 4	Stockholm Mellersta	7th	
2006*	Tier 6	Division 4	Stockholm Mellersta	8th	
2007	Tier 6	Division 4	Stockholm Mellersta	5th	
2008	Tier 6	Division 4	Stockholm Norra	7th	
2009	Tier 6	Division 4	Stockholm Norra	7th	
2010	Tier 6	Division 4	Stockholm Norra	9th	
2011	Tier 6	Division 4	Stockholm Norra	9th	
2012	Tier 6	Division 4	Stockholm Norra	4th	
2013	Tier 6	Division 4	Stockholm Norra	2nd	Promotion Playoffs – Promoted
2014	Tier 5	Division 3	Östra Svealand	2nd	Promotion Playoffs –
2015	Tier 5	Division 3	Östra Svealand	1st	Promoted
2016	Tier 4	Division 2	Norra Svealand	11th	
2017	Tier 4	Division 2	Norra Svealand	9th	
2018	Tier 4	Division 2	Norra Svealand	7th	
2019	Tier 4	Division 2	Norra Svealand	14th	Relegated
2020	Tier 5	Division 3	Norra Svealand	4th	
2021	Tier 5	Division 3	Norra Svealand	2nd	

* League restructuring in 2006 resulted in a new division being created at Tier 3 and subsequent divisions dropping a level.

== Attendances ==
In recent seasons Sundbybergs IK have had the following average attendances:

Season	Average attendance	Division / Section	Level
2013	106	Div 4 Stockholm Norra	Tier 6
2014	98	Div 3 Östra Svealand	Tier 5
2015	136	Div 3 Östra Svealand	Tier 5
2016	172	Div 2 Norra Svealand	Tier 4
2017	181	Div 2 Norra Svealand	Tier 4
2018	Not Available	Div 2 Norra Svealand	Tier 4
2019	?	Div 2 Norra Svealand	Tier 4
2020	?	Div 3 Norra Svealand	Tier 5
2021	?	Div 3 Norra Svealand	Tier 5

* Attendances are provided in the Publikliga sections of the Svenska Fotbollförbundet website.

== Notable players ==
- (Sweden) Bernt Andersson
- (Sweden) Stefan Rehn
- (Sweden) Taha Ali

== Notable Managers ==
- (Sweden) Henry Carlsson
- (Sweden) Zoran Lukic
