= Axel Alfredsson =

Swedish footballer (1902–1966)

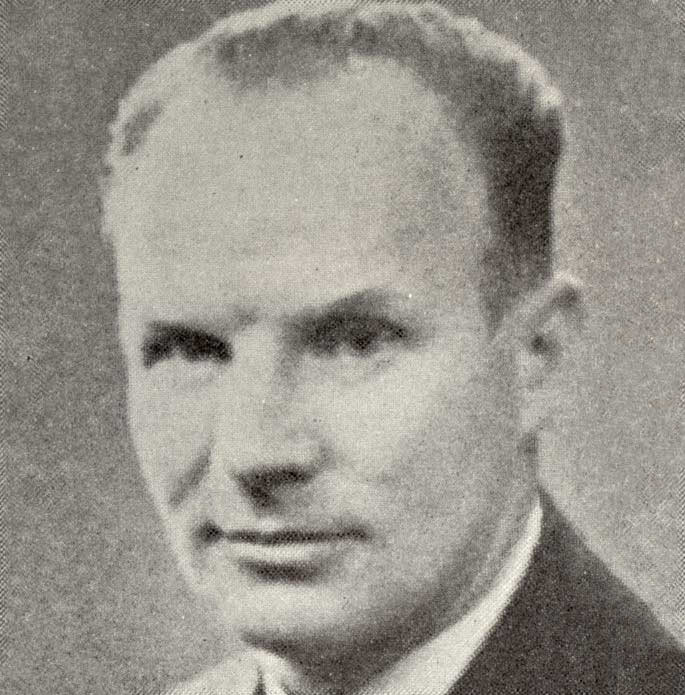

Personal information
- Born: 2 May 1902 Helsingborg, Sweden
- Died: 9 August 1966 (aged 64) Nacka, Sweden

Sport
- Sport: Football
- Club: Helsingborgs IF
Medal record
Representing Sweden
Olympic Games
| Bronze medal – third place | 1924 Paris | Team |

Axel "Massa" Alfredsson (2 May 1902 – 9 August 1966) was a Swedish footballer who won a bronze medal at the 1924 Summer Olympics. He played 31 international matches for the Sweden national team.
