= Knut Kroon =

Swedish footballer

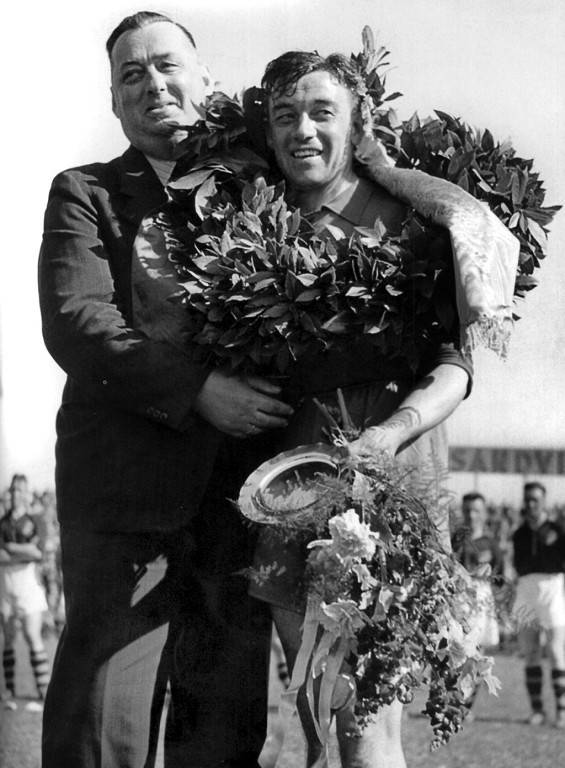

Personal information
- Full name: Knut Kroon
- Date of birth: June 19, 1906
- Place of birth: Helsingborg, Sweden
- Date of death: February 27, 1975 (aged 68)
- Position: Forward

Senior career*
| Years | Team | Apps | (Gls) |
| | Helsingborgs IF | 516 | (318) |

International career
| 1925-1934 | Sweden | 35 | (18) |
- * Club domestic league appearances and goals

Knut "Knutte" Kroon (19 June 1906 – 27 February 1975) was a Swedish footballer who played as a striker.

Kroon was born in Hälsingborg and began his football career with Stattena IF. In 1925, he joined nearby Helsingborgs IF where he made 516 appearances and scored 318 goals. Kroon won Allsvenskan five times with the club, and retired in 1942.

He made 35 appearances for the national team between 1925 and 1934. He was also a member of the team in the 1934 FIFA World Cup. He scored the winning goal (3-2) in the first round against Argentina. Some sources credit him as the first goalscorer in the history of World Cup preliminary competition, when Sweden scored against Estonia 7 minutes into the game on 11 June 1933, in Stockholm. Some other sources consider that this goal was scored by Estonian goalkeeper Evald Tipner, thus being an own goal.

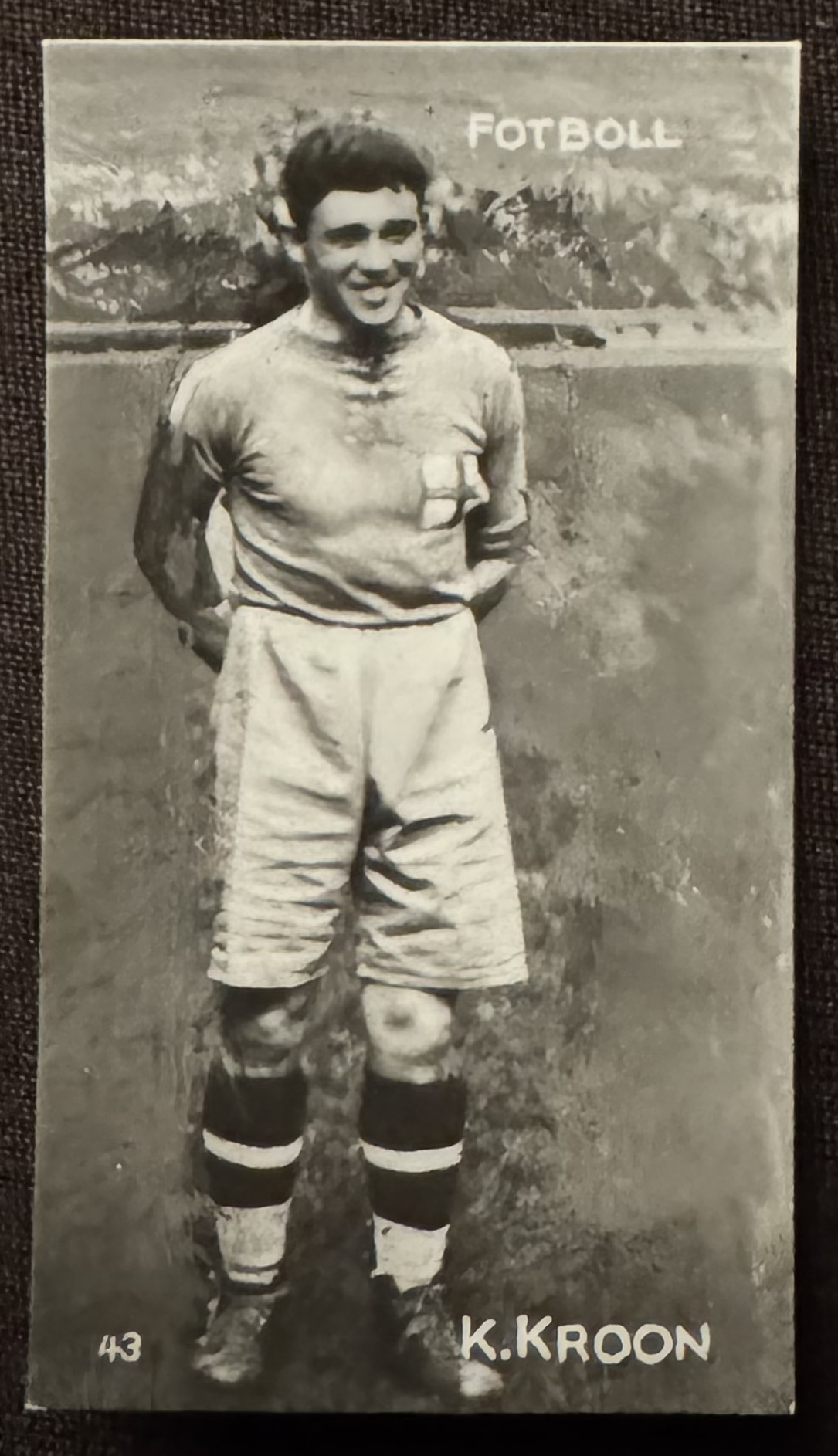
1930 sports card featuring Kroon

He was also part of Sweden's squad at the 1936 Summer Olympics, but did not play in any matches.
