= IFK Västerås =

Swedish football club

- Full name: Idrottsföreningen Kamraterna Västerås
- Founded: 1898; 127 years ago
- Ground: Solid Park Arena, Västerås
- Capacity: 7,000
- Chairman: Björn Bisengård
- Head coach: Azad Kalash
- League: Division 3 Norra Svealand
- 2024: Division 4 Västmanland, 1st of 12
- Website: ifk.nu
| Home colours | Away colours |

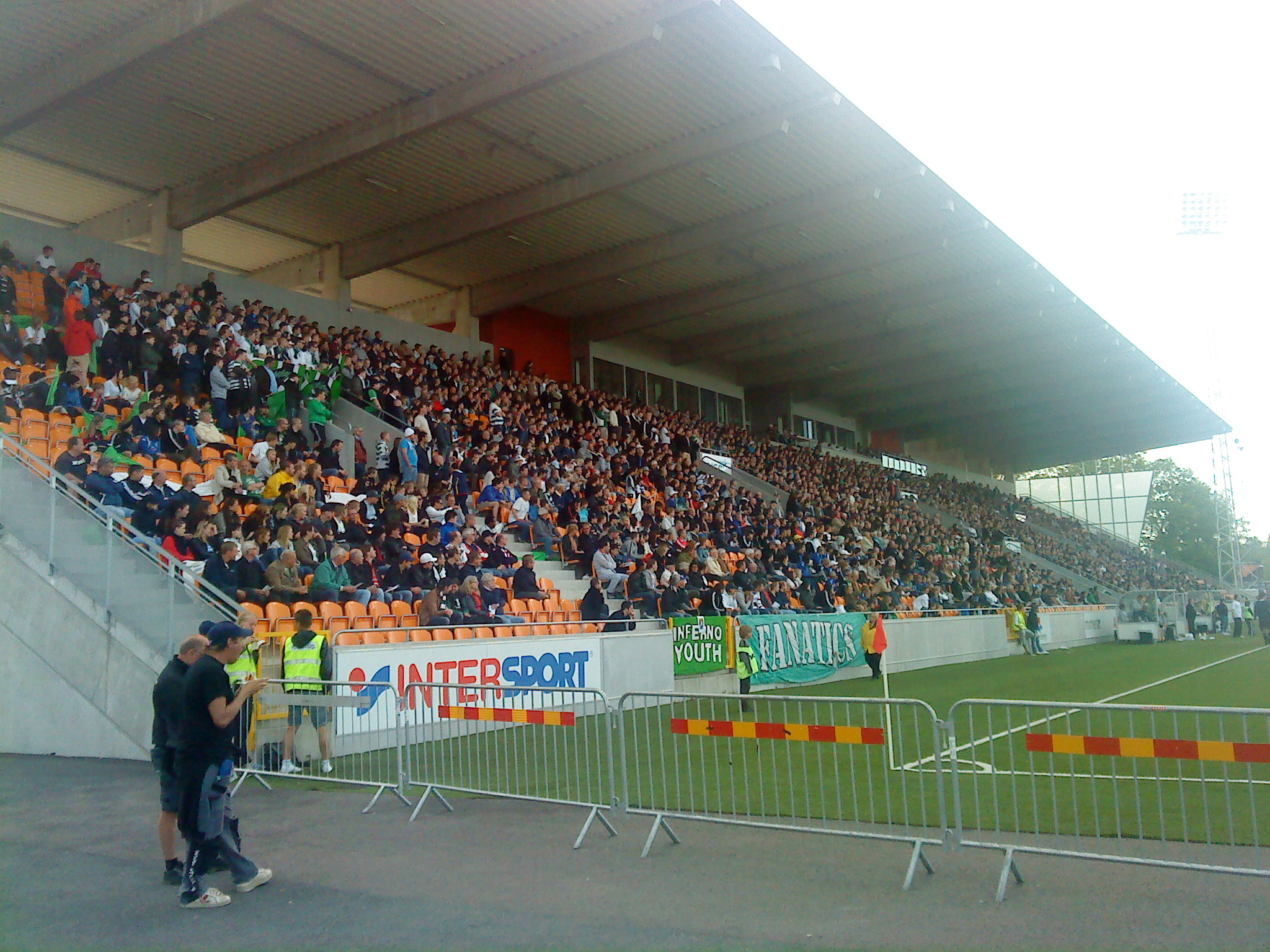
Swedbank Park

Idrottsföreningen Kamraterna Västerås, commonly known as IFK Västerås, or, especially earlier, Västerås-Kamraterna, is a Swedish sports club located in Västerås.

The club currently plays in Division 4 Västmanland which is the sixth tier of Swedish football. They play their home matches at the Swedbank Park in Västerås.

The club is active in football, skiing, figure skating, and bowling. The club has formerly been active in ice hockey, but this section is, as of 2009, inactive.

== History ==
Idrottsföreningen Kamraterna Västerås was first founded in 1898, defunct two years later, to be refounded in 1903 by C. Rudberg and it then recruited its members from Västerås högre allmänna läroverk. The sports club was active in several sports such as athletics, orienteering and Nordic skiing. Among the footballers in the first half of the 20th century were Frans Pettersson, David Jonason, Carl Jonason, Hille Johansson, Helge Andersson, and Sigfrid Roos, while Helmer Måhl represented the club in athletics.

Since their foundation the IFK Västerås football team has participated mainly in the upper and middle divisions of the Swedish football league system. The football team played in series games in Sweden for several seasons in Sweden's next highest division; the first season in 1924–25, and last time in 1987. IFK Västerås are affiliated to the Västmanlands Fotbollförbund.

== Season to season ==
In their early history IFK Västerås competed in the following divisions:

| Season | Level | Division | Section | Position | Movements |
|---|---|---|---|---|---|
| 1924–25 | Tier 2 | Division 2 | Mellansvenska | 6th | |
| 1925–26 | Tier 2 | Division 2 | Mellansvenska | 4th | |
| 1926–27 | Tier 2 | Division 2 | Mellansvenska | 2nd | |
| 1927–28 | Tier 2 | Division 2 | Mellansvenska | 2nd | |
| 1928–29 | Tier 2 | Division 2 | Norra | 7th | |
| 1929–30 | Tier 2 | Division 2 | Norra | 6th | |
| 1930–31 | Tier 2 | Division 2 | Norra | 8th | |
| 1931–32 | Tier 2 | Division 2 | Norra | 4th | |
| 1932–33 | Tier 2 | Division 2 | Norra | 8th | |
| 1933–34 | Tier 2 | Division 2 | Norra | 8th | |
| 1934–35 | Tier 2 | Division 2 | Norra | 2nd | |
| 1935–36 | Tier 2 | Division 2 | Östra | 8th | |
| 1936–37 | Tier 2 | Division 2 | Norra | 4th | |
| 1937–38 | Tier 2 | Division 2 | Östra | 5th | |
| 1938–39 | Tier 2 | Division 2 | Östra | 8th | |
| 1939–40 | Tier 2 | Division 2 | Norra | 8th | |
| 1940–41 | Tier 2 | Division 2 | Östra | 7th | |
| 1941–42 | Tier 2 | Division 2 | Östra | 7th | |
| 1942–43 | Tier 2 | Division 2 | Östra | 8th | |
| 1943–44 | Tier 2 | Division 2 | Östra | 4th | |
| 1944–45 | Tier 2 | Division 2 | Östra | 3rd | |
| 1945–46 | Tier 2 | Division 2 | Norra | 3rd | |
| 1946–47 | Tier 2 | Division 2 | Norra | 5th | |
| 1947–48 | Tier 2 | Division 2 | Nordöstra | 10th | Relegated |
| 1948–49 | Tier 3 | Division 3 | Norra | 9th | Relegated |

In recent seasons IFK Västerås have competed in the following divisions:

| Season | Level | Division | Section | Position | Movements |
|---|---|---|---|---|---|
| 1993 | Tier 3 | Division 2 | Västra Svealand | 2nd | Promotion Playoffs |
| 1994 | Tier 3 | Division 2 | Västra Svealand | 7th | |
| 1995 | Tier 3 | Division 2 | Västra Svealand | 2nd | Promotion Playoffs |
| 1996 | Tier 3 | Division 2 | Västra Svealand | 8th | |
| 1997 | Tier 3 | Division 2 | Västra Svealand | 8th | |
| 1998 | Tier 3 | Division 2 | Västra Svealand | 10th | Relegation Playoffs |
| 1999 | Tier 3 | Division 2 | Västra Svealand | 6th | |
| 2000 | Tier 3 | Division 2 | Västra Svealand | 12th | Relegated |
| 2001 | Tier 4 | Division 3 | Västra Svealand | 9th | Relegation Playoffs |
| 2002 | Tier 4 | Division 3 | Västra Svealand | 11th | Relegated |
| 2003 | Tier 5 | Division 4 | Västmanland | 3rd | |
| 2004 | Tier 5 | Division 4 | Västmanland | 1st | Promoted |
| 2005 | Tier 4 | Division 3 | Östra Svealand | 9th | |
| 2006* | Tier 5 | Division 3 | Västra Svealand | 11th | Relegated |
| 2007 | Tier 6 | Division 4 | Västmanland | 5th | |
| 2008 | Tier 6 | Division 4 | Västmanland | 6th | |
| 2009 | Tier 6 | Division 4 | Västmanland | 2nd | |
| 2010 | Tier 6 | Division 4 | Västmanland | 11th | Relegated |
| 2011 | Tier 7 | Division 5 | Västmanland | 1st | Promoted |
| 2012 | Tier 6 | Division 4 | Västmanland | 4th | |
| 2013 | Tier 6 | Division 4 | Västmanland | 2nd | Promotion Playoffs |
| 2014 | Tier 6 | Division 4 | Västmanland | 2nd | Promotion Playoffs |
| 2015 | Tier 6 | Division 4 | Västmanland | 2nd | Promotion Playoffs |
| 2016 | Tier 6 | Division 4 | Västmanland | 2nd | Promotion Playoffs |
| 2017 | Tier 6 | Division 4 | Västmanland | 4th | |
| 2018 | Tier 6 | Division 4 | Västmanland | 5th | |
| 2019 | Tier 6 | Division 4 | Västmanland | 5th | |
| 2020 | Tier 6 | Division 4 | Västmanland | | |

* League restructuring in 2006 resulted in a new division being created at Tier 3 and subsequent divisions dropping a level.

== Attendances ==
In recent seasons IFK Västerås have had the following average attendances:

| Season | Average attendance | Division / Section | Level |
|---|---|---|---|
| 2005 | 121 | Div 3 Östra Svealand | Tier 4 |
| 2006 | 80 | Div 3 Västra Svealand | Tier 5 |
| 2007 | Not available | Div 4 Västmanland | Tier 6 |
| 2008 | Not available | Div 4 Västmanland | Tier 6 |
| 2009 | 70 | Div 4 Västmanland | Tier 6 |
| 2010 | 45 | Div 4 Västmanland | Tier 6 |
| 2011 | ? | Div 5 Västmanland | Tier 7 |
| 2012 | 66 | Div 4 Västmanland | Tier 6 |
| 2013 | 75 | Div 4 Västmanland | Tier 6 |
| 2014 | 89 | Div 4 Västmanland | Tier 6 |
| 2015 | 78 | Div 4 Västmanland | Tier 6 |
| 2016 | 71 | Div 4 Västmanland | Tier 6 |
| 2017 | 78 | Div 4 Västmanland | Tier 6 |
| 2018 | 60 | Div 4 Västmanland | Tier 6 |
| 2019 | | Div 4 Västmanland | Tier 6 |
| 2020 | | Div 4 Västmanland | Tier 6 |

* Attendances are provided in the Publikliga sections of the Svenska Fotbollförbundet website.
