= Sandvikens AIK Fotboll =

Swedish football club

Sandvikens AIK FK
- Full name: Sandvikens Allmänna Idrottsklubb Fotbollklubb
- Founded: March 16, 1901; 125 years ago as IF Stjärnan
- Ground: Arena Jernvallen; Sandviken; Sweden
- Capacity: 7,000
- League: Division 2 Norra Svealand
- 2019: 3rd
- Website: http://www.saikfotboll.se/
| Home colours | Away colours |

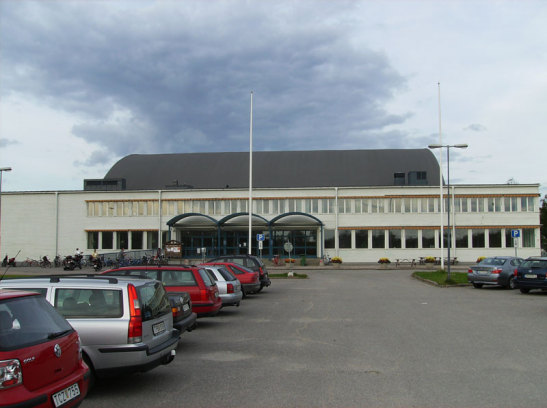
Jernvallen

Sandvikens AIK FK is a Swedish football club located in Sandviken.

== Background ==
Sandvikens AIK FK currently plays in Division 4 Gestrikland which is the sixth tier of Swedish football. In 1954–55 season the club played in the Allsvenskan. They play their home matches at the Arena Jernvallen in Sandviken.

The club is affiliated to Gestriklands Fotbollförbund.

== Achievements ==
=== League ===
Best position: 12th place in Allsvenskan in 1955

1st in Division 2: 1913, 1954

1st in Division 3 (4 times): 1929, 1939, 1961, 1992

1st District Series (5 times): 1981, 1985, 1999, 2003, 2008

=== Cup ===
Quarter-Finalist in the Svenska Cupen (9 times): 1912, 1914, 1915, 1916, 1917, 1919, 1920, 1923, 1924

1st in Distriktsmästerskapet (District Championship) (19 times): 1907, 1908, 1912, 1913, 1915, 1916, 1917, 1919, 1920, 1922, 1924, 1926, 1929, 1940, 1944, 1945, 1946, 1951, 1961

== Club history ==
1901–1904 – did not participate in the league

1905–1908 – Gävleserien

1909–1910 – did not participate in the league

1911–1913 – Gävleserien

1913–1917 – Div 2 Uppsvenskan

1918–1922 – did not participate in the league

1923–1928 – Div 2 Uppsvenskan

1928–1929 – Div 3 Uppsvenskan

1929–1933 – Div 2 Norra

1933–1934 – Div 3 Uppsvenskan

1934–1939 – Div 3 Uppsvenskan, västra

1939–1947 – Div 2 Norra

1947–1952 – Div 2 Nordöstra

1952–1953 – Div 3 Norra

1953–1954 – Div 2 Norrland

1954–1955 – Allsvenskan

1955–1956 – Div 2 Norrland

1956–1960 – Div 3 Södra Norrland

1961 – Div 3 Norra Svealand

1962–1964 – Div 2 Svealand

1965–1967 – Div 2 Norrland

1968–1971 – Div 3 Södra Norrland, nedre

1972–1975 – Div 3 Norra Svealand

1976–1979 – Div 3 Södra Norrland

1980–1985 – Div 4 Gästrikland

1986–1990 – Div 3 Södra Norrland

Vår 1991 – Div 2 Södra Norrland

Höst 1991 – Div 2 Norrland

Vår 1992 – Div 3 Södra Norrland B

1992–1994 – Div 3 Södra Norrland

1995–1999 – Div 4 Gästrikland

2000 – Div 3 Norra Svealand

2001–2002 – Div 3 Södra Norrland

2003 – Div 4 Gästrikland

2004–2005 – Div 3 Södra Norrland

2006–2008 – Div 4 Gästrikland

2009 – Div 3 Norra Svealand

2010 – Div 4 Gestrikland
