= Sigfrid Lindberg =

Swedish footballer

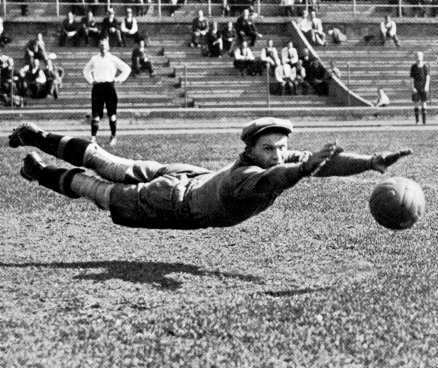
- Sigfrid Lindberg

Personal information
- Born: 25 March 1897 Helsingborg, Sweden
- Died: 4 January 1977 (aged 79) Helsingborg, Sweden
- Height: 190 cm (6 ft 3 in)
- Weight: 85 kg (187 lb)

Sport
- Sport: Football
- Club: Helsingborgs IF
Medal record
Representing Sweden
Olympic Games
Bronze medal – third place	1924 Paris	Team

Sigfrid Oskar "Sigge" Lindberg (25 March 1897 – 4 January 1977) was a Swedish footballer who played as a goalkeeper who won a bronze medal at the 1924 Summer Olympics. Between 1921 and 1930 he played 49 international matches.
