= 1932–33 in Swedish football =

The 1932–33 season in Swedish football, starting August 1932 and ending July 1933:

== Honours ==
=== Official titles ===
Title	Team	Reason
1932–33 Swedish Champions	Helsingborgs IF	Winners of Allsvenskan

=== Competitions ===
Level	Competition	Team
1st level	Allsvenskan 1932–33	Helsingborgs IF
2nd level	Division 2 Norra 1932–33	Gefle IF
2nd level	Division 2 Östra 1932–33	IFK Norrköping
2nd level	Division 2 Västra 1932–33	Krokslätts FF
2nd level	Division 2 Södra 1932–33	Halmstads BK

== Promotions, relegations and qualifications ==
=== Promotions ===
Promoted from	Promoted to	Team	Reason
Division 2 Norra 1932–33	Allsvenskan 1933–34	Gefle IF	Winners of promotion play-off
Division 2 Södra 1932–33	Allsvenskan 1933–34	Halmstads BK	Winners of promotion play-off
Division 3 1932–33	Division 2 Norra 1933–34	Ljusne AIK	Winners of Uppsvenska
Division 3 1932–33	Division 2 Norra 1933–34	IFK Örebro	Winners of Nordvästra
Division 3 1932–33	Division 2 Norra 1933–34	Örebro SK	Winners of Mellansvenska
Division 3 1932–33	Division 2 Östra 1933–34	Sundbybergs IK	Winners of Östsvenska
Division 3 1932–33	Division 2 Västra 1933–34	Gårda BK	Winners of Västsvenska
Division 3 1932–33	Division 2 Västra 1933–34	Husqvarna IF	Winners of Södra Mellansvenska
Division 3 1932–33	Division 2 Södra 1933–34	IFK Helsingborg	Winners of Sydsvenska
Division 3 1932–33	Division 2 Södra 1933–34	Lessebo GoIF	Winners of Sydöstra

=== Relegations ===
Relegated from	Relegated to	Team	Reason
Allsvenskan 1932–33	Division 2 Östra 1933–34	IK Sleipner	11th team
Allsvenskan 1932–33	Division 2 Södra 1932–33	Landskrona BoIS	12th team
Division 2 Norra 1932–33	Division 3 1933–34	Sandvikens AIK	9th team
Division 2 Norra 1932–33	Division 3 1933–34	Örebro IK	10th team
Division 2 Östra 1932–33	Division 3 1933–34	Westermalms IF	9th team
Division 2 Östra 1932–33	Division 3 1933–34	IK City	10th team
Division 2 Västra 1932–33	Division 3 1933–34	Majornas IK	9th team
Division 2 Västra 1932–33	Division 3 1933–34	Degerfors IF	10th team
Division 2 Södra 1932–33	Division 3 1933–34	Kalmar AIK	9th team
Division 2 Södra 1932–33	Division 3 1933–34	IFK Karlshamn	10th team

== Domestic results ==
=== Allsvenskan 1932–33 ===

	Team	Pld	W	D	L	GF		GA	GD	Pts
1	Helsingborgs IF	22	16	3	3	68	–	38	+30	35
2	GAIS	22	16	2	4	70	–	30	+40	34
3	IFK Göteborg	22	11	3	8	58	–	42	+16	25
4	AIK	22	11	2	9	60	–	40	20	24
5	Örgryte IS	22	9	2	11	40	–	43	-3	20
6	IFK Eskilstuna	22	9	2	11	47	–	55	-8	20
7	Sandvikens IF	22	7	5	10	43	–	48	-5	19
8	IF Elfsborg	22	8	3	11	44	–	54	-10	19
9	Malmö FF	22	8	3	11	42	–	66	-24	19
10	IS Halmia	22	7	3	12	34	–	50	-16	17
11	IK Sleipner	22	7	3	12	34	–	52	-18	17
12	Landskrona BoIS	22	6	3	13	38	–	60	-22	15

=== Allsvenskan promotion play-off 1932–33 ===
June 5, 1933

Gefle IF	3–1	IFK Norrköping

?, Gävle
June 11, 1933

IFK Norrköping	2–4	Gefle IF

?, Norrköping

June 5, 1933

Krokslätts FF	0–1	Halmstads BK

?, Mölndal
June 11, 1933

Halmstads BK	3–0	Krokslätts FF

?, Halmstad

=== Division 2 Norra 1932–33 ===

	Team	Pld	W	D	L	GF		GA	GD	Pts
1	Gefle IF	18	13	2	3	65	–	24	+41	28
2	IK Brage	18	13	1	4	58	–	28	+30	27
3	Hallstahammars SK	18	8	4	6	31	–	32	-1	20
4	Surahammars IF	18	7	6	5	26	–	27	-1	20
5	IFK Kumla	18	8	3	7	32	–	34	-2	19
6	IFK Grängesberg	18	6	2	10	37	–	51	-14	14
7	Brynäs IF	18	6	2	10	22	–	49	-27	14
8	IFK Västerås	18	5	3	10	32	–	36	-4	13
9	Sandvikens AIK	18	6	1	11	26	–	45	-19	13
10	Örebro IK	18	4	4	10	31	–	34	-3	12

=== Division 2 Östra 1932–33 ===
	Team	Pld	W	D	L	GF		GA	GD	Pts
1	IFK Norrköping	18	12	2	4	63	–	29	+34	26
2	Hammarby IF	18	10	5	3	45	–	25	+20	25
3	Djurgårdens IF	18	9	6	3	38	–	29	+9	24
4	Åtvidabergs IF	18	7	3	8	42	–	47	-5	17
5	Mjölby AI	18	6	5	7	38	–	49	-11	17
6	Motala AIF	18	7	2	9	42	–	37	+5	16
7	Reymersholms IK	18	5	6	7	28	–	42	-14	16
8	BK Derby	18	5	5	8	29	–	38	-9	15
9	Westermalms IF	18	5	3	10	36	–	41	-5	13
10	IK City	18	3	5	10	24	–	48	-24	11

=== Division 2 Västra 1932–33 ===
	Team	Pld	W	D	L	GF		GA	GD	Pts
1	Krokslätts FF	18	13	2	3	59	–	33	+26	28
2	Jonsereds IF	18	11	2	5	48	–	31	+17	24
3	Billingsfors IK	18	10	3	5	49	–	35	+14	23
4	IFK Uddevalla	18	9	3	6	50	–	35	+15	21
5	Fässbergs IF	18	8	3	7	47	–	40	+7	19
6	Surte IS	18	8	2	8	39	–	46	-7	18
7	Slottsbrons IF	18	6	4	8	34	–	41	-7	16
8	Karlskoga IF	18	5	4	9	25	–	33	-8	14
9	Majornas IK	18	3	3	12	23	–	46	-23	9
10	Degerfors IF	18	4	0	14	29	–	63	-34	8

=== Division 2 Södra 1932–33 ===
	Team	Pld	W	D	L	GF		GA	GD	Pts
1	Halmstads BK	18	14	1	3	56	–	26	+26	29
2	BK Drott	18	11	3	4	49	–	32	+17	25
3	IFK Malmö	18	9	4	5	57	–	47	+10	22
4	Lunds BK	18	10	1	7	62	–	42	+20	21
5	Stattena IF	18	8	5	5	39	–	41	-2	21
6	Kalmar FF	18	5	5	8	45	–	45	0	15
7	Malmö BI	18	6	3	9	33	–	43	-10	15
8	Höganäs BK	18	4	5	9	33	–	45	-12	13
9	Kalmar AIK	18	5	1	12	25	–	46	-21	11
10	IFK Karlshamn	18	2	4	12	27	–	65	-38	8

== National team results ==
September 25, 1932
Friendly
№ 171

Sweden	8–1	Lithuania
Gustavsson 11', 78'; Johansson-Jernsten 48', 52'; Nilsson 59', 60', 65', 75'		Efišovas 49'

Stockholms Stadion, Stockholm
Attendance: 15,000
Referee: Tuhkunen (Finland)

Sweden: Sture Hult - Herbert Samuelsson, Sven Andersson - Helge Liljebjörn, Nils Rosén, Einar Snitt - Gösta Dunker, Ragnar Gustavsson, John "Lång-John" Nilsson, Holger Johansson-Jernsten, Knut Kroon.

September 25, 1932
Friendly
№ 172

Germany	4–3	Sweden
Rohr 10', 66'; Kobierski 17'; Krumm 40'		Lundahl 22'; Kempe 47'; Persson 78'

Nürnberger Stadion, Nuremberg
Attendance: 30,000
Referee: Barlassina (Italy)

Sweden: Einar Jonasson - Otto Andersson, Erik Lager - Hugo Sjögren, Victor Carlund, Carl Johnsson - John "Jompa" Nilsson, Erik "Lillis" Persson, Harry Lundahl, Einar Kempe, Gösta Svensson.

November 6, 1932
Friendly
№ 173

Switzerland	2–1	Sweden
Abegglen 67', 87'		Olsson 7'

Stadion Rankhof, Basel
Attendance: 22,000
Referee: Baert (Belgium)

Sweden: Gösta Krusberg - Herbert Samuelsson, Sven Andersson - Hugo Sjögren, Victor Carlund, Ernst Andersson - Gunnar Olsson, Ragnar Gustavsson, Harry Lundahl, John Sundberg, Knut Kroon.

June 11, 1933
1934 World Cup qualification
№ 174

Sweden	6–2	Estonia
Kroon 7'; L. Bunke 10'; Ericsson 13', 70'; T. Bunke 43'; Andersson 79' (pen.)		Kass 47'; Kuremaa 61'

Stockholms Stadion, Stockholm
Attendance: 8,123
Referee: Randers-Johansen (Norway)

Sweden: Gösta Krusberg - Otto Andersson, Sven Andersson - Walfrid Persson, Harry Johansson, Ernst Andersson - Gunnar Olsson, Torsten Bunke, Bertil Ericsson, Lennart Bunke, Knut Kroon.

June 18, 1933
1933–36 Nordic Championship
№ 175

Sweden	2–3	Denmark
Ericsson 9', 20'		Jørgensen 27'; Kleven 53', 74'

Stockholms Stadion, Stockholm
Attendance: 20,297
Referee: Wunderlin (Switzerland)

Sweden: Gösta Krusberg - Otto Andersson, Sven Andersson - Walfrid Persson, Harry Johansson, Ernst Andersson - Gunnar Olsson, Torsten Bunke, Bertil Ericsson, Lennart Bunke, Knut Kroon.

June 29, 1933
1934 World Cup qualification
№ 176

Lithuania	0–2	Sweden
		Hansson 55', 65'

Kariuomenės stadionas, Kaunas
Attendance: 6,000
Referee: Silber (Estonia)

Sweden: Gottfrid Carlsson - Otto Andersson, Sven Andersson - Fritz Berg, Victor Carlund, Helge Lundén - Gunnar Olsson, Gunnar Rydberg, Knut Hansson, Tore Keller, Evert Hansson.

July 2, 1933
Friendly
№ 177

Sweden	5–2	Hungary
"Lillis" Persson 49'; Karlsson 56'; Bunke 58', 89'; Nilsson 65'		Sárosi 20'; Toldi 58'

Stockholms Stadion, Stockholm
Attendance: 18,569
Referee: Hansen (Denmark)

Sweden: Anders Rydberg - Nils Axelsson, Arne Johansson - Hugo Sjögren, Harry Johansson, Erik "Krassi" Persson - John "Jompa" Nilsson, Erik "Lillis" Persson, Holger Karlsson, Lennart Bunke, Knut Kroon.

July 4, 1933
Friendly
№ 178

Latvia	1–1	Sweden
Pētersons 70'		Hansson 39'

JKS Stadions, Riga
Attendance: 4,000
Referee: Balčiūnas (Lithuania)

Sweden: Gottfrid Carlsson - Otto Andersson, Sven Andersson - Fritz Berg, Victor Carlund, Helge Lundén - Gunnar Olsson, Gunnar Rydberg, Knut Hansson, Tore Keller, Evert Hansson.

July 14, 1933
1933–36 Nordic Championship
№ 179

Sweden	2–0	Finland
Kroon 58' (pen.); Bunke 86'

Stockholms Stadion, Stockholm
Attendance: 15,246
Referee: Yssing (Denmark)

Sweden: Anders Rydberg - Nils Axelsson, Arne Johansson - Hugo Sjögren, Harry Johansson, Helge Lundén - John "Jompa" Nilsson, Erik "Lillis" Persson, Holger Karlsson, Lennart Bunke, Knut Kroon.

== National team players in season 1932/33 ==
Name	Pos.	Caps	Goals	Club
Ernst Andersson	MF	3	0	IFK Göteborg
Otto Andersson	DF	5	0	Örgryte IS
Sven "Vrålis" Andersson	DF	6	1	AIK
Nils Axelsson	DF	2	0	Hälsingborgs IF
Fritz Berg	MF	2	0	IFK Göteborg
Lennart "Ledde" Bunke	FW	4	4	Hälsingborgs IF
Torsten "Totte" Bunke	FW	2	1	Hälsingborgs IF
Gottfrid Carlsson	GK	2	0	Örgryte IS
Victor Carlund	MF	4	0	Örgryte IS
Gösta Dunker	FW	1	0	Sandvikens IF
Bertil Ericsson	FW	2	4	Sandvikens IF
Ragnar Gustavsson	FW	2	2	GAIS
Evert "Sperling" Hansson	FW	2	0	Örgryte IS
Knut "Buckla" Hansson	FW	2	3	Landskrona BoIS
Sture Hult	GK	1	0	IFK Eskilstuna
Arne "Tysken" Johansson	DF	2	0	Hälsingborgs IF
Harry "Båten" Johansson	MF	4	0	GAIS
Holger Johansson-Jernsten	FW	1	2	GAIS
Carl (Karl) Johnsson	MF	1	0	GAIS
Einar Jonasson	GK	1	0	IF Elfsborg
Holger "Hogga" Karlsson	FW	2	1	Gefle IF
Tore Keller	FW	2	0	IK Sleipner
Einar Kempe	FW	1	1	IFK Eskilstuna
Knut "Knutte" Kroon	FW	6	2	Hälsingborgs IF
Gösta "Hummern" Krusberg	GK	3	0	IS Halmia
Erik Lager	DF	1	0	IF Elfsborg
Helge Liljebjörn	MF	1	0	GAIS
Harry Lundahl	FW	2	1	IFK Eskilstuna
Helge Lundén	MF	3	0	IS Halmia
John "Jompa" Nilsson	FW	3	1	AIK
John "Lång-John" Nilsson	FW	1	4	GAIS
Gunnar Olsson	FW	5	1	GAIS
Erik "Krassi" Persson	MF	1	0	Hälsingborgs IF
Erik "Lillis" Persson	FW	3	2	AIK
Walfrid "Valle" Persson	MF	2	0	Sandvikens IF
Nils "Rossi" Rosén	MF	1	0	Hälsingborgs IF
Anders Rydberg	GK	2	0	IFK Göteborg
Gunnar "Lillen" Rydberg	FW	2	0	IFK Göteborg
Herbert Samuelsson	DF	2	0	IS Halmia
Hugo "Hugge" Sjögren	MF	4	0	AIK
Einar Snitt	MF	1	0	Sandvikens IF
John Sundberg	FW	1	0	Åtvidabergs IF
Gösta "Saxofonen" Svensson	FW	1	0	GAIS
