= 1934–35 in Swedish football =

The 1934–35 season in Swedish football, starting August 1934 and ending July 1935:

== Honours ==
=== Official titles ===
Title	Team	Reason
1934–35 Swedish Champions	IFK Göteborg	Winners of Allsvenskan

=== Competitions ===
Level	Competition	Team
1st level	Allsvenskan 1934–35	IFK Göteborg
2nd level	Division 2 Norra 1934–35	IK Brage
2nd level	Division 2 Östra 1934–35	IFK Norrköping
2nd level	Division 2 Västra 1934–35	Gårda BK
2nd level	Division 2 Södra 1934–35	Malmö FF

== Promotions, relegations and qualifications ==
=== Promotions ===
Promoted from	Promoted to	Team	Reason
Division 2 Östra 1934–35	Allsvenskan 1935–36	IFK Norrköping	Winners of promotion play-off
Division 2 Västra 1934–35	Allsvenskan 1935–36	Gårda BK	Winners of promotion play-off
Division 3 1934–35	Division 2 Norra 1935–36	IFK Örebro	Winners of Mellansvenska
Division 3 1934–35	Division 2 Norra 1935–36	Fagersta AIK	Winners of promotion play-off
Division 3 1934–35	Division 2 Östra 1935–36	Skärblacka IF	Winners of Södra Mellansvenska
Division 3 1934–35	Division 2 Östra 1935–36	Värtans IK	Winners of Östsvenska
Division 3 1934–35	Division 2 Västra 1935–36	IFK Kristinehamn	Winners of Nordvästra
Division 3 1934–35	Division 2 Västra 1935–36	Alingsås IF	Losers of promotion play-off
Division 3 1934–35	Division 2 Södra 1935–36	IFK Kristianstad	Winners of Sydsvenska
Division 3 1934–35	Division 2 Södra 1935–36	Lessebo GoIF	Winners of Sydöstra

=== League transfers ===
Transferred from	Transferred to	Team	Reason
Division 2 Norra 1934–35	Division 2 Östra 1935–36	IFK Västerås	Geographical composition
Division 2 Södra 1934–35	Division 2 Västra 1935–36	IFK Värnamo	Geographical composition

=== Relegations ===
Relegated from	Relegated to	Team	Reason
Allsvenskan 1934–35	Division 2 Södra 1935–36	Helsingborgs IF	11th team
Allsvenskan 1934–35	Division 2 Norra 1935–36	Gefle IF	12th team
Division 2 Norra 1934–35	Division 3 1935–36	IF Rune	9th team
Division 2 Norra 1934–35	Division 3 1935–36	IFK Grängesberg	10th team
Division 2 Östra 1934–35	Division 3 1935–36	Åtvidabergs IF	9th team
Division 2 Östra 1934–35	Division 3 1935–36	Kalmar FF	10th team
Division 2 Västra 1934–35	Division 3 1935–36	IFK Uddevalla	9th team
Division 2 Västra 1934–35	Division 3 1935–36	Slottsbrons IF	10th team
Division 2 Södra 1934–35	Division 3 1935–36	Stattena IF	9th team
Division 2 Södra 1934–35	Division 3 1935–36	Lunds BK	10th team

== Domestic results ==
=== Allsvenskan 1934–35 ===

	Team	Pld	W	D	L	GF		GA	GD	Pts
1	IFK Göteborg	22	15	3	4	48	–	22	+26	33
2	AIK	22	11	6	5	59	–	28	+31	28
3	IF Elfsborg	22	13	2	7	59	–	43	+16	28
4	Sandvikens IF	22	12	4	6	46	–	46	0	28
5	GAIS	22	10	4	8	44	–	49	-5	24
6	Landskrona BoIS	22	10	2	10	47	–	47	0	22
7	IK Sleipner	22	9	3	10	55	–	49	+6	21
8	Örgryte IS	22	9	2	11	40	–	42	-2	20
9	Halmstads BK	22	7	5	10	33	–	39	-6	19
10	IFK Eskilstuna	22	7	4	11	37	–	52	-15	18
11	Helsingborgs IF	22	5	5	12	40	–	49	-9	15
12	Gefle IF	22	2	4	16	37	–	79	-42	8

=== Allsvenskan promotion play-off 1934–35 ===
June 10, 1935

IK Brage	2–3	IFK Norrköping

?, Borlänge
June 16, 1935

IFK Norrköping	1–0	IK Brage

?, Norrköping

June 10, 1935

Malmö FF	3–1	Gårda BK

?, Malmö
June 16, 1935

Gårda BK	2–1	Malmö FF

?, Gothenburg
June 21, 1935

Malmö FF	0–2	Gårda BK

?, Stockholm

=== Division 2 Norra 1934–35 ===

	Team	Pld	W	D	L	GF		GA	GD	Pts
1	IK Brage	18	16	0	2	69	–	27	+42	32
2	IFK Västerås	18	9	4	5	46	–	38	+8	22
3	Örebro SK	18	9	3	6	39	–	29	+10	21
4	Hallstahammars SK	18	7	6	5	32	–	30	+2	20
5	Ljusne AIK	18	8	1	9	37	–	32	+5	17
6	Surahammars IF	18	6	5	7	31	–	33	-2	17
7	IFK Kumla	18	6	2	10	35	–	50	-15	14
8	Bollnäs GIF	18	5	4	9	23	–	47	-24	14
9	IF Rune	18	6	1	11	30	–	44	-14	13
10	IFK Grängesberg	18	3	4	11	26	–	38	-12	10

=== Division 2 Östra 1934–35 ===
	Team	Pld	W	D	L	GF		GA	GD	Pts
1	IFK Norrköping	18	12	2	4	68	–	29	+39	26
2	Mjölby AI	18	9	4	5	34	–	27	+7	22
3	Hammarby IF	18	7	7	4	32	–	25	+7	21
4	Djurgårdens IF	18	7	4	7	30	–	20	+10	18
5	BK Derby	18	7	3	8	27	–	35	-8	17
6	Västerviks AIS	18	8	1	9	27	–	44	-17	17
7	Sundbybergs IK	18	6	4	8	36	–	39	-3	16
8	Årsta SK	18	6	4	8	38	–	45	-7	16
9	Åtvidabergs IF	18	6	2	10	31	–	45	-14	14
10	Kalmar FF	18	5	3	10	32	–	46	-14	13

=== Division 2 Västra 1934–35 ===
	Team	Pld	W	D	L	GF		GA	GD	Pts
1	Gårda BK	18	14	2	2	39	–	15	+24	30
2	Karlskoga IF	18	11	4	3	53	–	21	+32	26
3	Billingsfors IK	18	9	4	5	33	–	21	+12	22
4	Jonsereds IF	18	9	3	6	38	–	36	+2	21
5	Fässbergs IF	18	9	1	8	27	–	23	+4	19
6	Husqvarna IF	18	6	4	8	30	–	40	-10	16
7	Landala IF	18	6	4	8	24	–	40	-16	16
8	Degerfors IF	18	7	1	10	30	–	57	-27	15
9	IFK Uddevalla	18	4	2	12	28	–	42	-14	10
10	Slottsbrons IF	18	2	1	15	19	–	46	-27	5

=== Division 2 Södra 1934–35 ===
	Team	Pld	W	D	L	GF		GA	GD	Pts
1	Malmö FF	18	13	5	0	66	–	21	+45	31
2	IS Halmia	18	11	5	2	44	–	16	+28	27
3	IFK Malmö	18	10	2	6	43	–	39	+4	22
4	IFK Helsingborg	18	9	1	8	49	–	36	+13	19
5	Ängelholms IF	18	6	7	5	33	–	32	+1	19
6	Höganäs BK	18	6	5	7	41	–	32	+9	17
7	Malmö BI	18	6	5	7	29	–	31	-2	17
8	IFK Värnamo	18	6	3	19	29	–	40	-11	15
9	Stattena IF	18	5	3	10	19	–	44	-25	13
10	Lunds BK	18	0	0	18	18	–	80	-62	0

=== Division 2 promotion play-off 1934–35 ===
June 10, 1935

Skärgårdens IF	0–1	Fagersta AIK

?, ?
June 16, 1935

Fagersta AIK	5–0	Skärgårdens IF

?, ?

June 16, 1935

Oskarströms IF	2–0	Alingsås IF

?, ?
June 23, 1935

Alingsås IF	1–3	Oskarströms IF

?, ?

== National team results ==
September 23, 1934
Friendly
№ 186

Sweden	3–1	Latvia
Andersson 64' (p); Carlsson 84'; Gustavsson 89'		Jēnihs 4'

Stockholms Stadion, Stockholm
Attendance: 16,000
Referee: Dreiø (Denmark)

Sweden: Axel Ohlsson - Otto Andersson, Sven Andersson - Fritz Berg, Nils Rosén, Ernst Andersson - Roger Carlsson, Ragnar Gustavsson, Knut Hansson, Sven Jonasson, Gunnar Jansson.

September 23, 1934
1933–36 Nordic Championship
№ 187

Finland	5–4	Sweden
Koponen 2', 21'; Lintamo-Lindgren 33, 50'; Åström 49'		Persson 6', 42', 87'; Keller 59'

Tölö bollplan, Helsinki
Attendance: 10,370
Referee: Remke (Denmark)

Sweden: Anders Rydberg - Nils Axelsson, Harry Zachrisson - Victor Carlund, Gunnar Löfgren, Einar Snitt - Helge Johnsson, Erik Persson, Bertil Ericsson, Tore Keller, Gustav Wetterström.

June 12, 1935
1933–36 Nordic Championship
№ 188

Sweden	2–2	Finland
Persson 46'; Nyberg 80'		Weckström 10', 75'

Stockholms Stadion, Stockholm
Attendance: 15,000
Referee: Kristiansen (Norway)

Sweden: Sven Bergquist - Nils Axelsson, Sven Andersson - Fritz Berg, Arthur Karlsson, Ernst Andersson - Emil Karlsson, Erik Persson, Arne Nyberg, Sven Jonasson, Åke Hallman.

June 16, 1935
1933–36 Nordic Championship
№ 189

Sweden	3–1	Denmark
Grahn 44'; Jonasson 54'; Hallman 83'		Jørgensen 35'

Ullevi, Gothenburg
Attendance: 28,336
Referee: Fogg (England)

Sweden: Anders Rydberg - Nils Axelsson, Sven Andersson - Fritz Berg, Arvid Emanuelsson, Ernst Andersson - Curt Bergsten, Erik Persson, Sven Jonasson, Karl-Erik Grahn, Åke Hallman.

June 30, 1935
Friendly
№ 190

Sweden	3–1	Germany
Hallman 20', 50'; Jonasson 59'		Rohwedder 89'

Stockholms Stadion, Stockholm
Attendance: 20,000
Referee: Ulrich (Denmark)

Sweden: Sven Bergquist - Nils Axelsson, Sven Andersson - Fritz Berg, Bengt Essman, Ernst Andersson - Roger Carlsson, Erik Persson, Sven Jonasson, Karl-Erik Grahn, Åke Hallman.

July 5, 1935
Friendly
№ 191

Latvia	0–3	Sweden
		Carlsson 35'; Jonasson 43'; Samuelsson 75'

JKS Stadions, Riga
Attendance: 9,000
Referee: Boronkay (Hungary)

Sweden: Sven Bergquist - Nils Axelsson, Olle Hultfeldt - Henning Pettersson, Bengt Essman, Einar Snitt - Roger Carlsson, Åke Samuelsson, Sven Jonasson, Karl-Erik Grahn, Åke Hallman.

July 9, 1935
Friendly
№ 192

Estonia	1–2	Sweden
Ellman-Eelma 63'		Samuelsson 15', 17'

Kadriorg Stadium, Tallinn
Attendance: 6,000
Referee: Aalto (Finland)

Sweden: Sven Bergquist - Nils Axelsson, Walter Sköld - Henning Pettersson, Bengt Essman, Einar Snitt - Roger Carlsson, Åke Samuelsson, Sven Jonasson, Karl-Erik Grahn, Åke Hallman.

== National team players in season 1934–35 ==
Name	Pos.	Caps	Goals	Club
Ernst Andersson	MF	4	0	IFK Göteborg
Otto Andersson	DF	1	0	Örgryte IS
Sven "Vrålis" Andersson	DF	4	1	AIK
Nils Axelsson	DF	6	0	Hälsingborgs IF
Fritz Berg	MF	4	0	IFK Göteborg
Sven "Svenne Berka" Bergquist (Bergqvist)	GK	4	0	Hammarby IF
Curt (Kurt) Bergsten	FW	1	0	Landskrona BoIS
Roger Carlsson	FW	4	2	IFK Eskilstuna
Victor Carlund	MF	1	0	Örgryte IS
Arvid "Emma" Emanuelsson	MF	1	0	IF Elfsborg
Bertil Ericsson	FW	1	0	Sandvikens IF
Bengt Essman	MF	3	0	IFK Eskilstuna
Karl-Erik Grahn	FW	4	1	IF Elfsborg
Ragnar Gustavsson	FW	1	1	GAIS
Åke Hallman	FW	5	3	IF Elfsborg
Knut "Buckla" Hansson	FW	1	0	IS Halmia
Olle Hultfeldt	DF	1	0	IFK Göteborg
Gunnar Jansson	FW	1	0	Gefle IF
Helge Johnsson	FW	1	0	IFK Göteborg
Sven "Jonas" Jonasson	FW	6	3	IF Elfsborg
Arthur Karlsson	MF	1	0	Landskrona BoIS
Emil Karlsson	FW	1	0	Halmstads BK
Tore Keller	FW	1	1	IK Sleipner
Gunnar Löfgren	MF	1	0	IFK Göteborg
Arne Nyberg	FW	1	1	IFK Göteborg
Axel Ohlsson	GK	1	0	IF Elfsborg
Erik "Lillis" Persson	FW	4	4	AIK
Henning Pettersson	MF	2	0	Landskrona BoIS
Nils "Rossi" Rosén	MF	1	0	Hälsingborgs IF
Anders Rydberg	GK	2	0	IFK Göteborg
Åke Samuelsson	FW	2	3	IF Elfsborg
Walter Sköld	DF	1	0	AIK
Einar Snitt	MF	3	0	Sandvikens IF
Gustav "Gutta" Wetterström	FW	1	0	IK Sleipner
Harry Zachrisson	DF	1	0	Örgryte IS
