= 1935–36 in Swedish football =

The 1935–36 season in Swedish football, starting August 1935 and ending July 1936:

== Honours ==
=== Official titles ===
Title	Team	Reason
1935–36 Swedish Champions	IF Elfsborg	Winners of Allsvenskan

=== Competitions ===
Level	Competition	Team
1st level	Allsvenskan 1935–36	IF Elfsborg
2nd level	Division 2 Norra 1935–36	Hallstahammars SK
2nd level	Division 2 Östra 1935–36	Djurgårdens IF
2nd level	Division 2 Västra 1935–36	Billingsfors IK
2nd level	Division 2 Södra 1935–36	Malmö FF
Regional Championship	Norrländska Mästerskapet 1936	Bodens BK

== Promotions, relegations and qualifications ==
=== Promotions ===
Promoted from	Promoted to	Team	Reason
Division 2 Östra 1935–36	Allsvenskan 1936–37	Djurgårdens IF	Winners of promotion play-off
Division 2 Södra 1935–36	Allsvenskan 1936–37	Malmö FF	Winners of promotion play-off
Division 3 1935–36	Division 2 Norra 1936–37	IF Rune	Winners of Mellansvenska
Division 3 1935–36	Division 2 Norra 1936–37	IFK Grängesberg	Winners of promotion play-off
Division 3 1935–36	Division 2 Östra 1936–37	Reymersholms IK	Winners of Östsvenska
Division 3 1935–36	Division 2 Östra 1936–37	IK Tord	Winners of Södra Mellansvenska
Division 3 1935–36	Division 2 Västra 1936–37	Karlstads BIK	Winners of Nordvästra
Division 3 1935–36	Division 2 Västra 1936–37	Tidaholms GIF	Winners of promotion play-off
Division 3 1935–36	Division 2 Södra 1936–37	BK Landora	Winners of Sydsvenska
Division 3 1935–36	Division 2 Södra 1936–37	Växjö BK	Winners of Sydöstra

=== League transfers ===
Transferred from	Transferred to	Team	Reason
Division 2 Östra 1935–36	Division 2 Norra 1936–37	IFK Västerås	Geographical composition
Division 2 Västra 1935–36	Division 2 Östra 1936–37	Husqvarna IF	Geographical composition
Division 2 Norra 1935–36	Division 2 Västra 1936–37	IFK Örebro	Geographical composition

=== Relegations ===
Relegated from	Relegated to	Team	Reason
Allsvenskan 1935–36	Division 2 Södra 1936–37	Halmstads BK	11th team
Allsvenskan 1935–36	Division 2 Östra 1936–37	IFK Eskilstuna	12th team
Division 2 Norra 1935–36	Division 3 1936–37	IFK Kumla	9th team
Division 2 Norra 1935–36	Division 3 1936–37	Örebro SK	10th team
Division 2 Östra 1935–36	Division 3 1936–37	Sundbybergs IK	9th team
Division 2 Östra 1935–36	Division 3 1936–37	Västerviks AIS	10th team
Division 2 Västra 1935–36	Division 3 1936–37	IFK Värnamo	9th team
Division 2 Västra 1935–36	Division 3 1936–37	Landala IF	10th team
Division 2 Södra 1935–36	Division 3 1936–37	IFK Malmö	9th team
Division 2 Södra 1935–36	Division 3 1936–37	Lessebo GoIF	10th team

== Domestic results ==
=== Allsvenskan 1935–36 ===

	Team	Pld	W	D	L	GF		GA	GD	Pts
1	IF Elfsborg	22	15	4	3	71	–	33	+38	34
2	AIK	22	13	4	5	58	–	39	+19	30
3	Sandvikens IF	22	11	5	6	40	–	32	+8	27
4	IFK Göteborg	22	9	7	6	36	–	28	+8	25
5	Landskrona BoIS	22	10	4	8	46	–	34	+12	24
6	Gårda BK	22	9	6	7	27	–	28	-1	24
7	Örgryte IS	22	9	3	10	38	–	41	-3	21
8	IK Sleipner	22	8	3	11	51	–	48	+3	19
9	IFK Norrköping	22	5	8	9	40	–	51	-11	18
10	GAIS	22	6	6	10	29	–	44	-15	18
11	Halmstads BK	22	5	7	10	31	–	46	-15	17
12	IFK Eskilstuna	22	1	5	16	24	–	67	-43	7

=== Allsvenskan promotion play-off 1935–36 ===
June 7, 1936

Djurgårdens IF	3–0	Hallstahammars SK

?, Stockholm
June 14, 1936

Hallstahammars SK	3–0	Djurgårdens IF

?, Hallstahammar
June 21, 1936

Djurgårdens IF	2–1	Hallstahammars SK

?, Norrköping

June 7, 1936

Billingsfors IK	2–1	Malmö FF

?, Billingsfors
June 14, 1936

Malmö FF	4–1	Billingsfors IK

?, Malmö
June 21, 1936

Billingsfors IK	2–3	Malmö FF

?, Borås

=== Division 2 Norra 1935–36 ===

	Team	Pld	W	D	L	GF		GA	GD	Pts
1	Hallstahammars SK	18	14	2	2	52	–	19	+33	30
2	IK Brage	18	11	1	6	57	–	34	+23	23
3	IFK Örebro	18	10	2	6	39	–	30	+9	22
4	Gefle IF	18	9	2	7	54	–	36	+18	20
5	Fagersta AIK	18	8	4	6	37	–	41	-4	20
6	Surahammars IF	18	7	2	9	33	–	39	-6	16
7	Bollnäs GIF	18	6	3	9	27	–	34	-7	15
8	Ljusne AIK	18	6	3	9	22	–	31	-9	15
9	IFK Kumla	18	6	3	9	35	–	59	-24	15
10	Örebro SK	18	2	0	16	21	–	54	-33	4

=== Division 2 Östra 1935–36 ===
	Team	Pld	W	D	L	GF		GA	GD	Pts
1	Djurgårdens IF	18	11	4	3	35	–	22	+13	26
2	Skärblacka IF	18	10	1	7	53	–	30	+23	21
3	Värtans IK	18	8	5	5	34	–	33	+1	21
4	Hammarby IF	18	9	2	7	28	–	26	+2	20
5	BK Derby	18	7	6	5	26	–	28	-2	20
6	Årsta SK	18	8	2	8	39	–	35	+4	18
7	Mjölby AI	18	7	4	7	28	–	29	-1	18
8	IFK Västerås	18	6	4	8	43	–	38	+5	16
9	Sundbybergs IK	18	5	4	9	25	–	36	-11	14
10	Västerviks AIS	18	1	4	13	11	–	45	-34	6

=== Division 2 Västra 1935–36 ===
	Team	Pld	W	D	L	GF		GA	GD	Pts
1	Billingsfors IK	18	12	4	2	48	–	29	+19	28
2	Karlskoga IF	18	10	6	2	57	–	31	+26	26
3	Jonsereds IF	18	8	6	4	34	–	31	+3	22
4	Husqvarna IF	18	8	3	7	44	–	30	+14	19
5	Degerfors IF	18	6	6	6	36	–	34	+2	18
6	IFK Kristinehamn	18	7	4	7	27	–	41	-14	18
7	Fässbergs IF	18	6	5	7	38	–	40	-2	17
8	Alingsås IF	18	5	3	10	37	–	41	-4	13
9	IFK Värnamo	18	6	1	11	39	–	48	-9	13
10	Landala IF	18	1	4	13	29	–	64	-35	6

=== Division 2 Södra 1935–36 ===
	Team	Pld	W	D	L	GF		GA	GD	Pts
1	Malmö FF	18	14	2	2	61	–	17	+44	30
2	Helsingborgs IF	18	11	3	4	62	–	27	+35	25
3	IFK Helsingborg	18	8	6	4	42	–	34	+8	22
4	Malmö BI	18	8	3	7	29	–	30	-1	19
5	Höganäs BK	18	8	2	8	32	–	30	+2	18
6	Ängelholms IF	18	7	4	7	44	–	48	-4	18
7	IFK Kristianstad	18	7	1	10	30	–	57	-27	15
8	IS Halmia	18	4	6	8	17	–	28	-11	14
9	IFK Malmö	18	5	2	11	34	–	52	-18	12
10	Lessebo GoIF	18	2	3	13	16	–	51	-35	7

=== Division 2 promotion play-off 1935–36 ===
June 14, 1936

IFK Grängesberg	2–0	Söderhamns IF

?, ?
June 21, 1936

Söderhamns IF	0–2	IFK Grängesberg

?, ?

June 7, 1936

Tidaholms GIF	4–1	Lundby IF

?, ?
June 14, 1936

Lundby IF	4–2	Tidaholms GIF

?, ?
June 21, 1936

Tidaholms GIF	1–0	Lundby IF

?, ?

=== Norrländska Mästerskapet 1936 ===
Final

June 21, 1936

Bodens BK	5–0	Kubikenborgs IF

Bandyvallen, Boden

== National team results ==
September 1, 1935
Friendly
№ 193

Sweden	7–1	Romania
Bergsten 17'; Keller 47'; Nilsson 70', 73', 87'; Jonasson 72'; Persson 74' (pen.)		Georgescu 60'

Stockholms Stadion, Stockholm
Attendance: 20,000
Referee: Barlassina (Italy)

Sweden: Sven Bergquist - Nils Axelsson, Walter Sköld - Fritz Berg, Harry Johansson, Ernst Andersson - Curt Bergsten, Erik Persson, Sven Jonasson, Tore Keller, Axel Nilsson.

September 22, 1935
1933–36 Nordic Championship
№ 194

Norway	0–2	Sweden
		Nilsson 42'; Grahn 77'

Ullevaal, Oslo
Attendance: 35,000
Referee: Dreiø (Denmark)

Sweden: Sven Bergquist - Nils Axelsson, Sven Andersson - Fritz Berg, Helge Liljebjörn, Ernst Andersson - Curt Bergsten, Erik Persson, Sven Jonasson, Karl-Erik Grahn, Axel Nilsson.

November 10, 1935
Friendly
№ 195

France	2–0	Sweden
Berg 30' (o.g.); Courtois 70'

Parc des Princes, Paris
Attendance: 26,905
Referee: Barton (England)

Sweden: Sven Bergquist - Nils Axelsson, Walter Sköld - Fritz Berg, Harry Johansson, Einar Karlsson - Curt Bergsten, Erik Persson, Sven Jonasson, Karl-Erik Grahn, Axel Nilsson.

November 17, 1935
Friendly
№ 196

Belgium	5–1	Sweden
Van Caelenberghe 15'; Capelle 18', 74'; Isemborghs 57', 80'		Nilsson 12'

Stade du Jubilé, Brussels
Attendance: 15,000
Referee: Weingärtner (Germany)

Sweden: Sven Bergquist - Nils Axelsson, Walter Sköld - Fritz Berg, Bengt Essman, Einar Karlsson - Curt Bergsten, Erik Persson, Sven Jonasson, Karl-Erik Grahn, Axel Nilsson.

June 14, 1936
1933–36 Nordic Championship
№ 197

Denmark	4–3	Sweden
Søbirk 11'; Andersson 44' (o.g.); Jørgensen 46'; Thielsen 83'		Toft-Jensen 1' (o.g.); Jonasson 15'; Josefsson 76'

Idrætsparken, Copenhagen
Attendance: 32,000
Referee: Kristiansen (Norway)

Sweden: Sven Bergquist - Otto Andersson, Sven Andersson - Victor Carlund, Arvid Emanuelsson, Ernst Andersson - Gustaf Josefsson, Åke Samuelsson, Sven Jonasson, Karl-Erik Grahn, Åke Hallman.

June 21, 1936
Friendly
№ 198

Sweden	5–2	Switzerland
Hallman 10', 82'; Jonasson 27', 56', 59'		Aebi 55'; Bickel 89'

Stockholms Stadion, Stockholm
Attendance: 13,605
Referee: Ulrich (Denmark)

Sweden: Sven Bergquist - Otto Andersson, Erik Källström - Victor Carlund, Arvid Emanuelsson, Ernst Andersson - Gustaf Josefsson, Erik Persson, Sven Jonasson, Karl-Erik Grahn, Åke Hallman.

July 5, 1936
1933–36 Nordic Championship
№ 199

Sweden	2–0	Norway
Jonasson 25', 36'

Ullevi, Gothenburg
Attendance: 21,627
Referee: Baert (Belgium)

Sweden: Sven Bergquist - Otto Andersson, Erik Källström - Victor Carlund, Arvid Emanuelsson, Ernst Andersson - Gustaf Josefsson, Erik Persson, Sven Jonasson, Karl-Erik Grahn, Åke Hallman.

July 26, 1936
Friendly
№ 200

Sweden	3–4	Norway
Persson 17', 66'; Jonasson 88' (pen.)		Kvammen 17' (pen.), 29', 65'; Isaksen 43'

Stockholms Stadion, Stockholm
Attendance: 20,000
Referee: Weingärtner (Germany)

Sweden: Sven Bergquist - Otto Andersson, Erik Källström - Victor Carlund, Torsten Johansson, Einar Snitt - Gustaf Josefsson ( Bertil Ericsson), Erik Persson, Sven Jonasson, Karl-Erik Grahn, Åke Hallman.

== National team players in season 1935–36 ==
name	pos.	caps	goals	club
Ernst Andersson	MF	5	0	IFK Göteborg
Otto Andersson	DF	4	0	Örgryte IS
Sven "Vrålis" Andersson	DF	2	0	AIK
Nils Axelsson	DF	4	0	Hälsingborgs IF
Fritz Berg	MF	4	0	IFK Göteborg
Sven "Svenne Berka" Bergquist (Bergqvist)	GK	8	0	Hammarby IF (4); AIK (4)
Curt (Kurt) Bergsten	FW	4	1	Landskrona BoIS
Victor Carlund	MF	4	0	Örgryte IS
Arvid "Emma" Emanuelsson	MF	3	0	IF Elfsborg
Bertil Ericsson	FW	1	0	Sandvikens IF
Bengt Essman	MF	1	0	IFK Eskilstuna
Karl-Erik Grahn	FW	7	1	IF Elfsborg
Åke Hallman	FW	4	2	IF Elfsborg
Harry "Båten" Johansson	MF	2	0	Gårda BK
Torsten Johansson	MF	1	0	IFK Norrköping
Sven "Jonas" Jonasson	FW	8	8	IF Elfsborg
Gustaf "Niggern" Josefsson	FW	4	1	AIK
Erik "Järnbacken" Källström	DF	3	0	IF Elfsborg
Einar Karlsson	MF	2	0	Gårda BK
Tore Keller	FW	1	1	IK Sleipner
Helge Liljebjörn	MF	1	0	GAIS
Axel "Acke" Nilsson	FW	4	5	AIK
Erik "Lillis" Persson	FW	7	3	AIK
Åke Samuelsson	FW	1	0	IF Elfsborg
Walter Sköld	DF	3	0	AIK
Einar Snitt	MF	1	0	Sandvikens IF
