= 1931–32 in Swedish football =

The 1931–32 season in Swedish football, starting August 1931 and ending July 1932:

== Honours ==
=== Official titles ===
Title	Team	Reason
1931–32 Swedish Champions	AIK	Winners of Allsvenskan

=== Competitions ===
Level	Competition	Team
1st level	Allsvenskan 1931–32	AIK
2nd level	Division 2 Norra 1931–32	Sandvikens IF
2nd level	Division 2 Södra 1931–32	IS Halmia
Regional Championship	Norrländska Mästerskapet 1932	Malmbergets AIF

== Promotions, relegations and qualifications ==
=== Promotions ===
Promoted from	Promoted to	Team	Reason
Division 2 Norra 1931–32	Allsvenskan 1932–33	Sandvikens IF	Winners
Division 2 Södra 1931–32	Allsvenskan 1932–33	IS Halmia	Winners
Division 3 1931–32	Division 2 Norra 1932–33	IFK Grängesberg	Winners of Uppsvenska
Division 3 1931–32	Division 2 Norra 1932–33	Brynäs IF	2nd team in Uppsvenska
Division 3 1931–32	Division 2 Norra 1932–33	Örebro IK	2nd team in Mellansvenska
Division 3 1931–32	Division 2 Östra 1932–33	Djurgårdens IF	Winners of Östsvenska
Division 3 1931–32	Division 2 Östra 1932–33	Reymersholms IF	2nd team in Östsvenska
Division 3 1931–32	Division 2 Östra 1932–33	IK City	Winners of Mellansvenska
Division 3 1931–32	Division 2 Östra 1932–33	Åtvidabergs IF	Winners of Södra Mellansvenska
Division 3 1931–32	Division 2 Östra 1932–33	Motala AIF	2nd team in Södra Mellansvenska
Division 3 1931–32	Division 2 Västra 1932–33	Billingsfors IK	Winners of Nordvästra
Division 3 1931–32	Division 2 Västra 1932–33	Karlskoga IF	2nd team in Nordvästra
Division 3 1931–32	Division 2 Västra 1932–33	Slottsbrons IF	3rd team in Nordvästra
Division 3 1931–32	Division 2 Västra 1932–33	Degerfors IF	4th team in Nordvästra
Division 3 1931–32	Division 2 Västra 1932–33	IFK Uddevalla	Winners of Västsvenska
Division 3 1931–32	Division 2 Västra 1932–33	Krokslätts FF	2nd team in Västsvenska
Division 3 1931–32	Division 2 Västra 1932–33	Jonsereds IF	3rd team in Västsvenska
Division 3 1931–32	Division 2 Västra 1932–33	Surte IS	4th team in Västsvenska
Division 3 1931–32	Division 2 Västra 1932–33	Majornas IK	5th team in Västsvenska
Division 3 1931–32	Division 2 Södra 1932–33	Kalmar FF	Winners of Sydöstra
Division 3 1931–32	Division 2 Södra 1932–33	Kalmar AIK	2nd team in Sydöstra
Division 3 1931–32	Division 2 Södra 1932–33	IFK Karlshamn	3rd team in Sydöstra
Division 3 1931–32	Division 2 Södra 1932–33	Malmö BI	Winners of Sydsvenska
Division 3 1931–32	Division 2 Södra 1932–33	Lunds BK	2nd team in Sydöstra

=== League transfers ===
Transferred from	Transferred to	Team	Reason
Division 2 Norra 1931–32	Division 2 Östra 1932–33	Hammarby IF	Geographical composition
Division 2 Norra 1931–32	Division 2 Östra 1932–33	IFK Norrköping	Geographical composition
Division 2 Norra 1931–32	Division 2 Östra 1932–33	Westermalms IF	Geographical composition
Division 2 Södra 1931–32	Division 2 Östra 1932–33	BK Derby	Geographical composition
Division 2 Södra 1931–32	Division 2 Östra 1932–33	Mjölby AI	Geographical composition
Division 2 Södra 1931–32	Division 2 Västra 1932–33	Fässbergs IF	Geographical composition

=== Relegations ===
Relegated from	Relegated to	Team	Reason
Allsvenskan 1931–32	Division 2 Södra 1932–33	IFK Malmö	11th team
Allsvenskan 1931–32	Division 2 Norra 1932–33	Hallstahammars SK	12th team
Division 2 Norra 1931–32	Division 3 1932–33	Skärgårdens IF	11th team
Division 2 Södra 1931–32	Division 3 1932–33	IFK Kristianstad	9th team

== Domestic results ==
=== Allsvenskan 1931–32 ===

	Team	Pld	W	D	L	GF		GA	GD	Pts
1	AIK	22	12	9	1	58	–	33	+25	33
2	Örgryte IS	22	13	5	4	67	–	37	+30	31
3	GAIS	22	11	8	3	45	–	29	+16	30
4	IFK Göteborg	22	11	4	7	47	–	34	+13	26
5	IFK Eskilstuna	22	9	5	8	50	–	44	+6	23
6	IK Sleipner	22	8	6	8	41	–	35	+6	22
7	IF Elfsborg	22	8	6	8	38	–	35	+3	22
8	Helsingborgs IF	22	9	3	10	45	–	44	+1	21
9	Malmö FF	22	6	4	12	48	–	68	-20	16
10	Landskrona BoIS	22	4	8	10	35	–	58	-23	16
11	IFK Malmö	22	4	6	12	32	–	55	-23	14
12	Hallstahammars SK	22	2	6	14	29	–	63	-34	10

=== Division 2 Norra 1931–32 ===

	Team	Pld	W	D	L	GF		GA	GD	Pts
1	Sandvikens IF	20	16	2	2	64	–	28	+36	34
2	IFK Norrköping	20	12	2	6	84	–	28	+56	26
3	IK Brage	20	11	2	7	43	–	25	+18	24
4	IFK Västerås	20	9	4	7	35	–	36	-1	22
5	Sandvikens AIK	20	8	4	8	32	–	43	-11	20
6	Surahammars IF	20	7	5	8	38	–	42	-4	19
7	Hammarby IF	20	7	4	9	33	–	44	-11	18
8	Gefle IF	20	6	5	9	52	–	50	+2	17
9	Westermalms IF	20	5	6	9	34	–	44	-10	16
10	IFK Kumla	20	6	4	10	27	–	52	-25	16
11	Skärgårdens IF	20	3	2	15	34	–	84	-50	8

=== Division 2 Södra 1931–32 ===
	Team	Pld	W	D	L	GF		GA	GD	Pts
1	IS Halmia	16	10	4	2	37	–	17	+20	24
2	BK Derby	16	9	3	4	40	–	30	+10	21
3	Halmstads BK	16	8	3	5	37	–	28	+9	19
4	Höganäs BK	16	7	3	6	46	–	36	+10	17
5	Stattena IF	16	7	2	7	27	–	29	-2	16
6	Fässbergs IF	16	5	4	7	27	–	30	-3	14
7	Mjölby AI	16	4	5	7	29	–	41	-12	13
8	BK Drott	16	3	5	8	39	–	41	-2	11
9	IFK Kristianstad	16	3	3	10	18	–	48	-30	9

=== Norrländska Mästerskapet 1932 ===
Final

July 24, 1932

Malmbergets AIF	3–2	Ljusne AIK

Malmbergets IP, Malmberget

== National team results ==
September 27, 1931
1929–32 Nordic Championship
№ 160

Norway	2–1	Sweden
Andersen 9'; Juve 38'		Hansson 71'

Ullevaal, Oslo
Attendance: 28,208
Referee: Weingärtner (Germany)

Sweden: Anders Rydberg - Herbert Samuelsson, Arne Johansson - Rune Carlsson, Nils Rosén, Ernst Andersson - John "Jompa" Nilsson, Erik Persson, Sune Zetterberg, Sven Rydell, Evert Hansson.

November 8, 1931
Friendly
№ 161

Hungary	3–1	Sweden
Spitz 3'; Avar 35', 56'		Rydell 9'

Stadion Üllői Út, Budapest
Attendance: 18,000
Referee: Barlassina (Italy)

Sweden: Anders Rydberg - Axel Alfredsson, Arne Johansson - Helge Liljebjörn, Nils Rosén, Ernst Andersson - John "Jompa" Nilsson, Gunnar Rydberg, Harry Lundahl, Sven Rydell, Evert Hansson.

May 16, 1932
Friendly
№ 162

Sweden	7–1	Finland
Rydell 12', 20', 62'; Närhinen 30' (o.g.); Persson 34'; Nilsson 57'; Holmberg 85' (pen.)		Kanerva 10'

Stockholms Stadion, Stockholm
Attendance: 20,500
Referee: Andersen (Norway)

Sweden: Eivar Widlund - Axel Alfredsson, Sven Andersson - Hugo Sjögren, Wilhelm Petersén, Erik Granath - John "Jompa" Nilsson, Erik Persson, Carl-Erik Holmberg, Sven Rydell, Evert Hansson.

June 10, 1932
1929–32 Nordic Championship
№ 163

Finland	1–3	Sweden
Grönlund 3'		Nilsson 2'; Gardtman 51'; Holmberg 64' (pen.)

Tölö bollplan, Helsinki
Attendance: 7,000
Referee: Kristiansen (Norway)

Sweden: Sture Hult - Otto Andersson, Arne Johansson - Helge Liljebjörn, Nils Rosén, Erik Granath - John "Jompa" Nilsson, Rolf Gardtman, Carl-Erik Holmberg, Sven Rydell, Knut Kroon.

June 12, 1932
Friendly
№ 164

Sweden	3–1	Belgium
Sundberg 15', 78'; Hansson 50'		Vanden Eynde 22'

Stockholms Stadion, Stockholm
Attendance: 19,000
Referee: Weingärtner (Germany)

Sweden: Eivar Widlund - Herbert Samuelsson, Sven Andersson - Hugo Sjögren, Victor Carlund, Carl Johnsson - Gösta Dunker, Ragnar Gustavsson, John Sundberg, Sven Jonasson, Evert Hansson.

June 19, 1932
1929–32 Nordic Championship
№ 165

Denmark	3–1	Sweden
Hansen 3'; Petersen 22'; Jørgensen 79'		Kroon 13'

Idrætsparken, Copenhagen
Attendance: 28,000
Referee: Fuchs (Germany)

Sweden: Sture Hult - Herbert Samuelsson, Arne Johansson - Helge Liljebjörn, Nils Rosén, Carl Johnsson - Gösta Dunker, Ragnar Gustavsson, Harry Lundahl, Sven Rydell, Knut Kroon.

July 1, 1932
1929–32 Nordic Championship
№ 166

Sweden	1–4	Norway
Holmberg 39' (pen.)		Juve 8', 53'; Moe 69', 76'

Ullevi, Gothenburg
Attendance: 22,108
Referee: van Praag (Belgium)

Sweden: Sture Hult ( Olle Bengtsson) - Herbert Samuelsson, Arne Johansson - Helge Liljebjörn, Nils Rosén, Ernst Andersson - Gösta Dunker, Rolf Gardtman, Carl-Erik Holmberg, Sven Rydell, Evert Hansson.

July 10, 1932
Friendly
№ 167

Poland	2–0	Sweden
Nawrot 12'; Bator 86'

Stadion Marszałka Józefa Piłsudskiego, Warsaw
Attendance: 14,000
Referee: Bauwens (Germany)

Sweden: Gösta Krusberg (12' Anders Rydberg) - Otto Andersson, Erik Lager - Erik Källström, Harry Johansson, Gösta Nordström - Gösta Dunker, Gunnar Olsson, John Sundberg, Ragnar Jacobsson, Evert Hansson.

July 13, 1932
Friendly
№ 168

Latvia	0–0	Sweden

LSB Stadions, Riga
Attendance: 5,000
Referee: Paal (Estonia)

Sweden: Anders Rydberg - Otto Andersson, Erik Lager - Erik Källström, Harry Johansson, Gösta Nordström - Gösta Dunker, Evert Blomgren, John Sundberg, Helge Andersson, Evert Hansson.

July 15, 1932
Friendly
№ 169

Estonia	1–3	Sweden
Kass 75'		Johansson 25', 74'; Dunker 58'

Kadriorg Stadium, Tallinn
Attendance: 6,000
Referee: Vickström (Finland)

Sweden: Anders Rydberg - Otto Andersson, Erik Lager - Erik Källström, Harry Johansson, Gösta Nordström - Gösta Dunker, Gunnar Rydberg, Torsten Johansson, John Sundberg, Evert Hansson.

July 17, 1932
Friendly
№ 170

Sweden	3–4	Austria
Svensson 31' "Lång-John" Nilsson 54', 88'		Vogl 26'; Sindelar 35'; Waitz 48'; Molzer 80'

Stockholms Stadion, Stockholm
Attendance: 15,000
Referee: Hansen (Denmark)

Sweden: Eivar Widlund (46' Sture Hult) - Herbert Samuelsson, Sven Andersson - Hugo Sjögren, Victor Carlund, Ernst Andersson - John "Jompa" Nilsson, Ragnar Gustavsson, John "Lång-John" Nilsson, Holger Johansson-Jernsten, Gösta Svensson.

== National team players in season 1931–32 ==
Name	Pos.	Caps	Goals	Club
Axel "Massa" Alfredsson	DF	2	0	AIK
Ernst Andersson	MF	4	0	IFK Göteborg
Helge "Hegge" Andersson	FW	1	0	Surahammars IF
Otto Andersson	DF	4	0	Örgryte IS
Sven "Vrålis" Andersson	DF	3	0	AIK
Olle Bengtsson	GK	1	0	GAIS
Evert "Blommar" Blomgren	FW	1	0	IK Sleipner
Rune Carlsson	MF	1	0	IFK Eskilstuna
Victor Carlund	MF	2	0	Örgryte IS
Gösta Dunker	FW	6	1	Sandvikens IF
Rolf Gardtman	FW	2	1	Örgryte IS
Erik Granath	MF	2	0	Örgryte IS
Ragnar Gustavsson	FW	3	0	GAIS
Evert "Sperling" Hansson	FW	8	2	Örgryte IS
Carl-Erik "Slana" Holmberg	FW	3	3	Örgryte IS
Sture Hult	GK	4	0	IFK Eskilstuna
Ragnar "Bob" Jacobsson	FW	1	0	Sandvikens IF
Arne "Tysken" Johansson	DF	5	0	Hälsingborgs IF
Harry "Båten" Johansson	MF	3	0	GAIS
Torsten Johansson	FW	1	2	IFK Norrköping
Holger Johansson-Jernsten	FW	1	0	GAIS
Carl (Karl) Johnsson	MF	2	0	GAIS
Sven "Jonas" Jonasson	FW	1	0	IF Elfsborg
Erik "Järnbacken" Källström	MF	3	0	IF Elfsborg
Knut "Knutte" Kroon	FW	2	1	Hälsingborgs IF
Gösta "Hummern" Krusberg	GK	1	0	IS Halmia
Erik Lager	DF	3	0	IF Elfsborg
Helge Liljebjörn	MF	4	0	GAIS
Harry Lundahl	FW	2	0	IFK Eskilstuna
John "Jompa" Nilsson	FW	5	2	AIK
John "Lång-John" Nilsson	FW	1	2	GAIS
Gösta Nordström	MF	3	0	IF Elfsborg
Gunnar "Lill-Gunnar" Olsson	FW	1	0	Hälsingborgs IF
Erik "Lillis" Persson	FW	2	1	AIK
Wilhelm "Mulle" Petersén	MF	1	0	AIK
Nils "Rossi" Rosén	MF	5	0	Hälsingborgs IF
Anders Rydberg	GK	5	0	IFK Göteborg
Gunnar "Lillen" Rydberg	FW	2	0	IFK Göteborg
Sven "Trollgubben" Rydell	FW	6	4	Örgryte IS
Herbert Samuelsson	DF	5	0	IFK Göteborg
Hugo "Hugge" Sjögren	MF	3	0	AIK
John Sundberg	FW	4	2	Åtvidabergs IF
Gösta "Saxofonen" Svensson	FW	1	1	GAIS
Eivar Widlund	GK	3	0	AIK
Sune "Skinnet" Zetterberg	FW	1	0	IK Brage
