= 1933–34 in Swedish football =

The 1933–34 season in Swedish football, starting August 1933 and ending July 1934:

== Honours ==
=== Official titles ===
Title	Team	Reason
1933–34 Swedish Champions	Helsingborgs IF	Winners of Allsvenskan

=== Competitions ===
Level	Competition	Team
1st level	Allsvenskan 1933–34	Helsingborgs IF
2nd level	Division 2 Norra 1933–34	IK Brage
2nd level	Division 2 Östra 1933–34	IK Sleipner
2nd level	Division 2 Västra 1933–34	Fässbergs IF
2nd level	Division 2 Södra 1933–34	Landskrona BoIS

== Promotions, relegations and qualifications ==
=== Promotions ===
Promoted from	Promoted to	Team	Reason
Division 2 Östra 1933–34	Allsvenskan 1934–35	IK Sleipner	Winners of promotion play-off
Division 2 Södra 1933–34	Allsvenskan 1934–35	Landskrona BoIS	Winners of promotion play-off
Division 3 1934–35	Division 2 Norra 1934–35	Bollnäs GIF	Winners of Uppsvenska
Division 3 1934–35	Division 2 Norra 1934–35	IF Rune	Winners of Mellansvenska
Division 3 1933–34	Division 2 Östra 1934–35	Västerviks AIS	Winners of Södra Mellansvenska
Division 3 1933–34	Division 2 Östra 1934–35	Årsta SK	Winners of Östsvenska
Division 3 1933–34	Division 2 Västra 1934–35	Degerfors IF	Winners of Nordvästra
Division 3 1933–34	Division 2 Västra 1934–35	Landala IF	Winners of Västsvenska
Division 3 1933–34	Division 2 Södra 1934–35	IFK Värnamo	Winners of Sydöstra
Division 3 1933–34	Division 2 Södra 1934–35	Ängelholms IF	Winners of Sydsvenska

=== League transfers ===
Transferred from	Transferred to	Team	Reason
Division 2 Södra 1933–34	Division 2 Östra 1934–35	Kalmar FF	Geographical composition

=== Relegations ===
Relegated from	Relegated to	Team	Reason
Allsvenskan 1933–34	Division 2 Södra 1934–35	IS Halmia	11th team
Allsvenskan 1933–34	Division 2 Södra 1934–35	Malmö FF	Excluded
Division 2 Norra 1933–34	Division 3 1934–35	IFK Örebro	9th team
Division 2 Norra 1933–34	Division 3 1934–35	Brynäs IF	10th team
Division 2 Östra 1933–34	Division 3 1934–35	Motala AIF	9th team
Division 2 Östra 1933–34	Division 3 1934–35	Reymersholms IK	10th team
Division 2 Västra 1933–34	Division 3 1934–35	Surte IS	9th team
Division 2 Västra 1933–34	Division 3 1934–35	Krokslätts FF	10th team
Division 2 Södra 1933–34	Division 3 1934–35	BK Drott	9th team
Division 2 Södra 1933–34	Division 3 1934–35	Lessebo GoIF	10th team

== Domestic results ==
=== Allsvenskan 1933–34 ===

	Team	Pld	W	D	L	GF		GA	GD	Pts
1	Helsingborgs IF	20	13	1	6	49	–	35	+14	27
2	GAIS	20	12	2	6	54	–	34	+20	26
3	IFK Göteborg	20	11	3	6	52	–	38	+14	25
4	Halmstads BK	20	9	4	7	43	–	38	+5	22
5	Örgryte IS	20	9	3	8	38	–	35	+3	21
6	IF Elfsborg	20	7	6	7	45	–	44	+1	20
7	AIK	20	6	6	8	40	–	42	-2	18
8	Sandvikens IF	20	7	3	10	49	–	57	-8	17
9	IFK Eskilstuna	20	7	3	10	42	–	52	-10	17
10	Gefle IF	20	6	4	10	37	–	56	-19	16
11	IS Halmia	20	3	5	12	23	–	41	-18	11
–	Malmö FF	13	5	0	8	27	–	38	-11	10

=== Allsvenskan promotion play-off 1933–34 ===
June 10, 1934

IK Sleipner	3–2	IK Brage

?, Norrköping
June 17, 1934

IK Brage	3–3	IK Sleipner

?, Borlänge

June 10, 1934

Landskrona BoIS	3–1	Fässbergs IF

?, Landskrona
June 17, 1934

Fässbergs IF	0–2	Landskrona BoIS

?, Mölndal

=== Division 2 Norra 1933–34 ===

	Team	Pld	W	D	L	GF		GA	GD	Pts
1	IK Brage	18	14	2	2	77	–	28	+49	30
2	Örebro SK	18	9	5	4	41	–	23	+18	23
3	Surahammars IF	18	10	3	5	34	–	22	+12	23
4	IFK Kumla	18	8	3	7	35	–	37	-2	19
5	IFK Grängesberg	18	8	2	8	44	–	36	+8	18
6	Ljusne AIK	18	8	2	8	31	–	37	-6	18
7	Hallstahammars SK	18	7	3	8	21	–	29	-8	17
8	IFK Västerås	18	7	1	10	23	–	32	-9	15
9	IFK Örebro	18	6	2	10	34	–	44	-10	14
10	Brynäs IF	18	1	1	16	15	–	67	-52	3

=== Division 2 Östra 1933–34 ===
	Team	Pld	W	D	L	GF		GA	GD	Pts
1	IK Sleipner	18	16	0	2	74	–	24	+50	32
2	Djurgårdens IF	18	12	3	3	42	–	23	+19	27
3	Hammarby IF	18	11	1	6	49	–	32	+17	23
4	IFK Norrköping	18	8	2	8	55	–	40	+15	18
5	Sundbybergs IK	18	6	6	6	25	–	30	-5	18
6	Mjölby AI	18	7	4	7	34	–	48	-14	18
7	BK Derby	18	6	2	10	26	–	48	-22	14
8	Åtvidabergs IF	18	4	3	11	32	–	49	-17	11
9	Motala AIF	18	4	2	12	29	–	57	-28	10
10	Reymersholms IK	18	3	3	12	33	–	48	-15	9

=== Division 2 Västra 1933–34 ===
	Team	Pld	W	D	L	GF		GA	GD	Pts
1	Fässbergs IF	18	10	4	4	40	–	22	+18	24
2	IFK Uddevalla	18	10	4	4	44	–	27	+17	24
3	Gårda BK	18	10	4	4	47	–	31	+16	24
4	Karlskoga IF	18	7	4	7	37	–	35	+2	18
5	Jonsereds IF	18	8	2	8	42	–	42	0	18
6	Billingsfors IK	18	6	4	8	35	–	38	-3	16
7	Slottsbrons IF	18	6	4	8	31	–	37	-6	16
8	Husqvarna IF	18	6	2	10	28	–	35	-7	14
9	Surte IS	18	6	2	10	35	–	45	-10	14
10	Krokslätts FF	18	6	0	12	31	–	58	-27	12

=== Division 2 Södra 1933–34 ===
	Team	Pld	W	D	L	GF		GA	GD	Pts
1	Landskrona BoIS	18	15	0	3	65	–	30	+35	30
1	IFK Helsingborg	18	13	1	4	47	–	22	+25	27
1	IFK Malmö	18	12	1	5	59	–	38	+21	25
1	Lunds BK	18	10	0	8	46	–	56	-10	20
1	Malmö BI	18	8	3	7	46	–	31	+15	19
1	Stattena IF	18	8	0	10	37	–	43	-6	16
1	Kalmar FF	18	6	3	9	31	–	31	0	15
1	Höganäs BK	18	6	2	10	40	–	46	-6	14
1	BK Drott	18	3	2	13	26	–	60	-34	8
1	Lessebo GoIF	18	2	2	14	26	–	66	-40	6

== National team results ==
September 24, 1933
1933–36 Nordic Championship
№ 180

Norway	0–1	Sweden
		Dunker 55'

Ullevaal, Oslo
Attendance: 35,000
Referee: Yssing (Denmark)

Sweden: Anders Rydberg - Nils Axelsson, Sven Andersson - Rune Carlsson, Nils Rosén, Einar Snitt - Gösta Dunker, Olle Källgren, Harry Lundahl, Lennart Bunke, Knut Kroon.

May 23, 1934
Friendly
№ 181

Sweden	4–2	Poland
Jonasson 13'; Keller 36', 70', 74'		Nawrot 26'; Wilimowski 59'

Stockholms Stadion, Stockholm
Attendance: 20,000
Referee: Tuhkunen (Finland)

Sweden: Anders Rydberg - Nils Axelsson, Sven Andersson - Rune Carlsson, Nils Rosén, Ernst Andersson - Gunnar Olsson, Ragnar Gustavsson, Sven Jonasson, Tore Keller, Gunnar Jansson.

May 27, 1934
1934 World Cup 1st round
№ 182

Sweden	3–2	Argentina
Jonasson 9', 67'; Kroon 80'		Belis 4'; Galateo 49'

Stadio Littorale, Bologna
Attendance: 15,000
Referee: Braun (Austria)

Sweden: Anders Rydberg - Nils Axelsson, Sven Andersson - Rune Carlsson, Nils Rosén, Ernst Andersson - Gösta Dunker, Ragnar Gustavsson, Sven Jonasson, Tore Keller, Knut Kroon.

May 31, 1934
1934 World Cup quarter-finals
№ 183

Germany	2–1	Sweden
Hohmann 60', 63'		Dunker 82'

San Siro, Milan
Attendance: 20,000
Referee: Barlassina (Italy)

Sweden: Anders Rydberg - Nils Axelsson, Sven Andersson - Rune Carlsson, Nils Rosén, Ernst Andersson - Gösta Dunker, Ragnar Gustavsson, Sven Jonasson, Tore Keller, Knut Kroon.

June 17, 1934
1933–36 Nordic Championship
№ 184

Denmark	3–5	Sweden
Uldaler 4'; Jørgensen 40', 48'		Ericsson 6', 35', 60', 62'; Persson 23'

Idrætsparken, Copenhagen
Attendance: 30,000
Referee: Kristiansen (Norway)

Sweden: Anders Rydberg - Nils Axelsson, Sven Andersson - Walfrid Persson, Nils Rosén, Ernst Andersson - Emil Karlsson, Erik Persson, Bertil Ericsson, Sven Jonasson, Knut Kroon.

July 1, 1934
1933–36 Nordic Championship
№ 185

Sweden	3–3	Norway
Karlsson 5'; Andersson 13' (p); Ericsson 55'		Pettersen 17' (p); Svendsen 29'; Pedersen 38'

Stockholms Stadion, Stockholm
Attendance: 20,000
Referee: Hansen (Denmark)

Sweden: Anders Rydberg - Nils Axelsson, Sven Andersson - Walfrid Persson, Nils Rosén, Ernst Andersson - Emil Karlsson, Erik Persson, Bertil Ericsson, Sven Jonasson, Knut Kroon.

== National team players in season 1933–34 ==
name	pos.	caps	goals	club
Ernst Andersson	MF	5	0	IFK Göteborg
Sven "Vrålis" Andersson	DF	6	1	AIK
Nils Axelsson	DF	6	0	Hälsingborgs IF
Lennart "Ledde" Bunke	FW	1	0	Hälsingborgs IF
Rune Carlsson	MF	4	0	IFK Eskilstuna
Gösta Dunker	FW	3	2	Sandvikens IF
Bertil Ericsson	FW	2	5	Sandvikens IF
Ragnar Gustavsson	FW	3	0	GAIS
Gunnar Jansson	FW	1	0	Gefle IF
Sven "Jonas" Jonasson	FW	5	3	IF Elfsborg
Olle "Plåten" Källgren	DF/FW	1	0	Sandvikens IF
Emil Karlsson	FW	2	1	Halmstads BK
Tore Keller	FW	3	3	IK Sleipner
Knut "Knutte" Kroon	FW	5	1	Hälsingborgs IF
Harry Lundahl	FW	1	0	IFK Eskilstuna
Gunnar Olsson	FW	1	0	GAIS
Erik "Lillis" Persson	FW	2	1	AIK
Walfrid "Valle" Persson	MF	2	0	Karlskoga IF
Nils "Rossi" Rosén	MF	6	0	Hälsingborgs IF
Anders Rydberg	GK	6	0	IFK Göteborg
Einar Snitt	MF	1	0	Sandvikens IF
