= 1933–34 Division 2 (Swedish football) =

Swedish League Division 2
- Season: 1933–34
- Champions: IK Brage; IK Sleipner; Fässbergs IF; Landskrona BoIS
- Promoted: IK Sleipner; Landskrona BoIS
- Relegated: IFK Örebro; Brynäs IF; Motala AIF; Reymersholms IK; Surte IS; Krokslätts FF; BK Drott; Lessebo GIF

Statistics of Swedish football Division 2 for the 1933–34 season.

== League standings ==
=== Division 2 Norra 1933–34 ===
Teams from a large part of northern Sweden, approximately above the province of Medelpad, were not allowed to play in the national league system until the 1953–54 season, and a championship was instead played to decide the best team in Norrland.

Pos	Team	Pld	W	D	L	GF	GA	GD	Pts	Qualification or relegation
1	IK Brage	18	14	2	2	77	28	+49	30	Playoffs for promotion to Allsvenskan
2	Örebro SK	18	9	5	4	41	23	+18	23 (Note: Tie breaker is goal average.)	
3	Surahammars IF	18	10	3	5	34	22	+12	23	
4	IFK Kumla	18	8	3	7	35	37	−2	19	
5	IFK Grängesberg	18	8	2	8	44	36	+8	18	
6	Ljusne AIK	18	8	2	8	31	37	−6	18	
7	Hallstahammars SK	18	7	3	8	21	29	−8	17	
8	IFK Västerås	18	7	1	10	23	32	−9	15	
9	IFK Örebro	18	6	2	10	34	44	−10	14	Relegated to Division 3
10	Brynäs IF	18	1	1	16	15	67	−52	3	Relegated to Division 3

=== Division 2 Östra 1933–34 ===
Pos	Team	Pld	W	D	L	GF	GA	GD	Pts	Qualification or relegation
1	IK Sleipner	18	16	0	2	74	24	+50	32	Playoffs for promotion to Allsvenskan
2	Djurgårdens IF	18	12	3	3	42	23	+19	27	
3	Hammarby IF	18	11	1	6	49	32	+17	23	
4	IFK Norrköping	18	8	2	8	55	40	+15	18 (Note: Tie breaker is goal average.)	
5	Sundbybergs IK	18	6	6	6	25	30	−5	18	
6	Mjölby AI	18	7	4	7	34	48	−14	18	
7	BK Derby	18	6	2	10	26	48	−22	14	
8	Åtvidabergs IF	18	4	3	11	32	49	−17	11	
9	Motala AIF	18	4	2	12	29	57	−28	10	Relegated to Division 3
10	Reymersholms IK	18	3	3	12	33	48	−15	9	Relegated to Division 3

=== Division 2 Västra 1933–34 ===
Pos	Team	Pld	W	D	L	GF	GA	GD	Pts	Qualification or relegation
1	Fässbergs IF	18	10	4	4	40	22	+18	24	Playoffs for promotion to Allsvenskan
2	IFK Uddevalla	18	10	4	4	44	27	+17	24	
3	Gårda BK	18	10	4	4	47	31	+16	24	
4	Karlskoga IF	18	7	4	7	37	35	+2	18	
5	Jonsereds IF	18	8	2	8	42	42	0	18	
6	Billingsfors IK	18	6	4	8	35	38	−3	16	
7	Slottsbrons IF	18	6	4	8	31	37	−6	16	
8	Husqvarna IF	18	6	2	10	28	35	−7	14	
9	Surte IS	18	6	2	10	35	45	−10	14	Relegated to Division 3
10	Krokslätts FF	18	6	0	12	31	58	−27	12	Relegated to Division 3

=== Division 2 Södra 1933–34 ===
Pos	Team	Pld	W	D	L	GF	GA	GD	Pts	Qualification or relegation
1	Landskrona BoIS	18	15	0	3	65	30	+35	30	Playoffs for promotion to Allsvenskan
2	IFK Helsingborg	18	13	1	4	47	22	+25	27	
3	IFK Malmö	18	12	1	5	59	38	+21	25	
4	Lunds BK	18	10	0	8	46	56	−10	20	
5	Malmö BI	18	8	3	7	46	31	+15	19	
6	Stattena IF	18	8	0	10	37	43	−6	16	
7	Kalmar FF	18	6	3	9	31	31	0	15	League transfer within league level
8	Höganäs BK	18	6	2	10	40	46	−6	14	
9	BK Drott	18	3	2	13	26	60	−34	8	Relegated to Division 3
10	Lessebo GoIF	18	2	2	14	26	66	−40	6	Relegated to Division 3
