= 1934–35 Division 2 (Swedish football) =

Swedish League Division 2
- Season: 1934–35
- Champions: IK Brage; IFK Norrköping; Gårda BK; Malmö FF
- Promoted: IFK Norrköping; Gårda BK
- Relegated: IF Rune; IFK Grängesberg; Åtvidabergs FF; Kalmar FF; IFK Uddevalla; Slottsbrons IF; Stattena IF; Lunds BK

Statistics of Swedish football Division 2 for the 1934–35 season.

== League standings ==
=== Division 2 Norra 1934–35 ===
Teams from a large part of northern Sweden, approximately above the province of Medelpad, were not allowed to play in the national league system until the 1953–54 season, and a championship was instead played to decide the best team in Norrland.

| Pos | Team | Pld | W | D | L | GF | GA | GD | Pts | Qualification or relegation |
|---|---|---|---|---|---|---|---|---|---|---|
| 1 | IK Brage | 18 | 16 | 0 | 2 | 69 | 27 | +42 | 32 | Playoffs for promotion to Allsvenskan |
| 2 | IFK Västerås | 18 | 9 | 4 | 5 | 46 | 38 | +8 | 22 | League transfer within league level |
| 3 | Örebro SK | 18 | 9 | 3 | 6 | 39 | 29 | +10 | 21 | |
| 4 | Hallstahammars SK | 18 | 7 | 6 | 5 | 32 | 30 | +2 | 20 | |
| 5 | Ljusne AIK | 18 | 8 | 1 | 9 | 37 | 32 | +5 | 17 (Note: Tie breaker is goal average.) | |
| 6 | Surahammars IF | 18 | 6 | 5 | 7 | 31 | 33 | −2 | 17 | |
| 7 | IFK Kumla | 18 | 6 | 2 | 10 | 35 | 50 | −15 | 14 | |
| 8 | Bollnäs GIF | 18 | 5 | 4 | 9 | 23 | 47 | −24 | 14 | |
| 9 | IF Rune | 18 | 6 | 1 | 11 | 30 | 44 | −14 | 13 | Relegated to Division 3 |
| 10 | IFK Grängesberg | 18 | 3 | 4 | 11 | 26 | 38 | −12 | 10 | Relegated to Division 3 |

=== Division 2 Östra 1934–35 ===
| Pos | Team | Pld | W | D | L | GF | GA | GD | Pts | Qualification or relegation |
|---|---|---|---|---|---|---|---|---|---|---|
| 1 | IFK Norrköping | 18 | 12 | 2 | 4 | 68 | 29 | +39 | 26 | Playoffs for promotion to Allsvenskan |
| 2 | Mjölby AI | 18 | 9 | 4 | 5 | 34 | 27 | +7 | 22 | |
| 3 | Hammarby IF | 18 | 7 | 7 | 4 | 32 | 25 | +7 | 21 | |
| 4 | Djurgårdens IF | 18 | 7 | 4 | 7 | 30 | 20 | +10 | 18 | |
| 5 | BK Derby | 18 | 7 | 3 | 8 | 27 | 35 | −8 | 17 (Note: Tie breaker is goal average.) | |
| 6 | Västerviks AIS | 18 | 8 | 1 | 9 | 27 | 44 | −17 | 17 | |
| 7 | Sundbybergs IK | 18 | 6 | 4 | 8 | 36 | 39 | −3 | 16 | |
| 8 | Årsta SK | 18 | 6 | 4 | 8 | 38 | 45 | −7 | 16 | |
| 9 | Åtvidabergs IF | 18 | 6 | 2 | 10 | 31 | 45 | −14 | 14 | Relegated to Division 3 |
| 10 | Kalmar FF | 18 | 5 | 3 | 10 | 32 | 46 | −14 | 13 | Relegated to Division 3 |

=== Division 2 Västra 1934–35 ===
| Pos | Team | Pld | W | D | L | GF | GA | GD | Pts | Qualification or relegation |
|---|---|---|---|---|---|---|---|---|---|---|
| 1 | Gårda BK | 18 | 14 | 2 | 2 | 39 | 15 | +24 | 30 | Playoffs for promotion to Allsvenskan |
| 2 | Karlskoga IF | 18 | 11 | 4 | 3 | 53 | 21 | +32 | 26 | |
| 3 | Billingsfors IK | 18 | 9 | 4 | 5 | 33 | 21 | +12 | 22 | |
| 4 | Jonsereds IF | 18 | 9 | 3 | 6 | 38 | 36 | +2 | 21 | |
| 5 | Fässbergs IF | 18 | 9 | 1 | 8 | 27 | 23 | +4 | 19 | |
| 6 | Husqvarna IF | 18 | 6 | 4 | 8 | 30 | 40 | −10 | 16 (Note: Tie breaker is goal average.) | |
| 7 | Landala IF | 18 | 6 | 4 | 8 | 24 | 40 | −16 | 16 | |
| 8 | Degerfors IF | 18 | 7 | 1 | 10 | 30 | 57 | −27 | 15 | |
| 9 | IFK Uddevalla | 18 | 4 | 2 | 12 | 28 | 42 | −14 | 10 | Relegated to Division 3 |
| 10 | Slottsbrons IF | 18 | 2 | 1 | 15 | 19 | 46 | −27 | 5 | Relegated to Division 3 |

=== Division 2 Södra 1934–35 ===
| Pos | Team | Pld | W | D | L | GF | GA | GD | Pts | Qualification or relegation |
|---|---|---|---|---|---|---|---|---|---|---|
| 1 | Malmö FF | 18 | 13 | 5 | 0 | 66 | 21 | +45 | 31 | Playoffs for promotion to Allsvenskan |
| 2 | IS Halmia | 18 | 11 | 5 | 2 | 44 | 16 | +28 | 27 | |
| 3 | IFK Malmö | 18 | 10 | 2 | 6 | 43 | 39 | +4 | 22 | |
| 4 | IFK Helsingborg | 18 | 9 | 1 | 8 | 49 | 36 | +13 | 19 (Note: Tie breaker is goal average.) | |
| 5 | Ängelholms IF | 18 | 6 | 7 | 5 | 33 | 32 | +1 | 19 | |
| 6 | Höganäs BK | 18 | 6 | 5 | 7 | 41 | 32 | +9 | 17 | |
| 7 | Malmö BI | 18 | 6 | 5 | 7 | 29 | 31 | −2 | 17 | |
| 8 | IFK Värnamo | 28 | 6 | 3 | 19 | 29 | 40 | −11 | 15 | League transfer within league level |
| 9 | Stattena IF | 18 | 5 | 3 | 10 | 19 | 44 | −25 | 13 | Relegated to Division 3 |
| 10 | Lunds BK | 18 | 0 | 0 | 18 | 18 | 80 | −62 | 0 | Relegated to Division 3 |
