= Widlund =

Widlund is a Swedish surname. Notable people with the surname include:

- Eivar Widlund (1905–1968), Swedish football goalkeeper
- Maj Jacobsson (later Widlund, 1909–1996), Swedish athlete
- Olof B. Widlund (born 1938), Swedish-American mathematician
