= Gunnar Olsson =

Gunnar Olsson may refer to:

- Gunnar Olsson (actor) (1904–1983), Swedish film actor and director
- Gunnar Olsson (canoeist) (born 1960), Swedish Olympic flatwater canoeist
- Gunnar Olsson (footballer, born 1901)
- Gunnar Olsson (footballer, born 1908) (1908–1974), Swedish soccer player
