= Eivar =

Eivar may refer to:

- Eivar, North Khorasan, a village in Iran
- Eivar Widlund (1905-1968), Swedish footballer
