= Rudolf Berg =

Rudolf Berg may refer to:

- Rudolf Fredrik Berg (1846–1907), also known as R.F. Berg and Fritz Berg, Swedish engineer, industrialist and politician
- Rudolf van den Berg (born 1949), Dutch writer and director
- Rudolf Berg, pseudonym of Dietrich Klagges (1891–1971), Nazi politician

== See also ==
- Berg (surname)
