= Harry Andersson =

Swedish footballer

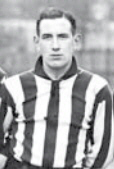
- Harry Andersson, c. 1935

Personal information
- Full name: Harry Emanuel Andersson
- Date of birth: March 7, 1913
- Place of birth: Norrköping, Sweden
- Date of death: June 6, 1996 (aged 83)
- Position: Forward

Senior career*
Years	Team	Apps	(Gls)
1932–1944	IK Sleipner		

International career
1938	Sweden	3	(3)
- * Club domestic league appearances and goals

Harry Emanuel Andersson (7 March 1913 – 6 June 1996) was a Swedish football striker.

He played for IK Sleipner and was the top scorer of the 1934–35 Allsvenskan. Andersson also played for the Sweden men's national football team, for whom he appeared in the 1938 FIFA World Cup in France, at which he scored three goals.

== Career statistics ==
=== International ===
Appearances and goals by national team and year
National team	Year	Apps	Goals
Sweden	1938	3	3
Total		3	3

Scores and results list Sweden's goal tally first, score column indicates score after each Andersson goal.

List of international goals scored by Harry Andersson
No.	Date	Venue	Opponent	Score	Result	Competition	Ref.
1	12 June 1938	Stade du Fort Carré, Antibes, France	Cuba	1–0	8–0	1938 FIFA World Cup	
2	12 June 1938	Stade du Fort Carré, Antibes, France	Cuba	6–0	8–0	1938 FIFA World Cup	
3	12 June 1938	Stade du Fort Carré, Antibes, France	Cuba	8–0	8–0	1938 FIFA World Cup	

== Honours ==
Individual

- Allsvenskan top scorer: 1934–35
