= Einar Karlsson (footballer) =

Swedish footballer

Personal information
- Date of birth: 1 August 1909
- Place of birth: Sweden
- Date of death: 23 October 1967 (aged 58)
- Position: Forward

Senior career*
Years	Team	Apps	(Gls)
- Gårda BK

International career
1935–1938	Sweden	3	(0)
- * Club domestic league appearances and goals

Einar Karlsson (1 August 1909 – 23 October 1967) was a Swedish football forward who played for Gårda BK and Team Sweden.
