= 1935–36 Allsvenskan =

12th season of Allsvenskan

Allsvenskan
- Season: 1935–36
- Champions: IF Elfsborg
- Relegated: Halmstads BK; IFK Eskilstuna
- Top goalscorer: Sven Jonasson, IF Elfsborg (24)
- Average attendance: 6,933

Statistics of Allsvenskan in season 1935/1936.

== Overview ==
The league was contested by 12 teams, with IF Elfsborg winning the championship.

== League table ==
Pos	Team	Pld	W	D	L	GF	GA	GD	Pts	Qualification or relegation
1	IF Elfsborg (C)	22	15	4	3	71	33	+38	34	
2	AIK	22	13	4	5	58	39	+19	30	
3	Sandvikens IF	22	11	5	6	40	32	+8	27	
4	IFK Göteborg	22	9	7	6	36	28	+8	25	
5	Landskrona BoIS	22	10	4	8	46	34	+12	24	
6	Gårda	22	9	6	7	27	28	−1	24	
7	Örgryte IS	22	9	3	10	38	41	−3	21	
8	IK Sleipner	22	8	3	11	51	48	+3	19	
9	IFK Norrköping	22	5	8	9	40	51	−11	18	
10	GAIS	22	6	6	10	29	44	−15	18	
11	Halmstads BK (R)	22	5	7	10	31	46	−15	17	Relegation to Division 2
12	IFK Eskilstuna (R)	22	1	5	16	24	67	−43	7	Relegation to Division 2

Rules for classification: 1) points; 2) goal difference; 3) number of goals scored.
(C) Champions; (R) Relegated

== Results ==
Home \ Away	AIK	GAIS	GBK	HBK	IFE	IFKE	IFKG	IFKN	IKS	BOIS	SIF	ÖIS
AIK		2–0	2–1	3–3	2–3	3–2	4–0	5–2	3–2	4–2	4–4	4–1
GAIS	0–2		1–1	2–2	1–2	3–1	0–5	3–1	5–3	1–1	1–1	1–0
Gårda BK	1–3	1–3		1–1	3–2	0–0	1–0	3–1	2–1	1–5	0–1	2–0
Halmstads BK	2–1	1–1	0–1		1–2	1–0	1–1	1–4	4–2	3–1	2–1	2–2
IF Elfsborg	4–1	2–0	1–1	4–2		7–1	1–0	1–1	4–2	3–0	4–1	4–1
IFK Eskilstuna	1–3	1–2	0–2	3–2	2–12		2–5	1–1	1–1	2–5	0–1	0–0
IFK Göteborg	1–0	3–0	0–0	3–0	1–1	4–1		1–1	0–4	1–0	2–2	0–0
IFK Norrköping	0–2	1–0	2–2	2–2	3–3	2–2	5–1		2–3	2–2	1–4	5–1
IK Sleipner	3–3	5–1	1–2	1–0	5–3	2–0	2–4	5–0		3–3	1–0	1–2
Landskrona BoIS	3–2	1–1	1–0	3–0	1–2	6–2	1–0	5–0	3–2		0–2	1–2
Sandvikens IF	3–3	4–3	3–1	4–1	2–1	1–0	1–1	0–1	2–1	1–0		1–3
Örgryte IS	1–2	4–0	0–1	4–0	2–5	4–2	1–3	4–3	4–1	0–2	2–1	

Legend: Blue = home team win; Yellow = draw; Red = away team win.

== Attendances ==
#	Club	Average	Highest
1	AIK	15,198	18,883
2	IFK Göteborg	10,273	25,639
3	Gårda BK	9,431	25,639
4	IK Sleipner	7,251	10,875
5	IF Elfsborg	7,226	16,348
6	Örgryte IS	6,980	13,394
7	GAIS	5,908	9,144
8	IFK Norrköping	5,484	13,179
9	IFK Eskilstuna	4,293	9,575
10	Halmstads BK	4,184	6,988
11	Sandvikens IF	4,118	7,300
12	Landskrona BoIS	3,299	5,412
