= Otto Rohwedder =

German football and manager

Personal information
- Full name: Otto Rohwedder
- Date of birth: 3 December 1909
- Place of birth: Hamburg, German Empire
- Date of death: 15 June 1969 (aged 59)
- Place of death: Germany
- Position: Forward

Youth career
- –192?: Eimsbütteler TV

Senior career*
Years	Team	Apps	(Gls)
192?–1932	Eimsbütteler TV		
1932–1933	Arminia Hannover		
1933–1939	Eimsbütteler TV		
1939–1943	Hamburger SV		
1944	HSV Groß Born		
1944–1946	Hamburger SV		

International career
1934–1937	Germany	5	(2)

Managerial career
- 1942–1943: Hamburger SV (player-manager)
- 1943–1944: Hamburger SV (player-manager)
- * Club domestic league appearances and goals

Otto Rohwedder (3 December 1909 – 15 June 1969) was a German footballer and manager who played as a forward and made five appearances for the Germany national team.

== Career ==
Rohwedder made his international debut for Germany on 7 October 1934 in a friendly against Denmark. He scored Germany's third goal in the away match, which took place in Copenhagen and finished as a 5–2 win. He went on to earn five caps and score two goals for Germany, making his final appearance on 25 April 1937 in a friendly against Belgium, which finished as a 1–0 win in Hanover.

== Personal life ==
Rohwedder died on 15 June 1969 at the age of 59.

== Career statistics ==
=== International ===
Germany
Year	Apps	Goals
1934	1	1
1935	3	1
1937	1	0
Total	5	2

=== International goals ===
No.	Date	Venue	Opponent	Score	Result	Competition
1	7 October 1934	Idrætspark, Copenhagen, Denmark	Denmark	3–1	5–2	Friendly
2	30 June 1935	Olympic Stadium, Stockholm, Sweden	Sweden	1–3	1–3	Friendly
