= 1941–42 Allsvenskan =

18th season of Allsvenskan

Allsvenskan
- Season: 1941–42
- Champions: IFK Göteborg
- Relegated: Landskrona BoIS; Reymersholms IK
- Top goalscorer: Sven Jacobsson, GAIS (20)
- Average attendance: 5,705

Statistics of Allsvenskan in season 1941/1942.

== Overview ==
The league was contested by 12 teams, with IFK Göteborg winning the championship.

== League table ==
Pos	Team	Pld	W	D	L	GF	GA	GD	Pts	Qualification or relegation
1	IFK Göteborg (C)	22	14	3	5	48	29	+19	31	
2	GAIS	22	10	7	5	46	31	+15	27	
3	IFK Norrköping	22	12	2	8	50	35	+15	26	
4	Hälsingborgs IF	22	11	4	7	42	27	+15	26	
5	Malmö FF	22	9	7	6	37	33	+4	25	
6	Degerfors IF	22	9	5	8	43	35	+8	23	
7	IF Elfsborg	22	8	6	8	35	29	+6	22	
8	Gårda	22	9	4	9	34	46	−12	22	
9	AIK	22	7	7	8	37	34	+3	21	
10	Sandvikens IF	22	6	3	13	27	45	−18	15	
11	Landskrona BoIS (R)	22	5	4	13	22	47	−25	14	Relegation to Division 2
12	Reymersholm (R)	22	4	4	14	27	57	−30	12	Relegation to Division 2

Rules for classification: 1) points; 2) goal difference; 3) number of goals scored.
(C) Champions; (R) Relegated

== Results ==
Home \ Away	AIK	DIF	GAIS	GBK	HIF	IFE	IFKG	IFKN	BOIS	MFF	RIK	SIF
AIK		0–1	2–2	4–2	3–1	0–0	2–3	1–0	1–2	1–1	4–1	2–1
Degerfors IF	2–2		1–1	4–2	2–1	3–1	4–1	2–0	0–1	1–3	2–2	8–0
GAIS	2–2	1–1		4–1	1–1	1–1	3–1	5–2	6–3	1–1	1–2	3–1
Gårda BK	2–1	1–0	2–1		0–0	1–1	1–6	1–4	3–0	2–0	2–2	1–0
Hälsingborgs IF	1–1	0–1	0–2	6–0		4–1	2–1	3–2	2–0	2–2	2–0	2–0
IF Elfsborg	1–0	3–0	2–1	2–3	2–3		1–1	2–1	0–0	4–0	6–1	1–2
IFK Göteborg	3–2	3–2	3–0	2–0	2–1	2–1		2–1	4–0	2–0	3–0	2–0
IFK Norrköping	4–1	3–1	1–3	3–2	3–0	2–1	4–1		5–1	2–2	2–1	2–2
Landskrona BoIS	1–1	3–4	0–3	1–4	1–3	0–2	0–0	1–2		3–2	3–1	1–0
Malmö FF	0–3	1–1	1–0	2–0	2–1	4–1	2–0	2–1	1–1		2–2	2–3
Reymersholms IK	1–3	3–2	1–2	2–3	0–3	0–2	2–2	1–5	2–0	0–4		3–1
Sandvikens IF	3–1	3–1	2–3	1–1	1–4	0–0	1–4	0–1	1–0	2–3	3–0	

Legend: Blue = home team win; Yellow = draw; Red = away team win.

== Attendances ==
#	Club	Average	Highest
1	IFK Göteborg	9,692	12,671
2	Malmö FF	8,291	11,596
3	AIK	7,586	11,186
4	Reymersholms IK	7,449	10,573
5	GAIS	6,665	13,701
6	Hälsingborgs IF	6,181	9,131
7	IFK Norrköping	5,051	12,218
8	IF Elfsborg	4,855	7,669
9	Gårda BK	4,340	7,104
10	Degerfors IF	2,698	4,800
11	Landskrona BoIS	2,581	4,773
12	Sandvikens IF	2,241	3,302
