= Maj Jacobsson =

Swedish athletics competitor

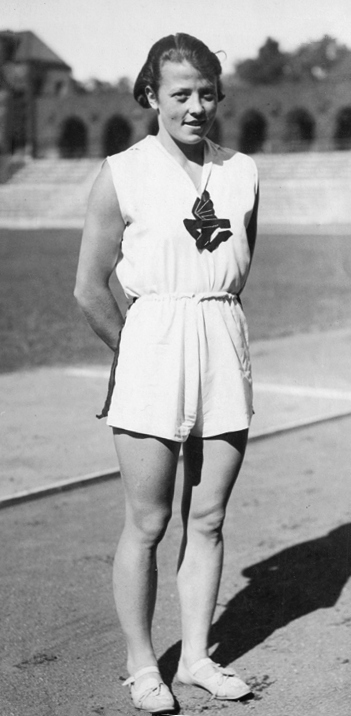
- Maj Jacobsson, circa 1930

Personal information
- Born: 25 November 1909 Stockholm, Sweden
- Died: 31 January 1996 (aged 86) Stockholm, Sweden

Sport
- Sport: Athletics
- Event(s): 80 m hurdles, 200 m, long jump
- Club: IK Göta

Achievements and titles
- Personal best(s): 80 mH – 12.1 (1930); 200 m – 27.1 (1930); LJ – 5.38 m (1930)
Medal record
Representing Sweden
Women's World Games
| Gold medal – first place | 1930 Prague | 80 m hurdles |

Maj Jacobsson (25 November 1909 – 31 January 1996) was a Swedish athlete who won the 80 metres hurdles event at the 1930 Women's World Games.

== Biography ==
Domestically she won eight titles in 1929–1930, in the 80 metres, 80 metres hurdles, 200 metres, long jump and standing long jump.

In August 1930, she won the national titles in 80 metres, 200 metres, 80 metres hurdles, long jump, standing long jump and 4 × 80 metres relay at the Swedish Women's Athletics Championships in Norrköping. On 2 September 1930, she broke the 80 metres hurdles world record with a time of 12.1. Later the same year, she competed at the 1930 Women's World Games, and won the 80 metres hurdles event and finished fourth in the long jump event.

During her career, she set Swedish records in 80 metres, 200 metres, 80 metres hurdles (four times), long jump, standing long jump and triathlon. Jacobsson represented Stockholms KBK in 1929 and IK Göta in 1930, which was the year she ended her career.

She was married to Eivar Widlund, an association football goalkeeper.
