= 1934–35 Allsvenskan =

11th season of Allsvenskan

Allsvenskan
- Season: 1934–35
- Champions: IFK Göteborg
- Relegated: Hälsingborgs IF; Gefle IF
- Top goalscorer: Harry Andersson, IK Sleipner (23)
- Average attendance: 6,848

Statistics of Allsvenskan in season 1934/1935.

== Overview ==
The league was contested by 12 teams, with IFK Göteborg winning the championship.

== League table ==
Pos	Team	Pld	W	D	L	GF	GA	GD	Pts	Qualification or relegation
1	IFK Göteborg (C)	22	15	3	4	48	22	+26	33	
2	AIK	22	11	6	5	59	28	+31	28	
3	IF Elfsborg	22	13	2	7	59	43	+16	28	
4	Sandvikens IF	22	12	4	6	46	46	0	28	
5	GAIS	22	10	4	8	44	49	−5	24	
6	Landskrona BoIS	22	10	2	10	47	47	0	22	
7	IK Sleipner	22	9	3	10	55	49	+6	21	
8	Örgryte IS	22	9	2	11	40	42	−2	20	
9	Halmstads BK	22	7	5	10	33	39	−6	19	
10	IFK Eskilstuna	22	7	4	11	37	52	−15	18	
11	Hälsingborgs IF (R)	22	5	5	12	40	49	−9	15	Relegation to Division 2
12	Gefle IF (R)	22	2	4	16	37	79	−42	8	Relegation to Division 2

Rules for classification: 1) points; 2) goal difference; 3) number of goals scored.
(C) Champions; (R) Relegated

== Results ==
Home \ Away	AIK	GAIS	GIF	HBK	HIF	IFE	IFKE	IFKG	IKS	BOIS	SIF	ÖIS
AIK		4–1	2–2	0–3	3–3	7–2	4–1	3–0	6–1	0–2	7–1	3–0
GAIS	1–1		3–1	0–6	1–1	2–0	4–0	0–4	2–1	2–8	1–2	2–1
Gefle IF	1–4	3–3		3–1	1–1	2–6	4–1	1–2	3–7	2–2	2–5	1–2
Halmstads BK	0–0	2–1	4–2		0–1	1–1	2–1	0–2	1–3	2–1	0–0	1–3
Hälsingborgs IF	1–1	0–4	3–1	4–0		3–4	2–3	2–2	5–4	1–3	0–1	0–1
IF Elfsborg	2–1	1–4	3–1	3–2	5–1		3–3	2–0	3–1	5–1	2–4	2–1
IFK Eskilstuna	3–2	1–2	4–1	5–2	2–1	1–6		3–2	2–0	1–3	0–2	0–1
IFK Göteborg	1–0	5–2	7–3	1–0	4–1	1–0	3–0		2–0	2–1	3–0	1–0
IK Sleipner	1–1	1–2	5–1	2–2	4–2	4–0	3–3	2–1		6–2	3–1	4–1
Landskrona BoIS	0–4	3–1	6–0	1–2	0–5	0–4	2–0	1–1	3–0		5–0	1–0
Sandvikens IF	1–3	3–3	3–1	3–0	3–2	3–2	1–1	0–0	4–2	3–1		5–2
Örgryte IS	1–3	1–3	5–1	2–2	2–1	0–3	2–2	1–4	2–1	6–1	6–1	

Legend: Blue = home team win; Yellow = draw; Red = away team win.

== Attendances ==
#	Club	Average	Highest
1	AIK	15,329	19,742
2	IFK Göteborg	10,883	21,740
3	Örgryte IS	8,294	18,595
4	IK Sleipner	7,991	11,262
5	GAIS	7,443	14,272
6	IFK Eskilstuna	5,662	12,980
7	IF Elfsborg	5,563	10,046
8	Hälsingborgs IF	4,850	8,930
9	Halmstads BK	4,751	7,796
10	Sandvikens IF	4,298	8,110
11	Gefle IF	3,957	6,522
12	Landskrona BoIS	2,543	4,972
