= Holger Johansson =

Swedish footballer (1911–1992)

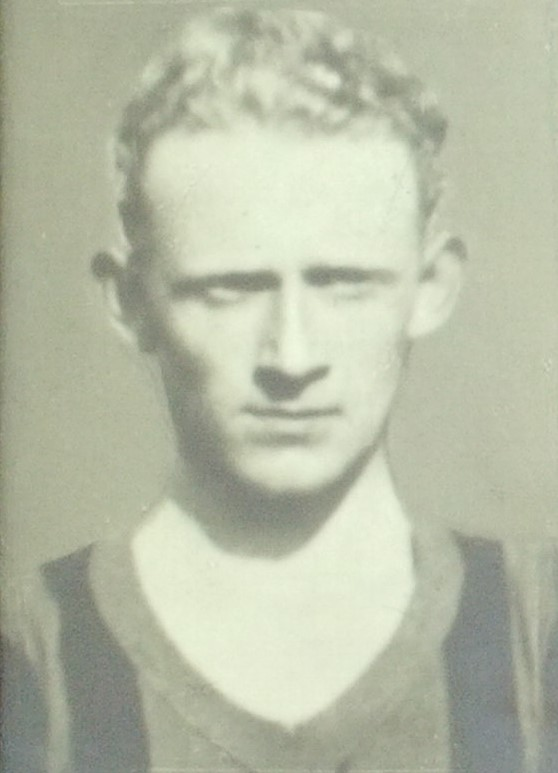

Personal information
- Date of birth: 18 January 1911
- Place of birth: Gothenburg, Sweden
- Date of death: 14 February 1992 (aged 81)
- Position: Forward

International career
| Years | Team | Apps | (Gls) |
| 1932 | Sweden | 2 | (2) |

Holger Johansson (18 January 1911 – 14 February 1992) was a Swedish footballer who played as a forward. He made two appearances for the Sweden national team in 1932. He was also part of Sweden's squad for the football tournament at the 1936 Summer Olympics, but he did not play in any matches.

Johansson played for GAIS.
