= Curt Bergsten =

Swedish footballer (1912–1987)

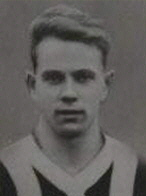

Personal information
- Date of birth: 24 June 1912
- Place of birth: Sweden
- Date of death: 21 July 1987 (aged 75)
- Position: Forward

Senior career*
| Years | Team | Apps | (Gls) |
- Landskrona BoIS

International career
- Sweden
- * Club domestic league appearances and goals

Curt Bergsten (24 June 1912 – 21 July 1987) was a Swedish football forward who played for Sweden in the 1938 FIFA World Cup. He also played for Landskrona BoIS.
