= Rune Carlsson =

German footballer (1945)

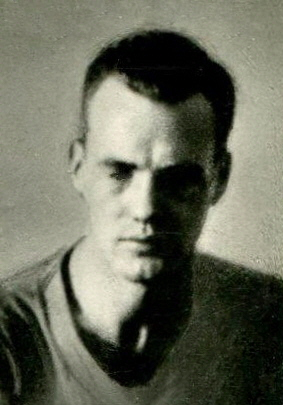

Personal information
- Date of birth: 1 October 1909
- Place of birth: Sweden
- Date of death: 14 September 1943 (aged 33)
- Position: Midfielder

Senior career*
Years	Team	Apps	(Gls)
- IFK Eskilstuna

International career
- Sweden
- * Club domestic league appearances and goals

Rune Carlsson (1 October 1909 – 14 September 1943) was a Swedish football midfielder who played for Sweden in the 1934 FIFA World Cup. He also played for IFK Eskilstuna.
