= Valter Sköld =

Swedish footballer

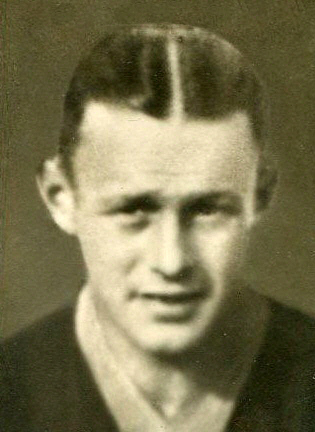

Personal information
- Full name: Sven Erland Valter Sköld
- Date of birth: 12 February 1910
- Place of birth: Enebyberg, Sweden
- Date of death: 12 December 1975 (aged 65)
- Position: Defender

International career
Years	Team	Apps	(Gls)
1935–1938	Sweden	8	(0)

Sven Erland Valter Sköld (12 February 1910 – 12 December 1975) was a Swedish footballer who played as a defender. He made eight appearances for the Sweden national team from 1935 to 1938. He was also part of Sweden's squad for the football tournament at the 1936 Summer Olympics, but he did not play in any matches.
