= Sture Hult =

Swedish footballer

Personal information
- Full name: Sture Eskil Holger Hult
- Date of birth: 19 October 1910
- Place of birth: Åmål, Sweden
- Date of death: 9 November 1995 (aged 85)
- Position: Goalkeeper

Senior career*
| Years | Team | Apps | (Gls) |
| 1928–1934 | IFK Eskilstuna | | |

International career
| 1932–1934 | Sweden | 5 | (0) |
- * Club domestic league appearances and goals

Sture Eskil Holger Hult (19 October 1910 – 9 November 1995) was a Swedish football goalkeeper.

== International career ==
Hult won his first international cap for the Sweden national team against Finland on 10 June 1932. His fifth and last cap was against Lithuania on 25 September 1932.

== Death ==
Hult died on 9 November 1995 aged 85.
