= Erik Källström =

Swedish footballer

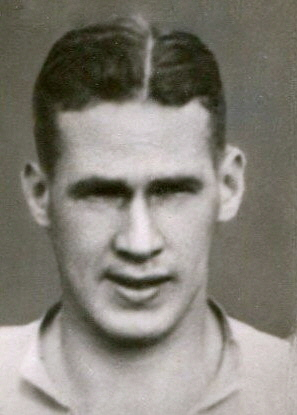

Personal information
- Date of birth: 5 March 1908
- Place of birth: Borås, Sweden
- Date of death: 16 January 1997 (aged 88)
- Place of death: Borås, Sweden

International career
Years	Team	Apps	(Gls)
- Sweden

Erik Källström (5 March 1908 – 16 January 1997) was a Swedish footballer. He competed in the men's tournament at the 1936 Summer Olympics.
