= Åke Hallman =

Swedish footballer

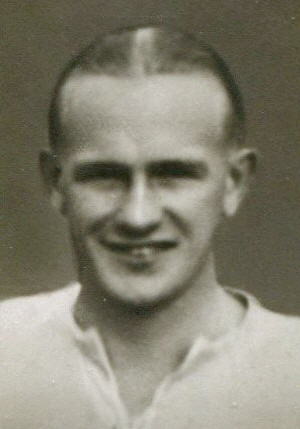

Personal information
- Date of birth: 12 November 1912
- Place of birth: Borås, Sweden
- Date of death: 21 June 1973 (aged 60)
- Place of death: Borås, Sweden

International career
| Years | Team | Apps | (Gls) |
- Sweden

Åke Hallman (12 November 1912 – 21 June 1973) was a Swedish footballer. He competed in the men's tournament at the 1936 Summer Olympics.
