= Åke Samuelsson =

Swedish footballer

Personal information
- Full name: Åke Henry Samuelsson
- Date of birth: 23 October 1913
- Place of birth: Borås, Sweden
- Date of death: 4 July 1995 (aged 81)
- Place of death: Borås, Sweden
- Position: Forward

Senior career*
| Years | Team | Apps | (Gls) |
- Elfsborg

International career
| 1935–1936 | Sweden | 3 | (3) |
- * Club domestic league appearances and goals

Åke Henry Samuelsson (23 October 1913 – 4 July 1995) was a Swedish footballer who played for Elfsborg. He featured three times for the Sweden men's national football team in 1935 and 1936, scoring three goals.

== Career statistics ==
=== International ===
Appearances and goals by national team and year
| National team | Year | Apps | Goals |
|---|---|---|---|
| Sweden | 1935 | 2 | 3 |
| Sweden | 1936 | 1 | 0 |
| Total | | 3 | 3 |

=== International goals ===
Scores and results list Sweden's goal tally first.

| No | Date | Venue | Opponent | Score | Result | Competition |
|---|---|---|---|---|---|---|
| 1. | 5 July 1935 | J.K.S. Stadions, Riga, Latvia | Latvia | 3–0 | 3–0 | Friendly |
| 2. | 9 July 1935 | Kadrioru Stadium, Tallinn, Estonia | Estonia | 1–0 | 2–1 | Friendly |
| 3. | 9 July 1935 | Kadrioru Stadium, Tallinn, Estonia | Estonia | 2–0 | 2–1 | Friendly |
