= Gunnar Jansson (footballer) =

Swedish footballer

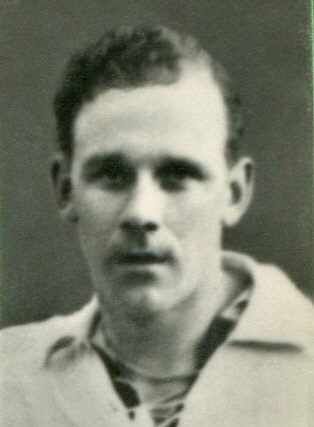
- Swedish Footballer

Personal information
- Date of birth: March 28, 1908
- Place of birth: Gävle, Sweden
- Date of death: April 10, 1981 (aged 73)
- Place of death: Uppsala, Sweden
- Position: Forward

Senior career*
Years	Team	Apps	(Gls)
- Gefle IF

International career
- Sweden
- * Club domestic league appearances and goals

Gunnar Alexius Jansson (28 March 1908 – 10 April 1981) was a Swedish football forward who played for Sweden in the 1934 FIFA World Cup. He also played for Gefle IF.
