= Helge Liljebjörn =

Swedish footballer

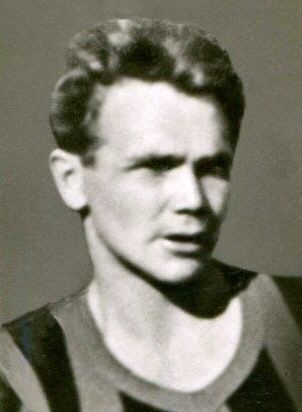

Personal information
- Date of birth: 16 August 1904
- Place of birth: Sweden
- Date of death: 2 May 1952 (aged 47)
- Position: Midfielder

Senior career*
Years	Team	Apps	(Gls)
1928–1937	GAIS	181	(7)

International career
- Sweden

Managerial career
- 1941–1943: GAIS
- * Club domestic league appearances and goals

Helge Liljebjörn (16 August 1904 – 2 May 1952) was a Swedish football midfielder who played for the Sweden national team. He was a reserve in the 1934 FIFA World Cup. He also played for GAIS.
