= Gunnar Olsson (footballer, born 1908) =

Swedish footballer

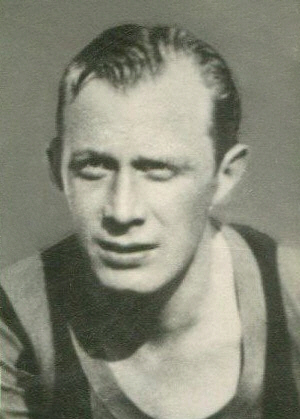

Personal information
- Full name: Olof Gunnar Olsson
- Date of birth: 19 July 1908
- Place of birth: Sweden
- Date of death: 27 September 1974 (aged 66)
- Position: Forward

Senior career*
Years	Team	Apps	(Gls)
1926–1937	GAIS	122	(44)

International career
- Sweden
- * Club domestic league appearances and goals

Olof Gunnar Olsson (19 July 1908 – 27 September 1974) was a Swedish football forward who played for Sweden in the 1934 FIFA World Cup. He also played for GAIS.
