= Eivar Widlund =

Swedish footballer

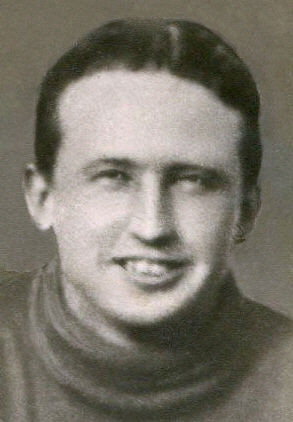
- Eivar Widlund ca. 1935 .

Personal information
- Date of birth: 15 June 1906
- Place of birth: Örebro, Sweden
- Date of death: 31 March 1968 (aged 61)
- Place of death: Stockholm, Sweden
- Position: Goalkeeper

Senior career*
Years	Team	Apps	(Gls)
–1928	Örebro SK		
1929–1935	AIK Fotboll	131	(0)

International career
1930–1932	Sweden	5	(0)
- * Club domestic league appearances and goals

Eivar Widlund (15 June 1906 – 31 March 1968) was a Swedish football goalkeeper who played for AIK. He also represented Team Sweden in the 1934 FIFA World Cup in Italy.

He was married to Maj Jacobsson, an international track and field athlete.
