= Gösta Dunker =

Swedish footballer and manager

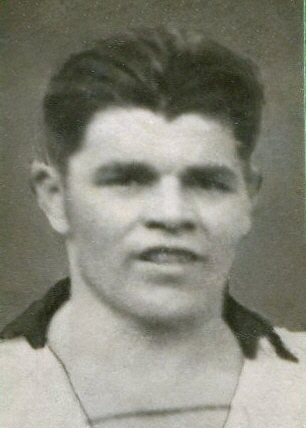

Personal information
- Full name: Gösta Dunker
- Date of birth: September 16, 1905
- Place of birth: Sweden
- Date of death: June 5, 1973 (aged 67)
- Position: Forward

International career
Years	Team	Apps	(Gls)
1928–1934	Sweden	15	(5)

Gösta Dunker (16 September 1905 – 5 June 1973) was a Swedish footballer from who participated in 1934 FIFA World Cup, scoring one goal in the game versus Germany.

Dunker spent most of his career in Sandvikens IF. From 1948 to 1950 he was a coach of Örebro SK.

== Career statistics ==
=== International ===
Appearances and goals by national team and year

National team	Year	Apps	Goals
Sweden	1928	1	0
Sweden	1929	0	0
Sweden	1930	3	2
Sweden	1931	1	0
Sweden	1932	7	1
Sweden	1933	1	1
Sweden	1934	2	1
Total		15	5

Scores and results list Sweden's goal tally first, score column indicates score after each Dunker goal.

List of international goals scored by Gösta Dunker
No.	Date	Venue	Opponent	Score	Result	Competition	Ref.
1	22 July 1930	JKS Stadium, Riga, Latvia	Latvia	3–0	5–0	Friendly	
2	22 July 1930	JKS Stadium, Riga, Latvia	Latvia	5–0	5–0	Friendly	
3	15 July 1932	Kadriorg Stadium, Tallinn, Estonia	Estonia	2–0	3–1	Friendly	
4	24 September 1933	Ullevaal Stadium, Oslo, Norway	Norway	1–0	1–0	1933–36 Nordic Football Championship	
5	31 May 1934	San Siro, Milan, Italy	Germany	1–2	1–2	1934 FIFA World Cup	
