= Ernst Andersson =

Swedish footballer

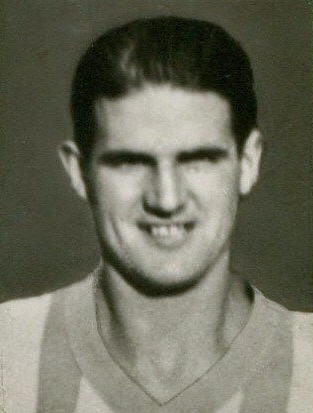

Personal information
- Date of birth: 26 March 1909
- Place of birth: Sweden
- Date of death: 9 October 1989 (aged 80)
- Place of death: Sweden
- Position: Midfielder

Youth career
- IFK Göteborg

Senior career*
Years	Team	Apps	(Gls)
1927–1943	IFK Göteborg	296	(6)

International career
1931–1937	Sweden	29	(0)

Managerial career
- 1941–1942: IFK Göteborg
- * Club domestic league appearances and goals

Ernst Andersson (26 March 1909 – 9 October 1989) was a Swedish footballer who played for IFK Göteborg. He represented Sweden at the 1934 FIFA World Cup.

== Honours ==
IFK Göteborg

- Allsvenskan: 1934–35, 1941–42
