= Victor Carlund =

Swedish footballer (1906–1985)

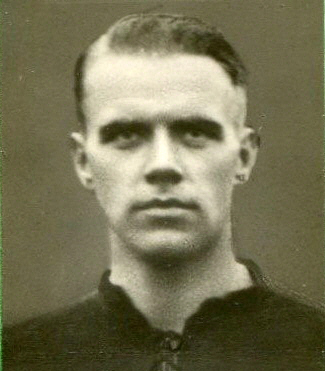

Personal information
- Date of birth: February 5, 1906
- Place of birth: Gothenburg, Sweden
- Date of death: 22 February 1985
- Position: Midfielder

Senior career*
Years	Team	Apps	(Gls)
- Örgryte IS

International career
- Sweden
- * Club domestic league appearances and goals

Victor Carlund (5 February 1906 – 22 February 1985) was a Swedish footballer who played as a midfielder for the Sweden national team. He was a reserve in the 1934 FIFA World Cup, and played for Sweden at the 1936 Summer Olympics. He also played for Örgryte IS.
