= Rudolf Fredrik Berg =

Swedish engineer, industrialist and politician

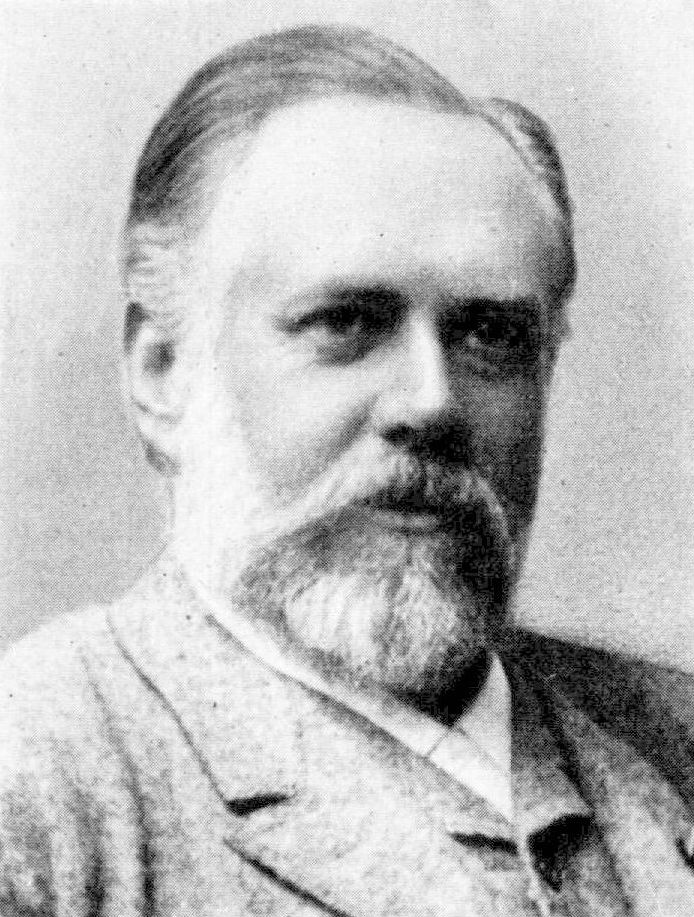
Rudolf Fredrik Berg

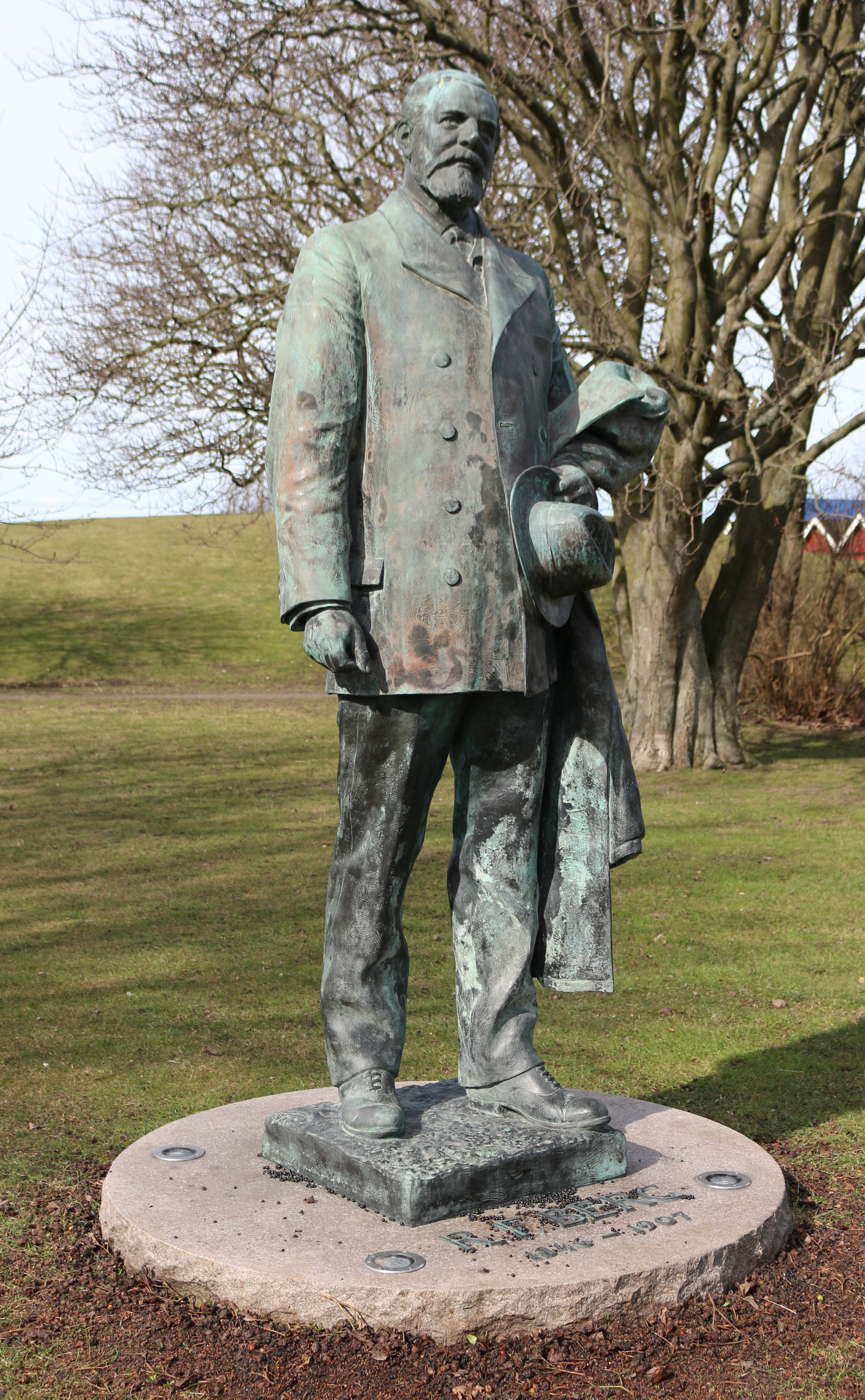
Statue of Rudolf Fredrik Berg in Limhamn

Rudolf Fredrik Berg (31 May 1846 – 8 December 1907), also known as R.F. Berg and Fritz Berg, was a Swedish engineer, industrialist and politician. He also founded the Swedish construction and development company Skanska.

== Career ==
Between 1865 and 1868, Berg attended Teknologiska Institutet. In 1873, he became the managing director of Skånska Cement AB (now Cementa [Cementation]). Berg made significant contributions to the cement industry and its development. In 1887, he founded the entrepreneurial company AB Skånska Cementgjuteriet, later known as Skanska. He led a number of other companies, such as Malmö-Limhamns Railroads and AB Stranden. He was a council member in Malmö from 1892 and vice president in 1907.

Berg had a strong social commitment and was popular amongst the working class and fisher population in Limhamn, Sweden. Berg also founded the lecture society Malmö föreläsarförning that expanded to Malmö's library and lecture society in 1882. Berg was the founder and creator of the Betel church at Lugnet in Malmö, which was first opened in 1886. With Anders Antonsson and Thure Petrén, he took the initiative to start the first employment office in Malmö which opened in 1905.

Berg was a member of the board of the Swedish employment association during the last years of his life, worked for a fair work bill and supported Gustav Möller, who was one of Berg's employers and later a politician in the Swedish government. A supporter of equal rights for workers and owners, Berg is considered the founder of the "Svenska modellen" (the Swedish model).

== Death ==
Berg died on 8 December 1907, the same day King Oscar II died. Berg's brother was the king's medical doctor, and had to attend at the king's deathbed, preventing him from reaching his own brother to help him.

Berg's funeral in Limhamn in December 1907 was attended by about 700 people, including many workers and fishermen. A statue of Berg was erected in Limhamn and many locations in the city are named for him, such as R.F. Bergsgatan, Bergaskolan and R.F. Bergs kindergarten.
