= Ragnar Gustavsson =

Swedish footballer

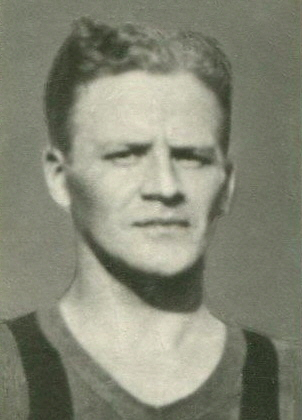

Personal information
- Date of birth: 28 September 1907
- Place of birth: Gothenburg, Sweden
- Date of death: 19 May 1980 (aged 72)
- Position: Forward

Senior career*
Years	Team	Apps	(Gls)
1929–1936	GAIS	109	(57)

International career
1932–1934	Sweden	9	(3)
- * Club domestic league appearances and goals

Ragnar Gustavsson (28 September 1907 – 19 May 1980) was a Swedish football forward who played for Sweden in the 1934 FIFA World Cup. He also played for GAIS.
