= Otto Andersson (footballer) =

Swedish footballer

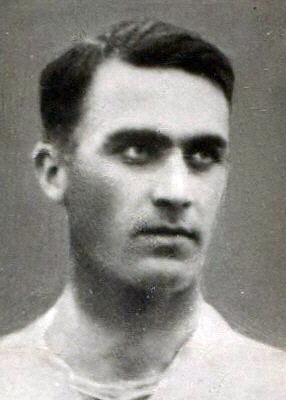

Personal information
- Date of birth: 7 May 1910
- Place of birth: Sweden
- Date of death: 11 August 1977 (aged 67)
- Position: Defender

Senior career*
| Years | Team | Apps | (Gls) |
| 1931–1937 | Örgryte IS | ? | (?) |

International career
| 1933–1936 | Sweden | 15 | (0) |
- * Club domestic league appearances and goals

Otto Andersson (7 May 1910 – 11 August 1977) was a Swedish football defender. During his career he made three appearances for the Sweden national team, and played at the 1936 Summer Olympics. His career in club football was spent in Örgryte IS.

== Honours ==
- Allsvenskan:
  - Runners-up (1): 1931–1932
