= Tore Keller =

Swedish footballer

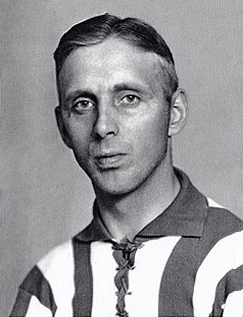
- Tore Keller in the 1930s

Personal information
- Date of birth: January 4, 1905
- Place of birth: Norrköping, Sweden
- Date of death: July 15, 1988 (aged 83)
- Place of death: Norrköping, Sweden
- Height: 1.84 m (6 ft 0 in)
- Position: Striker

Senior career*
Years	Team	Apps	(Gls)
1924–1940	IK Sleipner	305	(152)

International career
1929	Sweden B	1	(1)
1924–1938	Sweden	25	(16)
Medal record
Representing Sweden
Olympic Games
Bronze medal – third place	1924 Paris	Team
- * Club domestic league appearances and goals

Tore Bertil Gottfrid Keller (4 January 1905 – 15 July 1988) was a Swedish footballer who played as a striker. He was part of the Sweden team that won the bronze medal at the 1924 Summer Olympics.

He played 305 matches for IK Sleipner and scored 152 goals and became the Swedish champion with the club in 1938. Internationally he appeared in the 1934 and 1938 FIFA World Cups. Keller was also a keen bandy, table tennis and bowling player.

== Career statistics ==
=== International ===
Appearances and goals by national team and year
National team	Year	Apps	Goals
Sweden	1924	6	3
Sweden	1925	2	1
Sweden	1926	2	1
Sweden	1927	1	3
Sweden	1928	3	2
Sweden	1929	0	0
Sweden	1930	1	0
Sweden	1931	0	0
Sweden	1932	0	0
Sweden	1933	2	0
Sweden	1934	4	4
Sweden	1935	1	1
Sweden	1936	0	0
Sweden	1937	0	0
Sweden	1938	3	1
Total		25	16

Scores and results list Sweden's goal tally first, score column indicates score after each Keller goal.

List of international goals scored by Tore Keller
No.	Date	Venue	Opponent	Score	Result	Competition	Ref.
1	29 June 1924	Stockholm Olympic Stadium, Stockholm, Sweden	Egypt	1–0	5–0	Friendly	
2	25 July 1924	Stockholm Olympic Stadium, Stockholm, Sweden	Estonia	2–1	5–2	Friendly	
3	21 September 1924	Råsunda Stadium, Solna, Sweden	Norway	1–0	6–1	1924–28 Nordic Football Championship	
4	5 July 1925	Stockholm Olympic Stadium, Stockholm, Sweden	Austria	2–4	2–4	Friendly	
5	3 October 1926	Stockholm Olympic Stadium, Stockholm, Sweden	Poland	3–0	3–1	Friendly	
6	1 July 1927	Idrottsparken, Norrköping, Sweden	Estonia	1–0	3–1	Friendly	
7	1 July 1927	Idrottsparken, Norrköping, Sweden	Estonia	2–0	3–1	Friendly	
8	1 July 1927	Idrottsparken, Norrköping, Sweden	Estonia	3–0	3–1	Friendly	
9	7 June 1928	Stockholm Olympic Stadium, Stockholm, Sweden	Norway	1–0	6–1	1924–28 Nordic Football Championship	
10	7 June 1928	Stockholm Olympic Stadium, Stockholm, Sweden	Norway	5–1	6–1	1924–28 Nordic Football Championship	
11	23 May 1934	Stockholm Olympic Stadium, Stockholm, Sweden	Poland	2–1	4–2	Friendly	
12	23 May 1934	Stockholm Olympic Stadium, Stockholm, Sweden	Poland	3–2	4–2	Friendly	
13	23 May 1934	Stockholm Olympic Stadium, Stockholm, Sweden	Poland	4–2	4–2	Friendly	
14	23 September 1934	Töölön Pallokenttä, Helsinki, Finland	Finland	3–5	4–5	1933–36 Nordic Football Championship	
15	1 September 1935	Stockholm Olympic Stadium, Stockholm, Sweden	Romania	2–0	7–1	Friendly	
16	12 June 1938	Stade du Fort Carré, Antibes, France	Cuba	5–0	8–0	1938 FIFA World Cup	

== Honours ==
IK Sleipner

- Allsvenskan: 1937–1938

Sweden

- Summer Olympics bronze: 1924
