= Nils Axelsson =

Swedish footballer

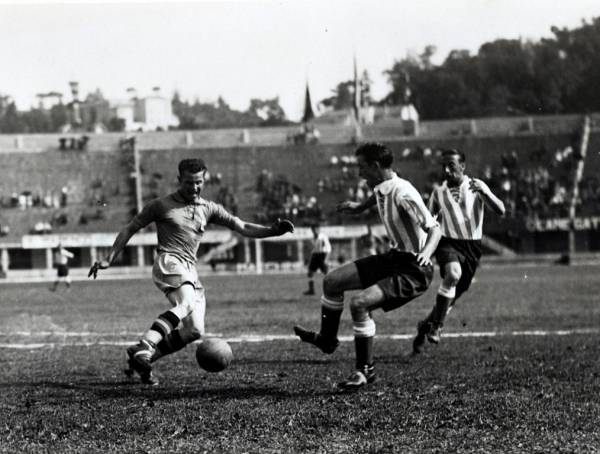
- Nils Axelsson (1934)

Personal information
- Date of birth: 18 January 1906
- Place of birth: Helsingborg, Sweden
- Date of death: 18 January 1989 (aged 83)
- Position: Defender

Senior career*
Years	Team	Apps	(Gls)
- Helsingborgs IF

International career
- Sweden
- * Club domestic league appearances and goals

Nils Axelsson (18 January 1906 – 18 January 1989) was a Swedish football defender who played for Sweden in the 1934 FIFA World Cup. He also played for Helsingborgs IF.
