= Nils Rosén (footballer) =

Swedish footballer

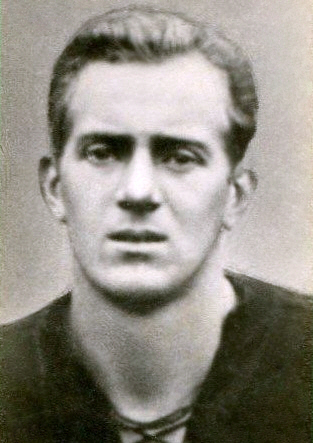

Personal information
- Date of birth: 22 May 1902
- Place of birth: Helsingborg, Sweden
- Date of death: 26 June 1951 (aged 49)
- Position: Midfielder

Senior career*
Years	Team	Apps	(Gls)
- Helsingborgs IF

International career
1925–1934	Sweden	25	(0)
- * Club domestic league appearances and goals

Nils Rosén (22 May 1902 – 26 June 1951) was a Swedish football midfielder who played for Sweden in the 1934 FIFA World Cup. He also played for Helsingborgs IF.
