= Reymersholms IK =

Swedish football club

- Full name: Reymersholms Idrottsklubb
- Nickname: Reymers
- Founded: 1899
- Ground: Zinkensdamms IP; Stockholm; Sweden
- Capacity: 6,500
- Chairman: Hans Förnestig
- Coach: Hannes Sahlin
- League: Division 3 Södra Svealand
- Website: http://www.reymers.se
| Home colours | Away colours |

Reymersholms IK is a sports club located in Stockholm and was founded on 1 September 1899. From the 1920s to the 1940s the club was successful in bandy, football and ice hockey. Today football is the only sport in the club. The club is affiliated to Stockholms Fotbollförbund which is a district organisation of the Swedish Football Association.

The men's team plays in Division 3 Södra Svealand which is the 5 tier of Swedish football. The women's team plays in the Women's Division 4.

The club's home matches are played at the home ground Zinkensdamms IP.

== History ==
The men's football team played one season at the highest national level in the Allsvenskan in 1941–42 and over the period 1924–25 until 1949–50 played 19 seasons in Division 2 which at that time was the second tier of Swedish football. The men's bandy team played nine seasons at the highest national level, the first season in 1935–36 and the last in 1947–48. The men's ice hockey team played in the top Swedish division in the 1930s and 1940s.

== Season to season ==
During their most successful period Reymersholms IK's men's team competed in the following divisions:

| Season | Level | Division | Section | Position | Movements |
|---|---|---|---|---|---|
| 1924–25 | Tier 2 | Division 2 | Östsvenska | 4th | |
| 1925–26 | Tier 2 | Division 2 | Östsvenska | 7th | |
| 1926–27 | Tier 2 | Division 2 | Östsvenska | 8th | |
| 1927–28 | Tier 2 | Division 2 | Östsvenska | 6th | Relegated |
| 1928–29 | Tier 3 | Division 3 | Östsvenska | 3rd | |
| 1929–30 | Tier 3 | Division 3 | Östsvenska | 2nd | |
| 1930–31 | Tier 3 | Division 3 | Östsvenska | 4th | |
| 1931–32 | Tier 3 | Division 3 | Östsvenska | 2nd | Promoted |
| 1932–33 | Tier 2 | Division 2 | Östra | 7th | |
| 1933–34 | Tier 2 | Division 2 | Östra | 10th | Relegated |
| 1934–35 | Tier 3 | Division 3 | Östsvenska | 2nd | |
| 1935–36 | Tier 3 | Division 3 | Östsvenska | 1st | Promoted |
| 1936–37 | Tier 2 | Division 2 | Östra | 5th | |
| 1937–38 | Tier 2 | Division 2 | Norra | 6th | |
| 1938–39 | Tier 2 | Division 2 | Norra | 5th | |
| 1939–40 | Tier 2 | Division 2 | Norra | 1st | Promotion Playoffs |
| 1940–41 | Tier 2 | Division 2 | Norra | 1st | Promotion Playoffs – Promoted |
| 1941–42 | Tier 1 | Allsvenskan | | 12th | Relegated |
| 1942–43 | Tier 2 | Division 2 | Norra | 5th | |
| 1943–44 | Tier 2 | Division 2 | Norra | 4th | |
| 1944–45 | Tier 2 | Division 2 | Norra | 3rd | |
| 1945–46 | Tier 2 | Division 2 | Östra | 6th | |
| 1946–47 | Tier 2 | Division 2 | Östra | 5th | |
| 1947–48 | Tier 2 | Division 2 | Nordöstra | 5th | |
| 1948–49 | Tier 2 | Division 2 | Nordöstra | 8th | |
| 1949–50 | Tier 2 | Division 2 | Nordöstra | 10th | Relegated |
| 1950–51 | Tier 3 | Division 3 | Östra | 10th | Relegated |
| 1951–52 | Tier 4 | Division 4 | ? | ? | |
| 1952–53 | Tier 4 | Division 4 | ? | ? | Promoted |
| 1953–54 | Tier 3 | Division 3 | Östra Svealand | 8th | Relegated |
| 1954–55 | Tier 4 | Division 4 | ? | 1st | Promoted |
| 1955–56 | Tier 3 | Division 3 | Östra Svealand | 9th | Relegated |
| 1956–57 | Tier 4 | Division 4 | Stockholm Södra | 6th | |
| 1957–58 | Tier 4 | Division 4 | Stockholm Södra | 9th | Relegated |
| 1959 | Tier 5 | Division 5 | ? | ? | |
| 1960 | Tier 5 | Division 5 | ? | 1st | Promoted |
| 1961 | Tier 4 | Division 4 | Stockholm Södra | 1st | Promoted |
| 1962 | Tier 3 | Division 3 | Östra Svealand | 9th | |
| 1963 | Tier 3 | Division 3 | Östra Svealand | 10th | Relegated |
| 1964 | Tier 4 | Division 4 | Stockholm Södra | 2nd | |
| 1965 | Tier 4 | Division 4 | Stockholm Södra | 2nd | |
| 1966 | Tier 4 | Division 4 | Stockholm Södra | 1st | Promoted |
| 1967 | Tier 3 | Division 3 | Östra Svealand | 10th | Relegated |
| 1968 | Tier 4 | Division 4 | Stockholm Södra | 2nd | |
| 1969 | Tier 4 | Division 4 | Stockholm Södra | 4th | |
| 1970 | Tier 4 | Division 4 | Stockholm Södra | 3rd | |
| 1971 | Tier 4 | Division 4 | Stockholm Södra | 3rd | |
| 1972 | Tier 4 | Division 4 | Stockholm Norra | 2nd | |
| 1973 | Tier 4 | Division 4 | Stockholm Norra | 4th | |
| 1974 | Tier 4 | Division 4 | Stockholm Södra | 6th | |
| 1975 | Tier 4 | Division 4 | Stockholm Södra | 1st | |
| 1976 | Tier 3 | Division 3 | Östra Svealand | 9th | |
| 1977 | Tier 3 | Division 3 | Östra Svealand | 5th | |
| 1978 | Tier 3 | Division 3 | Östra Svealand | 9th | |
| 1979 | Tier 3 | Division 3 | Östra Svealand | 7th | |
| 1980 | Tier 3 | Division 3 | Östra Svealand | 4th | |
| 1981 | Tier 3 | Division 3 | Östra Svealand | 2nd | |
| 1982 | Tier 3 | Division 3 | Östra Svealand | 9th | |
| 1983 | Tier 3 | Division 3 | Östra Svealand | 11th | Relegated |
| 1984 | Tier 4 | Division 4 | Stockholm Norra | 3rd | |
| 1985 | Tier 4 | Division 4 | Stockholm Norra | 8th | |

In recent seasons Reymersholms IK have competed in the following divisions:

| Season | Level | Division | Section | Position | Movements |
|---|---|---|---|---|---|
| 1998 | Tier 4 | Division 4 | Stockholm Mellersta | 6th | |
| 1999 | Tier 4 | Division 4 | Stockholm Mellersta | 8th | |
| 2000 | Tier 5 | Division 4 | Stockholm Mellersta | 9th | |
| 2001 | Tier 5 | Division 4 | Stockholm Mellersta | 2nd | |
| 2002 | Tier 5 | Division 4 | Stockholm Mellersta | 4th | |
| 2003 | Tier 5 | Division 4 | Stockholm Mellersta | 8th | |
| 2004 | Tier 5 | Division 4 | Stockholm Mellersta | 1st | Promoted |
| 2005 | Tier 4 | Division 3 | Östra Svealand | 7th | |
| 2006* | Tier 5 | Division 3 | Östra Svealand | 11th | Relegated |
| 2007 | Tier 6 | Division 4 | Stockholm Mellersta | 3rd | |
| 2008 | Tier 6 | Division 4 | Stockholm Mellersta | 4th | |
| 2009 | Tier 6 | Division 4 | Stockholm Mellersta | 6th | |
| 2010 | Tier 6 | Division 4 | Stockholm Mellersta | 9th | |
| 2011 | Tier 6 | Division 4 | Stockholm Mellersta | 7th | |
| 2012 | Tier 6 | Division 4 | Stockholm Mellersta | 5th | |
| 2013 | Tier 6 | Division 4 | Stockholm Mellersta | 12th | Relegated |
| 2014 | Tier 7 | Division 5 | Stockholm Mellersta | 7th | |
| 2015 | Tier 7 | Division 5 | Stockholm Mellersta | 2nd | Promoted |
| 2016 | Tier 6 | Division 4 | Stockholm Mellersta | 9th | |
| 2017 | Tier 6 | Division 4 | Stockholm Mellersta | 3rd | |
| 2018 | Tier 6 | Division 4 | Stockholm Mellersta | 3rd | |
| 2019 | Tier 6 | Division 4 | Stockholm Mellersta | 3rd | |
| 2020 | Tier 6 | Division 4 | Stockholm Mellersta | 1st | Promoted |
| 2021 | Tier 5 | Division 3 | Södra Svealand | 9th | |

* League restructuring in 2006 resulted in a new division being created at Tier 3 and subsequent divisions dropping a level.

== Attendances ==
In recent seasons Reymersholms IK have had the following average attendances:

| Season | Average attendance | Division / Section | Level |
|---|---|---|---|
| 2013 | 47 | Div 4 Stockholm Mellersta | Tier 6 |
| 2014 | 43 | Div 5 Stockholm Mellersta | Tier 7 |
| 2015 | 42 | Div 5 Stockholm Mellersta | Tier 7 |
| 2016 | 50 | Div 4 Stockholm Mellersta | Tier 6 |
| 2017 | 38 | Div 4 Stockholm Mellersta | Tier 6 |
| 2018 | Not Available | Div 4 Stockholm Mellersta | Tier 6 |
| 2019 | ? | Div 4 Stockholm Mellersta | Tier 6 |
| 2020 | ? | Div 4 Stockholm Mellersta | Tier 6 |
| 2021 | | Div 3 Södra Svealand | Tier 6 |

* Attendances are provided in the Publikliga sections of the Svenska Fotbollförbundet website.
