= Anders Rydberg =

Swedish footballer

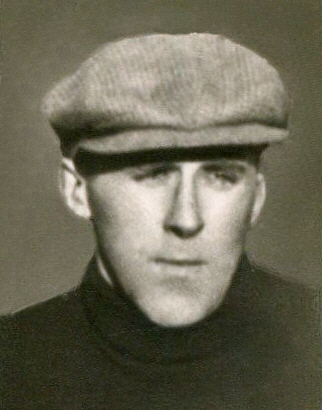
- Swedish footballer Anders Rydberg, IFK Göteborg (c.1935)

Personal information
- Date of birth: 3 March 1903
- Place of birth: Sweden
- Date of death: 26 October 1989 (aged 86)
- Position: Goalkeeper

Senior career*
Years	Team	Apps	(Gls)
- IFK Göteborg

International career
- Sweden
- * Club domestic league appearances and goals

Anders Rydberg (3 March 1903 – 26 October 1989) was a Swedish football goalkeeper who played for IFK Göteborg. He represented Team Sweden in the 1934 FIFA World Cup in Italy.
