= Erik Persson (footballer) =

Swedish footballer (1909–1989)

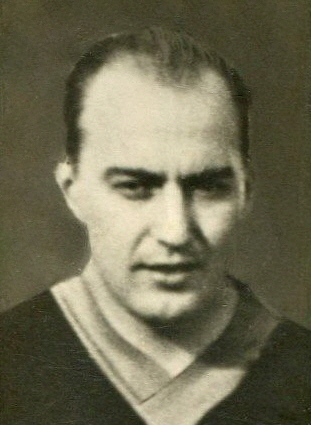
- Erik Lillis Persson in the mid 1930s

Personal information
- Date of birth: 19 November 1909
- Place of birth: Sweden
- Date of death: 1 February 1989 (aged 79)
- Position: Forward

Senior career*
Years	Team	Apps	(Gls)
- AIK

International career
1930–1939	Sweden	32	(20)
- * Club domestic league appearances and goals

Erik "Lillis" Persson (19 November 1909 – 1 February 1989) was a Swedish football forward who played for AIK. He also played for Team Sweden at the 1936 Summer Olympics, and at the 1938 FIFA World Cup in France.

His brother was boxer Harry Persson.
