= Gårda BK =

Swedish football club

- Full name: Gårda Bollklubb
- Founded: 1919
- Ground: Överåsvallen, Gothenburg; Sweden
- Chairman: Anthon Näsström
- Manager: Marcus Pettersson
- League: Division 4 season = 2021
- Division 4 Göteborg A, 3rd
Home colours	Away colours

Gårda BK is a Swedish football club located in Gothenburg. The club, formed 1 November 1919, currently plays in a local league. The club has played eight seasons in the highest Swedish league, Allsvenskan. Gårda BK are affiliated to the Göteborgs Fotbollförbund.

== Achievements ==
- Allsvenskan:
  - Best placement (5th): 1937–38, 1938–39

== Season to season ==
In their early history Gårda BK competed in the following divisions:

Season	Level	Division	Section	Position	Movements
1931–32	Tier 3	Division 3	Västsvenska	10th	
1932–33	Tier 3	Division 3	Västsvenska	1st	Promoted
1933–34	Tier 2	Division 2	Västra	3rd	
1934–35	Tier 2	Division 2	Västra	1st	Promotion Playoffs – Promoted
1935–36	Tier 1	Allsvenskan		6th	
1936–37	Tier 1	Allsvenskan		10th	
1937–38	Tier 1	Allsvenskan		5th	
1938–39	Tier 1	Allsvenskan		5th	
1939–40	Tier 1	Allsvenskan		9th	
1940–41	Tier 1	Allsvenskan		9th	
1941–42	Tier 1	Allsvenskan		8th	
1942–43	Tier 1	Allsvenskan		11th	Relegated
1943–44	Tier 2	Division 2	Västra	5th	
1944–45	Tier 2	Division 2	Västra	6th	
1945–46	Tier 2	Division 2	Västra	10th	Relegated
1946–47	Tier 3	Division 3	Västsvenska Södra	9th	Relegated

In recent seasons Gårda BK have competed in the following divisions:

Season	Level	Division	Section	Position	Movements
1994	Tier 7	Division 6	Göteborg B	4th	
1995	Tier 7	Division 6	Göteborg B	2nd	
1996	Tier 7	Division 6	Göteborg B	2nd	
1997	Tier 7	Division 6	Göteborg B	4th	
1998	Tier 7	Division 6	Göteborg B	3rd	
1999	Tier 7	Division 6	Göteborg B	10th	
2000	Tier 7	Division 6	Göteborg B	6th	
2001	Tier 7	Division 6	Göteborg B	9th	
2002	Tier 7	Division 6	Göteborg B	1st	Promoted
2003	Tier 6	Division 5	Göteborg B	12th	Relegated
2004	Tier 7	Division 6	Göteborg C	1st	Promoted
2005	Tier 6	Division 5	Göteborg A	4th	
2006*	Tier 7	Division 5	Göteborg A	10th	
2007	Tier 7	Division 5	Göteborg A	9th	
2008	Tier 7	Division 5	Göteborg A	12th	Relegated
2009	Tier 8	Division 6	Göteborg A	5th	
2010	Tier 8	Division 6	Göteborg A	4th	
2011	Tier 8	Division 6	Göteborg A	7th	
2012	Tier 8	Division 6	Göteborg A	5th	
2013	Tier 8	Division 6	Göteborg A	6th	
2014	Tier 8	Division 6	Göteborg A	1st	Promoted
2015	Tier 7	Division 5	Göteborg A	3rd	Promoted
2016	Tier 6	Division 4	Göteborg A	5th	
2017	Tier 6	Division 4	Göteborg A	4th	
2018	Tier 6	Division 4	Göteborg A	1st	Promoted
2019	Tier 5	Division 3	Nordvästra Götaland	10th	Relegated
2020	Tier 6	Division 4	Göteborg A	9th	
2021	Tier 6	Division 4	Göteborg A	3rd	

* League restructuring in 2006 resulted in a new division being created at Tier 3 and subsequent divisions dropping a level.

== Attendances ==
In recent seasons Gårda BK have had the following average attendances:

Season	Average attendance	Division / Section	Level
2015	48	Div 5 Göteborg A	Tier 7
2016	45	Div 4 Göteborg A	Tier 6
2017	64	Div 4 Göteborg A	Tier 6
2018	57	Div 4 Göteborg A	Tier 6
2019		Div 3 Nordvästra Götaland	Tier 5
2020		Div 4 Göteborg A	Tier 6

* Attendances are provided in the Publikliga sections of the Svenska Fotbollförbundet website.

== Records ==
- Highest attendance, Gamla Ullevi: 26,178 vs. IK Brage, 31 October 1937
