= List of Allsvenskan teams =

The following is a list of clubs who have played in Allsvenskan at any time since its formation in 1924–25 to the current season. Allsvenskan teams playing in the 2017 Allsvenskan season are indicated in bold. If the longest spell is the current spell, this is indicated in bold. A total of 63 teams have played in Allsvenskan.

All statistics here refer to time in the Allsvenskan only, with the exception of 'Last promotion' which refers to the club's last promotion from the second tier of Swedish football.

Club	Total Seasons	Total Spells	Longest Spell	Last Promotion	Last Relegation	Years Absent	Seasons	Highest Finish
**AFC Eskilstuna**	1	1	1	2016	In Allsvenskan	0	2017–	NA
**AIK**	88	5	27	2005	In Allsvenskan	0	1924–1951, 1952–1961, 1963–1979, 1981–2004, 2006–	1st
Assyriska	1	1	1	2004	2005	12	2005	14th (relegated)
Åtvidaberg	20	4	9	2009	2015	2	1951–52, 1968–1976, 1978–82, 2010–2015	1st
Billingsfors	1	1	1	1945–46	1946–47	70	1946–47	12th (relegated)
Brage	18	5	11	1992	1993	24	1937–1941, 1943–44, 1966, 1980–1990, 1993	4th
Brommapojkarna	5	3	2	2012	2014	3	2007, 2009–2010, 2013–2014	12th
Brynäs	1	1	1	1973	1974	43	1974	14th (relegated)
City	1	1	1	1924–25	1925–26	91	1925–26	12th (relegated)
Degerfors	29	4	16	1991	1997	20	1938–39, 1940–1956, 1960–1966, 1992–1997	2nd
Derby	1	1	1	1976	1977	40	1977	14th (relegated)
**Djurgården**	62	9	20	2000	In Allsvenskan	0	1927–28, 1936–37, 1945–1948, 1949–1960, 1962–1981, 1986, 1988–1992, 1999, 2001–	1st
**Elfsborg**	72	5	28	1996	In Allsvenskan	0	1926–1954, 1961–1971, 1973–1984, 1986–1987, 1997–	1st
Enköping	1	1	1	2002	2003	14	2003	14th (relegated)
Eskilstuna	14	7	6	1963	1964	53	1924–1929, 1930–1936, 1942–43, 1957–58, 1964	5th
Falkenberg	3	1	3	2013	2016	1	2014–2016	13th
GAIS	54	9	14	2005	2012	5	1924–1938, 1941–1955, 1956–1959, 1964, 1966–1970, 1972–1975, 1988–1992, 2000, 2006–2012	1st
Gårda	8	1	8	1934–35	1942–43	74	1935–1943	5th
Gefle	16	3	12	2004	2016	1	1933–1935, 1983–1984, 2005–2016	9th
**IFK Göteborg**	84	4	**40**	1976	In Allsvenskan	0	1924–1938, 1939–1950, 1951–1970, 1977–	1st
**Häcken**	15	6	**9**	2008	In Allsvenskan	0	1983, 1993–1994, 1998, 2000–2001, 2005–2006, 2009–	2nd
Hallstahammar	2	2	1	1937–38	1938–39	78	1931–32, 1938–39	12th (relegated)
Halmia	11	4	7	1978	1979	38	1932–1934, 1943–50, 1963, 1979	7th
**Halmstad**	54	10	19	2016	In Allsvenskan	0	1933–1936, 1942–1946, 1947–48, 1954–1959, 1972, 1974–1987, 1989–1991, 1993–2011, 2013–2015, 2017–	1st
**Hammarby**	48	11	19	2014	In Allsvenskan	0	1924–25, 1939–40, 1954–1957, 1959–1963, 1965, 1967, 1970–1988, 1990, 1994–1995, 1998–2009, 2015–	1st
Helsingborg	64	3	31	1992	2016	1	1924–1935, 1937–1968, 1992–2016	1st
Högadal	1	1	1	1961	1962	55	1962	12th (relegated)
Holmsund	1	1	1	1966	1967	50	1967	12th (relegated)
**Jönköpings Södra**	11	4	10	2015	In Allsvenskan	0	1945–46, 1947–1954, 1960, 2016–	2nd
**Kalmar**	30	7	**14**	2003	In Allsvenskan	0	1949–1951, 1953–1955, 1976–1982, 1984–1986, 1999, 2002, 2004–	1st
Landskrona	34	7	10	2001	2005	12	1924–1933, 1934–1942, 1944–45, 1948–49, 1971–1980, 1994, 2002–2005	2nd
Ljungskile	2	2	1	2007	2008	9	1997, 2008	14th (relegated)
Ludvika	1	1	1	1943–44	1944–45	72	1944–45	11th (relegated)
Luleå	1	1	1	1970	1971	46	1971	12th (relegated)
**Malmö FF**	81	3	63	2000	In Allsvenskan	0	1931–1934, 1936–1999, 2001–	1st
IFK Malmö	13	4	6	1955–56	1962	55	1924–1926, 1928–1932, 1952–53, 1956–1962	2nd
Mjällby	8	4	5	2009	2014	3	1980, 1983, 1985, 2010–2014	6th
Motala	1	1	1	1956–57	1957–58	59	1957–58	12th (relegated)
Norrby	1	1	1	1954–55	1955–56	61	1955–56	11th (relegated)
**Norrköping**	77	5	42	2010	In Allsvenskan	0	1924–1930, 1935–1937, 1940–1982, 1984–2002, 2008, 2011–	1st
Oddevold	1	1	1	1995	1996	21	1996	14th (relegated)
**Örebro**	45	6	18	2013	In Allsvenskan	0	1946–47, 1948–49, 1950–1953, 1961–1978, 1989–2004, 2007–2012, 2014–	2nd
Örgryte	56	8	16	2008	2009	8	1924–1940, 1959–1968, 1970–1973, 1975–1976, 1981–1990, 1993, 1995–2006, 2009	1st
Öster	33	5	21	2012	2013	4	1968–1988, 1990–1998, 2003, 2006, 2013	1st
**Östersund**	2	1	2	2015	In Allsvenskan	0	2016–	8th
Råå	2	1	2	1949–50	1951–52	65	1950–1952	2nd
Redbergslid	1	1	1	1929–30	1930–31	86	1930–31	11th (relegated)
Reymersholm	1	1	1	1940–41	1941–42	75	1941–42	12th (relegated)
Saab	1	1	1	1972	1973	43	1973	14th (relegated)
Sandvikens AIK	1	1	1	1953–54	1954–55	62	1954–55	12th (relegated)
Sandvikens IF	21	4	12	1954–55	1961	56	1929–1931, 1932–1944, 1953–54, 1955–1961	3rd
**Sirius**	4	3	2	2016	In Allsvenskan	0	1969, 1973–1974, 2017–	12th
Sleipner	16	2	9	1934–35	1940–41	76	1924–1933, 1934–1941	1st
Stattena	2	2	1	1926–27	1929–30	87	1927–28, 1929–30	12th (relegated)
**GIF Sundsvall**	17	6	6	2014	In Allsvenskan	0	1965, 1975, 1987–1989, 1991, 2000–2005, 2008, 2012, 2015–	5th
IFK Sundsvall	5	2	3	1978	1981	36	1976–1977, 1979–1981	7th
Trelleborg	17	4	10	2006	2011	6	1985, 1992–2001, 2004, 2007–2011	3rd
Uddevalla	2	1	2	1924–25	1926–27	90	1925–1927	10th
Umeå	1	1	1	1995	1996	21	1996	11th (relegated)
Västerås IK	1	1	1	1923–24	1924–25	92	1924–25	11th (relegated)
Västerås SK	4	3	2	1996	1997	20	1955–1957, 1978, 1997	10th
Västra Frölunda	10	3	4	1997	2000	17	1987–1989, 1992–1995, 1998–2000	5th
Westermalm	2	2	1	1927–28	1928–29	88	1926–27, 1928–29	11th (relegated)
