= 1927–28 Division 2 (Swedish football) =

Swedish League Division 2
- Season: 1927–28
- Champions: Sandvikens IF; Hallstahammars SK; Westermalms IF; Redbergslids IK; IFK Malmö
- Promoted: Westermalms IF; IFK Malmö

Statistics of Division 2 for the 1927–28 season.

== League standings ==
=== Division 2 Uppsvenska Serien 1927–28 ===
Teams from a large part of northern Sweden, approximately above the province of Medelpad, were not allowed to play in the national league system until the 1953–54 season, and a championship was instead played to decide the best team in Norrland.

Pos	Team	Pld	W	D	L	GF	GA	GD	Pts	Qualification or relegation
1	Sandvikens IF	16	14	2	0	74	18	+56	30	League transfer within league level
2	Gefle IF	16	9	3	4	51	35	+16	21	League transfer within league level
3	Sandvikens AIK	16	9	2	5	61	39	+22	20	Relegated to Division 3
4	Söderhamns Skärgårds IF	16	7	4	5	50	48	+2	18	Relegated to Division 3
5	IK Brage	16	6	4	6	44	50	−6	16	Relegated to Division 3
6	Brynäs IF	16	6	2	8	40	42	−2	14	Relegated to Division 3
7	IK Sirius	16	4	2	10	32	69	−37	10	Relegated to Division 3
8	Kvarnsvedens GIF	16	3	2	11	26	55	−29	8	Relegated to Division 3
9	Skutskärs IF	16	3	1	12	24	46	−22	7	Relegated to Division 3

No teams from Uppsvenska Serien were allowed to be promoted to Allsvenskan, due to both geographic and economic reasons.

=== Division 2 Mellansvenska Serien 1927–28 ===
Pos	Team	Pld	W	D	L	GF	GA	GD	Pts	Qualification or relegation
1	Hallstahammars SK	18	11	5	2	50	23	+27	27	Playoffs for promotion to Allsvenskan
2	IFK Västerås	18	10	5	3	59	29	+30	25	League transfer within league level
3	IK City	18	10	3	5	38	26	+12	23	League transfer within league level
4	Surahammars IF	18	7	4	7	39	33	+6	18 (Note: Tie breaker is goal average.)	League transfer within league level
5	Örebro SK	18	7	4	7	30	38	−8	18	Relegated to Division 3
6	Katrineholms AIK	18	7	3	8	37	49	−12	17	Relegated to Division 3
7	Köpings IS	18	4	7	7	18	27	−9	15	Relegated to Division 3
8	Katrineholms SK	18	4	6	8	28	35	−7	14	Relegated to Division 3
9	Västerås IK	18	6	1	11	27	42	−15	13	Relegated to Division 3
10	IFK Arboga	18	3	4	11	27	51	−24	10	Relegated to Division 3

=== Division 2 Östsvenska Serien 1927–28 ===
Pos	Team	Pld	W	D	L	GF	GA	GD	Pts	Qualification or relegation
1	Westermalms IF	16	12	2	2	49	18	+31	26	Playoffs for promotion to Allsvenskan
2	Sundbybergs IK	16	9	5	2	38	23	+15	23	League transfer within league level
3	Hammarby IF	16	9	4	3	34	25	+9	22	League transfer within league level
4	IFK Stockholm	16	6	4	6	44	40	+4	16	League transfer within league level
5	BK Derby	16	5	4	7	30	31	−1	14	Relegated to Division 3
6	Reymersholms IK	16	6	1	9	34	41	−7	13	Relegated to Division 3
7	IF Linnéa	16	5	2	9	27	35	−8	12 (Note: Tie breaker is goal average.)	Relegated to Division 3
8	Huvudsta IS	16	5	2	9	18	34	−16	12	Relegated to Division 3
9	IF Vesta	16	3	0	13	22	49	−27	6	Relegated to Division 3

=== Division 2 Västsvenska Serien 1927–28 ===
Pos	Team	Pld	W	D	L	GF	GA	GD	Pts	Qualification or relegation
1	Redbergslids IK	22	18	0	4	77	30	+47	36	Playoffs for promotion to Allsvenskan
2	IFK Uddevalla	22	13	4	5	54	33	+21	30	League transfer within league level
3	Jonsereds IF	22	13	3	6	64	36	+28	29	League transfer within league level
4	Fässbergs IF	22	12	3	7	54	35	+19	27	League transfer within league level
5	Krokslätts FF	22	11	3	8	58	47	+11	25	League transfer within league level
6	Skara IF	22	10	3	9	37	39	−2	23	Relegated to Division 3
7	Majornas IK	22	9	2	11	54	42	+12	20	Relegated to Division 3
8	IF Heimer	22	8	3	11	48	52	−4	19	Relegated to Division 3
9	Uddevalla IS	22	7	3	12	33	51	−18	17	Relegated to Division 3
10	Trollhättans IF	22	7	0	15	42	64	−22	14	Relegated to Division 3
11	IFK Borås	22	3	6	13	31	65	−34	12 (Note: Tie breaker is goal average.)	Relegated to Division 3
12	IFK Åmål	22	4	4	14	31	86	−55	12	Relegated to Division 3

=== Division 2 Sydsvenska Serien 1927–28 ===
Pos	Team	Pld	W	D	L	GF	GA	GD	Pts	Qualification or relegation
1	IFK Malmö	20	16	4	0	66	16	+50	36	Playoffs for promotion to Allsvenskan
2	Kalmar FF	20	12	2	6	57	37	+20	26 (Note: Tie breaker is goal average.)	League transfer within league level
3	Malmö FF	20	11	4	5	63	44	+19	26	League transfer within league level
4	Halmstads BK	20	9	4	7	47	37	+10	22	League transfer within league level
5	IS Halmia	20	8	2	10	36	47	−11	18	League transfer within league level
6	Varbergs BoIS	20	7	3	10	36	51	−15	17	Relegated to Division 3
7	Varbergs GIF	20	7	3	10	33	58	−25	17	Relegated to Division 3
8	Malmö BI	20	7	2	11	40	48	−8	16	Relegated to Division 3
9	IFK Helsingborg	20	7	1	12	48	56	−8	15	Relegated to Division 3
10	IFK Kristianstad	20	6	3	11	44	58	−14	15	Relegated to Division 3
11	Landskrona IF	20	4	4	12	37	55	−18	12	Relegated to Division 3
