= 1925–26 Division 2 (Swedish football) =

Swedish League Division 2
- Season: 1925–26
- Champions: Sandvikens IF; Örebro SK; Westermalms IF; IF Elfsborg; Halmstads BK
- Promoted: Westermalms IF; IF Elfsborg
- Relegated: Domnarvets GIF; Falu IF; Örebro IK; IFK Örebro; Tranebergs IF; Falkenbergs GIK

Statistics of Division 2 for the 1925–26 season.

== League standings ==
=== Division 2 Uppsvenska Serien 1925–26 ===
Teams from a large part of northern Sweden, approximately above the province of Medelpad, were not allowed to play in the national league system until the 1953–54 season, and a championship was instead played to decide the best team in Norrland.

Pos	Team	Pld	W	D	L	GF	GA	GD	Pts	Qualification or relegation
1	Sandvikens IF	14	12	1	1	60	16	+44	25	
2	Gefle IF	14	8	2	4	50	29	+21	18 (Note: Tie breaker is goal average.)	
3	Brynäs IF	14	7	4	3	52	34	+18	18	
4	Skutskärs IF	14	8	1	5	51	32	+19	17	
5	Sandvikens AIK	14	7	2	5	36	25	+11	16	
6	Kvarnsvedens IF	14	2	3	9	24	51	−27	7	
7	Domnarvets GIF	14	3	1	10	19	56	−37	7	Relegated to Division 3
8	Falu IK	14	2	0	12	19	68	−49	4	Relegated to Division 3

Notes:

No teams from Uppsvenska Serien were allowed to be promoted to Allsvenskan, due to both geographic and economic reasons.

=== Division 2 Mellansvenska Serien 1925–26 ===
Pos	Team	Pld	W	D	L	GF	GA	GD	Pts	Qualification or relegation
1	Örebro SK	18	11	3	4	42	39	+3	25	Playoffs for promotion to Allsvenskan
2	Hallstahammars SK	18	9	3	6	42	31	+11	21	
3	Västerås IK	18	9	2	7	42	32	+10	20 (Note: Tie breaker is goal average.)	
4	IFK Västerås	18	9	2	7	49	43	+6	20	
5	Köpings IS	18	7	5	6	37	29	+8	19	
6	Västerås SK	18	9	1	8	39	33	+6	19	
7	Katrineholms AIK	18	7	5	6	34	30	+4	19	
8	Katrineholms SK	19	8	3	8	30	30	0	19	
9	Örebro IK	18	4	4	10	34	49	−15	12	Relegated to Division 3
10	IFK Örebro	18	2	2	14	29	59	−30	6	Relegated to Division 3

=== Division 2 Östsvenska Serien 1925–26 ===
Pos	Team	Pld	W	D	L	GF	GA	GD	Pts	Qualification or relegation
1	Westermalms IF	20	15	3	2	71	17	+54	33	Playoffs for promotion to Allsvenskan
2	Sundbybergs IK	20	13	3	4	53	29	+24	29	
3	Djurgårdens IF	20	11	5	4	60	28	+32	27	
4	IF Linnéa	20	10	3	7	43	45	−2	23	
5	IFK Stockholm	20	8	5	7	41	44	−3	21	
6	Hammarby IF	20	9	2	9	39	28	+11	20	
7	Reymersholms IK	20	7	4	9	30	32	−2	18	
8	Mariebergs IK	20	5	7	8	40	45	−5	17	
9	Stockholms BK	20	6	2	12	30	52	−22	14	
10	IK Sirius	20	5	2	13	38	65	−27	12	Relegated to Division 3
11	Tranebergs IF	20	2	2	16	14	74	−60	6	Relegated to Division 3

=== Division 2 Västsvenska Serien 1925–26 ===
Pos	Team	Pld	W	D	L	GF	GA	GD	Pts	Qualification or relegation
1	IF Elfsborg	16	10	1	5	54	25	+29	21 (Note: Tie breaker is goal average.)	Playoffs for promotion to Allsvenskan
2	Vänersborgs IF	16	9	3	4	32	30	+2	21	
3	Jonsereds IF	16	7	4	5	30	26	+4	18	
4	Fässbergs IF	16	7	2	7	36	31	+5	16	
5	Krokslätts FF	16	5	6	5	26	26	0	16	
6	Skara IF	16	6	3	7	27	33	−6	15	
7	Trollhättans IF	16	6	2	8	28	36	−8	14	
8	Uddevalla IS	16	5	2	9	26	38	−12	12	Relegated to Division 3
9	IF Heimer	16	5	1	10	35	48	−13	11	Relegated to Division 3

=== Division 2 Sydsvenska Serien 1925–26 ===
Pos	Team	Pld	W	D	L	GF	GA	GD	Pts	Qualification or relegation
1	Halmstads BK	16	8	6	2	35	19	+16	22	Playoffs for promotion to Allsvenskan
2	Stattena IF	16	7	5	4	25	20	+5	19	
3	Malmö FF	16	5	8	3	44	24	+20	18 (Note: Tie breaker is goal average.)	
4	Malmö BI	16	7	4	5	37	23	+14	18	
5	IFK Helsingborg	16	8	2	6	32	22	+10	18	
6	IS Halmia	16	7	2	7	28	23	+5	16	
7	Lunds BK	16	6	3	7	24	31	−7	15	
8	Varbergs GIF	16	4	4	8	18	30	−12	12	Relegated to Division 3
9	Falkenbergs GIK	16	2	2	12	11	62	−51	6	Relegated to Division 3
