= 1956–57 Division 2 (Swedish football) =

Swedish League Division 2
- Season: 1956–57
- Champions: GIF Sundsvall; IFK Eskilstuna; Örgryte IS; Motala AIF
- Promoted: IFK Eskilstuna; Motala AIF
- Relegated: IF Friska Viljor; Fagerviks GF; Ljusne AIK; IK City; Avesta AIK; Karlstads BIK; Fässbergs IF; Skara IF; IFK Trollhättan; Nybro IF; BK Kenty; Gunnarstorps IF

The 1956–57 season of Swedish football Division 2 included Statistical summaries of league performance during that period.

== League standings ==
=== Norrland ===
Pos	Team	Pld	W	D	L	GF	GA	GD	Pts	Qualification or relegation
1	GIF Sundsvall	18	12	2	4	51	30	+21	26	Playoffs for promotion to Allsvenskan
2	Skellefteå AIK	18	12	2	4	45	27	+18	26	
3	IFK Holmsund	18	10	5	3	50	30	+20	25	
4	Bodens BK	18	11	3	4	42	23	+19	25	
5	Lycksele IF	18	10	1	7	48	32	+16	21	
6	IFK Luleå	18	6	3	9	29	41	−12	15	
7	Gefle IF	18	6	0	12	32	43	−11	12	
8	IF Friska Viljor	18	5	1	12	27	56	−29	11	Relegated to Division 3
9	Fagerviks GF	18	4	2	12	30	45	−15	10	Relegated to Division 3
10	Ljusne AIK	18	3	3	12	23	50	−27	9	Relegated to Division 3

=== Svealand ===
Pos	Team	Pld	W	D	L	GF	GA	GD	Pts	Qualification or relegation
1	IFK Eskilstuna	22	15	3	4	45	20	+25	33	Playoffs for promotion to Allsvenskan
2	Örebro SK	22	13	4	5	52	26	+26	30	
3	IFK Stockholm	22	12	5	5	49	30	+19	29	
4	Degerfors IF	22	9	7	6	40	27	+13	25	
5	IK Brage	22	9	6	7	39	41	−2	24	
6	Köpings IS	22	8	6	8	45	40	+5	22	
7	Katrineholms SK	22	9	3	10	51	51	0	21	
8	IFK Bofors	22	7	5	10	36	40	−4	19	
9	Surahammars IF	22	8	2	12	35	47	−12	18	
10	IK City	22	6	5	11	20	37	−17	17	Relegated to Division 3
11	Avesta AIK	22	5	6	11	37	50	−13	16	Relegated to Division 3
12	Karlstads BIK	22	4	2	16	28	68	−40	10	Relegated to Division 3

=== Östra Götaland ===
Pos	Team	Pld	W	D	L	GF	GA	GD	Pts	Qualification or relegation
1	Motala AIF	22	13	6	3	48	27	+21	32	Playoffs for promotion to Allsvenskan
2	Landskrona BoIS	22	14	3	5	56	29	+27	31	
3	BK Derby	22	13	5	4	48	26	+22	31	
4	Höganäs BK	22	13	3	6	51	30	+21	29	
5	IK Sleipner	22	10	9	3	51	33	+18	29	
6	IFK Kristianstad	22	9	6	7	56	44	+12	24	
7	Åtvidabergs FF	22	7	5	10	32	39	−7	19	
8	Råå IF	22	6	6	10	33	35	−2	18	
9	Kalmar FF	22	8	0	14	34	53	−19	16	
10	Nybro IF	22	6	3	13	35	61	−26	15	Relegated to Division 3
11	BK Kenty	22	6	1	15	37	59	−22	13	Relegated to Division 3
12	Gunnarstorps IF	22	3	1	18	33	78	−45	7	Relegated to Division 3

=== Västra Götaland ===
Pos	Team	Pld	W	D	L	GF	GA	GD	Pts	Qualification or relegation
1	Örgryte IS	22	17	2	3	72	26	+46	36	Playoffs for promotion to Allsvenskan
2	IF Elfsborg	22	15	4	3	52	24	+28	34	
3	Waggeryds IK	22	13	3	6	51	33	+18	29	
4	Norrby IF	22	11	4	7	47	34	+13	26	
5	Jönköpings Södra IF	22	12	1	9	44	32	+12	25	
6	IS Halmia	22	9	5	8	41	44	−3	23	
7	Husqvarna IF	22	7	4	11	45	39	+6	18	
8	IK Oddevold	22	6	6	10	43	39	+4	18	
9	Kinna IF	22	7	3	12	32	48	−16	17	
10	Fässbergs IF	22	6	3	13	26	58	−32	15	Relegated to Division 3
11	Skara IF	22	6	3	13	24	67	−43	15	Relegated to Division 3
12	IFK Trollhättan	22	3	2	17	25	58	−33	8	Relegated to Division 3

== Allsvenskan promotion playoffs ==
- GIF Sundsvall - IFK Eskilstuna 3-6 (1-1, 2-2, 0-3)
- Örgryte IS - Motala AIF 3-8 (3-4, 0-4)

IFK Eskilstuna and Motala AIF promoted to Allsvenskan.
