= 1960 Division 2 (Swedish football) =

Swedish League Division 2
- Season: 1960
- Champions: IFK Luleå; Örebro SK; IF Elfsborg; IFK Kristianstad
- Promoted: Örebro SK; IF Elfsborg
- Relegated: Wifsta/Östrands IF; Marma IF; IF Älgarna; IFK Kumla; Malungs IF; Södertälje SK; Waggeryds IK; Tidaholms GIF; Trollhättans IF; Höganäs BK; IK Sleipner; Perstorps SK

Statistics of Swedish football Division 2 for the 1960 season.

== League standings ==
=== Norrland ===
Pos	Team	Pld	W	D	L	GF	GA	GD	Pts	Qualification or relegation
1	IFK Luleå	18	13	2	3	47	16	+31	28	Playoffs for promotion to Allsvenskan
2	IFK Holmsund	18	12	2	4	45	17	+28	26	
3	Skellefteå AIK	18	10	2	6	44	32	+12	22	
4	IFK Östersund	18	9	3	6	43	30	+13	21	
5	Bodens BK	18	9	3	6	33	28	+5	21	
6	IF Friska Viljor	18	6	5	7	41	36	+5	17	
7	Lycksele IF	18	6	3	9	13	28	−15	15	
8	Wifsta/Östrands IF	18	4	3	11	24	44	−20	11	Relegation to Division 3
9	Marma IF	18	4	2	12	22	55	−33	10	Relegation to Division 3
10	IF Älgarna	18	4	1	13	27	53	−26	9	Relegation to Division 3

=== Svealand ===
Pos	Team	Pld	W	D	L	GF	GA	GD	Pts	Qualification or relegation
1	Örebro SK	22	19	3	0	72	16	+56	41	Playoffs for promotion to Allsvenskan
2	SK Sifhälla	22	14	2	6	57	31	+26	30	
3	Karlstads BIK	22	13	3	6	74	45	+29	29	
4	Avesta AIK	22	11	4	7	54	38	+16	26	
5	IFK Eskilstuna	22	11	3	8	61	34	+27	25	
6	IFK Stockholm	22	10	3	9	49	41	+8	23	
7	IK City	22	7	6	9	39	37	+2	20	
8	Köpings IS	22	9	1	12	47	55	−8	19	
9	IK Brage	22	7	5	10	38	46	−8	19	
10	IFK Kumla	22	6	2	14	37	53	−16	14	Relegation to Division 3
11	Malungs IF	22	5	0	17	31	100	−69	10	Relegation to Division 3
12	Södertälje SK	22	3	2	17	26	89	−63	8	Relegation to Division 3

=== Västra Götaland ===
Pos	Team	Pld	W	D	L	GF	GA	GD	Pts	Qualification or relegation
1	IF Elfsborg	22	20	1	1	80	29	+51	41	Playoffs for promotion to Allsvenskan
2	IK Oddevold	22	13	2	7	62	43	+19	28	
3	Norrby IF	22	12	3	7	45	38	+7	27	
4	Halmstads BK	22	10	5	7	59	42	+17	25	
5	Husqvarna IF	22	11	3	8	51	38	+13	25	
6	Östers IF	22	10	4	8	48	45	+3	24	
7	GAIS	22	9	4	9	39	37	+2	22	
8	Billingsfors IK	22	6	5	11	39	49	−10	17	
9	Fässbergs IF	22	7	3	12	28	54	−26	17	
10	Waggeryds IK	22	7	2	13	51	64	−13	16	Relegation to Division 3
11	Tidaholms GIF	22	4	4	14	38	74	−36	12	Relegation to Division 3
12	Trollhättans IF	22	2	6	14	33	69	−36	10	Relegation to Division 3

=== Östra Götaland ===
Pos	Team	Pld	W	D	L	GF	GA	GD	Pts	Qualification or relegation
1	IFK Kristianstad	22	14	4	4	49	32	+17	32	Playoffs for promotion to Allsvenskan
2	Landskrona BoIS	22	12	7	3	44	20	+24	31	
3	Högadals IS	22	13	4	5	43	27	+16	30	
4	BK Derby	22	11	3	8	43	30	+13	25	
5	IF Saab	22	7	8	7	27	31	−4	22	
6	Råå IF	22	9	3	10	42	33	+9	21	
7	Motala AIF	22	6	8	8	30	30	0	20	
8	Kalmar FF	22	8	4	10	38	43	−5	20	
9	Gunnarstorps IF	22	6	6	10	27	38	−11	18	
10	Höganäs BK	22	7	2	13	24	43	−19	16	Relegation to Division 3
11	IK Sleipner	22	5	5	12	26	42	−16	15	Relegation to Division 3
12	Perstorps SK	22	6	2	14	32	56	−24	14	Relegation to Division 3

== Allsvenskan promotion playoffs ==
Pos	Team	Pld	W	D	L	GF	GA	GD	Pts	Promotion
1	IF Elfsborg	3	3	0	0	10	6	+4	6	Promotion to Allsvenskan
2	Örebro SK	3	2	0	1	8	3	+5	4	Promotion to Allsvenskan
3	IFK Luleå	3	1	0	2	4	6	−2	2	
4	IFK Kristianstad	3	0	0	3	5	12	−7	0	
