= 1924–25 Division 2 (Swedish football) =

Swedish League Division 2
- Season: 1924–25
- Champions: Brynäs IF; IK City; Westermalms IF; IFK Uddevalla; IS Halmia
- Promoted: IK City; IFK Uddevalla
- Relegated: Avesta IF; Södertälje IF; IFK Nyköping; IFK Vänersborg; IK Virgo

Statistics of Division 2 of Swedish football for the 1924–25 season.

== League standings ==
=== Division 2 Uppsvenska Serien 1924–25 ===
Teams from a large part of northern Sweden, approximately above the province of Medelpad, were not allowed to play in the national league system until the 1953–54 season, and a championship was instead played to decide the best team in Norrland.

Pos	Team	Pld	W	D	L	GF	GA	GD	Pts	Qualification or relegation
1	Brynäs IF	14	13	1	0	60	17	+43	27	
2	Gefle IF	14	9	3	2	70	25	+45	21	
3	Sandvikens IF	14	8	2	4	44	30	+14	18	
4	Sandvikens AIK	14	5	2	7	37	38	−1	12 (Note: Tie breaker is goal average.)	
5	Skutskärs IF	14	5	2	7	27	40	−13	12	
6	Falu IK	14	5	2	7	23	47	−24	12	
7	Domnarvets GIF	14	3	3	8	20	38	−18	9	
8	Avesta IF	14	0	1	13	15	61	−46	1	Relegated to Division 3
–	Grycksbo IF (Note: Grycksbo IF were excluded from the league after the team did not turn up for their match against Sandvikens IF in the last round. Their match results are not included in the table of the other teams.)	16	3	3	10	19	38	−19	9	Relegated to Division 3

Notes:

No teams from Uppsvenska Serien were allowed to be promoted to Allsvenskan, due to both geographic and economic reasons.

=== Division 2 Mellansvenska Serien 1924–25 ===
Pos	Team	Pld	W	D	L	GF	GA	GD	Pts	Qualification or relegation
1	IK City	16	12	0	4	39	19	+20	24	Playoffs for promotion to Allsvenskan
2	Hallstahammars SK	16	9	4	3	43	27	+16	22	
3	Katrineholms SK	16	10	1	5	34	26	+8	21	
4	Örebro IK	16	6	3	7	35	35	0	15 (Note: Tie breaker is goal average.)	
5	Köpings IS	16	5	5	6	35	37	−2	15	
6	IFK Västerås	16	5	4	7	19	19	0	14	
7	Katrineholms AIK	16	6	2	8	35	42	−7	14	
8	Örebro SK	16	4	5	7	28	27	+1	13	Relegated to Division 3
9	IFK Arboga	16	3	0	13	17	53	−36	6	Relegated to Division 3

=== Division 2 Östsvenska Serien 1924–25 ===
Pos	Team	Pld	W	D	L	GF	GA	GD	Pts	Qualification or relegation
1	Westermalms IF	20	16	3	1	75	14	+61	35	Playoffs for promotion to Allsvenskan
2	Sundbybergs IK	20	14	4	2	50	19	+31	32	
3	Djurgårdens IF	20	11	4	5	65	18	+47	26	
4	Reymersholms IK	20	11	1	8	47	29	+18	23	
5	IK Sirius	20	9	2	9	47	35	+12	20 (Note: Tie breaker is goal average.)	
6	IF Linnéa	20	8	4	8	62	51	+11	20	
7	Mariebergs IK	20	8	4	8	32	32	0	20	
8	Stockholms BK	20	8	4	8	31	43	−12	20	
9	IFK Stockholm	20	6	3	11	32	47	−15	15	
10	Södertälje IF	20	3	1	16	21	89	−68	7	Relegated to Division 3
11	IFK Nyköping	20	1	0	19	19	104	−85	2	Relegated to Division 3

=== Division 2 Västsvenska Serien 1924–25 ===
Pos	Team	Pld	W	D	L	GF	GA	GD	Pts	Qualification or relegation
1	IFK Uddevalla	16	13	1	2	61	13	+48	27	Playoffs for promotion to Allsvenskan
2	Jonsereds IF	16	10	2	4	41	18	+23	22	
3	Fässbergs IF	16	8	3	5	26	16	+10	19	
4	IF Elfsborg	16	7	4	5	25	20	+5	18	
5	Skara IF	16	4	9	3	22	26	−4	17	
6	IF Heimer	16	4	6	6	19	27	−8	14	
7	Vänersborgs IF	16	4	5	7	19	39	−20	13	
8	IFK Vänersborg	16	4	1	11	18	42	−24	9	Relegated to Division 3
9	IK Virgo	16	1	3	12	8	38	−30	5	Relegated to Division 3

=== Division 2 Sydsvenska Serien 1924–25 ===
Pos	Team	Pld	W	D	L	GF	GA	GD	Pts	Qualification or relegation
1	IS Halmia	14	9	3	2	22	13	+9	21	Playoffs for promotion to Allsvenskan
2	Halmstads BK	14	6	6	2	32	16	+16	18	
3	Varbergs GIF	14	8	1	5	25	19	+6	17	
4	IFK Helsingborg	14	7	2	5	21	18	+3	16	
5	Malmö FF	14	6	3	5	35	32	+3	15	
6	Malmö BI	14	6	2	6	29	30	−1	14	
7	Falkenbergs GIK	14	2	2	10	8	28	−20	6	Relegated to Division 3
8	Lunds BK	14	2	1	11	14	30	−16	5	Relegated to Division 3
