= 1938–39 Division 2 (Swedish football) =

Swedish League Division 2
- Season: 1938–39
- Champions: Hammarby IF; IFK Norrköping; IFK Göteborg; Halmstads BK
- Promoted: Hammarby IF; IFK Göteborg
- Relegated: Bollnäs GIF; IFK Grängesberg; IF Rune; Motala AIF; Arvika BK; Fässbergs IF; Oskarströms IS; Kalmar AIK

Statistics of Swedish football Division 2 for the 1938–39 season.

== League standings ==
=== Division 2 Norra 1938–39 ===
Teams from a large part of northern Sweden, approximately above the province of Medelpad, were not allowed to play in the national league system until the 1953–54 season, and a championship was instead played to decide the best team in Norrland.

Pos	Team	Pld	W	D	L	GF	GA	GD	Pts	Qualification or relegation
1	Hammarby IF	18	12	2	4	46	20	+26	26	Playoffs for promotion to Allsvenskan
2	Ludvika FfI	18	10	4	4	40	27	+13	24	
3	Djurgårdens IF	18	9	4	5	43	32	+11	22	
4	Ljusne AIK	18	7	6	5	41	28	+13	20 (Note: Tie breaker is goal average.)	
5	Reymersholms IK	18	7	6	5	40	30	+10	20	
6	Värtans IK	18	8	2	8	29	28	+1	18	
7	Gefle IF	18	7	3	8	37	37	0	17	
8	Enköpings SK	18	5	5	8	27	43	−16	15	
9	Bollnäs GIF	18	4	2	12	18	50	−32	10	Relegated to Division 3
10	IFK Grängesberg	18	2	4	12	26	52	−26	8	Relegated to Division 3

=== Division 2 Östra 1938–39 ===
Pos	Team	Pld	W	D	L	GF	GA	GD	Pts	Qualification or relegation
1	IFK Norrköping	18	13	3	2	44	15	+29	29	Playoffs for promotion to Allsvenskan
2	IFK Eskilstuna	18	13	2	3	59	19	+40	28	
3	Skärblacka IF	18	11	2	5	47	25	+22	24	
4	Surahammars IF	18	7	5	6	37	30	+7	19	
5	Mjölby AI	18	7	3	8	33	35	−2	17 (Note: Tie breaker is goal average.)	
6	Husqvarna IF	18	7	3	8	29	55	−26	17	
7	IK Tord	18	6	4	8	27	31	−4	16	
8	IFK Västerås	18	6	3	9	31	35	−4	15	League transfer within league level
9	IF Rune	18	2	4	12	35	66	−31	8	Relegated to Division 3
10	Motala AIF	18	3	1	14	25	56	−31	7	Relegated to Division 3

=== Division 2 Västra 1938–39 ===
Pos	Team	Pld	W	D	L	GF	GA	GD	Pts	Qualification or relegation
1	IFK Göteborg	18	13	4	1	48	11	+37	30	Playoffs for promotion to Allsvenskan
2	GAIS	18	12	5	1	42	13	+29	29	
3	Varbergs BoIS	18	12	2	4	38	22	+16	26	
4	Tidaholms GIF	18	8	5	5	40	24	+16	21	
5	Billingsfors IK	18	8	2	8	31	37	−6	18	
6	Karlskoga IF	18	5	6	7	29	37	−8	16	
7	Jonsereds IF	18	6	3	9	27	25	+2	15	
8	Deje IK	18	3	4	11	27	45	−18	10	
9	Arvika BK	18	2	4	12	28	63	−35	8	Relegated to Division 3
10	Fässbergs IF	18	2	3	13	21	54	−33	7	Relegated to Division 3

=== Division 2 Södra 1938–39 ===
Pos	Team	Pld	W	D	L	GF	GA	GD	Pts	Qualification or relegation
1	Halmstads BK	18	14	1	3	54	20	+34	29 (Note: Tie breaker is goal average.)	Playoffs for promotion to Allsvenskan
2	IS Halmia	18	13	3	2	49	22	+27	29	
3	BK Landora	18	9	4	5	38	30	+8	22	
4	Malmö BI	18	9	1	8	39	39	0	19 (Note: Tie breaker is goal average and (probably) number of won matches.)	
5	IFK Trelleborg	18	8	3	7	42	42	0	19	
6	IFK Värnamo	18	7	4	7	36	32	+4	18	
7	IFK Malmö	18	6	2	10	41	49	−8	14	
8	Höganäs BK	18	5	2	11	30	42	−12	12	
9	Oskarströms IS	18	4	3	11	25	36	−11	11	Relegated to Division 3
10	Kalmar AIK	18	2	3	13	23	65	−42	7	Relegated to Division 3
