= Agne Boklund =

Swedish association football player

Personal information
- Full name: Agne Sigurd Boklund
- Date of birth: 29 September 1904
- Place of birth: Malmö, Sweden
- Date of death: 6 August 1949 (aged 44)
- Place of death: Malmö, Sweden
- Position: Goalkeeper

Senior career*
Years	Team	Apps	(Gls)
–1923	Malmö BI		
1923–1924	IFK Malmö		
1924–1927	Santos	58	(0)
1927–1933	IFK Malmö	83+	
- * Club domestic league appearances and goals

Agne Sigurd Boklund (29 September 1904 – 6 August 1949) was a Swedish footballer who played as a goalkeeper.

== Club career ==
Boklund began his career with Malmö BI before signing with IFK Malmö for a short period of time. In 1924, he moved to Brazil and began work at both the Johnson Line, a shipping company, and the Swedish consulate in São Paulo. He initially had no intention to play football in the new country, but was eventually persuaded by a Swedish companion, who incidentally had membership in Santos, to join the Brazilian powerhouse club. He became the first Swedish footballer to ever play in Brazil. He made 58 appearances during his three years in Brazil, including playing a game against José Leandro Andrade. Notably, Boklund missed a crucial game against Ypiranga because of a torrential rainstorm, which stranded him between Itapetininga and Sorocaba. He sent a letter to the Santos board to explain his absence. The handwritten letter was re-discovered in 2018 and made the club realize they had incorrectly recorded his presence in the game in their statistics. In 1927 Boklund returned to Sweden and IFK Malmö. He made his Allsvenskan debut on 5 August 1928 against Helsingborgs IF, and proceeded to play another 83 Allsvenskan games. He passed away on 6 August 1949, at the age of 44.
