= Bertil Johansson =

Swedish footballer (1935–2021)

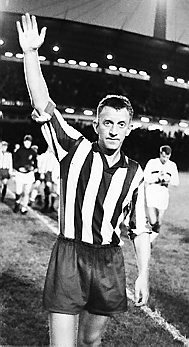
- Bertil Johansson

Personal information
- Date of birth: 22 March 1935
- Place of birth: Gothenburg, Sweden
- Date of death: 5 May 2021 (aged 86)
- Position: Striker

Youth career
- Sävedalens IF

Senior career*
Years	Team	Apps	(Gls)
1955–1968	IFK Göteborg	267	(162)

International career
1954–1957	Sweden U21	6	(5)
1955–1962	Sweden B	9	(4)
1958–1963	Sweden	4	(0)

Managerial career
- 1967–1970: IFK Göteborg
- * Club domestic league appearances and goals

John Bertil "Bebben" Johansson (22 March 1935 – 5 May 2021) was a Swedish football player who played as a striker, most notably for IFK Göteborg. He was also a football manager.

== Career ==
After starting his career playing for the local club Sävedalens IF, he joined IFK Göteborg in 1955 and won a Swedish Championship with the club. He won four caps for the Sweden national team between 1958 and 1963. He also represented the Sweden U21 and B teams.

After retiring as a player in 1968, he coached the team for two years and won another Swedish Championship.

In the wintertime, he played handball for Redbergslids IK.

== Personal life ==
Johansson died on 5 May 2021, at the age of 86.

== Career statistics ==
=== Club ===
Appearances and goals by club, season and competition
Club	Season	League			Svenska Cupen		Continental		Other		Total	
Club	Season	Division	Apps	Goals	Apps	Goals	Apps	Goals	Apps	Goals	Apps	Goals
IFK Göteborg	1954–55	Allsvenskan	4	0	0	0	0	0	1	0	5	0
IFK Göteborg	1955–56	Allsvenskan	22	12	0	0	0	0	13	9	35	21
IFK Göteborg	1956–57	Allsvenskan	22	8	0	0	0	0	18	26	40	34
IFK Göteborg	1957–58	Allsvenskan	32	27	0	0	5	2	26	20	63	49
IFK Göteborg	1959	Allsvenskan	22	17	0	0	5	2	12	12	39	31
IFK Göteborg	1960	Allsvenskan	21	17	0	0	0	0	7	2	28	19
IFK Göteborg	1961	Allsvenskan	20	20	0	0	2	0	20	14	42	34
IFK Göteborg	1962	Allsvenskan	22	18	0	0	0	0	16	9	38	27
IFK Göteborg	1963	Allsvenskan	22	13	0	0	0	0	21	12	43	25
IFK Göteborg	1964	Allsvenskan	22	10	0	0	0	0	15	7	37	17
IFK Göteborg	1965	Allsvenskan	21	7	0	0	0	0	16	6	37	13
IFK Göteborg	1966	Allsvenskan	18	8	0	0	0	0	8	2	26	10
IFK Göteborg	1967	Allsvenskan	10	2	1	0	0	0	8	5	19	7
IFK Göteborg	1968	Allsvenskan	10	3	0	0	0	0	2	0	12	3
Total			267	162	1	0	12	4	183	124	464	290

=== International ===
Appearances and goals by national team and year
National team	Year	Apps	Goals
Sweden	1958	1	0
Sweden	1959	0	0
Sweden	1960	0	0
Sweden	1961	1	0
Sweden	1962	1	0
Sweden	1963	1	0
Total		4	0

== Honours ==
=== Player ===
IFK Göteborg

- Allsvenskan; 1957–58

Individual

- Allsvenskan top scorer: 1957–58 (shared with Henry Källgren), 1961
- Kristallkulan: 1967

=== Manager ===
IFK Göteborg

- Allsvenskan: 1969
