= 1929–30 Allsvenskan =

6th season of Allsvenskan

Allsvenskan
- Season: 1929–30
- Champions: Hälsingborgs IF
- Relegated: IFK Norrköping; Stattena IF
- Top goalscorer: Harry Lundahl, Hälsingborgs IF (26)
- Average attendance: 6,712

Allsvenskan 1929–30, part of the 1929–30 Swedish football season, was the sixth Allsvenskan season played. The first match was played 4 August 1929 and the last match was played 1 June 1930. Hälsingborgs IF won the league ahead of runners-up IFK Göteborg, while IFK Norrköping and Stattena IF were relegated.

== Participating clubs ==
Location of the participating clubs

Club	Last season	First season in league	First season of current spell
AIK	9th	1924–25	1924–25
IF Elfsborg	6th	1926–27	1926–27
GAIS	5th	1924–25	1924–25
IFK Göteborg	3rd	1924–25	1924–25
Hälsingborgs IF	1st	1924–25	1924–25
Landskrona BoIS	7th	1924–25	1924–25
IFK Malmö	8th	1924–25	1928–29
IFK Norrköping	10th	1924–25	1924–25
Sandvikens IF	1st (Division 2 Norra)	1929–30	1929–30
IK Sleipner	4th	1924–25	1924–25
Stattena IF	1st (Division 2 Södra)	1927–28	1929–30
Örgryte IS	2nd	1924–25	1924–25

== League table ==
Pos	Team	Pld	W	D	L	GF	GA	GD	Pts	Qualification or relegation
1	Hälsingborgs IF (C)	22	13	5	4	78	33	+45	31	
2	IFK Göteborg	22	12	6	4	67	28	+39	30	
3	IK Sleipner	22	12	5	5	48	37	+11	29	
4	GAIS	22	11	6	5	46	31	+15	28	
5	AIK	22	10	6	6	52	35	+17	26	
6	Örgryte IS	22	12	2	8	59	43	+16	26	
7	Landskrona BoIS	22	8	4	10	54	56	−2	20	
8	IF Elfsborg	22	8	4	10	45	49	−4	20	
9	Sandvikens IF	22	8	1	13	39	56	−17	17	
10	IFK Malmö	22	6	4	12	37	59	−22	16	
11	IFK Norrköping (R)	22	5	2	15	32	77	−45	12	Relegation to Division 2
12	Stattena (R)	22	3	3	16	28	81	−53	9	Relegation to Division 2

Rules for classification: 1) points; 2) goal difference; 3) number of goals scored.
(C) Champions; (R) Relegated

== Results ==
Home \ Away	AIK	IFE	GAIS	IFKG	HIF	LBoIS	IFKM	IFKN	SaIF	IKS	StIF	ÖIS
AIK		3–3	1–1	0–3	5–1	5–1	2–1	3–1	1–2	3–1	6–0	3–3
IF Elfsborg	1–2		0–1	0–2	3–4	3–2	3–2	3–2	4–1	1–0	2–1	4–0
GAIS	1–1	6–4		1–1	0–3	4–1	3–1	5–0	1–2	0–2	3–1	1–0
IFK Göteborg	3–1	1–6	4–0		2–2	1–5	7–0	4–0	6–0	1–1	8–0	0–2
Hälsingborgs IF	5–0	6–2	2–2	2–2		8–3	2–3	11–0	2–1	6–1	7–0	0–1
Landskrona BoIS	1–3	0–0	1–1	0–5	3–2		9–2	6–1	5–0	1–2	4–1	0–5
IFK Malmö	1–1	1–1	1–1	0–0	0–3	0–2		4–1	2–0	2–5	2–0	4–6
IFK Norrköping	1–4	3–0	1–4	2–5	1–1	1–2	2–4		4–2	0–7	2–3	5–3
Sandvikens IF	2–1	4–1	4–2	0–1	2–5	2–2	4–1	4–0		1–3	5–1	1–6
IK Sleipner	1–1	1–0	0–6	2–2	1–1	3–1	1–0	1–1	3–0		3–1	2–0
Stattena IF	0–5	3–3	1–2	1–8	0–2	2–2	4–3	1–2	2–1	3–4		2–6
Örgryte IS	2–1	4–1	0–1	3–1	1–3	5–3	2–3	0–2	3–1	6–4	1–1	

Legend: Blue = home team win; Yellow = draw; Red = away team win.

== Top scorers ==
	Player	Nat	Club	Goals
1	Harry Lundahl	(Sweden)	Hälsingborgs IF	26
2	Sven Rydell	(Sweden)	Örgryte IS	23
2	Filip Johansson	(Sweden)	IFK Göteborg	23
4	Gunnar Rydberg	(Sweden)	IFK Göteborg	17
5	Charles Brommesson	(Sweden)	Hälsingborgs IF	16
5	Sven Jonasson	(Sweden)	IF Elfsborg	16

== Attendances ==
#	Club	Average	Highest
1	AIK	15,997	19,867
2	IFK Göteborg	11,091	24,348
3	Örgryte IS	9,429	17,840
4	GAIS	9,095	18,661
5	Hälsingborgs IF	6,569	12,683
6	IFK Malmö	5,985	12,700
7	IK Sleipner	5,607	7,683
8	IF Elfsborg	4,437	6,760
9	Sandvikens IF	3,588	7,776
10	IFK Norrköping	3,509	5,287
11	Stattena IF	2,869	4,620
12	Landskrona BoIS	2,495	6,989
