= 1924–25 Allsvenskan =

Inaugural season of Allsvenskan

Allsvenskan
- Season: 1924–25
- Champions: GAIS
- Relegated: Västerås IK Fotboll; Hammarby IF
- Matches: 132
- Goals: 542 (4.11 per match)
- Top goalscorer: Filip "Svarte-Filip" Johansson, IFK Göteborg (39)
- Average attendance: 2,891

The 1924–25 Allsvenskan, part of the 1924–25 Swedish football season, was the inaugural season of Sweden's new first-tier football league, replacing Svenska Serien, which had been the name of the top tier since 1910. The first match was played on 3 August 1924 and the last match was played on 7 June 1925. GAIS won the league ahead of runners-up IFK Göteborg, while Västerås IK and Hammarby IF were relegated.

A total of 12 teams participated in the league; 11 teams had played in Svenska Serien for the 1923–24 season and one team, Västerås IK, had played in Division 2.

== Participating clubs ==
1924–25 Allsvenskan team map

Club	Last season	First season in league	First season of current spell
AIK	1st (Svenska Serien Östra)	1924–25	1924–25
IFK Eskilstuna	3rd (Svenska Serien Östra)	1924–25	1924–25
GAIS	2nd (Svenska Serien Västra)	1924–25	1924–25
IFK Göteborg	4th (Svenska Serien Västra)	1924–25	1924–25
Hammarby IF	4th (Svenska Serien Östra)	1924–25	1924–25
Hälsingborgs IF	3rd (Svenska Serien Västra)	1924–25	1924–25
Landskrona BoIS	6th (Svenska Serien Västra)	1924–25	1924–25
IFK Malmö	5th (Svenska Serien Västra)	1924–25	1924–25
IFK Norrköping	5th (Svenska Serien Östra)	1924–25	1924–25
IK Sleipner	2nd (Svenska Serien Östra)	1924–25	1924–25
Västerås IK	1st (Div. 2 Mellansvenska Serien)	1924–25	1924–25
Örgryte IS	1st (Svenska Serien Västra)	1924–25	1924–25

== League table ==
Pos	Team	Pld	W	D	L	GF	GA	GD	Pts	Qualification or relegation
1	GAIS (C)	22	17	4	1	63	16	+47	38	
2	IFK Göteborg	22	16	4	2	87	30	+57	36	
3	Örgryte IS	22	15	5	2	67	17	+50	35	
4	Hälsingborgs IF	22	12	4	6	50	29	+21	28	
5	AIK	22	12	0	10	57	38	+19	24	
6	Landskrona BoIS	22	7	6	9	30	52	−22	20	
7	IK Sleipner	22	7	4	11	37	49	−12	18	
8	IFK Norrköping	22	8	1	13	27	49	−22	17	
9	IFK Eskilstuna	22	6	4	12	41	58	−17	16	
10	IFK Malmö	22	5	5	12	39	55	−16	15	
11	Västerås IK (R)	22	2	5	15	21	66	−45	9	Relegation to Division 2
12	Hammarby IF (R)	22	2	4	16	23	83	−60	8	Relegation to Division 2

Rules for classification: 1) points; 2) goal difference; 3) number of goals scored.
(C) Champions; (R) Relegated

== Results ==
Home \ Away	AIK	IFKE	GAIS	IFKG	HAM	HÄL	LBoIS	IFKM	IFKN	IKS	VIK	ÖIS
AIK		6–1	0–2	3–4	1–0	5–2	3–1	6–3	5–0	3–2	5–1	1–3
IFK Eskilstuna	2–5		1–2	2–8	7–2	1–1	5–0	2–0	1–1	1–3	1–0	1–4
GAIS	2–1	4–0		3–4	5–1	3–2	6–0	6–0	3–2	4–0	4–0	1–1
IFK Göteborg	1–0	2–2	1–3		8–0	2–1	6–0	6–1	3–1	9–1	8–1	2–2
Hammarby IF	1–7	0–2	0–5	0–6		0–6	3–3	1–1	1–2	3–3	1–3	2–1
Hälsingborgs IF	1–0	3–2	1–2	2–3	4–1		1–2	4–2	4–3	1–0	5–0	1–1
Landskrona BoIS	3–0	2–2	0–0	0–4	2–3	1–1		2–4	2–1	1–0	4–0	0–5
IFK Malmö	0–1	8–3	0–3	1–1	3–1	1–3	0–1		4–1	4–1	3–3	0–1
IFK Norrköping	1–0	2–1	0–2	4–1	2–0	0–4	0–1	2–1		3–2	0–1	0–5
IK Sleipner	2–1	2–1	1–2	2–2	6–1	0–2	2–2	1–1	4–0		2–0	0–1
Västerås IK	1–3	0–1	1–1	1–5	1–1	0–1	2–2	2–2	1–2	1–2		1–5
Örgryte IS	5–1	3–2	0–0	0–1	5–1	0–0	4–1	4–0	3–0	6–1	7–1	

Legend: Blue = home team win; Yellow = draw; Red = away team win.

== Attendances ==
	Club	Home average	Away average	Home high
1	Örgryte IS	6,297	3,755	11,046
2	AIK	5,436	3,467	12,000
3	GAIS	5,073	4,173	8,768
4	IFK Göteborg	4,440	4,622	7,330
5	Hammarby IF	4,182	2,263	12,000
6	Hälsingborgs IF	3,471	3,294	6,000
7	IFK Malmö	1,966	2,570	3,276
8	IK Sleipner	1,794	2,891	2,800
9	Landskrona BoIS	1,620	3,108	2,315
10	IFK Norrköping	1,557	3,930	2,300
11	IFK Eskilstuna	1,505	2,525	2,700
12	Västerås IK	1,125	1,867	2,300
—	Total	3,205	—	12,000

== Top scorers ==
	Player	Nat	Club	Goals
1	Filip Johansson	(Sweden)	IFK Göteborg	39
2	Sven Rydell	(Sweden)	Örgryte IS	23
3	Gunnar Rydberg	(Sweden)	IFK Göteborg	21
4	Carl-Erik Holmberg	(Sweden)	Örgryte IS	18
4	Albert Olsson	(Sweden)	GAIS	18
