= 1939–40 Allsvenskan =

16th season of Allsvenskan

Allsvenskan
- Season: 1939–40
- Champions: IF Elfsborg
- Relegated: Örgryte IS; Hammarby IF
- Top goalscorer: Anders Pålsson, Hälsingborgs IF (17)
- Average attendance: 5,498

Statistics of Allsvenskan in season 1939/1940.

== Overview ==
The league was contested by 12 teams, with IF Elfsborg winning the championship.

== League table ==
Pos	Team	Pld	W	D	L	GF	GA	GD	Pts	Qualification or relegation
1	IF Elfsborg (C)	22	13	6	3	66	31	+35	32	
2	IFK Göteborg	22	15	2	5	49	27	+22	32	
3	Hälsingborgs IF	22	12	3	7	49	32	+17	27	
4	IK Brage	22	10	6	6	42	38	+4	26	
5	Sandvikens IF	22	10	2	10	38	37	+1	22	
6	AIK	22	8	5	9	38	38	0	21	
7	Landskrona BoIS	22	7	7	8	42	50	−8	21	
8	IK Sleipner	22	8	5	9	33	49	−16	21	
9	Gårda	22	5	10	7	27	39	−12	20	
10	Malmö FF	22	4	10	8	25	28	−3	18	
11	Örgryte IS (R)	22	3	8	11	28	44	−16	14	Relegation to Division 2
12	Hammarby IF (R)	22	3	4	15	34	58	−24	10	Relegation to Division 2

Rules for classification: 1) points; 2) goal difference; 3) number of goals scored.
(C) Champions; (R) Relegated

== Results ==
Home \ Away	AIK	GBK	HAIF	HÄIF	IFE	IFK	IKB	IKS	BOIS	MFF	SIF	ÖIS
AIK		2–2	2–1	0–4	2–3	2–2	1–0	2–0	4–1	0–0	3–2	4–2
Gårda BK	1–0		2–2	2–2	2–1	1–2	1–0	3–0	1–1	0–0	3–2	1–1
Hammarby IF	0–3	7–1		2–5	1–4	0–1	0–2	0–2	3–5	2–2	2–1	1–1
Hälsingborgs IF	4–1	4–2	5–2		0–2	1–2	3–2	4–0	3–1	2–1	4–0	0–0
IF Elfsborg	2–2	3–1	2–2	2–1		3–2	8–0	2–2	7–0	1–1	1–1	3–1
IFK Göteborg	3–2	1–0	6–1	2–0	2–1		2–1	7–2	6–0	1–0	1–3	3–1
IK Brage	2–1	1–1	3–2	5–1	2–0	2–0		3–0	1–1	2–1	5–3	2–2
IK Sleipner	4–3	1–1	2–3	1–1	0–5	2–0	1–1		3–1	3–2	3–2	2–0
Landskrona BoIS	3–2	7–1	2–0	0–1	2–2	1–2	4–4	1–1		5–2	2–1	1–1
Malmö FF	0–0	0–0	3–1	2–1	1–4	1–1	0–0	4–1	0–0		1–2	0–0
Sandvikens IF	0–1	1–0	3–2	2–0	2–4	2–1	5–1	0–2	3–0	1–0		1–1
Örgryte IS	2–1	1–1	1–0	1–3	4–6	1–2	1–3	4–1	2–4	1–4	0–1	

Legend: Blue = home team win; Yellow = draw; Red = away team win.

== Attendances ==
#	Club	Average	Highest
1	AIK	8,291	15,348
2	Hammarby IF	8,035	16,384
3	IFK Göteborg	7,873	14,298
4	Malmö FF	5,997	9,576
5	Örgryte IS	5,813	12,490
6	Gårda BK	5,497	10,897
7	Hälsingborgs IF	5,365	9,189
8	IF Elfsborg	5,201	9,709
9	IK Brage	4,194	8,103
10	IK Sleipner	4,084	7,093
11	Landskrona BoIS	2,837	5,423
12	Sandvikens IF	2,553	4,453
