= 1926–27 Allsvenskan =

3rd season of Allsvenskan

Allsvenskan
- Season: 1926–27
- Champions: GAIS
- Relegated: Westermalms IF; IFK Uddevalla
- Top goalscorer: Albert Olsson, GAIS (24)
- Average attendance: 4,656

Allsvenskan 1926–27, part of the 1926–27 Swedish football season, was the third Allsvenskan season played. The first match was played 1 August 1926 and the last match was played 6 June 1927. GAIS won the league ahead of runners-up IFK Göteborg, while Westermalms IF and IFK Uddevalla were relegated.

== Participating clubs ==
Location of the participating clubs

Club	Last season	First season in league	First season of current spell
AIK	5th	1924–25	1924–25
IF Elfsborg	1st (Div. 2 Västsvenska Serien)	1926–27	1926–27
IFK Eskilstuna	9th	1924–25	1924–25
GAIS	2nd	1924–25	1924–25
IFK Göteborg	3rd	1924–25	1924–25
Hälsingborgs IF	4th	1924–25	1924–25
Landskrona BoIS	7th	1924–25	1924–25
IFK Norrköping	6th	1924–25	1924–25
IK Sleipner	8th	1924–25	1924–25
IFK Uddevalla	10th	1925–26	1925–26
Westermalms IF	1st (Div. 2 Östsvenska Serien)	1926–27	1926–27
Örgryte IS	1st	1924–25	1924–25

== League table ==
Pos	Team	Pld	W	D	L	GF	GA	GD	Pts	Qualification or relegation
1	GAIS (C)	22	16	4	2	70	25	+45	36	
2	IFK Göteborg	22	16	1	5	58	27	+31	33	
3	Hälsingborgs IF	22	16	0	6	74	34	+40	32	
4	Örgryte IS	22	13	3	6	43	30	+13	29	
5	AIK	22	10	3	9	38	36	+2	23	
6	IK Sleipner	22	9	2	11	44	42	+2	20	
7	IFK Eskilstuna	22	7	5	10	51	61	−10	19	
8	IFK Norrköping	22	6	6	10	35	50	−15	18	
9	Landskrona BoIS	22	7	2	13	36	56	−20	16	
10	IF Elfsborg	22	6	4	12	33	60	−27	16	
11	Westermalm (R)	22	5	4	13	35	58	−23	14	Relegation to Division 2
12	IFK Uddevalla (R)	22	2	4	16	27	65	−38	8	Relegation to Division 2

Rules for classification: 1) points; 2) goal difference; 3) number of goals scored.
(C) Champions; (R) Relegated

== Results ==
Home \ Away	AIK	IFE	IFKE	GAIS	IFKG	HIF	LBoIS	IFKN	IKS	IFKU	WIF	ÖIS
AIK		2–3	2–1	1–4	2–3	1–3	4–0	2–1	2–1	3–2	1–1	2–0
IF Elfsborg	1–1		2–3	0–5	1–0	1–4	2–1	2–4	0–3	5–1	5–1	0–1
IFK Eskilstuna	1–3	3–3		1–6	0–3	3–1	5–1	3–3	5–2	2–0	4–1	1–2
GAIS	1–2	7–0	4–0		1–1	2–1	4–1	2–2	2–1	6–0	3–1	2–1
IFK Göteborg	2–0	1–0	3–0	3–4		2–3	4–2	4–0	4–0	1–4	2–0	3–2
Hälsingborgs IF	2–1	7–1	5–3	2–0	4–2		6–0	4–0	4–3	1–0	7–0	2–3
Landskrona BoIS	2–3	2–2	5–1	1–1	1–4	1–2		1–2	1–0	3–1	4–2	0–3
IFK Norrköping	2–1	1–1	2–2	0–3	0–1	2–5	0–3		3–1	1–1	3–0	3–4
IK Sleipner	1–2	2–1	8–2	1–1	0–5	2–0	6–0	5–1		1–0	1–0	1–1
IFK Uddevalla	2–2	2–3	1–7	1–4	1–2	2–8	1–3	1–1	3–2		2–2	0–1
Westermalms IF	1–0	6–0	2–2	3–5	1–6	2–1	1–3	4–1	2–3	4–1		0–0
Örgryte IS	2–1	3–0	2–2	2–3	1–2	3–2	2–1	0–3	3–0	3–1	4–1	

Legend: Blue = home team win; Yellow = draw; Red = away team win.

== Attendances ==
	Club	Home average	Away average	Home high
1	IFK Göteborg	8,210	5,712	18,521
2	AIK	7,205	4,690	12,966
3	Westermalms IF	6,973	3,961	12,830
4	GAIS	6,968	5,101	14,148
5	Örgryte IS	6,757	5,362	15,423
6	Hälsingborgs IF	5,453	7,617	9,259
7	IF Elfsborg	3,532	4,288	4,810
8	IK Sleipner	3,356	3,460	4,403
9	IFK Eskilstuna	2,429	3,988	3,189
10	IFK Norrköping	2,168	3,849	3,757
11	Landskrona BoIS	2,034	3,795	5,653
12	IFK Uddevalla	1,243	4,506	2,116
—	Total	4,694	—	18,521

== Top scorers ==
	Player	Nat	Club	Goals
1	Albert Olsson	(Sweden)	GAIS	24
2	Harry Lundahl	(Sweden)	Hälsingborgs IF	22
3	Filip Johansson	(Sweden)	IFK Göteborg	21
4	Albin Dahl	(Sweden)	Hälsingborgs IF	19
5	Per Kaufeldt	(Sweden)	AIK	16
