= 1925–26 Allsvenskan =

2nd season of Allsvenskan

Allsvenskan
- Season: 1925–26
- Champions: Örgryte IS
- Relegated: IFK Malmö; IK City
- Top goalscorer: Carl-Erik Holmberg, Örgryte IS (29)
- Average attendance: 3,635

The 1925–26 Allsvenskan, part of the 1925–26 Swedish football season, was the second Allsvenskan season played. The first match was played 2 August 1925 and the last match was played 6 June 1926. Örgryte IS won the league ahead of runners-up GAIS, while IFK Malmö and IK City were relegated.

== Participating clubs ==
Location of the participating clubs

Club	Last season	First season in league	First season of current spell
AIK	5th	1924–25	1924–25
IK City	1st (Div. 2 Mellansvenska Serien)	1925–26	1925–26
IFK Eskilstuna	9th	1924–25	1924–25
GAIS	1st	1924–25	1924–25
IFK Göteborg	2nd	1924–25	1924–25
Hälsingborgs IF	4th	1924–25	1924–25
Landskrona BoIS	6th	1924–25	1924–25
IFK Malmö	10th	1924–25	1924–25
IFK Norrköping	8th	1924–25	1924–25
IK Sleipner	7th	1924–25	1924–25
IFK Uddevalla	1st (Div. 2 Västsvenska Serien)	1925–26	1925–26
Örgryte IS	3rd	1924–25	1924–25

== League table ==
Pos	Team	Pld	W	D	L	GF	GA	GD	Pts	Qualification or relegation
1	Örgryte IS (C)	22	15	5	2	75	33	+42	35	
2	GAIS	22	16	2	4	67	20	+47	34	
3	IFK Göteborg	22	13	7	2	65	27	+38	33	
4	Hälsingborgs IF	22	15	2	5	75	36	+39	32	
5	AIK	22	7	7	8	45	50	−5	21	
6	IFK Norrköping	22	9	2	11	47	57	−10	20	
7	Landskrona BoIS	22	7	4	11	56	67	−11	18	
8	IK Sleipner	22	8	2	12	40	52	−12	18	
9	IFK Eskilstuna	22	6	5	11	40	63	−23	17	
10	IFK Uddevalla	22	4	8	10	31	49	−18	16	
11	IFK Malmö (R)	22	4	6	12	30	66	−36	14	Relegation to Division 2
12	City (R)	22	1	4	17	32	83	−51	6	Relegation to Division 2

Rules for classification: 1) points; 2) goal difference; 3) number of goals scored.
(C) Champions; (R) Relegated

== Results ==
Home \ Away	AIK	IKC	IFKE	GAIS	IFKG	HIF	LBoIS	IFKM	IFKN	IKS	IFKU	ÖIS
AIK		4–3	1–0	3–1	3–1	2–5	6–3	3–3	5–3	2–3	0–0	3–3
IK City	0–3		4–3	0–6	4–4	0–4	1–2	0–3	3–4	0–2	2–4	1–3
IFK Eskilstuna	1–1	3–3		0–3	1–4	2–6	3–3	0–0	3–2	1–3	3–3	3–5
GAIS	6–0	5–1	4–1		1–0	5–0	4–0	5–1	1–0	3–2	1–0	2–2
IFK Göteborg	3–0	6–0	8–2	1–1		2–2	4–2	5–1	1–1	2–0	2–1	4–3
Hälsingborgs IF	3–2	5–1	4–1	2–0	1–4		6–1	9–1	7–3	8–3	2–0	0–1
Landskrona BoIS	2–2	5–1	3–1	0–1	2–4	0–2		2–2	4–1	2–7	5–0	2–6
IFK Malmö	2–2	3–3	2–3	0–4	0–0	1–0	0–5		1–2	1–0	5–0	6–1
IFK Norrköping	3–2	4–3	1–3	1–5	1–6	2–0	6–1	5–1		2–1	5–0	0–5
IK Sleipner	0–0	4–0	0–1	0–6	0–3	2–5	1–6	3–1	1–0		3–3	0–3
IFK Uddevalla	2–1	1–1	2–3	2–1	0–0	1–2	3–3	3–0	1–1	1–4		2–2
Örgryte IS	3–0	5–1	1–2	4–2	1–1	2–2	6–3	6–1	3–0	2–1	3–2	

Legend: Blue = home team win; Yellow = draw; Red = away team win.

== Attendances ==
	Club	Home average	Away average	Home high
1	Örgryte IS	6,889	4,031	20,533
2	AIK	6,272	4,207	15,450
3	GAIS	6,095	3,610	15,520
4	IFK Göteborg	6,043	5,294	17,163
5	Hälsingborgs IF	5,084	7,605	10,633
6	IK Sleipner	2,475	2,861	3,729
7	IFK Malmö	2,264	2,869	4,530
8	IFK Eskilstuna	1,974	2,318	2,448
9	IK City	1,818	2,511	2,511
10	Landskrona BoIS	1,790	2,417	3,469
11	IFK Norrköping	1,744	2,870	4,059
12	IFK Uddevalla	1,535	3,390	3,230
—	Total	3,665	—	20,533

== Top scorers ==
	Player	Nat	Club	Goals
1	Carl-Erik Holmberg	(Sweden)	Örgryte IS	29
2	Filip Johansson	(Sweden)	IFK Göteborg	26
3	Brynolf Ekelin	(Sweden)	IFK Norrköping	25
4	Sven Rydell	(Sweden)	Örgryte IS	24
5	Albin Dahl	(Sweden)	Hälsingborgs IF	22
5	Gunnar Rydberg	(Sweden)	IFK Göteborg	22
