= 1957–58 Allsvenskan =

34th season of Allsvenskan

Allsvenskan
- Season: 1957–58
- Champions: IFK Göteborg
- Relegated: IFK Eskilstuna; Motala AIF
- European Cup: IFK Göteborg
- Top goalscorer: Bertil "Bebben" Johansson, IFK Göteborg; Henry Källgren, IFK Norrköping (27)
- Average attendance: 9,879

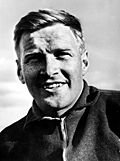
Orvar Bergmark (Örebro SK) - 1958 Guldbollen winner

These are the statistics for the 1957–1958 season of Allsvenskan, the highest level of the Swedish football league system.

== Overview ==
The league was contested by 12 teams, with IFK Göteborg winning the championship. This season began in the summer of 1957, but didn't finish until the autumn of 1958. In this unusually long season, the teams met each other three times instead of twice, resulting in a season consisting of 33 rounds instead of the usual 22. For this reason, it was referred to as the "Marathon Allsvenskan".

== League table ==
Pos	Team	Pld	W	D	L	GF	GA	GD	Pts	Qualification or relegation
1	IFK Göteborg (C)	33	22	3	8	92	49	+43	47	Qualification to 1959–60 European Cup (Note: IFK Göteborg qualified for the 1958–59 European Cup as Allsvenskan leaders in the spring of 1958 after the ordinary round robin.)
2	IFK Norrköping	33	20	7	6	74	43	+31	47	
3	Djurgårdens IF	33	16	10	7	69	48	+21	42	
4	Malmö FF	33	16	8	9	62	49	+13	40	
5	Hälsingborgs IF	33	14	8	11	70	56	+14	36	
6	GAIS	33	12	9	12	44	41	+3	33	
7	IFK Malmö	33	11	6	16	39	59	−20	28	
8	Halmstads BK	33	11	6	16	47	68	−21	28	
9	AIK	33	8	10	15	47	55	−8	26	
10	Sandvikens IF	33	9	8	16	50	61	−11	26	
11	IFK Eskilstuna (R)	33	8	8	17	45	77	−32	24	Relegation to Division 2
12	Motala AIF (R)	33	6	7	20	35	68	−33	19	Relegation to Division 2

Rules for classification: 1) points; 2) goal difference; 3) number of goals scored.
(C) Champions; (R) Relegated

== Results ==
=== Rounds 1–22 ===
Home \ Away	AIK	DIF	GAIS	HBK	HIF	IFKE	IFKG	IFKM	IFKN	MFF	MAIF	SIF
AIK		1–1	2–0	0–1	2–0	1–2	1–4	1–1	0–5	0–0	6–0	1–1
Djurgårdens IF	1–1		1–0	1–0	1–2	4–1	5–1	5–1	2–4	3–0	1–1	2–1
GAIS	3–2	1–1		3–1	3–1	0–3	1–2	1–0	2–2	1–1	0–2	1–1
Halmstads BK	2–2	0–1	1–0		1–3	2–0	1–4	2–0	0–4	2–2	2–2	0–2
Hälsingborgs IF	0–2	1–1	0–1	2–2		8–2	1–2	4–0	1–4	1–2	2–1	1–1
IFK Eskilstuna	2–2	3–3	1–3	1–1	3–1		0–2	1–2	2–0	2–1	0–4	2–0
IFK Göteborg	3–0	2–0	4–2	5–1	6–1	5–2		0–1	3–0	2–5	6–2	3–1
IFK Malmö	3–2	2–4	1–1	1–1	1–1	1–0	1–0		1–4	1–3	1–0	4–0
IFK Norrköping	2–0	1–1	0–0	5–1	3–3	2–0	2–0	2–0		1–1	2–0	3–2
Malmö FF	0–0	5–3	0–0	0–1	2–3	1–0	1–2	3–0	3–1		1–1	0–5
Motala AIF	2–1	0–1	1–2	2–1	1–3	1–1	2–2	1–2	0–1	0–1		2–0
Sandvikens IF	0–0	2–2	3–0	0–1	2–2	4–2	1–3	1–0	2–2	0–1	4–1	

Legend: Blue = home team win; Yellow = draw; Red = away team win.

=== Rounds 23–33 ===
Home \ Away	AIK	DIF	GAIS	HBK	HIF	IFKE	IFKG	IFKM	IFKN	MFF	MAIF	SIF
AIK					4–1	3–5		0–2		1–4		4–0
Djurgårdens IF	0–0		1–0	1–0	2–4			3–2	4–1			
GAIS	1–0			2–3	2–2				2–1			1–0
Halmstads BK	3–1					2–3	1–5	3–1		3–2	4–1	
Hälsingborgs IF				3–0			0–0		2–3	1–0	6–1	
IFK Eskilstuna		2–2	0–6		0–4					1–3	1–1	0–0
IFK Göteborg	2–3	4–3	2–1			5–0					4–0	5–2
IFK Malmö			0–3		0–3	1–0	1–1		1–2		3–1	
IFK Norrköping	4–2			3–2		2–2	2–0					3–1
Malmö FF		2–1	2–1				5–3	4–4	2–1			
Motala AIF	0–2	0–4	0–0						1–2	3–0		1–2
Sandvikens IF		2–4		6–2	1–3			2–0		1–5		

Legend: Blue = home team win; Yellow = draw; Red = away team win.

== Attendances ==
#	Club	Average	Highest
1	IFK Göteborg	16,298	30,094
2	Djurgårdens IF	13,380	26,079
3	Malmö FF	11,686	23,551
4	AIK	11,147	32,086
5	GAIS	10,769	30,934
6	IFK Eskilstuna	9,452	13,219
7	Sandvikens IF	8,450	19,549
8	IFK Malmö	8,163	15,252
9	Hälsingborgs IF	8,106	17,074
10	IFK Norrköping	7,853	14,612
11	Halmstads BK	6,699	9,911
12	Motala AIF	6,527	10,096
