= 1928–29 Allsvenskan =

5th season of Allsvenskan

Allsvenskan
- Season: 1928–29
- Champions: Hälsingborgs IF
- Relegated: IFK Eskilstuna; Westermalms IF
- Top goalscorer: Harry Lundahl, Hälsingborgs IF (31)
- Average attendance: 5,854

Allsvenskan 1928–29, part of the 1928–29 Swedish football season, was the fifth Allsvenskan season played. The first match was played 5 August 1928 and the last match was played 2 June 1929. Hälsingborgs IF won the league ahead of runners-up Örgryte IS, while IFK Eskilstuna and Westermalms IF were relegated.

== Participating clubs ==
Location of the participating clubs

Club	Last season	First season in league	First season of current spell
AIK	7th	1924–25	1924–25
IF Elfsborg	5th	1926–27	1926–27
IFK Eskilstuna	10th	1924–25	1924–25
GAIS	3rd	1924–25	1924–25
IFK Göteborg	4th	1924–25	1924–25
Hälsingborgs IF	2nd	1924–25	1924–25
Landskrona BoIS	9th	1924–25	1924–25
IFK Malmö	1st (Div. 2 Sydsvenska Serien)	1924–25	1928–29
IFK Norrköping	8th	1924–25	1924–25
IK Sleipner	6th	1924–25	1924–25
Westermalms IF	1st (Div. 2 Östsvenska Serien)	1926–27	1928–29
Örgryte IS	1st	1924–25	1924–25

== League table ==
Pos	Team	Pld	W	D	L	GF	GA	GD	Pts	Qualification or relegation
1	Hälsingborgs IF (C)	22	16	3	3	89	35	+54	35	
2	Örgryte IS	22	15	3	4	71	41	+30	33	
3	IFK Göteborg	22	14	4	4	56	34	+22	32	
4	IK Sleipner	22	11	3	8	54	49	+5	25	
5	GAIS	22	9	4	9	47	43	+4	22	
6	IF Elfsborg	22	8	3	11	41	54	−13	19	
7	Landskrona BoIS	22	8	2	12	37	47	−10	18	
8	IFK Malmö	22	8	2	12	32	47	−15	18	
9	AIK	22	7	3	12	47	55	−8	17	
10	IFK Norrköping	22	4	8	10	25	33	−8	16	
11	IFK Eskilstuna (R)	22	7	2	13	41	74	−33	16	Relegation to Division 2
12	Westermalm (R)	22	5	3	14	34	62	−28	13	Relegation to Division 2

Rules for classification: 1) points; 2) goal difference; 3) number of goals scored.
(C) Champions; (R) Relegated

== Results ==
Home \ Away	AIK	IFE	IFKE	GAIS	IFKG	HIF	LBoIS	IFKM	IFKN	IKS	WIF	ÖIS
AIK		5–0	6–2	3–4	3–3	2–3	4–1	2–1	1–0	2–5	3–1	1–4
IF Elfsborg	4–1		5–1	2–2	0–2	0–7	2–1	0–1	1–1	1–2	3–0	1–3
IFK Eskilstuna	5–1	2–0		3–2	0–2	2–3	1–2	0–2	1–1	3–3	2–0	2–5
GAIS	3–2	2–2	5–0		0–0	2–3	1–4	3–1	1–3	6–0	1–0	1–5
IFK Göteborg	2–1	1–2	4–0	3–2		3–2	4–1	2–1	1–0	6–4	1–8	1–1
Hälsingborgs IF	2–2	5–3	13–1	4–1	0–0		5–1	9–2	3–1	6–0	5–1	5–1
Landskrona BoIS	2–1	0–5	3–1	2–3	1–2	0–2		5–0	1–1	4–1	2–3	2–1
IFK Malmö	1–1	3–4	1–2	1–0	5–2	5–1	2–0		0–0	2–1	0–1	1–2
IFK Norrköping	0–3	4–0	0–2	1–2	3–1	2–3	0–1	1–0		1–1	2–2	1–3
IK Sleipner	4–0	5–0	7–5	2–0	3–4	1–0	2–1	1–2	0–0		2–0	4–1
Westermalms IF	4–2	1–2	3–4	2–6	2–1	2–5	2–2	4–0	1–1	1–4		0–1
Örgryte IS	4–1	5–4	6–2	0–0	2–4	3–3	4–1	6–1	5–2	4–2	6–3	

Legend: Blue = home team win; Yellow = draw; Red = away team win.

== Attendances ==
	Club	Home average	Away average	Home high
1	IFK Göteborg	9,513	7,084	18,312
2	Westermalms IF	8,221	5,686	15,219
3	AIK	8,102	5,693	18,288
4	GAIS	7,773	5,768	11,755
5	Örgryte IS	7,296	5,387	12,388
6	Hälsingborgs IF	6,274	7,912	12,413
7	IFK Malmö	6,150	5,931	9,499
8	IF Elfsborg	4,059	5,820	5,246
9	IK Sleipner	3,785	6,107	5,852
10	Landskrona BoIS	3,068	5,504	10,142
11	IFK Eskilstuna	2,888	4,302	4,413
12	IFK Norrköping	2,753	4,686	4,712
—	Total	5,823	—	18,312

== Top scorers ==
	Player	Nat	Club	Goals
1	Harry Lundahl	(Sweden)	Hälsingborgs IF	31
2	Filip Johansson	(Sweden)	IFK Göteborg	23
3	Sven Rydell	(Sweden)	Örgryte IS	22
4	Bror Carlsson	(Sweden)	Örgryte IS	20
5	Charles Brommesson	(Sweden)	Hälsingborgs IF	19
