= 1961 Allsvenskan =

37th season of Allsvenskan

Allsvenskan
- Season: 1961
- Champions: IF Elfsborg
- Relegated: AIK; Sandvikens IF
- European Cup: IFK Göteborg
- Top goalscorer: Bertil "Bebben" Johansson, IFK Göteborg (20)
- Average attendance: 11,265

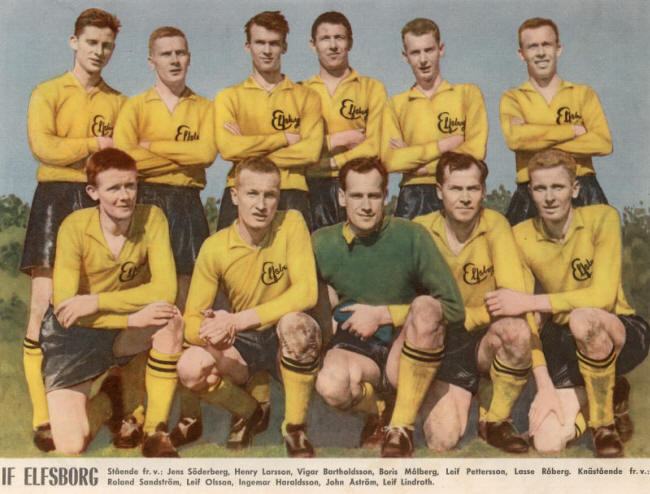

Statistics of Allsvenskan in season 1961.

== Overview ==
The league was contested by 12 teams, with IF Elfsborg winning the championship.

== League table ==
Pos	Team	Pld	W	D	L	GF	GA	GD	Pts	Qualification or relegation
1	IF Elfsborg (C)	22	13	5	4	54	37	+17	31	
2	IFK Norrköping	22	11	4	7	50	30	+20	26	
3	IFK Göteborg	22	11	4	7	62	47	+15	26	Qualification to European Cup preliminary round (Note: IFK Göteborg qualified for the European Cup as Allsvenskan leaders in the spring of 1961.)
4	Örebro SK	22	8	8	6	39	33	+6	24	
5	Malmö FF	22	10	4	8	31	34	−3	24	
6	IFK Malmö	22	8	6	8	30	26	+4	22	
7	Örgryte IS	22	8	5	9	41	39	+2	21	
8	Hälsingborgs IF	22	7	6	9	44	44	0	20	
9	Degerfors IF	22	8	4	10	27	38	−11	20	
10	Hammarby IF	22	7	5	10	33	52	−19	19	
11	AIK (R)	22	6	6	10	29	42	−13	18	Relegation to Division 2
12	Sandvikens IF (R)	22	5	3	14	29	47	−18	13	Relegation to Division 2

Rules for classification: 1) points; 2) goal difference; 3) number of goals scored.
(C) Champions; (R) Relegated

== Results ==
Home \ Away	AIK	DIF	HAIF	HÄIF	IFE	IFKG	IFKM	IFKN	MFF	SIF	ÖSK	ÖIS
AIK		1–1	3–1	2–2	1–4	2–4	3–1	1–1	0–1	2–0	5–1	1–2
Degerfors IF	2–0		2–0	0–4	1–1	0–1	3–1	4–2	0–0	0–2	0–1	0–5
Hammarby IF	1–2	4–3		2–1	4–4	3–3	0–5	1–0	0–2	1–4	0–0	2–2
Hälsingborgs IF	1–1	6–3	4–2		1–4	2–4	2–2	1–2	1–3	5–0	1–2	4–1
IF Elfsborg	2–1	1–2	0–2	3–0		3–2	2–1	3–0	3–0	5–2	3–3	1–1
IFK Göteborg	4–1	0–2	7–1	3–3	5–5		3–0	2–3	2–3	3–1	2–6	3–3
IFK Malmö	0–0	2–2	4–0	1–2	3–1	1–0		1–0	1–0	2–0	0–0	0–1
IFK Norrköping	6–0	3–0	0–1	4–0	5–1	3–1	0–0		0–1	5–1	2–1	4–2
Malmö FF	6–2	2–0	1–0	1–1	0–2	0–3	1–0	2–2		1–3	2–4	1–5
Sandvikens IF	0–1	0–1	1–1	1–2	0–1	2–3	0–1	3–6	3–1		2–2	2–1
Örebro SK	2–0	2–0	2–3	3–1	2–3	0–2	1–1	2–2	1–1	1–1		2–0
Örgryte IS	0–0	0–1	2–4	0–0	1–2	3–5	5–3	2–0	1–2	2–1	2–1	

Legend: Blue = home team win; Yellow = draw; Red = away team win.

== Attendances ==
#	Club	Average	Highest
1	IFK Göteborg	19,959	47,734
2	Örgryte IS	15,470	36,573
3	IF Elfsborg	14,608	22,654
4	AIK	13,134	20,355
5	Hammarby IF	12,137	28,992
6	Örebro SK	10,792	20,066
7	IFK Norrköping	10,500	20,012
8	Malmö FF	10,483	18,306
9	IFK Malmö	9,940	21,251
10	Hälsingborgs IF	9,654	15,042
11	Degerfors IF	7,401	16,537
12	Sandvikens IF	6,037	9,371
