= 1962 Allsvenskan =

38th season of Allsvenskan

Allsvenskan
- Season: 1962
- Champions: IFK Norrköping
- Relegated: IFK Malmö; Högadals IS
- European Cup: IFK Norrköping
- Top goalscorer: Leif Skiöld, Djurgårdens IF (21)
- Average attendance: 10,907

Statistics of Allsvenskan in season 1962.

== Overview ==
The league was contested by 12 teams, with IFK Norrköping winning the championship.

== League table ==
Pos	Team	Pld	W	D	L	GF	GA	GD	Pts	Qualification or relegation
1	IFK Norrköping (C)	22	14	4	4	39	19	+20	32	Qualification to European Cup preliminary round (Note: IFK Norrköping qualified for the European Cup as Allsvenskan leaders in the spring of 1962.)
2	Djurgårdens IF	22	11	8	3	51	19	+32	30	
3	IFK Göteborg	22	10	4	8	46	32	+14	24	
4	Örgryte IS	22	9	6	7	38	28	+10	24	
5	Hälsingborgs IF	22	11	2	9	37	38	−1	24	
6	Örebro SK	22	8	7	7	26	28	−2	23	
7	IF Elfsborg	22	9	4	9	37	37	0	22	
8	Malmö FF	22	9	4	9	32	40	−8	22	
9	Hammarby IF	22	8	4	10	32	43	−11	20	
10	Degerfors IF	22	7	4	11	33	35	−2	18	
11	IFK Malmö (R)	22	7	2	13	21	41	−20	16	Relegation to Division 2
12	Högadal (R)	22	3	3	16	24	56	−32	9	Relegation to Division 2

Rules for classification: 1) points; 2) goal difference; 3) number of goals scored.
(C) Champions; (R) Relegated

== Results ==
Home \ Away	DEG	DJU	HAIF	HÄIF	HIS	IFE	IFKG	IFKM	IFKN	MFF	ÖSK	ÖIS
Degerfors IF		0–3	1–2	5–0	4–1	0–2	0–2	2–1	4–0	5–1	1–2	3–2
Djurgårdens IF	0–0		1–1	2–2	3–0	0–1	0–0	6–0	0–0	2–0	0–1	4–1
Hammarby IF	1–1	2–4		1–3	2–1	3–0	3–2	0–0	0–2	5–2	1–0	3–1
Hälsingborgs IF	1–0	2–3	2–0		2–1	2–0	2–1	5–2	1–3	1–3	2–1	2–1
Högadals IS	2–1	1–3	2–1	0–2		1–6	4–7	0–1	1–2	2–2	1–5	1–3
IF Elfsborg	3–2	2–2	4–2	2–1	2–0		1–1	2–1	1–2	0–2	3–4	2–2
IFK Göteborg	4–0	2–8	6–1	2–1	2–0	3–1		2–1	1–2	1–2	5–0	1–2
IFK Malmö	1–2	0–4	1–0	1–3	1–2	1–0	0–2		2–0	1–2	2–2	3–2
IFK Norrköping	4–0	2–0	5–0	2–2	1–0	2–0	1–0	4–0		1–0	3–0	0–2
Malmö FF	1–0	0–4	0–3	2–0	3–3	5–3	1–1	0–1	1–1		1–2	0–3
Örebro SK	1–1	1–1	0–0	2–1	1–1	0–1	0–0	1–0	3–1	0–2		0–1
Örgryte IS	1–1	1–1	5–1	4–0	2–0	1–1	2–1	0–1	1–1	1–2	0–0	

Legend: Blue = home team win; Yellow = draw; Red = away team win.

== Attendances ==
#	Club	Average	Highest
1	IFK Göteborg	18,924	36,204
2	Djurgårdens IF	16,264	47,811
3	Örgryte IS	13,689	26,057
4	IFK Norrköping	13,090	26,791
5	IF Elfsborg	11,525	20,131
6	Hammarby IF	11,072	19,730
7	Malmö FF	9,618	14,053
8	Hälsingborgs IF	9,513	14,430
9	Örebro SK	9,299	14,306
10	Degerfors IF	8,297	14,739
11	Högadals IS	7,023	12,423
12	IFK Malmö	6,958	14,719
