= IFK Malmö Fotboll =

Swedish football club

IFK Malmö
- Full name: Idrottsföreningen Kamraterna Malmö
- Nickname: Di gule (The Yellows)
- Founded: 23 April 1899; 127 years ago
- Ground: Heleneholms IP
- Capacity: 2,500
- Chairman: Sten Thynell
- Manager: Nils-Erik Persson
- League: Ettan Fotboll
- 2022: Ettan Södra, 16th of 16 (Relegated)
- Website: www.ifkmalmo.se
Home colours	Away colours

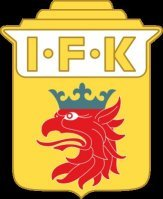
The original club symbol, with the Scanian griffin, from the king Erik of Pomerania.

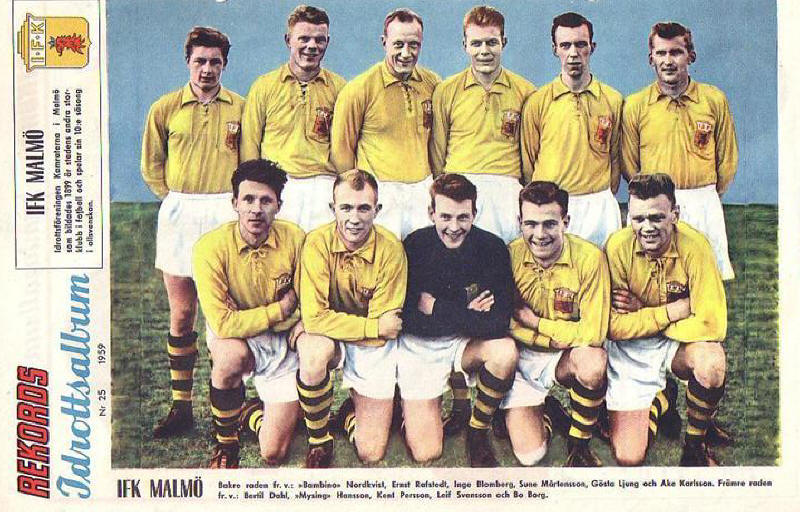
IFK during their heyday in 1959 shortly before playing a historic match against Real Madrid for a full house at the Santiago Bernabéu Stadium.

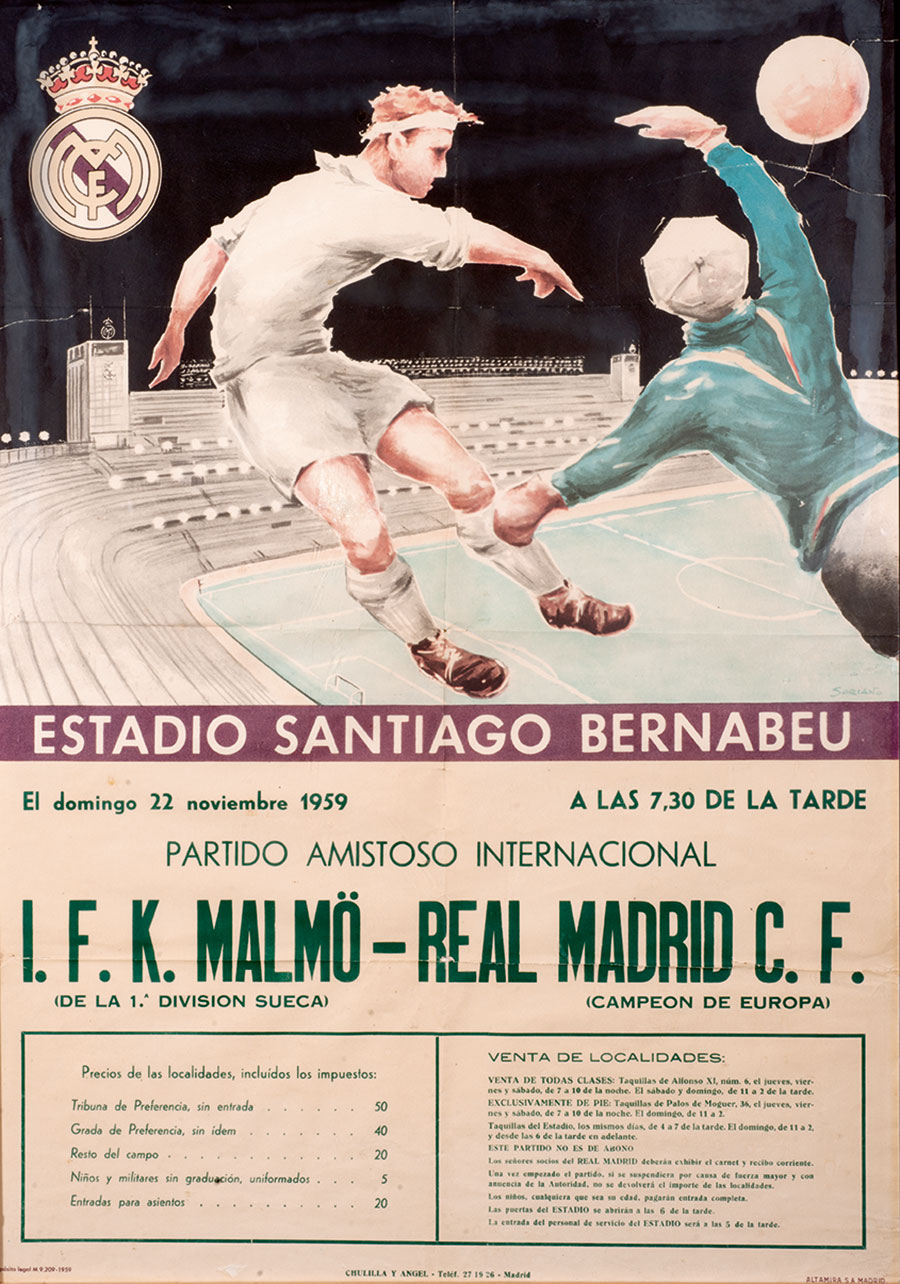
Di Gule (The Yellows) against Real Madrid in front of 40,000 spectators at Santiago Bernabéu Stadium (2–3) in 1959.

IFK Malmö football team is a section of Swedish sports club IFK Malmö based in Malmö. The club is affiliated with Skånes Fotbollförbund and play their home games at Malmö Stadion. The club colours, reflected in their crest and kit, are yellow, blue and white. But the original crest is only yellow (see below). Formed on 23 April 1899, the club have played thirteen seasons in Sweden's highest league Allsvenskan where they best finished as runners-up in 1960 and played their most recent season in 1962. IFK Malmö also reached the quarter-finals of the European Champions Cup in the 1960–61 season. The club is currently playing in Division 3 Södra Götaland, the 5th tier of Swedish football.

== History ==
The club was founded in 1899, making it the oldest football club in the city of Malmö. They participated in the first season of Allsvenskan in 1924/25. The club has altogether played 13 seasons in the premier division, in 1960 IFK finished second. In 1961, they made it to the quarter-finals of the European Cup (losing to Rapid Vienna). Before the 2009 season, the club switched their home stadium from Malmö IP to Malmö Stadion.

Historically, the club's main rivals are Malmö FF, although this rivalry has been toned down since the two clubs have not played in the same division for nearly 60 years. The club is affiliated with the Skånes Fotbollförbund.

== Kits ==
IFK Malmö is often colloquially called di gule (the yellow) in reference to their team colours. At the 1958 World Cup held in Sweden, the Argentina national football team wore IFK's home shirt because their rivals West Germany would not agree to use their alternative colours.

== Season to season ==
Season	Level	Division	Section	Position	Movements
1924–25	Tier 1	Allsvenskan		10th	
1925–26	Tier 1	Allsvenskan		11th	Relegated
1926–27	Tier 2	Division 2	Sydsvenska	5th	
1927–28	Tier 2	Division 2	Sydsvenska	1st	Promoted
1928–29	Tier 1	Allsvenskan		8th	
1929–30	Tier 1	Allsvenskan		10th	
1930–31	Tier 1	Allsvenskan		6th	
1931–32	Tier 1	Allsvenskan		11th	Relegated
1932–33	Tier 2	Division 2	Södra	3rd	
1933–34	Tier 2	Division 2	Södra	3rd	
1934–35	Tier 2	Division 2	Södra	3rd	
1935–36	Tier 2	Division 2	Södra	9th	Relegated
1936–37	Tier 3	Division 3	Sydsvenska	3rd	
1937–38	Tier 3	Division 3	Sydsvenska	1st	Promoted
1938–39	Tier 2	Division 2	Södra	7th	
1939–40	Tier 2	Division 2	Södra	7th	
1940–41	Tier 2	Division 2	Södra	6th	
1941–42	Tier 2	Division 2	Södra	8th	
1942–43	Tier 2	Division 2	Södra	4th	
1943–44	Tier 2	Division 2	Södra	7th	
1944–45	Tier 2	Division 2	Södra	5th	
1945–46	Tier 2	Division 2	Södra	3rd	
1946–47	Tier 2	Division 2	Södra	3rd	
1947–48	Tier 2	Division 2	Sydvästra	6th	
1948–49	Tier 2	Division 2	Sydvästra	2nd	
1949–50	Tier 2	Division 2	Sydvästra	8th	
1950–51	Tier 2	Division 2	Sydvästra	2nd	
1951–52	Tier 2	Division 2	Sydvästra	1st	Promoted
1952–53	Tier 1	Allsvenskan		12th	Relegated
1953–54	Tier 2	Division 2	Götaland	4th	
1954–55	Tier 2	Division 2	Götaland	2nd	
1955–56	Tier 2	Division 2	Östra Götaland	1st	Promotion Playoffs – Promoted
1956–57	Tier 1	Allsvenskan		10th	
1957–58	Tier 1	Allsvenskan		7th	
1959	Tier 1	Allsvenskan		9th	
1960	Tier 1	Allsvenskan		2nd	
1961	Tier 1	Allsvenskan		6th	
1962	Tier 1	Allsvenskan		11th	Relegated
1963	Tier 2	Division 2	Västra Götaland	2nd	
1964	Tier 2	Division 2	Västra Götaland	7th	
1965	Tier 2	Division 2	Västra Götaland	5th	
1966	Tier 2	Division 2	Södra Götaland	2nd	
1967	Tier 2	Division 2	Södra Götaland	4th	
1968	Tier 2	Division 2	Södra Götaland	7th	
1969	Tier 2	Division 2	Södra Götaland	2nd	
1970	Tier 2	Division 2	Södra Götaland	4th	
1971	Tier 2	Division 2	Södra Götaland	3rd	
1972	Tier 2	Division 2	Södra	7th	
1973	Tier 2	Division 2	Södra	8th	
1974	Tier 2	Division 2	Södra	4th	
1975	Tier 2	Division 2	Södra	10th	
1976	Tier 2	Division 2	Södra	7th	
1977	Tier 2	Division 2	Södra	11th	
1978	Tier 2	Division 2	Södra	8th	
1979	Tier 2	Division 2	Södra	7th	
1980	Tier 2	Division 2	Södra	3rd	
1981	Tier 2	Division 2	Södra	10th	Relegation Playoffs
1982	Tier 2	Division 2	Södra	8th	
1983	Tier 2	Division 2	Södra	2nd	Promotion Playoffs
1984	Tier 2	Division 2	Södra	9th	
1985	Tier 2	Division 2	Södra	13th	Relegated
1986	Tier 3	Division 3	Skåne	3rd	Promoted
1987*	Tier 3	Division 2	Östra	12th	Relegated
1988	Tier 4	Division 3	Södra Götaland	12th	Relegated
1989	Tier 5	Division 4	Sydvästra	2nd	
1990	Tier 5	Division 4	Sydvästra	1st	Promoted
1991	Tier 4	Division 3	Södra Götaland	4th	
1992	Tier 4	Division 3	Södra Götaland B	1st	Vårserier (Spring Series)
	Tier 4	Division 3	Södra Götaland	8th	Höstserier (Autumn Series)
1993	Tier 4	Division 3	Södra Götaland	1st	Promoted
1994	Tier 3	Division 2	Södra Götaland	2nd	Promotion Playoffs
1995	Tier 3	Division 2	Södra Götaland	3rd	
1996	Tier 3	Division 2	Södra Götaland	1st	Promoted
1997	Tier 2	Division 1	Södra	13th	Relegated
1998	Tier 3	Division 2	Södra Götaland	2nd	Promotion Playoffs
1999	Tier 3	Division 2	Södra Götaland	7th	
2000	Tier 3	Division 2	Södra Götaland	1st	Promoted
2001	Tier 2	Superettan		11th	
2002	Tier 2	Superettan		7th	
2003	Tier 2	Superettan		14th	Relegated
2004	Tier 3	Division 2	Södra Götaland	8th	
2005	Tier 3	Division 2	Södra Götaland	10th	
2006**	Tier 4	Division 2	Södra Götaland	1st	Promoted
2007	Tier 3	Division 1	Södra	4th	
2008	Tier 3	Division 1	Södra	12th	Relegated
2009	Tier 4	Division 2	Södra Götaland	11th	Relegated
2010	Tier 5	Division 3	Södra Götaland	9th	Relegation Playoffs – Relegated
2011	Tier 6	Division 4	Skåne Sydvästra	8th	
2012	Tier 6	Division 4	Skåne Sydvästra	8th	
2013	Tier 6	Division 4	Skåne Södra	1st	Promoted
2014	Tier 5	Division 3	Södra Götaland	2nd	Promotion Playoffs – Promoted
2015	Tier 4	Division 2	Södra Götaland	11th	
2016	Tier 4	Division 2	Södra Götaland	10th	
2017	Tier 4	Division 2	Östra Götaland	6th	
2018	Tier 4	Division 2	Västra Götaland	3rd	
2019	Tier 4	Division 2	Västra Götaland	12th	Relegation Playoffs -
2020	Tier 4	Division 2	Västra Götaland	1st	Promoted
2021	Tier 3	Ettan	Södra	11th	
2022	Tier 3	Ettan	Södra	16th	Relegated
2023	Tier 4	Division 2	Södra Götaland		Relegated
2024	Tier 5	Division 3			

* League restructuring in 1987 resulted in Division 1 being created at Tier 2 and subsequent divisions dropping a level.
** League restructuring in 2006 resulted in a new division being created at Tier 3 and subsequent divisions dropping a level.

== Attendances ==
In recent seasons IFK Malmö have had the following average attendances:

Season	Average attendance	Division / Section	Level
2001	2,294	Superettan	Tier 2
2002	1,876	Superettan	Tier 2
2003	1,736	Superettan	Tier 2
2004	1,632	Div 2 Södra Götaland	Tier 3
2005	966	Div 2 Södra Götaland	Tier 3
2006	664	Div 2 Södra Götaland	Tier 4
2007	678	Div 1 Södra	Tier 3
2008	584	Div 1 Södra	Tier 3
2009	366	Div 2 Södra Götaland	Tier 4
2010	220	Div 3 Södra Götaland	Tier 5
2011	256	Div 4 Skåne Sydvästra	Tier 6
2012	204	Div 4 Skåne Sydvästra	Tier 6
2013	228	Div 4 Skåne Södra	Tier 6
2014	204	Div 3 Södra Götaland	Tier 5
2015	258	Div 2 Södra Götaland	Tier 4
2016	172	Div 2 Södra Götaland	Tier 4
2017	218	Div 2 Södra Götaland	Tier 4
2018	232	Div 2 Södra Götaland	Tier 4
2019	?	Div 2 Södra Götaland	Tier 4
2020	0	Div 2 Södra Götaland	Tier 4
2021	117	Ettan Södra	Tier 3

* Attendances are provided in the Publikliga sections of the Svenska Fotbollförbundet website and European Football Statistics website.

== Technical staff ==
Name	Role
(Sweden) Yacine Hamoucha	Manager
(Sweden) Niklas Nilsson	Assistant Manager
(Sweden) Rickard Fors	Assistant Manager
(Sweden) Goran Jovanovic	Goalkeeping Coach

== Achievements ==
- Allsvenskan: runners-up 1960
- Division 2 Södra Götaland: 2006
- Division 2 Västra Götaland: 2020
