= IK Sleipner =

Swedish football club

- Full name: Idrottsklubben Sleipner
- Nickname: Randigt
- Founded: 1903
- Ground: Nya Parken, Norrköping; Sweden
- Capacity: 17,234
- Chairman: Anders Nobrant
- Manager: Wisam Al-Ezzi
- Coach: Robert Axelsson
- League: Division 2 Södra Svealand
- 2026: Division 2 Södra Svealand, 2nd
| Home colours | Away colours |

Idrottsklubben Sleipner is a sports club in Norrköping, Sweden; the main sports are football and ten-pin bowling. It was founded in 1903, and named after the deity Odin's horse Sleipnir from Norse mythology. Currently, the club's senior men's team plays football in Division 2. They are mostly known for winning Allsvenskan in 1938, but have since been overshadowed by local rivals IFK Norrköping both locally and nationally. The rivalry in beginning 1900 up until 1950 was often fierce as IK Sleipner was the workingclass team whilst IFK Norrköping came from the academical class. The club is affiliated to the Östergötlands Fotbollförbund. In the early 20th Century, the club also played bandy.

== Achievements ==
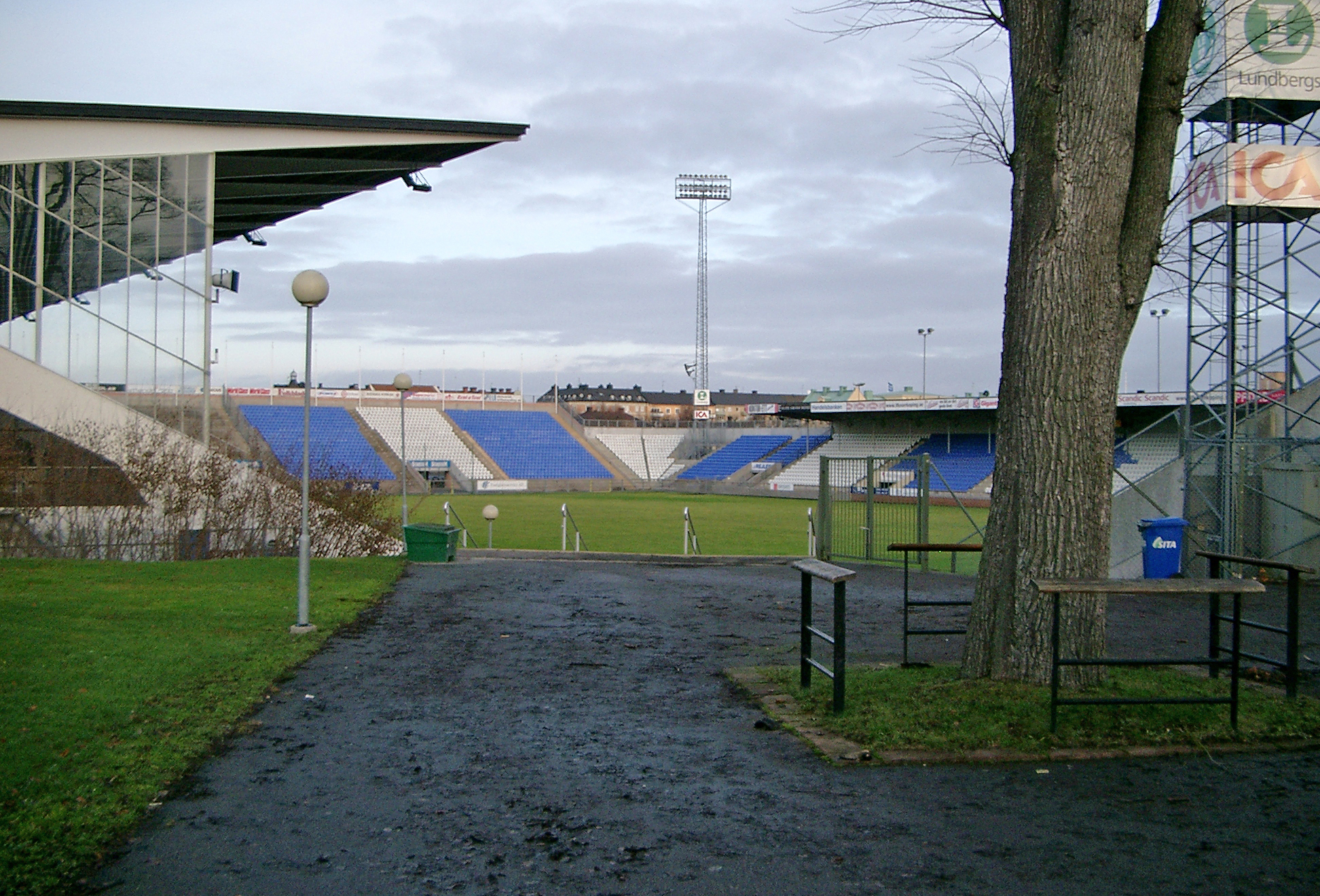
Norrköpings Idrottspark.

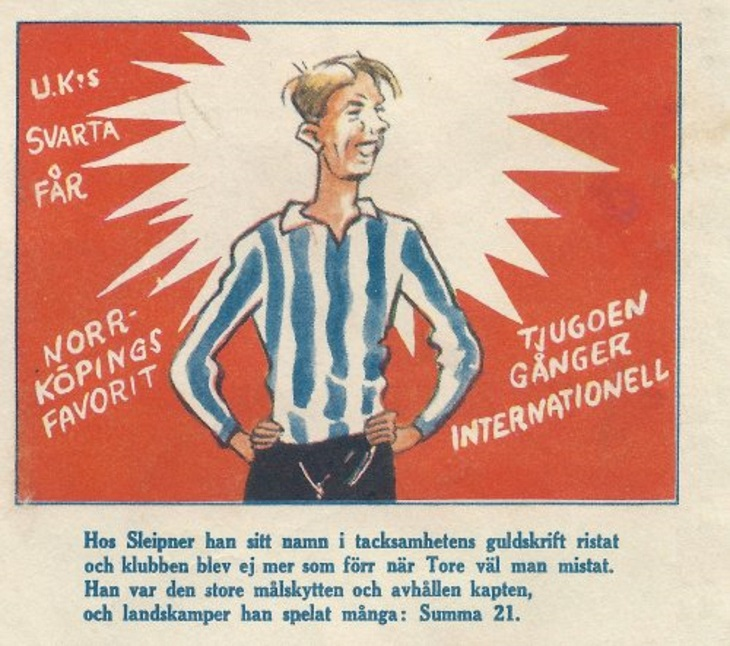
Sleipner legend Tore Keller in the classic match kit, blue and white striped shirts and black shorts, in Rekordmagasinet 1946.

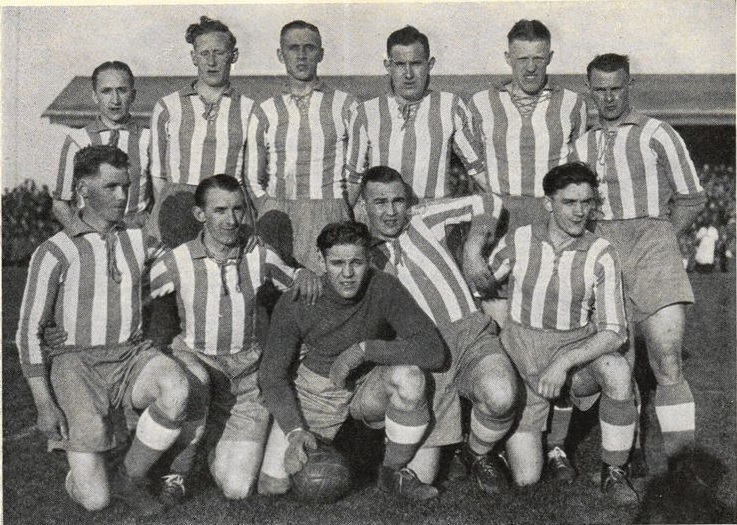
IK Sleipner, Swedish champion in football in 1938, standing from left: Hilding Sköld, Arne Linderholm, Tore Keller (captain), Harry Andersson, Gustaf Wetterström and Kurt Hjelm; kneeling Sven Unger, Roland Hjelm, Allan Johansson, Karl Johansson and Bernt Öhrström.

- Swedish Champions^{[A]}
  - Winners (1): 1937–38

=== League ===
- Allsvenskan
  - Winners (1): 1937–38
  - Runners-up (1): 1936–37
- Division 2 Östra
  - Winners (1): 1933–34
  - Runners-up (1): 1943–44
- Division 3 Östra
  - Winners (1): 1952–53
  - Runners-up (2): 1950–51, 1951–52
- Division 3 Nordöstra Götaland
  - Winners (4): 1961, 1967, 1978, 2021
- Division 4 Östergötland Östra
  - Winners (1): 1965

=== Cups ===
- Svenska Cupen
  - Runners-up (1): 1941
- Svenska Mästerskapet:
  - Runners-up (2): 1920, 1921

== Season to season ==
| Season | Level | Division | Section | Position | Movements |
|---|---|---|---|---|---|
| 1924–25 | Tier 1 | Allsvenskan | | 7th | |
| 1925–26 | Tier 1 | Allsvenskan | | 8th | |
| 1926–27 | Tier 1 | Allsvenskan | | 6th | |
| 1927–28 | Tier 1 | Allsvenskan | | 6th | |
| 1928–29 | Tier 1 | Allsvenskan | | 4th | |
| 1929–30 | Tier 1 | Allsvenskan | | 3rd | |
| 1930–31 | Tier 1 | Allsvenskan | | 8th | |
| 1931–32 | Tier 1 | Allsvenskan | | 6th | |
| 1932–33 | Tier 1 | Allsvenskan | | 11th | Relegated |
| 1933–34 | Tier 2 | Division 2 | Östra | 1st | Promoted |
| 1934–35 | Tier 1 | Allsvenskan | | 7th | |
| 1935–36 | Tier 1 | Allsvenskan | | 8th | |
| 1936–37 | Tier 1 | Allsvenskan | | 2nd | Runners Up |
| 1937–38 | Tier 1 | Allsvenskan | | 1st | Champions |
| 1938–39 | Tier 1 | Allsvenskan | | 7th | |
| 1939–40 | Tier 1 | Allsvenskan | | 8th | |
| 1940–41 | Tier 1 | Allsvenskan | | 12th | Relegated |
| 1941-42 | Tier 2 | Division 2 | Östra | 3rd | |
| 1942-43 | Tier 2 | Division 2 | Östra | 7th | |
| 1943-44 | Tier 2 | Division 2 | Östra | 2nd | |
| 1944-45 | Tier 2 | Division 2 | Östra | 5th | |
| 1945-46 | Tier 2 | Division 2 | Östra | 3rd | |
| 1946-47 | Tier 2 | Division 2 | Östra | 3rd | |
| 1947-48 | Tier 2 | Division 2 | Nordöstra | 8th | |
| 1948-49 | Tier 2 | Division 2 | Nordöstra | 4th | |
| 1949-50 | Tier 2 | Division 2 | Sydvästra | 10th | Relegated |
| 1950–51 | Tier 3 | Division 3 | Östra | 2nd | |
| 1951–52 | Tier 3 | Division 3 | Östra | 2nd | |
| 1952–53 | Tier 3 | Division 3 | Östra | 1st | Promoted |
| 1953-54 | Tier 2 | Division 2 | Götaland | 2nd | |
| 1954-55 | Tier 2 | Division 2 | Götaland | 12th | |
| 1955-56 | Tier 2 | Division 2 | Östra Götaland | 5th | |
| 1956-57 | Tier 2 | Division 2 | Östra Götaland | 5th | |
| 1957-58 | Tier 2 | Division 2 | Östra Götaland | 5th | |
| 1959 | Tier 2 | Division 2 | Östra Götaland | 6th | |
| 1960 | Tier 2 | Division 2 | Östra Götaland | 11th | Relegated |
| 1961 | Tier 3 | Division 3 | Nordöstra Götaland | 1st | Promoted |
| 1962 | Tier 2 | Division 2 | Östra Götaland | 11th | Relegated |
| 1963 | Tier 3 | Division 3 | Nordöstra Götaland | 5th | |
| 1964 | Tier 3 | Division 3 | Nordöstra Götaland | 10th | Relegated |
| 1965 | Tier 4 | Division 4 | Östergötland Östra | 1st | Promoted |
| 1966 | Tier 3 | Division 3 | Nordöstra Götaland | 4th | |
| 1967 | Tier 3 | Division 3 | Nordöstra Götaland | 1st | Promoted |
| 1968 | Tier 2 | Division 2 | Norra Götaland | 5th | |
| 1969 | Tier 2 | Division 2 | Norra Götaland | 5th | |
| 1970 | Tier 2 | Division 2 | Svealand | 6th | |
| 1971 | Tier 2 | Division 2 | Svealand | 3rd | |
| 1972 | Tier 2 | Division 2 | Mellersta | 7th | |
| 1973 | Tier 2 | Division 2 | Södra | 11th | |
| 1974 | Tier 2 | Division 2 | Norra | 4th | |
| 1975 | Tier 2 | Division 2 | Norra | 8th | |
| 1976 | Tier 2 | Division 2 | Norra | 6th | |
| 1977 | Tier 2 | Division 2 | Norra | 12th | Relegated |
| 1978 | Tier 3 | Division 3 | Nordöstra Götaland | 1st | Promoted |
| 1979 | Tier 2 | Division 2 | Södra | 8th | |
| 1980 | Tier 2 | Division 2 | Södra | 11th | |
| 1981 | Tier 2 | Division 2 | Södra | 9th | |
| 1982 | Tier 2 | Division 2 | Södra | 12th | Relegated |
| 1983 | Tier 3 | Division 3 | Nordöstra Götaland | 3rd | |
| 1984 | Tier 3 | Division 3 | Nordöstra Götaland | 8th | |
| 1985 | Tier 3 | Division 3 | Nordöstra Götaland | 4th | |
| 1986 | Tier 3 | Division 3 | Nordöstra Götaland | 7th | Relegated |
| 1987 | Tier 4 | Division 3 | Nordöstra Götaland | 7th | |
| 1988 | Tier 4 | Division 3 | Nordöstra Götaland | 1st | Promoted |
| 1989 | Tier 3 | Division 2 | Östra | 2nd | |
| 1990 | Tier 3 | Division 2 | Östra | 8th | |
| 1991 | Tier 3 | Division 2 | Mellersta | 1st | Spring Promoted |
| 1991 | Tier 2 | Division 1 | Östra | 7th | Autumn - Relegated |
| 1992 | Tier 3 | Division 3 | Östra Götaland | 1st | Spring Promoted |
| 1991 | Tier 2 | Division 1 | Västra | 8th | Autumn - Relegated |
| 1993 | Tier 3 | Division 2 | Östra Götaland | 1st | Promoted |
| 1994 | Tier 2 | Division 1 | Södra | 13th | Relegated |
| 1995 | Tier 3 | Division 2 | Östra Götaland | 7th | |
| 1996 | Tier 3 | Division 2 | Östra Götaland | 4th | |
| 1997 | Tier 3 | Division 2 | Östra Götaland | 12th | Relegated |
| 1998 | Tier 4 | Division 3 | Nordöstra Götaland | 1st | Promoted |
| 1999 | Tier 3 | Division 2 | Östra Götaland | 6th | |
| 2000 | Tier 3 | Division 2 | Östra Götaland | 6th | |
| 2001 | Tier 3 | Division 2 | Västra Svealand | 5th | |
| 2002 | Tier 3 | Division 2 | Västra Svealand | 1st | |
| 2003 | Tier 3 | Division 2 | Östra Svealand | 6th | |
| 2004 | Tier 3 | Division 2 | Östra Götaland | 4th | |
| 2005 | Tier 3 | Division 2 | Östra Svealand | 5th | Promotion Playoffs |
| 2006 | Tier 4 | Division 2 | Mellersta Götaland | 2nd | |
| 2007 | Tier 4 | Division 2 | Mellersta Götaland | 2nd | |
| 2008 | Tier 4 | Division 2 | Östra Götaland | 1st | Promoted |
| 2009 | Tier 3 | Division 1 | Södra | 3rd | |
| 2010 | Tier 3 | Division 1 | Södra | 4th | |
| 2011 | Tier 3 | Division 1 | Södra | 7th | |
| 2012 | Tier 3 | Division 1 | Södra | 12th | Relegated |
| 2013 | Tier 4 | Division 2 | Södra Svealand | 3rd | |
| 2014 | Tier 4 | Division 2 | Södra Svealand | 2nd | |
| 2015 | Tier 4 | Division 2 | Södra Svealand | 1st | Promoted |
| 2016 | Tier 3 | Division 1 | Södra | 14th | Relegated |
| 2017 | Tier 4 | Division 2 | Södra Svealand | 3rd | |
| 2018 | Tier 4 | Division 2 | Södra Svealand | 12th | Relegation Playoffs - Relegated |
| 2019 | Tier 5 | Division 3 | Nordöstra Götaland | 8th | |
| 2020 | Tier 5 | Division 3 | Nordöstra Götaland | 5th | |
| 2021 | Tier 5 | Division 3 | Nordöstra Götaland | 1st | Promoted |
| 2022 | Tier 4 | Division 2 | Södra Svealand | 7th | |
| 2023 | Tier 4 | Division 2 | Södra Svealand | 2nd | Promotion Playoffs |
| 2024 | Tier 4 | Division 2 | Södra Svealand | 8th | |
| 2025 | Tier 4 | Division 2 | Södra Svealand | 4th | |

* League restructuring in 2006 resulted in a new division being created at Tier 3 and subsequent divisions dropping a level.

== Current squad ==
As of 26 January 2023

Note: Flags indicate national team as defined under FIFA eligibility rules; some limited exceptions apply. Players may hold more than one non-FIFA nationality.

| No. | Pos. | Nation | Player |
|---|---|---|---|
| 1 | GK | SWE | Edvard Setterberg |
| 3 | DF | SWE | Alexander Contreras Dinamarca |
| 4 | DF | SWE | Benjamin Omerovic |
| 5 | DF | SWE | Jonathan Larsson |
| 6 | DF | SWE | Gabriel Lahdo |
| 16 | DF | SWE | Hadar Sundberg |
| 17 | DF | SWE | Nils Akai Rosell |
| 20 | DF | SWE | Johan Andersson |
| 22 | DF | SWE | Goran Hadziahmetovic |
| 2 | MF | SWE | Ezquiel Lucas |
| 8 | MF | SWE | Srdjan Sotra |
| 10 | MF | SWE | Buster Blasse |
| 12 | MF | SWE | Ahmed Al-Ezzi |
| 18 | MF | SWE | Khaled Qasem |
| 21 | MF | SWE | Daniel Liljeqvist |
| 24 | MF | SWE | Maximilian Malm |
| 34 | MF | SWE | Arber Abazi |
| 7 | FW | SWE | Casper Frisk |
| 9 | FW | SWE | Albert Johansson |
| 11 | FW | SWE | Jonathan Gren |
| 80 | FW | SWE | Eldin Ibrahimbegovic |

== Attendances ==
In recent seasons IK Sleipner have had the following average attendances:

| Season | Average attendance | Division / Section | Level |
|---|---|---|---|
| 2005 | 435 | Div 2 Östra Svealand | Tier 3 |
| 2006 | 243 | Div 2 Mellersta Götaland | Tier 4 |
| 2007 | 302 | Div 2 Mellersta Götaland | Tier 4 |
| 2008 | 377 | Div 2 Östra Götaland | Tier 4 |
| 2009 | 680 | Div 1 Södra | Tier 3 |
| 2010 | 358 | Div 1 Södra | Tier 3 |
| 2011 | 332 | Div 1 Södra | Tier 3 |
| 2012 | 225 | Div 1 Södra | Tier 3 |
| 2013 | 193 | Div 2 Södra Svealand | Tier 4 |
| 2014 | 221 | Div 2 Södra Svealand | Tier 4 |
| 2015 | 243 | Div 2 Södra Svealand | Tier 4 |
| 2016 | 172 | Div 1 Norra | Tier 3 |
| 2017 | 201 | Div 2 Södra Svealand | Tier 4 |
| 2018 | ? | Div 2 Södra Svealand | Tier 4 |
| 2019 | ? | Div 3 Nordöstra Götaland | Tier 5 |
| 2020 | ? | Div 3 Nordöstra Götaland | Tier 5 |
| 2021 | ? | Div 3 Nordöstra Götaland | Tier 5 |

* Attendances are provided in the Publikliga sections of the Svenska Fotbollförbundet website.

== Footnotes ==
A. The title of "Swedish Champions" has been awarded to the winner of four different competitions over the years. Between 1896 and 1925 the title was awarded to the winner of Svenska Mästerskapet, a stand-alone cup tournament. No club were given the title between 1926 and 1930 even though the first-tier league Allsvenskan was played. In 1931 the title was reinstated and awarded to the winner of Allsvenskan. Between 1982 and 1990 a play-off in cup format was held at the end of the league season to decide the champions. After the play-off format in 1991 and 1992 the title was decided by the winner of Mästerskapsserien, an additional league after the end of Allsvenskan. Since the 1993 season the title has once again been awarded to the winner of Allsvenskan.
