= Västerås IK Fotboll =

Swedish football club

- Full name: Västerås Idrottsklubb
- Founded: 6 januari 1913
- Stadium: Apalby IP
- League: Division 3 Norra Svealand
- Website: http://www.vik-fotboll.com/
Home colours	Away colours

Västerås IK Fotboll is a Swedish football club located in Västerås.

== Background ==
Since their foundation in 1913, Västerås IK has participated mainly in the middle divisions of the Swedish football league system. Their peak came early in the club's history when Västerås IK competed in the inaugural 1924–25 Allsvenskan season. The club's stay in the top tier was short-lived, however, and they were relegated at the end of the season having won only two games. As of the 2014 season, the club plays in Division 2 Norra Svealand, which is the fourth tier of Swedish football. They play their home matches at the Apalby IP in Västerås.

Västerås IK are affiliated to the Västmanlands Fotbollförbund.

== Season to season ==
In their early seasons Västerås IK competed in the following divisions:

Season	Level	Division	Group	Position	Movements
1924–25	Tier 1	Allsvenskan		11th	Relegated
1925–26	Tier 2	Division 2	Mellansvenska Serien	3rd	
1926–27	Tier 2	Division 2	Mellansvenska Serien	3rd	
1927–28	Tier 2	Division 2	Mellansvenska Serien	9th	Relegated
1928–29	Tier 3	Division 3	Mellansvenska	8th	
1929–30	Tier 3	Division 3	Mellansvenska	11th	Relegated

In recent seasons Västerås IK Fotboll have competed in the following divisions:

Season	Level	Division	Group	Position	Movements
1993	Tier 4	Division 3	Västra Svealand	12th	Relegated
1994	Tier 5	Division 4	Västmanland	2nd	Promotion Playoffs
1995	Tier 5	Division 4	Västmanland	1st	Promoted
1996	Tier 4	Division 3	Västra Svealand	10th	Relegated
1997	Tier 5	Division 4	Västmanland	1st	Promoted
1998	Tier 4	Division 3	Norra Svealand	2nd	Promotion playoff
1999	Tier 4	Division 3	Norra Svealand	11th	Relegated
2000	Tier 5	Division 4	Västmanland	2nd	Promotion playoff – promoted
2001	Tier 4	Division 3	Västra Svealand	4th	
2002	Tier 4	Division 3	Västra Svealand	5th	
2003	Tier 4	Division 3	Västra Svealand	1st	Promoted
2004	Tier 3	Division 2	Västra Svealand	9th	
2005	Tier 3	Division 2	Norra Svealand	6th	
2006*	Tier 4	Division 2	Norra Svealand	5th	
2007	Tier 4	Division 2	Norra Svealand	5th	
2008	Tier 4	Division 2	Norra Svealand	8th	
2009	Tier 4	Division 2	Norra Svealand	5th	
2010	Tier 4	Division 2	Norra Svealand	10th	Relegation playoff
2011	Tier 4	Division 2	Norra Svealand	6th	
2012	Tier 4	Division 2	Norra Svealand	3rd	
2013	Tier 4	Division 2	Norra Svealand	11th	Relegation playoff
2014	Tier 4	Division 2	Norra Svealand	10th	
2015	Tier 4	Division 2	Norra Svealand	9th	
2016	Tier 4	Division 2	Norra Svealand	14th	Relegated
2017	Tier 5	Division 3	Östra Svealand	7th	
2018	Tier 5	Division 3	Östra Svealand	6th	
2019	Tier 5	Division 3	Norra Svealand	10th	Relegated
2020	Tier 6	Division 4	Västmanland	1st	Promoted
2021	Tier 5	Division 3	Norra Svealand	8th	

* League restructuring in 2006 resulted in a new division being created at Tier 3 and subsequent divisions dropping a level.

== Attendances ==
In recent seasons Västerås IK Fotboll have had the following average attendances:

Season	Average attendance	Division / Section	Level
2005	187	Div. 2 Norra Svealand	Tier 3
2006	242	Div. 2 Norra Svealand	Tier 4
2007	175	Div. 2 Norra Svealand	Tier 4
2008	177	Div. 2 Norra Svealand	Tier 4
2009	183	Div. 2 Norra Svealand	Tier 4
2010	141	Div. 2 Norra Svealand	Tier 4
2011	200	Div. 2 Norra Svealand	Tier 4
2012	119	Div. 2 Norra Svealand	Tier 4
2013	167	Div. 2 Norra Svealand	Tier 4
2014	120	Div. 2 Norra Svealand	Tier 4
2015	121	Div. 2 Norra Svealand	Tier 4
2016	122	Div. 2 Norra Svealand	Tier 5
2017	106	Div. 3 Östra Svealand	Tier 5
2018	153	Div. 3 Östra Svealand	Tier 5
2019	?	Div. 3 Norra Svealand	Tier 5

* Attendances are provided in the Publikliga sections of the Svenska Fotbollförbundet website.

The attendance record for Västerås IK was 3,924 spectators for the match against Sandvikens IF in Division 2 Norra on 16 September 1945.
