= Filip Johansson (footballer) =

Swedish footballer (1902–1976)

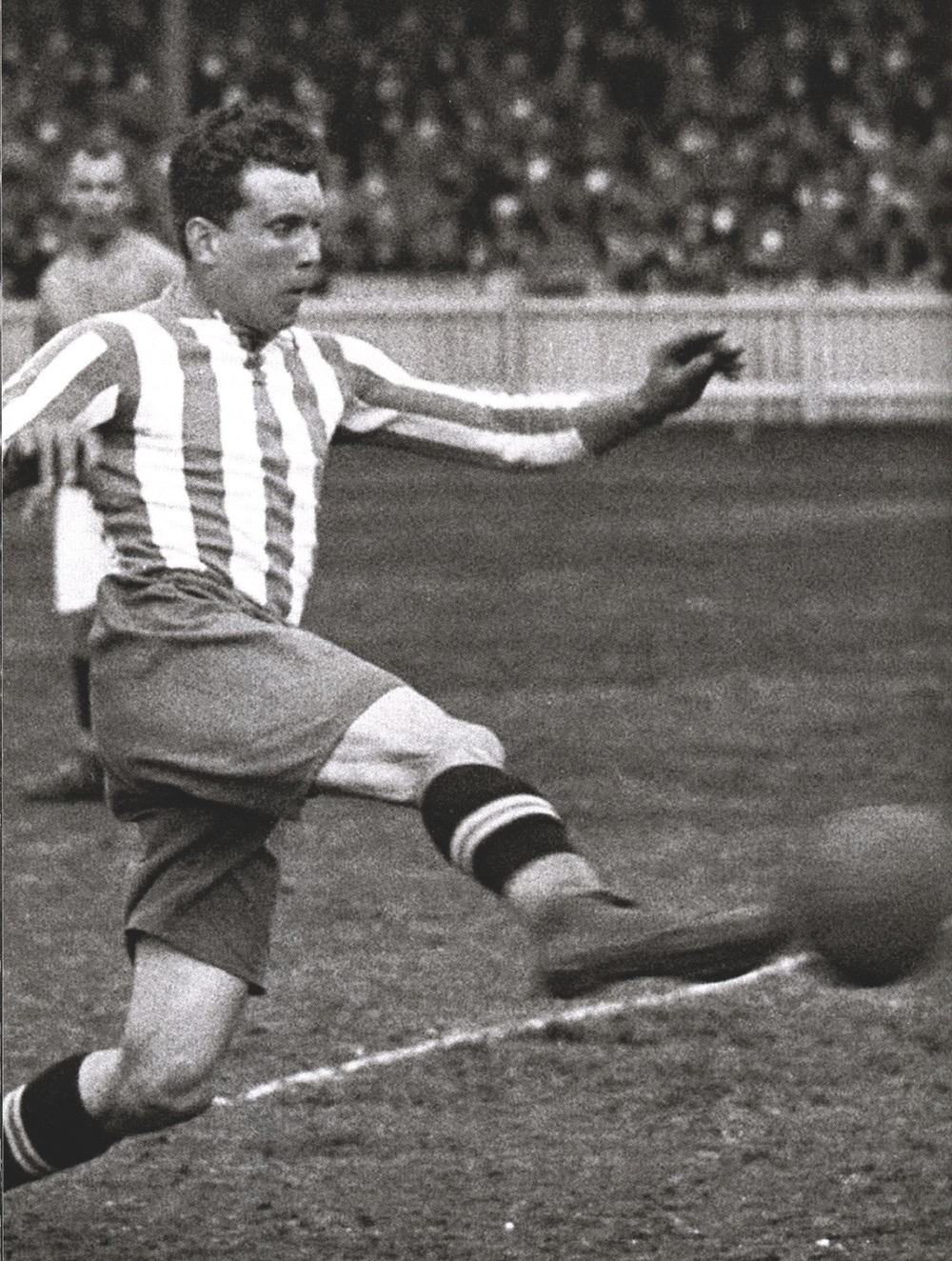
- Filip Johansson

Personal information
- Full name: John Filip Valter Johansson
- Date of birth: 21 January 1902
- Place of birth: Nödinge, Sweden
- Date of death: 1 November 1976 (aged 74)
- Place of death: Surte, Sweden
- Position: Forward

Youth career
- Surte IS

Senior career*
Years	Team	Apps	(Gls)
?–1924	Fässbergs IF		
1924–1933	IFK Göteborg	181	(180)
1935–1936	Gårda BK		

International career
1925–1930	Sweden	16	(14)
- * Club domestic league appearances and goals

John Filip Valter Johansson (21 January 1902 – 1 November 1976) was a Swedish footballer who played as a striker. He was born in Surte, north of Gothenburg. He was nicknamed Svarte-Filip, meaning Black-Filip, referring to the pitch-black colour of his hair. He also played bandy in Surte IS.

After starting his career playing for a local club, he also played for Fässbergs IF and Trollhättans IF before joining IFK Göteborg in 1924. He debuted in Allsvenskan the same year and set a record that season, scoring 39 goals in 21 matches. During his nine seasons in the club, he played 277 matches and scored 333 goals. He never won the Swedish Championships with the club, finishing second three times and third four times. He also played 16 matches for the Sweden national team, scoring 14 goals.

Johansson died in 1976. In northeast Gothenburg there is a street named after him, "Svarte Filips Gata".

== Clubs ==
- Surte IS, Fässbergs IF, Trollhättans IF (–1924)
- IFK Göteborg (1924–32)
- Gårda BK (1932–?)

== Sources ==
- The article is based upon the Swedish version, which in turn is based upon the article about the player on Gårda BK:s website. .
- Filip Johansson at EU-Football.info (archived)
