= Westermalms IF =

Swedish football club

- Full name: Westermalms Idrottsförening Fotbollklubb
- Founded: 1902
- Ground: Stadshagens IP, Stockholm, Sweden
- Chairman: Ludde Lundh
- Head coach: Tomas Jensing
- League: Division 7 – Stockholm
- 2021: Division 7 Stockholm D, 3rd
Home colours

Westermalms IF FK is a football club located in Stockholm, Sweden, that competed in the Allsvenskan for two seasons in the late 1920s. The club currently play eight tiers lower in Division 7 Stockholm D.

The original colours of the team were black and white striped shirts and blue shorts.

== History ==
Westermalms IF was founded on the Friday 1 August 1902 when 17 young people met at a café at Fleminggatan 62, Kungsholmen. The original name of the club was Idrottsklubben Friggs. Barely a decade later the club was already among the best football teams in Sweden, but without being able to win a title. Individual players such as Herbert Almqvist, Rune Bergström and Birger Carlsson were among a number of players at the club, who represented the Sweden national team. The team was well supported, with more than 15,000 attending a match against IFK Göteborg in the 1928/29 season.

The football team played two seasons in the Allsvenskan – in 1926–27 and 1928–29. The club also spent seven seasons in Division 2 in the 1920s and early 1930s. They won the Division 2 Östsvenska Serien on three occasions, the last time being in 1927–28.

In later years the fortunes of Westermalms IF FK plummeted and the club has remained entrenched in the lower divisions of the Swedish football league system. The club currently plays in Division 7 Stockholm D which is the ninth tier of Swedish football. They play their home matches at the Stadshagens IP in Stockholm.

Westermalms IF are affiliated to the Stockholms Fotbollförbund.

== Season to season ==
In their halcyon early seasons Westermalms IF competed in the following divisions:

| Season | Level | Division | Section | Position | Movements |
|---|---|---|---|---|---|
| 1924–25 | Tier 2 | Division 2 | Östsvenska Serien | 1st | Promotion Playoffs |
| 1925–26 | Tier 2 | Division 2 | Östsvenska Serien | 1st | Promotion Playoffs – Promoted |
| 1926–27 | Tier 1 | Allsvenskan | | 11th | Relegated |
| 1927–28 | Tier 2 | Division 2 | Östsvenska Serien | 1st | Promotion Playoffs |
| 1928–29 | Tier 1 | Allsvenskan | | 12th | Relegated |
| 1929–30 | Tier 2 | Division 2 | Norra | 7th | |
| 1930–31 | Tier 2 | Division 2 | Norra | 9th | |
| 1931–32 | Tier 2 | Division 2 | Norra | 9th | |
| 1932–33 | Tier 2 | Division 2 | Östra | 9th | Relegated |
| 1933–34 | Tier 3 | Division 3 | Östsvenska | 3rd | |
| 1934–35 | Tier 3 | Division 3 | Östsvenska | 7th | |
| 1935–36 | Tier 3 | Division 3 | Östsvenska | 9th | Relegated |

In recent seasons Westermalms IF have competed in the following divisions:

| Season | Level | Division | Section | Position | Movements |
|---|---|---|---|---|---|
| 1999 | Tier 8 | Division 7 | Stockholm D | 6th | |
| 2000 | Tier 8 | Division 7 | Stockholm D | 3rd | |
| 2001 | Tier 8 | Division 7 | Stockholm D | 8th | |
| 2002 | Tier 8 | Division 7 | Stockholm D | 8th | |
| 2003 | Tier 8 | Division 7 | Stockholm D | 4th | |
| 2004 | Tier 8 | Division 7 | Stockholm D | 6th | |
| 2005 | Tier 8 | Division 7 | Stockholm D | 2nd | |
| 2006* | Tier 8 | Division 6 | Stockholm B | 5th | |
| 2007 | Tier 8 | Division 6 | Stockholm B | 4th | |
| 2008 | Tier 8 | Division 6 | Stockholm A | 6th | |
| 2009 | Tier 8 | Division 6 | Stockholm C | 2nd | |
| 2010 | Tier 8 | Division 6 | Stockholm C | 4th | |
| 2011 | Tier 8 | Division 6 | Stockholm C | 2nd | |
| 2012 | Tier 8 | Division 6 | Stockholm C | 10th | Relegated |
| 2013 | Tier 9 | Division 7 | Stockholm F | 1st | Promoted |
| 2014 | Tier 8 | Division 6 | Stockholm C | 2nd | |
| 2015 | Tier 8 | Division 6 | Stockholm C | 5th | |
| 2016 | Tier 8 | Division 6 | Stockholm C | 9th | Relegated |
| 2017 | Tier 9 | Division 7 | Stockholm F | 2nd | Promotion Playoffs – Promoted |
| 2018 | Tier 8 | Division 6 | Stockholm E | 9th | Relegated |
| 2019 | Tier 9 | Division 7 | Stockholm D | 3rd | |
| 2020 | Tier 9 | Division 7 | Stockholm D | 4th | |
| 2021 | Tier 9 | Division 7 | Stockholm D | 3rd | |

* League restructuring in 2006 resulted in changes in divisions.
