= Fässbergs IF =

Swedish football club

- Full name: Fässbergs Idrottsförening
- Founded: 1916; 110 years ago
- Ground: Åbyvallen; Mölndal; Sweden
- Capacity: 6,000
- Chairman: Mats Milsta
- Head coach: Dane Ivarsson
- Coach: Fredrik Carlsson; Pierre Krantz; Niklas Sernevall
- League: Division 4 Göteborg B
- 2023: Division 5 Göteborg B, 2nd
Home colours

Fässbergs IF is a Swedish football club, founded in 1916. They are based in Mölndal, near Gothenburg. The team won the Svenska Mästerskapet in 1924.

== Background ==
Fässbergs IF was formed on 24 April 1916 by the Krokslätts IK, Mölndals IS and IK Celtic clubs. Historically, the first team has usually played in Division III and IV of the Swedish football league system. The club's greatest achievement was way back in 1924 when they won the Svenska Mästerskapet by beating IK Sirius 5–0 in the final. This was the last time that the Swedish Championship was played as a cup competition. The club were not permitted to join the Allsvenskan for 1924/25. The club currently plays in Division 4 Gothenburg B (2024), which is the sixth tier of Swedish football. They play their home matches at the Åbyvallen in Mölndal.

Fässbergs IF have approximately 500 members. The club are affiliated to the Göteborgs Fotbollförbund. Fässberg Parish covers most of the town of Mölndal.

== Season to season ==
Season	Level	Division	Section	Position	Movements
1993	Tier 5	Division 4	Göteborg A	1st	Promoted
1994	Tier 4	Division 3	Mellersta Götaland	4th	
1995	Tier 4	Division 3	Sydvästra Götaland	9th	Relegation Playoffs
1996	Tier 4	Division 3	Sydvästra Götaland	10th	Relegated
1997	Tier 5	Division 4	Göteborg B	9th	
1998	Tier 5	Division 4	Göteborg B	5th	
1999	Tier 5	Division 4	Göteborg B	3rd	
2000	Tier 5	Division 4	Göteborg B	3rd	
2001	Tier 5	Division 4	Göteborg B	6th	
2002	Tier 5	Division 4	Göteborg B	10th	
2003	Tier 5	Division 4	Göteborg B	3rd	
2004	Tier 5	Division 4	Göteborg B	1st	Promoted
2005	Tier 4	Division 3	Mellersta Götaland	6th	
2006*	Tier 5	Division 3	Mellersta Götaland	1st	Promoted
2007	Tier 4	Division 2	Västra Götaland	6th	
2008	Tier 4	Division 2	Västra Götaland	9th	
2009	Tier 4	Division 2	Västra Götaland	9th	
2010	Tier 4	Division 2	Södra Götaland	12th	Relegated
2011	Tier 5	Division 3	Nordvästra Götaland	2nd	Promotion Playoffs – Promoted
2012	Tier 4	Division 2	Västra Götaland	4th	
2013	Tier 4	Division 2	Västra Götaland	12th	Relegated
2014	Tier 5	Division 3	Sydvästra Götaland	10th	Relegated
2015	Tier 6	Division 4	Göteborg B	12th	Relegated
2016	Tier 7	Division 5	Göteborg B	11th	Relegated
2017	Tier 8	Division 6	Göteborg B	3rd	
2018	Tier 8	Division 6	Göteborg B	2nd	Promotion Playoffs – Promoted?
2019	Tier 7	Division 5	Göteborg B	10th	
2020	Tier 7	Division 5	Göteborg B	7th	
2021	Tier 7	Division 5	Göteborg B	3rd	
2022	Tier 7	Division 5	Göteborg B	4th	
2023	Tier 7	Division 5	Göteborg B	2nd	

* League restructuring in 2006 resulted in a new division being created at Tier 3 and subsequent divisions dropping a level.

== Attendances ==
In recent seasons Fässbergs IF have had the following average attendances:

Season	Average Attendance	Division / Section	Level
2005	83	Div 3 Mellersta Götaland	Tier 4
2006	82	Div 3 Mellersta Götaland	Tier 5
2007	179	Div 2 Västra Götaland	Tier 4
2008	142	Div 2 Västra Götaland	Tier 4
2009	135	Div 2 Västra Götaland	Tier 4
2010	108	Div 2 Södra Götaland	Tier 4
2011	116	Div 3 Nordvästra Götaland	Tier 5
2012	187	Div 2 Västra Götaland	Tier 4
2013	174	Div 2 Västra Götaland	Tier 4
2014	115	Div 3 Sydvästra Götaland	Tier 5
2015	233	Div 4 Göteborg B	Tier 6
2016	34	Div 5 Göteborg B	Tier 7
2017	37	Div 6 Göteborg B	Tier 8
2018	?	Div 6 Göteborg B	Tier 8
2019	?	Div 5 Göteborg B	Tier 7

* Attendances are provided in the Publikliga sections of the Svenska Fotbollförbundet website.

== Achievements ==
- Swedish Champions^{[A]}
  - Winners (1): 1924

=== Cups ===
- Svenska Mästerskapet:
  - Winners (1): 1924

== Footnotes ==
A. The title of "Swedish Champions" has been awarded to the winner of four different competitions over the years. Between 1896 and 1925 the title was awarded to the winner of Svenska Mästerskapet, a stand-alone cup tournament. No club were given the title between 1926 and 1930 even though the first-tier league Allsvenskan was played. In 1931 the title was reinstated and awarded to the winner of Allsvenskan. Between 1982 and 1990 a play-off in cup format was held at the end of the league season to decide the champions. After the play-off format in 1991 and 1992 the title was decided by the winner of Mästerskapsserien, an additional league after the end of Allsvenskan. Since the 1993 season the title has once again been awarded to the winner of Allsvenskan.
