= List of Allsvenskan stadiums =

This is a list of Allsvenskan stadiums.

== Stadiums ==
Stadiums listed in blue indicate that they are the home grounds of teams currently participating in the 2018 Allsvenskan season, while the stadiums listed in red have now been demolished.

| Stadium | Image | Club | Location | Opened | Closed | Capacity | Coordinates | Refs |
|---|---|---|---|---|---|---|---|---|
| Arosvallen | | Västerås SK | Västerås | 1932 | | 10,000 | | |
| Bårsta IP | | Assyriska FF | Södertälje | | | | | |
| Behrn Arena | | Örebro SK | Örebro | 1923 | | 14,500 | | |
| Borås Arena | | IF Elfsborg | Borås | 2005 | | 16,899 | | |
| Bravida Arena | | BK Häcken | Gothenburg | 2015 | | 6,500 | | |
| Domnarvsvallen | | IK Brage | Borlänge | 1925 | | 6,500 | | |
| Enavallen | | Enköpings SK | Enköping | 1934 | | 4,500 | | |
| Falkenbergs IP | | Falkenbergs FF | Falkenberg | 1921 | | 4,000 | | |
| Folkungavallen | | BK Derby, IF Saab | Linköping | 1919 | | 5,500 | | |
| Fredriksskans | | Kalmar FF | Kalmar | | | 9,000 | | |
| Strawberry Arena | | AIK | Solna | 2012 | | 50,000 | | |
| Gamla Ullevi (old) | | GAIS, Gårda BK, IFK Göteborg, Redbergslid, Örgryte IS | Gothenburg | 1916 | 2007 | 18,000 | | |
| Gamla Ullevi (new) | | GAIS, IFK Göteborg, BK Häcken, Örgryte IS | Gothenburg | 2009 | | 18,900 | | |
| Gavlevallen | | Dalkurd FF, Gefle IF | Gävle | 2015 | | 6,500 | | |
| Grimsta IP | | IF Brommapojkarna | Stockholm | 1963 | | 8,000 | | |
| Guldfågeln Arena | | Kalmar FF | Kalmar | 2011 | | 12,182 | | |
| Herrgärdets IP | | Västerås IK | Västerås | | | | | |
| Hillängens IP | | Ludvika FFI | Ludvika | | | | | |
| Hitachi Energy Arena | | Västerås SK | Västerås | 2008 | | 7,000 | | |
| Jernvallen | | Sandvikens AIK, Sandvikens IF | Sandviken | 1938 | | | | |
| Johanneshovs IP | | Hammarby IF | Stockholm | 1918 | 1967 | | | |
| Jämtkraft Arena | | Östersunds FK | Östersund | 2007 | | 8,466 | | |
| Kamratvallen | | IFK Holmsund | Holmsund | | | | | |
| Kopparvallen | | Åtvidabergs FF | Åtvidaberg | 1907 | | 8,000 | | |
| Landskrona IP | | Landskrona BoIS | Landskrona | 1924 | | | | |
| Lövåsvallen | | Billingsfors IK | Billingsfors | 1944 | | | | |
| Malmö IP | | IFK Malmö, Malmö FF | Malmö | 1896 | | | | |
| Malmö Stadion | | IFK Malmö, Malmö FF | Malmö | 1956 | | 26,500 | | |
| Motala Idrottspark | | Motala AIF | Motala | 1920 | | | | |
| Myresjöhus Arena | | Östers IF | Växjö | 2012 | | | | |
| Norra IP | | Sandvikens IF | Sandviken | | | | | |
| Norrporten Arena | | IFK Sundsvall, GIF Sundsvall | Sundsvall | 1903 | | | | |
| Nya Parken | | IFK Norrköping, IK Sleipner | Norrköping | 1904 | | 17,234 | | |
| Olympia | | Helsingborgs IF, Råå IF, Stattena IF | Helsingborg | 1898 | | 16,500 | | |
| Örjans Vall | | IS Halmia, Halmstads BK | Halmstad | 1922 | | 15,500 | | |
| Rambergsvallen | | BK Häcken | Gothenburg | 1935 | 2013 | 7,000 | | |
| Ramnavallen | | IF Elfsborg | Borås | 1922 | | 4,000 | | |
| Råsunda IP | | AIK | Solna | 1910 | 1937 | | | |
| Råsunda Stadium | | AIK, Djurgårdens IF, Reymersholms IK | Solna | 1937 | 2012 | 36,608 | | |
| Rimnersvallen | | IK Oddevold, IFK Uddevalla | Uddevalla | 1923 | | | | |
| Ruddalens IP | | Västra Frölunda IF | Gothenburg | 1983 | | 5,000 | | |
| Ryavallen | | IF Elfsborg, Norrby IF | Borås | 1941 | | | | |
| Sandåkerns IP | | Umeå FC | Umeå | | | | | |
| Skarsjövallen | | Ljungskile SK | Ljungskile | 1984 | | | | |
| Skogsvallen | | IFK Luleå | Luleå | | | 2,500 | | |
| Slottsskogsvallen | | GAIS, IFK Göteborg, Örgryte IS | Gothenburg | 1923 | | 8,480 | | |
| Söderstadion | | Hammarby IF | Stockholm | 1966 | 2013 | 15,600 | | |
| Södertälje Fotbollsarena | | Assyriska FF, Syrianska FC | Södertälje | 2005 | | 6,400 | | |
| Stadsparksvallen | | Jönköpings Södra IF | Jönköping | 1902 | | 6,261 | | |
| Stockholm Olympic Stadium | | AIK, Djurgårdens IF, Hammarby IF, Westermalms IF | Stockholm | 1912 | | | | |
| Stora Valla | | Degerfors IF | Degerfors | 1938 | | | | |
| Strandvallen | | Mjällby AIF | Hällevik | 1953 | | 7,500 | | |
| Strömvallen | | Brynäs IF, Gefle IF | Gävle | 1903 | | 7,200 | | |
| Studenternas IP | | IK Sirius | Uppsala | 1909 | | 6,300 | | |
| Stadion | | Malmö FF | Malmö | 2009 | | 22,500 | | |
| T3 Arena | | Umeå FC | Umeå | 1925 | | | | |
| 3Arena | | Djurgårdens IF, Hammarby IF | Stockholm | 2013 | | 30,001 | 59.29081°N 18.08534°E | |
| Trollebo IP | | Hallstahammars SK | Hallstahammar | | | | | |
| Tunavallen | | AFC Eskilstuna, IK City, IFK Eskilstuna | Eskilstuna | 1924 | | 7,800 | | |
| Ullevi | | GAIS, IFK Göteborg, Örgryte IS | Gothenburg | 1958 | | | | |
| Vägga IP | | Högadals IS | Karlshamn | | | | | |
| Vångavallen | | Trelleborgs FF | Trelleborg | 1933 | | 7,000 | | |
| Värendsvallen | | Östers IF | Växjö | 1966 | | | | |

† For closed or demolished grounds, capacity is taken at closure.
‡ Currently in the process of, or scheduled to be developed.

== See also ==
- Record home attendances of Swedish football clubs
