= List of Landskrona BoIS seasons =

This is a list of Landskrona BoIS season results throughout history.

== Season results ==
Season		Pos.	Pl.	W	D	L	GS	GA	P	Notes	The Cup	Top scorer	Goals
1924–25	Allsvenskan	6	22	7	6	9	30	52	20		—N/a		
1925–26	Allsvenskan	7	22	7	4	11	56	67	18		—N/a		
1926–27	Allsvenskan	9	22	7	2	13	36	56	16		—N/a		
1927–28	Allsvenskan	9	22	8	2	12	49	52	18		—N/a		
1928–29	Allsvenskan	7	22	8	2	12	37	47	18		—N/a		
1929–30	Allsvenskan	7	22	8	4	10	54	56	18		—N/a		
1930–31	Allsvenskan	5	22	11	1	10	47	49	23		—N/a		
1931–32	Allsvenskan	10	22	4	8	10	35	58	16		—N/a		
1932–33	Allsvenskan	12	22	6	3	13	38	60	15	relegated	—N/a		
1933–34	Division 2 South	1	18	15	0	3	65	30	35	promoted won playoff	—N/a		
1934–35	Allsvenskan	6	22	10	2	10	47	47	22		—N/a		
1935–36	Allsvenskan	5	22	10	4	8	46	34	24		—N/a		
1936–37	Allsvenskan	9	22	9	1	12	33	42	19		—N/a		
1937–38	Allsvenskan	3	22	10	6	6	40	31	26	`Little silver Best placement ever	—N/a		
1938–39	Allsvenskan	4	22	9	7	6	29	36	25	Bronze	—N/a		
1939–40	Allsvenskan	7	22	7	7	8	42	50	21		—N/a		
1940–41	Allsvenskan	5	22	8	9	5	36	36	25		—N/a		
1941–42	Allsvenskan	11	22	5	4	13	22	47	14	relegated	Quarterfinals		
1942–43	Division 2 South	2	18	11	2	5	52	22	24		Round of 32		
1943–44	Division 2 South	1	18	14	1	3	71	17	29	promoted won playoff	Preliminaries		
1944–45	Allsvenskan	12	22	4	5	13	38	58	13	relegated	Round of 16		
1945–46	Division 2 South	1	18	13	3	2	53	20	29	lost playoff	Round of 16		
1946–47	Division 2 South	2	18	9	4	5	46	36	22		Preliminaries		
1947–48	Division 2 South West	1	18	12	3	3	49	24	27	promoted	Preliminaries		
1948–49	Allsvenskan	12	22	3	5	14	26	60	11	relegated	Round 1		
1949–50	Division 2 South West	3	18	8	4	6	38	29	20		Runners-up		
1950–51	Division 2 South West	5	18	6	6	6	33	32	18		Round of 16		
1951–52	Division 2 South West	9	18	5	4	9	24	30	14	relegated	Not qualified		
1952–53	Division 3 South	1	18	12	2	4	55	17	26	promoted	—N/a		
1953–54	Division 2 Götaland	5	26	12	5	9	49	41	29		Quarterfinals		
1954–55	Division 2 Götaland	8	26	8	6	12	31	42	22		—N/a		
1955–56	Division 2 Eastern Götaland	7	18	6	3	9	29	33	15		—N/a		
1956–57	Division 2 Eastern Götaland	2	22	14	3	5	56	29	31		—N/a		
1957–58	Division 2 Eastern Götaland	1	33	24	4	5	97	34	52	lost playoff	—N/a		
1959	Division 2 Eastern Götaland	1	22	13	8	1	51	19	34	lost playoff	—N/a		
1960	Division 2 Eastern Götaland	2	22	12	7	3	44	20	31		—N/a		
1961	Division 2 Eastern Götaland	4	22	11	6	5	50	30	28		—N/a		
1962	Division 2 Eastern Götaland	1	22	13	5	4	53	24	31	lost playoff	—N/a		
1963	Division 2 Western Götaland	5	22	13	2	7	45	37	28		—N/a		
1964	Division 2 Western Götaland	4	22	8	9	5	46	35	25		—N/a		
1965	Division 2 Western Götaland	2	22	13	6	3	58	28	32		—N/a		
1966	Division 2 Southern Götaland	3	22	13	6	3	60	36	32		—N/a		
1967	Division 2 Southern Götaland	7	24	10	3	11	51	49	23		Preliminaries		
1968	Division 2 Southern Götaland	1	22	14	5	3	51	26	33	lost playoff	—N/a		
1969	Division 2 Southern Götaland	7	22	9	4	9	33	35	22				
1970	Division 2 Southern Götaland	1	22	12	6	4	41	19	30	promoted won playoff			
1971	Allsvenskan	6	22	5	12	5	22	25	22				
1972	Allsvenskan	8	22	6	9	7	29	29	21		Cupwinners		
1973	Allsvenskan	7	26	11	6	9	35	34	28				
1974	Allsvenskan	7	26	11	4	11	43	36	26				
1975	Allsvenskan	4	26	9	12	5	32	32	30	Bronze			
1976	Allsvenskan	4	26	12	8	6	34	34	32	Bronze			
1977	Allsvenskan	5	26	12	5	9	43	34	29				
1978	Allsvenskan	10	26	6	10	10	28	38	22				
1979	Allsvenskan	12	26	8	5	13	32	41	21				
1980	Allsvenskan	13	26	5	7	14	26	46	17	relegated			
1981	Division 2 South	6	26	10	7	9	30	26	27				
1982	Division 2 South	5	22	9	6	7	31	31	24				
1983	Division 2 South	3	22	12	3	7	35	23	27				
1984	Division 2 South	12	26	6	8	12	32	38	20	relegated	Final		
1985	Division 3 South Western Götaland	1	22	12	6	4	54	28	30	promoted won playoff			
1986	Division 2 South	6	26	8	9	9	32	34	25				
1987	Division 1 South (still second tier)	10	26	8	8	10	24	33	24				
1988	Division 1 South	6	26	9	10	7	31	27	28				
1989	Division 1 South	8	26	7	8	11	35	43	22				
1990	Division 1 South	12	26	7	8	11	30	39	29				
1991	Division 1 South	7	14	2	4	8	11	19	10				
	Division 1 South, Autumn	6	14	3	4	7	17	29	13				
1992	Division 1 South	3	14	8	0	6	25	20	24				
	Division 1 South, Autumn	2	14	9	3	2	50	20	30				
1993	Division 1 South	1	26	19	4	3	71	22	61	promoted	Final		
1994	Allsvenskan	13	26	4	5	17	22	59	17	relegated			
1995	Division 1 South	14	26	7	1	18	31	66	22	relegated			
1996	Division 2 Southern Götaland	4	22	11	5	6	38	23	36				
1997	Division 2 Southern Götaland	1	22	11	7	4	52	20	40	promoted			
1998	Division 1 South	2	26	15	5	6	64	37	50	lost playoff			
1999	Division 1 South	5	26	12	9	5	52	30	45				
2000	Superettan	4	30	16	4	10	59	37	52		1/32	(Sweden) Danijel Milovanović (Sweden) Håkan Söderstjerna	11
2001	Superettan	2	30	20	5	5	60	26	65	promoted	1/32	(Sweden) Daniel Nannskog	21
2002	Allsvenskan	11	26	8	6	12	41	39	30		Round 2	(Sweden) Daniel Nannskog	11
2003	Allsvenskan	11	26	8	8	10	26	39	32		Round 2	(Sweden) Matthias Eklund (Sweden) Alexander Farnerud	5
2004	Allsvenskan	11	26	7	9	10	27	33	30		1/32	(Nigeria) Kevin Amuneke	7
2005	Allsvenskan	12	26	8	6	12	26	44	30	relegated lost playoff	1/32	(Nigeria) Kevin Amuneke	7
2006	Superettan	5	30	15	5	10	53	39	50		Quarterfinal	(Sweden) Matthias Eklund	10
2007	Superettan	11	30	9	8	13	39	45	35		Semifinal	(Sweden) Pär Cederqvist	9
2008	Superettan	11	30	10	8	12	36	44	38		1/16	(Sweden) Pär Cederqvist	7
2009	Superettan	8	30	12	4	14	51	46	40		1/16	(Sweden) Pär Cederqvist (Sweden) Fredrik Olsson	14
2010	Superettan	5	30	13	6	11	40	39	45		Round 2	(Sweden) Fredrik Karlsson	12
2011	Superettan	10	30	11	8	11	36	39	41		1/32	(Sweden) Ajsel Kujović (Sweden) Fredrik Olsson	7
2012	Superettan	6	30	12	5	13	35	43	41			(Sweden) Fredrik Olsson	9
2013	Superettan	12	30	9	5	16	40	48	32		GS (1/32)	(Sweden) Fredrik Karlsson (Sweden) Fredrik Olsson	9
2014	Superettan	15	30	6	8	16	35	55	26	relegated	Round 2	(United States) Andrew Stadler	13
2015	Division 1 Södra	6	26	11	4	11	37	32	37	Worst placement ever	GS (1/32)	(Bosnia and Herzegovina) Admir Aganović	7
2016	Division 1 Södra	3	26	14	4	8	50	25	46		Did not participate	(Sweden) Erik Pärsson	17
2017	Division 1 Södra	1	26	18	4	4	51	18	58	promoted	GS (1/32)	(Ghana) Sadat Karim	19
2018	Superettan	16	30	5	7	18	35	56	22	relegated	Round 2	(Ghana) Sadat Karim	11
2019	Division 1 Södra	2	30	16	10	4	47	19	58	lost playoff	Round 2	(Sweden) Linus Olsson	9
2020	Ettan Södra	2	30	17	8	5	54	30	59	promoted won playoff	Did not participate	(Sweden) Linus Olsson	12
2021	Superettan	6	30	13	5	12	41	37	44		GS (1/32)	(Sweden) Linus Olsson	8
2022	Superettan	6	30	11	11	8	40	42	44		GS (1/32)	(Sweden) Ousmane Diawara	8
2023	Superettan	7	30	11	6	13	40	49	39		GS (1/32)	(Sweden) Ousmane Diawara	9
2024	Superettan	3	30	14	7	9	46	34	49	lost playoff	GS (1/32)	(Denmark) Frederik Ihler	7
2025	Superettan	9	30	11	8	11	39	47	41		GS (1/32)	(Kosovo) Edi Sylisufaj	8

== Playoff results ==
Season	Date	Opponent	Result	Venue	City	Attendance
1922–23 Svenska Serien playoff	1923-05-27	Malmö FF	1–1	Unknown	Malmö	Unknown
	1923-05-31	Malmö FF	2–0	Unknown	Landskrona	Unknown
1933–34 Allsvenskan playoff	1934-06-10	Fässbergs IF	3–1	Landskrona IP	Landskrona	2 705
	1934-06-17	Fässbergs IF	2–0	Unknown	Gothenburg	2 513
1943–44 Allsvenskan playoff	1944-05-29	Billingsfors IK	5–2	Lövåsvallen	Billingsfors	6 000
	1944-06-04	Billingsfors IK	1–0	Landskrona IP	Landskrona	4 179
1945–46 Allsvenskan playoff	1946-05-26	Billingsfors IK	0–3	Lövåsvallen	Billingsfors	2 216
	1946-06-02	Billingsfors IK	1–0	Landskrona IP	Landskrona	3 921
	1946-06-10	Billingsfors IK	1–4	Gamla Ullevi	Gothenburg	11 451
1957–58 Allsvenskan playoff	1958-10-11	Örgryte IS	0–5	Nya Ullevi	Gothenburg	46 493
	1958-10-19	Örgryte IS	0–1	Landskrona IP	Landskrona	15 114
1959 Allsvenskan playoff	1959-10-11	Degerfors IF	3–2	Stora Valla	Degerfors	15 351
	1959-10-18	Degerfors IF	2–3	Landskrona IP	Landskrona	18 533
	1959-10-25	Degerfors IF	1–2	Råsunda Stadium	Stockholm	28 186
1962 Allsvenskan playoff	1962-10-13	IS Halmia	0–3	Örjans Vall	Halmstad	20 380
	1962-10-21	AIK	3–1	Landskrona IP	Landskrona	16 010
	1962-10-28	IFK Holmsund	3–1	Eyravallen	Örebro	6 904
1968 Allsvenskan playoff	1968-10-13	IK Sirius	0–1	Studenternas IP	Uppsala	12 000
	1968-10-20	Jönköpings Södra IF	1–1	Landskrona IP	Landskrona	15 116
	1968-10-26	Sandvikens IF	0–1	Nya Ullevi	Gothenburg	3 000
1970 Allsvenskan playoff	1970-10-10	Sandvikens IF	2–0	Landskrona IP	Landskrona	16 000
	1970-10-17	IFK Luleå	0–0	Skogsvallen	Luleå	12 416
	1970-10-24	Skövde AIK	2–2	Nya Ullevi	Gothenburg	10 832
1985 Division 2 playoff	1985-10-12	Linköpings FF	1–1	Folkungavallen	Linköping	3 194
	1985-10-20	Linköpings FF	1–1 a.e.t. (4–3 p)	Landskrona IP	Landskrona	6 019
1998 Allsvenskan playoff	1998-11-12	Trelleborgs FF	2–3	Landskrona IP	Landskrona	5 834
	1998-11-15	Trelleborgs FF	1–4	Vångavallen	Trelleborg	3 524
2005 Allsvenskan playoff	2005-10-26	GAIS	1–2	Gamla Ullevi	Gothenburg	7 606
	2005-10-30	GAIS	0–0	Landskrona IP	Landskrona	7 859
2019 Superettan playoff	2019-11-07	Östers IF	1–1	Landskrona IP	Landskrona	4 035
	2019-11-10	Östers IF	0–1	Myresjöhus Arena	Växjö	3 719
2020 Superettan playoff	2020-12-09	Dalkurd FF	2–0	Landskrona IP	Landskrona	8
	2020-12-09	Dalkurd FF	2–0	Landskrona IP	Landskrona	8
2024 Allsvenskan playoff	2024-11-21	IFK Värnamo	2–2	Landskrona IP	Landskrona	4 755
	2024-11-24	IFK Värnamo	0–1	Borås Arena	Borås	2 380

== Cup results ==
=== European participations ===
Season	Date	Round	Opponent	Result	Venue	City	Attendance
1972 Intertoto Cup	1972-07-01	Group stage	(Czechoslovakia) TJ ZVL Žilina	2–2	Landskrona IP	Landskrona	
	1972-07-08	Group stage	(Denmark) Vejle BK	0–0	Landskrona IP	Landskrona	
	1972-07-15	Group stage	(Czechoslovakia) TJ ZVL Žilina	0–1		Žilina	
	1972-07-22	Group stage	(Denmark) Vejle BK	2–1		Vejle	
	1972-07-29	Group stage	(West Germany) Eintracht Braunschweig	3–0	Landskrona IP	Landskrona	
	1972-08-05	Group stage	(West Germany) Eintracht Braunschweig	0–2		Braunschweig	
1972–73 UEFA Cup Winners' Cup	1972-11-13	Round 1	(Romania) FC Rapid București	0–3	Stadionul 23. August	Bucharest	4 986
	1972-11-27	Round 1	(Romania) FC Rapid București	1–0	Landskrona IP	Landskrona	10 000
1974 Intertoto Cup	1974-06-16	Group stage	(Turkey) Altay S.K.	1–1		İzmir	
	1974-06-29	Group stage	(Portugal) CUF Barreiro	1–1	Landskrona IP	Landskrona	
	1974-07-02	Group stage	(Turkey) Altay S.K.	1–1	Landskrona IP	Landskrona	
	1974-07-07	Group stage	(Sweden) Hammarby IF	4–0	Landskrona IP	Landskrona	558
	1974-07-13	Group stage	(Portugal) CUF Barreiro	0–1		Barreiro	
	1974-07-20	Group stage	(Sweden) Hammarby IF	2–1	Söderstadion	Stockholm	761
1976 Intertoto Cup	1976-06-26	Group stage	(Czechoslovakia) TJ Sklo Union Teplice	0–0		Teplice	
	1976-07-03	Group stage	(Switzerland) Grasshopper Club Zürich	0–0	Landskrona IP	Landskrona	
	1976-07-10	Group stage	(West Germany) Kickers Offenbach	1–2	Landskrona IP	Landskrona	
	1976-07-17	Group stage	(Switzerland) Grasshopper Club Zürich	0–1		Zürich	
	1976-07-24	Group stage	(West Germany) Kickers Offenbach	0–1		Offenbach am Main	
	1976-07-31	Group stage	(Czechoslovakia) TJ Sklo Union Teplice	1–1	Landskrona IP	Landskrona	
1977 Intertoto Cup	1977-06-26	Group stage	(Czechoslovakia) SK Slavia Prague	3–5	Landskrona IP	Landskrona	
	1977-07-02	Group stage	(Poland) Legia Warszawa	0–1	Stadion Miejski	Warsaw	10 000
	1977-07-09	Group stage	(Switzerland) BSC Young Boys	0–4	Stade de Suisse	Bern	
	1977-07-16	Group stage	(Czechoslovakia) SK Slavia Prague	1–6	Eden Arena	Prague	
	1977-07-23	Group stage	(Poland) Legia Warszawa	1–2	Landskrona IP	Landskrona	1 000
	1977-07-30	Group stage	(Switzerland) BSC Young Boys	2–1	Landskrona IP	Landskrona	
1977–78 UEFA Cup	1977-11-14	Round 1	(England) Ipswich Town F.C.	0–1	Landskrona IP	Landskrona	7 156
	1977-11-28	Round 1	(England) Ipswich Town F.C.	0–5	Portman Road	Ipswich	18 741

=== Svenska Cupen ===
Season	Round	Opponent	Result	Venue	City	Attendance
2000–01 Svenska Cupen	1	Ystads IF	2–0		Ystad	712
	2	Båstads GIF	7–0	Örebäcksvallen	Båstad	525
	3	Treby IF	10–1		Killeberg	
	4	Trelleborgs FF	0–2	Landskrona IP	Landskrona	1 585
2002 Svenska Cupen	2	Tidaholms GoIF	2–4		Tidaholm	1 296
2003 Svenska Cupen	2	Qviding FIF	0–2	Torpavallen	Gothenburg	1 050
2004 Svenska Cupen	2	Rynninge IK	2–1	Grenadjärvallen	Örebro	729
	3	Hammarby IF	0–1	Söderstadion	Stockholm	3 286
2005 Svenska Cupen	2	Topkapi IK	3–0	Stora Mossens IP	Stockholm	
	3	Malmö FF	1–3	Landskrona IP	Landskrona	2 507
2006 Svenska Cupen	2	BK Forward	2–2 a.e.t. (5–4 p)	Behrn Arena	Örebro	348
	3	Örgryte IS	3–0	Landskrona IP	Landskrona	1 329
	Round of 16	Västerås SK	2–1	Arosvallen	Västerås	334
	Quarterfinal	Gefle IF	2–3	Landskrona IP	Landskrona	2 461
2007 Svenska Cupen	2	Lärje-Angered IF	2–2 a.e.t. (7–6 p)	Bläsebovallen	Gothenburg	155
	3	Malmö FF	2–1	Landskrona IP	Landskrona	2 982
	Round of 16	Helsingborgs IF	2–1	Olympia	Helsingborg	7 075
	Quarterfinal	IFK Norrköping	3–2	Idrottsparken	Norrköping	3 254
	Semifinal	IFK Göteborg	0–4	Nya Ullevi	Gothenburg	2 222
2008 Svenska Cupen	2	Delsbo IF	2–0	Delsbo IP	Delsbo	550
	3	AIK	1–0	Strömvallen	Gävle	181
	Round of 16	GIF Sundsvall	0–1	Landskrona IP	Landskrona	890
2009 Svenska Cupen	1	Lunds BK	1–0	Klostergårdens IP	Lund	350
	2	Lindome GIF	1–0	Lindevi IP	Lindome	520
	Round of 16	GAIS	4–2	Landskrona IP	Landskrona	1 603
	Quarterfinal	IFK Göteborg	1–4	Landskrona IP	Landskrona	2 082
2010 Svenska Cupen	2	IF Limhamn Bunkeflo	0–1	Limhamns IP	Malmö	549
2011 Svenska Cupen	2	Lunds BK	1–0	Klostergårdens IP	Lund	470
	3	Helsingborgs IF	2–4 a.e.t.	Landskrona IP	Landskrona	4 833
2012–13 Svenska Cupen	2	Enskede IK	1–0	Enskede IP	Enskede	349
	Group stage	IFK Norrköping	0–0	Nya Parken	Norrköping	1 400
	Group stage	Mjällby AIF	0–3	Asarums IP	Karlshamn	402
	Group stage	Ängelholms FF	3–1	Landskrona IP (art. turf)	Landskrona	234
2013–14 Svenska Cupen	2	Hudiksvalls FF	1–1 a.e.t. (4–5 p)	Glysisvallen	Hudiksvall	823
2014–15 Svenska Cupen	2	Torns IF	1–1 a.e.t. (8–7 p)	Tornvallen	Stångby	750
	Group stage	AIK	0–4	Grimsta IP	Stockholm	3 015
	Group stage	Hammarby IF	1–1	Tele2 Arena	Stockholm	10 419
	Group stage	Kristianstads FF	3–1	Landskrona IP (art. turf)	Landskrona	350
2016–17 Svenska Cupen	1	IS Halmia	4–1	Örjans vall	Halmstad	145
	2	Malmö FF	3–1	Landskrona IP	Landskrona	5 125
	Group stage	Gefle IF	2–1	Landskrona IP (art. turf)	Landskrona	311
	Group stage	Kalmar FF	2–2	Landskrona IP (art. turf)	Landskrona	700
	Group stage	Trelleborgs FF	1–2	Vångavallen (art. turf)	Trelleborg	988
2017–18 Svenska Cupen	1	Eskilsminne IF	2–0	Harlyckans IP	Helsingborg	651
	2	IF Elfsborg	3–4 a.e.t.	Landskrona IP	Landskrona	1 598
2018–19 Svenska Cupen	2	FC Rosengård	0–2	Rosengårds IP	Malmö	320
2020–21 Svenska Cupen	1	FC Rosengård	2–1 a.e.t.	Rosengårds IP	Malmö	0
	2	Östers IF	1–0	Landskrona IP	Landskrona	50
	Group stage	Östersunds FK	0–3	Landskrona IP (art. turf)	Landskrona	0
	Group stage	Mjällby AIF	0–3	Landskrona IP (art. turf)	Landskrona	0
	Group stage	Akropolis IF	2–0	Grimsta IP	Stockholm	0
2021–22 Svenska Cupen	2	IF Viken	5–0	Rösvallen	Åmål	
	Group stage	IFK Göteborg	0–2	Valhalla IP	Gothenburg	2 553
	Group stage	Mjällby AIF	1–1	Strandvallen (art. turf)	Hällevik	320
	Group stage	Norrby IF	1–3	Landskrona IP (art. turf)	Landskrona	290
2022–23 Svenska Cupen	2	Österlen FF	3–0	Skillinge IP	Skillinge	372
	Group stage	Djurgårdens IF	1–6	Tele2 Arena	Stockholm	8 762
	Group stage	IF Brommapojkarna	3–2	Grimsta IP	Stockholm	108
	Group stage	Örebro SK	0–2	Landskrona IP (art. turf)	Landskrona	487
2023–24 Svenska Cupen	2	FC Trollhättan	4–0	Edsborgs IP	Trollhättan	503
	Group stage	IF Brommapojkarna	0–3	Grimsta IP	Stockholm	248
	Group stage	BK Häcken	3–2	Landskrona IP (art. turf)	Landskrona	700
	Group stage	Östersunds FK	0–1	Jämtkraft Arena	Östersund	519
2024–25 Svenska Cupen	2	Falkenbergs FF	2–0	Falcon Alkoholfri Arena	Falkenberg	525
	Group stage	Mjällby AIF	0–4	Strandvallen (art. turf)	Hällevik	
	Group stage	Halmstads BK	0–2	Bravida Arena	Gothenburg	400
	Group stage	Gefle IF	3–1	Landskrona IP (art. turf)	Landskrona	
2025–26 Svenska Cupen	2	Öckerö IF	1–3	Prästängens IP	Hönö	650
	Group stage	GAIS	0–3	Nordic Wellness Arena	Gothenburg	3 016
	Group stage	IFK Norrköping	0–2	Norrköpings Idrottspark	Norrköping	2 216
	Group stage	Sandvikens IF	3–2	Landskrona IP (art. turf)	Landskrona	

=== Distriktsmästerskapet ===
Season	Round	Opponent	Result	Venue	City	Attendance
2015 DM	3	Hittarps IK	6–1	Landskrona IP	Landskrona	
	4	Trelleborgs FF	3–0	Vångavallen	Trelleborg	392
	Quarterfinal	IFK Hässleholm	6–1	Landskrona IP	Landskrona	
	Semifinal	Österlen FF	2–0	Skillinge IP	Skillinge	168
	Final	Eskilsminne IF	1–3	Landskrona IP	Landskrona	500
2016 DM	3	Skabersjö IF	1–0	Landskrona IP	Landskrona	
	4	KSF Kosova IF	0–0 a.e.t. (5–4 p)	Ellenborgs IP	Malmö	
	Quarterfinal	Torns IF	3–1	Landskrona IP	Landskrona	400
	Semifinal	IFK Hässleholm	3–0	Landskrona IP	Landskrona	
	Final	Lunds BK	2–0	Klostergårdens IP	Lund	583
2017 DM	3	Helsingborg Östra IF	10–1	Landskrona IP	Landskrona	250
	4	Ifö Bromölla IF	4–1	Landskrona IP	Landskrona	258
	Quarterfinal	Kristianstad FC (played by U19)	2–5	Kristianstads IP	Kristianstad	123
2019 DM	3	KSF Kosova IF	5–0	Landskrona IP	Landskrona	
	4	IF Lödde	1–2 a.e.t.	Tolvans IP	Löddeköpinge	
2022 DM	3	Åstorps FF	1–0	Landskrona IP	Landskrona	155
	4	Ariana FC	5–0	Hyllie IP	Malmö	800
	Quarterfinal	Hässleholms IF (played by U19)	1–1 a.e.t. (11–10 p)	Landskrona IP	Landskrona (art. turf)	100
	Semifinal	IFK Malmö	5–2	Malmö Stadion	Malmö	77
	Final	IFK Simrishamn	2–0	Korsavads IC (art. turf)	Simrishamn	370
2023 DM	3	Västra Ingelstad IS (played by U19)	2–0	Västra Ingelstads IP	Västra Ingelstad	
	4	FBK Balkan	0–1	Landskrona IP	Landskrona	114
