= 2014 Landskrona BoIS season =

Landskrona BoIS
2014 season
- Chairman: Gabriel Munck af Rosenschöld
- Manager: Jörgen Pettersson
- Stadium: Landskrona IP
Home colours	Away colours

The 2014 season is Landskrona BoIS's 99th in existence, their 52nd season in the second highest division, their 11th season in Superettan and their 9th consecutive season in the league. They will compete in Superettan and Svenska Cupen.

== Players ==
=== Squad information ===
This section show the squad as currently. Caps and goals are as of the end of the 2013 season.

N	Pos.	Nat.	Name	Age	EU	Since	App	Goals	Ends	Transfer fee	Notes
1	GK	(Sweden)	Halvorsen, Bill	39	EU	2013	28	0	2014		
3	DF	(Sweden)	Jarl, Daniel	34	EU	2014	0	0	2015		
4	DF	(Sweden)	Rudolfsson, Martin	37	EU	2012	43	1	2014		(Scania)
6	DF	(Sweden)	Andersson, Philip	34	EU	2008	65	2	2015	Youth system	(Scania)
7	MF	(Sweden)	Dahl, Andreas	42	EU	2013	27	2	2014		(Scania)
8	MF	(United States)	Torres, Paul	34	Non-EU	2014	0	0	2015		
9	MF	(Sweden)	Kvist, William	32	EU	2014	0	0	2016		(Scania)
10	MF	(South Africa)	Ralani, Amethyst Bradley	38	Non-EU	2010	95	16	2014		
11	FW	(United States)	Stadler, Andrew	38	Non-EU	2014	0	0	2015		
12	MF	(Denmark)	Rønne, Niclas	40	EU	2014	0	0	2015		
13	DF	(Denmark)	Sarr, Cheikh Tidiane	39	EU	2014	0	0	2014		
14	MF	(Sweden)	Tkacz, Alexander	33	EU	2012	25	1	Youth contract	Youth system	(Scania)
15	FW	(Sweden)	Karlsson, Fredrik	40	EU	2010	78	26	2014		(Scania)
16	MF	(Sweden)	Olofsson, Dennis	30	EU	2013	4	0	Youth contract	Youth system	(Scania)
17	FW	(Sweden)	Alm, Rasmus	31	EU	2013	4	0	Youth contract	Youth system	(Scania)
18	DF	(Sweden)	Lernesjö, Jesper	31	EU	2014	0	0	Youth contract	Youth system	(Scania)
19	MF	(Sweden)	Tapper Holter, Christoffer	37	EU	2013	57	5	2014		
20	DF	(Sweden)	Ahmetovic, Enis	33	EU	2014	0	0	2015	Youth system	
21	FW	(Sweden)	Hofsö, Robin Eliasson	32	EU	2012	12	1	Youth contract	Youth system	(Scania)
22	GK	(Sweden)	Uddenäs, Niklas	40	EU	2012	4	0	2014		(Scania)
23	MF	(Sweden)	Persson, Kim	31	EU	2013	2	0	Youth contract	Youth system	(Scania)
24	DF	(Sweden)	Nordbeck, Mårten	35	EU	2014	0	0	2015		(Scania)
25	MF	(Sweden)	Andersson, Erik	29	EU	2012	24	3	2016	Youth system	(Scania)
26	DF	(Sweden)	Lydén, Cimon	31	EU	2013	1	0	Youth contract	Youth system	(Scania)
29	GK	(Sweden)	Kaddoura, Amr	32	EU	2013	0	0	2016	Youth system	(Scania)
—	DF	(Sweden)	Lundberg, Johnny	44	EU	2014	75	2	2015		(Scania)

- Last updated: 8 March 2014
- Source: landskronabois.com and players' Wikipedia articles
- Ordered by squad number.

=== Transfers ===
==== Winter 2013-14 ====
In: Note: Flags indicate national team as defined under FIFA eligibility rules; some limited exceptions apply. Players may hold more than one non-FIFA nationality.

No.	Pos.	Nation	Player
3	DF	SWE	Daniel Jarl (from Djurgårdens IF)
5	DF	SWE	Johnny Lundberg (from Sandnes Ulf)
8	MF	USA	Paul Torres (from Nyköpings BIS)
9	MF	SWE	William Kvist (from IFK Hässleholm)
11	FW	USA	Andrew Stadler (from Sandvikens IF)
12	MF	DEN	Niclas Rønne (from Kristianstads FF)
13	DF	DEN	Cheikh Tidiane Sarr (from Brønshøj BK)
20	DF	SWE	Enis Ahmetovic (from Nyköpings BIS)
24	DF	SWE	Mårten Nordbeck (from Lunds BK)

Out: Note: Flags indicate national team as defined under FIFA eligibility rules; some limited exceptions apply. Players may hold more than one non-FIFA nationality.

No.	Pos.	Nation	Player
3	DF	SWE	Linus Malmqvist (retire)
8	MF	FIN	Fredrik Svanbäck (to FF Jaro)
11	FW	SWE	Fredrik Olsson (to Jönköpings Södra IF)
12	FW	SWE	Alexander Nilsson (loan return to Malmö FF)
13	DF	KOS	Liridon Leçi (to FC Prishtina)
16	MF	SWE	Patrik Åström (to Trelleborgs FF)
17	DF	SWE	Tobias Malm (loan return to Malmö FF)
18	MF	SWE	Belvin Licina (to Höganäs BK)
20	DF	SWE	Philip Wikström (free transfer)
24	DF	SWE	Mohamad Zaaroura (free transfer)
26	MF	SWE	Mathias Andersson (free transfer)
77	DF	SWE	Max Mölder (to Akademisk Boldklub)

== Competitions ==
=== Svenska Cupen ===
==== 2014–15 ====
The tournament continues into the 2015 season.

Kickoff times are in UTC+1.

== Non competitive ==
=== Pre-season ===
Kick-off times are in UTC+1 unless stated otherwise.

8 February 2014 Friendly	Landskrona BoIS	0–1	Trelleborgs FF	Landskrona, Sweden
14:00		Report	M. Andersson 81'	Stadium: Landskrona IP (artificial turf pitch)

15 February 2014 Friendly	Ängelholms FF	0–6	Landskrona BoIS	Ängelholm, Sweden
13:00			F. Karlsson 14'; Torres 16'; Jarl 45'; Tkacz 56'; Dahl 62'; Sarr 75'	Stadium: Valhall Park (artificial turf pitch)

22 February 2014 Friendly	Varbergs BoIS FC	v	Landskrona BoIS	Varberg, Sweden
13:00

1 March 2014 Friendly	(Denmark) FC Helsingør	v	(Sweden) Landskrona BoIS	Helsingør, Denmark
12:20

8 March 2014 Friendly	Lunds BK	v	Landskrona BoIS	Lund, Sweden
13:00

15 March 2014 Friendly	(Denmark) Lyngby BK	v	(Sweden) Landskrona BoIS	Kongens Lyngby, Denmark
13:00

22 March 2014 Friendly	(Sweden) Landskrona BoIS	v	(Denmark) BK Fremad Amager	Landskrona, Sweden
13:00
