= 2013 Landskrona BoIS season =

Landskrona BoIS
2013 season
- Chairman: Kenneth Håkansson
- Manager: Jörgen Pettersson
- Stadium: Landskrona IP
- Superettan: 12th
- Svenska Cupen 2012–13: Group stage
- Svenska Cupen 2013–14: Round 2
- Top goalscorer: League: Fredrik Karlsson (9); Fredrik Olsson (9); All: Fredrik Olsson (10)
Home colours	Away colours

The 2013 season was Landskrona BoIS's 98th in existence, their 51st season in the second highest division, their 10th season in Superettan and their 8th consecutive season in the league. They competed in Superettan and Svenska Cupen. The season began with the group stage of Svenska Cupen in March, and league play started in April and lasted until November. Jörgen Pettersson replaced Henrik Larsson as manager in December 2012, and Georg "Rossi" Eterovic replaced Hans Eklund as assistant manager. The captain this season was Linus Malmqvist, with Fredrik Svanbäck as vice captain.

== Key events of the season ==
- 16 November 2012: Jörgen Pettersson is announced as new head coach, with Georg "Rossi" Eterovic as assistant, which means that Henrik Larsson and Hans Eklund will leave the club.
- 20 November 2012: Henrik Larsson and Hans Eklund makes their last training as coaches of the club.
- 19 December 2012: Malmö FF players Alexander Nilsson and Tobias Malm is announced will join Landskrona on loan for the 2013 season.
- 8 January 2013: Goalkeeper Bill Halvorsen joins the club from IFK Värnamo, and goalkeeper Ivo Vazgec leaves the club as free agent.
- 1 February 2013: Midfielder Andreas Dahl joins the club, having previously played for Hammarby IF.
- 9 February 2013: BoIS wins the first match of the pre-season against Falkenbergs FF with 4–0.
- 6 April 2013: BoIS wins the first match of the 2013 Superettan against Degerfors IF at home with 1–0, with a goal scored by Amethyst Bradley Ralani.
- 12 August 2013: For the third time in recently played matches, BoIS loses a match on extra time. This time against Ängelholms FF on Ängelholms IP in the Scanian derby with 1–2.
- 14 September 2013: BoIS wins with 4–1 against Hammarby IF on Landskrona IP, with a hattrick scored by Fredrik Olsson.
- 21 October 2013: After heavy protests from the fans, the Landskrona BoIS board decides to draw back their decision on switching from natural to artificial turf on Landskrona IP.
- 21 October 2013: Landskrona BoIS loses their fifth match in a row.
- 24 October 2013: Landskrona BoIS suspends the defender Liridon Leçi and goalkeeper Bill Halvorsen from further play, with suspicions that the players have been bribed to influence the team's performances negatively.
- 2 November 2013: Landskrona BoIS secures their place in Superettan 2014 by drawing 0–0 at home with GIF Sundsvall. Reserve goalkeeper Niklas Uddenäs becomes the hero of the day with a couple of high class saves.

== Players ==
=== First-team squad ===
This section shows the squad as of the end of the 2013 season.

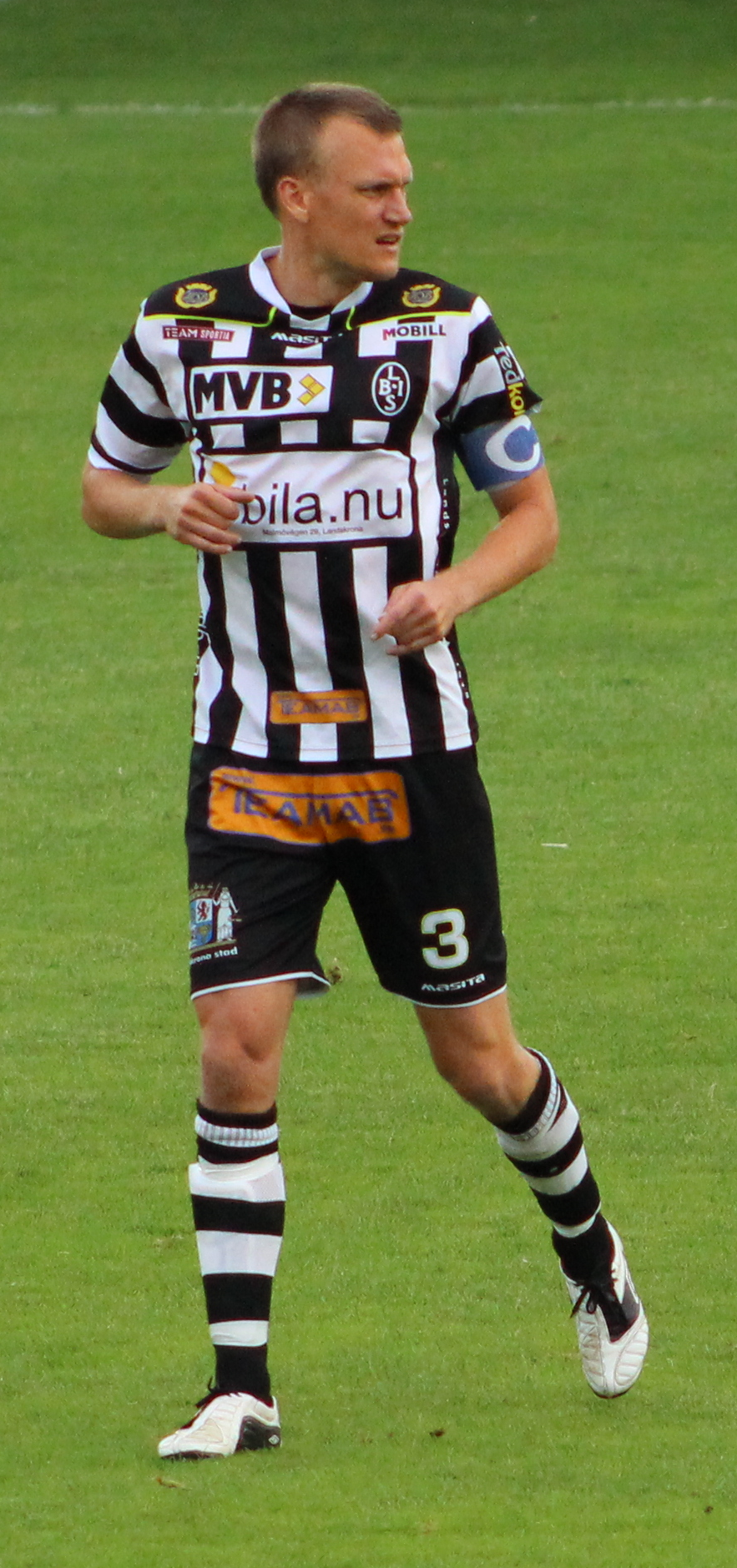
Linus Malmqvist was the captain for the first-team squad in 2013. He played a total of 32 competitive matches during the season.

Note: Flags indicate national team as defined under FIFA eligibility rules; some limited exceptions apply. Players may hold more than one non-FIFA nationality.

No.	Pos.	Nation	Player
1	GK	SWE	Bill Halvorsen
3	DF	SWE	Linus Malmqvist (captain)
4	DF	SWE	Martin Rudolfsson
6	DF	SWE	Philip Andersson
7	MF	SWE	Andreas Dahl
8	MF	FIN	Fredrik Svanbäck (vice captain)
10	FW	RSA	Amethyst Bradley Ralani
11	FW	SWE	Fredrik Olsson
12	FW	SWE	Alexander Nilsson
13	DF	KOS	Liridon Leçi
14	MF	SWE	Alexander Tkacz
15	FW	SWE	Fredrik Karlsson

No.	Pos.	Nation	Player
16	MF	SWE	Patrik Åström
17	MF	SWE	Tobias Malm
18	MF	SWE	Belvin Licina
19	MF	SWE	Christoffer Tapper Holter
21	FW	SWE	Robin Eliasson Hofsö
22	GK	SWE	Niklas Uddenäs
23	MF	SWE	Kim Persson
25	MF	SWE	Erik Andersson
26	MF	SWE	Mathias Andersson
29	GK	SWE	Amr Kaddoura
77	DF	SWE	Max Mölder

=== Youth players ===
This section shows youth players who made appearances in the first-team squad as of the end of the 2013 season.

Note: Flags indicate national team as defined under FIFA eligibility rules; some limited exceptions apply. Players may hold more than one non-FIFA nationality.

No.	Pos.	Nation	Player
33	MF	SWE	Rasmus Alm
36	MF	SWE	Dennis Olofsson

No.	Pos.	Nation	Player
39	DF	SWE	Jesper Lernesjö
42	MF	SWE	Cimon Lydén

=== Transfers ===
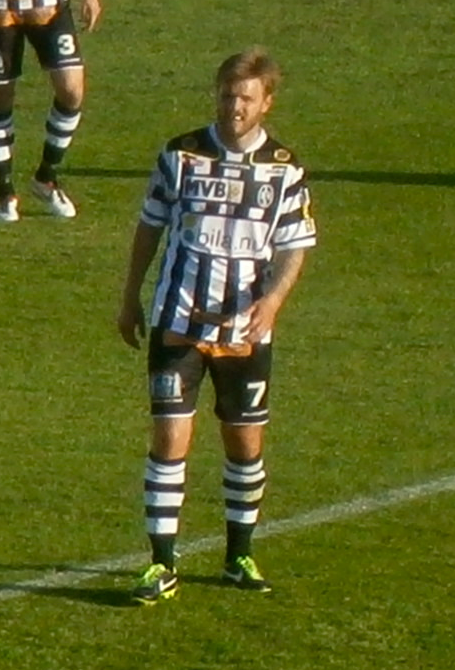
Midfielder Andreas Dahl joined Landskrona during the winter from Hammarby IF, where he had spent his last four seasons. Dahl played a total of 27 league matches during the season, and scored two goals.

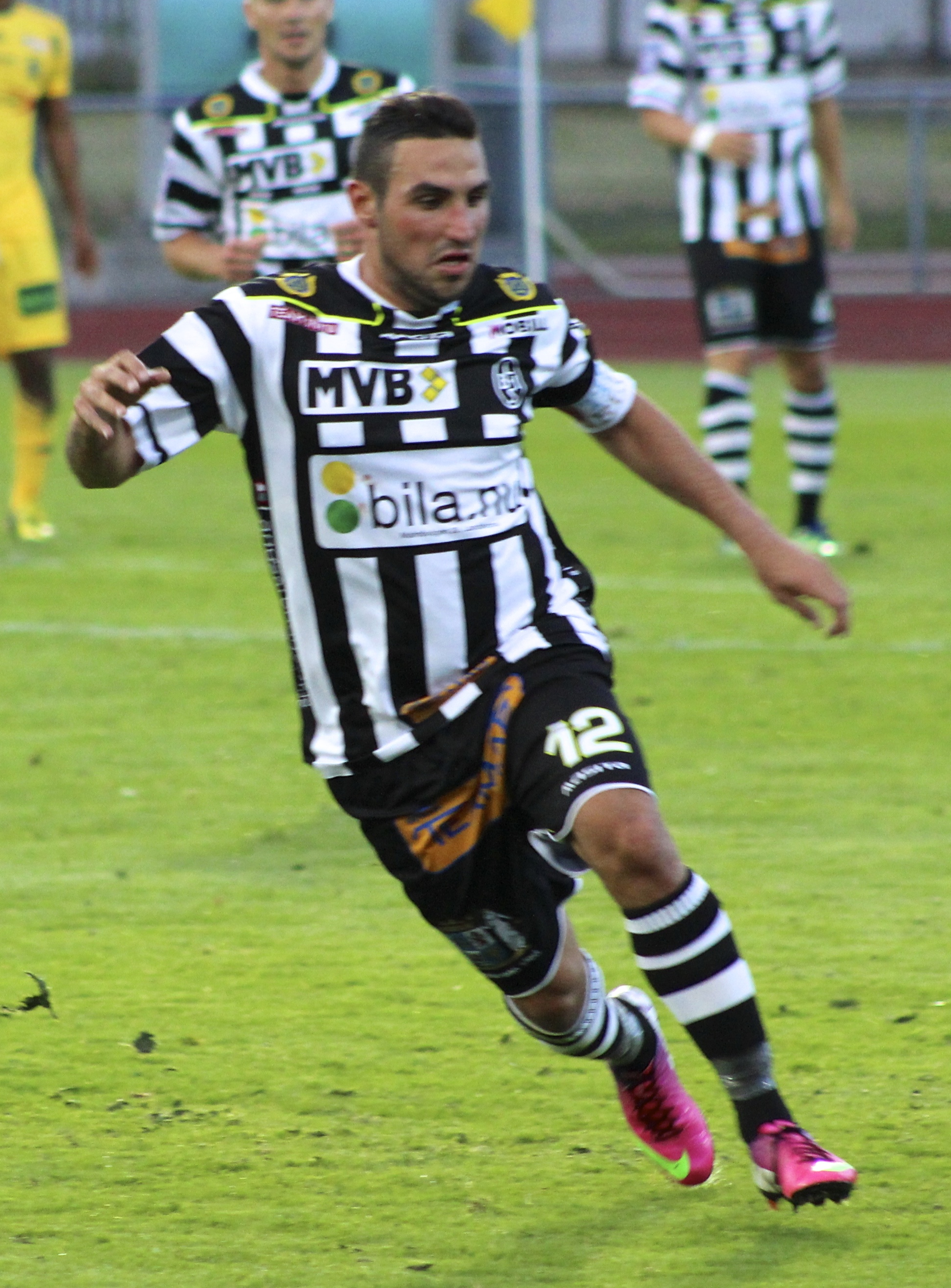
Forward Alexander Nilsson joined Landskrona during the winter on loan from Malmö FF, along with teammate Tobias Malm. Alex Nilsson played a total of 22 matches during the season and scored 8 goals.

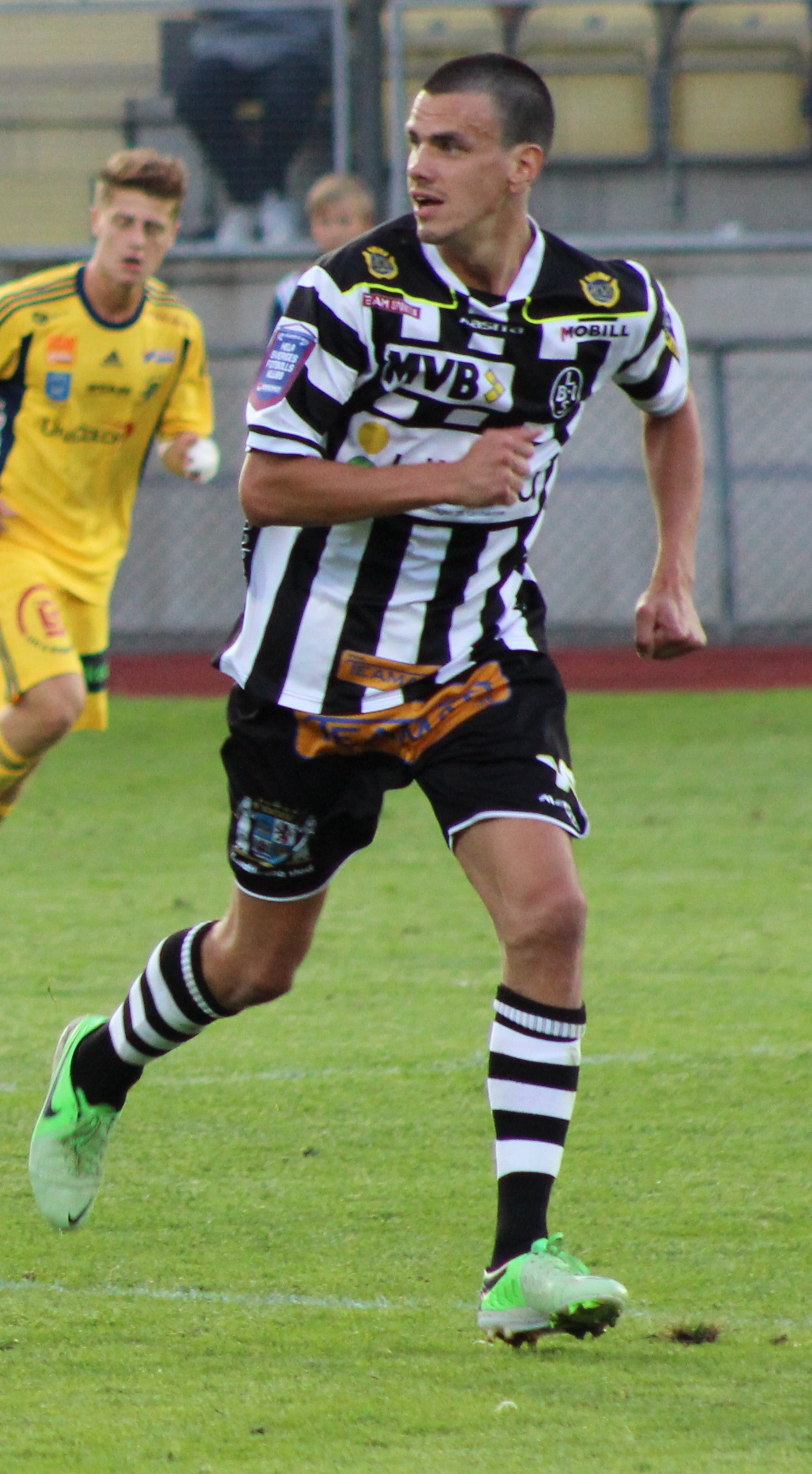
Midfielder Christoffer Tapper Holter returned to Landskrona from Kristianstads FF during the winter.

==== Winter 2012-13 ====
In: Note: Flags indicate national team as defined under FIFA eligibility rules; some limited exceptions apply. Players may hold more than one non-FIFA nationality.

No.	Pos.	Nation	Player
1	GK	SWE	Bill Halvorsen (from IFK Värnamo)
7	MF	SWE	Andreas Dahl (from Hammarby IF)
12	FW	SWE	Alexander Nilsson (on loan from Malmö FF)
13	DF	KOS	Liridon Leçi (from Kalmar FF)
17	DF	SWE	Tobias Malm (on loan from Malmö FF)
19	MF	SWE	Christoffer Tapper Holter (from Kristianstads FF)

Out: Note: Flags indicate national team as defined under FIFA eligibility rules; some limited exceptions apply. Players may hold more than one non-FIFA nationality.

No.	Pos.	Nation	Player
1	GK	SWE	Peter Karlsson (retire)
7	MF	SWE	Marcus Lantz (retire)
13	DF	SWE	Alexander Zaim (to Nybergsund IL-Trysil)
17	DF	SWE	Fredrik Liverstam (to Halmstads BK)
21	FW	TOG	Abdou-Fatawou Dodja (loan return to AS Douanes)
25	FW	SWE	Linus R. Olsson (to Trelleborgs FF)
29	GK	SWE	Ivo Vazgeč (to IF Brommapojkarna)

==== Summer 2013 ====
In: Note: Flags indicate national team as defined under FIFA eligibility rules; some limited exceptions apply. Players may hold more than one non-FIFA nationality.

No.	Pos.	Nation	Player

Out: Note: Flags indicate national team as defined under FIFA eligibility rules; some limited exceptions apply. Players may hold more than one non-FIFA nationality.

No.	Pos.	Nation	Player
9	FW	SWE	Luka Mijaljević (to Ljungskile SK)
20	DF	SWE	Philip Wikström (on loan to IF Limhamn Bunkeflo)
24	DF	SWE	Mohamad Zaaroura (on loan to IF Limhamn Bunkeflo)
28	MF	SWE	Jesper Lundberg (to Kvarnby IK)

=== Squad stats ===
As of the end of the 2013 season.

Number	Position	Name	2013 Superettan		2012–13 Svenska Cupen 2013–14 Svenska Cupen		Total	
Number	Position	Name	Appearances	Goals	Appearances	Goals	Appearances	Goals
1	GK	Bill Halvorsen	28	0	4	0	32	0
3	DF	Linus Malmqvist	28	1	4	0	32	1
4	DF	Martin Rudolfsson	19+3	0	1	0	23	0
6	DF	Philip Andersson	22	0	3	0	25	0
7	MF	Andreas Dahl	27	2	1+2	0	30	2
8	MF	Fredrik Svanbäck	16+3	0	3+1	0	23	0
9	FW	Luka Mijaljević*	1+5	0	1	0	7	0
10	MF	Amethyst Bradley Ralani	25	4	3+1	0	29	4
11	FW	Fredrik Olsson	15+7	9	3+1	1	26	10
12	FW	Alexander Nilsson	18+4	8	2+2	1	26	9
13	DF	Liridon Leçi	15	1	2	0	17	1
14	MF	Alexander Tkacz	14+5	1	2+2	1	23	2
15	FW	Fredrik Karlsson	19+7	9	2	0	28	9
16	MF	Patrik Åström	16+7	1	2	0	25	1
17	DF	Tobias Malm	11+3	0	2	0	16	0
17	DF	Belvin Licina	1+2	0	0	0	3	0
19	MF	Christoffer Tapper Holter	13+5	1	2+1	0	21	1
21	FW	Robin Eliasson Hofsö	0+5	0	0+1	0	6	0
22	GK	Niklas Uddenäs	2	0	0	0	2	0
23	MF	Kim Persson	1+1	0	0+1	0	3	0
24	DF	Mohamad Zaaroura	0	0	1	0	1	0
25	MF	Erik Andersson	12+10	2	2	0	24	2
26	MF	Mathias Andersson	2+12	0	1	0	15	0
33	FW	Rasmus Alm	0+4	0	0	0	4	0
34	FW	Mohamed Abo-Shark*	0	0	0+1	0	1	0
36	MF	Dennis Olofsson	0+4	0	0	0	4	0
42	MF	Cimon Lydén	0+1	0	0	0	1	0
77	DF	Max Mölder	25	0	3	0	28	0

* Player left the club mid-season

=== Goalscorers ===
The list is sorted by shirt number when total goals are equal and includes all competitive matches.

Rank	Pos	No.	Player	Superettan	Svenska Cupen	Total
1	FW	11	(Sweden) Fredrik Olsson	9	1	10
2	FW	15	(Sweden) Fredrik Karlsson	9	0	9
3	FW	12	(Sweden) Alexander Nilsson	8	1	9
4	FW	10	(South Africa) Amethyst Bradley Ralani	4	0	4
5	MF	7	(Sweden) Andreas Dahl	2	0	2
6	MF	14	(Sweden) Alexander Tkacz	1	1	2
7	MF	25	(Sweden) Erik Andersson	2	0	2
8	DF	3	(Sweden) Linus Malmqvist	1	0	1
9	DF	13	(Kosovo) Liridon Leçi	1	0	1
10	MF	16	(Sweden) Patrik Åström	1	0	1
11	MF	19	(Sweden) Christoffer Tapper Holter	1	0	1

Top scorers

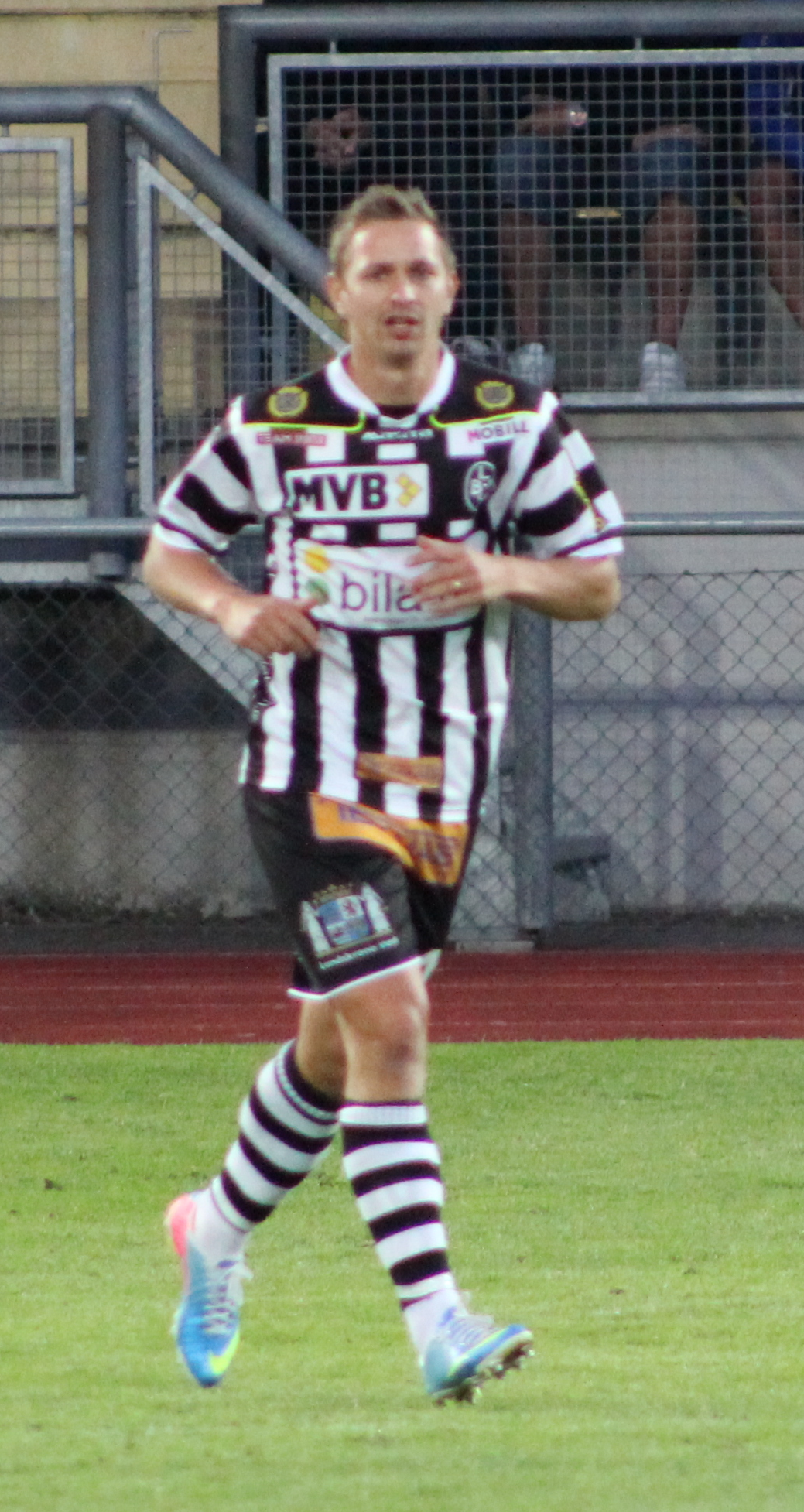
Forward Fredrik Olsson played 27 league matches and scored 9 goals, which along with one goal in the cup made him the team's best goal scorer overall with 10 goals.

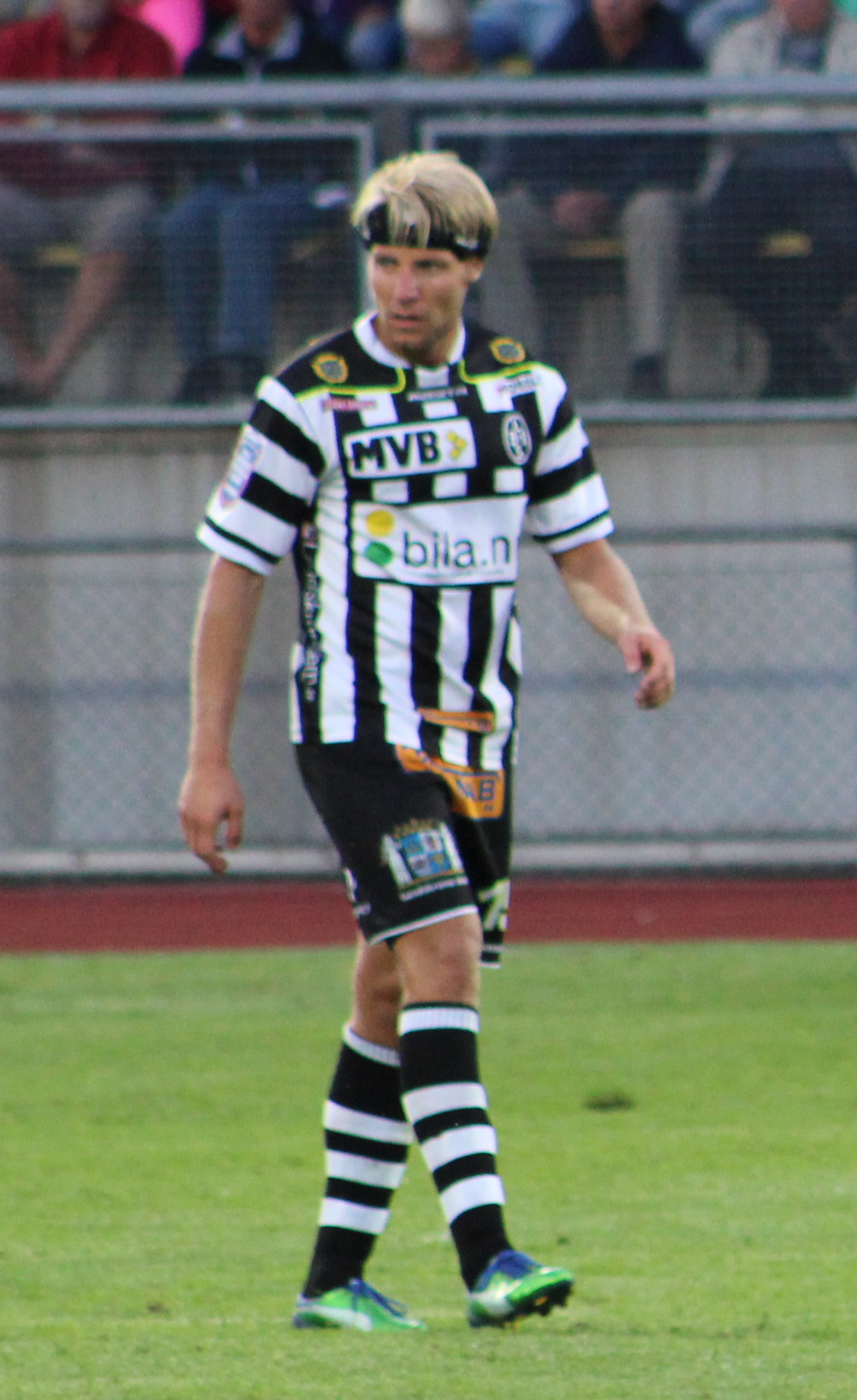
Forward Fredrik Karlsson played 26 league matches and scored 9 goals, which made him Landskrona's top scorer in the Superettan league, along with Fredrik Olsson.

The eleven most used starting players on each position in 2013 Superettan.

== Club officials ==
This list shows the club officials as of the end of the 2013 season.

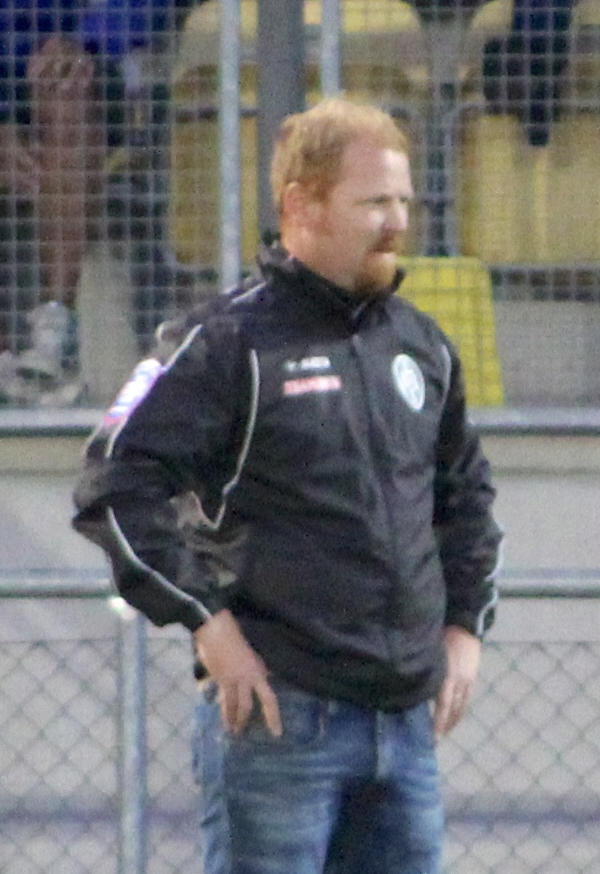
Jörgen Pettersson, who played in Landskrona between 2004 and 2008, made his first season as head coach.

=== Organisation ===
Role	Name	Nation
Chairman	Kenneth Håkansson	(Sweden)
Sporting director	Mats Aronsson	(Sweden)

=== Technical staff ===
Role	Name	Nation
Manager	Jörgen Pettersson	(Sweden)
Assistant manager	Georg "Rossi" Eterovic	(Sweden)
First team coach	Roland Rundqvist	(Sweden)
Goalkeeping coach	Mats I. Svensson (until August 2013)	(Sweden)
Goalkeeping coach	Benny Johansson (from August 2013)	(Sweden)
Individual coach	Mats Andersson	(Sweden)
Fitness coach	Mats Christiansson	(Sweden)
Physiotherapist	Thomas Mårtensson	(Sweden)
Club doctor	Ioannis Kostogiannis	(Greece)
Masseur	Peter Lantz	(Sweden)
Equipment manager	Stig Persson	(Sweden)
Equipment manager	Lars Persson	(Sweden)

== Competitions ==
=== Superettan ===
==== League table ====
Pos	Team	Pld	W	D	L	GF	GA	GD	Pts	Promotion, qualification or relegation
1	Falkenbergs FF (C, P)	30	19	5	6	63	31	+32	62	Promotion to Allsvenskan
2	Örebro SK (P)	30	17	10	3	52	21	+31	61	Promotion to Allsvenskan
3	GIF Sundsvall	30	16	10	4	54	35	+19	58	Qualification to Promotion playoffs
4	Degerfors IF	30	14	10	6	52	41	+11	52	
5	Hammarby IF	30	13	8	9	34	28	+6	47	
6	Ängelholms FF	30	11	10	9	55	47	+8	43	
7	GAIS	30	12	7	11	45	47	−2	43	
8	Assyriska FF	30	12	6	12	42	44	−2	42	
9	Ljungskile SK	30	12	3	15	34	31	+3	39	
10	Östersunds FK	30	10	9	11	39	38	+1	39	
11	Jönköpings Södra IF	30	11	5	14	39	44	−5	38	
12	Landskrona BoIS	30	9	5	16	40	48	−8	32	
13	Varbergs BoIS (O)	30	9	5	16	47	65	−18	32	Qualification to Relegation playoffs
14	IFK Värnamo (O)	30	7	10	13	30	51	−21	31	Qualification to Relegation playoffs
15	Örgryte IS (R)	30	5	13	12	23	40	−17	28	Relegation to Division 1
16	IK Brage (R)	30	2	6	22	21	59	−38	12	Relegation to Division 1

Source: svenskfotboll.se (in Swedish)
Rules for classification: 1) points; 2) goal difference; 3) number of goals scored.
(C) Champions; (O) Play-off winners; (P) Promoted; (R) Relegated

==== Results summary ====
Overall								Home						Away					
Pld	W	D	L	GF	GA	GD	Pts	W	D	L	GF	GA	GD	W	D	L	GF	GA	GD
30	9	5	16	40	48	−8	32	7	3	5	27	18	+9	2	2	11	13	30	−17

Source: svenskfotboll.se (in Swedish)

==== Results by round ====
Round	1	2	3	4	5	6	7	8	9	10	11	12	13	14	15	16	17	18	19	20	21	22	23	24	25	26	27	28	29	30
Ground	H	H	A	H	A	H	A	H	A	H	H	A	H	A	H	A	A	A	H	A	H	A	H	A	H	A	A	H	A	H
Result	W	D	D	L	L	W	L	D	W	W	L	L	W	L	W	L	L	L	W	D	L	W	W	L	L	L	L	L	L	D
Position	6	6	5	9	13	8	12	11	9	7	7	9	9	9	7	8	11	11	10	10	10	10	8	10	11	11	11	12	12	12

Source: see below
A = Away; H = Home; W = Win; D = Draw; L = Loss

==== Matches ====
Kickoff times are in UTC+1.

6 April 2013 Round 1	Landskrona BoIS	1 – 0	Degerfors IF	Landskrona, Skåne County
16:00	Ralani 66'	Report		Stadium: Landskrona IP; Attendance: 2,613; Referee: Glenn Nyberg, Borlänge

12 April 2013 Round 2	Landskrona BoIS	0 – 0	Ängelholms FF	Landskrona, Skåne County
19:20		Report		Stadium: Landskrona IP; Attendance: 1,993; Referee: Antti Kanerva, Olofstorp

20 April 2013 Round 3	Östersunds FK	2 – 2	Landskrona BoIS	Östersund, Jämtland County
15:00	Joseph 6'; Boakye 32'	Report	E. Andersson 87'; Malmqvist 90'	Stadium: Jämtkraft Arena; Attendance: 3,768; Referee: Dragan Banjac, Haninge

28 April 2013 Round 4	Landskrona BoIS	2 – 4	Örgryte IS	Landskrona, Skåne County
17:00	Tapper Holter 45+1'; Dahl 48'	Report	Wallén 13'; Leinar 16'; E. Karlsson 35', 89'	Stadium: Landskrona IP; Attendance: 2,381; Referee: Lars Olsson, Umeå

7 May 2013 Round 5	Ljungskile SK	3 – 0	Landskrona BoIS	Gothenburg, Västra Götaland County
19:00	Lindberg 57'; Mustafi 60'; Sinclair 64'	Report		Stadium: Valhalla IP; Attendance: 214; Referee: Glenn Nyberg, Borlänge

13 May 2013 Round 6	Landskrona BoIS	2 – 1	IFK Värnamo	Landskrona, Skåne County
19:00	Karlsson 30', 41'	Report	Björkeryd 85'	Stadium: Landskrona IP; Attendance: 1,558; Referee: Lars Olsson, Umeå

20 May 2013 Round 7	Hammarby IF	1 – 0	Landskrona BoIS	Stockholm, Stockholm County
19:00	Besara 41'	Report		Stadium: Söderstadion; Attendance: 8,721; Referee: Antti Kanerva, Olofstorp

23 May 2013 Round 8	Landskrona BoIS	0 – 0	Falkenbergs FF	Landskrona, Skåne County
19:00		Report		Stadium: Landskrona IP; Attendance: 3,028; Referee: Jim Petersson, Motala

27 May 2013 Round 9	Assyriska FF	0 – 3	Landskrona BoIS	Södertälje, Stockholm County
19:00		Report	Nilsson 36'; Ralani 76'; Dahl 80'	Stadium: Södertälje Fotbollsarena; Attendance: 1,623; Referee: Lars Olsson, Umeå

1 June 2013 Round 10	Landskrona BoIS	4 – 1	IK Brage	Landskrona, Skåne County
16:00	Nilsson 18', 53'; Karlsson 45+3' (pen.); Åström 90+1'	Report	Tauer 79'	Stadium: Landskrona IP; Attendance: 1,761; Referee: Dragan Banjac, Haninge

10 June 2013 Round 11	Landskrona BoIS	1 – 2	Örebro SK	Landskrona, Skåne County
19:00	Tkacz 58'	Report	Samuelsson 62', 73'	Stadium: Landskrona IP; Attendance: 2,336; Referee: Nermin Cisic, Värnamo

16 June 2013 Round 12	GAIS	3 – 0	Landskrona BoIS	Gothenburg, Västra Götaland County
15:45	Malmqvist 29' (o.g.); Drugge 56'; Augustsson 66'	Report		Stadium: Gamla Ullevi; Attendance: 1,894; Referee: Jim Petersson, Motala

24 June 2013 Round 13	Landskrona BoIS	2 – 0	Jönköpings Södra IF	Landskrona, Skåne County
19:00	Olsson 80'; E. Andersson 90+2'	Report		Stadium: Landskrona IP; Attendance: 2,445; Referee: Dragan Banjac, Haninge

29 June 2013 Round 14	GIF Sundsvall	3 – 2	Landskrona BoIS	Sundsvall, Västernorrland County
16:00	Ålander 59'; Chennoufi 71'; Maripuu 90+6'	Report	Olsson 42', 66'	Stadium: Norrporten Arena; Attendance: 2,387; Referee: Glenn Nyberg, Borlänge

22 July 2013 Round 15	Landskrona BoIS	5 – 0	Varbergs BoIS FC	Landskrona, Skåne County
19:00	Olsson 9', 44'; Leçi 33'; Nilsson 37'; Karlsson 87'	Report		Stadium: Landskrona IP; Attendance: 2,257; Referee: Jim Petersson, Motala

26 July 2013 Round 16	Varbergs BoIS FC	2 – 1	Landskrona BoIS	Varberg, Halland County
19:20	Rexhepi 41'; Altemark Vanneryr 90+1'	Report	Nilsson 42'	Stadium: Påskbergsvallen; Attendance: 1,455; Referee: Magnus Ahlsén, Linköping

5 August 2013 Round 17	Degerfors IF	2 – 1	Landskrona BoIS	Degerfors, Örebro County
19:20	Astvald 56'; Sundgren 89'	Report		Stadium: Stora Valla; Attendance: 2,510; Referee: Dragan Banjac, Haninge

12 August 2013 Round 18	Ängelholms FF	2 – 1	Landskrona BoIS	Ängelholm, Skåne County
19:00	Staaf 90', 90+4'	Report	Nilsson 36'	Stadium: Ängelholms IP; Attendance: 1,679; Referee: Lars Olsson, Umeå

18 August 2013 Round 19	Landskrona BoIS	4 – 0	Östersunds FK	Landskrona, Skåne County
18:00	18' (o.g.); Nilsson 78', 90+3'; Olsson 80'	Report		Stadium: Landskrona IP; Attendance: 1,639; Referee: Per Melin, Solna

26 August 2013 Round 20	Örgryte IS	0 – 0	Landskrona BoIS	Gothenburg, Västra Götaland County
19:00		Report		Stadium: Gamla Ullevi; Attendance: 1,747; Referee: Nermin Cisic, Värnamo

29 August 2013 Round 21	Landskrona BoIS	0 – 2	Ljungskile SK	Landskrona, Skåne County
19:00		Report	Olsson 10'; Mankoo 67'	Stadium: Landskrona IP; Attendance: 1,779; Referee: Antti Kanerva, Olofstorp

2 September 2013 Round 22	IFK Värnamo	0 – 2	Landskrona BoIS	Värnamo, Jönköping County
19:00		Report	Ralani 55'; Karlsson 76'	Stadium: Finnvedsvallen; Attendance: 1,279; Referee: Jim Petersson, Motala

14 September 2013 Round 23	Landskrona BoIS	4 – 1	Hammarby IF	Landskrona, Skåne County
15:00	Olsson 10', 17', 20'; Karlsson 63'	Report	Bakircioglü 18'	Stadium: Landskrona IP; Attendance: 2,646; Referee: Magnus Ahlsén, Linköping

18 September 2013 Round 24	Falkenbergs FF	4 – 0	Landskrona BoIS	Falkenberg, Halland County
19:20	Svensson 48'; Blomqvist Zampi 63'; Sköld 70'; Rodevåg 90+3'	Report		Stadium: Falkenbergs IP; Attendance: 2,302; Referee: Antti Kanerva, Olofstorp

23 September 2013 Round 25	Landskrona BoIS	0 – 4	Assyriska FF	Landskrona, Skåne County
19:00		Report	Aganović 22', 70'; Obiefule 29'; Brandeborn 52'	Stadium: Landskrona IP; Attendance: 1,832; Referee: Jim Persson, Motala

30 September 2013 Round 26	IK Brage	2 – 1	Landskrona BoIS	Borlänge, Dalarna County
19:00	Kapčević 1'; Moldskred 65'	Report	Karlsson 14'	Stadium: Domnarvsvallen; Attendance: 711; Referee: Kaspar Sjöberg, Malmö

7 October 2013 Round 27	Örebro SK	3 – 0	Landskrona BoIS	Örebro, Örebro County
19:00	Hasani 10', 63'; Holmberg 50'	Report		Stadium: Behrn Arena; Attendance: 3,924; Referee: Dragan Banjac, Haninge

21 October 2013 Round 28	Landskrona BoIS	2 – 3	GAIS	Landskrona, Skåne County
19:00	Ralani 31'; Karlsson 72'	Report	Moënza 3'; Drugge 11'; Mendes 65'	Stadium: Landskrona IP; Attendance: 1,843; Referee: Glenn Nyberg, Borlänge

28 October 2013 Round 29	Jönköpings Södra IF	3 – 1	Landskrona BoIS	Jönköping, Jönköping County
19:00	Svanbäck 45+1' (o.g.); Smylie 59'; Thelin 90+2'	Report	Karlsson 54'	Stadium: Stadsparksvallen; Attendance: 1,203; Referee: Kristoffer Karlsson, Helsingborg

2 November 2013 Round 30	Landskrona BoIS	0 – 0	GIF Sundsvall	Landskrona, Skåne County
15:00		Report		Stadium: Landskrona IP; Attendance: 2,024; Referee: Dragan Banjac, Haninge

=== Svenska Cupen ===
==== 2012–13 ====
The tournament continues from the 2012 season.

Kickoff times are in UTC+1.

===== Group stage =====
Key to colours in group tables
Group winners advances to the Quarter-finals

Team	Pld	W	D	L	GF	GA	GD	Pts
IFK Norrköping	3	2	1	0	6	0	+6	7
Mjällby AIF	3	1	1	1	4	3	+1	4
Landskrona BoIS	3	1	1	1	3	4	–1	4
Ängelholms FF	3	0	1	2	2	8	–6	1

2 March 2013 Match Day 1	IFK Norrköping	0 – 0	Landskrona BoIS	Norrköping, Östergötland County
13.00		Report		Stadium: Idrottsparken; Attendance: 1,453; Referee: Stefan Johannesson, Täby

9 March 2013 Match Day 2	Mjällby AIF	3 – 0	Landskrona BoIS	Asarum, Blekinge County
14.00	Pode 62'; Ekenberg 68', 90+3' (pen.)	Report		Stadium: Asarums IP (Artificial turf pitch); Attendance: 402; Referee: Robert Daradic, Helsingborg

16 March 2013 Match Day 3	Landskrona BoIS	3 – 1	Ängelholms FF	Landskrona, Skåne County
15:00	Olsson 52'; Nilsson 56'; Tkacz 60'	Report	Asanovski 73'	Stadium: Landskrona IP (Artificial turf pitch); Attendance: Unknown; Referee: Jim Petersson, Motala

==== 2013–14 ====
The tournament continues into the 2014 season.

Kickoff times are in UTC+1.

===== Qualification stage =====
22 August 2013 Round 2	Hudiksvalls FF	1–1 (a.e.t.) (5–4 p)	Landskrona BoIS	Hudiksvall, Gävleborg County
18:00	Hafizović 113'	Report	Own goal 109'	Stadium: Glysisvallen; Attendance: 823; Referee: Mohammed Nablsi, Gävle
	Penalties
	C. Eriksson (penalty missed); Hafizović (penalty scored); Lööf (penalty scored); Kasimir (penalty scored); Broman (penalty scored); Roos (penalty scored)		(penalty missed) Karlsson; (penalty scored) Dahl; (penalty scored) Ralani; (penalty scored) Nilsson; (penalty scored) E. Andersson; (penalty missed) Malmqvist

== Non competitive ==
=== Pre-season ===
Kickoff times are in UTC+1 unless stated otherwise.

9 February 2013 Friendly	Varbergs BoIS FC	0 – 4	Landskrona BoIS	Tvååker, Sweden
14:00		Report	Ralani; Mijaljević; Rudolfsson; Mijaljević	Stadium: Övrevi IP (Artificial turf pitch)

16 February 2013 Friendly	Landskrona BoIS	4 – 2	Falkenbergs FF	Landskrona, Sweden
14.00	Nilsson 12', 20', 25'; Åström 40'	Report	Eliasson 50'; D. Svensson 63'	Stadium: Landskrona IP (Artificial turf pitch)

23 February 2013 Friendly	Landskrona BoIS (Sweden)	2 – 0	(Denmark) HB Køge	Landskrona, Sweden
14.00	Nilsson 49'; Karlsson 60' (pen.)	Report		Stadium: Landskrona IP (Artificial turf pitch)

23 March 2013 Friendly	RNK Split (Croatia)	2 – 1	(Sweden) Landskrona BoIS	Postira, Croatia
15.00	Pehar; Vitaić	Report	Ralani 80'	Stadium: Unknown

1 April 2013 Friendly	Landskrona BoIS	1 – 2	Husqvarna FF	Häljarp, Sweden
13.30	(o.g.) 13'	Report	Tegström 56'; Haidari 62'	Stadium: Häljarps IP (Artificial turf pitch)
