= List of record home attendances of Swedish football clubs =

This is a list of record home attendances of Swedish football clubs. It lists the highest attendance of all 60 Swedish Allsvenskan, Superettan, and Division 1 clubs for a home match. In several cases records were achieved at a former ground rather than the club's current location. For example, IF Elfsborg's record was set at Ryavallen, not their current home, the Borås Arena.

== Records ==
=== Current teams ===
Rank	Club	Attendance	Stadium	Opposition	Competition	Date	Ref
1	IFK Göteborg	52,194	Nya Ullevi	Örgryte IS	Allsvenskan	3 June 1959	
2	GAIS	50,690	Nya Ullevi	IFK Göteborg	Division 2 Södra	20 May 1956	
3	AIK	50,128	Friends Arena	Sundsvall	Allsvenskan	4 November 2018	
4	Djurgårdens IF	48,894	Råsunda Stadium	IFK Göteborg	Allsvenskan	11 October 1959	
5	Örgryte IS	46,405	Nya Ullevi	Landskrona BoIS	Allsvenskan relegation play-offs	11 October 1958	
6	Hammarby IF	35,929	Råsunda Stadium	IFK Lidingö	Division 2 Norra	14 September 1941	
7	IFK Norrköping	32,234	Idrottsparken	Malmö FF	Allsvenskan	7 June 1956	
8	Malmö FF	29,328	Malmö Stadion	Helsingborgs IF	Allsvenskan	24 September 1967	
9	Östers IF	26,404	Värendsvallen	IK Brage	Allsvenskan relegation play-offs	2 October 1967	
10	Helsingborgs IF	26,143	Olympia	Malmö FF	Allsvenskan	14 May 1954	
11	IF Elfsborg	22,654	Ryavallen	IFK Norrköping	Allsvenskan	3 September 1961	
12	Degerfors IF	21,065	Stora Valla	IFK Norrköping		1 September 1963	
13	Halmstads BK	20,314	Örjans Vall	Djurgårdens IF	Allsvenskan	10 June 1955	
14	Sandvikens IF	20,288		IFK Norrköping	Allsvenskan	1957	
15	Örebro SK	20,046	Eyravallen	Degerfors IF	Allsvenskan	8 October 1961	
16	BK Häcken	19,185	Nya Ullevi	IF Elfsborg	Allsvenskan relegation play-offs	18 October 1981	
17	Jönköpings Södra IF	18,732	Stadsparksvallen	Malmö FF		23 April 1950	
18	Landskrona BoIS	18,535		Degerfors IF		18 October 1959	
19	FC Linköping City	17,944	Folkungavallen	Åtvidabergs FF	Allsvenskan	17 May 1973	
20	Norrby IF	17,391	Ryavallen	IF Elfsborg	Division 2 Västra Götaland	1 September 1957	
21	GIF Sundsvall	16,507		Högadals IS	Allsvenskan relegation play-offs	15 October 1961	
22	Kalmar FF	15,093		Malmö FF	Allsvenskan	2 September 1949	
23	IF Brommapojkarna	15,092	Råsunda Stadium	Djurgårdens IF	Allsvenskan	6 April 2007	
24	Västerås SK	14,424	Arosvallen	Sandvikens IF	Allsvenskan	6 May 1956	
25	Assyriska FF	14,232	Råsunda Stadium	Hammarby IF	Allsvenskan	12 April 2005	
26	IK Brage	14,076		GAIS	Allsvenskan relegation play-offs	17 October 1965	
27	Skövde AIK	13,239		IFK Luleå			
28	IK Sirius	12,546	Studenternas IP	Landskrona BoIS	Allsvenskan relegation play-offs	13 October 1968	
29	Umeå FC	12,127	Gammliavallen	IFK Göteborg	Allsvenskan	4 September 1996	
30	Åtvidabergs FF	11,049	Kopparvallen	IFK Norrköping	Allsvenskan	5 May 1968	
31	IK Oddevold	10,605	Rimnersvallen	IFK Göteborg	Allsvenskan	2 May 1996	
32	Trelleborgs FF	9,790		Åtvidabergs FF	Allsvenskan relegation play-offs	28 October 1984	
33	AFC Eskilstuna	8,672	Råsunda Stadium	AIK	Superettan	15 August 2005	
34	Mjällby AIF	8,438	Strandvallen	Kalmar FF	Allsvenskan	13 April 1980	
35	Östersunds FK	8,369	Jämtkraft Arena	IFK Norrköping	Svenska Cupen	13 April 2017	
36	Gefle IF	7,644	Strömvallen	IFK Göteborg	Allsvenskan	2 October 1983	
37	Ljungskile SK	7,128	Starke Arvid Arena	IFK Göteborg	Allsvenskan	25 April 2008	
38	Syrianska FC	6,963	Södertälje Fotbollsarena	Assyriska FF		27 September 2009	
39	Lunds BK	5,586	Klostergårdens IP	Malmö FF	Svenska Cupen	29 August 1985	
40	Falkenbergs FF	5,406	Falkenbergs IP	IF Elfsborg	Allsvenskan	21 April 2014	
41	Varbergs BoIS	5,197		IFK Göteborg		7 May 1939	
42	IFK Värnamo	4,594	Finnvedsvallen	Gnosjö IF	Division 2	3 June 1968	
43	Husqvarna FF	4,300	Vapenvallen	Jönköpings Södra IF		2004	
44	BK Forward	4,149		Örebro SK		31 May 1987	
45	Ängelholms FF	3,544	Ängelholms IP	Hammarby IF		22 October 2011	
46	Eskilsminne IF	3,011	Harlyckans IP	Djurgårdens IF	Svenska Cupen 2d round	11 September 2013	
47	Utsiktens BK	2,151	Ruddalens IP	Örgryte IS	Division 1	20 May 2012	
48	IK Frej	2,012	Vikingavallen	Akropolis IF	Superettan relegation play-offs	8 November 2016	
49	Dalkurd FF	1,420	Domnarvsvallen	IFK Värnamo	Superettan relegation play-offs	6 November 2013	
	Akropolis IF						
	Arameisk-Syrianska IF						
	Carlstad United BK						
	FK Karlskrona						
	Grebbestads IF						
	Karlslunds IF						
	Kristianstad FC						
	Nyköpings BIS						
	Oskarshamns AIK						
	Rynninge IK						
	Skellefteå FF						
	Sollentuna FK						
	Team TG FF						
	Torns IF						
	Tvååkers IF						

=== Current lower-level teams ===
Rank	Club	Attendance	Stadium	Opposition	Competition	Date	Ref
	IFK Malmö	27,210	Malmö Stadion	Malmö FF	Allsvenskan	1960	
	Råå IF	23,604	Olympia	Malmö FF	Allsvenskan	29 October 1950	
	IFK Eskilstuna	22,491	Tunavallen	GAIS		1963	
	IS Halmia	20,381	Örjans Vall	Landskrona BoIS	Allsvenskan relegation play-offs	13 October 1962	
	IK Sleipner	17,391	Norrköpings Idrottspark	IK Brage	Allsvenskan	18 April 1938	
	Högadals IS	14,564	Vägga IP	Östers IF	Allsvenskan relegation play-offs	1961	
	IFK Luleå	13,645	Skogsvallen	IF Elfsborg	Allsvenskan relegation play-offs	16 October 1960	
	IK City	13,038	Tunavallen	IFK Eskilstuna	Division 2	1955	
	Motala AIF	12,863	Motala Idrottspark	Örgryte IS	Allsvenskan relegation play-offs	2 June 1957	
	Västra Frölunda IF	12,486		IFK Göteborg	Division 2 Södra	5 June 1975	
	IF Sylvia	11,114	Norrköpings Idrottspark	IFK Norrköping	Superettan	3 May 2007	
	BK Derby	11,106	Folkungavallen	Motala AIF		1954	
	IFK Sundsvall	10,650	Sundsvalls Idrottspark	IFK Norrköping	Allsvenskan	16 May 1976	
	Kalmar AIK	10,259	Fredriksskans	Kalmar FF	Division 2 Södra	1983	
	Karlstad BK	10,014	Tingvalla IP	Degerfors IF	Division 2 Norra	1980	
	Vasalunds IF	9,115	Skytteholms IP	Liverpool FC		1989	
	Enköpings SK	9,102	Enavallen	Djurgårdens IF	Allsvenskan	11 May 2003	
	IFK Hässleholm	8,500	Österås IP	Degerfors IF	Allsvenskan relegation play-offs	1993	
	Bodens BK	6,459	Björknäsvallen	AIK	Superettan	4 September 2005	
	Syrianska IF Kerburan	6,441	Swedbank Park	Västerås SK	Division 1 Norra	5 September 2010	
	Sundbybergs IK	5,745	Sundbybergs IP	AIK	Division 2	1 August 1962	
	IFK Östersund	5,355	Hofvallen	Marma IF	Division 2 Norrland	5 October 1957	
	IFK Uddevalla	3,703	Rimnersvallen	IFK Göteborg	Svenska Cupen	25 July 1993	
	Qviding FIF	2,350		Syrianska FC		2005	
