= Billingsfors Church =

Billingsfors kyrka
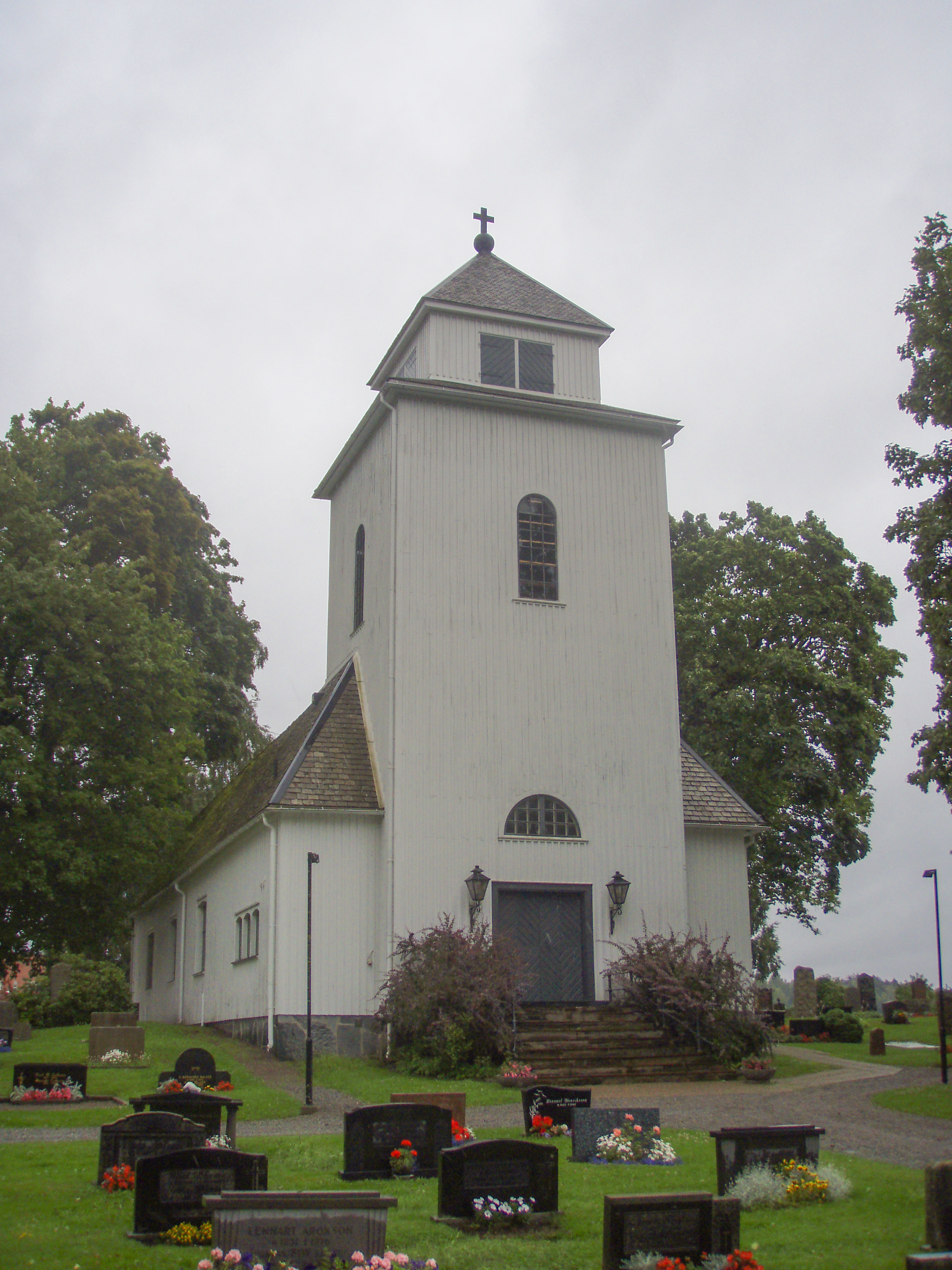

- Location of Tisselskog Church in Västra Götaland County
- 58°59′13.01″N 12°15′16.29″E
- Location: Billingsfors, Västra Götaland County
- Country: Sweden
- Denomination: Church of Sweden

History
- Consecrated: 1763

Billingsfors Church (Swedish: Billingsfors kyrka) belongs to the Steneby-Tisselskogs parish in the Diocese of Karlstad, Sweden. It is situated close to the paper mill in Billingsfors.The church was built in 1763. It was originally owned by the Billingsfors factory and was probably built by the carpenters at the factory. Since 1981, it is owned by the Steneby parish (now Steneby-Tissleskogs parish). At the time of the transfer of the ownership, it had been owned by the factory for 218 year and was one of the last privately owned churches remaining in Sweden.

The altarpiece was painted in the 16th century by Jan van Scorel. Among the inventories are a crucifix from the 16th century and a positive organ that was in use until the end of the 1880s. The present organ was built in 1954. The church was comprehensively renovated in 1991, when an additional choir (architecture) organ, made by Göran Strand, was installed.
