= Norra IP =

Sports ground in Sandviken, Sweden

- Location: Sandviken, Sweden
- Type: sports ground

Tenant
- Sandvikens IF

Norra IP was a football stadium in Sandviken, Sweden and the former home stadium for the football team Sandvikens IF.
