= Ärtemarks IF =

Swedish sports club

- Full name: Ärtemarks idrottsförening
- Sport: soccer table tennis (earlier)
- Based in: Ärtemark, Sweden

Ärtemarks IF is a sports club in Ärtemark, Sweden. The club's table tennis section won the Swedish women's national championships during the seasons of 2005–2006 and 2006–2007. The men's team qualified for the 2007–2008 Elitserien and even played som home games in the People's Republic of China. In 2014, the club's table tennis activity was transferred over to Dals BTK.
