= Luka Mijaljević =

Swedish footballer

Personal information
- Full name: Luka Mijaljević
- Date of birth: 9 March 1991 (age 35)
- Place of birth: Backa, Gothenburg, Sweden
- Height: 1.88 m (6 ft 2 in)
- Position: Forward

Youth career
- 1999–2006: KF Velebit

Senior career*
| Years | Team | Apps | (Gls) |
| 2006–2009 | KF Velebit | | |
| 2010–2011 | Örgryte IS | 21 | (2) |
| 2011 | NK Istra 1961 | 6 | (1) |
| 2012–2013 | Landskrona BoIS | 24 | (5) |
| 2013 | Ljungskile SK | 10 | (1) |
| 2014–2015 | Utsiktens BK | 55 | (33) |
| 2016–2017 | GAIS | 54 | (18) |
| 2018–2019 | AFC Eskilstuna | 4 | (0) |
| 2020 | FK Ekipa | 4 | (0) |
- * Club domestic league appearances and goals

Luka Mijaljević (born 9 March 1991) is a Swedish footballer who plays as a forward.

== Personal life ==
Born in Sweden, Mijaljević is of Croatian descent.
