= Lövåsvallen =

Football stadium in Billingsfors, Sweden

Coordinates: 58°59′13″N 12°14′38″E

Lövåsvallen is a football stadium in Billingsfors, Sweden and the home stadium for the football team Billingsfors IK.
