= Ivo Vazgeč =

Bosnian-born Swedish footballer (born 1986)

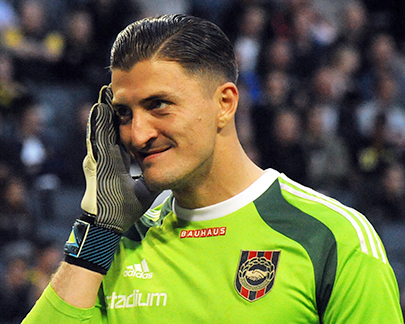

Personal information
- Full name: Ivo Vazgeč
- Date of birth: 6 February 1986 (age 40)
- Place of birth: Kakanj, SFR Yugoslavia
- Height: 1.90 m (6 ft 3 in)
- Position: Goalkeeper

Youth career
- Nässjö FF

Senior career*
Years	Team	Apps	(Gls)
2006–2007	Jönköpings Södra	41	(0)
2008	Larisa	0	(0)
2008	AaB Aalborg	0	(0)
2008	Assyriska FF	2	(0)
2009	IFK Norrköping	11	(0)
2009–2010	Śląsk Wrocław	7	(0)
2011	Jönköpings Södra	14	(0)
2011–2012	Landskrona	39	(0)
2013–2014	Brommapojkarna	31	(0)
2015	Ljungskile	15	(0)
2016	Husqvarna	25	(0)
2017	Landskrona	26	(0)
2018	Assyriska FF	3	(0)
2021	Assyriska Turabdin	11	(0)

International career
2006	Sweden U21	1	(0)
- * Club domestic league appearances and goals as of 5 December 2017

Ivo Vazgeč (born 6 February 1986) is a Bosnian-born Swedish retired football goalkeeper of Bosnian Croat heritage.

== Career ==
Vazgeč joined the Polish team Śląsk Wrocław in 2009 from IFK Norrköping. He liked the mentality in Poland, not being content with anything but a victory, and where players risked being confronted in the street if they went out on town after a loss. He played one game for the Swedish U21 national football team in 2006.

In 2014, Vazgec had an altercation with a man in a McDonald's. As police was called to the scene, Vazgec was handcuffed, later convicted for "verbal abuse" and "threats" and sentenced to fines and reparations. He left IF Brommapojkarna after 2014, and in 2015 his only football experience was a short-term contract with Ljungskile SK. Vazgec later stated that his "reputation went to hell", but that Brommapojkarna "fucked with me". Vazgec had to go down to the third tier to find a club in 2016, that being Husqvarna FF.

In 2017, Vazgec held 17 clean sheets for Landskrona BoIS as the team won promotion to the 2018 Superettan. An attempt to extend the contract was not successful. He signed for Assyriska FF in early June 2018. Only four days later, it was reported that Vazgec was indicted for driving under the influence, whereupon the club would release him as soon as the transfer window opened.
