= Cheikh Tidiane Sarr =

Danish footballer (born 1987)

Cheikh Sarr
Personal information
- Full name: Cheikh Tidiane Sarr
- Date of birth: 15 March 1987 (age 39)
- Place of birth: Copenhagen, Denmark
- Height: 1.82 m (6 ft 0 in)
- Position: Right-back

Youth career
- Lundtofte Boldklub
- Lyngby
- 2003–2004: Bordeaux

Senior career*
Years	Team	Apps	(Gls)
2004–2005	Lyngby	11	(0)
2006–2009	AGF	13	(0)
2009–2011	Lyngby	42	(0)
2011–2012	Hammarby IF	4	(0)
2012	Brønshøj	7	(0)
2012	FK Jerv	8	(0)
2013–2014	Brønshøj	0	(0)
2014–2015	Landskrona BoIS	20	(0)
2016	Höganäs BK	6	(0)
Total		111	(0)

International career
2005–2006	Denmark U19	4	(0)

Managerial career
- 2017–2018: Landskrona BoIS U19
- * Club domestic league appearances and goals

Cheikh Tidiane Sarr (born 15 March 1987), commonly known as Cheikh Sarr, is a Danish former professional footballer who last worked as a coach of Landskrona BoIS U19.

== Playing career ==
Sarr progressed through the youth teams of Lyngby before joining Ligue 1 club Bordeaux in 2003. He returned to Lyngby after two years, where he made his professional debut in a 6–2 win in the Danish Cup over Taastrup FC on 9 August 2005.

On 28 November 2005, Sarr signed a four-year contract with Danish Superliga club AGF. He made his debut in the top tier on 11 March 2006, starting in a 1–1 home draw against SønderjyskE.

Sarr terminated his contract with AGF by mutual consent on 8 January 2009, after losing his spot in the first team. He returned to his former club Lyngby the same day, signing a two-and-a-half-year deal with the club.

He signed a short-term contract with the Stockholm-based club Hammarby IF, on 22 August 2011, after his release from Lyngby. He made his debut for the club on 4 September, coming off the bench for David Lidholm in the 63rd minute in a 3–2 away loss in Superettan to Degerfors IF.

After less than a season with Hammarby, Sarr returned to Denmark where he played for Brønshøj in the spring of 2012. In August 2012, Sarr joined FK Jerv, debuting in the Norwegian Second Division on 1 September in a 1–1 home draw against FK Vidar. He played for Jerv for the remainder of 2012, where he left the club as a free agent. After nine months without a club, and trials in Norway, Sweden and the Faroe Islands, Sarr returned to Brønshøj on 26 September 2013.

In February 2014, Sarr joined Landskrona BoIS on a six-month deal. He played two years for the club, before moving to Höganäs BK in December 2015 in Division 2, the fourth tier of Swedish football.

== Coaching career ==
On 1 November 2017, Sarr was appointed coach of the under-19 team of Landskrona BoIS.
