= Billingsfors IK =

Swedish football club

- Full name: Billingsfors Idrottsklubb
- Nickname: BIK
- Founded: 26 May 1906
- Ground: Lövåsvallen; Billingsfors; Sweden
- Chairman: Göran Hansson
- Youth coach: Pontus Nordwall, Alassane Ouarma
- Website: http://www.billingsforsik.net/
Home colours

Billingsfors IK is a Swedish football club located in Billingsfors, close to Bengtsfors, Västra Götaland County.

== Background ==
Billingsfors Idrottsklubb was founded on 26 May 1906 and played one season in the Allsvenskan, the highest Swedish league, in 1946–47. BIK were relegated at the end of the season, finishing bottom of the table with just three draws. While the club is positioned last in the all-time Allsvenskan table it is a great achievement for BIK to have played at this level.

In their early years Billingsfors IK participated mainly in the upper divisions of the Swedish football league system but then their fortunes plummeted and in recent decades they have been entrenched in the lower divisions. Since 2012 the club has had no senior team of its own. They played as a combined team with Ärtemarks IF between 2014 and 2020, when Ärtemarks ended the collaboration to focus on developing its own team.

Now they only have a youth section. They play their home matches at the Lövåsvallen stadium in Billingsfors.

Billingsfors IK are affiliated to the Dalslands Fotbollförbund.

== Season to season ==
In their early history Billingsfors IK competed in the following divisions:

Season	Level	Division	Section	Position	Movements
1931–32	Tier 3	Division 3	Nordvästra	1st	Promoted
1932–33	Tier 2	Division 2	Västra	3rd	
1933–34	Tier 2	Division 2	Västra	6th	
1934–35	Tier 2	Division 2	Västra	3rd	
1935–36	Tier 2	Division 2	Västra	1st	Promotion Playoffs
1936–37	Tier 2	Division 2	Västra	4th	
1937–38	Tier 2	Division 2	Västra	4th	
1938–39	Tier 2	Division 2	Västra	5th	
1939–40	Tier 2	Division 2	Västra	8th	
1940–41	Tier 2	Division 2	Västra	8th	
1941–42	Tier 2	Division 2	Västra	5th	
1942–43	Tier 2	Division 2	Västra	4th	
1943–44	Tier 2	Division 2	Västra	1st	Promotion Playoffs
1944–45	Tier 2	Division 2	Västra	7th	
1945–46	Tier 2	Division 2	Västra	1st	Promotion Playoffs – Promoted
1946–47	Tier 1	Allsvenskan		12th	Relegated
1947–48	Tier 2	Division 2	Sydvästra	8th	
1948–49	Tier 2	Division 2	Sydvästra	10th	Relegated
1949–50	Tier 3	Division 3	Västra	9th	Relegated

In recent seasons Billingsfors IK have competed in the following divisions:

Season	Level	Division	Section	Position	Movements
1999	Tier 6	Division 5	Dalsland	9th	
2000	Tier 6	Division 5	Dalsland	11th	Relegated
2001	Tier 7	Division 6	Dalsland	4th	
2002	Tier 7	Division 6	Dalsland	9th	
2003	Tier 7	Division 6	Dalsland	5th	
2004	Tier 7	Division 6	Dalsland	1st	Promoted
2005	Tier 6	Division 5	Dalsland	11th	
2006*	Tier 7	Division 5	Dalsland	10th	
2007	Tier 7	Division 5	Dalsland	12th	Relegated
2008	Tier 8	Division 6	Dalsland	6th	
2009	Tier 8	Division 6	Dalsland	9th	
2010	Tier 8	Division 6	Dalsland	9th	
2011	Tier 8	Division 6	Dalsland		

* League restructuring in 2006 resulted in a new division being created at Tier 3 and subsequent divisions dropping a level.

== Achievements ==
- Allsvenskan:
  - Best placement (12th): 1946–47

== Attendances ==
In recent seasons Billingsfors IK have had the following average attendances:

Season	Average attendance	Division / Section	Level
2009	Not available	Div 6 Dalsland	Tier 8
2010	70	Div 6 Dalsland	Tier 8

* Attendances are provided in the Publikliga sections of the Svenska Fotbollförbundet website.

On 30 May 2006 a strengthened Billingsfors IK played GAIS in a jubilee match to celebrate BIK's 100-year anniversary in 2006. The match was a great spectacle with almost 850 paying spectators at the Lövåsvallen.

== Players ==
- Ingvar Rydell – Played for Billingsfors IK when the team played in the Allsvenskan. He then went to Malmö FF and was the Allsvenskan top-scorer in the 1949–50 season. He also played in the Sweden national team.
