= Högadals IS =

Swedish football club

- Full name: Högadals Idrottssällskap
- Founded: 1921
- Ground: Vägga IP; Karlshamn; Sweden
- Chairman: Anna-Carin Zielinsk
- League: Division 4 Blekinge
- 2019: 7th
- Website: http://www3.idrottonline.se/default.aspx?id=58689
Home colours	Away colours

Högadals IS is a Swedish football club located in Karlshamn.

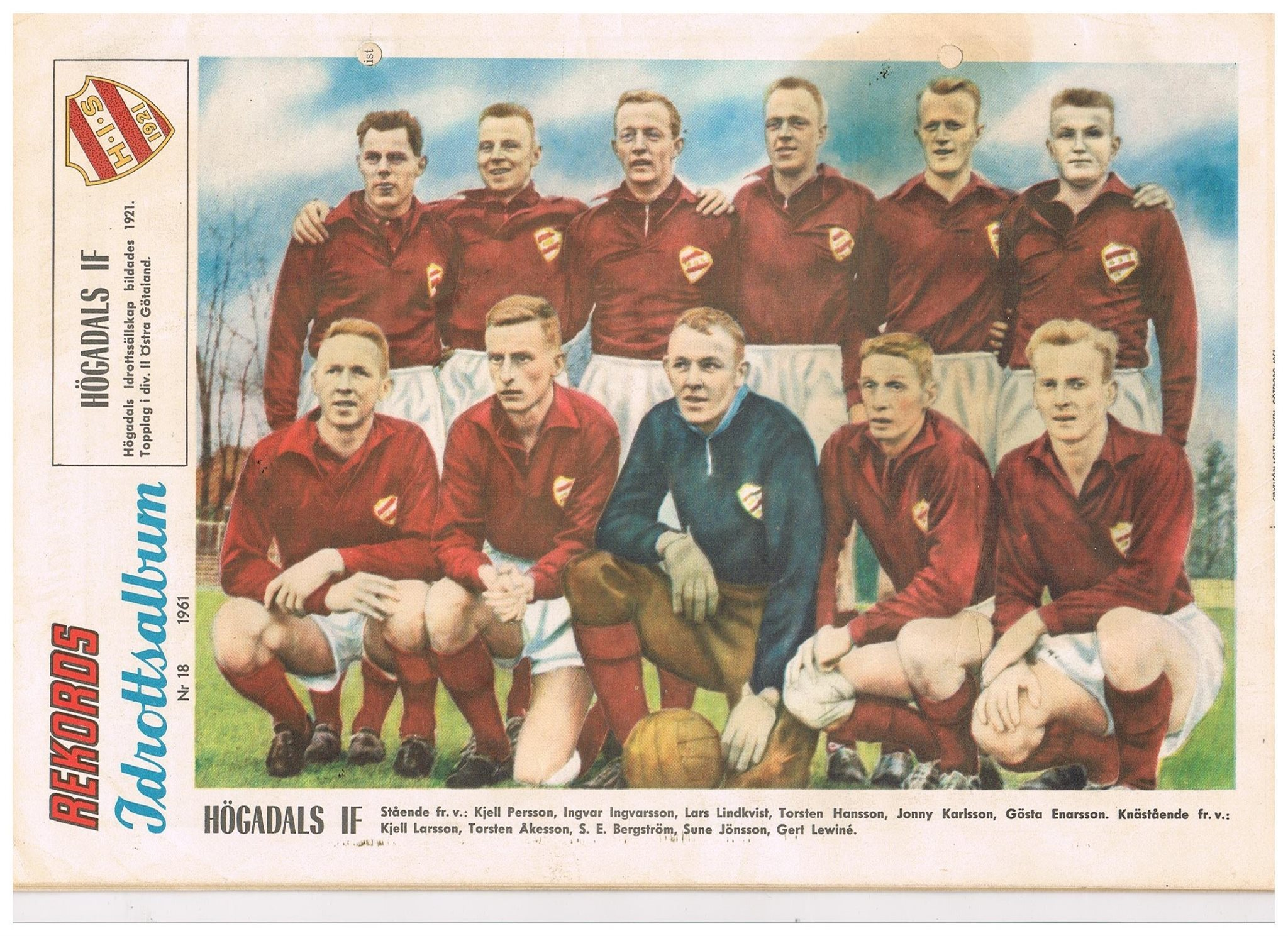
Burgundy red Högadal from Blekinge during the heyday, when they advanced to the top division Allsvenskan.

== Background ==
Högadals IS currently plays in Division 4 Blekinge which is the sixth tier of Swedish football. The club competed in the Allsvenskan for one season in 1962. They play their home matches at the Vägga IP in Karlshamn.

The club is affiliated to Blekinge Fotbollförbund. Högadals IS have competed in the Svenska Cupen on 19 occasions and have played 43 matches in the competition.

The club also has a bandy team.

== Season to season ==
Season	Level	Division	Section	Position	Movements
1952–53	Tier 4	Division 4	Blekinge		Promoted
1953–54	Tier 3	Division 3	Östra Götaland	10th	Relegated
1954–55	Tier 4	Division 4	Blekinge		Promoted
1955–56	Tier 3	Division 3	Sydöstra Götaland	2nd	
1956–57	Tier 3	Division 3	Sydöstra Götaland	2nd	
1957–58	Tier 3	Division 3	Sydöstra Götaland	1st	Promoted
1959	Tier 2	Division 2	Östra Götaland	3rd	
1960	Tier 2	Division 2	Östra Götaland	3rd	
1961	Tier 2	Division 2	Östra Götaland	1st	Promotion Playoffs – Promoted
1962	Tier 1	Allsvenskan		12th	Relegated
1963	Tier 2	Division 2	Östra Götaland	5th	
1964	Tier 2	Division 2	Östra Götaland	4th	
1965	Tier 2	Division 2	Östra Götaland	11th	Relegated
1966	Tier 3	Division 3	Sydöstra Götaland	8th	
1967	Tier 3	Division 3	Sydöstra Götaland	2nd	
1968	Tier 3	Division 3	Sydöstra Götaland	4th	
1969	Tier 3	Division 3	Sydöstra Götaland	2nd	
1970	Tier 3	Division 3	Sydöstra Götaland	6th	
1971	Tier 3	Division 3	Sydöstra Götaland	5th	
1972	Tier 3	Division 3	Sydöstra Götaland	12th	Relegated
1973	Tier 4	Division 4	Blekinge	1st	Promoted
1974	Tier 3	Division 3	Sydöstra Götaland	6th	
1975	Tier 3	Division 3	Sydöstra Götaland	5th	
1976	Tier 3	Division 3	Sydöstra Götaland	10th	Relegated
1977	Tier 4	Division 4	Blekinge	1st	Promoted
1978	Tier 3	Division 3	Sydöstra Götaland	7th	
1979	Tier 3	Division 3	Sydöstra Götaland	4th	
1980	Tier 3	Division 3	Sydöstra Götaland	6th	
1981	Tier 3	Division 3	Sydöstra Götaland	3rd	
1982	Tier 3	Division 3	Sydöstra Götaland	9th	
1983	Tier 3	Division 3	Sydöstra Götaland	8th	
1984	Tier 3	Division 3	Sydöstra Götaland	4th	
1985	Tier 3	Division 3	Sydöstra Götaland	5th	
1986	Tier 3	Division 3	Sydöstra Götaland	9th	
1987	Tier 4	Division 3	Sydöstra Götaland	5th	
1988	Tier 4	Division 3	Sydöstra Götaland	8th	
1989	Tier 4	Division 3	Sydöstra Götaland	7th	
1990	Tier 4	Division 3	Sydöstra Götaland	9th	
1991	Tier 4	Division 3	Sydöstra Götaland	9th	
1992	Tier 4	Division 3	Sydöstra Götaland A	6th	Vårserier (Spring Series)
1992	Tier 4	Division 3	Sydöstra Götaland	11th	Höstserier (Autumn Series) – Relegated
1993	Tier 5	Division 4	Blekinge	9th	
1994	Tier 5	Division 4	Blekinge	10th	Relegation Playoffs – Relegated
1995	Tier 6	Division 5	Blekinge		Promoted
1996	Tier 5	Division 4	Blekinge	9th	
1997	Tier 5	Division 4	Blekinge	7th	
1998	Tier 5	Division 4	Blekinge	1st	Promoted
1999	Tier 4	Division 3	Sydöstra Götaland	9th	Relegated
2000	Tier 5	Division 4	Blekinge	2nd	Promoted
2001	Tier 4	Division 3	Sydöstra Götaland	11th	Relegated
2002	Tier 5	Division 4	Blekinge	6th	
2003	Tier 5	Division 4	Blekinge	2nd	Promotion Playoffs
2004	Tier 5	Division 4	Blekinge	4th	
2005	Tier 5	Division 4	Blekinge	2nd	Playoffs
2006*	Tier 5	Division 3	Sydöstra Götaland	11th	Relegated
2007	Tier 6	Division 4	Blekinge	8th	
2008	Tier 6	Division 4	Blekinge	5th	
2009	Tier 6	Division 4	Blekinge	6th	
2010	Tier 6	Division 4	Blekinge	9th	
2011	Tier 6	Division 4	Blekinge	12th	Relegated
2012	Tier 7	Division 5	Blekinge	6th	
2013	Tier 7	Division 5	Blekinge	1st	Promoted
2014	Tier 6	Division 4	Blekinge	2nd	Promotion Playoffs - Not Promoted
2015	Tier 6	Division 4	Blekinge	12th	Relegated
2016	Tier 7	Division 5	Blekinge	1st	Promoted
2017	Tier 6	Division 4	Blekinge	5th	
2018	Tier 6	Division 4	Blekinge	3rd	
2019	Tier 6	Division 4	Blekinge	7th	
2020	Tier 6	Division 4	Blekinge		

* League restructuring in 2006 resulted in a new division being created at Tier 3 and subsequent divisions dropping a level.
