= Andreas Dahl =

Swedish football player

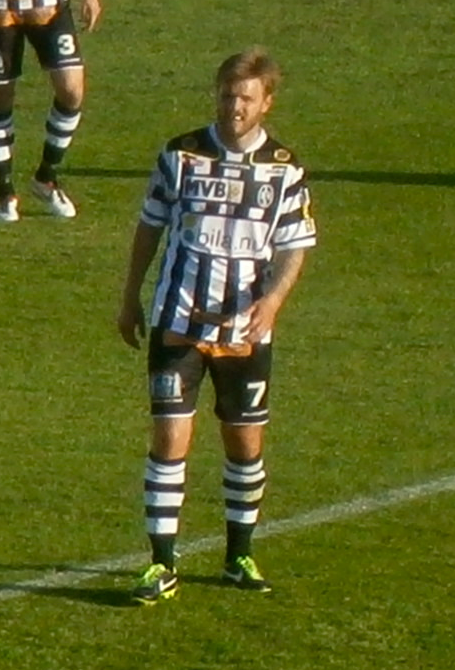
- Dahl playing for Landskrona BoIS in 2013.

Personal information
- Full name: Rolf Åke Andreas Dahl
- Date of birth: 6 June 1984 (age 42)
- Place of birth: Hässleholm, Sweden
- Height: 1.80 m (5 ft 11 in)
- Position: Midfielder

Youth career
- 1990–2000: IFK Hässleholm

Senior career*
Years	Team	Apps	(Gls)
1999	IFK Hässleholm	18	(2)
2000–2001	Coventry City FC	0	(0)
2001–2007	Helsingborgs IF	111	(7)
2008–2009	FC Nordsjælland	38	(1)
2009–2012	Hammarby IF	85	(12)
2013–2014	Landskrona BoIS	54	(6)
Total		306	(28)

International career^{‡}
2001	Sweden U17	7	(2)
2003	Sweden U19	2	(0)
2002–2006	Sweden U21	15	(1)
2008–2009	Sweden	4	(0)
- * Club domestic league appearances and goals as of 14 January 2015 ‡ National team caps and goals as of 20 August 2013

Andreas Dahl (born 6 June 1984) is a Swedish former football player. He has previously spent one season at Coventry City F.C. Prior to that, he represented his home town club IFK Hässleholm. Dahl has made 15 matches for the Swedish under-21 national team.

It was announced August 2007 that Dahl has signed for FC Nordsjælland from Helsingborgs IF, a contract starting on 1 January 2008.

On 12 April in the match between Aab and Nordsjalland, a streaker invaded the pitch and Dahl took it upon himself to stop him. The Danish Premier League player says he has no regrets about kicking a streaker where it hurts, 'I know it's the stewards' job, but why shouldn't I be allowed to kick him in the balls? I just stuck out a leg and hit him straight in his special area. I guess it was a bit unfortunate for him, but it wasn't as if I was aiming. He sure went down fast.' This incident prompted comments by the Danish Press of the form 'Dahl is a player that keeps his eye on the balls".

On 26 June 2009 it was announced that he had signed a contract for 3.5 year with Hammarby IF, thus making his return in Allsvenskan.
