= Vägga IP =

Sports ground in Karlshamn, Sweden

Coordinates: 56°9′50″N 14°52′51″E

- Interactive map of Vägga IP
- Full name: Vägga Idrottsplats
- Location: Hunnemaravägen 30, 374 30, Karlshamn
- Owner: Karlshamn Municipality
- Surface: grass

Tenants
- Högadals IS; IFK Karlshamn

Vägga IP is a football stadium in Karlshamn, Sweden and the home stadium for the football teams Högadals IS and IFK Karlshamn.
