= Linus Malmqvist =

Swedish footballer

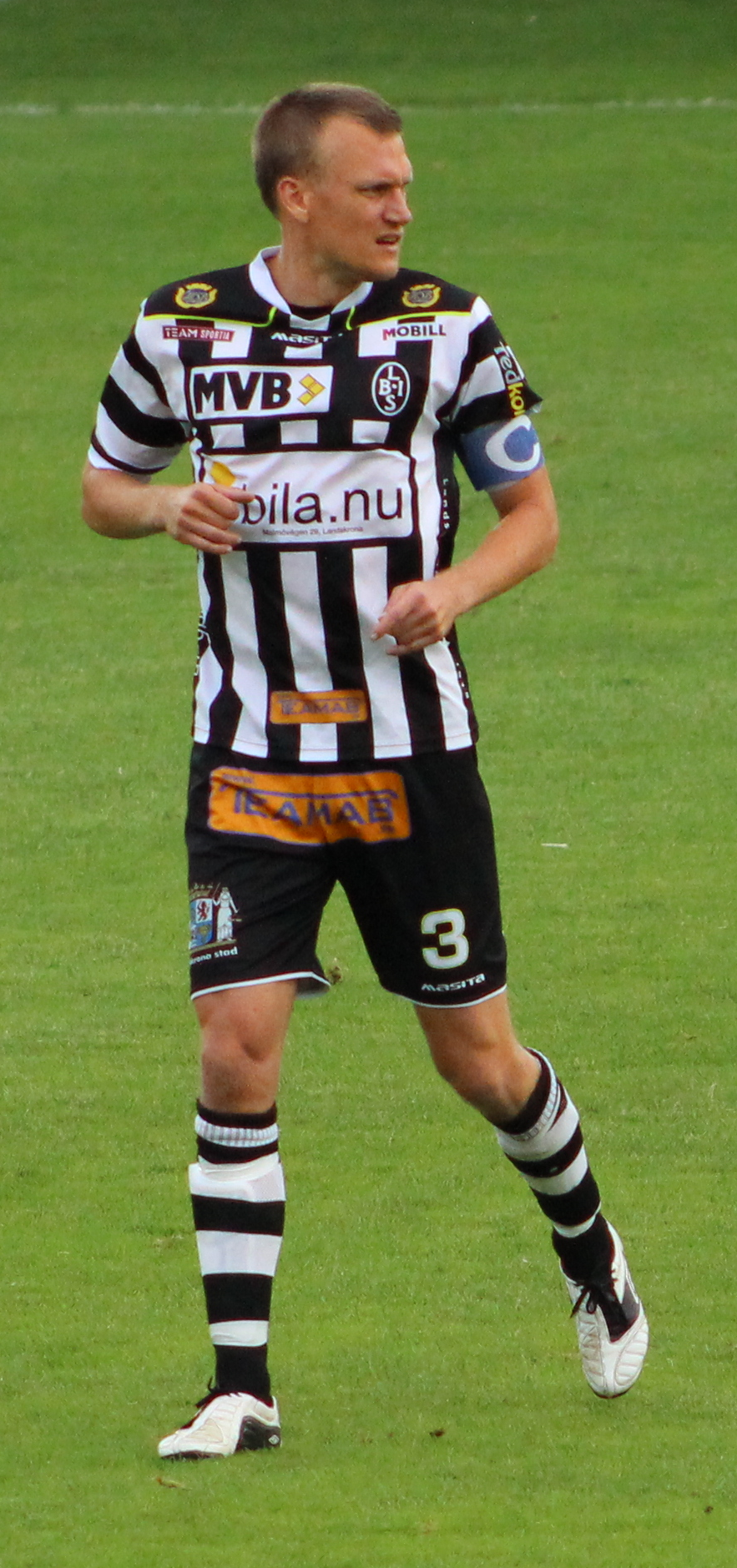
- Linus Malmqvist playing for Landskrona in 2013.

Personal information
- Full name: Linus Sebastian Malmqvist
- Date of birth: September 9, 1981 (age 45)
- Place of birth: Landskrona, Sweden
- Height: 1.87 m (6 ft 2 in)
- Position: Defender

Youth career
- BK Fram
- 1998–2000: Landskrona BoIS

Senior career*
Years	Team	Apps	(Gls)
2001–2004	Landskrona BoIS	17	(0)
2005	→ Trelleborgs FF (loan)	9	(2)
2006–2007	Trelleborgs FF	51	(3)
2008–2013	Landskrona BoIS	151	(3)
- * Club domestic league appearances and goals as of 22 November 2013

Linus Malmqvist (born September 9, 1981), is a former Swedish football player, who played ten seasons for Landskrona BoIS and three seasons for Trelleborgs FF between the years 2001 and 2013.

== Biography ==
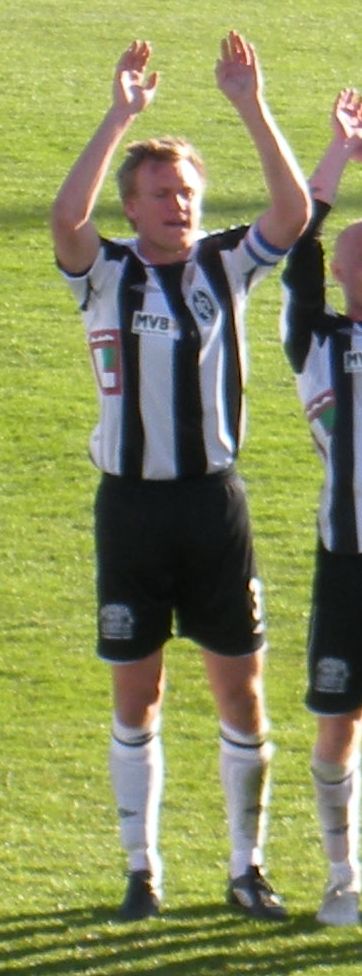
Linus Malmqvist salutes the Landskrona fans in 2008.

=== Landskrona BoIS ===
Malmqvist began his career in the Landskrona club BK Fram and joined Landskrona BoIS in 1999. He made his professional debut for Landskrona in a match in Superettan 2001, same year as BoIS became runners-up and was promoted to Allsvenskan again. The following three years in Allsvenskan Malmqvist played a total of 16 matches. To play some more matches, Malmqvist went on loan to the recently relegated Allsvenskan team Trelleborgs FF.

=== Trelleborgs FF ===
Despite only two games played from start during 2005 Malmqvist stayed in Trelleborg after his loan period had expired. The same year Trelleborg won Superettan, with Linus Malmqvist playing 29 matches from start. Trelleborg succeeded to avoid regulation in Allsvenskan 2007 and Malmqvist played 22 matchets, including the away game against IFK Gothenburg on Nya Ullevi where a crowd of 41,471 witnessed Gothenburg becoming Swedish champions.

=== Landskrona BoIS ===
Malmqvist returned to Landskrona in 2008, as a part of the campaign to reach Allsvenskan under the new coach Anders Linderoth. Malmqvist pretty soon became the club's captain. BoIS, however, came in eleventh place in 2008, and the following season in Superettan the team came in eighth place, which resulted in the sacking of coach Linderoth. A decision Malmqvist thought was good. The following three years BoIS were coached by Henrik Larsson and Malmqvist continued in 2010 and 2011 in his role as a regular central defender and team captain. In autumn 2011, he was however injured, which made him absent in much of the 2012 season. Superettan 2013 became Linus Malmqvist last season as a player in Landskrona BoIS, after having had constant pain in the right ankle and lower leg for two years. Malmqvist played 168 league matches and scored 3 goals in total for Landskrona BoIS.
