= Fredrik Olsson =

Swedish footballer

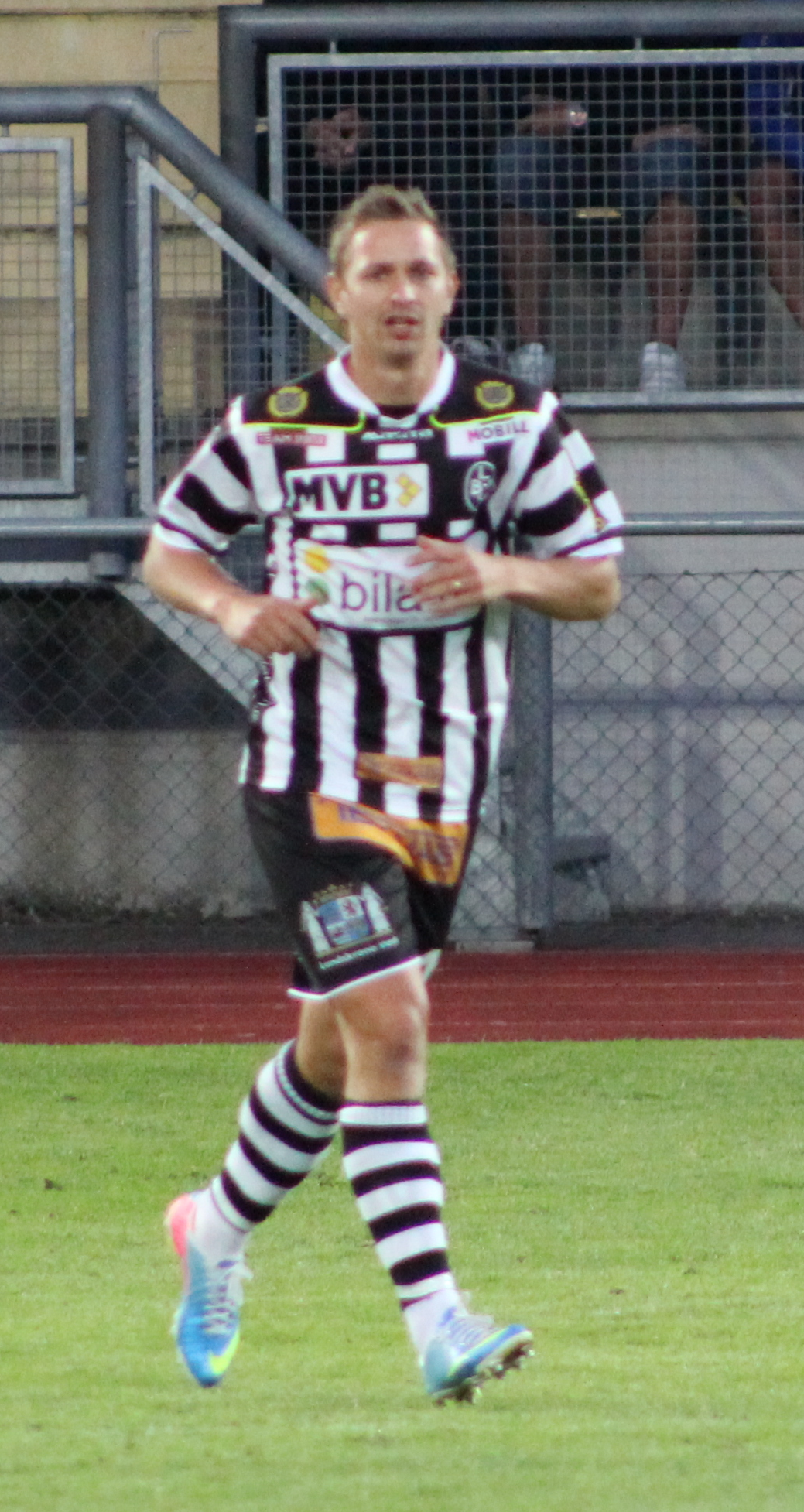
- Olsson, playing for Landskrona BoIS in 2013.

Personal information
- Full name: Karl Eric Fredrik Olsson
- Date of birth: February 4, 1985 (age 41)
- Place of birth: Karlshamn, Sweden
- Height: 1.75 m (5 ft 9 in)
- Position: Forward

Youth career
- 1991–2000: Mörrums GoIS
- 2001–2004: Mjällby AIF

Senior career*
| Years | Team | Apps | (Gls) |
| 2005–2006 | Mjällby AIF | 55 | (22) |
| 2007–2008 | Helsingborgs IF | 6 | (0) |
| 2008–2013 | Landskrona BoIS | 136 | (51) |
| 2014–2015 | Jönköpings Södra IF | 57 | (31) |
| 2016–2017 | Halmstads BK | 36 | (14) |
| 2017–2018 | Jönköpings Södra IF | 23 | (3) |

International career
| | Sweden U17 | 17 | (7) |
- * Club domestic league appearances and goals as of 4 February 2019

Fredrik Olsson (born 4 February 1985) is a Swedish football player, who most recently played for Jönköpings Södra IF. He has played six seasons for Landskrona BoIS, between 2008 and 2013. He made 136 appearances and scored 49 goals for Landskrona in total, and became the club's top scorer in 2009, 2011, 2012 and 2013. Prior to signing for BoIS, he played for the local rivals Helsingborgs IF and Mjällby AIF. He has made appearances for his country in different youth teams.
