= Billingsfors =

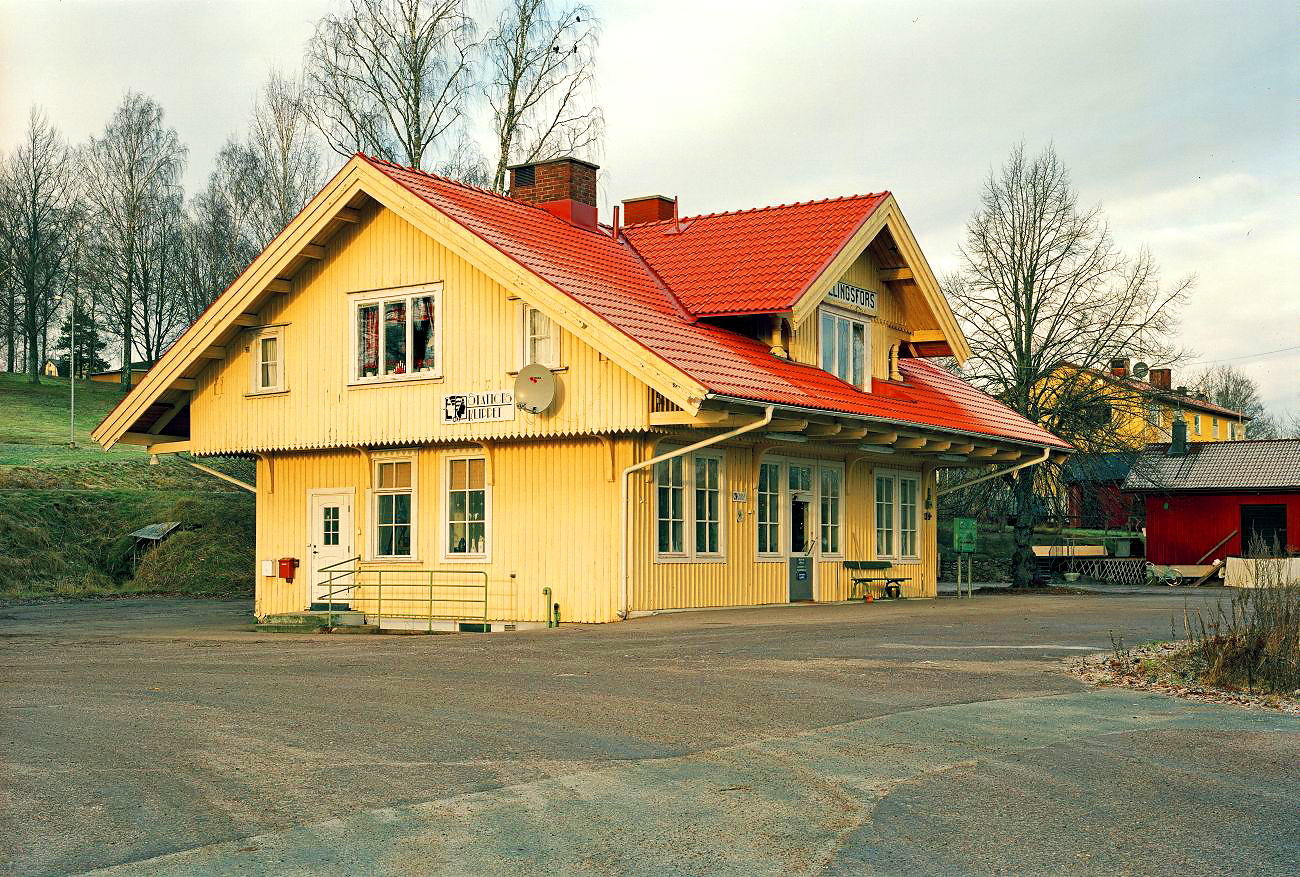

- Location within Västra Götaland Location within Sweden
- Coordinates: 58°59′N 12°15′E
- Country: Sweden
- Province: Dalsland
- County: Västra Götaland County
- Municipality: Bengtsfors Municipality

Area
  - Total: 2.32 km^{2} (0.90 sq mi)

Population (31 December 2010)
  - Total: 1,134
  - Density: 490/km^{2} (1,300/sq mi)
- Time zone: UTC+1 (CET)
  - Summer (DST): UTC+2 (CEST)
- Climate: Dfb

Billingsfors (Swedish pronunciation: [bɪlɪŋsˈfɔʂː]) is a locality situated in Bengtsfors Municipality, Västra Götaland County, Sweden. It had 1,134 inhabitants in 2010. Billingsfors Church is in Billingsfors.

== Sports ==
The following sports clubs are located in Billingsfors:

- Billingsfors IK
