= 1997 Division 3 (Swedish football) =

Swedish League Division 3
- Season: 1997
- Champions: Assi IF; Selånger FK; Söderhamns FF; Håbo FF; Värtans IK; Rynninge IK; Linköpings FF; Torslanda IK; IFK Fjärås; Åhus Horna IF; Skene IF; Ystads IF FF
- Promoted: 12 teams above and: Täfteå IK; Spånga IS FK; Olofströms IF
- Relegated: 44 teams

Statistics of Swedish football Division 3 for the 1997 season.

== League standings ==
=== Norra Norrland 1997 ===
Pos	Team	Pld	W	D	L	GF	GA	GD	Pts	Promotion or relegation
1	Assi IF, Kalix	22	14	4	4	50	28	+22	46	Promoted
2	Malmbergets AIF	22	12	6	4	51	24	+27	42	Promotion Playoffs
3	Hedens IF, Boden	22	11	4	7	56	40	+16	37	
4	Robertsfors IK	22	11	4	7	49	33	+16	37	
5	Luleå SK	22	8	7	7	49	40	+9	31	
6	Betsele IF	22	6	12	4	42	36	+6	30	
7	Rutviks SK	22	9	3	10	42	48	−6	30	
8	IFK Kalix	22	7	8	7	42	39	+3	29	
9	Storfors AIK	22	7	4	11	35	49	−14	25	Relegation Playoffs
10	IFK Arvidsjaur FK	22	6	5	11	40	61	−21	23	Relegated
11	Sunnanå SK	22	6	4	12	29	53	−24	22	Relegated
12	Blattnicksele IF	22	2	5	15	30	64	−34	11	Relegated

=== Mellersta Norrland 1997 ===
Pos	Team	Pld	W	D	L	GF	GA	GD	Pts	Promotion or relegation
1	Selånger FK, Sundsvall	22	16	4	2	65	19	+46	52	Promoted
2	Täfteå IK	22	16	4	2	53	11	+42	52	Promotion Playoffs – Promoted
3	Anundsjö IF	22	12	3	7	42	42	0	39	
4	Kramfors-Alliansen	22	11	1	10	36	40	−4	34	
5	Fränsta IK	22	10	3	9	35	41	−6	33	
6	IFK Östersund	22	9	2	11	33	38	−5	29	
7	Matfors IF	22	9	1	12	48	42	+6	28	
8	IF Älgarna, Härnösand	22	7	6	9	28	31	−3	27	
9	Krokom/Dvärsätts IF	22	7	6	9	33	38	−5	27	Relegation Playoffs
10	Brunflo FK	22	7	3	12	27	46	−19	24	Relegated
11	Frösö IF	22	3	8	11	23	46	−23	17	Relegated
12	Alnö IF	22	2	5	15	23	52	−29	11	Relegated

=== Södra Norrland 1997 ===
Pos	Team	Pld	W	D	L	GF	GA	GD	Pts	Promotion or relegation
1	Söderhamns FF	22	15	6	1	60	21	+39	51	Promoted
2	Korsnäs IF FK	22	10	9	3	34	24	+10	39	Promotion Playoffs
3	Forssa BK	22	11	5	6	51	29	+22	38	
4	Säters IF FK	22	10	5	7	37	32	+5	35	
5	Bollnäs GIF FK	22	9	7	6	23	19	+4	34	
6	IFK Mora FK	22	7	8	7	33	35	−2	29	
7	Gestrike-Hammarby IF	22	8	4	10	27	32	−5	28	
8	Slätta SK, Falun	22	5	11	6	30	30	0	26	
9	Sala FF	22	6	7	9	26	25	+1	25	Relegation Playoffs – Relegated
10	Islingby IK	22	4	12	6	35	33	+2	24	Relegated
11	Strands IF, Hudiksvall	22	4	2	16	21	58	−37	14	Relegated
12	Äppelbo AIK	22	2	6	14	29	68	−39	12	Relegated

=== Norra Svealand 1997 ===
Pos	Team	Pld	W	D	L	GF	GA	GD	Pts	Promotion or relegation
1	Håbo FF	22	16	4	2	43	18	+25	52	Promoted
2	Spånga IS FK	22	16	2	4	46	12	+34	50	Promotion Playoffs – Promoted
3	FC Järfälla	22	13	4	5	56	32	+24	43	
4	Heby AIF	22	11	5	6	42	30	+12	38	
5	IF Vesta, Uppsala	22	12	2	8	38	28	+10	38	
6	Bälinge IF, Upplands-Bälinge	22	9	7	6	36	36	0	34	
7	Gideonsbergs IF, Västerås	22	8	6	8	30	35	−5	30	
8	BKV Norrtälje	22	8	3	11	31	31	0	27	
9	IK Franke, Västerås	22	5	6	11	20	31	−11	21	Relegation Playoffs – Relegated
10	Gamla Uppsala SK	22	6	3	13	21	40	−19	21	Relegated
11	IFK Viksjö	22	4	0	18	23	54	−31	12	Relegated
12	Fardhem/Garda IK (FG 86)	22	1	4	17	17	56	−39	7	Relegated

=== Östra Svealand 1997 ===
Pos	Team	Pld	W	D	L	GF	GA	GD	Pts	Promotion or relegation
1	Värtans IK, Stockholm	22	19	0	3	73	24	+49	57	Promoted
2	Syrianska F, Södertälje	22	17	2	3	58	16	+42	53	Promotion Playoffs
3	FoC Farsta	22	13	4	5	61	39	+22	43	
4	IFK Stockholm	22	9	4	9	39	35	+4	31	
5	Gnesta FF	22	7	7	8	35	42	−7	28	
6	Huddinge IF	22	8	4	10	40	52	−12	28	
7	Västerhaninge IF	22	7	4	11	34	44	−10	25	
8	Oxelösunds IK	22	7	4	11	36	55	−19	25	
9	Vagnhärads SK	22	6	6	10	39	36	+3	24	Relegation Playoffs – Relegated
10	Nykvarns SK	22	5	9	8	29	37	−8	24	Relegated
11	Råsunda IS, Solna	22	6	3	13	31	50	−19	21	Relegated
12	IFK Lidingö FK	22	1	7	14	20	65	−45	10	Relegated

=== Västra Svealand 1997 ===
Pos	Team	Pld	W	D	L	GF	GA	GD	Pts	Promotion or relegation
1	Rynninge IK, Örebro	22	14	1	7	45	20	+25	43	Promoted
2	Köpings FF	22	12	2	8	51	34	+17	38	Promotion Playoffs
3	Karlslunds IF HFK, Örebro	22	11	5	6	40	24	+16	38	
4	FBK Karlstad	22	9	7	6	35	34	+1	34	
5	BK Sport, Eskilstuna	22	9	5	8	51	35	+16	32	
6	Arboga Södra IF	22	8	6	8	32	30	+2	30	
7	IFK Ölme	22	8	5	9	41	45	−4	29	
8	KB Karlskoga FF	22	7	5	10	32	38	−6	26	
9	Vivalla/Lundby IF, Örebro	22	6	8	8	30	41	−11	26	Relegation Playoffs – Relegated
10	Adolfsbergs IK, Örebro	22	6	7	9	23	41	−18	25	Relegated
11	Skiljebo SK, Västerås	22	7	3	12	32	35	−3	24	Relegated
12	Garphyttans IF	22	5	6	11	25	60	−35	21	Relegated

=== Nordöstra Götaland 1997 ===
Pos	Team	Pld	W	D	L	GF	GA	GD	Pts	Promotion or relegation
1	Linköpings FF	22	15	4	3	58	30	+28	49	Promoted
2	Tenhults IF	22	14	3	5	48	25	+23	45	Promotion Playoffs
3	Tranås AIF FF	22	12	3	7	34	30	+4	39	
4	Hultsfreds FK	22	11	5	6	49	29	+20	38	
5	Nässjö FF	22	12	2	8	38	43	−5	38	
6	BK Zeros, Motala	22	10	4	8	36	29	+7	34	
7	Oskarshamns AIK	22	6	9	7	31	35	−4	27	
8	Aneby SK	22	7	5	10	37	31	+6	26	
9	Finspångs BK	22	7	4	11	25	40	−15	25	Relegation Playoffs
10	IK Ramunder, Söderköping	22	7	1	14	40	48	−8	22	Relegated
11	Mjölby AI FF	22	4	6	12	32	51	−19	18	Relegated
12	Lindö FF	22	2	4	16	30	67	−37	10	Relegated

=== Nordvästra Götaland 1997 ===
Pos	Team	Pld	W	D	L	GF	GA	GD	Pts	Promotion or relegation
1	Torslanda IK	22	12	5	5	42	24	+18	41	Promoted
2	Lysekils FF	22	12	5	5	38	28	+10	41	Promotion Playoffs
3	Skärhamns IK	22	12	4	6	52	34	+18	40	
4	IFK Trollhättan	22	11	7	4	42	28	+14	40	
5	Melleruds IF	22	10	4	8	37	41	−4	34	
6	Grebbestads IF/Tanums IF	22	10	3	9	31	23	+8	33	
7	Vänersborgs IF	22	7	9	6	47	44	+3	30	
8	Ytterby IS	22	8	6	8	37	42	−5	30	
9	Trollhättans BoIS	22	6	7	9	25	31	−6	25	Relegation Playoffs
10	Skogens IF, Göteborg	22	6	4	12	27	39	−12	22	Relegated
11	BK Slätta Damm, Göteborg	22	4	3	15	28	53	−25	15	Relegated
12	Inlands IF, Lilla Edet	22	2	7	13	28	47	−19	13	Relegated

=== Mellersta Götaland 1997 ===
Pos	Team	Pld	W	D	L	GF	GA	GD	Pts	Promotion or relegation
1	IFK Fjärås	22	12	4	6	48	34	+14	40	Promoted
2	Ulvåkers IF	22	11	6	5	34	22	+12	39	Promotion Playoffs
3	Vara SK	22	11	5	6	52	41	+11	38	
4	Ulricehamns IFK	22	10	5	7	42	44	−2	35	
5	Askims IK	22	10	4	8	43	38	+5	34	
6	Götene IF	22	7	9	6	38	34	+4	30	
7	IFK Tidaholm	22	9	3	10	31	39	−8	30	
8	IFK Hällingsjö	22	8	5	9	37	45	−8	29	
9	Kungsbacka BI	22	5	12	5	35	31	+4	27	Relegation Playoffs – Relegated
10	IFK Skövde FK	22	6	7	9	36	39	−3	25	Relegated
11	Töreboda IK	22	5	4	13	34	57	−23	19	Relegated
12	Kållereds SK	22	4	4	14	41	47	−6	16	Relegated

=== Sydöstra Götaland 1997 ===
Pos	Team	Pld	W	D	L	GF	GA	GD	Pts	Promotion or relegation
1	Åhus Horna IF	22	17	1	4	49	21	+28	52	Promoted
2	Olofströms IF	22	14	5	3	54	25	+29	47	Promotion Playoffs – Promoted
3	IFK Karlshamn	22	11	7	4	38	21	+17	40	
4	Hanaskogs IS	22	11	4	7	35	32	+3	37	
5	Karlskrona AIF	22	10	5	7	36	30	+6	35	
6	Ifö/Bromölla IF	22	7	12	3	40	21	+19	33	
7	Färjestadens GIF	22	7	10	5	25	29	−4	31	
8	Mönsterås GIF	22	7	5	10	30	33	−3	26	
9	Sösdala IF	22	6	3	13	43	56	−13	21	Relegation Playoffs – Relegated
10	IFK Borgholm	22	4	3	15	24	43	−19	15	Relegated
11	Smedby BoIK, Kalmar	22	3	6	13	22	49	−27	15	Relegated
12	IFK Osby	22	2	5	15	14	51	−37	11	Relegated

=== Sydvästra Götaland 1997 ===
Pos	Team	Pld	W	D	L	GF	GA	GD	Pts	Promotion or relegation
1	Skene IF	22	14	5	3	41	21	+20	47	Promoted
2	Ljungby IF	22	13	5	4	41	24	+17	44	Promotion Playoffs
3	Kinna IF	22	11	4	7	41	38	+3	37	
4	Växjö BK	22	10	6	6	36	27	+9	36	
5	Strömsnäsbruks IF	22	10	4	8	34	36	−2	34	
6	Alvesta GIF	22	9	5	8	46	31	+15	32	
7	Gislaveds IS	22	8	5	9	34	38	−4	29	
8	Markaryds IF	22	8	4	10	39	37	+2	28	
9	Varbergs GIF FF	22	8	4	10	34	35	−1	28	Relegation Playoffs – Relegated
10	Värnamo Södra FF	22	6	5	11	29	45	−16	23	Relegated
11	Mariedals IK, Borås	22	5	5	12	25	44	−19	20	Relegated
12	Anderstorps IF	22	3	2	17	22	46	−24	11	Relegated

=== Södra Götaland 1997 ===
Pos	Team	Pld	W	D	L	GF	GA	GD	Pts	Promotion or relegation
1	Ystads IF FF	22	14	4	4	56	25	+31	46	Promoted
2	Kirsebergs IF, Malmö	22	11	6	5	45	24	+21	39	Promotion Playoffs
3	Klippans BIF	22	11	3	8	44	41	+3	36	
4	Helsingborgs Södra BIS	22	9	8	5	33	31	+2	35	
5	Höllvikens GIF, Höllviksnäs	22	9	6	7	37	22	+15	33	
6	Kulladals FF, Malmö	22	9	6	7	40	37	+3	33	
7	Husie IF	22	8	5	9	35	42	−7	29	
8	GIF Nike, Malmö	22	8	4	10	35	37	−2	28	
9	Ramlösa BoIS	22	8	2	12	31	38	−7	26	Relegation Playoffs – Relegated
10	BK Landora, Landskrona	22	5	6	11	24	45	−21	21	Relegated
11	IFK Simrishamn	22	4	8	10	29	40	−11	20	Relegated
12	Arlövs BI	22	5	4	13	24	51	−27	19	Relegated
