= 1996 Division 3 (Swedish football) =

Swedish League Division 3
- Season: 1996
- Champions: Umedalens IF; Delsbo IF; IFK Gävle; FC Cafè Opera/Djursholm; Hargs BK; IFK Kumla FK; Hjulsbro IK; Trollhättans FK; IFK Värnamo; Nybro IF; Vinbergs IF; BK Olympic
- Promoted: 12 teams above and: Morön BK; Enebybergs IF; Laholms FK
- Relegated: 46 teams

Statistics of Swedish football Division 3 for the 1996 season.

== League standings ==
=== Norra Norrland 1996 ===
Pos	Team	Pld	W	D	L	GF	GA	GD	Pts	Promotion or relegation
1	Umedalens IF, Umeå	22	16	4	2	40	12	+28	52	Promoted
2	Morön BK	22	15	4	3	48	14	+34	49	Promotion Playoffs – Promoted
3	Täfteå IK	22	11	7	4	45	21	+24	40	
4	Malmbergets AIF	22	11	6	5	36	24	+12	39	
5	Hedens IF, Boden	22	11	2	9	37	41	−4	35	
6	Blattnicksele IF	22	8	3	11	39	42	−3	27	
7	IFK Kalix	22	8	2	12	28	35	−7	26	
8	Luleå SK	22	6	7	9	23	25	−2	25	
9	IFK Umeå	22	7	3	12	28	36	−8	24	Relegation Playoffs – Relegated
10	Gammelstads IF, Luleå	22	5	7	10	28	47	−19	22	Relegated
11	Rönnskärs IF, Skelleftehamn	22	5	3	14	25	55	−30	18	Relegated
12	Bergnäsets AIK, Luleå	22	2	6	14	15	40	−25	12	Relegated

=== Mellersta Norrland 1996 ===
Pos	Team	Pld	W	D	L	GF	GA	GD	Pts	Promotion or relegation
1	Delsbo IF	22	12	5	5	61	38	+23	41	Promoted
2	Brunflo FK	22	12	4	6	43	33	+10	40	Promotion Playoffs
3	Matfors IF	22	12	3	7	45	29	+16	39	
4	Krokom/Dvärsätts IF	22	10	8	4	44	33	+11	38	
5	Kramfors-Alliansen	22	9	6	7	36	30	+6	33	
6	Selånger FK, Sundsvall	22	8	7	7	46	33	+13	31	
7	Frösö IF	22	8	3	11	40	51	−11	27	
8	Anundsjö IF	22	8	3	11	35	51	−16	27	
9	Östersund/Torvalla FF	22	6	6	10	21	40	−19	24	Relegation Playoffs – Relegated
10	Sollefteå GIF	22	6	4	12	29	46	−17	22	Relegated
11	Stockviks FF	22	5	6	11	31	34	−3	21	Relegated
12	Domsjö IF	22	4	9	9	30	43	−13	21	Relegated

=== Södra Norrland 1996 ===
Pos	Team	Pld	W	D	L	GF	GA	GD	Pts	Promotion or relegation
1	IFK Gävle	22	15	2	5	51	30	+21	47	Promoted
2	Söderhamns FF	22	13	5	4	54	31	+23	44	Promotion Playoffs
3	Korsnäs IF FK	22	12	6	4	47	22	+25	42	
4	Forssa BK	22	11	7	4	39	21	+18	40	
5	Slätta SK	22	12	3	7	43	32	+11	39	
6	Strands IF, Hudiksvall	22	10	5	7	47	43	+4	35	
7	IFK Mora FK	22	10	5	7	33	30	+3	35	
8	Säters IF FK	22	9	3	10	27	29	−2	30	
9	IFK Grängesberg	22	7	4	11	46	46	0	25	Relegation Playoffs – Relegated
10	Kvarnsvedens IK	22	4	2	16	12	58	−46	14	Relegated
11	Torsåkers IF	22	4	1	17	31	53	−22	13	Relegated
12	Avesta AIK	22	1	5	16	15	50	−35	8	Relegated

=== Norra Svealand 1996 ===
Pos	Team	Pld	W	D	L	GF	GA	GD	Pts	Promotion or relegation
1	FC Cafè Opera/Djursholm	22	16	3	3	53	18	+35	51	Promoted
2	Enebybergs IF	22	16	3	3	58	24	+34	51	Promotion Playoffs – Promoted
3	Spånga IS FK	22	14	4	4	64	19	+45	46	
4	IF Vesta, Uppsala	22	10	8	4	36	21	+15	38	
5	Heby AIF	22	11	3	8	42	26	+16	36	
6	Sala FF	22	10	1	11	35	39	−4	31	
7	Bälinge IF, Upplands-Bälinge	22	8	3	11	33	37	−4	27	
8	Övergrans IF	22	6	4	12	28	54	−26	22	
9	Sunnersta AIF	22	4	9	9	30	49	−19	21	Relegation Playoffs – Relegated
10	Helenelunds IK	22	4	7	11	24	44	−20	19	Relegated
11	IK Bele, Järfälla	22	4	3	15	34	60	−26	15	Relegated
12	Täby IS	22	3	4	15	27	73	−46	13	Relegated

=== Östra Svealand 1996 ===
Pos	Team	Pld	W	D	L	GF	GA	GD	Pts	Promotion or relegation
1	Hargs BK	22	13	5	4	38	20	+18	44	Promoted
2	Skiljebo SK, Västerås	22	13	3	6	51	27	+24	42	Promotion Playoffs
3	Råsunda IS, Solna	22	11	6	5	41	26	+15	39	
4	IFK Lidingö FK	22	11	3	8	36	27	+9	36	
5	Syrianska F, Södertälje	22	9	9	4	30	22	+8	36	
6	Gnesta FF	22	8	5	9	30	35	−5	29	
7	Nykvarns SK	22	6	10	6	35	34	+1	28	
8	IFK Stockholm	22	7	6	9	23	27	−4	27	
9	Vagnhärads SK	22	6	6	10	29	36	−7	24	Relegation Playoffs
10	IFK Tumba FK	22	6	5	11	38	45	−7	23	Relegated
11	Saltsjöbadens IF	22	4	6	12	27	51	−24	18	Relegated
12	Arameiska/Syrianska KIF, Norsborg	22	3	6	13	16	44	−28	15	Relegated

=== Västra Svealand 1996 ===
Pos	Team	Pld	W	D	L	GF	GA	GD	Pts	Promotion or relegation
1	IFK Kumla FK	22	12	4	6	38	23	+15	40	Promoted
2	FBK Karlstad	22	10	9	3	46	25	+21	39	Promotion Playoffs
3	BK Sport, Eskilstuna	22	10	8	4	48	27	+21	38	
4	Arboga Södra IF	22	11	5	6	34	31	+3	38	
5	Adolfsbergs IK, Örebro	22	10	6	6	32	20	+12	36	
6	Vivalla/Lundby IF, Örebro	22	9	5	8	34	33	+1	32	
7	KB Karlskoga	22	10	2	10	37	45	−8	32	
8	Gideonsbergs IF, Västerås	22	8	7	7	32	27	+5	31	
9	Filipstads FF	22	8	2	12	36	44	−8	26	Relegation Playoffs – Relegated
10	Västerås IK	22	6	5	11	24	39	−15	23	Relegated
11	Säffle FF	22	3	9	10	18	36	−18	18	Relegated
12	IFK Kristinehamn	22	1	6	15	20	49	−29	9	Relegated

=== Nordöstra Götaland 1996 ===
Pos	Team	Pld	W	D	L	GF	GA	GD	Pts	Promotion or relegation
1	Hjulsbro IK, Linköping	22	15	6	1	42	15	+27	51	Promoted
2	Hultsfreds FK	22	14	3	5	48	24	+24	45	Promotion Playoffs
3	Mönsterås GoIF	22	11	7	4	41	20	+21	40	
4	Mjölby AI FF	22	11	2	9	37	32	+5	35	
5	IK Ramunder, Söderköping	22	9	3	10	27	36	−9	30	
6	Smedby BoIK, Kalmar	22	9	2	11	34	37	−3	29	
7	IFK Borgholm	22	7	6	9	27	39	−12	27	
8	Tranås AIF FF	22	6	7	9	35	36	−1	25	
9	Västerviks FF	22	6	6	10	22	28	−6	24	Relegation Playoffs – Relegated
10	Smedby AIS, Norrköping	22	5	8	9	24	30	−6	23	Relegated
11	Hagahöjdens BK, Norrköping	22	6	3	13	33	48	−15	21	Relegated
12	Hemgårdarnas BK, Norrköping	22	4	5	13	21	46	−25	17	Relegated

=== Nordvästra Götaland 1996 ===
Pos	Team	Pld	W	D	L	GF	GA	GD	Pts	Promotion or relegation
1	Trollhättans FK	22	15	4	3	58	28	+30	49	Promoted
2	IFK Trollhättan	22	14	5	3	53	22	+31	47	Promotion Playoffs
3	Ytterby IS	22	14	3	5	43	14	+29	45	
4	Skärhamns IK	22	13	4	5	51	35	+16	43	
5	Inlands IF, Lilla Edet	22	13	1	8	43	39	+4	40	
6	Melleruds IF	22	9	7	6	44	33	+11	34	
7	Trollhättans BoIS	22	8	4	10	36	36	0	28	
8	Lysekils FF	22	7	3	12	38	54	−16	24	
9	Skepplanda BTK	22	6	3	13	35	62	−27	21	Relegation Playoffs – Relegated
10	Kungshamns IF	22	3	7	12	26	47	−21	16	Relegated
11	IF Viken, Åmål	22	3	4	15	22	53	−31	13	Relegated
12	Alingsås IF	22	3	3	16	31	57	−26	12	Relegated

=== Mellersta Götaland 1996 ===
Pos	Team	Pld	W	D	L	GF	GA	GD	Pts	Promotion or relegation
1	IFK Värnamo	22	14	6	2	40	17	+23	48	Promoted
2	IFK Skövde FK	22	10	8	4	39	28	+11	38	Promotion Playoffs
3	Gislaveds IS	22	11	5	6	36	25	+11	38	
4	Nässjö FF	22	8	8	6	26	24	+2	32	
5	Anderstorps IF	22	9	3	10	22	28	−6	30	
6	Vara SK	22	9	2	11	46	39	+7	29	
7	Töreboda IK	22	7	7	8	31	35	−4	28	
8	Götene IF	22	7	7	8	23	32	−9	28	
9	Värnamo Södra FF	22	7	6	9	24	31	−7	27	Relegation Playoffs
10	IFK Falköping	22	6	8	8	30	32	−2	26	Relegated
11	Bors SK	22	6	7	9	31	31	0	25	Relegated
12	Bankeryds SK	22	3	3	16	27	53	−26	12	Relegated

=== Sydöstra Götaland 1996 ===
Pos	Team	Pld	W	D	L	GF	GA	GD	Pts	Promotion or relegation
1	Nybro IF	22	14	5	3	55	24	+31	47	Promoted
2	Åhus Horna BK	22	14	4	4	49	26	+23	46	Promotion Playoffs
3	Växjö BK	22	10	5	7	44	30	+14	35	
4	Sösdala IF	22	8	11	3	36	26	+10	35	
5	Markaryds IF	22	9	7	6	36	27	+9	34	
6	IFÖ/Bromölla IF	22	8	6	8	26	26	0	30	
7	IFK Osby	22	8	4	10	25	29	−4	28	
8	Strömsnäsbruks IF	22	8	4	10	25	30	−5	28	
9	Jämshögs IF	22	6	8	8	29	32	−3	26	Relegation Playoffs – Relegated
10	Sölvesborgs GIF	22	6	7	9	28	41	−13	25	Relegated
11	Ryssby IF	22	5	3	14	21	53	−32	18	Relegated
12	Emmaboda IS	22	1	6	15	15	45	−30	9	Relegated

=== Sydvästra Götaland 1996 ===
Pos	Team	Pld	W	D	L	GF	GA	GD	Pts	Promotion or relegation
1	Vinbergs IF	22	15	4	3	50	23	+27	49	Promoted
2	Laholms FK	22	15	2	5	54	26	+28	47	Promotion Playoffs – Promoted
3	Skene IF	22	14	4	4	54	23	+31	46	
4	Kinna IF	22	13	0	9	47	23	+24	39	
5	Askims IK	22	10	3	9	45	36	+9	33	
6	Varbergs GIF FF	22	10	2	10	43	35	+8	32	
7	Skogens IF, Göteborg	22	9	3	10	30	35	−5	30	
8	BK Slätta Damm, Göteborg	22	9	3	10	27	46	−19	30	
9	Varbergs BoIS FC	22	9	2	11	31	45	−14	29	Relegation Playoffs – Relegated
10	Fässbergs IF, Mölndal	22	5	5	12	20	36	−16	20	Relegated
11	IF Norvalla, Väröbacka	22	4	2	16	26	58	−32	14	Relegated
12	Mölnlycke IF	22	2	4	16	26	67	−41	10	Relegated

=== Södra Götaland 1996 ===
Pos	Team	Pld	W	D	L	GF	GA	GD	Pts	Promotion or relegation
1	BK Olympic, Malmö	22	16	1	5	47	28	+19	49	Promoted
2	Ystads IF FF	22	13	3	6	44	24	+20	42	Promotion Playoffs
3	BK Landora, Landskrona	22	10	5	7	47	31	+16	35	
4	Arlövs BI	22	10	3	9	44	34	+10	33	
5	Ramlösa BoIS	22	9	6	7	48	41	+7	33	
6	Husie IF	22	9	5	8	36	37	−1	32	
7	Kulladals FF, Malmö	22	10	2	10	33	34	−1	32	
8	Höllvikens GIF, Höllviksnäs	22	9	3	10	31	27	+4	30	
9	Limhamns IF	22	9	2	11	46	42	+4	29	Relegation Playoffs – Relegated
10	Tomelilla IF	22	8	4	10	36	39	−3	28	Relegated
11	Staffanstorps GIF	22	7	5	10	35	51	−16	26	Relegated
12	Svedala IF	22	2	1	19	19	78	−59	7	Relegated
