= 1998 Division 3 (Swedish football) =

Swedish League Division 3
- Season: 1998
- Champions: Bodens BK; Friska Viljor FC; Edsbyns IF; FC Järfälla; Älta IF; FBK Karlstad; IK Sleipner; Skärhamns IK; Ulvåkers IF; IFÖ/Bromölla IF; IF Leikin; Höllvikens GIF
- Promoted: 12 teams above and: Stockviks FF; KB Karlskoga; Ljungby IF
- Relegated: 43 teams

Statistics of Swedish football Division 3 for the 1998 season.

== League standings ==
=== Norra Norrland 1998 ===
| Pos | Team | Pld | W | D | L | GF | GA | GD | Pts | Promotion or relegation |
|---|---|---|---|---|---|---|---|---|---|---|
| 1 | Bodens BK | 22 | 17 | 2 | 3 | 51 | 19 | +32 | 53 | Promoted |
| 2 | IFK Kalix | 22 | 15 | 4 | 3 | 58 | 23 | +35 | 49 | Promotion Playoffs |
| 3 | Robertsfors IK | 22 | 12 | 5 | 5 | 42 | 30 | +12 | 41 | |
| 4 | Luleå SK | 22 | 11 | 5 | 6 | 40 | 27 | +13 | 38 | |
| 5 | Storfors AIK | 22 | 9 | 6 | 7 | 41 | 34 | +7 | 33 | |
| 6 | Malmbergets AIF | 22 | 8 | 3 | 11 | 36 | 41 | −5 | 27 | |
| 7 | Hedens IF, Boden | 22 | 8 | 3 | 11 | 36 | 43 | −7 | 27 | |
| 8 | Betsele IF | 22 | 7 | 4 | 11 | 25 | 37 | −12 | 25 | |
| 9 | Älvsby IF | 22 | 6 | 6 | 10 | 36 | 38 | −2 | 24 | Relegation Playoffs – Relegated |
| 10 | Sorsele IF | 22 | 4 | 10 | 8 | 22 | 31 | −9 | 22 | Relegated |
| 11 | Notvikens IK, Luleå | 22 | 4 | 6 | 12 | 25 | 53 | −28 | 18 | Relegated |
| 12 | Rutviks SK | 22 | 2 | 4 | 16 | 14 | 50 | −36 | 10 | Relegated |

=== Mellersta Norrland 1998 ===
| Pos | Team | Pld | W | D | L | GF | GA | GD | Pts | Promotion or relegation |
|---|---|---|---|---|---|---|---|---|---|---|
| 1 | Friska Viljor FC, Örnsköldsvik | 22 | 13 | 5 | 4 | 51 | 28 | +23 | 44 | Promoted |
| 2 | Stockviks FF | 22 | 14 | 0 | 8 | 50 | 32 | +18 | 42 | Promotion Playoffs – Promoted |
| 3 | Umedalens IF, Umeå | 22 | 12 | 5 | 5 | 47 | 21 | +26 | 41 | |
| 4 | IFK Sundsvall | 22 | 11 | 3 | 8 | 44 | 33 | +11 | 36 | |
| 5 | Krokom/Dvärsätts IF | 22 | 11 | 1 | 10 | 43 | 37 | +6 | 34 | |
| 6 | Matfors IF | 22 | 10 | 3 | 9 | 41 | 33 | +8 | 33 | |
| 7 | IF Älgarna, Härnösand | 22 | 8 | 7 | 7 | 37 | 38 | −1 | 31 | |
| 8 | Vännäs AIK | 22 | 9 | 4 | 9 | 30 | 31 | −1 | 31 | |
| 9 | Anundsjö IF | 22 | 9 | 1 | 12 | 32 | 35 | −3 | 28 | Relegation Playoffs |
| 10 | IFK Östersund | 22 | 6 | 3 | 13 | 32 | 48 | −16 | 21 | Relegated |
| 11 | Kramfors-Alliansen | 22 | 5 | 4 | 13 | 21 | 58 | −37 | 19 | Relegated |
| 12 | Fränsta IK | 22 | 5 | 2 | 15 | 27 | 61 | −34 | 17 | Relegated |

=== Södra Norrland 1998 ===
| Pos | Team | Pld | W | D | L | GF | GA | GD | Pts | Promotion or relegation |
|---|---|---|---|---|---|---|---|---|---|---|
| 1 | Edsbyns IF | 22 | 15 | 3 | 4 | 54 | 28 | +26 | 48 | Promoted |
| 2 | Falu BS FK, Falun | 22 | 14 | 5 | 3 | 46 | 17 | +29 | 47 | Promotion Playoffs |
| 3 | Ytterhogdals IK | 22 | 13 | 2 | 7 | 48 | 35 | +13 | 41 | |
| 4 | Bollnäs GIF FF | 22 | 11 | 5 | 6 | 37 | 29 | +8 | 38 | |
| 5 | Gestrike/Hammarby IF | 22 | 11 | 3 | 8 | 41 | 32 | +9 | 36 | |
| 6 | Slätta SK, Falun | 22 | 9 | 6 | 7 | 28 | 31 | −3 | 33 | |
| 7 | Säters IF FK | 22 | 6 | 8 | 8 | 27 | 33 | −6 | 26 | |
| 8 | Korsnäs IF FK | 22 | 5 | 7 | 10 | 24 | 39 | −15 | 22 | |
| 9 | Forssa BK, Borlänge | 22 | 5 | 6 | 11 | 28 | 37 | −9 | 21 | Relegation Playoffs |
| 10 | IFK Mora FK | 22 | 4 | 8 | 10 | 26 | 32 | −6 | 20 | Relegated |
| 11 | Delsbo IF | 22 | 4 | 5 | 13 | 23 | 40 | −17 | 17 | Relegated |
| 12 | Forsbacka IK | 22 | 5 | 2 | 15 | 24 | 53 | −29 | 17 | Relegated |

=== Norra Svealand 1998 ===
| Pos | Team | Pld | W | D | L | GF | GA | GD | Pts | Promotion or relegation |
|---|---|---|---|---|---|---|---|---|---|---|
| 1 | FC Järfälla | 22 | 15 | 4 | 3 | 47 | 29 | +18 | 49 | Promoted |
| 2 | Västerås IK | 22 | 10 | 6 | 6 | 36 | 24 | +12 | 36 | Promotion Playoffs |
| 3 | Gimo IF FK | 20 | 11 | 3 | 6 | 43 | 47 | −4 | 36 | |
| 4 | Bälinge IF, Upplands-Bälinge | 22 | 10 | 4 | 8 | 39 | 30 | +9 | 34 | |
| 5 | BKV Norrtälje | 22 | 9 | 5 | 8 | 32 | 39 | −7 | 32 | |
| 6 | IF Vindhemspojkarna, Uppsala | 22 | 8 | 7 | 7 | 40 | 29 | +11 | 31 | |
| 7 | Heby AIF | 22 | 9 | 4 | 9 | 30 | 36 | −6 | 31 | |
| 8 | IFK Österåker FK, Åkersberga | 22 | 7 | 6 | 9 | 33 | 37 | −4 | 27 | |
| 9 | Valsta Syrianska IK, Märsta | 22 | 8 | 3 | 11 | 41 | 46 | −5 | 27 | Relegation Playoffs |
| 10 | Fårösunds GoIK | 22 | 6 | 5 | 11 | 39 | 49 | −10 | 23 | Relegated |
| 11 | IF Vesta, Uppsala | 22 | 5 | 7 | 10 | 37 | 39 | −2 | 22 | Relegated |
| 12 | Gideonsbergs IF, Västerås | 22 | 5 | 4 | 13 | 30 | 42 | −12 | 19 | Relegated |

=== Östra Svealand 1998 ===
| Pos | Team | Pld | W | D | L | GF | GA | GD | Pts | Promotion or relegation |
|---|---|---|---|---|---|---|---|---|---|---|
| 1 | Älta IF | 22 | 18 | 2 | 2 | 71 | 27 | +44 | 56 | Promoted |
| 2 | Topkapi IK, Spånga | 22 | 15 | 4 | 3 | 52 | 26 | +26 | 49 | Promotion Playoffs |
| 3 | Syrianska Föreningen, Södertälje | 22 | 12 | 4 | 6 | 65 | 42 | +23 | 40 | |
| 4 | FoC Farsta | 22 | 13 | 1 | 8 | 45 | 35 | +10 | 40 | |
| 5 | Hargs BK | 22 | 10 | 2 | 10 | 50 | 44 | +6 | 32 | |
| 6 | Gustavsbergs IF | 22 | 10 | 2 | 10 | 49 | 48 | +1 | 32 | |
| 7 | IFK Stockholm | 22 | 9 | 3 | 10 | 40 | 38 | +2 | 30 | |
| 8 | Oxelösunds IK | 22 | 8 | 3 | 11 | 38 | 44 | −6 | 27 | |
| 9 | Huddinge IF | 22 | 7 | 5 | 10 | 29 | 33 | −4 | 26 | Relegation Playoffs – Relegated |
| 10 | Hägerstens SK | 22 | 6 | 3 | 13 | 39 | 53 | −14 | 21 | Relegated |
| 11 | Västerhaninge IF | 22 | 5 | 2 | 15 | 29 | 59 | −30 | 17 | Relegated |
| 12 | Gnesta FF | 22 | 2 | 3 | 17 | 13 | 71 | −58 | 9 | Relegated |

=== Västra Svealand 1998 ===
| Pos | Team | Pld | W | D | L | GF | GA | GD | Pts | Promotion or relegation |
|---|---|---|---|---|---|---|---|---|---|---|
| 1 | FBK Karlstad | 22 | 15 | 4 | 3 | 59 | 27 | +32 | 49 | Promoted |
| 2 | KB Karlskoga FF | 22 | 13 | 6 | 3 | 67 | 29 | +38 | 45 | Promotion Playoffs – Promoted |
| 3 | Karlslunds IF HFK, Örebro | 22 | 12 | 6 | 4 | 50 | 25 | +25 | 42 | |
| 4 | Arboga Södra IF | 22 | 12 | 6 | 4 | 61 | 39 | +22 | 42 | |
| 5 | Köping FF | 22 | 13 | 2 | 7 | 68 | 44 | +24 | 41 | |
| 6 | IFK Ölme | 22 | 11 | 7 | 4 | 59 | 39 | +20 | 40 | |
| 7 | IK Sturehov, Örebro | 22 | 8 | 3 | 11 | 45 | 57 | −12 | 27 | |
| 8 | Lillåns IF | 22 | 7 | 3 | 12 | 58 | 64 | −6 | 24 | |
| 9 | IFK Kumla FK | 22 | 7 | 2 | 13 | 34 | 52 | −18 | 23 | Relegation Playoffs – Relegated |
| 10 | BK Sport, Eskilstuna | 22 | 5 | 5 | 12 | 32 | 56 | −24 | 20 | Relegated |
| 11 | SK Sifhälla, Säffle | 22 | 3 | 2 | 17 | 32 | 74 | −42 | 11 | Relegated |
| 12 | Härads IF | 22 | 1 | 4 | 17 | 33 | 92 | −59 | 7 | Relegated |

=== Nordöstra Götaland 1998 ===
| Pos | Team | Pld | W | D | L | GF | GA | GD | Pts | Promotion or relegation |
|---|---|---|---|---|---|---|---|---|---|---|
| 1 | IK Sleipner, Norrköping | 22 | 16 | 4 | 2 | 54 | 16 | +38 | 52 | Promoted |
| 2 | Nässjö FF | 22 | 13 | 7 | 2 | 49 | 19 | +30 | 46 | Promotion Playoffs |
| 3 | BK Zeros, Motala | 22 | 12 | 3 | 7 | 36 | 35 | +1 | 39 | |
| 4 | Aneby SK | 22 | 10 | 8 | 4 | 48 | 36 | +12 | 38 | |
| 5 | Tranås AIF FF | 22 | 11 | 4 | 7 | 43 | 36 | +7 | 37 | |
| 6 | Lemunda/Starka Wiljor IF, Motala | 22 | 10 | 6 | 6 | 40 | 22 | +18 | 36 | |
| 7 | Oskarshamns AIK | 22 | 7 | 4 | 11 | 32 | 35 | −3 | 25 | |
| 8 | Hvetlanda GIF, Vetlanda | 22 | 7 | 4 | 11 | 40 | 47 | −7 | 25 | |
| 9 | Hultsfreds FK | 22 | 5 | 5 | 12 | 29 | 45 | −16 | 20 | Relegation Playoffs – Relegated |
| 10 | Finspångs BK | 22 | 5 | 4 | 13 | 27 | 42 | −15 | 19 | Relegated |
| 11 | Finspångs AIK | 22 | 3 | 7 | 12 | 21 | 50 | −29 | 16 | Relegated |
| 12 | Mönsterås GIF | 22 | 3 | 4 | 15 | 34 | 70 | −36 | 13 | Relegated |

=== Nordvästra Götaland 1998 ===
| Pos | Team | Pld | W | D | L | GF | GA | GD | Pts | Promotion or relegation |
|---|---|---|---|---|---|---|---|---|---|---|
| 1 | Skärhamns IK | 22 | 13 | 5 | 4 | 49 | 21 | +28 | 44 | Promoted |
| 2 | Ytterby IS | 22 | 14 | 2 | 6 | 50 | 27 | +23 | 44 | Promotion Playoffs |
| 3 | Vänersborgs IF | 22 | 12 | 6 | 4 | 31 | 22 | +9 | 42 | |
| 4 | Trollhättans BoIS | 22 | 10 | 4 | 8 | 41 | 35 | +6 | 34 | |
| 5 | Lundens AIS, Göteborg | 22 | 8 | 6 | 8 | 37 | 41 | −4 | 30 | |
| 6 | Lysekils FF | 22 | 8 | 5 | 9 | 30 | 39 | −9 | 29 | |
| 7 | Grebbestads IF/Tanums IF | 22 | 7 | 6 | 9 | 34 | 34 | 0 | 27 | |
| 8 | IFK Trollhättan | 22 | 7 | 5 | 10 | 31 | 34 | −3 | 26 | |
| 9 | Kungshamns IF | 22 | 7 | 5 | 10 | 40 | 46 | −6 | 26 | Relegation Playoffs |
| 10 | Melleruds IF | 22 | 6 | 6 | 10 | 32 | 39 | −7 | 24 | Relegated |
| 11 | IFK Uddevalla | 22 | 6 | 4 | 12 | 34 | 51 | −17 | 22 | Relegated |
| 12 | IK Zenith, Torslanda | 22 | 6 | 2 | 14 | 30 | 50 | −20 | 20 | Relegated |

=== Mellersta Götaland 1998 ===
| Pos | Team | Pld | W | D | L | GF | GA | GD | Pts | Promotion or relegation |
|---|---|---|---|---|---|---|---|---|---|---|
| 1 | Ulvåkers IF | 22 | 16 | 2 | 4 | 62 | 27 | +35 | 50 | Promoted |
| 2 | Tidaholms GoIF | 22 | 11 | 5 | 6 | 48 | 28 | +20 | 38 | Promotion Playoffs |
| 3 | IFK Hällingsjö | 22 | 11 | 4 | 7 | 42 | 36 | +6 | 37 | |
| 4 | IFK Falköping | 22 | 9 | 5 | 8 | 42 | 41 | +1 | 32 | |
| 5 | Gerdskens BK, Alingsås | 22 | 10 | 2 | 10 | 41 | 40 | +1 | 32 | |
| 6 | Ulricehamns IFK | 22 | 9 | 3 | 10 | 39 | 41 | −2 | 30 | |
| 7 | Mossens BK, Göteborg | 22 | 9 | 2 | 11 | 38 | 56 | −18 | 29 | |
| 8 | Vara SK | 22 | 7 | 7 | 8 | 40 | 46 | −6 | 28 | |
| 9 | Skara FC | 22 | 6 | 7 | 9 | 35 | 39 | −4 | 25 | Relegation Playoffs |
| 10 | Askims IK | 22 | 7 | 3 | 12 | 56 | 54 | +2 | 24 | Relegated |
| 11 | Götene IF | 22 | 6 | 6 | 10 | 35 | 45 | −10 | 24 | Relegated |
| 12 | IFK Tidaholm | 22 | 5 | 6 | 11 | 32 | 58 | −26 | 21 | Relegated |

=== Sydöstra Götaland 1998 ===
| Pos | Team | Pld | W | D | L | GF | GA | GD | Pts | Promotion or relegation |
|---|---|---|---|---|---|---|---|---|---|---|
| 1 | IFÖ/Bromölla IF | 22 | 14 | 4 | 4 | 64 | 29 | +35 | 46 | Promoted |
| 2 | Växjö BK | 22 | 13 | 5 | 4 | 59 | 37 | +22 | 44 | Promotion Playoffs |
| 3 | Tomelilla IF | 22 | 13 | 2 | 7 | 54 | 44 | +10 | 41 | |
| 4 | IFK Karlshamn | 22 | 12 | 4 | 6 | 60 | 43 | +17 | 40 | |
| 5 | Karlskrona AIF | 22 | 11 | 6 | 5 | 41 | 27 | +14 | 39 | |
| 6 | Älmhults IF | 22 | 8 | 9 | 5 | 42 | 33 | +9 | 33 | |
| 7 | Färjestadens GoIF | 22 | 8 | 4 | 10 | 33 | 41 | −8 | 28 | |
| 8 | Saxemara IF | 22 | 6 | 6 | 10 | 22 | 26 | −4 | 24 | |
| 9 | AIK Atlas, Sturkö | 22 | 6 | 4 | 12 | 42 | 63 | −21 | 22 | Relegation Playoffs – Relegated |
| 10 | Emmaboda IS | 22 | 4 | 6 | 12 | 22 | 51 | −29 | 18 | Relegated |
| 11 | Hanaskogs IS | 22 | 5 | 2 | 15 | 43 | 57 | −14 | 17 | Relegated |
| 12 | Listerby IK | 22 | 5 | 2 | 15 | 30 | 61 | −31 | 17 | Relegated |

=== Sydvästra Götaland 1998 ===
| Pos | Team | Pld | W | D | L | GF | GA | GD | Pts | Promotion or relegation |
|---|---|---|---|---|---|---|---|---|---|---|
| 1 | IF Leikin, Halmstad | 22 | 15 | 3 | 4 | 69 | 24 | +45 | 48 | Promoted |
| 2 | Ljungby IF | 22 | 14 | 5 | 3 | 57 | 21 | +36 | 47 | Promotion Playoffs – Promoted |
| 3 | Tenhults IF | 22 | 11 | 6 | 5 | 44 | 31 | +13 | 39 | |
| 4 | IF Hagapojkarna, Jönköping | 22 | 11 | 3 | 8 | 43 | 44 | −1 | 36 | |
| 5 | Strömsnäsbruks IF | 22 | 8 | 8 | 6 | 37 | 26 | +11 | 32 | |
| 6 | Kinna IF | 22 | 7 | 7 | 8 | 27 | 39 | −12 | 28 | |
| 7 | Varbergs BoIS FC | 22 | 6 | 9 | 7 | 35 | 40 | −5 | 27 | |
| 8 | Gislaveds IS | 22 | 7 | 6 | 9 | 34 | 39 | −5 | 27 | |
| 9 | Alvesta GIF | 22 | 5 | 11 | 6 | 37 | 33 | +4 | 26 | Relegation Playoffs – Relegated |
| 10 | IFK Örby, Kinna | 22 | 7 | 3 | 12 | 34 | 43 | −9 | 24 | Relegated |
| 11 | Markaryds IF | 22 | 4 | 4 | 14 | 29 | 58 | −29 | 16 | Relegated |
| 12 | Ryssby IF | 22 | 3 | 3 | 16 | 25 | 73 | −48 | 12 | Relegated |

=== Södra Götaland 1998 ===
| Pos | Team | Pld | W | D | L | GF | GA | GD | Pts | Promotion or relegation |
|---|---|---|---|---|---|---|---|---|---|---|
| 1 | Höllvikens GIF, Höllviksnäs | 22 | 12 | 3 | 7 | 38 | 24 | +14 | 39 | Promoted |
| 2 | Helsingborgs Södra BIS | 22 | 11 | 6 | 5 | 45 | 33 | +12 | 39 | Promotion Playoffs |
| 3 | Ängelholms FF | 22 | 9 | 8 | 5 | 50 | 28 | +22 | 35 | |
| 4 | Kirsebergs IF, Malmö | 22 | 9 | 7 | 6 | 42 | 28 | +14 | 34 | |
| 5 | Härslövs IK | 22 | 9 | 6 | 7 | 41 | 39 | +2 | 33 | |
| 6 | FBK Balkan, Malmö | 22 | 8 | 6 | 8 | 36 | 38 | −2 | 30 | |
| 7 | Malmö BI | 22 | 8 | 5 | 9 | 33 | 36 | −3 | 29 | |
| 8 | Klippans BIF | 22 | 8 | 5 | 9 | 40 | 49 | −9 | 29 | |
| 9 | Kulladals FF, Malmö | 22 | 7 | 7 | 8 | 34 | 37 | −3 | 28 | Relegation Playoffs – Relegated |
| 10 | Husie IF | 22 | 6 | 6 | 10 | 34 | 43 | −9 | 24 | Relegated |
| 11 | Veberöds AIF | 22 | 7 | 3 | 12 | 38 | 52 | −14 | 24 | Relegated |
| 12 | GIF Nike, Malmö | 22 | 5 | 4 | 13 | 37 | 61 | −24 | 19 | Relegated |
