= 1995 Division 3 (Swedish football) =

Swedish League Division 3
- Season: 1995
- Champions: Assi IF; IFK Östersund; Sandvikens IF; Vallentuna BK; Huddinge IF; Rynninge IK; Färjestadens GIF; IK Kongahälla; IK Tord; Ljungby IF; IF Leikin; Högaborgs BK
- Promoted: 12 teams above and: Alnö IF; IFK Österåker FK; Gullringens GoIF; Saxemara IF
- Relegated: 42 teams

Statistics of Swedish football Division 3 for the 1995 season.

== League standings ==
=== Norra Norrland 1995 ===
Pos	Team	Pld	W	D	L	GF	GA	GD	Pts	Promotion or relegation
1	Assi IF, Kalix	22	13	4	5	38	21	+17	43	Promoted
2	Täfteå IK	22	10	10	2	47	14	+33	40	Promotion Playoffs
3	Luleå SK	22	9	9	4	32	20	+12	36	
4	Blattnicksele IF	22	10	6	6	36	26	+10	36	
5	Anundsjö IF	22	11	3	8	40	33	+7	36	
6	Hedens IF, Boden	22	9	8	5	44	29	+15	35	
7	Umedalens IF, Umeå	22	9	5	8	41	24	+17	32	
8	IFK Kalix	22	9	4	9	45	34	+11	31	
9	Malmbergets AIF	22	7	10	5	37	28	+9	31	Relegation Playoffs
10	Hägglunds IoFK, Örnsköldsvik	22	6	3	13	22	37	−15	21	Relegated
11	Alviks IK, Luleå	22	5	5	12	20	39	−19	20	Relegated
12	Burträsk IK	22	0	1	21	14	111	−97	1	Relegated

=== Mellersta Norrland 1995 ===
Pos	Team	Pld	W	D	L	GF	GA	GD	Pts	Promotion or relegation
1	IFK Östersund	22	18	2	2	57	15	+42	56	Promoted
2	Alnö IF	22	17	4	1	58	14	+44	55	Promotion Playoffs – Promoted
3	Frösö IF	22	13	3	6	37	33	+4	42	
4	Selånger FK, Sundsvall	22	12	4	6	57	33	+24	40	
5	Krokom/Dvärsätts IF	22	9	3	10	45	44	+1	30	
6	Strands IF, Hudiksvall	22	9	3	10	37	42	−5	30	
7	Domsjö IF	22	7	6	9	32	33	−1	27	
8	Sollefteå GIF	22	7	5	10	32	44	−12	26	
9	IF Älgarna, Härnösand	22	6	6	10	23	31	−8	24	Relegation Playoffs – Relegated
10	Njurunda SK	22	7	2	13	33	58	−25	23	Relegated
11	Myssjö/Ovikens IF	22	3	2	17	21	63	−42	11	Relegated
12	Älandsbro AIK	22	2	4	16	28	50	−22	10	Relegated

=== Södra Norrland 1995 ===
Pos	Team	Pld	W	D	L	GF	GA	GD	Pts	Promotion or relegation
1	Sandvikens IF	22	17	3	2	81	28	+53	54	Promoted
2	IFK Gävle	22	14	4	4	55	22	+33	46	Promotion Playoffs
3	Korsnäs FK	22	10	5	7	39	33	+6	35	
4	Forssa BK	22	9	7	6	41	37	+4	34	
5	Kvarnsvedens IK	22	9	5	8	42	37	+5	32	
6	Slätta SK	22	8	4	10	31	42	−11	28	
7	Avesta AIK	22	8	4	10	28	48	−20	28	
8	IFK Mora FK	22	6	5	11	30	35	−5	23	
9	Stugsunds IK	22	6	5	11	41	55	−14	23	Relegation Playoffs – Relegated
10	Hamrånge GIF	22	7	2	13	32	50	−18	23	Relegated
11	Bollnäs GIF FF	22	5	7	10	19	42	−23	22	Relegated
12	Gestrike-Hammarby IF	22	6	3	13	32	42	−10	21	Relegated

=== Norra Svealand 1995 ===
Pos	Team	Pld	W	D	L	GF	GA	GD	Pts	Promotion or relegation
1	Vallentuna BK	22	16	4	2	67	22	+45	52	Promoted
2	IFK Österåker FK, Åkersberga	22	15	4	3	64	28	+36	49	Promotion Playoffs – Promoted
3	Täby IS	22	11	3	8	43	49	−6	36	
4	Sala FF	22	9	7	6	37	32	+5	34	
5	IK Bele, Järfälla	22	10	3	9	41	31	+10	33	
6	IF Vesta, Uppsala	22	8	8	6	39	25	+14	32	
7	Heby AIF	22	9	5	8	38	39	−1	32	
8	Sunnersta AIF	22	8	4	10	34	45	−11	28	
9	Bro IK, Upplands-Bro	22	8	4	10	43	55	−12	28	Relegation Playoffs – Relegated
10	FC Järfälla	22	5	4	13	26	45	−19	19	Relegated
11	Upsala IF, Uppsala	22	4	6	12	30	40	−10	18	Relegated
12	Riala GoIF	22	2	2	18	22	73	−51	8	Relegated

=== Östra Svealand 1995 ===
Pos	Team	Pld	W	D	L	GF	GA	GD	Pts	Promotion or relegation
1	Huddinge IF	22	12	6	4	55	27	+28	42	Promoted
2	Vagnhärads SK	22	11	7	4	40	20	+20	40	Promotion Playoffs
3	Gnesta FF	22	11	5	6	40	34	+6	38	
4	IFK Tumba FK	22	11	2	9	42	41	+1	35	
5	IFK Lidingö FK	22	10	5	7	28	31	−3	35	
6	BK Sport, Eskilstuna	22	9	4	9	39	36	+3	31	
7	Nykvarns SK	22	8	7	7	30	34	−4	31	
8	Råsunda IS, Solna	22	9	4	9	36	42	−6	31	
9	IFK Stockholm	22	6	10	6	20	22	−2	28	Relegation Playoffs
10	Eskilstuna Södra FF	22	7	5	10	35	44	−9	26	Relegated
11	Topkapi IK, Stockholm	22	4	3	15	39	55	−16	15	Relegated
12	Enskede IK	22	3	4	15	30	48	−18	13	Relegated

=== Västra Svealand 1995 ===
Pos	Team	Pld	W	D	L	GF	GA	GD	Pts	Promotion or relegation
1	Rynninge IK, Örebro	22	13	6	3	44	18	+26	45	Promoted
2	Filipstads FF	22	11	6	5	49	37	+12	39	Promotion Playoffs
3	Adolfsbergs IK, Örebro	22	9	8	5	32	29	+3	35	
4	IFK Kumla FK	22	8	8	6	36	29	+7	32	
5	Gideonsbergs IF, Västerås	22	8	6	8	45	40	+5	30	
6	Skiljebo SK, Västerås	22	8	6	8	36	35	+1	30	
7	FBK Karlstad	22	8	6	8	33	33	0	30	
8	KB Karlskoga	22	8	6	8	33	34	−1	30	
9	Säffle FF	22	7	7	8	45	47	−2	28	Relegation Playoffs
10	Köpings FF	22	6	7	9	34	41	−7	25	Relegated
11	Norrstrands IF, Karlstad	22	4	8	10	22	26	−4	20	Relegated
12	IK Arvika Fotboll	22	2	6	14	18	58	−40	12	Relegated

=== Nordöstra Götaland 1995 ===
Pos	Team	Pld	W	D	L	GF	GA	GD	Pts	Promotion or relegation
1	Färjestadens GIF	22	15	2	5	52	28	+24	47	Promoted
2	Gullringens GoIF	22	11	7	4	45	31	+14	40	Promotion Playoffs – Promoted
3	Västerviks FF	22	9	7	6	44	34	+10	34	
4	Smedby AIS, Norrköping	22	7	8	7	37	30	+7	29	
5	Tranås AIF	22	7	8	7	38	38	0	29	
6	IK Ramunder, Söderköping	22	7	8	7	41	42	−1	29	
7	Smedby BoIK, Kalmar	22	7	8	7	38	41	−3	29	
8	Mönsterås GIF	22	7	7	8	45	46	−1	28	
9	BK Zeros, Motala	22	8	4	10	35	39	−4	28	Relegation Playoffs – Relegated
10	IFK Kalmar	22	6	10	6	29	33	−4	28	Relegated
11	Vimmerby IF	22	4	7	11	30	44	−14	19	Relegated
12	IFK Västervik	22	3	6	13	29	57	−28	15	Relegated

=== Nordvästra Götaland 1995 ===
Pos	Team	Pld	W	D	L	GF	GA	GD	Pts	Promotion or relegation
1	IK Kongahälla, Kungälv	22	18	3	1	87	19	+68	57	Promoted
2	IFK Trollhättan	22	17	3	2	65	20	+45	54	Promotion Playoffs
3	Trollhättans FK	22	17	2	3	69	26	+43	53	
4	Lysekils FF	22	11	4	7	68	31	+37	37	
5	Ytterby IS	22	11	3	8	57	33	+24	36	
6	Inlands IF, Lilla Edet	22	9	2	11	56	53	+3	29	
7	Skepplanda BTK	22	8	1	13	34	54	−20	25	
8	Kungshamns IF	22	7	3	12	48	46	+2	24	
9	Skärhamns IK	22	7	3	12	37	45	−8	24	Relegation Playoffs
10	Kortedala IF	22	7	3	12	42	53	−11	24	Relegated
11	Götaholms BK, Göteborg	22	6	1	15	39	63	−24	19	Relegated
12	Bjurslätts IF, Göteborg	22	0	0	22	9	168	−159	0	Relegated

=== Mellersta Götaland 1995 ===
Pos	Team	Pld	W	D	L	GF	GA	GD	Pts	Promotion or relegation
1	IK Tord, Jönköping	22	20	1	1	61	10	+51	61	Promoted
2	Bors SK	22	12	2	8	40	31	+9	38	Promotion Playoffs
3	IFK Falköping	22	11	4	7	51	29	+22	37	
4	Götene IF	22	11	4	7	37	31	+6	37	
5	Töreboda IK	22	11	3	8	38	32	+6	36	
6	IFK Skövde FK	22	11	2	9	47	35	+12	35	
7	Gislaveds IS	22	10	2	10	41	38	+3	32	
8	Anderstorps IF	22	9	3	10	38	37	+1	30	
9	Burseryds IF	22	7	4	11	42	52	−10	25	Relegation Playoffs – Relegated
10	Jönköping Södra IF	22	6	3	13	30	46	−16	21	Relegated
11	Gnosjö IF	22	5	0	17	25	65	−40	15	Relegated
12	Skara IF	22	4	2	16	22	66	−44	14	Relegated

=== Sydöstra Götaland 1995 ===
Pos	Team	Pld	W	D	L	GF	GA	GD	Pts	Promotion or relegation
1	Ljungby IF	22	16	4	2	53	22	+31	52	Promoted
2	Saxemara IF	22	14	4	4	54	28	+26	46	Promotion Playoffs – Promoted
3	Växjö BK	22	14	3	5	53	29	+24	45	
4	Nybro IF	22	13	1	8	64	37	+27	40	
5	Åhus Horna BK	22	11	2	9	31	36	−5	35	
6	Strömsnäsbruks IF	22	10	3	9	36	38	−2	33	
7	IFK Osby	22	8	6	8	24	27	−3	30	
8	Sölvesborgs GoIF	22	7	4	11	33	42	−9	25	
9	Ronneby BK	22	6	4	12	42	48	−6	22	Relegation Playoffs – Relegated
10	Yngsjö IF	22	4	5	13	21	55	−34	17	Relegated
11	Alvesta GoIF	22	3	5	14	31	55	−24	14	Relegated
12	AIK Atlas, Sturkö	22	3	5	14	19	44	−25	14	Relegated

=== Sydvästra Götaland 1995 ===
Pos	Team	Pld	W	D	L	GF	GA	GD	Pts	Promotion or relegation
1	IF Leikin, Halmstad	22	15	5	2	62	25	+37	50	Promoted
2	Laholms FK	22	13	3	6	41	27	+14	42	Promotion Playoffs
3	Kinna IF	22	12	3	7	53	35	+18	39	
4	Mölnlycke IF	22	11	5	6	38	28	+10	38	
5	Varbergs BoIS	22	10	4	8	48	40	+8	34	
6	Vinbergs IF	22	9	4	9	39	30	+9	31	
7	Askims IK	22	8	6	8	42	45	−3	30	
8	Varbergs GIF	22	9	3	10	42	48	−6	30	
9	Fässbergs IF, Mölndal	22	7	4	11	42	60	−18	25	Relegation Playoffs
10	Tvååkers IF	22	7	2	13	34	50	−16	23	Relegated
11	IF Väster, Västra Frölunda	22	4	5	13	22	50	−28	17	Relegated
12	Lerums IS	22	3	4	15	31	56	−25	13	Relegated

=== Södra Götaland 1995 ===
Pos	Team	Pld	W	D	L	GF	GA	GD	Pts	Promotion or relegation
1	Högaborgs BK, Helsingborg	22	15	4	3	58	20	+38	49	Promoted
2	Ystads IF FF	22	13	5	4	53	33	+20	44	Promotion Playoffs
3	Husie IF	22	11	4	7	48	35	+13	37	
4	Höllvikens GIF, Höllviksnäs	22	9	7	6	37	32	+5	34	
5	Limhamns IF	22	8	9	5	41	38	+3	33	
6	Arlövs BI	22	10	2	10	46	37	+9	32	
7	BK Landora, Landskrona	22	8	7	7	32	37	−5	31	
8	Tomelilla IF	22	9	4	9	30	39	−9	31	
9	BK Olympic, Malmö	22	7	8	7	41	36	+5	29	Relegation Playoffs
10	Sjöbo IF	22	6	3	13	41	52	−11	21	Relegated
11	Ängelholms FF	22	4	3	15	26	58	−32	15	Relegated
12	NK Croatia, Malmö	22	3	2	17	28	74	−46	11	Relegated
