= 2000–01 Svenska Cupen =

Tournament details
- Country: Sweden

Final positions
- Champions: IF Elfsborg
- Runners-up: AIK

The 2000–01 Svenska Cupen was the 46th season of the main Swedish football Cup. The competition was concluded on 25 May 2001 with the final, held at Stadsparksvallen in Jönköping. The final was decided on a penalty shootout that IF Elfsborg won 9–8 against AIK.

== Second round ==
The 64 matches in this round were played on 23 and 24 August 2000.

| Team 1 | Score | Team 2 |
|---|---|---|
| Motala AIF | 1–4 | AIK |
| Ljungby IF | 0–1 | Halmstads BK |
| Skärhamns IK | 1–6 | Örgryte IS |
| Myresjö IF | 0–4 | Helsingborgs IF |
| Enköpings SK | 2–1 | IFK Norrköping |
| IF Lödde | 0–4 | Trelleborgs FF |
| Båstads GIF | 0–7 | Landskrona BoIS |
| Treby IF | 1–0 | Åhus Horna BK |
| Ängelholms FF | 0–1 | IF Elfsborg |
| Påarps GIF | 2–7 | Helsingborgs Södra BIS |
| Staffanstorps GIF | 1–0 | Högaborgs BK |
| Perstorps SK | 0–4 | Malmö FF |
| IFK Kalmar | 0–2 | Mjällby AIF |
| Västra Torsås IF | 0–6 | Östers IF |
| Mjölby Södra IF | 1–6 | Husqvarna FF |
| Hvetlanda GIF | 2–6 | Kalmar FF |
| Vinbergs IF | 1–5 | IFK Göteborg |
| Gånghesters SK | 0–6 | IK Kongahälla |
| Skogens IF | 0–3 | GAIS |
| Floda BoIF | 0–5 | Gunnilse IS |
| Lerkils IF | 0–5 | BK Häcken |
| Sandareds IF | 0–1 | Västra Frölunda IF |
| Åsebro IF | 2–1 | Vänersborgs IF |
| Slottskogen / Godhem IF | 1–0 | Gerdskens BK |
| GAIK / Kullen BK | 1–0 | Donsö IS |
| Inlands IF | 2–3 (gg) | Rosseröds IK |
| IFK Skövde | 3–1 | Ulvåkers IF |
| IFK Mariestad | 1–4 | Grimsås IF |
| Borens IK | 1–3 | BK Zeros |
| LSW IF | 2–4 | Åtvidabergs FF |
| Frövi IK | 0–7 | IF Sylvia |
| Säffle FF | 0–4 | Degerfors IF |
| IK Sturehov | 1–5 | Carlstad United BK |
| Laxå IF | 2–1 (gg) | Karlstads BK |
| Sala FF | 0–7 | Assyriska FF |
| Kungsörs SK | 1–11 | Västerås SK |
| Arboga Södra IF | 0–9 | Örebro SK |
| Karlslunds IF | 1–7 | Nacka FF |
| FC Krukan | 1–4 | Älvsjö AIK |
| Bollstanäs SK | 0–11 | Djurgårdens IF |
| Hargs BK | 1–0 | FC Café Opera Djursholm |
| Skultuna IS | 0–1 | Syrianska FC |
| IFK Tumba FK | 2–3 (gg) | Vallentuna BK |
| Heby AIF | 0–1 | IK Sirius |
| Garda IK | 2–4 | Spårvägens FF |
| IFK Viksjö | 1–5 | Arlanda FF |
| IFK Österåker | 3–2 | Huddinge IF |
| IF Brommapojkarna | 1–4 | Hammarby IF |
| Gestrike-Hammarby IF | 2–1 (gg) | Sandvikens IF |
| Korsnäs IF | 0–6 | IK Brage |
| Delsbo IF | 1–2 | Bollnäs GoIF |
| IFK Mora | 0–1 | Söderhamns FF |
| Forsa IF | 2–1 (gg) | Edsbyns IF |
| IFK Bergvik | 2–3 (gg) | Essviks AIF |
| IF Älgarna | 1–3 | GIF Sundsvall |
| Sandåkerns SK | 0–5 | Friska Viljor FC |
| Sörfors IF | 0–3 | Östersunds FK |
| Skellefteå AIK | 1–2 (gg) | Umeå FC |
| Sävar IK | 3–4 (gg) | IFK Holmsund |
| Holms SK | 1–2 | Gimonäs CK |
| Sävast AIF | 1–2 | IFK Luleå |
| Morön BK | 1–4 | Piteå IF |
| Gammelstads IF | 0–4 | Luleå FF |
| Hedens IF | 0–1 | Kiruna FF |

== Third round ==
Most of the matches in this round were played on 20 and 21 September 2000.

| Team 1 | Score | Team 2 |
|---|---|---|
| BK Zeros | 0–1 | IF Sylvia |
| Laxå IF | 2–3 | Husqvarna FF |
| IFK Luleå | 3–1 | Kiruna FF |
| Hargs BK | 1–3 | Assyriska FF |
| Gestrike-Hammarby IF | 0–2 | Spårvägens FF |
| Åsebro IF | 3–0 | Degerfors IF |
| Forsa IF | 3–6 | IK Brage |
| Mjällby AIF | 0–1 | Trelleborgs FF |
| Essviks AIF | 0–2 | Friska Viljor FC |
| Östersunds FK | 1–2 | GIF Sundsvall |
| IFK Österåker FK | 0–3 | Åtvidabergs FF |
| Piteå IF | 1–3 | Umeå FC |
| Treby IF | 1–10 | Landskrona BoIS |
| Söderhamns FF | 2–1 | IK Sirius |
| GAIK / Kullen BK | 0–2 | Gunnilse IS |
| Gimonäs CK | 1–2 | Luleå FF |
| Staffanstorps GIF | 1–2 (gg) | Helsingborgs Södra BIS |
| Carlstad United BK | 0–2 | Örebro SK |
| Arlanda FF | 1–2 | Vallentuna BK |
| Kalmar FF | 1–0 (gg) | Halmstads BK |
| Rosseröds IK | 0–3 | BK Häcken |
| Slottsskogen / Godhem IF | 0–4 | Västra Frölunda IF |
| Älvsjö AIK FF | 0–5 | Enköpings SK |
| IK Kongahälla | 1–6 | IFK Göteborg |
| Västerås SK FK | 1–3 | Hammarby IF |
| Nacka FF | 0–2 | Djurgårdens IF |
| IFK Skövde FK | 1–4 | IF Elfsborg |
| Grimsås IF | 1–4 | GAIS |
| Syrianska FC | 1–4 | AIK |
| Bollnäs GoIF | 4–3 | IFK Holmsund |
| Östers IF | 0–2 | Örgryte IS |
| Malmö FF | 2–1 (gg) | Helsingborgs IF |

== Fourth round ==
The 16 matches in this round were played between 11 October 2000 and 4 April 2001.

| Team 1 | Score | Team 2 |
11 October 2000
| Söderhamns FF | 2–0 | IK Brage |
28 March 2001
| IF Sylvia | 1–2 | BK Häcken |
31 March 2001
| Bollnäs GoIF | 0–5 | GIF Sundsvall |
| Husqvarna FF | 1–2 | IFK Göteborg |
| Kalmar FF | 2–3 | GAIS |
| Spårvägens FF | 1–2 | Örebro SK |
| Åtvidabergs FF | 0–4 | Örgryte IS |
1 April 2001
| Gunnilse IS | 2–6 | IF Elfsborg |
| Vallentuna BK | 2–5 | Hammarby IF |
| Landskrona BoIS | 0–2 | Trelleborgs FF |
2 April 2001
| AIK | 2–0 | Assyriska FF |
4 April 2001
| Enköpings SK | 3–4 | Djurgårdens IF |
| Friska Viljor FC | 1–0 | Umeå FC |
| Helsingborgs Södra BIS | 5–6 | Malmö FF |
| IFK Luleå | 2–3 | Luleå FF |
| Åsebro IF | 0–3 | Västra Frölunda IF |

== Fifth round ==
The 8 matches in this round were played between 12 April and 19 April 2001.

| Team 1 | Score | Team 2 |
12 April 2001
| BK Häcken | 0–1 | Malmö FF |
| Djurgårdens IF | 1–2 (gg) | IFK Göteborg |
| Hammarby IF | 0–2 | Örgryte IS |
| IF Elfsborg | 1–0 | Västra Frölunda IF |
13 April 2001
| Söderhamns FF | 0–2 | GAIS |
18 April 2001
| Trelleborgs FF | 2–0 | GIF Sundsvall |
| Örebro SK | 1–1 (p. 3–4) | AIK |
19 April 2001
| Luleå FF | 0–1 | Friska Viljor FC |

== Quarter-finals ==
The 4 matches in this round were played between 27 April and 3 May 2001.

| Team 1 | Score | Team 2 |
27 April 2001
| IFK Göteborg | 1–2 | Malmö FF |
2 May 2001
| GAIS | 3–0 | Friska Viljor FC |
3 May 2001
| AIK | 3–2 | Trelleborgs FF |
| Örgryte IS | 1–3 | IF Elfsborg |

== Semi-finals ==
The semi-finals were played on 10 and 11 May 2001.

| Team 1 | Score | Team 2 |
10 May 2001
| Malmö FF | 0–2 | AIK |
11 May 2001
| IF Elfsborg | 2–1 | GAIS |

== Final ==
The final was played on 25 May 2001 at the Stadsparksvallen, Jönköping.

25 May 2001
19:00 CET

| AIK | 1–1 (a.e.t.) | IF Elfsborg |
|---|---|---|
| Novaković 21' | Report | Klarström 47' |
Penalties
| Touma (penalty scored); Corneliusson (penalty missed); Thylander (penalty missed); Lagerlöf (penalty scored); D. Andersson (penalty scored); Lucic (penalty scored); Åslund (penalty scored); A. Andersson (penalty scored); Kibebe (penalty missed); Edman (penalty scored); P. Andersson (penalty scored); Touma (penalty missed) | 8–9 | (penalty missed) Andreasson; (penalty missed) M. Andersson; (penalty scored) Svensson; (penalty scored) Alexandersson; (penalty scored) Arvhage; (penalty scored) Klarström; (penalty scored) Gudmundsson; (penalty scored) Ung; (penalty missed) Strömberg; (penalty scored) Mohlin; (penalty scored) Wiland; (penalty scored) Mohlin |

Stadsparksvallen, Jönköping
Attendance: 6,364
Referee: Leif Sundell (Borlänge)
