= 2009 Division 3 (Swedish football) =

Swedish League Division 3
- Season: 2009
- Champions: Tegs SK; IFK Härnösand FF; Hudiksvalls ABK; Strömsbergs IF; Örebro SK Ungdom; FOC Farsta; Vimmerby IF; Holmalunds IF; Götene IF; VMA IK; Assyriska BK; Kvarnby IK
- Promoted: 12 teams above and: IFK Sundsvall; Rotebro IS FF; Karlstad BK; IK Tord
- Relegated: 36 teams

Statistics of Swedish football Division 3 for the 2009 season.

== League standings ==
=== Norra Norrland 2009 ===
Pos	Team	Pld	W	D	L	GF	GA	GD	Pts	Promotion or relegation
1	Tegs SK	22	13	7	2	55	24	+31	46	Promoted
2	Morön BK	22	11	6	5	57	41	+16	39	Promotion Playoffs
3	Gällivare Malmbergets FF	22	10	7	5	44	27	+17	37	
4	Sävast AIF	22	8	6	8	34	35	−1	30	
5	Notvikens IK	22	9	2	11	37	36	+1	29	
6	Norsjö IF	22	7	8	7	29	33	−4	29	
7	Ohtana/Aapua FF	22	8	4	10	37	34	+3	28	
8	Kiruna FF	22	7	6	9	26	28	−2	27	
9	Assi IF	22	7	5	10	34	37	−3	26	
10	IFK Kalix	22	7	5	10	28	65	−37	26	Relegated
11	Hemmingsmarks IF	22	7	4	11	36	42	−6	25	Relegated
12	Bergnäsets AIK	22	6	4	12	28	43	−15	22	Relegated

=== Mellersta Norrland 2009 ===
Pos	Team	Pld	W	D	L	GF	GA	GD	Pts	Promotion or relegation
1	IFK Härnösand FF	22	15	2	5	69	32	+37	47	Promoted
2	IFK Sundsvall	22	13	6	3	67	32	+35	45	Promotion Playoffs - Promoted
3	Selånger FK	22	13	2	7	55	44	+11	41	
4	Kubikenborgs IF	22	11	4	7	56	42	+14	37	
5	Medskogsbrons BK	22	11	3	8	39	28	+11	36	
6	IFK Östersund	22	10	5	7	43	37	+6	35	
7	Frösö IF	22	7	9	6	38	31	+7	30	
8	IFK Timrå	22	8	3	11	37	41	−4	27	
9	Junsele IF	22	8	2	12	36	51	−15	26	
10	Alsens IF	22	6	4	12	32	53	−21	22	Relegated
11	Graninge FF	22	4	4	14	26	57	−31	16	Relegated
12	Sandåkerns SK	22	1	6	15	24	74	−50	9	Relegated

=== Södra Norrland 2009 ===
Pos	Team	Pld	W	D	L	GF	GA	GD	Pts	Promotion or relegation
1	Hudiksvalls ABK	22	17	0	5	70	27	+43	51	Promoted
2	Rengsjö SK	22	14	5	3	59	32	+27	47	Promotion Playoffs
3	IK Huge	22	13	7	2	42	14	+28	46	
4	Korsnäs IF FK	22	9	5	8	38	29	+9	32	
5	Valbo FF	22	9	2	11	37	45	−8	29	
6	Kvarnsvedens IK	22	8	4	10	39	37	+2	28	
7	Strands IF	22	8	4	10	33	42	−9	28	
8	Dala-Järna IK	22	6	9	7	40	28	+12	27	
9	Brynäs IF FK	22	7	6	9	32	33	−1	27	
10	IF Tunabro	22	7	6	9	34	42	−8	27	Relegated
11	Järbo IF	22	5	2	15	28	66	−38	17	Relegated
12	Ytterhogdals IK	22	2	4	16	17	74	−57	10	Relegated

=== Norra Svealand 2009 ===
Pos	Team	Pld	W	D	L	GF	GA	GD	Pts	Promotion or relegation
1	Strömsbergs IF	22	15	4	3	67	23	+44	49	Promoted
2	Rotebro IS FF	22	12	6	4	56	34	+22	42	Promotion Playoffs - Promoted
3	Bollstanäs SK	22	13	2	7	52	34	+18	41	
4	Assyriska FF Ungdom	22	11	4	7	55	39	+16	37	
5	Täby IS	22	11	3	8	45	37	+8	36	
6	Heby AIF	22	9	5	8	39	39	0	32	
7	BKV Norrtälje	22	9	4	9	42	39	+3	31	
8	FC Järfälla	22	9	3	10	44	51	−7	30	
9	Karlbergs BK	22	8	3	11	31	45	−14	27	
10	Gimo IF FK	22	7	4	11	32	41	−9	25	Relegated
11	Gamlis FF	22	3	3	16	34	64	−30	12	Relegated
12	Sandvikens AIK FK	22	3	3	16	28	79	−51	12	Relegated

=== Västra Svealand 2009 ===
Pos	Team	Pld	W	D	L	GF	GA	GD	Pts	Promotion or relegation
1	Örebro SK Ungdom	22	13	8	1	60	22	+38	47	Promoted
2	Karlstad BK	22	14	4	4	73	38	+35	46	Promotion Playoffs - Promoted
3	FBK Karlstad	22	14	3	5	41	29	+12	45	
4	Rynninge IK	22	12	5	5	60	36	+24	41	
5	IFK Ölme	22	9	5	8	40	40	0	32	
6	Örebro Syrianska BK	22	8	7	7	29	35	−6	31	
7	IFK Örebro	22	8	3	11	32	36	−4	27	
8	IFK Sunne	22	5	8	9	31	37	−6	23	
9	Adolfsbergs IK	22	6	5	11	26	36	−10	23	
10	Sköllersta IF	22	6	3	13	24	54	−30	21	Relegated
11	Kungsör BK	22	3	6	13	35	54	−19	15	Relegated
12	Arboga Södra IF	22	4	3	15	29	63	−34	15	Relegated

=== Södra Svealand 2009 ===
Pos	Team	Pld	W	D	L	GF	GA	GD	Pts	Promotion or relegation
1	FOC Farsta	22	16	1	5	62	34	+28	49	Promoted
2	Spårvägens FF	22	14	3	5	45	23	+22	45	Promotion Playoffs
3	Huddinge IF	22	14	1	7	65	37	+28	43	
4	Tyresö FF	22	12	3	7	39	23	+16	39	
5	Enhörna IF	22	10	3	9	42	32	+10	33	
6	Konyaspor KIF	22	10	3	9	32	29	+3	33	
7	IFK Eskilstuna	22	9	3	10	40	38	+2	30	
8	Bagarmossens BK	22	9	2	11	41	45	−4	29	
9	IK Tellus	22	8	5	9	33	42	−9	29	
10	Rågsveds IF	22	7	5	10	34	38	−4	26	Relegated
11	Vasasällskapet FK	22	4	2	16	24	60	−36	14	Relegated
12	Djurgårdsbrunns FC	22	3	1	18	24	80	−56	10	Relegated

=== Nordöstra Götaland 2009 ===
Pos	Team	Pld	W	D	L	GF	GA	GD	Pts	Promotion or relegation
1	Vimmerby IF	22	15	2	5	67	25	+42	47	Promoted
2	IK Tord	22	14	3	5	49	25	+24	45	Promotion Playoffs - Promoted
3	IK Östria Lambohov	22	11	3	8	39	32	+7	36	
4	Assyriska IF Norrköping	22	9	7	6	30	29	+1	34	
5	Gullringens GOIF	22	10	1	11	31	38	−7	31	
6	IF Hagapojkarna	22	8	5	9	37	33	+4	29	
7	LSW IF	22	8	5	9	38	41	−3	29	
8	Kisa BK	22	8	5	9	26	37	−11	29	
9	Söderköpings IK	22	8	4	10	25	31	−6	28	
10	Lindö FF	22	9	1	12	37	48	−11	28	Relegated
11	Råslätts SK	22	7	6	9	36	35	+1	27	Relegated
12	Syrianska KF	22	1	6	15	23	64	−41	9	Relegated

=== Nordvästra Götaland 2009 ===
Pos	Team	Pld	W	D	L	GF	GA	GD	Pts	Promotion or relegation
1	Holmalunds IF	22	15	4	3	65	21	+44	49	Promoted
2	Lerums IS	22	13	5	4	59	29	+30	44	Promotion Playoffs
3	IF Warta	22	13	4	5	44	30	+14	43	
4	Skoftebyns IF	22	11	5	6	52	32	+20	38	
5	Sävedalens IF	22	10	8	4	42	24	+18	38	
6	Lilla Edets IF	22	9	5	8	37	36	+1	32	
7	IF Viken	22	7	5	10	38	46	−8	26	
8	IFK Trollhättan	22	6	6	10	37	42	−5	24	
9	Åsebro IF	22	6	5	11	41	55	−14	23	
10	IK Kongahälla	22	5	7	10	26	42	−16	22	Relegated
11	Kungshamns IF	22	4	5	13	26	61	−35	17	Relegated
12	Lärje-Angereds IF	22	2	3	17	21	70	−49	9	Relegated

=== Mellersta Götaland 2009 ===
Pos	Team	Pld	W	D	L	GF	GA	GD	Pts	Promotion or relegation
1	Götene IF	22	16	3	3	50	23	+27	51	Promoted
2	IFK Mariestad	22	15	4	3	57	21	+36	49	Promotion Playoffs
3	IF Heimer	22	11	3	8	50	40	+10	36	
4	Bollebygds IF	22	10	5	7	41	35	+6	35	
5	Gislaveds IS	22	10	4	8	51	39	+12	34	
6	Mariedals IK	22	9	4	9	27	30	−3	31	
7	Ulvåkers IF	22	9	3	10	40	44	−4	30	
8	Skene IF	22	6	7	9	26	31	−5	25	
9	Tibro AIK FK	22	7	4	11	45	51	−6	25	
10	Grimsås IF	22	7	4	11	37	46	−9	25	Relegated
11	Åsarp-Trädet FK	22	5	4	13	28	48	−20	19	Relegated
12	Byttorps IF	22	2	5	15	27	71	−44	11	Relegated

=== Sydöstra Götaland 2009 ===
Pos	Team	Pld	W	D	L	GF	GA	GD	Pts	Promotion or relegation
1	VMA IK	22	14	2	6	67	37	+30	44	Promoted
2	Rydaholms GoIF	22	13	5	4	47	31	+16	44	Promotion Playoffs
3	Oskarshamns AIK	22	13	3	6	62	34	+28	42	
4	Älmhults IF	22	12	5	5	50	31	+19	41	
5	Lyckeby GoIF	22	12	4	6	44	37	+7	40	
6	Växjö BK	22	12	3	7	36	24	+12	39	
7	Sölvesborgs GoIF	22	9	6	7	39	35	+4	33	
8	Saxemara IF	22	6	6	10	32	43	−11	24	
9	FK Älmeboda/Linneryd	22	6	5	11	31	48	−17	23	
10	IFK Berga	22	5	4	13	36	50	−14	19	Relegated
11	Gransholms IF	22	6	1	15	21	47	−26	19	Relegated
12	Vetlanda FF	22	2	0	20	21	69	−48	6	Relegated

=== Sydvästra Götaland 2009 ===
Pos	Team	Pld	W	D	L	GF	GA	GD	Pts	Promotion or relegation
1	Assyriska BK	22	16	5	1	50	14	+36	53	Promoted
2	Tvååkers IF	22	12	7	3	47	31	+16	43	Promotion Playoffs
3	Höganäs BK	22	12	6	4	58	32	+26	42	
4	Lerkils IF	22	11	5	6	53	35	+18	38	
5	Påarps GIF	22	10	3	9	44	35	+9	33	
6	IFK Fjärås	22	9	5	8	34	34	0	32	
7	Trönninge BK	22	7	10	5	42	34	+8	31	
8	Laholms FK	22	6	6	10	34	41	−7	24	
9	IF Väster	22	6	6	10	32	40	−8	24	
10	Slottsskogen/Godhem IF	22	6	2	14	38	57	−19	20	Relegated
11	Dalen/Krokslätts FF	22	4	3	15	20	46	−26	15	Relegated
12	Åstorps FF	22	3	2	17	16	69	−53	11	Relegated

=== Södra Götaland 2009 ===
Pos	Team	Pld	W	D	L	GF	GA	GD	Pts	Promotion or relegation
1	Kvarnby IK	22	11	7	4	49	23	+26	40	Promoted
2	FC Trelleborg	22	11	5	6	44	37	+7	38	Promotion Playoffs
3	Nosaby IF	22	11	4	7	48	24	+24	37	
4	Eslövs BK	22	10	4	8	33	31	+2	34	
5	IFK Trelleborg	22	8	7	7	33	40	−7	31	
6	MF Pelister	22	9	3	10	42	52	−10	30	
7	FBK Balkan	22	9	2	11	42	46	−4	29	
8	Markaryds IF	22	7	7	8	37	42	−5	28	
9	Malmö City FC	22	5	10	7	43	42	+1	25	
10	IF Lödde	22	5	9	8	34	44	−10	24	Relegated
11	Tomelilla IF	22	5	8	9	30	41	−11	23	Relegated
12	Veberöds AIF	22	5	6	11	36	49	−13	21	Relegated
