= Daniel Ung =

Swedish footballer (born 1975)

Personal information
- Date of birth: 19 October 1975
- Height: 1.86 m (6 ft 1 in)
- Position: Right back

Youth career
- 1982–: IFK Örby

Senior career*
Years	Team	Apps	(Gls)
–1994	IFK Örby		
1995–2003	IF Elfsborg		
2004–2006	Norrby IF		
- * Club domestic league appearances and goals

Daniel Ung (born 19 October 1975) is a Swedish retired footballer who played as a right back.

He hails from Mark. He started playing as a child in IFK Örby, continuing on their senior teams in lower divisions. He played in the Allsvenskan for IF Elfsborg from 1997 to 2003. As Elfsborg returned to Allsvenskan and Ung made his debut there, Göteborgs-Posten praised how the club "in the classical Elfsborgs way have vacuumed the ground and found rare plants such as the fresh back Daniel Ung".

However, he became known for never scoring in the Allsvenskan, about which he was "often reminded" by people around the city. Several years after his retirement, he "was still hearing it". His first trophy with Elfsborg was the 2000–01 Svenska Cupen.

Having lost the entire 2000 season to injury, he sustained a knee injury in September 2002 and had to see the physician Leif Swärd. Ung's contract was not renewed after the 2003 season. He instead joined city minnows Norrby IF.

Ung became manager of the women's team of Kronängs IF ahead of the 2020 season.

== Personal life ==
He was nicknamed "Dunga", based on his own name (D. Ung) but also on the Brazilian footballer.

He married, had two children, settled in the Borås borough of Kristineberg, and worked in IT systems development.
