= Heby =

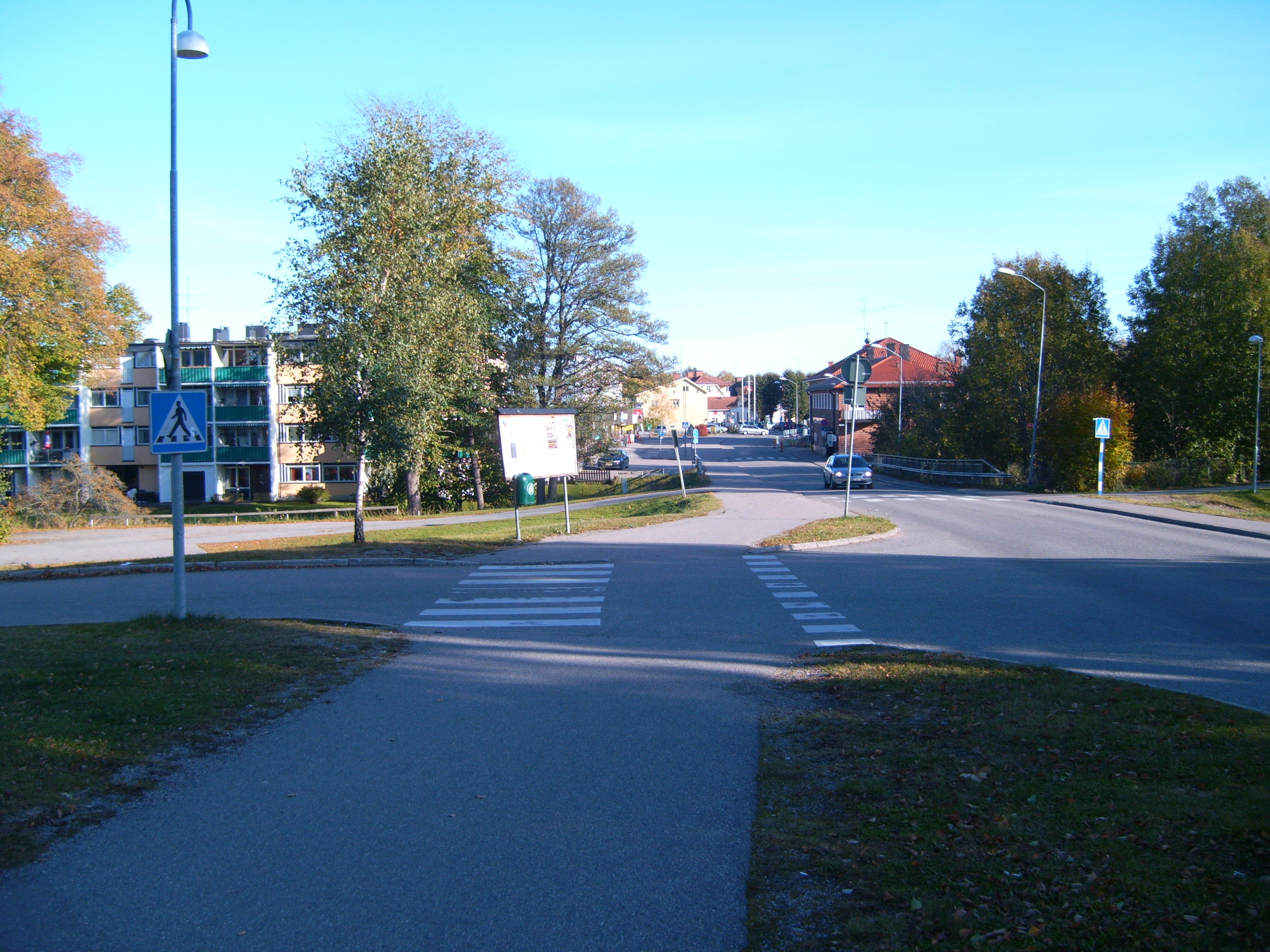
- Streets in Heby

- Location within Uppsala Location within Sweden
- Coordinates: 59°56′N 16°53′E
- Country: Sweden
- Province: Uppland
- County: Uppsala County
- Municipality: Heby Municipality

Area
  - Total: 3.54 km^{2} (1.37 sq mi)

Population (31 December 2020)
  - Total: 2,833
  - Density: 800/km^{2} (2,070/sq mi)
- Time zone: UTC+1 (CET)
  - Summer (DST): UTC+2 (CEST)

Heby is a locality and the seat of Heby Municipality in Uppsala County, Sweden, with 2,550 inhabitants in 2010.

== Sports ==
The following sports clubs are located in Heby:

- Heby AIF
