= Ryssby IF =

Swedish football club

- Full name: Ryssby Idrottsförening
- Nickname: RIF
- Founded: 1932
- Ground: Lunnavallen; Ryssby; Sweden
- Chairman: Gunnar Andersson
- Head coach: Håkan Andersson
- League: Division 3 Sydöstra Götaland
- 2010: Division 4 Småland Elit Västra, 4th (Promoted)
Home colours	Away colours

Ryssby IF is a Swedish football club located in Ryssby in Ljungby Municipality, Kronoberg County.

== Background ==
The club was started in 1932 by 21 sports enthusiasts from Ryssby and Målaskog. The first football field was at Tesås and was inaugurated in August 1932 with a match against Mörhult IF. The home side won 3–1.

In the early 1940s operations moved to Ryssby and a new name Ryssby Idrottsklubb was adopted. A few years later in 1948 the name was changed again, this time to Ryssby Idrottsförening. In 2004 the club began building a new clubhouse with new changing rooms, kiosk and stores. The new facility was opened in 2005.

Since their foundation Ryssby IF has participated mainly in the middle and lower divisions of the Swedish football league system. The club currently plays in Division 3 Sydöstra Götaland which is the fifth tier of Swedish football. They play their home matches at the Lunnavallen in Ryssby.

Ryssby IF are affiliated to Smålands Fotbollförbund.

== Recent history ==
In recent seasons Ryssby IF have competed in the following divisions:

2011 - Division III, Sydöstra Götaland
2010 - Division IV, Småland Elit Västra
2009 - Division IV, Småland Elit Västra
2008 - Division IV, Småland Elit Västra
2007 - Division IV, Småland Västra Elit
2007 - Division IV, Småland Elit Norra
2006 - Division IV, Småland Sydvästra
2005 - Division IV, Småland Sydvästra
2004 - Division IV, Småland Sydvästra
2003 - Division IV, Småland Sydvästra
2002 - Division IV, Småland Nordvästra
2000 - Division IV, Småland Sydvästra
1999 - Division IV, Småland Sydvästra
1998 - Division III, Sydvästra Götaland
1997 - Division IV, Småland Sydvästra
1996 - Division III, Sydöstra Götaland
1995 - Division IV, Småland Sydvästra
1994 - Division IV, Småland Sydvästra
1993 - Division IV, Småland Sydvästra

== Attendances ==
In recent seasons Ryssby IF have had the following average attendances:

Season	Average attendance	Division / Section	Level
2008	Not available	Div 4 Småland Elit Västra	Tier 6
2009	81	Div 4 Småland Elit Västra	Tier 6
2010	84	Div 4 Småland Elit Västra	Tier 6

* Attendances are provided in the Publikliga sections of the Svenska Fotbollförbundet website.
