= Brunflo FK =

Swedish football club

- Full name: Brunflo Fotbollklubb
- Founded: 1974
- Ground: Åkreäng; Brunflo; Sweden
- Chairman: Torgny Röhdin
- Head coach: Adam Mattiasson
- League: Division 4 Jämtland/Härjedalen
Home colours

Brunflo FK is a Swedish football club located in Brunflo.

== Background ==
Brunflo FK currently plays in Division 3 mellersta norrland which is the fifth tier of Swedish football. They play their home matches at the Åkreäng in Brunflo. (Capacity 500)

The club is affiliated to Jämtland-Härjedalens Fotbollförbund.

== Season to season ==
Season	Level	Division	Section	Position	Movements
1993	Tier 5	Division 4	Jämtland/Härjedalen	2nd	
1994	Tier 5	Division 4	Jämtland/Härjedalen	3rd	
1995	Tier 5	Division 4	Jämtland/Härjedalen	2nd	Promotion Playoffs – Promoted
1996	Tier 4	Division 3	Mellersta Norrland	2nd	
1997	Tier 4	Division 3	Mellersta Norrland	10th	Relegated
1998	Tier 5	Division 4	Jämtland/Härjedalen	5th	
1999	Tier 5	Division 4	Jämtland/Härjedalen	6th	
2000	Tier 5	Division 4	Jämtland/Härjedalen	8th	
2001	Tier 5	Division 4	Jämtland/Härjedalen	8th	
2002	Tier 5	Division 4	Jämtland/Härjedalen	5th	
2003	Tier 5	Division 4	Jämtland/Härjedalen	4th	
2004	Tier 5	Division 4	Jämtland/Härjedalen	2nd	
2005	Tier 5	Division 4	Jämtland/Härjedalen	6th	
2006*	Tier 6	Division 4	Jämtland/Härjedalen	6th	
2007	Tier 6	Division 4	Jämtland/Härjedalen	6th	
2008	Tier 6	Division 4	Jämtland/Härjedalen	3rd	
2009	Tier 6	Division 4	Jämtland/Härjedalen	4th	
2010	Tier 6	Division 4	Jämtland/Härjedalen	2nd	
2011	Tier 6	Division 4	Jämtland/Härjedalen	3rd	Promotion Playoffs – Promoted
2012	Tier 5	Division 3	Jämtland/Härjedalen	7th	
2013	Tier 5	Division 3	Jämtland/Härjedalen	3rd	
2014	Tier 5	Division 3	Jämtland/Härjedalen	8th	

* League restructuring in 2006 resulted in a new division being created at Tier 3 and subsequent divisions dropping a level.
