= IFK Örby =

Swedish football club

- Full name: Idrottsföreningen Kamraterna Örby
- Founded: 1926
- Ground: Örby IP; Örby; Sweden
- Chairman: Jesper Park
- League: Division 4 Västergötland Södra
| Home colours | Away colours |

IFK Örby is a Swedish football club located in Örby, Mark.

== Background ==
IFK Örby currently plays in Division 4 Västergötland Södra which is the sixth tier of Swedish football. They play their home matches at the Örby IP in Örby.

The club is affiliated to Västergötlands Fotbollförbund.

== Season to season ==
In their most successful period IFK Örby competed in the following divisions:

| Season | Level | Division | Section | Position | Movements |
|---|---|---|---|---|---|
| 1960 | Tier 4 | Division 4 | Västergötland Södra | 3rd | |
| 1961 | Tier 4 | Division 4 | Västergötland Södra | 1st | Promoted |
| 1962 | Tier 3 | Division 3 | Sydvästra Götaland | 5th | |
| 1963 | Tier 3 | Division 3 | Sydvästra Götaland | 10th | Relegated |
| 1964 | Tier 4 | Division 4 | Västergötland Södra | 6th | |
| 1965 | Tier 4 | Division 4 | Västergötland Södra | 4th | |
| 1966 | Tier 4 | Division 4 | Västergötland Södra | 9th | |
| 1967 | Tier 4 | Division 4 | Västergötland Södra | 9th | |
| 1968 | Tier 4 | Division 4 | Västergötland Södra | 6th | |
| 1969 | Tier 4 | Division 4 | Västergötland Södra | 1st | Promoted |
| 1970 | Tier 3 | Division 3 | Sydvästra Götaland | 9th | |
| 1971 | Tier 3 | Division 3 | Sydvästra Götaland | 7th | |
| 1972 | Tier 3 | Division 3 | Sydvästra Götaland | 7th | Relegated |
| 1973 | Tier 3 | Division 3 | Sydvästra Götaland | 11th | Relegated |
| 1974 | Tier 4 | Division 4 | Västergötland Södra | 4th | |

In recent seasons IFK Örby have competed in the following divisions:

| Season | Level | Division | Section | Position | Movements |
|---|---|---|---|---|---|
| 1994 | Tier 6 | Division 5 | Västergötland Södra | | Promoted |
| 1995 | Tier 5 | Division 4 | Västergötland Södra | 6th | |
| 1996 | Tier 5 | Division 4 | Västergötland Södra | 8th | |
| 1997 | Tier 5 | Division 4 | Västergötland Södra | 1st | Promoted |
| 1998 | Tier 4 | Division 3 | Sydvästra Götaland | 10th | Relegated |
| 1999 | Tier 5 | Division 4 | Västergötland Södra | 3rd | |
| 2000 | Tier 5 | Division 4 | Västergötland Södra | 9th | |
| 2001 | Tier 5 | Division 4 | Västergötland Södra | 3rd | |
| 2002 | Tier 5 | Division 4 | Västergötland Södra | 3rd | |
| 2003 | Tier 5 | Division 4 | Västergötland Södra | 2nd | Promotion Playoffs |
| 2004 | Tier 5 | Division 4 | Västergötland Södra | 2nd | Promotion Playoffs |
| 2005 | Tier 5 | Division 4 | Västergötland Södra | 2nd | Playoffs |
| 2006* | Tier 5 | Division 3 | Mellersta Götaland | 11th | Relegated |
| 2007 | Tier 6 | Division 4 | Västergötland Södra | 1st | Promoted |
| 2008 | Tier 5 | Division 3 | Sydvästra Götaland | 11th | Relegated |
| 2009 | Tier 6 | Division 4 | Västergötland Södra | 4th | |
| 2010 | Tier 6 | Division 4 | Västergötland Södra | 3rd | |
| 2011 | Tier 6 | Division 4 | Västergötland Södra | | |

* League restructuring in 2006 resulted in a new division being created at Tier 3 and subsequent divisions dropping a level.
