= Vagnhärads SK =

Swedish football club

- Full name: Vagnhärads Sportklubb
- Founded: 1921
- Dissolved: 8 March 2013
- Ground: Häradsvallen; Vagnhärad; Sweden
- Chairman: Pär Corell
- Manager: Anders Lindgren
- Coach: Ulf Pettersson
- League: Division 3 Östra Svealand
- 2009: Division 4 Södermanland, 1st (Promoted)
Home colours

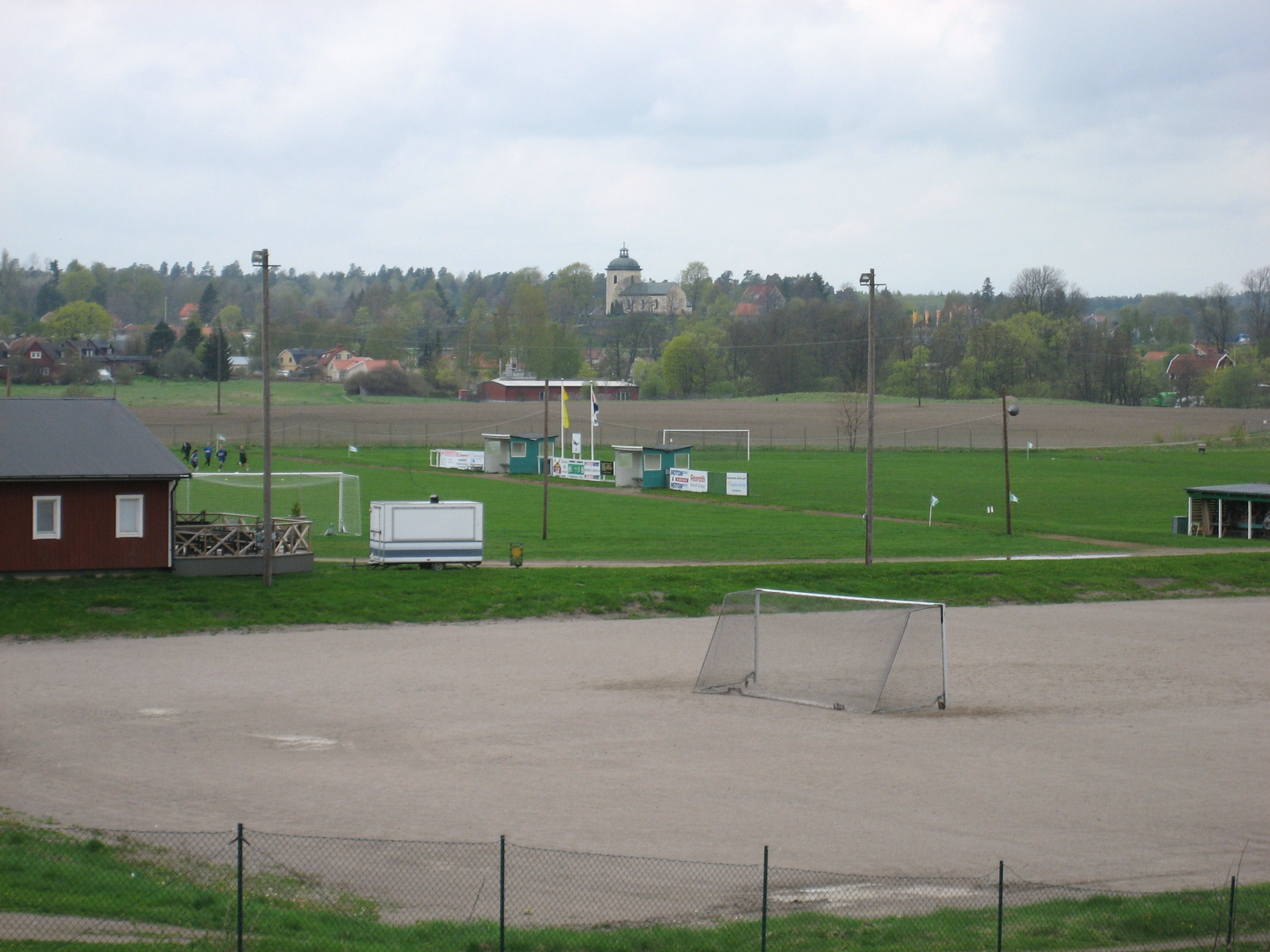
Häradsvallen

Vagnhärads SK was a Swedish football club, located in Vagnhärad, in Trosa Municipality, Södermanland County.

== Background ==
Vagnhärads Sportklubb was a sports club which was formed in 1921. Over the years the other sports have been dropped and the club now concentrates on football.

Since their foundation Vagnhärads SK has participated mainly in the middle and lower divisions of the Swedish football league system. The club currently plays in Division 3 Östra Svealand which is the fifth tier of Swedish football. They play their home matches at the Häradsvallen in Vagnhärad. In October 2007 the club hosted the Brazil national team in connection with an international against Ghana at the Råsunda Stadium.

Vagnhärads SK are affiliated to the Södermanlands Fotbollförbund. The club dissolved on 8 March 2013 and merged with Trosa IF, to the new club Trosa-Vagnhärad SK.

== Recent history ==
In recent seasons Vagnhärads SK have competed in the following divisions:

2012 Division III, Östra Svealand
2011 Division III, Östra Svealand
2010 Division III, Östra Svealand
2009 Division IV, Södermanland
2008 Division III, Södra Svealand
2007 Division III, Östra Svealand
2006 Division III, Östra Svealand
2005 Division IV, Södermanland
2004 Division IV, Södermanland
2003 Division IV, Södermanland
2002 Division IV, Södermanland
2001 Division V, Södermanland
2000 Division VI, Södermanland Södra
1999 Division V, Södermanland Södra
1998 Division IV, Södermanland
1997 Division III, Östra Svealand
1996 Division III, Östra Svealand
1995 Division III, Östra Svealand
1994 Division III, Östra Svealand
1993 Division III, Östra Svealand

== Women Football ==
The first team of the women football section, played until his disbanding in the Damer Division 5 A.
