= Råsunda IS =

Swedish football club

- Full name: Råsunda Idrotssällskap
- Founded: 1912
- Ground: Skytteholms IP; Solna; Sweden
- Capacity: 3,000
- Coach: Lennart Moström; Tomas Nyberg
- League: Division 6 Stockholm B
- 2021: Division 6 Stockholm B, 9th (Relegated)
| Home colours | Away colours |

Råsunda IS (Swedish pronunciation: [ˈrôːˌsɵnːda]) is a Swedish football club based in Solna.

== Background ==
Råsunda Idrotssällskap is a sports club from Råsunda in Solna which was formed in 1912. The club participates in football and bandy but in the past has also been active in ice-hockey and swimming. In 1947 the club played one season in Sweden's top bandy division.

Since their foundation Råsunda IS has participated mainly in the middle divisions of the Swedish football league system, reaching their pinnacle in 1964, 1965, 1968, 1969 and 1971 when they played in Division 2 which at that time was the second tier of Swedish football. The club currently plays in Division Division 6 Stockholm B which is the eighth tier of Swedish football. They play their home matches at the Skytteholms IP in Solna.

Råsunda IS are affiliated to Stockholms Fotbollförbund.

== Recent history ==
In recent seasons Råsunda IS have competed in the following divisions:

2021 – Division VI, Stockholm B
2020 – Division VII, Stockholm C
2019 – Division VI, Stockholm B
2018 – Division VI, Stockholm B
2017 – Division VI, Stockholm B
2016 – Division VI, Stockholm B
2015 – Division VI, Stockholm B
2014 – Division V, Stockholm Norra
2013 – Division IV, Stockholm Mellersta
2012 – Division III, Norra Svealand
2011 – Division III, Norra Svealand
2010 – Division III, Norra Svealand
2009 – Division II, Norra Svealand
2008 – Division II, Norra Svealand
2007 – Division III, Norra Svealand
2006 – Division III, Norra Svealand
2005 – Division IV, Stockholm Mellersta
2004 – Division IV, Stockholm Mellersta
2002 – Division IV, Stockholm Mellersta
2001 – Division IV, Stockholm Mellersta
2000 – Division IV, Stockholm Mellersta
1999 – Division IV, Stockholm Mellersta
1998 – Division IV, Stockholm Mellersta
1997 – Division III, Östra Svealand
1996 – Division III, Östra Svealand
1995 – Division III, Östra Svealand
1994 – Division IV, Stockholm Mellersta
1993 – Division III, Norra Svealand

== Attendances ==
In recent seasons Råsunda IS have had the following average attendances:

| Season | Average attendance | Division / Section | Level |
|---|---|---|---|
| 2005 | Not available | Div 4 Stockholm Mellersta | Tier 5 |
| 2006 | 73 | Div 3 Norra Svealand | Tier 5 |
| 2007 | 119 | Div 3 Norra Svealand | Tier 5 |
| 2008 | 94 | Div 2 Norra Svealand | Tier 4 |
| 2009 | 93 | Div 2 Norra Svealand | Tier 4 |
| 2010 | 70 | Div 3 Norra Svealand | Tier 5 |
| 2011 | 46 | Div 3 Norra Svealand | Tier 5 |
| 2012 | 65 | Div 3 Norra Svealand | Tier 5 |
| 2013 | 32 | Div 4 Stockholm Mellersta | Tier 6 |
| 2014 | 37 | Div 5 Stockholm Norra | Tier 7 |
| 2015 | 23 | Div 6 Stockholm B | Tier 8 |
| 2016 | 22 | Div 6 Stockholm B | Tier 8 |
| 2017 | 18 | Div 6 Stockholm B | Tier 8 |
| 2018 | Not Available | Div 6 Stockholm B | Tier 8 |

* Attendances are provided in the Publikliga sections of the Svenska Fotbollförbundet website.

== Current squad ==
Note: Flags indicate national team as defined under FIFA eligibility rules; some limited exceptions apply. Players may hold more than one non-FIFA nationality.

| No. | Pos. | Nation | Player |
|---|---|---|---|
| — | GK | SWE | Emil Fnine |
| — | GK | SWE | Joakim Fridlund |
| — | GK | SWE | John Olweny |
| — | DF | SWE | Dennis Foss |
| — | DF | SWE | Jesper Lindgren |
| — | DF | SWE | Sheriff Njie |
| — | DF | SWE | Olle Nyberg |
| — | DF | ROU | Mihai Popescu |
| — | DF | SWE | Gustaf Reinebo |
| — | DF | SWE | Johan Wallin |
| — | MF | CRO | Robert Babic |
| — | MF | SWE | Jacob Ericsson |

| No. | Pos. | Nation | Player |
|---|---|---|---|
| — | MF | SWE | Erik Gunnarsson |
| — | MF | SWE | Jonathan Halef |
| — | MF | SWE | Isper Igualikinya |
| — | MF | SWE | Dennis Lunnelid |
| — | MF | SWE | Robin Moström |
| — | MF | SWE | Jesper Måwe |
| — | MF | SWE | Christoffer Orfanidis |
| — | MF | SWE | Robert Pettee |
| — | MF | SWE | Mazdak Sarraf |
| — | MF | SWE | Mustafa Özmen |
| — | FW | SWE | Tomas Amanuel |
| — | FW | SWE | Bryan Massa |
