= Anderstorps IF =

Swedish football club

- Full name: Anderstorps idrottsförening
- Sport: association football
- Founded: 1927
- Based in: Anderstorp, Sweden
- Arena: Anderstorps IP

Anderstorps IF is a sports club in Anderstorp, Sweden, established in 1927.

The women's soccer team played in the Swedish top division in 1979.

Billy Lansdowne and Billy Lansdowne Junior have both played games for the club.
