= Säters IF =

Swedish football club

Säters IF FK
- Full name: Säters Idrottsförening Fotbollsklubb
- Nickname(s): SIF
- Founded: 26 July 1907
- Ground: Säters IP; Säter; Sweden
- Capacity: 650
- Chairman: Johnny Lindqvist
- Head coach: Elmostapha Elhachmi
- League: Division 3 Södra Norrland
- Website: http://www.laget.se/satersif/
Home colours	Away colours

Säters IF FK is a Swedish football club located in Säter, Dalarnas län. The club is affiliated with Dalarnas Fotbollförbund and they play their home matches at the Säters IP in Säter.

== Background ==
Säters IF FK currently plays in Division 3 Södra Norrland, which is the fifth tier of Swedish football.

Säters IF have competed in the Svenska Cupen on 24 occasions and have played 58 matches in the competition. In the 2006 Svenska Cupen they lost 0–4 to IK Sirius in the first round.

== Season to season ==
Season	Level	Division	Section	Position	Movements
1993	Tier 5	Division 4	Dalarna	7th	
1994	Tier 5	Division 4	Dalarna	8th	
1995	Tier 5	Division 4	Dalarna	1st	Promoted
1996	Tier 4	Division 3	Södra Norrland	8th	
1997	Tier 4	Division 3	Södra Norrland	4th	
1998	Tier 4	Division 3	Södra Norrland	7th	
1999	Tier 4	Division 3	Södra Norrland	11th	Relegated
2000	Tier 5	Division 4	Dalarna	9th	
2001	Tier 5	Division 4	Dalarna	6th	
2002	Tier 5	Division 4	Dalarna	7th	
2003	Tier 5	Division 4	Dalarna	8th	Relegated
2004	Tier 6	Division 5	Dalarna Södra	1st	Promoted
2005	Tier 5	Division 4	Dalarna	3rd	
2006*	Tier 6	Division 4	Dalarna	2nd	Promotion Playoffs
2007	Tier 6	Division 4	Dalarna	4th	
2008	Tier 6	Division 4	Dalarna	10th	Relegated
2009	Tier 7	Division 5	Dalarna Södra	1st	Promoted
2010	Tier 6	Division 4	Dalarna	3rd	
2011	Tier 6	Division 4	Dalarna	7th	
2012	Tier 6	Division 4	Dalarna	12th	Relegated
2013	Tier 7	Division 5	Dalarna	5th	
2014	Tier 7	Division 5	Dalarna	3rd	
2015	Tier 7	Division 5	Dalarna	1st	Promoted
2016	Tier 6	Division 4	Dalarna	1st	Promoted
2017	Tier 5	Division 3	Södra Norrland	5th	

* League restructuring in 2006 resulted in a new division being created at Tier 3 and subsequent divisions dropping a level.
