= Sala FF =

Swedish football club

- Full name: Sala Fotbollförening
- Founded: December 1972; 52 years ago
- Ground: Sportfältsgatan, Sala
- Chairman: Mattias Falk
- Manager: Jens Eriksson
- League: Division 3 Norra Svealand
- 2020: Division 3 Södra Norrland
- Website: https://www.laget.se/SALAFF/
Home colours	Away colours

Sala Fotbollförening is a Swedish professional football club based in Sala, Västmanland County. Founded in 1972, they play in the 12-team Division 3 Norra Svealand in Sweden's fifth tier. They play their home games on public pitches at Sportfältsgatan. Their former home was Silvervallen.

The club has 18 teams across men's senior, men's junior and women's categories.

Sala FF is affiliated with Västmanlands Fotbollförbund.

== History ==
Sala FF was formed in December 1972 after IF Norden and IFK Sala merged.

In 1983, the club won promotion to Division 3 (tier 5) for the first time, but they were relegated the following season after finishing the campaign with 14 straight defeats.

They returned to the fifth tier in 1994, under the managerial guidance of Tommy Carlsson.

They remained in the division, and in 1995 they faced Heby AIF, from the neighbouring town, for the first time in the league. Sala finished the season in fourth; Heby were seventh.

In 1996, Heby finished fifth, one place higher than Sala (then managed by Rolf Stahn).

For the 1997 season, Sala was moved to Division 3 in Södra Norrland. They were relegated under new manager Thomas Johansson.

They later dropped another level, to tier 6, before winning promotion, with manager Tony Mattsson, to the fifth tier in 2012, where they have remained to date.

=== Season history ===
- 2013 – 9th, Division 3 Södra Svealand Svealand (tier 5)
- 2014 – 2nd, Division 3 Västra Svealand (tier 5)
- 2015 – 4th, Division 3 Södra Norrland (tier 5)
- 2016 – 5th, Division 3 Södra Norrland (tier 5)
- 2017 – 6th, Division 3 Östra Svealand (tier 5)
- 2018 – 3rd, Division 3 Södra Norrland (tier 5)
- 2019 – 2nd, Division 3 Södra Norrland (tier 5)
- 2020 – TBD, Division 3 Norra Svealand (tier 5)

=== Managerial history ===
- 1973: Christer Hemlin
- 1974: Hans "Norrby-Hasse" Johansson & Hans "Strömstad" Johansson
- 1975–78: Björn Larsson
- 1979: Hans “Strömstad” Johansson
- 1980–83: Hugo Karlsson
- 1984–86: Björn Larsson
- 1987–91: Hasse Ljung
- 1992: Allan Pettersson
- 1993: Håkan Reuterwall
- 1994–95: Tommy Carlsson
- 1996: Rolf Stahn
- 1997–99: Thomas Johansson
- 2000: Lars-Inge Johansson & Micke Eriksson
- 2001: Tommy Carlsson (second term)
- 2002–04: Håkan Reuterwall
- 2005: Janne Östlund
- 2006–07: And Enström
- 2008: Stefan Thid
- 2009: Fredrik Dimberg
- 2010: Pelle Johansson
- 2011–12: Tony Mattsson
- 2013–14: Michael Andersson
- 2015–present: Jens Eriksson
