= IFK Mora Fotboll =

Swedish football club

IFK Mora FK
- Full name: Idrottsföreningen Kamraterna Mora Fotbollklubb
- Founded: 1909
- Ground: Prästholmens IP; Mora; Sweden
- Chairman: Mathias Jones
- Head coach: Goran Cuckovic
- League: Division 3 Södra Norrland
Home colours	Away colours

IFK Mora FK is a Swedish football club located in Mora.

== Background ==
IFK Mora FK currently plays in Division 2 Dalarna which is the fourth tier of Swedish football. They play their home matches at the Prästholmens IP in Mora.

The club is affiliated to Dalarnas Fotbollförbund. IFK Mora have competed in the Svenska Cupen on 23 occasions and have played 61 matches in the competition.

== Season to season ==
Season	Level	Division	Section	Position	Movements
1974	Tier 4	Division 4	Dalarna	1st	Promoted
1975	Tier 3	Division 3	Södra Norrland	7th	
1976	Tier 3	Division 3	Västra Svealand	3rd	
1977	Tier 3	Division 3	Västra Svealand	8th	
1978	Tier 3	Division 3	Västra Svealand	5th	
1979	Tier 3	Division 3	Västra Svealand	8th	
1980	Tier 3	Division 3	Västra Svealand	3rd	
1981	Tier 3	Division 3	Västra Svealand	3rd	
1982	Tier 3	Division 3	Södra Norrland	1st	Promotion Playoffs
1983	Tier 3	Division 3	Södra Norrland	2nd	
1984	Tier 3	Division 3	Södra Norrland	3rd	
1985	Tier 3	Division 3	Södra Norrland	2nd	
1986	Tier 3	Division 3	Södra Norrland	1st	Promotion Playoffs – Promoted
1987	Tier 2	Division 1	Norra	12th	
1988	Tier 2	Division 1	Norra	14th	Relegated
1989	Tier 3	Division 2	Norra	11th	
1990	Tier 3	Division 2	Norra	14th	Relegated
1991	Tier 4	Division 3	Södra Norrland	6th	
1992	Tier 4	Division 3	Södra Norrland A	2nd	Vårserier (Spring Series)
	Tier 4	Division 3	Södra Norrland	4th	Höstserier (Autumn Series)
1993	Tier 4	Division 3	Södra Norrland	4th	
1994	Tier 4	Division 3	Södra Norrland	7th	
1995	Tier 4	Division 3	Södra Norrland	8th	
1996	Tier 4	Division 3	Södra Norrland	7th	
1997	Tier 4	Division 3	Södra Norrland	6th	
1998	Tier 4	Division 3	Södra Norrland	10th	Relegated
1999	Tier 5	Division 4	Dalarna	2nd	
2000	Tier 5	Division 4	Dalarna	1st	Promoted
2001	Tier 4	Division 3	Södra Norrland	6th	
2002	Tier 4	Division 3	Södra Norrland	10th	Relegated
2003	Tier 5	Division 4	Dalarna	9th	Relegated
2004	Tier 6	Division 5	Dalarna Norra	1st	Promoted
2005	Tier 5	Division 4	Dalarna	7th	
2006**	Tier 6	Division 4	Dalarna	3rd	
2007	Tier 6	Division 4	Dalarna	6th	
2008	Tier 6	Division 4	Dalarna	12th	Relegated
2009	Tier 7	Division 5	Dalarna Norra	6th	
2010	Tier 7	Division 5	Dalarna Norra	2nd	Promoted
2011	Tier 6	Division 4	Dalarna	5th	

* League restructuring in 1987 resulted in a new division being created at Tier 2 and subsequent divisions dropping a level.
** League restructuring in 2006 resulted in a new division being created at Tier 3 and subsequent divisions dropping a level.
