= Ytterby IS =

Swedish football club

- Full name: Ytterby Idrottssällskap
- Founded: 1947
- Ground: Ytterns IP; Kungälv; Sweden
- Coach: Robert Tartagni
- League: Division 3 Nordvästra Götaland
Home colours	Away colours

Ytterby IS is a Swedish football team from Kungälv, currently playing in Division 3 Västra Götaland. The team was founded in 1947.

== Background ==
Ytterby IS men's team plays in Division 3. The club was founded by Harry Karlsson in 1947. Club facilities consists of a full-size artificial turf pitch and a number of grass pitches.

For much of the 1990s Ytterby IS played in Division 3 Nordvästra Götaland which was then the fourth tier of Swedish football. They were finally promoted at the end of the 1999 season and spent the next 5 seasons in Division 2 Västra Götaland before being relegated at the end of the 2004 season. The club then spent another 4 seasons back in Division 3 Nordvästra Götaland but in 2008 won promotion to Division 2 Västra Götaland followed by a further promotion in 2009 to Division 1 Södra.

Ytterby IS are affiliated to the Göteborgs Fotbollförbund.

== Current squad ==
Andreas Olsson

Målvakt

#2 Viktor Hallström Försvarare

#3 Kevin Carlsson Försvarare

#4 Martin Sjöberg Försvarare

#5 Adam Hurtig Mittfältare

#6 Calle Hedén Mittfältare

#7 Steffen Hjort Sörensen Forward

#8 Sebastian Strömqvist Mittfältare

#9 Mattias Thornberg Forward

#10 Marcus Andersson Försvarare

#11 Albin Granbacke Försvarare

#12 David Korneliusson Mittfältare

#13 Alex Jacobson Mittfältare

#15 Victor Andersson Mittfältare

#16 Johan Jussila Forward

#17 Oliver Hysén Försvarare

#18 Joakim Thornberg Forward

#19 Fabian Andersson Mittfältare

#20 Emil Rangaard Försvarare

#21 Tobias Sanne Mittfältare

#23 Gilbert Jochens Målvakt

#24 Malte Fridsen Mittfältare

#27 Fredrik Strand Mittfältare

Daniel Alexandersson

Felix Stengarn

Tim Stolt Hermansson

== Season to season ==
Season	Level	Division	Section	Position	Movements
1993	Tier 4	Division 3	Nordvästra Götaland	5th	
1994	Tier 4	Division 3	Nordvästra Götaland	6th	
1995	Tier 4	Division 3	Nordvästra Götaland	5th	
1996	Tier 4	Division 3	Nordvästra Götaland	3rd	
1997	Tier 4	Division 3	Nordvästra Götaland	8th	
1998	Tier 4	Division 3	Nordvästra Götaland	2nd	
1999	Tier 4	Division 3	Nordvästra Götaland	1st	Promoted
2000	Tier 3	Division 2	Västra Götaland	4th	
2001	Tier 3	Division 2	Västra Götaland	2nd	
2002	Tier 3	Division 2	Västra Götaland	8th	
2003	Tier 3	Division 2	Västra Götaland	10th	Relegation Playoffs
2004	Tier 3	Division 2	Västra Götaland	12th	Relegated
2005	Tier 4	Division 3	Nordvästra Götaland	5th	
2006*	Tier 5	Division 3	Nordvästra Götaland	4th	
2007	Tier 5	Division 3	Nordvästra Götaland	4th	
2008	Tier 5	Division 3	Nordvästra Götaland	1st	Promoted
2009	Tier 4	Division 2	Västra Götaland	1st	Promoted
2010	Tier 3	Division 1	Södra	14th	Relegated
2011	Tier 4	Division 2	Norra Götaland	7th	
2012	Tier 4	Division 2	Västra Götaland	8th	
2013	Tier 4	Division 2	Norra Götaland		

* League restructuring in 2006 resulted in a new division being created at Tier 3 and subsequent divisions dropping a level.
