= Husie IF =

Swedish football club

- Full name: Husie Idrottsförening
- Ground: Husiegård, Husie, Malmö, Sweden
- League: Division 5 Skåne Sydvästra
- 2010: Division 5 Skåne Sydvästra, 4th
Home colours	Away colours

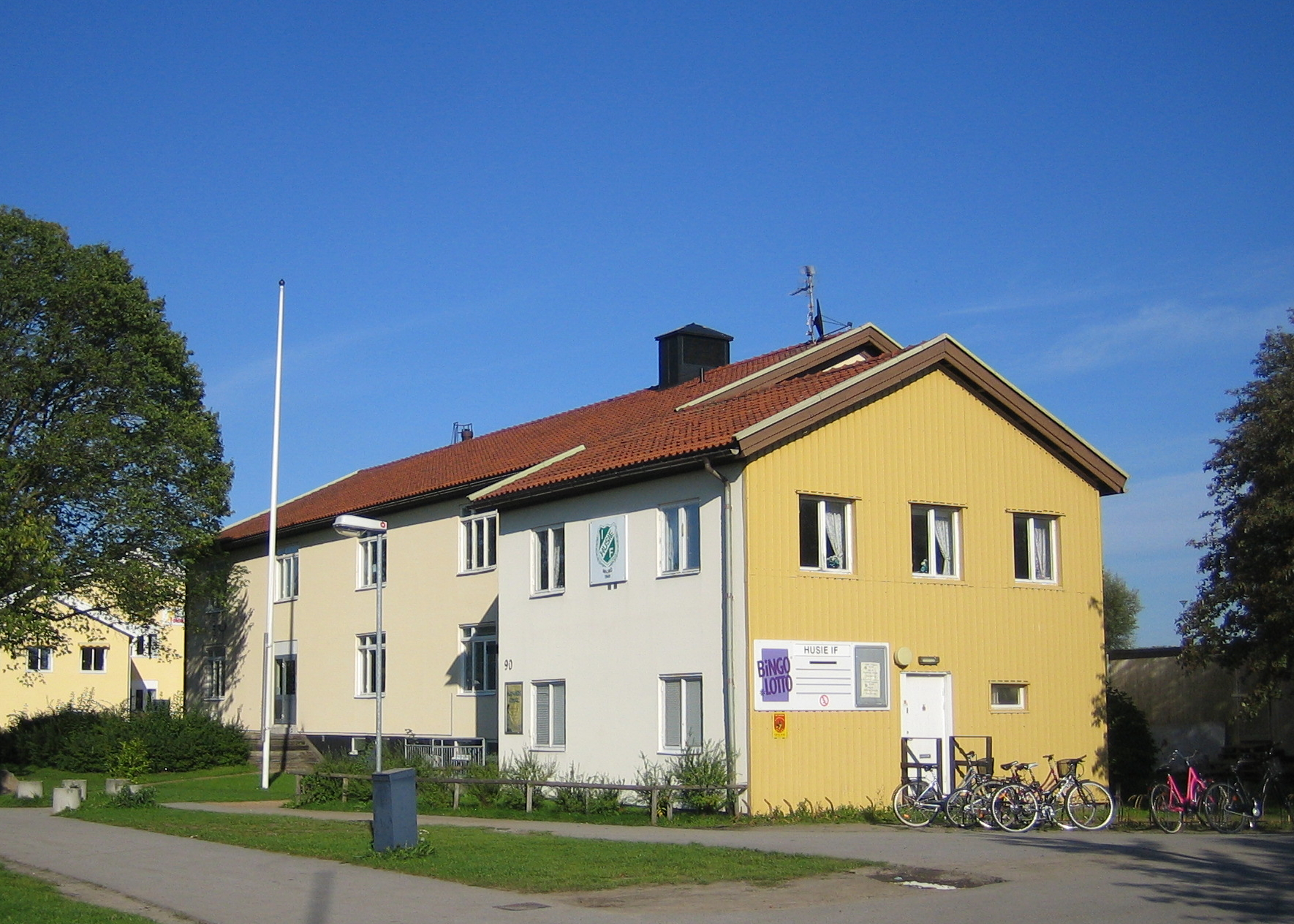
Husie IF headquarters in Kvarnby, Malmö

Husie IF is a Swedish football club located in Husie which is a residential area of Malmö. The club has several youth teams, a men's team and a women's team. The club is affiliated to Skånes Fotbollförbund.

== Season to season ==
Season	Level	Division	Section	Position	Movements
1993	Tier 4	Division 3	Södra Götaland	7th	
1994	Tier 4	Division 3	Södra Götaland	3rd	
1995	Tier 4	Division 3	Södra Götaland	3rd	
1996	Tier 4	Division 3	Södra Götaland	6th	
1997	Tier 4	Division 3	Södra Götaland	7th	
1998	Tier 4	Division 3	Södra Götaland	10th	Relegated
1999	Tier 5	Division 4	Skåne Västra	8th	
2000	Tier 5	Division 4	Skåne Södra	11th	Relegated
2001	Tier 6	Division 5	Skåne Sydvästra A	4th	
2002	Tier 6	Division 5	Skåne Sydvästra A	8th	
2003	Tier 6	Division 5	Skåne Sydvästra	4th	
2004	Tier 6	Division 5	Skåne Mellersta	3rd	Promotion playoffs
2005	Tier 6	Division 5	Skåne Sydvästra	3rd	Promotion playoffs
2006*	Tier 7	Division 5	Skåne Sydvästra	5th	
2007	Tier 7	Division 5	Skåne Mellersta	6th	
2008	Tier 7	Division 5	Skåne Sydvästra A	3rd	Promotion playoffs
2009	Tier 7	Division 5	Skåne Sydvästra	3rd	Promotion playoffs
2010	Tier 7	Division 5	Skåne Sydvästra	4th	
2011	Tier 7	Division 5	Skåne Sydvästra		

* League restructuring in 2006 resulted in a new division being created at Tier 3 and subsequent divisions dropping a level.
