= Adolfsbergs IK =

Swedish football club

- Full name: Adolfsbergs Idrottsklubb
- Founded: 1943
- Ground: Lugnets IP; Örebro; Sweden
- Chairman: Per Wiklund
- League: Division 3 Västra Svealand
- 2009: Division 3 Västra Svealand, 9th
Home colours	Away colours

Adolfsbergs IK is a Swedish football club located in Örebro in Örebro County.

== Background ==
Adolfsbergs Idrottsklubb is a sports club from the district of Adolfsberg in Örebro. The club was founded on 8 November 1943 and was first involved in bandy and table tennis. From 1944 football was played at the Brunnsparken and since 1957 at the Lugnets IP in Sommarroskogen where there is also a clubhouse.

Since 1975 the club has only specialised in football. Adolfsbergs IK currently has 450 active players and around 20 teams. Along with BK Forward and Karlslunds IF HFK, Adolfsbergs IK arranges one of Sweden's largest youth tournaments, the Örebro Cup.

Since their foundation Adolfsbergs IK has participated mainly in the middle and lower divisions of the Swedish football league system. In 2010 the club played in Division 3 Västra Svealand, which is the fifth tier of Swedish football, but they finished in a relegation position and in 2011 they will play in Division 4 Örebro Län. They play their home matches at the Lugnets IP in Örebro.

Adolfsbergs IK are affiliated to the Örebro Läns Fotbollförbund.

== Season to season ==
Season	Level	Division	Section	Position	Movements
1993	Tier 4	Division 3	Västra Svealand	10th	Relegated
1994	Tier 5	Division 4	Örebro Län	1st	Promoted
1995	Tier 4	Division 3	Västra Svealand	3rd	
1996	Tier 4	Division 3	Västra Svealand	5th	
1997	Tier 4	Division 3	Västra Svealand	10th	Relegated
1998	Tier 5	Division 4	Örebro Län	3rd	
1999	Tier 5	Division 4	Örebro Län	2nd	
2000	Tier 5	Division 4	Örebro Län	2nd	Promotion Playoffs
2001	Tier 5	Division 4	Örebro Län	7th	
2002	Tier 5	Division 4	Örebro Län	1st	Promoted
2003	Tier 4	Division 3	Västra Svealand	10th	Relegated
2004	Tier 5	Division 4	Örebro Län	2nd	Promotion Playoffs
2005	Tier 5	Division 4	Örebro Län	6th	
2006*	Tier 6	Division 4	Örebro Län	2nd	Promotion Playoffs – Promoted
2007	Tier 5	Division 3	Västra Svealand	5th	
2008	Tier 5	Division 3	Västra Svealand	9th	
2009	Tier 5	Division 3	Västra Svealand	9th	
2010	Tier 5	Division 3	Västra Svealand	12th	Relegated
2011	Tier 6	Division 4	Örebro Län	5th	
2012	Tier 6	Division 4	Örebro län	1st	Promoted
2013	Tier 5	Division 3	Västra Svealand	12th	Relegated
2014	Tier 6	Division 4	Örebro län	7th	

* League restructuring in 2006 resulted in a new division being created at Tier 3 and subsequent divisions dropping a level.

== Attendances ==
In recent seasons Adolfsbergs IK have had the following average attendances:

Season	Average attendance	Division / Section	Level
2006	Not available	Div 4 Örebro Län	Tier 6
2007	148	Div 3 Västra Svealand	Tier 5
2008	175	Div 3 Västra Svealand	Tier 5
2009	189	Div 3 Västra Svealand	Tier 5
2010	149	Div 3 Västra Svealand	Tier 5

* Attendances are provided in the Publikliga sections of the Svenska Fotbollförbundet website.
