= BK Zeros =

Swedish football club

- Full name: Bollklubben Zeros
- Founded: 1932
- Ground: Z-parken; Motala; Sweden
- League: Division 6 Östergötland Västra
- 2012: Division 5 Östergötland Västra, 12th (relegated)
Home colours

BK Zeros is a Swedish football club located in Motala.

== Background ==
BK Zeros currently play in Division 6 Östergötland Västra which is the eighth tier of Swedish football. They play their home matches at the Z-parken in Motala.

BK Zeros are affiliated to Östergötlands Fotbollförbund.

== Season to season ==
In their most successful period BK Zeros competed in the following divisions:

Season	Level	Division	Section	Position	Movements
1942–43	Tier 3	Division 3	Mellansvenska Norra	8th	
1943–44	Tier 3	Division 3	Mellansvenska Norra	4th	
1944–45	Tier 3	Division 3	Mellansvenska Norra	10th	Relegated

In recent seasons BK Zeros have competed in the following divisions:

Season	Level	Division	Section	Position	Movements
1993	Tier 4	Division 3	Nordöstra Götaland	11th	Relegated
1994	Tier 5	Division 4	Östergötland Västra	1st	Promoted
1995	Tier 4	Division 3	Nordöstra Götaland	9th	Relegation Playoffs – Relegated
1996	Tier 5	Division 4	Östergötland Västra	1st	Promoted
1997	Tier 4	Division 3	Nordöstra Götaland	6th	
1998	Tier 4	Division 3	Nordöstra Götaland	3rd	
1999	Tier 4	Division 3	Nordöstra Götaland	2nd	
2000	Tier 4	Division 3	Nordöstra Götaland	9th	Relegation Playoffs – Relegated
2001	Tier 5	Division 4	Östergötland Västra	1st	Promoted
2002	Tier 4	Division 3	Nordöstra Götaland	12th	Relegated
2003	Tier 5	Division 4	Östergötland Västra	1st	Promoted
2004	Tier 4	Division 3	Nordöstra Götaland	9th	Relegation Playoffs – Relegated
2005	Tier 5	Division 4	Östergötland Västra	1st	Promoted
2006*	Tier 5	Division 3	Nordöstra Götaland	11th	Relegated
2007	Tier 6	Division 4	Östergötland Västra	4th	
2008	Tier 6	Division 4	Östergötland Västra	9th	
2009	Tier 6	Division 4	Östergötland Västra	10th	
2010	Tier 6	Division 4	Östergötland Västra	9th	
2011	Tier 6	Division 4	Östergötland Västra		Relegated

* League restructuring in 2006 resulted in a new division being created at Tier 3 and subsequent divisions dropping a level.
