= Ramlösa Södra FF =

Swedish football club

- Full name: Ramlösa Södra Fotbollförening
- Founded: 2007
- Ground: Heden IP and Ättekulla IP; Helsingborg; Sweden
- Capacity: 1,000 – Ättekulla
- Chairman: Ulf Andersson
- Head coach: Lino Boriero
- Coach: Magnus Högberg
- League: Division 6 Nordvästra Skåne
- 2012: Division 2 Södra Götaland, 9th
- Website: http://www.ramlosasodra.se
Home colours	Away colours

Ramlösa Södra FF is a Swedish football club from Helsingborg. On 2 March 2013 the club changed name from Ramlösa FF to Ramlösa Södra FF.

== Background ==
The club was founded on 24 November 2007 following the merger of the Helsingborgs Södra BIS and Ramlösa BoIS clubs. Before the merger Helsingborg Södra played football in Division 2 Södra Götaland and Ramlösa BoIS in Division 6. Following the merger the club runs two teams – one that plays in Division 2 under the name Ramlösa Södra FF and the other which plays in Division 6 under the name Ramlösa FF. Helsingborg Södra used to play in red and Ramlösa BoIS in blue, so it is logical that new club colours were chosen as red and blue stripes.

Since their foundation Ramlösa Södra FF has participated in the middle divisions of the Swedish football league system. The club currently plays in Division 2 Västra Götaland which is the fourth tier of Swedish football. Ramlösa Södra FF play their home games at Heden IP in Helsingborg while Ramlösa FF play their home games at Ättekulla IP.

Ramlösa Södra FF were affiliated to the Skånes Fotbollförbund.

== Season to season ==
Season	Level	Division	Section	Position	Movements
2008	Tier 4	Division 2	Södra Götaland	2nd	
2009	Tier 4	Division 2	Västra Götaland	2nd	
2010	Tier 4	Division 2	Södra Götaland	8th	
2011	Tier 4	Division 2	Södra Götaland	2nd	
2012	Tier 4	Division 2	Södra Götaland	9th	

* League restructuring in 2006 resulted in a new division being created at Tier 3 and subsequent divisions dropping a level.
