= Gislaveds IS =

Association football club in Sweden

- Full name: Gislaveds Idrottssällskap
- Founded: 1903; 122 years ago
- Ground: Ryttarvallen; Gislaved; Sweden
- Chairman: Anders Holmqvist
- League: Division 2 Västra Götaland
- 2010: Division 3 Sydvästra Götaland, 1st (Promoted)
Home colours	Away colours

Gislaveds IS is a Swedish football club located in Gislaved in Jönköping County.

== Background ==
Gislaveds Idrottssällskap was formed in Gislaved as a sports club in 1903. The club has mainly been successful in football and currently has men's and ladies sides supported by one of Småland's largest youth sections.

Since their foundation Gislaveds IS has participated mainly in the middle divisions of the Swedish football league system. The club currently plays in Division 2 Västra Svealand which is the fourth tier of Swedish football. They play their home matches at the Ryttarvallen in Gislaved. The complex has 5 full size pitches and an indoor hall with a 70 metres by 40 metres artificial grass pitch.

Gislaveds IS are affiliated to the Smålands Fotbollförbund.

== Season to season ==
Season	Level	Division	Section	Position	Movements
1993	Tier 4	Division 3	Sydvästra Götaland	8th	
1994	Tier 4	Division 3	Sydvästra Götaland	8th	
1995	Tier 4	Division 3	Mellersta Götaland	7th	
1996	Tier 4	Division 3	Mellersta Götaland	3rd	
1997	Tier 4	Division 3	Sydvästra Götaland	7th	
1998	Tier 4	Division 3	Sydvästra Götaland	8th	
1999	Tier 4	Division 3	Sydvästra Götaland	9th	Relegated
2000	Tier 5	Division 4	Småland Nordvästra	11th	
2001	Tier 5	Division 4	Småland Nordvästra	5th	
2002	Tier 5	Division 4	Småland Nordvästra	2nd	
2003	Tier 5	Division 4	Småland Nordvästra	4th	
2004	Tier 5	Division 4	Småland Nordvästra	2nd	Promotion Playoffs to Elit
2005	Tier 5	Division 4	Småland Sydvästra	4th	
2006*	Tier 6	Division 4	Småland Nordvästra	4th	
2007	Tier 6	Division 4	Småland Nordvästra	1st	Promoted to Elit
2008	Tier 6	Division 4	Småland Elit Västra	3rd	Promotion Playoffs – Promoted
2009	Tier 5	Division 3	Mellersta Götaland	5th	
2010	Tier 5	Division 3	Sydvästra Götaland	1st	Promoted
2011	Tier 4	Division 2	Västra Götaland	12th	Relegated

* League restructuring in 2006 resulted in a new division being created at Tier 3 and subsequent divisions dropping a level.

== Attendances ==
In recent seasons Gislaveds IS have had the following average attendances:

Season	Average attendance	Division / Section	Level
2008	Not available	Div 4 Småland Elit Västra	Tier 6
2009	218	Div 3 Mellersta Götaland	Tier 5
2010	210	Div 3 Sydvästra Götaland	Tier 5

* Attendances are provided in the Publikliga sections of the Svenska Fotbollförbundet website.

The club's attendance record is around 1500 spectators and was for a match against FK Jat who were defeated 5–0. The spectators consisted of more than 800 paying customers and around 700 children under 16 with free admission.
