= Arboga Södra IF =

Swedish football club

- Full name: Arboga Södra Idrottsföreningen
- Nickname: ASIF
- Founded: 1933
- Ground: Ekbackens IP; Arboga; Sweden
- Chairman: Clas-Ove Bergman
- League: Division 3 Västra Svealand
- 2010: Division 4 Västmanland, 1st (Promoted)
Home colours

Arboga Södra IF is a Swedish football club located in Arboga in Västmanland County.

== Background ==
Arboga Södra Idrottsföreningen were formed in May 1933 by sports enthusiasts in Södra Skogen in Arboga. A major project undertaken was the development of Ekbacken IP in 1967 and the restoration of the "Södragården" as a clubhouse. The municipality donated the building and construction materials to the club who themselves undertook the extensive renovation of the dilapidated building. The changing pavilion was built in 1975–76 and later extended with two dressing rooms, a meeting room and a kiosk.

Since their foundation Arboga Södra IF has participated mainly in the middle and lower divisions of the Swedish football league system. The club currently plays in Division 3 Västra Svealand which is the fifth tier of Swedish football. They play their home matches at the Ekbackens IP in Arboga.

Arboga Södra IF are affiliated to Västmanlands Fotbollförbund.

== Recent history ==
In recent seasons Arboga Södra IF have competed in the following divisions:

2011 – Division III, Västra Svealand
2010 – Division IV, Västmanland
2009 – Division III, Västra Svealand
2008 – Division III, Västra Svealand
2007 – Division IV, Västmanland
2006 – Division IV, Västmanland
2005 – Division IV, Västmanland
2004 – Division IV, Västmanland
2003 – Division IV, Västmanland
2002 – Division IV, Västmanland
2001 – Division III, Västra Svealand
2000 – Division III, Västra Svealand
1999 – Division III, Västra Svealand
1998 – Division III, Västra Svealand
1997 – Division III, Västra Svealand
1996 – Division III, Västra Svealand
1995 – Division II, Västra Svealand
1994 – Division III, Västra Svealand
1993 – Division II, Västra Svealand

== Attendances ==
In recent seasons Arboga Södra IF have had the following average attendances:

Season	Average attendance	Division / Section	Level
2007	Not available	Div 4 Västmanland	Tier 6
2008	253	Div 3 Västra Svealand	Tier 5
2009	209	Div 3 Västra Svealand	Tier 5
2010	232	Div 4 Västmanland	Tier 6

* Attendances are provided in the Publikliga sections of the Svenska Fotbollförbundet website.
