= FBK Karlstad =

Swedish football club

- Full name: Fotbollsklubben Karlstad
- Short name: FBK
- Founded: 1971
- Ground: Örsholmen IP; Karlstad; Sweden
- Chairman: Bjarne Andersson
- League: Ettan Norra
- 2024: Ettan Norra, 13th of 16 (relegated)
- Website: https://www.fbkfotboll.com/
Home colours	Away colours

FBK Karlstad is a Swedish football club located in Karlstad in Värmland County.

== Background ==
Fotbollsklubben Karlstad was founded in 1971. The club has a large youth section which runs many teams. Among the youngsters that have been developed by the club are Sebastian Karlsson who now plays in Degerfors IF and Per Frick who is currently with IF Elfsborg.

Since their foundation FBK Karlstad has participated mainly in the middle and lower divisions of the Swedish football league system. The club currently plays in Division 3 Västra Svealand which is the fifth tier of Swedish football. In 2009 the club were close to gaining promotion to Division 2 but lost their final match and finished in third place one position behind local rivals Karlstad BK who gained promotion via the play-offs. FBK play their home matches at the Örsholmen IP in Karlstad.

FBK Karlstad are affiliated to the Värmlands Fotbollförbund.

== Season to season ==
Season	Level	Division	Section	Position	Movements
1993	Tier 5	Division 4	Värmland	5th	
1994	Tier 5	Division 4	Värmland	1st	Promoted
1995	Tier 4	Division 3	Västra Svealand	7th	
1996	Tier 4	Division 3	Västra Svealand	2nd	Promotion Playoffs
1997	Tier 4	Division 3	Västra Svealand	4th	
1998	Tier 4	Division 3	Västra Svealand	1st	Promoted
1999	Tier 3	Division 2	Västra Svealand	11th	Relegated
2000	Tier 6	Division 5	Värmland Östra	12th	Relegated
2001	Tier 7	Division 6	Värmland Västra	2nd	Promotion Playoffs – Promoted
2002	Tier 6	Division 5	Värmland Östra	1st	Promoted
2003	Tier 5	Division 4	Värmland	6th	
2004	Tier 5	Division 4	Värmland	3rd	
2005	Tier 5	Division 4	Värmland	3rd	
2006*	Tier 6	Division 4	Värmland	1st	Promoted
2007	Tier 5	Division 3	Västra Svealand	4th	
2008	Tier 5	Division 3	Västra Svealand	8th	
2009	Tier 5	Division 3	Västra Svealand	3rd	
2010	Tier 5	Division 3	Västra Svealand	6th	
2011	Tier 5	Division 3	Västra Svealand	6th	
2012	Tier 5	Division 3	Västra Svealand	10th	Relegated
2013	Tier 6	Division 4	Värmland	5th	
2014	Tier 6	Division 4	Värmland	1st	Promoted
2015	Tier 5	Division 3	Västra Svealand	1st	Promoted
2016	Tier 4	Division 2			

* League restructuring in 2006 resulted in a new division being created at Tier 3 and subsequent divisions dropping a level.

== Attendances ==
In recent seasons FBK Karlstad have had the following average attendances:

Season	Average attendance	Division / Section	Level
2006	Not available	Div 4 Värmland	Tier 6
2007	181	Div 3 Västra Svealand	Tier 5
2008	211	Div 3 Västra Svealand	Tier 5
2009	219	Div 3 Västra Svealand	Tier 5
2010	126	Div 3 Västra Svealand	Tier 5

* Attendances are provided in the Publikliga sections of the Svenska Fotbollförbundet website.

== Current squad ==
As of 5 September 2026

Note: Flags indicate national team as defined under FIFA eligibility rules; some limited exceptions apply. Players may hold more than one non-FIFA nationality.

No.	Pos.	Nation	Player
1	GK	SWE	Nils Heinrici Gustafsson
3	DF	SWE	Anton Pärleholt
4	DF	SWE	Linus Fredriksson
5	DF	SWE	Robin Svernfors
6	DF	SWE	Christian Mariqliano
7	FW	SWE	Mohammed Qassem
8	MF	NGR	Michael Oluwayemi (on loan from Östersund)
9	MF	SWE	Filip Johansson Bahar
10	MF	SWE	Adam Bertilsson
11	MF	SWE	Renan Correa Faustini
12	FW	NOR	Albert Leer Sandstad (on loan from Kongsvinger)
13	DF	NOR	Jan Marius Høiby
14	FW	SWE	Benjamin Buisson

No.	Pos.	Nation	Player
15	MF	SYR	Wessam Dukhan
17	MF	SWE	William Olsson
18	DF	SWE	Eric Forsberg
19	GK	SWE	Nils Rolandsson
20	GK	SWE	Vincent Johansson
21	FW	ARM	Edgar Navassardian (on loan from Östersund)
22	MF	SWE	Vincent Tigerholm
23	FW	SWE	Alvin Röstlund
24	FW	SWE	Vidar Hagen
25	DF	SWE	Alexander Hedén Lindskog (on loan from Degerfors)
26	DF	SWE	Alexander Hagelberg
38	FW	SWE	Ludvig Sten
—	MF	SWE	Martin Höglund
