= Hedens IF =

Swedish football club

- Full name: Hedens Idrottsförening
- Founded: 1928
- Ground: Olympia, Heden
- League: Division 3 Norra Norrland
Home colours

Hedens IF is a Swedish football club located in Heden, Boden Municipality.

== Background ==
Hedens IF currently plays in Division 3 Norra Norrland, after the promotion from Division 4 Norrbotten Norra in 2011, which is the fifth tier of Swedish football. They play their home matches at the Olympia, Heden in Boden.

The club is affiliated to Norrbottens Fotbollförbund.

== Season to season ==
Season	Level	Division	Section	Position	Movements
1993	Tier 5	Division 4	Norrbotten Södra	2nd	
1994	Tier 5	Division 4	Norrbotten Södra	1st	Promotion Playoffs – Promoted
1995	Tier 4	Division 3	Norra Norrland	6th	
1996	Tier 4	Division 3	Norra Norrland	5th	
1997	Tier 4	Division 3	Norra Norrland	3rd	
1998	Tier 4	Division 3	Norra Norrland	7th	
1999	Tier 4	Division 3	Norra Norrland	8th	
2000	Tier 4	Division 3	Norra Norrland	2nd	Promotion Playoffs
2001	Tier 4	Division 3	Norra Norrland	11th	Relegated
2002	Tier 5	Division 4	Norrbotten Södra	3rd	
2003	Tier 5	Division 4	Norrbotten Södra	5th	
2004	Tier 5	Division 4	Norrbotten Södra	1st	Promotion Playoffs – Promoted
2005	Tier 4	Division 3	Norra Norrland	12th	Relegated
2006*	Tier 6	Division 4	Norrbotten Södra	7th	
2007	Tier 6	Division 4	Norrbotten Södra	7th	
2008	Tier 6	Division 4	Norrbotten Södra	2nd	
2009	Tier 6	Division 4	Norrbotten Södra	5th	
2010	Tier 6	Division 4	Norrbotten Södra	2nd	Promotion Playoffs
2011	Tier 6	Division 4	Norrbotten Norra	1st	Promoted

* League restructuring in 2006 resulted in a new division being created at Tier 3 and subsequent divisions dropping a level.
