= Heby AIF =

Swedish football club

- Full name: Heby Allmänna Idrottsförening
- Nickname: HAIF
- Founded: 1912
- Ground: Tegelvallen; Heby; Sweden
- Chairman: Ulf Ljungberg
- Head coach: Henrik Alriksson
- Coach: Patrik Fahlström
- League: Division 3 Södra Norrland
- 2010: Division 3 Norra Svealand, 5th
Home colours

Heby AIF is a Swedish football club located in Heby in Uppsala County.

== Background ==
Heby Allmänna Idrottsförening is a sports club from Heby that was formed on 15 May 1912.

Since their foundation Heby AIF has participated mainly in the middle divisions of the Swedish football league system. The club currently plays in Division 3 Södra Norrland which is the fifth tier of Swedish football. They play their home matches at the Tegelvallen in Heby.

Heby AIF are affiliated to Upplands Fotbollförbund. In 2009, the club's Board decided to start a new club, known as Heby AIF FF, to play in the lower divisions.

Their nearest rivals are Sala FF.

== Recent history ==
In recent seasons Heby AIF have competed in the following divisions:

2011 – Division III, Södra Norrland
2010 – Division III, Norra Svealand
2009 – Division III, Norra Svealand
2008 – Division II, Norra Svealand
2007 – Division II, Norra Svealand
2006 – Division III, Södra Norrland
2005 – Division IV, Uppland
2004 – Division III, Norra Svealand
2003 – Division III, Norra Svealand
2002 – Division III, Norra Svealand
2001 – Division III, Norra Svealand
2000 – Division III, Norra Svealand
1999 – Division III, Norra Svealand
1998 – Division III, Norra Svealand
1997 – Division III, Norra Svealand
1996 – Division III, Norra Svealand
1995 – Division III, Norra Svealand
1994 – Division II, Västra Svealand
1993 – Division III, Södra Norrland

== Attendances ==
In recent seasons, Heby AIF have had the following average attendances:

Season	Average Attendance	Division / Section	Level
2001	138	Div 3 Norra Svealand	Tier 4
2002	172	Div 3 Norra Svealand	Tier 4
2003	182	Div 3 Norra Svealand	Tier 4
2004	152	Div 3 Norra Svealand	Tier 4
2005	Not available	Div 4 Uppland	Tier 5
2006	157	Div 3 Södra Norrland	Tier 5
2007	196	Div 2 Norra Svealand	Tier 4
2008	169	Div 2 Norra Svealand	Tier 4
2009	151	Div 3 Norra Svealand	Tier 5
2010	104	Div 3 Norra Svealand	Tier 5

* Attendances are provided in the Publikliga sections of the Svenska Fotbollförbundet website and European Football Statistics website.
