= Division 3 (Swedish women's football) =

Women's association football league in Sweden

Division 3 (Swedish: Division 3 i fotboll för damer) is the fifth level in the league system of Swedish women's football and comprises 26 sections with 10-12 football teams in each.

== Current sections - 2019 season ==
Ångermanland

Anundsjö IF | Arnäs IF | Bik SK | Hägglunds IoFK lag 2 | Härnösands SK | Högakusten | Långsele AIF | Molidens IK | Själevads IK lag 2

Bohuslän/Dalsland

Gilleby/Stala Orust FC | Hamburgsunds IF | H E F Valbo BK | Herrestads AIF | Kroppefjälls IF | Ljungskile SK | IK Rössö United | Stenungsunds IF | Tjörns DFF | Vallens FF

Dalarna

Avesta DFK | Dala-Järna IK | Forssa BK | Gagnefs IF | Gustafs GoIF U | IFK Hedemora FK | IFK Mora FK | Kvarnsvedens IK U | Leksands IF | Östansbo IS A

Gästrikland

Brynäs IF/FK | Hille IF | Hofors AIF | IK Huge 2 | IFK Gävle 2 | NorrHam | Stensätra IF 2 | Strömsbro IF 2 | Strömsbro IF 3 | Valbo FF | Valbo FF 2 | Åbyggeby/Ockelbo | Årsunda IF

Göteborg

Bergums IF | Göteborgs Studenters IF | Hällesåker IF | Landvetter 2003 | Lerums IS | Lindome GIF | Mossens BK | Näsets SK | Öckerö IF | Torslanda FC | Utbynäs SK | Ytterby IS

Halland

BK Astrio | Falkenbergs FF 2 | IFK Fjärås | IS Halmia 2 | Kungsbacka IF | Laholms FK | IF Norvalla 2 | Tvååker/Galtabäck | Tölö IF 2 | Åsa IF

Hälsingland

Bollnäs GIF FF | Edsbyns IF FF | Enångers IK/ Iggesund | Kilafors IF | Moheds SK | Strömsbruks IF | Stugsunds IK | IF Team Hudik 2 | Trönö IK | Wallviks IK

Jämtland-Härjedalens

Brunflo FK | Frösö IF 2 | Häggenås SK | Krokom/Dvärsätts IF 2 | Mörsils IF | Offerdals IF | Ope IF | IFK Strömsund | Svegs IK | Ås IF

Medelpad

Alby FF | Alnö IF | Heffnersklubbans BK | Lucksta IF | Matfors IF | Selånger FK U | Stöde IF | Sunds IF 2 | Sundsvalls DFF 2 | Söråkers FF | IFK Timrå | Torpshammars IF

Norrbotten

Bergnäsets AIK | Blåsmarks SK | Gammelgårdens IF | Infjärdens SK | Luleå SK/Lira BK | Munksund/ Skuthamn SK | SSK/ FC Norrsken | Trångfors IF | Älvsby IF | Öjeby IF

Örebro

Frövi IK | GSBK | IFK Kumla | Laxå IF | Lillån FK | Nora-Pershyttan BK | Rynninge IK | IK Sturehov | Öfvre Adolfsberg FC | Örebro SK Ungdom

Östergötland

Eneby BK | Lindö FF | Linghems SK | Lkpg Kenty DFF B | Lotorps IF | Mjölby AI FF | Mjölby Södra IF | Smedby AIS B | BK Tinnis | Vadstena GoIF

Skåne östra

Bjärnums GoIF | FC Hessleholm | Gärsnäs AIS | Hammenhögs IF | Hörby FF | IFK Osby | IFÖ Bromölla IF | Köpingebro IF | Sjöbo IF | Vittsjö DFK | Wä IF | Åhus IF

Skåne västra

Backarnas FF | BK Kick | BK Olympic | BK Vången | Eskilsminne DIF | Hallands Nation | Hardeberga BK | Helsingborgs DFF | IFK Trelleborg | IK Wormo | Lunds BK | Råå IF | Svalövs BK

Småland norra

Egnahems BK | Hovslätts IK | Hultsfred/Lojal | Husqvarna FF B | Hvetlanda GIF | Kristinebergs FF | Ormaryds IF | Rödsle BK | Torpa AIS | Vimmerby IF

Småland sydöstra

Emmaboda IS | IFK Kalmar B | Kalmar Södra IF | Karlskrona FF | Lindsdals IF B | IF Lörbytjejerna | Nättraby GoIF | Ronneby BK | Runsten/Möckleby IF | Rödeby FC

Småland sydvästra

Alvesta GIF | Gislaveds IS | Hovshaga AIF | Lessebo GoIF | RefteleÅs | Tingsryd United FC | IFK Värnamo B | Växjö FF | Åseda IF | FK Älmeboda/Linneryd

Södermanland

Flens IF Södra | Hällbybrunns IF | IFK Nyköping 2 | IK Tun | Nyköpings BIS | Oxelösunds IK | Slagsta United DFF | Triangelns IK 2 | DFK Värmbol | Åkers IF

Stockholm A

AIK DFF | Brommapojkarna DFF | FC Djursholm | Hässelby SK FF | IFK Viksjö | IK Frej | P 18 IK | Skå IK | Vallentuna BK Dam | Åkersberga BK

Stockholm B

Boo FF | Djurgården TFF | Huddinge IF | Nacka Dam FK | Rönninge/Salem Fotboll | Salem FF | Segeltorps IF | Stuvsta FF | Älta IF | Älvsjö AIK FF

Uppland

Fanna BK | Gamla Upsala SK 1 | Håbo FF | Lagga/ Långhundra BK | IFK Mariehamn | IK Rex | Rimbo IF | Rosersbergs IK | Upplands-Ekeby IF | Östervåla IF

Värmland

Eda IF | FK QBIK | Hertzöga BK | IF Kil | Kila/Sifhälla | Kronans FK | Norrstrands IF | Råtorps IK | Rävåsens IK | Skattkärrs IF | Villastadens IF U

Västerbotten

Burträsk FF | Clemensnäs IF | Flurkmarks IK | Kågedalens AIF | Mariehem FF | Morön City BK | Nysätra IF | Sandviks IK | Spöland Vännäs IF | Södra Ungdom FF | Sörböle FF | Umedalens IF

Västergötland norra

Falköpings DIK | Hörnebo SK | Lidköpings IF | Mariestads BoIS DFF | Sils DIF | Skoftebyns IF | Tidaholm | Trollhättans FK | Ulvåkers IF | Vedums AIS

Västergötland södra

Bergdalens IK | Byttorps IF | Holmalunds IF | HUS FF | Lödöse Nygård | Nittorps IK | Sollebrunns AIK | Tranemo IF | Ulricehamns IFK | IFK Örby

Västmanland

Arboga Södra IF | Forsby FF | IK Franke | Gideonsberg IF U1 | Götlunda IF | Norrby SK | Rytterne IS | Sala FF | Skiljebo SK | Västerås BK 30 U
