= Hälsinglands Fotbollförbund =

Association football district association in Sweden

- Abbreviation: Hälsinglands FF
- Formation: 25 March 1917
- Purpose: District Football Association
- Location(s): Box 523 (Hällåsen 606) 82627 Söderhamn Gävleborg County Sweden
- Chairman: Dan Jonsson
- Website: http://halsingland.svenskfotboll.se/

The Hälsinglands Fotbollförbund (Hälsingland Football Association) is one of the 24 district organisations of the Swedish Football Association. It administers lower tier football in Hälsingland, a historical province in Norrland.

== Background ==
Hälsinglands Fotbollförbund, commonly referred to as Hälsinglands FF, was founded on 25 March 1917 and is the governing body for football in the historical province of Hälsingland which now constitutes the northern part of Gävleborg County. Minor parts of the province are in Jämtland County and in Västernorrland County. The Association currently has 61 member clubs. Based in Söderhamn, the Association's Chairman is Dan Jonsson.

== Affiliated Members ==
The following clubs are affiliated to the Hälsinglands FF:

- Alfta GIF Fotboll
- Arbrå BK
- Bergsjö IF
- Bjuråkers GIF
- BK Vismarå
- Bogårdens IK
- Bollnäs GIF FF
- Delsbo IF
- Edsbyns IF FF
- Enångers IK
- Färila IF
- Föne IK
- Forsa IF
- Hällbo IF
- Harmångers IF
- Hassela IF
- Hennans IK
- Högs SK
- Holmsvedens AIK
- Hudiksvalls Allmänna BK
- IF Team Hudik
- IFK Bergvik
- IFK Gnarp
- Iggesunds IK
- IK Hälsingbocken
- Ilsbo SK
- Järvsö BK
- Jättendals IF
- Kårböle IF
- Kilafors IF
- Korskrogens IK
- Landafors SK
- Långheds IF
- Ljusdals IF
- Ljusne AIK FF
- Loos IF
- Marma IF
- Marma/Mohed FF
- Moheds SK
- Näsvikens IK
- Njutångers IF
- Norrala IF
- Norrbo IF
- Norrfjärns IF
- Nors AIK
- Ramsjö SK
- Rengsjö SK
- Sandarne SIF
- Skogs Förenade FK
- Söderala Allmänna IK
- Söderhamns FF
- Strands IF
- Strömsbruks IF
- Stugsunds IK
- Tallåsens IF
- Trönö IK
- Vallsta IF
- Växbo IF
- Viksjöfors IF FF
- Wallviks IK
- Ängebo IK

== League Competitions ==
Hälsinglands FF run the following League Competitions:

=== Men's Football ===
Division 4 - one section
Division 5 - one section
Division 6 - one section
Division 7 - one section

=== Women's Football ===
Division 3 - one section
Division 4 - two sections
