= Hennan (disambiguation) =

Hennan may refer to:

== Hennan (surname) ==
- Clarence William Hennan (1894–1956), an internationally recognized philatelist

== Other ==
- Hennan, a village in Ljusdal Municipality, Hälsingland, Gävleborg County, Sweden.
