= Söderhamns UIF =

Sports club in Söderhamn, Sweden

- Full name: Söderhamns ungdomsgårds idrottsförening
- Sport: table tennis
- Founded: 1960
- Based in: Söderhamn, Sweden
- Arena: Söderhamns idrottshall

Söderhamns UIF is a sports club in Söderhamn, Sweden. Established in 1960, the club won the Swedish national men's table tennis team championship in 1978, 1982, 1985, 2001 and 2010.
