= Rolfhamre och Måga =

- Location within Sweden Gävleborg Location within Sweden
- Coordinates: 61°50′10″N 16°00′00″E
- Country: Sweden
- Province: Hälsingland
- County: Gävleborg County
- Municipality: Ljusdal Municipality

Area
  - Total: 0.52 km^{2} (0.20 sq mi)

Population (31 December 2010)
  - Total: 215
  - Density: 416/km^{2} (1,080/sq mi)
- Time zone: UTC+1 (CET)
  - Summer (DST): UTC+2 (CEST)

Rolfhamre och Måga (or Måga-Rolfhamre) is a locality situated in Ljusdal Municipality, Gävleborg County, Sweden with 215 inhabitants in 2010.
