= Järvsö =

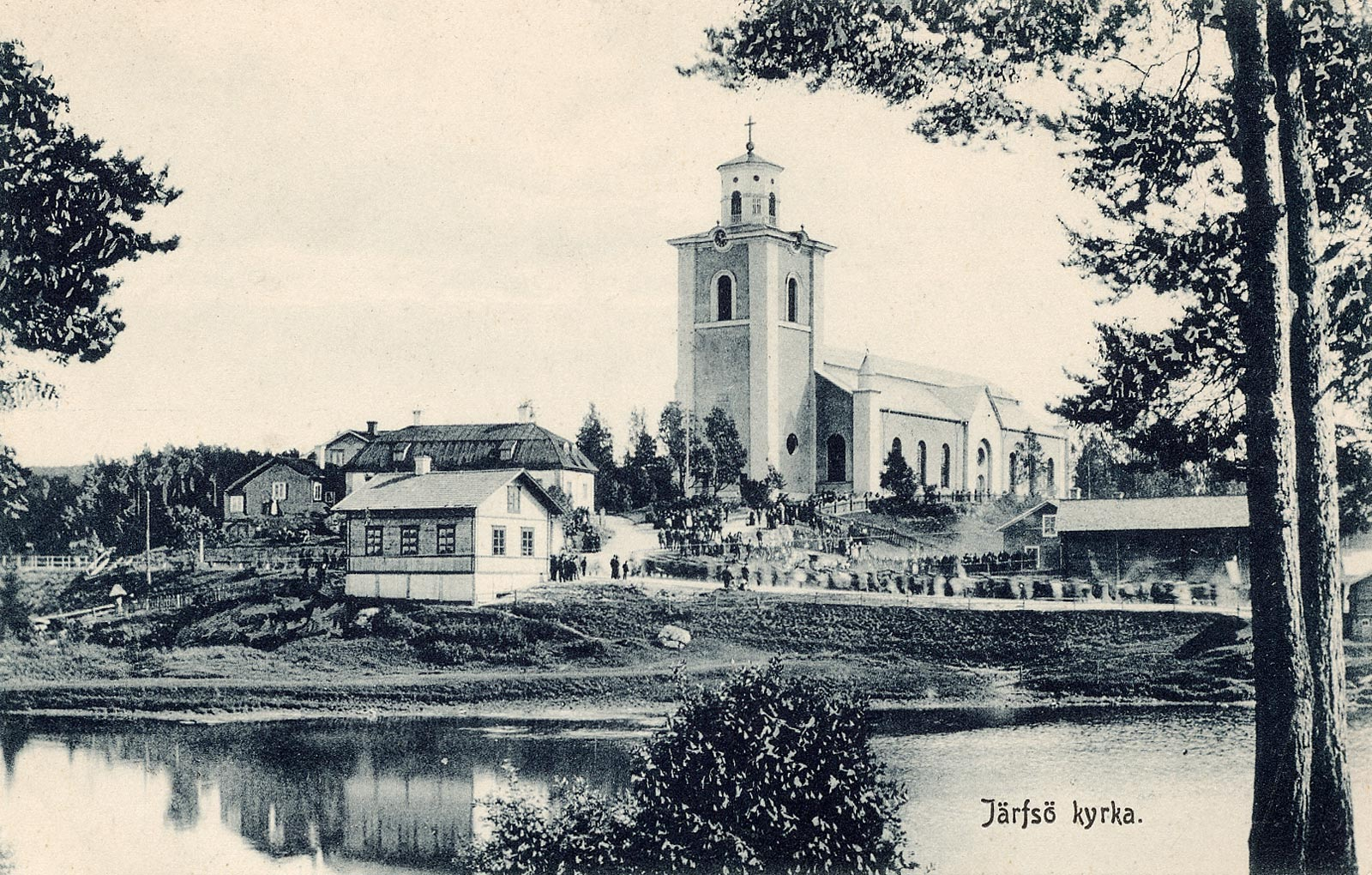
- Järvsö Church around 1910.

- Location within Sweden Gävleborg Location within Sweden
- Coordinates: 61°43′N 16°10′E
- Country: Sweden
- Province: Hälsingland
- County: Gävleborg County
- Municipality: Ljusdal Municipality

Area
  - Total: 2.13 km^{2} (0.82 sq mi)

Population (31 December 2010)
  - Total: 1,407
  - Density: 660/km^{2} (1,700/sq mi)
- Time zone: UTC+1 (CET)
  - Summer (DST): UTC+2 (CEST)

Järvsö (Swedish pronunciation: [ˈjæ̂rvsøː]), locally known as Jarse (pronounced [ˈjâʂːɛ]), is a locality and a parish situated in Ljusdal Municipality, Gävleborg County, Sweden with 1,407 inhabitants in 2010. From Järvsö, people commute to Ljusdal, Färila, Bollnäs, and Gävle. The Järv part of the town name in Swedish means "wolverine" in English.

Järvsö is a tourist town known for its ski slope, Järvsöbacken, and for its zoo, known as Järvzoo, which has an extensive collection of large Nordic animals. There are also several large hotels, including Hotell Järvsöbaden and Bergshotellet. Järvsö is also famously the hometown of the singer and actress Lill-Babs (1938-2018).

Järvsö's slogan is Alltid-Vackert-Nära. (Always Beautiful Near.).

Järvsö is home to a Division 3 hockey team, Järvsö IK.

Järvsö is certified by the EarthCheck Sustainable Destinations program.

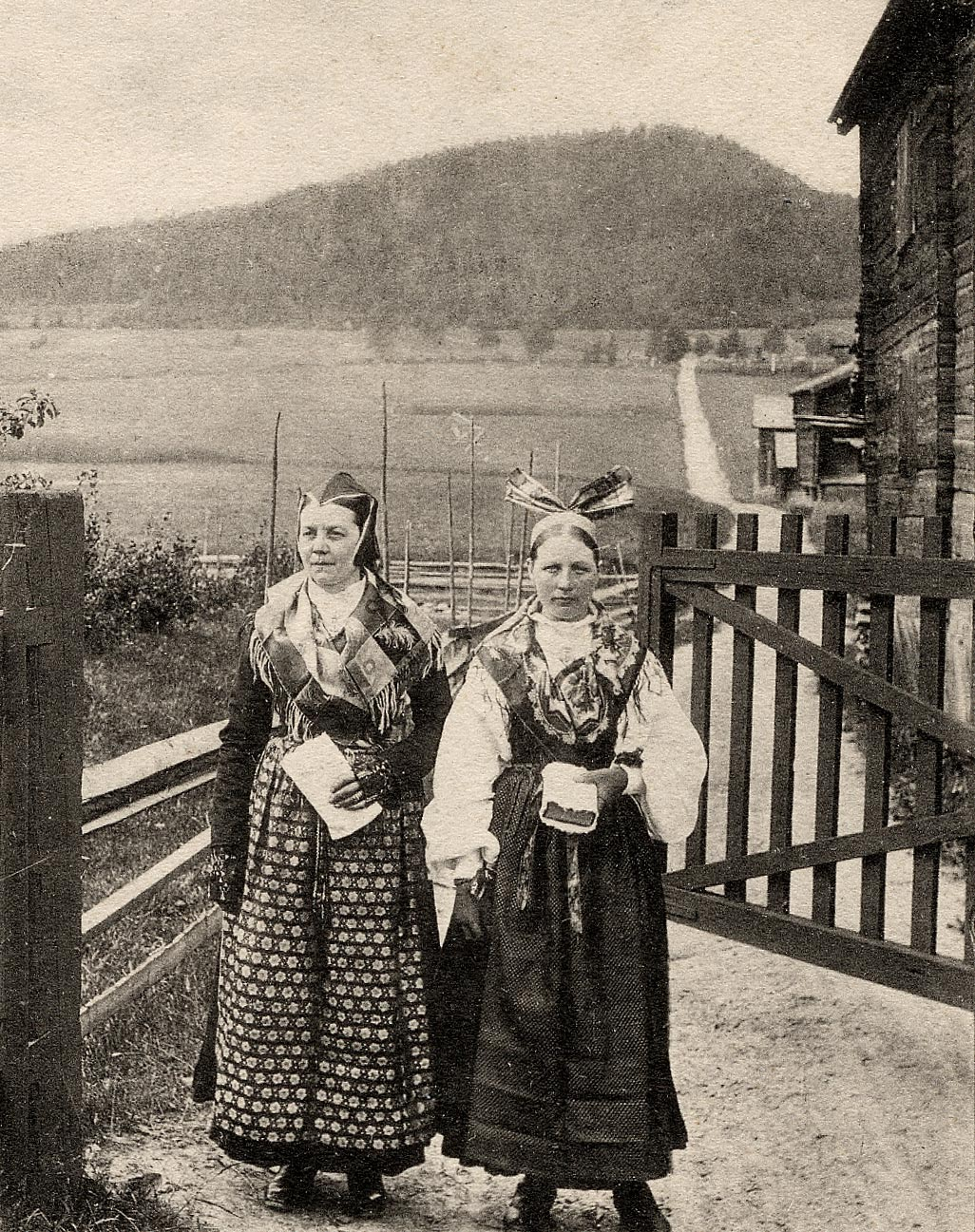
National costume from Järvsö around 1900.
