= Korskrogens IK =

Swedish sports club

- Full name: Korskrogens idrottsklubb
- Sport: soccer
- Founded: 1931
- Based in: Korskrogen, Sweden

Korskrogens IK is a sports club in Korskrogen, Sweden, established in 1931.

The women's soccer team played three seasons in the Swedish top division between 1978 and 1980.
