= Andrew Stadler =

American soccer player

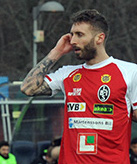
- Stadler with Landskrona BoIS in 2015

Personal information
- Full name: Andrew Michael Stadler
- Date of birth: January 5, 1988 (age 38)
- Place of birth: Wauwatosa, Wisconsin, United States
- Height: 1.79 m (5 ft 10 1/2 in)
- Positions: Forward; midfielder

Team information
- Current team: Vasalunds IF
- Number: 21

Youth career
- Polonia Youth Soccer Club

College career
Years	Team	Apps	(Gls)
2006–2009	George Washington Colonials	60	(35)

Senior career*
Years	Team	Apps	(Gls)
2011	Färila IF	5	(5)
2011–2013	Sandvikens IF	55	(16)
2014–2015	Landskrona BoIS	42	(19)
2015–2016	Östersunds FK	32	(5)
2017–2018	Dalkurd FF	31	(2)
2019	Syrianska FC	22	(5)
2020–2021	Akropolis IF	46	(2)
2022	Vasalunds IF	5	(1)
- * Club domestic league appearances and goals as of June 11, 2022

Andrew Michael Stadler (born January 5, 1988) is an American soccer player who plays as a forward for Vasalunds IF.

== Career ==
Stadler started out playing youth soccer for the local club Polonia SC which his grandfather had founded after immigrating over to America from Poland during World War II. After playing for his high school he received a scholarship to join the George Washington Colonials men's soccer college team. During his time in college Stadler scored 35 goals in 60 games and was on the watchlist for the Hermann Trophy during his senior year. After graduating he could not even find a trial with an American club and instead had to work as a concierge until a friend contacted him about the opportunity to play for Färila IF in the sixth tier of Sweden.

After only playing three games for Färila he was signed by fourth tier club Sandvikens IF where he remained for the following two and a half years. During his time with the club they played against Malmö FF in the Svenska Cupen where Stadler left a good impression on the Malmö assistant manager Jörgen Pettersson. And when Pettersson took over as manager for Superettan side Landskrona BoIS he signed Stadler to the club. At the end of his first season with Landskrona the club was relegated but the following summer he returned to Superettan when he was bought by league leaders Östersunds FK. The club was promoted to the top tier at the end of the year and in the third round of the 2016 Allsvenskan Stadler both assisted and scored for the first time in a top flight as Östersund recorded their first ever Allsvenskan victory.

Stadler left Dalkurd FF at the end of 2018, after playing for the club since March 2017. On February 3, 2019, Stadler then joined Syrianska FC.

On February 3, 2020, it was announced that Stadler had signed with Akropolis IF. As of 2022, he plays for Ettan club Vasalunds IF.

== Personal life ==
Stadler has a bachelor's degree in criminal law. He also has a brother Timothy Stadler, who received a master's degree in geophysics from Michigan State University, researching with Dr. Masako Tominaga. While attending MSU, Timothy played on the MSU men's club soccer team and lead them to numerous victories.

== Career statistics ==
As of June 11, 2022

Club	Season	Division	League		Svenska Cupen		Total	
Club	Season	Division	Apps	Goals	Apps	Goals	Apps	Goals
Färila IF	2011	Division 4	5	5	0	0	5	5
Sandvikens IF	2011	Division 2	9	4	0	0	9	4
Sandvikens IF	2012	Division 1	24	5	2	0	26	5
Sandvikens IF	2013	Division 1	22	7	1	1	23	8
Landskrona	2014	Superettan	28	13	1	0	30	13
Landskrona	2015	Division 1	14	6	3	2	17	8
Östersunds FK	2015	Superettan	11	2	0	0	11	2
Östersunds FK	2016	Allsvenskan	21	3	1	1	23	3
Dalkurd	2017	Superettan	19	2	0	0	20	2
Dalkurd	2018	Allsvenskan	12	0	4	1	12	1
Syrianska FC	2019	Superettan	22	5	0	0	22	5
Akropolis IF	2020	Superettan	21	1	3	0	24	1
Akropolis IF	2021	Superettan	25	1	3	0	25	1
Vasalunds IF	2022	Ettan	5	1	0	0	5	1
Career totals			239	46	16	5	255	60
