= Sillerboån =

Coordinates: 61.87385°N 15.99193°E

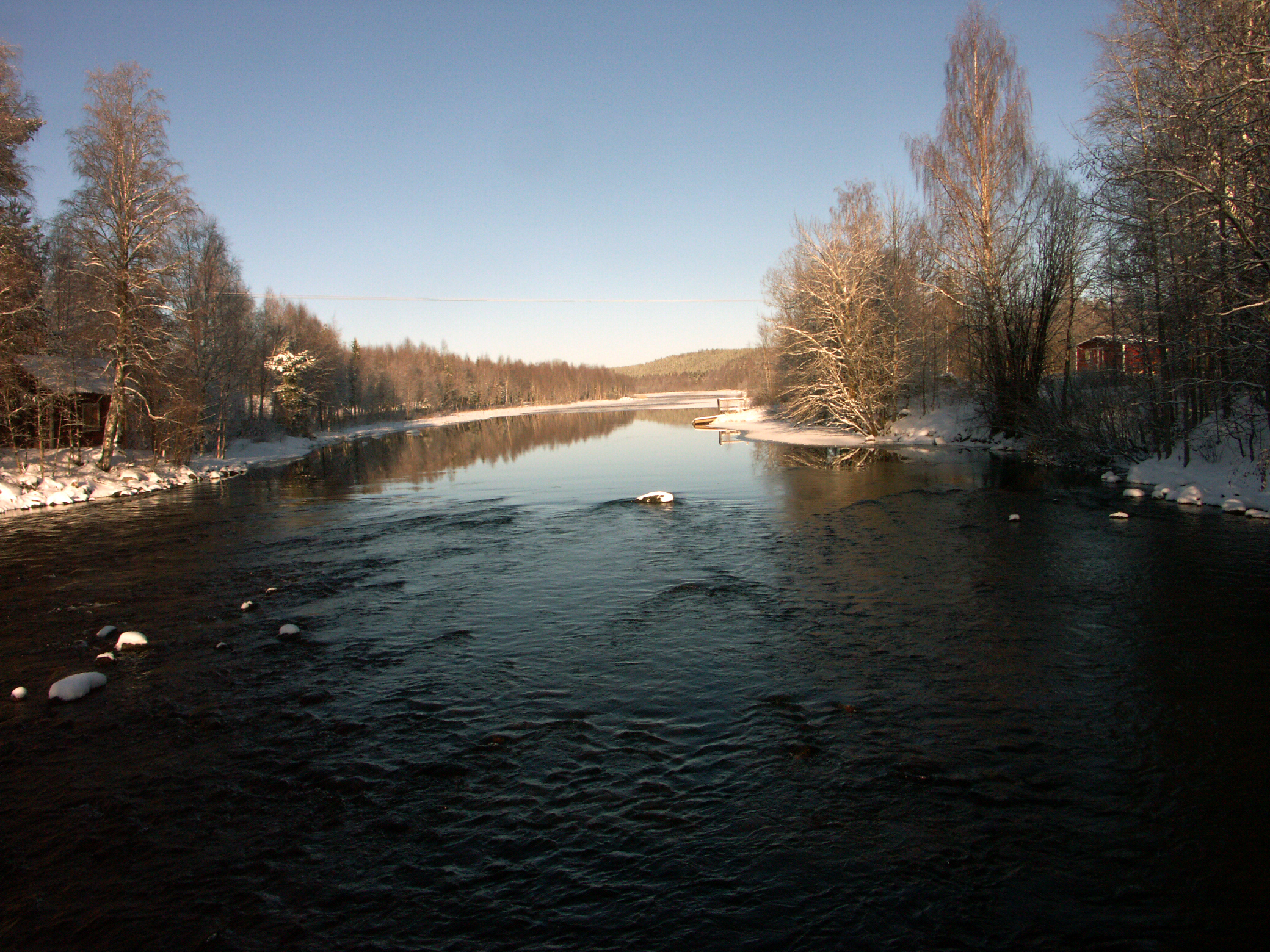
- Sillerboån from Kaffebron in Tallåsen

Location
- Country: Sweden
- County: Gävleborg County
- Municipality: Ljusdal Municipality

Physical characteristics
- Length: 80 km (50 mi)

Sillerboån is a stream in Ljusdal Municipality, Hälsingland, Gävleborgs län, Sweden that is about 80 kilometers long.
