= Stefan Lundin =

Swedish footballer and manager (born 1955)

Personal information
- Full name: Stefan Bertil Lundin
- Date of birth: 7 May 1955 (age 71)
- Place of birth: Korskrogen, Sweden
- Position: Forward

Senior career*
Years	Team	Apps	(Gls)
1968–1975	Brynäs		
1976	AIK		
1976–1978	Örebro		
1980–1981	Gefle		

Managerial career
- 1982–1983: Gefle
- 1984–1986: Halmstad
- 1986–1987: Marítimo
- 1988: Moss
- 1989–1991: Häcken
- 1992–1996: Gefle
- 1999–2002: IFK Göteborg
- 2003–2004: Örebro
- 2005–2006: Häcken
- * Club domestic league appearances and goals

Stefan Bertil Lundin (born 7 May 1955) is a Swedish former football player and manager. He became the youngest manager in the Allsvenskan in 1982 when he took over at Gefle IF aged 27.

== Career ==
As player

- Brynäs (1968–75)
- AIK (1976)
- Örebro (1976–78)
- Gefle (1980–81

As manager

- Gefle – (1982–83, 1992–96)
- Halmstad – (1984–86)
- Marítimo – (1986–87)
- Moss – (1988)
- Häcken – (1989–91), 2005–)
- IFK Göteborg – (1999–2002)
- Örebro – (2003–04)
