= Ramsjö =

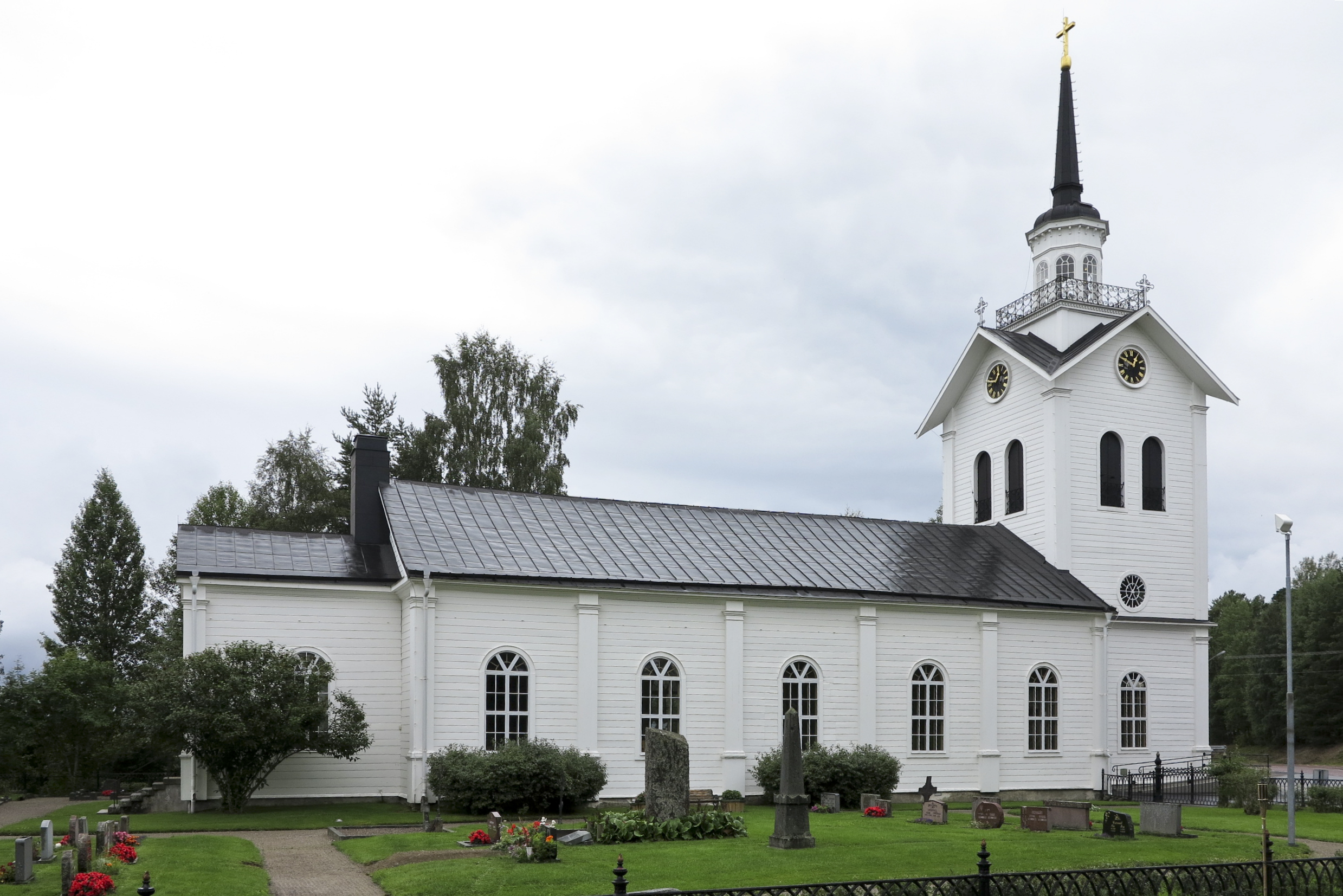

- Location within Sweden
- Coordinates: 62°11′00″N 15°39′00″E

Ramsjö (Swedish pronunciation: [ˈrâmːɧøː]) is a village in Ljusdal Municipality, Hälsingland, Gävleborg County, Sweden with about 306 inhabitants. (2004, Statistics Sweden).
