= Hamra National Park =

National park in Ljusdal Municipality, Gävleborg County, Sweden

- Hamra nationalpark
- IUCN category II (national park)
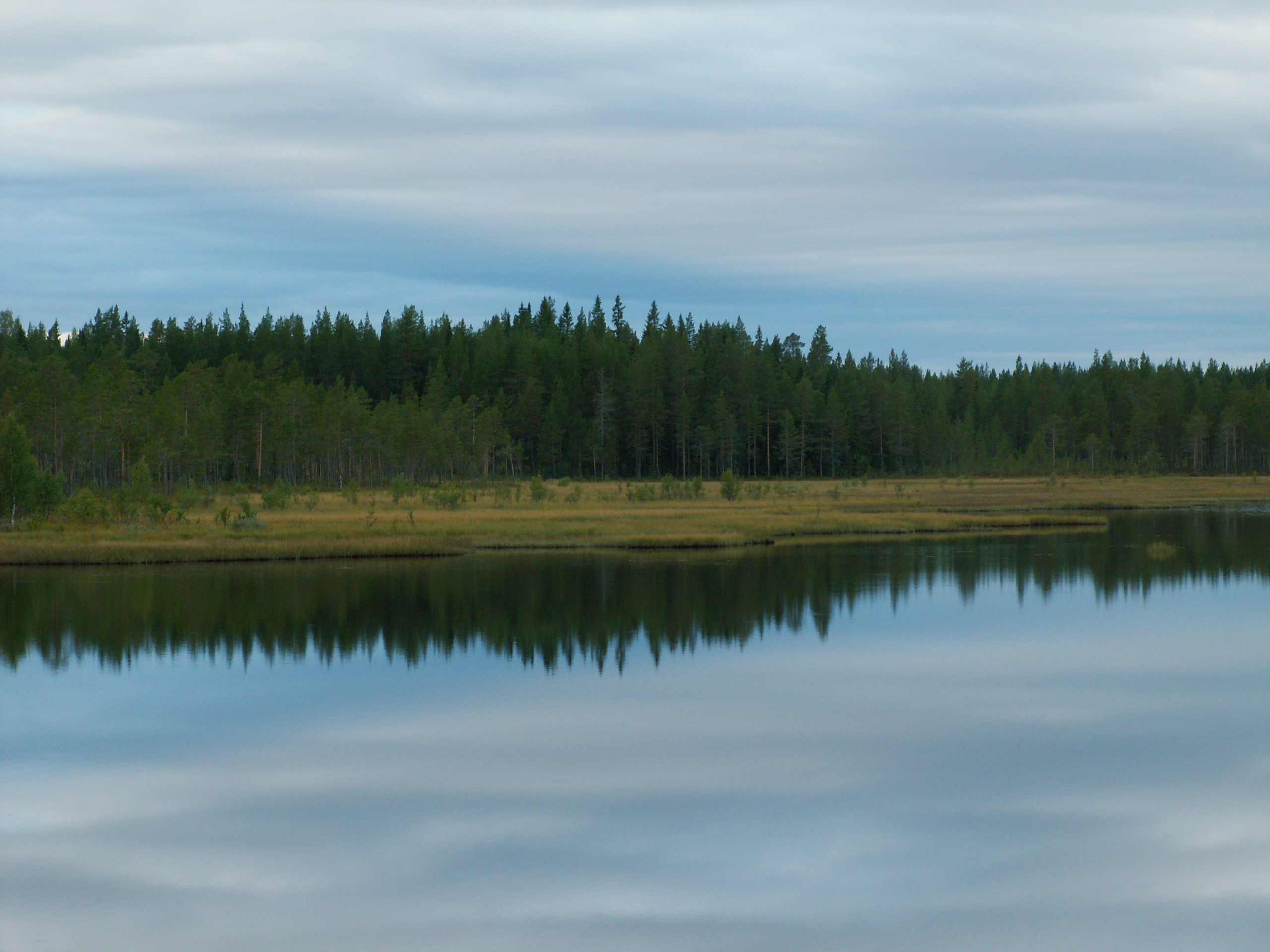
- Hamra National Park
- Interactive map of Hamra National Park
- Location: Gävleborg County, Sweden
- Nearest city: Ljusdal, Ljusdal Municipality
- Coordinates: 61°46′N 14°45′E
- Area: 13.83 km^{2} (5.34 sq mi)
- Established: 1909
- Governing body: Naturvårdsverket

Hamra National Park (Swedish: Hamra nationalpark) is a national park in Ljusdal Municipality, Gävleborg County, Sweden. The park, which is a part of Orsa Finnmark (part of Dalarna), was founded in 1909 and was then 28 ha (69 acres) in area, but was extended in 2011 to 1,383 ha (3,420 acres).

National parks of Sweden (clickable map)
