= Ilsbo =

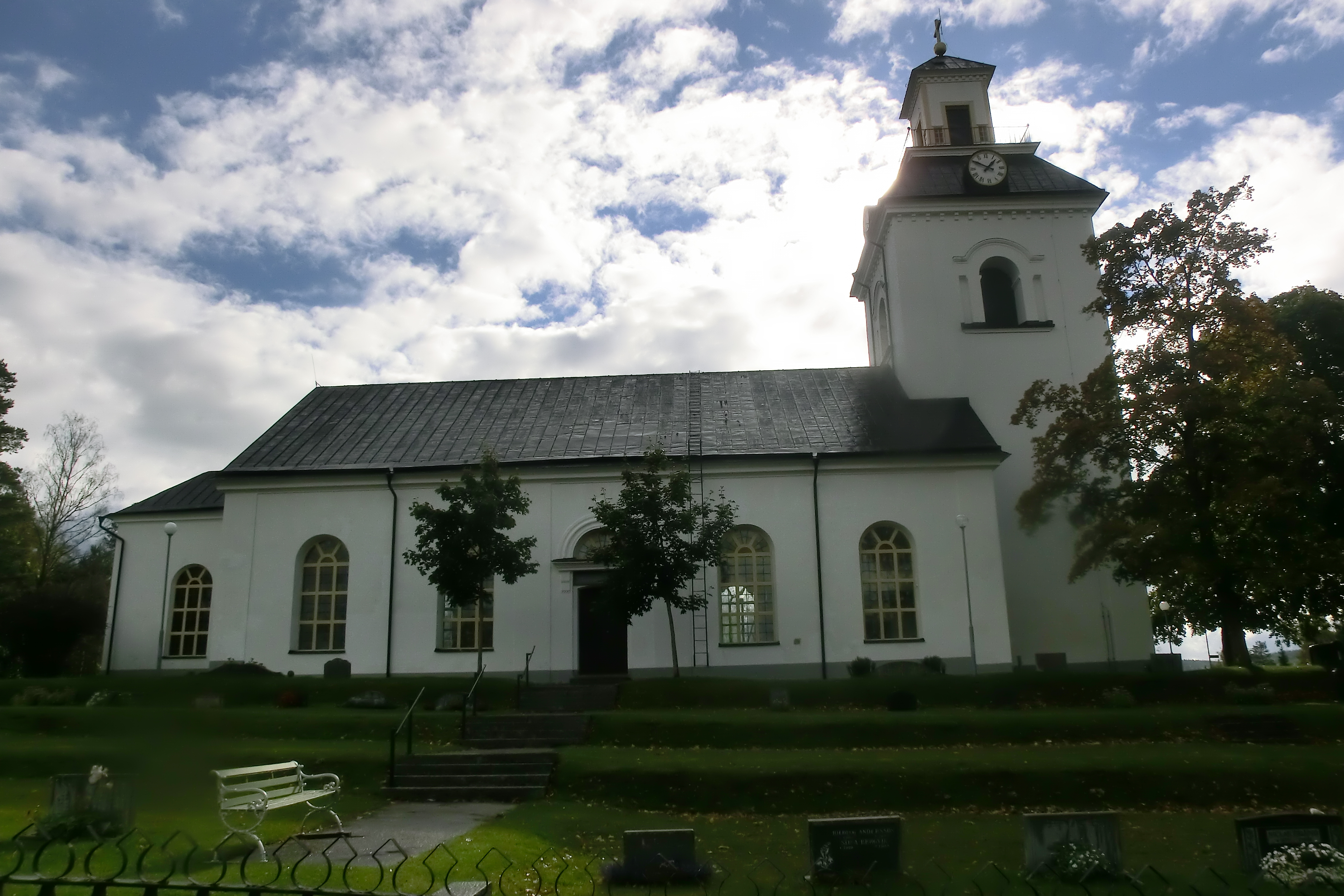

- Location within Sweden Gävleborg Location within Sweden
- Coordinates: 61°51′N 17°03′E
- Country: Sweden
- Province: Hälsingland
- County: Gävleborg County
- Municipality: Nordanstig Municipality

Area
  - Total: 0.62 km^{2} (0.24 sq mi)

Population (31 December 2010)
  - Total: 406
  - Density: 653/km^{2} (1,690/sq mi)
- Time zone: UTC+1 (CET)
  - Summer (DST): UTC+2 (CEST)
- Climate: Dfc

Ilsbo (Swedish pronunciation: [ˈǐːlsbʊ]) is a locality situated in Nordanstig Municipality, Gävleborg County, Sweden with 406 inhabitants in 2010.

== Sports ==
The following sports clubs are located in Ilsbo:

- Ilsbo SK
