= Hybo =

- Location within Sweden Gävleborg Location within Sweden
- Coordinates: 61°48′N 16°12′E
- Country: Sweden
- Province: Hälsingland
- County: Gävleborg County
- Municipality: Ljusdal Municipality

Area
  - Total: 0.60 km^{2} (0.23 sq mi)

Population (31 December 2010)
  - Total: 241
  - Density: 404/km^{2} (1,050/sq mi)
- Time zone: UTC+1 (CET)
  - Summer (DST): UTC+2 (CEST)

Hybo is a locality situated in Ljusdal Municipality, Gävleborg County, Sweden with 241 inhabitants in 2010.
