= Ilsbo SK =

Swedish football club

- Full name: Ilsbo Sportklubb
- Founded: 1933
- Ground: Ilsbo IP; Ilsbo; Sweden
- Chairman: Andreas Nilsson
- League: Division 4 Hälsingland
Home colours	Away colours

Ilsbo SK is a Swedish football club located in Ilsbo.

== Background ==
Ilsbo SK currently plays in Division 4 Hälsingland which is the sixth tier of Swedish football. They play their home matches at the Ilsbo IP in Ilsbo.

The club is affiliated to Hälsinglands Fotbollförbund.

== Season to season ==
In their most successful period Ilsbo SK competed in the following divisions:

Season	Level	Division	Section	Position	Movements
1969	Tier 5	Division 5	Hälsingland		Promoted
1970	Tier 4	Division 4	Hälsingland	8th	
1971	Tier 4	Division 4	Hälsingland	11th	Relegated
1972	Tier 5	Division 5	Hälsingland		Promoted
1973	Tier 4	Division 4	Hälsingland	10th	Relegated

In recent seasons Ilsbo SK have competed in the following divisions:

Season	Level	Division	Section	Position	Movements
2006*	Tier 6	Division 4	Hälsingland	6th	
2007	Tier 6	Division 4	Hälsingland	8th	
2008	Tier 6	Division 4	Hälsingland	12th	Relegated
2009	Tier 7	Division 5	Hälsingland	5th	
2010	Tier 7	Division 5	Hälsingland	2nd	Promoted
2011	Tier 6	Division 4	Hälsingland		

* League restructuring in 2006 resulted in a new division being created at Tier 3 and subsequent divisions dropping a level.
