= Safin Taki =

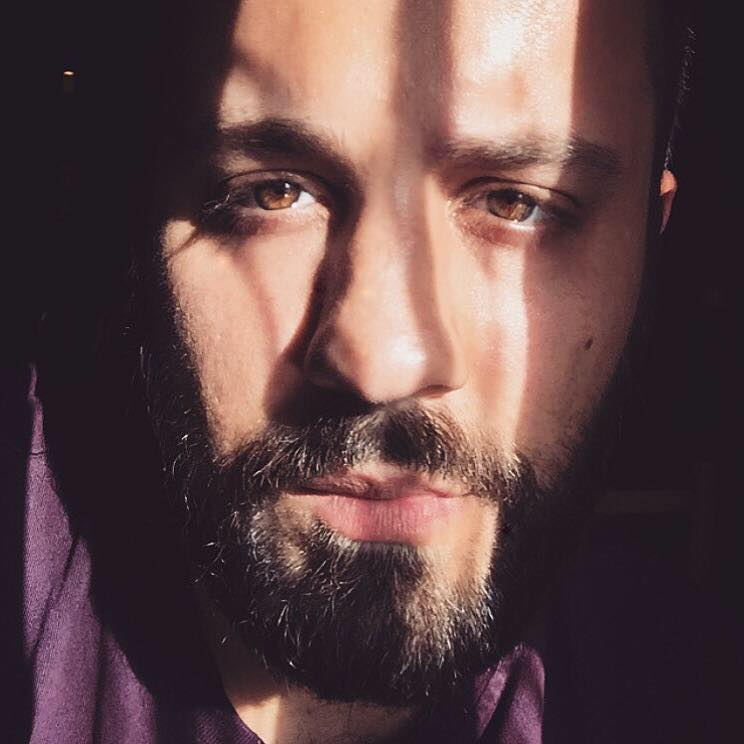
- Born: Safin Sleman Faiq Taki; November 9, 1983 (age 42); Bucharest, Romania
- Education: (BFA) Kurdish School Of Cinema
- Occupations: Cinematographer, Film and Media Producer
- Website: Golden Screen Studios

Safin Taki (born November 9, 1983) is a Kurdish-Swedish producer, director and cinematographer. Safin Taki moved to Sweden at the age of 1 with his parents Sliman Faiq Taki and Leocardia Taki and big brother Aras Taki. Safin grew up in small town in Sweden, Söderhamn. Later on, they moved to Sweden's west coast where Safin began studying film and media.

At the age of 16 Safin directed his first stop-motion animation short film The Expedition. The film was well received at Swedish film festivals winning the Frame Film Festival in Skövde and the Jury's special prize (Lasse Dahlqvist, Lukas Moodysson, Fanny Danielsson) at Novemberfestivalen in Trollhättan, Sweden. In 2001 Safin directed the short film Ingen Återvändo Starring Martin Wallström and Niklas Grussell. The movie was awarded the Swedish Film Institutes "Zoom Priset" and the award for best male performances by the jury (Jacob Bastviken, Josef Fares, Cecillia Nordlund) at the Novemberfestivalen in Trollhättan].

== Filmography ==
- The Expedition, Animation Short (2000) Sweden - (director, cinematography)]
- Borta För Alltid, Short (2001) Sweden - (director, cinematography)
- Ingen Återvändo, Short (2001) Sweden - (director, cinematography)
- Dilemmat, feature (2001) Sweden - (cinematography)
- Rec, Short (2002) Sweden - (cinematography)
- Guldfisken, short (2003) Sweden - (director, cinematography)
- Fester & Rex, Animation Short (2003) Sweden - (director, cinematography)
- Bad Day, short (2006) Kurdistan - (director)
- Twins, short (2006) Kurdistan - (cinematography)
- A New World, short (2006) Kurdistan - (cinematography)
- Newlyweds, short (2007) Kurdistan - (director, cinematography)
- Through the Window, short (2007) Kurdistan - (sound recordist)
- Old and New, short (2007) Kurdistan - (sound recordist)
- Jin ba Jin (trading women), short (2008) Kurdistan - (director)]
- Free Like a Bird, short (2008) Kurdistan - (cinematography)
- Broken Mirror, short (2008) Kurdistan - (cinematography)
- Bloody Honor, short (2008) Kurdistan - (cinematography)
- You Are Not Alone, short (2008) Kurdistan - (cinematography)
- Trauma, short (2008) Kurdistan - (cinematography)
- Golden Years, short (2008) Kurdistan - (cinematography)
- The Cell, short (2008) Kurdistan - (cinematography)
- The Challenge, short (2008) Kurdistan - (cinematography)
- Trying, short (2009) - Kurdistan - (director, cinematography)
- FGM Mustafa Zalmi, documentary (2011) Kurdistan - (cinematography)
- Peaceful Coexistence, documentary (2013) Kurdistan - (cinematography)
- Risk It All, music video (2014) Kurdistan - (producer, cinematography)
- The Life of Street Kids, short (2014) - (cinematography)
- Revolution, music video (2015) Kurdistan - (producer, cinematography)
- Supas Peshmerga, documentary (2015) - (cinematography)
- Mini Library For Refugees, documentary short, (2014) Kurdistan - (cinematography, editor)
- Shouted from the rooftops, short (2016) - (sound recordist)
