= Tallåsen =

- Location within Sweden Gävleborg Location within Sweden
- Coordinates: 61°52′N 16°01′E
- Country: Sweden
- Province: Hälsingland
- County: Gävleborg County
- Municipality: Ljusdal Municipality

Area
  - Total: 1.42 km^{2} (0.55 sq mi)

Population (31 December 2010)
  - Total: 586
  - Density: 412/km^{2} (1,070/sq mi)
- Time zone: UTC+1 (CET)
  - Summer (DST): UTC+2 (CEST)

Tallåsen is a locality situated in Ljusdal Municipality, Gävleborg County, Sweden with 586 inhabitants in 2010. It lies about 5 km northwest of Ljusdal. The village is mainly a bedroom community; most inhabitants commute to Ljusdal. The Sillerboån stream flows through the village.

Tallåsen used to have a railway station, and was one of many Swedish places that blossomed because the railway was built through it at the end of the 19th century.

Year	Inhabitants
2000	621
2003	806
2004	807

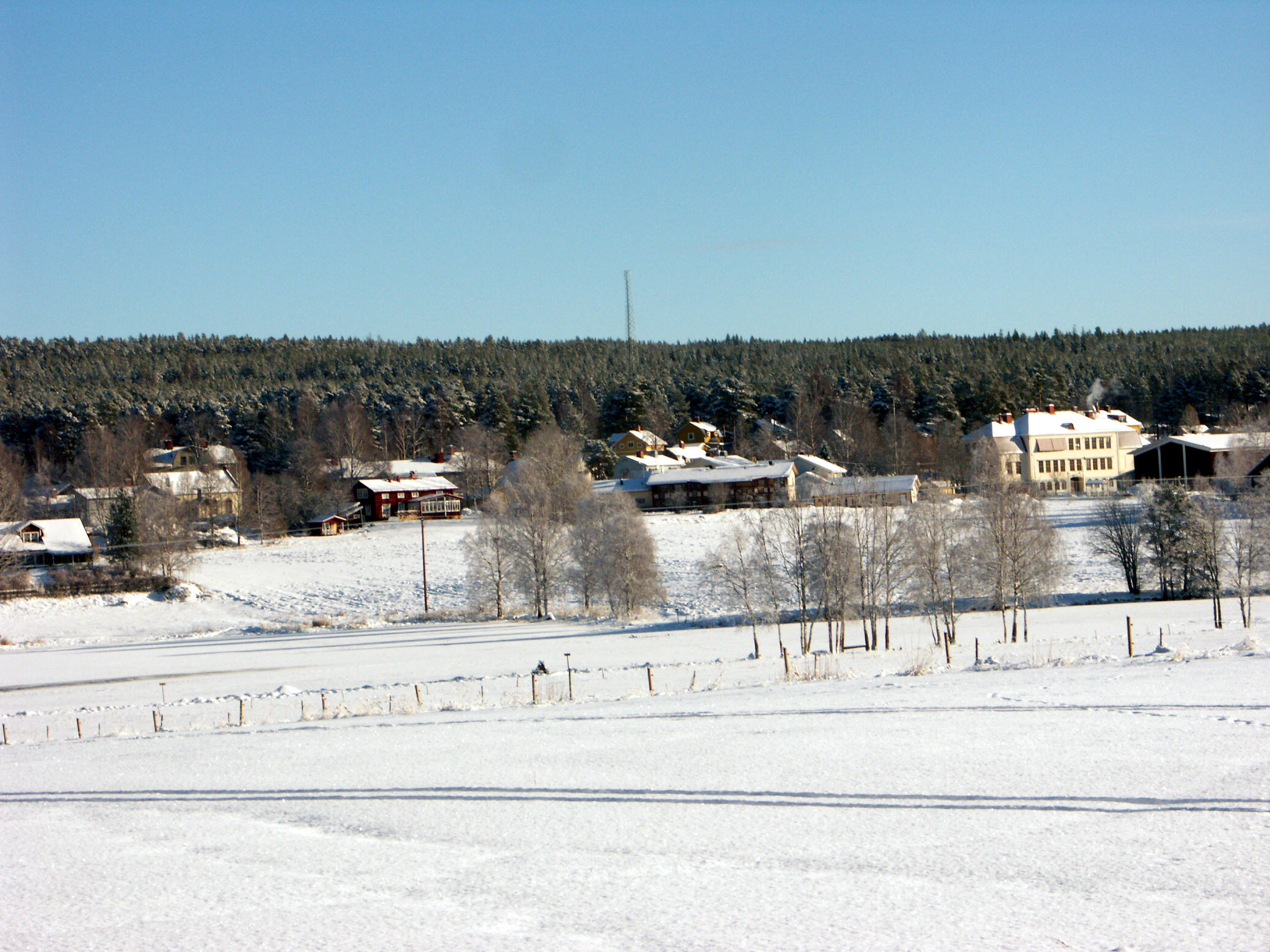
Tallåsen

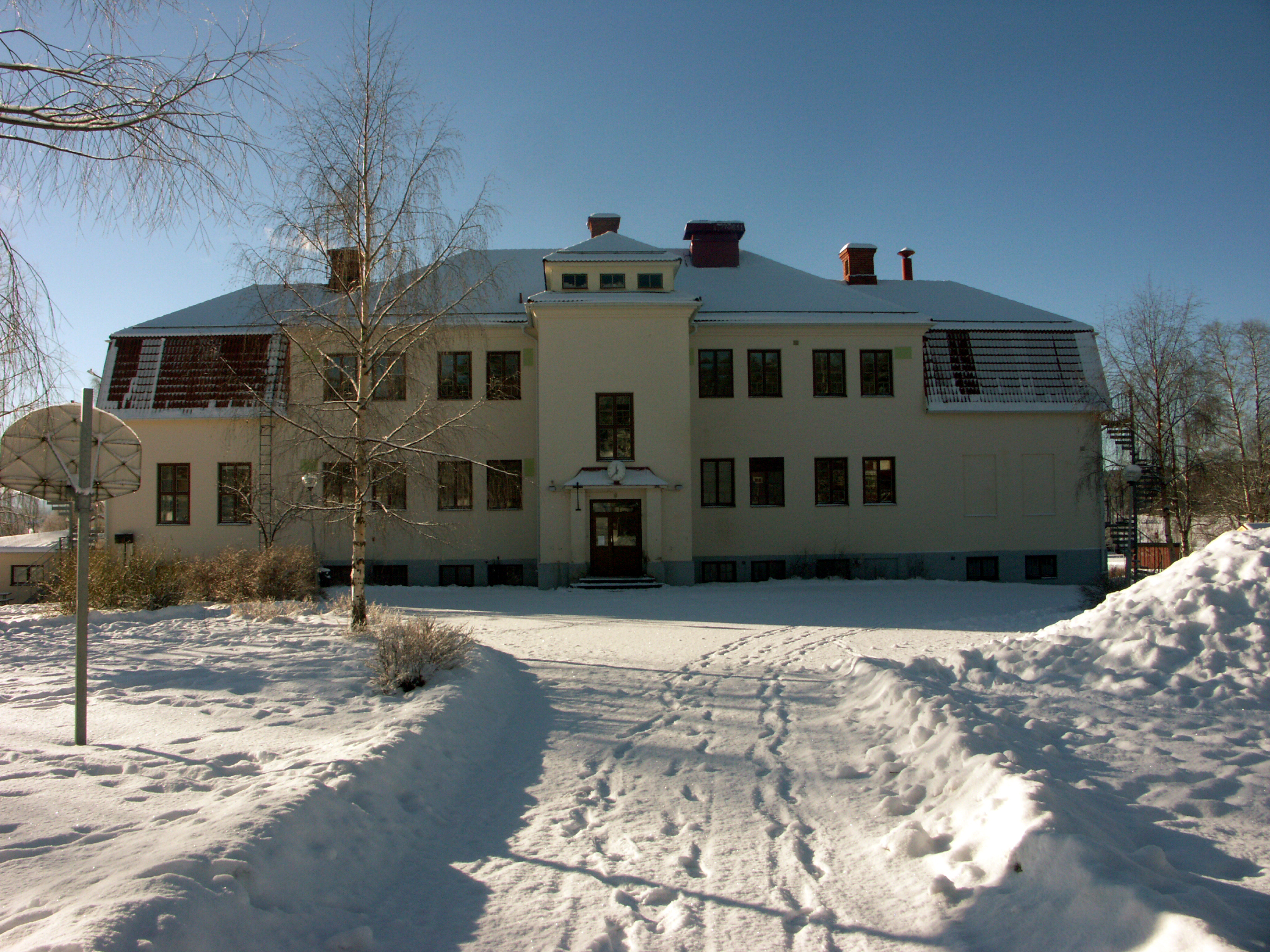
The school of Tallåsens

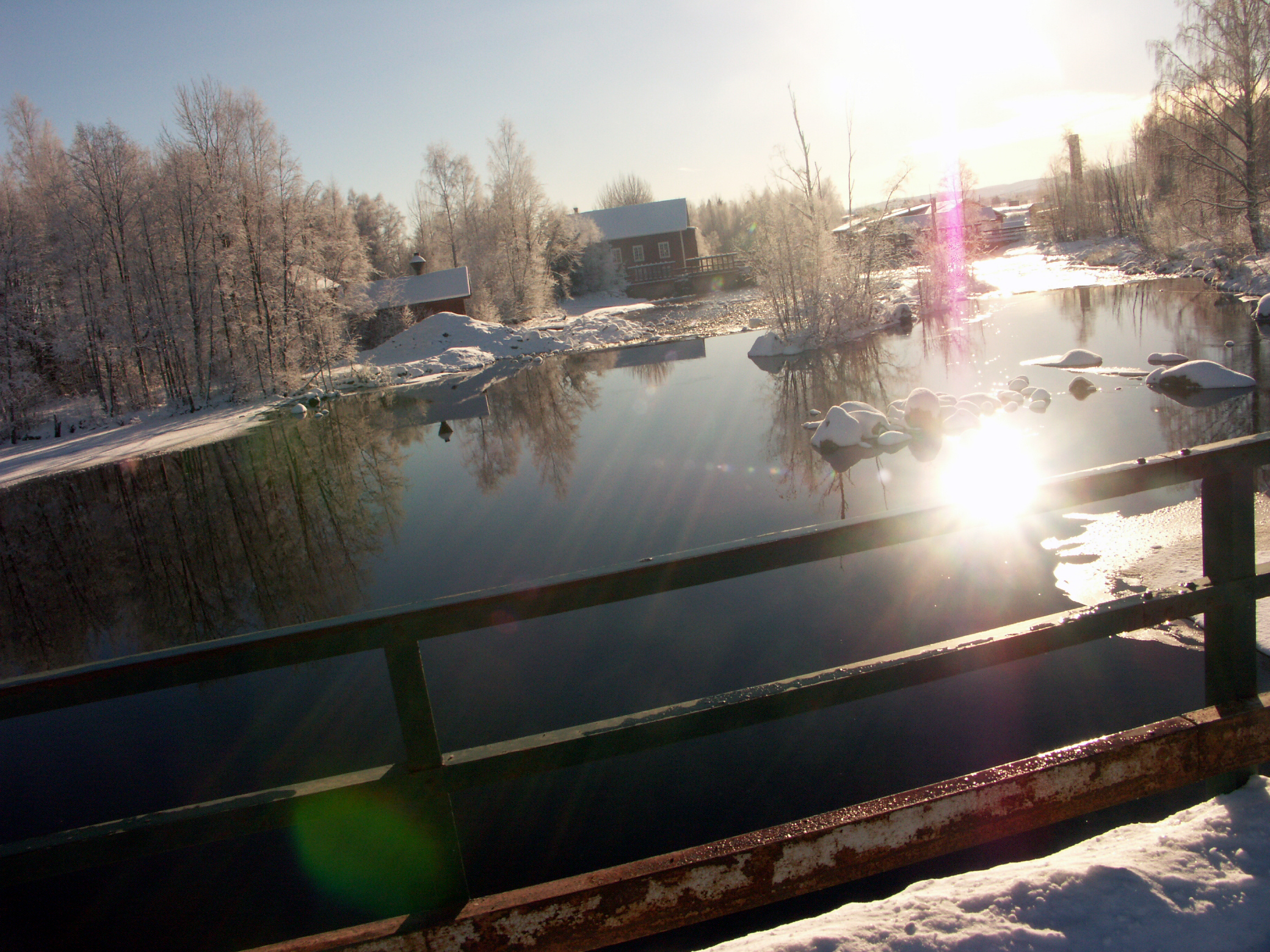
The Mill and Kvarndammen

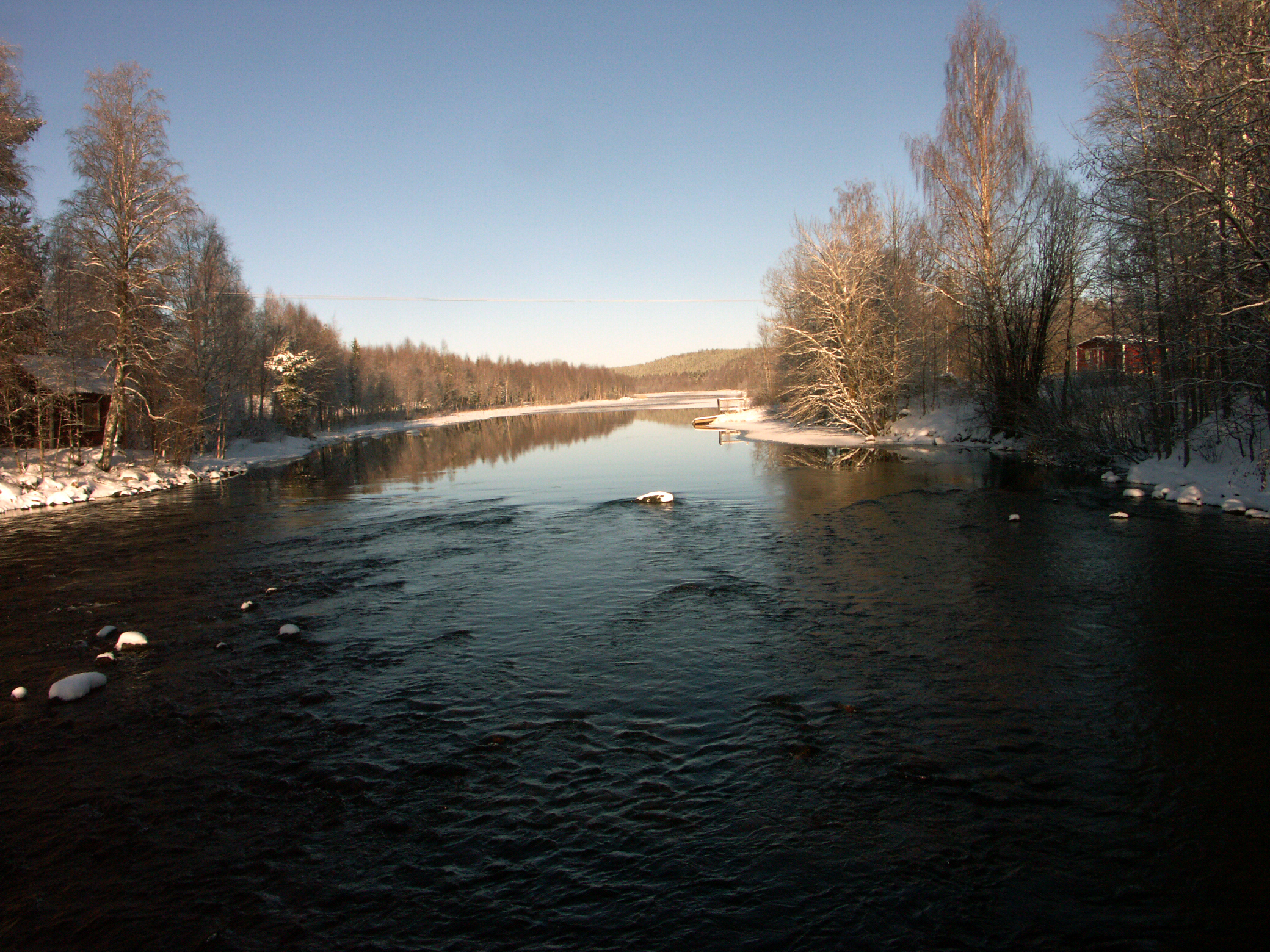
Sillerboån from the Kaffebron

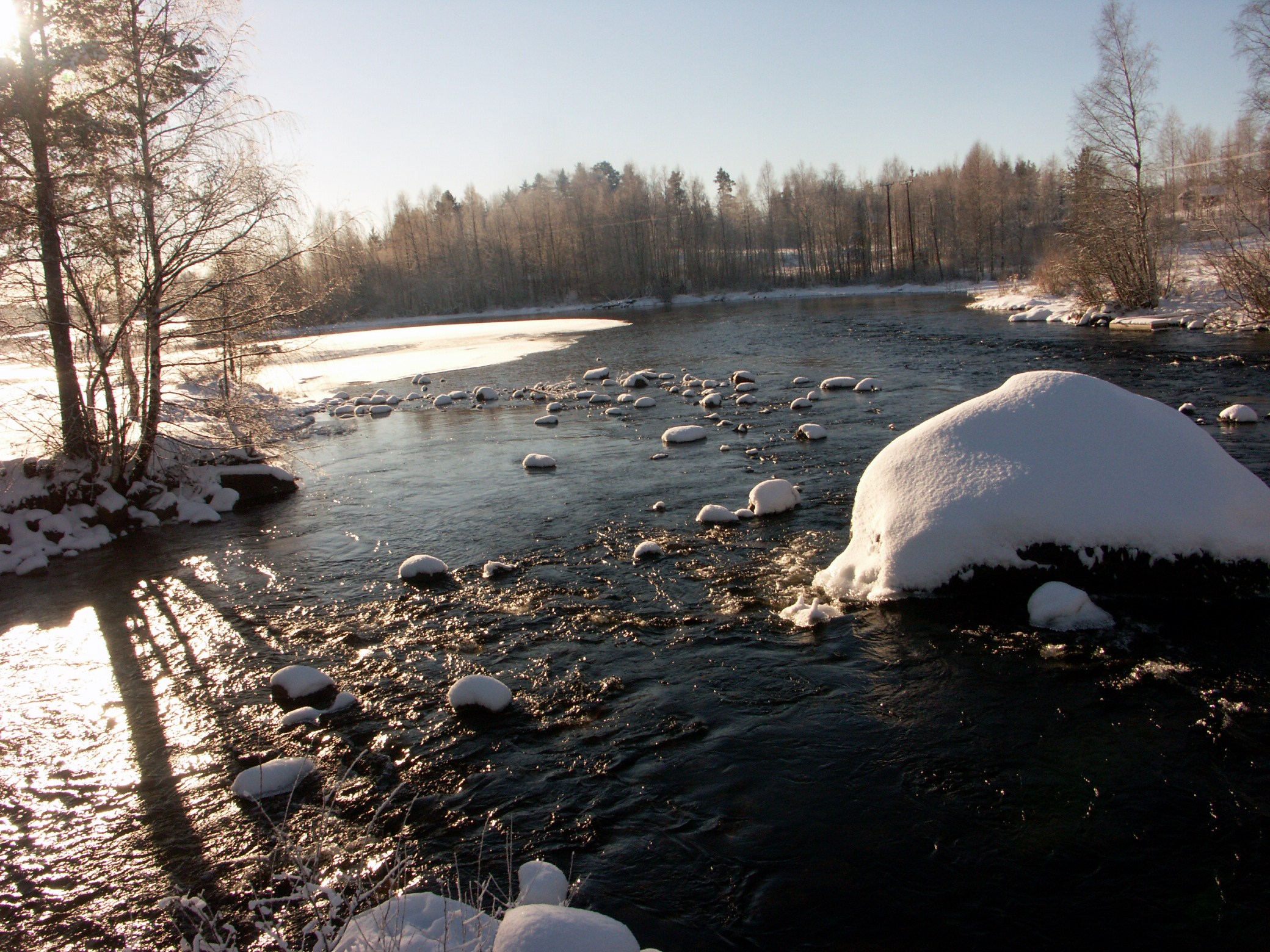
Sillerboån from the Kaffebron
