= Korskrogen =

Locality in Ljusdal Municipality, Sweden

- Småort
- Interactive map of Korskrogen
- Coordinates: 61.8116°N 15.7545°E
- Country: Sweden
- Province: Hälsingland
- County: Gävleborg County
- Municipality: Ljusdal Municipality

Area
  - Total: 0.70 km^{2} (0.27 sq mi)

Population (2005)
  - Total: 186
  - Density: 270/km^{2} (690/sq mi)
- Time zone: UTC+1 (CET)
  - Summer (DST): UTC+2 (CEST)

Korskrogen is a locality (småort) in Färila parish, Ljusdal Municipality, Gävleborg County, Sweden, in the province of Hälsingland. It lies on the Ljusnan about 5 km west of Färila and 21 km west of Ljusdal, and had 186 inhabitants in 2005.

== Etymology ==
The name originally referred to a krog, a simple roadside inn. The prefix kors- ('cross') indicates that the inn stood at a road junction, most likely where an earlier route of the road between Färila and Härjedalen met the road to Los. The same name occurs at five other places in Sweden, in Dalarna, Närke and Östergötland.

== Geography ==
The stretch of the Ljusnan at Korskrogen, the Mellanljusnan, is a Natura 2000 conservation area of 1,086 hectares, divided into two sites that meet at the village: Mellanljusnan Laforsen–Korskrogen and Mellanljusnan Korskrogen–Edeforsen. Unlike most of the river, this reach is largely unregulated and retains undeveloped rapids; the County Administrative Board notes its geomorphology and its flora and fauna.

== Population ==
Statistics Sweden classified Korskrogen as an urban area (tätort) through the later 20th century. Its recorded population peaked at 275 in 1960 and then declined, falling to 215 by 2000. In 2005 it dropped below the threshold for tätort status and was reclassified as a småort, with 186 inhabitants.

Population
| Year | Population |
|---|---|
| 1960 | 275 |
| 1965 | 246 |
| 1970 | 247 |
| 1975 | 209 |
| 1980 | 212 |
| 1990 | 211 |
| 1995 | 214 |
| 2000 | 215 |
| 2005 | 186 |
1960–2000 as a tätort; 2005 as a småort. Source: Statistics Sweden.

== Amenities ==
The village has a preschool and a sports club, Korskrogens IK, founded in 1931.
