= Järvzoo =

Zoo in Järvsö, Sweden

Coordinates: 61.71025°N 16.15431°E

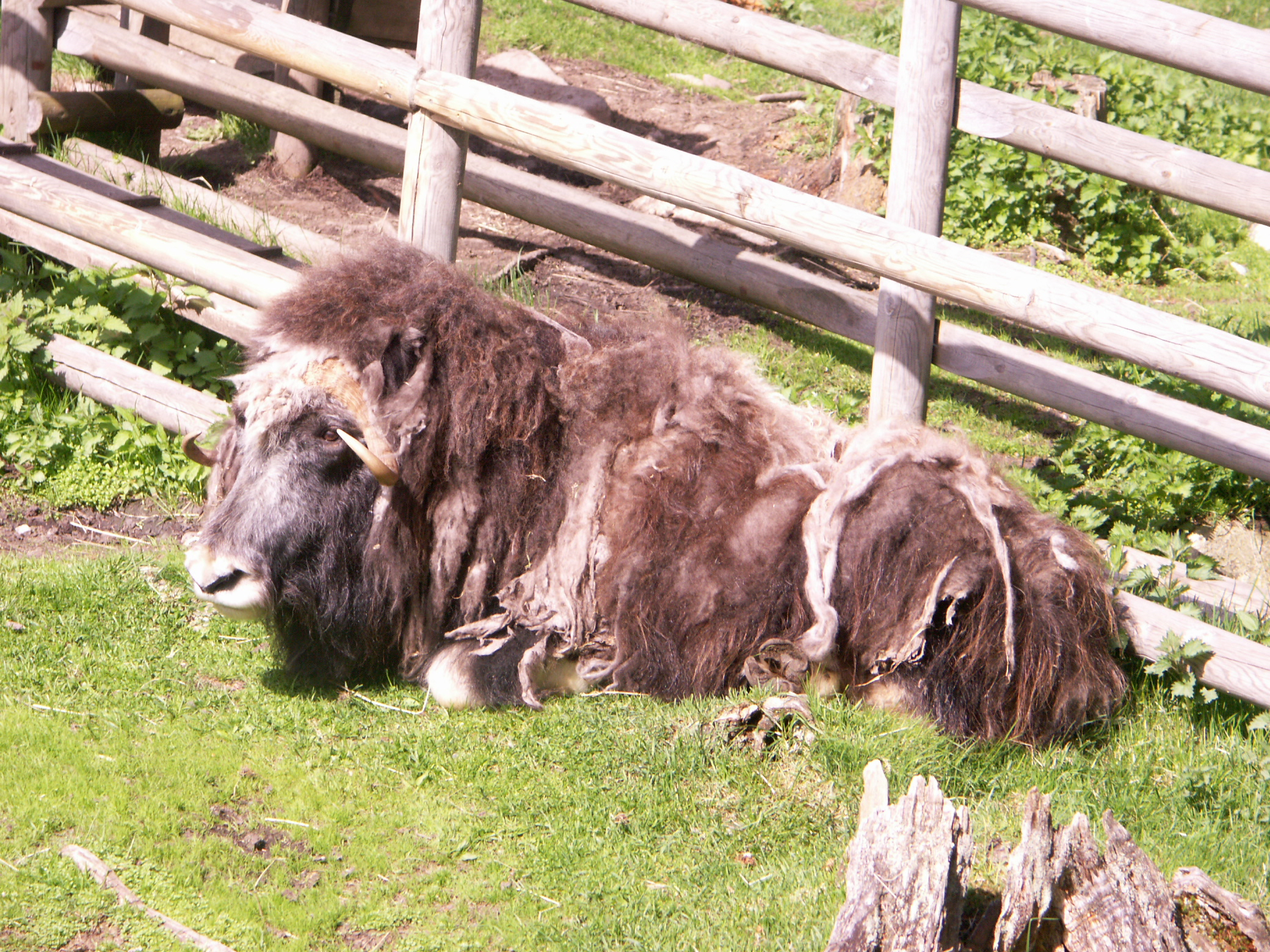
- A musk ox shedding its coat
- Interactive map of Järvzoo
- Location: Järvsö, Sweden

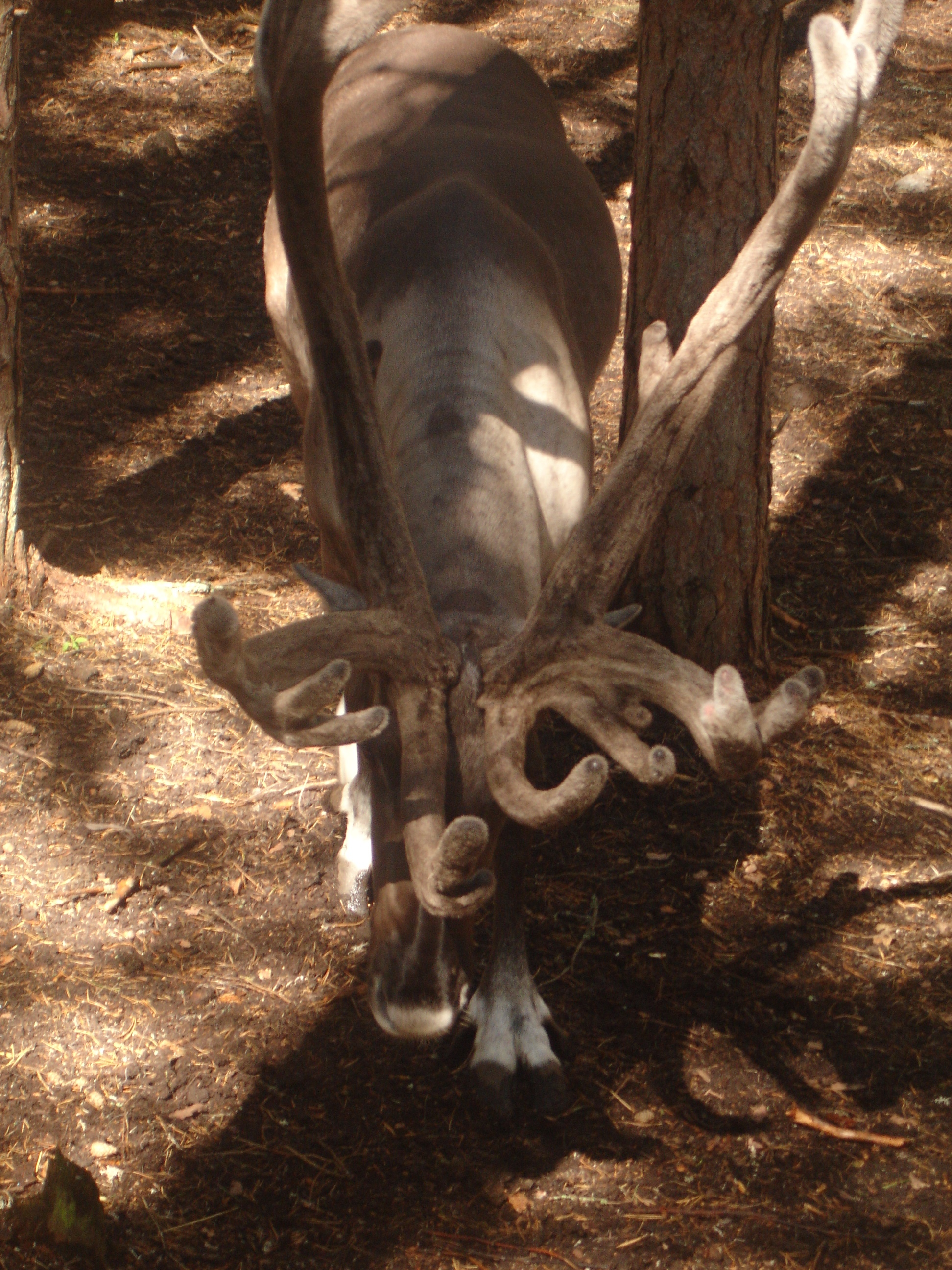
A reindeer about to be fed

Järvzoo is a zoo in Järvsö, Sweden, which has a large collection of Nordic animals. These include the major carnivores of Sweden: the wolf, arctic fox, bear, lynx, and wolverine, as well as moose, roe deer, reindeer, Finnish forest reindeer, and several species of birds. In the debate on the reintroduction of the wild boar, which was eradicated from Sweden at the end of the 19th century, it was stated in 2014 that Järvzoo and the wild boar there could play a central role in a reintroduction project.
