= Trönö IK =

Swedish football club

- Full name: Trönö Idrottsklubb
- Nickname: TIK
- Ground: Trönö IP; Trönödal, Sweden
- Chairman: Hans-Åke Hansson
- League: Division 3 Södra Norrland
- 2010: Division 3 Södra Norrland, 8th
Home colours	Away colours

Trönö IK is a Swedish football club located in Trönödal in Hälsingland.

== Background ==
Since their foundation Trönö IK has participated mainly in the middle and lower divisions of the Swedish football league system. The club currently plays in Division 3 Södra Norrland which is the fifth tier of Swedish football. They play their home matches at the Trönö IP in Trönödal.

Trönö IK are affiliated to Hälsinglands Fotbollförbund.

== Recent history ==
In recent seasons Trönö IK have competed in the following divisions:

2011 – Division III, Södra Norrland
2010 – Division III, Södra Norrland
2009 – Division IV, Hälsingland
2008 – Division IV, Hälsingland
2007 – Division IV, Hälsingland
2006 – Division IV, Hälsingland
2005 – Division V, Hälsingland
2004 – Division IV, Hälsingland
2003 – Division V, Hälsingland
2002 – Division V, Hälsingland
2001 – Division V, Hälsingland
2000 – Division V Hälsingland
1999 – Division V Hälsingland

== Current Squad for the 2011 season ==
Note: Flags indicate national team as defined under FIFA eligibility rules; some limited exceptions apply. Players may hold more than one non-FIFA nationality.

No.	Pos.	Nation	Player
1	GK	SWE	Niklas Johansson
3	DF	SWE	Mikael Forss
4	DF	SWE	Christian Höijer
5	DF	SWE	Erik Hellbom
6	MF	SWE	Emil Oremo
7	MF	SWE	Per Olsson
8	MF	SWE	Jonas Lif
10	DF	SWE	Emil Nordqvist
11	DF	SWE	Alexander Eriksson

No.	Pos.	Nation	Player
13	MF	SWE	Johan Inglund
14	DF	SWE	Anders Burman
15	FW	SWE	Thomas Wallgren
17	MF	SWE	Magnus Wallgren
18	FW	SWE	Christer Wallgren
19	MF	SWE	Mats Nilsson
20	MF	SWE	Daniel Pettersson
21	FW	SWE	Viktor Lif
23	GK	SWE	Emil Johansson

== Attendances ==
In recent seasons Trönö IK have had the following average attendances:

Season	Average attendance	Division / Section	Level
2008	Not available	Div 4 Hälsingland	Tier 6
2009	179	Div 4 Hälsingland	Tier 6
2010	177	Div 3 Södra Norrland	Tier 5

* Attendances are provided in the Publikliga sections of the Svenska Fotbollförbundet website.
