= Stugsunds IK =

Swedish football club

- Full name: Stugsunds Idrottsklubb
- Ground: Stuvarvallen; Söderhamn; Sweden
- Chairman: Magnus Ludvigsson
- League: Division 4 Hälsingland
Home colours	Away colours

Stugsunds IK is a Swedish football club located in Söderhamn.

== Background ==
Stugsunds IK currently plays in Division 4 Hälsingland which is the sixth tier of Swedish football. They play their home matches at the Stuvarvallen in Söderhamn.

The club is affiliated to Hälsinglands Fotbollförbund.

== Season to season ==
In their most successful period Stugsunds IK competed in the following divisions:

Season	Level	Division	Section	Position	Movements
1935–36	Tier 3	Division 3	Uppsvenska Östra	7th	
1936–37	Tier 3	Division 3	Uppsvenska Östra	6th	
1937–38	Tier 3	Division 3	Uppsvenska Östra	8th	Relegated

In recent seasons Stugsunds IK have competed in the following divisions:

Season	Level	Division	Section	Position	Movements
2006*	Tier 6	Division 4	Hälsingland	9th	
2007	Tier 6	Division 4	Hälsingland	10th	
2008	Tier 6	Division 4	Hälsingland	5th	
2009	Tier 6	Division 4	Hälsingland	10th	
2010	Tier 6	Division 4	Hälsingland	9th	
2011	Tier 6	Division 4	Hälsingland		

* League restructuring in 2006 resulted in a new division being created at Tier 3 and subsequent divisions dropping a level.
