= Los, Sweden =

Los
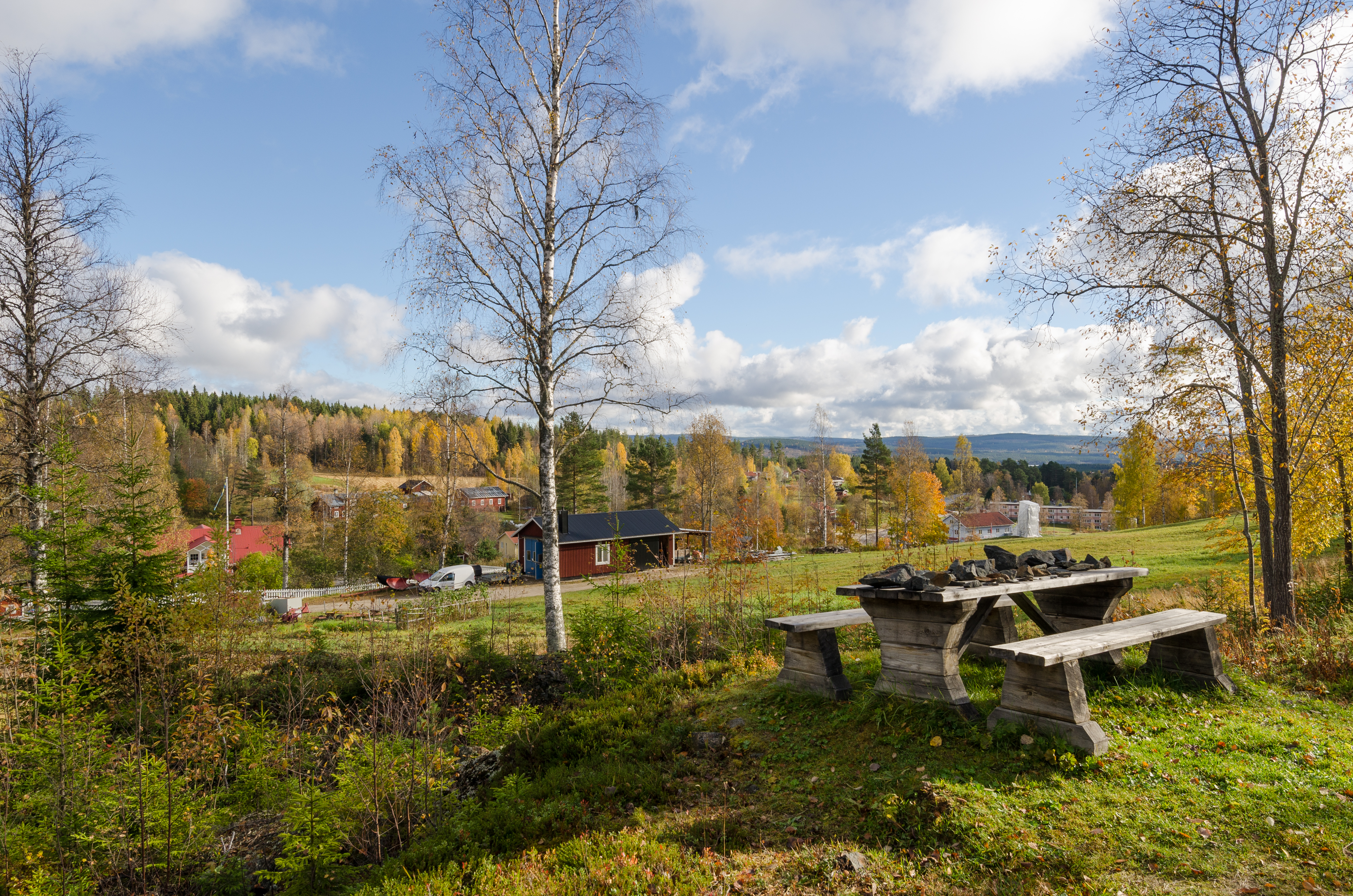
- Los seen from the site of the former Los cobalt mine.

- Location within Sweden Gävleborg Location within Sweden
- Coordinates: 61°44′N 15°10′E
- Country: Sweden
- Province: Hälsingland
- County: Gävleborg County
- Municipality: Ljusdal Municipality

Area
  - Total: 1.61 km^{2} (0.62 sq mi)

Population (31 December 2010)
  - Total: 387
  - Density: 241/km^{2} (620/sq mi)
- Time zone: UTC+1 (CET)
  - Summer (DST): UTC+2 (CEST)

Los is a locality situated in Ljusdal Municipality, Gävleborg County, Sweden with 332 inhabitants in 2020.

The village is known for its 18th-century cobalt mine, where Axel Fredrik Cronstedt discovered the chemical element of nickel in 1751. Today, the mine is a tourist attraction.

An 8-kilometre-wide crater on Mars was officially named after this village in 1979. The crater is located at 35.4°S and 76.3°W on the Martian surface.
