= Färila IF =

Swedish football club

- Full name: Färila Idrottsförening
- Ground: Färila IP; Färila; Sweden
- League: Division 4 Hälsingland
Home colours	Away colours

Färila IF is a Swedish football club located in Färila.

== Background ==
Färila IF currently plays in Division 4 Hälsingland which is the sixth tier of Swedish football. They play their home matches at the Färila IP in Färila.

The club is affiliated to Hälsinglands Fotbollförbund.

== Season to season ==
In their most successful period Färila IF competed in the following divisions:

Season	Level	Division	Section	Position	Movements
1979	Tier 4	Division 4	Hälsingland	1st	Promoted
1980	Tier 3	Division 3	Södra Norrland	9th	
1981	Tier 3	Division 3	Södra Norrland	10th	Relegated
1982	Tier 4	Division 4	Hälsingland	11th	Relegated
1983	Tier 5	Division 5	Hälsingland		Promoted
1984	Tier 4	Division 4	Hälsingland	2nd	
1985	Tier 4	Division 4	Hälsingland	2nd	
1986	Tier 4	Division 4	Hälsingland	2nd	
1987	Tier 4	Division 3	Södra Norrland	11th	Relegated
1988	Tier 5	Division 4	Hälsingland		Promoted
1989	Tier 4	Division 3	Södra Norrland	10th	Relegated

In recent seasons Färila IF have competed in the following divisions:

Season	Level	Division	Section	Position	Movements
1998	Tier 6	Division 5	Hälsingland		Promoted
1999	Tier 5	Division 4	Hälsingland	1st	Promoted
2000	Tier 4	Division 3	Södra Norrland	10th	Relegated
2001	Tier 5	Division 4	Hälsingland	2nd	Promotion Playoffs
2002	Tier 5	Division 4	Hälsingland	13th	Relegated
2000	Tier 6	Division 5	Hälsingland	1st	Promoted
2004	Tier 5	Division 4	Hälsingland	12th	Relegated
2005	Tier 7	Division 6	Hälsingland Norra	4th	
2006*	Tier 8	Division 6	Hälsingland Norra	1st	Promoted
2007	Tier 7	Division 5	Hälsingland	4th	
2008	Tier 7	Division 5	Hälsingland	2nd	Promoted
2009	Tier 6	Division 4	Hälsingland	6th	
2010	Tier 6	Division 4	Hälsingland	5th	
2011	Tier 6	Division 4	Hälsingland		

* League restructuring in 2006 resulted in a new division being created at Tier 3 and subsequent divisions dropping a level.
