= Bollnäs GIF Fotboll =

Swedish football club

Bollnäs GIF FF
- Full name: Bollnäs Gymnastik- och Idrottsförening Fotbollsförening
- Ground: Sävstaås IP; Bollnäs; Sweden
- Chairman: Marita Håkansson
- Coach: Torbjörn Nilsson; Urban Mannelqvist (kit man)
- League: Division 3 Södra Norrland
Home colours	Away colours

Bollnäs GIF FF is a Swedish football club located in Bollnäs.

== Background ==
Since their foundation, Bollnäs GIF FF has participated in the upper and lower divisions of the Swedish football league system. The club played in Division 4 Hälsingland in 2014 which is the sixth tier of Swedish football. The first place in the league promoted the team to Division 3 Södra Norrland season 2015. They play their home matches at the Sävstaås IP in Bollnäs.

Bollnäs GIF FF is affiliated with the Hälsinglands Fotbollförbund.

The Bollnäs GIF bandy team is highly successful.

== Season to season ==
In their early history Bollnäs GIF competed in the following divisions:

Season	Level	Division	Section	Position	Movements
1932–33	Tier 3	Division 3	Uppsvenska	4th	
1933–34	Tier 3	Division 3	Uppsvenska	1st	Promoted
1934–35	Tier 2	Division 2	Norra	8th	
1935–36	Tier 2	Division 2	Norra	7th	
1936–37	Tier 2	Division 2	Norra	8th	
1937–38	Tier 2	Division 2	Norra	8th	
1938–39	Tier 2	Division 2	Norra	9th	Relegated
1939–40	Tier 3	Division 3	Uppsvenska Östra	5th	
1940–41	Tier 3	Division 3	Uppsvenska Sydöstra	8th	
1941–42	Tier 3	Division 3	Uppsvenska Sydöstra	5th	
1942–43	Tier 3	Division 3	Uppsvenska Sydöstra	10th	Relegated
1943–44	Tier 4	Division 4			Promoted
1944–45	Tier 3	Division 3	Uppsvenska Sydöstra	8th	
1945–46	Tier 3	Division 3	Uppsvenska Sydöstra	7th	

In recent seasons Bollnäs GIF have competed in the following divisions:

Season	Level	Division	Section	Position	Movements
1993	Tier 3	Division 2	Östra Svealand	10th	Relegation Playoffs – Relegated
1994	Tier 4	Division 3	Södra Norrland	6th	
1995	Tier 4	Division 3	Södra Norrland	11th	Relegated
1996	Tier 5	Division 4	Hälsingland	1st	Promoted
1997	Tier 4	Division 3	Södra Norrland	5th	
1998	Tier 4	Division 3	Södra Norrland	4th	
1999	Tier 4	Division 3	Södra Norrland	3rd	
2000	Tier 4	Division 3	Södra Norrland	2nd	Promotion Playoffs
2001	Tier 4	Division 3	Södra Norrland	12th	Relegated
2002	Tier 5	Division 4	Hälsingland	4th	
2003	Tier 5	Division 4	Hälsingland	3rd	
2004	Tier 5	Division 4	Hälsingland	2nd	Promotion Playoffs – Promoted
2005	Tier 4	Division 3	Södra Norrland	8th	
2006*	Tier 5	Division 3	Södra Norrland	2nd	Promotion Playoffs
2007	Tier 5	Division 3	Södra Norrland	8th	
2008	Tier 5	Division 3	Södra Norrland	11th	Relegated
2009	Tier 6	Division 4	Hälsingland	2nd	
2010	Tier 6	Division 4	Hälsingland	7th	
2011	Tier 6	Division 4	Hälsingland	3rd	
2012	Tier 6	Division 4	Hälsingland	3rd	
2013	Tier 6	Division 4	Hälsingland	3rd	
2014	Tier 6	Division 4	Hälsingland	1st	Promoted

* League restructuring in 2006 resulted in a new division being created at Tier 3 and subsequent divisions dropping a level.

== Attendances ==
In recent seasons Bollnäs GIF FF have had the following average attendances:

Season	Average attendance	Division / Section	Level
2005	170	Div 3 Södra Norrland	Tier 4
2006	221	Div 3 Södra Norrland	Tier 5
2007	103	Div 3 Södra Norrland	Tier 5
2008	149	Div 3 Södra Norrland	Tier 5
2009	160	Div 4 Hälsingland	Tier 6
2010	101	Div 4 Hälsingland	Tier 6
2011	125	Div 4 Hälsingland	Tier 6
2012	93	Div 4 Hälsingland	Tier 6
2013	91	Div 4 Hälsingland	Tier 6
2014	116	Div 4 Hälsingland	Tier 6

* Attendances are provided in the Publikliga sections of the Svenska Fotbollförbundet website.
