= Edsbyns IF Fotboll =

Swedish football club

Edsbyns IF FF
- Full name: Edsbyns Idrottsförening Fotbollförening
- Founded: 1909
- Ground: Öns IP; Edsbyn; Sweden
- Chairman: Sven Miller
- Coach: Ola Larshans; Christian Fagerhov
- League: Division 3 Södra Norrland
- 2010: Division 4 Hälsingland, 1st (Promoted)
Home colours	Away colours

Edsbyns IF FF is a Swedish football club in Edsbyn in Ovanåker Municipality in Sweden.

== Background ==
Edsbyns IF, founded on 6 June 1909, is a sports club in Edsbyn. The bandy section of the club was founded as late as in 1925 and in 2000 the section was formally made a club of its own.

Since their foundation Edsbyns IF FF has participated mainly in the middle and lower divisions of the Swedish football league system. The club currently plays in Division 3 Södra Norrland which is the fifth tier of Swedish football. They play their home matches at the Öns IP in Edsbyn.

Edsbyns IF FF are affiliated to Hälsinglands Fotbollförbund.

== Recent history ==
In recent seasons Edsbyns IF FF have competed in the following divisions:

2011 – Division III, Södra Norrland
2010 – Division IV, Hälsingland
2009 – Division IV, Hälsingland
2008 – Division IV, Hälsingland
2007 – Division IV, Hälsingland
2006 – Division III, Södra Norrland
2005 – Division III, Södra Norrland
2004 – Division IV, Hälsingland
2003 – Division IV, Hälsingland
2002 – Division IV, Hälsingland
2001 – Division III, Södra Norrland
2000 – Division III, Södra Norrland
1999 – Division II, Östra Svealand
1998 – Division III, Södra Norrland
1997 – Division IV, Hälsingland
1996 – Division IV, Hälsingland
1995 – Division IV, Hälsingland
1994 – Division IV, Hälsingland
1993 – Division V, Hälsingland

== Attendances ==
In recent seasons Edsbyns IF FF have had the following average attendances:

Season	Average attendance	Division / Section	Level
2001	163	Div 3 Södra Norrland	Tier 4
2002	Not available	Div 4 Hälsingland	Tier 5
2003	Not available	Div 4 Hälsingland	Tier 5
2004	Not available	Div 4 Hälsingland	Tier 5
2005	170	Div 3 Södra Norrland	Tier 4
2006	99	Div 3 Södra Norrland	Tier 5
2007	Not available	Div 4 Hälsingland	Tier 6
2008	Not available	Div 4 Hälsingland	Tier 6
2009	118	Div 4 Hälsingland	Tier 6
2010	114	Div 4 Hälsingland	Tier 6

* Attendances are provided in the Publikliga sections of the Svenska Fotbollförbundet website and European Football Statistics website.
