= Hennan =

Village in Ljusdal Municipality, Sweden

Coordinates: 62°01′N 15°54′E

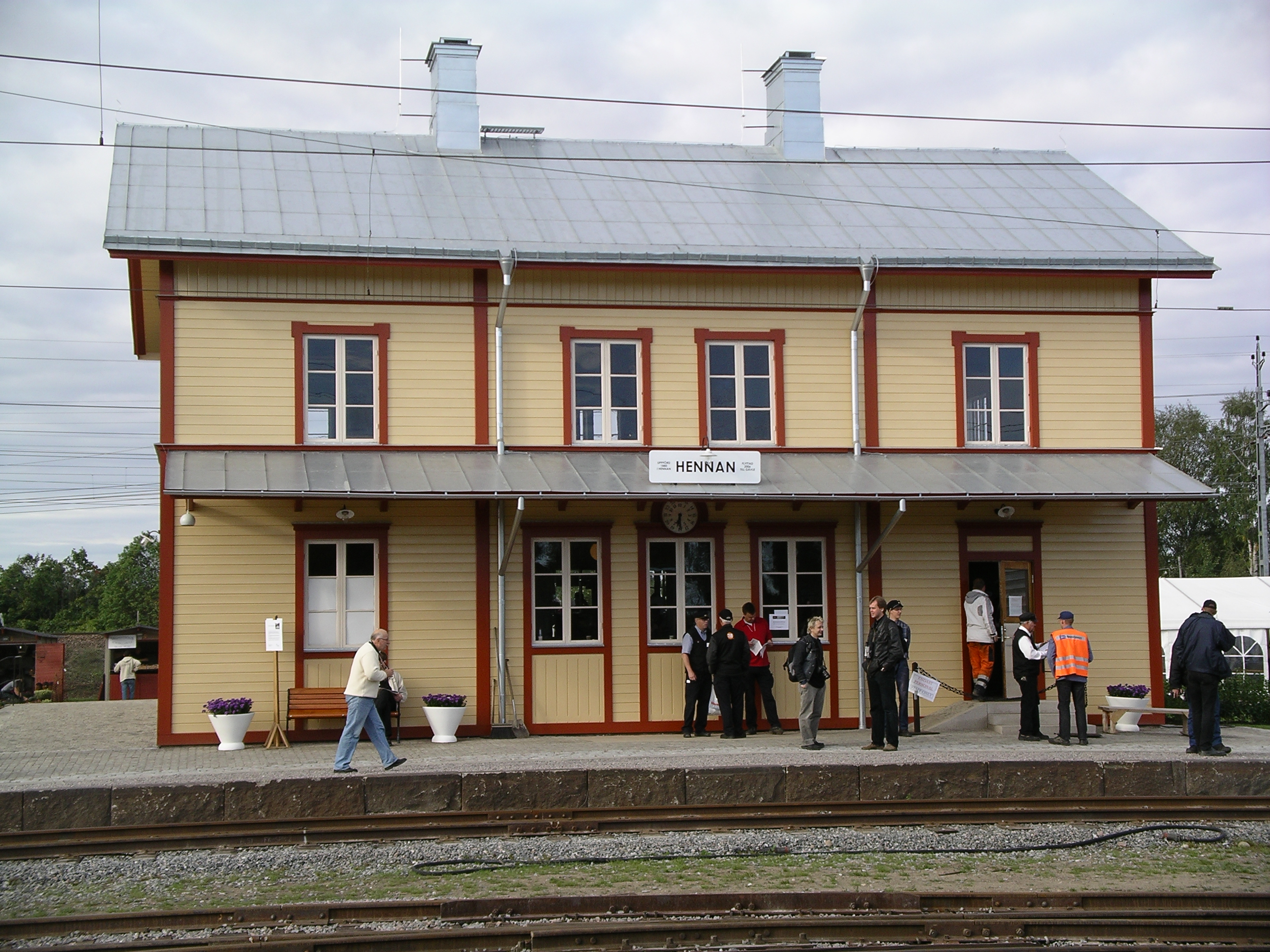
Hennan railway station at Gävle Railway Museum

Hennan is a village in Ljusdal Municipality, Hälsingland, Gävleborg County, Sweden with about 227 inhabitants. (2004, Statistics Sweden).
