= Söderhamn =

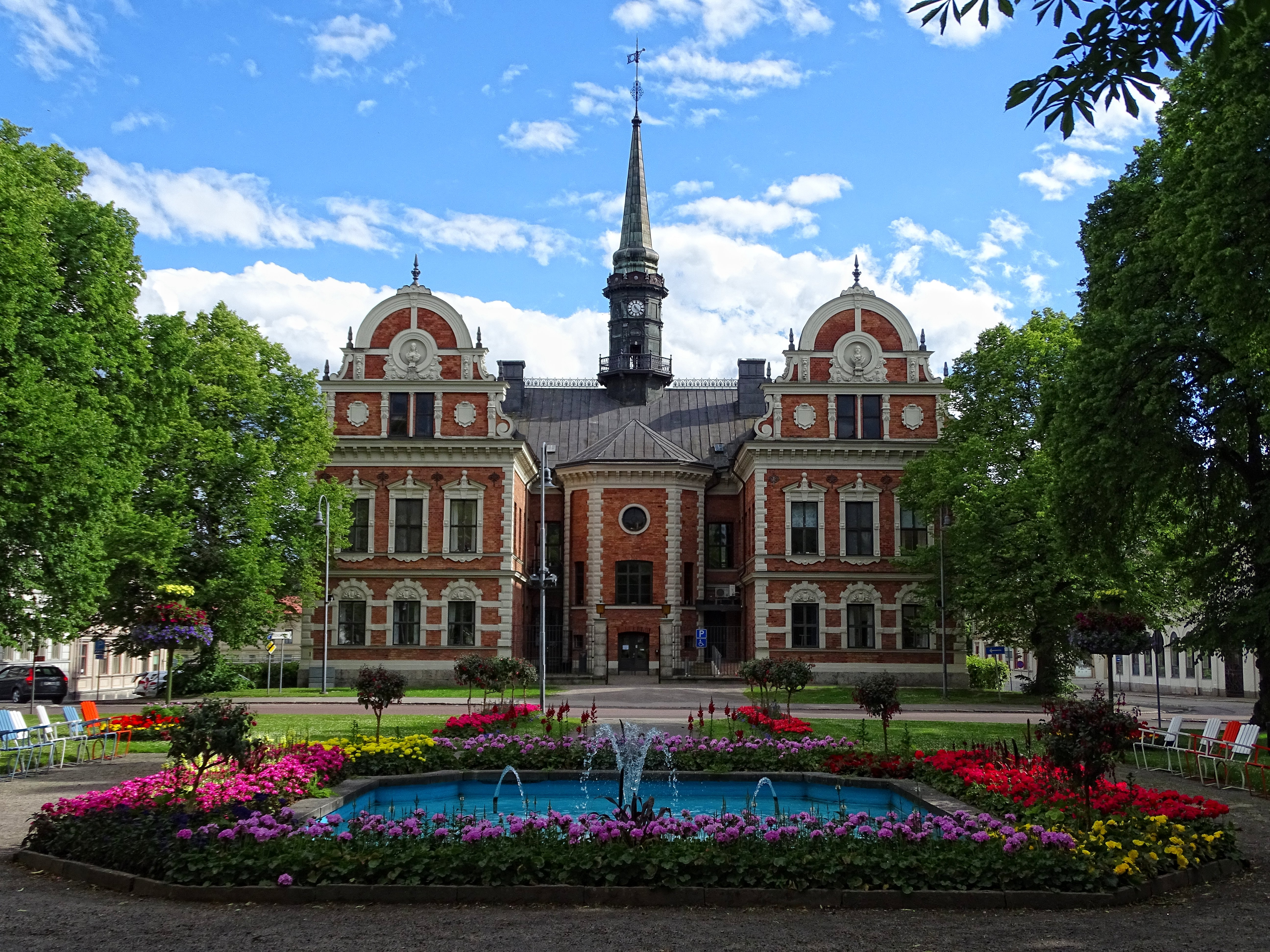
- Söderhamn City Hall in July 2016

- Location within Sweden Gävleborg Location within Sweden
- Coordinates: 61°18′N 17°05′E
- Country: Sweden
- Province: Hälsingland
- County: Gävleborg County
- Municipality: Söderhamn Municipality

Area
  - Total: 10.53 km^{2} (4.07 sq mi)

Population (31 December 2010)
  - Total: 11,761
  - Density: 1,117/km^{2} (2,890/sq mi)
- Time zone: UTC+1 (CET)
  - Summer (DST): UTC+2 (CEST)
- Website: http://www.soderhamn.se/

Söderhamn is a locality and the seat of Söderhamn Municipality, Gävleborg County, Sweden with 11,761 inhabitants in 2010.

== Sports ==
The biggest local sport is bandy. Broberg/Söderhamn Bandy play in the highest division Elitserien and have become Swedish champions five times. In October 2017 the indoor venue Helsingehus Arena was inaugurated. The coach of the national bandy team and members of the Federation of International Bandy board, such as the current Secretary General Bo Nyman, have come from Söderhamn.

Söderhamns FF and Stugsunds IK are the local football clubs.

== Notable residents ==
- Safin Taki, film producer, director and cinematographer who grew up in Söderhamn.
- Jan Johansson, jazz musician and pianist who was born in Söderhamn.

== Gallery ==
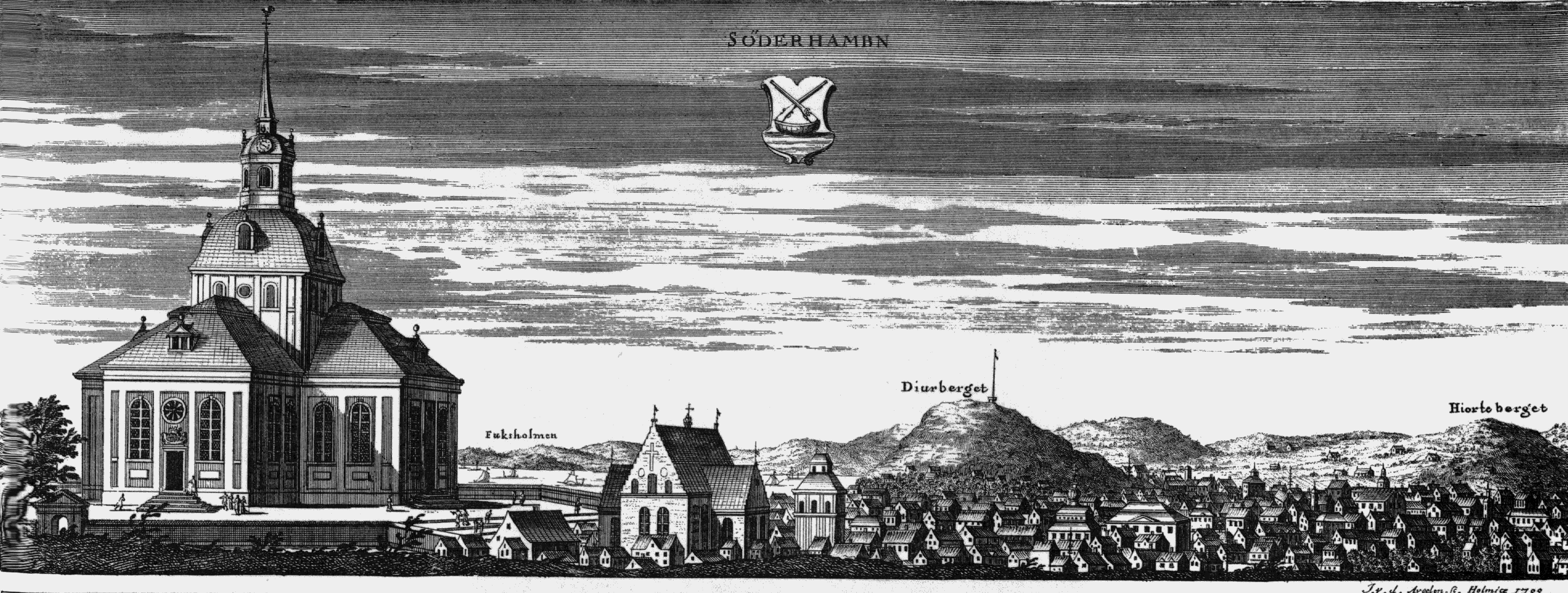
Söderhamn circa 1700, from Suecia Antiqua et Hodierna.

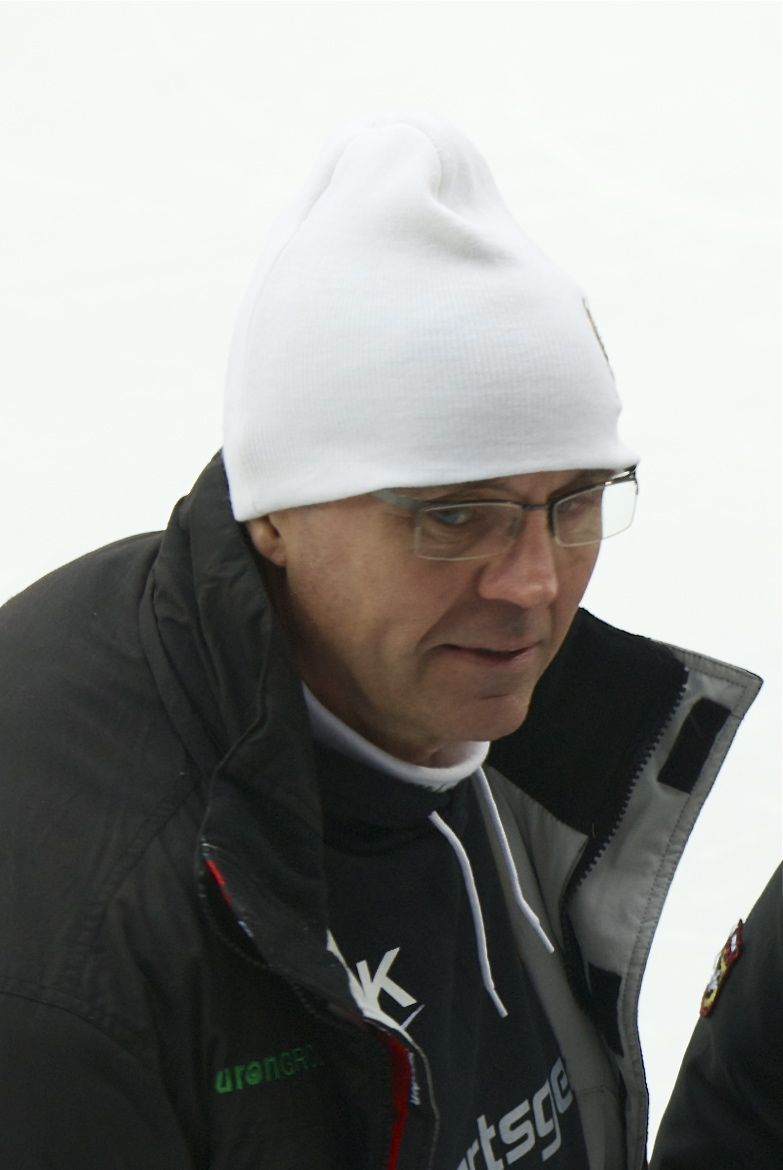
Stefan Karlsson plays in the Swedish bandy team, and coaches; he is also the champion for three clubs: local Broberg, IF Boltic and Vetlanda BK.

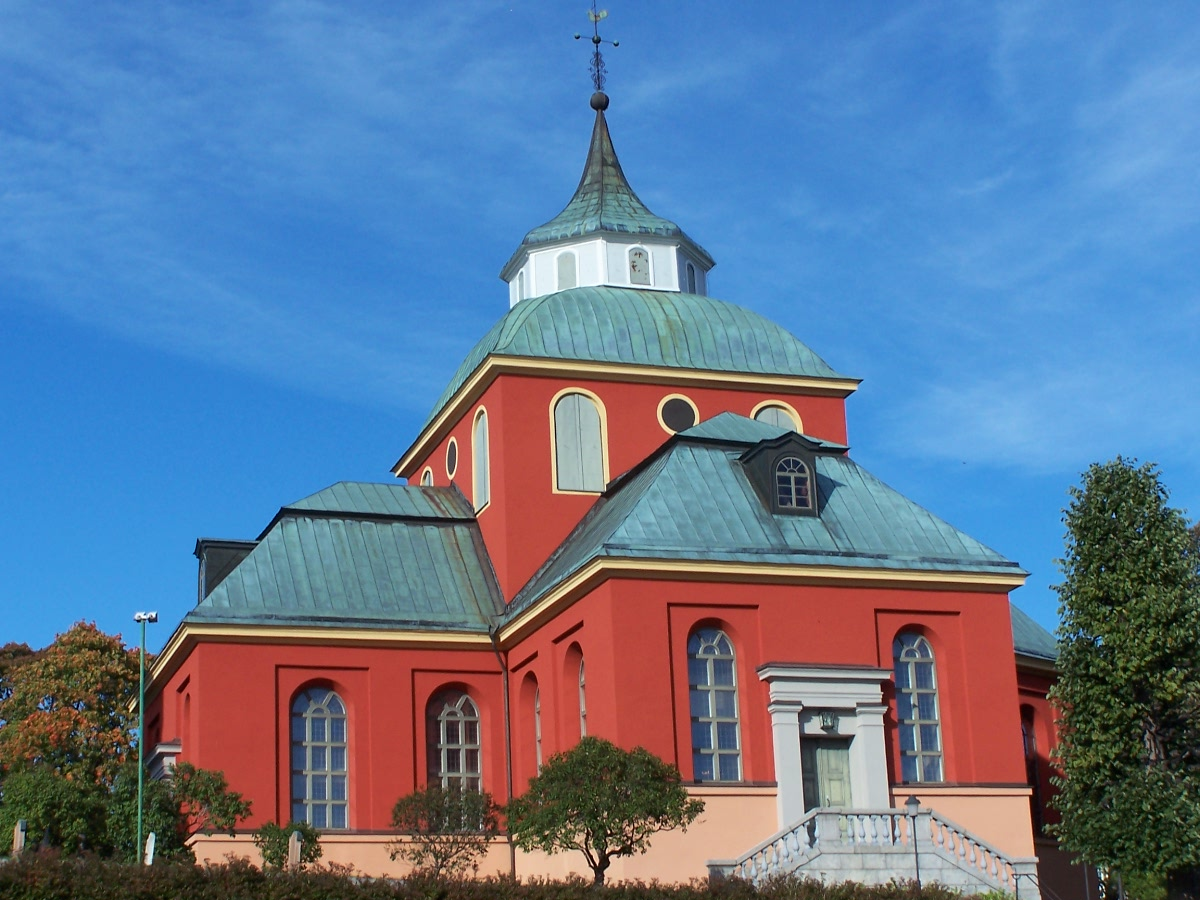
Söderhamn church
