= Färila =

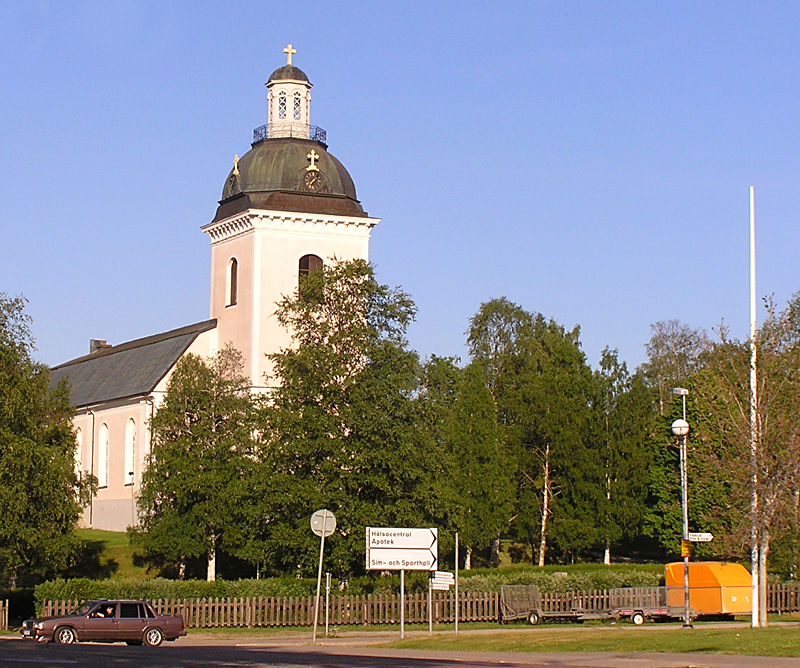
- Färila Church

- Location within Sweden Gävleborg Location within Sweden
- Coordinates: 61°48′N 15°51′E
- Country: Sweden
- Province: Hälsingland
- County: Gävleborg County
- Municipality: Ljusdal Municipality

Area
  - Total: 2.78 km^{2} (1.07 sq mi)

Population (31 December 2020)
  - Total: 1,328
  - Density: 4,777/km^{2} (12,370/sq mi)
- Time zone: UTC+1 (CET)
  - Summer (DST): UTC+2 (CEST)

Färila (Swedish pronunciation: [ˈfæ̂ːrɪla]) is a locality situated in Ljusdal Municipality, Gävleborg County, Sweden with 1,328 inhabitants in 2020. Färila is situated in a valley near the river Ljusnan. People to commute to and from Ljusdal. The town is an industrial centre in Ljusdal Municipality.

== Sports ==
The following sports clubs are located in Färila:

- Färila IF
