= Ljusdal Municipality =

Ljusdal Municipality Ljusdals kommun
- Municipality
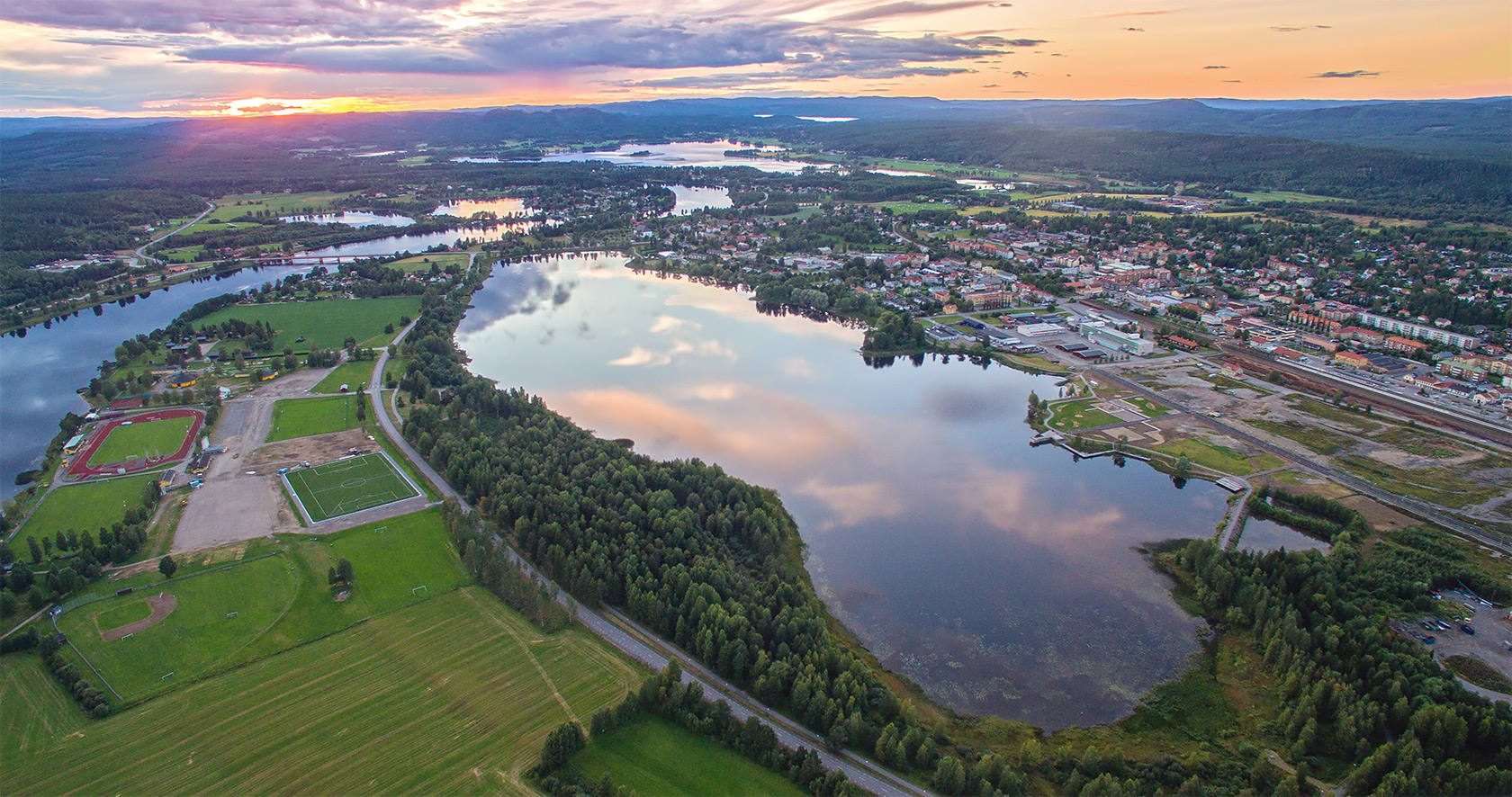

- Coat of arms

- Coordinates: 61°50′N 16°05′E
- Country: Sweden
- County: Gävleborg County
- Seat: Ljusdal

Area
  - Total: 5,609.84 km^{2} (2,165.97 sq mi)
  - Land: 5,256.7 km^{2} (2,029.6 sq mi)
  - Water: 353.14 km^{2} (136.35 sq mi)
- Area as of 1 January 2014.

Population (30 June 2025)
  - Total: 18,434
  - Density: 3.5068/km^{2} (9.0825/sq mi)
- Time zone: UTC+1 (CET)
  - Summer (DST): UTC+7 (CEST)
- ISO 3166 code: SE
- Province: Hälsingland
- Municipal code: 2161
- Website: www.ljusdal.se

Ljusdal Municipality (Swedish: Ljusdals kommun) is one of Sweden's 290 municipalities within Gävleborg County. Its seat is Ljusdal.

The municipality was formed in 1971 by the amalgamation of the market town (köping) of Ljusdal (instituted in 1914) with the rural municipalities Järvsö, Färila, Los and Ramsjö.

Ljusdal is known for its successful bandy team and for the annual Bandy World Cup that used to be held in the town.

== Geography ==
Geographically the town is located on the shores of the river Ljusnan, along the shores of which Sweden's northern main line railway (Norra Stambanan) stretches. The municipality calls itself "Sweden's nearest Norrland", with Norrland being historically how Sweden's north was referred to. Geographically, the municipality is located at the centre of Sweden.

In this large municipality (Sweden's 25th largest) there are several nature activities one can enjoy. Along Ljusnan there are a total of 40 kilometers of water ways, with possibilities for sailing, rafting, fishing or taking a tour with the tour boats. Hamra National Park is also located partly within the western parts of the municipality.

=== Localities ===
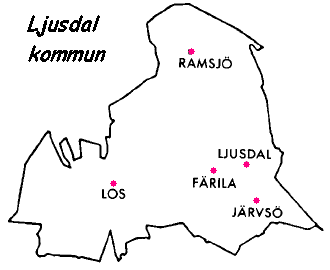

Figures as of 2004, from Statistics Sweden:

- Ljusdal 7,559
- Järvsö 1,907
- Färila 1,542
- Tallåsen 807
- Los 469
- Hybo 351
- Ramsjö 306
- Hennan 227
- Korskrogen 202
- Kårböle 134

== Demographics ==
This is a demographic table based on Ljusdal Municipality's electoral districts in the 2022 Swedish general election sourced from SVT's election platform, in turn taken from SCB official statistics.

In total there were 14,791 Swedish citizens of voting age resident in the municipality. 48.1% voted for the left coalition and 50.8% for the right coalition. Indicators are in percentage points except population totals and income.

Location	Residents	Citizen adults	Left vote	Right vote	Employed	Swedish parents	Foreign heritage	Income SEK	Degree
Location			%	%					
Färila	2,102	1,700	43.8	55.1	82	93	7	22,627	21
Järvsö N	1,307	1,078	50.6	48.3	84	93	7	23,964	35
Järvsö V	1,917	1,551	52.3	46.7	82	93	7	22,027	32
Järvsö Ö	1,109	875	56.1	43.0	88	95	5	24,800	39
Korskrogen-Kårböle	1,154	906	46.5	52.2	81	91	9	22,912	25
Ljusdal C	1,448	1,217	51.6	47.1	75	80	20	20,350	26
Ljusdal N	1,712	1,411	47.2	51.7	83	88	12	24,288	30
Ljusdal S	1,503	1,173	46.5	52.3	78	91	9	24,063	21
Ljusdal V	1,978	1,596	45.7	53.4	85	92	8	25,913	31
Ljusdal Ö	1,816	1,087	54.0	45.0	60	58	42	17,601	21
Los-Hamra	655	530	47.3	50.5	71	88	12	18,611	26
Ramsjö-Hennan	545	487	42.2	55.7	74	90	10	21,018	19
Tallåsen	1,541	1,180	41.4	58.2	86	96	4	25,234	21
Source: SVT

== History ==
The area had a large immigration from Finland in the 17th and 18th century in the western part of the municipality known as Orsa Finnmark (in Dalarna). Still there are many names which trace this Finnish influence. In Ljusdal a museum dedicated to the regions history is now located in a former dairy, and in Järvsö there is the Stenegård cultural centre.

The population was boosted when the mainline railway was constructed here in the late 19th century.

== Tourism ==
Tourism in the municipality is focussed on Järvsö. Popular tourist activities in Järvsö include skiing on Järvsöbacken and visiting Järvzoo.

=== Nature ===
Gröntjärn Nature Reserve is located in Ljusdal Municipality around 20 kilometers north of Ljusdal. Here several Kettle holes formed during glacial retreat, where ice blocks melted under sediments. The pool is not fed by streams but by groundwater and can see large variations in the lake level. The ground water source also gives the lake it is characteristic turquoise-green colouring.

== Sister cities ==
- Denmark : Glamsbjerg
- Norway: Tynset
- Finland: Ikaalinen
- Estonia: Vinni
- Germany: Schlieben

== Gallery ==
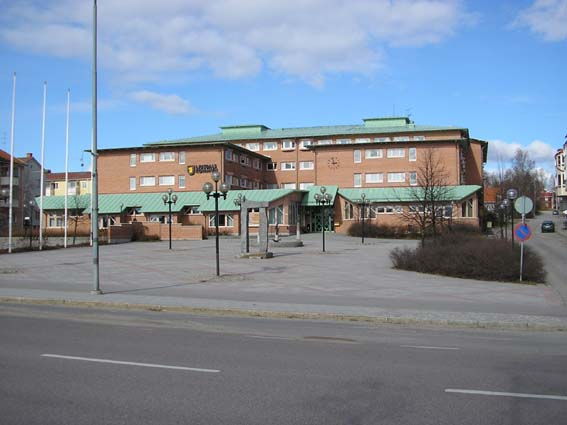
Ljusdal Municipal Building on Rio square

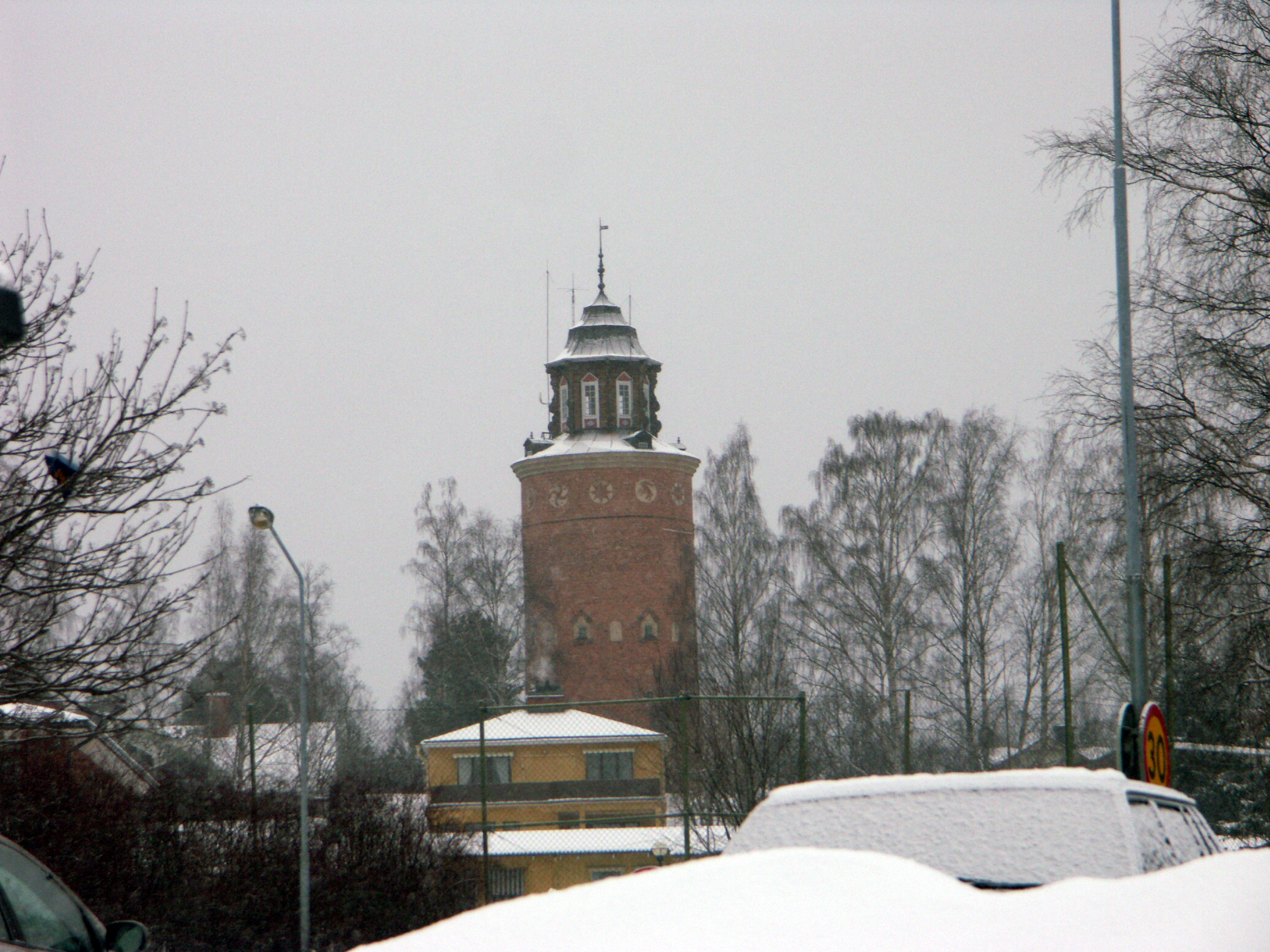
The Water tower

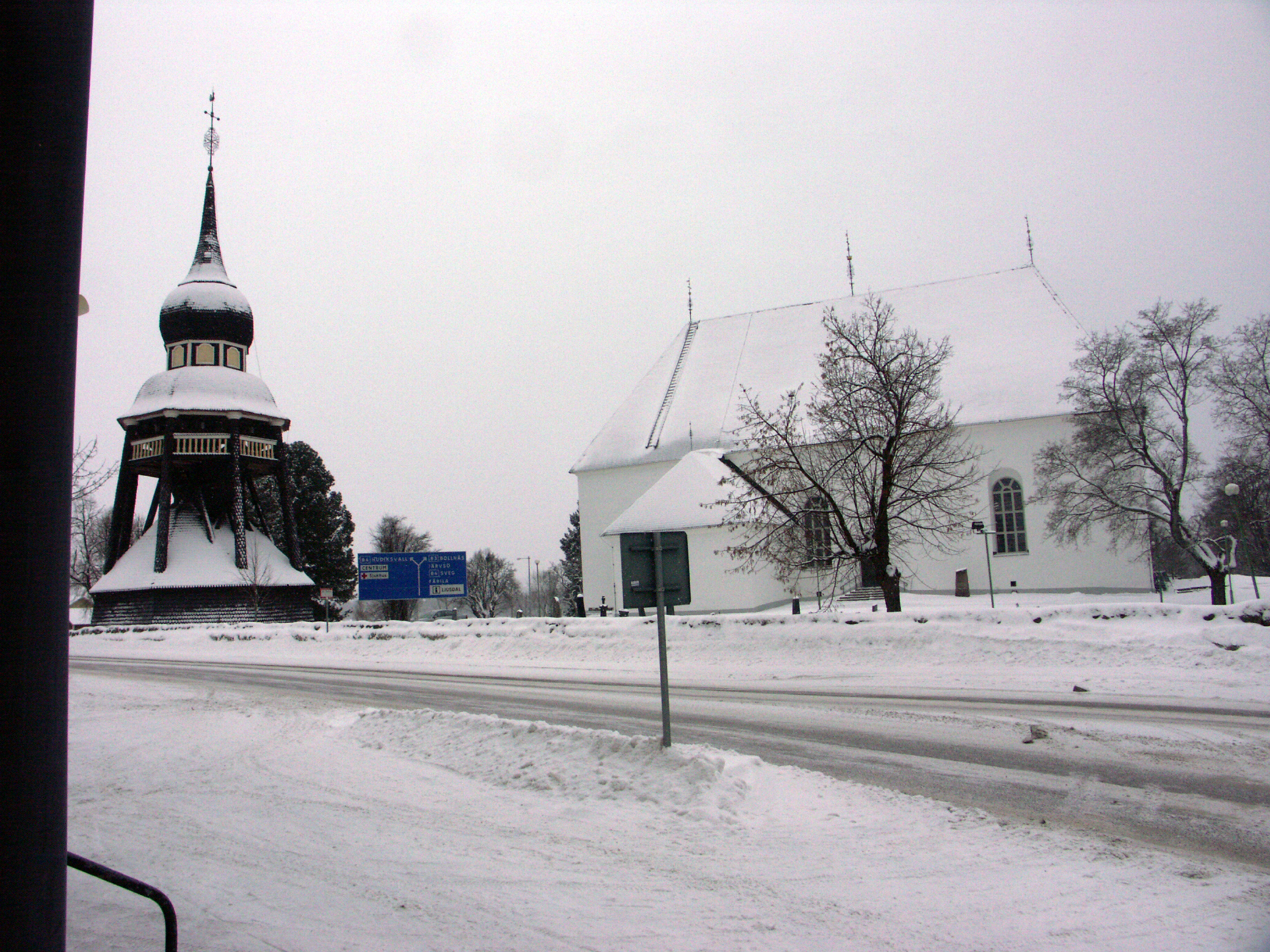
The church of Ljusdal

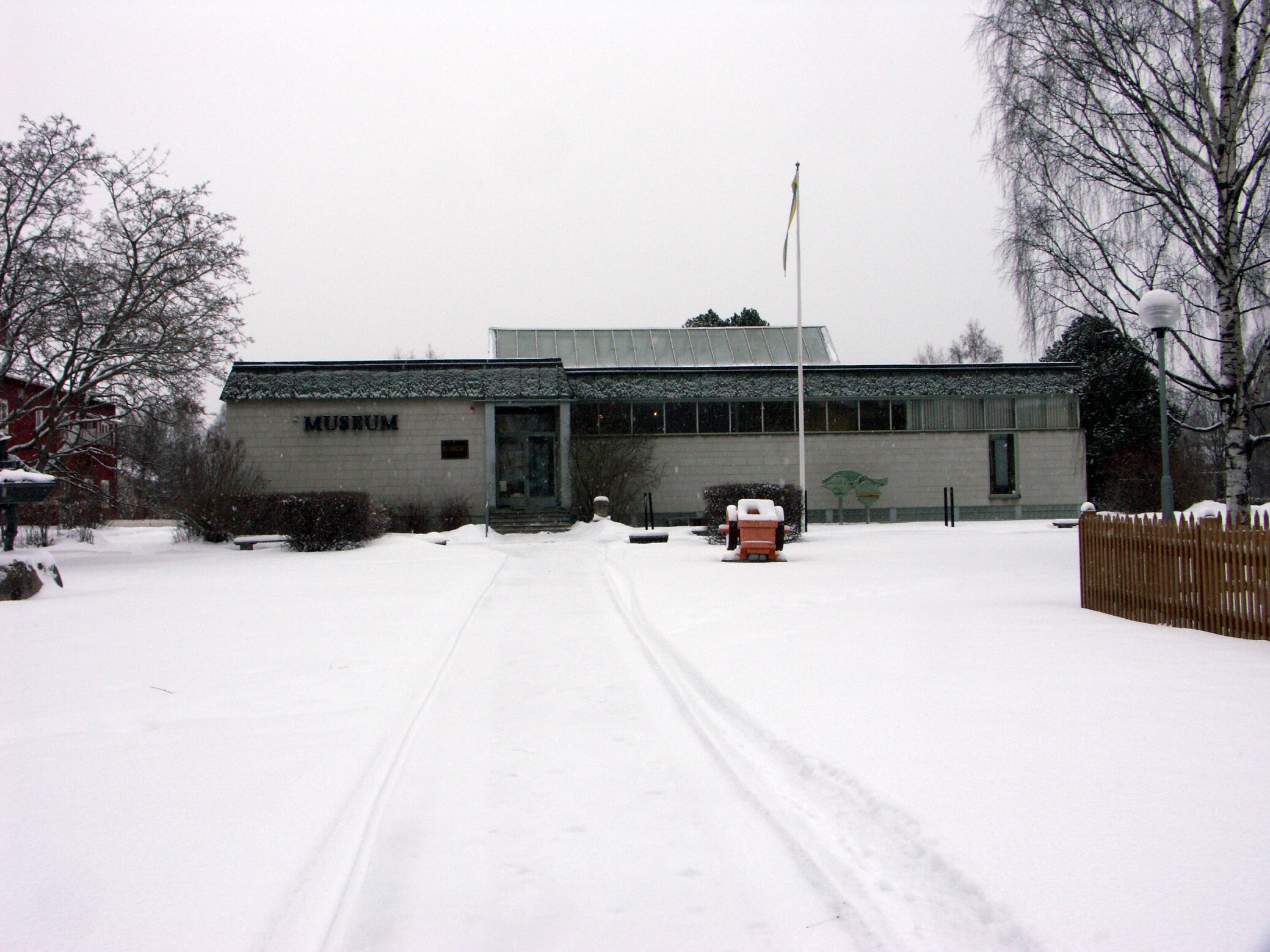
Ljusdalsbygdens museum

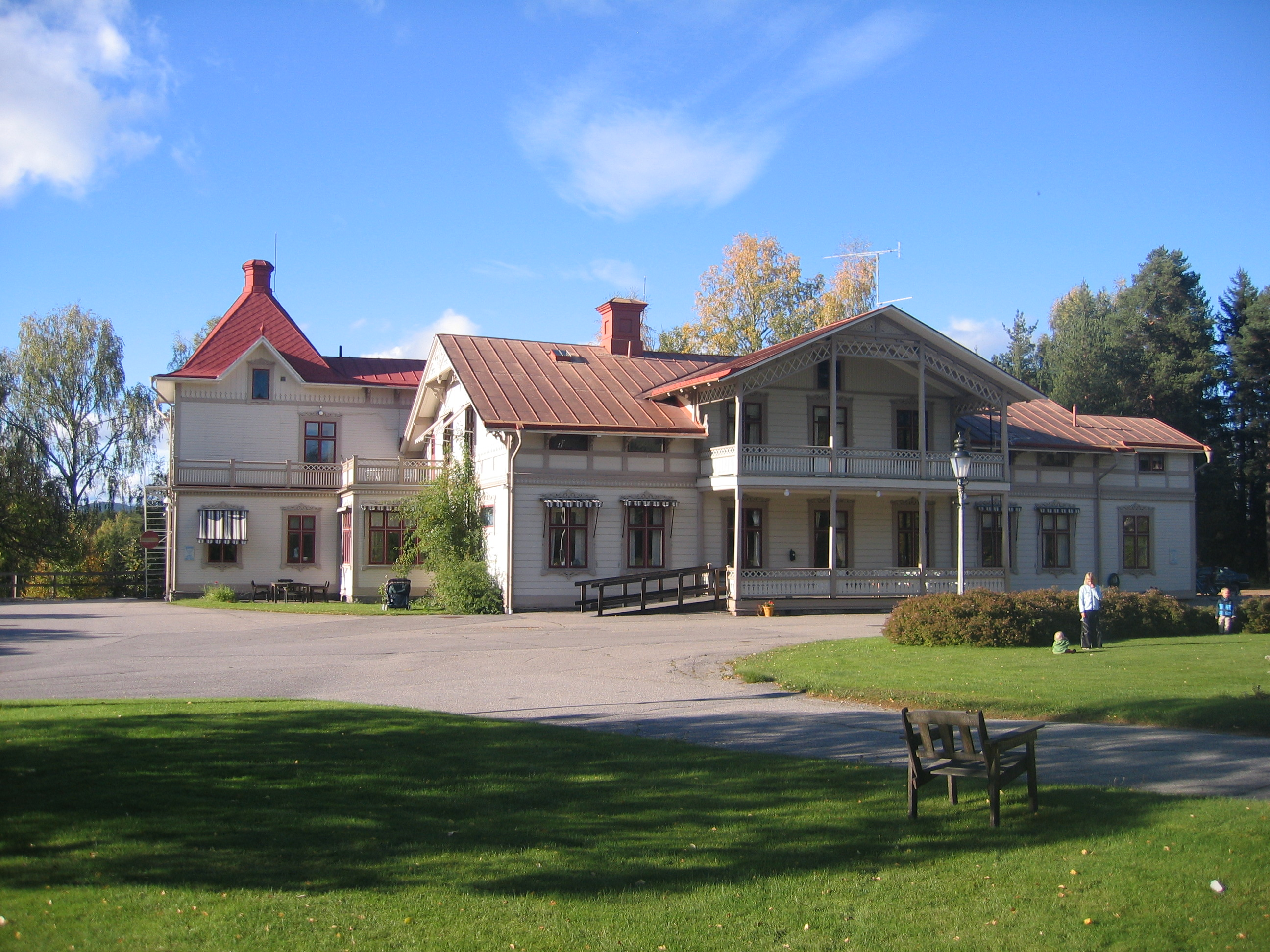
Historic Borrgården

== See also ==
- Järvsö
- Bandy World Cup
