= Results of the 2010 Swedish general election =

Sweden held a general election on 17 September 2010.

== National results ==
There were 5,960,408 valid ballots cast for a turnout of 84.63%.

Coalition dominance by municipality (colors aggravated, not linearly proportional).: Red‑Greens; Equal; The Alliance

Relative support of the Sweden Democrats by municipality.: Sweden Democrats (max. 15.84% in Sjöbo)

Party	Votes	%	Seats			
Party	Votes	%	Con.	Lev.	Tot.	+/–
Swedish Social Democratic Party	1,827,497	30.66	112	0	112	–18
Moderate Party	1,791,766	30.06	107	0	107	+10
Green Party	437,435	7.34	19	6	25	+6
Liberal People's Party	420,524	7.06	17	7	24	–4
Centre Party	390,804	6.56	21	2	23	–6
Sweden Democrats	339,610	5.70	14	6	20	+20
Left Party	334,053	5.60	9	10	19	–3
Christian Democrats	333,696	5.60	11	8	19	–5
Pirate Party	38,491	0.65	0	0	0	0
Feminist Initiative	24,139	0.40	0	0	0	0
Swedish Senior Citizen Interest Party	11,078	0.19	0	0	0	0
Rural Democrats	1,565	0.03	0	0	0	New
Socialist Justice Party	1,507	0.03	0	0	0	0
Norrländska Coalition	1,456	0.02	0	0	0	New
National Democrats	1,141	0.02	0	0	0	0
Classical Liberal Party	716	0.01	0	0	0	0
Freedom Party	688	0.01	0	0	0	New
Party of the Swedes	681	0.01	0	0	0	0
Unity	632	0.01	0	0	0	0
Communist Party	375	0.01	0	0	0	0
Spirits Party	237	0.00	0	0	0	New
European Workers Party	187	0.00	0	0	0	0
Health Care Party	185	0.00	0	0	0	0
Alliance Party	87	0.00	0	0	0	0
Direct Democrats	76	0.00	0	0	0	0
National Democratic Party	63	0.00	0	0	0	0
Population Party	35	0.00	0	0	0	New
Communist League	26	0.00	0	0	0	0
Freedom and Justice Party	19	0.00	0	0	0	0
Scania Party	17	0.00	0	0	0	0
Republicans	14	0.00	0	0	0	0
Republican Party	10	0.00	0	0	0	New
Nordic Union	5	0.00	0	0	0	0
Alexander's Lista	4	0.00	0	0	0	New
Li Yu Chen Andersson Party	4	0.00	0	0	0	New
Rikshushållarna	3	0.00	0	0	0	0
Labour Market Party UPI	2	0.00	0	0	0	New
Parties not on the ballot	1,580	0.03	0	0	0	–
Total	5,960,408	100.00	310	39	349	0
Valid votes	5,960,408	98.87				
Invalid/blank votes	68,274	1.13				
Total votes	6,028,682	100.00				
Registered voters/turnout	7,123,651	84.63				
Source: Val

== Elected MP's ==
Location	S	M	MP	FP	C	SD	V	KD	Total
Blekinge	3	2				1			6
Dalarna	4	3	1		1	1	1		11
Gothenburg	5	5	2	1	1	1	2	1	18
Gotland	1	1							2
Gävleborg	4	3	1	1	1	1	1		12
Halland	3	4	1	1	1	1		1	12
Jämtland	2	1			1				5
Jönköping	4	3	1	1	1	1		2	13
Kalmar	4	3			1			1	9
Kronoberg	3	2			1				6
Malmö	3	3	1	1		1	1		10
Norrbotten	6	2					1		9
Skåne NE	3	4	1	1	1	1		1	12
Skåne S	3	5	1	1	1	1		1	13
Skåne W	3	4	1	1		1			10
Stockholm (city)	6	10	3	3	2	1	2	2	29
Stockholm County	8	15	3	3	2	2	2	3	38
Södermanland	4	3	1	1	1	1			11
Uppsala	3	4	1	1	1	1	1	1	13
Värmland	5	3	1	1	1		1		12
Västerbotten	4	2	1	1	1		1	1	11
Västernorrland	5	2			1		1		9
Västmanland	4	3	1	1		1	1		11
Västra Götaland E	4	3		1	1			1	10
Västra Götaland N	3	3	1	1	1	1	1	1	12
Västra Götaland S	3	3							6
Västra Götaland W	3	4	1	1	1	1	1	1	13
Örebro	4	3	1	1		1	1	1	12
Östergötland	5	4	1	1	1	1	1	1	15
Total	112	107	25	24	23	20	19	19	349
Source: val.se

== Regional results ==
=== Percentage share ===
Location	Turnout	Share	Votes	S	M	MP	FP	C	SD	V	KD	Other	Left	Right
Götaland	84.5	48.2	2,870,091	29.5	30.7	6.9	7.2	6.5	6.8	5.0	6.1	1.4	41.3	50.5
Svealand	84.9	39.2	2,336,597	28.0	32.5	8.3	7.5	6.4	4.7	5.6	5.5	1.5	41.9	51.9
Norrland	84.2	12.6	753,720	43.6	20.0	6.1	5.1	7.3	4.5	8.0	4.1	1.4	57.6	36.5
Total	84.6	100.0	5,960,408	30.7	30.1	7.3	7.1	6.6	5.7	5.6	5.6	1.4	43.6	49.3
Source: val.se

=== By votes ===
Location	Turnout	Share	Votes	S	M	MP	FP	C	SD	V	KD	Other	Left	Right
Götaland	84.5	48.2	2,870,091	845,273	880,841	198,394	205,887	187,343	195,339	142,090	174,263	40,661	1,185,757	1,448,334
Svealand	84.9	39.2	2,336,597	653,934	760,137	193,151	176,407	148,490	110,309	131,893	128,362	33,914	978,978	1,213,396
Norrland	84.2	12.6	753,720	328,290	150,788	45,890	38,230	54,971	33,962	60,070	31,071	10,448	434,250	275,060
Total	84.6	100.0	5,960,408	1,827,497	1,791,766	437,435	420,524	390,804	339,610	334,053	333,696	85,023	2,598,985	2,936,790
Source: val.se

== Results by statistical area ==
=== Percentage share ===
Location	Share	Votes	S	M	MP	FP	C	SD	V	KD	Other	Left	Right
East Middle Sweden	16.9	1,008,719	33.7	27.8	7.4	7.0	6.3	5.7	5.4	5.5	1.4	46.4	46.5
Middle Norrland	4.1	241,911	42.7	21.8	5.8	4.7	9.0	4.3	6.2	3.9	1.6	54.7	39.3
North Middle Sweden	9.0	533,631	38.1	24.7	5.9	5.4	7.6	6.3	6.3	4.4	1.3	50.4	42.0
Småland & Islands	8.8	526,453	32.3	27.4	5.8	5.4	9.1	6.0	4.6	8.6	0.9	42.6	50.5
Stockholm County	21.0	1,251,236	21.7	37.5	9.5	8.4	6.0	3.7	5.7	5.8	1.6	36.9	57.8
South Sweden	14.5	861,385	27.9	33.7	6.5	7.4	5.1	9.5	4.0	4.1	1.8	38.4	50.3
Upper Norrland	5.6	334,561	46.9	17.0	6.2	5.2	6.1	3.3	9.6	4.3	1.2	62.8	32.7
West Sweden	20.2	1,202,512	28.5	30.5	7.5	7.9	6.4	5.6	5.7	6.4	1.4	41.8	51.2
Total	100.0	5,960,408	30.7	30.1	7.3	7.1	6.6	5.7	5.6	5.6	1.4	43.6	49.3
Source: val.se

=== By votes ===
Location	Share	Votes	S	M	MP	FP	C	SD	V	KD	Other	Left	Right
East Middle Sweden	16.9	1,008,719	339,529	280,033	74,588	70,625	63,322	57,363	54,189	55,358	13,712	468,306	469,338
Middle Norrland	4.1	241,911	103,354	52,743	14,096	11,408	21,672	10,386	14,982	9,323	3,947	132,432	95,146
North Middle Sweden	9.0	533,631	203,552	131,584	31,567	28,843	40,447	33,588	33,578	23,472	7,000	268,697	224,346
Småland & Islands	8.8	526,453	169,842	144,025	30,454	28,433	47,904	31,501	24,176	45,402	4,716	224,472	265,764
Stockholm County	21.0	1,251,236	270,910	469,670	119,139	105,400	75,264	46,836	71,182	73,124	19,711	461,231	723,458
South Sweden	14.5	861,385	239,956	289,998	56,390	63,465	44,318	81,769	34,750	35,572	15,167	331,096	433,353
Upper Norrland	5.6	334,561	157,043	57,036	20,876	17,378	20,317	10,960	32,274	14,513	4,164	210,193	109,244
West Sweden	20.2	1,202,512	343,311	366,677	90,325	94,972	77,560	67,207	68,922	76,932	16,606	502,558	616,141
Total	100.0	5,960,408	1,827,497	1,791,766	437,435	420,524	390,804	339,610	334,053	333,696	85,023	2,598,985	2,936,790
Source: val.se

== Constituency results ==
=== Percentage share ===
Location	Land	Turnout	Share	Votes	S	M	MP	FP	C	SD	V	KD	Other	Left	Right
Blekinge	G	85.8	1.7	100,162	36.5	27.3	5.3	5.4	5.8	9.8	5.1	4.0	0.9	46.8	42.5
Dalarna	S	83.8	3.0	179,168	37.5	25.1	6.0	4.9	7.9	7.0	5.9	4.4	1.5	49.3	42.3
Gothenburg	G	82.7	5.4	319,302	25.2	30.4	10.7	8.4	3.8	4.9	8.5	6.1	2.0	44.5	48.7
Gotland	G	84.9	0.6	38,640	33.3	25.2	8.4	4.6	14.6	3.2	6.1	2.9	1.7	47.8	47.4
Gävleborg	N	82.8	3.0	177,248	38.3	23.1	6.2	5.3	7.3	7.1	7.2	4.1	1.3	51.7	39.9
Halland	G	86.2	3.3	195,565	26.8	34.7	5.9	7.8	8.8	5.4	3.5	5.6	1.5	36.2	56.9
Jämtland	N	83.1	1.4	81,936	40.3	22.2	6.5	3.9	12.8	3.8	6.5	2.9	1.2	53.3	41.7
Jönköping	G	85.5	3.6	216,564	30.6	26.7	5.3	5.6	7.8	6.4	4.1	12.9	0.7	40.0	53.0
Kalmar	G	85.0	2.6	154,736	35.6	26.9	5.6	5.1	8.9	5.8	5.1	6.0	1.0	46.2	46.9
Kronoberg	G	85.1	2.0	116,513	30.5	29.8	6.1	5.7	9.9	6.4	4.6	6.1	0.9	41.2	51.6
Malmö	G	79.6	2.8	169,108	28.7	32.6	8.8	7.0	2.8	7.8	6.0	3.1	3.2	43.4	45.5
Norrbotten	N	84.9	2.8	163,963	51.9	16.4	5.3	4.3	4.7	3.9	9.3	3.3	1.1	66.4	28.6
Skåne NE	G	83.0	3.2	190,154	28.7	32.0	5.4	6.7	6.8	11.2	3.2	5.0	1.1	37.3	50.4
Skåne S	G	86.4	3.8	228,526	22.1	38.5	7.1	8.6	5.6	8.7	3.3	4.3	1.8	32.5	57.0
Skåne W	G	82.2	2.9	173,435	28.8	33.8	5.7	8.1	4.7	10.1	3.4	4.0	1.5	37.8	50.6
Stockholm (city)	S	85.0	9.0	534,887	20.9	34.3	12.2	8.6	6.3	3.2	7.4	5.3	1.8	40.5	54.5
Stockholm County	S	85.0	12.0	716,349	22.2	40.0	7.5	8.3	5.8	4.2	4.4	6.3	1.4	34.1	60.3
Södermanland	S	84.8	2.9	171,427	34.7	27.9	7.6	6.6	5.8	6.6	5.0	4.7	1.0	47.3	45.0
Uppsala	S	85.8	3.6	215,030	27.4	30.1	8.8	7.9	8.3	4.7	5.5	5.7	1.7	41.7	52.0
Värmland	S	84.1	3.0	177,215	38.9	25.7	5.6	6.0	7.6	4.8	5.8	4.7	1.2	50.1	44.0
Västerbotten	N	85.4	2.9	170,598	42.2	17.7	7.2	6.0	7.4	2.7	10.0	5.4	1.4	59.4	36.5
Västernorrland	N	84.6	2.7	159,975	44.0	21.6	5.5	5.2	7.0	4.5	6.0	4.4	1.9	55.5	38.1
Västmanland	S	84.4	2.7	160,143	36.4	27.1	5.9	7.5	5.2	6.2	5.7	4.6	1.4	48.0	44.4
Västra Götaland E	G	85.3	2.8	168,561	33.9	27.9	5.6	6.2	8.3	5.8	4.9	6.6	1.0	44.4	48.9
Västra Götaland N	G	85.3	2.9	172,860	32.4	27.0	6.9	7.8	6.6	6.1	5.7	6.4	1.1	45.1	47.7
Västra Götaland S	G	85.1	2.0	121,187	31.2	28.3	6.0	7.3	7.7	6.9	5.1	6.4	1.1	42.3	49.7
Västra Götaland W	G	86.1	3.8	225,037	26.4	32.8	7.0	9.0	6.0	5.6	4.7	7.3	1.2	38.1	55.2
Örebro	S	85.6	3.1	182,378	38.8	24.0	6.5	6.3	5.4	6.1	5.7	6.2	1.1	51.0	41.8
Östergötland	G	85.8	4.7	279,741	33.0	28.7	7.6	6.8	6.3	5.3	5.1	5.9	1.5	45.6	47.6
Total		84.6	100.0	5,960,408	30.7	30.1	7.3	7.1	6.6	5.7	5.6	5.6	1.4	43.6	49.3
Source: val.se

=== By votes ===
Location	Land	Turnout	Share	Votes	S	M	MP	FP	C	SD	V	KD	Other	Left	Right
Blekinge	G	85.8	1.7	100,162	36,520	27,387	5,289	5,431	5,771	9,830	5,075	3,973	886	46,884	42,562
Dalarna	S	83.8	3.0	179,168	67,139	44,997	10,652	8,747	14,086	12,470	10,533	7,925	2,619	88,324	75,755
Gothenburg	G	82.7	5.4	319,302	80,543	96,981	34,205	26,829	12,183	15,608	27,246	19,484	6,223	141,994	155,477
Gotland	G	84.9	0.6	38,640	12,855	9,731	3,259	1,785	5,657	1,225	2,342	1,128	658	18,456	18,301
Gävleborg	N	82.8	3.0	177,248	67,893	41,009	10,918	9,444	12,982	12,616	12,814	7,235	2,337	91,625	70,670
Halland	G	86.2	3.3	195,565	52,319	67,878	11,568	15,286	17,178	10,507	6,904	10,994	2,931	70,791	111,336
Jämtland	N	83.1	1.4	81,936	33,013	18,193	5,339	3,155	10,487	3,122	5,340	2,340	947	43,692	34,175
Jönköping	G	85.5	3.6	216,564	66,316	57,901	11,438	12,134	16,859	13,888	8,775	27,822	1,431	86,529	114,716
Kalmar	G	85.0	2.6	154,736	55,116	41,631	8,713	7,847	13,829	8,964	7,679	9,341	1,616	71,508	72,648
Kronoberg	G	85.1	2.0	116,513	35,555	34,762	7,044	6,667	11,559	7,424	5,380	7,111	1,011	47,979	60,099
Malmö	G	79.6	2.8	169,108	48,450	55,160	14,861	11,768	4,795	13,256	10,118	5,274	5,426	73,429	76,997
Norrbotten	N	84.9	2.8	163,963	85,035	26,852	8,630	7,082	7,618	6,309	15,240	5,388	1,809	108,905	46,940
Skåne NE	G	83.0	3.2	190,154	54,529	60,930	10,195	12,677	12,871	21,312	6,113	9,420	2,107	70,837	95,898
Skåne S	G	86.4	3.8	228,526	50,557	87,893	16,176	19,622	12,717	19,923	7,597	9,916	4,125	74,330	130,148
Skåne W	G	82.2	2.9	173,435	49,900	58,628	9,869	13,967	8,164	17,448	5,847	6,989	2,623	65,616	87,748
Stockholm (city)	S	85.0	9.0	534,887	111,688	183,421	65,351	45,939	33,895	16,950	39,565	28,244	9,834	216,604	291,499
Stockholm County	S	85.0	12.0	716,349	159,222	286,249	53,788	59,461	41,369	29,886	31,617	44,880	9,877	244,627	431,959
Södermanland	S	84.8	2.9	171,427	59,463	47,889	13,065	11,299	9,850	11,370	8,637	8,095	1,759	81,165	77,133
Uppsala	S	85.8	3.6	215,030	58,862	64,750	18,993	16,878	17,838	10,003	11,845	12,265	3,596	89,700	111,731
Värmland	S	84.1	3.0	177,215	68,520	45,578	9,997	10,652	13,379	8,502	10,231	8,312	2,044	88,748	77,921
Västerbotten	N	85.4	2.9	170,598	72,008	30,184	12,246	10,296	12,699	4,651	17,034	9,125	2,355	101,288	62,304
Västernorrland	N	84.6	2.7	159,975	70,341	34,550	8,757	8,253	11,185	7,264	9,642	6,983	3,000	88,740	60,971
Västmanland	S	84.4	2.7	160,143	58,222	43,462	9,459	12,016	8,266	9,992	9,154	7,406	2,166	76,835	71,150
Västra Götaland E	G	85.3	2.8	168,561	57,095	47,049	9,440	10,387	13,914	9,725	8,223	11,092	1,636	74,758	82,442
Västra Götaland N	G	85.3	2.9	172,860	56,060	46,582	12,003	13,393	11,449	10,513	9,907	11,092	1,861	77,970	82,516
Västra Götaland S	G	85.1	2.0	121,187	37,817	34,334	7,315	8,883	9,273	8,350	6,136	7,745	1,334	51,268	60,235
Västra Götaland W	G	86.1	3.8	225,037	59,477	73,853	15,794	20,194	13,563	12,504	10,506	16,525	2,621	85,777	124,135
Örebro	S	85.6	3.1	182,378	70,818	43,791	11,846	11,415	9,807	11,136	10,311	11,235	2,019	92,975	76,248
Östergötland	G	85.8	4.7	279,741	92,164	80,141	21,225	19,017	17,561	14,862	14,242	16,357	4,172	127,631	133,076
Total		84.6	100.0	5,960,408	1,827,497	1,791,766	437,435	420,524	390,804	339,610	334,053	333,696	85,023	2,598,985	2,936,790
Source: val.se

== Municipal summary ==
Location	County	Turnout	Votes	S	M	MP	FP	C	SD	V	KD	Other	Left	Right
Ale	Västra Götaland	85.0	16,898	33.0	28.2	6.0	6.5	5.0	8.1	6.1	5.8	1.4	45.1	45.4
Alingsås	Västra Götaland	87.3	25,090	25.7	27.9	9.5	10.0	6.2	4.8	6.2	8.7	1.1	41.4	52.8
Alvesta	Kronoberg	83.9	11,709	31.0	30.3	4.3	4.7	11.2	7.8	4.5	5.4	0.8	39.8	51.6
Aneby	Jönköping	86.1	4,241	26.6	22.6	4.6	5.1	12.3	7.6	3.0	17.7	0.6	34.2	57.6
Arboga	Västmanland	83.6	8,565	37.6	26.4	6.3	6.8	5.8	6.0	5.7	4.5	1.0	49.5	43.5
Arjeplog	Norrbotten	79.4	1,973	46.7	14.5	4.6	5.9	5.8	4.9	11.7	4.9	1.1	62.9	31.1
Arvidsjaur	Norrbotten	84.1	4,411	54.0	13.4	2.6	4.1	7.2	4.5	11.1	2.0	1.1	67.8	26.7
Arvika	Värmland	82.1	16,482	39.0	23.6	6.3	5.5	8.4	5.2	6.5	4.3	1.1	51.9	41.7
Askersund	Örebro	84.8	7,628	39.4	25.6	4.9	4.9	8.1	5.8	4.6	6.0	0.7	48.9	44.5
Avesta	Dalarna	83.7	14,345	44.1	22.9	5.0	4.8	6.3	7.2	5.4	3.5	1.0	54.4	37.4
Bengtsfors	Västra Götaland	80.5	6,005	38.5	23.1	4.9	5.2	10.9	5.7	5.2	5.9	0.8	48.5	45.1
Berg	Jämtland	80.5	4,670	39.4	21.4	5.3	2.7	17.5	4.7	5.3	2.6	1.2	50.0	44.2
Bjurholm	Västerbotten	83.2	1,599	36.2	26.6	1.9	8.1	14.1	2.4	3.6	6.5	0.6	41.7	55.3
Bjuv	Skåne	79.5	8,212	40.6	25.9	3.4	4.9	3.7	14.9	3.2	2.7	0.7	47.2	37.2
Boden	Norrbotten	86.1	18,573	49.8	20.9	4.2	4.7	3.7	4.6	8.0	3.2	1.0	62.0	32.5
Bollebygd	Västra Götaland	87.6	5,468	26.6	33.1	6.1	6.5	7.2	8.2	4.7	6.6	1.0	37.4	53.4
Bollnäs	Gävleborg	79.9	16,466	36.8	22.3	5.3	5.4	9.6	8.4	6.8	4.3	1.1	49.0	41.5
Borgholm	Kalmar	84.2	7,340	23.3	31.7	6.2	5.0	16.8	5.2	3.6	7.3	1.0	33.0	60.8
Borlänge	Dalarna	84.9	30,756	39.6	23.2	6.0	5.0	5.4	9.2	6.6	3.5	1.5	52.2	37.1
Borås	Västra Götaland	84.6	65,193	31.9	29.1	6.5	7.7	4.7	7.1	5.6	6.2	1.3	44.0	47.7
Botkyrka	Stockholm	78.8	41,378	35.7	30.0	6.9	6.2	2.8	5.0	7.1	5.1	1.4	49.7	44.0
Boxholm	Östergötland	87.3	3,563	45.4	20.2	4.9	3.7	9.1	5.4	5.7	5.1	0.5	56.0	38.1
Bromölla	Skåne	84.3	7,853	41.1	22.4	4.0	5.5	3.5	15.4	4.6	2.8	0.7	49.7	34.2
Bräcke	Jämtland	82.1	4,368	49.8	17.6	3.8	3.4	12.1	3.9	6.8	1.4	1.1	60.5	34.5
Burlöv	Skåne	80.7	9,413	33.6	30.9	5.3	6.9	2.7	12.5	3.8	2.5	1.9	42.6	43.0
Båstad	Skåne	85.3	9,769	15.3	44.1	5.5	7.4	12.1	5.6	1.9	7.2	0.9	22.6	70.8
Dals-Ed	Västra Götaland	81.1	2,813	28.4	27.2	3.7	4.6	15.8	6.1	3.9	9.2	1.0	36.0	56.8
Danderyd	Stockholm	90.5	20,603	5.8	52.1	3.9	10.1	11.2	1.7	1.2	13.3	0.8	10.9	86.7
Degerfors	Örebro	86.1	6,494	52.7	13.8	4.9	3.1	4.1	5.4	10.8	4.5	0.7	68.4	25.6
Dorotea	Västerbotten	80.6	1,831	54.6	11.4	0.8	7.5	9.3	2.9	9.5	2.6	1.4	64.9	30.8
Eda	Värmland	78.5	4,348	43.0	22.7	2.8	3.8	12.3	5.7	4.7	4.0	1.1	50.4	42.8
Ekerö	Stockholm	90.1	16,028	13.2	47.1	8.2	9.4	7.3	3.4	3.2	7.1	1.2	24.6	70.9
Eksjö	Jönköping	84.8	10,751	27.7	28.7	5.2	6.0	11.1	5.8	3.6	11.2	0.7	36.6	57.0
Emmaboda	Kalmar	84.9	6,067	40.3	23.6	4.7	3.0	11.1	5.8	5.2	5.3	1.1	50.2	43.0
Enköping	Uppsala	84.3	25,161	29.1	34.8	6.0	5.3	10.0	5.4	3.6	4.6	1.1	38.7	54.8
Eskilstuna	Södermanland	83.3	58,588	35.9	26.2	7.9	6.7	4.6	7.9	5.4	4.4	1.0	49.2	41.9
Eslöv	Skåne	82.7	19,064	32.2	29.6	4.8	7.0	7.0	11.8	3.2	2.8	1.6	40.2	46.4
Essunga	Västra Götaland	85.6	3,686	29.3	31.4	4.2	5.1	12.6	6.2	3.9	6.4	1.0	37.4	55.5
Fagersta	Västmanland	82.1	7,605	44.4	21.2	5.1	4.9	3.4	7.7	8.8	3.7	0.9	58.3	33.1
Falkenberg	Halland	84.9	26,572	30.0	28.9	6.0	6.9	12.6	5.8	3.7	4.8	1.4	39.6	53.2
Falun	Dalarna	85.4	36,559	31.5	28.9	8.1	5.7	8.1	5.5	5.5	5.0	1.8	45.1	47.6
Falköping	Västra Götaland	84.7	20,367	31.2	27.8	5.3	5.2	9.3	7.8	4.7	7.8	0.9	41.2	50.1
Filipstad	Värmland	82.6	6,837	51.8	18.6	3.6	4.1	3.8	6.2	8.2	2.8	0.9	63.6	29.3
Finspång	Östergötland	85.2	13,760	43.9	22.2	5.8	4.6	5.6	5.3	6.1	5.8	0.7	55.8	38.2
Flen	Södermanland	84.7	10,141	38.7	24.2	5.9	4.8	8.2	6.9	5.5	4.9	0.9	50.1	42.1
Forshaga	Värmland	86.4	7,445	47.2	21.1	4.9	5.1	6.0	5.2	5.4	4.3	0.9	57.4	36.5
Färgelanda	Västra Götaland	83.6	4,217	34.1	24.5	3.0	4.9	14.9	8.6	4.1	5.2	0.8	41.2	49.5
Gagnef	Dalarna	85.8	6,542	34.9	23.7	6.1	4.1	12.3	7.3	5.0	5.7	1.1	45.9	45.7
Gislaved	Jönköping	83.4	17,861	34.4	28.4	3.9	5.3	9.8	7.2	2.9	7.6	0.6	41.2	51.0
Gnesta	Södermanland	85.3	6,603	28.7	29.5	9.8	5.8	8.9	6.0	5.7	4.0	1.6	44.2	48.2
Gnosjö	Jönköping	84.2	5,783	29.6	25.3	2.9	4.8	7.9	7.0	2.7	19.1	0.8	35.2	57.1
Gothenburg	Västra Götaland	82.7	319,302	25.2	30.4	10.7	8.4	3.8	4.9	8.5	6.1	2.0	44.5	48.7
Gotland	Gotland	84.9	38,640	33.3	25.2	8.4	4.6	14.6	3.2	6.1	2.9	1.7	47.8	47.4
Grums	Värmland	82.0	5,819	48.8	20.9	3.7	3.9	7.3	5.5	5.3	3.4	1.3	57.8	35.5
Grästorp	Västra Götaland	86.5	3,834	30.5	31.6	3.6	5.2	14.1	6.3	3.5	4.2	1.0	37.6	55.1
Gullspång	Västra Götaland	84.7	3,497	43.9	22.7	3.7	4.9	7.5	6.2	5.1	5.4	0.7	52.6	40.4
Gällivare	Norrbotten	80.6	12,000	55.9	14.2	3.8	2.3	1.7	5.0	13.6	2.4	1.2	73.3	20.6
Gävle	Gävleborg	84.7	61,323	34.6	27.2	7.5	6.8	4.6	7.5	6.8	3.8	1.2	48.9	42.5
Götene	Västra Götaland	86.9	8,694	34.5	25.5	6.4	6.2	8.7	4.8	4.9	8.2	0.9	45.8	48.6
Habo	Jönköping	90.1	6,943	27.0	30.3	5.2	6.0	5.5	6.1	3.1	16.4	0.5	35.2	58.2
Hagfors	Värmland	82.8	8,225	53.6	14.4	2.6	4.1	7.1	5.3	9.2	2.2	1.7	65.3	27.7
Hallsberg	Örebro	86.2	9,955	44.8	20.7	4.9	4.8	6.3	6.7	5.9	5.3	0.8	55.6	37.0
Hallstahammar	Västmanland	82.4	9,203	47.0	20.4	4.8	6.1	3.5	5.7	7.3	4.3	1.1	59.0	34.3
Halmstad	Halland	84.7	59,936	32.4	31.5	6.4	7.6	6.1	5.3	4.0	5.1	1.7	42.8	50.3
Hammarö	Värmland	88.9	9,898	35.1	31.5	5.8	7.5	4.5	3.9	5.0	5.6	1.2	45.9	49.0
Haninge	Stockholm	83.0	43,921	28.0	36.8	7.3	6.9	3.9	5.8	5.0	4.5	1.9	40.4	52.0
Haparanda	Norrbotten	71.0	4,394	60.4	17.2	2.3	1.5	7.3	3.8	4.4	2.6	0.5	67.1	28.6
Heby	Uppsala	81.7	8,322	33.9	23.8	4.3	5.2	14.4	7.0	4.8	5.5	1.3	42.9	48.8
Hedemora	Dalarna	81.8	9,686	36.4	23.9	6.1	3.5	9.6	8.3	6.4	4.6	1.3	48.9	41.5
Helsingborg	Skåne	81.5	79,081	27.7	36.2	6.5	7.9	3.4	9.0	3.4	4.4	1.6	37.6	51.8
Herrljunga	Västra Götaland	85.6	6,079	27.2	24.8	5.3	7.2	13.0	7.9	4.9	9.0	0.7	37.3	54.0
Hjo	Västra Götaland	86.0	5,950	30.8	28.8	6.6	7.5	7.3	5.2	4.6	8.4	0.8	41.9	52.1
Hofors	Gävleborg	83.2	6,220	49.7	15.6	4.2	5.0	4.0	7.4	11.0	2.0	1.3	64.9	26.5
Huddinge	Stockholm	83.7	53,699	24.8	38.7	7.6	7.7	4.4	4.8	5.3	5.2	1.5	37.8	56.0
Hudiksvall	Gävleborg	81.9	23,472	37.0	21.8	7.2	4.1	10.1	5.7	8.1	4.4	1.6	52.2	40.5
Hultsfred	Kalmar	82.7	8,797	39.1	20.7	4.0	3.7	11.7	6.1	5.4	8.6	0.8	48.4	44.7
Hylte	Halland	82.8	6,103	34.5	25.5	3.8	6.6	12.7	6.9	3.2	5.1	1.6	41.5	49.9
Håbo	Uppsala	86.1	11,959	24.9	42.6	5.5	7.2	5.0	5.9	3.1	4.7	1.1	33.5	59.6
Hällefors	Örebro	82.7	4,556	51.2	17.8	4.5	3.6	4.7	7.2	7.2	2.5	1.2	62.9	28.7
Härjedalen	Jämtland	80.6	6,739	44.6	22.2	3.8	3.8	9.4	7.0	6.0	2.3	0.9	54.4	37.8
Härnösand	Västernorrland	83.6	16,149	40.2	22.4	8.1	5.5	7.4	4.0	6.4	4.1	1.9	54.7	39.4
Härryda	Västra Götaland	88.1	21,491	21.9	36.3	7.6	10.5	6.0	5.6	4.6	6.4	1.2	34.1	59.1
Hässleholm	Skåne	83.7	31,846	28.3	29.0	6.0	5.9	8.0	12.9	3.2	5.8	0.9	37.5	48.7
Höganäs	Skåne	85.9	16,110	20.2	42.4	5.9	9.1	5.4	6.4	2.6	6.7	1.5	28.7	63.5
Högsby	Kalmar	83.0	3,614	41.3	21.3	3.7	3.4	11.3	7.5	4.3	6.1	1.1	49.4	42.0
Hörby	Skåne	81.8	9,174	22.6	33.2	4.5	6.0	9.8	14.0	2.6	4.2	3.0	29.8	53.3
Höör	Skåne	83.6	9,524	22.8	34.7	7.4	7.2	6.2	11.5	3.7	4.6	1.8	34.0	52.7
Jokkmokk	Norrbotten	81.1	3,351	52.6	13.6	7.7	5.0	3.8	3.7	10.4	1.9	1.2	70.8	24.4
Järfälla	Stockholm	85.0	39,735	25.7	36.4	7.8	8.5	4.2	4.8	5.3	6.0	1.4	38.8	55.0
Jönköping	Jönköping	85.9	82,685	29.5	27.9	6.4	6.3	5.3	5.5	4.8	13.5	0.8	40.7	53.0
Kalix	Norrbotten	84.4	11,102	59.3	14.1	5.3	3.7	4.9	3.6	6.4	2.2	0.6	71.0	24.9
Kalmar	Kalmar	86.3	41,863	32.9	29.7	7.9	6.2	6.5	5.4	4.8	5.5	1.1	45.6	47.9
Karlsborg	Västra Götaland	86.2	4,626	33.6	26.9	4.4	7.7	11.0	5.8	3.4	6.6	0.7	41.3	52.1
Karlshamn	Blekinge	85.1	20,666	37.3	26.3	6.3	5.3	5.0	9.4	6.1	3.5	0.9	49.7	40.0
Karlskoga	Örebro	84.3	19,567	46.3	23.2	5.4	5.3	3.1	4.7	5.3	4.8	1.9	57.0	36.4
Karlskrona	Blekinge	87.3	41,492	35.3	28.7	5.6	6.5	5.6	8.9	4.4	4.3	0.9	45.3	45.0
Karlstad	Värmland	86.1	57,709	32.9	29.9	8.0	7.5	5.5	4.2	5.5	5.3	1.2	46.4	48.3
Katrineholm	Södermanland	84.7	20,708	38.4	25.0	7.6	6.8	6.3	6.3	4.6	4.3	0.8	50.6	42.3
Kil	Värmland	85.2	7,650	38.0	26.0	5.3	5.6	9.1	4.7	5.2	5.1	1.0	48.5	45.8
Kinda	Östergötland	86.7	6,527	32.1	25.0	6.3	5.0	13.2	6.3	4.7	6.7	0.7	43.1	49.9
Kiruna	Norrbotten	82.3	14,535	51.7	13.2	5.2	3.2	2.6	5.7	14.0	3.2	1.1	70.9	22.2
Klippan	Skåne	80.1	9,653	31.9	30.9	3.7	5.1	5.7	12.3	4.0	5.2	1.2	39.6	46.9
Knivsta	Uppsala	88.3	8,981	19.2	38.3	7.4	9.5	9.2	4.4	3.5	7.1	1.5	30.0	64.1
Kramfors	Västernorrland	84.1	12,835	50.5	15.7	4.6	3.1	9.9	3.1	8.4	3.4	1.3	63.6	32.1
Kristianstad	Skåne	84.0	50,239	28.6	31.6	5.5	9.0	5.4	11.8	3.3	3.8	1.0	37.5	49.7
Kristinehamn	Värmland	84.6	15,925	40.6	25.4	5.5	6.1	6.1	4.5	6.3	4.4	1.1	52.4	42.0
Krokom	Jämtland	83.2	8,927	37.0	21.3	6.2	3.2	18.1	3.5	6.4	3.2	1.0	49.6	45.9
Kumla	Örebro	86.6	13,022	41.1	23.4	4.7	6.3	5.2	7.2	4.2	6.9	1.0	50.0	41.8
Kungsbacka	Halland	89.3	49,187	15.9	45.6	5.7	9.7	7.4	4.6	2.6	7.3	1.3	24.1	70.0
Kungsör	Västmanland	84.8	5,206	35.3	27.3	5.0	7.0	6.9	7.1	5.7	4.8	1.0	46.0	45.9
Kungälv	Västra Götaland	88.3	27,502	26.0	33.2	6.3	9.1	6.6	6.2	4.4	7.1	1.0	36.8	56.0
Kävlinge	Skåne	87.7	18,422	25.4	40.0	4.7	8.6	5.3	9.1	2.1	3.6	1.2	32.2	57.5
Köping	Västmanland	82.6	15,546	41.0	23.5	5.1	5.4	6.4	7.0	6.8	3.9	1.0	52.8	39.1
Laholm	Halland	84.0	15,135	25.3	33.4	4.6	5.7	12.9	8.7	3.2	4.7	1.5	33.0	56.8
Landskrona	Skåne	81.8	24,361	35.8	28.2	4.3	11.7	2.5	9.9	4.1	2.5	1.0	44.3	44.9
Laxå	Örebro	84.3	3,847	49.1	19.5	3.0	5.2	5.7	5.5	5.2	6.3	0.6	57.2	36.7
Lekeberg	Örebro	86.4	4,761	30.7	24.8	5.3	4.4	12.9	7.5	4.5	8.9	1.1	40.5	50.9
Leksand	Dalarna	85.0	10,245	28.9	31.4	6.5	5.3	9.4	4.0	4.2	8.8	1.5	39.6	54.9
Lerum	Västra Götaland	89.6	24,930	22.3	35.1	8.8	10.1	5.1	5.4	5.1	7.0	1.2	36.2	57.2
Lessebo	Kronoberg	85.5	4,995	41.6	24.1	5.7	4.4	7.5	7.6	5.7	3.0	0.4	53.0	39.0
Lidingö	Stockholm	88.9	28,559	9.2	48.8	5.7	10.7	10.1	2.7	1.9	10.1	0.9	16.8	79.6
Lidköping	Västra Götaland	87.1	25,782	35.3	26.3	6.4	6.7	7.1	5.1	5.7	6.5	0.8	47.4	46.8
Lilla Edet	Västra Götaland	81.8	7,714	37.9	22.3	4.7	6.0	6.5	10.1	7.3	3.8	1.4	49.9	38.6
Lindesberg	Örebro	84.6	14,845	38.6	23.5	5.2	5.0	8.0	9.2	4.6	4.8	1.0	48.4	41.3
Linköping	Östergötland	87.3	95,844	27.6	30.6	9.4	8.8	6.4	4.5	4.7	6.4	1.7	41.6	52.1
Ljungby	Kronoberg	83.8	17,323	30.7	27.9	5.1	5.1	12.8	6.1	4.3	7.1	0.9	40.0	53.0
Ljusdal	Gävleborg	79.1	11,721	37.0	24.1	5.2	4.4	9.5	6.9	7.4	3.6	1.9	49.6	41.6
Ljusnarsberg	Örebro	80.5	3,170	44.4	19.4	4.5	3.2	5.5	9.6	7.9	3.6	1.9	56.8	31.7
Lomma	Skåne	91.3	14,224	14.2	49.8	4.9	10.7	5.5	5.9	1.4	5.6	2.1	20.5	71.5
Ludvika	Dalarna	82.7	16,552	45.1	20.7	5.1	5.0	3.9	7.6	8.2	3.3	1.1	58.4	32.9
Luleå	Norrbotten	87.2	50,050	45.9	20.1	7.2	5.7	5.0	3.5	7.7	3.5	1.5	60.8	34.3
Lund	Skåne	87.3	71,943	19.5	32.1	12.8	11.1	6.6	5.0	5.8	5.0	2.2	38.0	54.8
Lycksele	Västerbotten	82.6	8,072	49.3	16.8	3.3	5.1	4.4	3.6	8.6	8.1	0.6	61.2	34.5
Lysekil	Västra Götaland	84.2	9,688	36.7	25.6	6.5	10.0	4.2	5.8	5.6	4.7	0.9	48.8	44.6
Malmö	Skåne	79.6	169,108	28.7	32.6	8.8	7.0	2.8	7.8	6.0	3.1	3.2	43.4	45.5
Malung-Sälen	Dalarna	82.8	6,672	36.5	30.0	3.0	5.8	8.2	5.7	6.7	2.6	1.5	46.2	46.6
Malå	Västerbotten	82.5	2,111	52.5	14.5	2.6	6.7	3.5	2.7	12.7	4.2	0.7	67.8	28.8
Mariestad	Västra Götaland	83.8	15,526	37.1	28.1	6.1	5.6	5.3	5.2	5.9	5.7	1.0	49.1	44.6
Mark	Västra Götaland	85.7	21,770	34.0	24.5	5.7	7.6	9.3	5.8	5.6	6.7	0.9	45.3	48.0
Markaryd	Kronoberg	82.5	5,860	33.2	27.4	3.6	3.6	9.6	9.2	2.8	10.1	0.6	39.6	50.6
Mellerud	Västra Götaland	81.8	5,769	29.7	26.5	4.5	6.1	13.3	7.7	5.0	6.5	0.8	39.3	52.3
Mjölby	Östergötland	85.8	17,022	37.8	26.0	5.8	6.4	6.8	4.8	5.1	5.7	1.6	48.7	44.9
Mora	Dalarna	81.5	12,930	36.1	26.8	6.0	4.9	9.0	6.1	4.6	4.5	2.0	46.7	45.3
Motala	Östergötland	86.0	27,738	42.9	24.0	5.2	6.2	4.6	5.7	5.5	4.6	1.3	53.6	39.4
Mullsjö	Jönköping	87.9	4,614	27.8	25.6	5.8	5.2	5.0	6.1	4.8	18.8	0.9	38.4	54.6
Munkedal	Västra Götaland	82.1	6,387	32.8	26.0	3.9	5.3	11.8	7.2	5.1	7.0	0.9	41.8	50.1
Munkfors	Värmland	83.9	2,484	56.1	11.8	2.6	5.9	7.3	4.9	6.6	2.9	1.9	65.3	27.8
Mölndal	Västra Götaland	86.5	38,981	24.8	32.9	8.5	10.3	4.8	5.6	5.3	6.5	1.4	38.6	54.4
Mönsterås	Kalmar	85.6	8,729	39.4	23.1	4.4	4.3	10.4	6.6	5.4	5.6	0.9	49.2	43.3
Mörbylånga	Kalmar	87.9	9,490	28.2	31.2	6.3	5.8	11.0	5.9	4.3	6.5	0.9	38.7	54.5
Nacka	Stockholm	88.0	54,930	16.0	43.8	8.7	9.0	7.4	2.8	4.0	6.9	1.3	28.7	67.3
Nora	Örebro	84.9	6,745	40.4	24.2	6.1	6.4	6.2	5.8	4.5	5.5	1.0	51.0	42.3
Norberg	Västmanland	84.1	3,729	42.4	20.0	5.8	4.7	4.6	7.4	11.0	2.9	1.1	59.3	32.3
Nordanstig	Gävleborg	80.8	6,078	37.7	18.8	4.6	5.6	11.4	8.5	7.0	4.9	1.5	49.3	40.7
Nordmaling	Västerbotten	83.0	4,679	45.5	17.3	3.3	6.7	10.6	3.3	7.2	5.4	0.7	56.0	40.0
Norrköping	Östergötland	83.9	81,731	32.5	30.2	7.9	6.0	4.7	6.1	5.7	5.2	1.8	46.1	46.0
Norrtälje	Stockholm	83.2	36,152	26.5	36.1	7.2	6.6	8.0	5.1	4.5	4.9	1.3	38.1	55.6
Norsjö	Västerbotten	81.4	2,729	48.4	11.3	2.8	5.5	9.9	2.4	12.5	5.9	1.4	63.7	32.6
Nybro	Kalmar	84.0	12,835	38.6	24.5	4.0	3.6	10.0	5.8	6.1	6.1	1.4	48.7	44.2
Nykvarn	Stockholm	87.7	5,648	23.9	41.7	6.1	6.9	5.1	7.3	2.5	5.0	1.5	32.5	58.7
Nyköping	Södermanland	85.9	33,999	34.4	27.9	8.2	7.0	6.0	5.3	4.8	5.4	1.1	47.3	46.3
Nynäshamn	Stockholm	84.0	16,171	29.3	35.0	7.2	6.3	4.5	6.1	5.4	4.8	1.4	41.9	50.6
Nässjö	Jönköping	85.2	18,785	34.4	24.1	5.2	4.9	7.0	7.7	5.0	11.0	0.7	44.6	47.0
Ockelbo	Gävleborg	81.7	3,872	41.0	19.8	5.5	3.4	12.5	7.8	6.1	2.9	1.0	52.6	38.6
Olofström	Blekinge	82.3	8,217	47.0	18.9	3.6	3.7	6.1	9.8	5.6	4.5	0.8	56.2	33.2
Orsa	Dalarna	82.5	4,424	36.1	21.3	6.6	4.6	10.2	9.0	6.2	4.7	1.3	48.9	40.7
Orust	Västra Götaland	85.7	10,431	25.6	33.9	6.4	8.3	8.8	4.7	4.7	6.3	1.2	36.7	57.4
Osby	Skåne	83.3	7,962	34.4	24.5	5.3	4.8	9.1	12.8	3.0	5.5	0.6	42.8	43.8
Oskarshamn	Kalmar	84.7	17,215	37.2	27.7	4.2	5.7	5.0	6.2	5.7	7.3	1.0	47.0	45.7
Ovanåker	Gävleborg	80.9	7,372	37.8	18.9	4.2	3.6	15.7	5.3	3.7	10.0	0.9	45.6	48.2
Oxelösund	Södermanland	85.0	7,434	44.2	23.1	7.2	5.3	2.8	4.8	7.8	3.3	1.4	59.2	34.6
Pajala	Norrbotten	81.5	4,065	51.3	12.6	2.1	2.1	3.3	3.9	18.8	5.5	0.4	72.2	23.5
Partille	Västra Götaland	86.9	22,136	24.8	33.9	7.6	10.0	4.0	5.8	5.1	7.1	1.7	37.5	54.9
Piteå	Norrbotten	88.5	28,598	56.5	13.9	5.3	4.2	4.9	2.4	8.0	4.0	0.9	69.8	26.9
Perstorp	Skåne	79.5	4,053	35.7	28.2	4.3	5.1	5.6	11.1	4.7	4.0	1.5	44.7	42.8
Ragunda	Jämtland	80.5	3,552	50.7	14.7	3.5	1.8	13.8	3.8	8.0	1.6	2.2	62.1	31.9
Robertsfors	Västerbotten	85.3	4,556	40.8	13.5	4.3	3.8	20.7	2.4	7.4	6.0	1.1	52.5	44.0
Ronneby	Blekinge	85.6	18,678	34.7	26.8	5.0	4.7	7.5	10.9	5.9	3.5	1.0	45.5	42.6
Rättvik	Dalarna	81.8	7,159	34.1	26.5	6.2	5.1	11.2	6.1	3.7	4.9	2.2	44.0	47.7
Sala	Västmanland	84.3	14,084	33.5	26.3	5.9	6.0	11.3	6.4	4.8	4.9	1.0	44.1	48.5
Salem	Stockholm	87.3	9,215	22.6	38.6	7.9	9.2	5.7	5.2	4.0	5.4	1.4	34.5	58.9
Sandviken	Gävleborg	83.8	23,879	44.1	21.1	5.1	5.0	5.7	6.0	8.1	3.8	1.1	57.3	35.5
Sigtuna	Stockholm	82.2	22,806	27.9	38.2	6.3	7.1	4.5	5.0	3.8	5.9	1.2	38.0	55.7
Simrishamn	Skåne	82.2	12,770	26.5	36.2	6.8	6.2	7.4	7.6	3.4	4.6	1.4	36.7	54.4
Sjöbo	Skåne	81.5	11,189	23.5	35.0	4.1	4.9	8.6	15.8	2.9	3.9	1.3	30.5	52.3
Skara	Västra Götaland	85.3	12,038	34.4	29.4	6.3	5.8	7.3	5.6	4.6	5.5	1.1	45.3	48.0
Skellefteå	Västerbotten	85.6	48,020	49.6	14.3	5.8	5.7	6.0	2.9	9.5	5.4	0.9	64.9	31.3
Skinnskatteberg	Västmanland	84.4	2,950	45.3	17.4	5.3	7.8	6.4	6.7	7.4	2.9	0.9	58.0	34.4
Skurup	Skåne	83.4	9,087	26.3	35.2	4.2	6.3	7.3	13.5	2.7	2.8	1.6	33.3	51.6
Skövde	Västra Götaland	85.3	33,360	31.0	30.3	6.3	7.3	7.5	5.3	4.7	6.3	1.3	42.0	51.4
Smedjebacken	Dalarna	85.2	7,200	50.9	19.7	4.1	3.4	5.1	6.4	6.7	2.7	1.1	61.7	30.8
Sollefteå	Västernorrland	83.8	13,520	52.3	15.5	4.6	3.5	6.4	4.5	7.0	2.7	3.5	63.9	28.1
Sollentuna	Stockholm	87.5	39,084	17.8	42.2	7.3	9.8	7.0	3.2	3.9	7.7	1.3	28.9	66.7
Solna	Stockholm	84.1	42,912	20.6	38.1	10.0	9.1	5.8	3.4	6.1	5.4	1.6	36.6	58.3
Sorsele	Västerbotten	77.4	1,619	42.4	15.3	3.3	3.5	11.4	4.0	11.9	7.5	0.8	57.5	37.7
Sotenäs	Västra Götaland	84.9	6,269	27.2	39.1	4.3	8.2	4.6	4.2	3.8	8.0	0.7	35.3	59.9
Staffanstorp	Skåne	88.2	14,088	22.4	42.6	5.1	8.1	5.1	8.7	2.1	3.8	2.3	29.6	59.5
Stenungsund	Västra Götaland	86.6	15,546	25.8	36.1	7.1	8.6	5.9	4.9	4.2	6.3	1.3	37.0	56.8
Stockholm	Stockholm	85.0	534,887	20.9	34.3	12.2	8.6	6.3	3.2	7.4	5.3	1.8	40.5	54.5
Storfors	Värmland	84.4	2,750	50.8	18.0	3.5	3.3	6.4	5.7	7.3	3.9	1.1	61.6	31.6
Storuman	Västerbotten	78.7	3,911	42.2	18.2	3.5	5.5	9.7	3.3	9.0	7.6	1.2	54.6	40.9
Strängnäs	Södermanland	85.5	20,626	26.8	35.2	6.7	7.7	6.7	6.4	4.2	5.4	1.0	37.7	55.0
Strömstad	Västra Götaland	79.0	6,527	28.0	29.3	8.5	8.6	10.9	4.5	4.2	5.2	0.8	40.6	54.0
Strömsund	Jämtland	82.4	7,896	50.6	17.6	2.9	2.3	10.7	4.8	8.2	2.1	0.8	61.7	32.7
Sundbyberg	Stockholm	82.7	23,121	25.9	34.6	9.9	7.9	4.6	4.4	6.9	4.0	1.8	42.7	51.1
Sundsvall	Västernorrland	84.7	62,481	38.4	26.3	6.3	6.7	5.1	5.5	6.0	3.9	1.9	50.7	42.0
Sunne	Värmland	83.4	8,651	32.6	27.4	4.1	4.9	16.8	4.1	4.5	4.4	1.1	41.2	53.6
Surahammar	Västmanland	83.5	6,159	49.1	19.4	4.1	5.7	2.8	7.0	7.9	2.9	1.1	61.1	30.7
Svalöv	Skåne	82.8	7,909	28.9	27.4	4.8	5.7	11.7	13.1	3.5	3.4	1.5	37.1	48.3
Svedala	Skåne	87.3	12,447	24.2	39.5	4.6	7.3	4.0	13.3	2.2	3.2	1.7	31.0	54.0
Svenljunga	Västra Götaland	83.5	6,427	29.3	29.0	3.8	6.5	14.1	7.9	3.1	5.2	1.0	36.3	54.8
Säffle	Värmland	82.3	9,978	33.6	27.4	4.4	5.6	12.1	6.4	3.9	5.9	0.7	41.8	51.1
Säter	Dalarna	83.6	7,085	33.8	26.2	4.9	4.6	11.7	7.8	5.7	4.2	1.2	44.3	46.7
Sävsjö	Jönköping	86.2	7,002	25.3	25.0	2.8	4.4	12.3	9.2	3.0	17.7	0.3	31.1	59.4
Söderhamn	Gävleborg	82.8	16,845	43.4	20.2	5.2	3.9	6.9	8.4	7.0	3.3	1.7	55.6	34.2
Söderköping	Östergötland	85.8	9,336	26.2	33.7	7.1	5.9	10.0	5.0	4.2	6.6	1.3	37.6	56.1
Södertälje	Stockholm	79.5	45,458	34.0	29.5	8.3	6.2	3.9	5.6	5.2	5.4	2.0	47.5	44.9
Sölvesborg	Blekinge	85.0	11,109	34.4	31.5	4.1	4.1	4.8	12.2	4.0	4.0	0.9	42.5	44.4
Tanum	Västra Götaland	82.3	7,901	22.0	32.6	6.3	9.2	15.4	4.4	3.4	5.8	1.0	31.7	63.0
Tibro	Västra Götaland	84.9	6,823	36.4	23.4	4.4	7.2	7.3	6.4	4.3	10.0	0.6	45.1	47.9
Tidaholm	Västra Götaland	86.1	8,394	43.8	22.0	4.8	5.0	6.8	6.2	5.4	5.2	0.8	54.1	38.9
Tierp	Uppsala	84.0	12,907	42.9	20.6	4.7	4.6	10.4	6.3	5.4	3.7	1.6	52.9	39.2
Timrå	Västernorrland	84.3	11,450	49.8	18.5	3.8	4.9	5.5	6.0	7.3	2.9	1.3	60.9	31.8
Tingsryd	Kronoberg	82.6	7,831	29.4	30.4	3.8	4.0	15.3	7.3	3.5	5.8	0.5	36.7	55.5
Tjörn	Västra Götaland	87.5	10,321	20.4	36.1	5.9	9.9	5.6	5.0	3.0	13.2	0.9	29.3	64.8
Tomelilla	Skåne	80.3	7,951	28.4	31.1	4.9	4.5	9.8	13.4	3.0	2.9	2.1	36.3	48.2
Torsby	Värmland	79.8	7,766	44.3	24.3	2.8	3.5	8.8	4.2	7.2	3.1	1.8	54.3	39.7
Torsås	Kalmar	84.4	4,589	34.0	25.3	4.6	3.6	14.5	7.2	3.8	6.0	0.8	42.5	49.6
Tranemo	Västra Götaland	85.9	7,443	32.0	26.7	4.9	5.9	14.1	6.9	3.1	5.5	0.9	40.0	52.2
Tranås	Jönköping	85.1	11,823	34.8	26.8	6.3	5.4	6.5	6.4	3.9	9.6	0.5	44.9	48.2
Trelleborg	Skåne	83.2	26,202	30.6	34.1	3.9	5.8	4.0	13.8	2.5	3.7	1.7	37.1	47.5
Trollhättan	Västra Götaland	84.8	34,379	42.0	24.1	6.8	7.4	3.7	4.9	5.8	4.4	1.0	54.6	39.5
Trosa	Södermanland	87.9	7,487	23.5	41.3	7.4	7.0	5.2	5.8	3.5	5.4	1.0	34.4	58.8
Tyresö	Stockholm	87.1	26,064	21.6	42.2	8.2	8.4	4.8	4.1	4.0	5.5	1.3	33.7	60.9
Täby	Stockholm	88.9	41,136	10.8	50.8	5.2	11.5	7.8	2.3	1.9	8.8	1.0	17.9	78.8
Töreboda	Västra Götaland	81.9	5,763	37.6	24.8	4.3	3.9	11.6	6.5	5.1	5.3	0.9	47.1	45.6
Uddevalla	Västra Götaland	84.7	33,435	33.4	28.8	7.0	6.6	5.0	6.1	5.2	6.8	1.1	45.6	47.2
Ulricehamn	Västra Götaland	85.7	14,886	26.2	29.4	6.1	6.8	12.2	6.7	3.9	7.9	0.9	36.2	56.2
Umeå	Västerbotten	87.0	75,759	35.3	20.9	10.5	6.6	6.8	2.3	11.1	4.8	1.8	56.9	39.0
Upplands-Bro	Stockholm	84.6	13,894	27.7	35.1	6.8	8.2	4.2	5.2	4.5	7.0	1.4	39.0	54.5
Upplands Väsby	Stockholm	83.2	22,900	27.3	36.7	7.0	8.3	4.0	4.8	5.2	5.5	1.3	39.4	54.5
Uppsala	Uppsala	86.6	128,059	24.0	29.5	11.2	9.2	7.6	3.8	6.4	6.4	2.0	41.5	52.7
Uppvidinge	Kronoberg	83.2	5,675	32.6	25.6	3.7	4.0	14.3	9.1	5.0	5.3	0.4	41.4	49.1
Vadstena	Östergötland	88.0	5,197	32.9	31.1	6.6	6.8	6.2	5.0	3.9	6.7	0.9	43.4	50.8
Vaggeryd	Jönköping	85.3	8,195	33.4	24.6	3.6	4.4	7.9	7.4	3.3	14.8	0.7	40.2	51.6
Valdemarsvik	Östergötland	85.0	5,331	37.0	26.2	4.4	4.2	11.9	6.4	4.1	5.2	0.6	45.5	47.5
Vallentuna	Stockholm	87.6	18,307	16.9	44.5	7.7	8.7	7.3	4.0	3.0	6.5	1.4	27.6	67.0
Vansbro	Dalarna	82.1	4,398	40.4	19.7	2.6	3.6	13.9	6.1	5.8	6.8	1.2	48.8	44.0
Vara	Västra Götaland	83.9	10,221	28.3	33.0	3.7	5.6	12.4	5.8	4.2	6.2	0.8	36.1	57.2
Varberg	Halland	86.9	38,632	29.0	31.8	6.2	7.4	9.9	4.8	4.2	5.3	1.4	39.5	54.4
Vaxholm	Stockholm	89.7	7,083	12.4	48.5	7.6	9.3	8.5	2.7	3.1	6.9	1.2	23.0	73.1
Vellinge	Skåne	90.8	22,614	9.4	59.1	3.2	8.7	4.3	7.0	0.9	6.2	1.4	13.5	78.2
Vetlanda	Jönköping	84.5	16,880	30.4	25.3	4.5	5.6	11.4	6.6	4.3	11.3	0.6	39.2	53.5
Vilhelmina	Västerbotten	84.1	4,653	51.8	11.7	2.8	4.7	6.7	4.3	8.4	6.1	3.6	62.9	29.2
Vimmerby	Kalmar	84.5	10,060	35.6	25.6	4.6	3.9	12.5	6.3	4.2	6.3	1.0	44.4	48.3
Vindeln	Västerbotten	82.6	3,621	41.1	20.3	3.1	5.8	13.0	3.2	5.8	6.7	1.0	50.0	45.8
Vingåker	Södermanland	85.9	5,841	41.5	24.1	6.5	4.1	6.9	7.3	4.1	4.7	0.9	52.0	39.8
Vårgårda	Västra Götaland	86.5	7,077	26.6	23.2	6.2	8.2	11.9	5.9	4.1	13.2	0.9	36.9	56.4
Vänersborg	Västra Götaland	85.2	24,028	34.0	26.0	7.1	7.5	5.8	6.3	6.7	5.4	1.2	47.9	44.6
Vännäs	Västerbotten	84.6	5,434	40.8	18.3	5.0	5.3	11.3	2.6	10.4	5.5	0.9	56.2	40.3
Värmdö	Stockholm	87.7	23,152	17.6	45.9	8.6	7.6	5.8	4.1	3.6	5.4	1.3	29.8	64.8
Värnamo	Jönköping	84.9	21,001	31.4	25.1	4.4	4.7	11.7	6.6	2.9	12.6	0.5	38.7	54.2
Västervik	Kalmar	83.7	24,137	40.0	25.8	5.4	5.5	7.3	5.2	5.1	4.7	1.1	50.4	43.3
Västerås	Västmanland	85.2	87,096	32.7	30.4	6.4	8.9	4.3	5.9	4.8	5.1	1.6	43.9	48.6
Växjö	Kronoberg	86.7	53,241	28.8	31.6	7.7	7.2	7.5	5.1	5.2	5.9	1.0	41.7	52.1
Ydre	Östergötland	88.7	2,568	28.2	25.6	4.9	5.1	16.0	5.8	2.9	11.3	0.4	35.9	57.9
Ystad	Skåne	83.5	18,897	28.4	37.9	5.5	6.5	5.8	8.4	2.6	3.5	1.5	36.4	53.6
Åmål	Västra Götaland	81.3	7,861	39.7	24.8	6.1	6.0	6.6	5.5	5.3	5.2	0.8	51.1	42.6
Ånge	Västernorrland	82.5	6,578	49.8	18.9	3.2	3.2	7.7	5.9	6.9	2.9	1.6	59.9	32.7
Åre	Jämtland	83.4	6,487	31.6	26.7	8.7	5.2	14.6	3.1	4.9	4.0	1.2	45.2	50.6
Årjäng	Värmland	77.9	5,248	31.7	24.4	3.0	7.4	14.3	6.6	3.3	8.4	1.0	38.0	54.5
Åsele	Västerbotten	83.3	2,004	51.2	13.6	1.9	5.8	9.6	3.9	7.4	5.4	1.2	60.5	34.4
Åstorp	Skåne	79.6	8,088	38.5	29.0	3.9	4.8	4.4	11.9	2.7	3.8	1.1	45.1	41.9
Åtvidaberg	Östergötland	86.2	7,642	41.4	25.2	5.2	4.8	8.2	5.0	4.4	5.1	0.6	51.0	43.4
Älmhult	Kronoberg	84.7	9,879	31.5	29.9	5.5	4.8	11.0	7.3	3.3	5.9	0.9	40.3	51.5
Älvdalen	Dalarna	81.2	4,615	41.7	22.8	3.7	3.1	10.6	7.9	5.3	3.8	1.2	50.7	40.2
Älvkarleby	Uppsala	84.8	5,874	48.9	19.3	5.2	5.0	3.2	7.9	6.8	2.5	1.0	60.9	30.1
Älvsbyn	Norrbotten	85.3	5,623	54.7	10.8	2.7	4.0	6.2	5.2	11.7	3.5	1.3	69.1	24.4
Ängelholm	Skåne	83.7	25,591	22.6	40.7	6.0	6.5	6.5	7.6	2.7	5.8	1.5	31.3	59.6
Öckerö	Västra Götaland	89.4	8,422	18.9	36.2	5.9	8.2	2.8	4.5	3.1	19.3	1.1	27.9	66.5
Ödeshög	Östergötland	85.5	3,482	31.2	26.5	5.9	3.8	9.6	5.9	3.8	12.4	0.9	40.9	52.3
Örebro	Örebro	86.2	87,788	34.1	26.0	8.1	7.6	4.8	5.5	5.8	7.0	1.1	48.1	45.3
Örkelljunga	Skåne	80.5	5,734	25.7	29.4	4.1	5.9	6.6	12.4	3.0	11.5	1.5	32.7	53.4
Örnsköldsvik	Västernorrland	85.8	36,962	46.9	19.0	4.5	4.2	9.5	3.0	4.1	6.9	1.8	55.6	39.6
Östersund	Jämtland	84.3	39,297	37.8	23.9	8.1	4.5	11.7	3.1	6.6	3.1	1.2	52.5	43.2
Österåker	Stockholm	87.3	24,393	17.8	45.5	7.5	9.2	5.8	3.5	3.3	6.2	1.2	28.7	66.6
Östhammar	Uppsala	83.1	13,767	35.3	28.2	4.4	5.8	10.7	5.5	4.5	4.2	1.3	44.2	48.9
Östra Göinge	Skåne	83.6	8,645	36.4	24.8	4.3	6.0	6.2	13.7	3.5	4.2	1.0	44.2	41.1
Överkalix	Norrbotten	83.3	2,487	61.0	8.1	2.4	3.0	9.1	3.7	10.8	1.4	0.6	74.1	21.7
Övertorneå	Norrbotten	80.8	2,801	52.2	13.5	2.6	2.8	11.4	3.4	10.5	3.4	0.4	65.2	31.0
Total		84.6	5,960,408	30.7	30.1	7.3	7.1	6.6	5.7	5.6	5.6	1.4	43.6	49.3
Source: val.se

== Municipal results ==
=== Blekinge ===
Location	Turnout	Share	Votes	S	M	MP	FP	C	SD	V	KD	Other	Left	Right
Karlshamn	85.1	20.6	20,666	37.3	26.3	6.3	5.3	5.0	9.4	6.1	3.5	0.9	49.7	40.0
Karlskrona	87.3	41.4	41,492	35.3	28.7	5.6	6.5	5.6	8.9	4.4	4.3	0.9	45.3	45.0
Olofström	82.3	8.2	8,217	47.0	18.9	3.6	3.7	6.1	9.8	5.6	4.5	0.8	56.2	33.2
Ronneby	85.6	18.6	18,678	34.7	26.8	5.0	4.7	7.5	10.9	5.9	3.5	1.0	45.5	42.6
Sölvesborg	85.0	11.1	11,109	34.4	31.5	4.1	4.1	4.8	12.2	4.0	4.0	0.9	42.5	44.4
Total	85.8	1.7	100,162	36.5	27.3	5.3	5.4	5.8	9.8	5.1	4.0	0.9	46.8	42.5
Source: val.se

=== Dalarna ===
Location	Turnout	Share	Votes	S	M	MP	FP	C	SD	V	KD	Other	Left	Right
Avesta	83.7	8.0	14,345	44.1	22.9	5.0	4.8	6.3	7.2	5.4	3.5	1.0	54.4	37.4
Borlänge	84.9	17.2	30,756	39.6	23.2	6.0	5.0	5.4	9.2	6.6	3.5	1.5	52.2	37.1
Falun	85.4	20.4	36,559	31.5	28.9	8.1	5.7	8.1	5.5	5.5	5.0	1.8	45.1	47.6
Gagnef	85.8	3.7	6,542	34.9	23.7	6.1	4.1	12.3	7.3	5.0	5.7	1.1	45.9	45.7
Hedemora	81.8	5.4	9,686	36.4	23.9	6.1	3.5	9.6	8.3	6.4	4.6	1.3	48.9	41.5
Leksand	85.0	5.7	10,245	28.9	31.4	6.5	5.3	9.4	4.0	4.2	8.8	1.5	39.6	54.9
Ludvika	82.7	9.2	16,552	45.1	20.7	5.1	5.0	3.9	7.6	8.2	3.3	1.1	58.4	32.9
Malung-Sälen	82.8	3.7	6,672	36.5	30.0	3.0	5.8	8.2	5.7	6.7	2.6	1.5	46.2	46.6
Mora	81.5	7.2	12,930	36.1	26.8	6.0	4.9	9.0	6.1	4.6	4.5	2.0	46.7	45.3
Orsa	82.5	2.5	4,424	36.1	21.3	6.6	4.6	10.2	9.0	6.2	4.7	1.3	48.9	40.7
Rättvik	81.8	4.0	7,159	34.1	26.5	6.2	5.1	11.2	6.1	3.7	4.9	2.2	44.0	47.7
Smedjebacken	85.2	4.0	7,200	50.9	19.7	4.1	3.4	5.1	6.4	6.7	2.7	1.1	61.7	30.8
Säter	83.6	4.0	7,085	33.8	26.2	4.9	4.6	11.7	7.8	5.7	4.2	1.2	44.3	46.7
Vansbro	82.1	2.5	4,398	40.4	19.7	2.6	3.6	13.9	6.1	5.8	6.8	1.2	48.8	44.0
Älvdalen	81.2	2.6	4,615	41.7	22.8	3.7	3.1	10.6	7.9	5.3	3.8	1.2	50.7	40.2
Total	83.8	3.0	179,168	37.5	25.1	6.0	4.9	7.9	7.0	5.9	4.4	1.5	49.3	42.3
Source: val.se

=== Gotland ===
Location	Turnout	Share	Votes	S	M	MP	FP	C	SD	V	KD	Other	Left	Right
Gotland	84.9	100.0	38,640	33.3	25.2	8.4	4.6	14.6	3.2	6.1	2.9	1.7	47.8	47.4
Total	84.9	0.6	38,640	33.3	25.2	8.4	4.6	14.6	3.2	6.1	2.9	1.7	47.8	47.4
Source: val.se

=== Gävleborg ===
Location	Turnout	Share	Votes	S	M	MP	FP	C	SD	V	KD	Other	Left	Right
Bollnäs	79.9	9.3	16,466	36.8	22.3	5.3	5.4	9.6	8.4	6.8	4.3	1.1	49.0	41.5
Gävle	84.7	34.6	61,323	34.6	27.2	7.5	6.8	4.6	7.5	6.8	3.8	1.2	48.9	42.5
Hofors	83.2	3.5	6,220	49.7	15.6	4.2	5.0	4.0	7.4	11.0	2.0	1.3	64.9	26.5
Hudiksvall	81.9	13.2	23,472	37.0	21.8	7.2	4.1	10.1	5.7	8.1	4.4	1.6	52.2	40.5
Ljusdal	79.1	6.6	11,721	37.0	24.1	5.2	4.4	9.5	6.9	7.4	3.6	1.9	49.6	41.6
Nordanstig	80.8	3.4	6,078	37.7	18.8	4.6	5.6	11.4	8.5	7.0	4.9	1.5	49.3	40.7
Ockelbo	81.7	2.2	3,872	41.0	19.8	5.5	3.4	12.5	7.8	6.1	2.9	1.0	52.6	38.6
Ovanåker	80.9	4.2	7,372	37.8	18.9	4.2	3.6	15.7	5.3	3.7	10.0	0.9	45.6	48.2
Sandviken	83.8	13.5	23,879	44.1	21.1	5.1	5.0	5.7	6.0	8.1	3.8	1.1	57.3	35.5
Söderhamn	82.8	9.5	16,845	43.4	20.2	5.2	3.9	6.9	8.4	7.0	3.3	1.7	55.6	34.2
Total	82.8	3.0	177,248	38.3	23.1	6.2	5.3	7.3	7.1	7.2	4.1	1.3	51.7	39.9
Source: val.se

=== Halland ===
Location	Turnout	Share	Votes	S	M	MP	FP	C	SD	V	KD	Other	Left	Right
Falkenberg	84.9	13.6	26,572	30.0	28.9	6.0	6.9	12.6	5.8	3.7	4.8	1.4	39.6	53.2
Halmstad	84.7	30.6	59,936	32.4	31.5	6.4	7.6	6.1	5.3	4.0	5.1	1.7	42.8	50.3
Hylte	82.8	3.1	6,103	34.5	25.5	3.8	6.6	12.7	6.9	3.2	5.1	1.6	41.5	49.9
Kungsbacka	89.3	25.2	49,187	15.9	45.6	5.7	9.7	7.4	4.6	2.6	7.3	1.3	24.1	70.0
Laholm	84.0	7.7	15,135	25.3	33.4	4.6	5.7	12.9	8.7	3.2	4.7	1.5	33.0	56.8
Varberg	86.9	19.8	38,632	29.0	31.8	6.2	7.4	9.9	4.8	4.2	5.3	1.4	39.5	54.4
Total	86.2	3.3	195,565	26.8	34.7	5.9	7.8	8.8	5.4	3.5	5.6	1.5	36.2	56.9
Source: val.se

=== Jämtland ===
Location	Turnout	Share	Votes	S	M	MP	FP	C	SD	V	KD	Other	Left	Right
Berg	80.5	5.7	4,670	39.4	21.4	5.3	2.7	17.5	4.7	5.3	2.6	1.2	50.0	44.2
Bräcke	82.1	5.3	4,368	49.8	17.6	3.8	3.4	12.1	3.9	6.8	1.4	1.1	60.5	34.5
Härjedalen	80.6	8.2	6,739	44.6	22.2	3.8	3.8	9.4	7.0	6.0	2.3	0.9	54.4	37.8
Krokom	83.2	10.9	8,927	37.0	21.3	6.2	3.2	18.1	3.5	6.4	3.2	1.0	49.6	45.9
Ragunda	80.5	4.3	3,552	50.7	14.7	3.5	1.8	13.8	3.8	8.0	1.6	2.2	62.1	31.9
Strömsund	82.4	9.6	7,896	50.6	17.6	2.9	2.3	10.7	4.8	8.2	2.1	0.8	61.7	32.7
Åre	83.4	7.9	6,487	31.6	26.7	8.7	5.2	14.6	3.1	4.9	4.0	1.2	45.2	50.6
Östersund	84.3	48.0	39,297	37.8	23.9	8.1	4.5	11.7	3.1	6.6	3.1	1.2	52.5	43.2
Total	83.1	1.4	81,936	40.3	22.2	6.5	3.9	12.8	3.8	6.5	2.9	1.2	53.3	41.7
Source: val.se

=== Jönköping ===
Location	Turnout	Share	Votes	S	M	MP	FP	C	SD	V	KD	Other	Left	Right
Aneby	86.1	2.0	4,241	26.6	22.6	4.6	5.1	12.3	7.6	3.0	17.7	0.6	34.2	57.6
Eksjö	84.8	5.0	10,751	27.7	28.7	5.2	6.0	11.1	5.8	3.6	11.2	0.7	36.6	57.0
Gislaved	83.4	8.2	17,861	34.4	28.4	3.9	5.3	9.8	7.2	2.9	7.6	0.6	41.2	51.0
Gnosjö	84.2	2.7	5,783	29.6	25.3	2.9	4.8	7.9	7.0	2.7	19.1	0.8	35.2	57.1
Habo	90.1	3.2	6,943	27.0	30.3	5.2	6.0	5.5	6.1	3.1	16.4	0.5	35.2	58.2
Jönköping	85.9	38.2	82,685	29.5	27.9	6.4	6.3	5.3	5.5	4.8	13.5	0.8	40.7	53.0
Mullsjö	87.9	2.1	4,614	27.8	25.6	5.8	5.2	5.0	6.1	4.8	18.8	0.9	38.4	54.6
Nässjö	85.2	8.7	18,785	34.4	24.1	5.2	4.9	7.0	7.7	5.0	11.0	0.7	44.6	47.0
Sävsjö	86.2	3.2	7,002	25.3	25.0	2.8	4.4	12.3	9.2	3.0	17.7	0.3	31.1	59.4
Tranås	85.1	5.5	11,823	34.8	26.8	6.3	5.4	6.5	6.4	3.9	9.6	0.5	44.9	48.2
Vaggeryd	85.3	3.8	8,195	33.4	24.6	3.6	4.4	7.9	7.4	3.3	14.8	0.7	40.2	51.6
Vetlanda	84.5	7.8	16,880	30.4	25.3	4.5	5.6	11.4	6.6	4.3	11.3	0.6	39.2	53.5
Värnamo	84.9	9.7	21,001	31.4	25.1	4.4	4.7	11.7	6.6	2.9	12.6	0.5	38.7	54.2
Total	85.5	3.6	216,564	30.6	26.7	5.3	5.6	7.8	6.4	4.1	12.9	0.7	40.0	53.0
Source: val.se

=== Kalmar ===
Location	Turnout	Share	Votes	S	M	MP	FP	C	SD	V	KD	Other	Left	Right
Borgholm	84.2	4.7	7,340	23.3	31.7	6.2	5.0	16.8	5.2	3.6	7.3	1.0	33.0	60.8
Emmaboda	84.9	3.9	6,067	40.3	23.6	4.7	3.0	11.1	5.8	5.2	5.3	1.1	50.2	43.0
Hultsfred	82.7	5.7	8,797	39.1	20.7	4.0	3.7	11.7	6.1	5.4	8.6	0.8	48.4	44.7
Högsby	83.0	2.3	3,614	41.3	21.3	3.7	3.4	11.3	7.5	4.3	6.1	1.1	49.4	42.0
Kalmar	86.3	27.1	41,863	32.9	29.7	7.9	6.2	6.5	5.4	4.8	5.5	1.1	45.6	47.9
Mönsterås	85.6	5.6	8,729	39.4	23.1	4.4	4.3	10.4	6.6	5.4	5.6	0.9	49.2	43.3
Mörbylånga	87.9	6.1	9,490	28.2	31.2	6.3	5.8	11.0	5.9	4.3	6.5	0.9	38.7	54.5
Nybro	84.0	8.3	12,835	38.6	24.5	4.0	3.6	10.0	5.8	6.1	6.1	1.4	48.7	44.2
Oskarshamn	84.7	11.1	17,215	37.2	27.7	4.2	5.7	5.0	6.2	5.7	7.3	1.0	47.0	45.7
Torsås	84.4	3.0	4,589	34.0	25.3	4.6	3.6	14.5	7.2	3.8	6.0	0.8	42.5	49.6
Vimmerby	84.5	6.5	10,060	35.6	25.6	4.6	3.9	12.5	6.3	4.2	6.3	1.0	44.4	48.3
Västervik	83.7	15.6	24,137	40.0	25.8	5.4	5.5	7.3	5.2	5.1	4.7	1.1	50.4	43.3
Total	85.0	2.6	154,736	35.9	26.9	5.6	5.1	8.9	5.8	5.1	6.0	1.0	46.2	46.9
Source: val.se

=== Kronoberg ===
Location	Turnout	Share	Votes	S	M	MP	FP	C	SD	V	KD	Other	Left	Right
Alvesta	83.9	10.0	11,709	31.0	30.3	4.3	4.7	11.2	7.8	4.5	5.4	0.8	39.8	51.6
Lessebo	85.5	4.3	4,995	41.6	24.1	5.7	4.4	7.5	7.6	5.7	3.0	0.4	53.0	39.0
Ljungby	83.8	14.9	17,323	30.7	27.9	5.1	5.1	12.8	6.1	4.3	7.1	0.9	40.0	53.0
Markaryd	82.5	5.0	5,860	33.2	27.4	3.6	3.6	9.6	9.2	2.8	10.1	0.6	39.6	50.6
Tingsryd	82.6	6.7	7,831	29.4	30.4	3.8	4.0	15.3	7.3	3.5	5.8	0.5	36.7	55.5
Uppvidinge	83.2	4.9	5,675	32.6	25.6	3.7	4.0	14.3	9.1	5.0	5.3	0.4	41.4	49.1
Växjö	86.7	45.7	53,241	28.8	31.6	7.7	7.2	7.5	5.1	5.2	5.9	1.0	41.7	52.1
Älmhult	84.7	8.5	9,879	31.5	29.9	5.5	4.8	11.0	7.3	3.3	5.9	0.9	40.3	51.5
Total	85.1	2.0	116,513	30.5	29.8	6.1	5.7	9.9	6.4	4.6	6.1	0.9	41.2	51.6
Source: val.se

=== Norrbotten ===
Location	Turnout	Share	Votes	S	M	MP	FP	C	SD	V	KD	Other	Left	Right
Arjeplog	79.4	1.2	1,973	46.7	14.5	4.6	5.9	5.8	4.9	11.7	4.9	1.1	62.9	31.1
Arvidsjaur	84.1	2.7	4,411	54.0	13.4	2.6	4.1	7.2	4.5	11.1	2.0	1.1	67.8	26.7
Boden	86.1	11.3	18,573	49.8	20.9	4.2	4.7	3.7	4.6	8.0	3.2	1.0	62.0	32.5
Gällivare	80.6	7.3	12,000	55.9	14.2	3.8	2.3	1.7	5.0	13.6	2.4	1.2	73.3	20.6
Haparanda	71.0	2.7	4,394	60.4	17.2	2.3	1.5	7.3	3.8	4.4	2.6	0.5	67.1	28.6
Jokkmokk	81.1	2.0	3,351	52.6	13.6	7.7	5.0	3.8	3.7	10.4	1.9	1.2	70.8	24.4
Kalix	84.4	6.8	11,102	59.3	14.1	5.3	3.7	4.9	3.6	6.4	2.2	0.6	71.0	24.9
Kiruna	82.3	8.9	14,535	51.7	13.2	5.2	3.2	2.6	5.7	14.0	3.2	1.1	70.9	22.2
Luleå	87.2	30.5	50,050	45.9	20.1	7.2	5.7	5.0	3.5	7.7	3.5	1.5	60.8	34.3
Pajala	81.5	2.5	4,065	51.3	12.6	2.1	2.1	3.3	3.9	18.8	5.5	0.4	72.2	23.5
Piteå	88.5	17.4	28,598	56.5	13.9	5.3	4.2	4.9	2.4	8.0	4.0	0.9	69.8	26.9
Älvsbyn	85.3	3.4	5,623	54.7	10.8	2.7	4.0	6.2	5.2	11.7	3.5	1.3	69.1	24.4
Överkalix	83.3	1.5	2,487	61.0	8.1	2.4	3.0	9.1	3.7	10.8	1.4	0.6	74.1	21.7
Övertorneå	80.8	1.7	2,801	52.2	13.5	2.6	2.8	11.4	3.4	10.5	3.4	0.4	65.2	31.0
Total	84.9	2.8	163,963	51.9	16.4	5.3	4.3	4.7	3.9	9.3	3.3	1.1	66.4	28.6
Source: val.se

=== Skåne ===
==== Malmö ====
Location	Turnout	Share	Votes	S	M	MP	FP	C	SD	V	KD	Other	Left	Right
Malmö	79.6	100.0	169,108	28.7	32.6	8.8	7.0	2.8	7.8	6.0	3.1	3.2	43.4	45.5
Total	79.6	2.8	169,108	28.7	32.6	8.8	7.0	2.8	7.8	6.0	3.1	3.2	43.4	45.5
Source: val.se

==== Skåne NE ====
Location	Turnout	Share	Votes	S	M	MP	FP	C	SD	V	KD	Other	Left	Right
Bromölla	84.3	4.1	7,853	41.1	22.4	4.0	5.5	3.5	15.4	4.6	2.8	0.7	49.7	34.2
Båstad	85.3	5.1	9,769	15.3	44.1	5.5	7.4	12.1	5.6	1.9	7.2	0.9	22.6	70.8
Hässleholm	83.7	16.7	31,846	28.3	29.0	6.0	5.9	8.0	12.9	3.2	5.8	0.9	37.5	48.7
Klippan	80.1	5.1	9,653	31.9	30.9	3.7	5.1	5.7	12.3	4.0	5.2	1.2	39.6	46.9
Kristianstad	84.0	26.4	50,239	28.6	31.6	5.5	9.0	5.4	11.8	3.3	3.8	1.0	37.5	49.7
Osby	83.3	4.2	7,962	34.4	24.5	5.3	4.8	9.1	12.8	3.0	5.5	0.6	42.8	43.8
Perstorp	79.5	2.1	4,053	35.7	28.2	4.3	5.1	5.6	11.1	4.7	4.0	1.5	44.7	42.8
Simrishamn	82.2	6.7	12,770	26.5	36.2	6.8	6.2	7.4	7.6	3.4	4.6	1.4	36.7	54.4
Tomelilla	80.3	4.2	7,951	28.4	31.1	4.9	4.5	9.8	13.4	3.0	2.9	2.1	36.3	48.2
Åstorp	79.6	4.3	8,088	38.5	29.0	3.9	4.8	4.4	11.9	2.7	3.8	1.1	45.1	41.9
Ängelholm	83.7	13.5	25,591	22.6	40.7	6.0	6.5	6.5	7.6	2.7	5.8	1.5	31.3	59.6
Örkelljunga	80.5	3.0	5,734	25.7	29.4	4.1	5.9	6.6	12.4	3.0	11.5	1.5	32.7	53.4
Östra Göinge	83.6	4.5	8,645	36.4	24.8	4.3	6.0	6.2	13.7	3.5	4.2	1.0	44.2	41.1
Total	83.0	3.2	190,154	28.7	32.0	5.4	6.7	6.8	11.2	3.2	5.0	1.1	37.3	50.4
Source: val.se

==== Skåne S ====
Location	Turnout	Share	Votes	S	M	MP	FP	C	SD	V	KD	Other	Left	Right
Burlöv	80.7	4.1	9,413	33.6	30.9	5.3	6.9	2.7	12.5	3.8	2.5	1.9	42.6	43.0
Kävlinge	87.7	8.1	18,422	25.4	40.0	4.7	8.6	5.3	9.1	2.1	3.6	1.2	32.2	57.5
Lomma	91.3	6.2	14,224	14.2	49.8	4.9	10.7	5.5	5.9	1.4	5.6	2.1	20.5	71.5
Lund	87.3	31.5	71,943	19.5	32.1	12.8	11.1	6.6	5.0	5.8	5.0	2.2	38.0	54.8
Sjöbo	81.5	4.9	11,189	23.5	35.0	4.1	4.9	8.6	15.8	2.9	3.9	1.3	30.5	52.3
Skurup	83.4	4.0	9,087	26.3	35.2	4.2	6.3	7.3	13.5	2.7	2.8	1.6	33.3	51.6
Staffanstorp	88.2	6.2	14,088	22.4	42.6	5.1	8.1	5.1	8.7	2.1	3.8	2.3	29.6	59.5
Svedala	87.3	5.4	12,447	24.2	39.5	4.6	7.3	4.0	13.3	2.2	3.2	1.7	31.0	54.0
Trelleborg	83.2	11.5	26,202	30.6	34.1	3.9	5.8	4.0	13.8	2.5	3.7	1.7	37.1	47.5
Vellinge	90.8	9.9	22,614	9.4	59.1	3.2	8.7	4.3	7.0	0.9	6.2	1.4	13.5	78.2
Ystad	83.5	8.3	18,897	28.4	37.9	5.5	6.5	5.8	8.4	2.6	3.5	1.5	36.4	53.6
Total	86.4	3.8	228,526	22.1	38.5	7.1	8.6	5.6	8.7	3.3	4.3	1.8	32.5	57.0
Source: val.se

==== Skåne W ====
Location	Turnout	Share	Votes	S	M	MP	FP	C	SD	V	KD	Other	Left	Right
Bjuv	79.5	4.7	8,212	40.6	25.9	3.4	4.9	3.7	14.9	3.2	2.7	0.7	47.2	37.2
Eslöv	82.7	11.0	19,064	32.2	29.6	4.8	7.0	7.0	11.8	3.2	2.8	1.6	40.2	46.4
Helsingborg	81.5	45.6	79,081	27.7	36.2	6.5	7.9	3.4	9.0	3.4	4.4	1.6	37.6	51.8
Höganäs	85.9	9.3	16,110	20.2	42.4	5.9	9.1	5.4	6.4	2.6	6.7	1.5	28.7	63.5
Hörby	81.8	5.3	9,174	22.6	33.2	4.5	6.0	9.8	14.0	2.6	4.2	3.0	29.8	53.3
Höör	83.6	5.5	9,524	22.8	34.7	7.4	7.2	6.2	11.5	3.7	4.6	1.8	34.0	52.7
Landskrona	81.8	14.0	24,361	35.8	28.2	4.3	11.7	2.5	9.9	4.1	2.5	1.0	44.3	44.9
Svalöv	82.8	4.6	7,909	28.9	27.4	4.8	5.7	11.7	13.1	3.5	3.4	1.5	37.1	48.3
Total	82.2	2.9	173,435	28.8	33.8	5.7	8.1	4.7	10.1	3.4	4.0	1.5	37.8	50.6
Source: val.se

=== Stockholm ===
==== Stockholm (city) ====
Location	Turnout	Share	Votes	S	M	MP	FP	C	SD	V	KD	Other	Left	Right
Stockholm NE	88.0	18.4	98,591	9.2	47.4	8.1	10.5	9.4	2.3	3.6	8.0	1.4	21.0	75.3
Stockholm NW	77.8	13.7	73,396	34.2	28.8	8.5	7.5	3.6	3.8	7.0	4.9	1.6	49.8	44.8
Stockholm S	87.8	20.6	110,012	19.3	30.2	16.8	8.4	6.6	2.6	9.7	4.0	2.3	45.8	49.2
Stockholm SE	82.2	15.4	82,527	29.1	25.6	14.1	6.7	3.9	4.5	10.3	3.7	2.1	53.6	39.8
Stockholm SW	83.7	15.4	82,325	25.6	29.4	14.0	7.2	4.8	3.7	9.4	3.9	2.0	49.0	45.3
Stockholm W	88.7	16.5	88,036	12.6	42.0	10.7	10.6	8.6	2.7	4.5	6.9	1.5	27.7	68.1
Total	85.0	9.0	534,887	20.9	34.3	12.2	8.6	6.3	3.2	7.4	5.3	1.8	40.5	54.5
Source: val.se

==== Stockholm County ====
Location	Turnout	Share	Votes	S	M	MP	FP	C	SD	V	KD	Other	Left	Right
Botkyrka	78.8	5.8	41,378	35.7	30.0	6.9	6.2	2.8	5.0	7.1	5.1	1.4	49.7	44.0
Danderyd	90.5	2.9	20,603	5.8	52.1	3.9	10.1	11.2	1.7	1.2	13.3	0.8	10.9	86.7
Ekerö	90.1	2.2	16,028	13.2	47.1	8.2	9.4	7.3	3.4	3.2	7.1	1.2	24.6	70.9
Haninge	83.0	6.1	43,921	28.0	36.8	7.3	6.9	3.9	5.8	5.0	4.5	1.9	40.4	52.0
Huddinge	83.7	7.5	53,699	24.8	38.7	7.6	7.7	4.4	4.8	5.3	5.2	1.5	37.8	56.0
Järfälla	85.0	5.5	39,735	25.7	36.4	7.8	8.5	4.2	4.8	5.3	6.0	1.4	38.8	55.0
Lidingö	88.9	4.0	28,559	9.2	48.8	5.7	10.7	10.1	2.7	1.9	10.1	0.9	16.8	79.6
Nacka	88.0	7.7	54,930	16.0	43.8	8.7	9.0	7.4	2.8	4.0	6.9	1.3	28.7	67.3
Norrtälje	83.2	5.0	36,152	26.5	36.1	7.2	6.6	8.0	5.1	4.5	4.9	1.3	38.1	55.6
Nykvarn	87.7	0.8	5,648	23.9	41.7	6.1	6.9	5.1	7.3	2.5	5.0	1.5	32.5	58.7
Nynäshamn	84.0	2.3	16,171	29.3	35.0	7.2	6.3	4.5	6.1	5.4	4.8	1.4	41.9	50.6
Salem	87.3	1.3	9,215	22.6	38.6	7.9	9.2	5.7	5.2	4.0	5.4	1.4	34.5	58.9
Sigtuna	82.2	3.2	22,806	27.9	38.2	6.3	7.1	4.5	5.0	3.8	5.9	1.2	38.0	55.7
Sollentuna	87.5	5.5	39,084	17.8	42.2	7.3	9.8	7.0	3.2	3.9	7.7	1.3	28.9	66.7
Solna	84.1	6.0	42,912	20.6	38.1	10.0	9.1	5.8	3.4	6.1	5.4	1.6	36.6	58.3
Sundbyberg	82.7	3.2	23,121	25.9	34.6	9.9	7.9	4.6	4.4	6.9	4.0	1.8	42.7	51.1
Södertälje	79.5	6.3	45,458	34.0	29.5	8.3	6.2	3.9	5.6	5.2	5.4	2.0	47.5	44.9
Tyresö	87.1	3.6	26,064	21.6	42.2	8.2	8.4	4.8	4.1	4.0	5.5	1.3	33.7	60.9
Täby	88.9	5.7	41,136	10.8	50.8	5.2	11.5	7.8	2.3	1.9	8.8	1.0	17.9	78.8
Upplands-Bro	84.6	1.9	13,894	27.7	35.1	6.8	8.2	4.2	5.2	4.5	7.0	1.4	39.0	54.5
Upplands Väsby	83.2	3.2	22,900	27.3	36.7	7.0	8.3	4.0	4.8	5.2	5.5	1.3	39.4	54.5
Vallentuna	87.6	2.6	18,307	16.9	44.5	7.7	8.7	7.3	4.0	3.0	6.5	1.4	27.6	67.0
Vaxholm	89.7	1.0	7,083	12.4	48.5	7.6	9.3	8.5	2.7	3.1	6.9	1.2	23.0	73.1
Värmdö	87.7	3.2	23,152	17.6	45.9	8.6	7.6	5.8	4.1	3.6	5.4	1.3	29.8	64.8
Österåker	87.3	3.4	24,393	17.8	45.5	7.5	9.2	5.8	3.5	3.3	6.2	1.2	28.7	66.6
Total	85.0	12.0	716,349	22.2	40.0	7.5	8.3	5.8	4.2	4.4	6.3	1.4	34.1	60.3
Source: val.se

=== Södermanland ===
Location	Turnout	Share	Votes	S	M	MP	FP	C	SD	V	KD	Other	Left	Right
Eskilstuna	83.3	34.2	58,588	35.9	26.2	7.9	6.7	4.6	7.9	5.4	4.4	1.0	49.2	41.9
Flen	84.7	5.9	10,141	38.7	24.2	5.9	4.8	8.2	6.9	5.5	4.9	0.9	50.1	42.1
Gnesta	85.3	3.9	6,603	28.7	29.5	9.8	5.8	8.9	6.0	5.7	4.0	1.6	44.2	48.2
Katrineholm	84.7	12.1	20,708	38.4	25.0	7.6	6.8	6.3	6.3	4.6	4.3	0.8	50.6	42.3
Nyköping	85.9	19.8	33,999	34.4	27.9	8.2	7.0	6.0	5.3	4.8	5.4	1.1	47.3	46.3
Oxelösund	85.0	4.3	7,434	44.2	23.1	7.2	5.3	2.8	4.8	7.8	3.3	1.4	59.2	34.6
Strängnäs	85.5	12.0	20,626	26.8	35.2	6.7	7.7	6.7	6.4	4.2	5.4	1.0	37.7	55.0
Trosa	87.9	4.4	7,487	23.5	41.3	7.4	7.0	5.2	5.8	3.5	5.4	1.0	34.4	58.8
Vingåker	85.9	3.4	5,841	41.5	24.1	6.5	4.1	6.9	7.3	4.1	4.7	0.9	52.0	39.8
Total	84.8	2.9	171,427	34.7	27.9	7.6	6.6	5.8	6.6	5.0	4.7	1.0	47.3	45.0
Source: val.se

=== Uppsala ===
Location	Turnout	Share	Votes	S	M	MP	FP	C	SD	V	KD	Other	Left	Right
Enköping	84.3	11.7	25,161	29.1	34.8	6.0	5.3	10.0	5.4	3.6	4.6	1.1	38.7	54.8
Heby	81.7	3.9	8,322	33.9	23.8	4.3	5.2	14.4	7.0	4.8	5.5	1.3	42.9	48.8
Håbo	86.1	5.6	11,959	24.9	42.6	5.5	7.2	5.0	5.9	3.1	4.7	1.1	33.5	59.6
Knivsta	88.3	4.2	8,981	19.2	38.3	7.4	9.5	9.2	4.4	3.5	7.1	1.5	30.0	64.1
Tierp	84.0	6.0	12,907	42.9	20.6	4.7	4.6	10.4	6.3	5.4	3.7	1.6	52.9	39.2
Uppsala	86.6	59.6	128,059	24.0	29.5	11.2	9.2	7.6	3.8	6.4	6.4	2.0	41.5	52.7
Älvkarleby	84.8	2.7	5,874	48.9	19.3	5.2	5.0	3.2	7.9	6.8	2.5	1.0	60.9	30.1
Östhammar	83.1	6.4	13,767	35.3	28.2	4.4	5.8	10.7	5.5	4.5	4.2	1.3	44.2	48.9
Total	85.8	3.6	215,030	27.4	30.1	8.8	7.9	8.3	4.7	5.5	5.7	1.7	41.7	52.0
Source: val.se

=== Värmland ===
Location	Turnout	Share	Votes	S	M	MP	FP	C	SD	V	KD	Other	Left	Right
Arvika	82.1	9.3	16,482	39.0	23.6	6.3	5.5	8.4	5.2	6.5	4.3	1.1	51.9	41.7
Eda	78.5	2.5	4,348	43.0	22.7	2.8	3.8	12.3	5.7	4.7	4.0	1.1	50.4	42.8
Filipstad	82.6	3.9	6,837	51.8	18.6	3.6	4.1	3.8	6.2	8.2	2.8	0.9	63.6	29.3
Forshaga	86.4	4.2	7,445	47.2	21.1	4.9	5.1	6.0	5.2	5.4	4.3	0.9	57.4	36.5
Grums	82.0	3.3	5,819	48.8	20.9	3.7	3.9	7.3	5.5	5.3	3.4	1.3	57.8	35.5
Hagfors	82.8	4.6	8,225	53.6	14.4	2.6	4.1	7.1	5.3	9.2	2.2	1.7	65.3	27.7
Hammarö	88.9	5.6	9,898	35.1	31.5	5.8	7.5	4.5	3.9	5.0	5.6	1.2	45.9	49.0
Karlstad	86.1	32.6	57,709	32.9	29.9	8.0	7.5	5.5	4.2	5.5	5.3	1.2	46.4	48.3
Kil	85.2	4.3	7,650	38.0	26.0	5.3	5.6	9.1	4.7	5.2	5.1	1.0	48.5	45.8
Kristinehamn	84.6	9.0	15,925	40.6	25.4	5.5	6.1	6.1	4.5	6.3	4.4	1.1	52.4	42.0
Munkfors	83.9	1.4	2,484	56.1	11.8	2.6	5.9	7.3	4.9	6.6	2.9	1.9	65.3	27.8
Storfors	84.4	1.6	2,750	50.8	18.0	3.5	3.3	6.4	5.7	7.3	3.9	1.1	61.6	31.6
Sunne	83.4	4.9	8,651	32.6	27.4	4.1	4.9	16.8	4.1	4.5	4.4	1.1	41.2	53.6
Säffle	82.3	5.6	9,978	33.6	27.4	4.4	5.6	12.1	6.4	3.9	5.9	0.7	41.8	51.1
Torsby	79.8	4.4	7,766	44.3	24.3	2.8	3.5	8.8	4.2	7.2	3.1	1.8	54.3	39.7
Årjäng	77.9	3.0	5,248	31.7	24.4	3.0	7.4	14.3	6.6	3.3	8.4	1.0	38.0	54.5
Total	84.1	3.0	177,215	38.9	25.7	5.6	6.0	7.6	4.8	5.8	4.7	1.2	50.1	44.0
Source: val.se

=== Västerbotten ===
Location	Turnout	Share	Votes	S	M	MP	FP	C	SD	V	KD	Other	Left	Right
Bjurholm	83.2	0.9	1,599	36.2	26.6	1.9	8.1	14.1	2.4	3.6	6.5	0.6	41.7	55.3
Dorotea	80.6	1.1	1,831	54.6	11.4	0.8	7.5	9.3	2.9	9.5	2.6	1.4	64.9	30.8
Lycksele	82.6	4.7	8,072	49.3	16.8	3.3	5.1	4.4	3.6	8.6	8.1	0.6	61.2	34.5
Malå	82.5	1.2	2,111	52.5	14.5	2.6	6.7	3.5	2.7	12.7	4.2	0.7	67.8	28.8
Nordmaling	83.0	2.7	4,679	45.5	17.3	3.3	6.7	10.6	3.3	7.2	5.4	0.7	56.0	40.0
Norsjö	81.4	1.6	2,729	48.4	11.3	2.8	5.5	9.9	2.4	12.5	5.9	1.4	63.7	32.6
Robertsfors	85.3	2.7	4,556	40.8	13.5	4.3	3.8	20.7	2.4	7.4	6.0	1.1	52.5	44.0
Skellefteå	85.6	28.1	48,020	49.6	14.3	5.8	5.7	6.0	2.9	9.5	5.4	0.9	64.9	31.3
Sorsele	77.4	0.9	1,619	42.4	15.3	3.3	3.5	11.4	4.0	11.9	7.5	0.8	57.5	37.7
Storuman	78.7	2.3	3,911	42.2	18.2	3.5	5.5	9.7	3.3	9.0	7.6	1.2	54.6	40.9
Umeå	87.0	44.4	75,759	35.3	20.9	10.5	6.6	6.8	2.3	11.1	4.8	1.8	56.9	39.0
Vilhelmina	84.1	2.7	4,653	51.8	11.7	2.8	4.7	6.7	4.3	8.4	6.1	3.6	62.9	29.2
Vindeln	82.6	2.1	3,621	41.1	20.3	3.1	5.8	13.0	3.2	5.8	6.7	1.0	50.0	45.8
Vännäs	84.6	3.2	5,434	40.8	18.3	5.0	5.3	11.3	2.6	10.4	5.5	0.9	56.2	40.3
Åsele	83.3	1.2	2,004	51.2	13.6	1.9	5.8	9.6	3.9	7.4	5.4	1.2	60.5	34.4
Total	85.4	2.9	170,598	42.2	17.7	7.2	6.0	7.4	2.7	10.0	5.4	1.4	59.4	36.5
Source: val.se

=== Västernorrland ===
Location	Turnout	Share	Votes	S	M	MP	FP	C	SD	V	KD	Other	Left	Right
Härnösand	83.6	10.1	16,149	40.2	22.4	8.1	5.5	7.4	4.0	6.4	4.1	1.9	54.7	39.4
Kramfors	84.1	8.0	12,835	50.5	15.7	4.6	3.1	9.9	3.1	8.4	3.4	1.3	63.6	32.1
Sollefteå	83.8	8.5	13,520	52.3	15.5	4.6	3.5	6.4	4.5	7.0	2.7	3.5	63.9	28.1
Sundsvall	84.7	39.1	62,481	38.4	26.3	6.3	6.7	5.1	5.5	6.0	3.9	1.9	50.7	42.0
Timrå	84.3	7.2	11,450	49.8	18.5	3.8	4.9	5.5	6.0	7.3	2.9	1.3	60.9	31.8
Ånge	82.5	4.1	6,578	49.8	18.9	3.2	3.2	7.7	5.9	6.9	2.9	1.6	59.9	32.7
Örnsköldsvik	85.8	23.1	36,962	46.9	19.0	4.5	4.2	9.5	3.0	4.1	6.9	1.8	55.6	39.6
Total	84.6	2.7	159,975	44.0	21.6	5.5	5.2	7.0	4.5	6.0	4.4	1.9	55.5	38.1
Source: val.se

=== Västmanland ===
Location	Turnout	Share	Votes	S	M	MP	FP	C	SD	V	KD	Other	Left	Right
Arboga	83.6	5.3	8,565	37.6	26.4	6.3	6.8	5.8	6.0	5.7	4.5	1.0	49.5	43.5
Fagersta	82.1	4.7	7,605	44.4	21.2	5.1	4.9	3.4	7.7	8.8	3.7	0.9	58.3	33.1
Hallstahammar	82.4	5.7	9,203	47.0	20.4	4.8	6.1	3.5	5.7	7.3	4.3	1.1	59.0	34.3
Kungsör	84.8	3.3	5,206	35.3	27.3	5.0	7.0	6.9	7.1	5.7	4.8	1.0	46.0	45.9
Köping	82.6	9.7	15,546	41.0	23.5	5.1	5.4	6.4	7.0	6.8	3.9	1.0	52.8	39.1
Norberg	84.1	2.3	3,729	42.4	20.0	5.8	4.7	4.6	7.4	11.0	2.9	1.1	59.3	32.3
Sala	84.3	8.8	14,084	33.5	26.3	5.9	6.0	11.3	6.4	4.8	4.9	1.0	44.1	48.5
Skinnskatteberg	84.4	1.8	2,950	45.3	17.4	5.3	7.8	6.4	6.7	7.4	2.9	0.9	58.0	34.4
Surahammar	83.5	3.8	6,159	49.1	19.4	4.1	5.7	2.8	7.0	7.9	2.9	1.1	61.1	30.7
Västerås	85.2	54.4	87,096	32.7	30.4	6.4	8.9	4.3	5.9	4.8	5.1	1.6	43.9	48.6
Total	84.4	2.7	160,143	36.4	27.1	5.9	7.5	5.2	6.2	5.7	4.6	1.4	48.0	44.4
Source: val.se

=== Västra Götaland ===
==== Gothenburg ====
Location	Turnout	Share	Votes	S	M	MP	FP	C	SD	V	KD	Other	Left	Right
Gothenburg	82.7	100.0	319,302	25.2	30.4	10.7	8.4	3.8	4.9	8.5	6.1	2.0	44.5	48.7
Total	82.7	5.4	319,302	25.2	30.4	10.7	8.4	3.8	4.9	8.5	6.1	2.0	44.5	48.7
Source: val.se

==== Västra Götaland E ====
Location	Turnout	Share	Votes	S	M	MP	FP	C	SD	V	KD	Other	Left	Right
Essunga	85.6	2.2	3,686	29.3	31.4	4.2	5.1	12.6	6.2	3.9	6.4	1.0	37.4	55.5
Falköping	84.7	12.1	20,367	31.2	27.8	5.3	5.2	9.3	7.8	4.7	7.8	0.9	41.2	50.1
Grästorp	86.5	2.3	3,834	30.5	31.6	3.6	5.2	14.1	6.3	3.5	4.2	1.0	37.6	55.1
Gullspång	84.7	2.1	3,497	43.9	22.7	3.7	4.9	7.5	6.2	5.1	5.4	0.7	52.6	40.4
Götene	86.9	5.2	8,694	34.5	25.5	6.4	6.2	8.7	4.8	4.9	8.2	0.9	45.8	48.6
Hjo	86.0	3.5	5,950	30.8	28.8	6.6	7.5	7.3	5.2	4.6	8.4	0.8	41.9	52.1
Karlsborg	86.2	2.7	4,626	33.6	26.9	4.4	7.7	11.0	5.8	3.4	6.6	0.7	41.3	52.1
Lidköping	87.1	15.3	25,782	35.3	26.3	6.4	6.7	7.1	5.1	5.7	6.5	0.8	47.4	46.8
Mariestad	83.8	9.2	15,526	37.1	28.1	6.1	5.6	5.3	5.2	5.9	5.7	1.0	49.1	44.6
Skara	85.3	7.1	12,038	34.4	29.4	6.3	5.8	7.3	5.6	4.6	5.5	1.1	45.3	48.0
Skövde	85.3	19.8	33,360	31.0	30.3	6.3	7.3	7.5	5.3	4.7	6.3	1.3	42.0	51.4
Tibro	84.9	4.0	6,823	36.4	23.4	4.4	7.2	7.3	6.4	4.3	10.0	0.6	45.1	47.9
Tidaholm	86.1	5.0	8,394	43.8	22.0	4.8	5.0	6.8	6.2	5.4	5.2	0.8	54.1	38.9
Töreboda	81.9	3.4	5,763	37.6	24.8	4.3	3.9	11.6	6.5	5.1	5.3	0.9	47.1	45.6
Vara	83.9	6.1	10,221	28.3	33.0	3.7	5.6	12.4	5.8	4.2	6.2	0.8	36.1	57.2
Total	85.3	2.8	168,561	33.9	27.9	5.6	6.2	8.3	5.8	4.9	6.6	1.0	44.4	48.9
Source: val.se

==== Västra Götaland N ====
Location	Turnout	Share	Votes	S	M	MP	FP	C	SD	V	KD	Other	Left	Right
Ale	85.0	9.8	16,898	33.0	28.2	6.0	6.5	5.0	8.1	6.1	5.8	1.4	45.1	45.4
Alingsås	87.3	14.5	25,090	25.7	27.9	9.5	10.0	6.2	4.8	6.2	8.7	1.1	41.4	52.8
Bengtsfors	80.5	3.5	6,005	38.5	23.1	4.9	5.2	10.9	5.7	5.2	5.9	0.8	48.5	45.1
Dals-Ed	81.1	1.6	2,813	28.4	27.2	3.7	4.6	15.8	6.1	3.9	9.2	1.0	36.0	56.8
Färgelanda	83.6	2.4	4,217	34.1	24.5	3.0	4.9	14.9	8.6	4.1	5.2	0.8	41.2	49.5
Herrljunga	85.6	3.5	6,079	27.2	24.8	5.3	7.2	13.0	7.9	4.9	9.0	0.7	37.3	54.0
Lerum	89.6	14.4	24,930	22.3	35.1	8.8	10.1	5.1	5.4	5.1	7.0	1.2	36.2	57.2
Lilla Edet	81.8	4.5	7,714	37.9	22.3	4.7	6.0	6.5	10.1	7.3	3.8	1.4	49.9	38.6
Mellerud	81.8	3.3	5,769	29.7	26.5	4.5	6.1	13.3	7.7	5.0	6.5	0.8	39.3	52.3
Trollhättan	84.8	19.9	34,379	42.0	24.1	6.8	7.4	3.7	4.9	5.8	4.4	1.0	54.6	39.5
Vårgårda	86.5	4.1	7,077	26.6	23.2	6.2	8.2	11.9	5.9	4.1	13.2	0.9	36.9	56.4
Vänersborg	85.2	13.9	24,028	34.0	26.0	7.1	7.5	5.8	6.3	6.7	5.4	1.2	47.9	44.6
Åmål	81.3	4.5	7,861	39.7	24.8	6.1	6.0	6.6	5.5	5.3	5.2	0.8	51.1	42.6
Total	85.3	2.9	172,860	32.4	27.0	6.9	7.8	6.6	6.1	5.7	6.4	1.1	45.1	47.7
Source: val.se

==== Västra Götaland S ====
Location	Turnout	Share	Votes	S	M	MP	FP	C	SD	V	KD	Other	Left	Right
Bollebygd	87.6	4.5	5,468	26.6	33.1	6.1	6.5	7.2	8.2	4.7	6.6	1.0	37.4	53.4
Borås	84.6	53.8	65,193	31.9	29.1	6.5	7.7	4.7	7.1	5.6	6.2	1.3	44.0	47.7
Mark	85.7	18.0	21,770	34.0	24.5	5.7	7.6	9.3	5.8	5.6	6.7	0.9	45.3	48.0
Svenljunga	83.5	5.3	6,427	29.3	29.0	3.8	6.5	14.1	7.9	3.1	5.2	1.0	36.3	54.8
Tranemo	85.9	6.1	7,443	32.0	26.7	4.9	5.9	14.1	6.9	3.1	5.5	0.9	40.0	52.2
Ulricehamn	85.7	12.3	14,886	26.2	29.4	6.1	6.8	12.2	6.7	3.9	7.9	0.9	36.2	56.2
Total	85.1	2.0	121,187	31.2	28.3	6.0	7.3	7.7	6.9	5.1	6.4	1.1	42.3	49.7
Source: val.se

==== Västra Götaland W ====
Location	Turnout	Share	Votes	S	M	MP	FP	C	SD	V	KD	Other	Left	Right
Härryda	88.1	9.5	21,491	21.9	36.3	7.6	10.5	6.0	5.6	4.6	6.4	1.2	34.1	59.1
Kungälv	88.3	12.2	27,502	26.0	33.2	6.3	9.1	6.6	6.2	4.4	7.1	1.0	36.8	56.0
Lysekil	84.2	4.3	9,688	36.7	25.6	6.5	10.0	4.2	5.8	5.6	4.7	0.9	48.8	44.6
Munkedal	82.1	2.8	6,387	32.8	26.0	3.9	5.3	11.8	7.2	5.1	7.0	0.9	41.8	50.1
Mölndal	86.5	17.3	38,981	24.8	32.9	8.5	10.3	4.8	5.6	5.3	6.5	1.4	38.6	54.4
Orust	85.7	4.6	10,431	25.6	33.9	6.4	8.3	8.8	4.7	4.7	6.3	1.2	36.7	57.4
Partille	86.9	9.8	22,136	24.8	33.9	7.6	10.0	4.0	5.8	5.1	7.1	1.7	37.5	54.9
Sotenäs	84.9	2.8	6,269	27.2	39.1	4.3	8.2	4.6	4.2	3.8	8.0	0.7	35.3	59.9
Stenungsund	86.6	6.9	15,546	25.8	36.1	7.1	8.6	5.9	4.9	4.2	6.3	1.3	37.0	56.8
Strömstad	79.0	2.9	6,527	28.0	29.3	8.5	8.6	10.9	4.5	4.2	5.2	0.8	40.6	54.0
Tanum	82.3	3.5	7,901	22.0	32.6	6.3	9.2	15.4	4.4	3.4	5.8	1.0	31.7	63.0
Tjörn	87.5	4.6	10,321	20.4	36.1	5.9	9.9	5.6	5.0	3.0	13.2	0.9	29.3	64.8
Uddevalla	84.7	14.9	33,435	33.4	28.8	7.0	6.6	5.0	6.1	5.2	6.8	1.1	45.6	47.2
Öckerö	89.4	3.7	8,422	18.9	36.2	5.9	8.2	2.8	4.5	3.1	19.3	1.1	27.9	66.5
Total	86.1	3.8	225,037	26.4	32.8	7.0	9.0	6.0	5.6	4.7	7.3	1.2	38.1	55.1
Source: val.se

=== Örebro ===
Location	Turnout	Share	Votes	S	M	MP	FP	C	SD	V	KD	Other	Left	Right
Askersund	84.8	4.2	7,628	39.4	25.6	4.9	4.9	8.1	5.8	4.6	6.0	0.7	48.9	44.5
Degerfors	86.1	3.6	6,494	52.7	13.8	4.9	3.1	4.1	5.4	10.8	4.5	0.7	68.4	25.6
Hallsberg	86.2	5.5	9,955	44.8	20.7	4.9	4.8	6.3	6.7	5.9	5.3	0.8	55.6	37.0
Hällefors	82.7	2.5	4,556	51.2	17.8	4.5	3.6	4.7	7.2	7.2	2.5	1.2	62.9	28.7
Karlskoga	84.3	10.7	19,567	46.3	23.2	5.4	5.3	3.1	4.7	5.3	4.8	1.9	57.0	36.4
Kumla	86.6	7.1	13,022	41.1	23.4	4.7	6.3	5.2	7.2	4.2	6.9	1.0	50.0	41.8
Laxå	84.3	2.1	3,847	49.1	19.5	3.0	5.2	5.7	5.5	5.2	6.3	0.6	57.2	36.7
Lekeberg	86.4	2.6	4,761	30.7	24.8	5.3	4.4	12.9	7.5	4.5	8.9	1.1	40.5	50.9
Lindesberg	84.6	8.1	14,845	38.6	23.5	5.2	5.0	8.0	9.2	4.6	4.8	1.0	48.4	41.3
Ljusnarsberg	80.5	1.7	3,170	44.4	19.4	4.5	3.2	5.5	9.6	7.9	3.6	1.9	56.8	31.7
Nora	84.9	3.7	6,745	40.4	24.2	6.1	6.4	6.2	5.8	4.5	5.5	1.0	51.0	42.3
Örebro	86.2	48.1	87,788	34.1	26.0	8.1	7.6	4.8	5.5	5.8	7.0	1.1	48.1	45.3
Total	85.6	3.1	182,378	38.8	24.0	6.5	6.3	5.4	6.1	5.7	6.2	1.1	51.0	41.8
Source: val.se

=== Östergötland ===
Location	Turnout	Share	Votes	S	M	MP	FP	C	SD	V	KD	Other	Left	Right
Boxholm	87.3	1.3	3,563	45.4	20.2	4.9	3.7	9.1	5.4	5.7	5.1	0.5	56.0	38.1
Finspång	85.2	4.9	13,760	43.9	22.2	5.8	4.6	5.6	5.3	6.1	5.8	0.7	55.8	38.2
Kinda	86.7	2.3	6,527	32.1	25.0	6.3	5.0	13.2	6.3	4.7	6.7	0.7	43.1	49.9
Linköping	87.3	34.3	95,844	27.6	30.6	9.4	8.8	6.4	4.5	4.7	6.4	1.7	41.6	52.1
Mjölby	85.8	6.1	17,022	37.8	26.0	5.8	6.4	6.8	4.8	5.1	5.7	1.6	48.7	44.9
Motala	86.0	9.9	27,738	42.9	24.0	5.2	6.2	4.6	5.7	5.5	4.6	1.3	53.6	39.4
Norrköping	83.9	29.2	81,731	32.5	30.2	7.9	6.0	4.7	6.1	5.7	5.2	1.8	46.1	46.0
Söderköping	85.8	3.3	9,336	26.2	33.7	7.1	5.9	10.0	5.0	4.2	6.6	1.3	37.6	56.1
Vadstena	88.0	1.9	5,197	32.9	31.1	6.6	6.8	6.2	5.0	3.9	6.7	0.9	43.4	50.8
Valdemarsvik	85.0	1.9	5,331	37.0	26.2	4.4	4.2	11.9	6.4	4.1	5.2	0.6	45.5	47.5
Ydre	88.7	0.9	2,568	28.2	25.6	4.9	5.1	16.0	5.8	2.9	11.3	0.4	35.9	57.9
Åtvidaberg	86.2	2.7	7,642	41.4	25.2	5.2	4.8	8.2	5.0	4.4	5.1	0.6	51.0	43.4
Ödeshög	85.5	1.2	3,482	31.2	26.5	5.9	3.8	9.6	5.9	3.8	12.4	0.9	40.9	52.3
Total	85.8	4.7	279,741	33.0	28.7	7.6	6.8	6.3	5.3	5.1	5.9	1.5	45.6	47.6
Source: val.se
