= Fredrik Bryngelsson =

Swedish retired footballer

Personal information
- Full name: Hans Arne Fredrik Bryngelsson
- Date of birth: 10 April 1975 (age 51)
- Place of birth: Sweden
- Position: Defender

Senior career*
Years	Team	Apps	(Gls)
- Norrby IF
1998–2000	BK Häcken	10+	(0)
2000–2002	Stockport County F.C.	8	(0)
2002–20xx	Shrewsbury Town F.C.	0	(0)
20xx	Rochdale A.F.C.		
2003–2004	Raufoss IL	33	(0)
20xx–2008	Norrby IF		
20xx–2011	Bollebygds IF	18+	(1+)
2013	Hestrafors IF	5	(1)
- * Club domestic league appearances and goals

Fredrik Bryngelsson (born 10 April 1975) is a Swedish retired footballer who now works as co-owner of the Business & Sports Club in his home country.

== Career ==
Bryngelsson started his senior career with Norrby IF. In 2000, he signed for Stockport County in the English Football League First Division, where he made ten appearances and scored zero goals. After that, he played for English club Shrewsbury Town, Norwegian club Raufoss IL,
