= Bollebygds IF =

Swedish football club

- Full name: Bollebygds Idrottsförening
- Nickname: BIF
- Founded: 1907
- Ground: Björnskogsvallen; Bollebygd; Sweden
- Chairman: Dragorad Vasic
- Head coach: Tobias Edenvik
- Coach: Jens Ljungcrantz
- League: Division 3 Mellersta Götaland
- 2009: Division 3 Mellersta Götaland, 4th
Home colours

Bollebygds IF is a Swedish football club located in Bollebygd in Bollebygd Municipality, Västra Götaland County.

== Background ==
Bollebygds Idrottsförening is a sports club in Bollebygd that was formed in 1907. The club has specialised in football, athletics and gymnastics.

Since their foundation Bollebygds IF has participated mainly in the lower divisions of the Swedish football league system. The club currently plays in Division 3 Mellersta Götaland which is the fifth tier of Swedish football. They play their home matches at the Björnskogsvallen in Bollebygd.

Bollebygds IF are affiliated to the Västergötlands Fotbollförbund.

The most famous football player who has played for Bollebygds IF is Glenn Martindahl who won the Allsvenskan play-off with Örgryte IS in 1985.

== Season to season ==
Season	Level	Division	Section	Position	Movements
1999	Tier 6	Division 5	Sydvästra Älvsborg	8th	
2000	Tier 6	Division 5	Sydvästra Älvsborg	2nd	
2001	Tier 6	Division 5	Västergötland Mellersta	3rd	
2002	Tier 6	Division 5	Västergötland Södra	8th	
2003	Tier 6	Division 5	Västergötland Sydvästra	9th	
2004	Tier 6	Division 5	Västergötland Sydvästra	8th	
2005	Tier 6	Division 5	Västergötland Sydvästra	1st	Promoted
2006*	Tier 6	Division 4	Västergötland Södra	8th	
2007	Tier 6	Division 4	Västergötland Södra	9th	
2008	Tier 6	Division 4	Västergötland Södra	1st	Promoted
2009	Tier 5	Division 3	Mellersta Götaland	4th	
2010	Tier 5	Division 3	Mellersta Götaland	8th	

* League restructuring in 2006 resulted in a new division being created at Tier 3 and subsequent divisions dropping a level.

== Attendances ==
In recent seasons Bollebygds IF have had the following average attendances:

Season	Average attendance	Division / Section	Level
2008	Not available	Div 4 Västergötland Södra	Tier 6
2009	190	Div 3 Mellersta Götaland	Tier 5
2010	125	Div 3 Mellersta Götaland	Tier 5

* Attendances are provided in the Publikliga sections of the Svenska Fotbollförbundet website.
