= Töllsjö =

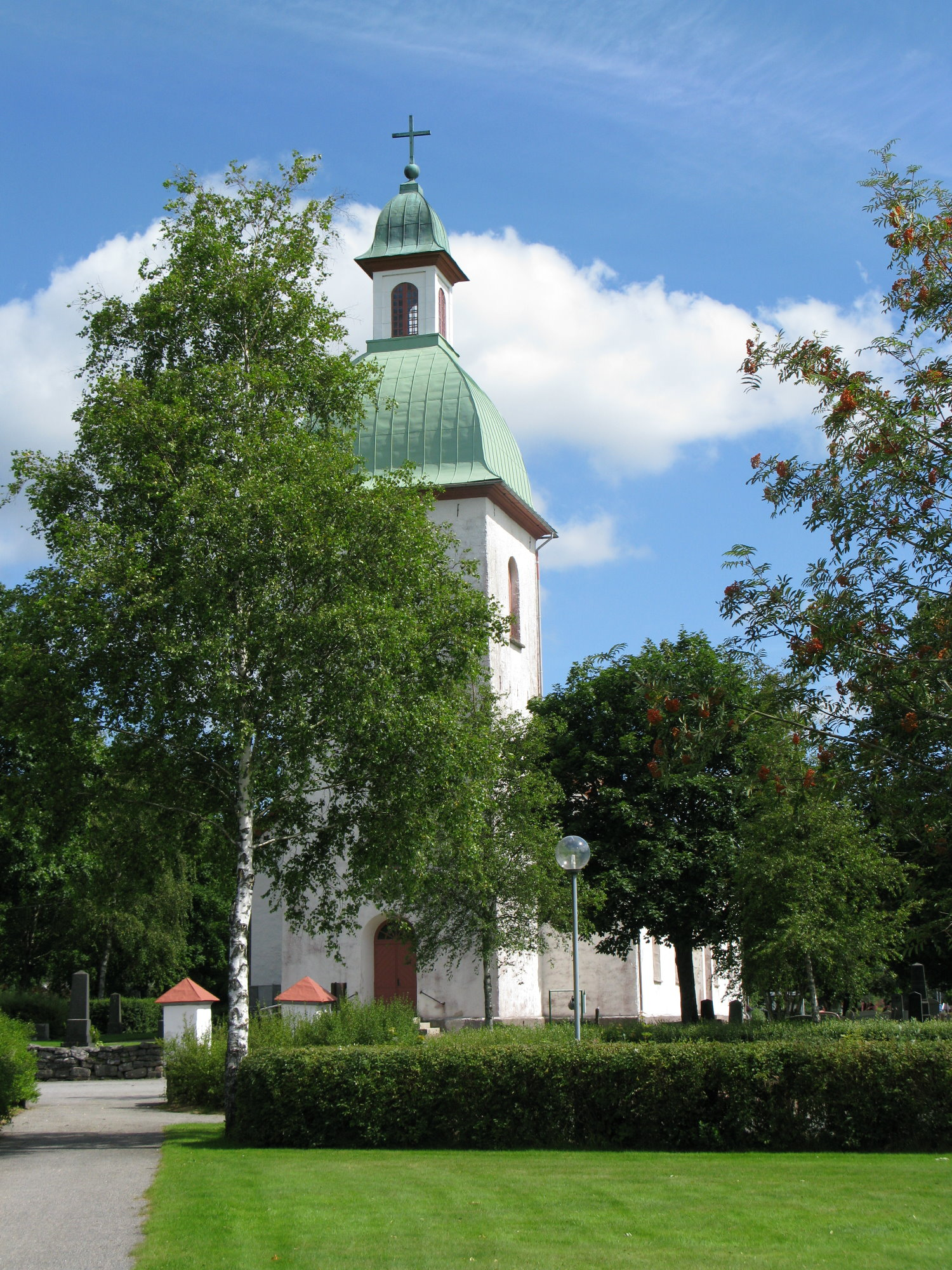
- Töllsjö kyrka

- Location within Västra Götaland Location within Sweden
- Coordinates: 57°48′N 12°38′E
- Country: Sweden
- Province: Västergötland
- County: Västra Götaland County
- Municipality: Bollebygd Municipality

Area
  - Total: 0.45 km^{2} (0.17 sq mi)

Population (31 December 2010)
  - Total: 369
  - Density: 829/km^{2} (2,150/sq mi)
- Time zone: UTC+1 (CET)
  - Summer (DST): UTC+2 (CEST)

Töllsjö is a locality situated in Bollebygd Municipality, Västra Götaland County, Sweden. It had 369 inhabitants in 2010.
