= Bollebygd =

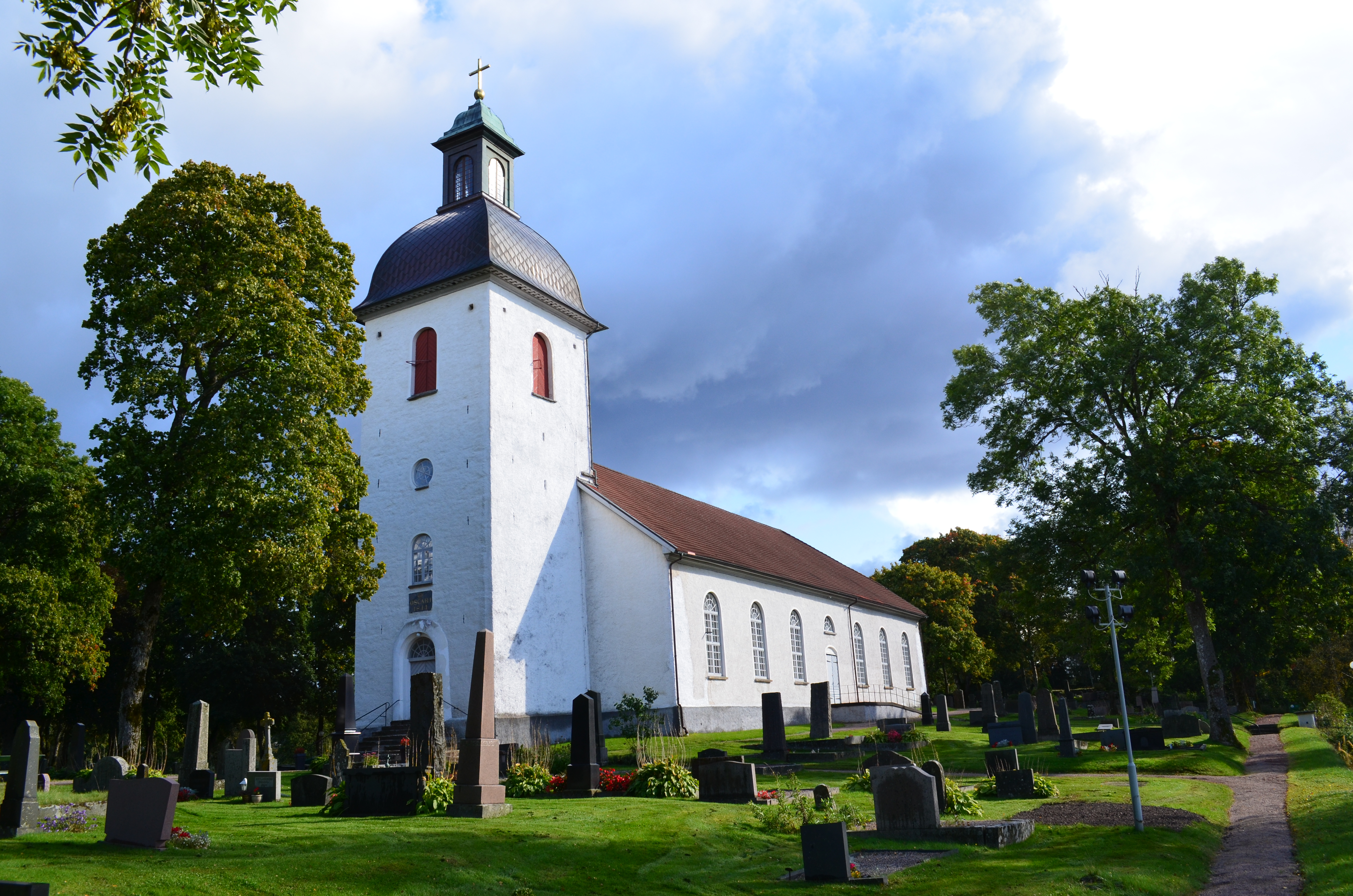
- Bollebygd Church

- Location within Västra Götaland Location within Sweden
- Coordinates: 57°40′N 12°34′E
- Country: Sweden
- Province: Västergötland
- County: Västra Götaland County
- Municipality: Bollebygd Municipality

Area
  - Total: 2.57 km^{2} (0.99 sq mi)

Population (31 December 2010)
  - Total: 3,566
  - Density: 1,389/km^{2} (3,600/sq mi)
- Time zone: UTC+1 (CET)
  - Summer (DST): UTC+2 (CEST)

Bollebygd is a locality and the seat of Bollebygd Municipality, Västra Götaland County, Sweden. It had 3,566 inhabitants in 2010. Between 1974 and 1994 it was in Borås Municipality.

== Sports ==
The following sports clubs are located in Bollebygd:

- Bollebygds IF
- Hestrafors IF
