= Hultafors =

- Location within Västra Götaland Location within Sweden
- Coordinates: 57°42′N 12°44′E
- Country: Sweden
- Province: Västergötland
- County: Västra Götaland County
- Municipality: Bollebygd Municipality

Area
  - Total: 0.57 km^{2} (0.22 sq mi)

Population (31 December 2010)
  - Total: 227
  - Density: 395/km^{2} (1,020/sq mi)
- Time zone: UTC+1 (CET)
  - Summer (DST): UTC+2 (CEST)

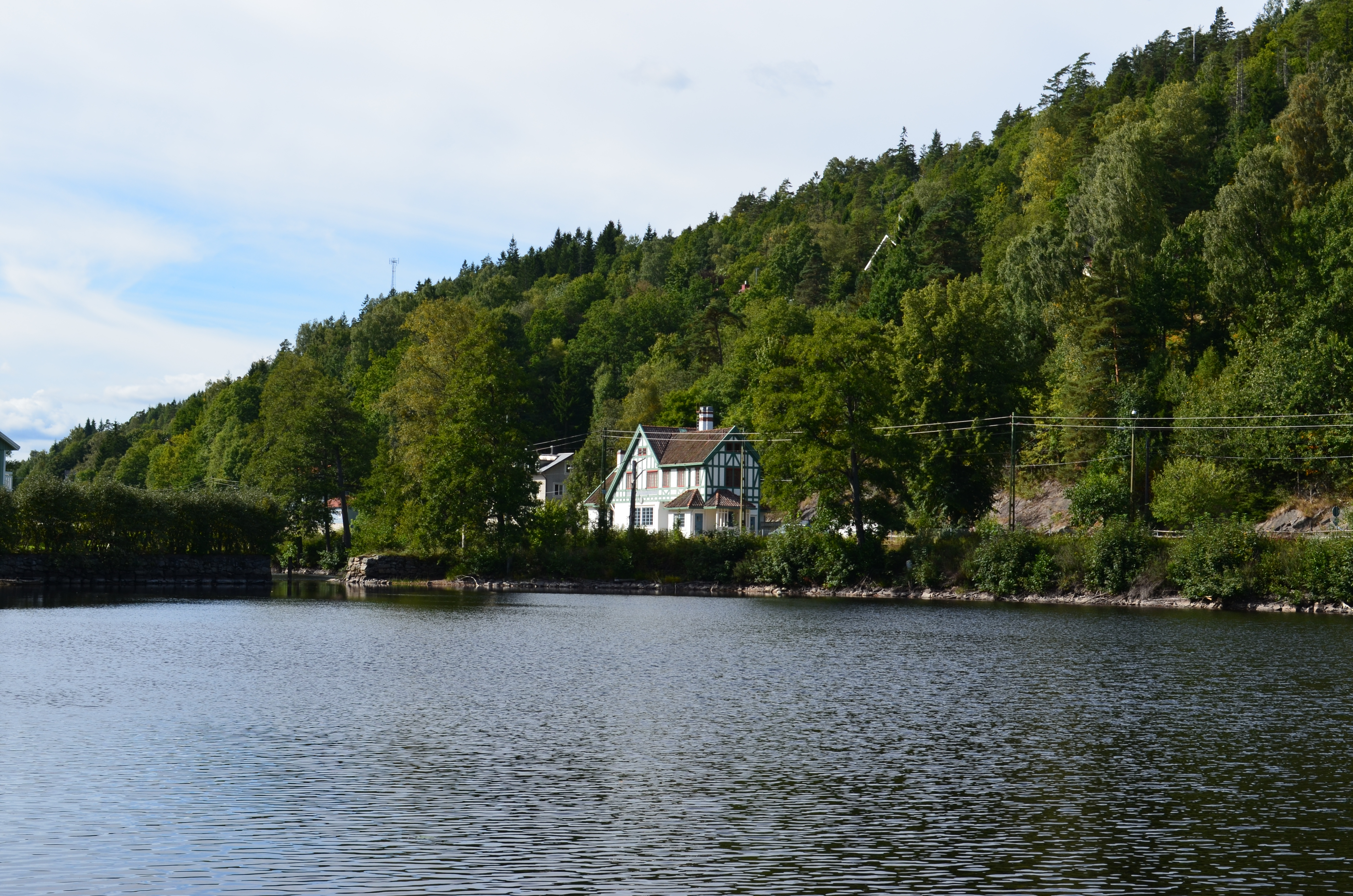

Hultafors (Swedish pronunciation: [hɵltaˈfɔʂː]) is a locality situated in Bollebygd Municipality, Västra Götaland County, Sweden. It had 227 inhabitants in 2010.
