= Bollebygd Municipality =

Bollebygd Municipality Bollebygds kommun
- Municipality
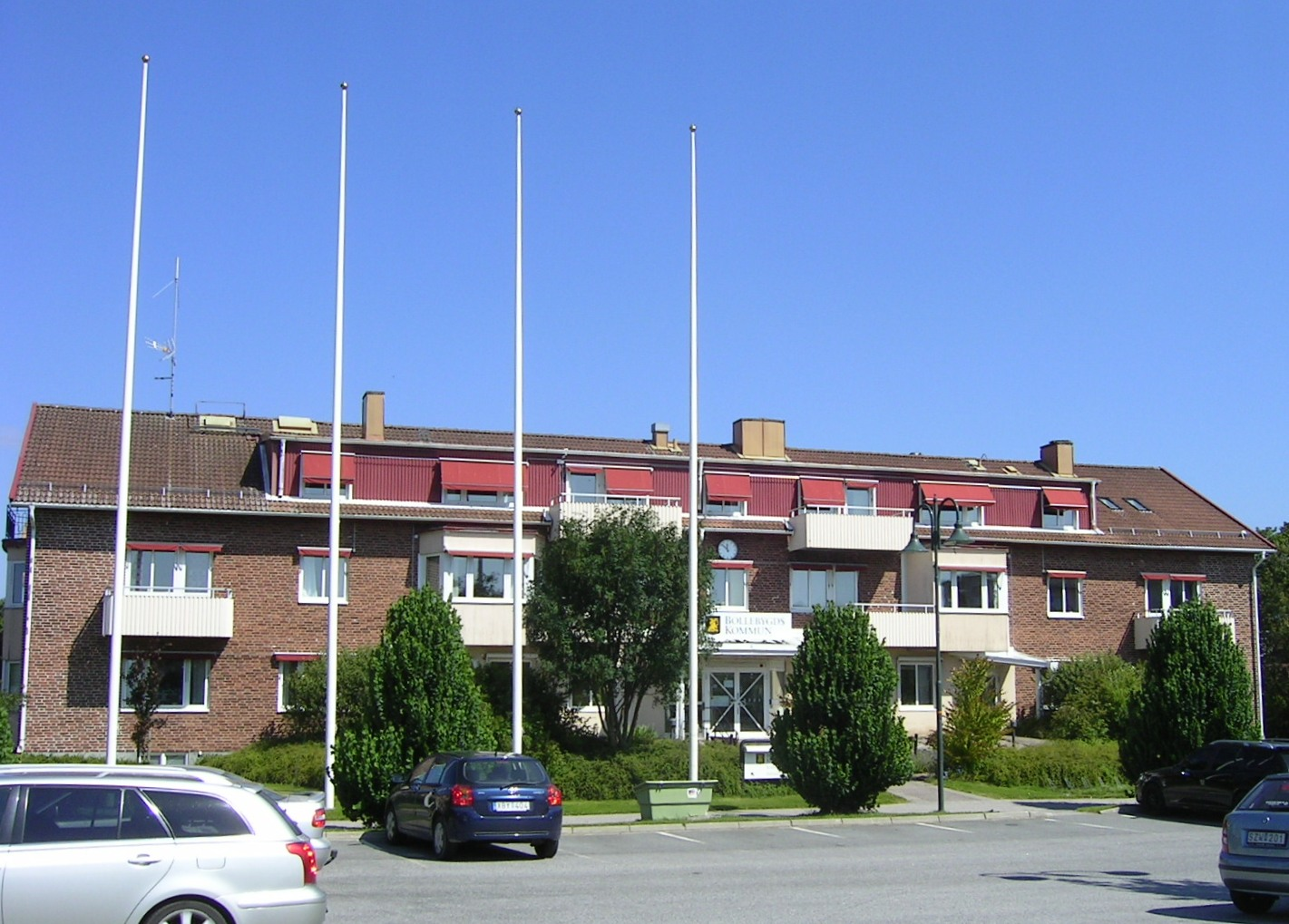
- Bollebygd town hall

- Coat of arms

- Coordinates: 57°40′N 12°34′E
- Country: Sweden
- County: Västra Götaland County
- Seat: Bollebygd

Area
  - Total: 282.39 km^{2} (109.03 sq mi)
  - Land: 263.19 km^{2} (101.62 sq mi)
  - Water: 19.2 km^{2} (7.4 sq mi)
- Area as of 1 January 2014.

Population (30 June 2025)
  - Total: 9,790
  - Density: 37.2/km^{2} (96.3/sq mi)
- Time zone: UTC+1 (CET)
  - Summer (DST): UTC+2 (CEST)
- ISO 3166 code: SE
- Province: Västergötland
- Municipal code: 1443
- Website: www.bollebygd.se
- Density is calculated using land area only.

Bollebygd Municipality (Swedish: Bollebygds kommun) is a municipality in Västra Götaland County in western Sweden. Its seat is located in the town of Bollebygd.

The municipal reform of 1952 united "old" Bollebygd with Töllsjö. The next reform placed Bollebygd within Borås Municipality from 1974. In 1995 Bollebygd was re-established as a municipality in the borders of 1952.

== Localities ==
Population as of 2011-12-31:

- Bollebygd 4,170
- Olsfors 652
- Töllsjö 347
- Hultafors 293
- Rural population 2,894

== Demographics ==
This is a demographic table based on Bollebygd Municipality's electoral districts in the 2022 Swedish general election sourced from SVT's election platform, in turn taken from SCB official statistics.

In total there were 9,616 residents, including 7,202 Swedish citizens of voting age. 40.3% voted for the left coalition and 58.5% for the right coalition. Indicators are in percentage points except population totals and income.

Location	Residents	Citizen adults	Left vote	Right vote	Employed	Swedish parents	Foreign heritage	Income SEK	Degree
Location			%	%					
Bollebygd S	2,393	1,830	40.6	58.4	84	84	16	26,636	35
Bollebygd V	2,438	1,839	36.0	62.7	87	90	10	31,000	46
Bollebygd Ö	1,971	1,460	44.8	54.2	86	87	13	28,471	50
Olsfors	1,579	1,156	43.1	55.8	83	82	18	27,070	31
Töllsjö	1,235	917	39.2	59.5	86	87	13	25,960	33
Source: SVT
