= Tommy Lycén =

Swedish footballer

Personal information
- Date of birth: 5 October 1981 (age 43)
- Place of birth: Rångedala
- Position(s): midfielder

Senior career*
Years	Team	Apps	(Gls)
–1996	Rångedala IK		
1997–2002	Brämhults IK		
2003–2004	Grimsås IF		
2005–2006	IFK Göteborg		
2006	→ Umeå FC (loan)		
2007	IF Brommapojkarna		
2007	→ Örgryte IS (loan)		
2008–2011	GAIS		
2011–2012	Örgryte IS		
2013	Utsiktens BK		
2014–2015	Västra Frölunda IF		
2018	Assyriska BK		
- *Club domestic league appearances and goals

Tommy Lycén (born 5 October 1981 in Rångedala near Borås) is a Swedish football midfielder.

After playing for local clubs and Grimsås IF, he joined IFK Göteborg in 2005. The season 2006 he was on loan to Umeå FC in Superettan. He was sold to IF Brommapojkarna in late 2006 and played with them in Allsvenskan, the highest division in Swedish football, but went on loan to Swedish second division team Örgryte IS a bit into the season. He signed for Allsvenskan team GAIS in 2007. In Gais Lycén had several injury problems, and in 2011 Gais decided to not extend his contract. Instead he signed for Örgryte IS in August 2011.
