= Sjömarken =

- Location within Västra Götaland Location within Sweden
- Coordinates: 57°43′N 12°50′E
- Country: Sweden
- Province: Västergötland
- County: Västra Götaland County
- Municipality: Borås Municipality

Area
  - Total: 2.25 km^{2} (0.87 sq mi)

Population (31 December 2010)
  - Total: 2,829
  - Density: 1,255/km^{2} (3,250/sq mi)
- Time zone: UTC+1 (CET)
  - Summer (DST): UTC+2 (CEST)

Sjömarken is a locality situated in Borås Municipality, Västra Götaland County, Sweden. It had 2,829 inhabitants in 2010.

Here you can find a pizzeria, a kiosk, an antique store, a boat store, a squash hall, and a very active sports club, with football (soccer) and table tennis as main sports, a number of companies and a beach, "Sjömarkensbadet".

== Lake Viared ==
Sjömarken is situated at the Lake Viared, which is about 200–600 meters wide and about 6 kilometers long. Along the lake is a number of beaches in Sjömarken, Lyckebo, Viareds Sommarstad, Sandared and Hultafors. There are two sand beaches in Sjömarken, the large beach, and the small beach, which is very shallow and ideal for small children.

=== Images ===
Sjömarken Beach

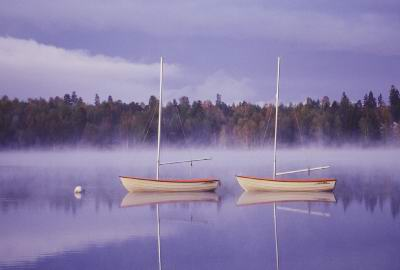
Boats at Lake Viared

Children swimming at Lake Viared

Morning at Lake Viared

Large Beach at Sjömarken Beach

Early morning at Lake Viared

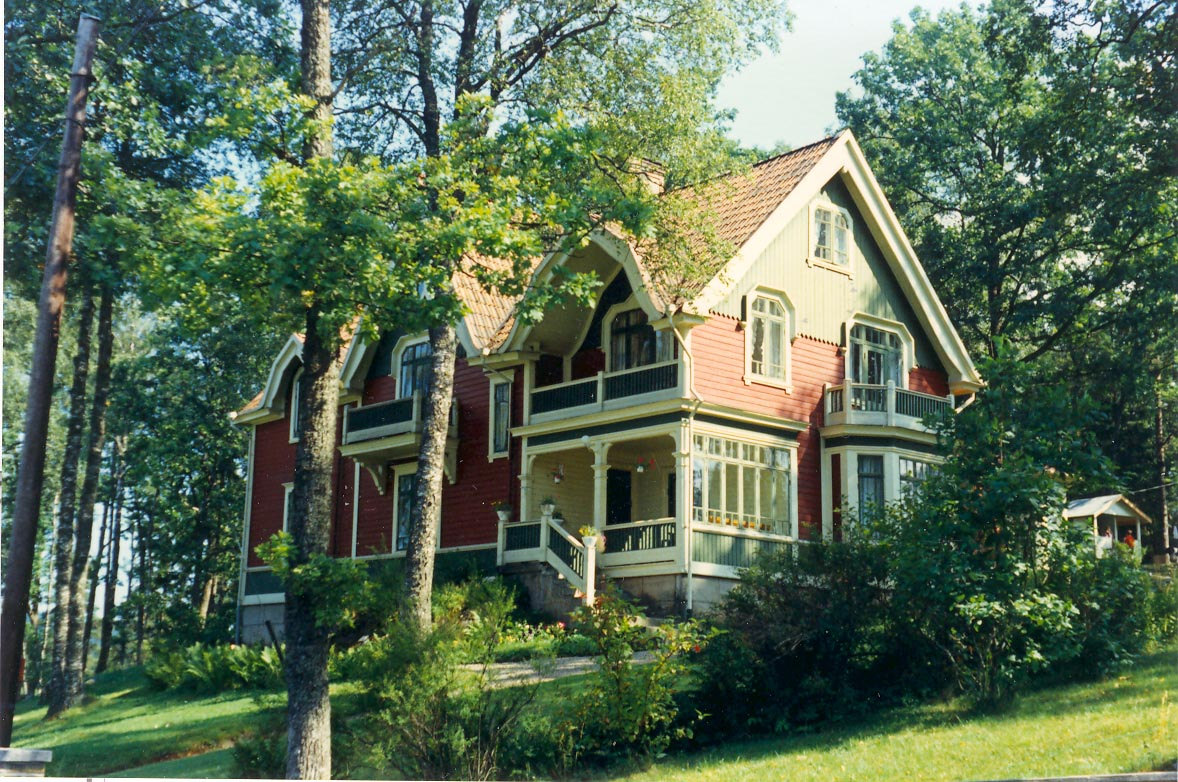
The old Pensionat Lyckebo in Sjömarken

Water Skiing on Lake Viared

== Location ==
Sjömarken is close to being merged with its neighboring town Sandared, as the Sjöhagen area in Sjömarken is extended toward the building of Björvik in Sandared. Before the Swedish municipality reform between 1962 and 1974 Sjömarken, Sandared, Hedared and Sandhult belonged to Sandhult municipality. All of these towns are now part of the Borås Municipality where they form the municipality district Sandhult. The municipality district office is located centrally in Sjömarken.

== Sports ==
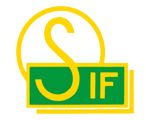
The logo of Sjömarkens Idrottsförening

Sjömarken has a sports club, Sjömarkens Idrottsförening, whose main areas are football, table tennis and cross country skiing.

== Education ==
The new Sjömarkenskolan was inaugurated in the fall of 1999. Sjömarkenskolan has a pre-school, and an elementary school serving grades 1–6. The school has about 380 students, and also offers leisure activities. Students in grades 7–9 attend the Sandgärdskolan in neighboring Sandared. There are many opportunities for secondary and university education in nearby Borås.

== Places of worship ==
Sjömarkens' missionary church is located in the center of the town, and also has a squash hall that can be rented. The Swedish churches are located in the nearby towns of Sandared and Sandhult.
