= Brämhults =

Brämhults may refer to:

- Something associated with Brämhult, Sweden
- Brämhults IK, Swedish football club
- Brämhults Juice, Swedish juicer manufacturer, now arth of the Eckes-Granini Group corporation
