= Sandareds IF =

Swedish football club

- Full name: Sandareds Idrottsförening
- Founded: 1925
- Ground: Sandevi; Sandared; Sweden
- Chairman: Torbjörn Dahl
- League: Division 3 Mellersta Götaland
- 2010: Division 4 Västergötland Södra, 1st (Promoted)
Home colours	Away colours

Sandareds IF is a Swedish football club located in Sandared in Borås Municipality, Västra Götaland County.

== Background ==
Sandareds Idrottsförening is a sports club in Sandared that was formed in 1925. The club caters for football and boules.

Since their foundation Sandareds IF has participated mainly in the middle and lower divisions of the Swedish football league system. The club currently plays in Division 3 Mellersta Götaland which is the fifth tier of Swedish football. The most successful period in the club's history was from 2002 until 2007 when Sandareds IF played in Division 2. They play their home matches at the Sandevi in Sandared.

Sandareds IF are affiliated to Västergötlands Fotbollförbund.

== Recent history ==
In recent seasons Sandareds IF have competed in the following divisions:

2011 – Division III, Mellersta Götaland
2010 – Division IV, Västergötland Södra
2009 – Division IV, Västergötland Södra
2008 – Division III, Mellersta Götaland
2007 – Division II, Västra Götaland
2006 – Division II, Västra Götaland
2005 – Division II, Mellersta Götaland
2004 – Division II, Östra Götaland
2003 – Division II, Östra Götaland
2002 – Division II, Västra Götaland
2001 – Division III, Mellersta Götaland
2000 – Division IV, Västergötland Södra
1999 – Division V, Sydvästra Älvsborg
1998 – Division V, Sydvästra Älvsborg
1997 – Division IV, Västergötland Södra
1996 – Division IV, Västergötland Södra
1995 – Division IV, Västergötland Södra
1994 – Division IV, Västergötland Västra
1993 – Division IV, Västergötland Södra

== Attendances ==
In recent seasons Sandareds IF have had the following average attendances:

Season	Average attendance	Division / Section	Level
2001	187	Div 3 Mellersta Götaland	Tier 4
2002	455	Div 2 Västra Götaland	Tier 3
2003	268	Div 2 Östra Götaland	Tier 3
2004	211	Div 2 Östra Götaland	Tier 3
2005	236	Div 2 Mellersta Götaland	Tier 3
2006	144	Div 2 Västra Götaland	Tier 4
2007	130	Div 2 Västra Götaland	Tier 4
2008	71	Div 3 Mellersta Götaland	Tier 5
2009	87	Div 4 Västergötland Södra	Tier 6
2010	76	Div 4 Västergötland Södra	Tier 6

* Attendances are provided in the Publikliga sections of the Svenska Fotbollförbundet website and European Football Statistics website.
