= Caroli Church =

Caroli Church may refer to:

- Caroli Church, Borås in Borås, Sweden, oldest building in Borås
- Caroli Church, Malmö in Malmö, Sweden
