= Martin Strömberg =

Swedish footballer (born 1978)

Personal information
- Date of birth: 18 May 1978 (age 48)
- Height: 1.81 m (5 ft 11 in)
- Position: Midfielder

Youth career
- –1997: Brämhults IK

Senior career*
Years	Team	Apps	(Gls)
1998–2006	IF Elfsborg	104	(1)
2006	→ Örgryte IS (loan)	15	(0)
2007	Örgryte IS	26	(0)
2008	Skene IF	18	(0)
2009–2016	Brämhults IK		
2012	→ Norrby IF (loan)	6	(0)
- * Club domestic league appearances and goals

Martin Strömberg (born 17 May 1978) is a Swedish former footballer who played as a midfielder. He notably played in Allsvenskan for IF Elfsborg and briefly for Örgryte IS.

== Career ==
Strömberg started his career in Brämhults IK, joining IF Elfsborg in 1998. He lost most of 2003 due to knee injury, but was able to stay on the team.

He scored a goal in 1999, but none since. He played his 100th Allsvenskan game in 2006. In July 2006 he went on loan to Örgryte IS, who struggled to avoid relegation from the 2006 Allsvenskan. Örgryte were relegated from the 2006 Allsvenskan, whereas Elfsborg won the league title. Strömberg had played enough games to receive a gold medal.

First, it looked like Strömberg would see through his contract with Elfsborg, which lasted until the end of 2007. Then, transfer interest from Jönköpings Södra IF was revealed. However, he did leave Elfsborg to play for Örbryte in Superettan.

Ahead of the 2008 season, Strömberg decided to wind down his professional career, and transferred to Skene IF in Division 3, the fifth tier of Swedish football. After one season there he moved on to Brämhults IK. As Strömberg reached 34 years of age and played in Division 4, he was loaned by Norrby IF (Elfsborg's city rival) in the second half of 2012, in order to help the team survive in the Division 1.

Strömberg coached Norrby's boys 15 team from 2022.

== Personal life ==
After football, Strömberg worked as a real estate agent.
