= Fristad =

- Location within Västra Götaland Location within Sweden
- Coordinates: 57°49′N 13°01′E
- Country: Sweden
- Province: Västergötland
- County: Västra Götaland County
- Municipality: Borås Municipality

Area
  - Total: 5.11 km^{2} (1.97 sq mi)

Population (31 December 2010)
  - Total: 4,924
  - Density: 964/km^{2} (2,500/sq mi)
- Time zone: UTC+1 (CET)
  - Summer (DST): UTC+2 (CEST)

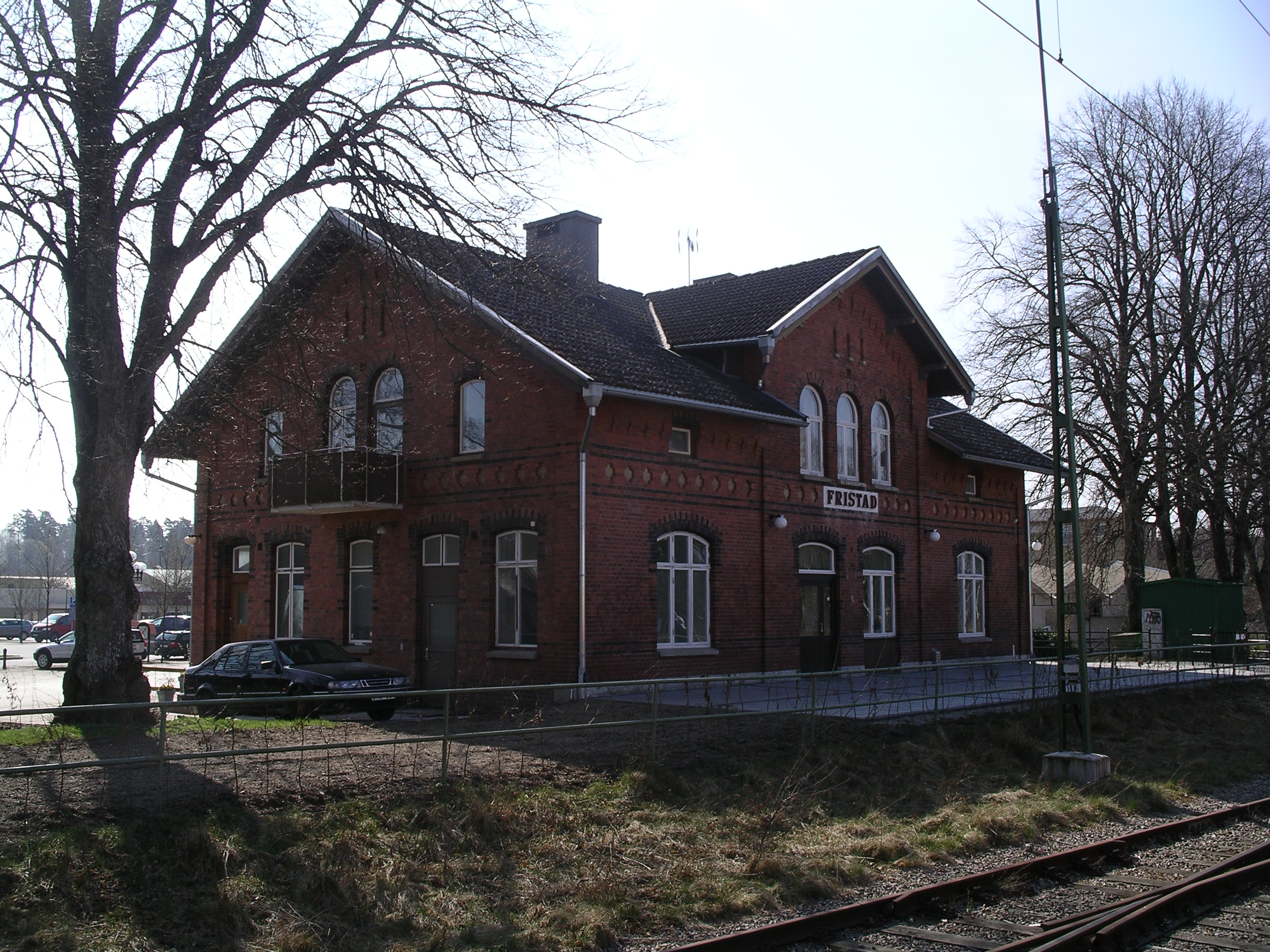
Fristad railroad station

Fristad is a locality situated in Borås Municipality, Västra Götaland County, Sweden. It had 4,924 inhabitants in 2010.
