= Bosnäs =

- Location within Västra Götaland Location within Sweden
- Coordinates: 57°40′N 12°51′E
- Country: Sweden
- Province: Västergötland
- County: Västra Götaland County
- Municipality: Borås Municipality

Area
  - Total: 0.47 km^{2} (0.18 sq mi)

Population (31 December 2010)
  - Total: 308
  - Density: 656/km^{2} (1,700/sq mi)
- Time zone: UTC+1 (CET)
  - Summer (DST): UTC+2 (CEST)

Bosnäs is a locality situated in Borås Municipality, Västra Götaland County, Sweden. It had 308 inhabitants in 2010.
