= Dalsjöfors =

- Location within Västra Götaland Location within Sweden
- Coordinates: 57°43′N 13°05′E
- Country: Sweden
- Province: Västergötland
- County: Västra Götaland County
- Municipality: Borås Municipality

Area
  - Total: 2.88 km^{2} (1.11 sq mi)

Population (31 December 2010)
  - Total: 3,362
  - Density: 1,168/km^{2} (3,030/sq mi)
- Time zone: UTC+1 (CET)
  - Summer (DST): UTC+2 (CEST)

Dalsjöfors is a locality situated in Borås Municipality, Västra Götaland County, Sweden. It had 3,362 inhabitants in 2010.

== Notable residents ==
- Kjell Johansson (born 1951), tennis player
