= Viskafors =

- Location within Västra Götaland Location within Sweden
- Coordinates: 57°38′N 12°50′E
- Country: Sweden
- Province: Västergötland
- County: Västra Götaland County
- Municipality: Borås Municipality

Area
  - Total: 3.86 km^{2} (1.49 sq mi)

Population (31 December 2010)
  - Total: 3,790
  - Density: 983/km^{2} (2,550/sq mi)
- Time zone: UTC+1 (CET)
  - Summer (DST): UTC+2 (CEST)

Viskafors is a locality situated in Borås Municipality, Västra Götaland County, Sweden. It had 3,790 inhabitants in 2010.
