= Borgstena =

- Location within Västra Götaland Location within Sweden
- Coordinates: 57°53′N 13°01′E
- Country: Sweden
- Province: Västergötland
- County: Västra Götaland County
- Municipality: Borås Municipality

Area
  - Total: 0.69 km^{2} (0.27 sq mi)

Population (31 December 2010)
  - Total: 386
  - Density: 561/km^{2} (1,450/sq mi)
- Time zone: UTC+1 (CET)
  - Summer (DST): UTC+2 (CEST)

Borgstena is a locality situated in Borås Municipality, Västra Götaland County, Sweden. It had 386 inhabitants in 2010.
