= Målsryd =

- Location within Västra Götaland Location within Sweden
- Coordinates: 57°41′N 13°03′E
- Country: Sweden
- Province: Västergötland
- County: Västra Götaland County
- Municipality: Borås Municipality

Area
  - Total: 0.99 km^{2} (0.38 sq mi)

Population (31 December 2010)
  - Total: 907
  - Density: 920/km^{2} (2,400/sq mi)
- Time zone: UTC+1 (CET)
  - Summer (DST): UTC+2 (CEST)

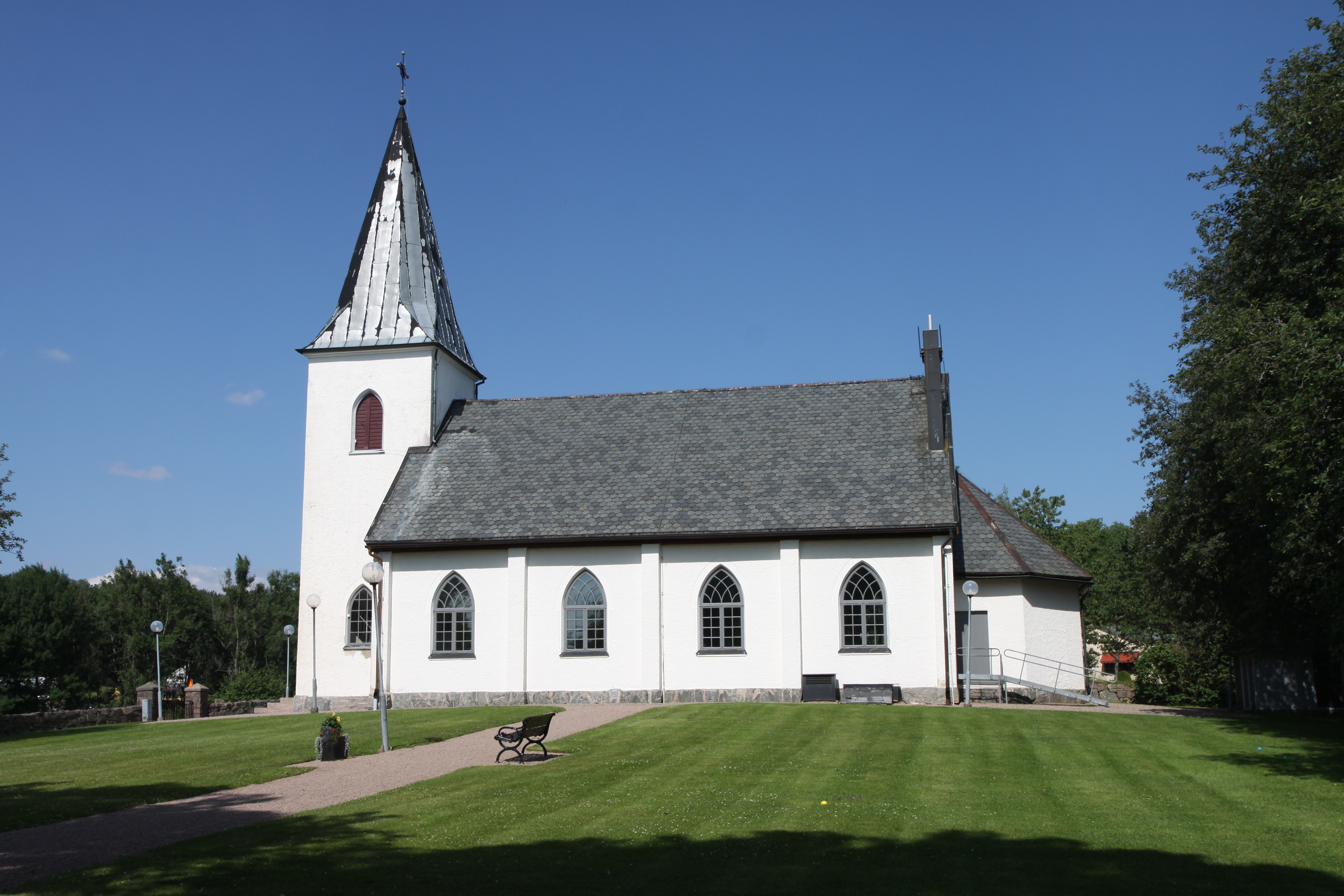
Målsryd's church

Målsryd is a locality situated in Borås Municipality, Västra Götaland County, Sweden. It had 907 inhabitants in 2010.
