= Brämhult =

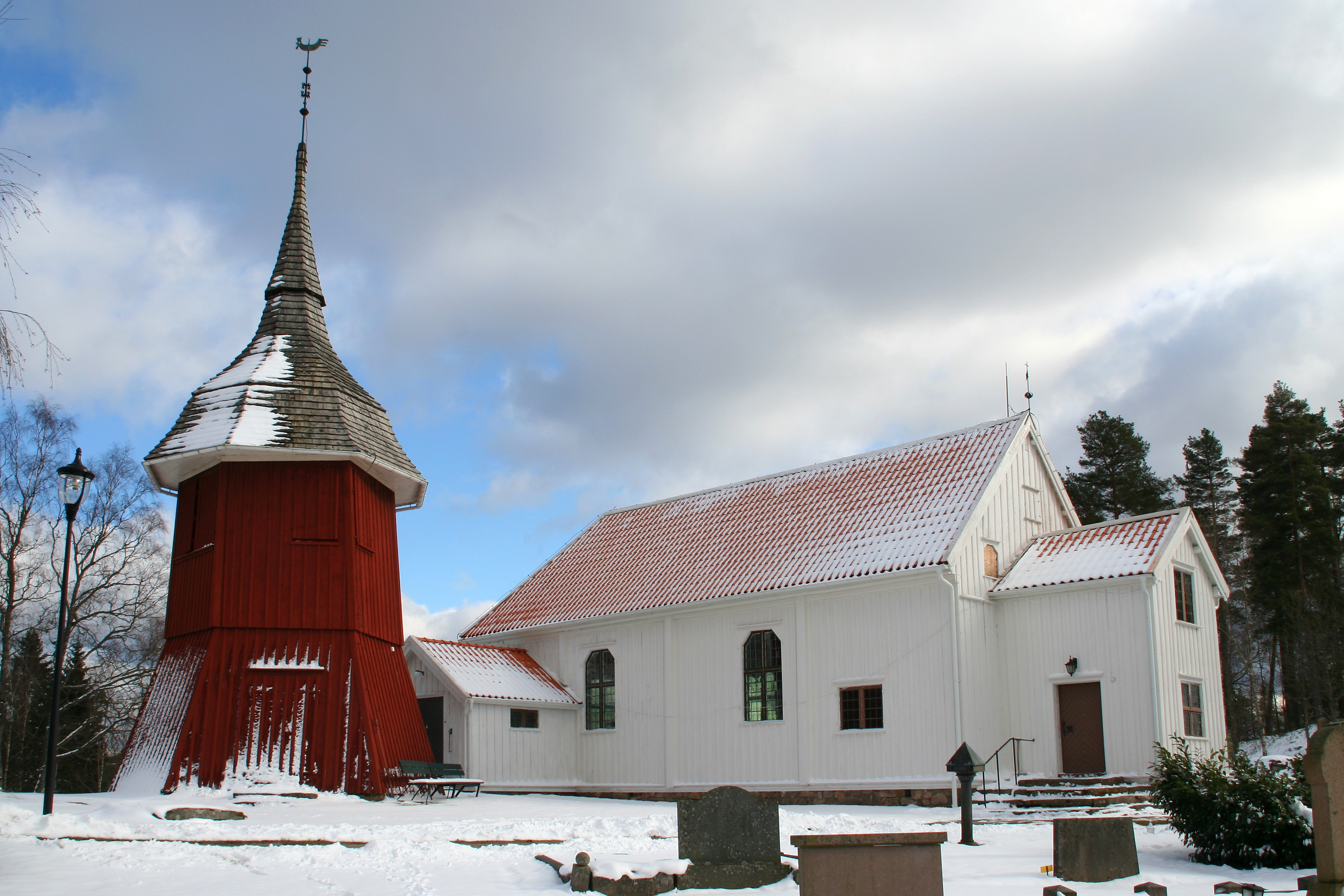
- Brämhult church

- Location within Västra Götaland Location within Sweden
- Coordinates: 57°44′8″N 13°0′39″E
- Country: Sweden
- Province: Västergötland
- County: Västra Götaland County
- Municipality: Borås Municipality
- Time zone: UTC+1 (CET)
  - Summer (DST): UTC+2 (CEST)

Brämhult is a locality in Borås Municipality, Västra Götaland, Sweden.

Brämhult was originally an agrarian village formed around a medieval wooden church, the oldest parts of which have been dated to the mid-15th century.

Today, Brämhult is a suburb of Borås.

== Sports ==
The following sports clubs are located in Brämhult:

- Brämhults IK
