= Aplared =

- Location within Västra Götaland Location within Sweden
- Coordinates: 57°39′N 13°04′E
- Country: Sweden
- Province: Västergötland
- County: Västra Götaland County
- Municipality: Borås Municipality

Area
  - Total: 0.55 km^{2} (0.21 sq mi)

Population (31 December 2010)
  - Total: 465
  - Density: 839/km^{2} (2,170/sq mi)
- Time zone: UTC+1 (CET)
  - Summer (DST): UTC+2 (CEST)

Aplared is a locality situated in Borås Municipality, Västra Götaland County, Sweden. It had 465 inhabitants in 2010.
