= Kinnarumma =

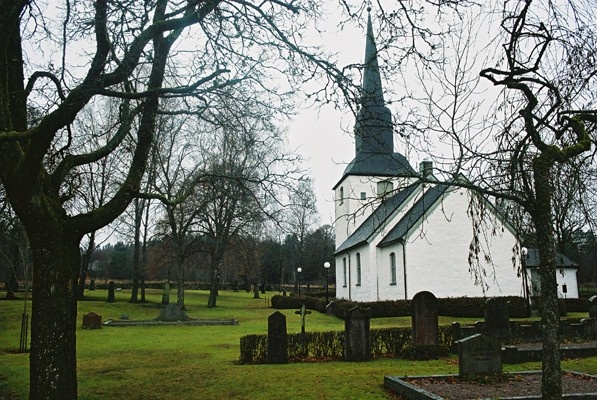
- Kinnarumma Church

- Location within Västra Götaland Location within Sweden
- Coordinates: 57°36′N 12°50′E
- Country: Sweden
- Province: Västergötland
- County: Västra Götaland County
- Municipality: Borås Municipality

Area
  - Total: 0.41 km^{2} (0.16 sq mi)

Population (31 December 2010)
  - Total: 253
  - Density: 625/km^{2} (1,620/sq mi)
- Time zone: UTC+1 (CET)
  - Summer (DST): UTC+2 (CEST)

Kinnarumma is a locality situated in Borås Municipality, Västra Götaland County, Sweden. It had 253 inhabitants in 2010.
