= Frufällan =

- Location within Västra Götaland Location within Sweden
- Coordinates: 57°47′N 12°58′E
- Country: Sweden
- Province: Västergötland
- County: Västra Götaland County
- Municipality: Borås Municipality

Area
  - Total: 1.03 km^{2} (0.40 sq mi)

Population (31 December 2010)
  - Total: 917
  - Density: 893/km^{2} (2,310/sq mi)
- Time zone: UTC+1 (CET)
  - Summer (DST): UTC+2 (CEST)

Frufällan is a locality situated in Borås Municipality, Västra Götaland County, Sweden. It had 917 inhabitants in 2010.
