= Ljud & Bildskolan =

Ljud & Bildskolan ("Audio and Visual School"), also called LBS, is a group of Swedish high schools that was founded in 1993 in Varberg.

LBS is a Swedish privately run school mainly dedicated to media, game development and music production. LBS has schools in Borås, Halmstad, Helsingborg, Kristianstad, Kungsbacka, Lund, Jönköping, Trollhättan, Varberg, Stockholm, Gothenburg, Linköping, Motala and Nyköping. Schools often have 80 people on staff and 300 students.

LBS is part of Academedia, a company which operates private schools under various brands throughout Sweden.

== Philosophy ==
LBS no longer gives the students a forecast of what their final grade will be. Their reasoning is that the students will take that grade and then not try to improve based on the feedback given from the teacher.

== LBS Game Awards ==
Every year LBS hosts an award event where all school's game development students compete. There are two large categories, one is XNA games which has three sub categories; best game made with XNA, best graphics in an XNA game and best game concept in XNA game. This category is aimed at the freshmen since they are taught XNA the first year while non-freshmen are forced to compete in the general one. The second large category is more general and consists of best game, best graphics and best game concept.

The 2014 event went largely undocumented.

There were a few changes for the 2015 event. It is not best graphics in a XNA game or game with best graphics now it is best 2D graphics and best 3D graphics. A game that the people get to pick and best "Pitch" where a group of students hold a presentation to sell their game idea.

== Links ==
- Ljud & Bildskolan
