= Hulta, Västra Götaland =

Borough of Borås, Västra Götaland, Sweden

Coordinates: 57°35′N 12°25′E

Hulta is a borough of Borås, Västra Götaland, Sweden.
