= Bredared =

- Location within Västra Götaland Location within Sweden
- Coordinates: 57°48′20″N 12°54′10″E
- Country: Sweden
- Province: Västergötland
- County: Västra Götaland County
- Municipality: Borås Municipality

Area
  - Total: 0.31 km^{2} (0.12 sq mi)

Population (31 December 2010)
  - Total: 227
  - Density: 742/km^{2} (1,920/sq mi)
- Time zone: UTC+1 (CET)
  - Summer (DST): UTC+2 (CEST)

Bredared is a locality situated in Borås Municipality, Västra Götaland County, Sweden. It had 228 inhabitants in 2010.
