= Mia Mulder =

Swedish politician and YouTuber

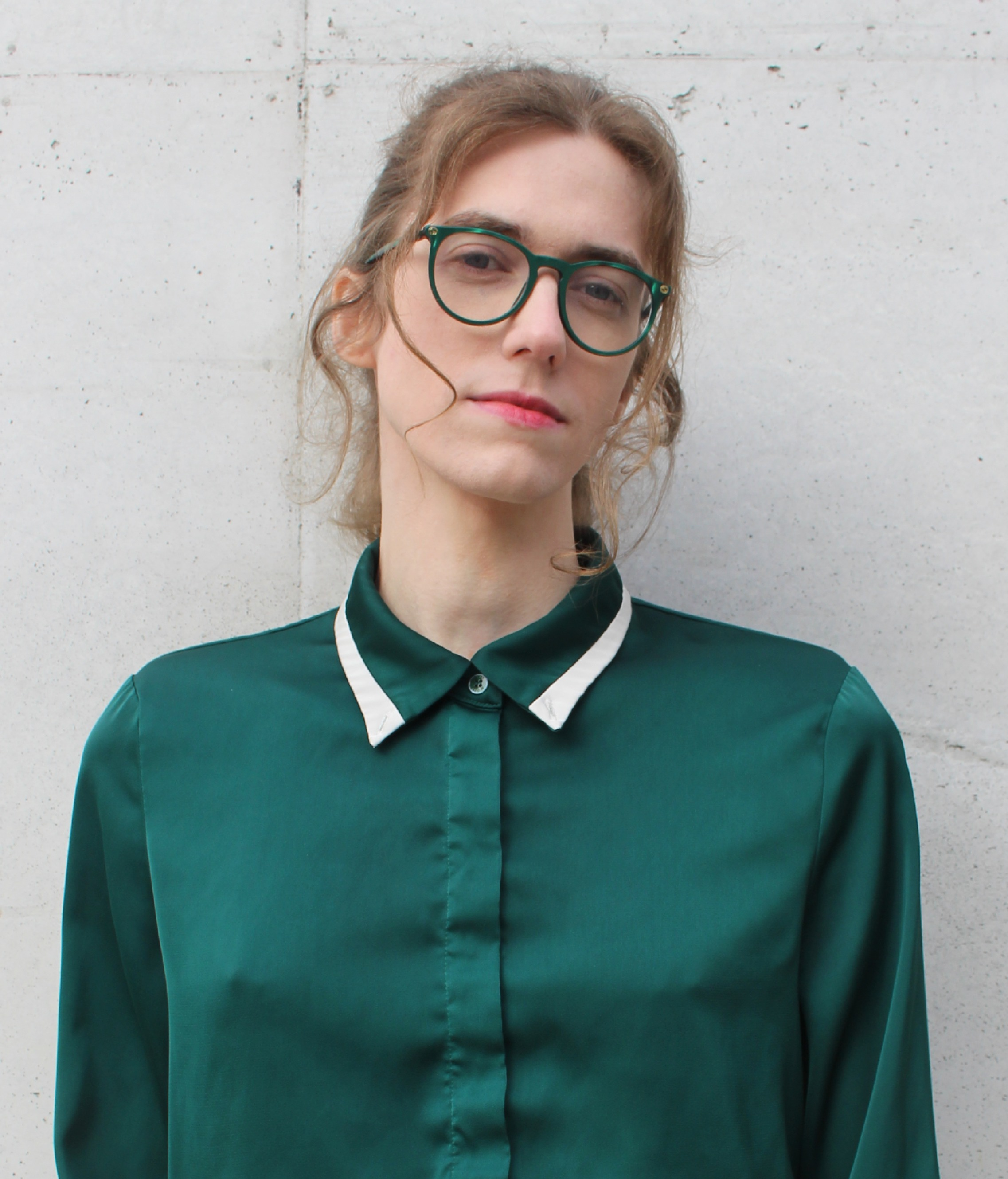

Sollentuna City Councillor
- In office September 2022 – February 2025

Personal details
- Born: 24 April 1993 (age 33) Sandhult, Sweden
- Party: Left Party
- Education: Uppsala University
- Occupation: YouTuber; activist; politician

YouTube information
- Channel: Mia Mulder
- Years active: 2018–present
- Subscribers: 161 thousand
- Views: 6.9 million
- Last updated: 05 January 2026

Mia Mulder (Swedish: [ˈmîːa ˈmɵ̌ldɛr]; born 24 April 1993) is a Swedish YouTuber, activist and a former politician. Mulder's YouTube channel focuses on general historical, social and political topics and on trans rights. By April 2022, Mulder's YouTube channel had passed 100,000 subscribers, earning the silver play button. From September 2022 to February 2025, she served on the city council in Sollentuna, representing the Left Party.

== Early life ==
Mulder was raised in Sandhult, Sweden. She studied history at Uppsala University, specialising in queer history, late 19th century German political history, and medical history dating back to 1750 and wrote a thesis on the history of compulsory sterilisation of transgender people in Sweden between 1972 and 2012. She has also studied acting.

Mulder worked as a fashion model and LGBTQ educator before focusing on activism.

== Activism ==
In the summer of 2016 Mulder founded and chaired Transförsvaret (Trans Defence), an activist group for the promotion of trans rights in Sweden with a focus on healthcare. The group published thirteen demands for better medical and legal treatment of transgender and intersex people in Sweden, as well as for other LGBT people and for refugees.

In November 2016, a group of more than 60 Transförsvaret activists staged an occupation of the offices of Sweden's National Board of Health and Welfare demanding the end to their classification of transgender people as mentally ill. The activists attempted to hold discussions with the Board's staff and remained in the offices for seven hours until end of the working day when they were escorted out by the police. Writing in Stockholms Fria Tidning Mulder said that the protest had attracted support from several other organisations but expressed frustration with the lack of change and reaffirmed her belief in the necessity of civil disobedience. In January 2017 the group held a protest outside Sweden's Ministry of Health and Social Affairs but were prevented from entering by the police.

Mulder is a member of the Left Party. In September 2022, she was elected to the city council in Sollentuna. In February 2025, she announced she had ended her involvement in politics.

== YouTube ==
Mulder makes video essays on a range of social and political issues from a historical perspective; many, but not all, relate to transgender rights issues. When interviewed by Dagens Nyheter, she described a great need for accessible coverage of humanities topics.

Mulder has become the most popular Swedish left wing YouTuber and is often classified with the "BreadTube" or "LeftTube" label. She is ambivalent about this classification, expressing kinship with some of the other "BreadTube" channel creators while lampooning the idea of "BreadTube" itself. Mulder's videos are all in English and are more popular in the US, UK and Germany than in Sweden, where video essays are not widely popular.

Interviewed following Lindsay Ellis's retirement from YouTube content creation, Mulder spoke about her attempts to avoid internet "drama", saying that she had to filter out transphobic comments made on her videos.

== Other activities ==
Mulder co-hosts the medical history podcast Leechfest. She also livestreams video games on Twitch and on her second YouTube channel.

== Personal life ==
Mulder resides in Edsberg, Sollentuna. She is bisexual and a trans woman.
