= Rydboholm =

- Location within Västra Götaland Location within Sweden
- Coordinates: 57°39′N 12°53′E
- Country: Sweden
- Province: Västergötland
- County: Västra Götaland County
- Municipality: Borås Municipality

Area
  - Total: 1.26 km^{2} (0.49 sq mi)

Population (31 December 2010)
  - Total: 1,023
  - Density: 814/km^{2} (2,110/sq mi)
- Time zone: UTC+1 (CET)
  - Summer (DST): UTC+2 (CEST)

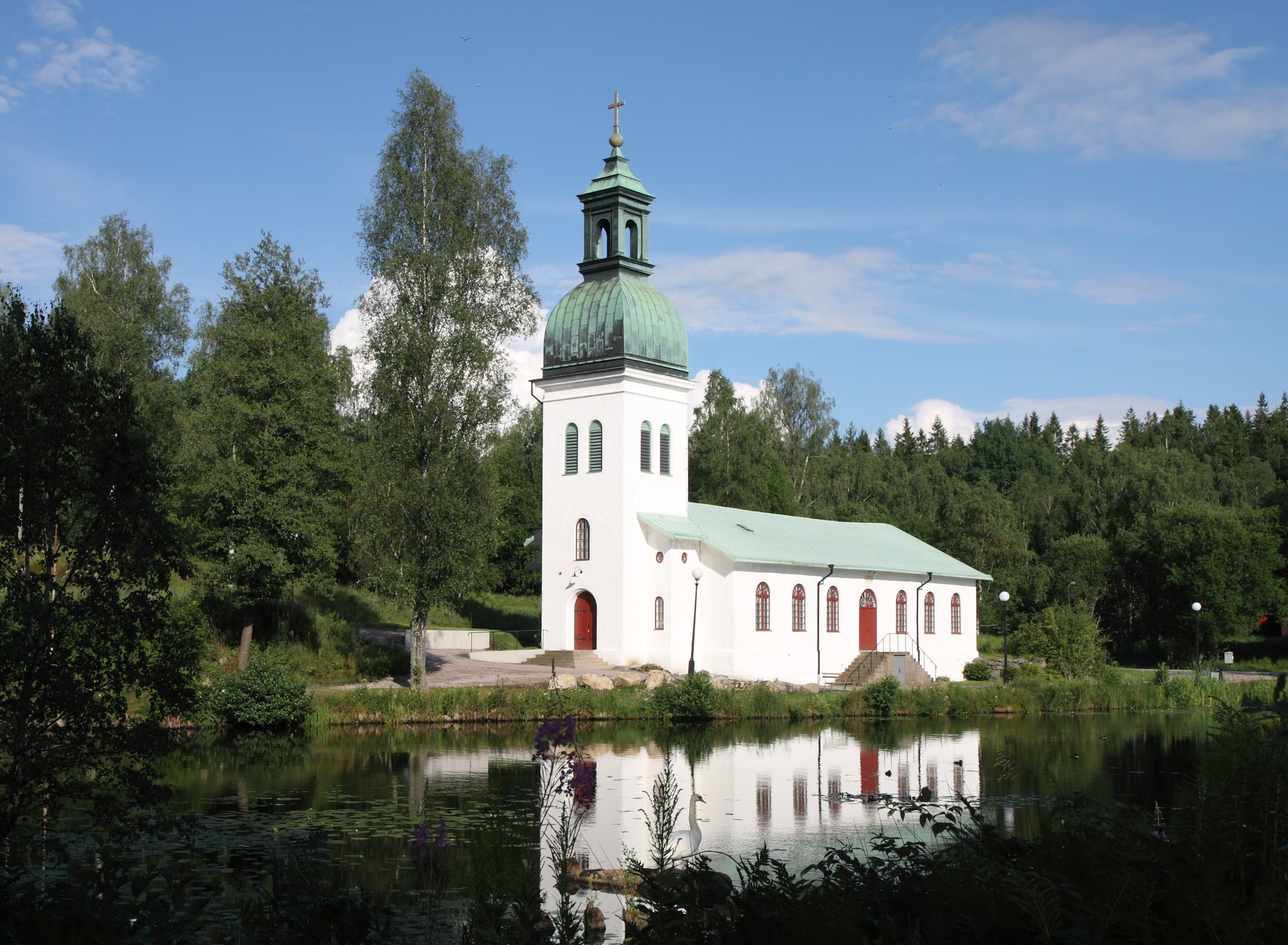

Rydboholm is a locality situated in Borås Municipality, Västra Götaland County, Sweden. It had 1,023 inhabitants in 2010.
