= Caroli Church, Borås =

Church building in Borås Municipality, Sweden

Coordinates: 57°43′20.3″N 12°56′22″E

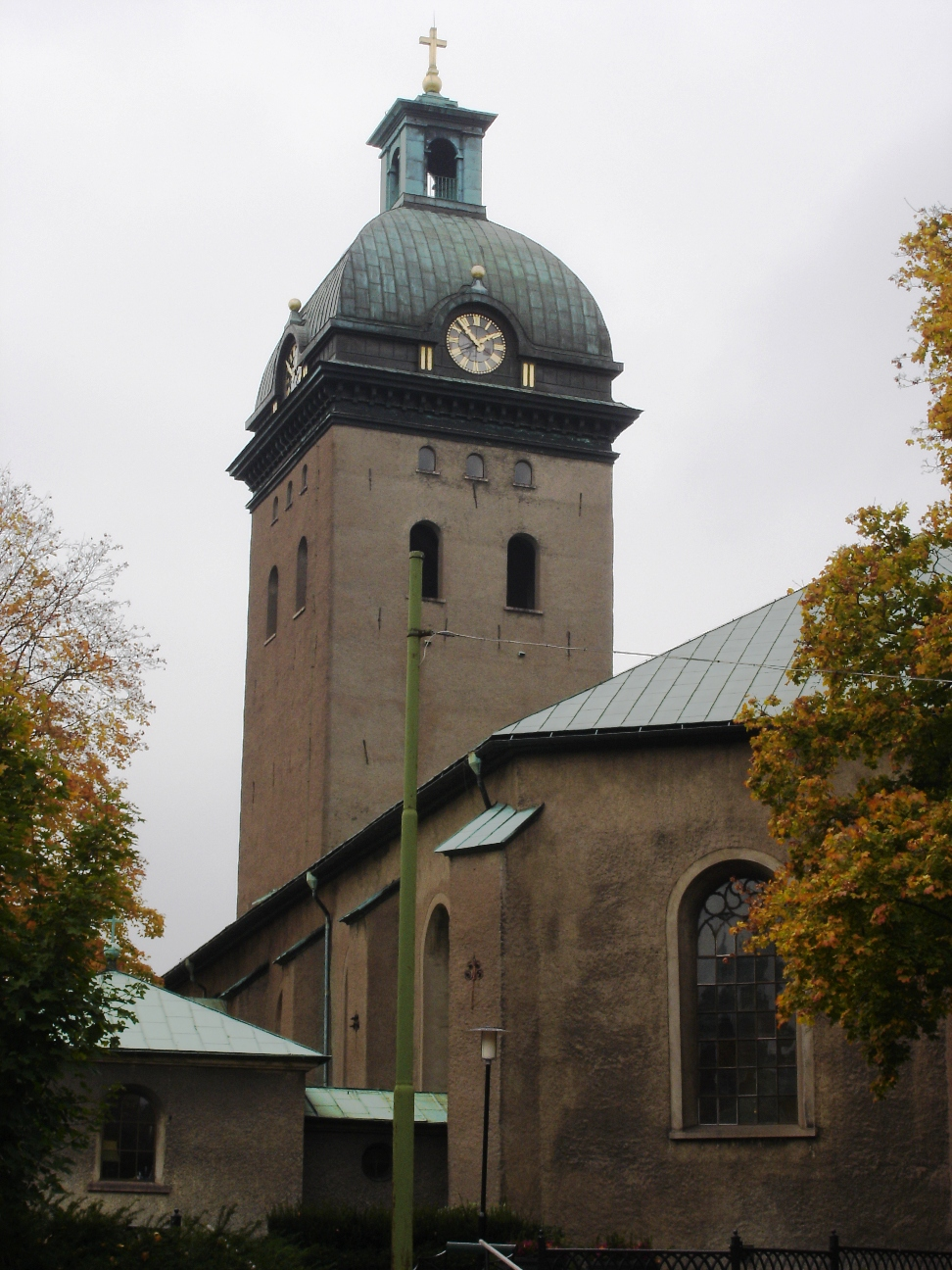
Caroli Church

Caroli Church (Caroli kyrka, Borås) is a parish church in Borås, Sweden. It is the city's oldest preserved building and dated from the 13th-century. The church is associated with the Diocese of Skara of the Church of Sweden.

== History ==
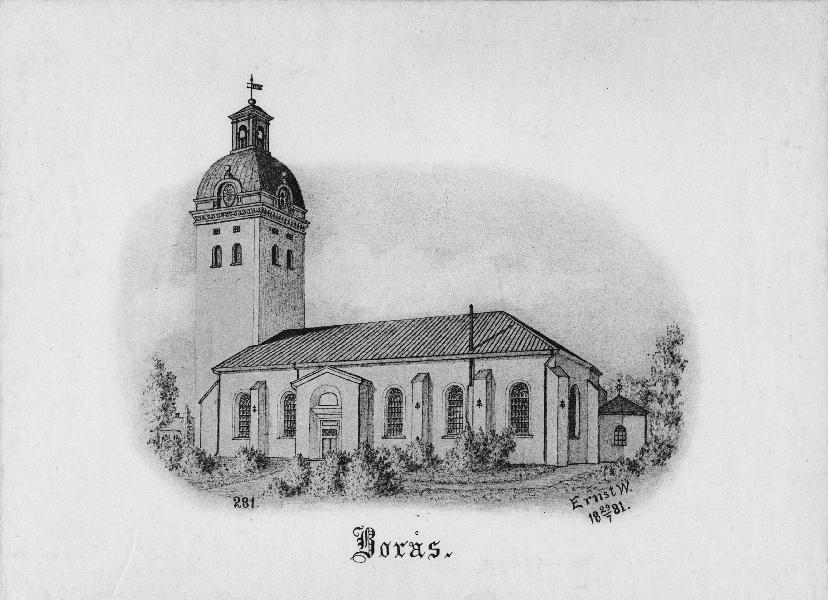
Print after drawing by Ernst Wennerblad (1881)

The church has been rebuilt and repaired after fires in 1681, 1727 and 1822. The tower was built in 1681. A renovation was carried out in 1914–1915 after drawings by architect Karl Anton Berlin (1871–1924). A major renovation occurred in 1938–1940 under the direction of architect Sigfrid Ericson (1879–1958). The painted decoration of the walls were made in Art Nouveau style after sketches by artist Carl Filip Månsson (1864–1933). The neoclassical altarpiece was performed during 1839–40 by Johannes Andersson of Mjöbäck (1780–1860). The current baptismal font and pulpit was designed in 1916 by Sigfrid Ericson and were both sculpted by Johan Björk of Gothenburg.

Birger Forell (1893–1958) was a priest in the Caroli Church in Borås from 1942 to 1951. In 1944, he founded the Committee for Christian post-war assistance at Borås.

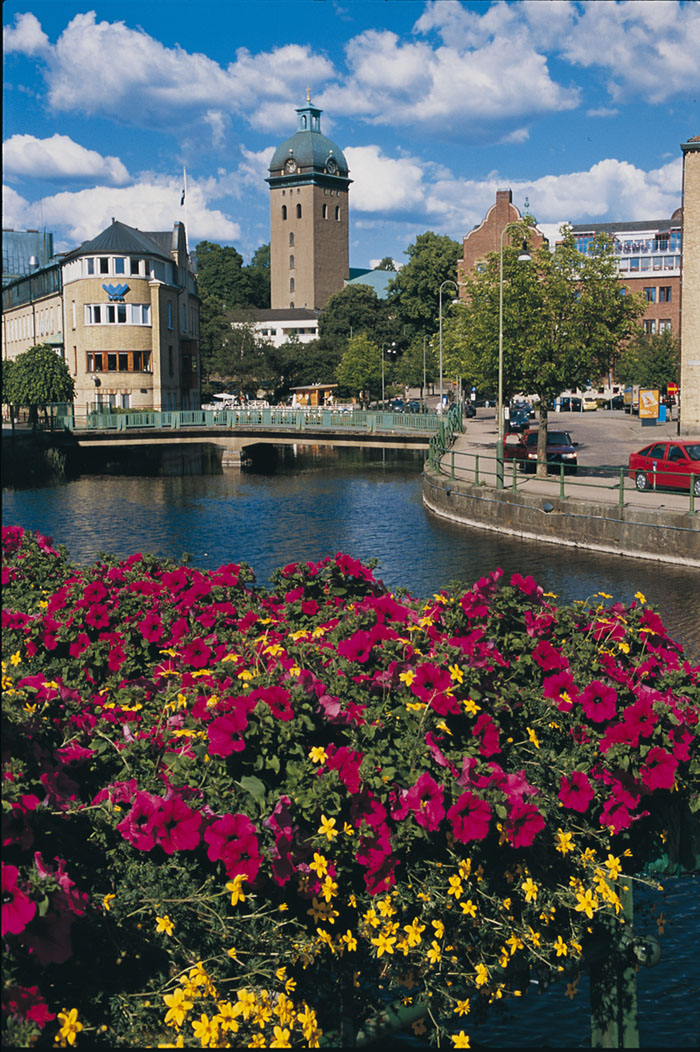
Krokshall square
