= Sandhult =

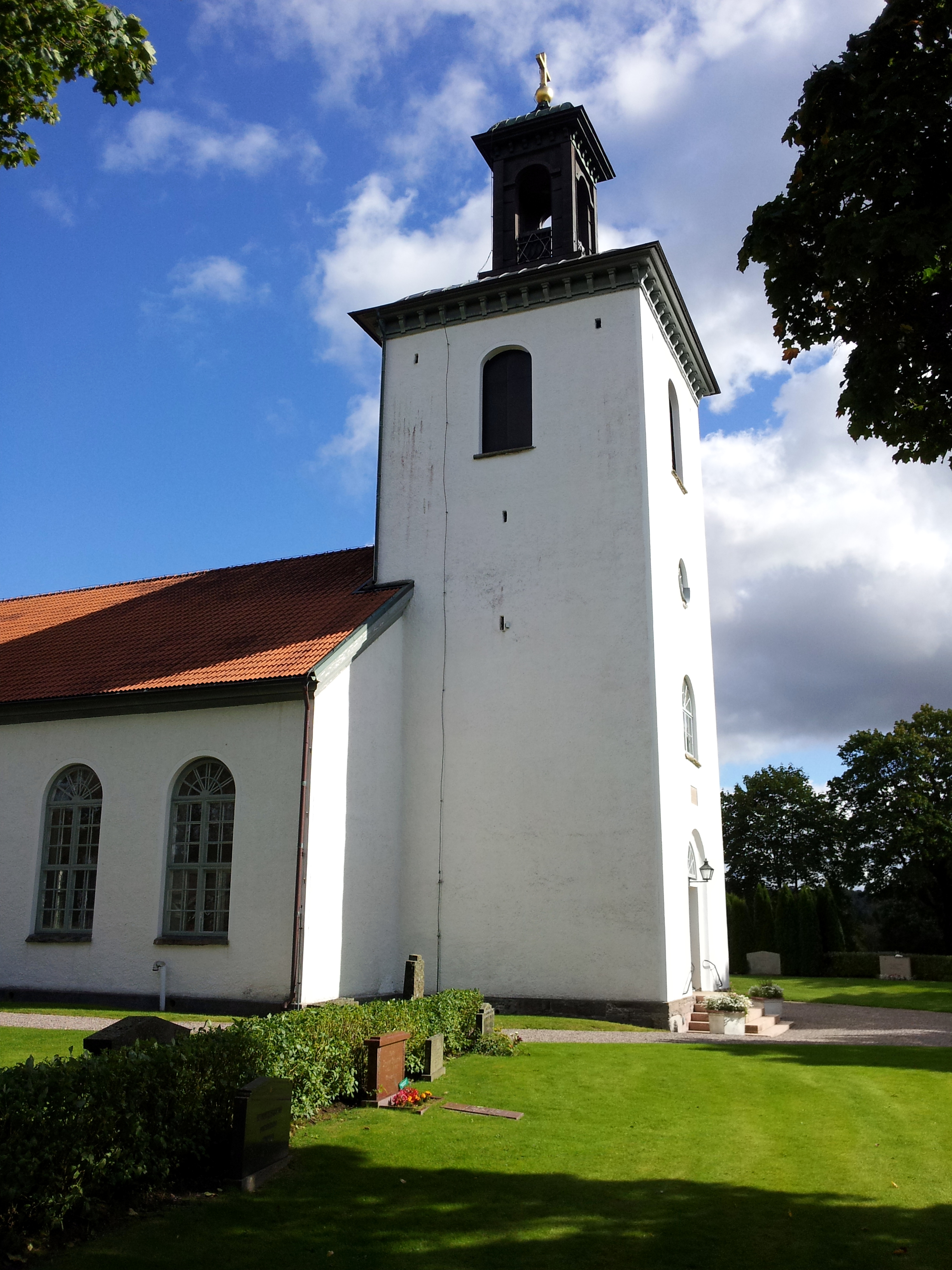

- Location within Västra Götaland Location within Sweden
- Coordinates: 57°46′N 12°49′E
- Country: Sweden
- Province: Västergötland
- County: Västra Götaland County
- Municipality: Borås Municipality

Area
  - Total: 0.55 km^{2} (0.21 sq mi)

Population (31 December 2010)
  - Total: 608
  - Density: 1,103/km^{2} (2,860/sq mi)
- Time zone: UTC+1 (CET)
  - Summer (DST): UTC+2 (CEST)

Sandhult is a locality situated in Borås Municipality, Västra Götaland County, Sweden. It had 608 inhabitants in 2010.

== Notable people ==
Notable people from Sandhult include:

- Carolina Klüft
- Mia Mulder
