= Sandared =

- Location within Västra Götaland Location within Sweden
- Coordinates: 57°43′N 12°48′E
- Country: Sweden
- Province: Västergötland
- County: Västra Götaland County
- Municipality: Borås Municipality

Area
  - Total: 2.55 km^{2} (0.98 sq mi)

Population (31 December 2010)
  - Total: 3,160
  - Density: 1,239/km^{2} (3,210/sq mi)
- Time zone: UTC+1 (CET)
  - Summer (DST): UTC+2 (CEST)

Sandared is a locality situated in Borås Municipality, Västra Götaland County, Sweden. It had 3,160 inhabitants in 2010.

== Sports ==
The following sports clubs are located in Sandared:

- Sandareds IF
- Sandareds IBS
