= Borås Municipality =

Municipality in Västra Götaland, Sweden

Borås Municipality Borås kommun
- Municipality
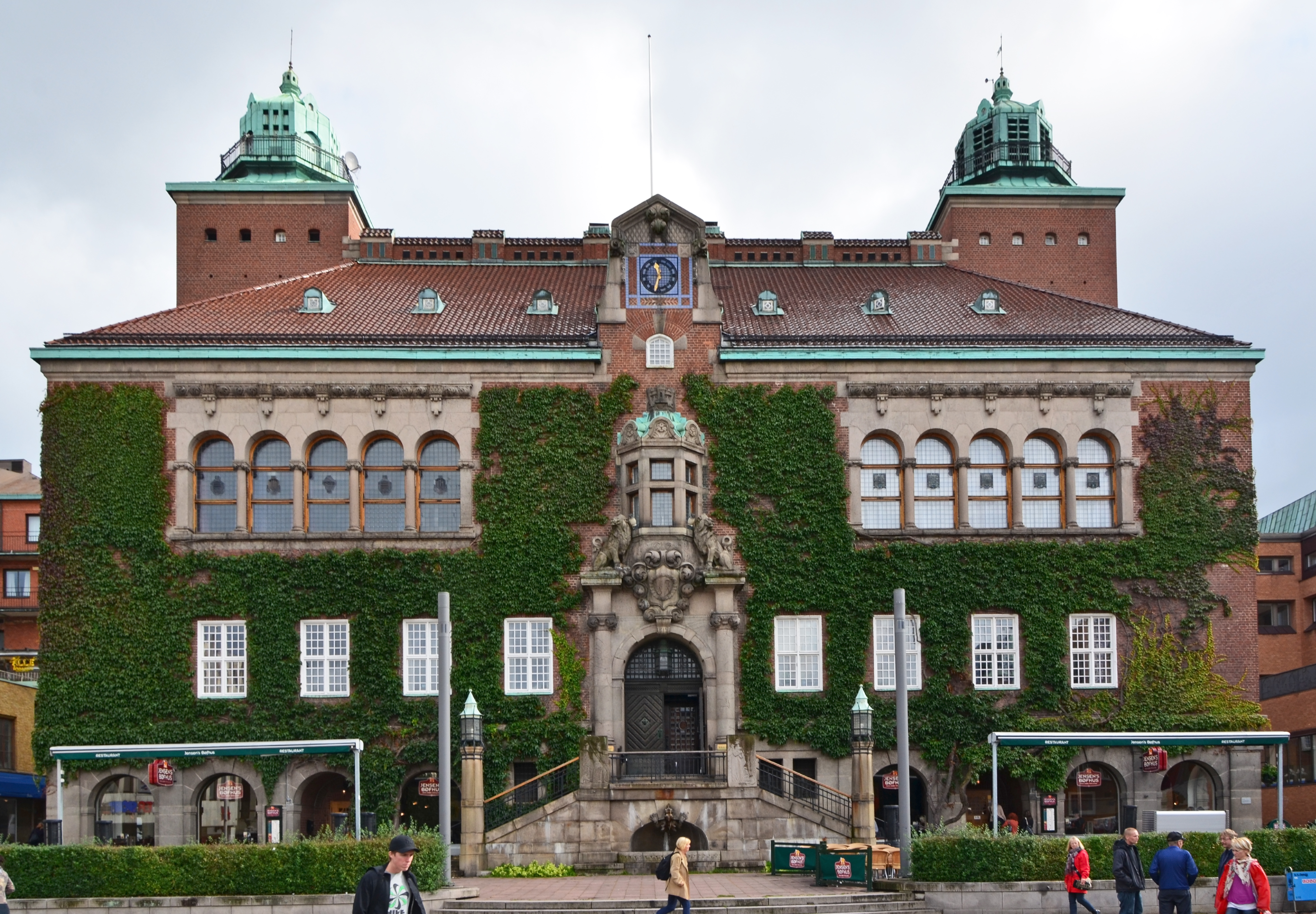
- Borås Town Hall

- Coat of arms

- Coordinates: 57°43′N 12°56′E
- Country: Sweden
- County: Västra Götaland County
- Seat: Borås

Area
  - Total: 967.54 km^{2} (373.57 sq mi)
  - Land: 909.9 km^{2} (351.3 sq mi)
  - Water: 57.64 km^{2} (22.25 sq mi)
- Area as of 1 January 2014.

Population (30 June 2025)
  - Total: 114,895
  - Density: 126.3/km^{2} (327.0/sq mi)
- Time zone: UTC+1 (CET)
  - Summer (DST): UTC+2 (CEST)
- ISO 3166 code: SE
- Province: Västergötland
- Municipal code: 1490
- Website: www.boras.se

Borås Municipality (Swedish: Borås kommun) is a municipality in Västra Götaland County in western Sweden. Its seat is located in the city of Borås.

In 1971, the City of Borås was made a municipality (kommun) when the unitary type of local government unit was introduced in Sweden. Three years later many surrounding municipalities were amalgamated with Borås. In 1995, the western part was separated, creating Bollebygd Municipality.

In the 1990s, the municipal assembly (kommunfullmäktige) decided to use the name "Borås stad" or "City of Borås" whenever possible, for the whole municipality, including rural areas. This decision is purely nominal and has no effect on the legal status of the municipality.

== Localities ==
- Aplared
- Äspered
- Borås (seat)
- Borgstena
- Bosnäs
- Bredared
- Dalsjöfors
- Dannike
- Fristad
- Frufällan
- Gånghester
- Hedared
- Kinnarumma
- Målsryd
- Rångedala
- Rydboholm
- Sandared
- Sandhult
- Seglora
- Sjömarken
- Tosseryd
- Viskafors

== Demographics ==
This is a demographic table based on Borås Municipality's electoral districts in the 2022 Swedish general election sourced from SVT's election platform, in turn taken from SCB official statistics.

In total there were 113,940 residents, including 83,786 Swedish citizens of voting age. 46.2% voted for the left coalition and 52.1% for the right coalition. Indicators are in percentage points except population totals and income.

Location	Residents	Citizen adults	Left vote	Right vote	Employed	Swedish parents	Foreign heritage	Income SEK	Degree
Location			%	%					
Alideberg-Erikslund	1,094	786	54.1	44.2	75	40	60	22,412	41
Aplared	1,127	909	40.6	58.7	85	87	13	26,582	33
Bergdalen S	1,478	1,188	39.6	59.7	87	87	13	29,681	51
Bergdalen-Liljeberget	899	667	50.1	49.4	80	72	28	25,419	43
Bergsbo-Trandared	782	623	38.5	59.4	81	78	22	25,157	42
Bergsäter-Bergsbo	851	921	39.6	58.2	80	80	20	25,170	44
Boda-Brämhult	1,412	1,068	47.8	51.0	77	50	50	24,760	42
Borgstena-Tämta	1,385	1,082	38.9	59.6	85	87	13	25,352	50
Bosnäs-Viared	1,030	793	38.2	61.0	85	83	17	28,392	38
Bredared	1,270	972	40.9	58.5	89	90	10	29,782	39
Brotorp	1,386	1,112	49.4	49.4	83	71	29	27,154	42
Brämhult-Kärra	1,877	1,333	43.6	55.5	87	74	26	30,595	53
Brämhult-Ön	1,535	1,144	42.3	57.0	87	76	24	29,955	50
Byttorp	1,462	1,268	49.3	49.1	81	79	21	24,668	46
Centrum	641	514	36.3	63.4	84	74	26	28,144	47
Centrum N	1,223	1,026	41.8	57.0	77	71	29	22,993	48
Centrum Ö	1,448	1,234	38.8	60.0	79	71	29	24,787	42
Dalsjöfors V	2,371	1,729	45.8	53.8	87	83	17	27,526	38
Dalsjöfors Ö	2,103	1,498	42.2	56.4	86	86	14	27,406	37
Dammsvedjan-Gässlösa	1,702	1,302	48.5	50.4	85	72	28	27,100	47
Dannike	1,049	773	38.1	60.6	83	87	13	27,002	29
Druvefors V	1,368	1,121	46.3	51.2	79	67	33	27,642	47
Druvefors Ö	1,068	793	50.3	48.2	83	63	37	26,329	43
Ekås-Hestra	1,387	1,019	45.6	53.1	87	85	15	31,485	47
Fristad-Asklanda	1,513	1,065	37.8	61.3	90	87	13	30,783	44
Fristad-Gingri	1,730	1,358	46.1	52.2	83	86	14	22,983	30
Fristad-Kvarbo	1,805	1,427	42.4	56.1	83	85	15	25,749	35
Frufällan-Tosseryd	1,355	994	34.9	64.6	86	77	23	31,251	42
Gånghester	1,788	1,294	43.8	55.1	89	82	18	29,392	44
Göta	1,271	967	54.2	42.1	71	50	50	21,417	33
Göta-Kristineberg	1,456	1,028	54.1	41.5	71	53	47	23,000	38
Göta-Regementet	893	886	45.4	53.0	77	75	25	25,558	36
Hedvigsborg-Kråkered	2,087	1,515	44.1	54.3	81	74	26	26,222	40
Hestra-Byttorp	1,455	1,137	45.4	53.3	81	77	23	25,865	49
Hestra Parkstad	1,453	1,065	52.0	47.4	86	79	21	30,559	59
Hulta V	1,702	1,253	54.7	42.0	75	49	51	22,658	36
Hulta Ö	2,017	1,129	69.7	24.5	65	14	86	17,946	26
Hässleholmen-Bråhult	1,493	1,096	49.1	49.5	83	63	37	27,817	52
Hässleholmen-Distansg.	2,060	788	74.2	22.1	56	13	87	15,022	33
Hässleholmen-Tunnlandsg.	2,074	956	72.2	20.4	59	16	84	15,138	26
Hässleholmen-Våglängdsg.	1,599	848	75.6	16.8	55	14	86	13,132	23
Knalleland-Lundby	705	508	50.9	48.8	64	55	45	16,649	45
Kristineberg	1,654	1,012	58.7	37.9	68	34	66	18,979	35
Lugnet	1,301	1,142	47.7	51.6	78	75	25	23,482	47
Lundaskog-Lyckebo	1,354	959	37.9	61.2	88	74	26	33,019	48
Målsryd	1,172	901	43.8	55.1	84	81	19	27,086	34
Norrby-Billdalsgatan	1,797	872	76.6	11.5	55	8	92	13,481	20
Norrby N	1,187	820	74.9	18.9	58	15	85	15,892	25
Norrby S	1,280	708	67.7	26.1	62	22	78	15,443	32
Norrmalm-Hornsgatan	1,259	1,040	42.5	56.1	83	79	21	27,398	44
Norrmalm-Kype	1,199	956	49.8	48.7	80	69	31	24,272	46
Norrmalm-Nedre	1,330	1,125	46.9	51.5	83	78	22	26,589	48
Norrmalm-Sagavallen	1,240	914	50.3	46.9	83	75	25	27,173	45
Parkstaden-Byttorp	1,240	954	38.5	60.3	81	80	20	27,976	44
Rydboholm	1,166	857	43.4	54.6	84	74	26	26,446	31
Salängen-Villastaden	1,429	1,174	39.8	58.9	81	78	22	28,112	47
Sandared	1,451	1,086	45.5	53.4	85	85	15	24,865	42
Sandared V	1,211	881	38.8	60.7	88	86	14	31,085	49
Sandared Ö	1,193	858	31.9	67.3	89	88	12	32,353	53
Sandhult-Hedared	1,593	1,186	37.2	61.9	87	84	16	27,438	35
Sjöbo-Almenäs	1,194	976	51.3	45.0	73	57	43	22,386	37
Sjöbo-Björksäter	1,131	921	51.9	45.9	72	52	48	20,897	33
Sjöbo-Johannelund	1,069	760	52.1	43.8	69	47	53	19,333	28
Sjöbo-Långesten	1,526	1,019	50.5	47.4	70	42	58	21,250	34
Sjöbo-Nolhaga	1,139	845	58.0	39.4	64	45	55	17,446	29
Sjöbo-Ryda	1,345	1,052	55.2	43.6	71	56	44	19,437	33
Sjömarken N	1,466	1,018	35.3	64.5	89	84	16	32,979	52
Sjömarken S	1,672	1,155	40.1	59.5	86	80	20	31,017	50
Sparsör	1,762	1,283	39.0	59.9	89	86	14	31,193	51
Svaneholm-Seglora	1,700	1,218	45.0	52.8	79	72	28	24,465	30
Svensgärde-Sörmarken	1,742	1,318	47.7	51.4	88	69	31	29,018	50
Trandared S	1,361	1,046	50.2	48.6	77	69	31	23,099	36
Trandared V	1,533	1,180	45.7	52.6	82	73	27	26,532	37
Trandared Ö	1,328	1,093	55.0	42.9	82	71	29	25,678	37
Tullen	1,502	1,204	48.4	50.5	77	71	29	22,762	34
Villastaden	1,115	1,004	38.8	60.3	83	79	21	28,255	42
Viskafors-Fagersberg	1,538	1,108	50.8	48.5	84	76	24	25,525	33
Viskafors-Kinnarumma	1,960	1,445	41.4	57.6	84	79	21	27,417	33
Äspered-Rångedala	1,824	1,354	38.9	60.1	88	91	9	28,476	39
Östermalm	1,573	1,153	41.2	56.9	78	67	33	25,472	45
Source: SVT

== Twin towns – sister cities ==
Borås is twinned with:

- Espelkamp, Germany
- Mikkeli, Finland
- Molde, Norway
- Vejle, Denmark
