= Brämhults IK =

Swedish football club

- Full name: Brämhults Idrottsklubb
- Founded: 1953
- Ground: Brämhults IP, Brämhult
- Chairman: Claes Palmén
- League: Division 4 Västergötland Södra
Home colours

Brämhults IK is a Swedish football club located in Brämhult.

== Background ==
Brämhults IK currently plays in Division 4 Västergötland Södra which is the sixth tier of Swedish football. They play their home matches at the Brämhults IP in Brämhult.

The club is affiliated to Västergötlands Fotbollförbund.

== Season to season ==
Season	Level	Division	Section	Position	Movements
1993	Tier 5	Division 4	Västergötland Södra	1st	Promoted
1994	Tier 4	Division 3	Sydvästra Götaland	10th	Relegated
1995	Tier 5	Division 4	Västergötland Södra	7th	
1996	Tier 5	Division 4	Västergötland Södra	9th	
1997	Tier 5	Division 4	Västergötland Södra	6th	
1998	Tier 5	Division 4	Västergötland Södra	6th	
1999	Tier 5	Division 4	Västergötland Södra	2nd	
2000	Tier 5	Division 4	Västergötland Södra	4th	
2001	Tier 5	Division 4	Västergötland Södra	7th	
2002	Tier 5	Division 4	Västergötland Södra	11th	Relegated
2003	Tier 6	Division 5	Västergötland Sydöstra	11th	Relegated
2004	Tier 7	Division 6	Kinna	1st	Promoted
2005	Tier 6	Division 5	Västergötland Sydöstra	5th	
2006*	Tier 7	Division 5	Västergötland Mellersta	7th	
2007	Tier 7	Division 5	Västergötland Sydöstra	12th	Relegated
2008	Tier 8	Division 6	Borås	1st	Promoted
2009	Tier 7	Division 5	Västergötland Mellersta	2nd	Promotion Playoffs – Promoted
2010	Tier 6	Division 4	Västergötland Södra	7th	
2011	Tier 6	Division 4	Västergötland Södra		

* League restructuring in 2006 resulted in a new division being created at Tier 3 and subsequent divisions dropping a level.
