= 1937–38 in Swedish football =

The 1937–38 season in Swedish football, starting August 1937 and ending July 1938:

== Honours ==
=== Official titles ===
| Title | Team | Reason |
|---|---|---|
| 1937–38 Swedish Champions | IK Sleipner | Winners of Allsvenskan |

=== Competitions ===
| Level | Competition | Team |
|---|---|---|
| 1st level | Allsvenskan 1937–38 | IK Sleipner |
| 2nd level | Division 2 Norra 1937–38 | Hammarby IF |
| 2nd level | Division 2 Östra 1937–38 | Hallstahammars SK |
| 2nd level | Division 2 Västra 1937–38 | Degerfors IF |
| 2nd level | Division 2 Södra 1937–38 | Malmö BI |
| Regional Championship | Norrländska Mästerskapet 1938 | Bodens BK |

== Promotions, relegations and qualifications ==
=== Promotions ===
| Promoted from | Promoted to | Team | Reason |
|---|---|---|---|
| Division 2 Östra 1937–38 | Allsvenskan 1938–39 | Hallstahammars SK | Winners of promotion play-off |
| Division 2 Västra 1937–38 | Allsvenskan 1938–39 | Degerfors IF | Winners of promotion play-off |
| Division 3 1937–38 | Division 2 Norra 1938–39 | Enköpings SK | Winners of Östsvenska |
| Division 3 1937–38 | Division 2 Norra 1938–39 | Ludvika FfI | Winners of promotion play-off |
| Division 3 1937–38 | Division 2 Östra 1938–39 | Husqvarna IF | Winners of Södra Mellansvenska |
| Division 3 1937–38 | Division 2 Östra 1938–39 | IF Rune | Winners of promotion play-off |
| Division 3 1937–38 | Division 2 Västra 1938–39 | Deje IK | Winners of Nordvästra |
| Division 3 1937–38 | Division 2 Södra 1938–39 | Kalmar AIK | Winners of Sydöstra |
| Division 3 1937–38 | Division 2 Södra 1938–39 | IFK Malmö | Winners of Sydsvenska |
| Division 3 1937–38 | Division 2 Södra 1938–39 | Oskarströms IS | Winners of promotion play-off |

=== League transfers ===
| Transferred from | Transferred to | Team | Reason |
|---|---|---|---|
| Division 2 Västra 1937–38 | Division 2 Östra 1938–39 | IK Tord | Geographical composition |
| Division 2 Södra 1937–38 | Division 2 Västra 1938–39 | Varbergs BoIS | Geographical composition |

=== Relegations ===
| Relegated from | Relegated to | Team | Reason |
|---|---|---|---|
| Allsvenskan 1937–38 | Division 2 Västra 1938–39 | IFK Göteborg | 11th team |
| Allsvenskan 1937–38 | Division 2 Västra 1938–39 | GAIS | 12th team |
| Division 2 Norra 1937–38 | Division 3 1938–39 | Sundbybergs IK | 9th team |
| Division 2 Norra 1937–38 | Division 3 1938–39 | Skutskärs IF | 10th team |
| Division 2 Östra 1937–38 | Division 3 1938–39 | BK Derby | 9th team |
| Division 2 Östra 1937–38 | Division 3 1938–39 | Katrineholms AIK | 10th team |
| Division 2 Västra 1937–38 | Division 3 1938–39 | Alingsås IF | 9th team |
| Division 2 Västra 1937–38 | Division 3 1938–39 | Karlstads BIK | 10th team |
| Division 2 Södra 1937–38 | Division 3 1938–39 | IFK Kristianstad | 9th team |
| Division 2 Södra 1937–38 | Division 3 1938–39 | IFK Helsingborg | 10th team |

== Domestic results ==
=== Allsvenskan 1937–38 ===

| | Team | Pld | W | D | L | GF | | GA | GD | Pts |
|---|---|---|---|---|---|---|---|---|---|---|
| 1 | IK Sleipner | 22 | 12 | 6 | 4 | 46 | – | 28 | +18 | 30 |
| 2 | Helsingborgs IF | 22 | 12 | 2 | 8 | 36 | – | 27 | +9 | 26 |
| 3 | Landskrona BoIS | 22 | 10 | 6 | 6 | 40 | – | 31 | +9 | 26 |
| 4 | IF Elfsborg | 22 | 12 | 2 | 8 | 44 | – | 37 | +7 | 26 |
| 5 | Gårda BK | 22 | 8 | 9 | 5 | 29 | – | 28 | +1 | 25 |
| 6 | AIK | 22 | 9 | 6 | 7 | 44 | – | 37 | +7 | 24 |
| 7 | IK Brage | 22 | 9 | 3 | 10 | 45 | – | 44 | +1 | 21 |
| 8 | Sandvikens IF | 22 | 8 | 5 | 9 | 29 | – | 32 | -3 | 21 |
| 9 | Malmö FF | 22 | 6 | 8 | 8 | 20 | – | 30 | -10 | 20 |
| 10 | Örgryte IS | 22 | 7 | 5 | 10 | 33 | – | 37 | -4 | 19 |
| 11 | IFK Göteborg | 22 | 6 | 4 | 12 | 28 | – | 35 | -7 | 16 |
| 12 | GAIS | 22 | 3 | 4 | 15 | 19 | – | 47 | -28 | 10 |

=== Allsvenskan promotion play-off 1937–38 ===
June 6, 1938

| Hallstahammars SK | 2–1 | Hammarby IF |

?, Hallstahammar
June 12, 1938

| Hammarby IF | 1–1 | Hallstahammars SK |

?, Stockholm

June 6, 1938

| Degerfors IF | 3–1 | Malmö BI |

?, Degerfors
June 12, 1938

| Malmö BI | 0–2 | Degerfors IF |

?, Malmö

=== Division 2 Norra 1937–38 ===

| | Team | Pld | W | D | L | GF | | GA | GD | Pts |
|---|---|---|---|---|---|---|---|---|---|---|
| 1 | Hammarby IF | 18 | 11 | 4 | 3 | 44 | – | 19 | +25 | 26 |
| 2 | Djurgårdens IF | 18 | 8 | 6 | 4 | 34 | – | 26 | +8 | 22 |
| 3 | Värtans IK | 18 | 8 | 5 | 5 | 27 | – | 21 | +6 | 21 |
| 4 | Gefle IF | 18 | 8 | 4 | 6 | 31 | – | 31 | 0 | 20 |
| 5 | Ljusne AIK | 18 | 8 | 4 | 6 | 30 | – | 35 | -5 | 20 |
| 6 | Reymersholms IK | 18 | 5 | 6 | 7 | 35 | – | 33 | +2 | 16 |
| 7 | IFK Grängesberg | 18 | 6 | 3 | 9 | 38 | – | 39 | -1 | 15 |
| 8 | Bollnäs GIF | 18 | 5 | 5 | 8 | 23 | – | 29 | -6 | 15 |
| 9 | Sundbybergs IK | 18 | 5 | 4 | 9 | 25 | – | 37 | -12 | 14 |
| 10 | Skutskärs IF | 18 | 3 | 5 | 10 | 21 | – | 38 | -17 | 11 |

=== Division 2 Östra 1937–38 ===
| | Team | Pld | W | D | L | GF | | GA | GD | Pts |
|---|---|---|---|---|---|---|---|---|---|---|
| 1 | Hallstahammars SK | 18 | 13 | 0 | 5 | 41 | – | 19 | +22 | 26 |
| 2 | IFK Norrköping | 18 | 8 | 4 | 6 | 43 | – | 31 | +12 | 20 |
| 3 | Skärblacka IF | 18 | 9 | 2 | 7 | 37 | – | 35 | +2 | 20 |
| 4 | Surahammars IF | 18 | 8 | 3 | 7 | 32 | – | 30 | +2 | 19 |
| 5 | IFK Västerås | 18 | 7 | 4 | 7 | 34 | – | 22 | +12 | 18 |
| 6 | Mjölby AI | 18 | 8 | 2 | 8 | 28 | – | 30 | -2 | 18 |
| 7 | Motala AIF | 18 | 7 | 4 | 7 | 35 | – | 39 | -4 | 18 |
| 8 | IFK Eskilstuna | 18 | 5 | 6 | 7 | 41 | – | 43 | -2 | 16 |
| 9 | BK Derby | 18 | 5 | 4 | 9 | 27 | – | 36 | -9 | 14 |
| 10 | Katrineholms AIK | 18 | 4 | 3 | 11 | 20 | – | 53 | -33 | 11 |

=== Division 2 Västra 1937–38 ===
| | Team | Pld | W | D | L | GF | | GA | GD | Pts |
|---|---|---|---|---|---|---|---|---|---|---|
| 1 | Degerfors IF | 18 | 14 | 3 | 1 | 53 | – | 15 | +38 | 31 |
| 2 | Karlskoga IF | 18 | 12 | 1 | 5 | 43 | – | 23 | +20 | 25 |
| 3 | IK Tord | 18 | 11 | 1 | 6 | 40 | – | 25 | +15 | 23 |
| 4 | Billingsfors IK | 18 | 11 | 1 | 6 | 35 | – | 26 | +9 | 23 |
| 5 | Fässbergs IF | 18 | 8 | 3 | 7 | 39 | – | 45 | -6 | 19 |
| 6 | Arvika BK | 18 | 8 | 1 | 9 | 30 | – | 37 | -7 | 17 |
| 7 | Tidaholms GIF | 18 | 6 | 3 | 9 | 34 | – | 37 | -3 | 15 |
| 8 | Jonsereds IF | 18 | 4 | 5 | 9 | 27 | – | 31 | -4 | 13 |
| 9 | Alingsås IF | 18 | 3 | 4 | 11 | 20 | – | 42 | -22 | 10 |
| 10 | Karlstads BIK | 18 | 2 | 0 | 16 | 17 | – | 57 | -40 | 4 |

=== Division 2 Södra 1937–38 ===
| | Team | Pld | W | D | L | GF | | GA | GD | Pts |
|---|---|---|---|---|---|---|---|---|---|---|
| 1 | Malmö BI | 18 | 12 | 4 | 2 | 49 | – | 27 | +22 | 28 |
| 2 | IFK Trelleborg | 18 | 10 | 3 | 5 | 40 | – | 32 | +8 | 23 |
| 3 | BK Landora | 18 | 10 | 2 | 6 | 43 | – | 23 | +20 | 22 |
| 4 | Höganäs BK | 18 | 9 | 2 | 7 | 38 | – | 31 | +7 | 20 |
| 5 | Varbergs BoIS | 18 | 10 | 0 | 8 | 46 | – | 42 | +4 | 20 |
| 6 | Halmstads BK | 18 | 8 | 3 | 7 | 43 | – | 31 | +12 | 19 |
| 7 | IFK Värnamo | 18 | 7 | 5 | 6 | 40 | – | 32 | +8 | 19 |
| 8 | IS Halmia | 18 | 8 | 3 | 7 | 33 | – | 31 | +2 | 19 |
| 9 | IFK Kristianstad | 18 | 4 | 2 | 12 | 33 | – | 57 | -24 | 10 |
| 10 | IFK Helsingborg | 18 | 0 | 0 | 18 | 18 | – | 77 | -59 | 0 |

=== Division 2 promotion play-off 1937–38 ===
June 6, 1938

| Ludvika FfI | 1–0 | Skärgårdens IF |

?, ?
June 13, 1938

| Skärgårdens IF | 1–1 | Ludvika FfI |

?, ?

June 12, 1938

| Örebro IK | 0–3 | IF Rune |

?, ?
June 17, 1938

| IF Rune | 2–0 | Örebro IK |

?, ?

June 12, 1938

| Trollhättans IF | 1–2 | Oskarströms IF |

?, ?
June 19, 1938

| Oskarströms IF | 1–0 | Trollhättans IF |

?, ?

=== Norrländska Mästerskapet 1938 ===
Final

July 3, 1938

| Kramfors IF | 4–5 | Bodens BK |

Kramfors IP, Kramfors

== National team results ==
September 19, 1937
1937–47 Nordic Championship
№ 208

| Norway | 3–2 | Sweden |
|---|---|---|
| Brustad 44'; Isaksen 74'; Kvammen 76' | | Johansson 55'; Bunke 82' |

Ullevaal, Oslo
Attendance: 29,344
Referee: Barton (England)

Sweden: Gustav Sjöberg - Valter Lundgren, Walter Sköld - Erik Almgren, Gunnar Löfgren, Ernst Andersson - Georg Johansson, Erik "Lillis" Persson, Sven Jonasson, Lennart Bunke, Sixten Skoglund.

October 3, 1937
1937–47 Nordic Championship
№ 209

| Sweden | 1–2 | Denmark |
|---|---|---|
| Persson 86' | | Andersen 17'; Søbirk 53' |

Råsunda, Solna
Attendance: 38,259
Referee: Jerwell (England)

Sweden: Gustav Sjöberg - Valter Lundgren, Olle Källgren - Erik Almgren, Gunnar Löfgren, Ernst Andersson - Bertil Ericsson, Erik "Lillis" Persson, Sven Jonasson, Lennart Bunke, Åke Andersson.

November 21, 1937
1938 World Cup qualification
№ 210

| Germany | 5–0 | Sweden |
|---|---|---|
| Siffling 4', 57'; Szepan 7'; Schön 49', 73' |

Altonaer Stadion, Hamburg
Attendance: 50,500
Referee: Pfützner (Czechoslovakia)

Sweden: Sven Bergquist - Ivar Eriksson, Karl Johansson - Lars Flodin, Sven Nilsson, Karl-Erik Grahn - Malte Mårtensson, Lennart Carlsson-Askerlund, Arne Nyberg, Gunnar Bergström, Åke Andersson.

June 5, 1938
1938 World Cup 1st round
№ (never played)

| Sweden | w.o. | Austria |

Stade Gerland, Lyon
Attendance: –
Referee: –

June 10, 1938
Friendly
№ 211

| Sweden | 3–3 | Latvia |
|---|---|---|
| Bergström 4'; Hansson 26', 31' | | Krupšs 16'; Raisters 53'; Borduško 63' |

Råsunda, Solna
Attendance: 15,256
Referee: Aalto (Finland)

Sweden: Sven Bergquist - Harry Nilsson, Folke Lind - Fritz Berg, Arvid Emanuelsson, Einar Karlsson - Curt Bergsten, Erik Persson, Knut Hansson, Gunnar Bergström, Harry "Patly" Andersson.

June 12, 1938
1938 World Cup
quarter-finals
№ 212

| Sweden | 8–0 | Cuba |
|---|---|---|
| Andersson 9', 81', 89'; Wetterström 22', 37', 44'; Keller 80'; Nyberg 84' |

Stade du Fort Carré, Antibes
Attendance: 11,000
Referee: Krist (Czechoslovakia)

Sweden: Henock Abrahamsson - Ivar Eriksson, Olle Källgren - Erik Almgren, Sven Jacobsson, Kurt Svanström - Arne Nyberg, Sven Jonasson, Harry Andersson, Tore Keller, Gustav Wetterström.

June 15, 1938
Friendly
№ 213

| Sweden | 2–0 | Finland |
|---|---|---|
| Lagercrantz 9'; Bergström 70' |

Råsunda, Solna
Attendance: 12,079
Referee: Carlsen (Norway)

Sweden: Sven Bergquist - Valter Lundgren, Walter Sköld - Fritz Berg, Sven Andersson, Arthur Svensson - Gillis Andersson, Erik Persson, Floyd Lagercrantz, Gunnar Bergström, Harry "Patly" Andersson.

June 16, 1938
1938 World Cup
semi-finals
№ 214

| Hungary | 5–1 | Sweden |
|---|---|---|
| Jacobsson 19' (og); Titkos 37'; Zsengellér 39', 85'; Sárosi 65' | | Nyberg 1' |

Parc des Princes, Paris
Attendance: 20,000
Referee: Leclerq (France)

Sweden: Henock Abrahamsson - Ivar Eriksson, Olle Källgren - Erik Almgren, Sven Jacobsson, Kurt Svanström - Arne Nyberg, Sven Jonasson, Harry Andersson, Tore Keller, Gustav Wetterström.

June 19, 1938
1938 World Cup
3rd place match
№ 215

| Brazil | 4–2 | Sweden |
|---|---|---|
| Romeu 44'; Leônidas 62', 75'; Perácio 81' | | Jonasson 27'; Nyberg 39' |

Parc Lescure, Bordeaux
Attendance: 19,000
Referee: Langenus (Belgium)

Sweden: Henock Abrahamsson - Ivar Eriksson, Erik Nilsson - Erik Almgren, Arne Linderholm, Kurt Svanström - Arne Nyberg, Erik "Lillis" Persson, Harry Andersson, Sven Jonasson, Åke Andersson.

June 21, 1938
1937–47 Nordic Championship
№ 216

| Denmark | 0–1 | Sweden |
|---|---|---|
| | | Nyberg 35' |

Idrætsparken, Copenhagen
Attendance: 38,260
Referee: Kristiansen (Norway)

Sweden: Henock Abrahamsson - Erik Nilsson, Olle Källgren - Erik Almgren, Arne Linderholm, Arthur Svensson - Arne Nyberg, Gunnar Bergström, Sven Jonasson, Tore Keller, Gustav Wetterström.

July 4, 1938
1937–47 Nordic Championship
№ 217

| Finland | 2–4 | Sweden |
|---|---|---|
| Lintamo 2'; Granström 37' | | Lagercrantz 27', 67'; Bergström 51'; Nyberg 74' |

Olympiastadion, Helsinki
Attendance: 17,000
Referee: Bauwens (Germany)

Sweden: Henock Abrahamsson - Erik Nilsson, Olle Källgren - Erik Almgren, Arne Linderholm, Arthur Svensson - Arne Nyberg, Sven Jonasson, Floyd Lagercrantz, Gunnar Bergström, Åke Andersson.

== National team players in season 1937–38 ==
| name | pos. | caps | goals | club |
|---|---|---|---|---|
| Henock Abrahamsson | GK | 5 | 0 | Gårda BK |
| Erik Almgren | MF | 7 | 0 | AIK |
| Åke "Carnera" Andersson | FW | 4 | 0 | GAIS (3); AIK (1) |
| Ernst Andersson | MF | 2 | 0 | IFK Göteborg |
| Gillis Andersson | FW | 1 | 0 | IF Elfsborg |
| Harry Andersson | FW | 3 | 3 | IK Sleipner |
| Harry "Patly" Andersson | FW | 2 | 0 | IS Halmia |
| Sven "Vrålis" Andersson | MF | 1 | 0 | AIK |
| Fritz Berg | MF | 2 | 0 | IFK Göteborg |
| Sven "Svenne Berka" Bergquist (Bergqvist) | GK | 3 | 0 | Hammarby IF |
| Curt (Kurt) Bergsten | FW | 1 | 0 | Landskrona BoIS |
| Gunnar Bergström | FW | 5 | 3 | IK Brage |
| Lennart "Ledde" Bunke | FW | 2 | 1 | Hälsingborgs IF |
| Lennart Carlsson-Askerlund | FW | 1 | 0 | IFK Eskilstuna |
| Arvid "Emma" Emanuelsson | MF | 1 | 0 | IF Elfsborg |
| Bertil Ericsson | FW | 1 | 0 | Sandvikens IF |
| Ivar Eriksson | DF | 4 | 0 | Sandvikens IF |
| Lars Flodin | MF | 1 | 0 | Hälsingborgs IF |
| Karl-Erik Grahn | MF | 1 | 0 | IF Elfsborg |
| Knut "Buckla" Hansson | FW | 1 | 2 | Landskrona BoIS |
| Sven "Jack" Jacobsson | MF | 2 | 0 | GAIS |
| Georg "Massa" Johansson | FW | 1 | 1 | IK Brage |
| Karl Johansson | DF | 1 | 0 | IK Sleipner |
| Sven "Jonas" Jonasson | FW | 7 | 1 | IF Elfsborg |
| Olle "Plåten" Källgren | DF | 5 | 0 | Sandvikens IF |
| Einar Karlsson | MF | 1 | 0 | Gårda BK |
| Tore Keller | FW | 3 | 1 | IK Sleipner |
| Floyd Lagercrantz | FW | 2 | 3 | AIK |
| Folke Lind | DF | 1 | 0 | GAIS |
| Arne Linderholm | MF | 3 | 0 | IK Sleipner |
| Gunnar Löfgren | MF | 2 | 0 | IFK Göteborg |
| Valter Lundgren | DF | 3 | 0 | AIK |
| Malte "Svarta Blixten" Mårtensson | FW | 1 | 0 | Hälsingborgs IF |
| Erik Nilsson | DF | 3 | 0 | Malmö FF |
| Harry Nilsson | DF | 1 | 0 | Landskrona BoIS |
| Sven Nilsson | MF | 1 | 0 | Malmö FF |
| Arne Nyberg | FW | 6 | 5 | IFK Göteborg |
| Erik Persson | FW | 2 | 0 | Landskrona BoIS |
| Erik "Lillis" Persson | FW | 3 | 1 | AIK |
| Gustav "Gurra" Sjöberg | GK | 2 | 0 | AIK |
| Sixten "Jompa" Skoglund | FW | 1 | 0 | IK Brage |
| Walter Sköld | DF | 2 | 0 | AIK |
| Kurt Svanström | MF | 3 | 0 | Örgryte IS |
| Arthur Svensson | MF | 3 | 0 | AIK |
| Gustav "Gutta" Wetterström | FW | 3 | 3 | IK Sleipner |
