= 1938–39 in Swedish football =

The 1938-39 season in Swedish football, starting August 1938 and ending July 1939:

== Honours ==
=== Official titles ===
Title	Team	Reason
1938–39 Swedish Champions	IF Elfsborg	Winners of Allsvenskan

=== Competitions ===
Level	Competition	Team
1st level	Allsvenskan 1938–39	IF Elfsborg
2nd level	Division 2 Norra 1938–39	Hammarby IF
2nd level	Division 2 Östra 1938–39	IFK Norrköping
2nd level	Division 2 Västra 1938–39	IFK Göteborg
2nd level	Division 2 Södra 1938–39	Halmstads BK
Regional Championship	Norrländska Mästerskapet 1939	Domsjö IF

== Promotions, relegations and qualifications ==
=== Promotions ===
Promoted from	Promoted to	Team	Reason
Division 2 Norra 1938–39	Allsvenskan 1939–40	Hammarby IF	Winners of promotion play-off
Division 2 Västra 1938–39	Allsvenskan 1939–40	IFK Göteborg	Winners of promotion play-off
Division 3 1938–39	Division 2 Norra 1939–40	Nynäshamns IF	Winners of Östsvenska
Division 3 1938–39	Division 2 Norra 1939–40	Sandvikens AIK	Winners of promotion play-off
Division 3 1938–39	Division 2 Östra 1939–40	Finspångs AIK	Winners of Mellansvenska
Division 3 1938–39	Division 2 Östra 1939–40	IFK Kumla	Winners of promotion play-off
Division 3 1938–39	Division 2 Västra 1939–40	IF Örnen	Winners of Nordvästra
Division 3 1938–39	Division 2 Västra 1939–40	Skara IF	Winners of promotion play-off
Division 3 1938–39	Division 2 Södra 1939–40	Olofströms IF	Winners of Sydöstra
Division 3 1938–39	Division 2 Södra 1939–40	Ängelholms IF	Winners of Sydsvenska

=== League transfers ===
Transferred from	Transferred to	Team	Reason
Division 2 Östra 1938–39	Division 2 Norra 1939–40	IFK Västerås	Geographical composition

=== Relegations ===
Relegated from	Relegated to	Team	Reason
Allsvenskan 1938–39	Division 2 Västra 1939–40	Degerfors IF	11th team
Allsvenskan 1938–39	Division 2 Östra 1939–40	Hallstahammars SK	12th team
Division 2 Norra 1938–39	Division 3 1939–40	Bollnäs GIF	9th team
Division 2 Norra 1938–39	Division 3 1939–40	IFK Grängesberg	10th team
Division 2 Östra 1938–39	Division 3 1939–40	IF Rune	9th team
Division 2 Östra 1938–39	Division 3 1939–40	Motala AIF	10th team
Division 2 Västra 1938–39	Division 3 1939–40	Arvika BK	9th team
Division 2 Västra 1938–39	Division 3 1939–40	Fässbergs IF	10th team
Division 2 Södra 1938–39	Division 3 1939–40	Oskarströms IS	9th team
Division 2 Södra 1938–39	Division 3 1939–40	Kalmar AIK	10th team

== Domestic results ==
=== Allsvenskan 1938–39 ===

	Team	Pld	W	D	L	GF		GA	GD	Pts
1	IF Elfsborg	22	15	4	3	65	–	26	+39	34
2	AIK	22	11	3	8	49	–	34	+15	25
3	Malmö FF	22	9	7	6	30	–	29	+1	25
4	Landskrona BoIS	22	9	7	6	29	–	36	-7	25
5	Gårda BK	22	7	8	7	38	–	37	+1	22
6	IK Brage	22	6	9	7	33	–	38	-5	21
7	IK Sleipner	22	8	4	10	43	–	44	-1	20
8	Sandvikens IF	22	9	2	11	34	–	36	-2	20
9	Helsingborgs IF	22	7	6	9	29	–	33	-4	20
10	Örgryte IS	22	8	3	11	39	–	43	-4	19
11	Degerfors IF	22	9	1	12	43	–	52	-9	19
12	Hallstahammars SK	22	4	6	12	27	–	51	-29	14

=== Allsvenskan promotion play-off 1938–39 ===
June 4, 1939

IFK Norrköping	1–3	Hammarby IF

?, Norrköping
June 11, 1939

Hammarby IF	1–0	IFK Norrköping

?, Stockholm

June 4, 1939

Halmstads BK	0–3	IFK Göteborg

?, Halmstad
June 11, 1939

IFK Göteborg	2–1	Halmstads BK

?, Gothenburg

=== Division 2 Norra 1938–39 ===

	Team	Pld	W	D	L	GF		GA	GD	Pts
1	Hammarby IF	18	12	2	4	46	–	20	+26	26
2	Ludvika FfI	18	10	4	4	40	–	27	+13	24
3	Djurgårdens IF	18	9	4	5	43	–	32	+11	22
4	Ljusne AIK	18	7	6	5	41	–	28	+13	20
5	Reymersholms IK	18	7	6	5	40	–	30	+10	20
6	Värtans IK	18	8	2	8	29	–	28	+1	18
7	Gefle IF	18	7	3	8	37	–	37	0	17
8	Enköpings SK	18	5	5	8	27	–	43	-16	15
9	Bollnäs GIF	18	4	2	12	18	–	50	-32	10
10	IFK Grängesberg	18	2	4	12	26	–	52	-26	8

=== Division 2 Östra 1938–39 ===
	Team	Pld	W	D	L	GF		GA	GD	Pts
1	IFK Norrköping	18	13	3	2	44	–	15	+29	29
2	IFK Eskilstuna	18	13	2	3	59	–	19	+40	28
3	Skärblacka IF	18	11	2	5	47	–	25	+22	24
4	Surahammars IF	18	7	5	6	37	–	30	+7	19
5	Mjölby AI	18	7	3	8	33	–	35	-2	17
6	Husqvarna IF	18	7	3	8	29	–	55	-26	17
7	IK Tord	18	6	4	8	27	–	31	-4	16
8	IFK Västerås	18	6	3	9	31	–	35	-4	15
9	IF Rune	18	2	4	12	35	–	66	-31	10
10	Motala AIF	18	3	1	14	25	–	56	-30	7

=== Division 2 Västra 1938–39 ===
	Team	Pld	W	D	L	GF		GA	GD	Pts
1	IFK Göteborg	18	13	4	1	48	–	11	+37	30
2	GAIS	18	12	5	1	42	–	13	+29	29
3	Varbergs BoIS	18	12	2	4	38	–	22	+16	26
4	Tidaholms GIF	18	8	5	5	40	–	24	+16	21
5	Billingsfors IK	18	8	2	8	31	–	37	-6	18
6	Karlskoga IF	18	5	6	7	29	–	37	-8	16
7	Jonsereds IF	18	6	3	9	27	–	25	+2	15
8	Deje IK	18	3	4	11	27	–	45	-18	10
9	Arvika BK	18	2	4	12	28	–	63	-35	8
10	Fässbergs IF	18	2	3	13	21	–	54	-33	7

=== Division 2 Södra 1938–39 ===
	Team	Pld	W	D	L	GF		GA	GD	Pts
1	Halmstads BK	18	14	1	3	54	–	20	+34	29
2	IS Halmia	18	13	3	2	49	–	22	+27	29
3	BK Landora	18	9	4	5	38	–	30	+8	22
4	Malmö BI	18	9	1	8	39	–	39	0	19
5	IFK Trelleborg	18	8	3	7	42	–	42	0	19
6	IFK Värnamo	18	7	4	7	36	–	32	+4	18
7	IFK Malmö	18	6	2	10	41	–	49	-8	14
8	Höganäs BK	18	5	2	11	30	–	42	-12	12
9	Oskarströms IS	18	4	3	11	25	–	36	-11	11
10	Kalmar AIK	18	2	3	13	23	–	65	-42	7

=== Division 2 promotion play-off 1938–39 ===
June 4, 1939

Sandvikens AIK	0–0	Iggesunds IK

?, ?
June 11, 1939

Iggesunds IK	1–1	Sandvikens AIK

?, ?
June 18, 1939

Sandvikens AIK	3–1	Iggesunds IK

?, ?

June 4, 1939

Katrineholms AIK	1–3	IFK Kumla

?, ?
June 11, 1939

IFK Kumla	5–1	Katrineholms AIK

?, ?

June 4, 1939

Skara IF	5–1	Skogens IF

?, ?
June 7, 1939

Skogens IF	3–0	Skara IF

?, ?
June 11, 1939

Skara IF	3–1	Skogens IF

?, ?

=== Norrländska Mästerskapet 1939 ===
Final

July 23, 1939

Domsjö IF	1–1 2–1 (aet)	Bodens BK

?, Domsjö

== National team results ==
August 7, 1938
Friendly
№ 218

Sweden	2–6	Czechoslovakia
Bergström 54'; Nyberg 61'		Horák 13'; Bican 29', 33', 79'; Senecký 72', 88'

Råsunda, Solna
Attendance: 20,927
Referee: Capdeville (France)

Sweden: Henock Abrahamsson - Erik Nilsson, Olle Källgren - Erik Almgren, Arne Linderholm, Arthur Svensson - Arne Nyberg, Sven Jonasson, Knut Hansson, Gunnar Bergström, Åke Andersson.

September 4, 1938
Friendly
№ 219

Norway	2–1	Sweden
Arnesen 22'; Brynhildsen 62'		Hansson 15'

Ullevaal, Oslo
Attendance: 33,000
Referee: Laursen (Denmark)

Sweden: Gustav Sjöberg - Erik Nilsson, Olle Källgren - Erik Almgren, Arne Linderholm, Arthur Svensson - Arne Nyberg, Sven Jonasson, Knut Hansson, Gunnar Bergström, Arne Bryngelsson.

October 2, 1938
1937–47 Nordic Championship
№ 220

Sweden	2–3	Norway
Persson 27'; Nyberg 66'		Brustad 16'; Brynhildsen 18'; Nordahl 35'

Råsunda, Solna
Attendance: 38,112
Referee: Jerwell (England)

Sweden: Gustav Sjöberg - Erik Nilsson, Olle Källgren - Erik Almgren, Arvid Emanuelsson, Arthur Svensson - Arne Nyberg, Erik Persson, Knut Hansson, Sven Jonasson, Arne Bryngelsson.

June 2, 1939
Friendly
№ 221

Sweden	3–2	Norway
Martinsson 59'; Andersson 69'; Persson 84'		Frantzen 39', 43'

Råsunda, Solna
Attendance: 28,283
Referee: Laursen (Denmark)

Sweden: Sven Bergquist - Harry Nilsson, Erik Nilsson - Kurt Svanström, Arvid Emanuelsson, Karl-Erik Grahn - Curt Hjelm, Erik Persson, Fridolf Martinsson, Gunnar Bergström, Åke Andersson.

June 9, 1939
1937–47 Nordic Championship
№ 222

Sweden	5–1	Finland
Andersson 13'; Persson 30', 64', 67'; Grahn 35' (p)		Nilsson 10' (og)

Råsunda, Solna
Attendance: 16,862
Referee: Randers-Johansen (Norway)

Sweden: Sven Bergquist - Harry Nilsson, Erik Nilsson - Kurt Svanström, Arvid Emanuelsson, Karl-Erik Grahn - Arne Nyberg, Erik Persson, Fridolf Martinsson, Gunnar Bergström, Åke Andersson.

June 11, 1939
Friendly
№ 223

Sweden	7–0	Lithuania
Larsson 1', 87'; Hjelm 9', 12'; Nyström 31'; Lundin 59' (p); Karlsson 72'

Tingvalla IP, Karlstad
Attendance: 5,631
Referee: Daehlen (Norway)

Sweden: Erik Andersson - Erik Eriksson, Erik Lundin - Roland Lindberg, Sven Jacobsson, Göte Ellström - Stig Nyström, Curt Hjelm, Knut Johansson, Willis Karlsson, Ragnar Larsson.

June 14, 1939
Jubilee tournament
(DBU - 50)
semi-finals
№ 224

Norway	1–0	Sweden
Martinsen 83'

Idrætsparken, Copenhagen
Attendance: 18,000
Referee: Birlem (Germany)

Sweden: Sven Bergquist - Harry Nilsson, Erik Nilsson - Kurt Svanström, Arvid Emanuelsson, Karl-Erik Grahn - Arne Nyberg, Erik Persson, Fridolf Martinsson, Gunnar Bergström, Åke Andersson.

== National team players in season 1938/39 ==
name	pos.	caps	goals	club
Henock Abrahamsson	GK	1	0	Gårda BK
Erik Almgren	MF	3	0	AIK
Åke "Carnera" Andersson	FW	4	2	AIK
Erik "Fjösarn" Andersson	GK	1	0	Landskrona BoIS
Sven "Svenne Berka" Bergquist (Bergqvist)	GK	3	0	Hammarby IF
Gunnar Bergström	FW	5	1	IK Brage
Arne Bryngelsson	FW	2	0	Sandvikens IF
Göte Ellström	MF	1	0	Örgryte IS
Arvid "Emma" Emanuelsson	MF	4	0	IF Elfsborg
Erik Eriksson	DF	1	0	IK Brage
Karl-Erik Grahn	MF	3	1	IF Elfsborg
Knut "Buckla" Hansson	FW	3	1	Landskrona BoIS
Curt Hjelm	FW	2	2	IK Sleipner
Sven "Jack" Jacobsson	MF	1	0	GAIS
Knut Johansson	FW	1	0	IF Elfsborg
Sven "Jonas" Jonasson	FW	3	0	IF Elfsborg
Olle "Plåten" Källgren	DF	3	0	Sandvikens IF
Willis Karlsson (Carlsson)	FW	1	1	Billingsfors IK
Ragnar Larsson	FW	1	2	IFK Eskilstuna
Roland Lindberg	MF	1	0	Gårda BK
Arne Linderholm	MF	2	0	IK Sleipner
Erik Lundin	DF	1	1	Degerfors IF
Fridolf Martinsson	FW	3	1	Örgryte IS
Erik Nilsson	DF	6	0	Malmö FF
Harry Nilsson	DF	3	0	Landskrona BoIS
Arne Nyberg	FW	5	2	IFK Göteborg
Stig Nyström	FW	1	1	IK Brage
Erik "Lillis" Persson	FW	4	5	AIK
Gustav "Gurra" Sjöberg	GK	2	0	AIK
Kurt Svanström	MF	3	0	Örgryte IS
Arthur Svensson	MF	3	0	AIK
