= 1940–41 Division 3 (Swedish football) =

Swedish League Division 3
- Season: 1940–41
- Champions: Ljusne AIK; Avesta AIK; Brynäs IF; IFK Lidingö; Västerås SK; IK City; Karlstads BIK; IFK Åmål; Skärblacka IF; Waggeryds IK; Nybro IF; Karlskrona BK; IF Heimer; Skogens IF; Anderstorps IF; IFK Trelleborg
- Promoted: 8 teams
- Relegated: 21 teams

Statistics of Swedish football Division 3 for the 1940–41 season.

== League standings ==
=== Uppsvenska Sydöstra 1940–41 ===
Pos	Team	Pld	W	D	L	GF	GA	GD	Pts	Promotion or relegation
1	Ljusne AIK	16	13	3	0	62	11	+51	29	Promotion Playoffs – Promoted
2	Iggesunds IK	16	12	3	1	59	20	+39	27	
3	Söderhamns IF	16	8	3	5	29	29	0	19	
4	Hudiksvalls IF	16	6	5	5	32	29	+3	17	
5	Alfta GIF	16	6	2	8	21	34	−13	14	
6	Skärgårdens IF, Sandarne	16	5	2	9	44	38	+6	12	
7	Strands IF, Hudiksvall	16	4	3	9	20	30	−10	11	
8	Bollnäs GIF	16	4	3	9	18	43	−25	11	
9	Ala IF	16	1	2	13	15	66	−51	4	Relegated

=== Uppsvenska Sydvästra 1940–41 ===
Pos	Team	Pld	W	D	L	GF	GA	GD	Pts	Qualification or relegation
1	Avesta AIK	14	9	2	3	44	29	+15	20	Promotion Playoffs
2	IFK Grängesberg	14	7	4	3	49	18	+31	18	
3	IFK Hedemora	14	6	3	5	44	39	+5	15	
4	Långshyttans AIK	14	6	3	5	28	23	+5	15	
5	IFK Mora	14	6	3	5	39	42	−3	15	
6	Avesta IF	14	5	4	5	21	31	−10	14	
7	Fagersta AIK	14	3	3	8	22	43	−21	9	
8	Forssa BK	14	2	2	10	24	46	−22	6	Relegated

=== Östsvenska Norra 1940–41 ===
Pos	Team	Pld	W	D	L	GF	GA	GD	Pts	Qualification or relegation
1	Brynäs IF, Gävle	14	10	2	2	41	28	+13	22	Promotion Playoffs
2	Forsbacka IK	14	8	3	3	32	17	+15	19	
3	IK Huge, Gävle	14	7	4	3	35	25	+10	18	
4	Skutskärs IF	14	7	3	4	31	21	+10	17	
5	Örtakoloniens IF, Sandviken	14	7	2	5	31	15	+16	16	
6	Högbo AIK	14	4	3	7	32	38	−6	11	
7	Söderfors GIF	14	4	0	10	32	40	−8	8	
8	Älvkarleby IK	14	0	1	13	13	63	−50	1	Relegated

=== Östsvenska Södra 1940–41 ===
Pos	Team	Pld	W	D	L	GF	GA	GD	Pts	Promotion or relegation
1	IFK Lidingö	18	13	4	1	75	22	+53	30	Promotion Playoffs – Promoted
2	Årsta SK, Stockholm	18	12	3	3	66	28	+38	27	
3	Hagalunds IS, Solna	18	11	4	3	62	31	+31	26	
4	Enskede IK	18	10	5	3	90	27	+63	25	
5	IK Tellus, Stockholm	18	10	1	7	53	27	+26	21	
6	IF Olympia, Stockholm	18	8	3	7	40	31	+9	19	
7	Södertälje SK	18	7	3	8	56	48	+8	17	
8	IK Sture, Stockholm	18	5	1	12	46	60	−14	11	
9	IF Ferro, Herräng	18	2	0	16	12	117	−105	4	Relegated
10	Enebybergs IF	18	0	0	18	5	114	−109	0	Relegated

=== Centralserien Norra 1940–41 ===
Pos	Team	Pld	W	D	L	GF	GA	GD	Pts	Promotion or relegation
1	Västerås SK	14	10	1	3	40	24	+16	21	Promotion Playoffs
2	Västerås IK	14	7	2	5	30	17	+13	16	
3	Enköpings SK	14	7	2	5	37	32	+5	16	
4	IF Vesta, Uppsala	14	6	2	6	27	25	+2	14	
5	Skultuna IS	14	6	1	7	23	38	−15	13	
6	Köpings IS	14	5	2	7	26	30	−4	12	
7	Kolsva IF	14	5	1	8	23	27	−4	11	
8	Ramnäs IF	14	4	1	9	19	32	−13	9	Relegated

=== Centralserien Södra 1940–41 ===
Pos	Team	Pld	W	D	L	GF	GA	GD	Pts	Promotion or relegation
1	IK City, Eskilstuna	14	11	1	2	43	11	+32	23	Promotion Playoffs – Promoted
2	IF Verdandi, Eskilstuna	14	9	1	4	41	21	+20	19	
3	IF Rune, Kungsör	14	8	1	5	35	25	+10	17	
4	Tunafors SK, Eskilstuna	14	7	0	7	32	21	+11	14	
5	IFK Kumla	14	6	2	6	22	28	−6	14	
6	IFK Nora	14	5	2	7	22	29	−7	12	
7	IFK Lindesberg	14	4	0	10	22	48	−26	8	Relegated
8	BK Forward, Örebro	14	1	3	10	14	48	−34	5	Relegated

=== Nordvästra Norra 1940–41 ===
Pos	Team	Pld	W	D	L	GF	GA	GD	Pts	Promotion or relegation
1	Karlstads BIK	16	9	6	1	48	24	+24	24	Promotion Playoffs – Promoted
2	IFK Bofors	16	9	5	2	48	24	+24	23	
3	Forshaga IF	16	7	3	6	49	36	+13	17	
4	IF Örnen, Kristinehamn	16	6	3	7	42	34	+8	15	
5	Nykroppa AIK	16	5	5	6	42	46	−4	15	
6	Storfors FF	16	7	0	9	45	44	+1	14	
7	Hällefors AIF	16	6	2	8	33	45	−12	14	
8	IFK Sunne	16	5	1	10	38	61	−23	11	Relegated
9	IFK Kristinehamn	16	5	1	10	25	56	−31	11	Relegated

=== Nordvästra Södra 1940–41 ===
Pos	Team	Pld	W	D	L	GF	GA	GD	Pts	Qualification
1	IFK Åmål	16	12	2	2	48	23	+25	26	Promotion Playoffs
2	IFK Uddevalla	16	11	1	4	57	19	+38	23	
3	Munkedals IF	16	9	3	4	39	23	+16	21	
4	Mustadfors IF	16	8	2	6	42	47	−5	18	
5	Ödeborgs IF	16	7	2	7	29	46	−17	16	
6	Håfreströms IF	16	4	3	9	21	40	−19	11	
7	Stigens IF	16	5	0	11	36	44	−8	10	
8	IK Svane	16	3	4	9	25	33	−8	10	
9	Uddevalla IS	16	4	1	11	31	53	−22	9	

=== Mellansvenska Norra 1940–41 ===
Pos	Team	Pld	W	D	L	GF	GA	GD	Pts	Qualification or relegation
1	Skärblacka IF	18	15	0	3	73	27	+46	30	Promotion Playoffs
2	Motala AIF	18	13	1	4	57	32	+25	27	
3	Nyköpings AIK	18	9	4	5	59	41	+18	22	
4	BK Derby, Linköping	18	8	4	6	47	34	+13	20	
5	Katrineholms AIK	18	8	1	9	41	34	+7	17	
6	Boxholms IF	18	7	2	9	32	53	−21	16	
7	Karle IF	18	6	3	9	31	42	−11	15	
8	Katrineholms SK	18	6	2	10	36	46	−10	14	
9	Nyköpings SK	18	5	3	10	32	56	−24	13	Relegated
10	Vadstena GIF	18	3	0	15	27	70	−43	6	Relegated

=== Mellansvenska Södra 1940–41 ===
Pos	Team	Pld	W	D	L	GF	GA	GD	Pts	Promotion or relegation
1	Waggeryds IK	14	9	2	3	50	22	+28	20	Promotion Playoffs – Promoted
2	IK Tord, Jönköping	14	7	4	3	43	25	+18	18	
3	Nässjö IF	14	6	5	3	40	24	+16	17	
4	Jönköping Södra IF	14	5	5	4	37	30	+7	15	
5	Västerviks AIS	14	6	2	6	34	37	−3	14	
6	Vetlanda FF	14	6	0	8	20	48	−28	12	
7	Norrahammars GIS	14	5	1	8	30	41	−11	11	Relegated
8	Tranås AIF	14	1	3	10	15	42	−27	5	Relegated

=== Sydöstra Norra 1940–41 ===
Pos	Team	Pld	W	D	L	GF	GA	GD	Pts	Promotion or relegation
1	Nybro IF	14	12	0	2	38	15	+23	24	Promotion Playoffs – Promoted
2	Kalmar FF	14	10	0	4	55	24	+31	20	
3	IFK Oskarshamn	14	7	1	6	33	28	+5	15	
4	Lessebo GIF	14	6	2	6	42	33	+9	14	
5	Blomstermåla IK	14	6	1	7	32	33	−1	13	
6	Växjö BK	14	6	1	7	37	39	−2	13	
7	Hovmantorps GIF	14	5	2	7	28	37	−9	12	Relegated
8	Alstermo IF	14	0	1	13	14	70	−56	1	Relegated

=== Sydöstra Södra 1940–41 ===
Pos	Team	Pld	W	D	L	GF	GA	GD	Pts	Qualification or relegation
1	Karlskrona BK	16	12	2	2	52	24	+28	26	Promotion Playoffs
2	Sölvesborgs GIF	16	9	1	6	31	19	+12	19	
3	Högadals IS	16	8	2	6	32	34	−2	18	
4	Bromölla IF	16	6	5	5	39	31	+8	17	
5	IFK Karlskrona	16	6	4	6	35	37	−2	16	
6	Kallinge SK	16	7	1	8	31	36	−5	15	
7	IFK Karlshamn	16	5	2	9	36	34	+2	12	
8	Gammalstorps GIF	16	5	2	9	34	39	−5	12	
9	IFK Ronneby	16	3	3	10	23	59	−36	9	Relegated

=== Västsvenska Norra 1940–41 ===
Pos	Team	Pld	W	D	L	GF	GA	GD	Pts	Qualification or relegation
1	IF Heimer, Lidköping	14	12	2	0	41	9	+32	26	Promotion Playoffs
2	IFK Trollhättan	14	9	3	2	38	16	+22	21	
3	Trollhättans IF	14	7	2	5	34	26	+8	16	
4	Kinna IF	14	5	2	7	26	25	+1	12	
5	Vänersborgs IF	14	5	0	9	20	24	−4	10	
6	Alingsås IF	14	4	2	8	24	30	−6	10	
7	Svaneholms IF	14	4	2	8	15	41	−26	10	
8	IFK Tidaholm	14	3	1	10	12	39	−27	7	Relegated

=== Västsvenska Södra 1940–41 ===
Pos	Team	Pld	W	D	L	GF	GA	GD	Pts	Promotion or relegation
1	Skogens IF, Göteborg	18	14	2	2	79	22	+57	30	Promotion Playoffs – Promoted
2	IK Virgo, Göteborg	18	13	2	3	52	20	+32	28	
3	Jonsereds IF	18	9	5	4	46	26	+20	23	
4	Krokslätts FF, Mölndal	18	8	5	5	43	39	+4	21	
5	Hisingstads IS, Hisingen	18	9	1	8	43	42	+1	19	
6	Majornas IK, Göteborg	18	6	6	6	36	17	+19	18	
7	Haga IF, Göteborg	18	6	3	9	29	52	−23	15	
8	IK Kongahälla, Kungälv	18	3	4	11	24	69	−45	10	
9	Göteborgs AIK	18	2	4	12	21	49	−28	8	
10	Fässbergs IF, Mölndal	18	3	2	13	21	58	−37	8	Relegated

=== Sydsvenska Norra 1940–41 ===
Pos	Team	Pld	W	D	L	GF	GA	GD	Pts	Qualification
1	Anderstorps IF	16	12	2	2	60	27	+33	26	Promotion Playoffs
2	Falkenbergs FF	16	12	0	4	51	19	+32	24	
3	Oskarströms IS	16	9	1	6	34	30	+4	19	
4	Nyhems BK, Halmstad	16	8	2	6	31	28	+3	18	
5	Gislaveds IS	16	7	1	8	31	30	+1	15	
6	Varbergs GIF	16	5	3	8	30	56	−26	13	
7	Alets IK	16	3	4	9	30	35	−5	10	
8	Hyltebruks IF	16	4	2	10	28	52	−24	10	
9	Arvidstorps IK	16	4	1	11	21	39	−18	9	

=== Sydsvenska Södra 1940–41 ===
Pos	Team	Pld	W	D	L	GF	GA	GD	Pts	Promotion or relegation
1	IFK Trelleborg	18	9	6	3	45	35	+10	24	Promotion Playoffs – Promoted
2	IFK Hässleholm	18	10	3	5	44	21	+23	23	
3	IFK Höganäs	18	10	2	6	33	34	−1	22	
4	Klippans BoIF	18	8	4	6	46	35	+11	20	
5	Sofielunds IF, Malmö	18	8	3	7	40	46	−6	19	
6	BK Drott, Hälsingborg	18	7	4	7	42	34	+8	18	
7	Bjuvs IF	18	7	3	8	34	45	−11	17	
8	Ängelholms IF	18	7	1	10	40	42	−2	15	
9	Limhamns IF	18	3	7	8	28	38	−10	13	Relegated
10	Stattena IF, Hälsingborg	18	3	3	12	29	51	−22	9	Relegated
