= 1941–42 in Swedish football =

The 1941–42 season in Swedish football, starting August 1941 and ending July 1942:

== Honours ==
=== Official titles ===
Title	Team	Reason
1941–42 Swedish Champions	IFK Göteborg	Winners of Allsvenskan
1941 Swedish Cup Champions	Helsingborgs IF	Winners of Svenska Cupen

=== Competitions ===
Level	Competition	Team
1st level	Allsvenskan 1941–42	IFK Göteborg
2nd level	Division 2 Norra 1941–42	IK Brage
2nd level	Division 2 Östra 1941–42	IFK Eskilstuna
2nd level	Division 2 Västra 1941–42	Lundby IF
2nd level	Division 2 Södra 1941–42	Halmstads BK
Regional Championship	Norrländska Mästerskapet 1942	GIF Sundsvall
Cup	Svenska Cupen 1941	Helsingborgs IF

== Promotions, relegations and qualifications ==
=== Promotions ===
Promoted from	Promoted to	Team	Reason
Division 2 Östra 1941–42	Allsvenskan 1942–43	IFK Eskilstuna	Winners of promotion play-off
Division 2 Södra 1941–42	Allsvenskan 1942–43	Halmstads BK	Winners of promotion play-off
Division 3 1941–42	Division 2 Norra 1942–43	Hagalunds IS	Winners of promotion play-off
Division 3 1941–42	Division 2 Östra 1942–43	Avesta AIK	Winners of promotion play-off
Division 3 1941–42	Division 2 Östra 1942–43	Nyköpings AIK	Winners of promotion play-off
Division 3 1941–42	Division 2 Östra 1942–43	IF Verdandi	Winners of promotion play-off
Division 3 1941–42	Division 2 Västra 1942–43	IFK Trollhättan	Winners of promotion play-off
Division 3 1941–42	Division 2 Västra 1942–43	IFK Uddevalla	Winners of promotion play-off
Division 3 1941–42	Division 2 Södra 1942–43	Bromölla IF	Winners of promotion play-off
Division 3 1941–42	Division 2 Södra 1942–43	Varbergs BoIS	Winners of promotion play-off

=== Relegations ===
Relegated from	Relegated to	Team	Reason
Allsvenskan 1941–42	Division 2 Södra 1942–43	Landskrona BoIS	11th team
Allsvenskan 1941–42	Division 2 Norra 1942–43	Reymersholms IK	12th team
Division 2 Norra 1941–42	Division 3 1942–43	Ljusne AIK	9th team
Division 2 Norra 1941–42	Division 3 1942–43	IFK Lidingö	10th team
Division 2 Östra 1941–42	Division 3 1942–43	IK City	9th team
Division 2 Östra 1941–42	Division 3 1942–43	Mjölby AI	10th team
Division 2 Västra 1941–42	Division 3 1942–43	Karlstads BIK	9th team
Division 2 Västra 1941–42	Division 3 1942–43	Skara IF	10th team
Division 2 Södra 1941–42	Division 3 1942–43	Kalmar AIK	9th team
Division 2 Södra 1941–42	Division 3 1942–43	IFK Kristianstad	10th team

== Domestic results ==
=== Allsvenskan 1941–42 ===

	Team	Pld	W	D	L	GF		GA	GD	Pts
1	IFK Göteborg	22	14	3	5	48	–	29	+19	31
2	GAIS	22	10	7	5	46	–	31	+15	27
3	IFK Norrköping	22	12	2	8	50	–	35	+15	26
4	Helsingborgs IF	22	11	4	7	42	–	27	+15	26
5	Malmö FF	22	9	7	6	37	–	33	+4	25
6	Degerfors IF	22	9	5	8	43	–	35	+8	23
7	IF Elfsborg	22	8	6	8	35	–	29	+6	22
8	Gårda BK	22	9	4	9	34	–	46	-12	22
9	AIK	22	7	7	8	37	–	34	+3	21
10	Sandvikens IF	22	6	3	13	27	–	45	-18	15
11	Landskrona BoIS	22	5	4	13	22	–	47	-25	14
12	Reymersholms IK	22	4	4	14	27	–	57	-30	12

=== Allsvenskan promotion play-off 1941–42 ===
May 31, 1942

IFK Eskilstuna	3–0	IK Brage

?, Eskilstuna
June 7, 1942

IK Brage	4–1	IFK Eskilstuna

?, Borlänge
June 14, 1942

IFK Eskilstuna	2–0	IK Brage

?, Solna

May 31, 1942

Lundby IF	1–1	Halmstads BK

?, Gothenburg
June 7, 1942

Halmstads BK	2–1	Lundby IF

?, Halmstad

=== Division 2 Norra 1941–42 ===

	Team	Pld	W	D	L	GF		GA	GD	Pts
1	IK Brage	18	10	4	4	49	–	22	+27	24
2	Hammarby IF	18	9	6	3	55	–	35	+20	24
3	Sandvikens AIK	18	10	2	6	39	–	25	+14	22
4	Hofors AIF	18	7	4	7	31	–	37	-6	18
5	Djurgårdens IF	18	6	4	8	27	–	26	+1	16
6	Ludvika FfI	18	7	2	9	39	–	44	-5	16
7	Sundbybergs IK	18	4	7	7	30	–	38	-8	15
8	Gefle IF	18	4	7	7	33	–	43	-10	15
9	Ljusne AIK	18	6	3	9	42	–	57	-15	15
10	IFK Lidingö	18	7	1	10	32	–	50	-18	15

=== Division 2 Östra 1941–42 ===
	Team	Pld	W	D	L	GF		GA	GD	Pts
1	IFK Eskilstuna	18	12	4	2	46	–	22	+24	28
2	Surahammars IF	18	10	3	5	31	–	23	+8	23
3	IK Sleipner	18	9	4	5	38	–	24	+14	22
4	Örebro SK	18	9	3	6	35	–	30	+5	21
5	Hallstahammars SK	18	8	3	7	28	–	28	0	19
6	Finspångs AIK	18	7	4	7	37	–	43	-6	18
7	IFK Västerås	18	4	7	7	28	–	29	-1	15
8	Åtvidabergs FF	18	5	5	8	30	–	33	-3	15
9	IK City	18	5	5	8	23	–	29	-6	15
10	Mjölby AI	18	2	0	16	17	–	52	-35	4

=== Division 2 Västra 1941–42 ===
	Team	Pld	W	D	L	GF		GA	GD	Pts
1	Lundby IF	18	13	3	2	60	–	20	+40	29
2	Tidaholms GIF	18	12	2	4	50	–	35	+15	26
3	Örgryte IS	18	7	7	4	36	–	28	+8	21
4	Karlskoga IF	18	7	5	6	33	–	24	+9	19
5	Billingsfors IK	18	9	1	8	40	–	36	+4	19
6	Skogens IF	18	7	3	8	40	–	50	-10	17
7	Waggeryds IK	18	5	6	7	43	–	52	-9	16
8	Deje IK	18	5	3	10	30	–	45	-15	13
9	Karlstads BIK	18	4	3	11	33	–	50	-17	11
10	Skara IF	18	3	3	12	22	–	47	-25	9

=== Division 2 Södra 1941–42 ===
	Team	Pld	W	D	L	GF		GA	GD	Pts
1	Halmstads BK	18	13	1	4	55	–	20	+35	27
2	IS Halmia	18	12	1	5	46	–	23	+23	25
3	Höganäs BK	18	9	2	7	38	–	33	+5	20
4	Nybro IF	18	9	1	8	39	–	37	+2	19
5	BK Landora	18	7	2	9	42	–	42	0	16
6	Olofströms IF	18	7	2	9	32	–	41	-9	16
7	IFK Trelleborg	18	7	2	9	31	–	44	-13	16
8	IFK Malmö	18	6	3	9	32	–	50	-18	15
9	Kalmar AIK	18	6	2	10	38	–	51	-13	14
10	IFK Kristianstad	18	5	2	11	31	–	43	-12	12

=== Division 2 promotion play-off 1941–42 ===
1st round

May 17, 1942

IFK Åmål	1–1	IFK Uddevalla

?, ?
May 25, 1942

IFK Uddevalla	1–1	IFK Åmål

?, ?
May 28, 1942

IFK Åmål	?–? 1–3 (aet)	IFK Uddevalla

?, ?

2nd round

June 7, 1942

Iggesunds IK	1–1	Avesta AIK

?, ?
June 14, 1942

Avesta AIK	2–1	Iggesunds IK

?, ?

May 31, 1942

Örtakoloniens IF	1–1	Hagalunds IS

?, ?
June 7, 1942

Hagalunds IS	9–0	Örtakoloniens IF

?, ?

May 31, 1942

Västerås IK	0–2	IF Verdandi

?, ?
June 7, 1942

IF Verdandi	5–1	Västerås IK

?, ?

May 31, 1942

Storfors FF	3–3	IFK Uddevalla

?, ?
June 7, 1942

IFK Uddevalla	3–0	Storfors FF

?, ?

May 31, 1942

IFK Trollhättan	2–1	Krokslätts FF

?, ?
June 7, 1942

Krokslätts FF	0–2	IFK Trollhättan

?, ?

May 31, 1942

Varbergs BoIS	3–0	Klippans BIF

?, ?
June 7, 1942

Klippans BIF	2–1	Varbergs BoIS

?, ?
June 14, 1942

Varbergs BoIS	2–0	Klippans BIF

?, ?

May 31, 1942

Husqvarna IF	3–0	Nyköpings AIK

?, ?
June 7, 1942

Nyköpings AIK	4–0	Husqvarna IF

?, ?
May 31, 1942

Husqvarna IF	0–1	Nyköpings AIK

?, ?

May 31, 1942

IFK Oskarshamn	3–0	Bromölla IF

?, ?
June 7, 1942

Bromölla IF	6–3	IFK Oskarshamn

?, ?
May 31, 1942

IFK Oskarshamn	4–5	Bromölla IF

?, ?

=== Norrländska Mästerskapet 1942 ===
Final

July 19, 1942

GIF Sundsvall	2–1	IFK Holmsund

Idrottsparken, Sundsvall

=== Svenska Cupen 1941 ===
Final

October 26, 1941

Helsingborgs IF	3–1	IK Sleipner

Råsunda, Solna

== National team results ==
September 14, 1941
Friendly
№ 231

Sweden	2–2	Denmark
Carlsson 71'; Jacobsson 74'		Pløger 25'; Hansen 39'

Råsunda, Solna
Attendance: 33,894
Referee: Fink (Germany)

Sweden: Sven Bergquist - Harry Nilsson, Hilding Gustafsson - Erik Persson, Arvid Emanuelsson, Karl-Erik Grahn - Arne Nyberg, Gunnar Gren, Sven Jacobsson, Henry Carlsson, Åke Andersson.

October 5, 1941
Friendly
№ 232

Sweden	4–2	Germany
Carlsson 24', 49', 80'; Mårtensson 28'		Lehner 29'; Walter 89'

Råsunda, Solna
Attendance: 36,532
Referee: Laursen (Denmark)

Sweden: Sven Bergquist - Harry Nilsson, Hilding Gustafsson ( Börje Leander) - Erik Persson, Arvid Emanuelsson, Karl-Erik Grahn - Malte Mårtensson, Erik Holmqvist, Oskar Holmqvist, Henry Carlsson, Åke Andersson.

October 19, 1941
Friendly
№ 233

Denmark	2–1	Sweden
Pløger 57'; Hansen 74'		Holmqvist 61'

Idrætsparken, Copenhagen
Attendance: 42,360
Referee: Viinioksa (Finland)

Sweden: Sven Bergquist - Harry Nilsson, Hilding Gustafsson - Erik Persson, Arvid Emanuelsson, Karl-Erik Grahn - Malte Mårtensson, Erik Holmqvist, Oskar Holmqvist, Henry Carlsson, Åke Andersson.

June 28, 1942
Friendly
№ 234

Denmark	0–3	Sweden
		Hansen 38' (og); Nordahl 40'; Carlsson 68'

Idrætsparken, Copenhagen
Attendance: 40,360
Referee: Alho (Finland)

Sweden: Sven Bergquist - Harry Nilsson, Rickard Ödéhn - Erik Persson, Arvid Emanuelsson, Karl-Erik Grahn - Malte Mårtensson, Gunnar Gren, Gunnar Nordahl, Henry Carlsson, Jan Östlund.

== National team players in season 1941/42 ==
name	pos.	caps	goals	club
Åke "Carnera" Andersson	FW	3	0	AIK
Sven "Svenne Berka" Bergquist (Bergqvist)	GK	4	0	Hammarby IF
Henry "Garvis" Carlsson	FW	4	5	AIK
Arvid "Emma" Emanuelsson	MF	4	0	IF Elfsborg
Karl-Erik Grahn	MF	4	0	IF Elfsborg
Gunnar "Il Professore" Gren	FW	2	0	IFK Göteborg
Hilding "Moggli" Gustafsson	DF	3	0	Reymersholms IK
Erik "Mulle" Holmqvist (Holmquist); Eric Holmqvist	FW	2	0	IFK Norrköping
Oskar "Masse" Holmqvist (Holmquist); Oscar Holmqvist	FW	2	1	IFK Norrköping
Sven "Jack" Jacobsson	FW	1	1	GAIS
Börje Leander	MF	1	0	AIK
Malte "Svarta Blixten" Mårtensson	FW	3	1	Hälsingborgs IF
Harry Nilsson	DF	4	0	Landskrona BoIS (3); AIK (1)
Gunnar Nordahl	FW	1	1	Degerfors IF
Arne Nyberg	FW	1	0	IFK Göteborg
Rickard (Richard) Ödéhn	DF	1	0	IF Elfsborg
Jan Östlund	FW	1	0	Halmstads BK
Erik Persson	MF	4	0	Landskrona BoIS
