= 1937–38 Division 3 (Swedish football) =

Swedish League Division 3
- Season: 1937–38
- Champions: Skärgårdens IF; Ludvika FFI; Enköpings SK; Örebro IK; IF Rune; Deje IK; Husqvarna IF; Kalmar AIK; Trollhättans IF; Oskarströms IS; IFK Malmö
- Promoted: 8 teams
- Relegated: 22 teams

Statistics of Swedish football Division 3 for the 1937–38 season.

== League standings ==
=== Uppsvenska Östra 1937–38 ===
Pos	Team	Pld	W	D	L	GF	GA	GD	Pts	Qualification or relegation
1	Skärgårdens IF, Sandarne	16	13	1	2	48	16	+32	27	Promotion Playoffs
2	Iggesunds IK	16	10	2	4	45	23	+22	22	
3	Söderhamns IF	16	8	4	4	32	24	+8	20	
4	Strands IF, Hudiksvall	16	6	6	4	31	21	+10	18	
5	GIF Sundsvall	16	5	4	7	34	38	−4	14	
6	Ala IF	16	5	3	8	27	28	−1	13	
7	Kubikenborgs IF	16	4	5	7	23	37	−14	13	
8	Stugsunds IK	16	3	4	9	25	62	−37	10	Relegated
9	Edsbyns IF	16	3	1	12	19	45	−26	7	Relegated

=== Uppsvenska Västra 1937–38 ===
Pos	Team	Pld	W	D	L	GF	GA	GD	Pts	Promotion or relegation
1	Ludvika FFI	18	12	2	4	50	23	+27	26	Promotion Playoffs – Promoted
2	Örtakoloniens IF, Sandviken	18	10	3	5	44	23	+21	23	
3	Hofors AIF	18	8	7	3	40	28	+12	23	
4	Brynäs IF, Gävle	18	9	4	5	44	33	+11	22	
5	Fagersta AIK	18	9	3	6	42	37	+5	21	
6	Avesta IF	18	6	7	5	27	25	+2	19	
7	Sandvikens AIK	18	7	2	9	35	39	−4	16	
8	Avesta AIK	18	5	5	8	27	42	−15	15	
9	Leksands IF	18	5	2	11	31	45	−14	12	Relegated
10	Södra BK, Gävle	18	0	3	15	17	62	−45	3	Relegated

=== Östsvenska 1937–38 ===
Pos	Team	Pld	W	D	L	GF	GA	GD	Pts	Promotion or relegation
1	Enköpings SK	18	13	3	2	59	28	+31	29	Promoted
2	Enskede IK	18	10	5	3	45	24	+21	25	
3	Lunda SK, Märsta	18	10	1	7	48	37	+11	21	
4	Enebybergs IF	18	9	2	7	50	40	+10	20	
5	Årsta SK, Stockholm	18	7	4	7	47	44	+3	18	
6	IF Vesta, Uppsala	18	8	1	9	44	44	0	17	
7	IK Sture, Stockholm	18	7	2	9	44	42	+2	16	
8	Karlbergs BK, Stockholm	18	6	3	9	46	50	−4	15	
9	Djursholms IS	18	6	3	9	35	50	−15	15	Relegated
10	IK Sirius, Uppsala	18	2	0	16	27	86	−59	4	Relegated

=== Centralserien Norra 1937–38 ===
Pos	Team	Pld	W	D	L	GF	GA	GD	Pts	Qualification or relegation
1	Örebro IK	18	14	2	2	59	18	+41	30	Promotion Playoffs
2	Laxå IF	18	10	5	3	42	22	+20	25	
3	IFK Kumla	18	9	4	5	46	26	+20	22	
4	Örebro SK	18	10	2	6	49	31	+18	22	
5	IFK Lindesberg	18	8	3	7	49	48	+1	19	
6	IFK Örebro	18	7	3	8	37	33	+4	17	
7	Kolsva IF	18	7	2	9	26	29	−3	16	
8	IK Svenske, Örebro	18	5	2	11	29	45	−16	12	
9	Frövi IK	18	6	0	12	21	58	−37	12	Relegated
10	Hällefors AIF	18	2	1	15	26	74	−48	5	Relegated

=== Centralserien Södra 1937–38 ===
Pos	Team	Pld	W	D	L	GF	GA	GD	Pts	Promotion or relegation
1	IF Rune, Kungsör	18	15	0	3	65	23	+42	30	Promotion Playoffs – Promoted
2	Katrineholms SK	18	14	1	3	84	21	+63	29	
3	IK City, Eskilstuna	18	10	6	2	46	19	+27	26	
4	Västerås IK	18	8	3	7	58	35	+23	19	
5	Ekensbergs AIK	18	7	2	9	30	44	−14	16	
6	Nyköpings BK	18	4	6	8	28	52	−24	14	
7	IFK Arboga	18	5	3	10	29	57	−28	13	
8	IF Verdandi, Eskilstuna	18	4	4	10	16	54	−38	12	
9	Tunafors SK, Eskilstuna	18	4	3	11	22	42	−20	11	Relegated
10	Hälleforsnäs IF	18	4	2	12	20	51	−31	10	Relegated

=== Nordvästra 1937–38 ===
Pos	Team	Pld	W	D	L	GF	GA	GD	Pts	Promotion or relegation
1	Deje IK	18	13	3	2	64	27	+37	29	Promoted
2	IFK Kristinehamn	18	12	1	5	46	19	+27	25	
3	IFK Bofors	18	9	5	4	42	30	+12	23	
4	IFK Åmål	18	9	4	5	45	30	+15	22	
5	IF Örnen, Kristinehamn	18	7	3	8	45	41	+4	17	
6	IFK Sunne	18	7	2	9	51	46	+5	16	
7	Arvika IS	18	6	2	10	34	49	−15	14	
8	Håfreströms IF	18	6	2	10	31	56	−25	14	
9	Mariehofs IF, Karlstad	18	4	5	9	28	40	−12	13	Relegated
10	Slottsbrons IF	18	3	1	14	25	73	−48	7	Relegated

=== Södra Mellansvenska 1937–38 ===
Pos	Team	Pld	W	D	L	GF	GA	GD	Pts	Promotion or relegation
1	Husqvarna IF	18	12	3	3	39	21	+18	27	Promoted
2	Finspångs AIK	18	11	3	4	59	38	+21	25	
3	Waggeryds IK	18	9	3	6	37	27	+10	21	
4	Åtvidabergs FF	18	7	7	4	34	30	+4	21	
5	Vetlanda FF	18	7	5	6	41	34	+7	19	
6	Boxholms IF	18	7	5	6	38	34	+4	19	
7	Norrahammars GIS	18	5	4	9	32	42	−10	14	
8	Skeninge IK, Skänninge	18	6	1	11	27	60	−33	13	
9	Jönköping Södra IF	18	5	2	11	30	34	−4	12	Relegated
10	IFK Västervik	18	2	5	11	34	51	−17	9	Relegated

=== Sydöstra 1937–38 ===
Pos	Team	Pld	W	D	L	GF	GA	GD	Pts	Promotion or relegation
1	Kalmar AIK	18	10	6	2	43	24	+19	26	Promoted
2	Lessebo GIF	18	10	4	4	56	39	+17	24	
3	Nybro IF	18	8	6	4	35	27	+8	22	
4	Emmaboda IS	18	8	4	6	49	45	+4	20	
5	Kalmar FF	18	9	2	7	43	44	−1	20	
6	IFK Karlshamn	18	7	5	6	37	44	−7	19	
7	Kallinge SK	18	7	1	10	39	42	−3	15	
8	Hovmantorps GIF	18	5	3	10	32	42	−10	13	
9	Växjö BK	18	4	4	10	36	44	−8	12	Relegated
10	IFK Ronneby	18	2	5	11	27	46	−19	9	Relegated

=== Västsvenska Norra 1937–38 ===
Pos	Team	Pld	W	D	L	GF	GA	GD	Pts	Qualification or relegation
1	Trollhättans IF	18	11	3	4	40	20	+20	25	Promotion Playoffs
2	Skara IF	18	12	0	6	46	30	+16	24	
3	Kinna IF	18	11	2	5	40	33	+7	24	
4	Vänersborgs IF	18	10	1	7	41	33	+8	21	
5	IFK Uddevalla	18	8	5	5	42	35	+7	21	
6	Munkedals IF	18	10	1	7	54	46	+8	21	
7	Kungshamns IF	18	8	1	9	45	44	+1	17	
8	IF Heimer, Lidköping	18	6	3	9	32	40	−8	15	
9	Fritsla IF	18	2	3	13	25	57	−32	7	Relegated
10	Lysekils FF	18	2	1	15	26	53	−27	5	Relegated

=== Västsvenska Södra 1937–38 ===
Pos	Team	Pld	W	D	L	GF	GA	GD	Pts	Promotion or relegation
1	Oskarströms IS	18	12	3	3	59	17	+42	27	Promotion Playoffs – Promoted
2	Falkenbergs FF	18	11	4	3	48	21	+27	26	
3	Göteborgs AIK	18	10	3	5	37	24	+13	23	
4	Hisingstads IS, Hisingen	18	10	1	7	37	34	+3	21	
5	Lundby IF, Göteborg	18	8	4	6	44	28	+16	20	
6	Skogens IF, Göteborg	18	9	1	8	25	33	−8	19	
7	Varbergs GIF	18	8	2	8	40	44	−4	18	
8	Krokslätts FF, Mölndal	18	6	1	11	20	38	−18	13	
9	Götaholms BK, Göteborg	18	3	1	14	21	52	−31	7	Relegated
10	Partille IF	18	2	2	14	21	61	−40	6	Relegated

=== Sydsvenska 1937–38 ===
Pos	Team	Pld	W	D	L	GF	GA	GD	Pts	Promotion or relegation
1	IFK Malmö	18	12	3	3	50	27	+23	27	Promoted
2	Klippans BoIF	18	12	2	4	47	17	+30	26	
3	Ängelholms IF	18	8	4	6	33	32	+1	20	
4	Hälsans BK, Hälsingborg	18	7	5	6	35	30	+5	19	
5	IFK Hässleholm	18	8	3	7	47	45	+2	19	
6	IFK Höganäs	18	6	5	7	32	40	−8	17	
7	Stattena IF, Hälsingborg	18	5	6	7	31	35	−4	16	
8	Ystads IF	18	7	1	10	37	44	−7	15	
9	Lunds GIF	18	4	3	11	35	55	−20	11	Relegated
10	Bromölla IF	18	4	2	12	24	46	−22	10	Relegated
