= 1941–42 Division 3 (Swedish football) =

Swedish League Division 3
- Season: 1941–42
- Champions: Iggesunds IK; Avesta AIK; Örtakoloniens IF; Hagalunds IS; Västerås IK; IF Verdandi; Storfors FF; IFK Åmål; IFK Uddevalla; Nyköpings AIK; Husqvarna IF; IFK Oskarshamn; Bromölla IF; IFK Trollhättan; Krokslätts FF; Varbergs BoIS; Klippans BoIF
- Promoted: 8 teams
- Relegated: 26 teams

Statistics of Swedish football Division 3 for the 1941–42 season.

== League standings ==
=== Uppsvenska Sydöstra 1941–42 ===
Pos	Team	Pld	W	D	L	GF	GA	GD	Pts	Qualification or relegation
1	Iggesunds IK	16	14	1	1	78	7	+71	29	Promotion Playoffs
2	Hudiksvalls IF	16	10	3	3	52	31	+21	23	
3	Söderhamns IF	16	9	2	5	47	19	+28	20	
4	Strands IF, Hudiksvall	16	7	3	6	44	42	+2	17	
5	Bollnäs GIF	16	6	4	6	26	29	−3	16	
6	Skärgårdens IF, Sandarne	16	5	3	8	39	42	−3	13	
7	Alfta GIF	16	6	1	9	32	42	−10	13	
8	Arbrå BK	16	5	1	10	36	53	−17	11	Relegated
9	Forsa IF	16	1	0	15	16	105	−89	2	Relegated

=== Uppsvenska Sydvästra 1941–42 ===
Pos	Team	Pld	W	D	L	GF	GA	GD	Pts	Promotion or relegation
1	Avesta AIK	16	14	2	0	56	17	+39	30	Promotion Playoffs – Promoted
2	IFK Grängesberg	16	11	0	5	55	28	+27	22	
3	Långshyttans AIK	16	10	2	4	36	13	+23	22	
4	IFK Hedemora	16	5	4	7	37	41	−4	14	
5	Fagersta AIK	16	5	4	7	29	35	−6	14	
6	Falu BS, Falun	16	4	3	9	20	34	−14	11	
7	IFK Mora	16	4	3	9	24	50	−26	11	
8	Avesta IF	16	2	6	8	24	38	−14	10	
9	Säters IF	16	5	0	11	21	46	−25	10	Relegated

=== Östsvenska Norra 1941–42 ===
Pos	Team	Pld	W	D	L	GF	GA	GD	Pts	Qualification or relegation
1	Örtakoloniens IF, Sandviken	18	13	3	2	58	15	+43	29	Promotion Playoffs
2	Forsbacka IK	18	11	4	3	44	26	+18	26	
3	Skutskärs IF	18	11	2	5	61	29	+32	24	
4	IK Huge, Gävle	18	9	4	5	35	36	−1	22	
5	Brynäs IF, Gävle	18	9	3	6	38	29	+9	21	
6	Söderfors GIF	18	6	5	7	35	44	−9	17	
7	Örbyhus IF	18	5	4	9	30	50	−20	14	
8	Norrsundets IF	18	3	5	10	36	58	−22	11	
9	IK Sport, Hofors	18	4	1	13	25	55	−30	9	Relegated
10	Högbo AIK	18	3	1	14	28	48	−20	7	Relegated

=== Östsvenska Södra 1941–42 ===
Pos	Team	Pld	W	D	L	GF	GA	GD	Pts	Promotion or relegation
1	Hagalunds IS, Solna	18	13	3	2	59	25	+34	29	Promotion Playoffs – Promoted
2	Enskede IK	18	13	3	2	57	23	+34	29	
3	Årsta SK, Stockholm	18	11	4	3	51	21	+30	26	
4	IK Tellus, Stockholm	18	8	3	7	51	31	+20	19	
5	Södertälje SK	18	8	2	8	40	39	+1	18	
6	Värtans IK, Stockholm	18	7	3	8	25	33	−8	17	
7	Nynäshamns IF	18	6	3	9	46	38	+8	15	
8	IF Olympia, Stockholm	18	5	2	11	21	45	−24	12	
9	IK Sture, Stockholm	18	4	4	10	26	51	−25	12	Relegated
10	Essinge IK	18	1	1	16	17	87	−70	3	Relegated

=== Centralserien Norra 1941–42 ===
Pos	Team	Pld	W	D	L	GF	GA	GD	Pts	Qualification or relegation
1	Västerås IK	16	12	2	2	40	19	+21	26	Promotion Playoffs
2	IF Vesta, Uppsala	16	10	4	2	49	25	+24	24	
3	Västerås SK	16	9	4	3	45	18	+27	22	
4	Enköpings SK	16	8	3	5	48	35	+13	19	
5	Kolsva IF	16	6	6	4	38	26	+12	18	
6	Köpings IS	16	4	5	7	26	37	−11	13	
7	Morgongåva SK	16	3	4	9	21	41	−20	10	
8	Skultuna IS	16	2	5	9	23	45	−22	9	Relegated
9	Wirsbo IF	16	0	3	13	22	66	−44	3	Relegated

=== Centralserien Södra 1941–42 ===
Pos	Team	Pld	W	D	L	GF	GA	GD	Pts	Promotion or relegation
1	IF Verdandi, Eskilstuna	16	14	2	0	66	21	+45	30	Promotion Playoffs – Promoted
2	IFK Kumla	16	8	3	5	39	24	+15	19	
3	IFK Nora	16	8	3	5	38	26	+12	19	
4	Örebro IK	16	7	3	6	36	33	+3	17	
5	IF Rune, Kungsör	16	7	2	7	43	36	+7	16	
6	Tunafors SK, Eskilstuna	16	4	5	7	33	31	+2	13	
7	IFK Hallsberg	16	5	3	8	31	48	−17	13	
8	Riddarhytte SK	16	3	3	10	29	66	−37	9	Relegated
9	Bångbro IK	16	3	2	11	20	50	−30	8	Relegated

=== Nordvästra Norra 1941–42 ===
Pos	Team	Pld	W	D	L	GF	GA	GD	Pts	Qualification or relegation
1	Storfors FF	16	10	6	0	47	23	+24	26	Promotion Playoffs
2	IK Viking, Hagfors	16	9	4	3	45	23	+22	22	
3	Arvika BK	16	7	4	5	33	23	+10	18	
4	IFK Bofors	16	7	3	6	46	46	0	17	
5	IF Örnen, Kristinehamn	16	7	1	8	43	43	0	15	
6	Forshaga IF	16	7	0	9	29	38	−9	14	
7	Hällefors AIF	16	3	6	7	43	49	−6	12	
8	Nykroppa AIK	16	4	2	10	29	46	−17	10	Relegated
9	Grums IK	16	4	2	10	26	50	−24	10	Relegated

=== Nordvästra Södra, Dalsland 1941–42 ===
Pos	Team	Pld	W	D	L	GF	GA	GD	Pts	Qualification or relegation
1	IFK Åmål	14	11	1	2	47	14	+33	23	Promotion Playoffs
2	Mustadfors IF	14	8	2	4	34	26	+8	18	
3	Stigens IF	14	8	0	6	38	29	+9	16	
4	Långeds IF	14	6	3	5	22	29	−7	15	
5	Fengersfors IK	14	6	1	7	37	29	+8	13	
6	IF Viken, Åmål	14	4	4	6	20	38	−18	12	
7	Ödeborgs IF	14	5	1	8	19	26	−7	11	
8	Håfreströms IF	14	1	2	11	19	45	−26	4	Relegated

=== Nordvästra Södra, Bohus 1941–42 ===
Pos	Team	Pld	W	D	L	GF	GA	GD	Pts	Promotion or relegation
1	IFK Uddevalla	14	9	3	2	42	17	+25	21	Promotion Playoffs – Promoted
2	Munkedals IF	14	8	4	2	37	24	+13	20	
3	Kungshamns IF	14	9	0	5	40	24	+16	18	
4	Lysekils FF	14	8	1	5	38	30	+8	17	
5	IK Svane	14	5	3	6	32	28	+4	13	
6	Uddevalla IS	14	4	5	5	28	31	−3	13	
7	Hunnebostrands GIF	14	2	4	8	24	48	−24	8	
8	Smögens IF	14	1	0	13	15	54	−39	2	Relegated

=== Mellansvenska Norra 1941–42 ===
Pos	Team	Pld	W	D	L	GF	GA	GD	Pts	Promotion or relegation
1	Nyköpings AIK	18	14	3	1	80	29	+51	31	Promotion Playoffs – Promoted
2	BK Derby, Linköping	18	10	4	4	48	25	+23	24	
3	Motala AIF	18	11	2	5	48	27	+21	24	
4	Skärblacka IF	18	8	4	6	47	37	+10	20	
5	Loddby IF	18	7	2	9	39	50	−11	16	
6	Karle IF	18	5	6	7	31	44	−13	16	
7	Katrineholms SK	18	6	3	9	35	40	−5	15	
8	Boxholms IF	18	4	5	9	41	59	−18	13	
9	Katrineholms AIK	18	5	2	11	27	42	−15	12	Relegated
10	Vingåkers IF	18	3	3	12	27	70	−43	9	Relegated

=== Mellansvenska Södra 1941–42 ===
Pos	Team	Pld	W	D	L	GF	GA	GD	Pts	Qualification or relegation
1	Husqvarna IF	16	12	3	1	63	25	+38	27	Promotion Playoffs
2	Jönköping Södra IF	16	8	4	4	52	28	+24	20	
3	IFK Värnamo	16	9	2	5	31	29	+2	20	
4	Nässjö IF	16	8	3	5	43	29	+14	19	
5	Huskvarna Södra IS	16	5	5	6	35	37	−2	15	
6	IK Tord, Jönköping	16	5	2	9	33	39	−6	12	
7	Ljungby IF	16	3	5	8	20	53	−33	11	
8	Lessebo GIF	16	3	4	9	30	46	−16	10	Relegated
9	Växjö BK	16	4	2	10	33	54	−21	10	Relegated

=== Sydöstra Norra 1941–42 ===
Pos	Team	Pld	W	D	L	GF	GA	GD	Pts	Qualification or relegation
1	IFK Oskarshamn	16	11	3	2	54	27	+27	25	Promotion Playoffs
2	Västerviks AIS	16	10	4	2	55	31	+24	24	
3	Blomstermåla IK	16	7	5	4	31	27	+4	19	
4	Målilla GIF	16	8	1	7	48	50	−2	17	
5	Hvetlanda GIF, Vetlanda	16	6	4	6	33	32	+1	16	
6	Kalmar FF	16	6	2	8	38	29	+9	14	
7	Klavreströms IF	16	5	4	7	32	40	−8	14	
8	IF Hebe, Silverdalen	16	5	0	11	36	49	−13	10	
9	Vetlanda FF	16	2	1	13	19	61	−42	5	Relegated

=== Sydöstra Södra 1941–42 ===
Pos	Team	Pld	W	D	L	GF	GA	GD	Pts	Promotion or relegation
1	Bromölla IF	18	11	5	2	65	22	+43	27	Promotion Playoffs – Promoted
2	IFK Karlshamn	18	10	6	2	48	20	+28	26	
3	Högadals IS	18	9	4	5	64	22	+42	22	
4	Sölvesborgs GIF	18	8	5	5	38	25	+13	21	
5	Karlskrona BK	18	8	3	7	36	36	0	19	
6	IFK Karlskrona	18	6	5	7	25	33	−8	17	
7	Ronneby BK	18	5	4	9	24	42	−18	14	
8	Kallinge SK	18	6	1	11	39	55	−16	13	
9	Gammalstorps GIF	18	5	1	12	23	60	−37	11	Relegated
10	Jämshögs IF	18	4	2	12	26	73	−47	10	Relegated

=== Västsvenska Norra 1941–42 ===
Pos	Team	Pld	W	D	L	GF	GA	GD	Pts	Promotion or relegation
1	IFK Trollhättan	14	10	2	2	37	12	+25	22	Promotion Playoffs – Promoted
2	Trollhättans IF	14	7	2	5	34	26	+8	16	
3	Kinna IF	14	7	2	5	23	24	−1	16	
4	IF Heimer, Lidköping	14	5	3	6	25	25	0	13	
5	Svaneholms IF	14	5	2	7	23	25	−2	12	
6	Vänersborgs IF	14	5	2	7	20	27	−7	12	
7	Alingsås IF	14	4	3	7	24	32	−8	11	
8	Norrbygärde IF	14	3	4	7	24	39	−15	10	

=== Västsvenska Södra 1941–42 ===
Pos	Team	Pld	W	D	L	GF	GA	GD	Pts	Qualification or relegation
1	Krokslätts FF, Mölndal	18	13	4	1	70	27	+43	30	Promotion Playoffs
2	Jonsereds IF	18	12	5	1	59	24	+35	29	
3	Majornas IK, Göteborg	18	13	1	4	58	25	+33	27	
4	IK Virgo, Göteborg	18	10	2	6	42	31	+11	22	
5	Hisingstads IS, Hisingen	18	6	4	8	39	35	+4	16	
6	Haga IF, Göteborg	18	4	7	7	25	32	−7	15	
7	Lindholmens BK, Göteborg	18	6	2	10	33	52	−19	14	
8	IF Warta, Göteborg	18	3	5	10	28	46	−18	11	
9	IK Kongahälla, Kungälv	18	3	5	10	26	53	−27	11	
10	Göteborgs AIK	18	1	3	14	20	75	−55	5	Relegated

=== Sydsvenska Norra 1941–42 ===
Pos	Team	Pld	W	D	L	GF	GA	GD	Pts	Promotion or relegation
1	Varbergs BoIS	16	9	6	1	41	19	+22	24	Promotion Playoffs – Promoted
2	Gislaveds IS	16	8	4	4	45	34	+11	20	
3	Anderstorps IF	16	8	3	5	66	39	+27	19	
4	Alets IK	16	7	2	7	44	29	+15	16	
5	Falkenbergs FF	16	6	4	6	35	35	0	16	
6	Varbergs GIF	16	5	6	5	28	43	−15	16	
7	Oskarströms IS	16	6	3	7	35	37	−2	15	
8	IF Leikin, Halmstad	16	4	2	10	20	43	−23	10	
9	Nyhems BK, Halmstad	16	3	2	11	24	59	−35	8	Relegated

=== Sydsvenska Södra 1941–42 ===
Pos	Team	Pld	W	D	L	GF	GA	GD	Pts	Qualification or relegation
1	Klippans BoIF	18	14	1	3	58	17	+41	29	Promotion Playoffs
2	Malmö BI	18	10	2	6	49	36	+13	22	
3	Eskilsminne IF, Hälsingborg	18	9	4	5	49	38	+11	22	
4	IFK Höganäs	18	6	5	7	38	32	+6	17	
5	IFK Hässleholm	18	8	1	9	29	41	−12	17	
6	Sofielunds IF, Malmö	18	6	5	7	38	51	−13	17	
7	Malmö SK	18	6	5	7	36	50	−14	17	
8	Bjuvs IF	18	7	2	9	31	36	−5	16	
9	BK Drott, Hälsingborg	18	5	5	8	40	39	+1	15	Relegated
10	Ängelholms IF	18	3	2	13	30	58	−28	8	Relegated
