= 1940–41 in Swedish football =

The 1940–41 season in Swedish football, starting August 1940 and ending July 1941:

== Honours ==
=== Official titles ===
Title	Team	Reason
1940–41 Swedish Champions	Helsingborgs IF	Winners of Allsvenskan

=== Competitions ===
Level	Competition	Team
1st level	Allsvenskan 1940–41	Helsingborgs IF
2nd level	Division 2 Norra 1940–41	Reymersholms IK
2nd level	Division 2 Östra 1940–41	IFK Eskilstuna
2nd level	Division 2 Västra 1940–41	GAIS
2nd level	Division 2 Södra 1940–41	Halmstads BK
Regional Championship	Norrländska Mästerskapet 1941	Bodens BK

== Promotions, relegations and qualifications ==
=== Promotions ===
Promoted from	Promoted to	Team	Reason
Division 2 Norra 1940–41	Allsvenskan 1941–42	Reymersholms IK	Winners of promotion play-off
Division 2 Västra 1940–41	Allsvenskan 1941–42	GAIS	Winners of promotion play-off
Division 3 1940–41	Division 2 Norra 1941–42	IFK Lidingö	Winners of promotion play-off
Division 3 1940–41	Division 2 Norra 1941–42	Ljusne AIK	Winners of promotion play-off
Division 3 1940–41	Division 2 Östra 1941–42	IK City	Winners of promotion play-off
Division 3 1940–41	Division 2 Västra 1941–42	Karlstads BIK	Winners of promotion play-off
Division 3 1940–41	Division 2 Västra 1941–42	Skogens IF	Winners of promotion play-off
Division 3 1940–41	Division 2 Västra 1941–42	Waggeryds IK	Winners of promotion play-off
Division 3 1940–41	Division 2 Södra 1941–42	Nybro IF	Winners of promotion play-off
Division 3 1940–41	Division 2 Södra 1941–42	IFK Trelleborg	Winners of promotion play-off

=== Relegations ===
Relegated from	Relegated to	Team	Reason
Allsvenskan 1940–41	Division 2 Norra 1941–42	IK Brage	11th team
Allsvenskan 1940–41	Division 2 Östra 1941–42	IK Sleipner	12th team
Division 2 Norra 1940–41	Division 3 1941–42	Värtans IK	9th team
Division 2 Norra 1940–41	Division 3 1941–42	Nynäshamns IF	10th team
Division 2 Östra 1940–41	Division 3 1941–42	Husqvarna IF	9th team
Division 2 Östra 1940–41	Division 3 1941–42	Örebro FF	10th team
Division 2 Västra 1940–41	Division 3 1941–42	Varbergs BoIS	9th team
Division 2 Västra 1940–41	Division 3 1941–42	Arvika BK	10th team
Division 2 Södra 1940–41	Division 3 1941–42	IFK Värnamo	9th team
Division 2 Södra 1940–41	Division 3 1941–42	Malmö BI	10th team

== Domestic results ==
=== Allsvenskan 1940–41 ===

	Team	Pld	W	D	L	GF		GA	GD	Pts
1	Helsingborgs IF	22	14	3	5	46	–	26	+20	31
2	Degerfors IF	22	12	5	5	47	–	28	+19	29
3	AIK	22	11	4	7	45	–	36	+9	26
4	IF Elfsborg	22	11	3	8	54	–	37	+17	25
5	Landskrona BoIS	22	8	9	5	36	–	36	0	25
6	IFK Göteborg	22	8	6	8	42	–	36	+6	22
7	IFK Norrköping	22	8	6	8	35	–	32	+3	22
8	Malmö FF	22	7	8	7	33	–	33	0	22
9	Gårda BK	22	7	4	11	31	–	42	-11	18
10	Sandvikens IF	22	6	6	10	30	–	42	-12	18
11	IK Brage	22	6	4	12	39	–	53	-14	16
12	IK Sleipner	22	3	4	15	28	–	65	-37	10

=== Allsvenskan promotion play-off 1940–41 ===
June 2, 1941

Reymersholms IK	3–0	IFK Eskilstuna

?, Stockholm
June 8, 1941

IFK Eskilstuna	4–2	Reymersholms IK

?, Eskilstuna
June 15, 1941

Reymersholms IK	3–1	IFK Eskilstuna

?, Solna

June 2, 1941

Halmstads BK	2–2	GAIS

?, Halmstad
June 8, 1941

GAIS	3–0	Halmstads BK

?, Gothenburg

=== Division 2 Norra 1940–41 ===

	Team	Pld	W	D	L	GF		GA	GD	Pts
1	Reymersholms IK	18	12	3	3	49	–	20	+29	27
2	Djurgårdens IF	18	12	3	3	38	–	20	+18	27
3	Sandvikens AIK	18	12	1	5	49	–	24	+25	25
4	Hammarby IF	18	9	3	6	41	–	30	+11	21
5	Sundbybergs IK	18	8	3	7	34	–	43	-9	19
6	Ludvika FfI	18	6	3	9	51	–	42	+9	15
7	Gefle IF	18	6	3	9	23	–	36	-13	15
8	Hofors AIF	18	5	3	10	23	–	44	-21	13
9	Värtans IK	18	4	4	10	24	–	33	-9	12
10	Nynäshamns IF	18	1	4	13	11	–	51	-40	6

=== Division 2 Östra 1940–41 ===
	Team	Pld	W	D	L	GF		GA	GD	Pts
1	IFK Eskilstuna	18	15	2	1	75	–	21	+54	32
2	Örebro SK	18	9	3	6	42	–	34	+8	21
3	Surahammars IF	18	9	2	7	33	–	25	+8	20
4	Hallstahammars SK	18	8	2	8	31	–	27	+4	18
5	Åtvidabergs FF	18	8	2	8	42	–	45	-3	18
6	Finspångs AIK	18	8	2	8	39	–	46	-7	18
7	IFK Västerås	18	6	5	7	26	–	38	-12	17
8	Mjölby AI	18	5	4	9	21	–	34	-13	14
9	Husqvarna IF	18	5	2	11	27	–	37	-10	12
10	Örebro FF	18	4	2	12	23	–	52	-29	10

=== Division 2 Västra 1940–41 ===
	Team	Pld	W	D	L	GF		GA	GD	Pts
1	GAIS	18	14	2	2	48	–	16	+32	30
2	Tidaholms GIF	18	10	4	4	57	–	32	+25	24
3	Örgryte IS	18	9	5	4	36	–	30	+6	23
4	Karlskoga IF	18	9	3	6	49	–	32	+17	21
5	Skara IF	18	9	2	7	44	–	38	+6	20
6	Lundby IF	18	8	1	9	36	–	45	-9	17
7	Deje IK	18	7	1	10	31	–	44	-13	15
8	Billingsfors IK	18	6	1	11	33	–	35	-2	13
9	Varbergs BoIS	18	3	3	12	28	–	52	-24	9
10	Arvika BK	18	3	2	13	26	–	64	-38	8

=== Division 2 Södra 1940–41 ===
	Team	Pld	W	D	L	GF		GA	GD	Pts
1	Halmstads BK	18	13	2	3	44	–	20	+24	28
2	IS Halmia	18	12	0	6	56	–	24	+32	24
3	Kalmar AIK	18	9	3	6	42	–	41	+1	21
4	Höganäs BK	18	9	2	7	40	–	38	+2	20
5	IFK Kristianstad	18	6	5	7	41	–	42	-1	17
6	IFK Malmö	18	6	4	8	36	–	34	+2	16
7	BK Landora	18	6	4	8	26	–	44	-18	16
8	Olofströms IF	18	6	3	9	34	–	40	-6	15
9	IFK Värnamo	18	5	2	11	24	–	40	-16	12
10	Malmö BI	18	3	5	10	22	–	42	-20	11

=== Division 2 promotion play-off 1940–41 ===
June 2, 1941

Avesta AIK	1–2	Ljusne AIK

?, ?
June 8, 1941

Ljusne AIK	3–1	Avesta AIK

?, ?

June 2, 1941

IFK Lidingö	3–0	Brynäs IF

?, ?
June 8, 1941

Brynäs IF	0–2	IFK Lidingö

?, ?

June 2, 1941

IK City	2–1	Västerås SK

?, ?
June 8, 1941

Västerås SK	1–2	IK City

?, ?

June 2, 1941

IFK Åmål	2–1	Karlstads BIK

?, ?
June 8, 1941

Karlstads BIK	1–0	IFK Åmål

?, ?
June 15, 1941

IFK Åmål	?–? 1–3 (aet)	Karlstads BIK

?, ?

June 2, 1941

Skogens IF	2–0	IF Heimer

?, ?
June 8, 1941

IF Heimer	2–3	Skogens IF

?, ?

June 2, 1941

IFK Trelleborg	4–1	Anderstorps IF

?, ?
June 8, 1941

Anderstorps IF	1–4	IFK Trelleborg

?, ?

June 2, 1941

Waggeryds IK	3–1	Skärblacka IF

?, ?
June 8, 1941

Skärblacka IF	2–1	Waggeryds IK

?, ?
June 15, 1941

Waggeryds IK	5–0	Skärblacka IF

?, ?

June 2, 1941

Karlskrona BK	2–3	Nybro IF

?, ?
June 8, 1941

Nybro IF	4–0	Karlskrona BK

?, ?

=== Norrländska Mästerskapet 1941 ===
Final

July 20, 1941

Bodens BK	6–0	IF Älgarna

Bandyvallen, Boden

== National team results ==
August 29, 1940
Friendly
№ 227

Finland	2–3	Sweden
Weckström 31' (p); Beijar 58'		Johansson 13', 34', 85'

Olympiastadion, Helsinki
Attendance: 15,578
Referee: Bauwens (Germany)

Sweden: Gustav Sjöberg - Harry Nilsson, Erik Källström - Gösta Dahl, Arvid Emanuelsson, Karl-Erik Grahn - Arne Nyberg, Gunnar Gren, Knut Johansson, Sven Jonasson, Hilding Gustafsson.

September 22, 1940
Friendly
№ 228

Sweden	5–0	Finland
Persson 28'; Johansson 58', 59', 74'; Gren 89'

Råsunda, Solna
Attendance: 22,089
Referee: Laursen (Denmark)

Sweden: Sven Bergquist - Harry Nilsson, Hilding Gustafsson - Erik Persson, Arvid Emanuelsson, Karl-Erik Grahn - Åke Andersson, Gunnar Gren, Knut Johansson, Sven Jonasson, Stig Nyström.

October 6, 1940
Friendly
№ 229

Sweden	1–1	Denmark
Emanuelsson 5'		Mathiesen 6'

Råsunda, Solna
Attendance: 34,415
Referee: Ahlfors (Finland)

Sweden: Sven Bergquist - Harry Nilsson, Hilding Gustafsson - Erik Persson, Arvid Emanuelsson, Karl-Erik Grahn - Arne Nyberg, Gunnar Gren, Knut Johansson, Sven Jonasson, Stig Nyström.

October 20, 1940
Friendly
№ 230

Denmark	3–3	Sweden
Hansen 21', 35', 37'		Jonasson 13'; Holmqvist 72', 86'

Idrætsparken, Copenhagen
Attendance: 40,600
Referee: Lundström (Finland)

Sweden: Sven Bergquist - Harry Nilsson, Hilding Gustafsson - Erik Persson, Arvid Emanuelsson, Karl-Erik Grahn - Arne Nyberg, Erik Holmqvist, Knut Johansson, Sven Jonasson, Sture Andersson-Dahlöf.

== National team players in season 1940/41 ==
name	pos.	caps	goals	club
Åke "Carnera" Andersson	FW	1	0	AIK
Sture Andersson-Dahlöf	FW	1	0	IF Elfsborg
Sven "Svenne Berka" Bergquist (Bergqvist)	GK	3	0	Hammarby IF
Gösta Dahl	MF	1	0	IF Elfsborg
Arvid "Emma" Emanuelsson	MF	4	1	IF Elfsborg
Karl-Erik Grahn	MF	4	0	IF Elfsborg
Gunnar "Il Professore" Gren	FW	3	1	Gårda BK
Hilding "Moggli" Gustafsson	DF	4	0	Reymersholms IK
Erik "Mulle" Holmqvist	FW	1	2	IFK Norrköping
Knut Johansson	FW	4	6	IF Elfsborg
Sven "Jonas" Jonasson	FW	4	1	IF Elfsborg
Erik "Järnbacken" Källström	DF	1	0	IF Elfsborg
Harry Nilsson	DF	4	0	Landskrona BoIS
Arne Nyberg	FW	3	0	IFK Göteborg
Stig Nyström	FW	2	0	IK Brage
Erik Persson	MF	3	1	Landskrona BoIS
Gustav "Gurra" Sjöberg	GK	1	0	AIK
