= Viktor Götesson =

Swedish footballer

Personal information
- Full name: Sven Viktor Götesson
- Date of birth: 14 July 1995 (age 31)
- Place of birth: Sweden
- Height: 1.81 m (5 ft 11 1/2 in)
- Position: Forward

Team information
- Current team: AFC Eskilstuna
- Number: 24

Youth career
- –2011: IFÖ Bromölla IF
- 2013–2014: Mjällby AIF

Senior career*
Years	Team	Apps	(Gls)
2011–2012	IFÖ Bromölla IF	23	(4)
2013–2014	Mjällby AIF	5	(0)
2015–2018	IF Elfsborg	3	(0)
2017	→ Falkenbergs FF (loan)	30	(10)
2018–2019	Degerfors IF	54	(4)
2020–	AFC Eskilstuna	59	(8)

International career
2014	Sweden U19	2	(0)
- * Club domestic league appearances and goals as of 2 June 2023

Viktor Götesson (born 14 July 1995) is a Swedish footballer who plays for AFC Eskilstuna as a forward.
