= Niklas Mattsson (footballer) =

Swedish footballer (born 1968)

Personal information
- Date of birth: 27 May 1968 (age 58)
- Position: Defender

Senior career*
Years	Team	Apps	(Gls)
1990–1992	IFK Trelleborg		
1993–1995	Trelleborgs FF		
- * Club domestic league appearances and goals

Niklas Mattsson (born 27 May 1968) is a Swedish retired football defender.
