= Ivar Eriksson =

Swedish footballer

Personal information
- Date of birth: 25 December 1909
- Place of birth: Sweden
- Date of death: 12 April 1997 (aged 87)
- Position: Defender

Senior career*
Years	Team	Apps	(Gls)
- Sandvikens IF

International career
- Sweden
- * Club domestic league appearances and goals

Ivar Eriksson (25 December 1909 – 12 April 1997) was a Swedish football defender who played for Sweden in the 1938 FIFA World Cup. He also played for Sandvikens IF.
