= Folke Lind =

Swedish footballer

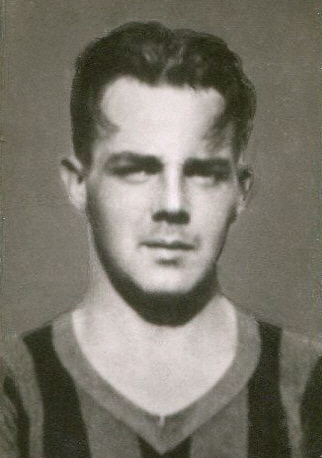

Personal information
- Full name: Folke Bertil Lind
- Date of birth: 4 April 1913
- Date of death: 6 February 2001 (aged 87)
- Position: Defender

Senior career*
Years	Team	Apps	(Gls)
1932–1948	GAIS	305	(8)

International career
1938	Sweden	1	(0)
- * Club domestic league appearances and goals

Folke Bertil Lind (4 April 1913 – 6 February 2001) was a Swedish footballer. He played 16 seasons for GAIS from 1932/33 to 1947/48. He scored the winning goal for GAIS in the 1942 Svenska Cupen final.

He was part of Sweden's squad at the 1936 Summer Olympics, but he did not play in any matches. Lind was in Sweden's squad for the 1938 World Cup as a reserve, so he did not play any matches in the tournament. His only international was a friendly against Latvia in 1938.
