= Fridolf Martinsson =

Swedish footballer

Personal information
- Full name: Fridolf Martinsson
- Position: Forward

Senior career*
Years	Team	Apps	(Gls)
1940–1942	Malmö FF	30	(15)
- * Club domestic league appearances and goals

Fridolf Martinsson was a Swedish footballer who played as a forward.
