= Georg Johansson (footballer) =

Swedish footballer (1910–1996)

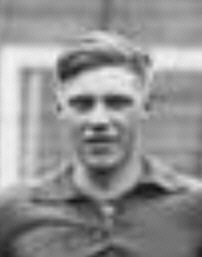

Personal information
- Date of birth: 23 April 1910
- Place of birth: Sweden
- Date of death: 12 January 1996 (aged 85)
- Position: Forward

Senior career*
Years	Team	Apps	(Gls)
- IK Brage

International career
- Sweden
- * Club domestic league appearances and goals

Georg Johansson (23 April 1910 – 12 January 1996) was a Swedish football forward who played for the Sweden national team. He was a reserve in the 1934 FIFA World Cup. He also played for IK Brage.
