= Gillis Andersson =

Swedish footballer

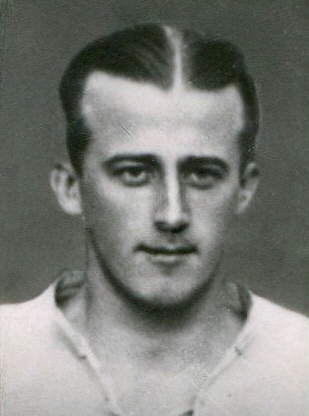
- Andersson in circa 1935

Personal information
- Date of birth: 4 July 1912
- Place of birth: Borås, Sweden
- Date of death: 13 July 1988 (aged 76)
- Position: Midfielder

International career
Years	Team	Apps	(Gls)
1938	Sweden	1	(0)

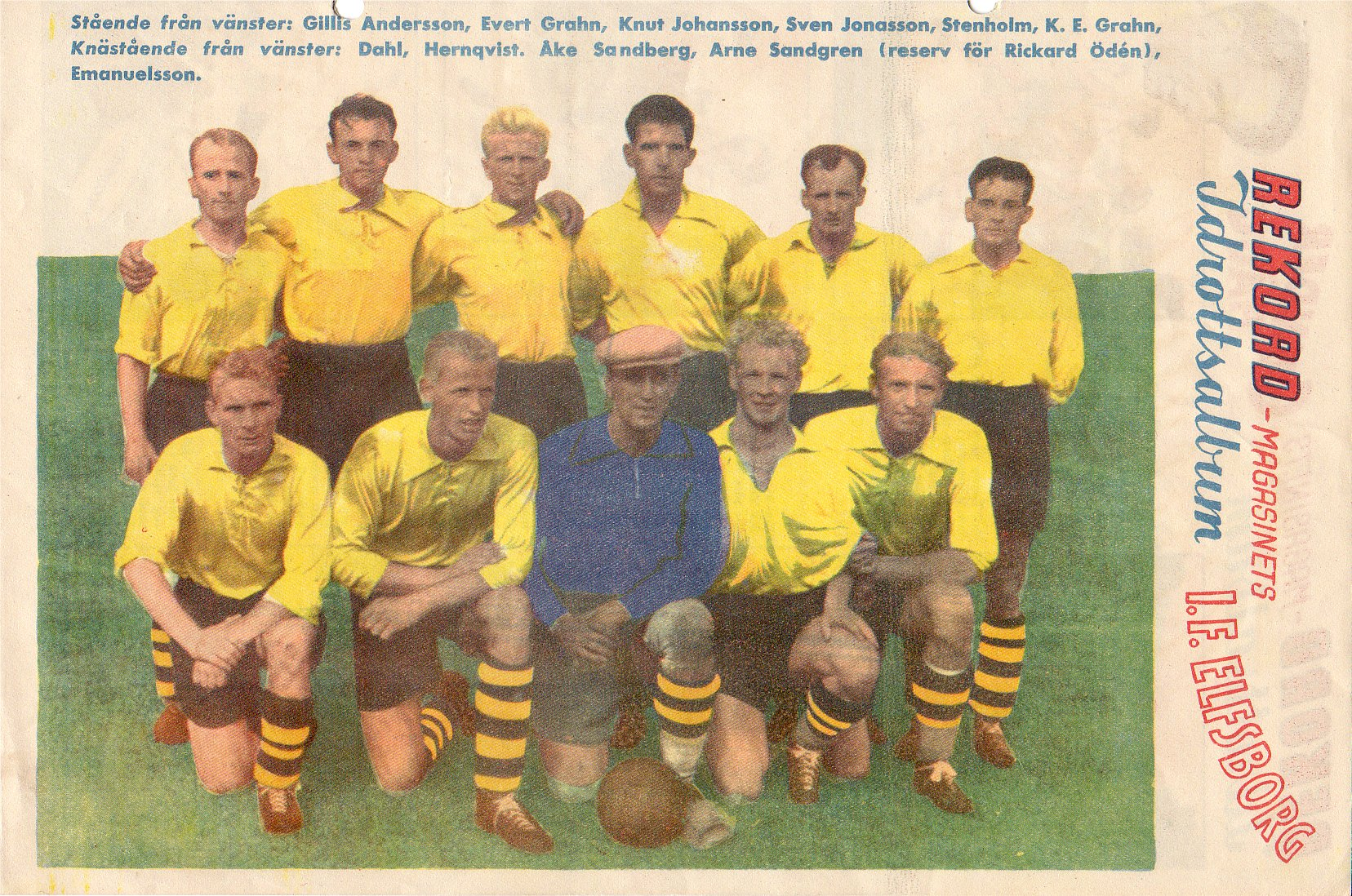
IF Elfsborg at 1942 with following players, from left standing: Gillis Andersson, Evert Grahn, Knut Johansson, Sven Jonasson, Axel Stenholm and K. E. Grahn; front row: Gösta Dahl, Ernst Hernqvist, Åke Sandberg (goalkeeper), Åke Sandgren and Arvid Emanuelsson.

Gillis Andersson (4 July 1912 – 13 July 1988) was a Swedish footballer who played as a midfielder. He made one appearance for the Sweden national team in 1938. He was also part of Sweden's squad for the football tournament at the 1936 Summer Olympics, but he did not play in any matches.

Andersson played for IF Elfsborg.
