= Arne Bryngelsson =

Swedish footballer (1915–1981)

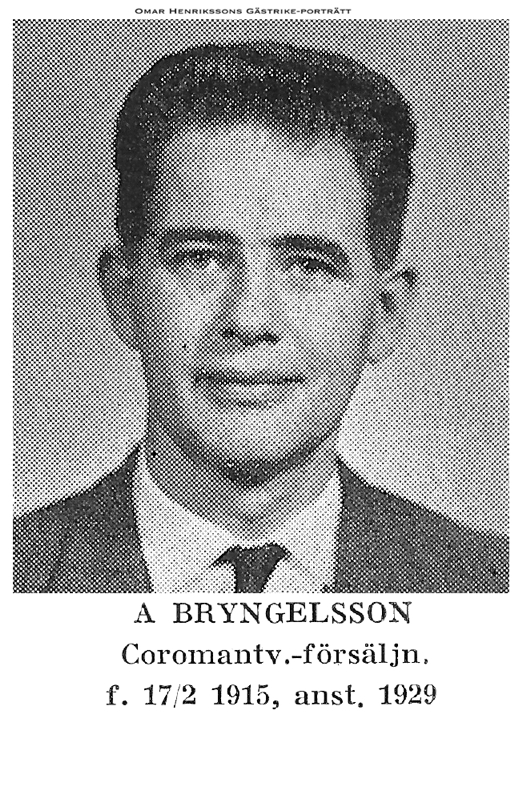

Personal information
- Date of birth: 17 February 1915
- Date of death: 18 February 1981 (aged 66)
- Position: Forward

Senior career*
Years	Team	Apps	(Gls)
–1933	Sandvikens IF		
1933–1935	Sandvikens AIK		
1935–1945	Sandvikens IF		
1945–1947	Djurgårdens IF	25	(6)

International career
1938	Sweden	2	(0)
- * Club domestic league appearances and goals

Arne Bryngelsson (17 February 1915 – 18 February 1981) was a Swedish footballer who played as a forward. He made two appearances for Sweden, 180 Allsvenskan appearances for Sandvikens IF and 25 Allsvenskan appearances for Djurgårdens IF.
