= Floyd Lagercrantz =

Swedish footballer (1915–1977)

Personal information
- Date of birth: 9 January 1915
- Place of birth: Västervik, Sweden
- Date of death: 4 October 1977 (aged 62)
- Place of death: Stockholm, Sweden
- Height: 1.89 m (6 ft 2 in)
- Position: Forward

Senior career*
Years	Team	Apps	(Gls)
- Kronobergs
- Enskede
1937–1939	AIK	33	(20)
- Enskede

International career
1938	Sweden	2	(3)
- * Club domestic league appearances and goals

Floyd Richard Lagercrantz, or Lagerkrantz, (9 January 1915 – 4 October 1977) was a Swedish footballer who most notably played as a forward for AIK. He was capped twice for the Sweden national team in 1938, scoring three goals.

== Career statistics ==
=== Club ===
Appearances and goals by club, season and competition
Club	Season	League			Svenska Cupen		Other		Total	
Club	Season	Division	Apps	Goals	Apps	Goals	Apps	Goals	Apps	Goals
AIK	1937–38	Allsvenskan	13	10	0	0	0	0	13	10
AIK	1938–39	Allsvenskan	20	10	0	0	0	0	20	10
Career total			33	20	0	0	0	0	33	20

=== International ===
Appearances and goals by national team and year
National team	Year	Apps	Goals
Sweden	1938	2	3
Total		2	3

Scores and results list Sweden's goal tally first, score column indicates score after each Lagercrantz goal.

List of international goals scored by Floyd Lagercrantz
No.	Date	Venue	Opponent	Score	Result	Competition
1	15 June 1938	Råsunda Stadium, Solna, Sweden	Finland	1–0	2–0	Friendly
2	4 July 1938	Helsinki Olympic Stadium, Helsinki, Finland	Finland	1–1	4–2	1937–47 Nordic Football Championship
3	4 July 1938	Helsinki Olympic Stadium, Helsinki, Finland	Finland	3–2	4–2	1937–47 Nordic Football Championship
