= Gunnar Bergström =

Swedish footballer

Personal information
- Date of birth: 7 May 1915
- Date of death: 18 March 1968 (aged 52)

International career
Years	Team	Apps	(Gls)
1937–1939	Sweden	10	(3)

Gunnar Bergström (7 May 1915 – 18 March 1968) was a Swedish footballer. He played in ten matches for the Sweden men's national football team from 1937 to 1939. He was also named in Sweden's squad for the Group 1 qualification tournament for the 1938 FIFA World Cup.
