= Knut Hansson =

Swedish footballer

Personal information
- Full name: Knut Ruben Börje Hansson
- Date of birth: 9 May 1911
- Place of birth: Sweden
- Date of death: 10 February 1990 (aged 78)
- Position: Forward

Senior career*
Years	Team	Apps	(Gls)
1931-1942	Landskrona BoIS	192	(154)

International career
1933–1938	Sweden	7	(6)
- * Club domestic league appearances and goals

Knut Ruben Börje Hansson (9 May 1911 – 10 February 1990) was a Swedish football forward who played for Sweden in the 1938 FIFA World Cup. He also played for Landskrona BoIS.
