= Arne Linderholm =

Swedish footballer

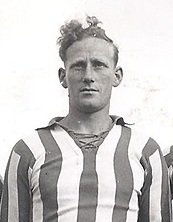

Personal information
- Date of birth: 22 February 1916
- Place of birth: Sweden
- Date of death: 20 November 1986 (aged 70)
- Position: Midfielder

Senior career*
Years	Team	Apps	(Gls)
- IK Sleipner

International career
	Sweden	5	(0)
- * Club domestic league appearances and goals

Arne Linderholm (22 February 1916 – 20 November 1986) was a Swedish football midfielder who played for Sweden in the 1938 FIFA World Cup. He also played for IK Sleipner.
