= Erik Almgren =

Swedish footballer (1908–1989)

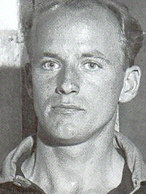

Personal information
- Full name: Karl Erik Algot Almgren
- Date of birth: 28 January 1908
- Place of birth: Stockholm, Sweden
- Date of death: 23 August 1989 (aged 81)
- Place of death: Stockholm, Sweden
- Position: Midfielder

Youth career
- –1933: Essinge IK

Senior career*
Years	Team	Apps	(Gls)
1934–1943	AIK	197	(4)

International career
1937–1938	Sweden	13	(0)

Managerial career
- 1943–1944: AIK
- 1945: IFK Helsingfors
- 1948: Åtvidabergs FF
- * Club domestic league appearances and goals

Karl Erik Algot Almgren (28 January 1908 – 23 August 1989) was a Swedish footballer and football manager. He played for AIK. He played 13 times for the Sweden national team, participating at the 1938 FIFA World Cup. He was on the Sweden squad at the 1936 Summer Olympics, having never played any matches.

He transitioned in his sporting career as a manager.
