= Henock Abrahamsson =

Swedish footballer

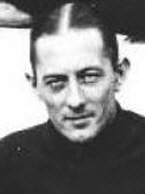

Personal information
- Date of birth: 29 October 1909
- Date of death: 23 April 1958 (aged 48)
- Position: Goalkeeper

Senior career*
Years	Team	Apps	(Gls)
- Gårda

International career
1938	Sweden	6	(0)
- * Club domestic league appearances and goals

Henock Abrahamsson (29 October 1909 – 23 April 1958) was a Swedish football goalkeeper who played for Gårda BK in the 1930s. He was capped in all of Sweden's three matches in the 1938 World Cup in France.
