= Olle Källgren =

Swedish footballer

Personal information
- Date of birth: 7 September 1907
- Place of birth: Sweden
- Date of death: 13 April 1983 (aged 75)
- Position: Defender

Senior career*
Years	Team	Apps	(Gls)
- Sandvikens IF

International career
- Sweden
- * Club domestic league appearances and goals

Olle Källgren (7 September 1907 – 13 April 1983) was a Swedish football defender who played for Sweden in the 1938 FIFA World Cup. He also played for Sandvikens IF.
