= Kurt Svanström =

Swedish footballer

Personal information
- Date of birth: 24 March 1915
- Place of birth: Sweden
- Date of death: 16 January 1996 (aged 80)
- Position: Midfielder

Senior career*
Years	Team	Apps	(Gls)
- Örgryte IS

International career
- Sweden
- * Club domestic league appearances and goals

Kurt Svanström (24 March 1915 – 16 January 1996) was a Swedish football midfielder who played for Sweden in the 1938 FIFA World Cup. He also played for Örgryte IS.
