= Sven Jacobsson =

Swedish footballer

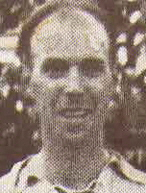
- Sven Jacobsson in the mid 1940s

Personal information
- Full name: Sven Lennart Jacobsson
- Date of birth: 17 April 1914
- Place of birth: Gothenburg, Sweden
- Date of death: 9 July 1983 (aged 69)
- Place of death: Gothenburg, Sweden
- Position: Midfielder

Senior career*
Years	Team	Apps	(Gls)
1934–1951	GAIS	280	(80)

International career
1937–1947	Sweden	7	(1)
- * Club domestic league appearances and goals

Sven Lennart Jacobsson (17 April 1914 – 9 July 1983) was a Swedish footballer who played as a midfielder for GAIS. He also represented Team Sweden in the 1938 FIFA World Cup in France.
