= Sven Jonasson =

Swedish footballer

- Sven Jonasson c. 1937.

Personal information
- Full name: Sven Jonasson
- Date of birth: July 9, 1909
- Place of birth: Borås, Sweden
- Date of death: September 17, 1984 (aged 75)
- Place of death: Varberg, Sweden
- Position: Forward

Senior career*
Years	Team	Apps	(Gls)
1927–1946	Elfsborg	409	(252)

International career
1932–1940	Sweden	42	(20)

Managerial career
- 1952–1954: Elfsborg
- * Club domestic league appearances and goals

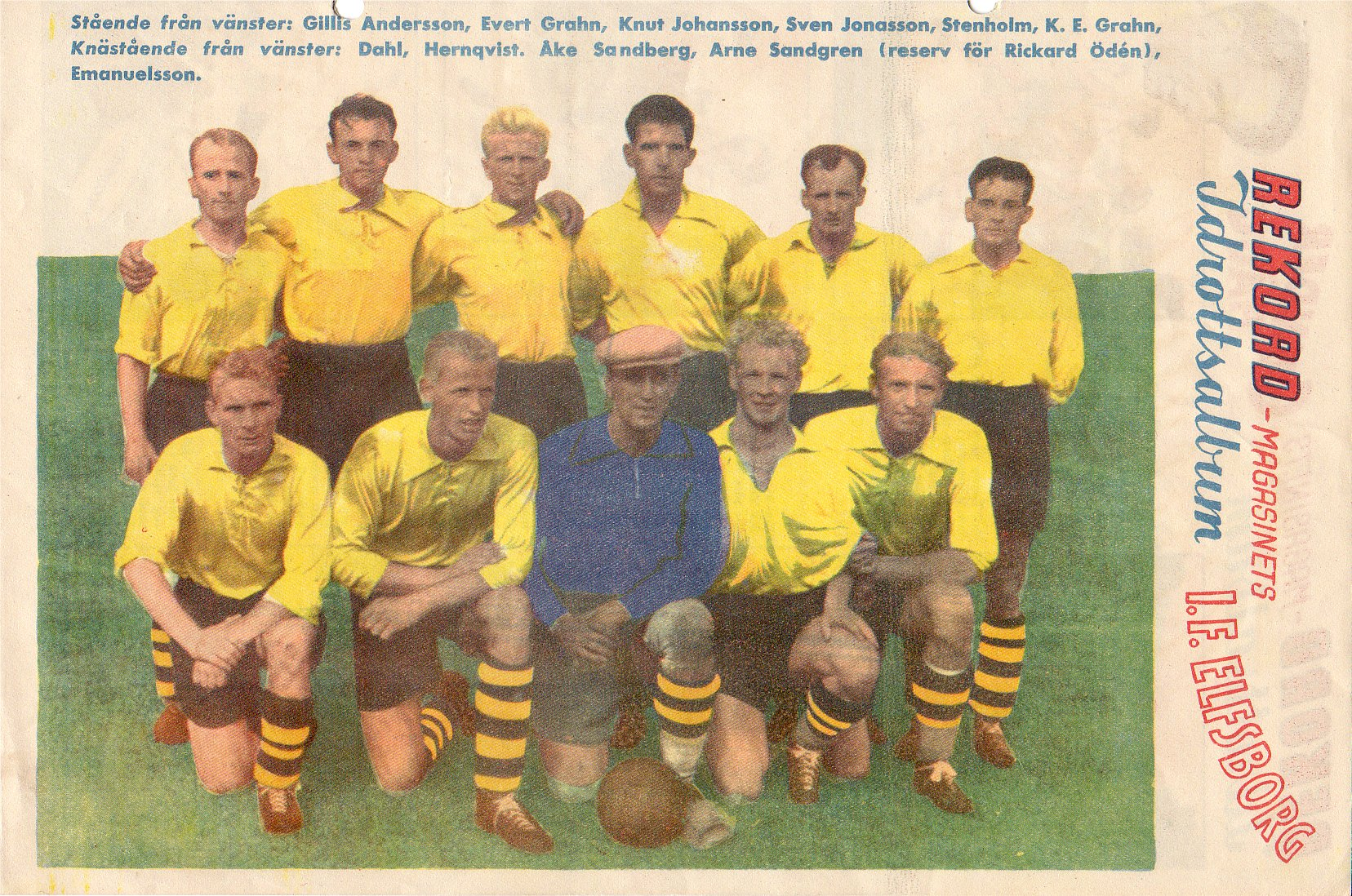
IF Elfsborg at 1942 with following players, from left standing: Gillis Andersson, Evert Grahn, Knut Johansson, Sven Jonasson, Axel Stenholm and K. E. Grahn; front row: Gösta Dahl, Ernst Hernqvist, Åke Sandberg (goalkeeper), Åke Sandgren and Arvid Emanuelsson.

Sven Jonasson (9 July 1909 – 17 September 1984) was a Swedish football striker and manager.

== Career ==
He played for Sweden at the 1936 Summer Olympics. He was born in Borås and died in Varberg.

He played for IF Elfsborg and the Sweden men's national football team, for whom he appeared in the 1934 and 1938 World Cups. He scored two goals in 1934 and one in 1938. Jonasson holds the record for most goals (252 goals) and most consecutive games (344 games, 1927–1941) in Allsvenskan (top level of Swedish football). In 1936 he is mentioned in a Danish source for playing as a "false 9" when playing against a team using a WM-formation. In the same article the Danish journalist compares Sven Jonasson to the English centreforward Ted Drake.

== Honours ==
Elfsborg

- Allsvenskan: 1935–36, 1938–39, 1939–40

Record

- All-time highest goalscorer of Allsvenskan: 254 goals
