= Arvid Emanuelsson =

Swedish footballer (1913–1980)

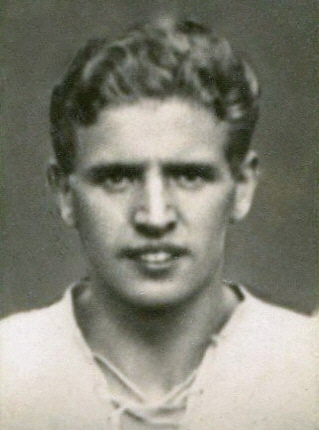

Personal information
- Date of birth: 25 December 1913
- Place of birth: Borås, Sweden
- Date of death: 19 March 1980 (aged 66)
- Place of death: Varberg, Sweden

International career
Years	Team	Apps	(Gls)
1935–1946	Sweden	35	(1)

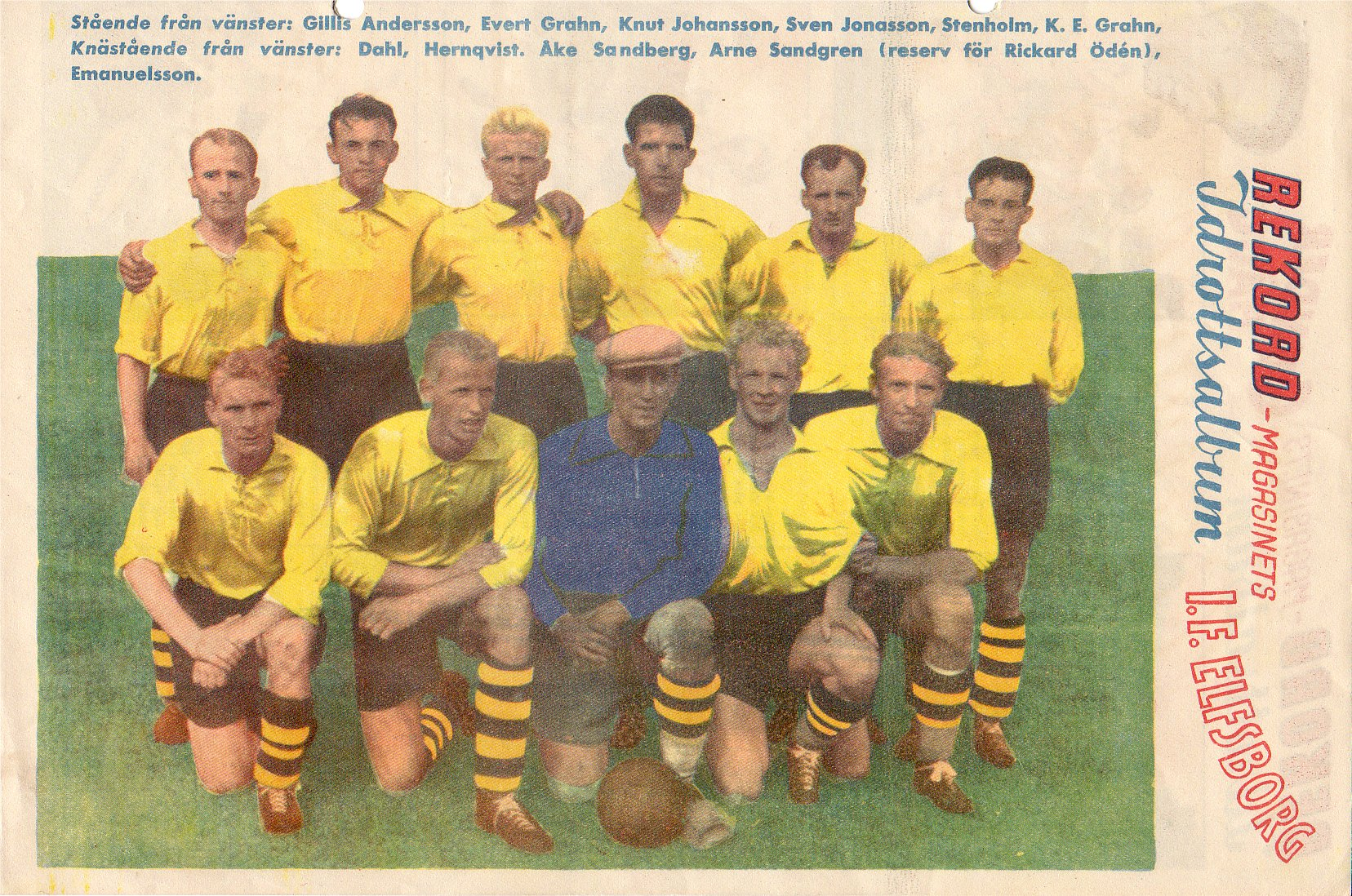
IF Elfsborg at 1942 with following players, from left standing: Gillis Andersson, Evert Grahn, Knut Johansson, Sven Jonasson, Axel Stenholm and K. E. Grahn; front row: Gösta Dahl, Ernst Hernqvist, Åke Sandberg (goalkeeper), Åke Sandgren and Arvid Emanuelsson.

Arvid Emanuelsson (25 December 1913 – 19 March 1980) was a Swedish footballer born in Borås who played as midfielder . He competed in the men's tournament at the 1936 Summer Olympics. He played in 35 games for the Sweden national team and scored one goal between 1935 and 1946.
