= Karl-Erik Grahn =

Swedish footballer (1914–1963)

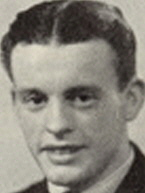

Personal information
- Full name: Karl-Erik Vilhelm Grahn
- Date of birth: 5 November 1914
- Place of birth: Jönköping, Sweden
- Date of death: 14 March 1963 (aged 48)
- Place of death: Borås, Sweden
- Positions: Midfielder; forward

Senior career*
Years	Team	Apps	(Gls)
1932–1949	IF Elfsborg	346	(57)

International career
1935–1946	Sweden	41	(3)
- * Club domestic league appearances and goals

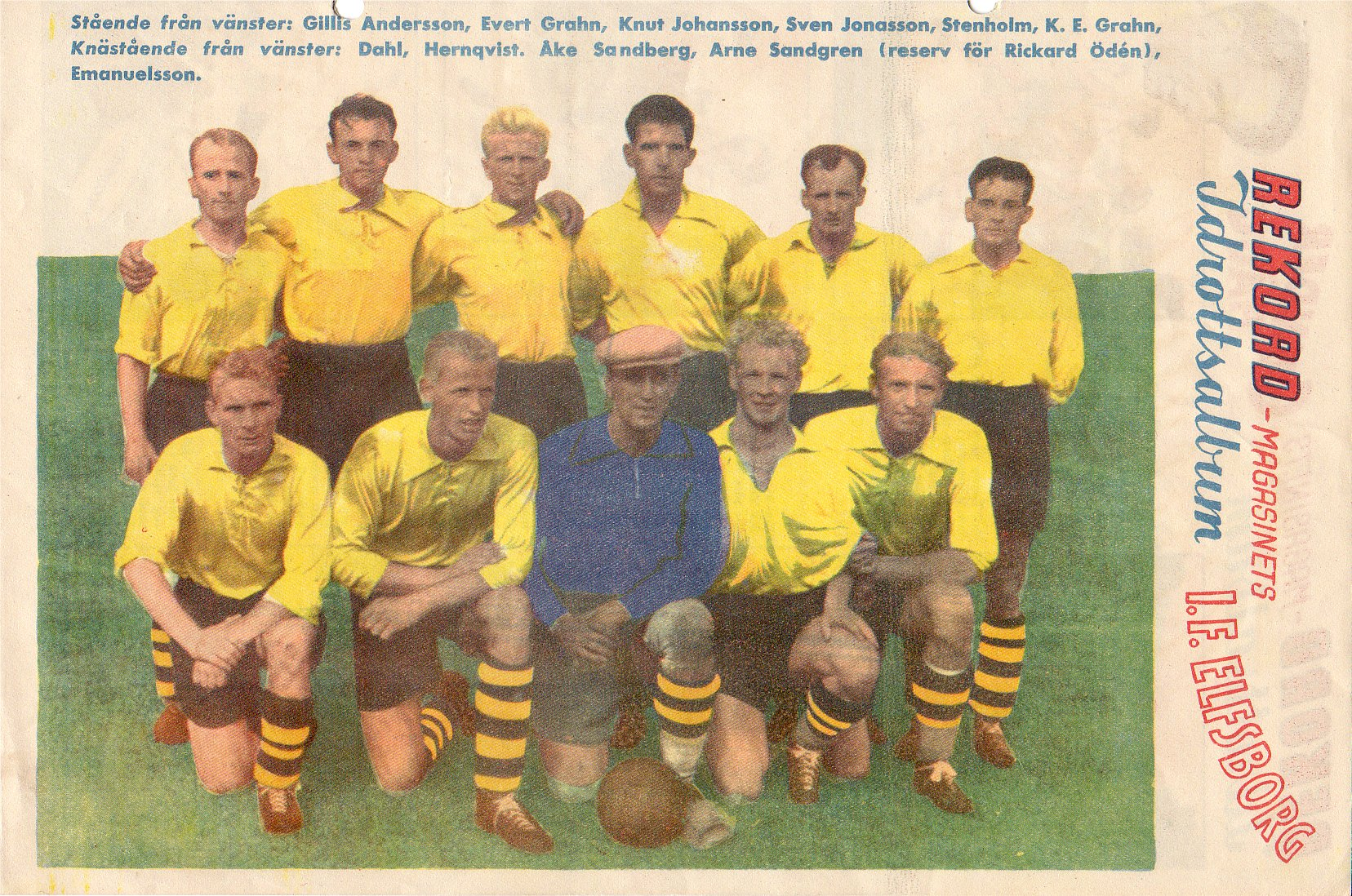
IF Elfsborg at 1942 with following players, from left standing: Gillis Andersson, Evert Grahn, Knut Johansson, Sven Jonasson, Axel Stenholm and K. E. Grahn; front row: Gösta Dahl, Ernst Hernqvist, Åke Sandberg (goalkeeper), Åke Sandgren and Arvid Emanuelsson.

Karl-Erik Grahn (5 November 1914 – 14 March 1963) was a Swedish footballer who played as a midfielder or forward for Sweden in the 1936 Olympic Games and the 1938 FIFA World Cup. He also played for IF Elfsborg.
