= Trollhättans IF =

Swedish sports club

- Full name: Trollhättans idrottsförening
- Sport: association football, track and field athletics, earlier also bandy, handball and ice hockey
- Founded: 1906
- Based in: Trollhättan, Sweden
- Ballpark: Knorretorpet (earlier Edsborgs IP)

Trollhättans IF
Home colours

Trollhättans IF or TIF, is a football club in Trollhättan, Sweden, which was founded in 1906. The association's first team were merged in 2001 with Trollhättan KC to FC Trollhättan. Trollhättan IF's first team played then in division 6 through the 2009 season, when the club won its series and moved up to Division 5, where they are currently playing.

== History ==
The club was founded in 1906. In the early decades, the club also had a bandy team, which managed to become district champions for Västergötland in 1930.

Trollhättan IF played in the Swedish second highest division, 1959–1960 and 1974–1976. The season 1975 was just over 10,500 spectators at the match against IFK Göteborg in Edsborgs IP.

In 2004 the club played qualifying games for the 2005 season Boys Allsvenskan. This team was a mixed team with players born 1989, 1990, and three players born 1991.

The women's soccer team has played 9 seasons in Swedish top division between 1981 and 1989, and lost the 1984 Swedish national against Jitex BK. That year Lena Videkull was the league's top scorer.

The track and field athlectics section is the organizer of one of the oldest Swedish road races, TIF Terrain. 2007 saw the 80th edition.

The club previously had a handball program and qualified for the Olympics in 1965, and also had a hockey team for a short time.
