= Ifö Bromölla IF =

Swedish football club

- Full name: Ifö Bromölla Idrottsförening
- Founded: 1927
- Ground: Strandängen; Bromölla; Sweden
- Chairman: Christer Adelsbo
- Head Coach: Anders Giselsson
- Coach: Hampus Lundquist, Ola Olausson
- League: Division 2 Östra Götaland
- 2019: Division 2 Östra Götaland, 12th (Relegation Playoffs)
Home colours

Ifö Bromölla IF is a Swedish football club located in Bromölla, a small industrial town in Skåne County with a strong football tradition.

== Background ==
Ifö Bromölla IF is a football club which was formed on 13 June 1927 in Bromölla by Robert Berner. In the beginning the club concentrated solely on football before widening its remit to include athletics, swimming, bandy, table tennis, badminton and gymnastics. In recent years several of these branches have formed their own separate clubs and in Ifö Bromölla IF there is now only football left.

In 1967, Bromölla IF changed its name to Ifö Bromölla IF, after Ifö-verken, which was the largest employer in the area.

Since their foundation Ifö Bromölla IF has participated mainly in the upper and middle divisions of the Swedish football league system. In 1942 the club was promoted to Division 2, then the second tier of Swedish football, where they stayed for a few seasons before being relegated back to Division 3. The club currently plays in Division 3 Södra Götaland which is the fifth tier of Swedish football. They play their home matches at the Strandängen in Bromölla.

Ifö Bromölla IF are affiliated to the Skånes Fotbollförbund.

== Recent history ==
In recent seasons Ifö Bromölla IF have competed in the following divisions:

2019 – Division 2 Östra Götaland
2018 – Division 2 Östra Götaland
2017 – Division 3 Sydöstra Götaland
2016 – Division 3 Södra Götaland
2015 – Division 3 Sydöstra Götaland
2014 – Division 3 Sydöstra Götaland
2013 – Division 3 Södra Götaland
2012 – Division 3 Sydöstra Götaland
2011 – Division 3 Södra Götaland
2010 – Division 3 Södra Götaland
2009 – Division 2 Södra Götaland
2008 – Division 3 Sydöstra Götaland
2007 – Division 3 Sydöstra Götaland
2006 – Division 4 Skåne Norra
2005 – Division 3 Sydvästra Götaland
2004 – Division 3 Sydvästra Götaland
2003 – Division 3 Sydöstra Götaland
2002 – Division 3 Sydöstra Götaland
2001 – Division 3 Sydöstra Götaland
2000 – Division 3 Sydöstra Götaland
1999 – Division 2 Södra Götaland

== Attendances ==
In recent seasons Ifö Bromölla IF have had the following average attendances:

Season	Average attendance	Division / Section	Level
2005	269	Div 3 Sydvästra Götaland	Tier 4
2006	Not available	Div 4 Skåne Norra	Tier 6
2007	314	Div 3 Sydöstra Götaland	Tier 5
2008	256	Div 3 Sydöstra Götaland	Tier 5
2009	252	Div 2 Södra Götaland	Tier 4
2010	170	Div 3 Södra Götaland	Tier 5
2011	190	Div 3 Södra Götaland	Tier 5
2012	194	Div 3 Sydöstra Götaland	Tier 5
2013	124	Div 3 Södra Götaland	Tier 5
2014	278	Div 3 Sydöstra Götaland	Tier 5
2015	286	Div 3 Sydöstra Götaland	Tier 5
2016	163	Div 3 Södra Götaland	Tier 5
2017	392	Div 3 Sydöstra Götaland	Tier 5
2018	?	Div 2 Östra Götaland	Tier 4
2019	?	Div 2 Östra Götaland	Tier 4

* Attendances are provided in the Publikliga sections of the Svenska Fotbollförbundet website.

== Current squad ==
As of 13 April 2014

Note: Flags indicate national team as defined under FIFA eligibility rules; some limited exceptions apply. Players may hold more than one non-FIFA nationality.

No.	Pos.	Nation	Player
1	GK	SWE	Ola Olausson
2	DF	SWE	Pierre Ohlsson
3	DF	SWE	Robin Friberg
4		SWE	Mattias Häggström
5		SWE	Andreas Johansson
6	DF	SWE	Fredrik Johansson
7	DF	SWE	Per Brynolfsson
8	MF	SWE	Robert Ancker Book
9	MF	SWE	Anders Giselsson
10	FW	SWE	Kim Thörnberg
11	FW	SWE	Mikael Nilsson
12	DF	SWE	Amar Kulic
14	DF	SWE	Marcus Borggren

No.	Pos.	Nation	Player
15	DF	SWE	Zehrudin Jusupovic
16	D F	SWE	André Zieme
17	FW	SWE	Adam Nilsson
18	MF	SWE	Måns Andersson
19	MF	SWE	Andreas Lindgren
20	FW	SWE	Niklas Tidblad
21	DF	SWE	Ismet Jusupovic
22	MF	SWE	Jimmy Rossander
30	GK	SWE	Pontus Kamph
33	DF	SWE	Hampus Lundquist
77	MF	SWE	Eric Ek
89	FW	SWE	Marcus Andersson
94	FW	SWE	Haris Jusupovic
