= Kalmar AIK Fotboll =

Swedish football club

Kalmar AIK Fotbollsklubb
- Full name: Kalmar Allmänna Idrottsförening Fotbollsklubb
- Founded: 1903; 123 years ago
- Ground: Fredriksskans, Kalmar
- Capacity: 9,000
- Chairman: John Brodin
- Manager: Mikael axelsson and Anton Skedebäck 2023–
- League: Division 5
- 2022: Division 4 Småland Östra, 10th (Relegation Playoffs - Relegated)
Home colours	Away colours

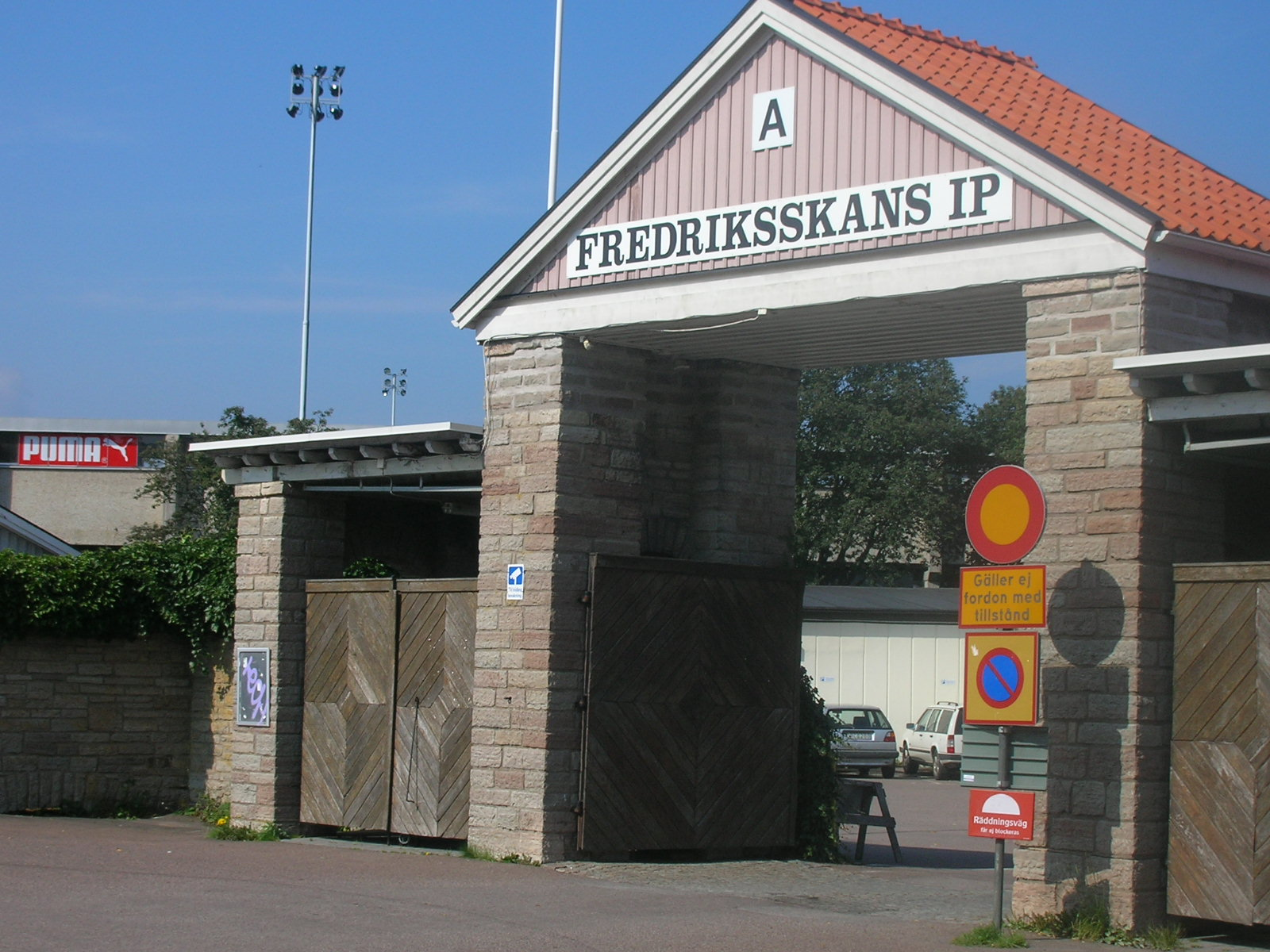
Fredriksskans

Kalmar Allmänna Idrottsklubb Fotbollsklubb (Kalmar Common Athletic Club Football Club) is a Swedish football club located in Kalmar. They play at Fredriksskans.

== History ==
1903: The sports association Glad Ungdom (Happy Youth) is formed November 22.
1905: Glad Ungdom's new name IK Örnen (IK Eagle) is presented.
1907: IK Falken (IK Falcon) is founded.
1909: IK Örnen is renamed Kalmar Idrottsklubb (Kalmar Athletic Club).
1917: IK Falken and Kalmar Idrottsklubb is merged into one club called Kalmar Allmänna Idrottsklubb, Kalmar AIK.
2000: Kalmar AIK is renaming all of their different sports, and the football club's new name is Kalmar Allmänna Idrottsklubb Fotbollsklubb, Kalmar AIK FK.

== Season to season ==
Season	Level	Division	Section	Position	Movements
2013	Tier 6	Division 4	Småland Södra	7th	
2014	Tier 6	Division 4	Småland Östra	1st	Promoted
2015	Tier 5	Division 3	Sydöstra Götaland	9th	Relegation Playoffs > Relegated
2016	Tier 6	Division 4	Småland Elit Östra	1st	Promoted
2017	Tier 5	Division 3	Sydöstra Götaland	12th	Relegated
2018	Tier 6	Division 4	Småland Östra	11th	Relegated
2019	Tier 7	Division 5	Småland Sydöstra	8th	
2020	Tier 7	Division 5	Småland Sydöstra	2nd	Promotion Playoff > Promoted
2021	Tier 6	Division 4	Småland Östra	10th	Relegation Playoff > Relegated

== Current squad (2013) ==
As of May 2013 Note: Flags indicate national team as defined under FIFA eligibility rules; some limited exceptions apply. Players may hold more than one non-FIFA nationality.

No.	Pos.	Nation	Player
1	GK	SWE	Tobias Tesell
2	DF	SWE	Johan Steglander
3	DF	SWE	Omar Eliassi
4	MF	SWE	Muharem Vuckic
5	DF	SWE	Anton Erlandsson
6	DF	SWE	Adam Krim
7	FW	SWE	Shaho Adbulahiayan
8	MF	SWE	Edin Skeja
9	FW	SWE	Albert Gegaj
10	MF	SWE	Karwan Delashob
12	MF	SWE	Antony Castro
13	DF	SWE	Kim Lindblad
14	MF	SWE	Azad Eliassi
15	DF	SWE	Carl Andreasson

No.	Pos.	Nation	Player
16	MF	SWE	Hampus Landegren
17	MF	SWE	Emil Engström
18	MF	SWE	Suliman Hassan
19	FW	SWE	Arnel Alijagic
20	MF	SWE	Masoud Rasuli
21	DF	SWE	Eliot Prvulovic
22	DF	SWE	Janne Poikela
23	MF	SWE	Kelly Kristensen
24	FW	SWE	Aziz Razoli
25	DF	SWE	Saman Eliassi
26	MF	SWE	Alexander Gummesson
27	DF	SWE	Sebastian Karlsson
28	DF	SWE	Reza Zade
29	FW	SWE	Kevin Kristensen
