= IF Rune =

Sports club in Kungsör, Sweden

- Full name: Idrottsföreningen Rune
- Sport: gymnastics, orienteering bandy, soccer (earlier)
- Founded: 28 April 1908
- Based in: Kungsör, Sweden

IF Rune is a sports club in Kungsör, Sweden, established on 28 April 1908. The club runs gymnastics and orienteering, earlier even bandy and soccer. The men's bandy team played in the Swedish top division in 1935. The men's soccer team played in the Swedish second division during the seasons of 1934–1935, 1936–1937 and 1937–1938.
