= IFK Åmål =

Swedish football club

- Full name: Idrottsföreningen Kamraterna Åmål
- Nickname: Comrades
- Founded: 1908
- Ground: Örnäsvallens IP; Åmål; Sweden
- Capacity: 1,000
- Chairman: Bernt Nilsson
- Coach: Leandro Teofilo Santos Pinto
- League: Division 2 Norra Götaland
- 2025: Division 4 Bohuslän-Dalsland, 10th
Home colours	Away colours

IFK Åmål is a Swedish football club located in Åmål in Västra Götaland County.

== Background ==
Idrottsföreningen Kamraterna Åmål is a sports club from Åmål that was founded in 1908. The club specialises in football and handball. At one time the club also participated in bandy and in 1959 played in Sweden's top division. The football club played in Sweden's second-highest division in the 1927/28 season.

Since their foundation IFK Åmål has participated mainly in the middle and lower divisions of the Swedish football league system. The club currently plays in Division 4 Bohuslän-Dalsland which is the sixth tier of Swedish football. They play their home matches at the Örnäsvallens IP in Åmål.

IFK Åmål are affiliated to Dalslands Fotbollförbund.

== Recent history ==
In recent seasons IFK Åmål have competed in the following divisions: 2018 - Division III, Västra Svealand
2017 - Division III, Västra Svealand
2016 - Division IV, Bohuslän/Dalsland
2015 - Division III, Nordvästra Götaland
2014 – Division II, Norra Götaland
2013 – Division II, Norra Götaland
2012 – Division III, Nordvästra Götaland
2011 – Division III, Nordvästra Götaland
2010 – Division IV, Bohuslän/Dal
2009 – Division IV, Bohuslän/Dal
2008 – Division III, Nordvästra Götaland
2007 – Division IV, Bohuslän/Dal
2006 – Division IV, Bohuslän/Dal
2005 – Division IV, Bohuslän/Dal
2004 – Division IV, Bohuslän/Dal
2003 – Division IV, Bohuslän/Dal
2002 – Division V, Dalsland
2000 – Division IV, Bohuslän/Dal
1999 – Division IV, Bohuslän/Dal

== Attendances ==
In recent seasons IFK Åmål have had the following average attendances:

Season	Average attendance	Division / Section	Level
2007	Not available	Div 4 Bohuslän/Dal	Tier 6
2008	254	Div 3 Nordvästra Götaland	Tier 5
2009	Not available	Div 4 Bohuslän/Dal	Tier 6
2010	84	Div 4 Bohuslän/Dal	Tier 6
2011	178	Div 3 Nordvästra Götaland	Tier 5
2012	217	Div 3 Nordvästra Götaland	Tier 5
2013	318	Div 2 Norra Götaland	Tier 4
2014	201	Div 2 Norra Götaland	Tier 4
2015	108	Div 3 Nordvästra Götaland	Tier 5
2016	135	Div 4 Bohuslän/Dalsland	Tier 6
2017	190	Div 3 Västra Svealand	Tier 5

* Attendances are provided in the Publikliga sections of the Svenska Fotbollförbundet website.
