= IFK Trelleborg =

Swedish football club

- Full name: Idrottsföreningen Kamraterna Trelleborg
- Founded: 1910; 115 years ago
- Ground: Vångavallen; Trelleborg; Sweden
- Capacity: 10,000
- Chairman: Bo-Lennart Nilsson
- Head coach: Jimmi Olsson
- Coach: Malik Sesay
- League: Division 3 Södra Götaland
- 2010: Division 3 Södra Götaland, 5th
Home colours	Away colours

IFK Trelleborg is a Swedish football club located in Trelleborg in Skåne County.

== Background ==
Idrottsföreningen Kamraterna Trelleborg was founded in 1910 and participates in the sport of handball as well as football.

Since their foundation IFK Trelleborg has participated mainly in the upper and middle divisions of the Swedish football league system. The club currently plays in Division 3 Södra Götaland which is the fifth tier of Swedish football. They play their home matches at the Vångavallen in Trelleborg.

IFK Trelleborg are affiliated to the Skånes Fotbollförbund. Local rivals FC Trelleborg play in the same division.

== Recent history ==
In recent seasons IFK Trelleborg have competed in the following divisions:

2010 - Division III, Södra Götaland
2009 - Division III, Södra Götaland
2008 - Division III, Södra Götaland
2007 - Division IV, Skåne Södra
2006 - Division IV, Skåne Södra
2005 - Division IV, Skåne Södra
2004 - Division IV, Skåne Södra
2003 - Division III, Södra Götaland
2002 - Division II, Södra Götaland
2001 - Division II, Södra Götaland
2000 - Division II, Södra Götaland
1999 - Division II, Södra Götaland
1998 - Division II, Södra Götaland
1997 - Division II, Södra Götaland
1996 - Division II, Södra Götaland
1995 - Division II, Södra Götaland
1994 - Division II, Södra Götaland
1993 - Division II, Södra Götaland

== Attendances ==
In recent seasons IFK Trelleborg have had the following average attendances:

Season	Average attendance	Division / Section	Level
2007	Not available	Div 4 Skåne Södr	Tier 6
2008	103	Div 3 Södra Götaland	Tier 5
2009	176	Div 3 Södra Götaland	Tier 5
2010	86	Div 3 Södra Götaland	Tier 5

* Attendances are provided in the Publikliga sections of the Svenska Fotbollförbundet website.
