= 1957–58 Division 2 (Swedish football) =

Swedish League Two Season

Swedish League Division 2
- Season: 1957–58
- Champions: Skellefteå AIK; Hammarby IF; Örgryte IS; Landskrona BoIS
- Promoted: Hammarby IF; Örgryte IS
- Relegated: Gefle IF; Bodens BK; Skellefteå IF; Vasalunds IF; IFK Bofors; Surahammars IF; Tranemo IF; Jonsereds IF; Tidaholms GIF; IF SAAB; IF Allians; Kalmar AIK

Statistics of Swedish football Division 2 for the 1957–58 season.

== League standings ==
=== Division 2 Norrland 1957–58 ===
Pos	Team	Pld	W	D	L	GF	GA	GD	Pts	Qualification or relegation
1	Skellefteå AIK	27	18	2	7	66	34	+32	38	Playoffs for promotion to Allsvenskan
2	IFK Holmsund	27	13	11	3	58	27	+31	37	
3	Marma IF	27	13	9	5	68	45	+23	35	
4	GIF Sundsvall	27	13	4	10	62	49	+13	30	
5	Lycksele IF	27	10	8	9	48	53	−5	28	
6	IFK Luleå	27	10	5	12	54	66	−12	25	
7	IFK Östersund	27	8	8	11	58	53	+5	24	
8	Gefle IF	27	10	3	14	53	67	−14	23	Relegated to Division 3
9	Bodens BK	27	5	5	17	51	80	−29	15	Relegated to Division 3
10	Skellefteå IF	27	4	7	16	36	80	−44	15	Relegated to Division 3

=== Division 2 Svealand 1957–58 ===
Pos	Team	Pld	W	D	L	GF	GA	GD	Pts	Qualification or relegation
1	Hammarby IF	33	25	5	3	117	32	+85	55	Playoffs for promotion to Allsvenskan
2	Degerfors IF	33	21	6	6	87	42	+45	48	
3	Örebro SK	33	22	3	8	91	41	+50	47	
4	IK Brage	33	20	1	12	70	67	+3	41	
5	Köpings IS	33	17	4	12	80	74	+6	38	
6	Västerås SK	33	12	7	14	71	64	+7	31	
7	IFK Stockholm	33	13	4	16	54	61	−7	30	
8	SK Sifhälla	33	11	6	16	45	54	−9	28	League transfer within league level
9	Hallstahammars SK	33	10	7	16	56	77	−21	27	
10	Vasalunds IF	33	9	5	19	54	82	−28	23	Relegated to Division 3
11	IFK Bofors	33	6	4	23	43	105	−62	16	Relegated to Division 3
12	Surahammars IF	33	3	6	24	27	96	−69	12	Relegated to Division 3

=== Division 2 Östra Götaland 1957–58 ===
Pos	Team	Pld	W	D	L	GF	GA	GD	Pts	Qualification or relegation
1	Landskrona BoIS	33	24	4	5	97	34	+63	52	Playoffs for promotion to Allsvenskan
2	Råå IF	33	19	9	5	71	38	+33	47	
3	IFK Kristianstad	33	17	5	11	84	63	+21	39	
4	BK Derby	33	15	5	13	74	57	+17	35	
5	IK Sleipner	33	13	9	11	69	54	+15	35	
6	Höganäs BK	33	14	6	13	58	63	−5	34	
7	Kalmar FF	33	14	4	15	66	66	0	32	
8	Katrineholms SK	33	13	6	14	45	51	−6	32	League transfer within league level
9	Åtvidabergs FF	33	12	6	15	56	73	−17	30	
10	IF Saab	33	11	7	15	58	82	−24	29	Relegated to Division 3
11	IF Allians	33	4	8	21	35	79	−44	16	Relegated to Division 3
12	Kalmar AIK	33	6	3	24	44	97	−53	15	Relegated to Division 3

=== Division 2 Västra Götaland 1957–58 ===
Pos	Team	Pld	W	D	L	GF	GA	GD	Pts	Qualification or relegation
1	Örgryte IS	33	25	5	3	118	42	+76	55	Playoffs for promotion to Allsvenskan
2	IF Elfsborg	33	22	6	5	78	34	+44	50	
3	Norrby IF	33	19	7	7	68	30	+38	45	
4	Jönköpings Södra IF	33	14	7	12	61	58	+3	35	
5	IK Oddevold	33	14	5	14	53	67	−14	33	
6	Kinna IF	33	12	7	14	44	53	−9	31	
7	Husqvarna IF	33	12	6	15	62	60	+2	30	
8	Waggeryds IK	33	11	6	16	61	71	−10	28	
9	IS Halmia	33	10	8	15	38	53	−15	28	
10	Tranemo IF	33	9	7	17	39	60	−21	25	Relegated to Division 3
11	Jonsereds IF	33	10	4	19	48	78	−30	24	Relegated to Division 3
12	Tidaholms GIF	33	3	6	24	31	95	−64	12	Relegated to Division 3

== Allsvenskan promotion playoffs ==
- Skellefteå AIK - Hammarby IF 2-6 (0-0, 2-6)
- Örgryte IS - Landskrona BoIS 6-0 (5-0, 1-0)

Hammarby IF and Örgryte IS promoted to Allsvenskan.
