= 1939–40 Division 2 (Swedish football) =

Swedish League Division 2
- Season: 1939–40
- Champions: Reymersholms IK; IFK Norrköping; Degerfors IF; IS Halmia
- Promoted: IFK Norrköping; Degerfors IF
- Relegated: Ljusne AIK; Enköpings SK; IK Tord; IFK Kumla; Jonsereds IF; IF Örnen; IFK Trelleborg; Ängelholms IF

Statistics of Swedish football Division 2 for the 1939–40 season.

== League standings ==
=== Division 2 Norra 1939–40 ===
Teams from a large part of northern Sweden, approximately above the province of Medelpad, were not allowed to play in the national league system until the 1953–54 season.

Pos	Team	Pld	W	D	L	GF	GA	GD	Pts	Qualification or relegation
1	Reymersholms IK	18	13	2	3	58	24	+34	28	Playoffs for promotion to Allsvenskan
2	Djurgårdens IF	18	10	6	2	39	17	+22	26	
3	Gefle IF	18	10	3	5	47	32	+15	23	
4	Värtans IK	18	9	3	6	33	25	+8	21 (Note: Tie breaker is goal average.)	
5	Ludvika FfI	18	8	5	5	40	33	+7	21	
6	Nynäshamns IF	18	7	3	8	34	43	−9	17	
7	Sandvikens AIK	18	7	0	11	30	40	−10	14	
8	IFK Västerås	18	4	5	9	25	41	−16	13	League transfer within league level
9	Ljusne AIK	18	4	3	11	25	39	−14	11	Relegated to Division 3
10	Enköpings SK	18	2	2	14	13	50	−37	6	Relegated to Division 3

=== Division 2 Östra 1939–40 ===
Pos	Team	Pld	W	D	L	GF	GA	GD	Pts	Qualification or relegation
1	IFK Norrköping	18	13	3	2	46	15	+31	29	Playoffs for promotion to Allsvenskan
2	Surahammars IF	18	10	6	2	42	16	+26	26	
3	IFK Eskilstuna	18	10	3	5	46	26	+20	23	
4	Mjölby AI	18	9	4	5	40	32	+8	22	
5	Hallstahammars SK	18	10	1	7	39	29	+10	21	
6	Skärblacka IF	18	6	3	9	32	38	−6	15 (Note: Tie breaker is goal average.)	Withdrew (Note: Skärblacka IF withdrew from Division 2 Östra to Division 3 after the season ended, and an extra team had to be promoted in their place. The losers of the qualification play-off, IF Rune, declined promotion and Örebro FF were promoted in their place.)
7	Husqvarna IF	18	6	3	9	25	40	−15	15	
8	Finspångs AIK	18	5	3	10	36	49	−13	13	
9	IK Tord	18	5	3	10	28	54	−26	13	Relegated to Division 3
10	IFK Kumla	18	0	3	15	19	54	−35	3	Relegated to Division 3

=== Division 2 Västra 1939–40 ===
Pos	Team	Pld	W	D	L	GF	GA	GD	Pts	Qualification or relegation
1	Degerfors IF	18	16	0	2	69	14	+55	32	Playoffs for promotion to Allsvenskan
2	Karlskoga IF	18	10	2	6	51	26	+25	22	
3	GAIS	18	9	3	6	48	31	+17	21 (Note: Tie breaker is goal average.)	
4	Skara IF	18	10	1	7	41	29	+12	21	
5	Varbergs BoIS	18	9	1	8	44	33	+11	19	
6	Tidaholms GIF	18	8	3	7	33	37	−4	19	
7	Deje IK	18	6	3	9	32	37	−5	15	
8	Billingsfors IK	18	7	1	10	28	39	−11	15	
9	Jonsereds IF	18	4	5	9	34	51	−17	13	Relegated to Division 3
10	IF Örnen	18	1	1	16	15	98	−83	3	Relegated to Division 3

=== Division 2 Södra 1939–40 ===
Pos	Team	Pld	W	D	L	GF	GA	GD	Pts	Qualification or relegation
1	IS Halmia	18	13	3	2	57	21	+36	29	Playoffs for promotion to Allsvenskan
2	Malmö BI	18	9	5	4	31	22	+9	23	
3	Halmstads BK	18	8	6	4	37	23	+14	22 (Note: Tie breaker is goal average.)	
4	IFK Värnamo	18	10	2	6	34	22	+12	22	
5	BK Landora	18	9	4	5	42	32	+10	22	
6	Olofströms IF	18	6	6	6	38	45	−7	18	
7	IFK Malmö	18	5	5	8	35	39	−4	15	
8	Höganäs BK	18	3	7	8	24	36	−12	13	
9	IFK Trelleborg	18	2	7	9	23	43	−20	11	Relegated to Division 3
10	Ängelholms IF	18	1	3	14	17	55	−38	5	Relegated to Division 3
