= 1944–45 Division 2 (Swedish football) =

Swedish League Division 2
- Season: 1944–45
- Champions: Djurgårdens IF; Åtvidabergs FF; Tidaholms GIF; Jönköpings Södra IF
- Promoted: Djurgårdens IF; Jönköpings Södra IF
- Relegated: Hallstahammars SK; Gefle IF; IF Verdandi; Nyköpings AIK; IFK Trollhättan; Skogens IF; Bromölla IF; Höganäs BK

Statistics of Swedish football Division 2 for the 1944–45 season.

== League standings ==
=== Division 2 Norra 1944–45 ===
Teams from a large part of northern Sweden, approximately above the province of Medelpad, were not allowed to play in the national league system until the 1953–54 season.

Pos	Team	Pld	W	D	L	GF	GA	GD	Pts	Qualification or relegation
1	Djurgårdens IF	18	13	1	4	51	20	+31	27	Playoffs for promotion to Allsvenskan
2	Surahammars IF	18	11	1	6	36	23	+13	23	
3	Reymersholms IK	18	9	3	6	39	33	+6	21	League transfer within league level
4	IK Brage	18	9	1	8	39	30	+9	19	
5	Sandvikens IF	18	7	3	8	31	32	−1	17	
6	Sandvikens AIK	18	6	5	7	23	30	−7	17	
7	Avesta AIK	18	7	2	9	34	38	−4	16	
8	Ljusne AIK	18	7	2	9	27	42	−15	16	
9	Hallstahammars SK	18	5	4	9	19	28	−9	14	Relegated to Division 3
10	Gefle IF	18	3	4	11	28	51	−23	10	Relegated to Division 3

=== Division 2 Östra 1944–45 ===
Pos	Team	Pld	W	D	L	GF	GA	GD	Pts	Qualification or relegation
1	Åtvidabergs FF	18	14	2	2	65	24	+41	30	Playoffs for promotion to Allsvenskan
2	Hammarby IF	18	13	2	3	63	25	+38	28	
3	IFK Västerås	18	9	3	6	46	33	+13	21	League transfer within league level
4	Sundbybergs IK	18	9	3	6	40	43	−3	21	
5	IK Sleipner	18	7	6	5	33	24	+9	20	
6	IFK Eskilstuna	18	6	5	7	36	38	−2	17	
7	Karlskoga IF	18	5	5	8	28	40	−12	15	
8	Örebro SK	18	4	6	8	28	43	−15	14	
9	IF Verdandi	18	3	4	11	21	52	−31	10	Relegated to Division 3
10	Nyköpings AIK	18	1	2	15	15	53	−38	4	Relegated to Division 3

=== Division 2 Västra 1944–45 ===
Pos	Team	Pld	W	D	L	GF	GA	GD	Pts	Qualification or relegation
1	Tidaholms GIF	18	14	2	2	62	25	+37	30	Playoffs for promotion to Allsvenskan
2	Örgryte IS	18	13	2	3	49	29	+20	28	
3	Karlstads BIK	18	9	5	4	33	21	+12	23	
4	IFK Tidaholm	18	8	3	7	36	33	+3	19	
5	Lundby IF	18	7	4	7	42	29	+13	18	
6	Gårda BK	18	7	4	7	43	44	−1	18	
7	Billingsfors IK	18	6	5	7	31	37	−6	17	
8	IFK Uddevalla	18	4	4	10	29	39	−10	12	
9	IFK Trollhättan	18	4	2	12	28	49	−21	10	Relegated to Division 3
10	Skogens IF	18	2	1	15	15	62	−47	5	Relegated to Division 3

=== Division 2 Södra 1944–45 ===
Pos	Team	Pld	W	D	L	GF	GA	GD	Pts	Qualification or relegation
1	Jönköpings Södra IF	18	18	0	0	92	25	+67	36	Playoffs for promotion to Allsvenskan
2	Limhamns IF	18	10	3	5	39	39	0	23	
3	Kalmar FF	18	9	2	7	31	31	0	20	
4	Nybro IF	18	9	1	8	49	46	+3	19	
5	IFK Malmö	18	8	1	9	47	47	0	17	
6	Blomstermåla IK	18	7	3	8	23	44	−21	17	
7	Husqvarna IF	18	5	5	8	42	48	−6	15	
8	Alets IK	18	5	3	10	24	38	−14	13	
9	Bromölla IF	18	4	4	10	39	51	−12	12	Relegated to Division 3
10	Höganäs BK	18	3	2	13	32	49	−17	8	Relegated to Division 3
