= 1940–41 Division 2 (Swedish football) =

Swedish League Division 2
- Season: 1940–41
- Champions: Reymersholms IK; IFK Eskilstuna; GAIS; Halmstads BK
- Promoted: Reymersholms IK; GAIS
- Relegated: Värtans IK; Nynäshamns IF; Husqvarna IF; Örebro FF; Varbergs BoIS; Arvika BK; IFK Värnamo; Malmö BI

Statistics of Swedish football Division 2 for the 1940–41 season.

== League standings ==
=== Division 2 Norra 1940–41 ===
Teams from a large part of northern Sweden, approximately above the province of Medelpad, were not allowed to play in the national league system until the 1953–54 season, and a championship was instead played to decide the best team in Norrland.

Pos	Team	Pld	W	D	L	GF	GA	GD	Pts	Qualification or relegation
1	Reymersholms IK	18	12	3	3	49	20	+29	27	Playoffs for promotion to Allsvenskan
2	Djurgårdens IF	18	12	3	3	38	20	+18	27	
3	Sandvikens AIK	18	12	1	5	49	24	+25	25	
4	Hammarby IF	18	9	3	6	41	30	+11	21	
5	Sundbybergs IK	18	8	3	7	34	43	−9	19	
6	Ludvika FfI	18	6	3	9	51	42	+9	15	
7	Gefle IF	18	6	3	9	23	36	−13	15	
8	Hofors AIF	18	5	3	10	23	44	−21	13	
9	Värtans IK	18	4	4	10	24	33	−9	12	Relegated to Division 3
10	Nynäshamns IF	18	1	4	13	11	51	−40	6	Relegated to Division 3

=== Division 2 Östra 1940–41 ===
Pos	Team	Pld	W	D	L	GF	GA	GD	Pts	Qualification or relegation
1	IFK Eskilstuna	18	15	2	1	75	21	+54	32	Playoffs for promotion to Allsvenskan
2	Örebro SK	18	9	3	6	42	34	+8	21	
3	Surahammars IF	18	9	2	7	33	25	+8	20	
4	Hallstahammars SK	18	8	2	8	31	27	+4	18	
5	Åtvidabergs FF	18	8	2	8	42	45	−3	18	
6	Finspångs AIK	18	8	2	8	39	46	−7	18	
7	IFK Västerås	18	6	5	7	26	38	−12	17	
8	Mjölby AI	18	5	4	9	21	34	−13	14	
9	Husqvarna IF	18	5	2	11	27	37	−10	12	Relegated to Division 3
10	Örebro FF	18	4	2	12	23	52	−29	10	Relegated to Division 3

=== Division 2 Västra 1940–41 ===
Pos	Team	Pld	W	D	L	GF	GA	GD	Pts	Qualification or relegation
1	GAIS	18	14	2	2	48	16	+32	30	Playoffs for promotion to Allsvenskan
2	Tidaholms GIF	18	10	4	4	57	32	+25	24	
3	Örgryte IS	18	9	5	4	36	30	+6	23	
4	Karlskoga IF	18	9	3	6	49	32	+17	21	
5	Skara IF	18	9	2	7	44	38	+6	20	
6	Lundby IF	18	8	1	9	36	45	−9	17	
7	Deje IK	18	7	1	10	31	44	−13	15	
8	Billingsfors IK	18	6	1	11	33	35	−2	13	
9	Varbergs BoIS	18	3	3	12	28	52	−24	9	Relegated to Division 3
10	Arvika BK	18	3	2	13	26	64	−38	8	Relegated to Division 3

=== Division 2 Södra 1940–41 ===
Pos	Team	Pld	W	D	L	GF	GA	GD	Pts	Qualification or relegation
1	Halmstads BK	18	13	2	3	44	20	+24	28	Playoffs for promotion to Allsvenskan
2	IS Halmia	18	12	0	6	56	24	+32	24	
3	Kalmar AIK	18	9	3	6	42	41	+1	21	
4	Höganäs BK	18	9	2	7	40	38	+2	20	
5	IFK Kristianstad	18	6	5	7	41	42	−1	17	
6	IFK Malmö	18	6	4	8	36	34	+2	16	
7	BK Landora	18	6	4	8	26	44	−18	16	
8	Olofströms IF	18	6	3	9	34	40	−6	15	
9	IFK Värnamo	18	5	2	11	24	40	−16	12	Relegated to Division 3
10	Malmö BI	18	3	5	10	22	42	−20	11	Relegated to Division 3
