= 1942–43 Division 2 (Swedish football) =

Swedish League Division 2
- Season: 1942–43
- Champions: IK Brage; Finspångs AIK; Örgryte IS; IS Halmia
- Promoted: IK Brage; IS Halmia
- Relegated: Hofors AIF; Sundbybergs IK; Surahammars IF; Avesta AIK; Deje IK; Waggeryds IK; IFK Trelleborg; Varbergs BoIS

Statistics of Swedish football Division 2 for the 1942–43 season.

== League standings ==
=== Division 2 Norra 1942–43 ===
Teams from a large part of northern Sweden, approximately above the province of Medelpad, were not allowed to play in the national league system until the 1953–54 season, and a championship was instead played to decide the best team in Norrland.

Pos	Team	Pld	W	D	L	GF	GA	GD	Pts	Qualification or relegation
1	IK Brage	18	12	4	2	42	19	+23	28	Playoffs for promotion to Allsvenskan
2	Sandvikens AIK	18	11	2	5	47	32	+15	24	
3	Ludvika FfI	18	10	3	5	47	40	+7	23	
4	Hammarby IF	18	8	3	7	58	37	+21	19	
5	Reymersholms IK	18	9	1	8	37	29	+8	19	
6	Djurgårdens IF	18	8	1	9	46	38	+8	17	
7	Hagalunds IS	18	6	5	7	34	48	−14	17	
8	Gefle IF	18	6	4	8	37	47	−10	16	
9	Hofors AIF	18	5	4	9	33	45	−12	14	Relegated to Division 3
10	Sundbybergs IK	18	0	3	15	14	60	−46	3	Relegated to Division 3

=== Division 2 Östra 1942–43 ===
Pos	Team	Pld	W	D	L	GF	GA	GD	Pts	Qualification or relegation
1	Finspångs AIK	18	8	7	3	44	29	+15	23	Playoffs for promotion to Allsvenskan
2	Åtvidabergs FF	18	8	6	4	46	29	+17	22	
3	Nyköpings AIK	18	10	1	7	42	47	−5	21	
4	Örebro SK	18	7	6	5	32	24	+8	20	
5	Hallstahammars SK	18	6	6	6	25	30	−5	18	League transfer within league level
6	IF Verdandi	18	6	5	7	28	32	−4	17 (Note: Tie breaker is (probably) head-to-head results.)	
7	IK Sleipner	18	7	3	8	28	32	−4	17	
8	IFK Västerås	18	5	6	7	28	32	−4	16	
9	Surahammars IF	18	3	8	7	24	24	0	14	Relegated to Division 3
10	Avesta AIK	18	4	4	10	27	45	−18	12	Relegated to Division 3

=== Division 2 Västra 1942–43 ===
Pos	Team	Pld	W	D	L	GF	GA	GD	Pts	Qualification or relegation
1	Örgryte IS	18	10	5	3	42	29	+13	25	Playoffs for promotion to Allsvenskan
2	Karlskoga IF	18	10	4	4	51	27	+24	24	League transfer within league level
3	IFK Trollhättan	18	10	3	5	37	23	+14	23	
4	Billingsfors IK	18	10	2	6	36	30	+6	22	
5	Skogens IF	18	9	0	9	50	44	+6	18	
6	IFK Uddevalla	18	8	2	8	45	47	−2	18	
7	Tidaholms GIF	18	8	2	8	38	41	−3	18	
8	Lundby IF	18	7	2	9	37	41	−4	16	
9	Deje IK	18	4	4	10	28	40	−12	12	Relegated to Division 3
10	Waggeryds IK	18	1	2	15	25	67	−42	4	Relegated to Division 3

=== Division 2 Södra 1942–43 ===
Pos	Team	Pld	W	D	L	GF	GA	GD	Pts	Qualification or relegation
1	IS Halmia	18	12	4	2	40	16	+24	28	Playoffs for promotion to Allsvenskan
2	Landskrona BoIS	18	11	2	5	52	22	+30	24	
3	Nybro IF	18	9	6	3	44	29	+15	24	
4	IFK Malmö	18	8	3	7	33	41	−8	19	
5	Bromölla IF	18	5	8	5	27	25	+2	18	
6	Höganäs BK	18	5	6	7	28	38	−10	16	
7	Olofströms IF	18	6	3	9	29	36	−7	15	
8	BK Landora	18	4	4	10	29	42	−13	12	
9	IFK Trelleborg	18	4	4	10	18	34	−16	12	Relegated to Division 3
10	Varbergs BoIS	18	4	4	10	15	32	−17	12	Relegated to Division 3
