= 1975 Division 2 (Swedish football) =

Swedish League Division 2
- Season: 1975
- Champions: IFK Sundsvall; Kalmar FF
- Promoted: IFK Sundsvall; Kalmar FF
- Relegated: IF Brommapojkarna; Falu BS; IFK Luleå; Västra Frölunda IF; Skövde AIK; Blomstermåla IK

Statistics of Swedish football division 2 in season 1975.

== League standings ==
=== Norra ===
Pos	Team	Pld	W	D	L	GF	GA	GD	Pts	Promotion or relegation
1	IFK Sundsvall	26	19	4	3	56	19	+37	42	Promotion to Allsvenskan
2	Brynäs IF	26	14	8	4	49	27	+22	36	
3	IFK Eskilstuna	26	14	4	8	54	45	+9	32	
4	IK Sirius	26	10	10	6	42	29	+13	30	
5	Sandvikens IF	26	10	9	7	33	24	+9	29	
6	Nyköpings BIS	26	14	0	12	48	38	+10	28	
7	IF Saab	26	10	6	10	39	35	+4	26	
8	IK Sleipner	26	8	9	9	40	37	+3	25	
9	Gefle IF	26	7	9	10	29	34	−5	23	
10	BK Derby	26	9	5	12	29	42	−13	23	
11	Ope IF	26	7	9	10	23	43	−20	23	
12	IF Brommapojkarna	26	8	5	13	32	37	−5	21	Relegation to Division 3
13	Falu BS	26	5	5	16	32	54	−22	15	Relegation to Division 3
14	IFK Luleå	26	1	9	16	32	74	−42	11	Relegation to Division 3

=== Södra ===
Pos	Team	Pld	W	D	L	GF	GA	GD	Pts	Promotion or relegation
1	Kalmar FF	26	21	2	3	48	15	+33	44	Promotion to Allsvenskan
2	IFK Göteborg	26	20	3	3	72	18	+54	43	
3	Helsingborgs IF	26	13	7	6	46	27	+19	33	
4	Jönköpings Södra IF	26	11	6	9	44	32	+12	28	
5	Emmaboda IS	26	10	6	10	33	44	−11	26	
6	IS Halmia	26	9	7	10	31	27	+4	25	
7	KB Karlskoga	26	9	7	10	33	37	−4	25	
8	IFK Hässleholm	26	10	4	12	31	35	−4	24	
9	Trollhättans IF	26	7	9	10	30	46	−16	23	
10	IFK Malmö	26	8	6	12	30	41	−11	22	
11	Grimsås IF	26	8	6	12	29	50	−21	22	
12	Västra Frölunda IF	26	7	7	12	27	32	−5	21	Relegation to Division 3
13	Skövde AIK	26	4	8	14	21	41	−20	16	Relegation to Division 3
14	Blomstermåla IK	26	4	4	18	26	56	−30	12	Relegation to Division 3
