= 1964 Division 2 (Swedish football) =

Swedish League Division 2
- Season: 1964
- Champions: GIF Sundsvall; Hammarby IF; Halmstads BK
- Promoted: Hammarby IF; GIF Sundsvall
- Relegated: Söderhamns IF; IFK Luleå; Västerås IK; IFK Sunne; Hallstahammars SK; Norrby IF; Malmö BI; Billingsfors IK; BK Derby; Husqvarna IF; Nyköpings AIK

Statistics of Swedish football Division 2 for the 1964 season.

== League standings ==
=== Norrland ===
Pos	Team	Pld	W	D	L	GF	GA	GD	Pts	Qualification or relegation
1	GIF Sundsvall	18	13	3	2	51	15	+36	29	Playoffs for promotion to Allsvenskan
2	IFK Holmsund	18	11	3	4	31	14	+17	25	
3	Skellefteå AIK	18	7	5	6	37	29	+8	19	
4	Gefle IF	18	7	5	6	34	26	+8	19	
5	Lycksele IF	18	7	5	6	37	34	+3	19	
6	IFK Östersund	18	6	6	6	25	27	−2	18	
7	Sandåkerns SK	18	7	3	8	39	42	−3	17	
8	Luleå SK	18	6	2	10	18	46	−28	14	
9	Söderhamns IF	18	4	5	9	15	24	−9	13	Relegation to Division 3
10	IFK Luleå	18	1	5	12	10	40	−30	7	Relegation to Division 3

=== Svealand ===
Pos	Team	Pld	W	D	L	GF	GA	GD	Pts	Qualification or relegation
1	Hammarby IF	22	17	3	2	80	14	+66	37	Playoffs for promotion to Allsvenskan
2	Sundbybergs IK	22	12	4	6	49	35	+14	28	
3	IK Brage	22	10	4	8	39	33	+6	24	
4	Råsunda IS	22	11	2	9	37	41	−4	24	
5	IFK Stockholm	22	10	3	9	48	30	+18	23	
6	Sandvikens IF	22	11	1	10	44	44	0	23	
7	SK Sifhälla	22	9	3	10	34	44	−10	21	
8	Sandvikens AIK	22	9	2	11	34	42	−8	20	
9	Karlstads BK	22	6	5	11	29	41	−12	17	
10	Västerås IK	22	8	0	14	29	53	−24	16	Relegation to Division 3
11	IFK Sunne	22	6	4	12	31	56	−25	16	Relegation to Division 3
12	Hallstahammars SK	22	6	3	13	35	56	−21	15	Relegation to Division 3

=== Västra Götaland ===
Pos	Team	Pld	W	D	L	GF	GA	GD	Pts	Qualification or relegation
1	Halmstad BK	22	14	5	3	52	21	+31	33	Playoffs for promotion to Allsvenskan
2	Gunnarstorps IF	22	12	6	4	46	25	+21	30	
3	Grimsås IF	22	11	5	6	42	33	+9	27	
4	Landskrona BoIS	22	8	9	5	46	35	+11	25	
5	IS Halmia	22	10	5	7	49	44	+5	25	
6	Gnosjö IF	22	8	5	9	46	53	−7	21	
7	IFK Malmö	22	7	6	9	36	30	+6	20	
8	Redbergslids IK	22	7	6	9	40	50	−10	20	
9	Varbergs BoIS	19	5	8	6	43	46	−3	18	
10	Norrby IF	23	6	8	9	32	45	−13	18 (Note: 2 points deducted?)	Relegation to Division 3
11	Malmö BI	22	5	6	11	21	48	−27	16	Relegation to Division 3
12	Billingsfors IK	22	4	3	15	31	54	−23	11	Relegation to Division 3

=== Östra Götaland ===
Pos	Team	Pld	W	D	L	GF	GA	GD	Pts	Qualification or relegation
1	Östers IF	22	15	6	1	59	29	+30	36	Playoffs for promotion to Allsvenskan
2	Åtvidabergs FF	22	12	5	5	50	25	+25	29	
3	IFK Kristianstad	22	10	6	6	37	34	+3	26	
4	Högadals IS	22	11	3	8	46	35	+11	25	
5	IFK Ystad	22	9	7	6	45	34	+11	25	
6	IF Saab	22	8	7	7	50	46	+4	23	
7	Kalmar FF	22	5	10	7	30	35	−5	20	
8	Bromölla IF	22	7	5	10	32	40	−8	19	
9	IFK Karlshamn	22	7	5	10	36	52	−16	19	
10	BK Derby	22	5	7	10	38	38	0	17	Relegation to Division 3
11	Husqvarna IF	22	5	4	13	35	55	−20	14	Relegation to Division 3
12	Nyköpings AIK	22	3	5	14	31	66	−35	11	Relegation to Division 3

== Allsvenskan promotion playoffs ==
Pos	Team	Pld	W	D	L	GF	GA	GD	Pts	Promotion
1	Hammarby IF	3	3	0	0	10	5	+5	6	Promotion to Allsvenskan
2	GIF Sundsvall	3	2	0	1	6	4	+2	4	Promotion to Allsvenskan
3	Östers IF	3	1	0	2	5	7	−2	2	
4	Halmstads BK	3	0	0	3	4	9	−5	0	
