= 1966 Division 2 (Swedish football) =

Swedish League Division 2
- Season: 1966
- Champions: IFK Holmsund; Hammarby IF; IF Saab; Gunnarstorps IF
- Promoted: Hammarby IF; IFK Holmsund
- Relegated: Lycksele IF; IFK Östersund; Gefle IF; Gimo IF; IFK Sunne; Tidaholms GIF; Varbergs BoIS; SK Sifhälla; Mönsterås GIF; Malmö BI; GIF Nike

Statistics of Swedish football Division 2 for the 1966 season.

== League standings ==
=== Norrland ===
Pos	Team	Pld	W	D	L	GF	GA	GD	Pts	Qualification or relegation
1	IFK Holmsund	18	13	3	2	49	16	+33	29	Playoffs for promotion to Allsvenskan
2	Sandvikens AIK	18	10	5	3	36	19	+17	25	
3	GIF Sundsvall	18	9	3	6	45	22	+23	21	
4	Brynäs IF	18	8	5	5	26	34	−8	21	
5	IFK Luleå	18	9	2	7	23	25	−2	20	
6	Sandåkerns SK	18	6	5	7	28	29	−1	17	
7	Luleå SK	18	5	6	7	21	23	−2	16	
8	Domsjö IF	18	5	3	10	26	30	−4	13	
9	Lycksele IF	18	4	3	11	11	41	−30	11	Relegation to Division 3
10	IFK Östersund	18	2	3	13	18	54	−36	7	Relegation to Division 3

=== Svealand ===
Pos	Team	Pld	W	D	L	GF	GA	GD	Pts	Qualification or relegation
1	Hammarby IF	22	16	4	2	53	21	+32	36	Playoffs for promotion to Allsvenskan
2	IFK Stockholm	22	14	3	5	61	33	+28	31	
3	IFK Eskilstuna	22	13	5	4	43	22	+21	31	
4	Sundbybergs IK	22	8	8	6	42	28	+14	24	
5	Västerås SK	22	9	4	9	58	44	+14	22	
6	Sandvikens IF	22	9	4	9	45	36	+9	22	
7	Södertälje SK	22	7	7	8	53	56	−3	21	
8	Karlstads BK	22	9	3	10	33	42	−9	21	
9	Avesta AIK	22	7	5	10	40	49	−9	19	
10	Gefle IF	22	7	4	11	31	37	−6	18	Relegation to Division 3
11	Gimo IF	22	4	7	11	28	54	−26	15	Relegation to Division 3
12	IFK Sunne	22	1	2	19	14	79	−65	4	Relegation to Division 3

=== Norra Götaland ===
Pos	Team	Pld	W	D	L	GF	GA	GD	Pts	Qualification or relegation
1	IF Saab	22	18	1	3	50	20	+30	37	Playoffs for promotion to Allsvenskan
2	Åtvidabergs FF	22	17	2	3	77	30	+47	36	
3	Jönköping Södra IF	22	12	5	5	46	31	+15	29	
4	Grimsås IF	22	11	4	7	41	30	+11	26	
5	Alingsås IF	22	9	6	7	45	48	−3	24	
6	Redbergslids IK	22	9	4	9	37	35	+2	22	
7	Skogens IF	22	8	5	9	34	26	+8	21	
8	Gnosjö IF	22	6	5	11	32	48	−16	17	
9	Finspångs AIK	22	7	3	12	35	59	−24	17	
10	Tidaholms GIF	22	6	4	12	36	50	−14	16	Relegation to Division 3
11	Varbergs BoIS	22	3	5	14	25	44	−19	11	Relegation to Division 3
12	SK Sifhälla	22	3	2	17	24	61	−37	8	Relegation to Division 3

=== Södra Götaland ===
Pos	Team	Pld	W	D	L	GF	GA	GD	Pts	Qualification or relegation
1	Gunnarstorps IF	22	16	4	2	64	24	+40	36	Playoffs for promotion to Allsvenskan
2	IFK Malmö	22	13	7	2	58	27	+31	33	
3	Landskrona BoIS	22	13	6	3	60	36	+24	32	
4	Östers IF	22	12	4	6	65	42	+23	28	
5	Bromölla IF	22	8	8	6	50	34	+16	24	
6	IS Halmia	22	9	4	9	52	39	+13	22	
7	Hässleholms IF	22	7	6	9	30	46	−16	20	
8	Kalmar FF	22	8	2	12	43	47	−4	18	
9	IFK Ystad	22	7	4	11	37	43	−6	18	
10	Mönsterås GIF	22	7	3	12	27	51	−24	17	Relegation to Division 3
11	Malmö BI	22	5	2	15	28	79	−51	12	Relegation to Division 3
12	GIF Nike	22	1	2	19	20	66	−46	4	Relegation to Division 3

== Allsvenskan promotion playoffs ==
Pos	Team	Pld	W	D	L	GF	GA	GD	Pts	Promotion
1	Hammarby IF	3	1	2	0	7	2	+5	4	Promotion to Allsvenskan
2	IFK Holmsund	3	1	2	0	3	1	+2	4	Promotion to Allsvenskan
3	Gunnarstorps IF	3	1	1	1	8	3	+5	3	
4	IF Saab	3	0	1	2	0	12	−12	1	
