= 1955–56 Division 2 (Swedish football) =

Swedish League Division 2
- Season: 1955–56
- Champions: Lycksele IF; IK Brage; IFK Malmö; GAIS
- Promoted: IFK Malmö; GAIS
- Relegated: IFK Östersund; Sandvikens AIK; Sollefteå GIF; SK Sifhälla; Karlskoga IF; IFK Trelleborg; Trelleborgs FF; BK Häcken

Statistics of Swedish football Division 2 for the 1955–56 season.

== League standings ==
=== Norrland ===
Pos	Team	Pld	W	D	L	GF	GA	GD	Pts	Qualification or relegation
1	Lycksele IF	18	9	6	3	35	17	+18	24	Playoffs for promotion to Allsvenskan
2	Fagerviks GF	18	9	6	3	38	27	+11	24	
3	Bodens BK	18	10	2	6	43	36	+7	22	
4	IFK Holmsund	18	8	5	5	37	31	+6	21	
5	Skellefteå AIK	18	8	3	7	38	29	+9	19	
6	GIF Sundsvall	18	8	2	8	31	33	−2	18	
7	Ljusne AIK	18	6	4	8	30	36	−6	16	
8	IFK Östersund	18	4	7	7	25	33	−8	15	Relegated to Division 3
9	Sandvikens AIK	18	5	2	11	26	32	−6	12	Relegated to Division 3
10	Sollefteå GIF	18	2	5	11	23	52	−29	9	Relegated to Division 3

=== Svealand ===
Pos	Team	Pld	W	D	L	GF	GA	GD	Pts	Qualification or relegation
1	IK Brage	18	10	5	3	45	30	+15	25	Playoffs for promotion to Allsvenskan
2	Örebro SK	18	9	3	6	22	20	+2	21	
3	IK City	18	8	4	6	34	34	0	20	
4	IFK Stockholm	18	8	3	7	29	25	+4	19	
5	IFK Eskilstuna	18	8	2	8	43	33	+10	18	
6	Karlstads BIK	18	6	5	7	31	29	+2	17	
7	Surahammars IF	18	6	4	8	38	44	−6	16	
8	Köpings IS	18	6	4	8	22	33	−11	16	
9	SK Sifhälla	18	6	3	9	31	40	−9	15	Relegated to Division 3
10	Karlskoga IF	18	4	5	9	27	34	−7	13	Relegated to Division 3

=== Östra Götaland ===
Pos	Team	Pld	W	D	L	GF	GA	GD	Pts	Qualification or relegation
1	IFK Malmö	18	13	2	3	42	17	+25	28	Playoffs for promotion to Allsvenskan
2	Kalmar FF	18	12	3	3	37	25	+12	27	
3	Motala AIF	18	9	4	5	37	19	+18	22	
4	BK Derby	18	7	5	6	32	29	+3	19	
5	IK Sleipner	18	7	3	8	30	32	−2	17	
6	Nybro IF	18	5	6	7	32	29	+3	16	
7	Landskrona BoIS	18	6	3	9	29	33	−4	15	
8	Åtvidabergs FF	18	5	4	9	26	39	−13	14	
9	IFK Trelleborg	18	5	3	10	21	41	−20	13	Relegated to Division 3
10	Trelleborgs FF	18	4	1	13	23	45	−22	9	Relegated to Division 3

=== Västra Götaland ===
Pos	Team	Pld	W	D	L	GF	GA	GD	Pts	Qualification or relegation
1	GAIS	18	15	0	3	48	18	+30	30	Playoffs for promotion to Allsvenskan
2	IF Elfsborg	18	14	1	3	60	23	+37	29	
3	Jönköpings Södra IF	18	11	2	5	46	27	+19	24	
4	Höganäs BK	18	10	3	5	51	41	+10	23	
5	Örgryte IS	18	9	2	7	46	44	+2	20	
6	Waggeryds IK	18	8	1	9	36	47	−11	17	
7	Husqvarna IF	18	3	6	9	27	39	−12	12	
8	Råå IF	18	3	5	10	27	41	−14	11	
9	Kinna IF	18	2	4	12	17	42	−25	8	
10	BK Häcken	18	1	4	13	17	53	−36	6	Relegated to Division 3

== Allsvenskan promotion playoffs ==
- IK Brage - IFK Malmö 2-3 (0-1, 2-2)
- Lycksele IF - GAIS 0-10 (0-2, 0-8)

IFK Malmö and GAIS promoted to Allsvenskan.
