= 1945–46 Division 2 (Swedish football) =

Swedish League Division 2
- Season: 1945–46
- Champions: Surahammars IF; Örebro SK; Billingsfors IK; Landskrona BoIS
- Promoted: Örebro SK; Billingsfors IK
- Relegated: Ljusne AIK; Långshyttans AIK; Sundbybergs IK; Hagalunds IS; IFK Tidaholm; Gårda BK; Limhamns IF; Blomstermåla IK

Statistics of Swedish football Division 2 for the 1945–46 season.

== League standings ==
=== Division 2 Norra 1945–46 ===
Teams from a large part of northern Sweden, approximately above the province of Medelpad, were not allowed to play in the national league system until the 1953–54 season.

Pos	Team	Pld	W	D	L	GF	GA	GD	Pts	Qualification or relegation
1	Surahammars IF	18	12	2	4	39	20	+19	26	Playoffs for promotion to Allsvenskan
2	Avesta AIK	18	11	3	4	39	25	+14	25	
3	IFK Västerås	18	9	5	4	39	24	+15	23	
4	IK Brage	18	10	1	7	39	26	+13	21	
5	Västerås IK	18	9	1	8	30	29	+1	19	
6	Ludvika FfI	18	7	4	7	41	34	+7	18	
7	Sandvikens IF	18	7	3	8	34	35	−1	17	
8	Sandvikens AIK	18	5	5	8	29	37	−8	15	
9	Ljusne AIK	18	3	2	13	26	49	−23	8	Relegated to Division 3
10	Långshyttans AIK	18	4	0	14	31	68	−37	8	Relegated to Division 3

=== Division 2 Östra 1945–46 ===
Pos	Team	Pld	W	D	L	GF	GA	GD	Pts	Qualification or relegation
1	Örebro SK	18	14	2	2	58	36	+22	30	Playoffs for promotion to Allsvenskan
2	Åtvidabergs FF	18	8	4	6	46	32	+14	20	
3	IK Sleipner	18	10	0	8	49	37	+12	20	
4	Hammarby IF	18	9	2	7	47	38	+9	20	
5	IFK Eskilstuna	18	9	1	8	27	20	+7	19	
6	Reymersholms IK	18	7	4	7	28	32	−4	18	
7	BK Derby	18	7	3	8	33	30	+3	17	
8	Karlskoga IF	18	6	2	10	27	37	−10	14	
9	Sundbybergs IK	18	6	1	11	25	49	−24	13	Relegated to Division 3
10	Hagalunds IS	18	3	3	12	23	52	−29	9	Relegated to Division 3

=== Division 2 Västra 1945–46 ===
Pos	Team	Pld	W	D	L	GF	GA	GD	Pts	Qualification or relegation
1	Billingsfors IK	18	12	4	2	46	27	+19	28	Playoffs for promotion to Allsvenskan
2	Tidaholms GIF	18	9	3	6	38	29	+9	21	
3	Lundby IF	18	7	7	4	34	29	+5	21	
4	Deje IK	18	8	4	6	29	28	+1	20	
5	IFK Uddevalla	18	7	6	5	25	34	−9	20	
6	Örgryte IS	18	6	5	7	40	28	+12	17	
7	Göteborgs FF	18	7	1	10	32	32	0	15	
8	Karlstads BIK	18	6	2	10	29	36	−7	14	
9	IFK Tidaholm	18	5	4	9	27	35	−8	14	Relegated to Division 3
10	Gårda BK	18	5	0	13	28	50	−22	10	Relegated to Division 3

=== Division 2 Södra 1945–46 ===
Pos	Team	Pld	W	D	L	GF	GA	GD	Pts	Qualification or relegation
1	Landskrona BoIS	18	13	3	2	53	20	+33	29	Playoffs for promotion to Allsvenskan
2	Husqvarna IF	18	12	3	3	51	29	+22	27	
3	IFK Malmö	18	10	3	5	48	30	+18	23	
4	Kalmar FF	18	9	3	6	42	27	+15	21	
5	Nybro IF	18	10	1	7	48	38	+10	21	
6	Kalmar AIK	18	7	2	9	38	46	−8	16	
7	Alets IK	18	5	4	9	29	39	−10	14	
8	Malmö BI	18	6	2	10	34	53	−19	14	
9	Limhamns IF	18	4	4	10	22	31	−9	12	Relegated to Division 3
10	Blomstermåla IK	18	1	1	16	15	67	−52	3	Relegated to Division 3
