= 1943–44 Division 2 (Swedish football) =

Swedish League Division 2
- Season: 1943–44
- Champions: Ludvika FFI; IFK Eskilstuna; Billingsfors IK; Landskrona BoIS
- Promoted: Ludvika FFI; Landskrona BoIS
- Relegated: Hagalunds IS; Örtakoloniens IF; Finspångs AIK; Västerås SK; Munkedals IF; Krokslätts FF; Olofströms IF; BK Landora

Statistics of Swedish football Division 2 for the 1943–44 season.

== League standings ==
=== Division 2 Norra 1943–44 ===
Teams from a large part of northern Sweden, approximately above the province of Medelpad, were not allowed to play in the national league system until the 1953–54 season, and a championship was instead played to decide the best team in Norrland.

Pos	Team	Pld	W	D	L	GF	GA	GD	Pts	Qualification or relegation
1	Ludvika FfI	18	12	3	3	46	27	+19	27	Playoffs for promotion to Allsvenskan
2	Hammarby IF	18	11	3	4	49	19	+30	25	League transfer within league level
3	Djurgårdens IF	18	10	3	5	50	23	+27	23	
4	Reymersholms IK	18	9	3	6	40	20	+20	21	
5	Ljusne AIK	18	9	1	8	50	38	+12	19	
6	Sandvikens AIK	18	8	3	7	37	42	−5	19	
7	Gefle IF	18	7	3	8	44	49	−5	17	
8	Hallstahammars SK	18	5	5	8	25	36	−11	15	
9	Hagalunds IS	18	3	6	9	27	52	−25	12	Relegated to Division 3
10	Örtakoloniens IF	18	0	2	16	17	79	−62	2	Relegated to Division 3

=== Division 2 Östra 1943–44 ===
Pos	Team	Pld	W	D	L	GF	GA	GD	Pts	Qualification or relegation
1	IFK Eskilstuna	18	12	2	4	44	24	+20	26	Playoffs for promotion to Allsvenskan
2	IK Sleipner	18	10	3	5	43	23	+20	23	
3	Karlskoga IF	18	10	3	5	48	33	+15	23	
4	IFK Västerås	18	10	1	7	46	34	+12	21	
5	Örebro SK	18	9	2	7	39	27	+12	20	
6	Åtvidabergs FF	18	9	2	7	50	45	+5	20	
7	IF Verdandi	18	8	1	9	38	36	+2	17	
8	Nyköpings AIK	18	4	4	10	25	43	−18	12	
9	Finspångs AIK	18	4	3	11	27	48	−21	11	Relegated to Division 3
10	Västerås SK	18	3	1	14	19	66	−47	7	Relegated to Division 3

=== Division 2 Västra 1943–44 ===
Pos	Team	Pld	W	D	L	GF	GA	GD	Pts	Qualification or relegation
1	Billingsfors IK	18	11	3	4	52	29	+23	25	Playoffs for promotion to Allsvenskan
2	Örgryte IS	18	10	3	5	39	31	+8	23	
3	Tidaholms GIF	18	8	4	6	43	34	+9	20	
4	IFK Uddevalla	18	9	1	8	52	40	+12	19 (Note: Tie breaker is (probably) most scored goals.)	
5	Gårda BK	18	8	3	7	44	36	+8	19	
6	IFK Trollhättan	18	6	7	5	34	39	−5	19	
7	Lundby IF	18	5	7	6	31	32	−1	17	
8	Skogens IF	18	6	4	8	32	38	−6	16	
9	Munkedals IF	18	5	2	11	33	56	−23	12	Relegated to Division 3
10	Krokslätts FF	18	3	4	11	31	56	−25	10	Relegated to Division 3

=== Division 2 Södra 1943–44 ===
Pos	Team	Pld	W	D	L	GF	GA	GD	Pts	Qualification or relegation
1	Landskrona BoIS	18	14	1	3	71	17	+54	29	Playoffs for promotion to Allsvenskan
2	Jönköpings Södra IF	18	13	1	4	73	33	+40	27	
3	Limhamns IF	18	8	5	5	35	32	+3	21	
4	Nybro IF	18	9	1	8	44	37	+7	19	
5	Höganäs BK	18	7	3	8	26	36	−10	17	
6	Bromölla IF	18	6	4	8	29	43	−14	16	
7	IFK Malmö	18	6	2	10	47	46	+1	14	
8	Kalmar FF	18	7	0	11	30	44	−14	14	
9	Olofströms IF	18	4	4	10	26	61	−35	12	Relegated to Division 3
10	BK Landora	18	5	1	12	24	56	−32	11	Relegated to Division 3
