= 1976 Division 2 (Swedish football) =

Swedish League Division 2
- Season: 1976
- Champions: BK Derby; IFK Göteborg
- Promoted: BK Derby; IFK Göteborg
- Relegated: Ope IF; Domsjö IF; Gefle IF; Motala AIF; Emmaboda IS; Trollhättans IF

Statistics of Swedish football division 2 in season 1976.

== League standings ==
=== Norra ===
Pos	Team	Pld	W	D	L	GF	GA	GD	Pts	Promotion or relegation
1	BK Derby	26	17	5	4	41	24	+17	39	Promotion to Allsvenskan
2	Sandvikens IF	26	15	8	3	41	17	+24	38	
3	Västerås SK	26	12	8	6	41	23	+18	32	
4	Nyköpings BIS	26	13	6	7	42	33	+9	32	
5	GIF Sundsvall	26	12	7	7	47	28	+19	31	
6	IK Sleipner	26	10	5	11	37	36	+1	25	
7	Brynäs IF	26	5	15	6	19	27	−8	25	
8	IFK Eskilstuna	26	9	6	11	44	30	+14	24	
9	Hudiksvalls ABK	26	8	8	10	44	38	+6	24	
10	IK Sirius	26	7	10	9	34	38	−4	24	
11	IF Saab	26	8	7	11	35	40	−5	23	
12	Ope IF	26	9	2	15	34	51	−17	20	Relegation to Division 3
13	Domsjö IF	26	6	6	14	25	50	−25	18	Relegation to Division 3
14	Gefle IF	26	3	3	20	25	74	−49	9	Relegation to Division 3

=== Södra ===
Pos	Team	Pld	W	D	L	GF	GA	GD	Pts	Promotion or relegation
1	IFK Göteborg	26	20	4	2	68	28	+40	44	Promotion to Allsvenskan
2	Helsingborgs IF	26	14	8	4	43	23	+20	36	
3	Jönköpings Södra IF	26	12	8	6	44	38	+6	32	
4	IFK Hässleholm	26	11	6	9	39	31	+8	28	
5	Norrby IF	26	9	9	8	35	30	+5	27	
6	GAIS	26	12	3	11	34	31	+3	27	
7	IFK Malmö	26	11	4	11	35	35	0	26	
8	IS Halmia	26	9	6	11	45	36	+9	24	
9	KB Karlskoga	26	11	2	13	22	43	−21	24	
10	Grimsås IF	26	8	7	11	46	43	+3	23	
11	Råå IF	26	7	7	12	28	35	−7	21	
12	Motala AIF	26	6	7	13	28	49	−21	19	Relegation to Division 3
13	Emmaboda IS	26	3	11	12	21	41	−20	17	Relegation to Division 3
14	Trollhättans IF	26	4	8	14	27	52	−25	16	Relegation to Division 3
