= 1974 Division 2 (Swedish football) =

Swedish League Division 2
- Season: 1974
- Champions: GIF Sundsvall; Örgryte IS
- Promoted: GIF Sundsvall; Örgryte IS
- Relegated: Degerfors IF; Älvsjö AIK; Skellefteå AIK; IFK Kristianstad; Hässleholms IF; IFK Falköping

These are the Swedish Division 2 standings for the 1974 season. The league was won by GIF Sundsvall, who were promoted to the Allsvenskan.

== League standings ==
=== Norra ===
Pos	Team	Pld	W	D	L	GF	GA	GD	Pts	Promotion or relegation
1	GIF Sundsvall	26	15	9	2	48	23	+25	39	Promotion to Allsvenskan
2	IF Saab	26	14	8	4	36	12	+24	36	
3	IFK Sundsvall	26	13	9	4	40	30	+10	35	
4	IK Sleipner	26	11	8	7	38	26	+12	30	
5	IF Brommapojkarna	26	11	7	8	47	40	+7	29	
6	Nyköpings BIS	26	10	9	7	36	29	+7	29	
7	KB Karlskoga	26	9	10	7	43	31	+12	28	
8	IFK Eskilstuna	26	8	11	7	48	43	+5	27	
9	Gefle IF	26	9	9	8	30	32	−2	27	
10	Sandvikens IF	26	8	7	11	27	38	−11	23	
11	Ope IF	26	6	8	12	23	51	−28	20	
12	Degerfors IF	26	4	8	14	32	38	−6	16	Relegation to Division 3
13	Älvsjö AIK	26	4	5	17	21	41	−20	13	Relegation to Division 3
14	Skellefteå AIK	26	2	8	16	21	56	−35	12	Relegation to Division 3

=== Södra ===
Pos	Team	Pld	W	D	L	GF	GA	GD	Pts	Promotion or relegation
1	Örgryte IS	26	16	7	3	61	26	+35	39	Promotion to Allsvenskan
2	Kalmar FF	26	18	2	6	49	27	+22	38	
3	Helsingborgs IF	26	12	10	4	45	26	+19	34	
4	IFK Malmö	26	12	7	7	45	39	+6	31	
5	IFK Göteborg	26	10	8	8	50	42	+8	28	
6	Grimsås IF	26	11	5	10	31	34	−3	27	
7	IS Halmia	26	7	12	7	27	34	−7	26	
8	Emmaboda IS	26	9	8	9	30	38	−8	26	
9	Skövde AIK	26	9	7	10	35	32	+3	25	
10	Västra Frölunda IF	26	9	7	10	27	28	−1	25	
11	Trollhättans IF	26	8	7	11	42	42	0	23	
12	IFK Kristianstad	26	6	8	12	40	50	−10	20	Relegation to Division 3
13	Hässleholms IF	26	6	5	15	33	55	−22	17	Relegation to Division 3
14	IFK Falköping	26	1	3	22	20	62	−42	5	Relegation to Division 3
