= 1959 Division 2 (Swedish football) =

Swedish League Division 2
- Season: 1959
- Champions: IFK Luleå; Degerfors IF; Jönköpings Södra IF; Landskrona BoIS
- Promoted: Jönköpings Södra IF; Degerfors IF
- Relegated: Fagerviks GF; GIF Sundsvall; Luleå SK; Hallstahammars SK; Katrineholms SK; Västerås SK; Varbergs BoIS; Kinna IF; IS Halmia; Billesholms GIF; Finspångs AIK; Åtvidabergs FF

Statistics of Swedish football Division 2 for the 1959 season.

== League standings ==
=== Norrland ===
Pos	Team	Pld	W	D	L	GF	GA	GD	Pts	Qualification or relegation
1	IFK Luleå	18	12	3	3	47	38	+9	27	Playoffs for promotion to Allsvenskan
2	IFK Holmsund	18	11	4	3	50	14	+36	26	
3	IFK Östersund	18	10	4	4	42	25	+17	24	
4	Skellefteå AIK	18	9	5	4	47	29	+18	23	
5	IF Älgarna	18	8	3	7	34	33	+1	19	
6	Lycksele IF	18	6	4	8	32	46	−14	16	
7	Marma IF	18	5	4	9	28	34	−6	14	
8	Fagerviks GF	18	2	7	9	19	34	−15	11	Relegation to Division 3
9	GIF Sundsvall	18	3	4	11	26	46	−20	10	Relegation to Division 3
10	Luleå SK	18	2	6	10	28	54	−26	10	Relegation to Division 3

=== Svealand ===
Pos	Team	Pld	W	D	L	GF	GA	GD	Pts	Qualification or relegation
1	Degerfors IF	22	16	2	4	68	25	+43	34	Playoffs for promotion to Allsvenskan
2	Örebro SK	22	16	1	5	64	20	+44	33	
3	IFK Eskilstuna	22	13	4	5	58	33	+25	30	
4	IK City	22	12	3	7	48	41	+7	27	
5	IFK Stockholm	22	10	6	6	36	30	+6	26	
6	IK Brage	22	9	4	9	42	45	−3	22	
7	Karlstads BIK	22	9	3	10	46	46	0	21	
8	Köpings IS	22	9	1	12	51	58	−7	19	
9	Avesta AIK	22	6	7	9	34	43	−9	19	
10	Hallstahammars SK	22	6	7	9	32	48	−16	19	Relegation to Division 3
11	Katrineholms SK	22	4	3	15	33	65	−32	11	Relegation to Division 3
12	Västerås SK	22	0	3	19	17	75	−58	3	Relegation to Division 3

=== Västra Götaland ===
Pos	Team	Pld	W	D	L	GF	GA	GD	Pts	Qualification or relegation
1	Jönköping Södra IF	22	16	4	2	49	19	+30	36	Playoffs for promotion to Allsvenskan
2	IF Elfsborg	22	16	1	5	57	26	+31	33	
3	Husqvarna IF	22	12	4	6	41	27	+14	28	
4	IK Oddevold	22	7	7	8	33	31	+2	21	
5	SK Sifhälla	22	8	5	9	23	32	−9	21	
6	Waggeryds IK	22	7	6	9	42	40	+2	20	
7	Trollhättans IF	22	8	4	10	25	44	−19	20	
8	Fässbergs IF	22	8	3	11	35	47	−12	19	
9	Norrby IF	22	7	4	11	36	42	−6	18	
10	Varbergs BoIS	22	5	8	9	29	35	−6	18	Relegation to Division 3
11	Kinna IF	22	5	6	11	23	34	−11	16	Relegation to Division 3
12	IS Halmia	22	6	2	14	27	43	−16	14	Relegation to Division 3

=== Östra Götaland ===
Pos	Team	Pld	W	D	L	GF	GA	GD	Pts	Qualification or relegation
1	Landskrona BoIS	22	13	8	1	51	19	+32	34	Playoffs for promotion to Allsvenskan
2	IFK Kristianstad	22	13	4	5	60	30	+30	30	
3	Högadals IS	22	12	4	6	47	33	+14	28	
4	BK Derby	22	9	7	6	39	29	+10	25	
5	Motala AIF	22	9	6	7	48	39	+9	24	
6	IK Sleipner	22	7	7	8	45	45	0	21	
7	Höganäs BK	22	9	2	11	35	51	−16	20	
8	Råå IF	22	6	7	9	26	38	−12	19	
9	Kalmar FF	22	5	7	10	38	47	−9	17	
10	Billesholms GIF	22	7	3	12	33	57	−24	17	Relegation to Division 3
11	Finspångs AIK	22	5	5	12	30	39	−9	15	Relegation to Division 3
12	Åtvidabergs FF	22	5	4	13	30	55	−25	14	Relegation to Division 3

== Allsvenskan promotion playoffs ==
- IFK Luleå - Jönköpings Södra IF 1-9 (1-2, 0-7)
- Degerfors IF - Landskrona BoIS 7-6 (2-3, 3-2, 2-1)

Jönköpings Södra IF and Degerfors IF promoted to Allsvenskan.
