= 1947–48 Division 2 (Swedish football) =

Swedish League Division 2
- Season: 1947–48
- Champions: Örebro SK; Landskrona BoIS
- Promoted: Örebro SK; Landskrona BoIS
- Relegated: Västerås IK; IFK Västerås; Husqvarna IF; IFK Uddevalla

Statistics of Swedish football Division 2 for the 1947–48 season.

== League standings ==
=== Division 2 Nordöstra 1947–48 ===
Teams from a large part of northern Sweden, approximately above the province of Medelpad, were not allowed to play in the national league system until the 1953–54 season, and a championship was instead played to decide the best team in Norrland.

Pos	Team	Pld	W	D	L	GF	GA	GD	Pts	Promotion or relegation
1	Örebro SK	18	12	2	4	44	23	+21	26	Promoted to Allsvenskan
2	Karlstads BIK	18	12	1	5	43	22	+21	25	League transfer within league level
3	Ludvika FfI	18	10	3	5	42	26	+16	23	
4	Sandvikens AIK	18	9	4	5	37	31	+6	22	
5	Reymersholms IK	18	7	5	6	31	28	+3	19	
6	Surahammars IF	18	7	3	8	28	25	+3	17	
7	Karlskoga IF	18	7	2	9	30	32	−2	16	
8	IK Sleipner	18	7	2	9	30	39	−9	16	
9	Västerås IK	18	5	4	9	21	35	−14	14	Relegated to Division 3
10	IFK Västerås	18	0	2	16	12	57	−45	2	Relegated to Division 3

=== Division 2 Sydvästra 1947–48 ===
Pos	Team	Pld	W	D	L	GF	GA	GD	Pts	Promotion or relegation
1	Landskrona BoIS	18	12	3	3	49	24	+25	27	Promoted to Allsvenskan
2	Örgryte IS	18	11	2	5	51	37	+14	24	
3	Tidaholms GIF	18	11	0	7	42	27	+15	22	
4	Åtvidabergs FF	18	9	3	6	47	24	+23	21	League transfer within league level
5	Kalmar FF	18	10	1	7	38	20	+18	21	
6	IFK Malmö	18	7	5	6	36	27	+9	19	
7	Höganäs BK	18	6	5	7	45	46	−1	17	
8	Billingsfors IK	18	5	5	8	27	52	−25	15	
9	Husqvarna IF	18	4	5	9	35	49	−14	13	Relegated to Division 3
10	IFK Uddevalla	18	0	1	17	16	80	−64	1	Relegated to Division 3
