= 1946–47 Division 2 (Swedish football) =

Swedish League Division 2
- Season: 1946–47
- Champions: Ludvika FFI; Jönköpings Södra IF; Örgryte IS; Halmstads BK
- Promoted: Jönköpings Södra IF; Halmstads BK
- Relegated: Västerås IK; IFK Västerås; Husqvarna IF; IFK Uddevalla

Statistics of Swedish football Division 2 for the 1946–47 season.

== League standings ==
=== Division 2 Norra 1946–47 ===
Teams from a large part of northern Sweden, approximately above the province of Medelpad, were not allowed to play in the national league system until the 1953–54 season, and a championship was instead played to decide the best team in Norrland.

Pos	Team	Pld	W	D	L	GF	GA	GD	Pts	Qualification or relegation
1	Ludvika FfI	18	15	1	2	45	18	+27	31	Playoffs for promotion to Allsvenskan
2	Sandvikens AIK	18	11	4	3	48	22	+26	26	League transfer within league level
3	Surahammars IF	18	9	2	7	26	23	+3	20	League transfer within league level
4	Västerås IK	18	7	4	7	32	34	−2	18	League transfer within league level
5	IFK Västerås	18	5	7	6	24	24	0	17	League transfer within league level
6	IK Brage	18	8	1	9	33	38	−5	17	Relegated to Division 3
7	Sandvikens IF	18	5	4	9	28	35	−7	14 (Note: Tie breaker is (probably) most scored goals.)	Relegated to Division 3
8	Avesta AIK	18	5	4	9	26	33	−7	14	Relegated to Division 3
9	Iggesunds IK	18	5	4	9	26	39	−13	14	Relegated to Division 3
10	Enköpings SK	18	4	1	13	19	41	−22	9	Relegated to Division 3

=== Division 2 Östra 1946–47 ===
Pos	Team	Pld	W	D	L	GF	GA	GD	Pts	Qualification or relegation
1	Jönköpings Södra IF	18	13	2	3	63	22	+41	28	Playoffs for promotion to Allsvenskan
2	Åtvidabergs FF	18	12	3	3	52	27	+25	27	League transfer within league level
3	IK Sleipner	18	8	6	4	41	29	+12	22	League transfer within league level
4	Husqvarna IF	18	9	2	7	44	42	+2	20	League transfer within league level
5	Reymersholms IK	18	7	5	6	26	29	−3	19	League transfer within league level
6	BK Derby	18	7	2	9	19	32	−13	16	Relegated to Division 3
7	IFK Eskilstuna	18	7	1	10	19	33	−14	15	Relegated to Division 3
8	IFK Värnamo	18	5	4	9	32	39	−7	14	Relegated to Division 3
9	IFK Lidingö	18	5	3	10	24	34	−10	13	Relegated to Division 3
10	Hammarby IF	18	2	2	14	14	47	−33	6	Relegated to Division 3

=== Division 2 Västra 1946–47 ===
Pos	Team	Pld	W	D	L	GF	GA	GD	Pts	Qualification or relegation
1	Örgryte IS	18	13	2	3	53	26	+27	28	Playoffs for promotion to Allsvenskan
2	Tidaholms GIF	18	10	4	4	48	25	+23	24	League transfer within league level
3	IFK Uddevalla	18	8	5	5	28	24	+4	21	League transfer within league level
4	Karlstads BIK	18	9	2	7	36	31	+5	20	League transfer within league level
5	Karlskoga IF	18	8	4	6	33	33	0	20	League transfer within league level
6	Lundby IF	18	5	7	6	17	21	−4	17	Relegated to Division 3
7	IFK Trollhättan	18	5	5	8	29	36	−7	15	Relegated to Division 3
8	Göteborgs FF	18	6	1	11	22	29	−7	13	Relegated to Division 3
9	IF Viken	18	5	2	11	29	45	−16	12	Relegated to Division 3
10	Deje IK	18	4	2	12	21	46	−25	10	Relegated to Division 3

=== Division 2 Södra 1946–47 ===
Pos	Team	Pld	W	D	L	GF	GA	GD	Pts	Qualification or relegation
1	Halmstads BK	18	11	3	4	56	27	+29	25	Playoffs for promotion to Allsvenskan
2	Landskrona BoIS	18	9	4	5	46	36	+10	22	League transfer within league level
3	IFK Malmö	18	9	3	6	40	33	+7	21	League transfer within league level
4	Kalmar FF	18	10	1	7	36	31	+5	21	League transfer within league level
5	Höganäs BK	18	9	2	7	50	39	+11	20	League transfer within league level
6	Kalmar AIK	18	9	2	7	41	41	0	20	Relegated to Division 3
7	Olofströms IF	18	7	1	10	42	51	−9	15	Relegated to Division 3
8	Malmö BI	18	4	5	9	30	50	−20	13	Relegated to Division 3
9	Nybro IF	18	4	4	10	28	40	−12	12	Relegated to Division 3
10	Alets IK	18	4	3	11	22	43	−21	11	Relegated to Division 3
