= 1929–30 Division 2 (Swedish football) =

Swedish League Division 2
- Season: 1929–30
- Champions: IFK Eskilstuna; Redbergslids IK
- Promoted: IFK Eskilstuna; Redbergslids IK
- Relegated: Köpings IS; Sundbybergs IK; Krokslätts FF; IFK Uddevalla

Statistics of Swedish football Division 2 for the 1929–30 season.

== League standings ==
=== Division 2 Norra 1929–30 ===
Teams from a large part of northern Sweden, approximately above the province of Medelpad, were not allowed to play in the national league system until the 1953–54 season, and a championship was instead played to decide the best team in Norrland.

Pos	Team	Pld	W	D	L	GF	GA	GD	Pts	Promotion or relegation
1	IFK Eskilstuna	20	12	6	2	68	40	+28	30	Promoted to Allsvenskan
2	Hammarby IF	20	13	3	4	52	31	+21	29 (Note: Tie breaker is goal average.)	
3	Sandvikens AIK	20	13	3	4	67	46	+21	29	
4	Gefle IF	20	11	2	7	53	38	+15	24	
5	Hallstahammars SK	20	10	3	7	44	34	+10	23	
6	IFK Västerås	20	9	2	9	43	40	+3	20	
7	Westermalms IF	20	7	4	9	48	49	−1	18	
8	Surahammars IF	20	6	5	9	43	45	−2	17	
9	IK City	20	5	6	9	30	38	−8	16	
10	Köpings IS	20	3	2	15	31	65	−34	8	Relegated to Division 3
11	Sundbybergs IK	20	2	2	16	27	69	−42	6	Relegated to Division 3

=== Division 2 Södra 1929–30 ===
Pos	Team	Pld	W	D	L	GF	GA	GD	Pts	Promotion or relegation
1	Redbergslids IK	18	15	1	2	56	19	+37	31	Promoted to Allsvenskan
2	Malmö FF	18	9	2	7	47	34	+13	20 (Note: Tie breaker is goal average.)	
3	Fässbergs IF	18	9	2	7	38	30	+8	20	
4	Halmstads BK	18	7	5	6	36	31	+5	19	
5	BK Derby	18	8	3	7	33	42	−9	19	
6	IFK Kristianstad	18	7	4	7	48	44	+4	18	
7	Kalmar FF	18	6	4	8	31	44	−13	16	
8	IS Halmia	18	4	7	7	26	25	+1	15	
9	Krokslätts FF	18	5	4	9	27	48	−21	14	Relegated to Division 3
10	IFK Uddevalla	18	3	2	13	27	52	−25	8	Relegated to Division 3
