= 1948–49 Division 2 (Swedish football) =

Swedish League Division 2
- Season: 1948–49
- Champions: Djurgårdens IF; Kalmar FF
- Promoted: Djurgårdens IF; Kalmar FF
- Relegated: Sandvikens IF; Ludvika FFI; Tidaholms GIF; Billingsfors IK

Statistics of Swedish football Division 2 for the 1948–49 season.

== League standings ==
=== Division 2 Nordöstra 1948–49 ===
Teams from a large part of northern Sweden, approximately above the province of Medelpad, were not allowed to play in the national league system until the 1953–54 season, and a championship was instead played to decide the best team in Norrland.

Pos	Team	Pld	W	D	L	GF	GA	GD	Pts	Promotion or relegation
1	Djurgårdens IF	18	17	1	0	64	16	+48	35	Promoted to Allsvenskan
2	Åtvidabergs FF	18	8	4	6	42	33	+9	20	League transfer within league level
3	Sundbybergs IK	18	8	3	7	47	37	+10	19	
4	IK Sleipner	18	8	3	7	37	47	−10	19	League transfer within league level
5	Surahammars IF	18	6	5	7	28	34	−6	17	
6	Sandvikens AIK	18	7	2	9	44	35	+9	16	
7	Karlskoga IF	18	7	2	9	30	36	−6	16	
8	Reymersholms IK	18	6	2	10	26	43	−17	14	
9	Sandvikens IF	18	5	3	10	30	40	−10	13	Relegated to Division 3
10	Ludvika FfI	18	4	3	11	23	46	−23	11	Relegated to Division 3

=== Division 2 Sydvästra 1948–49 ===
Pos	Team	Pld	W	D	L	GF	GA	GD	Pts	Promotion or relegation
1	Kalmar FF	18	10	5	3	36	27	+9	25	Promoted to Allsvenskan
2	IFK Malmö	18	9	4	5	42	35	+7	22	
3	Halmstads BK	18	8	5	5	40	35	+5	21	
4	Höganäs BK	18	7	6	5	30	23	+7	20	
5	Råå IF	18	7	6	5	40	36	+4	20	
6	Örgryte IS	18	8	3	7	44	23	+21	19	
7	Jonsereds IF	18	8	2	8	44	34	+10	18	
8	Karlstads BIK	18	6	5	7	28	34	−6	17	League transfer within league level
9	Tidaholms GIF	18	4	2	12	22	48	−26	10	Relegated to Division 3
10	Billingsfors IK	18	3	2	13	24	55	−31	8	Relegated to Division 3
