= 1963 Division 2 (Swedish football) =

Swedish League Division 2
- Season: 1963
- Champions: GIF Sundsvall; IFK Eskilstuna; GAIS; Östers IF
- Promoted: GAIS; IFK Eskilstuna
- Relegated: Gimonäs CK; Bollnäs GIF; Norsjö IF; Avesta AIK; IK City; IFK Kumla; Västra Frölunda IF; IK Oddevold; Kinna IF; Jönköpings Södra IF; Motala AIF; Saltö BK

Statistics of Swedish football Division 2 for the 1963 season.

== League standings ==
=== Norrland ===
| Pos | Team | Pld | W | D | L | GF | GA | GD | Pts | Qualification or relegation |
|---|---|---|---|---|---|---|---|---|---|---|
| 1 | GIF Sundsvall | 18 | 13 | 3 | 2 | 54 | 15 | +39 | 29 | Playoffs for promotion to Allsvenskan. |
| 2 | IFK Holmsund | 18 | 10 | 5 | 3 | 34 | 17 | +17 | 25 | |
| 3 | Skellefteå AIK | 18 | 8 | 5 | 5 | 29 | 15 | +14 | 21 | |
| 4 | IFK Luleå | 18 | 8 | 3 | 7 | 24 | 34 | −10 | 19 | |
| 5 | Lycksele IF | 18 | 7 | 4 | 7 | 30 | 22 | +8 | 18 | |
| 6 | Sandåkerns SK | 18 | 6 | 6 | 6 | 30 | 33 | −3 | 18 | |
| 7 | Söderhamns IF | 18 | 8 | 2 | 8 | 28 | 32 | −4 | 18 | |
| 8 | Gimonäs CK | 18 | 5 | 2 | 11 | 23 | 39 | −16 | 12 | Relegation to Division 3 |
| 9 | Bollnäs GIF | 18 | 3 | 4 | 11 | 28 | 50 | −22 | 10 | Relegation to Division 3 |
| 10 | Norsjö IF | 18 | 3 | 4 | 11 | 33 | 56 | −23 | 10 | Relegation to Division 3 |

=== Svealand ===
| Pos | Team | Pld | W | D | L | GF | GA | GD | Pts | Qualification or relegation |
|---|---|---|---|---|---|---|---|---|---|---|
| 1 | IFK Eskilstuna | 22 | 19 | 1 | 2 | 60 | 21 | +39 | 39 | Playoffs for promotion to Allsvenskan. |
| 2 | Sandvikens IF | 22 | 17 | 3 | 2 | 55 | 19 | +36 | 37 | |
| 3 | IK Brage | 22 | 14 | 2 | 6 | 57 | 27 | +30 | 30 | |
| 4 | Sundbybergs IK | 22 | 12 | 4 | 6 | 55 | 35 | +20 | 28 | |
| 5 | IFK Stockholm | 22 | 10 | 4 | 8 | 47 | 42 | +5 | 24 | |
| 6 | Sandvikens AIK | 22 | 10 | 2 | 10 | 42 | 41 | +1 | 22 | |
| 7 | Hallstahammars SK | 22 | 6 | 8 | 8 | 34 | 48 | −14 | 20 | |
| 8 | IFK Sunne | 22 | 8 | 2 | 12 | 37 | 41 | −4 | 18 | |
| 9 | SK Sifhälla | 22 | 5 | 5 | 12 | 22 | 48 | −26 | 15 | |
| 10 | Avesta AIK | 22 | 5 | 2 | 15 | 27 | 51 | −24 | 12 | Relegation to Division 3 |
| 11 | IK City | 22 | 3 | 4 | 15 | 21 | 57 | −36 | 10 | Relegation to Division 3 |
| 12 | IFK Kumla | 22 | 2 | 5 | 15 | 23 | 50 | −27 | 9 | Relegation to Division 3 |

=== Västra Götaland ===
| Pos | Team | Pld | W | D | L | GF | GA | GD | Pts | Qualification or relegation |
|---|---|---|---|---|---|---|---|---|---|---|
| 1 | GAIS | 22 | 16 | 5 | 1 | 63 | 20 | +43 | 37 | Playoffs for promotion to Allsvenskan. |
| 2 | IFK Malmö | 22 | 15 | 3 | 4 | 59 | 25 | +34 | 33 | |
| 3 | Redbergslids IK | 22 | 13 | 4 | 5 | 51 | 38 | +13 | 30 | |
| 4 | Norrby IF | 22 | 13 | 3 | 6 | 56 | 46 | +10 | 29 | |
| 5 | Landskrona BoIS | 22 | 13 | 2 | 7 | 45 | 37 | +8 | 28 | |
| 6 | Varbergs BoIS | 22 | 9 | 2 | 11 | 34 | 35 | −1 | 20 | |
| 7 | Malmö BI | 22 | 5 | 7 | 10 | 36 | 45 | −9 | 17 | |
| 8 | Gunnarstorps IF | 22 | 6 | 5 | 11 | 37 | 55 | −18 | 17 | |
| 9 | Halmstads BK | 22 | 5 | 7 | 10 | 32 | 52 | −20 | 17 | |
| 10 | Västra Frölunda IF | 22 | 6 | 2 | 14 | 42 | 58 | −16 | 14 | Relegation to Division 3 |
| 11 | IK Oddevold | 22 | 5 | 1 | 16 | 31 | 51 | −20 | 11 | Relegation to Division 3 |
| 12 | Kinna IF | 22 | 3 | 5 | 14 | 23 | 47 | −24 | 11 | Relegation to Division 3 |

=== Östra Götaland ===
| Pos | Team | Pld | W | D | L | GF | GA | GD | Pts | Qualification or relegation |
|---|---|---|---|---|---|---|---|---|---|---|
| 1 | Östers IF | 22 | 11 | 8 | 3 | 56 | 29 | +27 | 30 | Playoffs for promotion to Allsvenskan. |
| 2 | Åtvidabergs FF | 22 | 12 | 5 | 5 | 60 | 33 | +27 | 29 | |
| 3 | IF Saab | 22 | 9 | 8 | 5 | 33 | 29 | +4 | 26 | |
| 4 | BK Derby | 22 | 10 | 4 | 8 | 46 | 36 | +10 | 24 | |
| 5 | Högadals IS | 22 | 9 | 5 | 8 | 34 | 35 | −1 | 23 | |
| 6 | IFK Kristianstad | 22 | 9 | 4 | 9 | 41 | 36 | +5 | 22 | |
| 7 | Huskvarna IF | 22 | 8 | 6 | 8 | 31 | 32 | −1 | 22 | |
| 8 | Kalmar FF | 22 | 9 | 1 | 12 | 26 | 40 | −14 | 19 | |
| 9 | Bromölla IF | 22 | 7 | 4 | 11 | 32 | 30 | +2 | 18 | |
| 10 | Jönköpings Södra IF | 22 | 7 | 4 | 11 | 24 | 37 | −13 | 18 | Relegation to Division 3 |
| 11 | Motala AIF | 22 | 4 | 9 | 9 | 22 | 46 | −24 | 17 | Relegation to Division 3 |
| 12 | Saltö BK | 22 | 5 | 6 | 11 | 29 | 51 | −22 | 16 | Relegation to Division 3 |

== Allsvenskan promotion playoffs ==
| Pos | Team | Pld | W | D | L | GF | GA | GD | Pts | Promotion |
|---|---|---|---|---|---|---|---|---|---|---|
| 1 | GAIS | 3 | 2 | 1 | 0 | 4 | 1 | +3 | 5 | Promotion to Allsvenskan |
| 2 | IFK Eskilstuna | 3 | 1 | 2 | 0 | 4 | 1 | +3 | 4 | Promotion to Allsvenskan |
| 3 | GIF Sundsvall | 3 | 1 | 1 | 1 | 5 | 5 | 0 | 3 | |
| 4 | Östers IF | 3 | 0 | 0 | 3 | 1 | 7 | −6 | 0 | |
