= 1950–51 Division 2 (Swedish football) =

Swedish League Division 2
- Season: 1950–51
- Champions: Åtvidabergs FF; IFK Göteborg
- Promoted: Åtvidabergs FF; IFK Göteborg
- Relegated: Karlskoga IF; Surahammars IF; Örgryte IS; Huskvarna Södra IS

Statistics of Swedish football Division 2 for the 1950–51 season.

== League standings ==
=== Division 2 Nordöstra 1950–51 ===
Teams from a large part of northern Sweden, approximately above the province of Medelpad, were not allowed to play in the national league system until the 1953–54 season, and a championship was instead played to decide the best team in Norrland.

Pos	Team	Pld	W	D	L	GF	GA	GD	Pts	Promotion or relegation
1	Åtvidabergs FF	18	11	4	3	57	28	+29	26	Promoted to Allsvenskan
2	Sandvikens IF	18	10	5	3	60	29	+31	25	
3	IF Viken	18	7	7	4	39	28	+11	21	
4	Hammarby IF	18	8	4	6	43	36	+7	20	
5	IK City	18	7	3	8	36	36	0	17	
6	Sandvikens AIK	18	6	5	7	41	44	−3	17	
7	IK Brage	18	6	4	8	30	40	−10	16	
8	Karlstads BIK	18	6	3	9	27	38	−11	15	
9	Karlskoga IF	18	6	2	10	26	37	−11	14	Relegated to Division 3
10	Surahammars IF	18	4	1	13	22	55	−33	9	Relegated to Division 3

=== Division 2 Sydvästra 1950–51 ===
Pos	Team	Pld	W	D	L	GF	GA	GD	Pts	Promotion or relegation
1	IFK Göteborg	18	12	2	4	47	26	+21	26	Promoted to Allsvenskan
2	IFK Malmö	18	10	4	4	47	25	+22	24	
3	IS Halmia	18	10	3	5	35	26	+9	23	
4	Lunds BK	18	8	4	6	33	31	+2	20	
5	Landskrona BoIS	18	6	6	6	33	32	+1	18	
6	Norrby IF	18	7	3	8	23	25	−2	17	
7	Halmstads BK	18	6	5	7	28	34	−6	17	
8	Höganäs BK	18	3	8	7	30	43	−13	14	
9	Örgryte IS	18	5	3	10	25	30	−5	13	Relegated to Division 3
10	Huskvarna Södra IS	18	4	0	14	21	50	−29	8	Relegated to Division 3
