= 1978 Division 2 (Swedish football) =

Swedish League Division 2
- Season: 1978
- Champions: IFK Sundsvall; IS Halmia
- Promoted: IFK Sundsvall; IS Halmia
- Relegated: IF Brommapojkarna; Kramforsalliansen; Brynäs IF; Trelleborgs FF; IF Saab; IFK Kristianstad

Statistics of Swedish football Division 2 in season 1978.

== League standings ==
=== Norra ===
Pos	Team	Pld	W	D	L	GF	GA	GD	Pts	Promotion or relegation
1	IFK Sundsvall	26	17	5	4	57	25	+32	39	Promotion to Allsvenskan
2	IK Brage	26	14	10	2	48	15	+33	38	
3	Nyköpings BIS	26	12	7	7	38	21	+17	31	
4	IFK Eskilstuna	26	12	7	7	45	32	+13	31	
5	BK Derby	26	13	4	9	34	25	+9	30	
6	GIF Sundsvall	26	10	9	7	43	36	+7	29	
7	IK Sirius	26	10	8	8	36	29	+7	28	
8	Sandvikens IF	26	9	7	10	48	38	+10	25	
9	Hudiksvalls ABK	26	9	5	12	37	41	−4	23	
10	Vasalunds IF	26	9	5	12	28	44	−16	23	
11	IFK Västerås	26	9	4	13	33	41	−8	22	
12	IF Brommapojkarna	26	9	4	13	31	43	−12	22	Relegation to Division 3
13	Kramforsalliansen	26	6	3	17	32	75	−43	15	Relegation to Division 3
14	Brynäs IF	26	3	2	21	20	61	−41	8	Relegation to Division 3

=== Södra ===
Pos	Team	Pld	W	D	L	GF	GA	GD	Pts	Promotion or relegation
1	IS Halmia	26	13	7	6	40	26	+14	33	Promotion to Allsvenskan
2	Norrby IF	26	12	7	7	48	38	+10	31	
3	BK Häcken	26	11	8	7	42	30	+12	30	
4	Mjällby AIF	26	9	12	5	48	42	+6	30	
5	Örgryte IS	26	11	6	9	56	38	+18	28	
6	Helsingborgs IF	26	9	9	8	32	28	+4	27	
7	GAIS	26	9	9	8	33	34	−1	27	
8	IFK Malmö	26	11	5	10	32	33	−1	27	
9	Jönköpings Södra IF	26	8	10	8	34	30	+4	26	
10	Alvesta GIF	26	9	7	10	43	42	+1	25	
11	IFK Hässleholm	26	9	6	11	33	50	−17	24	
12	Trelleborgs FF	26	8	5	13	32	37	−5	21	Relegation to Division 3
13	IF Saab	26	8	5	13	31	38	−7	21	Relegation to Division 3
14	IFK Kristianstad	26	4	6	16	25	63	−38	14	Relegation to Division 3
