= 1965 Division 2 (Swedish football) =

Swedish League Division 2
- Season: 1965
- Champions: Gefle IF; IK Brage; GAIS; Grimsås IF
- Promoted: GAIS; IK Brage
- Relegated: Skellefteå AIK; Sunnanå SK; Råsunda IS; IF KB 63; IF Sylvia; Halmstads BK; Västra Frölunda IF; Göteborgs AIK; IFK Kristianstad; Högadals IS; IFK Karlshamn

Statistics of Swedish football Division 2 for the 1965 season.

== League standings ==
=== Norrland ===
Pos	Team	Pld	W	D	L	GF	GA	GD	Pts	Qualification or relegation
1	Gefle IF	18	12	3	3	36	12	+24	27	Playoffs for promotion to Allsvenskan
2	Sandvikens AIK	18	11	3	4	46	28	+18	25	
3	IFK Holmsund	18	7	6	5	33	21	+12	20	
4	Lycksele IF	18	9	2	7	39	32	+7	20	
5	IFK Östersund	18	7	3	8	25	26	−1	17	
6	Luleå SK	18	5	7	6	23	26	−3	17	
7	Brynäs IF	18	7	3	8	31	35	−4	17	
8	Sandåkerns SK	18	7	2	9	32	35	−3	16	
9	Skellefteå AIK	18	6	3	9	24	28	−4	15	Relegation to Division 3
10	Sunnanå SK	18	1	4	13	16	62	−46	6	Relegation to Division 3

=== Svealand ===
Pos	Team	Pld	W	D	L	GF	GA	GD	Pts	Qualification or relegation
1	IK Brage	22	15	5	2	54	23	+31	35	Playoffs for promotion to Allsvenskan
2	IFK Stockholm	22	14	4	4	56	23	+33	32	
3	IFK Eskilstuna	22	12	3	7	48	24	+24	27	
4	SK Sifhälla	22	12	0	10	48	42	+6	24	
5	Sundbybergs IK	22	8	7	7	47	41	+6	23	
6	Karlstads BK	22	10	3	9	33	43	−10	23	
7	Sandvikens IF	22	8	6	8	42	41	+1	22	
8	Västerås SK	22	9	3	10	54	34	+20	21	
9	Södertälje SK	22	7	4	11	41	53	−12	18	
10	Råsunda IS	22	6	5	11	28	41	−13	17	Relegation to Division 3
11	IF Karlskoga-Bofors 63	22	5	4	13	25	54	−29	14	Relegation to Division 3
12	IF Sylvia	22	3	2	17	29	86	−57	8	Relegation to Division 3

=== Västra Götaland ===
Pos	Team	Pld	W	D	L	GF	GA	GD	Pts	Qualification or relegation
1	GAIS	22	16	3	3	52	24	+28	35	Playoffs for promotion to Allsvenskan
2	Landskrona BoIS	22	13	6	3	58	28	+30	32	
3	GIF Nike	22	11	2	9	41	54	−13	24	
4	Gunnarstorps IF	22	9	5	8	38	32	+6	23	
5	IFK Malmö	22	10	3	9	47	42	+5	23	
6	IS Halmia	22	9	3	10	52	40	+12	21	
7	IFK Ystad	22	8	4	10	41	44	−3	20	
8	Redbergslids IK	22	8	3	11	32	42	−10	19	
9	Varbergs BoIS	22	6	7	9	28	38	−10	19	
10	Halmstads BK	22	7	4	11	36	39	−3	18	Relegation to Division 3
11	Västra Frölunda IF	22	7	3	12	40	45	−5	17	Relegation to Division 3
12	Göteborgs AIK	22	4	5	13	29	66	−37	13	Relegation to Division 3

=== Östra Götaland ===
Pos	Team	Pld	W	D	L	GF	GA	GD	Pts	Qualification or relegation
1	Grimsås IF	22	13	3	6	40	27	+13	29	Playoffs for promotion to Allsvenskan
2	Östers IF	22	13	2	7	51	32	+19	28	
3	Hässleholms IF	22	10	6	6	40	29	+11	26	
4	IF Saab	22	11	3	8	36	25	+11	25	
5	Bromölla IF	22	9	6	7	45	35	+10	24	
6	Kalmar FF	22	10	2	10	49	44	+5	22	
7	Jönköpings Södra IF	22	10	2	10	29	33	−4	22	
8	Åtvidabergs FF	22	9	3	10	52	28	+24	21	
9	Gnosjö IF	22	8	5	9	36	51	−15	21	
10	IFK Kristianstad	22	7	6	9	32	38	−6	20	Relegation to Division 3
11	Högadals IS	22	5	5	12	30	52	−22	15	Relegation to Division 3
12	IFK Karlshamn	22	3	5	14	35	71	−36	11	Relegation to Division 3

== Allsvenskan promotion playoffs ==
Pos	Team	Pld	W	D	L	GF	GA	GD	Pts	Promotion
1	GAIS	3	3	0	0	9	3	+6	6	Promotion to Allsvenskan
2	IK Brage	3	1	1	1	5	5	0	3	Promotion to Allsvenskan
3	Grimsås IF	3	1	0	2	1	4	−3	2	
4	Gefle IF	3	0	1	2	2	5	−3	1	
