= 1931–32 Division 2 (Swedish football) =

Swedish League Division 2
- Season: 1931–32
- Champions: Sandvikens IF; IS Halmia
- Promoted: Sandvikens IF; IS Halmia
- Relegated: Skärgårdens IF; IFK Kristianstad

Statistics of Swedish football Division 2 for the 1931–32 season.

== League standings ==
=== Division 2 Norra 1931–32 ===
Teams from a large part of northern Sweden, approximately above the province of Medelpad, were not allowed to play in the national league system until the 1953–54 season, and a championship was instead played to decide the best team in Norrland.

Pos	Team	Pld	W	D	L	GF	GA	GD	Pts	Promotion or relegation
1	Sandvikens IF	20	16	2	2	64	28	+36	34	Promoted to Allsvenskan
2	IFK Norrköping	20	12	2	6	84	28	+56	26	League transfer within league level
3	IK Brage	20	11	2	7	43	25	+18	24	
4	IFK Västerås	20	9	4	7	35	36	−1	22	
5	Sandvikens AIK	20	8	4	8	32	43	−11	20	
6	Surahammars IF	20	7	5	8	38	42	−4	19	
7	Hammarby IF	20	7	4	9	33	44	−11	18	League transfer within league level
8	Gefle IF	20	6	5	9	52	50	+2	17	
9	Westermalms IF	20	5	6	9	34	44	−10	16 (Note: Tie breaker is goal average.)	League transfer within league level
10	IFK Kumla	20	6	4	10	27	52	−25	16	
11	Skärgårdens IF	20	3	2	15	34	84	−50	8	Relegated to Division 3

=== Division 2 Södra 1931–32 ===
Pos	Team	Pld	W	D	L	GF	GA	GD	Pts	Promotion or relegation
1	IS Halmia	16	10	4	2	37	17	+20	24	Promoted to Allsvenskan
2	BK Derby	16	9	3	4	40	30	+10	21	League transfer within league level
3	Halmstads BK	16	8	3	5	37	28	+9	19	
4	Höganäs BK	16	7	3	6	46	36	+10	17	
5	Stattena IF	16	7	2	7	27	29	−2	16	
6	Fässbergs IF	16	5	4	7	27	30	−3	14	League transfer within league level
7	Mjölby AI	16	4	5	7	29	41	−12	13	League transfer within league level
8	BK Drott	16	3	5	8	39	41	−2	11	
9	IFK Kristianstad	16	3	3	10	18	48	−30	9	Relegated to Division 3
