= 1928–29 Division 2 (Swedish football) =

Swedish League Division 2
- Season: 1928–29
- Champions: Sandvikens IF; Stattena IF
- Promoted: Sandvikens IF; Stattena IF
- Relegated: Djurgårdens IF; IFK Stockholm; IS Halmia; Jonsereds IF

Statistics of Swedish football Division 2 for the 1928–29 season.

== League standings ==
=== Division 2 Norra 1928–29 ===
Teams from a large part of northern Sweden, approximately above the province of Medelpad, were not allowed to play in the national league system until the 1953–54 season, and a championship was instead played to decide the best team in Norrland.

Pos	Team	Pld	W	D	L	GF	GA	GD	Pts	Promotion or relegation
1	Sandvikens IF	18	13	2	3	56	20	+36	28	Promoted to Allsvenskan
2	Hallstahammars SK	18	8	5	5	31	28	+3	21	
3	Sundbybergs IK	18	10	0	8	45	38	+7	20	
4	Hammarby IF	18	8	3	7	30	27	+3	19	
5	Gefle IF	18	6	5	7	39	34	+5	17 (Note: Tie breaker is goal average.)	
6	Surahammars IF	18	5	7	6	37	41	−4	17	
7	IFK Västerås	18	7	1	10	32	43	−11	15	
8	IK City	18	5	5	8	34	51	−17	15	
9	Djurgårdens IF	18	5	4	9	27	37	−10	14	Relegated to Division 3
10	IFK Stockholm	18	7	0	11	34	43	−9	14	Relegated to Division 3

=== Division 2 Södra 1928–29 ===
Pos	Team	Pld	W	D	L	GF	GA	GD	Pts	Promotion or relegation
1	Stattena IF	18	12	3	3	45	22	+23	27	Promoted to Allsvenskan
2	Redbergslids IK	18	12	1	5	47	25	+22	25	
3	Halmstads BK	18	11	1	6	46	29	+17	23	
4	Malmö FF	18	8	2	8	42	41	+1	18	
5	Kalmar FF	18	6	4	8	42	44	−2	16	
6	IFK Uddevalla	18	7	1	10	29	43	−14	15	
7	Fässbergs IF	18	7	0	11	36	42	−6	14 (Note: Tie breaker is goal average.)	
8	Krokslätts FF	18	6	2	10	29	40	−11	14	
9	IS Halmia (Note: IS Halmia who finished second last in their league, and should have been relegated, were allowed to remain in Division 2.)	18	5	4	9	23	34	−11	14	Relegated to Division 3
10	Jonsereds IF	18	6	2	10	30	49	−19	14	Relegated to Division 3
