= 1949–50 Division 2 (Swedish football) =

Swedish League Division 2
- Season: 1949–50
- Champions: Örebro SK; Råå IF
- Promoted: Örebro SK; Råå IF
- Relegated: Sundbybergs IK; Reymersholms IK; Jonsereds IF; IK Sleipner

Statistics of Swedish football Division 2 for the 1949–50 season.

== League standings ==
=== Division 2 Nordöstra 1949–50 ===
Teams from a large part of northern Sweden, approximately above the province of Medelpad, were not allowed to play in the national league system until the 1953–54 season, and a championship was instead played to decide the best team in Norrland.

Pos	Team	Pld	W	D	L	GF	GA	GD	Pts	Promotion or relegation
1	Örebro SK	18	11	6	1	49	24	+25	28	Promoted to Allsvenskan
2	Surahammars IF	18	11	3	4	43	23	+20	25	
3	IK City	18	11	2	5	47	32	+15	24	
4	Karlstads BIK	18	9	2	7	27	24	+3	20	
5	IF Viken	18	8	0	10	36	41	−5	16	
6	Karlskoga IF	18	5	6	7	28	34	−6	16	
7	IK Brage	18	6	3	9	31	46	−15	15	
8	Sandvikens AIK	18	6	2	10	30	39	−9	14	
9	Sundbybergs IK	18	4	3	11	29	42	−13	11	Relegated to Division 3
10	Reymersholms IK	18	3	5	10	19	34	−15	11	Relegated to Division 3

=== Division 2 Sydvästra 1949–50 ===
Pos	Team	Pld	W	D	L	GF	GA	GD	Pts	Promotion or relegation
1	Råå IF	18	14	2	2	45	13	+32	30	Promoted to Allsvenskan
2	Halmstads BK	18	9	6	3	59	43	+16	24	
3	Landskrona BoIS	18	8	4	6	38	29	+9	20	
4	Örgryte IS	18	8	2	8	41	32	+9	18	
5	Huskvarna Södra IS	18	9	0	9	35	39	−4	18	
6	Höganäs BK	18	8	2	8	28	33	−5	18	
7	Åtvidabergs FF	18	8	1	9	41	43	−2	17	
8	IFK Malmö	18	7	2	9	33	36	−3	16	
9	Jonsereds IF	18	6	1	11	34	50	−16	13	Relegated to Division 3
10	IK Sleipner	18	2	2	14	24	60	−36	6	Relegated to Division 3
