= 1930–31 Division 2 (Swedish football) =

Swedish League Division 2
- Season: 1930–31
- Champions: Hallstahammars SK; Malmö FF
- Promoted: Hallstahammars SK; Malmö FF
- Relegated: IK City; Mariehofs IF; Kalmar AIK; Kalmar FF

Statistics of Swedish football Division 2 for the 1930–31 season.

== League standings ==
=== Division 2 Norra 1930–31 ===
Teams from a large part of northern Sweden, approximately above the province of Medelpad, were not allowed to play in the national league system until the 1953–54 season, and a championship was instead played to decide the best team in Norrland.

Pos	Team	Pld	W	D	L	GF	GA	GD	Pts	Promotion or relegation
1	Hallstahammars SK	20	12	3	5	38	23	+15	27 (Note: Tie breaker is goal average.)	Promoted to Allsvenskan
2	IK Brage	20	12	3	5	52	34	+18	27	
3	Hammarby IF	20	11	2	7	47	41	+6	24	
4	Gefle IF	20	9	5	6	50	24	+26	23	
5	IFK Norrköping	20	9	4	7	46	29	+17	22	
6	Sandvikens AIK	20	9	4	7	58	47	+11	22	
7	Surahammars IF	20	7	4	9	55	51	+4	18	
8	IFK Västerås	20	6	6	8	34	42	−8	18	
9	Westermalms IF	20	6	4	10	38	50	−12	16	
10	IK City	20	7	2	11	41	64	−23	16	Relegated to Division 3
11	Mariehofs IF	20	2	3	15	28	82	−54	7	Relegated to Division 3

=== Division 2 Södra 1930–31 ===
Pos	Team	Pld	W	D	L	GF	GA	GD	Pts	Promotion or relegation
1	Malmö FF	18	11	3	4	50	22	+28	25	Promoted to Allsvenskan
2	BK Drott	18	10	4	4	41	24	+17	24	
3	Fässbergs IF	18	10	3	5	36	25	+11	23	
4	IFK Kristianstad	18	9	4	5	36	29	+7	22 (Note: Tie breaker is goal average.)	
5	Halmstads BK	18	10	2	6	31	23	+8	22	
6	IS Halmia	18	7	4	7	28	24	+4	18	
7	BK Derby	18	6	3	9	26	35	−9	15	
8	Stattena IF	18	4	6	8	30	38	−8	14	
9	Kalmar AIK	18	5	1	12	24	43	−19	11	Relegated to Division 3
10	Kalmar FF	18	3	0	15	15	51	−36	6	Relegated to Division 3
