= 1977 Division 2 (Swedish football) =

Swedish League Division 2
- Season: 1977
- Champions: Västerås SK; Åtvidabergs FF
- Promoted: Västerås SK; Åtvidabergs FF
- Relegated: IK Sleipner; KB Karlskoga; Lycksele IF; Råå IF; IFK Ulricehamn; Grimsås IF

Statistics of Swedish football Division 2 in season 1977.

== League standings ==
=== Norra ===
| Pos | Team | Pld | W | D | L | GF | GA | GD | Pts | Promotion or relegation |
|---|---|---|---|---|---|---|---|---|---|---|
| 1 | Västerås SK | 26 | 13 | 10 | 3 | 43 | 25 | +18 | 36 | Promotion to Allsvenskan |
| 2 | Sandvikens IF | 26 | 13 | 7 | 6 | 44 | 26 | +18 | 33 | |
| 3 | IK Sirius | 26 | 12 | 5 | 9 | 38 | 32 | +6 | 29 | |
| 4 | Hudiksvalls ABK | 26 | 9 | 9 | 8 | 36 | 33 | +3 | 27 | |
| 5 | IF Brommapojkarna | 26 | 9 | 9 | 8 | 31 | 29 | +2 | 27 | |
| 6 | IFK Eskilstuna | 26 | 9 | 9 | 8 | 36 | 39 | −3 | 27 | |
| 7 | IF Saab | 26 | 9 | 8 | 9 | 43 | 39 | +4 | 26 | |
| 8 | GIF Sundsvall | 26 | 11 | 4 | 11 | 44 | 46 | −2 | 26 | |
| 9 | Brynäs IF | 26 | 8 | 10 | 8 | 32 | 34 | −2 | 26 | |
| 10 | Vasalunds IF | 26 | 9 | 8 | 9 | 34 | 39 | −5 | 26 | |
| 11 | Nyköpings BIS | 26 | 8 | 9 | 9 | 37 | 34 | +3 | 25 | |
| 12 | IK Sleipner | 26 | 11 | 3 | 12 | 38 | 36 | +2 | 25 | Relegation to Division 3 |
| 13 | KB Karlskoga | 26 | 7 | 4 | 15 | 37 | 43 | −6 | 18 | Relegation to Division 3 |
| 14 | Lycksele IF | 26 | 5 | 3 | 18 | 36 | 74 | −38 | 13 | Relegation to Division 3 |

=== Södra ===
| Pos | Team | Pld | W | D | L | GF | GA | GD | Pts | Promotion or relegation |
|---|---|---|---|---|---|---|---|---|---|---|
| 1 | Åtvidabergs FF | 26 | 16 | 8 | 2 | 45 | 11 | +34 | 40 | Promotion to Allsvenskan |
| 2 | Örgryte IS | 26 | 13 | 8 | 5 | 56 | 36 | +20 | 34 | |
| 3 | Alvesta GIF | 26 | 11 | 7 | 8 | 43 | 40 | +3 | 29 | |
| 4 | Mjällby AIF | 26 | 9 | 10 | 7 | 37 | 38 | −1 | 28 | |
| 5 | Helsingborgs IF | 26 | 10 | 7 | 9 | 35 | 32 | +3 | 27 | |
| 6 | IS Halmia | 26 | 8 | 11 | 7 | 37 | 36 | +1 | 27 | |
| 7 | Norrby IF | 26 | 9 | 8 | 9 | 37 | 39 | −2 | 26 | |
| 8 | IFK Hässleholm | 26 | 10 | 6 | 10 | 39 | 49 | −10 | 26 | |
| 9 | GAIS | 26 | 8 | 8 | 10 | 34 | 29 | +5 | 24 | |
| 10 | Jönköpings Södra IF | 26 | 7 | 10 | 9 | 35 | 45 | −10 | 24 | |
| 11 | IFK Malmö | 26 | 6 | 11 | 9 | 31 | 37 | −6 | 23 | |
| 12 | Råå IF | 26 | 8 | 6 | 12 | 37 | 34 | +3 | 22 | Relegation to Division 3 |
| 13 | IFK Ulricehamn | 26 | 6 | 7 | 13 | 29 | 40 | −11 | 19 | Relegation to Division 3 |
| 14 | Grimsås IF | 26 | 2 | 11 | 13 | 12 | 41 | −29 | 15 | Relegation to Division 3 |
