= 1962 Division 2 (Swedish football) =

Swedish League Division 2
- Season: 1962
- Champions: IFK Holmsund; AIK; IS Halmia; Landskrona BoIS
- Promoted: IS Halmia; AIK
- Relegated: Bodens BK; IFK Kalix; Skellefteå IF; Karlstads BIK; IK Sirius; Köpings IS; Tidaholms GIF; Billingsfors IK; Kungshamns IF; Råå IF; IK Sleipner; Tomelilla IF

Statistics of Swedish football Division 2 for the 1962 season.

== League standings ==
=== Norrland ===
Pos	Team	Pld	W	D	L	GF	GA	GD	Pts	Qualification or relegation
1	IFK Holmsund	18	12	3	3	42	7	+35	27	Playoffs for promotion to Allsvenskan
2	Lycksele IF	18	11	4	3	32	18	+14	26	
3	Skellefteå AIK	18	9	4	5	25	19	+6	22	
4	GIF Sundsvall	18	9	3	6	45	26	+19	21	
5	IFK Luleå	18	8	3	7	31	28	+3	19	
6	Söderhamns IF	18	7	3	8	19	27	−8	17	
7	Gimonäs CK	18	7	2	9	27	36	−9	16	
8	Bodens BK	18	3	7	8	23	36	−13	13	Relegation to Division 3
9	IFK Kalix	18	4	3	11	16	31	−15	11	Relegation to Division 3
10	Skellefteå IF	18	1	6	11	10	42	−32	8	Relegation to Division 3

=== Svealand ===
Pos	Team	Pld	W	D	L	GF	GA	GD	Pts	Qualification or relegation
1	AIK	22	16	5	1	66	19	+47	37	Playoffs for promotion to Allsvenskan
2	Sandvikens IF	22	16	0	6	64	28	+36	32	
3	Sundbybergs IK	22	10	6	6	45	28	+17	26	
4	IK Brage	22	10	6	6	29	30	−1	26	
5	IFK Eskilstuna	22	11	1	10	51	45	+6	23	
6	IFK Stockholm	22	10	2	10	46	41	+5	22	
7	Sandvikens AIK	22	10	2	10	37	48	−11	22	
8	Avesta AIK	22	7	4	11	34	49	−15	18	
9	IFK Kumla	22	7	4	11	33	49	−16	18	
10	Karlstads BIK	22	8	1	13	47	53	−6	17	Relegation to Division 3
11	IK Sirius	22	6	2	14	37	55	−18	14	Relegation to Division 3
12	Köpings IS	22	4	1	17	22	66	−44	9	Relegation to Division 3

=== Västra Götaland ===
Pos	Team	Pld	W	D	L	GF	GA	GD	Pts	Qualification or relegation
1	IS Halmia	22	18	4	0	67	23	+44	40	Playoffs for promotion to Allsvenskan
2	GAIS	22	13	4	5	39	24	+15	30	
3	Norrby IF	22	10	3	9	54	42	+12	23	
4	IK Oddevold	22	10	2	10	39	37	+2	22	
5	Redbergslids IK	22	10	2	10	42	44	−2	22	
6	Halmstads BK	22	9	3	10	35	38	−3	21	
7	SK Sifhälla	22	7	6	9	37	39	−2	20	
8	Jönköpings Södra IF	22	8	4	10	34	38	−4	20	
9	Varbergs BoIS	22	9	1	12	36	41	−5	19	
10	Tidaholms GIF	22	8	2	12	23	36	−13	18	Relegation to Division 3
11	Billingsfors IK	22	6	4	12	30	52	−22	16	Relegation to Division 3
12	Kungshamns IF	22	6	1	15	41	63	−22	13	Relegation to Division 3

=== Östra Götaland ===
Pos	Team	Pld	W	D	L	GF	GA	GD	Pts	Qualification or relegation
1	Landskrona BoIS	22	13	5	4	53	24	+29	31	Playoffs for promotion to Allsvenskan
2	IFK Kristianstad	22	13	5	4	64	41	+23	31	
3	Åtvidabergs FF	22	12	7	3	46	27	+19	31	
4	Östers IF	22	10	6	6	39	27	+12	26	
5	BK Derby	22	11	3	8	44	38	+6	25	
6	Saltö BK	22	9	5	8	39	34	+5	23	
7	Malmö BI	22	9	2	11	38	40	−2	20	
8	Motala AIF	22	6	8	8	26	29	−3	20	
9	Kalmar FF	22	7	5	10	38	41	−3	19	
10	Råå IF	22	7	3	12	29	36	−7	17	Relegation to Division 3
11	IK Sleipner	22	4	4	14	20	52	−32	12	Relegation to Division 3
12	Tomelilla IF	22	3	3	16	29	76	−47	9	Relegation to Division 3

== Allsvenskan promotion playoffs ==
Pos	Team	Pld	W	D	L	GF	GA	GD	Pts	Promotion
1	IS Halmia	3	2	0	1	6	2	+4	4	Promotion to Allsvenskan
2	AIK	3	2	0	1	6	4	+2	4	Promotion to Allsvenskan
3	Landskrona BoIS	3	2	0	1	6	5	+1	4	
4	IFK Holmsund	3	0	0	3	2	9	−7	0	
