= Division 2 (Swedish football) =

Association football league in Sweden

Swedish division 2
- Founded: 2006; 20 years ago
- Country: Sweden
- Confederation: UEFA
- Divisions: 6
- Number of clubs: 84
- Level on pyramid: 4
- Promotion to: Ettan
- Relegation to: Division 3
- Domestic cup: Svenska Cupen
- Current: 2025 Division 2

Division 2 is the fourth level in the league system of Swedish football and comprises 84 Swedish football teams. Division 2 had status as the official second level from 1928 to 1986 but was replaced by Division 1 in 1987. It then had status as the official third level until 2005 but was replaced again by the recreated Division 1 in 2006.

== Overview ==
In the division, there are 84 clubs which are divided in six groups of 14 teams each representing a geographical area. During the course of a season (starting in April and ending in October) each club plays the others twice, once at their home stadium and once at that of their opponents, for a total of 26 games. At the end of each season, the two lowest placed teams of each group are relegated to division 3 and the twelve winning teams from the twelve division 3 leagues are promoted in their place while the third lowest placed teams in the division 2 leagues plays promotion/relegation play-offs against the twelve second placed teams in division 3. The top team in each division 2 group is promoted to division 1 and the three lowest placed teams from each division 1 league are relegated in their place.

== Administration ==
The Swedish Football Association (SvFF) is responsible for the administration of division 2.

== Historical context ==
Division 2 is the fourth-highest division in Swedish Football. It currently comprises six regional leagues which may show some small changes to their titles year on year reflecting the changing geographical distribution of clubs. The six sections for the 2014 season cover Norrland, Norra Svealand, Södra Svealand, Norra Götaland, Västra Götaland and Östra Götaland.

The name of division 2 has been around since 1924/25 season when there were 5 sections titled Uppsvenskan, Mellansvenskan, Östsvenskan, Västsvenskan and Sydsvenskan which were run on an unofficial basis. Division 2 became official in 1928/29 as the second tier of Swedish football with 2 sections being created – Norra and Södra – with a total of 20 teams.

In 1932/33 division 2 was expanded into 4 sections covering Norra, Östra, Västra and Södra. This format continued until the end of the 1946/47 season. For the 1947/48 season a 2 section structure was restored comprising the Nordöstra and Sydvästra sections. In 1953/54 a section representing the northern clubs in Sweden was introduced for the first time known as Norrland. The other two sections were titled Svealand and Götaland. In 1955/56 it was decided that Götaland should have 2 sections. This provided division 2 with 4 sections covering Norrland, Svealand, Östra Götaland and Västra Götaland.

In 1972 the structure reverted to 3 sections titled Norra, Mellersta and Södra. This was short-lived and in 1974 two sections covering Norra and Södra were consolidated. This system continued until the end of the 1986 season when the competition became division 1.

From 1987 onwards division 2 became the third highest league in Swedish football and this continued until 2005. The new division initially had 4 sections titled Norra, Mellersta, Östra and Västra. In 1993 it was divided into 6 sections titled Norrland, Östra Svealand, Västra Svealand, Östra Götaland, Västra Götaland and Södra Götaland.

In 2006 division 2 became Sweden's fourth highest division with the introduction of division 1 below the Superettan.

== Current clubs ==
Clubs for the 2026 season:

=== Norrland ===
- Bodens BK
- Fränsta IK
- Friska Viljor FC
- Gottne IF
- Kubikenborgs IF
- Lucksta IF
- IFK Luleå
- IFK Östersund
- Skellefteå FF
- Storfors AIK
- Täfteå IK
- Team TG FF
- Umeå FC Akademi
- IFK Umeå

=== Norra Svealand ===
- Ängby IF
- Bollstanäs SK
- Enskede IK
- Falu BS
- IK Franke
- FC Gute
- Helges IF
- Korsnäs IF
- Kungsängens IF
- IFK Lidingö
- Skiljebo SK
- Sunnersta AIF
- Täby FK
- Viggbyholms IK

=== Södra Svealand ===
- IF Eker Örebro
- FoC Farsta
- Fittja IF
- BK Forward
- IFK Haninge
- Karlslunds IF
- Nacka FC
- Nyköpings BIS
- Örebro Syrianska IF
- Rågsveds IF
- IK Sleipner
- Smedby AIS
- IF Sylvia
- Syrianska FC

=== Norra Götaland ===
- Ahlafors IF
- Grebbestads IF
- Herrestads AIF
- Husqvarna FF
- IF Karlstad Fotbollsutveckling
- IFK Kumla
- Lidköpings FK
- Motala AIF
- Skara FC
- IFK Skövde
- Stenungsunds IF
- IK Tord
- Vänersborgs FK
- Vänersborgs IF

=== Västra Götaland ===
- Åstorps FF
- BK Astrio
- IF Böljan Falkenberg
- Dalstorp IF
- Galtabäcks BK
- Hestrafors IF
- Jonsereds IF
- IK Kongahälla
- Landvetter IS
- Lindome GIF
- Onsala BK
- Qviding FIF
- Torslanda IK
- Västra Frölunda IF

=== Södra Götaland ===
- IFK Berga
- IFK Karlshamn
- FK Karlskrona
- Lilla Torg FF
- Linero IF
- Nosaby IF
- Oskarshamns AIK
- Österlen FF
- Räppe GoIF
- Sölvesborgs GIF
- Staffanstorp United FC
- Torns IF
- IFK Trelleborg
- Växjö Norra IF

== Seasons ==
=== Second tier ===
- 1924–25
- 1925–26
- 1926–27
- 1927–28
- 1928–29
- 1929–30
- 1930–31
- 1931–32
- 1932–33
- 1933–34
- 1934–35
- 1935–36
- 1936–37
- 1937–38
- 1938–39
- 1939–40
- 1940–41
- 1941–42
- 1942–43
- 1943–44
- 1944–45
- 1945–46
- 1946–47
- 1947–48
- 1948–49
- 1949–50
- 1950–51
- 1951–52
- 1952–53
- 1953–54
- 1954–55
- 1955–56
- 1956–57
- 1957–58
- 1959
- 1960
- 1961
- 1962
- 1963
- 1964
- 1965
- 1966
- 1967
- 1968
- 1969
- 1970
- 1971
- 1972
- 1973
- 1974
- 1975
- 1976
- 1977
- 1978
- 1979
- 1980
- 1981
- 1982
- 1983
- 1984
- 1985
- 1986

=== Third tier ===
- 1987
- 1988
- 1989
- 1990
- 1991
- 1992
- 1993
- 1994
- 1995
- 1996
- 1997
- 1998
- 1999
- 2000
- 2001
- 2002
- 2003
- 2004
- 2005

=== Fourth tier ===
- 2006
- 2007
- 2008
- 2009
- 2010
- 2011
- 2012
- 2013
- 2014
- 2015
- 2016
- 2017
- 2018
- 2019
- 2020
- 2021
- 2022
- 2023
- 2024
- 2025
- 2026

== Player of the year awards ==
Ever since 2003 the online bookmaker Unibet have given out awards at the end of the season to the best players in division 2. The recipients are decided by a jury of sportsjournalists, coaches and football experts.

=== 2003 ===
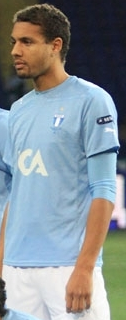
Mathias Ranégie who was voted best forward in 2006 went on to become the 2011 Allsvenskan top goalscorer and then signed with Serie A club Udinese in 2012.

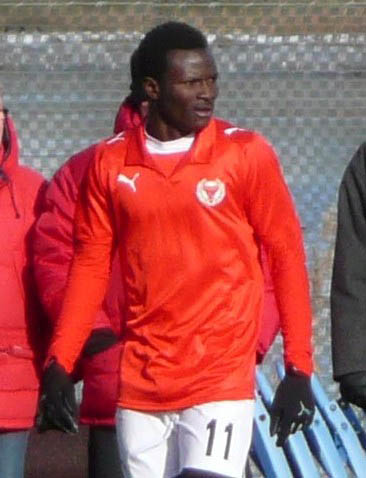
Nigerian 2007 winner Abiola Dauda was signed by Allsvenskan club Kalmar FF after his successful season and was one of the top scorers in the 2012 Allsvenskan.

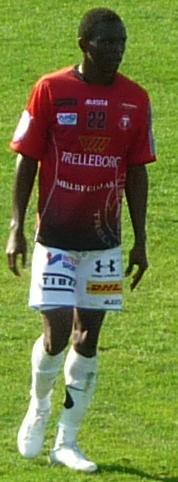
The best midfielder of 2010, Ibrahim Koroma, has over 10 caps for the Sierra Leone national football team.

Position	Player	Club
GK	(Sweden) Jonnie Fedel	Höllvikens GIF
DF	(Sweden) Erik Skördåker	Jönköpings Södra IF
MF	(Kenya) Tom Juma	Friska Viljor FC
FW	(Sweden) Jimmy Rajala	IK Brage

=== 2004 ===
Position	Player	Club
GK	(Sweden) Sebastian Karlsson	Degerfors IF
DF	(Sweden) Markus Senften	Mjällby AIF
MF	(Sweden) Magnus Henrysson	Umeå FC
FW	(Sweden) Andreas Tegström	Husqvarna FF

=== 2005 ===
Position	Player	Club
GK	(Sweden) Rickard Claesson	Sandareds IF
DF	(Sweden) Björn Bjersing	Umeå FC
MF	(Sweden) Aram Ibrahim	Jönköpings Södra IF
FW	(Sweden) Johan Pettersson	IK Sirius

=== 2006 ===
Position	Player	Club
GK	(Sweden) Gerhard Andersson	IK Brage
DF	(Sweden) André Grim	IFK Timrå
MF	(Sweden) Mikael Andersson	IK Sleipner
FW	(Sweden) Mathias Ranégie	Lärje-Angereds IF

=== 2007 ===
Position	Player	Club
GK	(Sweden) Ambjörn Lennartsson	Myresjö IF
DF	(Sweden) Lars-Henrik Enered	Eskilstuna City
MF	(Sweden) Johan Blomberg	Lunds BK
FW	(Nigeria) Abiola Dauda	Sölvesborgs GoIF

=== 2008 ===
Position	Player	Club
GK	(Sweden) Martin Sundström	Brynäs IF
DF	(Sweden) Haisem Ismail	Skiljebo SK
MF	(Sweden) Carlos Gaete Moggia	Hammarby TFF
FW	(Sweden) Robin Arestav	Mariehem SK

=== 2009 ===
Position	Player	Club
GK	(Sweden) Johannes Hopf	Hammarby TFF
DF	(Bosnia and Herzegovina) Haris Devic	Bodens BK
MF	(Sweden) Joakim Persson	Lunds BK
FW	(Bosnia and Herzegovina) Nedim Halilović	Dalkurd FF

=== 2010 ===
Position	Player	Club
GK	(Sweden) Modou Jawo	IK Frej
DF	(Sierra Leone) Ibrahim Koroma	Motala AIF
MF	(North Macedonia) Goran Zdravkov	Skellefteå FF
FW	(Sweden) Andreas Grahm	VMA IK

=== 2011 ===
Position	Player	Club
GK	(Georgia (country)) Besarion Kodalaev	Östersunds FK
DF	(Sweden) Pontus Jakobsson	Örebro SK Ungdom
MF	(Sweden) Armin Pasagic	IFK Klagshamn
FW	(Sweden) Sonny Karlsson	Utsiktens BK

=== 2012 ===
Position	Player	Club
GK	(Sweden) Jonas Käck	IS Halmia
DF	(Sweden) Pontus Nordenberg	Nyköpings BIS
MF	(Sweden) Pontus Silfver	Hudiksvalls FF
FW	(Sweden) Ahmad Khreis	Selånger FK

=== 2013 ===
Position	Player	Club
GK	(Sweden) Fredrik Enberg	Skellefteå FF
DF	(Sweden) Sebastian Starkenberg	Motala AIF
MF	(Sweden) Imer Beqiri	IFK Uddevalla
FW	(Sweden) Mathias Strinäs	Norrby IF

=== 2014 ===
Position	Player	Club
GK	(Sweden) Simon Lundgren	Akropolis IF
DF	(Sweden) William Olausson	Piteå IF
MF	(Sweden) Muktar Ahmed	FK Karlskrona
FW	(Sweden) Fredrik Notice	Södertälje FK
