= 1953–54 Division 2 (Swedish football) =

Swedish League Division 2
- Season: 1953–54
- Champions: Sandvikens AIK; Hammarby IF
- Promoted: Sandvikens AIK; Hammarby IF
- Relegated: GIF Sundsvall; Sollefteå GIF; Ljunga IF; Västerås IK; Falu BS; Avesta AIK; BK Häcken; Örgryte IS; Redbergslids IK

Statistics of Swedish football Division 2 for the 1953–54 season.

== League standings ==
=== Norrland ===
Pos	Team	Pld	W	D	L	GF	GA	GD	Pts	Promotion or relegation
1	Sandvikens AIK	18	12	3	3	43	27	+16	27	Promoted to Allsvenskan
2	Ljusne AIK	18	10	5	3	46	28	+18	25	
3	Lycksele IF	18	10	3	5	41	23	+18	23	
4	Skellefteå AIK	18	8	5	5	47	32	+15	21	
5	IFK Östersund	18	7	6	5	39	29	+10	20	
6	Fagerviks GF	18	9	2	7	39	36	+3	20	
7	IF Älgarna	18	7	5	6	31	25	+6	19	
8	GIF Sundsvall	18	3	4	11	27	42	−15	10	Relegated to Division 3
9	Sollefteå GIF	18	3	3	12	30	58	−28	9	Relegated to Division 3
10	Ljunga IF	18	1	4	13	24	67	−43	6	Relegated to Division 3

=== Svealand ===
Pos	Team	Pld	W	D	L	GF	GA	GD	Pts	Promotion or relegation
1	Hammarby IF	18	13	5	0	47	19	+28	31	Promoted to Allsvenskan
2	Örebro SK	18	13	2	3	45	17	+28	28	
3	IFK Eskilstuna	18	11	3	4	42	25	+17	25	
4	IK Brage	18	9	2	7	46	40	+6	20	
5	Karlskoga IF	18	9	2	7	27	34	−7	20	
6	IK City	18	5	4	9	46	43	+3	14	
7	Västerås SK	18	4	5	9	24	37	−13	13	
8	Västerås IK	18	4	4	10	24	40	−16	12	Relegated to Division 3
9	Falu BS	18	4	3	11	29	45	−16	11	Relegated to Division 3
10	Avesta AIK	18	2	2	14	22	52	−30	6	Relegated to Division 3

=== Götaland ===
Pos	Team	Pld	W	D	L	GF	GA	GD	Pts	Promotion or relegation
1	Halmstads BK	26	20	4	2	79	25	+54	44	Promoted to Allsvenskan
2	IK Sleipner	26	11	10	5	53	42	+11	32	
3	Norrby IF	26	12	6	8	54	47	+7	30	
4	IFK Malmö	26	13	4	9	37	30	+7	30	
5	Landskrona BoIS	26	12	5	9	49	41	+8	29	
6	BK Derby	26	12	5	9	47	40	+7	29	
7	Åtvidabergs FF	26	12	2	12	49	50	−1	26	
8	Råå IF	26	10	6	10	38	40	−2	26	
9	Höganäs BK	26	10	5	11	34	40	−6	25	
10	IFK Trelleborg	26	10	4	12	41	51	−10	24	
11	Motala AIF	26	9	6	11	31	47	−16	24	
12	BK Häcken	26	9	4	13	34	41	−7	22	Relegated to Division 3
13	Örgryte IS	26	7	5	14	41	52	−11	19	Relegated to Division 3
14	Redbergslids IK	26	1	2	23	24	65	−41	4	Relegated to Division 3
