= 1952–53 Division 2 (Swedish football) =

Swedish League Division 2
- Season: 1952–53
- Champions: Sandvikens IF; Kalmar FF
- Promoted: Sandvikens IF; Kalmar FF
- Relegated: Karlstads BIK; IF Viken; Lunds BK; IS Halmia

Statistics of Swedish football Division 2 for the 1952–53 season.

== League standings ==
=== Division 2 Nordöstra 1952–53 ===
Teams from a large part of northern Sweden, approximately above the province of Medelpad, were not allowed to play in the national league system until the 1953–54 season, and a championship was instead played to decide the best team in Norrland.

Pos	Team	Pld	W	D	L	GF	GA	GD	Pts	Promotion or relegation
1	Sandvikens IF	18	13	2	3	51	13	+38	28	Promoted to Allsvenskan
2	IK City	18	12	4	2	48	16	+32	28	League transfer within league level
3	Motala AIF	18	11	3	4	38	28	+10	25	League transfer within league level
4	Åtvidabergs FF	18	11	1	6	40	23	+17	23	League transfer within league level
5	BK Derby	18	7	4	7	25	28	−3	18	League transfer within league level
6	Hammarby IF	18	7	3	8	25	23	+2	17	League transfer within league level
7	Västerås SK	18	5	3	10	23	41	−18	13	League transfer within league level
8	IK Brage	18	5	3	10	25	47	−22	13	League transfer within league level
9	Karlstads BIK	18	2	4	12	19	42	−23	8	Relegated to Division 3
10	IF Viken	18	3	1	14	20	53	−33	7	Relegated to Division 3

=== Division 2 Sydvästra 1952–53 ===
Pos	Team	Pld	W	D	L	GF	GA	GD	Pts	Promotion or relegation
1	Kalmar FF	18	11	2	5	31	24	+7	24	Promoted to Allsvenskan
2	Höganäs BK	18	8	5	5	33	22	+11	21	League transfer within league level
3	Norrby IF	18	6	8	4	31	20	+11	20	League transfer within league level
4	Halmstads BK	18	8	4	6	35	27	+8	20	League transfer within league level
5	Örgryte IS	18	8	4	6	37	33	+4	20	League transfer within league level
6	Råå IF	18	8	4	6	26	26	0	20	League transfer within league level
7	BK Häcken	18	8	4	6	35	36	−1	20	League transfer within league level
8	IFK Trelleborg	18	6	3	9	24	32	−8	15	League transfer within league level
9	Lunds BK	18	6	2	10	25	31	−6	14	Relegated to Division 3
10	IS Halmia	18	1	4	13	20	46	−26	6	Relegated to Division 3
