= 1985 Division 2 (Swedish football) =

Swedish football Division

Swedish League Division 2
- Season: 1985
- Champions: Djurgårdens IF; IF Elfsborg
- Promoted: Djurgårdens IF; IF Elfsborg
- Relegated: Karlslunds IF; Tyresö FF; Falu BS; Jönköpings Södra IF; IFK Malmö; IS Halmia

Statistics of Swedish football Division 2 in season 1985.

== League standings ==
=== Division 2 Norra 1985 ===
Pos	Team	Pld	W	D	L	GF	GA	GD	Pts
1	Djurgårdens IF	26	16	8	2	50	20	+30	40
2	Västerås SK	26	18	2	6	64	21	+43	38
3	Gefle IF	26	14	7	5	41	23	+18	35
4	Örebro SK	26	9	10	7	38	33	+5	28
5	IFK Eskilstuna	26	10	8	8	33	38	−5	28
6	Luleå FF	26	10	7	9	47	39	+8	27
7	IF Brommapojkarna	26	9	8	9	36	33	+3	26
8	Sandvikens IF	26	9	8	9	30	31	−1	26
9	Vasalunds IF	26	8	9	9	43	36	+7	25
10	IFK Västerås	26	9	7	10	32	31	+1	25
11	Ope IF	26	8	7	11	25	38	−13	23
12	Karlslunds IF	26	8	5	13	24	41	−17	21
13	Tyresö FF	26	6	7	13	25	42	−17	19
14	Falu BS	26	0	3	23	12	74	−62	3

=== Division 2 Södra 1985 ===
Pos	Team	Pld	W	D	L	GF	GA	GD	Pts
1	IF Elfsborg	26	17	7	2	54	14	+40	41
2	GAIS	26	16	5	5	58	26	+32	37
3	Åtvidabergs FF	26	15	5	6	51	27	+24	35
4	Helsingborgs IF	26	10	9	7	37	32	+5	29
5	Norrby IF	26	11	6	9	32	39	−7	28
6	Västra Frölunda IF	26	9	8	9	38	30	+8	26
7	Kalmar AIK	26	7	12	7	40	34	+6	26
8	BK Häcken	26	11	4	11	50	46	+4	26
9	Markaryds IF	26	7	10	9	29	39	−10	24
10	Degerfors IF	26	8	7	11	40	43	−3	23
11	Myresjö IF	26	8	6	12	42	53	−11	22
12	Jönköpings Södra IF	26	7	6	13	32	38	−6	20
13	IFK Malmö	26	4	8	14	17	43	−26	16
14	IS Halmia	26	3	5	18	21	77	−56	11
