= 1951–52 Division 2 (Swedish football) =

Swedish League Division 2
- Season: 1951–52
- Champions: AIK; IFK Malmö
- Promoted: AIK; IFK Malmö
- Relegated: Sandvikens AIK; Ludvika FfI; Landskrona BoIS; Ronneby BK

Statistics of Swedish football Division 2 for the 1951–52 season.

== League standings ==
=== Division 2 Nordöstra 1951–52 ===
Teams from a large part of northern Sweden, approximately above the province of Medelpad, were not allowed to play in the national league system until the 1953–54 season, and a championship was instead played to decide the best team in Norrland.

Pos	Team	Pld	W	D	L	GF	GA	GD	Pts	Promotion or relegation
1	AIK	18	15	2	1	56	21	+35	32	Promoted to Allsvenskan
2	Karlstads BIK	18	7	6	5	30	26	+4	20	
3	Sandvikens IF	18	7	6	5	28	25	+3	20	
4	Hammarby IF	18	6	7	5	35	28	+7	19	
5	Motala AIF	18	7	5	6	33	36	−3	19	
6	IF Viken	18	5	6	7	33	40	−7	16	
7	IK City	18	6	3	9	27	34	−7	15	
8	IK Brage	18	4	6	8	27	31	−4	14	
9	Sandvikens AIK	18	6	2	10	34	45	−11	14	Relegated to Division 3
10	Ludvika FfI	18	4	3	11	22	39	−17	11	Relegated to Division 3

=== Division 2 Sydvästra 1951–52 ===
Pos	Team	Pld	W	D	L	GF	GA	GD	Pts	Promotion or relegation
1	IFK Malmö	18	13	2	3	43	22	+21	28	Promoted to Allsvenskan
2	Halmstads BK	18	8	5	5	40	28	+12	21	
3	Norrby IF	18	9	2	7	34	27	+7	20	
4	Lunds BK	18	8	3	7	35	32	+3	19	
5	BK Häcken	18	7	4	7	26	27	−1	18	
6	Kalmar FF	18	7	3	8	26	22	+4	17	
7	IS Halmia	18	7	3	8	26	31	−5	17	
8	Höganäs BK	18	7	2	9	23	30	−7	16	
9	Landskrona BoIS	18	5	4	9	24	30	−6	14	Relegated to Division 3
10	Ronneby BK	18	4	2	12	24	52	−28	10	Relegated to Division 3
