= 1979 Division 2 (Swedish football) =

Swedish League Division 2
- Season: 1979
- Champions: IK Brage; Mjällby AIF
- Promoted: IK Brage; Mjällby AIF
- Relegated: Enköpings SK; IK Sirius; Gammelstads IF; Norrby IF; BK Derby; Alvesta GIF

Statistics of Swedish football Division 2 in season 1979.

== League standings ==
=== Norra ===
Pos	Team	Pld	W	D	L	GF	GA	GD	Pts	Promotion or relegation
1	IK Brage	26	20	3	3	50	15	+35	43	Promotion to Allsvenskan
2	Örebro SK	26	17	5	4	66	29	+37	39	
3	Degerfors IF	26	12	8	6	48	36	+12	32	
4	Västerås SK	26	13	2	11	44	31	+13	28	
5	Vasalunds IF	26	10	8	8	35	32	+3	28	
6	Sandvikens IF	26	12	4	10	36	34	+2	28	
7	IFK Eskilstuna	26	10	8	8	43	42	+1	28	
8	GIF Sundsvall	26	10	4	12	41	40	+1	24	
9	Hudiksvalls ABK	26	9	6	11	26	44	−18	24	
10	Nyköpings BIS	26	7	7	12	30	32	−2	21	
11	IFK Västerås	26	6	9	11	23	33	−10	21	
12	Enköpings SK	26	6	7	13	22	44	−22	19	Relegation to Division 3
13	IK Sirius	26	6	5	15	29	42	−13	17	Relegation to Division 3
14	Gammelstads IF	26	3	6	17	30	69	−39	12	Relegation to Division 3

=== Södra ===
Pos	Team	Pld	W	D	L	GF	GA	GD	Pts	Promotion or relegation
1	Mjällby AIF	26	16	6	4	59	27	+32	38	Promotion to Allsvenskan
2	Helsingborgs IF	26	13	7	6	40	31	+9	33	
3	BK Häcken	26	11	10	5	46	27	+19	32	
4	IFK Hässleholm	26	11	6	9	42	36	+6	28	
5	Jönköpings Södra IF	26	10	8	8	35	30	+5	28	
6	Grimsås IF	26	10	7	9	37	35	+2	27	
7	IFK Malmö	26	9	9	8	26	32	−6	27	
8	IK Sleipner	26	10	6	10	49	44	+5	26	
9	Örgryte IS	26	9	6	11	45	46	−1	24	
10	Kalmar AIK	26	10	4	12	28	38	−10	24	
11	GAIS	26	8	7	11	29	37	−8	23	
12	Norrby IF	26	7	7	12	33	49	−16	21	Relegation to Division 3
13	BK Derby	26	6	8	12	39	43	−4	20	Relegation to Division 3
14	Alvesta GIF	26	3	7	16	32	65	−33	13	Relegation to Division 3
