= 1981 Division 2 (Swedish football) =

Swedish League Division 2
- Season: 1981
- Champions: IFK Eskilstuna; BK Häcken
- Relegated: Karlslunds IF; Spånga IS; GIF Sundsvall; IFK Hässleholm; Grimsås IF; GAIS; Degerfors IF; Jönköping Södra IF

Statistics of Swedish football Division 2 in season 1981.

== League standings ==
=== Division 2 Norra 1981 ===
Pos	Team	Pld	W	D	L	GF	GA	GD	Pts
1	IFK Eskilstuna	26	13	9	4	44	27	+17	35
2	Örebro SK	26	11	8	7	50	32	+18	30
3	Vasalunds IF	26	10	10	6	47	40	+7	30
4	Flens IF	26	12	6	8	43	41	+2	30
5	Västerås SK	26	10	10	6	37	36	+1	30
6	Sandvikens IF	26	10	9	7	38	24	+14	29
7	Karlstad BK	26	12	5	9	44	43	+1	29
8	Ope IF	26	10	8	8	35	28	+7	28
9	Gefle IF/Brynäs	26	10	7	9	40	41	−1	27
10	IFK Västerås	26	7	11	8	31	28	+3	25
11	Degerfors IF	26	7	8	11	39	41	−2	22
12	Karlslunds IF	26	5	8	13	33	48	−15	18
13	Spånga IS	26	6	5	15	29	55	−26	17
14	GIF Sundsvall	26	2	9	15	21	47	−26	13

=== Division 2 Södra 1981 ===
Pos	Team	Pld	W	D	L	GF	GA	GD	Pts
1	BK Häcken	26	14	9	3	44	28	+16	37
2	IS Halmia	26	11	9	6	44	30	+14	31
3	Trelleborgs FF	26	12	5	9	41	30	+11	29
4	Karlskrona AIF	26	9	11	6	35	28	+7	29
5	Mjällby AIF	26	10	8	8	34	31	+3	28
6	Landskrona BoIS	26	10	7	9	30	26	+4	27
7	Västra Frölunda IF	26	8	11	7	29	28	+1	27
8	Helsingborgs IF	26	9	9	8	32	33	−1	27
9	IK Sleipner	26	9	8	9	32	41	−9	26
10	IFK Malmö	26	5	14	7	33	31	+2	24
11	Jönköpings Södra IF	26	7	9	10	39	45	−6	23
12	IFK Hässleholm	26	6	10	10	30	43	−13	22
13	Grimsås IF	26	6	6	14	29	42	−13	18
14	GAIS	26	3	10	13	22	38	−16	16
