= 1980 Division 2 (Swedish football) =

Swedish League Division 2
- Season: 1980
- Champions: AIK; Örgryte IS
- Promoted: AIK; Örgryte IS
- Relegated: BK Forward; IF Brommapojkarna; Hudiksvalls ABK; IFK Kristianstad; Kalmar AIK; Nyköpings BIS

Statistics of Swedish football Division 2 in season 1980.

== League standings ==
=== Division 2 Norra 1980 ===
Pos	Team	Pld	W	D	L	GF	GA	GD	Pts	Promotion or relegation
1	AIK	26	18	5	3	60	19	+41	41	Promotion to Allsvenskan
2	Örebro SK	26	16	6	4	52	14	+38	38	
3	Vasalunds IF	26	12	9	5	39	30	+9	33	
4	Karlstads BK	26	14	4	8	32	31	+1	32	
5	Västerås SK	26	13	5	8	45	40	+5	31	
6	IFK Västerås	26	9	9	8	35	30	+5	27	
7	IFK Eskilstuna	26	9	9	8	32	32	0	27	
8	Degerfors IF	26	9	7	10	37	39	−2	25	
9	GIF Sundsvall	26	6	11	9	28	34	−6	23	
10	Gefle IF/Brynäs	26	7	8	11	29	36	−7	22	
11	Sandvikens IF	26	6	10	10	25	34	−9	22	
12	BK Forward	26	4	9	13	26	44	−18	17	Relegation to Division 3
13	IF Brommapojkarna	26	6	4	16	35	55	−20	16	Relegation to Division 3
14	Hudiksvalls ABK	26	2	6	18	26	63	−37	10	Relegation to Division 3

=== Division 2 Södra 1980 ===
Pos	Team	Pld	W	D	L	GF	GA	GD	Pts	Promotion or relegation
1	Örgryte IS	26	12	7	7	45	32	+13	31 (Note: Since both GAIS and Örgryte had the same goaldifference at the end of the season, the team that would have the promotion spot had to be decided through most goals scored. Thus, Örgryte was promoted.)	Promotion to Allsvenskan
2	GAIS	26	13	5	8	35	22	+13	31	
3	IFK Malmö	26	11	9	6	30	25	+5	31	
4	Grimsås IF	26	11	7	8	29	24	+5	29	
5	Helsingborgs IF	26	10	8	8	33	23	+10	28	
6	BK Häcken	26	12	4	10	39	31	+8	28	
7	Jönköpings Södra IF	26	11	6	9	34	31	+3	28	
8	IS Halmia	26	11	5	10	30	28	+2	27	
9	Karlskrona AIF	26	10	7	9	27	29	−2	27	
10	IFK Hässleholm	26	8	9	9	26	33	−7	25	
11	IK Sleipner	26	8	8	10	26	30	−4	24	
12	IFK Kristianstad	26	9	6	11	28	36	−8	24	Relegation to Division 3
13	Kalmar AIK	26	1	14	11	12	32	−20	16	Relegation to Division 3
14	Nyköpings BIS	26	5	5	16	20	38	−18	15	Relegation to Division 3
