= 1984 Division 2 (Swedish football) =

Swedish League Division 2
- Season: 1984
- Champions: Örebro SK; Trelleborgs FF
- Promoted: Mjällby AIF; Trelleborgs FF
- Relegated: IFK Sundsvall; Skellefteå AIK; Nyköpings BIS; Landskrona BoIS; Lunds BK; Grimsås IF

Statistics of Swedish football Division 2 in season 1984.

== League standings ==
=== Division 2 Norra 1984 ===
Pos	Team	Pld	W	D	L	GF	GA	GD	Pts
1	Örebro SK	26	14	8	4	47	17	+30	36
2	Åtvidabergs FF	26	12	12	2	35	14	+21	36
3	Djurgårdens IF	26	12	11	3	28	13	+15	35
4	IF Brommapojkarna	26	14	6	6	36	15	+21	34
5	IFK Västerås	26	8	10	8	29	30	−1	26
6	Västerås SK	26	8	8	10	33	30	+3	24
7	Vasalunds IF	26	9	6	11	27	28	−1	24
8	Karlslunds IF	26	7	10	9	23	33	−10	24
9	IFK Eskilstuna	26	5	13	8	25	39	−14	23
10	Degerfors IF	26	7	8	11	33	37	−4	22
11	Sandvikens IF	26	6	10	10	26	31	−5	22
12	IFK Sundsvall	26	8	6	12	25	31	−6	22
13	Skellefteå AIK	26	6	9	11	22	33	−11	21
14	Nyköpings BIS	26	2	11	13	14	52	−38	15

=== Division 2 Södra 1984 ===
Pos	Team	Pld	W	D	L	GF	GA	GD	Pts
1	Trelleborgs FF	26	20	1	5	61	26	+35	41
2	Mjällby AIF	26	14	5	7	55	33	+22	33
3	GAIS	26	11	9	6	41	29	+12	31
4	Helsingborgs IF	26	13	4	9	49	36	+13	30
5	BK Häcken	26	10	9	7	44	38	+6	29
6	Kalmar AIK	26	8	10	8	38	35	+3	26
7	Norrby IF	26	9	7	10	47	37	+10	25
8	Västra Frölunda IF	26	9	7	10	29	31	−2	25
9	IFK Malmö	26	11	3	12	39	42	−3	25
10	IS Halmia	26	9	6	11	37	37	0	24
11	Myresjö IF	26	9	6	11	35	50	−15	24
12	Landskrona BoIS	26	6	8	12	32	38	−6	20
13	Lunds BK	26	7	6	13	40	57	−17	20
14	Grimsås IF	26	3	5	18	27	85	−58	11
