= 1983 Division 2 (Swedish football) =

Swedish League Division 2
- Season: 1983
- Champions: IFK Norrköping; Kalmar FF
- Promoted: IFK Norrköping; Kalmar FF
- Relegated: Ope IF; Karlskrona AIF

Statistics of Swedish football Division 2 in season 1983.

== League standings ==
=== Division 2 Norra 1983 ===
Pos	Team	Pld	W	D	L	GF	GA	GD	Pts
1	IFK Norrköping	22	16	3	3	68	14	+54	35
2	Djurgårdens IF	22	13	5	4	46	22	+24	31
3	Örebro SK	22	10	7	5	36	27	+9	27
4	IF Brommapojkarna	22	11	4	7	37	33	+4	26 (Note: Some sources list 24 points instead of 26)
5	Västerås SK	22	9	5	8	39	41	−2	23
6	Sandvikens IF	22	8	6	8	26	29	−3	22
7	IFK Sundsvall	22	8	5	9	30	29	+1	21
8	Vasalunds IF	22	6	7	9	27	38	−11	19
9	Karlslunds IF	22	4	8	10	26	37	−11	16
10	IFK Västerås	22	6	3	13	26	52	−26	15
11	IFK Eskilstuna	22	5	5	12	15	41	−26	15
12	Ope IF	22	4	6	12	23	36	−13	14

=== Division 2 Södra 1983 ===
Pos	Team	Pld	W	D	L	GF	GA	GD	Pts
1	Kalmar FF	22	14	4	4	34	15	+19	32
2	IFK Malmö	22	13	2	7	41	24	+17	28
3	Landskrona BoIS	22	12	3	7	35	23	+12	27
4	Åtvidabergs FF	22	9	7	6	26	17	+9	25
5	IS Halmia	22	7	9	6	31	23	+8	23
6	Kalmar AIK	22	8	7	7	31	31	0	23
7	Trelleborgs FF	22	8	6	8	26	28	−2	22
8	Myresjö IF	22	7	7	8	25	27	−2	21
9	Grimsås IF	22	5	10	7	27	35	−8	20
10	Västra Frölunda IF	22	5	9	8	18	26	−8	19
11	Helsingborgs IF	22	6	5	11	22	32	−10	17
12	Karlskrona AIF	22	1	5	16	14	49	−35	7
