= 1954–55 Division 2 (Swedish football) =

Swedish League Division 2
- Season: 1954–55
- Champions: Sandvikens IF; Västerås SK; Norrby IF
- Promoted: Sandvikens IF; Västerås SK; Norrby IF
- Relegated: IF Friska Viljor; IF Älgarna; Skutskärs IF; Karlskoga IF; Södertälje SK; IS Halmia

Statistics of Swedish football Division 2 for the 1954–55 season.

== League standings ==
=== Norrland ===
Pos	Team	Pld	W	D	L	GF	GA	GD	Pts	Promotion or relegation
1	Sandvikens IF	18	15	2	1	77	18	+59	32	Promoted to Allsvenskan
2	Lycksele IF	18	8	6	4	38	23	+15	22	
3	Fagerviks GF	18	9	4	5	42	39	+3	22	
4	IFK Östersund	18	7	5	6	27	24	+3	19	
5	Ljusne AIK	18	8	3	7	33	39	−6	19	
6	Skellefteå AIK	18	5	8	5	30	33	−3	18	
7	IFK Holmsund	18	6	3	9	33	41	−8	15	
8	IF Friska Viljor	18	5	3	10	20	38	−18	13	Relegated to Division 3
9	IF Älgarna	18	4	3	11	24	46	−22	11	Relegated to Division 3
10	Skutskärs IF	18	2	5	11	22	45	−23	9	Relegated to Division 3

=== Svealand ===
Pos	Team	Pld	W	D	L	GF	GA	GD	Pts	Promotion or relegation
1	Västerås SK	18	12	2	4	32	26	+6	26	Promoted to Allsvenskan
2	IFK Eskilstuna	18	11	1	6	47	28	+19	23	
3	Motala AIF	18	9	2	7	38	30	+8	20	
4	IK City	18	9	1	8	32	23	+9	19	
5	Örebro SK	18	8	3	7	31	23	+8	19	
6	Köpings IS	18	9	1	8	36	38	−2	19	
7	Karlstads BIK	18	8	3	7	34	39	−5	19	
8	IK Brage	18	6	3	9	35	34	+1	15	
9	Karlskoga IF	18	6	1	11	23	37	−14	13	Relegated to Division 3
10	Södertälje SK	18	3	1	14	26	56	−30	7	Relegated to Division 3

=== Götaland ===
Pos	Team	Pld	W	D	L	GF	GA	GD	Pts	Promotion or relegation
1	Norrby IF	26	20	2	4	71	27	+44	42	Promoted to Allsvenskan
2	IFK Malmö	26	18	4	4	56	25	+31	40	
3	IF Elfsborg	26	16	3	7	41	26	+15	35	
4	Råå IF	26	16	2	8	45	37	+8	34	
5	Jönköpings Södra IF	26	15	2	9	56	45	+11	32	
6	BK Derby	26	12	4	10	49	36	+13	28	
7	Höganäs BK	26	9	5	12	40	37	+3	23	
8	Landskrona BoIS	26	8	6	12	31	42	−11	22	
9	IFK Trelleborg	26	9	4	13	39	53	−14	22	
10	Nybro IF	26	9	3	14	50	49	+1	21	
11	Kinna IF	26	9	2	15	29	50	−21	20	
12	IK Sleipner	26	8	3	15	36	62	−26	19	
13	Åtvidabergs FF	26	8	2	16	32	48	−16	18	
14	IS Halmia	26	2	4	20	25	63	−38	8	Relegated to Division 3
