= 1982 Division 2 (Swedish football) =

Swedish League Division 2
- Season: 1982
- Champions: Djurgårdens IF; Mjällby AIF
- Promoted: Mjällby AIF; Gefle IF; BK Häcken
- Relegated: Karlstads BK; Flens IF; IK Oddevold; IK Sleipner

Statistics of Swedish football Division 2 in season 1982.

== League standings ==
=== Division 2 Norra 1982 ===
Pos	Team	Pld	W	D	L	GF	GA	GD	Pts
1	Djurgårdens IF	22	13	4	5	50	23	+27	30
2	Gefle IF	22	12	6	4	37	24	+13	30
3	Sandvikens IF	22	12	5	5	35	17	+18	29
4	IFK Sundsvall	22	9	6	7	42	39	+3	24
5	Vasalunds IF	22	8	7	7	37	40	−3	23
6	Örebro SK	22	8	6	8	37	36	+1	22
7	Västerås SK	22	8	6	8	29	32	−3	22
8	IFK Eskilstuna	22	8	5	9	35	41	−6	21
9	IFK Västerås	22	5	9	8	19	32	−13	19
10	Ope IF	22	7	4	11	34	33	+1	18
11	Karlstad BK	22	4	10	8	33	40	−7	18
12	Flens IF	22	2	4	16	28	59	−31	8

=== Division 2 Södra 1982 ===
Pos	Team	Pld	W	D	L	GF	GA	GD	Pts
1	Mjällby AIF	22	13	5	4	39	23	+16	31
2	BK Häcken	22	12	6	4	39	23	+16	30
3	Västra Frölunda IF	22	10	8	4	35	25	+10	28
4	Helsingborgs IF	22	10	6	6	37	27	+10	26
5	Landskrona BoIS	22	9	6	7	31	31	0	24
6	Trelleborgs FF	22	9	5	8	41	28	+13	23
7	IS Halmia	22	10	3	9	32	29	+3	23
8	IFK Malmö	22	7	5	10	23	29	−6	19
9	Karlskrona AIF	22	5	8	9	33	36	−3	18
10	Myresjö IF	22	4	8	10	32	48	−16	16
11	IK Oddevold	22	5	5	12	18	37	−19	15
12	IK Sleipner	22	3	5	14	17	41	−24	11
