= Emmaboda IS =

Swedish sports club

- Full name: Emmaboda idrottssällskap
- Sport: soccer
- Founded: 1927
- Based in: Emmaboda, Sweden

Emmaboda IS is a sports club in Emmaboda, Sweden, established in 1927.

The men's soccer team has played three seasons in the Swedish second division.
