= IF Verdandi =

Sports club in Eskilstuna, Sweden

- Full name: Idrottsföreningen Verdandi
- Sport: soccer amateur wrestling, bandy, cycling, table tennis (earlier)
- Founded: 1900
- Based in: Eskilstuna, Sweden
- Ballpark: Fröslunda IP

IF Verdandi is a sports club in Eskilstuna, Sweden, established in 1900. The club runs soccer, earlier also amateur wrestling, bandy, cycling, and table tennis. The men's bandy team played in the Swedish top division in 1932, 1933 and 1941.

The men's soccer team has played the Swedish second division during the seasons of 1942–1943, 1943–1944 and 1944–1945.

Kjell Johansson has played table tennis for the club.
