= Finspångs AIK =

Swedish sports club

- City: Finspång, Sweden
- League: Division 1
- Division: Mellersta
- Founded: 1937; 88 years ago

Finspångs Allmänna Idrottsklubb, FAIK, is a multi-sport club in Finspång, Sweden, founded in 1937. The club colours are red, white and yellow. practices badminton, bandy, table tennis, boxing, amateur wrestling, track and field athletics, ice hockey and tennis, earlier also handball, soccer and figure skating.

The club is most well known for its teams in association football and bandy. Bandy was played by a predecessor club, Finspongs IK, since 1919, and has been played by FAIK from the start. The Finspångs AIK men's bandy team played the 1941 season in the Swedish top division.

The club has been playing in the present second level league of Swedish bandy, Allsvenskan, since its inaugural season in 2007/08 season except for the 2013/14 season, but will play there again for the 2014/15 season.
