= Husqvarna IF =

Sports club in Huskvarna, Sweden

Huskvarna IF
- Sport: association football, earlier even bandy, ice hockey
- Founded: 22 September 1904
- Based in: Huskvarna, Sweden
- Ballpark: Vapenvallen

Husqvarna IF is a sports club in Huskvarna, Sweden. It was founded on 22 September 1904. It supported clubs in various sports, including bandy, football, and ice hockey. The ice hockey section merged with Vätterstads IK in 1971 to form Huskvarna/Vätterstads IF, though the club was soon thereafter renamed to HV71.

In late 2009, after years of inactivity, the activity was resumed again.

== Sports ==
=== Bandy ===
The bandy section of the club ran until 1947. The club won the Småland District Championship in 1931 and 1933.

=== Football ===
The club's football team played their first season in the Swedish second division during the 1933/1934 season, and their final in 1964. In 1987, the men's association football team merged with Huskvarna Södra IS, establishing Husqvarna FF.

=== Ice hockey ===
The club started ice hockey activities in 1947. It was relegated from the Swedish second division during the 1969–1970 season.
