= IF Saab =

Sports club in Linköping, Sweden

- Full name: Idrottsföreningen Saab
- Nicknames: Lejonen
- Sport: football, handball
- Founded: 1941
- Folded: June 27, 2016; 10 years ago
- Based in: Linköping, Sweden
- Stadium: Linköpings Sporthall

Idrottsföreningen Saab was a Swedish sports club from Linköping, Östergötland County founded in 1941 by people working at Saab and most known for its association football and handball teams. They took part in the 1973 Allsvenskan. In 1981, IF Saab merged with BK Derby to form Linköpings FF.

Besides football, the club also had active sections for the sports badminton, bandy, table tennis, bowling, boxing, archery, bicycle racing, athletics, gymnastics, handball, company sports, skiing, orienteering, tennis, and varpa.

The handball team won the Swedish Championship three times; in 1967–68, 1972–73 and 1973–74. In 1965 they won the Swedish championship in Field handball.

On 17 August 1995 the club was refounded as HF Linköpings Lejon, which ultimately was dissolved on 27 June 2016.
