= Surahammars IF =

Surahammars IF Hockey "Blue Hammers"
- City: Surahammar, Sweden
- League: Division 1
- Division: 1C
- Founded: 1914
- Home arena: Surahallen
- Colors: Blue, red, white
- General manager: Mikael Schilström
- Head coach: Johan Rauch
- Website: Official site (in Swedish)

Surahammars IF is a sports club in Surahammar, Sweden. The club was officially founded on 4 June 1914, although the activity started in 1911. The focus now of the club is ice hockey, although they have had the highest success with association football and bandy (reaching the second highest divisions in Sweden). The ice hockey section (Sura Blue Hammers) now plays in the third highest division in Sweden, but has previously played in the first division.

== Famous players ==
- Ronald Pettersson
- Tommy Salo
- Stig-Göran Johansson
