= 1946–47 in Swedish football =

The 1946–47 season in Swedish football, starting August 1946 and ending July 1947:

== Honours ==
=== Official titles ===
Title	Team	Reason
Swedish Champions 1946–47	IFK Norrköping	Winners of Allsvenskan
Swedish Cup Champions 1946	Malmö FF	Winners of Svenska Cupen

=== Competitions ===
Level	Competition	Team
1st level	Allsvenskan 1946–47	IFK Norrköping
2nd level	Division 2 Norra 1946–47	Ludvika FfI
2nd level	Division 2 Östra 1946–47	Jönköpings Södra IF
2nd level	Division 2 Västra 1946–47	Örgryte IS
2nd level	Division 2 Södra 1946–47	Halmstads BK
Regional Championship	Norrländska Mästerskapet 1947	Ljusne AIK
Cup	Svenska Cupen 1946	Malmö FF

== Promotions, relegations and qualifications ==
=== Promotions ===
Promoted from	Promoted to	Team	Reason
Division 2 Östra 1946–47	Allsvenskan 1947–48	Jönköpings Södra IF	Winners of promotion play-off
Division 2 Södra 1946–47	Allsvenskan 1947–48	Halmstads BK	Winners of promotion play-off

=== League transfers ===
Transferred from	Transferred to	Team	Reason
Division 2 Norra 1946–47	Division 2 Nordöstra 1947–48	Ludvika FfI	Winners
Division 2 Norra 1946–47	Division 2 Nordöstra 1947–48	Sandvikens AIK	2nd team
Division 2 Norra 1946–47	Division 2 Nordöstra 1947–48	Surahammars IF	3rd team
Division 2 Norra 1946–47	Division 2 Nordöstra 1947–48	Västerås IK	4th team
Division 2 Norra 1946–47	Division 2 Nordöstra 1947–48	IFK Västerås	5th team
Division 2 Östra 1946–47	Division 2 Nordöstra 1947–48	IK Sleipner	3rd team
Division 2 Östra 1946–47	Division 2 Nordöstra 1947–48	Reymersholms IK	5th team
Division 2 Västra 1946–47	Division 2 Nordöstra 1947–48	Karlstads BIK	4th team
Division 2 Västra 1946–47	Division 2 Nordöstra 1947–48	Karlskoga IF	5th team
Division 2 Östra 1946–47	Division 2 Sydvästra 1947–48	Åtvidabergs FF	2nd team
Division 2 Östra 1946–47	Division 2 Sydvästra 1947–48	Husqvarna IF	4th team
Division 2 Västra 1946–47	Division 2 Sydvästra 1947–48	Örgryte IS	Winners
Division 2 Västra 1946–47	Division 2 Sydvästra 1947–48	Tidaholms GIF	2nd team
Division 2 Västra 1946–47	Division 2 Sydvästra 1947–48	IFK Uddevalla	3rd team
Division 2 Södra 1946–47	Division 2 Sydvästra 1947–48	Landskrona BoIS	2nd team
Division 2 Södra 1946–47	Division 2 Sydvästra 1947–48	IFK Malmö	3rd team
Division 2 Södra 1946–47	Division 2 Sydvästra 1947–48	Kalmar FF	4th team
Division 2 Södra 1946–47	Division 2 Sydvästra 1947–48	Höganäs BK	5th team

=== Relegations ===
Relegated from	Relegated to	Team	Reason
Allsvenskan 1946–47	Division 2 Nordöstra 1947–48	Örebro SK	11th team
Allsvenskan 1946–47	Division 2 Sydvästra 1947–48	Billingsfors IK	12th team
Division 2 Norra 1946–47	Division 3 1947–48	IK Brage	6th team
Division 2 Norra 1946–47	Division 3 1947–48	Sandvikens IF	7th team
Division 2 Norra 1946–47	Division 3 1947–48	Avesta AIK	8th team
Division 2 Norra 1946–47	Division 3 1947–48	Iggesunds IK	9th team
Division 2 Norra 1946–47	Division 4 1947–48	Enköpings SK	10th team
Division 2 Östra 1946–47	Division 3 1947–48	BK Derby	6th team
Division 2 Östra 1946–47	Division 3 1947–48	IFK Eskilstuna	7th team
Division 2 Östra 1946–47	Division 3 1947–48	IFK Värnamo	8th team
Division 2 Östra 1946–47	Division 3 1947–48	IFK Lidingö	9th team
Division 2 Östra 1946–47	Division 4 1947–48	Hammarby IF	10th team
Division 2 Västra 1946–47	Division 3 1947–48	Lundby IF	6th team
Division 2 Västra 1946–47	Division 3 1947–48	IFK Trollhättan	7th team
Division 2 Västra 1946–47	Division 3 1947–48	Göteborgs FF	8th team
Division 2 Västra 1946–47	Division 3 1947–48	IF Viken	9th team
Division 2 Västra 1946–47	Division 4 1947–48	Deje IK	10th team
Division 2 Södra 1946–47	Division 3 1947–48	Kalmar AIK	6th team
Division 2 Södra 1946–47	Division 3 1947–48	Olofströms IF	7th team
Division 2 Södra 1946–47	Division 3 1947–48	Malmö BI	8th team
Division 2 Södra 1946–47	Division 3 1947–48	Nybro IF	9th team
Division 2 Södra 1946–47	Division 4 1947–48	Alets IK	10th team

== Domestic results ==
=== Allsvenskan 1946–47 ===

	Team	Pld	W	D	L	GF		GA	GD	Pts
1	IFK Norrköping	22	16	4	2	73	–	23	+50	36
2	AIK	22	13	4	5	59	–	32	+27	30
3	Malmö FF	22	10	8	4	51	–	30	+21	28
4	IF Elfsborg	22	12	2	8	55	–	42	+13	26
5	IFK Göteborg	22	9	6	7	52	–	48	+4	24
6	Degerfors IF	22	8	6	8	35	–	33	+2	22
7	IS Halmia	22	8	6	8	38	–	43	-5	22
8	Helsingborgs IF	22	11	0	11	44	–	50	-6	22
9	Djurgårdens IF	22	8	4	10	40	–	46	-6	20
10	GAIS	22	5	8	9	30	–	40	-10	18
11	Örebro SK	22	5	3	14	40	–	74	-34	13
12	Billingsfors IK	22	0	3	19	28	–	84	-56	3

=== Allsvenskan promotion play-off 1946–47 ===
May 26, 1947

Ludvika FfI	1–2	Jönköpings Södra IF

?, Ludvika
June 1, 1947

Jönköpings Södra IF	1–0	Ludvika FfI

?, Jönköping

May 26, 1947

Halmstads BK	2–0	Örgryte IS

?, Halmstad
May 30, 1947

Örgryte IS	1–4	Halmstads BK

?, Gothenburg

=== Division 2 Norra 1946–47 ===

	Team	Pld	W	D	L	GF		GA	GD	Pts
1	Ludvika FfI	18	15	1	2	45	–	18	+27	31
2	Sandvikens AIK	18	11	4	3	48	–	22	+26	26
3	Surahammars IF	18	9	2	7	26	–	23	+3	20
4	Västerås IK	18	7	4	7	32	–	34	-2	18
5	IFK Västerås	18	5	7	6	24	–	24	0	17
6	IK Brage	18	8	1	9	33	–	38	-5	17
7	Sandvikens IF	18	5	4	9	28	–	35	-7	14
8	Avesta AIK	18	5	4	9	26	–	33	-7	14
9	Iggesunds IK	18	5	4	9	26	–	39	-13	14
10	Enköpings SK	18	4	1	13	19	–	41	-22	9

=== Division 2 Östra 1946–47 ===
	Team	Pld	W	D	L	GF		GA	GD	Pts
1	Jönköpings Södra IF	18	13	2	3	63	–	22	+41	28
2	Åtvidabergs FF	18	12	3	3	52	–	27	+25	27
3	IK Sleipner	18	8	6	4	41	–	29	+12	22
4	Husqvarna IF	18	9	2	7	44	–	42	+2	20
5	Reymersholms IK	18	7	5	6	26	–	29	-3	19
6	BK Derby	18	7	2	9	19	–	32	-13	16
7	IFK Eskilstuna	18	7	1	10	19	–	33	-14	15
8	IFK Värnamo	18	5	4	9	32	–	39	-7	14
9	IFK Lidingö	18	5	3	10	24	–	34	-10	13
10	Hammarby IF	18	2	2	14	14	–	47	-33	6

=== Division 2 Västra 1946–47 ===
	Team	Pld	W	D	L	GF		GA	GD	Pts
1	Örgryte IS	18	13	2	3	53	–	26	+27	28
2	Tidaholms GIF	18	10	4	4	48	–	25	+23	24
3	IFK Uddevalla	18	8	5	5	28	–	24	+4	21
4	Karlstads BIK	18	9	2	7	36	–	31	+5	20
5	Karlskoga IF	18	8	4	6	33	–	33	0	20
6	Lundby IF	18	5	7	6	17	–	21	-4	17
7	IFK Trollhättan	18	5	5	8	29	–	36	-7	15
8	Göteborgs FF	18	6	1	11	22	–	29	-7	13
9	IF Viken	18	5	2	11	29	–	45	-16	12
10	Deje IK	18	4	2	12	21	–	46	-25	10

=== Division 2 Södra 1946–47 ===
	Team	Pld	W	D	L	GF		GA	GD	Pts
1	Halmstads BK	18	11	3	4	56	–	27	+29	25
2	Landskrona BoIS	18	9	4	5	46	–	36	+10	22
3	IFK Malmö	18	9	3	6	40	–	33	+7	21
4	Kalmar FF	18	10	1	7	36	–	31	+5	21
5	Höganäs BK	18	9	2	7	50	–	39	+11	20
6	Kalmar AIK	18	9	2	7	41	–	41	0	20
7	Olofströms IF	18	7	1	10	42	–	51	-9	15
8	Malmö BI	18	4	5	9	30	–	50	-20	13
9	Nybro IF	18	4	4	10	28	–	40	-12	12
10	Alets IK	18	4	3	11	22	–	43	-21	11

=== Norrländska Mästerskapet 1947 ===
Final

July 11, 1947

Ljusne AIK	3–3 4–3 (aet)	Skellefteå AIK

Råsunda, Solna

=== Svenska Cupen 1946 ===
Final

August 25, 1946

Malmö FF	3–0	Åtvidabergs FF

Råsunda, Solna

== National team results ==
September 15, 1946
Friendly
№ 252

Norway	0–3	Sweden
		Nyberg 33'; Gren 75'; Karlsson 84'

Ullevaal, Oslo
Attendance: 37,000
Referee: Asmussen (Denmark)

Sweden: Gustav Sjöberg - Harry Nilsson, Börje Leander - Olle Åhlund, Bertil Nordahl, Rune Emanuelsson - Arne Nyberg, Gunnar Gren, Eric Karlsson, Knut Nordahl, Stig Nyström.

September 15, 1946
Friendly
№ 253

Finland	0–7	Sweden
		G. Nilsson 1', 49', 53'; Jönsson 36', 87'; Karlsson 46'; Rosén 60' (p)

Olympiastadion, Helsinki
Attendance: 18,421
Referee: Randers-Johansen (Norway)

Sweden: Magnus Bergström - Hans Malmström, John Wikdahl - Kjell Rosén, Sture Mårtensson, Kjell Hjertsson - Egon Jönsson, Börje Tapper, Gustaf Nilsson, Bror Karlsson, Stellan Nilsson.

October 6, 1946
Friendly
№ 254

Sweden	3–3	Denmark
Gren 12'; K. Nordahl 44'; G. Nordahl 85'		Præst 70'; Sørensen 75'; Hansen 86'

Ullevi, Gothenburg
Attendance: 29,954
Referee: Lundström (Finland)

Sweden: Gustav Sjöberg - Harry Nilsson, Erik Nilsson - Kjell Rosén, Bertil Nordahl, Rune Emanuelsson - Arne Nyberg, Gunnar Gren, Gunnar Nordahl, Knut Nordahl, Stellan Nilsson.

June 15, 1947
1937–47 Nordic Championship
№ 255

Denmark	1–4	Sweden
Hansen 58'		Nordahl 7', 21'; Liedholm 30'; Lindskog 49'

Idrætsparken, Copenhagen
Attendance: 38,000
Referee: Reader (England)

Sweden: Torsten Lindberg - Harry Nilsson, Knut Nordahl - Kjell Rosén, Börje Leander, Sune Andersson - Lennart Lindskog, Gunnar Gren, Gunnar Nordahl, Nils Liedholm, Stig Nyström.

June 26, 1947
Jubilee tournament
(SPL/FBF - 40) semi-finals
№ 256

Sweden	6–1	Denmark
Leander 4' (p), 39' (p); Andersson 25'; G. Nordahl 47'; Nyström 50'; Mårtensson 87'		Sørensen 82'

Råsunda, Solna
Attendance: 38,000
Referee: Daehlen (Norway)

Sweden: Torsten Lindberg - Harry Nilsson, Knut Nordahl - Kjell Rosén, Börje Leander, Sune Andersson - Malte Mårtensson, Gunnar Gren, Gunnar Nordahl, Nils Liedholm, Stig Nyström.

June 28, 1947
Jubilee tournament
(SPL/FBF - 40) final
№ 257

Norway	1–5	Sweden
Brynhildsen 17'		G. Nordahl 18', 56', 59', 85'; Persson 86'

Olympiastadion, Helsinki
Attendance: 24,407
Referee: Alho (Finland)

Sweden: Torsten Lindberg - Harry Nilsson, Knut Nordahl - Kjell Rosén, Börje Leander, Sune Andersson - Sven Persson, Gunnar Gren, Gunnar Nordahl, Nils Liedholm, Stig Nyström.

== National team players in season 1946/47 ==
name	pos.	caps	goals	club
Olle Åhlund	MF	1	0	Degerfors IF
Sune "Mona-Lisa" Andersson	MF	3	1	AIK
Magnus "Skjorta" Bergström	GK	1	0	Degerfors IF
Rune "Killing" Emanuelsson	MF	2	0	IFK Göteborg
Gunnar "Il Professore" Gren	FW	5	2	IFK Göteborg
Kjell Hjertsson	MF	1	0	Malmö FF
Egon "Hemliga" Jönsson	FW	1	2	Malmö FF
Bror Karlsson	FW	1	1	Hälsingborgs IF
Eric "Prosten" Karlsson	FW	1	1	AIK
Börje Leander	DF/MF	4	2	AIK
Nils "Lidas"/"Greven" Liedholm	FW	3	1	IFK Norrköping
Torsten "Lindy" Lindberg	GK	3	0	IFK Norrköping
Lennart Lindskog	FW	1	1	Degerfors IF
Hans Malmström	DF	1	0	Malmö FF
Malte "Svarta Blixten" Mårtensson	FW	1	1	Hälsingborgs IF
Sture Mårtensson	MF	1	0	Malmö FF
Erik Nilsson	DF	1	0	Malmö FF
Gustaf Nilsson	FW	1	3	Malmö FF
Harry Nilsson	DF	5	0	AIK
Stellan Nilsson	FW	2	0	Malmö FF
Bertil Nordahl	MF	2	0	Degerfors IF
Gunnar Nordahl	FW	4	8	IFK Norrköping
Knut Nordahl	FW/DF	5	1	IFK Norrköping
Arne Nyberg	FW	2	1	IFK Göteborg
Stig Nyström	FW	4	1	Djurgårdens IF
Sven "Skuggan" Persson	FW	1	1	IFK Norrköping
Kjell Rosén	MF	5	1	Malmö FF
Gustav "Gurra" Sjöberg	GK	2	0	AIK
Börje Tapper	FW	1	0	Malmö FF
John "Nonne" Wikdahl	DF	1	0	Hälsingborgs IF
