= 1945–46 in Swedish football =

The 1945–46 season in Swedish football, starting August 1945 and ending July 1946:

== Honours ==
=== Official titles ===
Title	Team	Reason
Swedish Champions 1945–46	IFK Norrköping	Winners of Allsvenskan
Swedish Cup Champions 1945	IFK Norrköping	Winners of Svenska Cupen

=== Competitions ===
Level	Competition	Team
1st level	Allsvenskan 1945–46	IFK Norrköping
2nd level	Division 2 Norra 1945–46	Surahammars IF
2nd level	Division 2 Östra 1945–46	Örebro SK
2nd level	Division 2 Västra 1945–46	Billingsfors IK
2nd level	Division 2 Södra 1945–46	Landskrona BoIS
Cup	Svenska Cupen 1945	IFK Norrköping

== Promotions, relegations and qualifications ==
=== Promotions ===
Promoted from	Promoted to	Team	Reason
Division 2 Östra 1945–46	Allsvenskan 1946–47	Örebro SK	Winners of promotion play-off
Division 2 Västra 1945–46	Allsvenskan 1946–47	Billingsfors IK	Winners of promotion play-off
Division 3 1945–46	Division 2 Norra 1946–47	Enköpings SK	Winners of promotion play-off
Division 3 1945–46	Division 2 Norra 1946–47	Iggesunds IK	Winners of promotion play-off
Division 3 1945–46	Division 2 Östra 1946–47	IFK Lidingö	Winners of promotion play-off
Division 3 1945–46	Division 2 Östra 1946–47	IFK Värnamo	Winners of promotion play-off
Division 3 1945–46	Division 2 Västra 1946–47	IFK Trollhättan	Winners of promotion play-off
Division 3 1945–46	Division 2 Västra 1946–47	IF Viken	Winners of promotion play-off
Division 3 1945–46	Division 2 Södra 1946–47	Höganäs BK	Winners of promotion play-off
Division 3 1945–46	Division 2 Södra 1946–47	Olofströms IF	Winners of promotion play-off

=== League transfers ===
Transferred from	Transferred to	Team	Reason
Division 2 Södra 1945–46	Division 2 Östra 1946–47	Husqvarna IF	Geographical composition
Division 2 Östra 1945–46	Division 2 Västra 1946–47	Karlskoga IF	Geographical composition

=== Relegations ===
Relegated from	Relegated to	Team	Reason
Allsvenskan 1945–46	Division 2 Östra 1946–47	Jönköpings Södra IF	11th team
Allsvenskan 1945–46	Division 2 Södra 1946–47	Halmstads BK	12th team
Division 2 Norra 1945–46	Division 3 1946–47	Ljusne AIK	9th team
Division 2 Norra 1945–46	Division 3 1946–47	Långshyttans AIK	10th team
Division 2 Östra 1945–46	Division 3 1946–47	Sundbybergs IK	9th team
Division 2 Östra 1945–46	Division 3 1946–47	Hagalunds IS	10th team
Division 2 Västra 1945–46	Division 3 1946–47	IFK Tidaholm	9th team
Division 2 Västra 1945–46	Division 3 1946–47	Gårda BK	10th team
Division 2 Södra 1945–46	Division 3 1946–47	Limhamns IF	9th team
Division 2 Södra 1945–46	Division 3 1946–47	Blomstermåla IK	10th team

== Domestic results ==
=== Allsvenskan 1945–46 ===

	Team	Pld	W	D	L	GF		GA	GD	Pts
1	IFK Norrköping	22	16	3	3	67	–	22	+45	35
2	Malmö FF	22	13	4	5	48	–	27	+21	30
3	IFK Göteborg	22	12	6	4	48	–	29	+19	30
4	GAIS	22	11	6	5	36	–	28	+8	28
5	Degerfors IF	22	9	5	8	31	–	23	+8	23
6	AIK	22	8	6	8	44	–	45	-1	22
7	IF Elfsborg	22	7	6	9	43	–	44	-1	20
8	Helsingborgs IF	22	6	6	10	45	–	57	-12	18
9	IS Halmia	22	5	7	10	40	–	49	-9	17
10	Djurgårdens IF	22	7	2	13	42	–	64	-22	16
11	Jönköpings Södra IF	22	6	3	13	31	–	60	-29	15
12	Halmstads BK	22	3	4	15	24	–	51	-27	10

=== Allsvenskan promotion play-off 1945–46 ===
May 26, 1946

Örebro SK	2–0	Surahammars IF

?, Örebro
June 2, 1946

Surahammars IF	3–0	Örebro SK

?, Surahammar
June 10, 1946

Örebro SK	2–1	Surahammars IF

?, Solna

May 26, 1946

Billingsfors IK	3–0	Landskrona BoIS

?, Billingsfors
June 2, 1946

Landskrona BoIS	1–0	Billingsfors IK

?, Landskrona
June 10, 1946

Billingsfors IK	4–1	Landskrona BoIS

?, Gothenburg

=== Division 2 Norra 1945–46 ===

	Team	Pld	W	D	L	GF		GA	GD	Pts
1	Surahammars IF	18	12	2	4	39	–	20	+19	26
2	Avesta AIK	18	11	3	4	39	–	25	+14	25
3	IFK Västerås	18	9	5	4	39	–	24	+15	23
4	IK Brage	18	10	1	7	39	–	26	+13	21
5	Västerås IK	18	9	1	8	30	–	29	+1	19
6	Ludvika FfI	18	7	4	7	41	–	34	+7	18
7	Sandvikens IF	18	7	3	8	34	–	35	-1	17
8	Sandvikens AIK	18	5	5	8	29	–	37	-8	15
9	Ljusne AIK	18	3	2	13	26	–	49	-23	8
10	Långshyttans AIK	18	4	0	14	31	–	68	-37	8

=== Division 2 Östra 1945–46 ===
	Team	Pld	W	D	L	GF		GA	GD	Pts
1	Örebro SK	18	14	2	2	58	–	36	+22	30
2	Åtvidabergs FF	18	8	4	6	46	–	32	+14	20
3	IK Sleipner	18	10	0	8	49	–	37	+12	20
4	Hammarby IF	18	9	2	7	47	–	38	+9	20
5	IFK Eskilstuna	18	9	1	8	27	–	20	+7	19
6	Reymersholms IK	18	7	4	7	28	–	32	-4	18
7	BK Derby	18	7	3	8	33	–	30	+3	17
8	Karlskoga IF	18	6	2	10	27	–	37	-10	14
9	Sundbybergs IK	18	6	1	11	25	–	49	-24	13
10	Hagalunds IS	18	3	3	12	23	–	52	-29	9

=== Division 2 Västra 1945–46 ===
	Team	Pld	W	D	L	GF		GA	GD	Pts
1	Billingsfors IK	18	12	4	2	46	–	27	+19	28
2	Tidaholms GIF	18	9	3	6	38	–	29	+9	21
3	Lundby IF	18	7	7	4	34	–	29	+5	21
4	Deje IK	18	8	4	6	29	–	28	+1	20
5	IFK Uddevalla	18	7	6	5	25	–	34	-9	20
6	Örgryte IS	18	6	5	7	40	–	28	+12	17
7	Göteborgs FF	18	7	1	10	32	–	32	0	15
8	Karlstads BIK	18	6	2	10	29	–	36	-7	14
9	IFK Tidaholm	18	5	4	9	27	–	35	-8	14
10	Gårda BK	18	5	0	13	28	–	50	-22	10

=== Division 2 Södra 1945–46 ===
	Team	Pld	W	D	L	GF		GA	GD	Pts
1	Landskrona BoIS	18	13	3	2	53	–	20	+33	29
2	Husqvarna IF	18	12	3	3	51	–	29	+22	27
3	IFK Malmö	18	10	3	5	48	–	30	+18	23
4	Kalmar FF	18	9	3	6	42	–	27	+15	21
5	Nybro IF	18	10	1	7	48	–	38	+10	21
6	Kalmar AIK	18	7	2	9	38	–	46	-8	16
7	Alets IK	18	5	4	9	29	–	39	-10	14
8	Malmö BI	18	6	2	10	34	–	53	-19	14
9	Limhamns IF	18	4	4	10	22	–	31	-9	12
10	Blomstermåla IK	18	1	1	16	15	–	67	-52	3

=== Division 2 promotion play-off 1945–46 ===
1st round

May 19, 1946

Enköpings SK	0–1	Hallstahammars SK

?, ?
May 26, 1946

Hallstahammars SK	0–2	Enköpings SK

?, ?
May 30, 1946

Enköpings SK	2–1	Hallstahammars SK

?, ?

May 19, 1946

IF Viken	3–3	Kungshamns IF

?, ?
May 26, 1946

Kungshamns IF	1–2	IF Viken

?, ?

2nd round

May 26, 1946

Iggesunds IK	2–2	Forssa BK

?, ?
June 2, 1946

Forssa BK	0–0	Iggesunds IK

?, ?
June 5, 1946

Iggesunds IK	3–2	Forssa BK

?, ?

May 26, 1946

Forsbacka IK	2–0	IFK Lidingö

?, ?
June 2, 1946

IFK Lidingö	4–1	Forsbacka IK

?, ?
June 10, 1946

Forsbacka IK	0–4	IFK Lidingö

?, ?

June 2, 1946

Enköpings SK	3–2	IK City

?, ?
June 7, 1946

IK City	4–1	Enköpings SK

?, ?
June 10, 1946

Enköpings SK	2–0	IK City

?, ?

May 30, 1946

IFK Bofors	2–3	IF Viken

?, ?
June 2, 1946

IF Viken	4–0	IFK Bofors

?, ?

May 26, 1946

IFK Trollhättan	1–1	Jonsereds IF

?, ?
June 2, 1946

Jonsereds IF	1–2	IFK Trollhättan

?, ?

May 26, 1946

Höganäs BK	4–1	Varbergs BoIS

?, ?
June 2, 1946

Varbergs BoIS	1–2	Höganäs BK

?, ?

May 26, 1946

Finspångs AIK	1–1	IFK Värnamo

?, ?
June 2, 1946

IFK Värnamo	1–0	Finspångs AIK

?, ?

May 26, 1946

Västerviks AIS	0–2	Olofströms IF

?, ?
June 2, 1946

Olofströms IF	3–1	Västerviks AIS

?, ?

=== Svenska Cupen 1945 ===
Final

August 26, 1945

IFK Norrköping	4–1	Malmö FF

Råsunda, Solna

== National team results ==
August 26, 1945
Friendly
№ 245

Sweden	7–2	Finland
Nyberg 3', 48'; Gren 8', 60', 77'; Carlsson 49'; Grahn 80'		Beijar 26', 28'

Ullevi, Gothenburg
Attendance: 18,542
Referee: Randers-Johansen (Norway)

Sweden: Gustav Sjöberg - Harry Nilsson, Börje Leander - Olle Åhlund, Arvid Emanuelsson, Karl-Erik Grahn - Arne Nyberg, Gunnar Gren, Carl Simonsson, Henry Carlsson, Bertil Bäckvall.

September 30, 1945
Friendly
№ 246

Sweden	4–1	Denmark
Nordahl 26'; Carlsson 37'; Jegsen 39' (og); S. Nilsson 53'		Pålsson 16'

Råsunda, Solna
Attendance: 37,041
Referee: Alho (Finland)

Sweden: Gustav Sjöberg - Harry Nilsson, Gösta Malm - Olle Åhlund, Arvid Emanuelsson, Karl-Erik Grahn - Arne Nyberg, Gunnar Gren, Gunnar Nordahl, Henry Carlsson, Stellan Nilsson.

September 30, 1945
Friendly
№ 247

Finland	1–6	Sweden
Sotiola 25'		Tapper 36', 59', 81', 82', 88'; E. Holmqvist 49'

Olympiastadion, Helsinki
Attendance: 15,981
Referee: Jørkov (Denmark)

Sweden: Henry Andersson - Oskar Holmqvist, Ove Karlsson-Widricks - Birger Rosengren, Börje Leander, Lennart Wigren - Malte Mårtensson, Börje Tapper, Knut Nordahl, Erik Holmqvist, Carl-Erik Sandberg.

October 21, 1945
Friendly
№ 248

Sweden	10–0	Norway
Persson 1'; Nordahl 12', 26', 82', 89'; Carlsson 31', 61'; Nyberg 48', 85'; Gren 73'

Råsunda, Solna
Attendance: 28,949
Referee: Laursen (Denmark)

Sweden: Gustav Sjöberg - Harry Nilsson, Gösta Malm - Olle Åhlund, Arvid Emanuelsson, Karl-Erik Grahn - Arne Nyberg, Gunnar Gren, Gunnar Nordahl, Henry Carlsson, Vincent Persson.

November 25, 1945
Friendly
№ 249

Switzerland	3–0	Sweden
Amadò 25', 44'; Friedländer 76'

Stade des Charmilles, Geneva
Attendance: 25,000
Referee: Reader (England)

Sweden: Gustav Sjöberg ( Henry Andersson) - Harry Nilsson, Bertil Nordahl - Olle Åhlund, Arvid Emanuelsson, Rune Emanuelsson - Arne Nyberg, Gunnar Gren, Gunnar Nordahl, Henry Carlsson, Erik Holmqvist.

June 23, 1946
Friendly
№ 250

Denmark	3–1	Sweden
Pløger 40'; Sørensen 87'; Præst 89'		Gren 58'

Idrætsparken, Copenhagen
Attendance: 38,000
Referee: Carlsen (Norway)

Sweden: Gustav Sjöberg - Harry Nilsson, Rune Emanuelsson - Olle Åhlund, Arvid Emanuelsson ( Börje Leander), Karl-Erik Grahn - Arne Nyberg, Gunnar Gren, Gunnar Nordahl, Henry Carlsson, Stellan Nilsson.

July 7, 1946
Friendly
№ 251

Sweden	7–2	Switzerland
Gren 30', 55', 61', 79'; Nyström 42'; Courtat 66' (og); G. Nordahl 89'		Lanz 7'; Courtat 60'

Råsunda, Solna
Attendance: 37,487
Referee: Reader (England)

Sweden: Gustav Sjöberg - Harry Nilsson, Oskar Holmqvist ( Börje Leander) - Olle Åhlund, Bertil Nordahl, Rune Emanuelsson - Arne Nyberg, Gunnar Gren, Gunnar Nordahl, Knut Nordahl, Stig Nyström.

== National team players in season 1945/46 ==
name	pos.	caps	goals	club
Olle Åhlund	MF	6	0	Degerfors IF
Henry Andersson	GK	2	0	IFK Göteborg
Bertil Bäckvall	FW	1	0	Hammarby IF
Henry "Garvis" Carlsson	FW	5	4	AIK
Arvid "Emma" Emanuelsson	MF	5	0	IF Elfsborg
Rune "Killing" Emanuelsson	MF/DF	3	0	IFK Göteborg
Karl-Erik Grahn	MF	4	1	IF Elfsborg
Gunnar "Il Professore" Gren	FW	6	9	IFK Göteborg
Erik "Mulle" Holmqvist	FW	2	1	IFK Norrköping
Oskar "Masse" Holmqvist	DF	2	0	IFK Norrköping
Ove Karlsson-Widricks	DF	1	0	AIK
Börje Leander	DF/MF	4	0	AIK
Gösta Malm	DF	2	0	IFK Norrköping
Malte "Svarta Blixten" Mårtensson	FW	1	0	Hälsingborgs IF
Harry Nilsson	DF	6	0	AIK
Stellan Nilsson	FW	2	1	Malmö FF
Bertil Nordahl	DF/MF	2	0	Degerfors IF
Gunnar Nordahl	FW	5	6	IFK Norrköping
Knut Nordahl	FW	2	0	IFK Norrköping
Arne Nyberg	FW	6	4	IFK Göteborg
Stig Nyström	FW	1	1	Djurgårdens IF
Vincent Persson	FW	1	1	Degerfors IF
Birger "Bian" Rosengren	MF	1	0	IFK Norrköping
Carl-Erik "Pigge" Sandberg	FW	1	0	Malmö FF
Carl "Timpa" Simonsson	FW	1	0	Jönköpings Södra IF
Gustav "Gurra" Sjöberg	GK	6	0	AIK
Börje Tapper	FW	1	5	Malmö FF
Lennart "Skinnet" Wigren	MF	1	0	IFK Norrköping
