= 1947–48 in Swedish football =

The 1947–48 season in Swedish football, starting August 1947 and ending July 1948:

== Honours ==
=== Official titles ===
Title	Team	Reason
Swedish Champions 1947–48	IFK Norrköping	Winners of Allsvenskan
Swedish Cup Champions 1947	Malmö FF	Winners of Svenska Cupen

=== Competitions ===
Level	Competition	Team
1st level	Allsvenskan 1947–48	IFK Norrköping
2nd level	Division 2 Nordöstra 1947–48	Örebro SK
2nd level	Division 2 Sydvästra 1947–48	Landskrona BoIS
Regional Championship	Norrländska Mästerskapet 1948	IFK Holmsund
Cup	Svenska Cupen 1947	Malmö FF

== Promotions, relegations and qualifications ==
=== Promotions ===
Promoted from	Promoted to	Team	Reason
Division 2 Nordöstra 1947–48	Allsvenskan 1948–49	Örebro SK	Winners
Division 2 Sydvästra 1947–48	Allsvenskan 1948–49	Landskrona BoIS	Winners
Division 3 1947–48	Division 2 Nordöstra 1948–49	Sandvikens IF	Winners of Norra
Division 3 1947–48	Division 2 Nordöstra 1948–49	Sundbybergs IK	Winners of Östra
Division 3 1947–48	Division 2 Sydvästra 1948–49	Jonsereds IF	Winners of Västra
Division 3 1947–48	Division 2 Sydvästra 1948–49	Råå IF	Winners of Södra

=== League transfers ===
Transferred from	Transferred to	Team	Reason
Division 2 Nordöstra 1947–48	Division 2 Sydvästra 1948–49	Karlstads BIK	Geographical composition
Division 2 Sydvästra 1947–48	Division 2 Nordöstra 1948–49	Åtvidabergs FF	Geographical composition

=== Relegations ===
Relegated from	Relegated to	Team	Reason
Allsvenskan 1947–48	Division 2 Nordöstra 1948–49	Djurgårdens IF	11th team
Allsvenskan 1947–48	Division 2 Sydvästra 1948–49	Halmstads BK	12th team
Division 2 Nordöstra 1947–48	Division 3 1948–49	Västerås IK	9th team
Division 2 Nordöstra 1947–48	Division 3 1948–49	IFK Västerås	10th team
Division 2 Sydvästra 1947–48	Division 3 1948–49	Husqvarna IF	9th team
Division 2 Sydvästra 1947–48	Division 3 1948–49	IFK Uddevalla	10th team

== Domestic results ==
=== Allsvenskan 1947–48 ===

	Team	Pld	W	D	L	GF		GA	GD	Pts
1	IFK Norrköping	22	15	3	4	56	–	32	+24	33
2	Malmö FF	22	12	5	5	60	–	33	+27	29
3	AIK	22	12	3	7	51	–	34	+17	27
4	Helsingborgs IF	22	9	6	7	46	–	46	0	24
5	IFK Göteborg	22	9	4	9	40	–	33	+7	22
6	GAIS	22	7	6	9	36	–	41	-5	20
7	IS Halmia	22	6	7	9	34	–	41	-7	19
8	Degerfors IF	22	6	7	9	30	–	39	-9	19
9	Jönköpings Södra IF	22	6	7	9	31	–	53	-22	19
10	IF Elfsborg	22	7	4	11	40	–	51	-11	18
11	Djurgårdens IF	22	6	5	11	32	–	35	-3	17
12	Halmstads BK	22	6	5	11	38	–	56	-18	17

=== Division 2 Nordöstra 1947–48 ===

	Team	Pld	W	D	L	GF		GA	GD	Pts
1	Örebro SK	18	12	2	4	44	–	23	+21	26
2	Karlstads BIK	18	12	1	5	43	–	22	+21	25
3	Ludvika FfI	18	10	3	5	42	–	26	+16	23
4	Sandvikens AIK	18	9	4	5	37	–	31	+6	22
5	Reymersholms IK	18	7	5	6	31	–	28	+3	19
6	Surahammars IF	18	7	3	8	28	–	25	+3	17
7	Karlskoga IF	18	7	2	9	30	–	32	-2	16
8	IK Sleipner	18	7	2	9	30	–	39	-9	16
9	Västerås IK	18	5	4	9	21	–	35	-14	14
10	IFK Västerås	18	0	2	16	12	–	57	-45	2

=== Division 2 Sydvästra 1947–48 ===
	Team	Pld	W	D	L	GF		GA	GD	Pts
1	Landskrona BoIS	18	12	3	3	49	–	24	+25	27
2	Örgryte IS	18	11	2	5	51	–	37	+14	24
3	Tidaholms GIF	18	11	0	7	42	–	27	+15	22
4	Åtvidabergs FF	18	9	3	6	47	–	24	+23	21
5	Kalmar FF	18	10	1	7	38	–	20	+18	21
6	IFK Malmö	18	7	5	6	36	–	27	+9	19
7	Höganäs BK	18	6	5	7	45	–	46	-1	17
8	Billingsfors IK	18	5	5	8	27	–	52	-25	15
9	Husqvarna IF	18	4	5	9	35	–	49	-14	13
10	IFK Uddevalla	18	0	1	17	16	–	80	-64	1

=== Norrländska Mästerskapet 1948 ===
Final

June 13, 1948

IFK Holmsund	5–3	Fagerviks GF

Kamratvallen, Holmsund

=== Svenska Cupen 1947 ===
Final

August 24, 1947

Malmö FF	3–2	AIK

Råsunda, Solna

== National team results ==
August 24, 1947
1937–47 Nordic Championship
№ 258

Sweden	7–0	Finland
Liedholm 4', 52'; Nordahl 5', 30', 40'; Gren 9' (p); Turunen 78' (og)

Ryavallen, Borås
Attendance: 20,500
Referee: Asmussen (Denmark)

Sweden: Torsten Lindberg - Thure Grahn, Knut Nordahl - Olle Åhlund, Sven Jacobsson, Rune Emanuelsson - Malte Mårtensson, Gunnar Gren, Gunnar Nordahl, Nils Liedholm, Rolf Svensson.

September 14, 1947
Friendly
№ 259

Sweden	5–4	Poland
Nordahl 15', 56'; Nyström 18'; Tapper 40'; Liedholm 65'		Cieślik 14'; Hogendorf 24'; Gracz 75', 89'

Råsunda, Solna
Attendance: 36,000
Referee: Laursen (Denmark)

Sweden: Torsten Lindberg - Harry Nilsson, Knut Nordahl - Kjell Rosén, Bertil Nordahl, Sune Andersson - Stig Nyström, Börje Tapper, Gunnar Nordahl, Nils Liedholm, Stellan Nilsson.

October 5, 1947
1937–47 Nordic Championship
№ 260

Sweden	4–1	Norway
Liedholm 9'; Nordahl 15', 70'; Gren 71'		Kvammen 41'

Råsunda, Solna
Attendance: 36,134
Referee: Reader (England)

Sweden: Ove Nilsson - Harry Nilsson, Erik Nilsson - Sune Andersson, Bertil Nordahl, Kjell Rosén - Lennart Lindskog, Gunnar Gren, Gunnar Nordahl, Nils Liedholm, Stellan Nilsson.

November 19, 1947
Friendly
№ 261

England	4–2	Sweden
Mortensen 13', 26', 89'; Lawton 20 (p)		Nordahl 22'; Gren 68' (p)

Highbury Stadium, London
Attendance: 44,282
Referee: Webb (Scotland)

Sweden: Torsten Lindberg - Knut Nordahl, Erik Nilsson - Sune Andersson, Bertil Nordahl, Rune Emanuelsson - Malte Mårtensson, Gunnar Gren, Gunnar Nordahl, Nils Liedholm, Stellan Nilsson.

June 9, 1948
Friendly
№ 262

Netherlands	1–0	Sweden
Wilkes 11'

Olympisch Stadion, Amsterdam
Attendance: 63,000
Referee: Jorssen (Belgium)

Sweden: Torsten Lindberg - Knut Nordahl, Erik Nilsson - Sune Andersson, Börje Leander, Kjell Rosén - Henry Carlsson, Gunnar Gren, Gunnar Nordahl, Nils Liedholm, Stellan Nilsson ( Egon Jönsson).

July 11, 1948
Friendly
№ 263

Sweden	3–2	Austria
Liedholm 20'; Gren 32', 89'		Habitzl 4', 65'

Råsunda, Solna
Attendance: 37,000
Referee: Hansen (Denmark)

Sweden: Torsten Lindberg - Knut Nordahl, Erik Nilsson - Birger Rosengren, Bertil Nordahl, Sune Andersson - Kjell Rosén, Gunnar Gren, Gunnar Nordahl, Henry Carlsson, Nils Liedholm.

== National team players in season 1947/48 ==
name	pos.	caps	goals	club
Olle Åhlund	MF	1	0	Degerfors IF
Sune "Mona-Lisa" Andersson	MF	5	0	AIK
Henry "Garvis" Carlsson	FW	2	0	AIK
Rune "Killing" Emanuelsson	MF	2	0	IFK Göteborg
Thure Grahn	DF	1	0	IS Halmia
Gunnar "Il Professore" Gren	FW	5	5	IFK Göteborg
Sven "Jack" Jacobsson	MF	1	0	GAIS
Egon "Hemliga" Jönsson	FW	1	0	Malmö FF
Börje Leander	MF	1	0	AIK
Nils "Lidas"/"Greven" Liedholm	FW	6	5	IFK Norrköping
Torsten "Lindy" Lindberg	GK	5	0	IFK Norrköping
Lennart Lindskog	FW	1	0	Degerfors IF
Malte "Svarta Blixten" Mårtensson	FW	2	0	Hälsingborgs IF
Erik Nilsson	DF	4	0	Malmö FF
Harry Nilsson	DF	2	0	AIK
Ove Nilsson	GK	1	0	Djurgårdens IF
Stellan Nilsson	FW	4	0	Malmö FF
Bertil Nordahl	MF	4	0	Degerfors IF
Gunnar Nordahl	FW	6	8	IFK Norrköping
Knut Nordahl	DF	5	0	IFK Norrköping
Stig Nyström	FW	1	1	Djurgårdens IF
Kjell Rosén	MF/FW	4	0	Malmö FF
Birger "Bian" Rosengren	MF	1	0	IFK Norrköping
Rolf Svensson	FW	1	0	Hälsingborgs IF
Börje Tapper	FW	1	1	Malmö FF
