= 1944–45 in Swedish football =

Association football-related events in Sweden during the 1944–1945 season

The 1944–45 season in Swedish football, starting August 1944 and ending July 1945:

== Honours ==
=== Official titles ===
Title	Team	Reason
Swedish Champions 1944–45	IFK Norrköping	Winners of Allsvenskan
Swedish Cup Champions 1944	Malmö FF	Winners of Svenska Cupen

=== Competitions ===
Level	Competition	Team
1st level	Allsvenskan 1944–45	IFK Norrköping
2nd level	Division 2 Norra 1944–45	Djurgårdens IF
2nd level	Division 2 Östra 1944–45	Åtvidabergs FF
2nd level	Division 2 Västra 1944–45	Tidaholms GIF
2nd level	Division 2 Södra 1944–45	Jönköpings Södra IF
Cup	Svenska Cupen 1944	Malmö FF

== Promotions, relegations and qualifications ==
=== Promotions ===
Promoted from	Promoted to	Team	Reason
Division 2 Norra 1944–45	Allsvenskan 1945–46	Djurgårdens IF	Winners of promotion play-off
Division 2 Södra 1944–45	Allsvenskan 1945–46	Landskrona BoIS	Winners of promotion play-off
Division 3 1944–45	Division 2 Norra 1945–46	Långshyttans AIK	Winners of promotion play-off
Division 3 1944–45	Division 2 Norra 1945–46	Västerås IK	Winners of promotion play-off
Division 3 1944–45	Division 2 Östra 1945–46	BK Derby	Winners of promotion play-off
Division 3 1944–45	Division 2 Östra 1945–46	Hagalunds IS	Winners of promotion play-off
Division 3 1944–45	Division 2 Västra 1945–46	Deje IK	Winners of promotion play-off
Division 3 1944–45	Division 2 Västra 1945–46	Göteborgs FF	Winners of promotion play-off
Division 3 1944–45	Division 2 Södra 1945–46	Kalmar AIK	Winners of promotion play-off
Division 3 1944–45	Division 2 Södra 1945–46	Malmö BI	Winners of promotion play-off

=== League transfers ===
Transferred from	Transferred to	Team	Reason
Division 2 Östra 1944–45	Division 2 Norra 1945–46	IFK Västerås	Geographical composition
Division 2 Norra 1944–45	Division 2 Östra 1945–46	Reymersholms IK	Geographical composition

=== Relegations ===
Relegated from	Relegated to	Team	Reason
Allsvenskan 1944–45	Division 2 Norra 1945–46	Lundvika FfI	11th team
Allsvenskan 1944–45	Division 2 Södra 1945–46	Landskrona BoIS	12th team
Division 2 Norra 1944–45	Division 3 1945–46	Hallstahammars SK	9th team
Division 2 Norra 1944–45	Division 3 1945–46	Gefle IF	10th team
Division 2 Östra 1944–45	Division 3 1945–46	IF Verdandi	9th team
Division 2 Östra 1944–45	Division 3 1945–46	Nyköpings AIK	10th team
Division 2 Västra 1944–45	Division 3 1945–46	IFK Trollhättan	9th team
Division 2 Västra 1944–45	Division 3 1945–46	Skogens IF	10th team
Division 2 Södra 1944–45	Division 3 1945–46	Bromölla IF	9th team
Division 2 Södra 1944–45	Division 3 1945–46	Höganäs BK	10th team

== Domestic results ==
=== Allsvenskan 1944–45 ===

	Team	Pld	W	D	L	GF		GA	GD	Pts
1	IFK Norrköping	22	17	3	2	71	–	23	+48	37
2	IF Elfsborg	22	13	6	3	52	–	31	+21	32
3	Malmö FF	22	12	4	6	58	–	31	+27	28
4	IFK Göteborg	22	12	3	7	57	–	43	+14	27
5	Degerfors IF	22	10	5	7	35	–	32	+3	25
6	GAIS	22	9	3	10	35	–	38	-3	21
7	AIK	22	7	5	10	38	–	38	0	19
8	Halmstads BK	22	8	2	12	33	–	58	-25	18
9	IS Halmia	22	7	2	13	31	–	49	-18	16
10	Helsingborgs IF	22	5	4	13	35	–	56	-21	14
11	Ludvika FfI	22	6	2	14	30	–	56	-26	14
12	Landskrona BoIS	22	4	5	13	38	–	58	-20	13

=== Allsvenskan promotion play-off 1944–45 ===
May 27, 1945

Djurgårdens IF	1–0	Åtvidabergs FF

?, Stockholm
June 3, 1945

Åtvidabergs FF	0–2	Djurgårdens IF

?, Åtvidaberg

May 27, 1945

Jönköpings Södra IF	1–1	Tidaholms GIF

?, Jönköping
June 3, 1945

Tidaholms GIF	2–2	Jönköpings Södra IF

?, Tidaholm
June 10, 1945

Jönköpings Södra IF	4–0	Tidaholms GIF

?, Solna

=== Division 2 Norra 1944–45 ===

	Team	Pld	W	D	L	GF		GA	GD	Pts
1	Djurgårdens IF	18	13	1	4	51	–	20	+31	27
2	Surahammars IF	18	11	1	6	36	–	23	+13	23
3	Reymersholms IK	18	9	3	6	39	–	33	+6	21
4	IK Brage	18	9	1	8	39	–	30	+9	19
5	Sandvikens IF	18	7	3	8	31	–	32	-1	17
6	Sandvikens AIK	18	6	5	7	23	–	30	-7	17
7	Avesta AIK	18	7	2	9	34	–	38	-4	16
8	Ljusne AIK	18	7	2	9	27	–	42	-15	16
9	Hallstahammars SK	18	5	4	9	19	–	28	-9	14
10	Gefle IF	18	3	4	11	28	–	51	-23	10

=== Division 2 Östra 1944–45 ===
	Team	Pld	W	D	L	GF		GA	GD	Pts
1	Åtvidabergs FF	18	14	2	2	65	–	24	+41	30
2	Hammarby IF	18	13	2	3	63	–	25	+38	28
3	IFK Västerås	18	9	3	6	46	–	33	+13	21
4	Sundbybergs IK	18	9	3	6	40	–	43	-3	21
5	IK Sleipner	18	7	6	5	33	–	24	+9	20
6	IFK Eskilstuna	18	6	5	7	36	–	38	-2	17
7	Karlskoga IF	18	5	5	8	28	–	40	-12	15
8	Örebro SK	18	4	6	8	28	–	43	-15	14
9	IF Verdandi	18	3	4	11	21	–	52	-31	10
10	Nyköpings AIK	18	1	2	15	15	–	53	-38	4

=== Division 2 Västra 1944–45 ===
	Team	Pld	W	D	L	GF		GA	GD	Pts
1	Tidaholms GIF	18	14	2	2	62	–	25	+37	30
2	Örgryte IS	18	13	2	3	49	–	29	+20	28
3	Karlstads BIK	18	9	5	4	33	–	21	+12	23
4	IFK Tidaholm	18	8	3	7	36	–	33	+3	19
5	Lundby IF	18	7	4	7	42	–	29	+13	18
6	Gårda BK	18	7	4	7	43	–	44	-1	18
7	Billingsfors IK	18	6	5	7	31	–	37	-6	17
8	IFK Uddevalla	18	4	4	10	29	–	39	-10	12
9	IFK Trollhättan	18	4	2	12	28	–	49	-21	10
10	Skogens IF	18	2	1	15	15	–	62	-47	5

=== Division 2 Södra 1944–45 ===
	Team	Pld	W	D	L	GF		GA	GD	Pts
1	Jönköpings Södra IF	18	18	0	0	92	–	25	+67	36
2	Limhamns IF	18	10	3	5	39	–	39	0	23
3	Kalmar FF	18	9	2	7	31	–	31	0	20
4	Nybro IF	18	9	1	8	49	–	46	+3	19
5	IFK Malmö	18	8	1	9	47	–	47	0	17
6	Blomstermåla IK	18	7	3	8	23	–	44	-21	17
7	Husqvarna IF	18	5	5	8	42	–	48	-6	15
8	Alets IK	18	5	3	10	24	–	38	-14	13
9	Bromölla IF	18	4	4	10	39	–	51	-12	12
10	Höganäs BK	18	3	2	13	32	–	49	-17	8

=== Division 2 promotion play-off 1944–45 ===
1st round

May 13, 1945

Västerås IK	3–1	IF Vesta

?, ?
May 21, 1945

IF Vesta	2–2	Västerås IK

?, ?

May 13, 1945

Munkedals IF	1–4	IFK Åmål

?, ?
May 21, 1945

IFK Åmål	3–1	Munkedals IF

?, ?

2nd round

May 27, 1945

Långshyttans AIK	1–0	Alfta GIF

?, ?
June 3, 1945

Alfta GIF	2–1	Långshyttans AIK

?, ?
June 10, 1945

Långshyttans AIK	1–0	Alfta GIF

?, ?

May 27, 1945

Hagalunds IS	11–1	Södra BK

?, ?
June 3, 1945

Södra BK	1–5	Hagalunds IS

?, ?

May 27, 1945

IFK Nora	2–5	Västerås IK

?, ?
June 3, 1945

Västerås IK	5–0	IFK Nora

?, ?

May 27, 1945

IFK Åmål	1–1	Deje IK

?, ?
June 3, 1945

Deje IK	1–0	IFK Åmål

?, ?

May 27, 1945

Göteborgs FF	0–2	Trollhättans IF

?, ?
June 3, 1945

Trollhättans IF	1–2	Göteborgs FF

?, ?
June 10, 1945

Göteborgs FF	2–1	Trollhättans IF

?, ?

May 27, 1945

Falkenbergs FF	3–4	Malmö BI

?, ?
June 3, 1945

Malmö BI	6–2	Falkenbergs FF

?, ?

May 27, 1945

IFK Värnamo	0–0	BK Derby

?, ?
June 3, 1945

BK Derby	5–1	IFK Värnamo

?, ?

May 27, 1945

Olofströms IF	1–1	Kalmar AIK

?, ?
June 3, 1945

Kalmar AIK	3–1	Olofströms IF

?, ?

=== Svenska Cupen 1944 ===
Final

October 1, 1944

Malmö FF	3–3 4–3 (aet)	IFK Norrköping

Råsunda, Solna

== National team results ==
June 24, 1945
Friendly
№ 243

Sweden	2–1	Denmark
Nordahl 24'; Holmqvist 80'		Søbirk 12'

Råsunda, Solna
Attendance: 35,651
Referee: Daehlen (Norway)

Sweden: Gustav Sjöberg - Harry Nilsson, Gösta Malm - Olle Åhlund, Arvid Emanuelsson, Karl-Erik Grahn - Arne Nyberg, Gunnar Gren, Gunnar Nordahl, Erik Holmqvist, Stellan Nilsson.

July 1, 1945
Friendly
№ 244

Denmark	3–4	Sweden
K. A. Hansen 27', 56'; K. Hansen 41'		Åhlund 25', 47' (p); Nordahl 37'; Gren 87'

Idrætsparken, Copenhagen
Attendance: 39,000
Referee: Nordbø (Norway)

Sweden: Gustav Sjöberg - Harry Nilsson, Gösta Malm - Olle Åhlund, Arvid Emanuelsson, Karl-Erik Grahn - Arne Nyberg, Gunnar Gren, Gunnar Nordahl, Carl-Erik Sandberg, Stellan Nilsson.

== National team players in season 1944/45 ==
name	pos.	caps	goals	club
Olle Åhlund	MF	2	2	Degerfors IF
Arvid "Emma" Emanuelsson	MF	2	0	IF Elfsborg
Karl-Erik Grahn	MF	2	0	IF Elfsborg
Gunnar Gren	FW	2	1	IFK Göteborg
Erik "Mulle" Holmqvist	FW	1	1	IFK Norrköping
Gösta Malm	DF	2	0	IFK Norrköping
Harry Nilsson	DF	2	0	AIK
Stellan Nilsson	FW	2	0	Malmö FF
Gunnar Nordahl	FW	2	2	IFK Norrköping
Arne Nyberg	FW	2	0	IFK Göteborg
Carl-Erik "Pigge" Sandberg	FW	1	0	Malmö FF
Gustav "Gurra" Sjöberg	GK	2	0	AIK
