= 1945–46 Division 3 (Swedish football) =

Swedish League Division 3
- Season: 1945–46
- Champions: Iggesunds IK; Forssa BK; Forsbacka IK; IFK Lidingö; Enköpings SK; Hallstahammars SK; IK City; IFK Bofors; IF Viken; Kungshamns IF; Finspångs AIK; IFK Värnamo; Västerviks AIS; Olofströms IF; IFK Trollhättan; Jonsereds IF; Varbergs BoIS; Höganäs BK
- Promoted: 8 teams
- Relegated: 44 teams

Statistics of Swedish football Division 3 for the 1945–46 season.

== League standings ==
=== Uppsvenska Sydöstra 1945–46 ===
Pos	Team	Pld	W	D	L	GF	GA	GD	Pts	Promotion or relegation
1	Iggesunds IK	18	13	2	3	64	19	+45	28	Promotion Playoffs – Promoted
2	Hudiksvalls IF	18	11	3	4	45	22	+23	25	
3	Strömsbruks IF	18	9	4	5	44	27	+17	22	
4	Strands IF, Hudiksvall	18	9	2	7	43	37	+6	20	
5	Alfta GIF	18	8	3	7	39	38	+1	19	
6	Ljusdals IF	18	8	2	8	34	32	+2	18	
7	Bollnäs GIF	18	7	1	10	28	59	−31	15	
8	Söderhamns Skärgårds IF	18	6	1	11	43	53	−10	13	
9	Söderhamns IF	18	4	2	12	26	41	−15	10	Relegated
10	Stocka IK	18	3	4	11	22	60	−38	10	Relegated

=== Uppsvenska Sydvästra 1945–46 ===
Pos	Team	Pld	W	D	L	GF	GA	GD	Pts	Qualification or relegation
1	Forssa BK	18	13	2	3	59	27	+32	28	Promotion Playoffs
2	IK Heros, Smedjebacken	18	12	1	5	39	25	+14	25	
3	Falu BS, Falun	18	12	0	6	45	23	+22	24	
4	Malungs IF	18	9	2	7	29	27	+2	20	
5	IFK Mora	18	8	3	7	39	27	+12	19	
6	Leksands IF	18	9	1	8	42	38	+4	19	
7	Islingby IK	18	7	0	11	42	48	−6	14	
8	IFK Hedemora	18	6	1	11	29	54	−25	13	
9	Avesta IF	18	4	2	12	23	48	−25	10	Relegated
10	Vansbro AIK	18	3	2	13	21	51	−30	8	Relegated

=== Östsvenska Norra 1945–46 ===
Pos	Team	Pld	W	D	L	GF	GA	GD	Pts	Qualification or relegation
1	Forsbacka IK	18	12	3	3	62	22	+40	27	Promotion Playoffs
2	Skutskärs IF	18	11	3	4	44	24	+20	25	
3	Hofors AIF	18	10	2	6	62	27	+35	22	
4	Valbo AIF	18	8	5	5	40	38	+2	21	
5	IFK Gävle	18	9	2	7	29	31	−2	20	
6	Brynäs IF, Gävle	18	8	3	7	38	41	−3	19	
7	Högbo AIK	18	6	3	9	20	30	−10	15	
8	Gefle IF, Gävle	18	5	5	8	29	43	−14	15	
9	Örtakoloniens IF, Sandviken	18	5	3	10	36	52	−16	13	Relegated
10	Södra BK, Gävle	18	0	3	15	19	71	−52	3	Relegated

=== Östsvenska Södra 1945–46 ===
Pos	Team	Pld	W	D	L	GF	GA	GD	Pts	Promotion or relegation
1	IFK Lidingö	18	13	2	3	53	17	+36	28	Promotion Playoffs – Promoted
2	Värtans IK, Stockholm	18	11	4	3	65	25	+40	26	
3	Nynäshamns IF	18	10	4	4	50	28	+22	24	
4	IK Sture, Stockholm	18	10	4	4	48	37	+11	24	
5	Mälarhöjdens IK	18	9	1	8	45	31	+14	19	
6	Spånga IS	18	8	3	7	44	41	+3	19	
7	Årsta SK, Stockholm	18	8	2	8	44	29	+15	18	
8	Vasalunds IF, Solna	18	6	5	7	33	41	−8	17	
9	IF Olympia, Stockholm	18	1	1	16	18	68	−50	3	Relegated
10	Enskede IK	18	0	2	16	10	93	−83	2	Relegated

=== Centralserien Norra, Uppland 1945–46 ===
Pos	Team	Pld	W	D	L	GF	GA	GD	Pts	Promotion or relegation
1	Enköpings SK	18	13	2	3	53	20	+33	28	Promotion Playoffs – Promoted
2	IK Sirius, Uppsala	18	12	3	3	41	23	+18	27	
3	IF Vesta, Uppsala	18	13	0	5	58	28	+30	26	
4	Väsby IK, Upplands-Väsby	18	8	2	8	40	43	−3	18	
5	Södertälje SK	18	6	5	7	52	57	−5	17	
6	Heby AIF	18	7	3	8	31	42	−11	17	
7	Lunda SK, Märsta	18	7	2	9	41	39	+2	16	Relegated
8	Gröndals IK	18	5	4	9	40	47	−7	14	Relegated
9	Väddö IF	18	4	1	13	21	55	−34	9	Relegated
10	Gimo IF	18	3	2	13	33	59	−26	8	Relegated

=== Centralserien Norra, Västmanland 1945–46 ===
Pos	Team	Pld	W	D	L	GF	GA	GD	Pts	Qualification or relegation
1	Hallstahammars SK	18	13	3	2	61	19	+42	29	Promotion Playoffs
2	Västerås SK	18	10	4	4	39	27	+12	24	
3	IFK Arboga	18	10	1	7	45	31	+14	21	
4	Kolsva IF	18	8	5	5	37	39	−2	21	
5	Fagersta AIK	18	9	1	8	45	43	+2	19	
6	Riddarhytte SK	18	6	3	9	39	45	−6	15	
7	Skultuna IS	18	5	5	8	29	37	−8	15	Relegated
8	Köpings IS	18	6	2	10	32	33	−1	14	Relegated
9	Sörstafors SK	18	3	5	10	29	52	−23	11	Relegated
10	IF Rune, Kungsör	18	5	1	12	23	53	−30	11	Relegated

=== Centralserien Södra 1945–46 ===
Pos	Team	Pld	W	D	L	GF	GA	GD	Pts	Qualification or relegation
1	IK City, Eskilstuna	18	13	1	4	46	26	+20	27	Promotion Playoffs
2	IF Verdandi, Eskilstuna	18	12	2	4	51	19	+32	26	
3	IFK Hallsberg	18	8	4	6	45	42	+3	20	
4	IFK Nora	18	8	3	7	35	47	−12	19	
5	Örebro IK	18	8	2	8	45	47	−2	18	
6	Frövi IK	18	6	4	8	47	48	−1	16	
7	IF Svea, Eskilstuna	18	7	2	9	38	40	−2	16	Relegated
8	IFK Lindesberg	18	7	2	9	39	42	−3	16	Relegated
9	Tunafors SK, Eskilstuna	18	6	0	12	32	52	−20	12	Relegated
10	IFK Kumla	18	3	4	11	35	50	−15	10	Relegated

=== Nordvästra Norra 1945–46 ===
Pos	Team	Pld	W	D	L	GF	GA	GD	Pts	Qualification or relegation
1	IFK Bofors	18	14	2	2	50	22	+28	30	Promotion Playoffs
2	Arvika BK	18	12	0	6	61	37	+24	24	
3	IK Viking, Hagfors	18	9	2	7	63	40	+23	20	
4	IFK Munkfors	18	8	3	7	51	44	+7	19	
5	IFK Kristinehamn	18	9	1	8	46	47	−1	19	
6	Hällefors AIF	18	8	3	7	44	49	−5	19	
7	Skoghalls IF	18	9	0	9	44	44	0	18	
8	IFK Sunne	18	5	5	8	47	57	−10	15	
9	IF Örnen, Kristinehamn	18	2	4	12	40	73	−33	8	Relegated
10	Storfors FF	18	3	2	13	32	65	−33	8	Relegated

=== Nordvästra Södra, Dalsland 1945–46 ===
Pos	Team	Pld	W	D	L	GF	GA	GD	Pts	Promotion or relegation
1	IF Viken, Åmål	14	13	0	1	57	13	+44	26	Promotion Playoffs – Promoted
2	Mustadfors IF	14	10	0	4	54	21	+33	20	
3	IFK Åmål	14	8	1	5	44	23	+21	17	
4	SK Sifhälla, Säffle	14	7	0	7	32	36	−4	14	
5	Fengersfors IK	14	5	2	7	18	33	−15	12	
6	Melleruds IF	14	4	2	8	25	49	−24	10	Relegated
7	Håfreströms IF	14	4	1	9	35	43	−8	9	Relegated
8	Färgelanda IF	14	1	2	11	10	57	−47	4	Relegated

=== Nordvästra Södra, Bohus 1945–46 ===
Pos	Team	Pld	W	D	L	GF	GA	GD	Pts	Qualification or relegation
1	Kungshamns IF	14	11	1	2	57	24	+33	23	Promotion Playoffs
2	IK Kongahälla, Kungälv	14	8	2	4	26	22	+4	18	
3	Uddevalla IS	14	8	1	5	28	18	+10	17	
4	Munkedals IF	14	7	1	6	35	28	+7	15	
5	Lysekils FF	14	7	1	6	32	36	−4	15	
6	IK Svane	14	6	1	7	27	23	+4	13	Relegated
7	IFK Kungälv	14	2	2	10	13	32	−19	6	Relegated
8	IFK Strömstad	14	2	1	11	24	59	−35	5	Relegated

=== Mellansvenska Norra 1945–46 ===
Pos	Team	Pld	W	D	L	GF	GA	GD	Pts	Qualification or relegation
1	Finspångs AIK	18	11	3	4	49	27	+22	25	Promotion Playoffs
2	Motala AIF	18	10	4	4	42	22	+20	24	
3	Karle IF	18	8	4	6	46	30	+16	20	
4	BK Kenty, Linköping	18	6	6	6	31	35	−4	18	
5	Mjölby AIF	18	8	2	8	36	42	−6	18	
6	Katrineholms AIK	18	7	2	9	37	40	−3	16	
7	Skärblacka IF	18	5	5	8	36	44	−8	15	
8	Taborsbergs SK	18	7	1	10	38	48	−10	15	
9	Nyköpings AIK	18	5	5	8	28	39	−11	15	Relegated
10	BK Hird, Norrköping	18	4	6	8	26	44	−18	14	Relegated

=== Mellansvenska Södra 1945–46 ===
Pos	Team	Pld	W	D	L	GF	GA	GD	Pts	Promotion or relegation
1	IFK Värnamo	18	14	0	4	62	22	+40	28	Promotion Playoffs – Promoted
2	Huskvarna Södra IS	18	11	3	4	57	32	+25	25	
3	Nässjö IF	18	12	0	6	60	40	+20	24	
4	Växjö BK	18	8	5	5	42	33	+9	21	
5	IF Hallby, Jönköping	18	8	3	7	56	42	+14	19	
6	Gnosjö IF	18	7	2	9	37	35	+2	16	
7	IK Tord, Jönköping	18	7	1	10	48	62	−14	15	
8	Skillingaryds IS	18	6	1	11	46	69	−23	13	
9	Alvesta GIF	18	5	1	12	35	48	−13	11	
10	Tranås AIF	18	3	2	13	21	82	−61	8	Relegated

=== Sydöstra Norra 1945–46 ===
Pos	Team	Pld	W	D	L	GF	GA	GD	Pts	Qualification or relegation
1	Västerviks AIS	14	11	2	1	48	14	+34	24	Promotion Playoffs
2	Oskarshamns AIK	14	8	4	2	49	31	+18	20	
3	IFK Oskarshamn	14	6	3	5	47	42	+5	15	
4	Hvetlanda GIF, Vetlanda	14	6	2	6	46	47	−1	14	
5	Hultsfreds AIK	14	6	1	7	29	44	−15	13	
6	Överums IK	14	4	2	8	34	46	−12	10	
7	Norrhults BK	14	3	2	9	42	54	−12	8	
8	Målilla GIF	14	2	4	8	31	48	−17	8	Relegated

=== Sydöstra Södra 1945–46 ===
Pos	Team	Pld	W	D	L	GF	GA	GD	Pts	Promotion or relegation
1	Olofströms IF	18	14	2	2	68	23	+45	30	Promotion Playoffs – Promoted
2	Bromölla IF	18	12	6	0	61	24	+37	30	
3	IFK Karlskrona	18	8	5	5	38	33	+5	21	
4	IFK Karlshamn	18	7	6	5	39	31	+8	20	
5	Karlskrona BK	18	9	1	8	36	42	−6	19	
6	Högadals IS	18	8	1	9	48	47	+1	17	
7	Lessebo GIF	18	7	2	9	32	42	−10	16	
8	Karlshamns FF	18	4	2	12	38	65	−27	10	
9	Kallinge SK	18	3	3	12	30	49	−19	9	Relegated
10	Hovmantorps GIF	18	3	2	13	26	60	−34	8	Relegated

=== Västsvenska Norra 1945–46 ===
Pos	Team	Pld	W	D	L	GF	GA	GD	Pts	Promotion or relegation
1	IFK Trollhättan	18	13	3	2	52	22	+30	29	Promotion Playoffs – Promoted
2	Skene IF	18	10	3	5	68	31	+37	23	
3	Trollhättans IF	18	10	3	5	54	29	+25	23	
4	Norrbygärde IF	18	10	3	5	45	27	+18	23	
5	Skara IF	18	5	6	7	46	44	+2	16	
6	IF Heimer, Lidköping	18	5	6	7	27	39	−12	16	
7	Fritsla IF	18	5	5	8	24	50	−26	15	
8	Alingsås IF	18	6	3	9	29	58	−29	15	
9	Kinna IF	18	4	4	10	32	45	−13	12	Relegated
10	IFK Falköping	18	1	6	11	19	51	−32	8	Relegated

=== Västsvenska Södra 1945–46 ===
Pos	Team	Pld	W	D	L	GF	GA	GD	Pts	Qualification or relegation
1	Jonsereds IF	18	15	0	3	70	26	+44	30	Promotion Playoffs
2	Krokslätts FF, Mölndal	18	12	4	2	62	33	+29	28	
3	Mölnlycke IF	18	8	4	6	40	31	+9	20	
4	Majornas IK, Göteborg	18	9	2	7	44	36	+8	20	
5	Hisingstads IS, Hisingen	18	8	2	8	35	36	−1	18	
6	Sandarna BK, Göteborg	18	6	5	7	31	40	−9	17	
7	Lindholmens BK, Göteborg	18	5	5	8	31	36	−5	15	
8	Skogens IF, Göteborg	18	6	1	11	29	37	−8	13	Relegated
9	IK Virgo, Göteborg	18	5	3	10	34	57	−23	13	Relegated
10	Bagaregårdens IK, Göteborg	18	3	0	15	16	60	−44	6	Relegated

=== Sydsvenska Norra 1945–46 ===
Pos	Team	Pld	W	D	L	GF	GA	GD	Pts	Qualification or relegation
1	Varbergs BoIS	18	13	2	3	44	18	+26	28	Promotion Playoffs
2	Falkenbergs FF	18	12	1	5	58	27	+31	25	
3	IFK Kungsbacka	18	8	3	7	36	32	+4	19	
4	Varbergs GIF	18	8	3	7	33	31	+2	19	
5	IF Leikin, Halmstad	18	8	2	8	30	35	−5	18	
6	Laholms BK	18	8	1	9	33	45	−12	17	
7	Nyhems BK, Halmstad	18	5	5	8	27	32	−5	15	
8	Hyltebruks IF	18	5	4	9	35	49	−14	14	
9	IS Örnia, Halmstad	18	6	1	11	41	46	−5	13	Relegated
10	IFK Varberg	18	5	2	11	26	48	−22	12	Relegated

=== Sydsvenska Södra 1945–46 ===
Pos	Team	Pld	W	D	L	GF	GA	GD	Pts	Promotion or relegation
1	Höganäs BK	18	13	3	2	49	18	+31	29	Promotion Playoffs – Promoted
2	Råå IF	18	10	3	5	43	30	+13	23	
3	Lunds BK	18	10	1	7	40	31	+9	21	
4	Kävlinge GIF	18	9	2	7	29	27	+2	20	
5	IFK Trelleborg	18	7	3	8	23	28	−5	17	
6	Eskilsminne IF, Hälsingborg	18	6	4	8	34	38	−4	16	
7	Klippans BoIF	18	6	3	9	40	39	+1	15	
8	BK Drott, Hälsingborg	18	5	5	8	30	29	+1	15	
9	Högaborgs BK, Hälsingborg	18	7	1	10	24	36	−12	15	Relegated
10	IFK Kristianstad	18	3	3	12	19	55	−36	9	Relegated
