= 1944–45 Division 3 (Swedish football) =

Swedish League Division 3
- Season: 1944–45
- Champions: Alfta GIF; Långshyttans AIK; Södra BK; Hagalunds IS; IF Vesta; Västerås IK; IFK Nora; Deje IK; IFK Åmål; Munkedals IF; BK Derby; IFK Värnamo; Kalmar AIK; Olofströms IF; Trollhättans IF; Göteborgs FF; Falkenbergs FF; Malmö BI
- Promoted: 8 teams
- Relegated: 33 teams

Statistics of Swedish football Division 3 for the 1944–45 season.

== League standings ==
=== Uppsvenska Sydöstra 1944–45 ===
Pos	Team	Pld	W	D	L	GF	GA	GD	Pts	Qualification or relegation
1	Alfta GIF	18	10	5	3	36	23	+13	25	Promotion Playoffs
2	Iggesunds IK	18	9	3	6	56	36	+20	21	
3	Strömsbruks IF	18	8	5	5	45	37	+8	21	
4	Söderhamns IF	18	9	3	6	44	39	+5	21	
5	Strands IF, Hudiksvall	18	7	5	6	55	45	+10	19	
6	Ljusdals IF	18	7	4	7	33	30	+3	18	
7	Hudiksvalls IF	18	6	5	7	36	49	−13	17	
8	Bollnäs GIF	18	6	4	8	34	39	−5	16	
9	IFK Bergvik	18	6	3	9	48	42	+6	15	Relegated
10	Delsbo IF	18	1	5	12	25	72	−47	7	Relegated

=== Uppsvenska Sydvästra 1944–45 ===
Pos	Team	Pld	W	D	L	GF	GA	GD	Pts	Promotion or relegation
1	Långshyttans AIK	18	11	5	2	54	23	+31	27	Promotion Playoffs – Promoted
2	IFK Mora	18	10	5	3	50	30	+20	25	
3	Avesta IF	18	9	4	5	53	38	+15	22	
4	Malungs IF	18	9	1	8	40	34	+6	19	
5	Islingby IK	18	7	5	6	47	44	+3	19	
6	Forssa BK	18	7	5	6	26	33	−7	19	
7	Falu BS, Falun	18	7	3	8	42	32	+10	17	
8	Vansbro AIK	18	4	6	8	27	41	−14	14	
9	IFK Grängesberg	18	3	4	11	19	56	−37	10	Relegated
10	Sollerö IF	18	2	4	12	25	53	−28	8	Relegated

=== Östsvenska Norra 1944–45 ===
Pos	Team	Pld	W	D	L	GF	GA	GD	Pts	Qualification or relegation
1	Södra BK, Gävle	18	11	2	5	38	24	+14	24	Promotion Playoffs
2	Brynäs IF, Gävle	18	11	2	5	35	24	+11	24	
3	Valbo AIF	18	9	3	6	40	28	+12	21	
4	Skutskärs IF	18	9	2	7	45	36	+9	20	
5	Hofors AIF	18	8	3	7	44	31	+13	19	
6	IFK Gävle	18	8	3	7	45	41	+4	19	
7	Örtakoloniens IF, Sandviken	18	6	5	7	26	27	−1	17	
8	Högbo AIK	18	6	4	8	26	25	+1	16	
9	Örbyhus IF	18	6	3	9	37	42	−5	15	Relegated
10	IK Huge, Gävle	18	2	1	15	27	85	−58	5	Relegated

=== Östsvenska Södra 1944–45 ===
Pos	Team	Pld	W	D	L	GF	GA	GD	Pts	Promotion or relegation
1	Hagalunds IS, Solna	18	16	0	2	71	17	+54	32	Promotion Playoffs – Promoted
2	Nynäshamns IF	18	13	3	2	61	23	+38	29	
3	IFK Lidingö	18	7	5	6	35	38	−3	19	
4	Vasalunds IF, Solna	18	7	3	8	26	35	−9	17	
5	Årsta SK, Stockholm	18	7	2	9	43	41	+2	16	
6	Enskede IK	18	7	2	9	25	37	−12	16	
7	Mälarhöjdens IK	18	5	6	7	38	53	−15	16	
8	Spånga IS	18	5	5	8	31	31	0	15	
9	Eriksdals IF, Stockholm	18	5	5	8	33	41	−8	15	Relegated
10	IF Triangeln, Stockholm	18	2	1	15	18	65	−47	5	Relegated

=== Centralserien Norra, Uppland 1944–45 ===
Pos	Team	Pld	W	D	L	GF	GA	GD	Pts	Qualification or relegation
1	IF Vesta, Uppsala	18	14	3	1	59	24	+35	31	Promotion Playoffs
2	Enköpings SK	18	15	1	2	60	27	+33	31	
3	IF Olympia, Stockholm	18	8	4	6	41	32	+9	20	
4	Lunda SK, Märsta	18	10	0	8	38	36	+2	20	
5	Heby AIF	18	8	1	9	50	46	+4	17	
6	Gimo IF	18	8	1	9	44	51	−7	17	
7	Gröndals IK	18	7	1	10	36	48	−12	15	
8	Väsby IK, Upplands-Väsby	18	6	1	11	43	61	−18	13	
9	Morgongåva SK	18	4	4	10	41	45	−4	12	Relegated
10	Skyttorps IK	18	1	2	15	31	73	−42	4	Relegated

=== Centralserien Norra, Västmanland 1944–45 ===
Pos	Team	Pld	W	D	L	GF	GA	GD	Pts	Promotion or relegation
1	Västerås IK	18	15	1	2	91	15	+76	31	Promotion Playoffs – Promoted
2	IF Rune, Kungsör	18	12	2	4	51	27	+24	26	
3	Kolsva IF	18	9	3	6	44	31	+13	21	
4	Köpings IS	18	7	6	5	37	31	+6	20	
5	Västerås SK	18	9	2	7	44	42	+2	20	
6	Fagersta AIK	18	9	1	8	37	35	+2	19	
7	IFK Arboga	18	8	2	8	39	43	−4	18	
8	Riddarhytte SK	18	6	5	7	38	41	−3	17	
9	Ramnäs IF	18	1	3	14	28	68	−40	5	Relegated
10	Skinnskattebergs SK	18	0	3	15	24	100	−76	3	Relegated

=== Centralserien Södra 1944–45 ===
Pos	Team	Pld	W	D	L	GF	GA	GD	Pts	Qualification or relegation
1	IFK Nora	18	14	0	4	38	24	+14	28	Promotion Playoffs
2	IK City, Eskilstuna	18	11	3	4	51	27	+24	25	
3	IFK Lindesberg	18	8	4	6	38	34	+4	20	
4	Örebro IK	18	8	4	6	35	31	+4	20	
5	IFK Kumla	18	7	5	6	33	33	0	19	
6	Tunafors SK, Eskilstuna	18	7	4	7	29	27	+2	18	
7	Frövi IK	18	8	2	8	47	49	−2	18	
8	IF Svea, Eskilstuna	18	5	3	10	27	33	−6	13	
9	Östermalms IS, Eskilstuna	18	5	1	12	40	45	−5	11	Relegated
10	BK Forward, Örebro	18	3	2	13	23	58	−35	8	Relegated

=== Nordvästra Norra 1944–45 ===
Pos	Team	Pld	W	D	L	GF	GA	GD	Pts	Promotion or relegation
1	Deje IK	18	15	2	1	70	20	+50	32	Promotion Playoffs – Promoted
2	IFK Bofors	18	11	3	4	56	33	+23	25	
3	IK Viking, Bofors	18	11	2	5	48	33	+15	24	
4	Munkeruds AIS	18	11	0	7	57	43	+14	22	
5	IFK Kristinehamn	18	8	4	6	45	32	+13	20	
6	Arvika BK	18	8	0	10	48	38	+10	16	
7	Hällefors AIF	18	6	3	9	39	52	−13	15	
8	Skoghalls IF	18	6	2	10	39	52	−13	14	
9	IF Örnen, Kristinehamn	18	6	0	12	35	54	−19	12	
10	Torsby IF	18	0	0	18	16	96	−80	0	Relegated

=== Nordvästra Södra, Dalsland 1944–45 ===
Pos	Team	Pld	W	D	L	GF	GA	GD	Pts	Qualification or relegation
1	IFK Åmål	14	11	2	1	51	20	+31	24	Promotion Playoffs
2	IF Viken, Åmål	14	9	3	2	37	14	+23	21	
3	Mustadfors IF	14	8	2	4	48	27	+21	18	
4	SK Sifhälla, Säffle	14	6	2	6	34	24	+10	14	
5	Färgelanda IF	14	5	0	9	22	39	−17	10	
6	Melleruds IF	14	4	1	9	25	42	−17	9	
7	Fengersfors IK	14	3	2	9	22	47	−25	8	
8	Stigens IF	14	3	2	9	20	46	−26	8	Relegated

=== Nordvästra Södra, Bohus 1944–45 ===
Pos	Team	Pld	W	D	L	GF	GA	GD	Pts	Qualification or relegation
1	Munkedals IF	14	9	3	2	53	29	+24	21	Promotion Playoffs
2	IK Kongahälla, Kungälv	14	8	2	4	28	24	+4	18	
3	Lysekils FF	14	7	2	5	53	36	+17	16	
4	Kungshamns IF	14	6	2	6	34	29	+5	14	
5	Uddevalla IS	14	6	1	7	34	29	+5	13	
6	IFK Kungälv	14	4	4	6	32	44	−12	12	
7	Fjällbacka IK	14	3	3	8	37	45	−8	9	Relegated
8	Hunnebostrands GIF	14	3	3	8	24	59	−35	9	Relegated

=== Mellansvenska Norra 1944–45 ===
Pos	Team	Pld	W	D	L	GF	GA	GD	Pts	Promotion or relegation
1	BK Derby, Linköping	18	15	3	0	63	15	+48	33	Promotion Playoffs – Promoted
2	Taborsbergs SK	18	13	3	2	60	26	+34	29	
3	Motala AIF	18	10	3	5	47	27	+20	23	
4	Mjölby AIF	18	8	4	6	35	35	0	20	
5	Katrineholms AIK	18	8	2	8	37	38	−1	18	
6	Finspångs AIK	18	5	4	9	26	41	−15	14	
7	Karle IF	18	6	2	10	38	55	−17	14	
8	Skärblacka IF	18	6	2	10	32	50	−18	14	
9	Katrineholms SK	18	3	2	13	19	50	−31	8	Relegated
10	BK Zeros, Motala	18	3	1	14	33	53	−20	7	Relegated

=== Mellansvenska Södra 1944–45 ===
Pos	Team	Pld	W	D	L	GF	GA	GD	Pts	Qualification or relegation
1	IFK Värnamo	18	10	6	2	51	31	+20	26	Promotion Playoffs
2	Nässjö IF	18	11	3	4	51	29	+22	25	
3	Huskvarna Södra IS	18	12	1	5	57	37	+20	25	
4	Gnosjö IF	18	9	4	5	52	39	+13	22	
5	IF Hallby, Jönköping	18	10	1	7	49	35	+14	21	
6	Tranås AIF	18	7	4	7	42	45	−3	18	
7	Växjö BK	18	5	5	8	45	59	−14	15	
8	IK Tord, Jönköping	18	6	2	10	35	49	−14	14	
9	Ljungby IF	18	2	6	10	30	49	−19	10	Relegated
10	Gislaveds IS	18	1	2	15	32	71	−39	4	Relegated

=== Sydöstra Norra 1944–45 ===
Pos	Team	Pld	W	D	L	GF	GA	GD	Pts	Promotion or relegation
1	Kalmar AIK	14	13	0	1	84	28	+56	26	Promotion Playoffs – Promoted
2	IFK Oskarshamn	14	10	3	1	62	28	+34	23	
3	Hvetlanda GIF, Vetlanda	14	5	3	6	25	35	−10	13	
4	Målilla GIF	14	5	2	7	22	45	−23	12	
5	Hultsfreds AIK	14	4	3	7	32	45	−13	11	
6	Oskarshamns AIK	14	4	2	8	31	34	−3	10	
7	Västerviks AIS	14	4	1	9	26	44	−18	9	
8	IF Hebe, Silverdalen	14	2	4	8	26	49	−23	8	Relegated

=== Sydöstra Södra 1944–45 ===
Pos	Team	Pld	W	D	L	GF	GA	GD	Pts	Qualification or relegation
1	Olofströms IF	18	15	1	2	68	20	+48	31	Promotion Playoffs
2	Högadals IS	18	13	1	4	53	36	+17	27	
3	Hovmantorps GIF	18	9	3	6	40	46	−6	21	
4	Lessebo GIF	18	9	2	7	50	33	+17	20	
5	Karlskrona BK	18	7	4	7	40	33	+7	18	
6	IFK Karlskrona	18	7	1	10	28	42	−14	15	
7	IFK Karlshamn	18	5	3	10	20	35	−15	13	
8	Kallinge SK	18	4	4	10	27	58	−31	12	
9	Pantarholmens SK	18	5	1	12	21	46	−25	11	Relegated
10	Sölvesborgs GIF	18	5	0	13	25	23	+2	10	Relegated

=== Västsvenska Norra 1944–45 ===
Pos	Team	Pld	W	D	L	GF	GA	GD	Pts	Qualification or relegation
1	Trollhättans IF	18	11	5	2	42	16	+26	27	Promotion Playoffs
2	Norrbygärde IF	18	10	4	4	54	22	+32	24	
3	Fritsla IF	18	10	2	6	42	40	+2	22	
4	Skene IF	18	10	1	7	50	38	+12	21	
5	Skara IF	18	8	4	6	41	46	−5	20	
6	IF Heimer, Lidköping	18	7	5	6	39	33	+6	19	
7	Kinna IF	18	7	0	11	31	38	−7	14	
8	Alingsås IF	18	5	3	10	37	56	−19	13	
9	Skövde AIK	18	3	4	11	28	51	−23	10	Relegated
10	Mariestads BK	18	3	1	14	33	57	−24	7	Relegated

=== Västsvenska Södra 1944–45 ===
Pos	Team	Pld	W	D	L	GF	GA	GD	Pts	Promotion or relegation
1	Göteborgs FF	18	13	2	3	41	17	+24	28	Promotion Playoffs – Promoted
2	Lindholmens BK, Göteborg	18	11	5	2	39	23	+16	27	
3	Jonsereds IF	18	10	4	4	50	31	+19	24	
4	Majornas IK, Göteborg	18	10	2	6	56	38	+18	22	
5	IK VIrgo, Göteborg	18	9	2	7	48	44	+4	20	
6	Mölnlycke IF	18	7	4	7	45	41	+4	18	
7	Krokslätts FF, Mölndal	18	6	1	11	37	41	−4	13	
8	Hisingstads IS, Hisingen	18	5	3	10	24	37	−13	13	
9	Partille IF	18	4	2	12	28	64	−36	10	Relegated
10	Marieholms BIK, Göteborg	18	2	1	15	18	50	−32	5	Relegated

=== Sydsvenska Norra 1944–45 ===
Pos	Team	Pld	W	D	L	GF	GA	GD	Pts	Qualification or relegation
1	Falkenbergs FF	18	12	2	4	56	21	+35	26	Promotion Playoffs
2	Varbergs BoIS	18	11	3	4	43	17	+26	25	
3	Hyltebruks IF	18	12	1	5	45	33	+12	25	
4	Varbergs GIF	18	8	4	6	31	38	−7	20	
5	IF Leikin, Halmstad	18	7	5	6	37	40	−3	19	
6	IS Örnia, Halmstad	18	6	5	7	42	30	+12	17	
7	IFK Kungsbacka	18	6	4	8	37	39	−2	16	
8	Nyhems BK, Halmstad	18	5	4	9	23	37	−14	14	
9	Långås IF	18	4	3	11	24	52	−28	11	Relegated
10	Morups IF	18	3	1	14	23	54	−31	7	Relegated

=== Sydsvenska Södra 1944–45 ===
Pos	Team	Pld	W	D	L	GF	GA	GD	Pts	Promotion or relegation
1	Malmö BI	18	12	4	2	55	21	+34	28	Promotion Playoffs – Promoted
2	Högaborgs BK, Hälsingborg	18	9	7	2	30	25	+5	25	
3	Eskilsminne IF, Hälsingborg	18	11	2	5	49	23	+26	24	
4	BK Drott, Hälsingborg	18	9	4	5	40	32	+8	22	
5	IFK Trelleborg	18	8	4	6	30	25	+5	20	
6	Kävlinge GIF	18	6	6	6	28	27	+1	18	
7	Klippans BoIF	18	6	4	8	35	48	−13	16	
8	IFK Kristianstad	18	2	7	9	25	38	−13	11	
9	BK Landora, Landskrona	18	3	3	12	27	57	−30	9	Relegated
10	IFK Höganäs	18	1	5	12	25	48	−23	7	Relegated
