= 1939–40 Division 3 (Swedish football) =

Swedish League Division 3
- Season: 1939–40
- Champions: Iggesunds IK; Hofors AIF; Sundbybergs IK; Örebro SK; IF Rune; Arvika BK; Waggeryds IK; Kalmar AIK; Kinna IF; Lundby IF; IFK Kristianstad
- Promoted: 8 teams
- Relegated: 9 teams

Statistics of Swedish football Division 3 for the 1939–40 season.

== League standings ==
=== Uppsvenska Östra 1939–40 ===
| Pos | Team | Pld | W | D | L | GF | GA | GD | Pts | Qualification or relegation |
|---|---|---|---|---|---|---|---|---|---|---|
| 1 | Iggesunds IK | 18 | 15 | 3 | 0 | 57 | 10 | +47 | 33 | Promotion Playoffs |
| 2 | Strands IF, Hudiksvall | 18 | 10 | 3 | 5 | 35 | 21 | +14 | 23 | |
| 3 | Kramfors IF | 18 | 9 | 4 | 5 | 37 | 38 | −1 | 22 | |
| 4 | Essviks AIF | 18 | 9 | 2 | 7 | 32 | 35 | −3 | 20 | |
| 5 | Bollnäs GIF | 18 | 6 | 5 | 7 | 27 | 27 | 0 | 17 | |
| 6 | Ala IF | 18 | 4 | 7 | 7 | 32 | 37 | −5 | 15 | |
| 7 | Alfta GIF | 18 | 6 | 2 | 10 | 31 | 46 | −15 | 14 | |
| 8 | Skärgårdens IF, Sandarne | 18 | 5 | 3 | 10 | 34 | 43 | −9 | 13 | |
| 9 | GIF Sundsvall | 18 | 5 | 2 | 11 | 33 | 45 | −12 | 12 | Relegated |
| 10 | Söderhamns IF | 18 | 4 | 3 | 11 | 23 | 39 | −16 | 11 | Relegated |

=== Uppsvenska Västra 1939–40 ===
| Pos | Team | Pld | W | D | L | GF | GA | GD | Pts | Promotion or relegation |
|---|---|---|---|---|---|---|---|---|---|---|
| 1 | Hofors AIF | 18 | 12 | 1 | 5 | 56 | 23 | +33 | 25 | Promotion Playoffs – Promoted |
| 2 | Örtakoloniens IF, Sandviken | 18 | 10 | 4 | 4 | 48 | 27 | +21 | 24 | |
| 3 | IFK Grängesberg | 18 | 10 | 3 | 5 | 63 | 42 | +21 | 23 | |
| 4 | Skutskärs IF | 18 | 9 | 4 | 5 | 37 | 36 | +1 | 22 | |
| 5 | Brynäs IF, Gävle | 18 | 9 | 2 | 7 | 39 | 32 | +7 | 20 | |
| 6 | Avesta AIK | 18 | 9 | 0 | 9 | 37 | 41 | −4 | 18 | |
| 7 | IFK Mora | 18 | 7 | 3 | 8 | 43 | 47 | −4 | 17 | |
| 8 | Forsbacka IK | 18 | 7 | 2 | 9 | 49 | 47 | +2 | 16 | |
| 9 | Älvkarleby IK | 18 | 3 | 2 | 13 | 28 | 75 | −47 | 8 | |
| 10 | Högbo AIK | 18 | 3 | 1 | 14 | 26 | 56 | −30 | 7 | |

=== Östsvenska 1939–40 ===
| Pos | Team | Pld | W | D | L | GF | GA | GD | Pts | Promotion or relegation |
|---|---|---|---|---|---|---|---|---|---|---|
| 1 | Sundbybergs IK | 18 | 13 | 5 | 0 | 59 | 19 | +40 | 31 | Promoted |
| 2 | Enskede IK | 18 | 13 | 3 | 2 | 64 | 20 | +44 | 29 | |
| 3 | Årsta SK, Stockholm | 18 | 12 | 1 | 5 | 62 | 30 | +32 | 25 | |
| 4 | IFK Lidingö | 18 | 7 | 6 | 5 | 38 | 24 | +14 | 20 | |
| 5 | IF Vesta, Uppsala | 18 | 9 | 1 | 8 | 42 | 33 | +9 | 19 | |
| 6 | IF Olympia, Stockholm | 18 | 8 | 3 | 7 | 34 | 43 | −9 | 19 | |
| 7 | IK Sture, Stockholm | 18 | 4 | 5 | 9 | 32 | 51 | −19 | 13 | |
| 8 | Enebybergs IF | 18 | 5 | 2 | 11 | 33 | 60 | −27 | 12 | |
| 9 | IK Sirius, Uppsala | 18 | 2 | 3 | 13 | 25 | 64 | −39 | 7 | Relegated |
| 10 | Lunda SK, Märsta | 18 | 2 | 1 | 15 | 23 | 68 | −45 | 5 | Relegated |

=== Centralserien Norra 1939–40 ===
| Pos | Team | Pld | W | D | L | GF | GA | GD | Pts | Promotion or relegation |
|---|---|---|---|---|---|---|---|---|---|---|
| 1 | Örebro SK | 18 | 14 | 4 | 0 | 93 | 13 | +80 | 32 | Promotion Playoffs – Promoted |
| 2 | Örebro IK | 18 | 14 | 1 | 3 | 67 | 26 | +41 | 29 | |
| 3 | Kolsva IF | 18 | 10 | 5 | 3 | 53 | 20 | +33 | 25 | |
| 4 | Ramnäs IF | 18 | 9 | 5 | 4 | 61 | 43 | +18 | 23 | |
| 5 | Fagersta AIK | 18 | 9 | 4 | 5 | 48 | 20 | +28 | 22 | |
| 6 | IFK Lindesberg | 18 | 7 | 0 | 11 | 41 | 64 | −23 | 14 | |
| 7 | IFK Örebro | 18 | 5 | 3 | 10 | 25 | 67 | −42 | 13 | |
| 8 | Hällefors AIF | 18 | 5 | 1 | 12 | 35 | 64 | −29 | 11 | |
| 9 | IK Svenske, Örebro | 18 | 3 | 0 | 15 | 23 | 74 | −51 | 6 | |
| 10 | Laxå IF | 18 | 1 | 3 | 14 | 20 | 75 | −55 | 5 | Relegated |

=== Centralserien Södra 1939–40 ===
| Pos | Team | Pld | W | D | L | GF | GA | GD | Pts | Qualification or relegation |
|---|---|---|---|---|---|---|---|---|---|---|
| 1 | IF Rune, Kungsör | 18 | 12 | 4 | 2 | 47 | 22 | +25 | 28 | Promotion Playoffs |
| 2 | Västerås SK | 18 | 12 | 3 | 3 | 43 | 17 | +26 | 27 | |
| 3 | IK City, Eskilstuna | 18 | 10 | 4 | 4 | 47 | 22 | +25 | 24 | |
| 4 | Katrineholms SK | 18 | 8 | 3 | 7 | 36 | 42 | −6 | 19 | |
| 5 | Nyköpings AIK | 18 | 8 | 2 | 8 | 45 | 38 | +7 | 18 | |
| 6 | Västerås IK | 18 | 7 | 4 | 7 | 29 | 27 | +2 | 18 | |
| 7 | IF Verdandi, Eskilstuna | 18 | 7 | 2 | 9 | 34 | 31 | +3 | 16 | |
| 8 | Katrineholms AIK | 18 | 4 | 5 | 9 | 21 | 52 | −31 | 13 | |
| 9 | Nyköpings SK | 18 | 4 | 3 | 11 | 35 | 52 | −17 | 11 | |
| 10 | Högsjö BK | 18 | 2 | 2 | 14 | 23 | 57 | −34 | 6 | Relegated |

=== Nordvästra 1939–40 ===
| Pos | Team | Pld | W | D | L | GF | GA | GD | Pts | Promotion or relegation |
|---|---|---|---|---|---|---|---|---|---|---|
| 1 | Arvika BK | 18 | 10 | 5 | 3 | 51 | 25 | +26 | 25 | Promoted |
| 2 | Forshaga IF | 18 | 10 | 2 | 6 | 52 | 38 | +14 | 22 | |
| 3 | IFK Bofors | 18 | 9 | 3 | 6 | 34 | 22 | +12 | 21 | |
| 4 | Karlstads BIK | 18 | 8 | 4 | 6 | 45 | 32 | +13 | 20 | |
| 5 | IFK Åmål | 18 | 8 | 4 | 6 | 35 | 30 | +5 | 20 | |
| 6 | Mustadfors IF | 18 | 7 | 4 | 7 | 34 | 49 | −15 | 18 | |
| 7 | IFK Kristinehamn | 18 | 6 | 4 | 8 | 29 | 37 | −8 | 16 | |
| 8 | IFK Sunne | 18 | 6 | 3 | 9 | 34 | 41 | −7 | 15 | |
| 9 | Nykroppa AIK | 18 | 4 | 4 | 10 | 26 | 41 | −15 | 12 | |
| 10 | Fengersfors IK | 18 | 4 | 1 | 13 | 31 | 56 | −25 | 9 | Relegated |

=== Mellansvenska 1939–40 ===
| Pos | Team | Pld | W | D | L | GF | GA | GD | Pts | Promotion or relegation |
|---|---|---|---|---|---|---|---|---|---|---|
| 1 | Waggeryds IK | 18 | 13 | 3 | 2 | 63 | 29 | +34 | 29 | |
| 2 | Åtvidabergs FF | 18 | 14 | 1 | 3 | 65 | 33 | +32 | 29 | Promoted |
| 3 | Motala AIF | 18 | 10 | 3 | 5 | 55 | 38 | +17 | 23 | |
| 4 | BK Derby, Linköping | 18 | 7 | 4 | 7 | 48 | 44 | +4 | 18 | |
| 5 | Tranås AIF | 18 | 6 | 5 | 7 | 39 | 41 | −2 | 17 | |
| 6 | Karle IF | 18 | 6 | 5 | 7 | 40 | 48 | −8 | 17 | |
| 7 | Vetlanda FF | 18 | 7 | 1 | 10 | 36 | 53 | −17 | 15 | |
| 8 | IFK Oskarshamn | 18 | 5 | 3 | 10 | 44 | 58 | −14 | 13 | |
| 9 | Norrahammars GIS | 18 | 2 | 6 | 10 | 42 | 55 | −13 | 10 | |
| 10 | Loddby IF | 18 | 3 | 3 | 12 | 24 | 57 | −33 | 9 | Relegated |

=== Sydöstra 1939–40 ===
| Pos | Team | Pld | W | D | L | GF | GA | GD | Pts | Promotion or relegation |
|---|---|---|---|---|---|---|---|---|---|---|
| 1 | Kalmar AIK | 18 | 12 | 3 | 3 | 75 | 29 | +46 | 27 | Promoted |
| 2 | Växjö BK | 18 | 10 | 1 | 7 | 55 | 32 | +23 | 21 | |
| 3 | Kalmar FF | 18 | 9 | 1 | 8 | 26 | 32 | −6 | 19 | |
| 4 | Lessebo GIF | 18 | 8 | 2 | 8 | 34 | 42 | −8 | 18 | |
| 5 | Högadals IS | 18 | 6 | 5 | 7 | 43 | 43 | 0 | 17 | |
| 6 | Nybro IF | 18 | 7 | 3 | 8 | 35 | 42 | −7 | 17 | |
| 7 | Kallinge SK | 18 | 8 | 1 | 9 | 39 | 47 | −8 | 17 | |
| 8 | IFK Karlshamn | 18 | 5 | 5 | 8 | 37 | 44 | −7 | 15 | |
| 9 | Anderstorps IF | 18 | 7 | 1 | 10 | 52 | 64 | −12 | 15 | |
| 10 | Hovmantorps GIF | 18 | 5 | 4 | 9 | 26 | 47 | −21 | 14 | |

=== Västsvenska Norra 1939–40 ===
| Pos | Team | Pld | W | D | L | GF | GA | GD | Pts | Qualification |
|---|---|---|---|---|---|---|---|---|---|---|
| 1 | Kinna IF | 18 | 11 | 3 | 4 | 39 | 24 | +15 | 25 | Promotion Playoffs |
| 2 | Trollhättans IF | 18 | 10 | 4 | 4 | 38 | 25 | +13 | 24 | |
| 3 | IFK Trollhättan | 18 | 10 | 2 | 6 | 32 | 17 | +15 | 22 | |
| 4 | Vänersborgs IF | 18 | 8 | 2 | 8 | 26 | 21 | +5 | 18 | |
| 5 | Kungshamns IF | 18 | 8 | 2 | 8 | 36 | 33 | +3 | 18 | |
| 6 | IFK Uddevalla | 18 | 8 | 2 | 8 | 28 | 33 | −5 | 18 | |
| 7 | IFK Tidaholm | 18 | 8 | 1 | 9 | 23 | 31 | −8 | 17 | |
| 8 | Alingsås IF | 18 | 8 | 0 | 10 | 28 | 27 | +1 | 16 | |
| 9 | Munkedals IF | 18 | 6 | 3 | 9 | 20 | 31 | −11 | 15 | |
| 10 | IK Kongahälla, Kungälv | 18 | 1 | 5 | 12 | 18 | 46 | −28 | 7 | |

=== Västsvenska Södra 1939–40 ===
| Pos | Team | Pld | W | D | L | GF | GA | GD | Pts | Promotion |
|---|---|---|---|---|---|---|---|---|---|---|
| 1 | Lundby IF, Göteborg | 18 | 13 | 5 | 0 | 73 | 26 | +47 | 31 | Promotion Playoffs – Promoted |
| 2 | Skogens IF, Göteborg | 18 | 11 | 5 | 2 | 69 | 30 | +39 | 27 | |
| 3 | Falkenbergs FF | 18 | 9 | 4 | 5 | 62 | 33 | +29 | 22 | |
| 4 | IK Virgo, Göteborg | 18 | 9 | 3 | 6 | 46 | 32 | +14 | 21 | |
| 5 | Krokslätts FF, Mölndal | 18 | 9 | 1 | 8 | 57 | 47 | +10 | 19 | |
| 6 | Oskarströms IS | 18 | 7 | 3 | 8 | 38 | 45 | −7 | 17 | |
| 7 | Majornas IK, Göteborg | 18 | 7 | 2 | 9 | 38 | 40 | −2 | 16 | |
| 8 | Hisingstads IS, Hisingen | 18 | 6 | 3 | 9 | 40 | 53 | −13 | 15 | |
| 9 | Varbergs GIF | 18 | 3 | 3 | 12 | 38 | 93 | −55 | 9 | |
| 10 | Fässbergs IF, Mölndal | 18 | 0 | 3 | 15 | 13 | 75 | −62 | 3 | |

=== Sydsvenska 1939–40 ===
| Pos | Team | Pld | W | D | L | GF | GA | GD | Pts | Promotion or relegation |
|---|---|---|---|---|---|---|---|---|---|---|
| 1 | IFK Kristianstad | 18 | 13 | 4 | 1 | 49 | 26 | +23 | 30 | Promoted |
| 2 | IFK Hässleholm | 18 | 12 | 2 | 4 | 51 | 28 | +23 | 26 | |
| 3 | IFK Höganäs | 18 | 11 | 2 | 5 | 49 | 26 | +23 | 24 | |
| 4 | Klippans BoIF | 18 | 10 | 3 | 5 | 46 | 27 | +19 | 23 | |
| 5 | Limhamns IF | 18 | 8 | 1 | 9 | 42 | 40 | +2 | 17 | |
| 6 | Alets IK | 18 | 5 | 3 | 10 | 43 | 42 | +1 | 13 | |
| 7 | Stattena IF, Hälsingborg | 18 | 5 | 3 | 10 | 27 | 49 | −22 | 13 | |
| 8 | Bjuvs IF | 18 | 5 | 3 | 10 | 25 | 55 | −30 | 13 | |
| 9 | IFK Hälsingborg | 18 | 5 | 2 | 11 | 38 | 43 | −5 | 12 | |
| 10 | Tomelilla IF | 18 | 3 | 3 | 12 | 25 | 59 | −34 | 9 | Relegated |
