= Åhlund =

Åhlund is a Swedish surname. Notable people with the surname include:

- Joakim Åhlund (born 1970), Swedish musician and record producer
- Klas Åhlund (born 1972), Swedish songwriter, record producer, and guitarist
- Olle Åhlund (1920–1996), Swedish footballer and manager
