= Yrjö Sotiola =

Finnish footballer (1913-1992)

Personal information
- Date of birth: 19 May 1913
- Place of birth: Helsinki, Finland
- Date of death: 1 June 1992 (aged 79)
- Place of death: Helsinki, Finland
- Position: Inside forward

Senior career*
Years	Team	Apps	(Gls)
1933-1952	Helsingin Palloseura	?	(94)

International career
1935–1948	Finland	11	(1)
- * Club domestic league appearances and goals

Yrjö Sotiola (19 May 1913 – 1 June 1992) was a Finnish footballer. He played in eleven matches for the Finland national football team from 1935 to 1948. He was also part of Finland's squad for the football tournament at the 1936 Summer Olympics, but he did not play in any matches. He played his whole club career for Helsingin Palloseura in first and second tiers of Finnish football pyramid. In premier league he played 179 games and scored 60 goals. He won Finnish football championship in 1934 and 1935 seasons.
