= Jørn Jegsen =

Danish footballer (1920-1976)

Personal information
- Date of birth: 20 December 1920
- Date of death: 30 March 1976 (aged 55)

International career
Years	Team	Apps	(Gls)
1943–1945	Denmark	2	(0)

Jørn Jegsen (20 December 1920 – 30 March 1976) was a Danish footballer. He played in two matches for the Denmark national football team from 1943 to 1945.
