= Kjell Rosén =

Swedish footballer

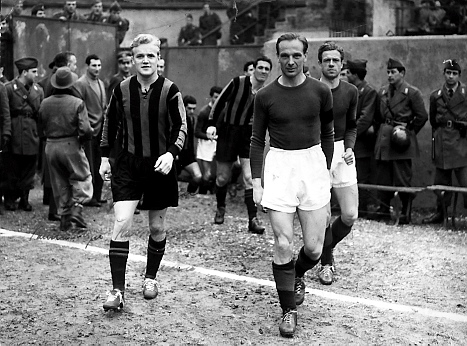
- Kjell Rosén (right) while playing for Torino with Nacka Skoglund of Inter (left)

Personal information
- Full name: Kjell Rosén
- Date of birth: 24 April 1921
- Place of birth: Malmö, Sweden
- Date of death: 13 June 1999 (aged 78)
- Place of death: Bunkeflostrand, Sweden
- Position: Defender

Youth career
- Malmö BI

Senior career*
Years	Team	Apps	(Gls)
1939–1950	Malmö FF	204	(41)
1950–1951	Torino	35	(2)
1951–1953	Novara	45	(2)
1953–1954	Angers	0	(0)
1954–1957	Malmö FF	0	(0)
Total		284	(45)

International career
1943–1949	Sweden	22	(6)

Managerial career
- 1956–1957: Höganäs BK
- 1958: IF Allians
Medal record
Representing Sweden
Olympic Games
Gold medal – first place	1948 London	Team competition
- * Club domestic league appearances and goals

Kjell Rosén (24 April 1921 – 13 June 1999) was a Swedish footballer who played the majority of his career at Malmö FF as a defender. He also played professionally in Italy and in France. After his career as a player Rosén became a coach and coached lower league teams until he returned to Malmö FF as a youth coach.

He won a gold medal in 1948 Summer Olympic Games.
