= Börje Leander =

Swedish footballer

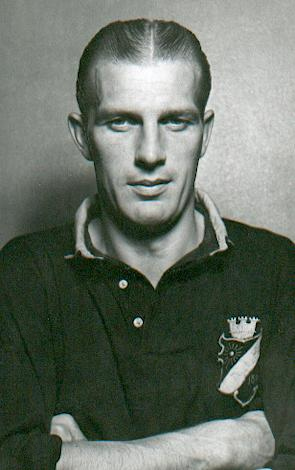

Personal information
- Full name: Oscar Börje Leander
- Date of birth: 7 March 1918
- Place of birth: Avesta, Sweden
- Date of death: 30 October 2003 (aged 85)
- Place of death: Mora, Sweden
- Position: Midfielder

Senior career*
Years	Team	Apps	(Gls)
1938–1953	AIK	249	(25)

International career
1941–1950	Sweden	23	(4)
Medal record
Men's football
Representing Sweden
Olympic Games
Gold medal – first place	1948 London	Team competition
- * Club domestic league appearances and goals

Oscar Börje Leander (7 March 1918 – 30 October 2003) was a Swedish footballer. He played 249 matches as a midfielder for AIK and scored 25 goals, mostly successful penalty kicks. He also played 23 times for the Sweden national team, scoring four goals. He was on the Sweden squad that won the gold medal in the 1948 Summer Olympics. When Knut Nordahl was injured in the opening match against Austria, Leander stepped in as a substitute right-back, and stayed until the final, when Nordahl recovered.

== Honours ==
Sweden

- Summer Olympics: 1948
