= Torsten Lindberg =

Swedish footballer and manager

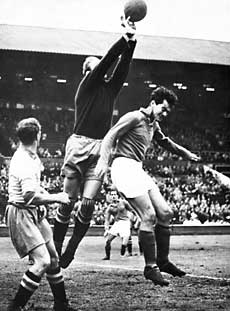
- Lindberg competing at the 1948 Summer Olympics in London

Personal information
- Full name: Torsten Gustav Adolf Lindberg
- Date of birth: 14 April 1917
- Place of birth: Nässjö, Sweden
- Date of death: 31 August 2009 (aged 92)
- Place of death: Malmö, Sweden
- Position: Goalkeeper

Senior career*
Years	Team	Apps	(Gls)
–1937	Husqvarna IF		
1937–????	IK Tord		
–1940	Örgryte IS		
1940–1953	IFK Norrköping		

International career
1947–1951	Sweden	19	(0)

Managerial career
- 1953–1954: IFK Norrköping
- 1958: Sweden (Assistant)
- 1964–1966: Djurgårdens IF
- 1969–1970: AIK
- * Club domestic league appearances and goals

Torsten Gustav Adolf Lindberg (14 April 1917 – 31 August 2009) was a Swedish football player and manager. As a player, he won a gold medal at the 1948 Summer Olympics and a bronze medal at the 1950 FIFA World Cup; as a manager he won two league titles with Djurgårdens IF in 1964 and 1966.

Lindberg played club football with Husqvarna IF, IK Tord, Örgryte IS and IFK Norrköping. As a manager, he coached IFK Norrköping, Djurgårdens IF and AIK; he was also Assistant Coach of the Swedish national side during the 1958 FIFA World Cup.
