= Gustav Sjöberg =

Swedish footballer

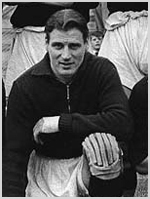
- Gustav Sjöberg ca. 1935.

Personal information
- Full name: Ivar Gustaf Albert Sjöberg
- Date of birth: 23 March 1913
- Place of birth: Sweden
- Date of death: 3 October 2003 (aged 90)
- Position: Goalkeeper

Senior career*
Years	Team	Apps	(Gls)
1932–1950	AIK Fotboll	321	

International career
- Sweden
- * Club domestic league appearances and goals

Ivar Gustaf Albert Sjöberg, best known as Gustav Sjöberg (23 March 1913 – 3 October 2003), was a Swedish football goalkeeper who played for AIK. He also represented Team Sweden in the 1938 FIFA World Cup in France. He was also part of Sweden's squad at the 1936 Summer Olympics, but he did not play in any matches.
