= Arne Nyberg =

Swedish footballer

Personal information
- Full name: Arne Gustav Julius Nyberg
- Date of birth: June 20, 1913
- Place of birth: Säffle, Sweden
- Date of death: August 12, 1970 (aged 57)
- Place of death: Stockholm, Sweden
- Position: Forward

Senior career*
Years	Team	Apps	(Gls)
1930–1932	SK Sifhälla	65	(23)
1932–1950	IFK Göteborg	432	(148)
Total		497	(171)

International career
1935–1946	Sweden	31	(18)
- * Club domestic league appearances and goals

Arne Gustav Julius Nyberg (20 June 1913 – 12 August 1970) was a Swedish football striker born in Säffle.

== Career ==
After starting his career playing for SK Sifhälla, he joined IFK Göteborg in 1932 and won two Swedish Championships with the club. He played for IFK for the rest of his career making him a one-club man and also worked for the club after retiring as an active player.

== Personal life ==
Nyberg died in 1970, aged 57. His son, Ralf Nyberg, also played for IFK Göteborg and won a Swedish Championship medal.

== Honours ==
IFK Göteborg

- Allsvenskan: 1934–35, 1941–42
