= Karle IF =

Swedish football club

- Full name: Karle Idrottsförening
- Founded: 1927; 99 years ago
- Ground: Ryd, Linköping
- Chairman: Zoraiz Zafar
- Head coach: Nicke Norgren
- League: Division 4 Östergötland Västra
Home colours	Away colours

Karle IF is a Swedish football club located in Linköping.

== Background ==
Karle IF currently plays in Division 4 Östergötland Västra which is the sixth tier of Swedish football. They play their home matches at the Karlbergsplan in Linköping.

Karle IF are affiliated to Östergötlands Fotbollförbund.

karle are good at futbul

== Season to season ==
In their most successful period Karle IF competed in the following divisions:

Season	Level	Division	Section	Position	Movements
1938–39	Tier 3	Division 3	Mellansvenska	8th	
1939–40	Tier 3	Division 3	Mellansvenska Norra	6th	
1940–41	Tier 3	Division 3	Mellansvenska Norra	7th	
1941–42	Tier 3	Division 3	Mellansvenska Norra	6th	
1942–43	Tier 3	Division 3	Mellansvenska Norra	7th	
1943–44	Tier 3	Division 3	Mellansvenska Norra	2nd	
1944–45	Tier 3	Division 3	Mellansvenska Norra	7th	
1945–46	Tier 3	Division 3	Mellansvenska Norra	3rd	
1946–47	Tier 3	Division 3	Mellansvenska Norra	6th	Relegated

In recent seasons Karle IF have competed in the following divisions:

Season	Level	Division	Section	Position	Movements
2006*	Tier 7	Division 5	Östergötland Västra	3rd	
2007	Tier 7	Division 5	Östergötland Västra	2nd	Promoted
2008	Tier 6	Division 4	Östergötland Västra	10th	
2009	Tier 6	Division 4	Östergötland Västra	6th	
2010	Tier 6	Division 4	Östergötland Västra	4th	
2011	Tier 6	Division 4	Östergötland Västra		

* League restructuring in 2006 resulted in a new division being created at Tier 3 and subsequent divisions dropping a level.
