= Stig Nyström =

Swedish footballer

Personal information
- Date of birth: 25 November 1919
- Place of birth: Stora Tuna, Sweden
- Date of death: 31 July 1983 (aged 63)
- Place of death: Borlänge, Sweden
- Position: Forward

Senior career*
Years	Team	Apps	(Gls)
- IK Brage
- Djurgårdens IF

International career
1939–1947	Sweden	11	(5)
- * Club domestic league appearances and goals

Stig Robert Nyström (25 November 1919 – 31 July 1983) was a Swedish international footballer. He played for IK Brage and Djurgårdens IF as well as the Sweden national team.

== Career ==
Nyström was born in Stora Tuna. He played his club football for IK Brage and Djurgårdens IF in Allsvenskan. For Brage, he became the 1940–41 Allsvenskan top scorer.

Nyström was part of Sweden's squad for the football tournament at the 1948 Summer Olympics, but he did not play in any matches. In total, he made 11 appearances and scored five goals for the Sweden national team.

Stig Nyström died in Borlänge on 31 July 1983.
