= Forsbacka IK =

Sports club in Forsbacka, Sweden

- Full name: Forsbacka Idrottsklubb
- Nicknames: Yellow Peril
- Sport: Bandy, floorball, handball, soccer
- Founded: 1918
- Based in: Forsbacka, Sweden
- Stadium: Mariehov

Forsbacka IK is a sports club in Forsbacka, Sweden, established in 1918. The club plays bandy, floorball, handball and soccer. The men's bandy team, popular known as the "Yellow Peril" (Swedish: Gula faran), has played 16 seasons in the Swedish top division. between 1940 and 1967–1968. Being described as a typical "yo-yo" club, the men's bandy team was often being promoted and relegated between the top division and second division for almost 30 years.

The men's soccer team has played nine seasons in the Swedish third division.

The floorball section was started in 1991.
