= Malte Mårtensson =

Swedish footballer (1916–1973)

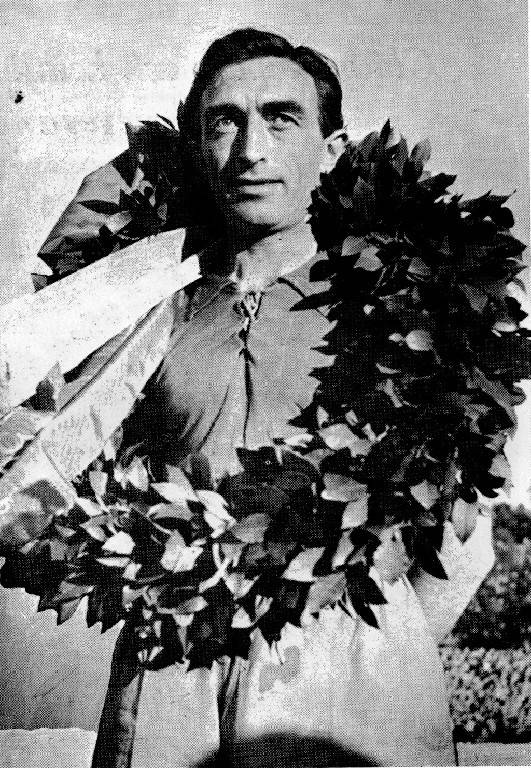

Personal information
- Full name: Malte Harald Mårtensson
- Date of birth: 24 September 1916
- Place of birth: Helsingborg, Sweden
- Date of death: 22 April 1973 (aged 56)
- Position: Midfielder

International career
Years	Team	Apps	(Gls)
1937–1949	Sweden	16	(3)

Malte Harald Mårtensson (24 September 1916 – 22 April 1973) was a Swedish footballer who played as a midfielder. He made 16 appearances for the Sweden national team from 1937 to 1949. He was also named in Sweden's squad for the Group 1 qualification tournament for the 1938 FIFA World Cup.
