= Börje Tapper =

Swedish footballer and manager

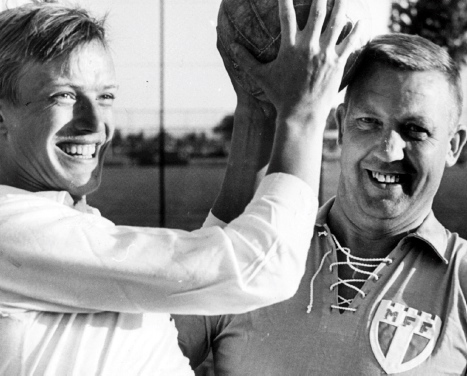

Personal information
- Full name: Börje Karl-Anders Tapper
- Date of birth: 19 May 1922
- Place of birth: Malmö, Sweden
- Date of death: 8 April 1981 (aged 58)
- Place of death: Malmö, Sweden
- Position: Centre midfielder

Youth career
- –1939: Håkanstorp

Senior career*
Years	Team	Apps	(Gls)
1939–1950	Malmö FF	191	(92)
1950	Genoa	7	(2)
Total		198	(94)

International career
1945–1948	Sweden	4	(7)

Managerial career
- 1956–1957: Lunds BK
Medal record
Representing Sweden
FIFA World Cup
Third place	1950 Brazil
- * Club domestic league appearances and goals

Börje Karl-Anders Tapper (19 May 1922 – 8 April 1981) was a Swedish footballer who played as a midfielder for Malmö FF, Genoa, and the Sweden national team. He won four caps for Sweden and was a squad member at the 1950 FIFA World Cup.

== Career ==
Tapper started his playing career at Håkanstorp before moving on to Malmö FF. He played for the club between 1939 and 1950, when he went to Italy and Genoa. He did not succeed in Italy and when he came home to Sweden, he was not allowed to play in Allsvenskan anymore due to the policy at the time. He is Malmö FF's second best goalscorer ever with 298 goals.

He later coached Lunds BK.

== Personal life ==
He is the father of Staffan Tapper.

== Career statistics ==
=== International ===
Appearances and goals by national team and year
National team	Year	Apps	Goals
Sweden	1945	1	5
Sweden	1946	1	0
Sweden	1947	1	1
Sweden	1948	1	1
Total		4	7

Scores and results list Sweden's goal tally first, score column indicates score after each Tapper goal.

List of international goals scored by Börje Tapper
No.	Date	Venue	Opponent	Score	Result	Competition	Ref.
1	30 September 1945	Olympic Stadium, Helsinki, Finland	Finland	1–1	6–1	Friendly	
2	30 September 1945	Olympic Stadium, Helsinki, Finland	Finland	3–1	6–1	Friendly	
3	30 September 1945	Olympic Stadium, Helsinki, Finland	Finland	4–1	6–1	Friendly	
4	30 September 1945	Olympic Stadium, Helsinki, Finland	Finland	5–1	6–1	Friendly	
5	30 September 1945	Olympic Stadium, Helsinki, Finland	Finland	6–1	6–1	Friendly	
6	14 September 1947	Råsunda Stadium, Solna, Sweden	Poland	3–2	5–4	Friendly	
7	19 September 1948	Olympic Stadium, Helsinki, Finland	Finland	1–0	2–2	1948–51 Nordic Football Championship	
