= Rune Emanuelsson =

Swedish footballer (1923–1993)

Olympic medal record

Representing Sweden

Men's Football
| Gold medal – first place | 1948 London | Team competition |

Rune Emanuelsson (8 October 1923 – 21 March 1993) was a Swedish football defender born in Gothenburg. He was nicknamed Killing (meaning kid, young goat). He was also part of Sweden's squad for the football tournament at the 1948 Summer Olympics, but he did not play in any matches. He won a total of 13 caps for the Sweden national team between 1945 and 1951.

He debuted for IFK Göteborg in 1942 and played for the club until 1955 when he retired. He died in 1993.

== Clubs ==
- IFK Göteborg (1942–55)
