= Bertil Nordahl =

Swedish footballer and manager

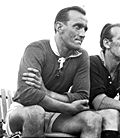
- Bertil Nordahl

Personal information
- Full name: Karl Bertil Emanuel Nordahl
- Date of birth: 26 July 1917
- Place of birth: Hörnefors, Sweden
- Date of death: 1 December 1998 (aged 81)
- Place of death: Degerfors, Sweden
- Position: Midfielder

Senior career*
Years	Team	Apps	(Gls)
1936–1942	Hörnefors IF	?	(?)
1942–1949	Degerfors IF	126	(1)
1949–1951	Atalanta B.C.	76	(0)
1951–1952	Degerfors IF	0	(0)
Total		202+	(1+)

International career
1945–1948	Sweden	15	(0)

Managerial career
- 1952–1953: Örebro SK
- 1953–1955: IK Brage
Medal record
Representing Sweden
Men's Football
Gold medal – first place	1948 London	Team competition
- * Club domestic league appearances and goals

Karl Bertil Emanuel Nordahl (26 July 1917 – 1 December 1998) was a Swedish footballer who played as a midfielder. He was also a football manager.

== Playing career ==
He played for Hörnefors IF, Degerfors IF and Atalanta B.C. between 1936 and 1952.

He won the gold medal at the 1948 Summer Olympics, along with his brothers Knut and Gunnar Nordahl. After the Olympics, he and Gunnar transferred to Italy and, due to being in a professional football league while the Swedish football was all amateur, they were not called to the 1950 FIFA World Cup. He was capped 15 times for the Sweden men's national football team.

== Managerial career ==
After his playing career, he coached Örebro SK and IK Brage.
