= Harry Nilsson (footballer) =

Swedish footballer (1916–1993)

Personal information
- Full name: Harry Walfrid Nilsson
- Date of birth: January 5, 1916
- Place of birth: Sweden
- Date of death: February 2, 1993 (aged 77)
- Height: 1.77 m (5 ft 9 1/2 in)
- Position: Defender

Youth career
- Landskrona BoIS

Senior career*
| Years | Team | Apps | (Gls) |
| 1930–41 | Landskrona BoIS | 146 | (0) |
| 1942–50 | AIK | 167 | (0) |
| Total | | 313 | (0) |

International career
| 1938–47 | Sweden | 34 | (0) |
- * Club domestic league appearances and goals

Harry Walfrid Nilsson (January 5, 1916 – February 2, 1993) was a Swedish football defender who played for Sweden. He also played for Landskrona BoIS and AIK.
