= Knut Nordahl =

Swedish footballer

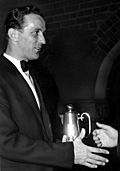
- Knut Nordahl in 1949

Personal information
- Full name: Knut Erik Alexander Nordahl
- Date of birth: 13 January 1920
- Place of birth: Hörnefors, Sweden
- Date of death: 28 October 1984 (aged 64)
- Place of death: Föllinge, Sweden
- Height: 1.86 m (6 ft 1 in)
- Position: Midfielder

Senior career*
Years	Team	Apps	(Gls)
1941–1950	IFK Norrköping		
1950–1952	A.S. Roma	61	(1)
1952–1953	Degerfors IF		

International career
1945–1950	Sweden	26	(1)
Medal record
Representing Sweden
Olympic Games
Gold medal – first place	1948 London
FIFA World Cup
Third place	1950 Brazil
- * Club domestic league appearances and goals

Knut Erik Alexander Nordahl (13 January 1920 – 28 October 1984) was a Swedish footballer who played as a midfielder.

== Career ==
Nordahl played for IFK Norrköping and A.S. Roma. He won the gold medal at the 1948 Summer Olympics along with his brothers Bertil and Gunnar Nordahl. The two went to Italy after the Olympics (Bertil to Atalanta B.C. and Gunnar to A.C. Milan) and, due to playing in a professional football league while Swedish football was all amateur, they were not called to the 1950 FIFA World Cup. Knut stayed in Sweden and was called to the tournament. After the World Cup, he was finally transferred to Italy, when he played for A.S. Roma. He was capped 26 times for the Sweden men's national football team between 1945 and 1950.
