= IF Viken =

Swedish football club

- Full name: Idrottsföreningen Viken
- Founded: 1922
- Ground: Rösvallen; Åmål; Sweden
- Chairman: Peder Dahlgren
- League: Division 4 Bohuslän/Dalsland
Home colours	Away colours

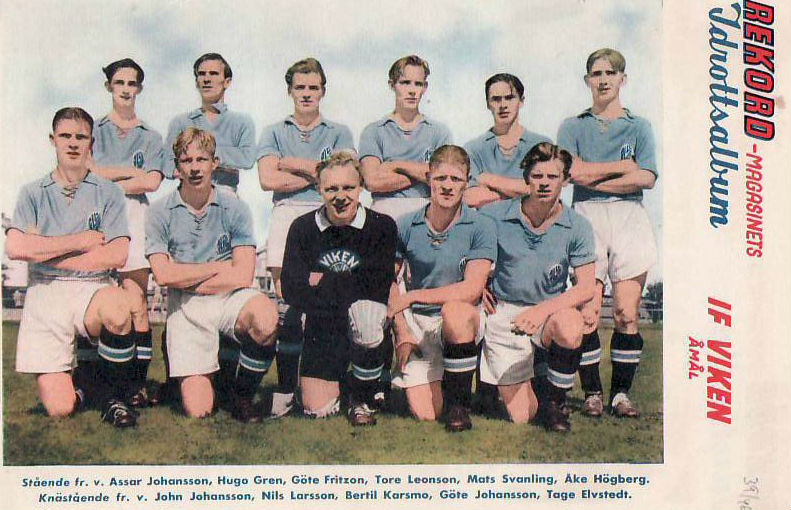
IF Viken during their first season in the 2nd Tier, 1946

IF Viken is a Swedish football club located in Åmål.

== Background ==
IF Viken currently plays in Division 3 Bohuslän/Dalsland which is the sixth tier of Swedish football. They play their home matches at the Rösvallen in Åmål.

The club played in the 1940s and 1950s in the second highest division (current Superettan). At best, they reached third place. The player uniform is a light blue shirt and white trousers, and sometimes navy blue collars and socks.

The club is affiliated to Dalslands Fotbollförbund. IF Viken have competed in the Svenska Cupen on 25 occasions and have played 52 matches in the competition.

== Season to season ==
In their most successful period IF Viken competed in the following divisions:

Season	Level	Division	Section	Position	Movements
1945–46	Tier 3	Division 3	Nordvästra Södra, Dalsland	1st	Promotion Playoffs – Promoted
1946–47	Tier 2	Division 2	Västra	9th	Relegated
1947–48	Tier 3	Division 3	Västra	3rd	
1948–49	Tier 3	Division 3	Västra	1st	Promoted
1949–50	Tier 2	Division 2	Nordöstra	5th	
1950–51	Tier 2	Division 2	Nordöstra	3rd	
1951–52	Tier 2	Division 2	Nordöstra	6th	
1952–53	Tier 2	Division 2	Nordöstra	10th	Relegated
1953–54	Tier 3	Division 3	Västra	3rd	

In recent seasons IF Viken have competed in the following divisions:

Season	Level	Division	Section	Position	Movements
2006*	Tier 6	Division 4	Bohuslän/Dalsland	2nd	Promotion Playoffs
2007	Tier 6	Division 4	Bohuslän/Dalsland	1st	Promoted
2008	Tier 5	Division 3	Nordvästra Götaland	9th	
2009	Tier 5	Division 3	Nordvästra Götaland	7th	
2010	Tier 5	Division 3	Nordvästra Götaland	11th	Relegated
2011	Tier 6	Division 4	Bohuslän/Dalsland	9th	

* League restructuring in 2006 resulted in a new division being created at Tier 3 and subsequent divisions dropping a level. |}
