= Alfta GIF =

Swedish sports club

Alfta GIF Handboll
- Full name: Alfta gymnastik- och idrottsförening Handboll
- Short name: Alfta GIF
- Founded: 10 November 1900
- Club colours
| Home | Away |

Alfta GIF is a sports club in Alfta, Sweden, established on 10 November 1900. The club runs handball, ice hockey and soccer, earlier even bandy. The men's bandy team played in the Swedish top division in 1941. The men's soccer team has played in the Swedish third division. The ice hockey section was established in 1947. The skiing and track and field athletics sections have been inactive since 2002.

== Kits ==
HOME
| 2010-11 | 2018-19 | 2019- |

AWAY
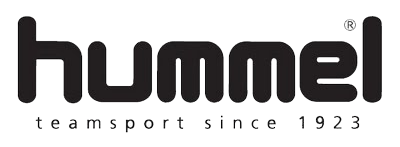
2019-
