= Stellan Nilsson =

Swedish footballer

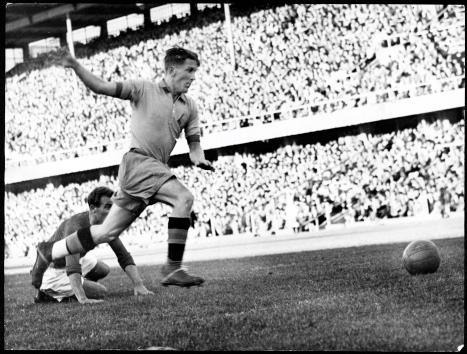
- Nilsson in 1947

Personal information
- Date of birth: 22 May 1922
- Place of birth: Lund, Sweden
- Date of death: 27 May 2003 (aged 81)
- Position: Midfielder

Senior career*
Years	Team	Apps	(Gls)
1942–1950	Malmö FF		
1950–1952	Genoa C.F.C.	50	(11)
1952–1954	Angers SCO	39	(4)
1954	Olympique de Marseille	2	(0)
1954–1955	Angers SCO		

International career
1943–1950	Sweden	17	(4)
Medal record
Representing Sweden
Olympic Games
Gold medal – first place	1948 London
FIFA World Cup
Third place	1950 Brazil
- * Club domestic league appearances and goals

Stellan Nilsson (22 May 1922 – 27 May 2003) was a Swedish football player. He played for the Sweden men's national football team at the 1950 FIFA World Cup. He was also part of Sweden's squad for the football tournament at the 1948 Summer Olympics, but he did not play in any matches.
