= BK Derby =

Swedish football club

- Full name: Bollklubben Derby
- Founded: 15 April 1912
- Ground: Karlbergsplan, Linköping
- League: Division 4 Östergötland Västra
- Division 4 Östergötland
- Website: https://www.derby.se/
Home colours	Away colours

BK Derby is a Swedish sports club located in Linköping, Sweden. It now only active in football club but was previously involved in bandy and other sports. The club was formed on 15 April 1912. The bandy department has formed a club of its own, Derby/Linköping BK, but the two clubs have an alliance and share the same logo and colours.

== Background ==
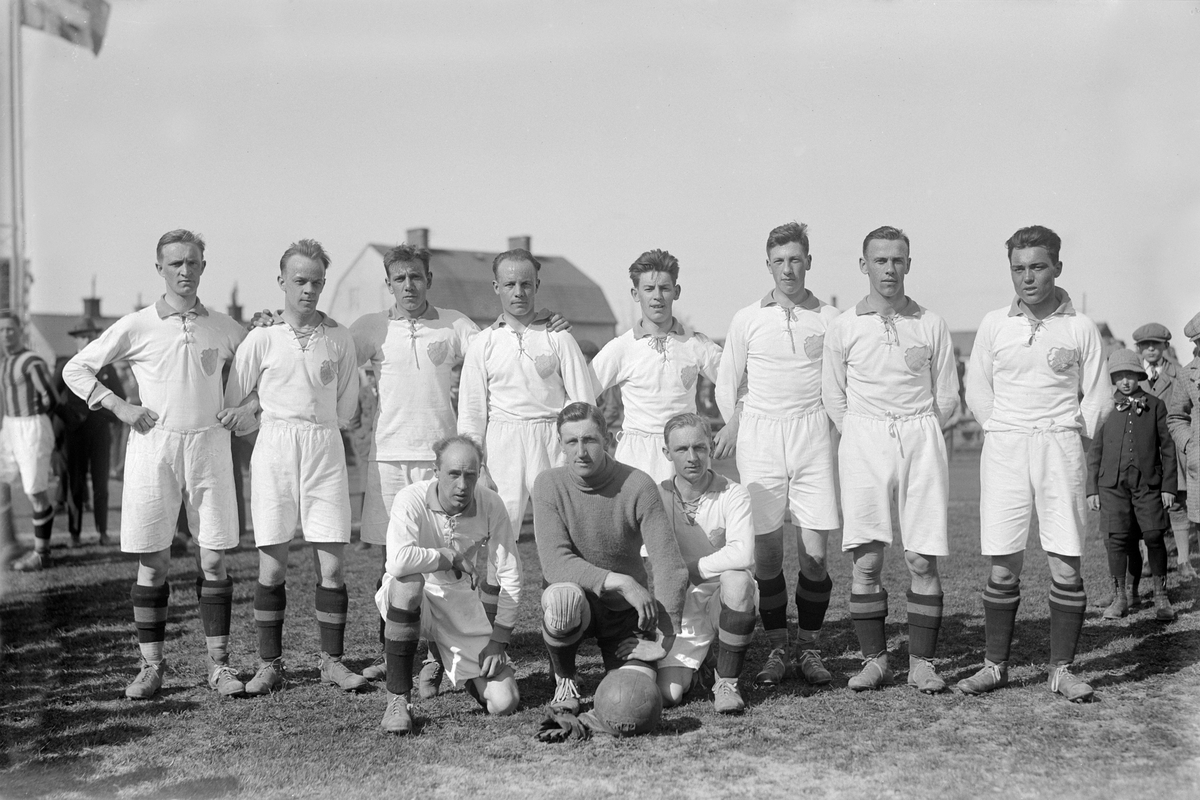
1928 BK Derby team photo.

The club has played one season in the highest Swedish league, Allsvenskan, in 1977. The club then merged with IF Saab and formed Linköpings FF in 1981. The club was recreated as BK Derby again in 1984 and in 2003 merged with BK Wolfram. The club then played two seasons under the name BK Derby/Wolfram, but soon changed back to the original name.

BK Derby currently plays in Division 4 Östergötland västra which is the sixth tier of Swedish football. They currently play their home matches at Karlbergsplan in Linköping.

The club is affiliated to the Östergötlands Fotbollförbund.

== Season to season ==
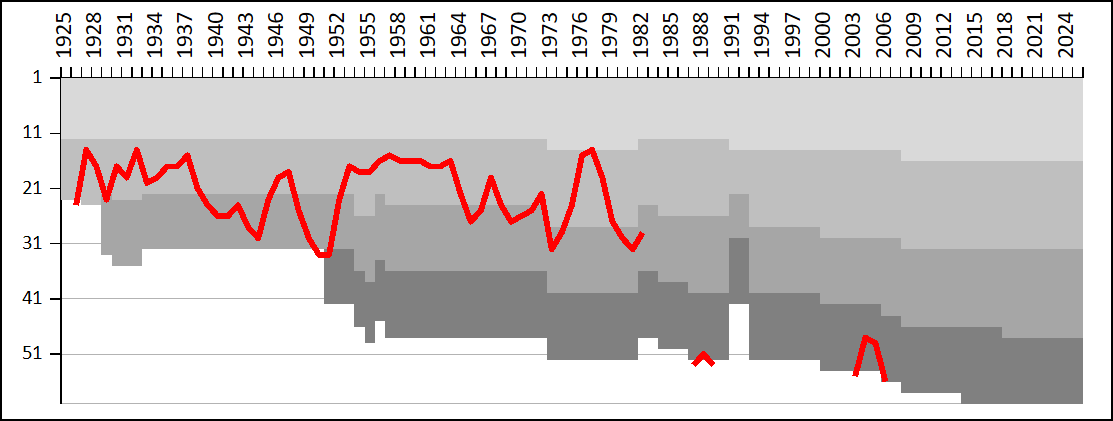
A chart showing the progress of BK Derby through the swedish football league system. The different shades of gray represent league divisions.

In their most successful period BK Derby competed in the following divisions:

Season	Level	Division	Section	Position	Movements
1951–52	Tier 3	Division 3	Östra	1st	Promoted
1952–53	Tier 2	Division 2	Nordöstra	5th	
1953–54	Tier 2	Division 2	Götaland	6th	
1954–55	Tier 2	Division 2	Götaland	6th	
1955–56	Tier 2	Division 2	Östra Götaland	4th	
1956–57	Tier 2	Division 2	Östra Götaland	3rd	
1957–58	Tier 2	Division 2	Östra Götaland	4th	
1959	Tier 2	Division 2	Östra Götaland	4th	
1960	Tier 2	Division 2	Östra Götaland	4th	
1961	Tier 2	Division 2	Östra Götaland	5th	
1962	Tier 2	Division 2	Östra Götaland	5th	
1963	Tier 2	Division 2	Östra Götaland	4th	
1964	Tier 2	Division 2	Östra Götaland	10th	Relegated
1965	Tier 3	Division 3	Nordöstra Götaland	3rd	
1966	Tier 3	Division 3	Nordöstra Götaland	1st	Promoted
1967	Tier 2	Division 2	Norra Götaland	7th	
1968	Tier 2	Division 2	Norra Götaland	12th	Relegated
1969	Tier 3	Division 3	Nordöstra Götaland	3rd	
1970	Tier 3	Division 3	Nordöstra Götaland	2nd	
1971	Tier 3	Division 3	Nordöstra Götaland	1st	Promotion Playoffs – Promoted
1972	Tier 2	Division 2	Mellersta	10th	Relegated
1973	Tier 3	Division 3	Nordöstra Götaland	4th	
1974	Tier 3	Division 3	Nordöstra Götaland	1st	Promoted
1975	Tier 2	Division 2	Norra	10th	
1976	Tier 2	Division 2	Norra	1st	Promoted
1977	Tier 1	Allsvenskan		14th	Relegated
1978	Tier 2	Division 2	Norra	5th	
1979	Tier 2	Division 2	Södra	13th	Relegated
1980	Tier 3	Division 3	Nordöstra Götaland	2nd	
1981	Tier 3	Division 3	Nordöstra Götaland	4th	
1982	Tier 3	Division 3	Nordöstra Götaland	1st	Derby/Saab FF – Promotion Playoffs

In recent seasons BK Derby have competed in the following divisions:

Season	Level	Division	Section	Position	Movements
1999	Tier 5	Division 4	Östergötland Västra	11th	Relegated
2000	Tier 6	Division 5	Östergötland Mellersta	8th	
2001	Tier 6	Division 5	Östergötland Mellersta	12th	Relegated
2002	Tier 7	Division 6	Östergötland Södra	1st	Promoted
2003	Tier 6	Division 5	Östergötland Mellersta	5th	Amalgamated with BK Wolfram
2004	Tier 4	Division 3	Västra Svealand	6th	BK Derby/Wolfram
2005	Tier 4	Division 3	Nordöstra Götaland	7th	BK Derby/Wolfram
2006*	Tier 5	Division 3	Nordöstra Götaland	10th	Relegated
2007	Tier 6	Division 4	Östergötland Östra	1st	Promoted
2008	Tier 5	Division 3	Nordöstra Götaland	12th	Relegated
2009	Tier 6	Division 4	Östergötland Västra	5th	
2010	Tier 6	Division 4	Östergötland Västra	10th	
2011	Tier 6	Division 4	Östergötland Västra	5th	
2012	Tier 6	Division 4	Östergötland Västra	1st	Promoted
2013	Tier 5	Division 3	Nordöstra Götaland	7th	
2014	Tier 5	Division 3	Nordöstra Götaland	7th	
2015	Tier 5	Division 3	Nordöstra Götaland	7th	
2016	Tier 5	Division 3	Nordöstra Götaland	9th	Relegation Playoffs – Relegated
2017	Tier 6	Division 4	Östergötland Västra	2nd	Promotion Playoffs – Not Promoted
2018	Tier 6	Division 4	Östergötland Östra	4th	
2019	Tier 6	Division 4	Östergötland Östra	3rd	
2020	Tier 6	Division 4	Östergötland Östra	11th	Relegated
2021	Tier 7	Division 6	Mellersta Östergötland		

* League restructuring in 2006 resulted in a new division being created at Tier 3 and subsequent divisions dropping a level.

== Attendances ==
In recent seasons BK Derby have had the following average attendances:

Season	Average attendance	Division / Section	Level
2013	118	Div 3 Nordöstra Götaland	Tier 5
2014	122	Div 3 Nordöstra Götaland	Tier 5
2015	45	Div 3 Nordöstra Götaland	Tier 5
2016	54	Div 3 Nordöstra Götaland	Tier 5
2017	55	Div 4 Östergötland Västra	Tier 6
2018	?	Div 4 Östergötland Östra	Tier 6
2019		Div 4 Östergötland Östra	Tier 6
2020		Div 4 Östergötland Östra	Tier 6

== Achievements ==
- Allsvenskan:
  - Best placement (14th): 1977
- Svenska Mästerskapet:
  - Runners-up: 1925
