= Olle Åhlund =

Swedish footballer and manager

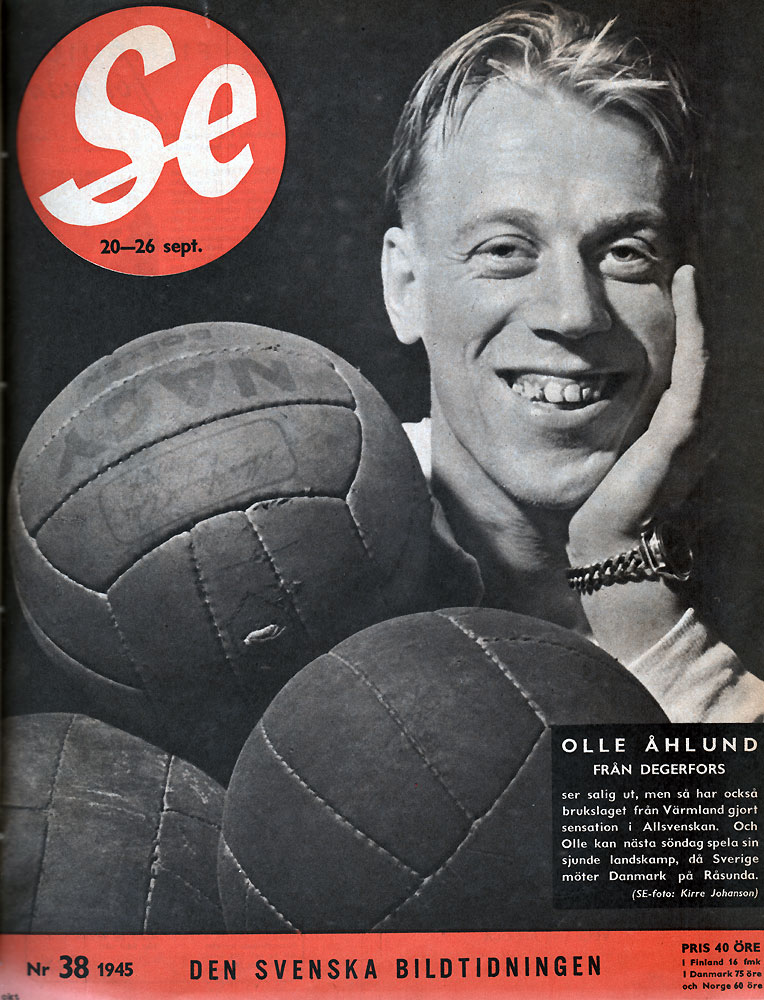
- Olle Ahlund as a magazine cover in 1945

Personal information
- Full name: Sten Olov Åhlund
- Date of birth: 22 August 1920
- Place of birth: Degerfors, Sweden
- Date of death: 11 February 1996 (aged 75)
- Place of death: Degerfors, Sweden
- Position: Midfielder

Senior career*
Years	Team	Apps	(Gls)
- Degerfors IF

International career
1943–1952	Sweden	34	(2)

Managerial career
- 1957–1959: Degerfors IF
- 1970: Degerfors IF
Medal record
Representing Sweden
FIFA World Cup
Third place	1950 Brazil
Olympic Games
Bronze medal – third place	1952 Helsinki
- * Club domestic league appearances and goals

Sten Olov “Olle” Åhlund (22 August 1920 – 11 February 1996) was a Swedish footballer, who played for Degerfors IF. He played 34 games for the Sweden national team achieving a bronze medal at the 1952 Summer Olympics.
