= Höganäs BK =

Swedish football club

- Full name: Höganäs Bollklubb
- Nickname: HBK
- Founded: 1913
- Ground: Julivallen; Höganäs; Sweden
- Chairman: Fredrik Karlsson
- Coach: Jakob Augustsson
- League: Division 4 Västra Skåne
- 2024: Division 4 Västra Skåne, 9th
Home colours	Away colours

Höganäs BK is a Swedish football club located in Höganäs in Skåne County.

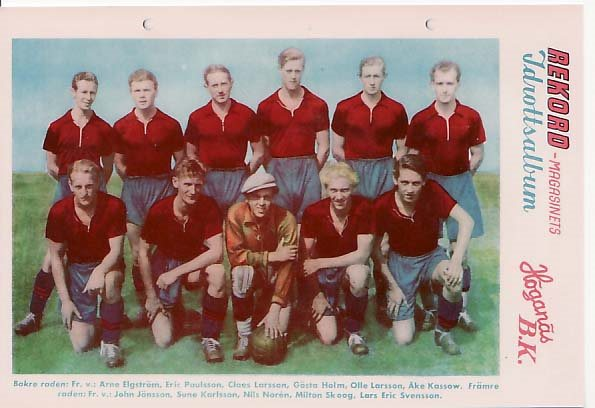
Höganäs BK in 1944 during their heyday.

== Background ==
Höganäs Bollklubb were founded in 1913 and for many years before and after the Second World War played in Division 2, which at that time was the second tier of Swedish football. In the more recent decades Höganäs BK has participated mainly in the middle and lower divisions of the Swedish football league system.

The club played between the seasons 1931/32 and 1960 for a full 28 seasons in the second highest division in football. In the 1952/53 season, they became second behind Kalmar FF who were promoted straight up to Allsvenskan.

The home ground is the Sports Center in Lerberget since 2015. At the old home ground Julivallen, the record attendance is 5.283 against Halmstad BK in the 2nd highest league division (today's Superettan) October 25, 1953.

The club currently plays in Division 2 Västra Götaland which is the fourth tier of Swedish football.

The club plays in red shirts, blue shorts and red socks.

Höganäs BK are affiliated to Skånes Fotbollförbund.

== Recent history ==
In recent seasons Höganäs BK have competed in the following divisions:

2015 – Division II, Västra Götaland
2014 – Division II, Västra Götaland
2013 – Division III, Sydvästra Götaland
2012 – Division III, Sydvästra Götaland
2011 – Division III, Sydvästra Götaland
2010 – Division III, Sydvästra Götaland
2009 – Division III, Sydvästra Götaland
2008 – Division III, Södra Götaland
2007 – Division III, Sydvästra Götaland
2006 – Division III, Sydvästra Götaland
2005 – Division IV, Skåne Västra
2004 – Division IV, Skåne Västra
2003 – Division IV, Skåne Västra
2002 – Division V, Skåne Nordvästra
2001 – Division IV, Skåne Nordvästra
2000 – Division IV, Skåne Norra
1999 – Division V, Skåne Nordvästra

== Attendances ==
In recent seasons Höganäs BK have had the following average attendances:

Season	Average attendance	Division / Section	Level
2005	Not available	Div 4 Skåne Västra	Tier 6
2006	135	Div 3 Sydvästra Götaland	Tier 5
2007	160	Div 3 Sydvästra Götaland	Tier 5
2008	109	Div 3 Södra Götaland	Tier 5
2009	161	Div 3 Sydvästra Götaland	Tier 5
2010	131	Div 3 Sydvästra Götaland	Tier 5

* Attendances are provided in the Publikliga sections of the Svenska Fotbollförbundet website.
