= 1943–44 in Swedish football =

The 1943–44 season in Swedish football, starting August 1943 and ending July 1944:

== Honours ==
=== Official titles ===
Title	Team	Reason
Swedish Champions 1943–44	Malmö FF	Winners of Allsvenskan
Swedish Cup Champions 1943	IFK Norrköping	Winners of Svenska Cupen

=== Competitions ===
Level	Competition	Team
1st level	Allsvenskan 1943–44	Malmö FF
2nd level	Division 2 Norra 1943–44	Ludvika FfI
2nd level	Division 2 Östra 1943–44	IFK Eskilstuna
2nd level	Division 2 Västra 1943–44	Billingsfors IK
2nd level	Division 2 Södra 1943–44	Landskrona BoIS
Regional Championship	Norrländska Mästerskapet 1944	Bodens BK
Cup	Svenska Cupen 1943	IFK Norrköping

== Promotions, relegations and qualifications ==
=== Promotions ===
Promoted from	Promoted to	Team	Reason
Division 2 Norra 1943–44	Allsvenskan 1944–45	Ludvika FfI	Winners of promotion play-off
Division 2 Södra 1943–44	Allsvenskan 1944–45	Landskrona BoIS	Winners of promotion play-off
Division 3 1943–44	Division 2 Norra 1944–45	Avesta AIK	Winners of promotion play-off
Division 3 1943–44	Division 2 Norra 1944–45	Surahammars IF	Winners of promotion play-off
Division 3 1943–44	Division 2 Östra 1944–45	Sundbybergs IK	Winners of promotion play-off
Division 3 1943–44	Division 2 Västra 1944–45	Karlstads BIK	Winners of promotion play-off
Division 3 1943–44	Division 2 Västra 1944–45	IFK Tidaholm	Winners of promotion play-off
Division 3 1943–44	Division 2 Södra 1944–45	Alets IK	Winners of promotion play-off
Division 3 1943–44	Division 2 Södra 1944–45	Blomstermåla IK	Winners of promotion play-off
Division 3 1943–44	Division 2 Södra 1944–45	Husqvarna IF	Winners of promotion play-off

=== League transfers ===
Transferred from	Transferred to	Team	Reason
Division 2 Norra 1943–44	Division 2 Östra 1944–45	Hammarby IF	Geographical composition

=== Relegations ===
Relegated from	Relegated to	Team	Reason
Allsvenskan 1943–44	Division 2 Norra 1944–45	IK Brage	11th team
Allsvenskan 1943–44	Division 2 Norra 1944–45	Sandvikens IF	12th team
Division 2 Norra 1943–44	Division 3 1944–45	Hagalunds IS	9th team
Division 2 Norra 1943–44	Division 3 1944–45	Örtakoloniens IF	10th team
Division 2 Östra 1943–44	Division 3 1944–45	Finspångs AIK	9th team
Division 2 Östra 1943–44	Division 3 1944–45	Västerås SK	10th team
Division 2 Västra 1943–44	Division 3 1944–45	Munkedals IF	9th team
Division 2 Västra 1943–44	Division 3 1944–45	Krokslätts FF	10th team
Division 2 Södra 1943–44	Division 3 1944–45	Olofströms IF	9th team
Division 2 Södra 1943–44	Division 3 1944–45	BK Landora	10th team

== Domestic results ==
=== Allsvenskan 1943–44 ===

	Team	Pld	W	D	L	GF		GA	GD	Pts
1	Malmö FF	22	17	3	2	54	–	22	+32	37
2	IF Elfsborg	22	15	2	5	63	–	29	+34	32
3	AIK	22	16	0	6	54	–	25	+29	32
4	IFK Norrköping	22	13	4	5	53	–	31	+22	30
5	IFK Göteborg	22	12	3	7	69	–	42	+27	27
6	Degerfors IF	22	9	7	6	42	–	31	+11	25
7	IS Halmia	22	10	1	11	47	–	56	-9	21
8	GAIS	22	5	5	12	20	–	48	-28	15
9	Halmstads BK	22	6	2	14	32	–	53	-21	14
10	Helsingborgs IF	22	1	11	10	26	–	50	-24	13
11	IK Brage	22	4	3	15	22	–	59	-37	11
12	Sandvikens IF	22	1	5	16	23	–	59	-36	7

=== Allsvenskan promotion play-off 1943–44 ===
June 4, 1944

IFK Eskilstuna	1–3	Ludvika FfI

?, Eskilstuna
June 11, 1944

Ludvika FfI	1–1	IFK Eskilstuna

?, Ludvika

May 29, 1944

Billingsfors IK	2–5	Landskrona BoIS

?, Billingsfors
June 4, 1944

Landskrona BoIS	1–0	Billingsfors IK

?, Landskrona

=== Division 2 Norra 1943–44 ===

	Team	Pld	W	D	L	GF		GA	GD	Pts
1	Ludvika FfI	18	12	3	3	46	–	27	+19	27
2	Hammarby IF	18	11	3	4	49	–	19	+30	25
3	Djurgårdens IF	18	10	3	5	50	–	23	+27	23
4	Reymersholms IK	18	9	3	6	40	–	20	+20	21
5	Ljusne AIK	18	9	1	8	50	–	38	+12	19
6	Sandvikens AIK	18	8	3	7	37	–	42	-5	19
7	Gefle IF	18	7	3	8	44	–	49	-5	17
8	Hallstahammars SK	18	5	5	8	25	–	36	-11	15
9	Hagalunds IS	18	3	6	9	27	–	52	-25	12
10	Örtakoloniens IF	18	0	2	16	17	–	79	-62	2

=== Division 2 Östra 1943–44 ===
	Team	Pld	W	D	L	GF		GA	GD	Pts
1	IFK Eskilstuna	18	12	2	4	44	–	24	+20	26
2	IK Sleipner	18	10	3	5	43	–	23	+20	23
3	Karlskoga IF	18	10	3	5	48	–	33	+15	23
4	IFK Västerås	18	10	1	7	46	–	34	+12	21
5	Örebro SK	18	9	2	7	39	–	27	+12	20
6	Åtvidabergs FF	18	9	2	7	50	–	45	+5	20
7	IF Verdandi	18	8	1	9	38	–	36	+2	17
8	Nyköpings AIK	18	4	4	10	25	–	43	-18	12
9	Finspångs AIK	18	4	3	11	27	–	48	-21	11
10	Västerås SK	18	3	1	14	19	–	66	-47	7

=== Division 2 Västra 1943–44 ===
	Team	Pld	W	D	L	GF		GA	GD	Pts
1	Billingsfors IK	18	11	3	4	52	–	29	+23	25
2	Örgryte IS	18	10	3	5	39	–	31	+8	23
3	Tidaholms GIF	18	8	4	6	43	–	34	+9	20
4	IFK Uddevalla	18	9	1	8	52	–	40	+8	19
5	Gårda BK	18	8	3	7	44	–	36	+8	19
6	IFK Trollhättan	18	6	7	5	34	–	39	-5	19
7	Lundby IF	18	5	7	6	31	–	32	-2	17
8	Skogens IF	18	6	4	8	32	–	38	-6	16
9	Munkedals IF	18	5	2	11	33	–	56	-23	12
10	Krokslätts FF	18	3	4	11	31	–	56	-25	10

=== Division 2 Södra 1943–44 ===
	Team	Pld	W	D	L	GF		GA	GD	Pts
1	Landskrona BoIS	18	14	1	3	71	–	17	+54	29
2	Jönköpings Södra IF	18	13	1	4	73	–	33	+40	27
3	Limhamns IF	18	8	5	5	35	–	32	+3	21
4	Nybro IF	18	9	1	8	44	–	37	+7	19
5	Höganäs BK	18	7	3	8	26	–	36	-10	17
6	Bromölla IF	18	6	4	8	29	–	43	-14	16
7	IFK Malmö	18	6	2	10	47	–	46	+1	14
8	Kalmar FF	18	7	0	11	30	–	44	-14	14
9	Olofströms IF	18	4	4	10	26	–	61	-35	12
10	BK Landora	18	5	1	12	24	–	56	-32	11

=== Division 2 promotion play-off 1943–44 ===
1st round

May 29, 1944

IF Vesta	0–1	Surahammars IF

?, ?
June 4, 1944

Surahammars IF	4–2	IF Vesta

?, ?

May 18, 1944

IFK Åmål	4–1	Lysekils FF

?, ?
May 21, 1944

Lysekils FF	3–2	IFK Åmål

?, ?
May 28, 1944

IFK Åmål	2–1	Lysekils FF

?, ?

2nd round

June 4, 1944

Iggesunds IK	0–2	Avesta AIK

?, ?
June 11, 1944

Avesta AIK	5–1	Iggesunds IK

?, ?

June 4, 1944

Hofors AIF	4–7	Sundbybergs IK

?, ?
June 11, 1944

Sundbybergs IK	3–2	Hofors AIF

?, ?

June 11, 1944

Surahammars IF	7–1	IK City

?, ?
June 18, 1944

IK City	1–3	Surahammars IF

?, ?

June 4, 1944

Karlstads BIK	2–2	IFK Åmål

?, ?
June 11, 1944

IFK Åmål	0–0	Karlstads BIK

?, ?
June 18, 1944

Karlstads BIK	1–0	IFK Åmål

?, ?

May 29, 1944

IFK Tidaholm	2–1	Jonsereds IF

?, ?
June 4, 1944

Jonsereds IF	1–1	IFK Tidaholm

?, ?

May 29, 1944

BK Drott	2–2	Alets IK

?, ?
June 4, 1944

Alets IK	3–2	BK Drott

?, ?

June 4, 1944

Taborsbergs SK	6–1	Husqvarna IF

?, ?
June 11, 1944

Husqvarna IF	5–0	Taborsbergs SK

?, ?
June 18, 1944

Taborsbergs SK	1–5	Husqvarna IF

?, ?

June 4, 1944

Blomstermåla IK	1–0	Lessebo GoIF

?, ?
June 11, 1944

Lessebo GoIF	3–3	Blomstermåla IK

?, ?

=== Norrländska Mästerskapet 1944 ===
Final

June 25, 1944

Sävenäs/Rönnskärs IF	0–2	Bodens BK

Norrvalla IP, Skellefteå

=== Svenska Cupen 1943 ===
Final

October 3, 1943

AIK	0–0	IFK Norrköping

Råsunda, Solna
November 14, 1943

IFK Norrköping	5–2	AIK

Idrottsparken, Norrköping

== National team results ==
September 12, 1943
Friendly
№ 240

Sweden	2–3	Hungary
Nordahl 8', 40'		Zsengellér 13'; Sárvári 48'; Leander 77' (og)

Råsunda, Solna
Attendance: 36,513
Referee: Viinioksa (Finland)

Sweden: Sven Bergquist - Harry Nilsson, Börje Leander - Olle Åhlund, Arvid Emanuelsson, Karl-Erik Grahn - Malte Mårtensson, Gunnar Gren, Gunnar Nordahl, Henry Carlsson, Arne Nyberg.

October 3, 1943
Friendly
№ 241

Finland	1–1	Sweden
Teräs 85'		Johansson 47'

Olympiastadion, Helsinki
Attendance: 10,604
Referee: Ahlfors (Finland)

Sweden: Ove Nilsson - Nils Eriksson, Erik Nilsson - Kjell Rosén, Sture Mårtensson, Sture Andersson-Dahlöf - Malte Mårtensson, Evert Grahn, Gunnar Nordahl, Knut Johansson, Stellan Nilsson.

November 7, 1943
Friendly
№ 242

Hungary	2–7	Sweden
Szusza 20', 44'		Carlsson 14'; Nyberg 42', 87'; S.Nilsson 46', 75'; Nordahl 51', 71'

Stadion Üllői Út, Budapest
Attendance: 38,000
Referee: Miesz (Austria)

Sweden: Gustav Sjöberg - Harry Nilsson, Rickard Ödéhn (30' Oskar Holmqvist) - Sture Andersson-Dahlöf, Arvid Emanuelsson, Karl-Erik Grahn - Arne Nyberg, Gunnar Gren, Gunnar Nordahl, Henry Carlsson, Stellan Nilsson.

== National team players in season 1943/44 ==
name	pos.	caps	goals	club
Olle Åhlund	MF	1	0	Degerfors IF
Sture Andersson-Dahlöf	MF/FW	2	0	IF Elfsborg
Sven "Svenne Berka" Bergquist (Bergqvist)	GK	1	0	Hammarby IF
Henry "Garvis" Carlsson	FW	2	1	AIK
Arvid "Emma" Emanuelsson	MF	2	0	IF Elfsborg
Nils Eriksson	DF	1	0	IFK Göteborg
Evert Grahn	FW	1	0	IF Elfsborg
Karl-Erik Grahn	MF	2	0	IF Elfsborg
Gunnar "Il Professore" Gren	FW	2	0	IFK Göteborg
Oskar "Masse" Holmqvist	DF	1	0	IFK Norrköping
Knut Johansson	FW	1	1	IF Elfsborg
Börje Leander	DF/MF	1	0	AIK
Malte "Svarta Blixten" Mårtensson	FW	2	0	Hälsingborgs IF
Sture Mårtensson	MF	1	0	Malmö FF
Erik Nilsson	DF	1	0	Malmö FF
Harry Nilsson	DF	2	0	AIK
Ove Nilsson	GK	1	0	Halmstads BK
Stellan Nilsson	FW	2	2	Malmö FF
Gunnar Nordahl	FW	3	4	Degerfors IF
Arne Nyberg	FW	2	2	IFK Göteborg
Rickard (Richard) Ödéhn	DF	1	0	IF Elfsborg
Kjell Rosén	MF	1	0	Malmö FF
Gustav "Gurra" Sjöberg	GK	1	0	AIK
