= 1942–43 Division 3 (Swedish football) =

Swedish League Division 3
- Season: 1942–43
- Champions: Ljusne AIK; Långshyttans AIK; Örtakoloniens IF; IFK Lidingö; Västerås SK; IFK Kumla; Arvika BK; Mustadfors IF; Munkedals IF; Motala AIF; Jönköping Södra IF; Kalmar FF; Högadals IS; IF Heimer; Krokslätts FF; Alets IK; Limhamns IF
- Promoted: 8 teams
- Relegated: 24 teams

Statistics of Swedish football Division 3 for the 1942–43 season.

== League standings ==
=== Uppsvenska Sydöstra 1942–43 ===
| Pos | Team | Pld | W | D | L | GF | GA | GD | Pts | Promotion or relegation |
|---|---|---|---|---|---|---|---|---|---|---|
| 1 | Ljusne AIK | 18 | 16 | 1 | 1 | 101 | 23 | +78 | 33 | Promotion Playoffs – Promoted |
| 2 | Iggesunds IK | 18 | 9 | 4 | 5 | 36 | 25 | +11 | 22 | |
| 3 | Strömsbruks IF | 18 | 9 | 2 | 7 | 38 | 32 | +6 | 20 | |
| 4 | Söderhamns IF | 18 | 9 | 2 | 7 | 36 | 45 | −9 | 20 | |
| 5 | IFK Bergvik | 18 | 6 | 5 | 7 | 35 | 35 | 0 | 17 | |
| 6 | Hudiksvalls IF | 18 | 7 | 2 | 9 | 34 | 37 | −3 | 16 | |
| 7 | Skärgårdens IF, Sandarne | 18 | 6 | 4 | 8 | 34 | 42 | −8 | 16 | |
| 8 | Strands IF, Hudiksvall | 18 | 6 | 2 | 10 | 26 | 47 | −21 | 14 | |
| 9 | Alfta GIF | 18 | 6 | 1 | 11 | 35 | 56 | −21 | 13 | |
| 10 | Bollnäs GIF | 18 | 4 | 1 | 13 | 25 | 51 | −26 | 9 | Relegated |

=== Uppsvenska Sydvästra 1942–43 ===
| Pos | Team | Pld | W | D | L | GF | GA | GD | Pts | Qualification or relegation |
|---|---|---|---|---|---|---|---|---|---|---|
| 1 | Långshyttans AIK | 16 | 10 | 5 | 1 | 53 | 19 | +34 | 25 | Promotion Playoffs |
| 2 | Falu BS, Falun | 16 | 8 | 3 | 5 | 37 | 28 | +9 | 19 | |
| 3 | Leksands IF | 16 | 6 | 5 | 5 | 33 | 25 | +8 | 17 | |
| 4 | Islingby IK | 16 | 6 | 5 | 5 | 42 | 40 | +2 | 17 | |
| 5 | IFK Grängesberg | 16 | 7 | 2 | 7 | 36 | 29 | +7 | 16 | |
| 6 | IFK Mora | 16 | 7 | 2 | 7 | 34 | 43 | −9 | 16 | |
| 7 | Fagersta AIK | 16 | 7 | 1 | 8 | 36 | 35 | +1 | 15 | |
| 8 | IFK Hedemora | 16 | 6 | 1 | 9 | 35 | 53 | −18 | 13 | Relegated |
| 9 | Avesta IF | 16 | 2 | 2 | 12 | 24 | 58 | −34 | 6 | Relegated |

=== Östsvenska Norra 1942–43 ===
| Pos | Team | Pld | W | D | L | GF | GA | GD | Pts | Promotion or relegation |
|---|---|---|---|---|---|---|---|---|---|---|
| 1 | Örtakoloniens IF, Sandviken | 18 | 13 | 2 | 3 | 56 | 28 | +28 | 28 | Promotion Playoffs – Promoted |
| 2 | Örbyhus IF | 18 | 9 | 6 | 3 | 58 | 39 | +19 | 24 | |
| 3 | IK Huge, Gävle | 18 | 10 | 4 | 4 | 43 | 39 | +4 | 24 | |
| 4 | Forsbacka IK | 18 | 9 | 4 | 5 | 49 | 43 | +6 | 22 | |
| 5 | Brynäs IF, Gävle | 18 | 8 | 4 | 6 | 42 | 34 | +8 | 20 | |
| 6 | Skutskärs IF | 18 | 6 | 5 | 7 | 50 | 42 | +8 | 17 | |
| 7 | IFK Gefle, Gävle | 18 | 6 | 5 | 7 | 31 | 27 | +4 | 17 | |
| 8 | Söderfors GIF | 18 | 6 | 3 | 9 | 43 | 42 | +1 | 15 | |
| 9 | Hedesunda IF | 18 | 5 | 1 | 12 | 37 | 59 | −22 | 11 | Relegated |
| 10 | Norrsundets IF | 18 | 0 | 2 | 16 | 15 | 71 | −56 | 2 | Relegated |

=== Östsvenska Södra 1942–43 ===
| Pos | Team | Pld | W | D | L | GF | GA | GD | Pts | Qualification or relegation |
|---|---|---|---|---|---|---|---|---|---|---|
| 1 | IFK Lidingö | 18 | 12 | 2 | 4 | 52 | 28 | +24 | 26 | Promotion Playoffs |
| 2 | Värtans IK, Stockholm | 18 | 11 | 4 | 3 | 46 | 28 | +18 | 26 | |
| 3 | Årsta SK, Stockholm | 18 | 10 | 5 | 3 | 50 | 29 | +21 | 25 | |
| 4 | Nynäshamns IF | 18 | 9 | 5 | 4 | 52 | 37 | +15 | 23 | |
| 5 | Enskede IK | 18 | 6 | 5 | 7 | 35 | 29 | +6 | 17 | |
| 6 | Vasalunds IF, Solna | 18 | 6 | 4 | 8 | 41 | 51 | −10 | 16 | |
| 7 | IK Tellus, Stockholm | 18 | 6 | 3 | 9 | 37 | 32 | +5 | 15 | |
| 8 | IF Olympia, Stockholm | 18 | 6 | 3 | 9 | 31 | 42 | −11 | 15 | |
| 9 | Södertälje SK | 18 | 6 | 2 | 10 | 37 | 48 | −11 | 14 | Relegated |
| 10 | Stockholms IF | 18 | 0 | 3 | 15 | 14 | 71 | −57 | 3 | Relegated |

=== Centralserien Norra 1942–43 ===
| Pos | Team | Pld | W | D | L | GF | GA | GD | Pts | Promotion or relegation |
|---|---|---|---|---|---|---|---|---|---|---|
| 1 | Västerås SK | 18 | 13 | 1 | 4 | 63 | 22 | +41 | 27 | Promotion Playoffs – Promoted |
| 2 | IF Vesta, Uppsala | 18 | 10 | 4 | 4 | 42 | 28 | +14 | 24 | |
| 3 | IF Norden, Sala | 18 | 9 | 3 | 6 | 40 | 32 | +8 | 21 | |
| 4 | IFK Arboga | 18 | 10 | 0 | 8 | 49 | 37 | +12 | 20 | |
| 5 | Västerås IK | 18 | 7 | 5 | 6 | 42 | 30 | +12 | 19 | |
| 6 | Kolsva IF | 18 | 7 | 3 | 8 | 29 | 30 | −1 | 17 | |
| 7 | Heby AIF | 18 | 7 | 3 | 8 | 32 | 54 | −22 | 17 | |
| 8 | Enköpings SK | 18 | 7 | 2 | 9 | 26 | 42 | −16 | 16 | |
| 9 | Morgongåva SK | 18 | 5 | 0 | 13 | 27 | 46 | −19 | 10 | |
| 10 | Köpings IS | 18 | 4 | 1 | 13 | 20 | 49 | −29 | 9 | |

=== Centralserien Södra 1942–43 ===
| Pos | Team | Pld | W | D | L | GF | GA | GD | Pts | Qualification or relegation |
|---|---|---|---|---|---|---|---|---|---|---|
| 1 | IFK Kumla | 18 | 12 | 3 | 3 | 52 | 25 | +27 | 27 | Promotion Playoffs |
| 2 | IF Rune, Kungsör | 18 | 9 | 5 | 4 | 46 | 33 | +13 | 23 | |
| 3 | IK City, Eskilstuna | 18 | 9 | 5 | 4 | 39 | 28 | +11 | 23 | |
| 4 | BK Forward, Örebro | 18 | 10 | 3 | 5 | 41 | 39 | +2 | 23 | |
| 5 | IFK Nora | 18 | 7 | 4 | 7 | 39 | 33 | +6 | 18 | |
| 6 | Örebro IK | 18 | 7 | 1 | 10 | 37 | 34 | +3 | 15 | |
| 7 | Östermalms IS, Eskilstuna | 18 | 6 | 3 | 9 | 35 | 37 | −2 | 15 | |
| 8 | IFK Hallsberg | 18 | 5 | 5 | 8 | 37 | 51 | −14 | 15 | |
| 9 | Tunafors SK, Eskilstuna | 18 | 3 | 7 | 8 | 23 | 44 | −21 | 13 | |
| 10 | IK Standard, Hållsta | 18 | 3 | 2 | 13 | 20 | 45 | −25 | 8 | Relegated |

=== Nordvästra Norra 1942–43 ===
| Pos | Team | Pld | W | D | L | GF | GA | GD | Pts | Qualification or relegation |
|---|---|---|---|---|---|---|---|---|---|---|
| 1 | Arvika BK | 18 | 10 | 5 | 3 | 54 | 32 | +22 | 25 | Promotion Playoffs |
| 2 | IK Viking, Hagfors | 18 | 11 | 2 | 5 | 54 | 30 | +24 | 24 | |
| 3 | Karlstads BIK | 18 | 11 | 2 | 5 | 47 | 31 | +16 | 24 | |
| 4 | Skoghalls IF | 18 | 9 | 2 | 7 | 44 | 44 | 0 | 20 | |
| 5 | IFK Sunne | 18 | 7 | 4 | 7 | 57 | 55 | +2 | 18 | |
| 6 | Hällefors AIF | 18 | 7 | 3 | 8 | 53 | 55 | −2 | 17 | |
| 7 | IF Örnen, Kristinehamn | 18 | 7 | 1 | 10 | 46 | 51 | −5 | 15 | |
| 8 | IFK Bofors | 18 | 6 | 3 | 9 | 45 | 57 | −12 | 15 | |
| 9 | Forshaga IF | 18 | 6 | 2 | 10 | 35 | 44 | −9 | 14 | Relegated |
| 10 | Storfors FF | 18 | 4 | 0 | 14 | 26 | 62 | −36 | 8 | Relegated |

=== Nordvästra Södra, Dalsland 1942–43 ===
| Pos | Team | Pld | W | D | L | GF | GA | GD | Pts | Qualification or relegation |
|---|---|---|---|---|---|---|---|---|---|---|
| 1 | Mustadfors IF | 14 | 12 | 2 | 0 | 57 | 18 | +39 | 26 | Promotion Playoffs |
| 2 | IFK Åmål | 14 | 12 | 0 | 2 | 64 | 18 | +46 | 24 | |
| 3 | Långeds IF | 14 | 7 | 1 | 6 | 29 | 37 | −8 | 15 | |
| 4 | Fengersfors IK | 14 | 5 | 3 | 6 | 35 | 37 | −2 | 13 | |
| 5 | IF Viken, Åmål | 14 | 5 | 1 | 8 | 36 | 44 | −8 | 11 | |
| 6 | Bengtsfors IF | 14 | 4 | 2 | 8 | 23 | 54 | −31 | 10 | |
| 7 | Stigens IF | 14 | 2 | 5 | 7 | 21 | 34 | −13 | 9 | |
| 8 | Ödeborgs IF | 14 | 1 | 2 | 11 | 25 | 48 | −23 | 4 | Relegated |

=== Nordvästra Södra, Bohus 1942–43 ===
| Pos | Team | Pld | W | D | L | GF | GA | GD | Pts | Promotion or relegation |
|---|---|---|---|---|---|---|---|---|---|---|
| 1 | Munkedals IF | 14 | 12 | 2 | 0 | 58 | 18 | +40 | 26 | Promotion Playoffs – Promoted |
| 2 | IK Kongahälla, Kungälv | 14 | 9 | 3 | 2 | 36 | 19 | +17 | 21 | |
| 3 | Hunnebostrands GIF | 14 | 7 | 2 | 5 | 32 | 44 | −12 | 16 | |
| 4 | Fjällbacka IK | 14 | 7 | 0 | 7 | 48 | 38 | +10 | 14 | |
| 5 | Lysekils FF | 14 | 6 | 1 | 7 | 50 | 37 | +13 | 13 | |
| 6 | Uddevalla IS | 14 | 4 | 0 | 10 | 29 | 42 | −13 | 8 | |
| 7 | IK Svane | 14 | 3 | 1 | 10 | 27 | 50 | −23 | 7 | |
| 8 | Kungshamns IF | 14 | 3 | 1 | 10 | 21 | 53 | −32 | 7 | Relegated |

=== Mellansvenska Norra 1942–43 ===
| Pos | Team | Pld | W | D | L | GF | GA | GD | Pts | Qualification or relegation |
|---|---|---|---|---|---|---|---|---|---|---|
| 1 | Motala AIF | 18 | 13 | 2 | 3 | 51 | 17 | +34 | 28 | Promotion Playoffs |
| 2 | Taborsbergs SK | 18 | 10 | 2 | 6 | 61 | 37 | +24 | 22 | |
| 3 | Loddby IF | 18 | 9 | 4 | 5 | 52 | 28 | +24 | 22 | |
| 4 | Katrineholms SK | 18 | 10 | 2 | 6 | 49 | 42 | +7 | 22 | |
| 5 | Skärblacka IF | 18 | 8 | 3 | 7 | 53 | 43 | +10 | 19 | |
| 6 | BK Derby, Linköping | 18 | 7 | 4 | 7 | 48 | 39 | +9 | 18 | |
| 7 | Karle IF | 18 | 7 | 3 | 8 | 50 | 61 | −11 | 17 | |
| 8 | BK Zeros, Motala | 18 | 7 | 1 | 10 | 45 | 69 | −24 | 15 | |
| 9 | Mjölby AIF | 18 | 5 | 2 | 11 | 27 | 48 | −21 | 12 | Relegated |
| 10 | Boxholms IF | 18 | 2 | 1 | 15 | 29 | 81 | −52 | 5 | Relegated |

=== Mellansvenska Södra 1942–43 ===
| Pos | Team | Pld | W | D | L | GF | GA | GD | Pts | Promotion or relegation |
|---|---|---|---|---|---|---|---|---|---|---|
| 1 | Jönköping Södra IF | 18 | 14 | 2 | 2 | 69 | 22 | +47 | 30 | Promotion Playoffs – Promoted |
| 2 | Husqvarna IF | 18 | 11 | 2 | 5 | 59 | 36 | +23 | 24 | |
| 3 | IFK Värnamo | 18 | 11 | 0 | 7 | 44 | 31 | +13 | 22 | |
| 4 | Huskvarna Södra IS | 18 | 6 | 6 | 6 | 40 | 34 | +6 | 18 | |
| 5 | IK Tord, Jönköping | 18 | 8 | 1 | 9 | 39 | 43 | −4 | 17 | |
| 6 | Nässjö IF | 18 | 6 | 5 | 7 | 27 | 36 | −9 | 17 | |
| 7 | Ljungby IF | 18 | 6 | 3 | 9 | 31 | 53 | −22 | 15 | |
| 8 | Gislaveds IS | 18 | 5 | 4 | 9 | 35 | 52 | −17 | 14 | |
| 9 | IF Hallby, Jönköping | 18 | 5 | 3 | 10 | 24 | 37 | −13 | 13 | Relegated |
| 10 | Anderstorps IF | 18 | 4 | 2 | 12 | 27 | 51 | −24 | 10 | Relegated |

=== Sydöstra Norra 1942–43 ===
| Pos | Team | Pld | W | D | L | GF | GA | GD | Pts | Promotion or relegation |
|---|---|---|---|---|---|---|---|---|---|---|
| 1 | Kalmar FF | 18 | 14 | 3 | 1 | 94 | 23 | +71 | 31 | Promotion Playoffs – Promoted |
| 2 | IFK Oskarshamn | 18 | 12 | 4 | 2 | 57 | 36 | +21 | 28 | |
| 3 | Västerviks AIS | 18 | 10 | 1 | 7 | 48 | 30 | +18 | 21 | |
| 4 | Kalmar AIK | 18 | 9 | 2 | 7 | 64 | 46 | +18 | 20 | |
| 5 | Hvetlanda GIF, Vetlanda | 18 | 8 | 3 | 7 | 37 | 49 | −12 | 19 | |
| 6 | IF Hebe, Silverdalen | 18 | 7 | 3 | 8 | 60 | 64 | −4 | 17 | |
| 7 | Klavreströms IF | 18 | 7 | 2 | 9 | 40 | 59 | −19 | 16 | |
| 8 | Målilla GIF | 18 | 6 | 3 | 9 | 37 | 51 | −14 | 15 | |
| 9 | Blomstermåla IK | 18 | 4 | 4 | 10 | 28 | 45 | −17 | 12 | |
| 10 | Rosenfors IK | 18 | 0 | 1 | 17 | 21 | 83 | −62 | 1 | Relegated |

=== Sydöstra Södra 1942–43 ===
| Pos | Team | Pld | W | D | L | GF | GA | GD | Pts | Qualification or relegation |
|---|---|---|---|---|---|---|---|---|---|---|
| 1 | Högadals IS | 18 | 15 | 1 | 2 | 86 | 25 | +61 | 31 | Promotion Playoffs |
| 2 | Hovmantorps GIF | 18 | 11 | 2 | 5 | 62 | 32 | +30 | 24 | |
| 3 | Karlskrona BK | 18 | 11 | 1 | 6 | 53 | 40 | +13 | 23 | |
| 4 | IFK Karlshamn | 18 | 10 | 1 | 7 | 52 | 40 | +12 | 21 | |
| 5 | Sölvesborgs GIF | 18 | 7 | 4 | 7 | 38 | 39 | −1 | 18 | |
| 6 | Mjällby AIF | 18 | 6 | 4 | 8 | 21 | 37 | −16 | 16 | |
| 7 | Kallinge SK | 18 | 7 | 1 | 10 | 43 | 55 | −12 | 15 | |
| 8 | Ronneby BK | 18 | 7 | 0 | 11 | 30 | 61 | −31 | 14 | |
| 9 | IFK Karlskrona | 18 | 3 | 3 | 12 | 31 | 51 | −20 | 9 | Relegated |
| 10 | IFK Ronneby | 18 | 3 | 3 | 12 | 27 | 63 | −36 | 9 | Relegated |

=== Västsvenska Norra 1942–43 ===
| Pos | Team | Pld | W | D | L | GF | GA | GD | Pts | Qualification or relegation |
|---|---|---|---|---|---|---|---|---|---|---|
| 1 | IF Heimer, Lidköping | 18 | 10 | 4 | 4 | 42 | 28 | +14 | 24 | Promotion Playoffs |
| 2 | Trollhättans IF | 18 | 9 | 4 | 5 | 43 | 25 | +18 | 22 | |
| 3 | Kinna IF | 18 | 9 | 4 | 5 | 40 | 33 | +7 | 22 | |
| 4 | Alingsås IF | 18 | 9 | 3 | 6 | 51 | 36 | +15 | 21 | |
| 5 | Skene IF | 18 | 8 | 2 | 8 | 31 | 43 | −12 | 18 | |
| 6 | Vänersborgs IF | 18 | 6 | 5 | 7 | 35 | 36 | −1 | 17 | |
| 7 | Skövde AIK | 18 | 8 | 1 | 9 | 48 | 50 | −2 | 17 | |
| 8 | Norrbygärde IF | 18 | 6 | 4 | 8 | 34 | 36 | −2 | 16 | |
| 9 | Skara IF | 18 | 5 | 2 | 11 | 35 | 43 | −8 | 12 | |
| 10 | Svaneholms IF | 18 | 5 | 1 | 12 | 29 | 58 | −29 | 11 | Relegated |

=== Västsvenska Södra 1942–43 ===
| Pos | Team | Pld | W | D | L | GF | GA | GD | Pts | Promotion or relegation |
|---|---|---|---|---|---|---|---|---|---|---|
| 1 | Krokslätts FF, Mölndal | 18 | 11 | 3 | 4 | 56 | 23 | +33 | 25 | Promotion Playoffs – Promoted |
| 2 | Jonsereds IF | 18 | 12 | 1 | 5 | 52 | 20 | +32 | 25 | |
| 3 | Lindholmens BK, Göteborg | 18 | 10 | 4 | 4 | 40 | 33 | +7 | 24 | |
| 4 | Majornas IK, Göteborg | 18 | 11 | 1 | 6 | 51 | 32 | +19 | 23 | |
| 5 | Hisingstads IS, Hisingen | 18 | 9 | 3 | 6 | 36 | 23 | +13 | 21 | |
| 6 | IK Virgo, Göteborg | 18 | 9 | 1 | 8 | 35 | 26 | +9 | 19 | |
| 7 | Göteborgs FF | 18 | 5 | 5 | 8 | 24 | 39 | −15 | 15 | |
| 8 | IF Warta, Göteborg | 18 | 4 | 5 | 9 | 23 | 46 | −23 | 13 | |
| 9 | Partille IF | 18 | 4 | 2 | 12 | 18 | 37 | −19 | 10 | |
| 10 | Haga IF, Göteborg | 18 | 1 | 3 | 14 | 8 | 64 | −56 | 5 | Relegated |

=== Sydsvenska Norra 1942–43 ===
| Pos | Team | Pld | W | D | L | GF | GA | GD | Pts | Qualification or relegation |
|---|---|---|---|---|---|---|---|---|---|---|
| 1 | Alets IK | 14 | 9 | 3 | 2 | 60 | 18 | +42 | 21 | Promotion Playoffs |
| 2 | IFK Kungsbacka | 14 | 8 | 2 | 4 | 50 | 35 | +15 | 18 | |
| 3 | Falkenbergs FF | 14 | 6 | 4 | 4 | 39 | 28 | +11 | 16 | |
| 4 | Oskarströms IS | 14 | 6 | 4 | 4 | 31 | 39 | −8 | 16 | |
| 5 | IS Örnia, Halmstad | 14 | 5 | 4 | 5 | 28 | 39 | −11 | 14 | |
| 6 | Varbergs GIF | 14 | 4 | 3 | 7 | 38 | 40 | −2 | 11 | |
| 7 | IF Leikin, Halmstad | 14 | 3 | 3 | 8 | 26 | 40 | −14 | 9 | |
| 8 | Tvååkers IF | 14 | 2 | 3 | 9 | 23 | 56 | −33 | 7 | Relegated |

=== Sydsvenska Södra 1942–43 ===
| Pos | Team | Pld | W | D | L | GF | GA | GD | Pts | Promotion or relegation |
|---|---|---|---|---|---|---|---|---|---|---|
| 1 | Limhamns IF | 18 | 12 | 2 | 4 | 53 | 23 | +30 | 26 | Promotion Playoffs – Promoted |
| 2 | Eskilsminne IF, Hälsingborg | 18 | 11 | 4 | 3 | 49 | 32 | +17 | 26 | |
| 3 | IFK Höganäs | 18 | 9 | 4 | 5 | 46 | 32 | +14 | 22 | |
| 4 | Klippans BoIF | 18 | 9 | 3 | 6 | 34 | 24 | +10 | 21 | |
| 5 | IFK Kristianstad | 18 | 8 | 3 | 7 | 57 | 42 | +15 | 19 | |
| 6 | Sofielunds IF, Malmö | 18 | 6 | 4 | 8 | 40 | 44 | −4 | 16 | |
| 7 | Malmö BI | 18 | 6 | 4 | 8 | 27 | 34 | −7 | 16 | |
| 8 | Bjuvs IF | 18 | 5 | 3 | 10 | 33 | 35 | −2 | 13 | |
| 9 | Malmö SK | 18 | 5 | 2 | 11 | 32 | 69 | −37 | 12 | Relegated |
| 10 | IFK Hässleholm | 18 | 3 | 3 | 12 | 20 | 56 | −36 | 9 | Relegated |
