= 1942–43 in Swedish football =

The 1942–43 season in Swedish football, starting August 1942 and ending July 1943:

== Honours ==
=== Official titles ===
Title	Team	Reason
1942–43 Swedish Champions	IFK Norrköping	Winners of Allsvenskan
1942 Swedish Cup Champions	GAIS	Winners of Svenska Cupen

=== Competitions ===
Level	Competition	Team
1st level	Allsvenskan 1942–43	IFK Norrköping
2nd level	Division 2 Norra 1942–43	IK Brage
2nd level	Division 2 Östra 1942–43	Finspångs AIK
2nd level	Division 2 Västra 1942–43	Örgryte IS
2nd level	Division 2 Södra 1942–43	IS Halmia
Regional Championship	Norrländska Mästerskapet 1943	IF Friska Viljor
Cup	Svenska Cupen 1942	GAIS

== Promotions, relegations and qualifications ==
=== Promotions ===
Promoted from	Promoted to	Team	Reason
Division 2 Norra 1942–43	Allsvenskan 1943–44	IK Brage	Winners of promotion play-off
Division 2 Södra 1942–43	Allsvenskan 1943–44	IS Halmia	Winners of promotion play-off
Division 3 1942–43	Division 2 Norra 1943–44	Ljusne AIK	Winners of promotion play-off
Division 3 1942–43	Division 2 Norra 1943–44	Örtakoloniens IF	Winners of promotion play-off
Division 3 1942–43	Division 2 Östra 1943–44	Västerås SK	Winners of promotion play-off
Division 3 1942–43	Division 2 Västra 1943–44	Krokslätts FF	Winners of promotion play-off
Division 3 1942–43	Division 2 Västra 1943–44	Munkedals IF	Winners of promotion play-off
Division 3 1942–43	Division 2 Södra 1943–44	Jönköpings Södra IF	Winners of promotion play-off
Division 3 1942–43	Division 2 Södra 1943–44	Kalmar FF	Winners of promotion play-off
Division 3 1942–43	Division 2 Södra 1943–44	Limhamns IF	Winners of promotion play-off

=== League transfers ===
Transferred from	Transferred to	Team	Reason
Division 2 Östra 1942–43	Division 2 Norra 1943–44	Hallstahammars SK	Geographical composition
Division 2 Västra 1942–43	Division 2 Östra 1943–44	Karlskoga IF	Geographical composition

=== Relegations ===
Relegated from	Relegated to	Team	Reason
Allsvenskan 1942–43	Division 2 Västra 1943–44	Gårda BK	11th team
Allsvenskan 1942–43	Division 2 Östra 1943–44	IFK Eskilstuna	12th team
Division 2 Norra 1942–43	Division 3 1943–44	Hofors AIF	9th team
Division 2 Norra 1942–43	Division 3 1943–44	Sundbybergs IK	10th team
Division 2 Östra 1942–43	Division 3 1943–44	Surahammars IF	9th team
Division 2 Östra 1942–43	Division 3 1943–44	Avesta AIK	10th team
Division 2 Västra 1942–43	Division 3 1943–44	Deje IK	9th team
Division 2 Västra 1942–43	Division 3 1943–44	Waggeryds IK	10th team
Division 2 Södra 1942–43	Division 3 1943–44	IFK Trelleborg	9th team
Division 2 Södra 1942–43	Division 3 1943–44	Varbergs BoIS	10th team

== Domestic results ==
=== Allsvenskan 1942–43 ===

	Team	Pld	W	D	L	GF		GA	GD	Pts
1	IFK Norrköping	22	12	7	3	52	–	25	+27	31
2	IF Elfsborg	22	14	2	6	58	–	32	+26	30
3	Helsingborgs IF	22	12	6	4	46	–	28	+18	30
4	Degerfors IF	22	9	8	5	49	–	27	+22	26
5	Malmö FF	22	10	5	7	44	–	30	+14	25
6	Halmstads BK	22	9	7	6	38	–	50	-12	25
7	AIK	22	10	4	8	48	–	37	+11	24
8	IFK Göteborg	22	7	10	5	46	–	40	+6	24
9	Sandvikens IF	22	8	2	12	31	–	47	-16	18
10	GAIS	22	6	3	13	38	–	47	-9	15
11	Gårda BK	22	2	5	15	17	–	60	-43	9
12	IFK Eskilstuna	22	2	3	17	31	–	75	-44	7

=== Allsvenskan promotion play-off 1942–43 ===
June 3, 1943

IK Brage	1–0	Finspångs AIK

?, Borlänge
June 6, 1943

Finspångs AIK	2–0	IK Brage

?, Finspång
June 11, 1943

IK Brage	9–0	Finspångs AIK

?, Solna

June 3, 1943

IS Halmia	3–0	Örgryte IS

?, Halmstad
June 9, 1943

Örgryte IS	2–2	IS Halmia

?, Gothenburg

=== Division 2 Norra 1942–43 ===

	Team	Pld	W	D	L	GF		GA	GD	Pts
1	IK Brage	18	12	4	2	42	–	19	+23	28
2	Sandvikens AIK	18	11	2	5	47	–	32	+15	24
3	Ludvika FfI	18	10	3	5	47	–	40	+7	23
4	Hammarby IF	18	8	3	7	58	–	37	+21	19
5	Reymersholms IK	18	9	1	8	37	–	29	+8	19
6	Djurgårdens IF	18	8	1	9	46	–	38	+8	17
7	Hagalunds IS	18	6	5	7	34	–	48	-14	17
8	Gefle IF	18	6	4	8	37	–	47	-10	16
9	Hofors AIF	18	5	4	9	33	–	45	-12	14
10	Sundbybergs IK	18	0	3	15	14	–	60	-46	3

=== Division 2 Östra 1942–43 ===
	Team	Pld	W	D	L	GF		GA	GD	Pts
1	Finspångs AIK	18	8	7	3	44	–	29	+15	23
2	Åtvidabergs FF	18	8	6	4	46	–	29	+17	22
3	Nyköpings AIK	18	10	1	7	42	–	47	-5	21
4	Örebro SK	18	7	6	5	32	–	24	+8	20
5	Hallstahammars SK	18	6	6	6	25	–	30	-5	18
6	IF Verdandi	18	6	5	7	28	–	32	-4	17
7	IK Sleipner	18	7	3	8	28	–	32	-4	17
8	IFK Västerås	18	5	6	7	28	–	32	-4	16
9	Surahammars IF	18	3	8	7	24	–	24	0	14
10	Avesta AIK	18	4	4	10	27	–	45	-18	12

=== Division 2 Västra 1942–43 ===
	Team	Pld	W	D	L	GF		GA	GD	Pts
1	Örgryte IS	18	10	5	3	42	–	29	+13	25
2	Karlskoga IF	18	10	4	4	51	–	27	+24	24
3	IFK Trollhättan	18	10	3	5	37	–	23	+14	23
4	Billingsfors IK	18	10	2	6	36	–	30	+6	22
5	Skogens IF	18	9	0	9	50	–	44	+6	18
6	IFK Uddevalla	18	8	2	8	45	–	47	-2	18
7	Tidaholms GIF	18	8	2	8	38	–	41	-3	18
8	Lundby IF	18	7	2	9	37	–	41	-4	16
9	Deje IK	18	4	4	10	28	–	40	-12	12
10	Waggeryds IK	18	1	2	15	25	–	67	-42	4

=== Division 2 Södra 1942–43 ===
	Team	Pld	W	D	L	GF		GA	GD	Pts
1	IS Halmia	18	12	4	2	40	–	16	+24	28
2	Landskrona BoIS	18	11	2	5	52	–	22	+30	24
3	Nybro IF	18	9	6	3	44	–	29	+15	24
4	IFK Malmö	18	8	3	7	33	–	41	-8	19
5	Bromölla IF	18	5	8	5	27	–	25	+2	18
6	Höganäs BK	18	5	6	7	28	–	38	-10	16
7	Olofströms IF	18	6	3	9	29	–	36	-7	15
8	BK Landora	18	4	4	10	29	–	42	-13	12
9	IFK Trelleborg	18	4	4	10	18	–	34	-16	12
10	Varbergs BoIS	18	4	4	10	15	–	32	-17	12

=== Division 2 promotion play-off 1942–43 ===
1st round

May 23, 1943

Munkedals IF	3–1	Mustadfors IF

?, ?
May 30, 1943

Mustadfors IF	2–3	Munkedals IF

?, ?

2nd round

June 3, 1943

Långshyttans AIK	2–1	Ljusne AIK

?, ?
June 6, 1943

Ljusne AIK	3–0	Långshyttans AIK

?, ?
June 14, 1943

Långshyttans AIK	0–3	Ljusne AIK

?, ?

June 3, 1943

IFK Lidingö	2–5	Örtakoloniens IF

?, ?
June 6, 1943

Örtakoloniens IF	0–0	IFK Lidingö

?, ?

June 3, 1943

IFK Kumla	1–1	Västerås SK

?, ?
June 6, 1943

Västerås SK	3–1	IFK Kumla

?, ?

June 3, 1943

Munkedals IF	3–0	Arvika BK

?, ?
June 6, 1943

Arvika BK	1–1	Munkedals IF

?, ?

June 3, 1943

Krokslätts FF	3–1	IF Heimer

?, ?
June 6, 1943

IF Heimer	1–1	Krokslätts FF

?, ?

June 3, 1943

Limhamns IF	2–1	Alets IK

?, ?
June 6, 1943

Alets IK	1–1	Limhamns IF

?, ?

June 3, 1943

Motala AIF	4–1	Jönköpings Södra IF

?, ?
June 6, 1943

Jönköpings Södra IF	3–1	Motala AIF

?, ?
June 14, 1943

Motala AIF	?–? 1–3 (aet)	Jönköpings Södra IF

?, ?

June 3, 1943

Högadals IS	3–2	Kalmar FF

?, ?
June 6, 1943

Kalmar FF	5–3	Högadals IS

?, ?
June 14, 1943

Högadals IS	0–1	Kalmar FF

?, ?

=== Norrländska Mästerskapet 1943 ===
Final

July 25, 1943

IFK Holmsund	1–4	IF Friska Viljor

Kamratvallen, Holmsund

=== Svenska Cupen 1942 ===
Final

October 18, 1942

GAIS	2–1	IF Elfsborg

Råsunda, Solna

== National team results ==
September 20, 1942
Friendly
№ 235

Germany	2–3	Sweden
Lehner 14'; Klingler 43'		Nyberg 7'; Carlsson 44'; Mårtensson 63'

Olympiastadion, Berlin
Attendance: 90,000
Referee: Laursen (Denmark)

Sweden: Sven Bergquist - Harry Nilsson, Börje Leander - Erik Persson, Arvid Emanuelsson, Karl-Erik Grahn - Malte Mårtensson, Gunnar Gren, Gunnar Nordahl, Henry Carlsson, Arne Nyberg ( Erik Holmqvist).

October 4, 1942
Friendly
№ 236

Sweden	2–1	Denmark
Gren 27'; Nordahl 63'		Sørensen 82' (p)

Råsunda, Solna
Attendance: 36,638
Referee: Viinioksa (Finland)

Sweden: Sven Bergquist - Harry Nilsson, Börje Leander - Erik Persson, Arvid Emanuelsson, Karl-Erik Grahn - Malte Mårtensson, Gunnar Gren, Gunnar Nordahl, Henry Carlsson, Erik Holmqvist.

November 15, 1942
Friendly
№ 237

Switzerland	3–1	Sweden
Friedländer 14'; Bickel 70' (p); Amadò 72'		Leander 68' (p)

Hardturm, Zürich
Attendance: 38,000
Referee: Bauwens (Germany)

Sweden: Sven Bergquist - Harry Nilsson, Börje Leander - Erik Persson, Arvid Emanuelsson, Karl-Erik Grahn - Malte Mårtensson (85' Knut Johansson), Gunnar Gren, Gunnar Nordahl, Henry Carlsson, Erik Holmqvist.

June 14, 1943
Friendly
№ 238

Sweden	1–0	Switzerland
Sandberg 14'

Råsunda, Solna
Attendance: 32,636
Referee: Laursen (Denmark)

Sweden: Sven Bergquist - Börje Leander, Rickard Ödéhn - Olle Åhlund, Arvid Emanuelsson, Karl-Erik Grahn - Malte Mårtensson, Gunnar Gren, Gunnar Nordahl, Henry Carlsson, Carl-Erik Sandberg.

June 20, 1943
Friendly
№ 239

Denmark	3–2	Sweden
Christiansen 9', 46'; Pløger 68'		Gren 42'; Nordahl 60'

Idrætsparken, Copenhagen
Attendance: 36,000
Referee: Alho (Finland)

Sweden: Sven Bergquist - Börje Leander, Rickard Ödéhn - Olle Åhlund, Arvid Emanuelsson, Karl-Erik Grahn - Malte Mårtensson, Gunnar Gren, Gunnar Nordahl, Erik Holmqvist, Carl-Erik Sandberg.

== National team players in season 1942/43 ==
name	pos.	caps	goals	club
Olle Åhlund	MF	2	0	Degerfors IF
Sven "Svenne Berka" Bergquist (Bergqvist)	GK	5	0	Hammarby IF
Henry "Garvis" Carlsson	FW	4	1	AIK
Arvid "Emma" Emanuelsson	MF	5	0	IF Elfsborg
Karl-Erik Grahn	MF	5	0	IF Elfsborg
Gunnar "Il Professore" Gren	FW	5	2	IFK Göteborg
Erik "Mulle" Holmqvist	FW	4	0	IFK Norrköping
Knut Johansson	FW	1	0	IF Elfsborg
Börje Leander	DF/MF	5	1	AIK
Malte "Svarta Blixten" Mårtensson	FW	5	1	Hälsingborgs IF
Harry Nilsson	DF	3	0	AIK
Gunnar Nordahl	FW	5	2	Degerfors IF
Arne Nyberg	FW	1	1	IFK Göteborg
Rickard (Richard) Ödéhn	DF	2	0	IF Elfsborg
Erik Persson	MF	3	0	Landskrona BoIS
Carl-Erik "Pigge" Sandberg	FW	2	1	Malmö FF
