= Björn Carlsson (footballer, born 1942) =

Swedish footballer

Personal information
- Full name: Björn Henry Carlsson
- Date of birth: 7 June 1942 (age 84)
- Place of birth: Solna, Sweden
- Position: Forward

Youth career
- 1954–1959: AIK

Senior career*
Years	Team	Apps	(Gls)
1960–1968	AIK	162	(53)
1969–1974	IK Sirius		
1974–1976	IFK Falköping		

International career
1961–1964	Sweden U21	7	(2)
1965–1966	Sweden B	2	(0)
1963–1966	Sweden	5	(0)
- * Club domestic league appearances and goals

Björn Henry Carlsson (born 7 June 1942) is a Swedish former footballer who played as a forward. He represented AIK, IK Sirius, and IFK Falköping during a career that spanned between 1960 and 1976. A full international between 1963 and 1966, he won five caps for the Sweden national team.

He is the son of former international footballer Henry "Garvis" Carlsson.

== Early life ==
Carlsson was born in Solna, but moved to Madrid with his family in 1949 when his father Henry "Garvis" Carlsson signed a professional contract with La Liga club Atlético Madrid. He was an early student at the Scandinavian School in Madrid and spent his spare time playing football on the streets of Madrid. In 1953, Carlsson and his family returned to Solna and he joined AIK's youth academy the following year.

== Club career ==
Carlsson made his senior debut for AIK on 11 May 1960 in an Allsvenskan game against Djurgårdens IF, playing the full 90 minutes in a 1–2 loss at only 17 years of age. He went on to play 162 league games and score 53 goals for AIK, of which 140 games and 44 goals were in Allsvenskan. Carlsson also played 58 Allsvenskan games for IK Sirius between 1969 and 1974, before retiring at IFK Falköping in 1976.

== International career ==
Carlsson made his full international debut for the Sweden national team on 14 August 1963, in a friendly 0–0 draw with Finland. His fifth and final cap came on 27 June 1966 in a friendly game against Yugoslavia, when he replaced Agne Simonsson at halftime in a 1–1 draw. He also represented the Sweden U21 and B teams during his career.

== Career statistics ==
=== International ===
Appearances and goals by national team and year
National team	Year	Apps	Goals
Sweden	1963	1	0
Sweden	1964	0	0
Sweden	1965	2	0
Sweden	1966	2	0
Total		5	0

== Honours ==
AIK

- Division 2 Svealand: 1962
