= Dick Last =

Swedish former footballer (born 1969)

Personal information
- Full name: Dick Peter Last
- Date of birth: 3 February 1969 (age 57)
- Place of birth: Munkedal, Sweden
- Height: 1.82 m (6 ft 0 in)
- Position: Goalkeeper

Youth career
- Munkedals IF

Senior career*
Years	Team	Apps	(Gls)
1986	IK Oddevold	2	(0)
1987–1988	IFK Göteborg	0	(0)
1989–1990	IK Oddevold	52	(0)
1991–1995	IFK Göteborg	11	(0)
1996–1997	IFK Norrköping	49	(0)
1998–1999	IFK Göteborg	17	(0)
1999–2000	Vejle BK	6	(0)
2000–2008	Örgryte IS	198	(0)
2011	IK Oddevold	0	(0)
Total		335	(0)

International career
1984–1985	Sweden U17	1	(0)
2002	Sweden	1	(0)
- * Club domestic league appearances and goals

Dick Peter Last (born 3 February 1969) is a Swedish former footballer who played as a goalkeeper. Last most notably represented IK Oddevold, IFK Göteborg, IFK Norrköping, and Örgryte IS and was named the Swedish Goalkeeper of the Year in 1996.

He won one cap for the Sweden national team.

== Club career ==
Last started his career at Munkedals IF before joining IK Oddevold in 1986. In 1987, he left for big club IFK Göteborg and two years later returned to Uddevalla and IK Oddevold. In 1991, after gaining some first team experience, he again left IK Oddevold for IFK Göteborg.

After five years as backup for legendary Swedish goalkeeper Thomas Ravelli at IFK Göteborg, Last left for Allsvenskan rivals IFK Norrköping in 1996. That year he was awarded the "Swedish goalkeeper of the year award", beating Ravelli who had won the award the previous year.

When Thomas Ravelli in 1998 left IFK Göteborg to play for Major League Soccer team Tampa Bay Mutiny, Dick Last again joined IFK Göteborg.

Once again finding himself being the "second" choice at IFK Göteborg, in 1999 Last left for Danish club Vejle BK. In 2000, he came back to Gothenburg and Allsvenskan when he signed for Örgryte IS.

Last ended his playing career in 2008 at Örgryte IS to become sports director at the same club. In the fall of 2010 Last had to leave due to the club's financial difficulties.

=== Comeback ===
In 2011, at the age of 42, Dick Last announced his comeback to football. He signed for Division 1 Södra club IK Oddevold, who he also played for in the late 80's, as a backup goalkeeper.

== International career ==
In October 2002, Dick made his debut for the Sweden national team, coming on as substitute in a friendly game against Portugal at Ullevi. This was his first and only cap for Sweden.

== Honours ==
- Swedish Goalkeeper of the Year: 1996

== Club statistics ==
Club performance			League		Cup		League Cup		Continental		Total	
Season	Club	League	Apps	Goals	Apps	Goals	Apps	Goals	Apps	Goals	Apps	Goals
Sweden			League		Svenska Cupen		League Cup		Europe		Total	
1986	IK Oddevold	Division 3 NV Götaland	2	0			-	-	-	-		
1987	IFK Göteborg	Allsvenskan	0	0			-	-	0	0		
1988	IFK Göteborg	Allsvenskan	0	0			-	-	0	0		
1989	IK Oddevold	Division 1 Södra	26	0			-	-	-	-		
1990	IK Oddevold	Division 1 Södra	26	0			-	-	-	-		
1991	IFK Göteborg	Allsvenskan	0	0			-	-	0	0		
1992	IFK Göteborg	Allsvenskan	4	0			-	-	2	0		
1993	IFK Göteborg	Allsvenskan	0	0			-	-	-	-		
1994	IFK Göteborg	Allsvenskan	1	0			-	-	0	0		
1995	IFK Göteborg	Allsvenskan	6	0			-	-	1	0		
1996	IFK Norrköping	Allsvenskan	23	0			-	-	-	-		
1997	IFK Norrköping	Allsvenskan	26	0			-	-	-	-		
1998	IFK Göteborg	Allsvenskan	13	0			-	-	0	0		
1999	IFK Göteborg	Allsvenskan	4	0			-	-	0	0		
Denmark			League		Danish Cup		League Cup		Europe		Total	
1999–2000	Vejle BK	Superliga	6	0					-	-		
Sweden			League		Svenska Cupen		League Cup		Europe		Total	
2000	Örgryte IS	Allsvenskan	14	0			-	-	4	0		
2001	Örgryte IS	Allsvenskan	24	0	3	0	-	-	-	-	27	0
2002	Örgryte IS	Allsvenskan	25	0	2	0	-	-	-	-	27	0
2003	Örgryte IS	Allsvenskan	19	0	2	0	-	-	1	0	22	0
2004	Örgryte IS	Allsvenskan	24	0	3	0	-	-	-	-	27	0
2005	Örgryte IS	Allsvenskan	25	0	0	0	-	-	-	-	25	0
2006	Örgryte IS	Allsvenskan	23	0	0	0	-	-	-	-	23	0
2007	Örgryte IS	Superettan	27	0	0	0	-	-	-	-	27	0
2008	Örgryte IS	Superettan	17	0	0	0	-	-	-	-	17	0
2011	IK Oddevold	Division 1 Södra	0	0	0	0	-	-	-	-	0	0
Total	Sweden		329	0			-	-	-	-		
Total	Allsvenskan		231	0	-	-	-	-	-	-	231	0
Total	Superettan		44	0	-	-	-	-	-	-	44	0
Total	Division 1		52	0	-	-	-	-	-	-	52	0
Total	Division 3		2	0	-	-	-	-	-	-	2	0
Total	Denmark		6	0					-	-		
Career total			335	0					5	0		
