= Magnus Kihlstedt =

Swedish footballer

Personal information
- Full name: Tommy Magnus Kihlstedt
- Date of birth: 29 February 1972 (age 54)
- Place of birth: Munkedal, Sweden
- Height: 1.90 m (6 ft 3 in)
- Position: Goalkeeper

Youth career
- Munkedals IF

Senior career*
| Years | Team | Apps | (Gls) |
| 1988 | Munkedals IF | | |
| 1989–1996 | IK Oddevold | 131 | (0) |
| 1997–1998 | Lillestrøm SK | 52 | (0) |
| 1999–2001 | Brann | 51 | (0) |
| 2001–2005 | Copenhagen | 69 | (0) |

International career
| 1998–2004 | Sweden | 13 | (0) |
- * Club domestic league appearances and goals

Tommy Magnus Kihlstedt (born 29 February 1972) is a Swedish former professional footballer who played as a goalkeeper. He played professionally in Sweden, Norway, and Denmark, winning Danish Superliga titles with FC Copenhagen. He won 13 caps for the Sweden national team between 1998 and 2004, and was a squad player at UEFA Euro 2000, the 2002 FIFA World Cup, and UEFA Euro 2004.

== Career statistics ==
=== Club ===
Appearances and goals by club, season and competition
| Club | Season | League | | | Cup | | Continental | | Total | |
| Club | Season | Division | Apps | Goals | Apps | Goals | Apps | Goals | Apps | Goals |
|---|---|---|---|---|---|---|---|---|---|---|
| Munkedal | 1988 | | | | | | – | | | |
| Oddevold | 1989 | Division 1 Södra | 0 | 0 | | | – | | 0 | 0 |
| Oddevold | 1990 | Division 1 Södra | 0 | 0 | | | – | | 0 | 0 |
| Oddevold | 1991 | Division 1 Västra | 2 | 0 | | | – | | 2 | 0 |
| Oddevold | 1992 | Division 1 Västra | 28 | 0 | | | – | | 28 | 0 |
| Oddevold | 1993 | Division 1 Södra | 26 | 0 | | | – | | 26 | 0 |
| Oddevold | 1994 | Division 1 Södra | 25 | 0 | | | – | | 25 | 0 |
| Oddevold | 1995 | Division 1 Södra | 25 | 0 | | | – | | 25 | 0 |
| Oddevold | 1996 | Allsvenskan | 25 | 0 | | | – | | 25 | 0 |
| Oddevold | Total | | 131 | 0 | | | – | | 131 | 0 |
| Lillestrøm | 1997 | Tippeligaen | 26 | 0 | 4 | 0 | 4 (Note: Appearances in the UEFA Cup) | 0 | 34 | 0 |
| Lillestrøm | 1998 | Tippeligaen | 26 | 0 | 1 | 0 | – | | 27 | 0 |
| Lillestrøm | Total | | 52 | 0 | 5 | 0 | 4 | 0 | 61 | 0 |
| Brann | 1999 | Tippeligaen | 24 | 0 | 6 | 0 | 1 | 0 | 31 | 0 |
| Brann | 2000 | Tippeligaen | 22 | 0 | 2 | 0 | 4 | 0 | 28 | 0 |
| Brann | 2001 | Tippeligaen | 5 | 0 | 1 | 0 | 0 | 0 | 6 | 0 |
| Brann | Total | | 51 | 0 | 8 | 0 | 5 | 0 | 64 | 0 |
| Copenhagen | 2001–02 | Superligaen | 32 | 0 | 2 | 0 | 9 (Note: Three appearances in the UEFA Champions League qualifying rounds; six appearances in the UEFA Cup.) | 0 | 43 | 0 |
| Copenhagen | 2002–03 | Superligaen | 3 | 0 | 0 | 0 | 0 | 0 | 3 | 0 |
| Copenhagen | 2003–04 | Superligaen | 23 | 0 | 2 | 0 | 2 | 0 | 27 | 0 |
| Copenhagen | 2004–05 | Superligaen | 11 | 0 | 1 | 0 | 3 (Note: One appearance in the UEFA Champions League qualifying round; two appearances in the Scandinavian Royal League.) | 0 | 14 | 0 |
| Copenhagen | Total | | 69 | 0 | 5 | 0 | 14 | 0 | 88 | 0 |
| Career total | | | 303 | 0 | 18 | 0 | 23 | 0 | 344 | 0 |

=== International ===
Appearances and goals by national team and year
| National team | Year | Apps | Goals |
|---|---|---|---|
| Sweden | 1998 | 1 | 0 |
| Sweden | 1999 | 3 | 0 |
| Sweden | 2000 | 2 | 0 |
| Sweden | 2001 | 4 | 0 |
| Sweden | 2002 | 2 | 0 |
| Sweden | 2003 | 0 | 0 |
| Sweden | 2004 | 1 | 0 |
| Total | | 13 | 0 |

== Honours ==
Oddevold

- Division 1 Södra: 1995

Copenhagen

- Royal League: 2004–05
- Superligaen: 2002–03, 2003–04
- DBU Pokalen: 2003–04
- Danish Super Cup: 2004
