= Ove Nilsson =

Swedish footballer (1918–2010)

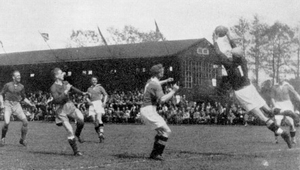
- Ove Nilsson Halmstads BK intervenes in an Allsvenskan match against Hälsingborgs IF at Örjans vall in Halmstad.

Personal information
- Full name: Per Ove Lennart Nilsson
- Date of birth: 17 August 1918
- Place of birth: Välluv, Sweden
- Date of death: 17 January 2010 (aged 91)
- Position: Goalkeeper

Senior career*
| Years | Team | Apps | (Gls) |
- Forsby IF
- Rönne IF
| –1940 | Laholms IF | | |
| 1940–1944 | Halmstads BK | 43 | (0) |
| 1944–1946 | Örgryte IS | | |
| 1946–1953 | Djurgårdens IF | 111 | (0) |
| 1954–1956 | Spånga IS | | |

International career
| 1943–1951 | Sweden | 3 | (0) |
| 1947 | Sweden B | 1 | (0) |

Managerial career
- Spånga IS (playing manager)
- * Club domestic league appearances and goals

Per Ove Lennart Nilsson (17 August 1918 in Välluv, Sweden — 17 January 2010) is a Swedish former football goalkeeper. He made 109 Allsvenskan appearances for Djurgårdens IF.
