= Henry Carlsson =

Swedish footballer and manager

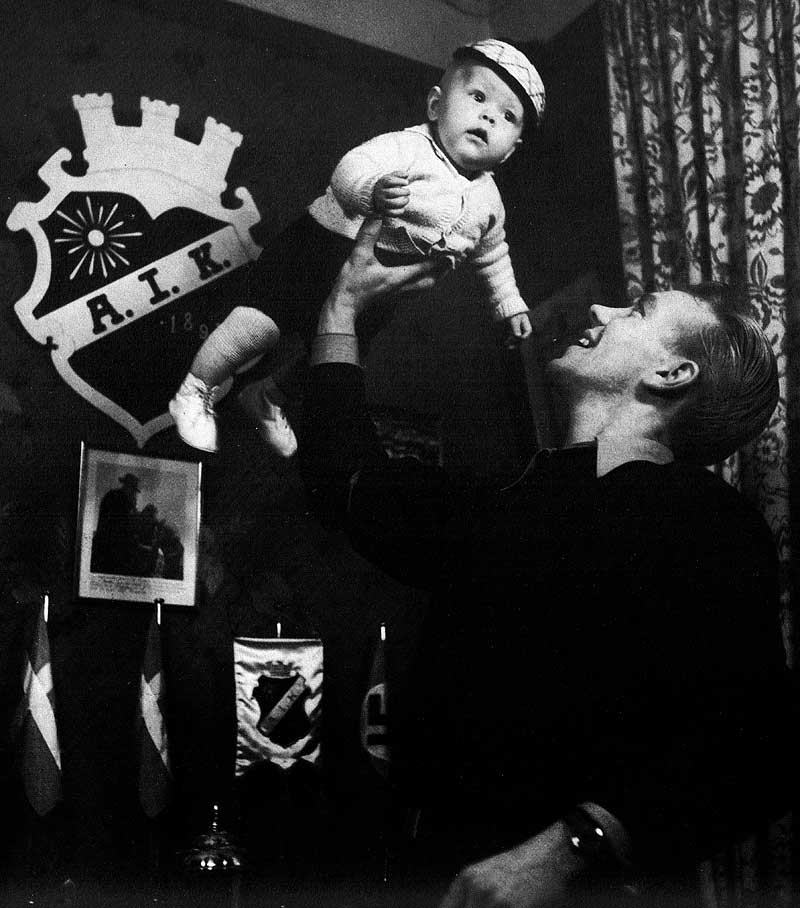
- Henry Carlsson and his son Björn (c. 1945)

Personal information
- Full name: Nils Gustav Henry Carlsson
- Date of birth: 29 October 1917
- Place of birth: Falköping, Sweden
- Date of death: 28 May 1999 (aged 81)
- Place of death: Solna, Sweden
- Height: 1.63 m (5 ft 4 in)
- Position: Center forward

Youth career
- IK Göta (Falköping)
- 1930–1939: Falköping GIS

Senior career*
Years	Team	Apps	(Gls)
1939–1948	AIK	181	(93)
1948–1949	Stade Français	7	(7)
1949	AIK	11	(4)
1949–1953	Atlético Madrid	87	(31)
Total		286	(135)

International career
1941–1949	Sweden	26	(17)

Managerial career
- 1956–1958: AIK
- 1958–1964: Sundbybergs IK
- 1965–1966: AIK
- 1969–1971: IF Brommapojkarna
- * Club domestic league appearances and goals

Olympic medal record

Representing Sweden

Men's football
Gold medal – first place	1948 London	Team competition

Nils Gustav Henry "Garvis" Carlsson (29 October 1917 – 28 May 1999), was a Swedish professional footballer who played as a forward. He represented AIK, Stade Français, and Atletico Madrid during a club career that spanned between 1939 and 1953. A full international between 1941 and 1949, he won 26 caps for the Sweden national team and was part of the Sweden Olympic team that won the gold medal at the 1948 Summer Olympics.

== Personal life ==
He was the father of Björn Carlsson, who also represented AIK in Allsvenskan and played for the Sweden national team.

== Career statistics ==
=== International ===
Appearances and goals by national team and year
National team	Year	Apps	Goals
Sweden	1941	3	4
Sweden	1942	4	2
Sweden	1943	3	1
Sweden	1944	0	0
Sweden	1945	4	4
Sweden	1946	1	0
Sweden	1947	0	0
Sweden	1948	9	5
Sweden	1949	2	1
Total		26	17

Scores and results list Sweden's goal tally first, score column indicates score after each Carlsson goal.

List of international goals scored by Henry Carlsson
No.	Date	Venue	Opponent	Score	Result	Competition	Ref.
1	14 September 1941	Råsunda, Stockholm, Sweden	Denmark	1–2	2–2	Friendly	
2	5 October 1941	Råsunda, Stockholm, Sweden	Germany	1–0	4–2	Friendly	
3	5 October 1941	Råsunda, Stockholm, Sweden	Germany	3–1	4–2	Friendly	
4	5 October 1941	Råsunda, Stockholm, Sweden	Germany	4–1	4–2	Friendly	
5	28 June 1942	Parken, Copenhagen, Denmark	Denmark	3–0	3–0	Friendly	
6	20 September 1942	Berlin Olympic Stadium, Berlin, Germany	Germany	2–2	3–2	Friendly	
7	7 November 1943	Üllöi utca, Budapest, Hungary	Hungary	1–0	7–2	Friendly	
8	26 August 1945	Gamla Ullevi, Gothenburg, Sweden	Finland	4–2	7–2	Friendly	
9	30 September 1945	Råsunda, Stockholm, Sweden	Denmark	2–1	4–1	Friendly	
10	21 October 1945	Råsunda, Stockholm, Sweden	Norway	4–0	10–0	Friendly	
11	21 October 1945	Råsunda, Stockholm, Sweden	Norway	6–0	10–0	Friendly	
12	5 August 1948	Selhurst Park, London, England	South Korea	5–0	12–0	1948 Summer Olympics	
13	5 August 1948	Selhurst Park, London, England	South Korea	7–0	12–0	1948 Summer Olympics	
14	5 August 1948	Selhurst Park, London, England	South Korea	11–0	12–0	1948 Summer Olympics	
15	10 August 1948	Wembley Stadium, London, England	Denmark	1–1	4–2	1948 Summer Olympics	
16	10 August 1948	Wembley Stadium, London, England	Denmark	4–1	4–2	1948 Summer Olympics	
17	13 May 1949	Råsunda, Stockholm, Sweden	England	1–0	3–1	Friendly	

== Honours ==
Atletico Madrid

- La Liga: 1949–50, 1950–51
- Copa Eva Duarte: 1951 (Predecessor to the Supercopa de España)

Sweden

- Summer Olympics: 1948

Individual

- Stor Grabb: 1943

== Sources ==
- Barreaud, Marc (1998). Dictionnaire des footballeurs étrangers du championnat professionnel français (1932–1997). L'Harmattan, Paris. ISBN 2-7384-6608-7.
- Profile at AIK
- Henry Carlsson at BDFutbol
- Henry Carlsson at IMDb
