= Munkedals IF =

Swedish football club

- Full name: Munkedals Idrottsförening
- Founded: 1908
- Ground: Munkedals IP; Munkedal; Sweden
- Chairman: Royne Dahlqvist
- Head coach: Albin Sheqiri
- League: Division 5 Bohuslän/Dal
- 2010: Division 4 Bohuslän Norra, 2nd
Home colours	Away colours

Munkedals IF is a Swedish football club located in Munkedal in Västra Götaland County.

== Background ==
Munkedals Idrottsförening were formed in 1908. Two famous players that have represented the club are the goalkeepers Dick Last and Magnus Kihlstedt.

Since their foundation Munkedals IF has participated mainly in the middle and lower divisions of the Swedish football league system. The club currently plays in Division 5 Bohuslän/Dal which is the seventh tier of Swedish football. They play their home matches at the Munkedals IP in Munkedal.

Munkedals IF are affiliated to the Bohusläns Fotbollförbund.

== Season to season ==
In their early history Munkedals IF competed in the following divisions:

Season	Level	Division	Section	Position	Movements
1932–33	Tier 3	Division 3	Västsvenska	7th	
1933–34	Tier 3	Division 3	Västsvenska	6th	
1934–35	Tier 3	Division 3	Västsvenska Norra	7th	
1935–36	Tier 3	Division 3	Västsvenska Norra	6th	
1936–37	Tier 3	Division 3	Västsvenska Norra	7th	
1937–38	Tier 3	Division 3	Västsvenska Norra	6th	
1938–39	Tier 3	Division 3	Västsvenska Norra	7th	
1939–40	Tier 3	Division 3	Västsvenska Norra	9th	
1940–41	Tier 3	Division 3	Västsvenska Södra	3rd	
1941–42	Tier 3	Division 3	Västsvenska Södra, Bohus	2nd	
1942–43	Tier 3	Division 3	Västsvenska Södra, Bohus	1st	Promotion Playoffs – Promoted
1943–44	Tier 2	Division 2	Västra	9th	Relegated
1944–45	Tier 3	Division 3	Västsvenska Södra, Bohus	1st	Promotion Playoffs
1945–46	Tier 3	Division 3	Västsvenska Södra, Bohus	4th	
1946–47	Tier 3	Division 3	Västsvenska Södra	8th	Relegated

In recent seasons Munkedals IF have competed in the following divisions:

Season	Level	Division	Section	Position	Movements
1999	Tier 6	Division 5	Bohuslän/Dal	12th	Relegated
2000	Tier 7	Division 6	Bohuslän/Dal Norra	3rd	
2001	Tier 7	Division 6	Bohuslän/Dal Norra	4th	
2002	Tier 7	Division 6	Bohuslän/Dal Norra	2nd	Promoted
2003	Tier 6	Division 5	Bohuslän/Dal	4th	
2004	Tier 6	Division 5	Bohuslän/Dal	8th	
2005	Tier 6	Division 5	Bohuslän/Dal	7th	
2006*	Tier 7	Division 5	Bohuslän/Dal	9th	
2007	Tier 7	Division 5	Bohuslän/Dal	10th	
2008	Tier 7	Division 5	Bohuslän/Dal	12th	Relegated
2009	Tier 8	Division 6	Bohuslän Centrala/Södra	2nd	
	Tier 8	Division 6	Bohuslän Centrala/Södra A-slutspel	6th	
2010	Tier 8	Division 6	Bohuslän Norra	1st	Promoted
2011	Tier 7	Division 5	Bohuslän/Dal		

* League restructuring in 2006 resulted in a new division being created at Tier 3 and subsequent divisions dropping a level.

== Attendances ==
In recent seasons Munkedals IF have had the following average attendances:

Season	Average attendance	Division / Section	Level
2009	Not available	Div 6 Bohuslän Centrala/Södra	Tier 8
2010	60	Div 6 Bohuslän Norra	Tier 8

* Attendances are provided in the Publikliga sections of the Svenska Fotbollförbundet website.
