= Alets IK =

Association football club

- Full name: Alets Idrottsklubb
- Founded: 1923
- Ground: Alevallen; Halmstad; Sweden
- Chairman: Per Hallström
- Head coach: Håkan Hallberg
- Coach: Christer Jönsson
- League: Division 4 Halland
- 2019: Division 5 Halland, 1st (Promoted)
Home colours

Alets IK is a Swedish football club located in Halmstad. The club is currently in Division 5.

== Background ==
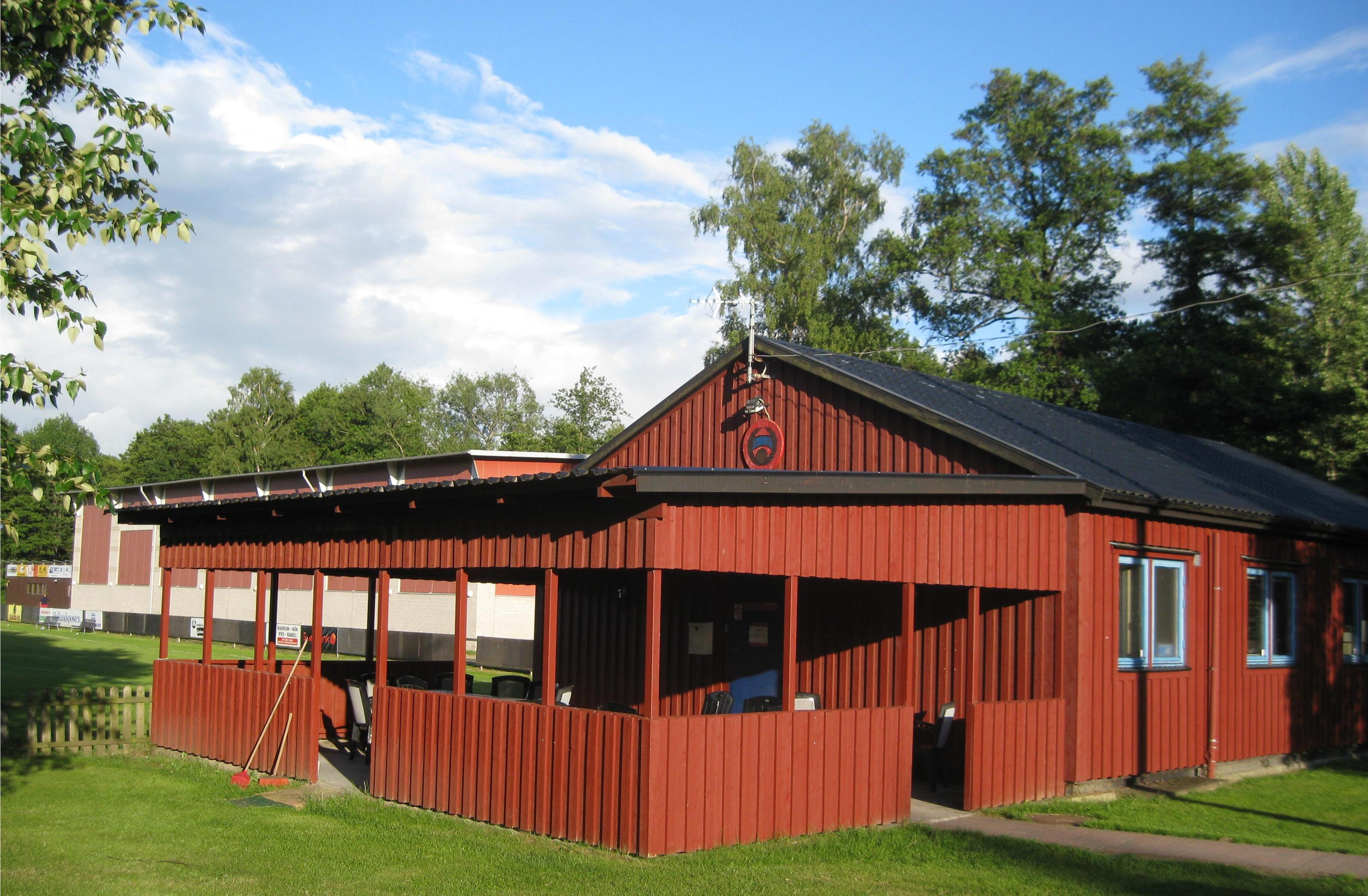
Alets IK's clubhouse at Alevallen

The club was established in 1923 as the Västra Boll and Idrottsföreningen, the Western Ball and Sports Club. The club was renamed Alets Idrottsklubb shortly afterwards. Alets IK was founded by Göte Streiffert, the first chairman.

Their first match was played on 21 June 1925. The team played against teams IF Gota and Furulands FF. Alets IK was greatly affected by World War II when the team struggled to find players Despite this, Alets IK was able to settle in Division 3 in 1939–40. One of the team's best seasons was 1942–43 when they finished in first place in Division 3 Sydsvenska Norra. The team was eligible for the Division 2 promotion playoffs. Next season Alets IK went one better winning their league and the promotion playoffs to advance to Division 2.

In the 1950s the team toured Germany. However, the team struggled on the pitch and were relegated. The 1960s proved to be more prosperous for the team, especially the B team. In 1968, the junior team won their league. During the 1970s, the club went through a series of different managers, a different one every year.

By the 1980s, there was a steady manager named Tommy Södergren. In 1981, the girls team were the series champions. In 1982 Eva Andersson was selected for the women's national team. In 1983 Claes "Lillis" Karlsson and Gunnar Bringman left Halmstad BK and returned to Alets after nine seasons.

By 1985 the men's team was relegated to Division 5 but the next year the team won their division. In 1986 the team advanced to Division 4 but were relegated once again to Division 5. Throughout the 1990s, the club remained in Division 4 and recruited Lillis Karlsson and Ingvar Andersson to be managers.

In 2000, the team won Division 5 Halland Södra but were relegated the following season. In 2002, the team won Division 5 again but were relegated the following year. In 2004, the team were relegated to Division 6. However, in 2005, they won Division 6 and were promoted back to Division 5. By 2009, the team were playing in Elitfyran with Niklas Andersson and Thomas Jonsson as co-managers. The B-team played in Class 2 South and placed 6th in Division 5 South.

Alets IK currently plays in Division 4 Halland which is the sixth tier of Swedish football. They play their home matches at the Alevallen in Halmstad.

The club are affiliated to the Hallands Fotbollförbund. Alets IK have competed in the Svenska Cupen on 9 occasions and have played 14 matches in the competition.

== Season to season ==
In their early history Alets IK competed in the following divisions:

Season	Level	Division	Section	Position	Movements
1939–40	Tier 3	Division 3	Sydsvenska	6th	
1940–41	Tier 3	Division 3	Sydsvenska Norra	7th	
1941–42	Tier 3	Division 3	Sydsvenska Norra	4th	
1942–43	Tier 3	Division 3	Sydsvenska Norra	1st	Promotion Playoffs
1943–44	Tier 3	Division 3	Sydsvenska Norra	1st	Promotion Playoffs – Promoted
1944–45	Tier 2	Division 2	Södra	8th	
1945–46	Tier 2	Division 2	Södra	7th	
1946–47	Tier 2	Division 2	Södra	10th	Relegated (2 levels)
1947–48	Tier 4	Division 4			
1948–49	Tier 4	Division 4			Promoted (2 levels)
1949–50	Tier 2	Division 2	Södra	2nd	
1950–51	Tier 2	Division 2	Södra	6th	
1951–52	Tier 2	Division 2	Södra	10th	Relegated

* League restructuring in 2006 resulted in a new division being created at Tier 3 and subsequent divisions dropping a level.

In recent seasons Alets IK have competed in the following divisions:

Season	Level	Division	Section	Position	Movements
1999	Tier 5	Division 4	Halland	12th	Relegated
2000	Tier 6	Division 5	Halland Södra	1st	Promoted
2001	Tier 5	Division 4	Halland	10th	Relegated
2002	Tier 6	Division 5	Halland Södra	1st	Promoted
2003	Tier 5	Division 4	Halland	12th	Relegated
2004	Tier 6	Division 5	Halland Södra	11th	Relegated
2005	Tier 7	Division 6	Halland Södra	1st	Promoted
2006*	Tier 7	Division 5	Halland Södra	1st	Promoted
2007	Tier 6	Division 4	Halland	9th	Relegation Playoffs – Relegated
2008	Tier 6	Division 4	Halland	3rd	Promoted
2009	Tier 6	Division 4	Halland Elit	5th	
2010	Tier 6	Division 4	Halland Elit	6th	
2011	Tier 6	Division 4	Halland Elit	3rd	
2012	Tier 6	Division 4	Halland Elit	12th	Relegated
2013	Tier 6	Division 4	Halland	12th	Relegated
2014	Tier 7	Division 5	Halland Södra	6th	
2015	Tier 7	Division 5	Halland Södra	3rd	
2016	Tier 7	Division 6	Halland Södra	4th	
2017	Tier 7	Division 6	Halland Södra	1st	Promoted
2018	Tier 7	Division 5	Halland	4th	
2019	Tier 7	Division 5	Halland	1st	Promoted
2020	Tier 6	Division 4	Halland		

* League restructuring in 2006 resulted in a new division being created at Tier 3 and subsequent divisions dropping a level.

== Attendances ==
In recent seasons Alets IK have had the following average attendances:

Season	Average attendance	Division / Section	Level
2008	Not available	Div 4 Halland	Tier 6
2009	40	Div 4 Halland Elit	Tier 6
2010	102	Div 4 Halland Elit	Tier 6
2011	37	Div 4 Halland Elit	Tier 6
2012	Not Available	Div 4 Halland Elit	Tier 6
2013	Not Available	Div 4 Halland	Tier 6
2014	Not Available	Div 5 Halland Södra	Tier 7
2015	Not Available	Div 5 Halland Södra	Tier 7
2016	19	Div 6 Halland Södra	Tier 7
2017	Not Available	Div 6 Halland Södra	Tier 7
2018	?	Div 5 Halland	Tier 7
2019	?	Div 5 Halland	Tier 7
2020		Div 4 Halland	Tier 6

* Attendances are provided in the Publikliga sections of the Svenska Fotbollförbundet website.
